= List of high schools in Oklahoma =

This is a list of high schools in the state of Oklahoma, USA.

== Adair County ==
- Cave Springs High School, Bunch
- Stilwell High School, Stillwell
- Watts High School, Watts
- Westville High School, Westville

== Alfalfa County ==
- Aline-Cleo High School, Aline
- Burlington High School, Burlington
- Cherokee High School, Cherokee
- Timberlake High School, Helena

== Atoka County ==
- Atoka High School, Atoka
- Caney High School, Caney
- Stringtown High School, Stringtown
- Tushka High School, Atoka

== Beaver County ==
- Balko School, Balko
- Beaver High School, Beaver
- Forgan High School, Forgan
- Turpin High School, Turpin

== Beckham County ==
- Erick High School, Erick
- Sayre High School, Sayre

=== Elk City ===
- Elk City High School
- Merritt High School

== Blaine County ==
- Canton High School, Canton
- Geary High School, Geary
- Okeene Junior-Senior High School, Okeene
- Watonga High School, Watonga

== Bryan County ==
- Achille High School, Achille
- Bennington High School, Bennington
- Caddo High School, Caddo
- Calera High School, Calera
- Colbert High School, Colbert
- Rock Creek High School, Bokchito

=== Durant ===
- Durant High School
- Silo High School

== Caddo County ==
- Anadarko High School, Anadarko
- Apache High School, Apache
- Binger-Oney High School, Binger
- Carnegie High School, Carnegie
- Cement High School, Cement
- Cyril High School, Cyril
- Fort Cobb-Broxton High School, Fort Cobb
- Gracemont High School, Gracemont
- Hinton High School, Hinton
- Hydro-Eakly High School, Hydro
- Lookeba-Sickles High School, Lookeba

== Canadian County ==
- Calumet High School, Calumet
- El Reno High School, El Reno
- Mustang High School, Mustang
- Piedmont High School, Piedmont
- Union City High School, Union City

=== Yukon ===
- Southwest Covenant School
- Yukon High School

== Carter County ==
- Fox Junior-Senior High School, Fox
- Healdton High School, Healdton
- Lone Grove High School, Lone Grove
- Springer High School, Springer
- Wilson High School, Wilson

=== Ardmore ===
- Ardmore High School
- Dickson High School
- Plainview High School

== Cherokee County ==
- Hulbert Junior-Senior High School, Hulbert
- Keys High School, Park Hill

=== Tahlequah ===
- Sequoyah High School
- Tahlequah High School

== Choctaw County ==
- Boswell High School, Boswell
- Fort Towson High School, Fort Towson
- Hugo High School, Hugo
- Soper High School, Soper

== Cimarron County ==
- Boise City High School, Boise City
- Felt High School, Felt

== Cleveland County ==
- Lexington High School, Lexington
- Noble High School, Noble

=== Norman ===
- Little Axe High School
- Norman High School
- Norman North High School

=== Oklahoma City ===
- Moore High School
- Westmoore High School
- Southmoore High School

== Coal County ==
- Coalgate High School, Coalgate
- Tupelo High School, Tupelo

== Comanche County ==
- Cache High School, Cache
- Chattanooga High School, Chattanooga
- Elgin High School, Elgin
- Fletcher High School, Fletcher
- Geronimo High School, Geronimo
- Indiahoma High School, Indiahoma
- Sterling High School, Sterling

=== Lawton ===
- Eisenhower High School
- Lawton High School
- MacArthur High School

== Cotton County ==
- Big Pasture High School, Randlett
- Temple High School, Temple
- Walters High School, Walters

== Craig County ==
- Bluejacket High School, Bluejacket
- Ketchum High School, Ketchum
- Welch Junior-Senior High School, Welch

=== Vinita ===
- Vinita High School
- White Oak High School

== Creek County ==
- Bristow High School, Bristow
- Depew High School, Depew
- Kellyville High School, Kellyville
- Kiefer High School, Kiefer
- Mannford High School, Mannford
- Mounds High School, Mounds
- Oilton High School, Oilton
- Sapulpa High School, Sapulpa

=== Drumright ===
- Drumright High School
- Olive High School

== Custer County ==
- Arapaho High School, Arapaho
- Butler High School, Butler
- Clinton High School, Clinton
- Thomas-Fay-Custer Unified High School, Thomas
- Weatherford High School, Weatherford

== Delaware County ==
- Colcord High School, Colcord
- Grove High School, Grove
- Jay High School, Jay
- Kansas High School, Kansas
- Oaks-Mission High School, Oaks

== Dewey County ==
- Seiling Junior-Senior High School, Seiling
- Taloga High School, Taloga
- Vici High School, Vici
- Leedey High School, Leedey

== Ellis County ==
- Arnett High School, Arnett
- Fargo-Gage High School, Fargo
- Shattuck Senior High School, Shattuck

== Garfield County ==
- Cimarron High School, Lahoma
- Covington-Douglas High School, Covington
- Drummond High School, Drummond
- Garber High School, Garber
- Kremlin-Hillsdale High School, Kremlin

=== Enid ===
- Chisholm High School
- Enid High School
- Oklahoma Bible Academy

=== Waukomis ===
- Pioneer-Pleasant Vale High School
- Waukomis High School

== Garvin County ==
- Elmore City-Pernell High School, Elmore City
- Lindsay High School, Lindsay
- Maysville High School, Maysville
- Paoli High School, Paoli
- Pauls Valley High School, Pauls Valley
- Stratford Junior-Senior High School, Stratford
- Wynnewood High School, Wynnewood

== Grady County ==
- Alex Junior-Senior High School, Alex
- Amber-Pocasset High School, Amber
- Bridge Creek High School, Blanchard
- Chickasha High School, Chickasha
- Minco High School, Minco
- Ninnekah Senior High School, Ninnekah
- Rush Springs High School, Rush Springs
- Tuttle High School, Tuttle
- Verden High School, Verden

== Grant County ==
- Deer Creek-Lamont High School, Lamont
- Medford High School, Medford
- Pond Creek-Hunter Junior-Senior High School, Pond Creek

== Greer County ==
- Granite High School, Granite
- Mangum High School, Mangum

== Harmon County ==
- Hollis High School, Hollis

== Harper County ==
- Buffalo High School, Buffalo
- Laverne High School, Laverne

== Haskell County ==
- Keota High School, Keota
- Kinta High School, Kinta
- McCurtain High School, McCurtain
- Stigler High School, Stigler

== Hughes County ==
- Calvin High School, Calvin
- Dustin High School, Dustin
- Stuart High School, Stuart
- Wetumka High School, Watumka

=== Holdenville ===
- Holdenville High School
- Moss High School

== Jackson County ==
- Blair High School, Blair
- Duke High School, Duke
- Eldorado High School, Eldorado
- Olustee High School, Olustee

=== Altus ===
- Altus High School
- Navajo High School

== Jefferson County ==
- Ringling High School, Ringling
- Ryan High School, Ryan
- Waurika High School, Waurika

== Johnston County ==
- Coleman High School, Coleman
- Milburn High School, Milburn
- Mill Creek High School, Mill Creek
- Tishomingo High School, Tishomingo
- Wapanucka High School, Wapanucka

== Kay County ==
- Blackwell High School, Blackwell
- Newkirk High School, Newkirk
- Ponca City High School, Ponca City
- Tonkawa High School, Tonkawa

== Kingfisher County ==
- Cashion High School, Cashion
- Dover High School, Dover
- Hennessey High School, Hennessey
- Kingfisher High School, Kingfisher
- Lomega High School, Omega
- Okarche High School, Okarche
- Piedmont High School, Piedmont

== Kiowa County ==
- Hobart High School, Hobart
- Lone Wolf Junior-Senior High School, Lone Wolf
- Mountain View-Gotebo High School, Mountain View
- Snyder High School, Snyder

== Latimer County ==
- Panola High School, Panola
- Red Oak High School, Red Oak
- Wilburton High School, Wilburton

== Le Flore County ==
- Arkoma High School, Arkoma
- Bokoshe High School, Bokoshe
- Buffalo Valley High School, Talihina
- Cameron High School, Cameron
- Heavener High School, Heavener
- Howe High School, Howe
- Le Flore High School, Le Flore
- Panama High School, Panama
- Pocola High School, Pocola
- Poteau High School, Poteau
- Spiro High School, Spiro
- Talihina High School, Talihina
- Whitesboro High School, Whitesboro
- Wister High School, Wister

== Lincoln County ==
- Agra High School, Agra
- Carney High School, Carney
- Chandler High School, Chandler
- Davenport High School, Davenport
- Meeker High School, Meeker
- Prague High School, Prague
- Stroud High School, Stroud
- Wellston High School, Wellston

== Logan County ==
- Coyle High School, Coyle
- Crescent High School, Crescent
- Guthrie High School, Guthrie
- Mulhall-Orlando High School, Orlando

== Love County ==
- Marietta High School, Marietta
- Thackerville High School, Thackerville
- Turner High School, Burneyville

== Major County ==
- Fairview High School, Fairview
- Ringwood High School, Ringwood

== Marshall County ==
- Kingston High School, Kingston
- Madill High School, Madill

== Mayes County ==
- Adair High School, Adair
- Chouteau-Mazie High School, Chouteau
- Locust Grove High School, Locust Grove
- Pryor High School, Pryor
- Salina High School, Salina

== McClain County ==
- Blanchard High School, Blanchard
- Dibble High School, Dibble
- Newcastle High School, Newcastle
- Purcell High School, Purcell
- Washington High School, Washington
- Wayne High School, Wayne

== McCurtain County ==
- Battiest High School, Battiest
- Broken Bow High School, Broken Bow
- Eagletown High School, Eagletown
- Haworth High School, Haworth
- Idabel High School, Idabel
- Smithville High School, Smithville
- Valliant High School, Valliant
- Wright City High School, Wright City

== McIntosh County ==
- Checotah High School, Checotah
- Eufaula High School, Eufaula
- Hanna High School, Hanna
- Midway High School, Council Hill

== Murray County ==
- Davis High School, Davis

=== Sulphur ===
- Oklahoma School for the Deaf
- Sulphur High School

== Muskogee County ==
- Braggs High School, Braggs
- Fort Gibson High School, Fort Gibson
- Haskell High School, Haskell
- Oktaha High School, Oktaha
- Porum High School, Porum
- Warner High School, Warner
- Webbers Falls High School, Webbers Falls

=== Muskogee ===
- Hilldale High School
- Muskogee High School
- Oklahoma School for the Blind

== Noble County ==
- Billings High School, Billings
- Frontier High School, Red Rock
- Morrison High School, Morrison
- Perry High School, Perry

== Nowata County ==
- Nowata High School, Nowata

=== South Coffeyville ===
- Oklahoma Union High School
- South Coffeyville High School

== Okfuskee County ==
- Boley High School, Boley
- Mason High School, Mason
- Okemah High School, Okemah
- Paden High School, Paden

=== Weleetka ===
- Graham High School
- Weleetka High School

== Oklahoma County ==
- Bethany High School, Bethany
- Choctaw High School, Choctaw
- Deer Creek High School, Edmond
- Jones High School, Jones
- Luther High School, Luther
- Star Spencer High School, Spencer

=== Del City ===
- Christian Heritage Academy
- Del City High School
- Destiny Christian School

=== Edmond ===
- Edmond Memorial High School
- Edmond North High School
- Edmond Santa Fe High School
- Oklahoma Christian School
- Providence Hall Classical Christian School

=== Harrah ===
- Harrah High School
- Oklahoma Academy

=== Midwest City ===
- Carl Albert High School
- Midwest City High School

=== Oklahoma City ===
==== Public ====
- ASTEC Charter Schools
- Capitol Hill High School
- Classen School of Advanced Studies
- Crooked Oak High School
- Dove Science Academy High School OKC
- Douglass High School
- Emerson North Alternative High School
- Emerson South Mid-High School
- Grant High School
- Harding Charter Preparatory High School
- Harding Fine Arts Academy
- John Marshall High School
- Millwood High School
- Northeast Academy
- Northwest Classen High School
- Oklahoma Centennial High School
- Putnam City High School
- Putnam City North High School
- Putnam City West High School
- Putnam Heights Academy
- Santa Fe South High School
- Santa Fe South Pathways Middle College
- Southeast High School
- Star Spencer High School
- Western Heights High School

==== Private ====
- Bishop McGuinness High School
- Casady School
- Crossings Christian School
- Heritage Hall School
- Mount Saint Mary High School
- Oklahoma School of Science and Mathematics

== Okmulgee County ==
- Beggs High School, Beggs
- Dewar High School, Dewar
- Morris High School, Morris
- Okmulgee High School, Okmulgee
- Preston High School, Preston
- Schulter High School, Schulter

=== Henryetta ===
- Henryetta High School
- Wilson High School

== Osage County ==
- Barnsdall High School, Barnsdall
- Hominy High School, Hominy
- Pawhuska High School, Pawuhuska
- Prue High School, Prue
- Shidler High School, Shidler
- Skiatook High School, Skiatook
- Woodland High School, Fairfax
- Wynona High School, Wynona

== Ottawa County ==
- Afton High School, Afton
- Commerce High School, Commerce
- Fairland High School, Fairland
- Miami High School, Miami
- Quapaw High School, Quapaw
- Wyandotte High School, Wyandotte

== Pawnee County ==
- Cleveland High School, Cleveland
- Pawnee High School, Pawnee

== Payne County ==
- Cushing High School, Cushing
- Glencoe High School, Glencoe
- Perkins-Tryon High School, Perkins
- Ripley High School, Ripley
- Stillwater High School, Stillwater
- Yale High School, Yale

== Pittsburg County ==
- Byng High School, Bying
- Canadian High School, Canadian
- Crowder High School, Crowder
- Haileyville High School, Haileyville
- Indianola High School, Indianola
- Kiowa High School, Kiowa
- Pittsburg Public School, Pittsburg
- Quinton High School, Quinton
- Savanna High School, Savanna

=== Hartshorne ===
- Hartshorne High School
- Jones Academy

=== McAlester ===
- Lakewood Christian High School
- McAlester Christian Academy
- McAlester High School

== Pontotoc County ==
- Byng High School, Byng

== Pottawatomie County ==
- Asher High School, Asher
- Dale High School, Dale
- Earlsboro High School, Earlsboro
- Macomb High School, Macomb
- Maud High School, Maud
- McLoud High School, McLoud
- Tecumseh High School, Tecumseh
- Wanette High School, Wanette

=== Shawnee ===
- Bethel High School
- Liberty Academy
- North Rock Creek High School
- Shawnee High School

== Pushmataha County ==
- Antlers High School, Antlers
- Clayton High School, Clayton
- Moyers High School, Moyers
- Rattan High School, Rattan

== Roger Mills County ==
- Cheyenne High School, Cheyenne
- Hammon High School, Hammon
- Leedey High School, Leedey
- Reydon High School, Reydon
- Sweetwater High School, Sweetwater

== Rogers County ==
- Catoosa High School, Catoosa
- Chelsea High School, Chelsea
- Foyil High School, Foyil
- Inola High School, Inola
- Oologah-Talala High School, Oologah

=== Claremore ===
- Claremore High School
- Sequoyah High School
- Verdigris High School

== Seminole County ==
- Bowlegs High School, Bowlegs
- Butner High School, Cromwell
- Konawa High School, Konawa
- New Lima High School, Lima
- Sasakwa High School, Sasakwa
- Wewoka High School, Wewoka

=== Seminole ===
- Seminole High School
- Strother High School
- Varnum High School

== Sequoyah County ==
- Gans High School, Gans
- Gore High School, Gore
- Muldrow High School, Muldrow
- Roland High School, Roland
- Vian High School, Vian

=== Sallisaw ===
- Central High School
- Sallisaw High School

== Stephens County ==
- Comanche High School, Comanche
- Velma-Alma High School, Velma

=== Duncan ===
- Duncan High School
- Empire High School

=== Marlow ===
- Bray-Doyle High School
- Central High High School
- Marlow High School

== Texas County ==
- Guymon High School, Guymon
- Hardesty High School, Hardesty
- Hooker High School, Hooker
- Texhoma High School, Texhoma
- Tyrone High School, Tyrone

=== Goodwell ===
- Goodwell High School
- Yarbrough High School

== Tillman County ==
- Davidson High School, Davidson
- Frederick High School, Frederick
- Grandfield High School, Grandfield
- Tipton High School, Tipton

== Tulsa County ==
- Bixby High School, Bixby
- Broken Arrow Senior High/Freshman Academy, Broken Arrow
- Charles Page High School, Sand Springs
- Collinsville High School, Collinsville
- Glenpool High School, Glenpool
- Jenks High School, Jenks
- Liberty High School, Mounds
- Sperry High School, Sperry

=== Owasso ===
- Owasso High School
- Owasso Ram Academy

=== Tulsa ===
==== Public ====
- Berryhill High School
- Booker T. Washington High School
- Central High School
- Dove Science Academy
- East Central High School
- Edison Preparatory School
- McLain High School
- Memorial High School
- Nathan Hale High School
- Tulsa Honor Academy High School
- Will Rogers High School
- Daniel Webster High School
- Union High School

==== Private ====
- Bishop Kelley High School
- Cascia Hall Preparatory School
- Holland Hall
- Metro Christian Academy
- Mingo Valley Christian School
- Saint Augustine Academy
- Tulsa School of Arts and Sciences
- Wright Christian Academy

== Wagoner County ==
- Coweta High School, Coweta
- Okay High School, Okay
- Porter Consolidated High School, Porter

=== Wagoner ===
- Wagoner Christian School
- Wagoner High School

== Washington County ==
- Caney Valley High School, Ramona
- Copan High School, Copan
- Dewey High School, Dewey

=== Bartlesville ===
- Bartlesville High School
- Wesleyan Christian High School

== Washita County ==
- Burns Flat-Dill City High School, Burns Flat
- Canute High School, Canute
- Cordell High School, Cordell
- Corn Bible Academy, Corn
- Blanche Thomas High School, Sentinel

== Woods County ==
- Alva High School, Alva
- Freedom High School, Freedom
- Waynoka High School, Waynoka

== Woodward County ==
- Fort Supply High School, Fort Supply
- Mooreland High School, Mooreland
- Sharon-Mutual High School, Mutual
- Woodward High School, Woodward
