= List of private schools in Oklahoma =

Oklahoma has ninety-six accredited private schools—twenty private schools accredited by the Oklahoma State Department of Education and seventy-six accredited by the Oklahoma Private School Accreditation Commission.

== Schools accredited by the Oklahoma State Department of Education ==
- Roman Catholic Archdiocese of Oklahoma City, Oklahoma City, Oklahoma County
- Bishop Kelley High School, Tulsa, Tulsa County
- Bishop McGuinness Catholic High School, Oklahoma City, Oklahoma County
- Cascia Hall Preparatory School, Tulsa, Tulsa County
- Cookson Hills Christian School, Kansas, Adair County
- Corn Bible Academy, Corn, Washita County
- Diocese Of Tulsa, Tulsa, Tulsa County
- Jane Brooks School For The Deaf, Chickasha, Grady County
- Lakeside School, Granite, Greer County
- Metro Christian Academy (Oklahoma), Tulsa, Tulsa County
- Monte Cassino School, Tulsa, Tulsa County
- Mount Saint Mary High School, Oklahoma City, Oklahoma County
- Oklahoma Job Corps Academy, Tulsa, Tulsa County
- Oklahoma School for the Deaf, Sulphur, Murray County
- Parkview-Ok. School For The Blind, Muskogee, Muskogee County
- St. John Christian Heritage, Oklahoma City, Oklahoma County
- St. Paul's Lutheran School (Oklahoma), Enid, Garfield County
- Town And Country School, Tulsa, Tulsa County
- The University School for Gifted and Talented Children at the University of Tulsa, Tulsa, Tulsa County
- Victory Christian School, Tulsa, Tulsa County
- Wesleyan Christian School, Bartlesville, Washington County

== Schools accredited by the Oklahoma Private School Accreditation Commission ==
- Academy of Classical Christian Studies, Oklahoma City, Oklahoma County
- All Saints Catholic School, Broken Arrow, Tulsa County
- All Saints Catholic School, Norman, Cleveland County
- Ardmore Christian Academy, Ardmore, Carter County
- Bishop John Carroll School, Oklahoma City, Oklahoma County
- Bristow Adventist School, Bristow, Creek County
- Casady School, Oklahoma City, Oklahoma County
- Central Seventh-day Adventist, Oklahoma City, Oklahoma County
- Christ the King Catholic School, Oklahoma City, Oklahoma County
- Christian Heritage Academy, Del City, Oklahoma County
- Claremore Adventist Elementary, Claremore, Rogers County
- Claremore Christian School, Claremore, Rogers County
- Corn Bible Academy, Corn, Washita County
- Community Christian School, Norman, OK, Cleveland County
- Crossings Christian School, Oklahoma City, Oklahoma County
- Destiny Christian School, Oklahoma City, Oklahoma County
- Eagle Point Christian Academy, Sapulpa, Creek County
- Emmanuel Christian School (Oklahoma), Enid, Garfield County
- Evangelistic Temple School, Tulsa, Tulsa County
- Faith Academy Christian School, Midwest City, Oklahoma County
- Family Of Faith Christian School, Shawnee, Pottawatomie County
- First Lutheran School, Ponca City, Kay County
- Good Shepherd Lutheran School, Midwest City, Oklahoma County
- Grace Christian School, Broken Arrow, Tulsa County
- Happy Hands Educational Center, Tulsa, Tulsa County
- Harvest Christian School, Oklahoma City, Oklahoma County
- Harvest Life School, Midwest City, Oklahoma County
- Heritage Hall School, Oklahoma City, Oklahoma County
- Hillsdale Christian School, Hillsdale, Garfield County
- Holland Hall School, Tulsa, Tulsa County
- Holy Family Cathedral School, Tulsa, Tulsa County
- Holy Trinity School, Okarche, Kingfisher County
- Immanuel Christian Academy, Broken Arrow, Tulsa County
- Ketchum Adventist Academy, Vinita, Craig County
- King's Gate Christian School, Oklahoma City, Oklahoma County
- Lakewood Christian School, McAlester, Pittsburg County
- Liberty Academy, Shawnee, Pottawatomie County
- Life Christian Academy, Oklahoma City, Oklahoma County
- Lawton Academy, Lawton, Oklahoma
- Lincoln Christian School, Tulsa, Tulsa County
- Little Light House, Tulsa, Tulsa County
- Marian Academy, Okmulgee, Okmulgee County
- Marquette Catholic School, Tulsa, Tulsa County
- Messiah Lutheran School, Oklahoma City, Oklahoma County
- Mingo Valley Christian School, Tulsa, Tulsa County
- Oak Hall Episcopal School, Ardmore, Carter County
- Oklahoma Bible Academy, Enid, Garfield County
- Oklahoma Christian Academy, Edmond, Oklahoma County
- Oklahoma Christian School, Edmond, Oklahoma County
- Opportunity Center, Ponca City, Kay County
- Parkview Adventist Academy, Oklahoma City, Oklahoma County
- Ponca City Christian Academy, Ponca City, Kay County
- Regent Preparatory School, Tulsa, Tulsa County
- Rejoice Christian School, Owasso, Tulsa County
- Riverfield Country Day School, Tulsa, Tulsa County
- Rosary School, Oklahoma City, Oklahoma County
- Sacred Heart Catholic School, Oklahoma City, Oklahoma County
- Sallisaw Christian School, Sallisaw, Sequoyah County
- School Of Saint Mary, Tulsa, Tulsa County
- Southpark Christian School, Tulsa, Tulsa County
- Southwest Covenant School, Yukon, Canadian County
- St. Catherine Catholic School, Tulsa, Tulsa County
- St. Charles Borromeo School, Warr Acres, Oklahoma County
- St. Elizabeth Ann Seton School, Edmond, Oklahoma County
- St. Eugene Catholic School, Oklahoma City, Oklahoma County
- St. James Catholic School, Oklahoma City, Oklahoma County
- St. John Nepomuk School, Yukon, Canadian County
- St. John School, Bartlesville, Washington County
- St. John's Episcopal School, Oklahoma City, Oklahoma County
- St. John's Lutheran School, Moore, Cleveland County
- St. Joseph Catholic School (Enid, Oklahoma), Enid, Garfield County
- St. Joseph School, Muskogee, Muskogee County
- St. Mary Catholic School, Lawton, Comanche County
- St. Mary's School, Ponca City, Kay County
- St. Mary's Catholic School, Guthrie, Logan County
- St. Mary's Episcopal School, Edmond, Oklahoma County
- St. Philip Neri Catholic School, Oklahoma City, Oklahoma County
- St. Pius X Catholic School, Tulsa, Tulsa County
- Sts. Peter And Paul School, Kingfisher, Kingfisher County
- Sts. Peter And Paul School, Tulsa, Tulsa County
- Summit Christian Academy (Oklahoma), Broken Arrow, Tulsa County
- Tulsa Adventist Jr. Academy, Tulsa, Tulsa County
- Victory Life Academy, Durant, Bryan County
- Villa Teresa School, Oklahoma City, Oklahoma County
- Western Oaks Baptist, Bethany, Oklahoma County
- Western Oklahoma Christian School, Clinton, Custer County
- Westminster School (Oklahoma), Oklahoma City, Oklahoma County
- William Bradford Christian School, Pryor, Mayes County
- Wright Christian Academy, Tulsa, Tulsa County

== Schools accredited by the National Association of Private Schools ==
- Preach Unto Them Jesus Christian Academy, Oklahoma City, Oklahoma NW 16th & Penn
- Goodland Academy, Hugo, Choctaw County
- McAlester Christian Academy, McAlester, Oklahoma, Pittsburg County
- Overland Christian Schools, Overland Park, Kansas

REM Christian Academy, Ralston, OK 74650

- Riverside Christian Academy, Norman, Oklahoma
- Wildflower: An Acton Academy, Oklahoma City, Oklahoma County

== Schools accredited by the Association of Christian Schools International ==
- Corn Bible Academy, Corn, Washita County
- Crossings Christian School, Oklahoma City, Oklahoma County
- Eagle Point Christian Academy, Sapulpa, Creek County
- Oklahoma Bible Academy, Enid, Garfield County, Oklahoma
- Lawton Christian School, Lawton, Comanche County, Oklahoma

== See also ==
- List of school districts in Oklahoma
- List of vocational technical schools in Oklahoma
- List of colleges and universities in Oklahoma
