= University School =

University School may refer to:

- University Schools (Colorado), a K–12 charter school in Greeley, Colorado
- NSU University School, a school on the Nova Southeastern University campus in Fort Lauderdale, Florida
- University Academy (Missouri), a pre-K–12 charter public school in Kansas City, Missouri
- University School (Ohio) is a boys' private school in Ohio
- Kent State University School, a former K–12 laboratory school, Kent, Ohio
- University School (Tulsa, Oklahoma), a K–8 school in Tulsa, Oklahoma
- University School of Jackson, a private pre-K–12 school in Jackson, Tennessee
- University School of Nashville, a private K–12 school in Nashville, Tennessee
- University School of Milwaukee, a private K–12 school in Milwaukee, Wisconsin

== See also ==
- University High School (disambiguation)
- University Academy (disambiguation)
