= Santa Fe South Pathways Middle College =

Location
- OCCC, 7777 S. May Ave; Oklahoma City, Oklahoma 73159; United States; 35.3874°N 97.5699°W

Information
- Type: Public charter high school
- Established: 2001 (as Pathways Middle College High School); 2014 (as Santa Fe South Pathways Middle College)
- School district: Santa Fe South Schools
- NCES School ID: 400079602831
- Principal: Christopher D. McAdoo
- Grades: 9–12
- Enrollment: 394 (2024–25)
- Website: pathwaysmiddlecollege.org

Santa Fe South Pathways Middle College is a public charter school in Oklahoma City, Oklahoma, United States, located on the campus of Oklahoma City Community College (OCCC). Part of the Santa Fe South Schools charter district, it serves students in grades 9–12 using a middle college model in which students may earn an associate degree from OCCC concurrently with their high school diploma. In 2023, U.S. News & World Report ranked it the #1 charter high school in Oklahoma.

== History ==
=== Founding under OKCPS (2001–2014) ===
The school was founded in 2001 under the Oklahoma City Public Schools (OKCPS) district as Pathways Middle College High School, operating on the OCCC campus with a staff of five teachers. It was the first middle college program introduced in the state of Oklahoma. The school opened with an eighth-grade class and expanded upward by one grade level annually.

After approximately fourteen years of operation, OKCPS closed the school in 2014, citing insufficient growth toward the middle college goal. The principal was notified by letter from OKCPS on April 25, 2014. At the time of the closure announcement, the school enrolled 71 students.

=== Reopening under Santa Fe South (2014–present) ===
Following the announced closure, parents of enrolled students approached Santa Fe South Schools, a charter district serving south Oklahoma City. Santa Fe South Superintendent Chris Brewster reached an agreement with officials from OKCPS and OCCC to reopen the school in July 2014 as a public charter school within the Santa Fe South district, hiring Christopher McAdoo, a former assistant principal at Harding Fine Arts Academy, as its new director. For its initial two years within the Santa Fe South district, Pathways operated under the administrative umbrella of Santa Fe South High School before receiving a distinct site identifier from the Oklahoma State Department of Education. By its second full school year under new leadership, enrollment had more than doubled, rising from 71 students to 186. Following the reopening, the school reported a graduation rate of 97%.

In 2021, Santa Fe South Schools shifted its charter authorizer from OKCPS to Oklahoma City Community College.

== Academics ==
Starting in their second semester of sophomore year, students may apply for concurrent enrollment in OCCC courses and take on up to 16 college credit hours per semester. Through their placement on OCCC's campus, students can use college facilities such as the library, gym, and labs, and are expected to complete 18 hours of community service each semester. The school uses the Summit Learning platform for its college-preparatory curriculum and assigns each student a faculty mentor for academic guidance and support.

In 2023, U.S. News & World Report ranked Pathways the #1 charter high school in Oklahoma and the #1 non-magnet school in the state. The school earned a B grade on the 2018-19 state report card. The Oklahoma State Department of Education's 2024–25 school report card gave the school an overall grade of A, ranking it 8th of 473 high schools statewide for overall performance and 7th of 469 for academic achievement. The school ranked 1st of 465 statewide for assessment participation, with 100% of students completing state-required assessments. In the same report card, the school received a D grade for chronic absenteeism, ranking 365th of 472 high schools on that measure. In 2024, the school was named the Class 2A state champion for Oklahoma's Promise, a state scholarship program funding in-state college tuition for qualifying students.

== Student body ==
As of the 2024–2025 school year, the school enrolled 394 students across grades 9–12, with 120 ninth graders, 118 tenth graders, 79 eleventh graders, and 77 twelfth graders. By race and ethnicity, 351 students (89%) identified as Hispanic, 20 (5%) as white, 9 (2%) as Black or African American, 9 (2%) as two or more races, 2 as American Indian or Alaska Native, 2 as Asian, and 1 as Native Hawaiian or Pacific Islander. A total of 346 students (approximately 88%) qualified for free or reduced-price lunch.

== Recognition ==
The school's graduating classes have been recognized by the Oklahoma Legislature on multiple occasions. In May 2023, State Senator Michael Brooks-Jimenez (D-Oklahoma City), who also serves as president of the Santa Fe South Schools board of directors, honored the school's graduating class in the Oklahoma State Senate chamber. In 2025, Brooks-Jimenez and State Representative Arturo Alonso-Sandoval welcomed the senior class to the Senate chamber; the 73 graduates had together accumulated more than 3,000 college credit hours, with 53 receiving associate degrees alongside their high school diplomas.

== See also ==
- Santa Fe South Schools
- Oklahoma City Community College
- List of high schools in Oklahoma
- Middle College Program
