= Dove Science Academy =

Dove Science Academy may refer to:

- Dove Schools (Oklahoma Charter School District)
- Dove Science Academy High School OKC (Oklahoma Charter High School)
