= Uni High =

Uni High may refer to:

- University High School, Melbourne
- University Laboratory High School of Urbana, Illinois
- Other University High Schools also use it as an abbreviated name.
