= The Sea Devil's Eye =

2000 novel by Mel Odom

- Cover of the first edition
- Author: Mel Odom
- Language: English
- Genre: Fantasy novel
- Publisher: TSR, Inc.
- Publication date: 2000
- Publication place: United States
- Media type: Print (Paperback)
- Preceded by: Under Fallen Stars

The Sea Devil's Eye is a 2000 novel by Mel Odom set in the Forgotten Realms campaign setting. It is the last book in the Threat from the Sea Trilogy.

== Plot summary ==
Iakhovas has caused more destruction than any force since the Time of Troubles, but his true objective has been a mystery until now.

== Conception ==
Author Mel Odom intended the Threat from the Sea trilogy to have major implications for the Forgotten Realms setting: "Basically, an evil that has been buried for thousands of years has risen from the sea and turned against the surface world. A lot happens in these books, and the map of Toril will not be the same afterward. A lot of people are going to be shocked and amazed." Dungeons & Dragons game sourcebook tie-ins were planned to coincide with the novels, allowing players to follow the events of the trilogy in their own campaigns.
