= Mel Odom (writer) =

American writer

- Born: December 16, 1957 (age 68); California, U.S.
- Education: Byng High School; East Central University
- Occupation: Writer
- Children: 5
- Writing career
- Pen name: Don Pendleton
- Genres: Science fiction; fantasy
- Notable awards: Alex Award (2002)

Mel Odom (born December 16, 1957, in California) is an American writer known primarily for science fiction and fantasy novels set in existing properties.

== Education ==
Odom graduated from Byng High School in Byng, Oklahoma in May 1976, and later graduated with a bachelor's degree in English from East Central University in Ada, Oklahoma. He teaches undergraduate courses at the Gaylord College of Journalism and Mass Communication in the Professional Writing program at the University of Oklahoma.

== Career ==
Odom sold his first book in January 1988 and wrote dozens more books over the next ten years. He wrote two novels for the F.R.E.E.Lancers campaign setting for TSR's Top Secret/S.I. role-playing game, F.R.E.E.Lancers and F.R.E.E.Fall. He followed these with his first Forgotten Realms novel in 1998, The Lost Library of Cormanthyr, and then his Threat from the Sea trilogy.

Odom has written dozens of novels in several fields – action-adventure, computer strategy guides, fantasy, game-related fiction, horror, juvenile, movie novelizations, science fiction, and young adult – as well as comics.

Odom wrote several novels in the Forgotten Realms series, including the trilogy The Threat from the Sea, and two short stories. He has gained renown with his The Rover and Left Behind Apocalypse series, and three novels for the NCIS franchise.

He has published original novels for popular TV shows, including Roswell and Sabrina, the Teenage Witch. The most popular show for which he has written original novels is Buffy the Vampire Slayer. He has also written novelizations of movies, including: Blade starring Wesley Snipes, and xXx starring Vin Diesel.

One of his best known fantasy novels is The Rover (2001), which in 2002 won the Alex Award, an American Library Association award given to novels written for adults that would also appeal to young readers. Three sequels have appeared since then: Destruction of the Books (2004), Lord of the Libraries (2005), and The Quest for the Trilogy (2007). These stories are high fantasy in the style of J. R. R. Tolkien's The Lord of the Rings.

In 2003, he published Apocalypse Dawn, a military spin-off of the enormously popular Left Behind Series; Odom's first book in the series was a 2004 Christy Award finalist.

Odom also writes DVD, HD DVD, and Blu-ray reviews for Audio Video Revolution.

He is known to have written under several pen names, among others Jordan Gray. Additionally, under the pseudonym of Don Pendleton, Odom has written several Mack Bolan novels, an action-adventure series.

On February 7, 2015, it was announced that Odom would be writing the new companion novel to the upcoming Shadowrun: Hong Kong game. The novel was scheduled to be released in December 2015, coinciding with game. Shadowrun: Hong Kong is the third crowdfunded game set in the Shadowrun universe by game developer Harebrained Schemes.

== Personal life ==
He lives in Moore, Oklahoma, with his wife and five children. By 1998, he had begun playing an AD&D Forgotten Realms campaign with the two oldest.

== Bibliography ==
Mack Bolan novels

(under pen name Don Pendleton)

- War Born (1989)
- Storm Trilogy
  - Storm Warning (1992)
  - Eye of the Storm (1992)
  - Storm Burst (1992)
- Crimson Tide (2002)
- The Moon Shadow Trilogy
  - Nuclear Game (2003)
  - Deadly Pursuit (2003)
  - Final Play (2003)

Shadowrun novels

- Preying for Keeps (1996) – ISBN 0-451-45374-3
- Headhunters (1997) – ISBN 0-451-45630-0
- Run Hard, Die Fast (1999) – ISBN 0-451-45741-2

F.R.E.E.Lancers novels from Top Secret (role-playing game)

- F.R.E.E.Lancers (1995) ISBN 0-7869-0113-6
- F.R.E.E.Fall (1996) ISBN 0-7869-0493-3

The Secret World of Alex Mack novel

- In Hot Pursuit (1998)

Sabrina, the Teenage Witch novels

- Harvest Moon (1998)
- Sabrina Goes to Rome (1998)
- I'll Zap Manhattan (1999)
- Mummy Dearest (2000)
- Pirate Pandemonium (2001)
- Dream Boat (2001)
- Tiger Tale (2002)

Buffyverse stories

- Buffy the Vampire Slayer novels
  - Unnatural Selection (1999)
  - Revenant (2001)
  - Crossings (2002)
  - Cursed (2003)
- Angel novels
  - Redemption (2000)
  - Bruja (2001)
  - Image (2002)
- Tales of the Slayer short stories
  - "Silent Screams" (2001)
  - "Ch'ing Shih" (2003)

Might and Magic novel

- The Sea of Mist (2001)

The Rover series

- The Rover (2001)
- Destruction of the Books (2004)
- Lord of the Libraries (2005)
- The Quest for the Trilogy (2007)

Diablo novel

- The Black Road (2002)

Left Behind: Military series

- Apocalypse Dawn (2003)
- Apocalypse Crucible (2004)
- Apocalypse Burning (2004)
- Apocalypse Unleashed (2008)

NCIS novels

- Paid in Blood (2006)
- Blood Evidence (2007)
- Blood Lines (2008)

Identity Trilogy

- Android: Golem (2011)
- Android: Mimic (2012)
- Android: Rebel (2014)

Hunter's League series

- A Conspiracy Revealed (2005)
- The Mystery Unravels (2005)
- The Secret Explodes (2005)
- His Legacy Avenged (2006)

Rogue Angel series

(under pen name Alex Archer)

- Destiny (2006)
- The Spider Stone (2006)
- Forbidden City (2006)
- God of Thunder (2007)
- Serpent's Kiss (2008)

Hellgate: London novel

- Exodus (2007)
- Goetia (2008)
- Covenant (2008)

Forgotten Realms novels and anthologies

- The Lost Library of Cormanthyr (1998)
- Rising Tide (1999)
- Under Fallen Stars (1999)
- Realms of the Deep (2000)
- The Sea Devil's Eye (2000)
- The Jewel of Turmish (2002)
- Realms of War (2008)

Gamma World novels

- Sooner Dead (2011)

A Blackpool Mystery series (based on bestselling game series Mystery Case Files)

(under pen name Jordan Gray)

- Stolen (2010)
- Vanished (2010)
- Submerged (2011)
- Unearthed (2011)

Makaum War series

- Master Sergeant: The Makaum War: Book One (2015)
- Guerilla: The Makaum War: Book Two (2015)
- Warlord: The Makaum War: Book Three (2020)

Other novels

- Stalker Analog (1993)
- Lethal Interface (1993)
- Hunters of the Dark Sea (2003)
