= Don Kaiser =

American baseball player (born 1935)

- Pitcher
- Born: February 3, 1935 (age 91); Byng, Oklahoma, U.S.
- Batted: Right Threw: Right

MLB debut
- July 20, 1955, for the Chicago Cubs

Last MLB appearance
- September 24, 1957, for the Chicago Cubs

MLB statistics
- Win–loss record: 6–15
- Earned run average: 4.15
- Innings: 240 2/3
- Stats at Baseball Reference

Teams
- Chicago Cubs (1955–1957)

Clyde Donald Kaiser (born February 3, 1935) is an American former professional baseball player and a pitcher in Major League Baseball for the Chicago Cubs between 1955 and 1957. A high school phenom from Byng, Oklahoma, Kaiser was the first "Bonus Baby" signed by the Cub franchise. He threw and batted right-handed and was listed as 6 feet 5 inches (1.96 m) tall and 195 pounds (88 kg).

== Education ==
At Byng High School, Kaiser won 49 of 50 decisions and pitched seven no-hitters and two perfect games. He attended East Central University on a basketball scholarship, but was signed by the Cubs for a $15,000 bonus after one semester.

== Play for the Chicago Cubs ==
Compelled by the bonus rule to spend the first two years of his pro career on the Cubbies' big-league roster, Kaiser worked in only 11 games and 181/3 innings pitched in 1955, with no decisions and a high 5.40 earned run average. He was used sparingly to begin 1956, until June 2, when he received his first starting assignment. Facing the defending world champion Brooklyn Dodgers at Wrigley Field, he allowed only two hits, four bases on balls and one run in a complete game, 8–1 triumph. Almost exactly a month later, on July 1, he shut out the Milwaukee Braves on six hits and only one walk, with five strikeouts. Kaiser made 22 starts for the 1956 Cubs and his career-best 3.59 earned run average was third-best on the team, but his won–lost record was only 4–9, and the Cubs finished eighth and last in the National League at 60–94. He began 1957 in the rotation and in his third start, on May 6, he defeated the New York Giants on six hits, 6–2, at the Polo Grounds, for the sixth and last complete game of his career.

But Kaiser spent the bulk of 1957 in the top-level (Open Classification) Pacific Coast League until he was called up in September. In his one late-season appearance, he turned in a mediocre start against the Cincinnati Redlegs, allowing four earned runs in four innings pitched—just enough to be tagged with Chicago's 4–3 defeat. It was the last appearance of his Cub and major league career. In 58 games pitched, 35 of them starts, Kaiser compiled a 6–15 won–lost mark and a 4.15 career ERA. In 2402/3 innings, he allowed 255 hits and 85 bases on balls, and was credited with 108 strikeouts. His blanking of the Braves in July 1956 was his only career MLB shutout.

== Later life ==
Kaiser would be included in off-season trades to the Braves in December 1957 and the Detroit Tigers in October 1959, but he never returned to the major leagues. He retired from pro ball after the 1961 season.
