= Rising Tide (Odom novel) =

1999 novel by Mel Odom

- Cover of the first edition
- Author: Mel Odom
- Language: English
- Genre: Novel
- Published: 1999
- Publication place: United States
- Media type: Print
- ISBN: 978-0-7869-1312-1
- Followed by: Under Fallen Stars

Rising Tide is a fantasy novel by Mel Odom, set in the world of the Forgotten Realms, and based on the Dungeons & Dragons role-playing game. It is the first novel in "The Threat from the Sea" trilogy. It was published in paperback in January 1999.

== Plot summary ==
Four adventurers – Jherek, Laaqueel, Iakhovas, and Pacys – sail the oceans as each are pulled toward the city of Baldur's Gate.

== Reception ==
A reviewer from Publishers Weekly comments: "Odom does an admirable job of bringing the sea setting and its varied species to life. The novel's detailed fight sequences are tightly packed, making for a fast, exciting read, but Odom leaves its resolution for the next installment of his four-book series."
