= University High School =

University High School may refer to:

== Australia ==
- University High School, Melbourne, Victoria

== Canada ==
- University Hill Secondary School, Vancouver, British Columbia

== United States ==
=== Arizona ===
- University High School (Tolleson)
- University High School (Tucson)

=== California ===
- University High School (Fresno)
- University High School (Irvine, California), also referred to as "Uni"
- University High School (Los Angeles), also referred to as "Uni"
- University High School (Oakland, California)
- University of San Diego High School, formerly known as University High School, and also known as "Uni"
- San Francisco University High School

=== Florida ===
- University High School (Orlando, Florida)
- University High School (Orange City, Florida)
- University School of Nova Southeastern University, Fort Lauderdale

=== Illinois ===
- University High School (Normal, Illinois)
- University Laboratory High School of Urbana, Illinois, also referred to as "Uni"
- University of Chicago Laboratory Schools, the upper classes are nicknamed U-High

=== Elsewhere ===
- University Schools (Greeley, Colorado), in Greeley, Colorado, formerly known as University High School
- Education Laboratory School, in Honolulu, Hawai‘i, formerly known as University High School
- University High School of Indiana, Carmel, Indiana
- Indiana University High School, Bloomington
- Oxford High School (Oxford, Mississippi), known as "University High School" until 1963
- University High School (Michigan), Ann Arbor, Michigan
- University High School (New Jersey), Newark, New Jersey
- University High School (New Mexico), Roswell, Chaves County, New Mexico
- University High School (San Juan), Puerto Rico
- University High School (Waco, Texas)
- University High School (Washington)
- University High School (West Virginia)
- University Laboratory High School of Baton Rouge, Louisiana

== See also ==
- University School (disambiguation)
- University Academy (disambiguation)
