= Westminster School (Oklahoma) =

Location
- 600 Northwest 44th Street; Oklahoma City, Oklahoma 73118; United States
- Coordinates: 35°31′23″N 97°31′34″W

Information
- Type: Private
- Established: 1963
- Principal: Whitney Ashinhurst
- Grades: Pre-K–8
- Colors: Blue and white
- Song: The Westminster School Song
- Accreditation: Independent Schools Association of the Southwest (ISAS)
- Publication: Yearly
- Yearbook: Westminster School Yearbook
- Website: www.westminsterschool.org

Westminster School of Oklahoma City is a private school in Oklahoma City, Oklahoma, United States that was founded in 1963, and admits children from 3 years old through 8th Grade.

Westminster School is accredited by the Independent Schools Association of the Southwest (ISAS) and the State of Oklahoma.
