= Mautra Staley Jones =

American higher education administrator

Dr. Mautra Staley Jones (born 1978) is an American higher education administrator serving as the 11th president of Oklahoma City Community College (OCCC). She took office in March 2022, becoming the first woman and the first person of color to lead OCCC. In November 2025, she was inducted into the Oklahoma Hall of Fame.

== Early life and education ==
Jones was born in Oklahoma City in 1978 and grew up in Ardmore, where her grandmother raised her and where she completed her secondary education at Ardmore Public Schools. She went on to the University of Oklahoma as a first-generation college student, earning a Bachelor of Arts in journalism through the Gaylord College of Journalism and Mass Communication, a program that later recognized her as a Distinguished Alumna.

Following graduation, she moved to Encinitas, California, taking a position at an orthopaedic medical group where she rose to lead its business development operations. She pursued a Master of Business Administration, earned in 2005, at night through the University of Phoenix in San Diego. She later completed a Doctor of Education at Vanderbilt University's Peabody College.

== Career ==
=== Early career ===
The family returned to Oklahoma when her husband Bernard Jones joined the law firm McAfee & Taft, at which point Jones moved into education and nonprofit work. She took on positions with the Foundation for Oklahoma City Public Schools and KIPP Reach College Preparatory School before shifting into higher education administration. At Langston University, she spent seven years in three concurrent roles: Vice President for Institutional Advancement and External Affairs, site administrator for the university's Oklahoma City campus, and executive director of the Langston University Foundation.

=== Oklahoma City Community College (2022–present) ===
Jones was named OCCC's 11th president by the college's Board of Regents on January 31, 2022, and entered office on March 1. The college enrolls more than 23,000 students annually and is the fourth-largest institution of higher education in Oklahoma. According to the Oklahoma Hall of Fame, she was the first African American woman to lead a non-HBCU college or university in the state.

Early in her presidency, the college received designation as a National Center of Academic Excellence in Cyber Defense from the National Security Agency. OCCC also introduced a Fresh Start Initiative, using COVID-19 relief funding to clear outstanding student balances totaling roughly $4 million and allowing approximately 4,500 students to re-enroll without that financial burden. Jones was separately appointed to the National Science Foundation's Committee on Equal Opportunities in Science and Engineering (CEOSE), serving a term from February 2025 through January 2028. She also holds seats on the Higher Learning Commission's Credential Lab Advisory Board and the Association of Community College Trustees President's Advisory Committee.

== Public service ==
Both Governors Mary Fallin and Kevin Stitt appointed Jones to state service, placing her on the Oklahoma Office of Juvenile Affairs board, the Oklahoma Merit Protection Commission, and the Oklahoma standards steering committee. At the municipal level, Mayor David Holt appointed her to the Oklahoma City Civic Center Foundation board.

Her board service has included BancFirst, the Oklahoma Medical Research Foundation, Oklahoma Watch, the Oklahoma City Industrial and Cultural Facilities Trust, and the Oklahoma Hall of Fame.

== Recognition ==
The American Mothers organization named Jones its National Mother of the Year in 2021. In 2023, Forbes included her in its list "10 Top Black Higher Ed CEOs To Watch". The Journal Record honored her as a Most Admired CEO in the public company category in 2023, 2024, and 2025, naming her the category winner in 2024 and 2025. OKC Friday named her its Okcityan of the Year for 2025.

The Oklahoma Hall of Fame inducted Jones into its Class of 2025 at a ceremony on November 13, 2025, at the Arvest Convention Center in Tulsa.

== Personal life ==
Jones and her husband Bernard M. Jones II, a federal judge on the United States District Court for the Western District of Oklahoma, have three children.
