= Santa Fe South Schools =

School district in Oklahoma, United States

Address
- 7000 Crossroads Blvd, Suite 4000 Oklahoma City, Oklahoma, 73149; United States
- Coordinates: 35.3971°N 97.4893°W

District information
- Type: Independent public charter district
- Grades: PK–12
- Established: 2001
- Superintendent: Chris Brewster
- Schools: 10
- NCES District ID: 4000796

Students and staff
- Students: 4,620 (2024–25)

Other information
- Website: santafesouth.org

Santa Fe South Schools (also known as Santa Fe South Charter Schools, or SFS) is a public charter school district in Oklahoma City, Oklahoma, United States, serving students from pre-kindergarten through 12th grade across south Oklahoma City. Founded in 2001, it is the largest brick-and-mortar charter school district in the state of Oklahoma.

== History ==
=== Founding (2001) ===
Santa Fe South was founded in 2001 by Chris Brewster, who had worked in traditional public schools as a music teacher and later as an assistant principal. Brewster launched the school out of a church basement, enrolling 120 ninth-graders with a staff of six teachers and three support personnel, citing the need for aiding inequities between schools in wealthy and low-income parts of Oklahoma City. Oklahoma City Public Schools (OKCPS) served as the district's charter authorizer from its founding through 2021. The school was developed with support from ORO Development Corporation, a local nonprofit active in the area since 1971.

=== Growth and expansion ===
From its single high school campus, Santa Fe South expanded over the following two decades to include elementary, middle, and early childhood programs across south Oklahoma City. Brewster received the Milken Educator Award in 2009 in recognition of his work developing the district. As of the 2024–25 school year, the district enrolls 4,620 students across 10 schools, making it the largest brick-and-mortar charter school district in Oklahoma.

The district operates on an open-enrollment, tuition-free model. When more students apply than seats are available, seats are assigned through a random lottery.

=== 2021 authorizer transition ===
From 2001 through mid-2021, Santa Fe South's charter was authorized by OKCPS. In April 2021, as Santa Fe South was preparing to shift its authorization to Oklahoma City Community College (OCCC), the OKCPS Board of Education voted unanimously to request a state investigative audit of the district for fiscal years 2018–19 and 2019–20. The request cited a $300,000 loan from a nonprofit development corporation connected to Santa Fe South to Sovereign Community School, another Oklahoma City charter school. Superintendent Brewster questioned the timing of the audit request, calling it a "political football". He noted that the audit coincided with the district's planned departure from OKCPS oversight and the resulting loss of authorizer fees OKCPS had collected from Santa Fe South, which Brewster estimated at $4 million over the preceding ten years. OCCC assumed the authorizer role on July 1, 2021.

=== COVID-19 pandemic ===
In August 2021, Superintendent Brewster announced that Santa Fe South would require students to wear masks, making it the first Oklahoma school district to institute such a requirement that school year. The COVID-19 mandate included an opt-out provision to navigate Senate Bill 658, a state law restricting mask requirements to periods of a governor-declared emergency.

== Schools ==
As of the 2024–25 school year, Santa Fe South operates 10 schools across south Oklahoma City.

=== Early childhood and elementary ===
- Santa Fe South Trinity Early Childhood
- Santa Fe South Spero Lower Elementary
- Santa Fe South Spero Upper Elementary
- Santa Fe South Hills Elementary
- Santa Fe South Penn Elementary
- Santa Fe South Shidler Elementary

=== Middle ===
- Santa Fe South Middle School
- Santa Fe South West Middle School

=== High school ===
- Santa Fe South High School
- Santa Fe South Pathways Middle College

== Student demographics ==
The district's student body is approximately 95% Hispanic and serves a predominantly low-income population in south Oklahoma City. As of 2024–25, the district enrolls 4,620 students with a student-to-teacher ratio of 16.73 to 1. About 63% of students are eligible for federally subsidized meals.

== See also ==
- Santa Fe South Pathways Middle College
- Oklahoma City Community College
- Charter schools in the United States
