= University Academy =

University Academy may refer to:

== United Kingdom ==
- University Academy Holbeach
- University Academy Birkenhead, the former name of Birkenhead Park School
- University Academy Kidsgrove, the former name of Kidsgrove Secondary School
- University Academy Liverpool, the former name of King's Leadership Academy Liverpool
- University Academy Warrington, the former name of Padgate Academy

== United States ==
- University Preparatory Academy, San Jose, California
- University Academy (Missouri), Kansas City, Missouri
- University Academy Charter High School, Jersey City, New Jersey

== See also ==
- University High School (disambiguation)
- University School (disambiguation)
