= Dan Bailey (American football) =

American football player (born 1988)

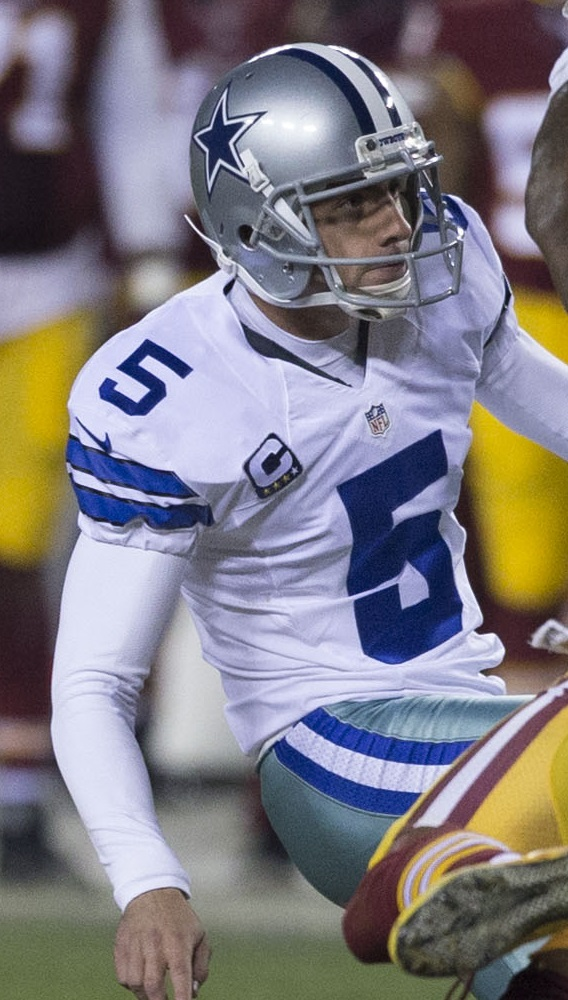
- Bailey with the Dallas Cowboys in 2015

No. 5
- Position: Placekicker

Personal information
- Born: January 26, 1988 (age 38); Oklahoma City, Oklahoma, U.S.
- Listed height: 6 ft 0 in (1.83 m)
- Listed weight: 190 lb (86 kg)

Career information
- High school: Southwest Covenant School (Yukon, Oklahoma)
- College: Oklahoma State (2007–2010)
- NFL draft: 2011: undrafted

Career history
- Dallas Cowboys (2011–2017); Minnesota Vikings (2018–2020)

Awards and highlights
- Second-team All-Pro (2015); Pro Bowl (2015); PFWA All-Rookie Team (2011); Lou Groza Award (2010); Second-team All-American (2010); NCAA scoring leader (2010); Big 12 Special Teams Player of the Year (2010); First-team All-Big 12 (2010)

Career NFL statistics
- Field goals made: 249
- Field goals attempted: 290
- Field goal %: 85.9
- Longest field goal: 56
- Touchbacks: 450
- Stats at Pro Football Reference

Dan Bailey (born January 26, 1988) is an American former professional football player who was a placekicker in the National Football League (NFL). He played college football for the Oklahoma State Cowboys and signed with the Dallas Cowboys as an undrafted free agent in 2011. Bailey spent seven years in Dallas, where he became the franchise's all-time leader in field goals made. Bailey also played for the Minnesota Vikings.

== Early life ==
Born in Oklahoma City, Bailey grew up in Mustang, Oklahoma, and attended Southwest Covenant School where he was an all-state, all-conference kicker and a first-team all-city punter (as selected by The Oklahoman), while playing eight-man football.

As a senior, Bailey had 51 touchbacks in 61 kickoffs. He holds the high school state records for longest field goal (50 yards), most field goals in a season (seven) and career (14). Bailey was also an individual state champion golfer. He graduated from Southwest Covenant in 2007 and was named valedictorian.

== College career ==
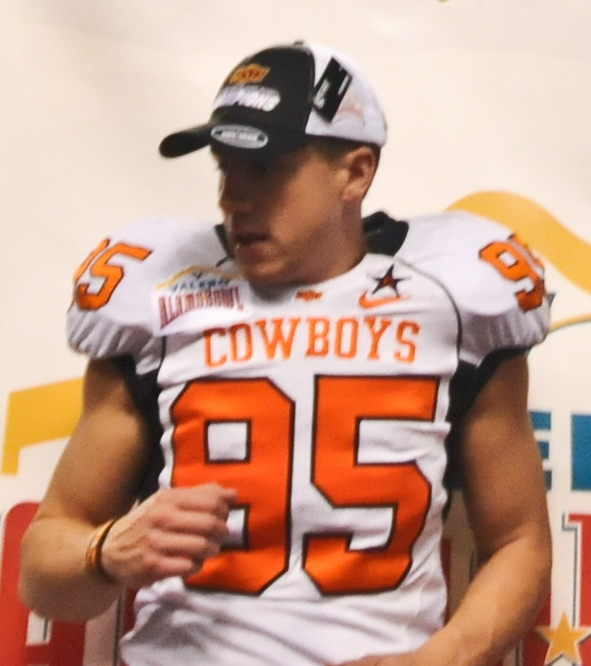
Bailey with the Oklahoma State Cowboys in 2010

Bailey originally accepted to walk on at University of Arkansas, in order to receive an academic scholarship that would cover his tuition. After losing the competition for the starting kicker job, Bailey was approached by head coach Houston Nutt and was told that he would have to pay his own way, so Bailey would not count toward the team's scholarship limit. Forced to leave the school, he spent a year out of college before walking on at Oklahoma State University.

As a true freshman in 2007, Bailey made 20-of-20 extra point kicks but only two-of-four field goals. He made field goals from 27 and 28 yards and missed two attempts beyond 40 yards.

Until the 2008 Holiday Bowl, Bailey made 10 consecutive field goals in his second year (2008). With a 78.9% field goal conversion rate (15-for-19) on the season, he was second in the Big 12 Conference in field goal percentage. Bailey made a career-long 45-yarder in the 2008 Holiday Bowl, a 42–31 loss to Oregon.

Bailey made 46-of-46 extra point attempts and 13-of-18 field goals in 2009 as a junior. In the October 17 game, a 33–17 victory over Missouri, he made 4-of-4 field goals, including a career-long 51-yarder.

In 2010, Bailey made 24-of-28 field goals and 65-of-66 extra points, for an NCAA-leading 149 points. He won the Lou Groza Award for the nation's top kicker following the season. Bailey earned the Big 12 Special teams Player of the Year award. Oklahoma State won the December 2010 Alamo Bowl 36–10 over Arizona, and he made three of three field goals in that game: from 40, 50, and 44 yards.

=== Collegiate statistics ===
Legend
	Led the NCAA
**Bold**	Career high

Dan Bailey
Year	G	XPM	XPA	XP%	FGM	FGA	FG%	Pts
2007	7	20	20	**100.0**	2	4	50.0	26
2008	13	65	65	**100.0**	15	19	78.9	110
2009	12	46	46	**100.0**	13	18	72.2	85
2010	13	**68**	**70**	97.1	**27**	**31**	**87.1**	**149**
Career	**45**	**199**	**201**	**99.0**	**57**	**72**	**79.2**	**370**

== Professional career ==
Pre-draft measurables
Height	Weight	Arm length	Hand span
6 ft 0 1/4 in (1.84 m)	193 lb (88 kg)	31 in (0.79 m)	9 3/4 in (0.25 m)
All values from NFL Combine

=== Dallas Cowboys ===
==== 2011 season ====
Bailey was signed by the Dallas Cowboys as an undrafted free agent following the 2011 NFL draft on July 25. At one point during training camp, he had to compete with three other place kickers who included David Buehler, Shayne Graham and Dave Rayner. Bailey was named the team's kicker at the end of the preseason, with Buehler remaining on the roster as the kickoff specialist.

During a Week 2 27–24 road victory over the San Francisco 49ers, after missing a chip shot attempt in the first quarter, Bailey made a 48-yard field goal to send the game into overtime, and the eventual game-winner from 19 yards. In the next game against the Washington Redskins, Bailey tied a rookie record by converting six field goals, accounting for all of Dallas' points during the narrow 18–16 victory. This was the first time since 2001 that the Cowboys won a game without scoring a touchdown and the sixth time in franchise history. Bailey became the third rookie in NFL history to make six field goals in a game, following in the footsteps of Garo Yepremian, who converted six-of-eight attempts on November 13, 1966, for the Detroit Lions, and Jeff Reed, who made all six tries on December 1, 2002, for the Pittsburgh Steelers. This performance earned Bailey NFC Special Teams Player of the Week honors.

During a Week 11 27–24 overtime road victory over the Redskins, Bailey kicked his second game-winning field goal, a 39-yard kick in overtime. Two weeks later on the road against the Arizona Cardinals, he missed a potential game-winning 49-yard field goal. With the game tied 13–13, with six seconds left in the fourth quarter, Cowboys head coach Jason Garrett called a timeout before the snap, but Bailey's kick was good. Following the time-out, Bailey kicked the field goal short and to the left, leaving many Cowboys fans frustrated, convinced Garrett had just iced his own kicker. In overtime, the Cardinals won 19–13 on a touchdown by LaRod Stephens-Howling. In the next game against the New York Giants, Bailey's first attempt at a game-tying 47-yard field goal was interrupted when Giants coach Tom Coughlin called a time-out, effectively icing the kicker. Bailey's first kicked ball went through the uprights, but Giants defensive end Jason Pierre-Paul blocked Bailey's kick after the Giants' timeout and the Cowboys lost by a score of 37–34.

Bailey had one of the best kicking seasons in franchise and league history by a rookie, making 32-of-37 (86.5%) field goals, second-highest kicking percentage for a rookie, setting a Cowboys rookie record for most field goals made in a game (6), tying Chris Boniol for the second-most consecutive field goals made (26) in club history, and was named to the Pro Football Writers Association All-Rookie team.

==== 2012 season ====
During a Week 3 16–10 victory over the Tampa Bay Buccaneers, Bailey converted three field goals from distances of 32, 26, and 22-yards. His last field goal in the game put Dallas up 16–7, a two-possession lead with 2:47 left. Three weeks later, the Cowboys lost to the Baltimore Ravens by a score of 31–29 after Bailey missed a last-second, 51-yard field goal. With 32 seconds left, Tony Romo completed a four-yard touchdown pass to Dez Bryant, but because the following two-point conversion failed, Bailey had to make an onside kick. Dallas recovered the kick, but Bailey's 51-yard field goal attempt sailed wide right with six seconds remaining.

During a Week 7 19–14 road victory over the Carolina Panthers, Bailey kicked 28 and 38-yard field goals within the final four minutes. During a Week 11 23–20 overtime victory over the Cleveland Browns, he made the game tying 32-yard field goal with two seconds left in regulation and the winning 38-yard field goal in overtime. Three weeks later against the Cincinnati Bengals, the Cowboys were trailing 19–10 with 6:35 left but made a fourth quarter comeback, which consisted of a touchdown pass by Romo and a last-second 40-yard field goal by Bailey and the Cowboys narrowly won on the road by a score of 20–19. In the next game against the Pittsburgh Steelers, Bailey hit a game-winning 21-yard field goal following a 36-yard interception return by Brandon Carr. The 27–24 overtime victory kept the Cowboys' postseason hopes alive.

Bailey finished his second professional season converting all 37 extra point attempts and 29 of 31 field goal attempts.

==== 2013 season ====
In 2013, Bailey set the franchise record for most field goals over 50 yards for a single season (6) and a career (11). He finished the season converting all 47 extra point attempts and 28 of 30 field goal attempts.

==== 2014 season ====
On January 23, 2014, Bailey and the Cowboys agreed on a new seven-year contract, which was reported to be worth $22.5 million with a $4 million signing bonus and a total of $6.6 million in guaranteed money.

During a Week 3 34–31 road victory over the St. Louis Rams, Bailey set a franchise record with his 28th consecutive field goal, making a 40-yard attempt in the third quarter. Two weeks later, Bailey missed a potential game-winning 53-yard field goal against the Houston Texans at the end of regulation, breaking a franchise record streak of 30 consecutive makes dating back to the previous season. However, Bailey kicked the game-winning 49-yard field goal in overtime giving the Cowboys a 20–17 victory. In the next game against the Seattle Seahawks, he became the most-accurate kicker in NFL history with a 42-yard made field goal in the second quarter of the eventual 30–23 road victory. Bailey has since dropped to 12th on the all-time list, on which the top six players are all currently active.

Bailey finished the 2014 season converting all 56 extra point attempts and 25 of 29 field goal attempts.

==== 2015 season ====
Bailey moved into second place in franchise history with 182 career extra points, passing Mike Clark after making three in the narrow season-opening 27–26 victory over the New York Giants.

During a Week 13 19–16 road victory over the Redskins on Monday Night Football, Bailey made four of four field goals, including a game-winning 54-yard field goal. This performance earned him his second NFC Special Teams Player of the Week award.

Bailey was selected to his first career Pro Bowl after making a career-high 93.8% of his field goal attempts, including being perfect (19-for-19) from 39-yards or closer. After the NFL decided to move back the extra point distance from the two-yard line to the 15-yard line, Bailey responded by making a perfect mark of 25-of-25.

==== 2016 season ====
During the narrow season-opening 20–19 loss to the Giants, Bailey made four field goals and connected on field goals of 54 and 56-yards. During a Week 6 30–16 road victory over the Green Bay Packers, he made three field goals, marking his 23rd career game with three or more field goals made, which is the most in team history. During a Week 15 26–20 victory over the Tampa Bay Buccaneers, Bailey kicked six field goals, making four and missing two. These misses marked the second occasion of his career that he had missed two attempts in a game; the previous occasion had been in 2011.

Bailey finished the 2016 converting all 16 extra point attempts and 27 of 32 field goal attempts.

==== 2017 season ====
Bailey recorded his 28th career game of three or more made field goals by converting all four attempts during the season-opening 19–3 victory over the Giants on NBC Sunday Night Football. In the next game against the Denver Broncos, he tied his career long with a 56-yard field goal during the 42–17 road loss. The following week against the Cardinals marked just the 10th game in Bailey's career in which he did not attempt a field goal. During a Week 7 40–10 road victory over the 49ers, Bailey suffered a groin injury.

Bailey returned in time for the Thanksgiving game against the Los Angeles Chargers but would struggle in the following weeks. During a Week 14 30–10 road victory over the Giants, he missed two field goals and an extra point. Two weeks later against the Seahawks, in a game the Cowboys needed to win to keep their playoff aspirations alive, Bailey made a 51-yard field goal after hitting the left upright and missed two additional field goals, which could have helped the team stay closer in an ultimately season-ending 21–12 loss. In the regular-season finale against the Philadelphia Eagles, Bailey missed an extra point and a field goal during the 6–0 shutout road victory.

Before his injury, Bailey had been the most accurate kicker in NFL history among players with at least 100 attempts, but fell behind Justin Tucker. Bailey converted 15-of-20 field goals (75%) and 26-of-28 extra point attempts (92.9%) during the season.

==== 2018 season ====
Although Bailey was coming off his worst season, his September 1 release by the Cowboys was nonetheless considered a surprise move, after the team decided to keep Canadian Football League journeyman Brett Maher, who had a solid preseason (including a 57-yard field goal) yet had never kicked in an NFL regular-season game. Bailey had made his only attempt in the preseason (a 35-yard field goal).

The team saved $3.4 million against the salary cap with the move. Bailey left the Cowboys as the second-most-accurate kicker in NFL history (88.2%). He also holds the Cowboys' record for most consecutive extra points made (275), most consecutive field goals made (30) and career field goals (186).

=== Minnesota Vikings ===
==== 2018 season ====
On September 17, 2018, the Minnesota Vikings signed Bailey to replace rookie Daniel Carlson after Carlson missed three field goals during Week 2 against the Green Bay Packers. Bailey would go on to have another poor season, converting just 21 of 28 field goal attempts (75%), including only five of 11 attempts (45.4%) from 40 yards or more – this reduced productivity matched the previous year, as his percentage of overall field goals made was exactly the same.

==== 2019 season ====
On March 19, 2019, Bailey re-signed with the Vikings. He struggled during the preseason, forcing the Vikings to trade a fifth-round draft pick to the Baltimore Ravens in exchange for kicker Kaare Vedvik. Bailey would end up winning the kicking competition and Vedvik was released on August 31.

During a Week 5 28–10 road victory over the Giants, Bailey converted all four field goals and both extra points, earning NFC Special Teams Player of the Week honors. Three weeks later against the Redskins, he made four field goals and an extra point in the 19–9 victory en route to another NFC Special Teams Player of the Week award. During a Week 15 39–10 road victory over the Chargers, Bailey converted all four field goal attempts and three of four extra point attempts. He earned NFC Special Teams Player of the Week for the third time for his performance.

Bailey had a rebound season, re-establishing himself as a notable placekicker, converting 27 of 29 field goals (93.1%), although he had a career-low average in extra points, making 40 of 44 attempts (90.9%).

==== 2020 season ====
On March 23, 2020, Bailey re-signed with the Vikings on a three-year, $10 million contract. However, he struggled mightily during the season, going just 15 of 22 on field goals for a career low 68.1%, and just 37 of 43 on extra points for a career low 86%. Bailey was better hitting field goals inside 40 yards, making nine of 10 attempts (90%).

Bailey was released on March 9, 2021.

== NFL career statistics ==
Legend
	Led the league
**Bold**	Career high

=== Regular season ===
Year	Team	GP	Field goals									Extra points			Points
Year	Team	GP	FGM	FGA	FG%	<20	20−29	30−39	40−49	50+	Lng	XPM	XPA	XP%	Points
2011	DAL	**16**	**32**	**37**	86.5	1–1	8–9	11–11	10–12	2–4	51	39	39	**100.0**	**135**
2012	DAL	**16**	29	31	93.5	1–1	5–5	**13–13**	7–7	3–5	51	37	37	**100.0**	124
2013	DAL	**16**	28	30	93.3	**2–2**	2–2	8–9	**10–10**	**6–7**	53	47	47	**100.0**	131
2014	DAL	**16**	25	29	86.2	0–0	6–6	6–7	8–9	5–7	**56**	**56**	**56**	**100.0**	131
2015	DAL	**16**	30	32	**93.8**	0–0	9–9	10–10	6–7	5–6	54	25	25	**100.0**	115
2016	DAL	**16**	27	32	84.4	0–0	9–9	8–8	7–9	3–6	**56**	46	46	**100.0**	127
2017	DAL	12	15	20	75.0	1–1	3–4	4–5	4–5	3–5	**56**	26	28	92.9	71
2018	MIN	14	21	28	75.0	0–0	5–6	11–11	4–9	1–2	52	30	31	97.7	93
2019	MIN	**16**	27	29	93.1	0–0	**10–10**	9–9	5–7	3–3	53	40	44	90.9	121
2020	MIN	**16**	15	22	68.2	0–0	6–6	3–4	4–7	2–5	50	37	43	86.0	82
Career		154	249	290	85.9	5–5	57–60	80–83	61–75	31–45	56	383	396	96.7	1,130

=== Postseason ===
Year	Team	GP	Field goals									Extra points			Points
Year	Team	GP	FGM	FGA	FG%	<20	20−29	30−39	40−49	50+	Lng	XPM	XPA	XP%	Points
2014	DAL	**2**	1	**3**	33.3	0–0	0–0	0–0	0–1	1–2	51	**6**	**6**	**100.0**	9
2016	DAL	1	**3**	**3**	**100.0**	0–0	0–0	**1–1**	0–0	**2–2**	**52**	2	2	**100.0**	11
2019	MIN	**2**	**3**	**3**	**100.0**	0–0	**1–1**	**1–1**	**1–1**	0–0	43	3	3	**100.0**	**12**
Career		5	7	9	77.8	0–0	1–1	2–2	1–2	3–4	52	11	11	100.0	32

== See also ==
- List of NCAA major college football yearly scoring leaders
