= Cave Springs Public Schools =

School district in Oklahoma

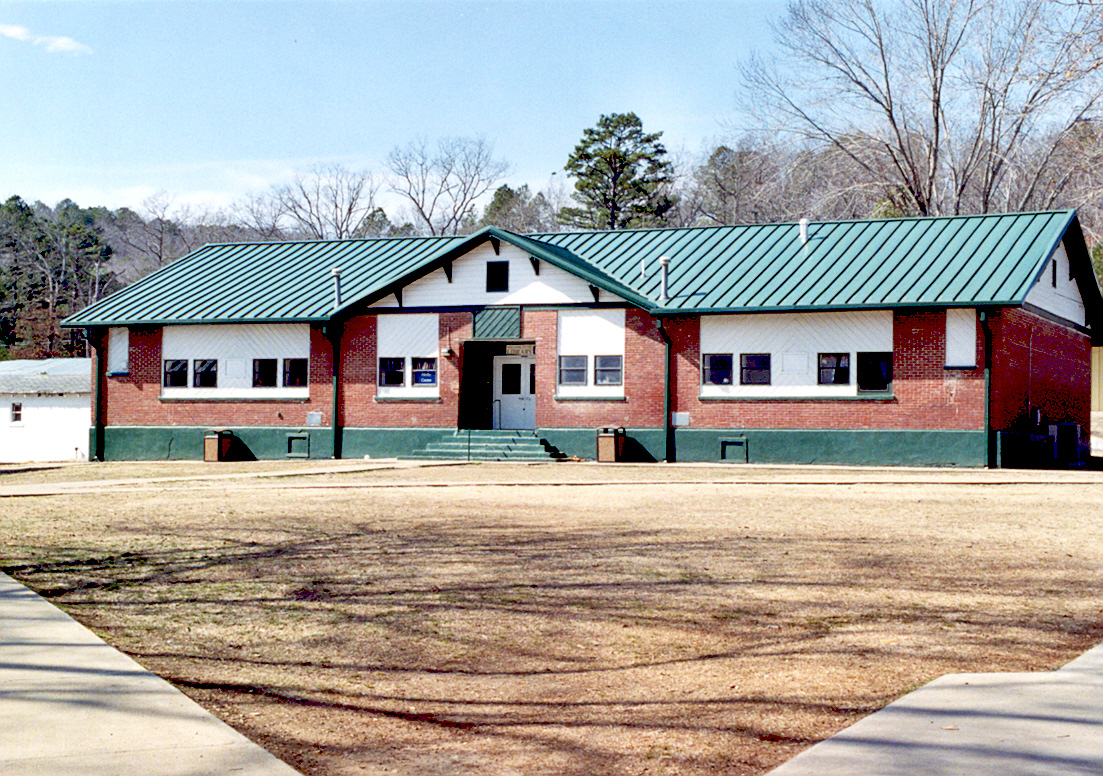

Location
- Bunch, Oklahoma United States
- Coordinates: 35°43′4″N 94°45′7″W

District information
- Grades: K–12
- Established: 1926; 99 years ago
- Superintendent: C. D. Thompson
- Enrollment: 216 (2006–2007)

Other information
- Principal-HS: Ashley Miller
- Website: www.cavesprings.k12.ok.us

Cave Springs Public Schools is a K–12 school district in rural, southwestern Adair County, Oklahoma. It was founded in 1926 by the consolidation of 3 K-8 schools and was originally named Union Grade School, often abbreviated as UG. In the late 1940s, the school's name was changed to Cave Springs, the mascot was changed from the Indians to the Hornets and the colors from red and white to green and white. Cave Springs is 2 1/2 miles north of Bunch, Oklahoma. The photograph at right is of the library, the oldest building on campus.

For the 2006–2007 school year, the Cave Springs School District had 216 students enrolled—99 elementary students and 117 high school students. Per the 2005 School Report Card issued by the Education Oversight Board, the high school had 12 teachers teaching a student body consisting of 88% American Indian and 12% White with a graduation rate of 88.2%. The elementary school had 10 teachers. The elementary students were 93% American Indian and 7% White, with 42.4% in special education.

== See also ==
- Cave Springs High School
