= Dove Schools =

Public charter school district in Oklahoma, US

Coordinates: 36.15576°N 95.88730°W

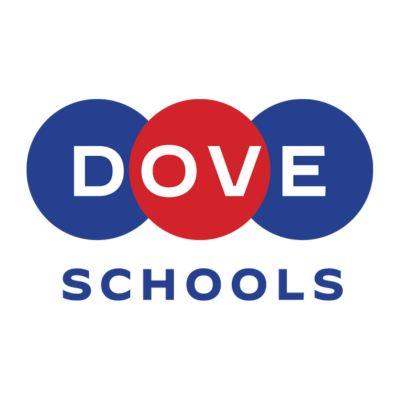

Location
- 5601 Northwest Expressway Warr Acres, Oklahoma; United States

District information
- Type: Public charter school district
- Motto: For a brighter future
- Grades: PK–12
- Established: 2000
- President: Ibrahim Sel
- Superintendent: Abidin Erez
- Deputy superintendent(s): Kanuni David Yilmaz; Marc Julian
- Schools: 9

Students and staff
- Enrollment: 3,765 (2024)
- Student–teacher ratio: 13:1
- District mascot: Raptors (Tulsa); Rockets (OKC)
- Colors: Dove Blue, Dove Red

Other information
- Locations Served: Oklahoma City, Tulsa
- Website: Dove Schools

Dove Schools is a college-preparatory public charter school district in Oklahoma. Founded in 2000 as a single middle school serving 218 students in grades 6–8, the district has since expanded to nine campuses across Oklahoma City and Tulsa, serving nearly 4,000 students in grades PreK–12.

== History ==
Dove Schools began as a middle school in the year 2000, with an emphasis on STEM education, accelerated coursework, and college preparatory programming. In 2001, the district launched its first High School in Oklahoma City, and over the years, the district expanded to include multiple elementary, middle, and high school campuses in the OKC and Tulsa areas, along with a virtual academy.

== Academics and recognitions ==
Dove Schools offers a college-preparatory curriculum with an emphasis on STEM education, including mathematics, science, and engineering. The district follows an accelerated model in which many students complete high school credit requirements by the 11th grade and continue with college-level coursework during their senior year. Dove Science Academy campuses participate in a variety of competitions, including MathCounts, Science Olympiad, FIRST LEGO League, FIRST Tech Challenge, and robotics competitions.

In statewide rankings, Dove Science Academy High School OKC has been recognized as one of the top high schools in Oklahoma. U.S. News & World Report ranked the campus among the best high schools in the state, placing it within the top three in Oklahoma for college readiness and overall academic performance. Local news outlets, including The Oklahoman, have highlighted the school's performance and college-preparatory achievements. Dove Schools campuses have also received recognition for character education. Dove Science Academy South OKC earned Honorable Mention as a School of Character from Oklahoma Schools of Character in 2020.

The district has received federal grant funding to support its STEM programs and college-preparatory initiatives. U.S. Department of Education documentation details awards and project funding for the district, supporting curriculum expansion, technology integration, and extracurricular STEM competitions. Third-party school review websites, including Niche.com, list Dove Science Academy among the top charter schools in Oklahoma for academics, student engagement, and STEM focus.

Additionally, the district has hosted events attended by U.S. government officials, such as a visit from the U.S. Secretary of Education, Linda McMahon, in 2025, highlighting the campus's STEM programs and student achievements.

== Controversies and investigations ==
In 2012–2014, a state audit found that the non-profit managing Dove Schools (the Sky Foundation) collected millions in lease payments exceeding the purchase value of school properties, violating charter and state regulations. In 2020, the Oklahoma State Department of Education alleged that Dove officials accessed confidential student records for over 100,000 students not enrolled in Dove Schools to send recruitment mailers. The matter was referred to the Oklahoma State Bureau of Investigation. The district was involved in litigation concerning operations and compliance, including probationary accreditation status for several campuses.

Dove Schools is considered a part of the Gülen/Hizmet movement based on organizational affiliations, participation in cultural events, staffing demographics, and operational patterns similar to other U.S.-based Gülen-affiliated charter networks. The district maintains a secular STEM-focused curriculum, but these ties have been noted by students, alumni, and staff. Dove Schools employs the largest concentration of Turkish staff in the State of Oklahoma, often hiring H-1B workers from Turkey across the district. Dove Schools is also a sister school of Harmony Public Schools in Texas.

== Schools ==
=== High schools ===
- Dove Science Academy High School OKC
- Dove Science Academy Middle/High School South OKC
- Dove Science Academy High School Tulsa

=== Middle schools ===
- Dove Science Academy Middle School OKC
- Dove Science Academy Middle School Tulsa

=== Elementary schools ===
- Dove School of Discovery
- Dove Science Academy Elementary OKC
- Dove Science Academy Elementary OKC South

=== Virtual schools ===
- Dove Virtual Academy
