= The Threat from the Sea =

The Threat From the Sea is a series of fantasy novels written mostly by Mel Odom. It contains three novels: Rising Tide, Under Fallen Stars, and The Sea Devil's Eye. It also contains the anthology book, Realms of the Deep.

== Publication history ==
The Threat from the Sea was written by Mel Odom, and consists of the novels Rising Tide, Under Fallen Stars and The Sea Devil's Eye. The series was later released in April 2009 as a trade paperback.

== Plot synopsis ==
The series tells the tale of the world beneath the oceans rising up to attack the surface world. It follows the adventures of Jherek Wolf's-Get, Pacys the bard, Sabyna the wizard, and Laqueel the malenti as they try to find their place in the world during this time of crisis. The series takes place between the Forgotten Realms years of 1354, the Year of the Bow and 1369, the Year of the Gauntlet.

== Background ==
Author Mel Odom intended the Threat from the Sea trilogy to have major implications for the Forgotten Realms setting: "Basically, an evil that has been buried for thousands of years has risen from the sea and turned against the surface world. A lot happens in these books, and the map of Toril will not be the same afterward. A lot of people are going to be shocked and amazed." Dungeons & Dragons game sourcebook tie-ins were planned to coincide with the novels, allowing players to follow the events of the trilogy in their own campaigns.

Rising Tide was released exactly eleven years since Odom's first book sale.

== Works included ==
1. Rising Tide (1999)
2. Under Fallen Stars (1999)
3. The Sea Devil's Eye (2000)
4. Realms of the Deep (2000)
