= Oklahoma City Community College =

College in Oklahoma City, Oklahoma, U.S.

Coordinates: 35°23′15″N 97°34′12″W

- Motto: Homines Amicitia Civitas (Latin) or "Man, Friendship, and Community"
- Type: Public community college
- Established: 1972 (as South Oklahoma City Junior College)
- Accreditation: Higher Learning Commission
- President: Mautra Staley Jones
- Students: 11,469 (fall 2023)
- Location: Oklahoma City, Oklahoma, United States
- Campus: Urban 143 acres (58 ha)
- Colors: Pure White; Rosewood Red; Pure Black; Camel; Foundation Black; Davys Grey
- Website: www.occc.edu

Oklahoma City Community College (OCCC) is a public community college in Oklahoma City, Oklahoma. The college was founded in 1972 as South Oklahoma City Junior College. In 2023, OCCC had an enrollment of 11,469 students and was the second largest community college and the fifth largest public higher education institution in Oklahoma. OCCC operates a main campus and three satellite locations in the south metro. A large percentage of OCCC students join or rejoin the local workforce each year. Their added skills translate to earnings of more than $220 million in annual additional income to Oklahoma's economy.

OCCC is accredited by The Higher Learning Commission. The short name of the college, OCCC, is most often read as "O-Triple-C." (the previous short name was "OKCCC" or "O-K-Triple-C", until the "K" was dropped sometime in the late 2000s to early 2010s)

== History ==
=== 1968-1989 ===
In 1968, civic and political leaders in south Oklahoma City began talking about bringing a junior college to the area. The next year, a bill was introduced into the Oklahoma State Legislature to form a college district. On March 20, 1969, a committee of the South Oklahoma City Chamber of Commerce (known as the Greater Capitol Hill Chamber until 1970) was organized to circulate petitions asking the Oklahoma State Regents for Higher Education to take action to establish a junior college in the area. Shortly after, the district was formed and a board of trustees was appointed.

On Sept. 25, 1972, South Oklahoma City Junior College opened for classes with an enrollment of 1,049 students. A formal dedication followed on Oct. 8, 1972. Construction on the Main Building began in 1973, and the first graduation ceremony was held with five students, who had transferred to the school, receiving associate degrees.

In 1975, the school newspaper, The Pioneer, was first published.

The Career Learning Center and Math Center opened in 1978, and the first Arts Festival Oklahoma was celebrated in 1979.

During this time, the college's official emblem was depicted: the symbol for man joined into a community.

The 1980s saw the completion of the Arts and Humanities Building and the High Technology Building.

In 1983, the college's name was officially changed to Oklahoma City Community College, reflecting its purpose as a college for the entire Oklahoma City metro area community. That same year, nearly 400 students graduated with associate degrees.

In December 1985, OCCC marked the celebration of the 125,000th student to enroll in classes. Meanwhile, the Child Development Center, the College Union and the Physical Plant were undergoing construction efforts until 1987.

In 1988, construction began on the Aquatic Center, which would become the site of the 1989 U.S. Olympic Festival aquatic events.

=== 1990-2009 ===
The beginning of the 1990s marked the opening of the School of Nursing and the Health Technologies Center, along with the enclosure of the Aquatic Center.

The college entered into its first cooperative agreements with the University of Central Oklahoma in 1992, easing the transition for its students to the four-year university. In 1994, groundbreaking took place for the library. Two years later, the Keith Leftwich Memorial Library opened its doors with a formal dedication on Oct. 22, 1996. The library's distinctive clock tower is one of the most visible buildings on the main campus.

The college's first online course was offered in 1997. In 1998, the college received a $500,000 economic development grant from the Oklahoma State Regents for Higher Education targeting advancements in the manufacturing and biotechnology fields.

By 1999, the median age of students was 26, and more than 56 percent of students were women. Approximately 25 percent of the student body belonged to a minority group. And, about 66 percent of the nearly 10,000 students attended classes part-time.

In 2007, OCCC began a large expansion adding three new buildings as well as expanding campus program offerings. The Robert P. Todd Science, Engineering and Math Center was a $10 million expansion to the main campus building and was named for the late OCCC president. The 65,500-square-foot facility provided new classrooms and labs. It includes a botany classroom and greenhouse for a biotechnology program.

The Health Professions Education Center, a multimillion-dollar facility housing the Division of Health Professions, was formally dedicated in 2008. The division features a simulated hospital area and one of only two Human Patient Simulators in the state. The facility houses academic degree and certificate programs in emergency medical sciences, registered nursing, occupational therapy and physical therapy.

=== 2010-Present ===
In 2011, OCCC dedicated the Family and Community Education (FACE) center at the former John Glenn Elementary School, which houses the Child Development Center and Lab School (CDCLS) as well as adult basic education courses including GED (or High School Equivalency, HSE) and ESL. On August 15, 2011, the college established the Oklahoma City Community College Police Department. As of August 2011, all Oklahoma City Community College campuses became smoke-free.

The 50,000-square-foot Visual and Performing Arts Center added classrooms, labs and studios for art instruction, music, photography and visual arts. The building features a renowned Digital Cinema Production program with the largest collection of AVID picture and sound editing machines in the Midwest. This two-phase project was later concluded with the addition of the Visual and Performing Arts Center Theater that opened in 2014. The theater has 1,049 seats and is host to national and local performances and events. Outside the theater in the Women of the South Plaza are two prominent metallic sculptures, "Crescendo" and "Ascending", created by Oklahoma City-based sculptor and OCCC alumnus Collin Rosebrook.

The renovation of the Capitol Hill Center began in July 2014 at the location of two historic buildings, previously Katz Drug Co. and Langston's Western Wear. The OCCC Capitol Hill Center is part of the economic development and revitalization of Oklahoma City's historic Capitol Hill District. The college serves the adult education and job readiness needs of the community's English, Spanish, and Korean-speaking community members. The Capitol Hill District became part of America's Main Street Program in 1997, overseen by The Capitol Hill Main Street/Calle Dos Cincos organization.

In 2015 following a continued decline in funding, Oklahoma City Community College closed its Aquatics Center and indefinitely suspended its annual Arts Festival Oklahoma event. The Aquatics Center formally closed following Labor Day weekend, which also saw the conclusion of the 37th Arts Festival Oklahoma event.

OCCC opened the student Veterans Lounge on May 16, 2016. The lounge is open to use for OCCC's veteran status students and features comfortable seating, study spaces, and a US flag that once flew over the United States Capitol, donated by the congressional office of Senator James Inhofe. Additionally, as part of its 2014 Title III grant award, the college completed renovation of its Student Advising area in October 2016.

In February 2017, the Childhood Development Center and Lab School met the Certified Healthy Oklahoma Program criteria to become a Certified Healthy Early Childhood Program. This designation recognizes early childhood program sites that make a positive impact on the health of employees and patrons.

The new Capitol Hill Center began accepting applications in summer 2017 for OCCC's Bilingual Banking and Finance Certificate of Mastery program, as well as began its non-credit classes in ESL, GED (For Spanish speakers), US Citizenship, Introduction to Technology for the Workforce, and Basic Computer Skills. The OCCC Capitol Hill Center was formally dedicated on August 18, 2017. In partnership with the Calle Dos Cinco group, OCCC hosted its first community open house at the August 25th Fiesta Friday street festival event.

In July 2014, Santa Fe South Schools, a public charter district serving south Oklahoma City, assumed operation of Santa Fe South Pathways Middle College, a high school located on OCCC's main campus in which students may concurrently earn an associate degree from OCCC alongside their high school diploma. In 2021, OCCC assumed the role of charter authorizer for Santa Fe South Schools, replacing Oklahoma City Public Schools and formalizing an expanded partnership between the two institutions.

In May 2020, the college announced a reduction in personnel as a result of state-wide budget deficits and a decrease in student enrollment.

=== Presidents ===
- J.C. Nichols (1970)
- John E. Cleek (1971-1974)
- Hugh Turner (1974)
- Dale L. Gibson (1974-1982)
- Donald L. Newport (1982-1987)
- Kenneth P. Walker (1988-1991)
- Bobby D. Gaines (1991-1995)
- Robert P. Todd (1995-2005)
- Paul W. Sechrist (2005-2015)
- Jerry L. Steward (2015–2020)
- Mautra Staley Jones (2022–present)

== Administration ==
The college staff consists of 357 positions as of the 2017 fall semester. Staff report to various administrative departmental directors who report to vice president and executive director members of the President's Cabinet. The college president reports to the Board of Regents. The Board of Regents is the governing board for Oklahoma City Community College. Members of the Board are appointed by the Governor of the State of Oklahoma for a seven-year term or as designated.

== Accreditation ==
OCCC is accredited by The Higher Learning Commission. This college is a member of the American Association of Community Colleges and is also recognized by the federal government to offer education under the veterans and social security laws.

== Academics ==
OCCC offers 25 Associate in Arts and Associate in Science degree programs, 19 Associate in Applied Science degree programs, and 21 Certificate of Mastery programs. In addition to its degree and certificate programs, OCCC offers a wide range of community and continuing education courses, workshops, conferences and seminars.

Courses are mostly taken on campus with average of 21:1 student-to-teacher ratio. Courses are also offered online. The faculty consists of 121 full-time professors, and 363 adjunct professors.

== Locations ==
The main campus of Oklahoma City Community College is located at 7777 South May Avenue in Oklahoma City.

The Family and Community Education (FACE) center campus is located at 6500 South Land Avenue, Oklahoma City, OK 73159.

The Professional Development Institute (PDI) facility is located at 7124 S I-35 Service Rd, Oklahoma City, OK 73149.

The Capitol Hill Center facility is located at 325 Southwest 25th Street in OKC's historic Capitol Hill district.
