= Idabel High School =

Coordinates: 33°52′55″N 94°48′56″W

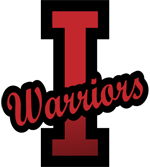

Location
- 901 Lincoln Road; Idabel, Oklahoma; United States

Information
- Type: Public high school
- School district: Idabel Public Schools
- Principal: Marlin Coffman
- Teaching staff: 25.61 (FTE)
- Grades: 9–12
- Enrollment: 425 (2023-2024)
- Student to teacher ratio: 16.60
- Colors: Red and black
- Mascot: Warrior
- Website: www.idabelps.org/o/high-school

Idabel High School is high school located in Idabel, Oklahoma, which is in McCurtain County in the southeastern corner of the state. It is a part of Idabel Public Schools.

== Curriculum and academics ==
Oklahoma state law requires all public schools to offer courses to teach the necessary basic skills of learning and communication (reading, English, writing, the use of numbers and science) and social studies (United States Constitution and government, Oklahoma history and government and a course on other countries of the world).

Additionally, high schools must provide a physical education course designed to provide a minimum of 150 minutes of physical education per week, unless provided an exemption by the Oklahoma State Department of Education due to undue hardship.

Due to agriculture's importance in Oklahoma, Idabel High School, like many Oklahoma schools offers agriculture education.

Idabel High School received a B grade under the state's new A-F grading system in 2012. The overall district received a C.

According to Publicschoolreview.com, the high school has a graduation rate of 81 percent.

== Sports and traditions ==
The school track teams have won a total of 22 state championships, with the boys team winning 17 and the girls team winning 5. Most recently, the boys team won the 1995 state championship. The girls most recent win was in 2006.

The boys basketball team took home the state championship in 2005.

Idabel students have also earned recognition in golf. Lacey Jones won the women's 4A state championships in 2001–2004.

Zac Myers won the boys 4A golf state championship in 2010.

Madelyn Lehr won the Girls 3A golf state championship in 2012. The Team took state runner up honors.

Nick Stauter won the Boys 3A golf state championship in 2012.

Ali White won the Girls 3A state championship in 2013 and 2014.

== See also ==
- List of high schools in Oklahoma
