= Cave Springs High School =

High school in Oklahoma, United States

Coordinates: 35°43′4″N 94°45′7″W

Location
- 89660 South 4637 Road; Bunch, (Adair County), Oklahoma 74931; United States

Information
- Type: Public high school
- Principal: Ashley Miller
- Staff: 6.93 (FTE)
- Enrollment: 110 (2023-2024)
- Student to teacher ratio: 15.87
- Colors: Green and black
- Nickname: Hornets
- Website: www.cavesprings.k12.ok.us/page/high-school

Cave Springs High School is an American high school for grades 9–12 in Bunch, Adair County, Oklahoma. In 2006 it had an enrollment of 129. It is the only high school in the Cave Springs School District.
