= Harding Charter Preparatory High School =

Charter school in Oklahoma, US

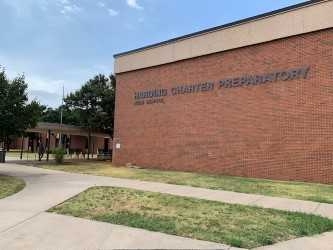

Location
- 1301 NE 101st Street; Oklahoma City, Oklahoma 73131; United States

Information
- Type: Charter school
- Opened: 2003
- School district: Harding Independence Charter District
- Superintendent: Steven Stefanick
- Principal: Joe Hughes
- Teaching staff: 30.00 (FTE)
- Grades: 9–12
- Enrollment: 573 (2023-2024)
- Student to teacher ratio: 19.10
- Campus type: Suburban
- Color: Green
- Team name: Eagles
- Website: www.hardingcharterprep.org

Harding Charter Preparatory High School is an open-access public charter high school in Oklahoma City, Oklahoma. It was founded in 2003 and is sponsored by the Oklahoma City Public Schools system, offering a free public college-preparatory education. The school's expectation is that after graduation every student will not only enter college but earn a four-year degree, either directly out of high school or after enlisting in the military.

== Admissions and demographics ==
Harding is non-selective and does not have entry tests or interviews, but in March 2012, application numbers required a lottery to be instituted for the available places. The school reflects the diversity of the Oklahoma City metropolitan area; in 2013 people of color constituted 58% of enrollment, 48% were economically disadvantaged, and two thirds of its graduates were first-generation college students.

== Curriculum ==
Harding has a rigorous academic curriculum based on a 4x4 (four years of math, science, English, and social studies) plan featuring required Advanced Placement courses, two years of foreign language or computer science, and fine arts.

== Rankings ==
HCP became a National Blue Ribbon School in 2013. In 2013 and 2016 the Washington Post ranked it as the most challenging high school in the state, and in 2014 U.S. News & World Report ranked it as the best high school in the state. In 2016 the school received an A+ grade from the state Department of Education for the fourth consecutive year.

== Relocation ==
Beginning in the 2019–2020 school year, Harding Charter Preparatory High School was relocated to the former Oklahoma Centennial High School building, located at 1301 NE 101st St., due to the closure and sale of the historic building at 3333 N Shartel to Harding Fine Arts Academy by the OKCPS "Pathway to Greatness" project.
