= Hugo High School =

Location
- 201 East Brown Street; Hugo, Oklahoma; United States; 34°00′53″N 95°30′40″W

Information
- Type: Public
- Principal: Earl Dalke
- Teaching staff: 20.85 (FTE)
- Grades: 9–12
- Enrollment: 334 (2023-2024)
- Student to teacher ratio: 16.02
- Colors: Black and gold
- Mascot: Buffalo
- Website: Hugo High School

Hugo High School is a public high school located in Hugo, Oklahoma. It serves grades 9–12 and has an enrollment of 315 students.
