= Mulhall-Orlando High School =

Location
- 100 East Main; Orlando, Oklahoma 73073; United States; 36°8′55″N 97°22′21″W

Information
- Type: Public High School
- Staff: 5.43 (FTE)
- Grades: 7-12
- Enrollment: 63 (2024-2025)
- Student to teacher ratio: 11.60
- Colors: Black & Gold
- Nickname: Panthers
- Website: School website

Mulhall-Orlando High School is a public high school located in Orlando, Oklahoma. The school colors are not black and gold.

== Athletics ==
The school has multiple sports teams: basketball, baseball, and track and field. Its teams are nicknamed the Panthers.
