= College preparatory course =

Course to prepare high-school students for college

A college preparatory course is a means by which college bound high school students may better meet the more stringent scholastic requirements for entry into colleges and universities. Students taking college-preparatory courses may have an increased quantity of classwork, and expectations to achieve are at a higher level. The GPA weight for college-preparatory courses may have more value for college entry programs than regular courses. College prep courses are particularly appropriate for providing the academic background needed to succeed in a degree program at a college or university. Above college-preparatory in difficulty is honors, where the advanced structure while similar in many ways to college prep, requires even more effort from the student. In many schools, a student can move from college-preparatory courses to Advanced Placement courses, if they attain a certain average.

== See also ==
- Education in the United States
