= Porter Consolidated High School =

Coordinates: 35°52′10″N 95°31′20″W

Location
- 125 South Main; Porter, Oklahoma; United States

Information
- Type: Public Secondary
- Principal: Jentri Guinn
- Teaching staff: 10.99 (FTE)
- Grades: 9–12
- Enrollment: 158 (2023-2024)
- Student to teacher ratio: 14.38
- Colors: White and blue
- Mascot: Pirate

Porter Consolidated High School is a high school in Wagoner County in Porter, Oklahoma.
