= Oklahoma Union Public Schools =

High School

Coordinates: 36°55′02″N 95°37′50″W

Oklahoma Union High School is a public high school located between South Coffeyville, Oklahoma and Lenapah, Oklahoma. The school was established in 1990. It was founded with the purpose of combining three small-school districts into one. The school mascot is the Cougar.

The three school districts in the area were Wann, Lenapah, and Delaware. They were small-town districts and the State of Oklahoma did not wish to fund them, nor did Nowata County. So in 1990, two of the three schools agreed to consolidate. Wann and Lenapah successfully combined while Delaware chose not to. After a few years, Delaware parents wished to move their children to Oklahoma Union. After about five years of Union's establishment, Delaware Public Schools officially closed and merged with Oklahoma Union Public Schools.

== Beat of the Cougars ==
The Beat of the Cougars is the nickname of one of the most successful organizations at the high school and its growing success is finally gaining peoples attention. In the 2012–13 school year, the band went to state competition for concert band. In 2013–14, they reorganized the marching band and had a successful first year receiving a best in class trophy and best overall drumline award. The next year they took their show to the next level and competed in the regional marching competition where they got a superior rating and then barely missed state with a 1 2 2 at district contest for concert band. In 2015 they took their show "The Epic Battle" to OBA (state competition) in Moore, Oklahoma and then also went to the regional marching competition in Skiatook where they got a superior rating for the second year in a row. On the other side of band they also go to every football game as a pep band and support the team while entertaining the audience and they go to every home basketball game. Many say the band makes OKU's home basketball games the best out of any school around, whether that's true is up to you so come out and see for yourself.

== Cougar sports ==
As of today, Oklahoma Union is classified as a 2A school, and the school has not had very much athletic success other than the 1997 2A Girls State Championship. The coach of that championship squad was David Lampton, who continues to coach at the school today. In 2004, the Cougars football team went all the way to Class A State Regional. In 2012, the Lady Cougar Volleyball team made it to the 4a State Tournament, but lost in the first round. 2 years later the Lady Cougar Volleyball team returned to the 3a State Tournament in 2014 and lost in the first round. In 2015 the Lady Cougar Volleyball team made it to the 3a State Tournament. The Lady Cougars beat Okay in the quarterfinals to advance to the Semi-finals where they defeated Salina in a tough game to advance to the State Championship and lost to Community Christian in the championship. The Lady Cougars are the 2015 3a Volleyball State Runners-up. The sports program at the school includes football, boys and girls basketball, baseball, fast-pitch softball, track, and girls volleyball. The school has discontinued golf and wrestling programs.

=== Sports rivalries ===
Oklahoma Union and Nowata are rivals, with the most intense games played in basketball and baseball.

== State championships ==
- 1997 2A Girls Basketball
- 2021 2A Boys Basketball

== Oklahoma Union FFA ==
The Oklahoma Union FFA program is directed by Blake Collier and Kevin Stacy. It has won a number of State Championships and National Championships in many different CDE events.

== New activities center ==
In May 2009, the Nowata County Bond Issue passed, which allowed Oklahoma Union Public Schools construct a brand new activities center that will include a new gym, art room, agriculture room, and band room. The new gym will reportedly seat 2,500 and be air-conditioned.

== Note ==
Although the high school has a South Coffeyville address, South Coffeyville has its own public schools. Lenapah is the closest town to the OKU Pasture.
