= Pittsburg Public School =

Coordinates: 34.7144°N 95.8542°W

Pittsburg Public School is a high school located in Pittsburg, Oklahoma, U.S.. There are roughly 200 students.

The athletic sports include basketball and baseball/softball. There are also academic sports such as 4-h and quiz bowl available to students as well.

The classes mostly consist of main subjects, such as algebra I and II, biology, chemistry, history and other required classes for passing high school. French used to be available to the students, but the teacher has left. All foreign languages are now taken online. Driver's education is offered at the school for free, which takes up a class period for students.

Pittsburg has a semester based year. The classes are usually 45 minutes long and students have seven classes a day. Lunch is strictly on-campus, and is also 45 minutes long.

The school is located at .
