= Oklahoma Centennial High School =

Coordinates: 35°34′26″N 97°29′23″W

Oklahoma Centennial Middle/High School

Location
- 1301 NE 101st Street; Oklahoma City, Oklahoma; United States

Information
- Motto: Tantum eruditi sunt Liberi
- Status: Closed permanently
- Closed: June 30, 2019
- School district: Oklahoma City Public Schools
- Teaching staff: 21.66 (FTE)
- Grades: 7–12
- Enrollment: 326 (2018-19)
- Student to teacher ratio: 15.05
- Colors: Burgundy and gold
- Team name: Bison

Oklahoma Centennial Middle/High School was a grade 7–12 public education school in the Oklahoma City Public Schools district. In 2008, the school occupied its permanent building, located at 1301 NE 101st Street in Oklahoma City. On January 22, 2019, Oklahoma City Public Schools Superintendent Sean McDaniel announced that Centennial would be closed as a part of his "Path to Greatness" plan. The building where it was located is now occupied by Harding Charter Preparatory High School.

== History ==
OCHS began in 2007 as a grade 6–9 school and expanded to become a grade 6–12 school in 2008. It graduated its first senior class in 2008. It takes its name from the fact that 2007 was the centennial anniversary of Oklahoma's statehood. Beginning in 2011, sixth-grade students in the OCHS attendance area remained in the elementary schools. OCHS became a grade 7–12 school starting with the 2011–2012 school term.

Carol Thompson was the first principal of Centennial. She led the school its beginning in 2007 until the first quarter of the spring term in 2011. Assistant Principal Barbara Davis was appointed interim principal for the last quarter of 2011. Beginning in 2011, H. Charmaine Johnson was appointed as Oklahoma Centennial High School's principal. At the beginning of the Spring 2014 term, Michelle Pontikos replaced Johnson as the principal at OCHS. Tami Sanders became the principal at Centennial beginning in the 2015-2016 school term.

As part of the "Pathway to Greatness" program, OCHS was selected as one of the schools that was to close down permanently. It closed at the end of June in 2019, and Harding Charter Preparatory High School began to occupy its building instead.

== Closing ==
In 2019 it was announced that Centennial would be closed at the end of the 2019 school term as a part of the Oklahoma City Public School District's "Path to Greatness" reorganization plan implemented by district superintendent Dr. Sean McDaniel.

== Misc info ==
Oklahoma Centennial had a total student body of about 650 students at the time of closing.

The school's mascot was the Bison, the official state animal of Oklahoma. The school's colors were burgundy and gold.

The OCHS motto was Tantum eruditi sunt Liberi (Only the educated are free).

The school's alma mater was "Bisons Brave and Bold". It was written by Robert Lynn Green, a charter member of the OCHS faculty.

== Athletics ==
In 2011, Oklahoma Centennial won its first state sports champion when the Bison men's basketball team won the Oklahoma Secondary Scholastic Activities Association (OSSAA) 3A basketball trophy. In 2012, the Bison men's team repeated as champions. The Bison were state runners-up in 2013 in 3A men's basketball.

Audrianna Morgan has won twice, in 2011 and 2012, as the 3A state track champion in the 100 meter and 200 meter events.
