= Wilson High School (Oklahoma) =

High school in Oklahoma, United States

Coordinates: 34.166576°N 97.416158°W

Information
- Grades: 9-12
- Enrollment: 162 (2023–2024)

Wilson High School is a secondary school in Wilson, Oklahoma. It serves grades 9 through 12, and includes an alternative high school program.

The current building was built in 1978–79, replacing one built in 1917–18.

They teach history, Music, Math, English, Art, Physical Education. They have a football team called the "Wilson's Stinging Hornets" They play in the football season and have won 24 games and lost 72.
