= Academy of Classical Christian Studies =

The Academy of Classical Christian Studies

Location
- Oklahoma City, Oklahoma; United States
- 35°34′46″N 97°29′34″W

Information
- Type: Christian, Classical
- Motto: Love The True, The Good, The Beautiful
- Established: 2013
- NCES School ID: A2103047
- Headmaster: Nathan Carr
- Faculty: 66.5 FTEs
- Enrollment: 859 (plus 100 in PreK, as of 2023–24)
- Student to teacher ratio: 12.9:1
- Website: theacademyok.org

The Academy of Classical Christian Studies (often called The Academy or The Classical Academy) is a private classical Christian school located in Oklahoma City, Oklahoma, serving Pre-Kindergarten through twelfth grade.

The Academy was formed in 2013 as a merger between Providence Hall Classical Christian School and Veritas Classical Academy.

The Academy's statement of faith is rooted in the Nicene Creed.

The school's office is located at 1120 East Hefner Road in Oklahoma City. It has three locations throughout the metropolitan area (Midtown, North, and South) to serve all grades. The Academy offers Grammar education in both traditional (5-day) and blended (2-day) options. Dialectic education includes 3-day and 5-day options, and Rhetoric offers traditional 5-day learning. Nathan Carr is the headmaster, while Adam Mearse is the high school (Rhetoric) principal.

Academy of Classical Christian Studies is a member of the Society of Classical Learning. It is accredited by AdvanceEd.

As of the 2023–24 school year, the school had an enrollment of 859 students (plus 100 in PreK) and 66.5 classroom teachers (on an FTE basis), for a student–teacher ratio of 12.9:1.

== Athletics ==
After defeating Apache High School on a last-second basket by a score of 44–43 in a 2025 girls' basketball divisional championship game, the coach watched the game tape and realized that the team had been awarded the victory erroneously due to a scoring error that had given them two extra points. Even though the team was entitled to keep the title under league regulations, the players unanimously agreed to return the championship plaque to their opponents.
