= Southwest Covenant School =

Christian private school in Oklahoma, USA

Coordinates: 35.512107°N 97.723389°W

Information
- School type: Private school
- Religious affiliation: Christianity
- Established: 1982; 44 years ago
- Grades: Pre-Kindergarten - Grade 12
- Enrollment: c.560
- Accreditation: Christian Schools International
- Website: www.southwestcovenant.com

Southwest Covenant School is a Christian private school in Yukon, Oklahoma, United States, with approximately 560 students enrolled in Pre-K through 12th grade. The school was established in 1982 and is accredited by Christian Schools International (CSI).

== School history ==
Southwest Covenant School was founded in 1982 as a non-denominational Christian school, originally offering instruction to children in pre-school through sixth grade. In 1984 SWCS expanded through the eighth grade. In 1991, the school added grades 9–12, with the first senior class graduating in 1996. SWCS moved into a new secondary facility in 1996. Until then the school conducted classes for grades six through twelve at Trinity Baptist Church in Yukon and Putnam City Baptist Church in Warr Acres, until they built their own facility in the fall of 1996. In 2014 a ground-breaking was held for a new elementary school directly west of the secondary facility. The elementary was completed in 2016. A new high school building was also built, with its completion coming in 2023.

== Education ==
The school's educational philosophy is based on Biblical inerracy. Southwest Covenant School's aim is to teach and instill a Biblical world view in the students, while also providing them with the knowledge needed to succeed in life.

The average cumulative ACT scores for all SWCS graduates is 25.92. The great majority of SWCS graduates have attended or are currently attending institutions of higher learning.

== Athletics ==
Southwest Covenant currently participates in sports including football, basketball, baseball, volleyball, track and field, cross country, cheer, and powerlifting.

== Notable alumni ==
- Dan Bailey, current 2nd most accurate all-time NFL kicker
