= Byng High School =

Secondary school in Oklahoma, US

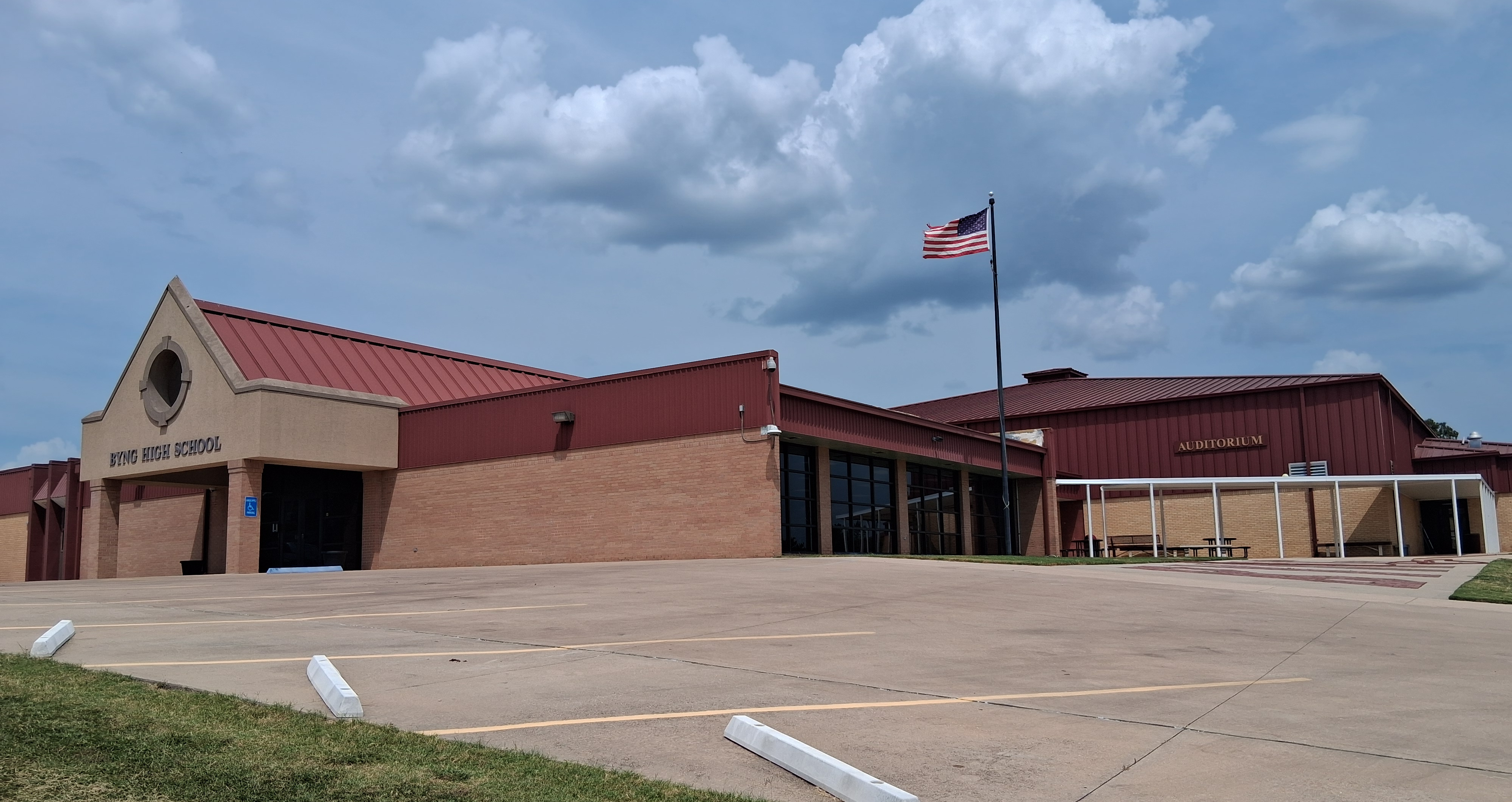
- Byng High School in 2026

Location
- 500 South New Bethel Boulevard; Byng, Oklahoma 74820; United States; 34.8607545°N 96.6642467°W

Information
- Type: Public secondary school
- Established: 1925
- School district: Byng Public Schools
- Principal: Jon Jamar
- Teaching staff: 24.77 (FTE)
- Grades: 10–12
- Enrollment: 289 (2023–2024)
- Student to teacher ratio: 11.67
- Colors: Maroon and gold
- Nickname: Pirates
- Website: bhs.byngschools.com

Byng High School is a public secondary school in Byng, Oklahoma, United States. It serves grades 10–12 for the Byng Public Schools. In April 2024, a proposed school bond was passed with voter approval of 75.54%. The bond, which valued $29 million, was for a new safe room, a band and weight room, improved agriculture classrooms, a new athletic field house (planned to include lockers, concessions, and restrooms), a refurbished track, and new tennis courts.

Another bond of $550,000 for newer school buses also passed with similar voter approval rates.

== Academics ==
This school offers a two-year Chickasaw language course.
