= Dove Science Academy - High School OKC =

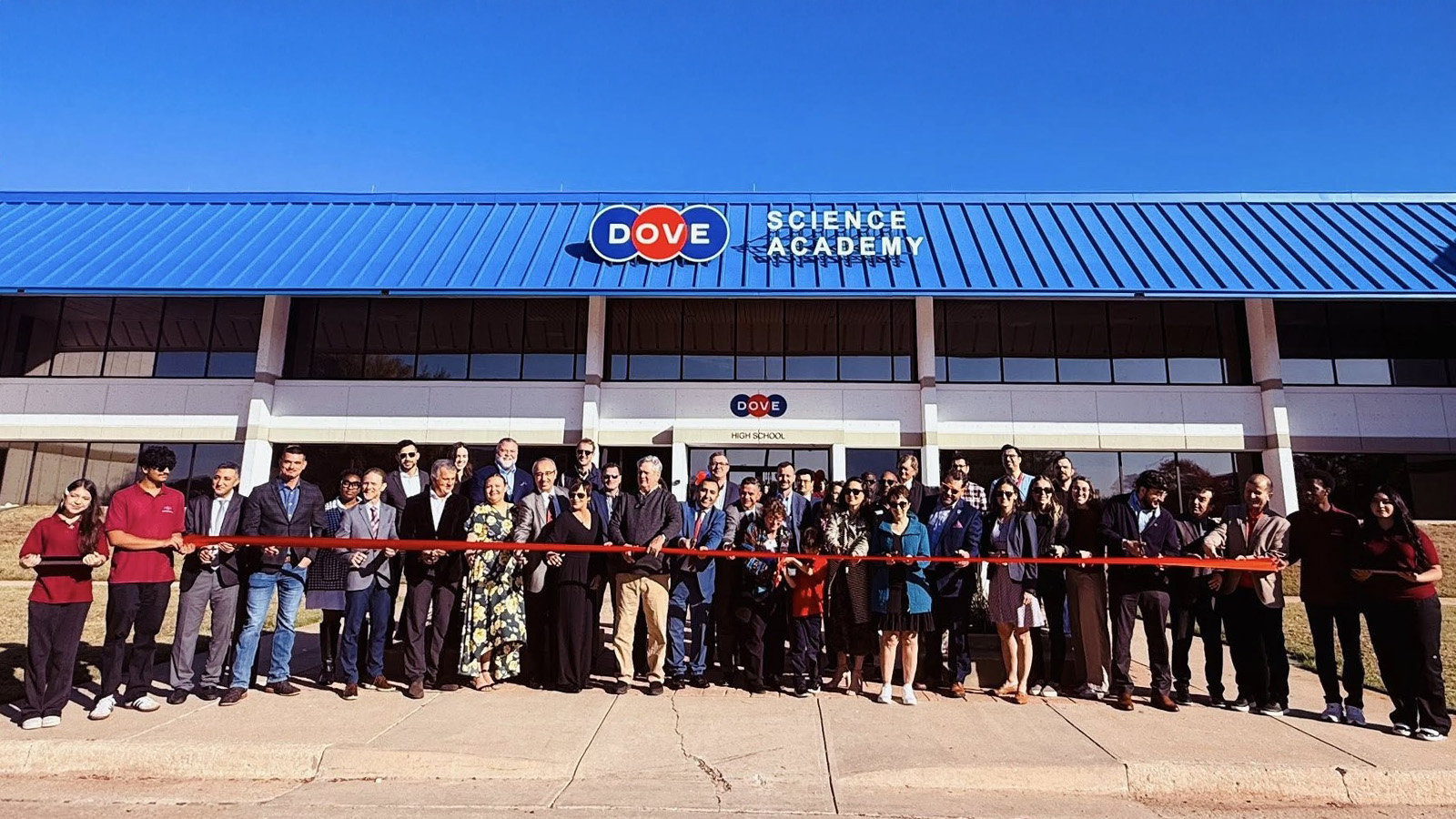

Location
- 5601 NW Expressway; Warr Acres, Oklahoma 73132; United States; 35.548064°N 97.613261°W

Information
- Type: Charter school
- Motto: For your brighter future
- Established: 2000
- Sister school: Harmony Public Schools
- School district: Dove Schools
- Superintendent: Abidin Erez
- CEEB code: 372652
- Principal: Muhammed Atay
- Grades: 8-12
- Enrollment: 506 (2025–2026)
- Campus: North Campus
- Campus type: Suburban
- Colors: Dove Blue, Dove Red
- Mascot: Rockets
- USNWR ranking: 245 (2026–2027)
- Website: www.dsaokc.org

Dove Science Academy High School OKC is a tuition-free public charter high school in Warr Acres, Oklahoma, a suburb of Oklahoma City. It is operated by Dove Schools and serves students in grades 8-12. The school offers a college-preparatory curriculum emphasizing STEM, with courses ranging from AP, engineering, computer science, fine arts, biomedicine, and concurrent enrollment.

== History ==
Dove Science Academy was founded in 2001 in Oklahoma City. The school originally served middle school students before expanding to include grades 9-12, according to the Oklahoma State Department of Education. The school was originally located at 919 NW 23rd Street in Oklahoma City. It expanded its academic offerings to include Advanced Placement and college-level coursework.

In January 2025, Dove Schools announced the purchase of a 21.5-acre property on Northwest Expressway in Warr Acres. The property had previously been occupied by Hertz as a data center. The high school moved to the Northwest Expressway campus at the beginning of the 2025-2026 school year. The campus also consists of Dove Public Charter School district offices, Dove Virtual Academy administrative offices, Dove Science Academy Middle School, and Dove Science Academy Elementary to the east. At the end of the 2025-2026 school year, they completed construction on their additional athletic facilities which include a gymnasium and soccer fields.

== Academics ==
Dove Science Academy's curriculum includes mathematics, science, engineering, and computer science, along with Advanced Placement, PLTW, and concurrent-enrollment courses. Extracurricular academic programs include robotics and competitions such as Science Olympiad, FIRST Lego League Challenge, FIRST Tech Challenge, VEX Robotics, MathCounts, and fine arts such as music, photography, visual arts, and literary arts.

In 2017, Dove Science Academy and Oklahoma State University–Oklahoma City established EXCELerate Dove, a concurrent-enrollment program allowing students to earn college credit while completing high school. The program provided a pathway toward an Associate in Science degree.

== Rankings and recognition ==
In 2014, Dove Science Academy ranked second among Oklahoma high schools in a statewide ranking published by US News & World Report.

In 2017, the school was designated a National Blue Ribbon School by the United States Department of Education.

In April 2025, Dove Schools received a $9.2 million federal grant through The Expanding Opportunity Through Quality Charter Schools Program (CSP).

In August 2025, U.S. Secretary of Education Linda McMahon and Oklahoma Governor Kevin Stitt visited the high school as part of the U.S. Department of Education's "Returning Education to the States Tour." The visit included a tour of the campus and observations of the school's academic programs.

In the 2026-27 U.S. News & World Report Best High Schools rankings, Dove Science Academy ranked first among high schools in Oklahoma, 55th in charter schools nationally, and 245th nationally.

== Athletics ==
Dove Schools did not originally operate interscholastic athletic programs, but the Oklahoma City schools later began fielding teams under the OSSAA. The school competes as the Rockets and fields teams in basketball, soccer, and volleyball.
