= Bunch, Oklahoma =

Unincorporated community in Oklahoma, US

Bunch
- Unincorporated community and Census designated place
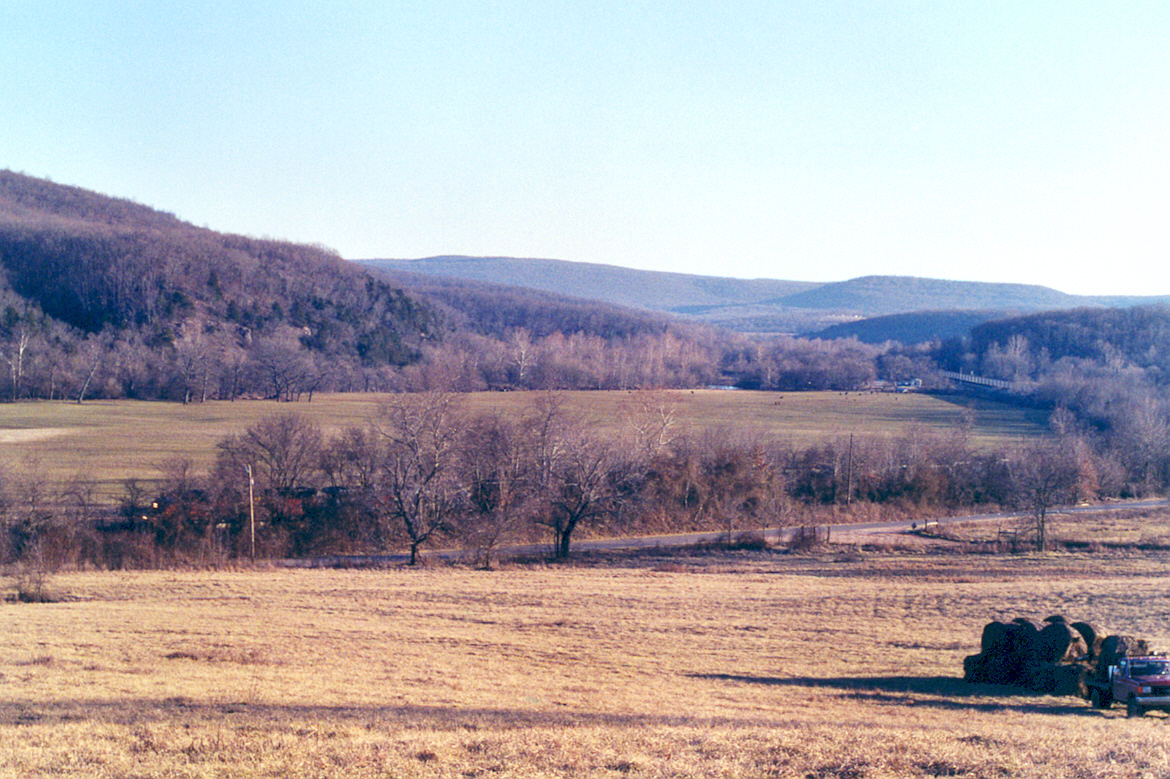
- Picture of Bunch almost hidden in the trees from about 1 mile north. There is a Kansas City Southern freight-train just across the road

- Location within the state of Oklahoma Bunch (the United States)
- Coordinates: 35°40′55″N 94°44′46″W
- Country: United States
- State: Oklahoma
- County: Adair

Area
  - Total: 15.39 sq mi (39.85 km^{2})
  - Land: 15.27 sq mi (39.55 km^{2})
  - Water: 0.11 sq mi (0.29 km^{2})
- Elevation: 1,024 ft (312 m)

Population (2020)
  - Total: 70
  - Density: 4.6/sq mi (1.77/km^{2})
- Time zone: UTC-6 (Central (CST))
  - Summer (DST): UTC-5 (CDT)
- ZIP codes: 74931
- FIPS code: 40-09900
- GNIS feature ID: 2805309

Bunch (Cherokee: ᏤᎩ) is an unincorporated community and Census designated place in southwestern Adair County, Oklahoma, United States. As of the 2020 census, Bunch had a population of 70. It was named after a Cherokee vice-chief named Rabbit Bunch who lived in the area in the 1880s. Nestled in the Sallisaw Creek valley, Bunch is bisected by what used to be the Kansas City Southern Railroad, now CPKC, which was built in the 1890s. Bunch is in the Cookson Hills area of eastern Oklahoma which are a part of the western area of the Ozark Mountains. The Cookson Hills Wildlife Management Area is west of the town. Two and one-half miles north of town is Cave Springs Public Schools, a K-12 school which serves Bunch and the surrounding area.

== Demographics ==
Historical population
Census	Pop.	Note	%±
2020	70		—
U.S. Decennial Census

=== 2020 census ===
As of the 2020 census, Bunch had a population of 70. The median age was 42.5 years. 28.6% of residents were under the age of 18 and 24.3% of residents were 65 years of age or older. For every 100 females there were 45.8 males, and for every 100 females age 18 and over there were 47.1 males age 18 and over.

0.0% of residents lived in urban areas, while 100.0% lived in rural areas.

There were 30 households in Bunch, of which 20.0% had children under the age of 18 living in them. Of all households, 43.3% were married-couple households, 33.3% were households with a male householder and no spouse or partner present, and 20.0% were households with a female householder and no spouse or partner present. About 26.7% of all households were made up of individuals and 10.0% had someone living alone who was 65 years of age or older.

There were 37 housing units, of which 18.9% were vacant. The homeowner vacancy rate was 0.0% and the rental vacancy rate was 0.0%.

Racial composition as of the 2020 census
Race	Number	Percent
White	32	45.7%
Black or African American	0	0.0%
American Indian and Alaska Native	32	45.7%
Asian	0	0.0%
Native Hawaiian and Other Pacific Islander	0	0.0%
Some other race	0	0.0%
Two or more races	6	8.6%
Hispanic or Latino (of any race)	1	1.4%

== Popular culture ==
Bunch is one of the prominent locales referenced in Elmore Leonard's crime novel "The Hot Kid", which takes place in the 1930s.
