= McAlester Christian Academy =

Location
- 1700 S Main St; McAlester, Oklahoma 74501; United States
- 34.921408°N 95.7728°W

Information
- Type: Private
- Religious affiliation: Christian
- Denomination: Non-denominational
- Established: 2006
- Principal: Paulette Higgins
- Faculty: 10
- Grades: K-12
- Enrollment: 54 (as of January 2009)
- Average class size: 3.6 students
- Accreditation: National Association of Private Schools
- Website: http://mcaknights.homestead.com

McAlester Christian Academy is a private Christian school located in McAlester, Oklahoma, United States.
