= University School (Tulsa, Oklahoma) =

The University School
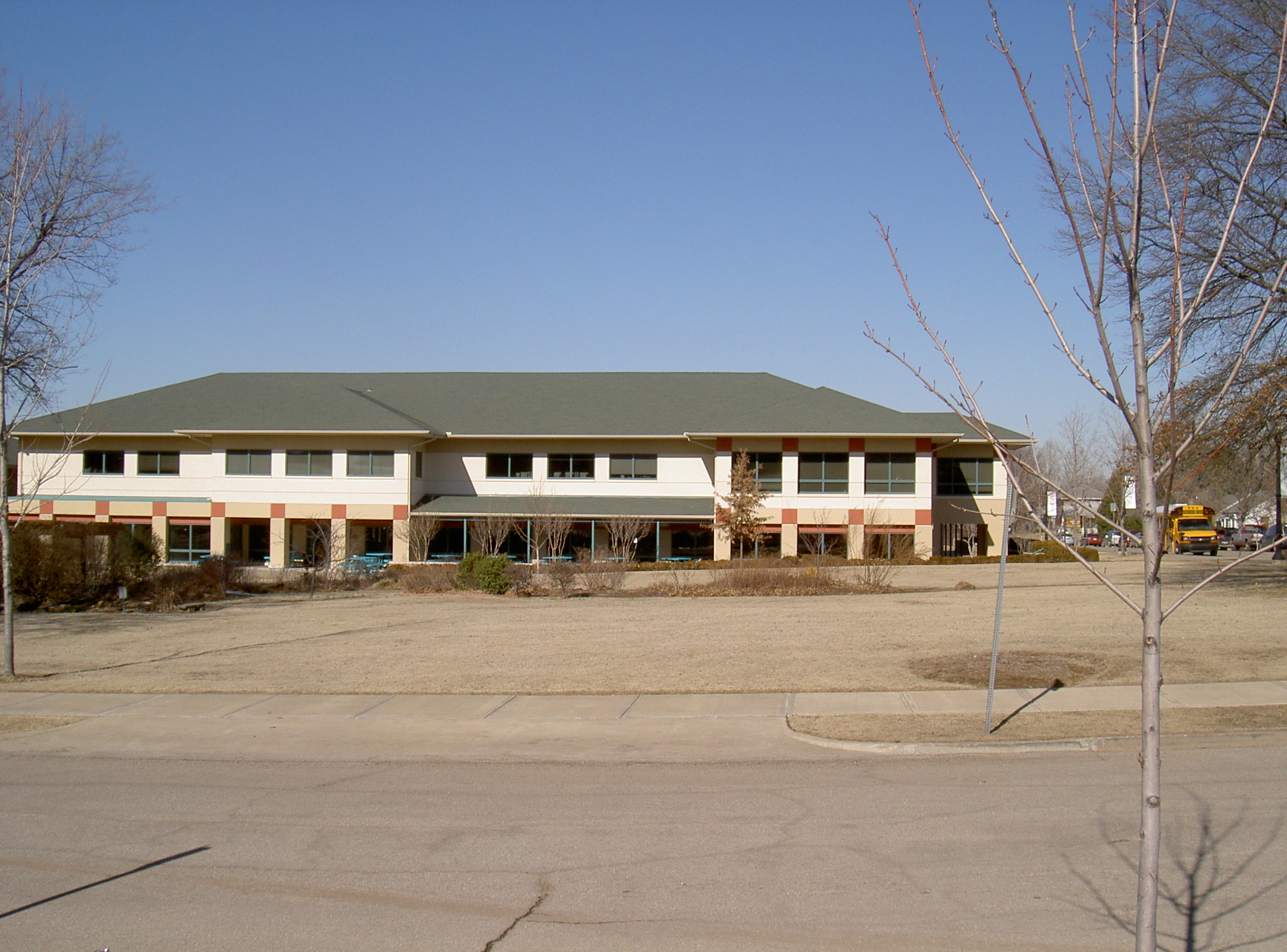

Location
- 326 S College Ave, Tulsa, OK 74104, United States; 36°9′19″N 95°56′48″W

Information
- Established: 1982

The University School is a school in Tulsa, Oklahoma that was founded in the spring of 1982 on the University of Tulsa campus.
