= University Schools (Colorado) =

Location
- 6525 W. 18th Street; Greeley, Colorado 80634; United States
- Coordinates: 40°24′40″N 104°47′25″W

Information
- Type: Charter school
- School district: Weld County School District Six
- Superintendent: Deirdre Pilch
- CEEB code: 060705
- Principal: Michael Mazurana (K–5); Nick Kintz (6–8); Jeff Casey (9–12)
- Faculty: 100.041 (on FTE basis)
- Grades: K to 12
- Gender: Co-education
- Enrollment: 1,780 (as of 2008–09)
- Colors: Navy and silver
- Mascot: The Bulldogs
- Website: www.universityschools.com

University Schools is the former lab school affiliated with the University of Northern Colorado. It is now a charter school located in Greeley, Colorado. This was a relatively small school, but due to recent additions, including a new middle school, the school size has grown significantly. University Schools is home of the Bulldogs and is a K-12 school. University School uses an online lottery method to choose new students for the upcoming year. University Schools operates off of a trimester system, but recently the middle school has switch to a combination of both trimesters and semesters. University Schools also does not provide transportation (i.e. School bus) to or from school.
