= Crossings Christian School =

School district in Oklahoma

Coordinates: 35°36′59″N 97°34′56″W

Location
- 14400 N. Portland Avenue; Oklahoma City, Oklahoma 73134; United States

Information
- Type: Private
- Motto: Developing Christ-centered servant leaders (Servitudo Deo Et Homini in Latin)
- Religious affiliation: Christian
- Established: 2000
- Headmaster: Jason Nave
- Grades: PS - 12
- Enrollment: 1100
- Student to teacher ratio: 18:1
- Colors: Red and Black
- Mascot: Percival the Knight
- Accreditation: Association of Christian Schools International
- Affiliation: Crossings Community Church
- Website: www.crossingsschool.org

Crossings Christian School is a private Christian school that serves approximately 1100 students in the greater Oklahoma City, Oklahoma area. The school is divided into four divisions: Crossings Upper School, Crossings Middle School, Crossings Lower School, and Crossings Early Childhood.

== History ==
Crossings Christian School was founded in 2000 as a ministry of Crossings Community Church, with 39 preschool students. It is financially and administratively separate from the church.

In 2005, Crossings Lower School opened at 14400 N. Portland Avenue. In 2007, Crossings Lower School added eight classrooms to the lower school. In 2010, Crossings Upper School opened across from the lower school, and a gymnasium and event lobby were added to the lower school. By the start of the second semester in the 2014–15 school year, all middle school faculty and students were moved from the upper school to the newly built middle school to accommodate its growing size.

== Campus ==
Crossings Christian School resides on the campus of Crossings Community Church.

The CCS Campus covers more than 200,000 square feet, including its first building, built in 2006 that houses lower school students ages kindergarten through fourth. The additional early childhood wing and a gymnasium were added in 2009. Fifth through eighth grade students moved into the middle school building, completed December 2014. The freshmen through senior classes have utilized the upper school facility since 2010 and the new commons, gymnasium, and performing arts facility since the spring of 2017.

The CCS Athletic Complex was completed in 2014 and covers eleven acres onsite and includes a football stadium, track and field, soccer, baseball, and softball facilities as well as a 10,000 square foot field house with locker, equipment, weight, and training rooms. CCS recently began progress on a new seven acre sports complex directly north of the upper school. These new facilities will include an eight tennis court complex and soccer practice and game field. A 7,500 square foot recreation building will bridge the two complexes and is designed for large and small group activities as well as home tennis and soccer locker rooms.

== Academics ==
CCS has over 1,115 students in preschool through twelfth grade. The school is divided into four divisions: Crossings Upper School, Crossings Middle School, Crossings Lower School, and Crossings Early Childhood. The upper school offers nineteen AP courses offered on campus.

CCS is accredited through the Association of Christian Schools International (ACSI) and reciprocally accredited through the state of Oklahoma.

== Student activities ==
CCS students participate in extra and co-curricular activities including art, vocals, band, jazz band, orchestra, debate, and student clubs. In addition, there is weekly chapel, daily Bible studies, and small group study opportunities.

== Athletics ==
CCS students participate in thirteen OSSAA sanctioned athletic opportunities. The school's colors are red and black. Its mascot is Percival the Knight.
