= Byng, Oklahoma =

- Town
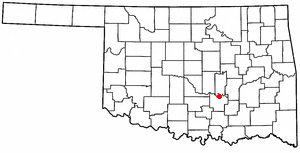
- Location of Byng, Oklahoma
- Coordinates: 34°51′56″N 96°40′04″W
- Country: United States
- State: Oklahoma
- County: Pontotoc

Area
  - Total: 6.52 sq mi (16.89 km^{2})
  - Land: 6.52 sq mi (16.89 km^{2})
  - Water: 0 sq mi (0.00 km^{2})
- Elevation: 997 ft (304 m)

Population (2020)
  - Total: 1,393
  - Density: 213.6/sq mi (82.46/km^{2})
- Time zone: UTC-6 (Central (CST))
  - Summer (DST): UTC-5 (CDT)
- FIPS code: 40-10600
- GNIS feature ID: 2413143
- Website: byngok.com

Byng is a town in Pontotoc County, Oklahoma, United States. As of the 2020 census, Byng had a population of 1,393.

== History ==
The beginnings of the town of Byng were established in 1917 with the building of a post office and power plant (about five miles north of Ada). The post office and power plant were named to honor the World War I exploits of British General Julian Byng who commanded the Canadian Corps and was later Governor General of Canada. The town was not formally formed until 1922 when the remains of two other communities were merged into Byng. Tyrola, about a mile north of Byng, was almost wiped out by a flooding of the South Canadian River in 1914. New Bethel, also approximately a mile north of present-day Byng, but lying east of Tyrola, had also been formed. The school at New Bethel and the school at Tyrola were combined to create New Bethel Consolidated Number 3 in 1925, and the name was changed to Byng in 1929. The town incorporated in 1972.

== Geography ==
According to the United States Census Bureau, the town has a total area of 6.5 square miles (17 km^{2}), all land.

The town is on U.S. Route 377. Ada is to the south, while the town of Konawa, as well as Lake Konawa, are to the north-northwest.

== Demographics ==
Historical population
Census	Pop.	Note	%±
1980	833		—
1990	755		−9.4%
2000	1,090		44.4%
2010	1,175		7.8%
2020	1,393		18.6%
U.S. Decennial Census

=== 2020 census ===
As of the 2020 census, Byng had a population of 1,393. The median age was 36.7 years. 28.9% of residents were under the age of 18 and 14.2% of residents were 65 years of age or older. For every 100 females there were 97.9 males, and for every 100 females age 18 and over there were 91.5 males age 18 and over.

0.0% of residents lived in urban areas, while 100.0% lived in rural areas.

There were 495 households in Byng, of which 42.8% had children under the age of 18 living in them. Of all households, 58.4% were married-couple households, 13.5% were households with a male householder and no spouse or partner present, and 21.0% were households with a female householder and no spouse or partner present. About 17.4% of all households were made up of individuals and 8.7% had someone living alone who was 65 years of age or older.

There were 548 housing units, of which 9.7% were vacant. The homeowner vacancy rate was 2.4% and the rental vacancy rate was 7.4%.

Racial composition as of the 2020 census
Race	Number	Percent
White	801	57.5%
Black or African American	17	1.2%
American Indian and Alaska Native	321	23.0%
Asian	6	0.4%
Native Hawaiian and Other Pacific Islander	0	0.0%
Some other race	23	1.7%
Two or more races	225	16.2%
Hispanic or Latino (of any race)	88	6.3%

=== 2000 census ===
As of the census of 2000, there were 1,090 people, 389 households, and 310 families residing in the town. The population density was 167.1 inhabitants per square mile (64.5/km^{2}). There were 434 housing units at an average density of 66.5 per square mile (25.7/km^{2}). The racial makeup of the town was 74.50% White, 2.02% African American, 16.15% Native American, 1.65% from other races, and 5.69% from two or more races. Hispanic or Latino of any race were 3.30% of the population.

There were 389 households, out of which 39.8% had children under the age of 18 living with them, 63.8% were married couples living together, 12.1% had a female householder with no husband present, and 20.3% were non-families. 17.2% of all households were made up of individuals, and 6.4% had someone living alone who was 65 years of age or older. The average household size was 2.80 and the average family size was 3.14.

In the town, the population was spread out, with 29.8% under the age of 18, 8.0% from 18 to 24, 27.9% from 25 to 44, 23.9% from 45 to 64, and 10.5% who were 65 years of age or older. The median age was 36 years. For every 100 females, there were 93.3 males. For every 100 females age 18 and over, there were 96.2 males.

The median income for a household in the town was $33,229, and the median income for a family was $38,906. Males had a median income of $27,596 versus $19,868 for females. The per capita income for the town was $15,028. About 11.8% of families and 15.4% of the population were below the poverty line, including 22.4% of those under age 18 and 9.4% of those age 65 or over.

== Education ==
It is within the Byng Public Schools school district.

== Notable people ==
- Benjamin Harjo Jr. (Absentee Shawnee/Seminole), visual artist
- Don Kaiser, baseball player
