= Harding Fine Arts Academy =

School in Oklahoma, United States

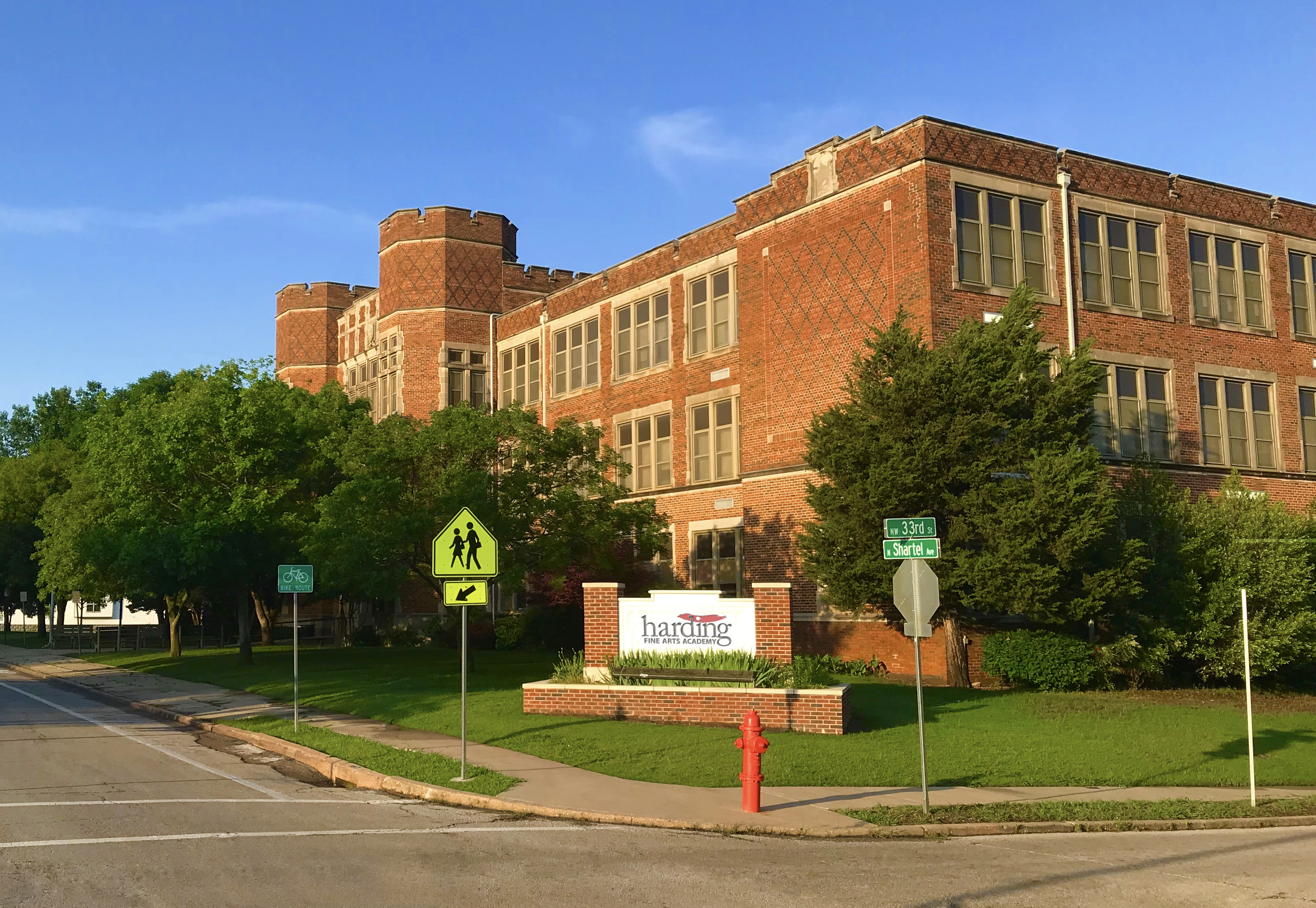

Location
- 3333 North Shartel Avenue; Oklahoma City, Oklahoma 73118; United States; 35°30′14″N 97°31′34″W

Information
- School type: Charter school
- Motto: Arts, Academics, Achievement
- Founded: 2005
- Founder: John Lampton Belt
- Authorizer: Oklahoma City Public Schools
- Superintendent: Barry Schmelzenbach
- Principal: Keith Campbell
- Teaching staff: 25.50 (FTE)
- Grades: 9–12
- Enrollment: 398 (2023-2024)
- Average class size: 80-100
- Student to teacher ratio: 15.61
- Colors: Red and Black
- Mascot: Firehawk
- Newspaper: The Beat
- Harding Junior High School
- U.S. National Register of Historic Places
- Built: 1924
- Architect: Layton, Smith, & Forsyth
- Architectural style: Collegiate Gothic
- NRHP reference No.: 02000172
- Added to NRHP: March 13, 2002

Harding Fine Arts Academy (HFAA) is a college preparatory high school in Oklahoma City, Oklahoma. It is sponsored by the University of Science and Arts of Oklahoma.

HFAA serves students from grade 9 to 12. It is a public, charter high school; there is no tuition. As a charter school, admission is open to all students with interest in the fine arts. The school also receives Title I funding. HFAA uses auditions and testing for placement, but not as a requirement for acceptance. The school accepts only 150 students per school year.

The average class size is between 15 and 20 students per class. The student-teacher ratio is 12 to 1. The curriculum integrates the arts, and students are required to take 6 arts electives to graduate.

Harding Fine Arts Academy was founded in 2005 by attorney John L. Belt. HFAA owns the historic Harding High School building dating to 1924 after their bid to purchase it was approved by the Oklahoma City Public School Board. The school's swimming pool has been converted into a dance studio.

HFAA is a National Blue Ribbon school and has been placed in the top 5 in Oklahoma by U.S. News & World Report, the top 500 for disadvantaged students nationwide by Newsweek, rated A+ by the Oklahoma Department of Education and was the first school to be rated OKA+ by the University of Central Oklahoma.
