= Will Shields =

American football player (born 1971)

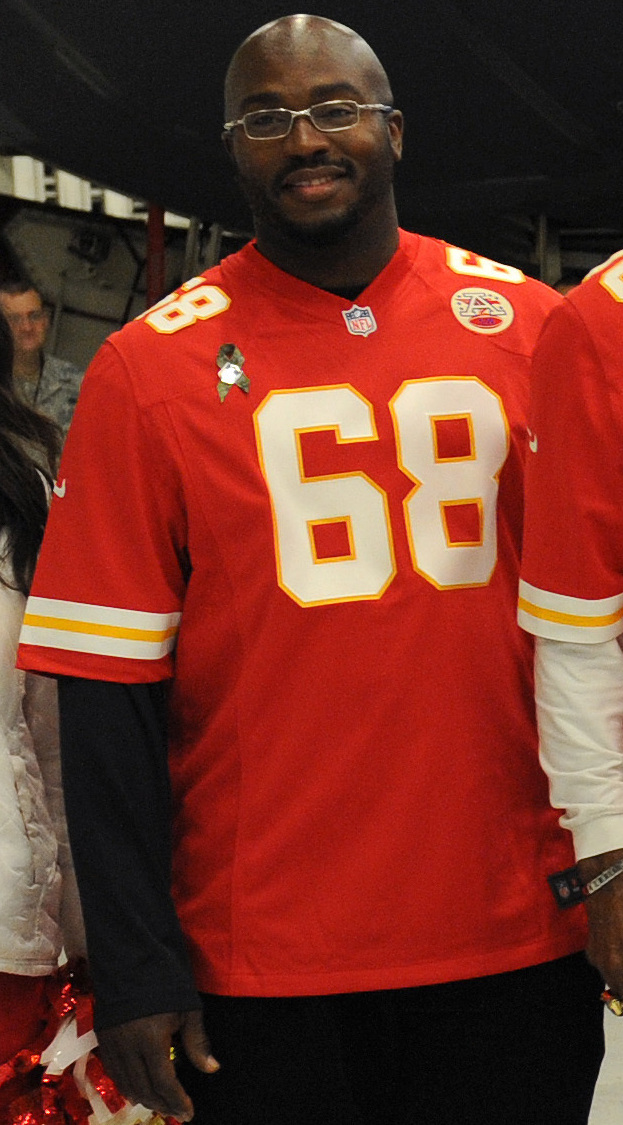
- Shields at Whiteman Air Force Base in 2014

No. 68
- Position: Guard

Personal information
- Born: September 15, 1971 (age 55); Fort Riley, Kansas, U.S.
- Listed height: 6 ft 3 in (1.91 m)
- Listed weight: 315 lb (143 kg)

Career information
- High school: Lawton (Lawton, Oklahoma)
- College: Nebraska (1989–1992)
- NFL draft: 1993: 3rd round, 74th overall pick

Career history
- Kansas City Chiefs (1993–2006)

Awards and highlights
- Walter Payton NFL Man of the Year (2003); 3× First-team All-Pro (1999, 2002, 2003); 4× Second-team All-Pro (1997, 2004–2006); 12× Pro Bowl (1995–2006); NFL 2000s All-Decade Team; PFWA All-Rookie Team (1993); Kansas City Chiefs Hall of Fame; Outland Trophy (1992); Unanimous All-American (1992); Second-team All-American (1991); 2× First-team All-Big Eight (1991, 1992); Second-team All-Big Eight (1990); Nebraska Cornhuskers Jersey No. 75 retired

Career NFL statistics
- Games played: 224
- Games started: 223
- Fumble recoveries: 9
- Stats at Pro Football Reference
- Pro Football Hall of Fame
- College Football Hall of Fame

Will Herthie Shields (born September 15, 1971) is an American former professional football player who was a guard in the National Football League (NFL) for 14 seasons. He played college football for the Nebraska Cornhuskers, earning consensus All-American honors and winning the Outland Trophy. Shields played his entire, 14-year professional career with the Kansas City Chiefs and never missed a game. Shields was selected to 12 Pro Bowls, was a three-time First-Team All-Pro, a four-time Second-Team All-Pro, and was selected to the NFL 2000s All-Decade Team. He won the Walter Payton NFL Man of the Year award in the 2003 season, was inducted into the College Football Hall of Fame in 2011, and was inducted into the Pro Football Hall of Fame in 2015.

== Early life ==
Shields was born in Fort Riley, Kansas. He graduated from Lawton High School in Lawton, Oklahoma, where he played for the Lawton Wolverines high school football team. As a junior in 1987, he and fellow juniors Dewell Brewer, Butch Huskey, Kelly Stinnett and James Trapp won an Oklahoma state championship.

== College career ==
While attending the University of Nebraska–Lincoln, Shields played for the Nebraska Cornhuskers football team from 1989 through 1992. Shields was a consensus first-team All-American and Outland Trophy winner during his final year at Nebraska. He is one of eight Cornhuskers players to win the Outland Trophy. In 1999, he was selected to the Nebraska All-Century Football Team via fan poll and to the All-Century Nebraska football team by Gannett News Service. In 2002, he was named to the Athlon Sports Nebraska All-Time Team. He is one of only 16 Cornhuskers to have his jersey retired by the team. In 1999 Shields was selected as an offensive guard to the Walter Camp Football Foundation College Football All Century Team. The other offensive guards selected were John Hannah of Alabama, Aaron Taylor of Nebraska, Brad Budde of USC, Dean Steinkuhler of Nebraska and Jim Parker of Ohio State. Shields was one of six Nebraska Cornhuskers selected to this team; the others being Johnny Rodgers, Dave Rimington, Steinkuhler, Tommie Frazier and Taylor.

== Professional career ==
Pre-draft measurables
Height	Weight	Arm length	Hand span	40-yard dash	10-yard split	20-yard split	20-yard shuttle	Vertical jump	Broad jump	Bench press
6 ft 2 1/4 in (1.89 m)	304 lb (138 kg)	34 3/8 in (0.87 m)	10 3/8 in (0.26 m)	5.21 s	1.77 s	2.99 s	4.60 s	26.0 in (0.66 m)	8 ft 7 in (2.62 m)	18 reps
All values from NFL Combine

Shields was the third-round (74th overall) pick of the Kansas City Chiefs in the 1993 NFL draft, after signing now Chicago Bears president Kevin Warren to be his agent. Shields played for the Chiefs from 1993 to 2006. Beginning with a September 12, 1993 game against the Houston Oilers, he was in the Chiefs' starting lineup for every game, a team record and at the time, the second longest active consecutive starting streak in the NFL behind Brett Favre of the Green Bay Packers. He started 231 straight games (including playoffs) at the right guard position; an NFL record. He went to the Pro Bowl every year from 1995 to 2006, a total of 12, a Chiefs team record, and having played in all of them, he is tied with Champ Bailey and Randall McDaniel for most Pro Bowls played. He was an important part in the Kansas City Chiefs offensive line that consistently led the team to a top 5 finish in rushing offense.

Shields blocked for Marcus Allen, Priest Holmes and Larry Johnson during his career. He had blocked for 1,000-yard rushers for five seasons. He blocked for 4,000-yard passers for five seasons while Elvis Grbac did it in 2000 and Trent Green in 2003, 2004, and 2005. In 14 seasons, Shields never missed a game, and he failed to start only one contest, his first regular-season outing, as a rookie in 1993. On April 15, 2007, following 14 seasons with the Kansas City Chiefs, he announced his retirement from football.

== Life after football ==
Shields currently works for NFL Legends as Community Central South Director. Shields is married to his wife Senia (a native of Denmark); they have one daughter, Sanayika, and two sons, Shavon and Solomon. The Shields family resides in Stillwell, Kansas. Shavon played basketball for the University of Nebraska and currently plays professionally in Italy for Olimpia Milano, while Sanayika is a former basketball player for Drury University who is now an Emergency Medicine/Pediatrics Resident at Indiana University. Solomon is starting his film career writing and directing documentaries.

== Honors ==
- In 2003 Shields was the recipient of the Walter Payton Man of the Year Award, for his work in The "Will to Succeed" Foundation, the charitable organization he started in 1993.
- In 2011, he was inducted into the College Football Hall of Fame.
- Shields was selected as a first-ballot finalist for the Pro Football Hall of Fame in 2012.
- In 2012 Shields was inducted into the Kansas City Chiefs Hall of Fame.
- Inducted into the Pro Football Hall of Fame in 2015.
