= Valree Fletcher Wynn =

American academic (1922–2021)

- Born: Valree Fletcher; May 9, 1922; Rockwall, Texas, U.S.
- Died: September 25, 2021 (aged 99); Lawton, Oklahoma, U.S.
- Occupation: Educator
- Known for: First African-American professor at Cameron University
- Spouse: Phail Wynn Sr.

Valree Fletcher Wynn (May 9, 1922 – September 25, 2021) was the first African-American professor at Cameron University from 1966 until her retirement in 1985. Wynn became the first African-American to serve on the Board of Regents of Oklahoma Colleges in 1986 and served as the president from 1988–1989. She was the recipient of many awards and was inducted into both the Oklahoma Women's Hall of Fame and the Oklahoma Higher Education Hall of Fame.

== Early life ==
Wynn was born in Rockwall, Texas in May 1922. She grew up in Sentinel, Oklahoma, a town without a school for black children. After attempting to send Wynn to a nearby town with a couple so that she might have an education, her parents brought her back home and petitioned for the building of a school. After a year, the school was burnt to the ground, so Valree's parents held class inside of their own home. Once she finished eighth grade, Wynn was sent to Lawton, Oklahoma to attend school at Douglass High School, 80 miles away from her parents' home. She would travel there and back on the weekends.

== Education ==
After graduating high school in 1939, Wynn moved to Pueblo, Colorado to live with her aunt and uncle in order to attend a junior college. At this junior college, Wynn first experienced being treated equally as an intellectual by her peers and professors. In 1941, Wynn began attending Langston University in Langston, Oklahoma as an English major, where she met her husband before the outbreak of World War II. Next, Wynn attended Oklahoma State University in Stillwater, Oklahoma for her graduate degree, which she finished in 1951. Wynn was the first full-time student enrolled in the newly developed doctorate program for English. She was forty-six years old when she returned to complete her doctorate, finishing in 1976.

== Career ==
Upon graduation, Wynn worked briefly at the Pentagon but decided she would rather teach in the more rural towns in Oklahoma. She began teaching fourth grade at Douglass. In 1965, Douglass closed due to integration and Wynn was transferred to Lawton High School where she worked for a year as an English teacher. After teaching in Lawton, Wynn was asked to come interview at Cameron University for a teaching position in the English department. She returned temporarily to Oklahoma State to finish her doctorate degree in order to teach at the university. After finishing her degree, Wynn returned to Cameron and taught for 19 years. She was the first African-American to teach at the institution.

=== Impact on Education ===
While teaching at Cameron University, Wynn was the co-sponsor of the Ebony Society and helped to develop the Miss Black CU pageant.

== Achievements and awards ==
Upon retirement from Cameron University, George Nigh appointed Wynn to serve on the Board of Regents of Oklahoma Colleges in 1986. She was the first African-American to be appointed to the board and served as the president from 1988–1989. She served on the Board of Regents for seven years. Other achievements include:

- President's Council of Regional Universities for meritorious service (1993)
- Oklahoma Women's Hall of Fame (1996)
- Oklahoma Higher Education Hall of Fame (2005)
- Lawton Chamber of Commerce Professor of the Year (1985)
- St. John's Baptist Church Woman of the Year (1992)
- Delta Sigma Theta Outstanding Educator (1985)
- Outstanding Citizen (1987)
- Alpha Kappa Alpha Golden Soror (1992)
- OSU Graduate Excellence Award (1970–73)
- NAFEO Distinguished Alumnnus Award (1990)
- Cameron University Distinguished Service Award
- Valree F. Wynn Scholarship established at Cameron University

=== Service and Involvement ===
- Alpha Kappa Alpha sorority
- Phi Kappa Phi honor society
- Board of Directors for the Lawton Public Schools Foundation
- US Senator David Boren's Foundation for Excellence
- State Martin Luther King Jr. Holiday Commission

== Personal life ==
Wynn was married to Phail Wynn Sr. (1920–1973), with whom she had two sons, Phail Wynn Jr. and Michael Wynn Wynn died on September 25, 2021, at the age of 99.
