= Hauser (disambiguation) =

Hauser may refer to

- Hauser, the professional name of Stjepan Hauser (born 1986), Croatian cellist
- Hauser, Idaho, in the United States
- Hauser, Oregon, in the United States

== See also ==
- Hauser (surname), a German language surname
