= Hausel =

Hausel is a surname. Notable people with the surname include:

- Dan Hausel (born 1949), American karateka, geologist and writer
- Tamás Hausel (born 1972), Hungarian mathematician

== See also ==
- Hauser
