= Lambird =

Lambird is a surname. Notable people with the surname include:

- Mona Salyer Lambird (1938–1999), American lawyer
- Robyn Lambird (born 1997), Australian wheelchair racer and model
