= Creveling =

Creveling is a surname. Notable people with the surname include:

- Chris Creveling (born 1986), American short track speed skater
- Ginny Creveling, Philippine-American activist
- Maria Creveling (1995–2019), legal name of Remilia, American professional gamer
