= June Tompkins Benson =

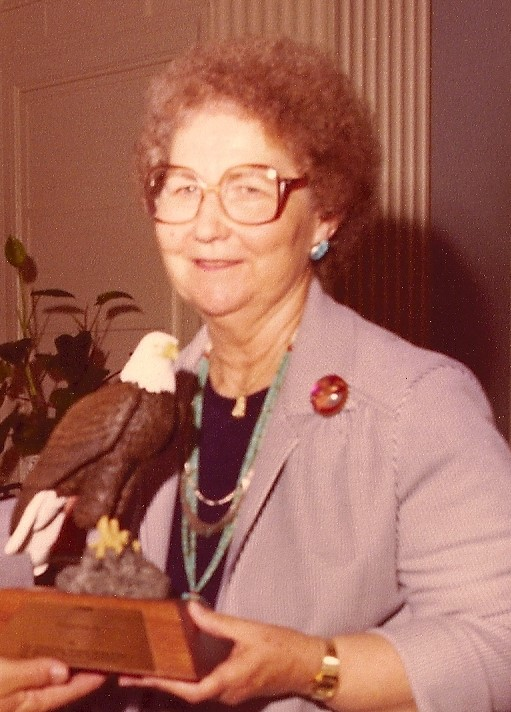
- Tompkins Benson being awarded the Oklahoma Conservationist of the Year in 1980

Mayor of Norman, Oklahoma
- In office May 14, 1957 – 1961

Personal details
- Born: Mildred June Tompkins; November 16, 1915 Granite, Oklahoma, US
- Died: September 15, 1981 (aged 65)
- Spouse: Oliver Earl Benson
- Children: 2
- Education: University of Oklahoma

Mildred June Benson (née Tomkins), commonly known as June Benson (1915–1981), was the first woman to serve as mayor in the American State of Oklahoma when elected mayor of Norman in 1957 by city commissioners. Benson was inducted into the Oklahoma Women's Hall of Fame in 1985, thanks also to the significant contributions she made on voting rights and environmental protection.

== Early life and education ==
Mildred June Tompkins was born on November 6, 1915, in Granite, Oklahoma, the daughter of the Oklahoma legislator Elmer O. Tompkins and his wife, Bessie Stovall. She was brought up in McAlester where she attended public schools before studying history and government at the University of Oklahoma, graduating in 1947. She married the political research professor Oliver Earl Benson on June 1, 1940 in Guthrie, Oklahoma. In 1954, she gained an M.A. in political science with a thesis on voting law reform.

== Career ==
In 1952, Benson was the first woman to be elected to Norman's City Commission. On May 14, 1957, she was elected mayor of Norman as "Mrs. Oliver Benson". Shortly afterwards, on May 26 she witnessed Gov. Raymond Gary's signing a bill to set up a central county voter registration system. Known as the Oklahoma Election Reform Act, it included measures for recording voters' signatures and the periodic removal of the names of those who had died or moved away. The act represented acceptance of the proposals she had made in her university thesis on Election Practices in Oklahoma.

Among her successes while mayor was progress on noise control, waste oil collections and water quality. She also initiated the appointment of trained city managers. After her term as mayor, she contributed actively to Common Cause, the Oklahoma Municipal League (as director), the League of Women Voters (Oklahoma president) and the Community Development Block Grant program (chair). She also served eight times as chair of Norman's Environmental Control Advisory Board. In 1979, she was appointed chair of Oklahoma's State Pollution Control Coordinating Board and in 1980 was named Oklahoma Conservationist of the Year.

== Family and heritage ==
Benson and her husband had two children, Megan Benson and John Michael Benson. She died on September 15, 1981. Norman's June Benson Park is named after her. The June Benson Collection held by University of Oklahoma Libraries contains correspondence, municipal reports, minutes of city government boards and related papers.

== Role in women's history ==
As the first woman mayor in Oklahoma, Benson can be listed with Alice Mary Robertson, the first woman from the state to serve in the U.S. Congress, Jessie Thatcher Bost, the first woman to graduate from Oklahoma Agricultural and Mechanical College, and Alma Wilson, the first woman to serve at the Oklahoma Supreme Court.
