= Haaser =

Haaser is a surname. Notable people with the surname include:

- Hans Richter-Haaser (1912–1980), German classical pianist
- Raphael Haaser (born 1997), Austrian alpine ski racer
- Ricarda Haaser (born 1993), Austrian alpine ski racer

== See also ==
- Hauser
