= Joan Gilmore =

American journalist (1927–2022)

- Joan Gilmore, from a 1951 newspaper
- Born: May 15, 1927; Waukegan, Illinois
- Died: May 9, 2022 (aged 94); Oklahoma City, Oklahoma
- Occupation(s): Journalist, newspaper editor, publicist

Joan Elizabeth Gilmore (May 15, 1927 – May 9, 2022) was an American journalist based in Oklahoma City, where she was an editor and columnist at The Daily Oklahoman beginning in 1952. She was inducted into the Oklahoma Journalism Hall of Fame and the Oklahoma Women's Hall of Fame.

== Early life and education ==
Gilmore was born in Waukegan, Illinois, the daughter of Joseph Gilmore and Helen Parks Gilmore. She graduated from Waukegan High School in 1945. She attended James Millikin University and in January 1951 earned an English degree from Drury University in Springfield, Missouri. In 1961, she attended a two-week seminar for women editors, held by the American Press Institute of Columbia University.

== Career ==
After college, Gilmore wrote a weekly column for The Drury Mirror and subsequently contributed to a Springfield local newspaper.

In 1951, Gilmore was named society editor of the Muskogee Daily Phoenix. In 1952, she became affiliated with The Daily Oklahoman and The Oklahoma City Times. Starting as a reporter for the society department, she advanced to the role of women's news editor. She reported from New York Fashion Week and similar press events in the 1960s and 1970s, and returned to New York City to report on the Christmas shopping and store windows in 1966. During her tenure, she met Al McLaughlin, the photo department director, whom she later married. After 28 years with The Daily Oklahoman, she transitioned to co-founding a PR and videography business with McLaughlin. Later, she became a columnist for The Journal Record, where she wrote for over 32 years. She cowrote a biography, Old Man River: The Life of Ray Ackerman (2002, with Bob Burke).

Outside of her professional work, Gilmore was involved in various civic and nonprofit organizations. She was a founding member of Leadership Oklahoma City and Oklahoma Children's Medical Research Foundation. She also served on the boards of institutions including the Oklahoma Symphony Orchestra, Ballet Oklahoma, and the Oklahoma City National Memorial Foundation.

== Awards and recognition ==
Among the recognitions she received during her career were Lifetime Achievement Awards from The Journal Record and the Oklahoma City chapter of The Association for Women in Communications. She was inducted into the Oklahoma Journalism Hall of Fame in 1994, and in 2018 to the Oklahoma Women's Hall of Fame. She also received awards from the Governor's Arts Award program.

== Personal life and legacy ==
Gilmore married fellow newspaper editor Al McLaughlin in 1974. Her husband died in 2013. She retired from her column in 2020, at age 93, and she died in 2022, at the age of 94, in Oklahoma City. She left $30,000 to the Oklahoma Journalism Hall of Fame, for a future museum and scholarship fund.
