= Chloe Brown =

American educator and advocate for homeless women

- Born: Tulsa, Oklahoma
- Occupation: Educator
- Known for: Founder of The Chloe House, a transition home for women
- Spouse: Theo Brown

Chloe Brown is a longtime educator in the Tulsa Public Schools district, who was the first African-American teacher at Eliot Elementary School. First African American Reading Specialist in Jenks Public Schools. She is an active member of the Tulsa community, volunteering to tutor homeless children, distribute food, and work with women in crisis. Ministers at the Turley Correctional Center. Brown founded The Chloe House in 2006, a transition home for women that provides housing, training for employment, and resources to help them re-enter society. She is also a licensed minister and was inducted into the Oklahoma Women's Hall of Fame in 2011. Chloe and her husband Doug are Grief Share and Marriage Coaches.

== Early life ==
Chloe L. Brown was born in Tulsa, Oklahoma and grew up in the historic Greenwood District. The church played a large role during her childhood, as her father was a minister and would host church services in their home. Brown's mother highly valued education and insured that her children value the institution equally. From this early influence, Brown was determined to become and educator and developed an early passion for the profession. The first school Brown attended was John Burroughs Elementary. Brown's was the first class to integrate John Burroughs, though she does not have explicit negative memories of strained race relations. Brown eventually graduated from Booker T. Washington High School and went on to earn a bachelor's degree in education from Langston University in 1975. Brown was the first in her family to graduate from college.

Brown also holds a master's degree in Elementary Education Administration from Northeastern State University.

== Career ==
Brown taught her first class at Cooper Elementary School with Dr. Joann Bell. Later, Brown was the first African-American teacher at Eliot Elementary School in Tulsa, one of the elementary schools that fed into Cascia Hall and Monte Cassino. After spending several years at Eliot, Brown moved for a brief time to North Dallas and taught there for three years. Upon returning to Tulsa, Brown was promoted to the administrative level, but soon after she happily returned to the classroom after her brief time in administration and teaches at McClure Elementary School.

Outside of the classroom, Brown found a passion for helping the homeless and more specifically, rehabilitating incarcerated women. Brown and her husband created the Chloe House in 2006, a transition home that aided the reintegration of incarcerated women into society by providing housing and training for employment. She is also a member of the Greenwood Christian Center and is a licensed minister.

On October 27, 2016, Chloe L. Brown officially launched her campaign for Tulsa Public Schools Board District 2, vowing to bring her 44 years of experience from a lifelong career educating Tulsa children and empowering them to become lifelong learners. “Right now our children and educators need leadership on our school board from experienced teachers. During the span of my 44 year career in public education, I have taught in a variety of schools all over Tulsa. I know firsthand the basic needs of our children, as well as the essential tools our educators need to empower them to succeed,” said Brown. “I will fight for our children and teachers every day.” Election day is Tuesday, February 14, 2017.
