= Jack Zink =

American engineer

- Born: John Smith Zink; October 17, 1928; Tulsa, Oklahoma
- Died: February 5, 2005 (aged 76); Tulsa, Oklahoma
- Other names: John S. Zink, Jr.; Jack Smith Zink
- Occupations: Founder of Zeeco, Inc.; Businessman; engineer
- Known for: Business, Auto Racing, philanthropy
- Relatives: Jill Zink Tarbel (sister)

John Smith "Jack" Zink (October 17, 1928 – February 5, 2005), founder of Zeeco, Inc., was an American engineer who received 35 patents for his inventions in the field of combustion, and was also known for his achievements and contributions in business, auto racing and charitable enterprises.

== Business ==
After graduation, he joined the John Zink Company, which his father had founded in 1929. By then, the company had specialized in manufacturing burners, flares, and incinerators for the petroleum and related industries. Jack received 35 patents for his inventions of combustion equipment. He continued to run the company from 1962 until 1979 when it was bought by Sunbeam Corporation. (Note: John Zink Company has since become a subsidiary of Koch Industries.) After his father's company was sold, Jack purchased a small company called "Product Manufacturing" and changed the name to Zinkco. "When the new owners of the John Zink Company complained that the "Zink" name was an international trademark for combustion equipment in the same way that "Kleenex" was a trademark for tissue and "Xerox" was a trademark for photocopiers, Jack changed the name of his company to Zeeco." While their headquarters are in Tulsa, OK, the company manufactures in the United States and other global locations. Jack passed control of Zeeco over to his son Darton in 2000. The University of Tulsa recognized him in 2001 as that year's Outstanding Business Leader. Jack served on the board of directors for several companies including Telex and Sunbeam.

== Auto racing ==
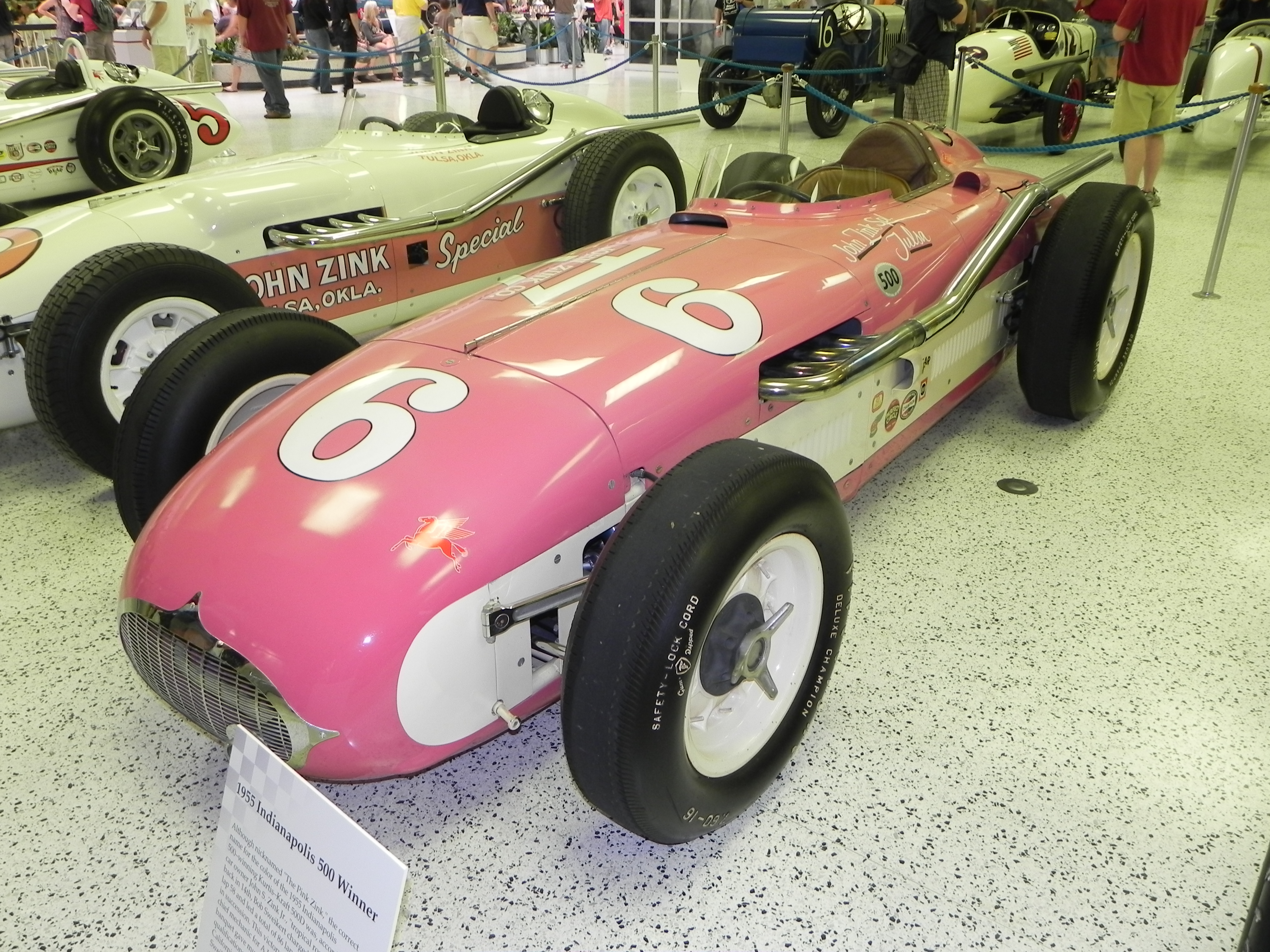
Winning car of the 1955 Indianapolis 500

Jack Zink was a sports enthusiast, and became especially identified with auto racing. He became involved not only in driving his own race car, but in design and construction of the vehicles. He first sponsored a race car in the 1952 Indianapolis 500 race, and continued to enter a car in each race until 1967. His entries won the races in 1955 and 1956. In 1957, he set a stock-auto speed record at Daytona Beach. He drove his own cars in desert off-road races from 1972 through 1980. He was inducted into the Auto Racing Hall of Fame in 2004.

== Motorcycle racing ==
Jack also competed in the 1972 Baja 1000 riding a Husqvarna 400 with fellow Oklahoman Vern Street. Racing in category 8, motorcycles over 125cc's, they finished the grueling 1000 mile event in 6th place in their class and 24th overall out of 259 entries. Their total time was 25 hours/11 minutes. It was Jack's first off road motorcycle race, while his partner Vern, was a highly accomplished national caliber competitor. The bike now resides at the Zink Ranch Museum in Oklahoma.

In 1994 Jack agreed to host the International Six Days Enduro (ISDE) at the rugged Zink Ranch. The Tulsa Trail Riders motorcycle club, founded in 1956, ran overall logistics and computerized rider scoring. Over 600 participants from all over the world competed for medals and trophies in this most prestigious off road event. The ISDE is widely known as the "Olympics of Motorcycling" as it tests not only rider skill/stamina but also machine reliability. Founded in 1913, this was only the second time in history the event was held in the USA.

== Charitable enterprises and civic activities ==
Jack Zink became chairman of the John Zink Foundation, which his father, John Steele Zink, had founded. The foundation owned the John Zink ranch in Osage County, Oklahoma. Jack's father had started the working ranch many years before, but Jack had expanded it to 31,000 acres (13,000 ha). He also converted it to a private game preserve and recreation area. It also contains campgrounds for Boy Scouts and Girl Scouts. The Boy Scouts of America awarded him the Silver Beaver Award and Silver Buffalo Award.

He was a frequent volunteer for the Tulsa Area United Way and became an honorary life member of United Way. In 1988, he served as chairman of the Tulsa organization and was credited with raising $12.5 million in contributions. He also received the Volunteers of America's Premier Award and the National Jewish Humanitarian Award.

== 1980 U.S. Senate candidate ==
Zink was also interested in politics. His obituary in the Tulsa World called him, "a well-known Republican (party) operative." He ran for election as a Republican Party candidate for the United States Senate in 1980, but lost the nomination to Don Nickles, who went on to win the general election.

== Personal life ==
Zink was the son of John Steele Zink and Swannie Estelle Smith Zink. He was born and grew up in Tulsa, Oklahoma, and was educated at Oklahoma State University, where he earned a bachelor's degree in mechanical engineering in 1951. He died in Tulsa on February 5, 2005. Jack was survived by his wife, Jan, three sons, three stepchildren and a sister, Jill Zink Tarbel. A fourth son, Colin, died in 1993.

Zink died in Tulsa on February 5, 2005.

== Motorsports career results ==
=== NASCAR ===
(key) (Bold – Pole position awarded by qualifying time. Italics – Pole position earned by points standings or practice time. * – Most laps led.)

==== Grand National Series ====
NASCAR Grand National Series results
Year	Team	No.	Make	1	2	3	4	5	6	7	8	9	10	11	12	13	14	15	16	17	18	19	20	21	22	23	24	25	26	27	28	29	30	31	32	33	34	35	36	37	38	39	40	41	42	43	44	45	46	47	48	49	50	51	52	53	54	55	56	NGNC	Pts
1956	John Zink	88	Pontiac	HCY	CLT	WSS	PBS	ASF	DAB	PBS	WIL	ATL	NWS	LAN	RCH	CLB	CON	GPS	HCY	HBO	MAR	LIN	CLT	POR	EUR	NYF	MER	MAS	CLT	MCF	POR	AWS	RSP	PIF	CSF	CHI	CCF	MGY	OKL; 12	ROA	OBS	SAN	NOR	PIF	MYB	POR	DAR	CSH	CLT	LAN	POR	CLB	HBO	NWP	CLT	CCF	MAR	HCY	WIL	195th	
