= Pat Woodrum =

- Born: Patricia Ann Hoffman; October 11, 1941 (age 84); Hutchinson, Kansas
- Education: University of Oklahoma
- Occupation: Librarian
- Known for: Former Executive Director of the Tulsa City-County Library System, executive director of the Oklahoma Centennial Botanical Garden now known as http://www.tulsabotanic.org/ The Tulsa Botanic Garden in Tulsa
- Spouse: Clayton Woodrum
- Children: Clayton E Woodrum II

Pat Woodrum is the former executive director of the Tulsa City-County Library System, a position she served in for 32 years. Since retiring from the library system in 2008, Woodrum has served as the executive director of the Oklahoma Centennial Botanical Garden in Tulsa. Among numerous awards, Woodrum was inducted in the Oklahoma Women's Hall of Fame in 1993.

== Early life ==
Pat Woodrum was born in Hutchinson, Kansas in 1941, the eldest of four children. At the age of twelve, her family moved to Parsons, Kansas. She began working at the Parsons Public Library at age fifteen. Woodrum was married to husband Clayton Woodrum at age twenty, while she was still in college. She earned her bachelor's degree from Pittsburg State Teacher's College and later a master's degree in library science from the University of Oklahoma.

== Career ==
Three days after her graduation from OU, Woodrum began working at the Tulsa City-County Library system as a branch librarian. Woodrum served in nearly every position until she became the executive director of the Tulsa City-County Library System in 1976, where she served for 32 years. Woodrum remained active throughout her lengthy career with the library. She was a part of both OLA and ALA activities, serving as president of PLA (1993–1994). Other involvements included:

- State Chairman and delegate to the first White House Conference on Libraries
- LSCA Advisory Council
- Board of Regents Library Advisory Committee
- Chairman of the OU Library School Advisory Committee
- Founder of the Tulsa Area Library Cooperative

Woodrum helped to establish Tulsa's Day Center for the Homeless as an alternative to the usage of public libraries for shelter. Woodrum was appointed to the first board of the University Center of Tulsa as well as served on the site selection committee and buildings committee for what is now the OSU-Tulsa campus.

At the time of her retirement, Woodrum made a run for State Senate, though she did not win the election.

After retiring from the library system, Woodrum went through the OSU Master Gardener Program and helped to create the Centennial Botanical Garden in Tulsa, of which she now serves as executive director.

== Awards and achievements ==
Throughout her career, Woodrum has been honored with numerous awards including:

- Oklahoma Women's Hall of Fame (1993)
- OLA Distinguished Service Award
- OLA Special Meritorious Service Award
- OLA President (1979–1980)
- PLA President (1993–1994)
- OU Library School Outstanding Alumnus
- Tulsa City-County Hall of Fame
- Tulsa Press Club's Headliner Award
- Women in Communications Newsmaker Award
- Leadership Tulsa's Paragon Award
- Pinnacle Award (2010)
- First female Senior Warden at Trinity Episcopal Church, Tulsa
- Co-founder Tulsa Botanic Garden
