= Paul Littlechief =

Kiowa-Comanche nightclub performer and comedian

- Littlechief in 1965
- Born: June 25, 1935; Lawton, Oklahoma
- Died: November 12, 1975 (aged 40); Anadarko, Oklahoma
- Other names: Chief Little Chief
- Citizenship: Kiowa Indian Tribe of Oklahoma and American

Paul Kenyon Littlechief (June 25, 1935 – November 12, 1975) was a Native American nightclub performer and comedian, one of the first to play on the Las Vegas Strip.

== Early life ==
Littlechief was born Lawton, Oklahoma to Tom Littlechief (Kiowa) and Merle Ruth Kosepeah (Comanche). His great-grandfather was a war chief known only as Littlechief (K’yád̶áisàn) who was killed by the U.S. Cavalry in 1874. His mother was Comanche and his father was Kiowa. He learned to play guitar and pedal steel when he was in his teens. He graduated from Lawton High School in 1953 and trained to become a butcher. He toured with a country band in the 1950s, billing himself as Chief Little Chief. He moved to Hollywood, California in 1956 and started playing more rockabilly-style music and recorded two songs with 4 Star Records: Come On Darlin’ and It’s for Certain (That I’m Hurtin).

== Career ==
Littlechief met his future wife, a singer who had been a former Miss Wisconsin, whose stage name was Baby Rae. The two of them developed an act with singing, dancing and fancy outfits and got a yearlong spot at the 49er Club in El Monte, California playing six nights a week. They had Indigenous-themed costumes but tried to avoid Western movie cliches and stereotypes. Littlechief was working more comedic patter into his act between their songs. The two married and had a child and moved to Nevada in 1965. They added a second woman to the act, Kim Santanya, and got a six-month residency at the Mint Hotel in Las Vegas. Santanya was later replaced by Stacy O'Hara. The act was billed as "a music comedy group featuring Paul Littlechief—the First American Indian Comedian." Littlechief did the comedic parts, occasionally veering into racy material, though also mentioning his Native background. In 1968 he and his group performed for troops in Vietnam for five weeks and then toured the Tokyo nightclub circuit.

Littlechief continued to perform, angling for better spots and got positive reviews for his performances at the Aladdin in 1970, one of the few Las Vegas venues which would headline non-white performers. He moved on to the Landmark Hotel doing three shows a night for $10,000 a week. His show moved at "a frantic pace" as he would play music with a few other musicians and the two dancers would go through "an unprecedented number of complicated costume changes" and perform the latest dances in a duo called the Watusi Warriors. A friendly fan funded his creation of an album of politically themed songs called The Real American, by Paul Littlechief and the Uprising, featuring two songs written by his oldest son Brock. He dedicated the album to Native American Studies Groups who help perpetuate Native culture.

In the early 1970s Littlechief stopped drinking alcohol and decided to not work in Las Vegas anymore, opting for more Native-specific shows.

== Death and legacy ==
Littlechief was invited to serve on the American Indian Commission on Alcoholism in Washington, D.C. He was driving there on November 12, 1975, when he stopped to visit his parents in Oklahoma whom his son was staying with. His son fatally shot him with a .22 caliber rifle and was charged with second degree murder. The district attorney fought the charge stating that the shooting happened on tribal land and it was thrown out. Littlechief's son was placed in permanent psychiatric care. The case led to the formation of a tribal police force and court system within the Kiowa Nation. Author Kliph Nesteroff wrote an entire chapter on Littlechief's life in his book about Native Americans in comedy called We Had a Little Real Estate Problem.
