= Marcia Mitchell =

American charity founder

- Born: Tulsa, Oklahoma
- Education: Drury College
- Occupation: former public school teacher
- Known for: co-founder and CEO of the Little Light House
- Spouse: Phil Mitchell

Marcia Mitchell is the founder of Little Light House, a faith-based mission to assist children with a wide range of developmental disabilities including autism, Down syndrome, and cerebral palsy. The program is not only a facility for students, but also serves as a training ground for professionals and volunteers throughout the United States and other countries who are learning to reach out to special needs children in their communities. Mitchell continues to serve as CEO of the Little Light House and published a book on her journey, Milestones and Miracles. Mitchell was inducted into the Oklahoma Women's Hall of Fame in 2011.

== Early life ==
Maria Mitchell was born in Tulsa, Oklahoma and has lived there her entire life, only spending time away when she attended Drury College, located in Springfield, Missouri. Her parents owned a chain of bakeries in the Tulsa area, so she spent a good amount of her childhood helping out in the bakery. Mitchell graduated from Edison High School in 1963. She graduated with her undergraduate degree in speech and drama from Drury in 1967. Mitchell married in July 1967 after being reacquainted with an old family friend. After three years, the two had their daughter, Missy, who was born with a rare condition leaving her legally blind. Tulsa did not have the resources at the time of Missy's birth to provide support for children with vision impairments. In 1972, Mitchell and another parent opened their own center geared toward visually impaired children, Little Light House, on October 3, 1972.

== Career ==
Mitchell and Sheryl Poole opened Little Light House in 1972, which assists children with a wide range of developmental disabilities including autism, Down syndrome, cerebral palsy and others. From its original location, Little Light House has expanded to a 22,000 square foot facility. It not only serves as a facility to its students, but also acts as a training facility for professionals and volunteers who are learning to reach out to special needs children. Little Light House has been awarded many recognitions, and was named one of President George Bush's Points of Light in 1991. In 2013, it was recognized as the state of Oklahoma's top nonprofit organization by the Oklahoma Center for Nonprofits.

In 2011, Mitchell was inducted into the Oklahoma Women's Hall of Fame for all of her work with the Little Light House and service to the community.
