= Christine Salmon =

American architect

Christine F. Salmon
- Born: Christine Fahringer; July 22, 1916; Audenried, Pennsylvania
- Died: October 10, 1985 (aged 69); Stillwater, Oklahoma
- Other names: Chris Salmon
- Occupation: architect
- Spouse: Cuthbert Salmon (m. April 22, 1946)

Christine Salmon (née Fahringer, July 22, 1916 — October 10, 1985) was an American architect and educator, originally from Pennsylvania. After teaching at Pennsylvania State University for a decade, she moved to Oklahoma in the late-1950s and taught at Oklahoma State University. She and her husband founded the architectural firm Salmon and Salmon, which focused primarily on housing and designs which accommodated people with disabilities. At the national level, she served on the National Housing Commission of the American Institute of Architects (AIA) from 1969 to 1985 and was a Fellow of the AIA. She was the first woman elected as mayor of Stillwater, Oklahoma and had previously served on the Stillwater City Commission. Salmon was inducted into the Oklahoma Women's Hall of Fame in its inaugural year, 1982.

== Biography ==
Christine Fahringer was born on July 22, 1916, in Audenried, Pennsylvania to Elizabeth (née Tench) and Walter Fahringer. She grew up in Pennsylvania and attended the George School. Fahringer continued her education earning a bachelor's degree 1941 and then in 1943, she graduated with a master's degree in architecture, both from the University of Pennsylvania. On April 22, 1946, in Hazleton, Pennsylvania, she married fellow architect F. Cuthbert Salmon and they went on to establish an architectural firm Salmon and Salmon. That same year, she began teaching as an associate professor in architecture at Pennsylvania State University. She and her husband designed primarily housing with a focus on making functional designs for physically disabled people.

Working in the Home Arts and Design Department at Penn State, Salmon stressed the importance of function, spatial aspects, environment and integration of various elements from the fields of construction, interior design and architecture to create buildings that were more practical for client needs. Rather than focusing on a specific challenge, she advocated for approaching design from a broad perspective—the exterior environment, the entire house flow, functional use of furnishings and overall comfort. She and her husband jointly co-authored several books on design beginning in the late 1950s. Around the same time, in 1959, Cuthbert accepted a position at the Oklahoma State University School of Architecture and Applied Arts and the couple relocated to Stillwater, Oklahoma. Due to nepotism restrictions, Salmon was prohibited from teaching architecture, and applied to work in the College of Home Economics, where she was hired as an associate professor in the Housing and Interior Design Department. From 1969 until 1985, Salmon served on the National Housing Commission of the American Institute of Architects and was admitted as a Fellow of the AIA for her work in creating design standards for people with physical and intellectual disabilities. In the 1970s, Salmon served as a visiting professor several different universities, including Ohio State University, Texas Tech University, the University of Iowa, the University of Nebraska–Lincoln, and at universities in Saudi Arabia and Taipei, Taiwan.

Salmon won the OSU Teacher of the Year award three times: in 1966, 1971 and 1978 From 1973 to 1978, and as chair in 1974, she served on the Stillwater Planning Commission and then from 1977 to 1982, Salmon served on the Stillwater City Council. She was inducted into the Oklahoma Women's Hall of Fame in 1982, its inaugural year. From 1982 until her death, Salmon served as the mayor of Stillwater, first woman to hold the post. In 1984, the Chris Salmon Endowed Professorship was established in her honor at OSU.

Salmon died on October 10, 1985, in Stillwater, Oklahoma after a lengthy battle with cancer. She was posthumously honored with a park, the Chris Salmon Plaza, named in her honor in Stillwater and a brick inscribed with her name being placed by a former student in the Iowa State University Plaza of Heroines.

== Selected works ==
- 1956 Hatcher residence, State College, Pennsylvania
- 1957 Woods School Child Study Treatment and Training Center, Langhorn, Pennsylvania
- 1958 Pike residence, State College, Pennsylvania
- 1964 St. Andrews Episcopalian Church, Stillwater, Oklahoma
- 1969 Lutheran Chapel, Stillwater, Oklahoma
- Starting Point II Rehabilitation Center, Stillwater, Oklahoma

== Selected publishing ==
- Salmon, F Cuthbert; Salmon, Christine F. (1959). Rehabilitation center planning: an architectural guide. University Park, Pennsylvania: Pennsylvania State University Press. OCLC 649661.
- Salmon, F Cuthbert; Salmon, Christine F. (1964). The blind; space needs for rehabilitation. Stillwater, Oklahoma: Oklahoma State University. OCLC 14548239.
- Salmon, Christine F. (1966). Sheltered Workshops: An Architectural Guide. Stillwater, Oklahoma: Oklahoma State University. OCLC 939894.
- Salmon, Christine F.; Salmon, F Cuthbert (1978). "Housing the Elderly". Journal of Home Economics. 70 (4): 23–25.

== Bibliography ==
- Gane, John F. (1970). American Architects Directory (PDF) (Third ed.). New York, New York: R.R. Bowker LLC. ISBN 0-8352-0281-X. Archived from the original (PDF) on 2016-03-04.
- Jones, Nigel R. (2005). Architecture of England, Scotland, and Wales. Westport, Connecticut: Greenwood Publishing Group. ISBN 978-0-313-31850-4.
