= Bernice Mitchell =

American county commissioner (1939–2021)

Bernice Compton Mitchell
- Born: October 27, 1939; New Orleans, Louisiana
- Died: May 8, 2021 (aged 81); Stillwater, Oklahoma
- Occupations: Former county commissioner, chair of the Oklahoma Commission on the Status of Women, and President of the Oklahoma Women’s Political Caucus
- Known for: First African American woman elected as County Commissioner in Payne County, Oklahoma
- Spouse: Earl Mitchell

Bernice Compton Mitchell (October 27, 1939 – May 8, 2021) was the first African American woman to be elected as county commissioner in Payne County, Oklahoma, and only the second woman in the state of Oklahoma to serve in this position. She served from 1986 until 1996. Mitchell also chaired the Oklahoma Commission on the Status of Women and served a time as the president of the Oklahoma Women's Political Caucus. She was inducted into the Oklahoma Women's Hall of Fame in 1995.

== Early life ==
Mitchell was born in New Orleans, Louisiana, and spent most of her childhood there. Mitchell went to an all-black school during the time that schools were still segregated. Her mother and father did not finish school, dropping out in third and fifth grade to work, yet they both strongly encouraged and required that Mitchell finish her schooling. She attended Booker T. Washington High School and was widely involved, graduating as a Top Ten Senior. Once Mitchell graduated from high school, she went to business college for two years—going at night, working in the day—to pay her own way, with the intention that once she completed that and was employed, she could pay her way through college. After completing business school, Mitchell went to work at Xavier University of Louisiana where her boyfriend attended. During his senior year, he asked her to marry him and she accepted, putting her college education on hold. From 1960 to 1966 she worked and had three children while husband Earl completed his M.S. in chemistry and PhD in biochemistry. On January 1, 1967, the young family moved to Stillwater, Oklahoma, for Earl to complete Postdoctoral Research with Professor George Waller. Earl was subsequently offered a position in the Biochemistry Department and accepted it, making the family's temporary stay in Stillwater a more permanent home.

=== Education ===
While the family lived in Stillwater, Oklahoma, Mitchell began to work on her degree. While attending Oklahoma State University, Mitchell helped create the OSU Women's Council with a group of women she had lunch with daily. Mitchell graduated from OSU in 1978 with a BA in humanistic studies and a minor in sociology.

== Career ==
After graduating, Mitchell's first job was serving as bailiff for a district judge in Stillwater, and later as his administrative assistant. Mitchell worked in the judicial system for eight years and began to receive approaches from attorneys about running for public office. Mitchell discussed the possibility with her family and after receiving support from them she decided to run for county commissioner. Her experience with the local, state and national Women's Political Caucus aided her with the knowledge of how to effectively campaign. Mitchell won the first election by 25 votes and served for two terms. She was the first African American woman to be elected as county commissioner in Payne County, Oklahoma, and only the second woman in the state of Oklahoma to serve in this position. After an attempt by the elected chair of the commission to pass a County tax for roads failed by a wide margin, Mitchell volunteered to try again. She solicited an advisory committee of diverse citizens of Payne County with a charge to develop a plan. The committee devised a plan that listed the projects, with a review committee and a five-year limit that would be extended by a vote of the citizens. The tax has been approved and extended five times and is in its sixth extension—proving that citizens in a low tax or anti-tax state will approve taxes that are clearly explained and have an evaluation process. She served from 1986 until 1996.

When Mitchell was inducted into the Oklahoma Women's Hall of Fame in 1995, she began serving on the Oklahoma Commission for the Status of Women. She also was a chair on the regional board of Action, Inc. Mitchell served on the board of directors of the National Association of Commissions for Women and was very active with her church and other community organizations. Mitchell was also the former chairman of the Payne County Democrats.

== Death ==
Bernice Mitchell died on May 8, 2021 in Stillwater.
