= Oklahoma Women's Hall of Fame =

Oklahoma Women's Hall of Fame was established in 1982 by Oklahoma Governor George Nigh "to honor Oklahoma women who are pioneers in their field or in a project that benefits Oklahoma; who have made a significant contribution to the State of Oklahoma; who serve or have served as role models to other Oklahoma women; who may be "unsung heroes," but have made a difference in the lives of Oklahomans or Americans because of their actions; who have championed other women, women's issues, or served as public policy advocates for the issues important to women; and who exemplify the Oklahoma spirit."

The Oklahoma Women's Hall of Fame is one of several events sponsored by the Oklahoma Commission on the Status of Women to support its mission, "To improve the quality of life for women, children and families in Oklahoma." Due to the COVID-19 pandemic, there were no inductees in 2020 and 2021.

== Eligibility requirements ==
- Must be a woman who has either lived in the State of Oklahoma for a major portion of her life or who is easily identified as an Oklahoman;
- Must not be a current member of the Oklahoma Commission on the Status of Women;

And shall include:

- Women who are pioneers in their field or in a project that benefits Oklahoma.
- Women who have made a significant contribution to the State of Oklahoma.
- Women who serve or have served as role models to other Oklahoma women.
- Women who may be "unsung heroes" but have made a difference in the lives of Oklahomans or Americans because of their actions.
- Women who have championed other women, women's issues, or served as public policy advocates for the issues important to women.
- Women who exemplify the Oklahoma spirit.

== Inductees ==
Oklahoma Women's Hall of Fame
Name	Image	Birth–Death	Year	Area of achievement	Ref(s)
Nancy Anthony			2024	Executive director of the Oklahoma City Community Foundation	
Marilyn Mauer Hugon			2024	Member of the board of directors of the Duncan Regional Hospital	
Edie Roodman			2024	executive director of the Oklahoma Israel Exchange and former executive director of the Jewish Federation of Oklahoma City	
Jane Semple Umsted			2024	Choctaw artist	
Crystal Stovall			2024	Co-founder of the Stovall Center for Entrepreneurship	
Molly Wehrenberg			2024	Nurse and Spanish translator	
Mo Anderson		(b. 1937)	2023		
Patricia Fennell			2023		
Ann Felton Gilliland			2023		
Donna Grabow		(b. 1945)	2023		
Kim Garrett-Funk			2023		
Cathy Keating		(b. 1950)	2023	Philanthropist, First Lady of the State of Oklahoma	
Freddye Harper Williams		(1917–2001)	2023†		
Sue Ann Arnall		(b. 1956)	2022		
Carleen Burger		(b. 1951)	2022		
Janice Dobbs			2022		
Wanda Jackson		(b. 1937)	2022		
Roseline Nsikak			2022		
Kayse Shrum		(b. 1972)	2022		
Betty McElderry		(1939–2019)	2022†		
Anna Belle Wiedemann		(b. 1931)	2022		
Helen Holmes		(1915–1997)	2019†	Journalist, historian, Women's Army Corps officer	
Noma Gurich		(b. 1952)	2019	Jurist	
Ollie Starr		(b. 1941)	2019		
Judy Love		(1937–2024)	2019	Philanthropist	
Susan Chambers			2018	OB/GYN founding partner of Lakeside Women's Hospital in Oklahoma City	
Jane Anne Jayroe		(b. 1946)	2018	Broadcaster, author, Miss Oklahoma, Miss America	
Joan Gilmore		(1927–2022)	2018	Journalist	
Willa Johnson		(1939–2022)	2018	City and county office holder	
Kay Rhoads			2018	Principal Chief of the Sac and Fox Nation	
Linda Cavanaugh		(b. 1950)	2017	Journalist	
Glenda Love			2017	Executive director of the Ronald McDonald House in Tulsa	
Pat Potts			2017	First woman to serve as President of the Oklahoma City School Board	
Meg Salyer			2017	Volunteerism	
Rhonda Walters			2017	First Lady of the State of Oklahoma; Helped create the Oklahoma Commission on the Status of Women	
Edith Kinney Gaylord		(1916– 2001)	2017†	Journalist	
LaDonna Harris		(b. 1931)	2015	Comanche activist	
Mary Mélon-Tully			2015	Newspaper publisher; The Foundation for Oklahoma City Public Schools	
Marion Paden			2015	Oklahoma Community City College	
Thelma Parks		(1923–2019)	2015	Civil rights	
Ramona Paul		(1936–2013)	2015	Education	
Patty Roloff			2015	Owner Oklahoma City 89ers	
Avis Scaramucci			2015	Entrepreneur	
Ida Blackburn		(1929–2016)	2013	Television personality, public relations	
Elaine Dodd			2013	Law enforcement	
Lou Kerr		(1937–2024)	2013	Businesswoman	
Terri Watkins		(b. 1954)	2013	Investigative journalist	
Nancy Miller			2013	Television producer	
Linda Haneborg			2013	Political activist, businesswoman	
Laura Boyd		(b. 1949)	2011	Oklahoma state representative; first woman nominee for Governor of Oklahoma	
Chloe Brown		(b. 1951)	2011	Founded The Chloe House transition home for women	
Joy Culbreath		(b. 1939)	2011	Executive Director of all Choctaw Nation Education Service	
Marcia Mitchell			2011	Founded The Little Light House faith-based mission to assist children with a wide range of developmental disabilities including autism, Down syndrome, cerebral palsy	
Ardina Moore		(1930–2022)	2011	Preservationist for the Quapaw language	
Cindy Ross		(b. 1950)	2011	First female president of Cameron University	
Kathy Taylor		(b. 1955)	2011	Mayor of Tulsa	
Helen Harrod Thompson		(b. 1931)	2011	Co-creator of the Family Shelter for Victims of Domestic Violence in Ardmore	
Rita Aragon		(b. 1947)	2009	United States Air National Guard two-star general	
Suzanne Edmondson		(b. 1945)	2009	Founder of Friends of Eddie Warrior (FEW) Foundation	
Edna Hennessee		(1919–2011)	2009	Entrepreneur	
Kim Henry			2009	First Lady of the State of Oklahoma	
Mirabeau Lamar Looney		(1871–1935)	2009†	First woman member of the Oklahoma Senate	
Susan Savage		(b. 1952)	2009	First woman mayor of Tulsa	
Carolyn Whitener		(b. 1941)	2009	Filed 1970s sexual discrimination lawsuit Craig v. Boren	
Sherri Coale		(b. 1965)	2007	Head coach of the University of Oklahoma Sooners	
Ginny Creveling		(b. 1946)	2007	Community activist	
Joe Anna Hibler		(b. 1939)	2007	First woman president of Southwestern Oklahoma State University	
Maxine Horner		(1933–2021)	2007	One of the first African American women to serve in the Oklahoma State Senate	
Kay Martin			2007	Second female superintendent to lead an Oklahoma technology center	
Terry Neese		(b. 1947)	2007	Entrepreneur, public policy strategist, women's equality advocate	
Claudia Tarrington		(1944–2003)	2007†	Political consultant	
Carolyn Thompson Taylor		(b. 1957)	2007	State representative, associate professor of political science at Rogers State University	
Della Warrior		(b. 1946)	2007	First and only woman to date to serve as the chairperson and chief executive officer for the Otoe-Missouria Tribe	
Wanda L. Bass		(1927–2008)	2005	Philanthropist	
Nancy Coats-Ashley		(b. 1939)	2005	District Court Judge for Oklahoma County	
Mary Fallin		(b. 1954)	2005	Governor of Oklahoma	
Bessie S. McColgin		(1875–1972)	2005†	First woman elected to the Oklahoma House of Representatives	
Jeanine Rhea		(b. 1938)	2005	Professor Emeritus in the Department of Management at Oklahoma State University	
Stephanie Kulp Seymour		(b. 1940)	2005	First female Chief Judge of the Tenth Circuit	
Esther Houser		(b. 1950)	2003	State Long-Term Care Ombudsman in the Aging Services Division of the Department of Human Services	
Vicki Miles-LaGrange		(b. 1953)	2003	First woman U.S. Attorney in Oklahoma	
Linda Morrissey		(b. 1953)	2003	Tulsa County District Judge	
Lynn Schusterman		(b. 1939)	2003	Philanthropist, chair emerita of the Charles and Lynn Schusterman Family Philanthropies	
Donna Shirley		(b. 1941)	2003	Aerospace engineer, head of the Mars Exploration Program in 1994	
Jari Askins		(b. 1953)	2001	Lieutenant Governor of Oklahoma	
Shirley Bellmon		(1927–2000)	2001†	First Lady of the State of Oklahoma	
Dorothy Moses DeWitty		(1926–2012)	2001	First African-American woman president of the League of Women Voters	
Sandy Garrett		(b. 1943)	2001	First woman elected Oklahoma State Superintendent of Public Instruction	
Lynn Jones		(b. 1949)	2001	Police woman, developed the first Officers’ Street Survival course in Oklahoma	
Yvonne Kauger		(b. 1937)	2001	Chief Justice of the Oklahoma Supreme Court 1997-1998	
Jill Zink Tarbel		(1924–2009)	2001	Advocate for disabled persons, trustee for the University of Tulsa	
Dana Tiger		(b. 1961)	2001	Native American artist	
Isabel Keith Baker		(1929–2019)	1997	Oklahoma State University Board of Regents	
Jessie Thatcher Bost		(1875–1963)	1997	First woman to graduate from a university in Oklahoma	
Norma Eagleton		(1934–2025)	1997	Finance and Revenue Commissioner; Board of Regents for Rogers State College	
Kay Goebel		(b. 1929)	1997	Community activist	
Ruth Hardman		(1914–2005)	1997	Philanthropist	
Beverly Horse		(1931–2010)	1997	Human rights activist	
Mazola McKerson		(1921–2014)	1997	First African-American and first female to serve on the Ardmore City Council; first African-American female mayor of Ardmore; first chair of the Oklahoma Commission on the Status of Women	
Penny Williams		(1937–2018)	1997	State legislator	
Betty Boyd		(1924–2011)	1996	Pioneer woman journalist	
Ada Lois Sipuel Fisher		(1924–1995)	1996†	Civil rights activist	
Lela Foreman		(1930–2015)	1996	Civil rights activist	
Sandy Ingraham		(b. 1947)	1996	Child Advocate of the Decade	
Lorena Males		(1909–2006)	1996	Community activist	
Bernice Shedrick		(b. 1940)	1996	Attorney, judge, state legislator	
Valree Fletcher Wynn		(1922–2021)	1996	Professor Emeritus at Cameron University; first African American to teach at Lawton High School, to teach at Cameron University, and to serve on the Board of Regents of Oklahoma Colleges.	
Nancy Feldman		(1922–2014)	1995	Civil rights activist	
Barbara J. Gardner-Anderson		(b. 1949)	1995	First woman to chair the Tulsa Chamber of Commerce	
Ruthe Blalock Jones		(b. 1939)	1995	Delaware-Shawnee Native American artist and Director Emeritus and associate professor of art at Bacone College	
Mona Salyer Lambird		(1938–1999)	1995	First woman president of the Oklahoma Bar Association and the first woman elected to the Board of Governors of the Oklahoma Bar Association	
Gloria Grace Langdon		(1927–2003)	1995	Tonkawa News publisher	
Bernice Mitchell		(1939–2021)	1995	First African American woman to be elected as County Commissioner in Payne County, Oklahoma	
Donna Nigh		(b. 1933)	1995	First Lady of the State of Oklahoma	
Marie C. Cox		(1920–2005)	1993	Founded the North American Indian Women's Association	
Anita Hill		(b. 1956)	1993	Attorney and academic	
Moscelyne Larkin		(1925–2012)	1993	Native American ballerina	
Jacqulyn Longacre		(1932–2018)	1993	Executive Director of Planned Parenthood	
Shannon Lucid		(b. 1943)	1993	Biochemist, astronaut	
Clara Luper		(1923–2011)	1993	Civic leader, civil rights activist	
Opaline Deveraux Wadkins		(1912–2000)	1993	First African American nurse to earn a master's degree from the University of Oklahoma	
Pat Woodrum		(b. 1941)	1993	Executive Director of the Tulsa City-County Library System	
Sara Ruth Cohen		(1920–1986)	1986	Activist for the arts in the Jewish community	
Vinita Cravens		(1909–1994)	1986	Stage productions promoter	
Rubye Hibler Hall		(1912–2003)	1986	First African-American appointed to the State Regents for Higher Education	
Elizabeth Ann McCurdy Holmes		(1927–1983)	1986†	Continuing Education and Public Service at the University of Oklahoma	
Grace Elizabeth Hudlin		(1908–1995)	1986	Political activist and first woman to head an electric cooperative in Oklahoma	
Wilma Mankiller		(1945–2010)	1986	First woman elected chief of the Cherokees	
Edna Mae Phelps		(1920–2001)	1986	First woman to serve on the Oklahoma State Election Board	
Evelyn La Rue Pittman		(1910–1992)	1986	Author, composer, choral director, producer, and music educator	
Mae Boren Axton		(1914–1997)	1985	The woman who wrote Heartbreak Hotel; songwriter, promoter, mother of Hoyt Axton	
June Tompkins Benson		(1915–1981)	1985†	First woman mayor in Oklahoma	
Pam Olson		(b. 1949)	1985	News journalist, CNN White House correspondent	
Betty Durham Price		(1931–2023)	1985	Visual arts preservationist	
Bertha Frank Teague		(1898–1991)	1985	Basketball coach; She established the first girls' basketball clinic in the Southwest	
Angie Debo		(1890–1988)	1984	Historian who focused on Native Americans	
Jeane Kirkpatrick		(1926–2006)	1984	Professor, diplomat, political activist	
Jewell Russell Mann		(1903–1987)	1984	Feminist activist who was instrumental in amending the state constitution to allow women to hold elective office in Oklahoma	
Zella J. Patterson		(1909–1986)	1984	Head of the Home Economics Department at Langston University	
Zelia N. Breaux		(1880–1956)	1983†	Organized the first music department at Oklahoma's Langston University and the school's first orchestra	
Kate Frank		(1890–1982)	1983†	First woman president of the Oklahoma Education Association	
Leona Mitchell		(b. 1949)	1983	African-American and Chickasaw operatic soprano	
Jean Pitts		(b. 1945)	1983	Cardiovascular surgeon and medical researcher	
Juanita Stout		(1919–1998)	1983	First African-American woman elected to any judgeship in the United States and the first to serve on the Supreme Court of any state	
Alma Wilson		(1917–1999)	1983	First woman to serve on the Oklahoma Supreme Court and its first woman as chief justice,	
Hannah Diggs Atkins		(1923–2010)	1982	First African-American woman elected to the Oklahoma House of Representatives (1968–1980)	
Kate Barnard		(1875–1930)	1982†	First woman elected to statewide office by a male-only electorate	
June Brooks		(1924–2010)	1982	Oil lobbyist	
Gloria Stewart Farley		(1916–2006)	1982	Author, historian	
Aloysius Larch-Miller		(1886–1920)	1982†	Suffragist	
Susan Ryan Peters		(1873–1965)	1982†	Founded the Kiowa Indian School of Art	
Christine Salmon		(1916–1985)	1982	Architect	
Edyth Thomas Wallace		(1880–1975)	1982†	Newspaper columnist and radio disc jockey	

†Posthumously
