= Joy Culbreath =

American educator and advocate of education enhancement

- Born: 1939 (age 86–87); Boggy Depot, Oklahoma
- Education: Southeastern Oklahoma State University
- Occupations: former educator and administrator
- Known for: Former Executive Director of Education for the Choctaw Nation of Oklahoma
- Spouse: Alton Culbreath

Joy Culbreath is an American former educator and advocate of education enhancement. Culbreath worked with Upward Bound students during her twenty-seven year career with alma mater, Southeastern Oklahoma State University. She later worked for the Choctaw Nation of Oklahoma, establishing an adult education program and later becoming the executive director of all education. Culbreath established a Choctaw language education and preservation department that has since allowed the language to be state certified and taught in public schools, on college campuses for credit, and on the internet. She served the Choctaw Nation for twenty-two years until retirement. In 2010 she was appointed by President Obama to serve on the No Child Left Behind Negotiated Rulemaking Committee and was inducted into the Oklahoma Women's Hall of Fame the following year.

== Early life ==
Culbreath was born at the end of the Great Depression in Boggy Depot, Oklahoma. In 1942, when she was only three years old, her family moved to Lubbock, Texas looking for work. Culbreath graduated from Tom S. Lubbock High School in 1957, a year after classmate and later Rock-n-Roll legend, Buddy Holly. The following December, Culbreath was married to Durant, Oklahoma native, Alton Culbreath. The young couple moved to Durant, where they have lived ever since. Within four years, Culbreath had given birth to three daughters which put a hold on her education. After carefully planning out the finances and timing, Culbreath started at Southeastern Oklahoma State University where she eventually earned three separate master's degrees in school counseling, administration, and general education.

== Career ==
In 1967, Culbreath went to work at her alma mater, Southeastern Oklahoma State University, and stayed with them for twenty-seven years. While at SOSU, Culbreath taught in the business education department and was involved with a large amount of advisory counseling with students. Culbreath is most known at SOSU for her work with Upward Bound students, a Federal TRIO program that provides support to participants in their preparation for college entrance. In 1993, Culbreath retired with SOSU on a Friday and started working for the Choctaw Nation of Oklahoma the following Monday.

=== Choctaw Nation of Oklahoma ===
The Choctaw Nation had very few education programs at the time and Culbreath joined them to establish an adult education program. She was also challenged to build the Nation a language education and preservation department in 1997, which she took on with full force. With her guidance, the Choctaw language is now state certified and taught in public schools, on college campuses for credit, and on the internet. Culbreath was later appointed as the executive director of education for the Choctaw Nation. She retired after serving in various roles for twenty-two years.

In 2010, Culbreath was appointed by President Barack Obama to on the No Child Left Behind Negotiated Rulemaking Committee. The following year in 2011, she was inducted into the Oklahoma Women's Hall of Fame. She was also recognized by the Oklahoma State Board of Regents with the “Champion for Student Success” award. In 2015, The Kiamichi Technology Center s' Board of Education selected Culbreath to fill the unexpired term of Zone 5.
