= Edison Preparatory School =

Coordinates: 36.103356°N 95.947064°W

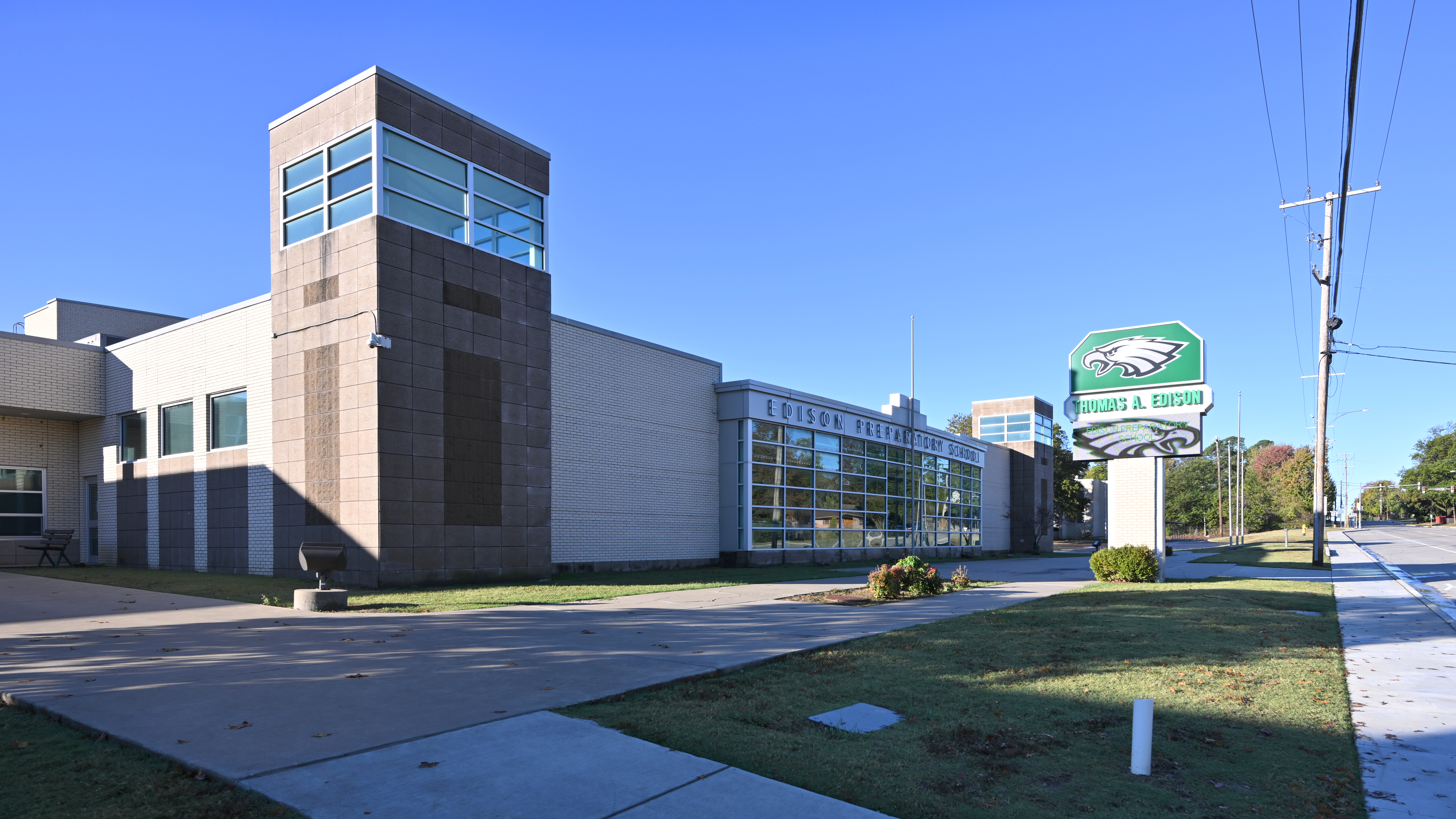
- 2906 East 41st Street; Tulsa, Oklahoma 74105; United States

Information
- Type: Public
- Established: 1954
- School district: Tulsa Public Schools
- Principal: Timothy Maxeiner
- Enrollment: 1,089 in grades 9-12 (2023-2024)
- Colors: Kelly green and eggshell white
- Mascot: Eagle
- Information: (918) 746-8500
- Grades: 6-12
- Website: Edison Eagles

Thomas Edison Preparatory School is a public school located in midtown Tulsa, Oklahoma, United States, serving students from 6th grade to 12th grade. It is a part of Tulsa Public Schools.

== Overview ==
The school was recently ranked by Newsweek as the #467 best high school in the nation, #2 in Tulsa, and #3 in Oklahoma.

In 2005, 92 percent of Edison seniors graduated.

Edison has more than 30 clubs and organizations for the estimated 2,220 students enrolled.

The school recently became a "Program of Choice" (replacing the former program, "Magnet Schools").

The school offers a wide variety of classes including three foreign languages (French, Spanish, Chinese). It also offers classes in Music, Leadership, and Drama.

The school opened in 1956 on a 44-acre (180,000 m^{2}) lot on 41st Street between Harvard and Lewis.

== Extracurricular activities ==
Extracurricular activities include marching band and choir, which have made it to the finals at contests such as Oologah and Bixby.

== Notable alumni ==
- Tom Adelson, state senator
- Cindy Chupack, screenwriter and film director, winner of three Golden Globes and two Emmys
- Will Creekmore, basketball player
- Larry Drake, actor, multiple Emmy winner
- Mike Fanning, NFL defensive lineman, 10 years with Los Angeles Rams, Notre Dame '73 NCAA Football National Champions
- Bill Goldberg (born 1966), professional NFL football player, undefeated wrestler, and actor
- Jason Graae, musical-theater actor
- Bill Hader, actor/comedian
- Tom Hankins, basketball coach
- William F. Martin, U.S. deputy secretary of energy
- Marcia Mitchell, co-founder and executive director of the Little Lighthouse; author of Milestones & Miracles
- Kevin Pritchard, basketball player, NBA president of Basketball Operations, Indiana Pacers
- Carl Radle, bass guitarist for Derek and the Dominos
- Nancy Riley, state senator
- Susan Savage, former mayor of Tulsa
- Phil Seymour, musician
- Ted Shackelford, actor
- Spencer Tillman, All-American running back, Oklahoma; TV sports analyst
- Jeanne Tripplehorn, actress
- Dwight Twilley, musician
