= Mazola McKerson =

American politician (1921–2014)

Mazola Holman McKerson
- Born: Mazola Holman; January 10, 1921; Bluff, Oklahoma
- Died: October 18, 2014 (aged 93)
- Occupation: Owner of The Gourmet Restaurant in Ardmore, Oklahoma
- Known for: First African-American female mayor of Ardmore, Oklahoma
- Spouse: Alfred Mckerson (died August 04, 2010)

Mazola McKerson (January 10, 1921 – October 18, 2014) was an American politician. In 1977 she was elected as an Ardmore City Commissioner, making her not only the first African-American, but also the first woman to serve on the City Council. Only two years later, McKerson became the first African-American female mayor of Ardmore, Oklahoma, as well as the first woman in the United States to serve as mayor of a city of more than 30,000 people. McKerson was also the first chairperson of the Governor's Commission on the Status of Women. Aside from her public influence, McKerson owned and operated The Gourmet Restaurant in Ardmore from 1962 to 1997, the product of her home-based catering company that she started in 1946.

== Early life ==
Mazola Holman McKerson was born on January 10, 1921, to parents Daisy Turner and Calvin Holman in Bluff, Oklahoma, a small community located near Hugo, Oklahoma. After the early death of her father, McKerson moved to Ardmore, Oklahoma in 1929 with her mother's sister, Pearl May, who raised Mazola as her own daughter. Her aunt was a maid for Marie Smith, part of a wealthy Ardmoreite family. Through helping her aunt with her chores, McKerson learned to cook which led to her later success in the food business.

On July 30, 1938, McKerson married her late husband, Alfred McKerson, and the couple struggled financially for the first years of their marriage. Soon one of McKerson's clients, Abby Reisen, daughter of the Daily Ardmoreite owner John Reisen, convinced her to start a catering business out of her home.

=== Career ===
Her catering service eventually became so successful over the next ten years that she eventually had to transform her business into a restaurant. In 1962, McKerson purchased the location for The Gourmet restaurant which earned the reputation and clientele for being the finest dining establishment in Ardmore and remained in full capacity until 1994 when Mazola retired for the first time.

Through her involvement with the PTA, McKerson was approached about running for city council. All expenses were paid for by her community and she was elected, making her the first African-American as well as the first woman to serve on the city council in 1977. Although she dealt with some prejudice, McKerson's ownership of the restaurant made her well known and respected throughout Ardmore.

=== Mayor of Ardmore, Oklahoma ===
In 1979, McKerson was elected as Ardmore's mayor, making her the first African-American woman to serve in this position as well as the first woman in the United States to serve as mayor of a city of more than 30,000 people. She was later appointed to the Commission on the Status of Women by former Oklahoma governor George Nigh. McKerson also served as president of the Ladies of Action Club and was inducted into the Oklahoma Women's Hall of Fame in 1997.

== Awards and achievements ==
McKerson's achievements were recognized with numerous awards including:

- Selected as Woman of the Year by the YWCA in 1976
- Served as Chairman of the Status of Women under the former Oklahoma Governor George Nigh
- Served as a delegate to represent Ardmore on the White House Conference of Family Living in Washington, D. C.
- Served on the board of directors for the Ardmore Chamber of Commerce
- Served on the Board of Directors of Higher Education in the state of Oklahoma and was elected chairman, 1986–88
- Selected as one of the Women of the Year in 1996-1997
- Selected as Spokesperson for the national recognition given to Ardmore for being an All American City at the ceremony in Chicago
- Served on the board of directors and elected Chairman of the Southwestern Museum in Ardmore
- Member of the Women's Advisory Committee for Mercy Memorial Hospital in Ardmore
- Named Woman of the Year at the Pioneer Woman Museum in 1984
