= Houser =

Houser is a surname. Notable people with the surname include:

- Adrian Houser (born 1993), American baseball player
- Allan Houser (1914–1994), American artist
- Barry L. Houser (born 1977), American conductor
- Brad Houser (born 1960), American musician
- Bud Houser (1901–1994), American field athlete
- Dan Houser, English video game producer
- Esther Houser, American social worker from Oklahoma
- Frederick W. Houser, American judge, father of Frederick F. Houser
- Frederick F. Houser (1905–1989), American politician
- George Houser (1916–2015), American civil rights activist
- Harold Houser (1897–1981), American admiral and Governor of American Samoa
- Hubert Houser (born 1942), American politician
- Jerry Houser (born 1952), American actor
- John Russell Houser (1955–2015), perpetrator of the 2015 Lafayette shooting
- John Sherrill Houser (1935–2018), American sculptor and painter
- John Wesley Houser, Jr. (born 1935), American football player
- Kevin Houser (born 1977), American football player
- Michael Houser (1962–2002), American musician
- Norm Houser (1915–1996), American racecar driver
- Randy Houser (born 1975), country music singer-songwriter
- Sam Houser (born 1971), English computer game producer and developer
- Thane Houser (1891–1967), American racecar driver
- William D. Houser (1921–2012), American Navy officer and telecommunications executive

== See also ==
- Hooser, a surname
- Howser (disambiguation), including people with the surname
- Hawser, a thick rope in nautical terminology
