= Rubye Hibler Hall =

American educator (1912–2003)

- Photograph of Rubye M. Hibler and Ira Hall during their graduation from Langston University, Langston, OK, c. 1932.
- Born: Rubye Maie Hibler; February 27, 1912; Eufaula, Oklahoma
- Died: November 9, 2003 (aged 91)
- Education: Langston University, University of Oklahoma
- Occupation: Educator
- Spouse: Ira DeVoyd Hall

Rubye Hibler Hall (1912–2003) was an American educator. She was the first African-American appointed to the Oklahoma State Regents for Higher Education.

== Biography ==
Hall née Hibler was born on February 27, 1912, in Eufaula, Oklahoma. She married Ira DeVoyd Hall in 1930. She attended Langston University, graduating in 1932. In 1959 she received her master of arts degree from the University of Oklahoma. Most of her career was spent in the Oklahoma public school system as a teacher, and other counseling positions.

Hall was appointed by governor David Hall to the Oklahoma State Regents for Higher Education in 1974, becoming the first African American person appointed to that position. She served as chairwoman from 1978 through 1979.

Hall was a member of the Alpha Kappa Alpha sorority, the Langston University National Alumni Association, The Links, Incorporated (Oklahoma City Chapter), and the National Association of Colored Women's Clubs. She was inducted into several halls of fame including the Oklahoma Women's Hall of Fame in 1986 and the Oklahoma Higher Education Hall of Fame in 1998. She and her husband Ira were co-founders of the Oklahoma City Urban League. Hall was the founder of the mentoring organization, the National Grandparents Academy.

Hall died on November 9, 2003.

== Legacy ==
The Ira D. Hall and Rubye Hibler Hall Endowed Lecture Series was established at Langston University's School of Education and Behavioral Sciences in 2003.
