= Kay Goebel =

American psychologist (1929–2026)

- Born: Alice Kathrine Larsen; October 30, 1929; Glendive, Montana, U.S.
- Died: August 25, 2026 (aged 96); Oklahoma City, Oklahoma, U.S.
- Education: Oregon State University, Oklahoma City University, University of Oklahoma
- Occupation: Counseling psychologist
- Known for: Associate professor at the University of Oklahoma Health Sciences Center, former president of the Arts Council of Oklahoma City
- Spouse: Harry Goebel

Alice Kathrine Goebel (née Larsen; October 30, 1929 – August 25, 2026) was an American counseling psychologist in Oklahoma City. She served as president of the Arts Council of Oklahoma City, and later six years on the Oklahoma Arts Council, four of those years as chair. Goebel was inducted into the Oklahoma Women's Hall of Fame in 1997 among many other awards and honors over the course of her career.

== Early life ==
Alice Kathrine Larsen was born in Glendive, Montana on October 30, 1929, and grew up on her parents' wheat and cattle ranch, where she developed a love of horseback riding. When she was 11 years old, Goebel and her family moved to Boise, Idaho where her mother's family lived. Goebel attended a very small high school with a graduating class of 17. After high school, Goebel attended a junior college that later became Boise State University. She transferred to and earned her first degree in food and nutrition from Oregon State University.

She married her husband, Harry, in 1951. He was in the oil business, and the young couple moved around a lot early in their marriage. During the first seven years of their marriage, they had five children and eventually moved south in the mid-1950s. In 1967, the family moved to Oklahoma City where they have lived ever since. Goebel went on to earn her master's degree in teaching and a teaching certificate from Oklahoma City University. She got a job teaching at the school of her youngest son. Goebel soon after earned her PhD in counseling psychology from the University of Oklahoma.

== Career ==
In January 1972, Goebel went into private practice and has done that ever since.

=== Community involvement ===
Goebel began her volunteer work with the Arts Council by selling popcorn at the Arts Festival and began to work her way up the Festival chain. She eventually became a board member and later served on the executive committee of the Arts Council. Former governor David Walters appointed Goebel to the State Arts Council. After about a year, Goebel became President of the Board, or Chairman of that Council, where she served for four years. Other ways in which Goebel has served her community include serving on:

- Mid-America Arts Alliance Board of Directors
- Oklahoma Academy Board of Directors
- Girl Scouts of Western Oklahoma Board of Directors
- Oklahoma Arts Institute Board of Directors
- Allied Arts
- Calm Waters Center for Children and Families Board of Directors

== Death ==
Goebel died in Oklahoma City on August 25, 2026, at the age of 96.

== Awards and honors ==
Goebel has been honored with many awards for her work in Oklahoma City. Some of these awards and honors include:

- Volunteer Fundraiser of the Year by the Association of Professional Fundraisers (2005)
- Key Contributor Award from The Oklahoma Academy (2004)
- Planned Parenthood of Central Oklahoma Outstanding Board Service Award (2002)
- Name one of the Twenty Most Influential Women in Oklahoma by Oklahoma Family Magazine (2001)
- Governor's Arts Award (1996)
- Inducted into the Oklahoma Women's Hall of Fame (1997)
