= Isabel Keith Baker =

American educator (1929–2019)

- Born: May 27, 1929
- Died: September 2, 2019 (aged 90)
- Education: Northeastern State University, Oklahoma State University
- Occupation: Educator
- Spouse: Tim Baker

Dr. Isabel Keith Baker (May 27, 1929 – September 2, 2019) was a former educator in the U.S. state of Oklahoma. Throughout her 43 years as an educator, Baker taught in several Oklahoma schools, retiring as Professor Emeritus from Northeastern State University in 1994. Baker served on the Oklahoma State University A&M Board of Regents from 1991 until 1999. She played a major role in the renovation of Willard Hall, the home of OSU's College of Education. During her career and throughout her life, Baker has been recognized as a champion of gender equity. In the 1980s, Baker ran for Congress and was defeated by Republican candidate, Tom Coburn.

== Early life ==
Isabel Keith was born in Oklahoma in 1929, the daughter of two teachers. She attended school in the Tahlequah area and graduated from high school when she was only sixteen years old. During the Depression her family became very close and had to rely on one another to survive. Baker enjoyed riding horses and performing music with her family during her childhood. Her father eventually stopped teaching and worked for a construction company, sending checks back to his family, in order to provide for them better. Baker had one sister and one brother, both older and since deceased.

Her future husband, Tim Baker, lived down the road from her family's farm and once he returned from the war, the two attended Northeastern State University, taking many of the same classes. Once they married, Baker became pregnant while still in college, and a rule existed at the time that stated pregnant women could not finish their internships. She hid her pregnancy from her supervisors and graduated without any repercussions. Baker graduated with three degrees, one in home economics, speech and drama, and education. She later became a reading specialist.

== Career ==
Baker entered the workforce while continuing to take night classes from Oklahoma State University for her master's degree. Both Baker and her husband worked on earning their master's degrees together in order to earn a larger income and to have the ability to provide for their children. In 1954, Baker received her degree and began to teach, later becoming the principal and superintendent of schools. The couple taught in Sapulpa and Shidler before returning to Tahlequah to take care of Mr. Baker's ailing father. They stayed in Tahlequah until they left to work at Morehead State University. The university offered Baker a position that paid double her salary in Oklahoma, so she accepted.

Baker and her husband worked there for three years until they were offered sabbaticals to return to Oklahoma and finish their doctorates. Once they earned their degrees, they returned to Morehead State to pay them back. Eventually they returned to Oklahoma where Baker was offered a position at Oklahoma State University and also served as project coordinator for the OSU Teacher Corps Project.

=== OSU A&M Board of Regents ===
Baker was named to the OSU A&M Board of Regents and served for eight years. She was involved with creating an alternative admissions program for OSU that allowed opportunities for students to attend the university even in their ACT score was not high enough. The program would accept students that took summer school and made above a "B" average. Baker served as chairwoman several times.

=== Renovation of Willard Hall ===
Baker was concerned with getting OSU's College of Education to pass the NCATE (National Council for Accreditation of Teacher Education) standards. She found that the reason for their failure to pass was not due to the excellence of the professors or programs, but instead that the college did not have a centrally located place for the dean, faculty, and head of departments. Instead, they were scattered in numerous places across campus. The committee searched the campus and eventually set out to restore Willard, previously a girl's dorm titled WOW (Women of Willard). Since renovating Willard and re-purposing the building as the home for the College of Education, the program has passed NCATE standards without trouble.

After her time serving with the OSU A&M Board of Regents, Baker had the opportunity to return to Northeastern State University where she eventually retired as Professor Emeritus in 1994.

=== Awards and recognition ===
Baker's career and achievements have received numerous awards throughout the years, including:

- Oklahoma Women's Hall of Fame inductee (1997)
- Oklahoma Mother of the Year (1998)
- OSU's College of Education Hall of Fame inductee (2005)
- NSU's President's Award for Community Service (2006)
- NSU Centurion (2010)
