= Oklahoma Library Association =

Non-profit organization that promotes libraries

- Abbreviation: OLA
- Formation: 1907
- Type: Non-profit
- President: Michael Hull
- Website: OLA Website

The Oklahoma Library Association (OLA) is a non-profit organization that promotes libraries and library services and provides professional development for library personnel in the state of Oklahoma. OLA is a chapter of both the American Library Association and the Mountain Plains Library Association. OLA hosts workshops throughout the year and holds an Annual Conference. OLA is the official sponsor of the Sequoyah Book Award, the third oldest U.S. state children's choice award.

== History ==
OLA was formed on May 16, 1907 by a small group of librarians from the University of Oklahoma and nearby normal schools as well as public libraries. The meeting was hosted by the now-defunct Carnegie Library in downtown Oklahoma City. These librarians were interested in forming a statewide library association to ensure the "statewide extension of tax-supported library service" and "to explore a more economical way of transporting...books."

OLA has sponsored the Read Y'all celebrity poster literacy campaign and the Mildred Laughlin Festival of Books. OLA used to publish a newsletter called Oklahoma Librarian, which ceased in 2018.

== Notable Members ==
- Ruth Brown
- Ruby Canton, daughter of lawman and former outlaw Frank M. Canton
- Milton J. Ferguson
- Edmon Low
- Allie Beth Martin
- Lotsee Patterson
- Pat Woodrum

== See also ==
- List of libraries in the United States
