= Sandy Ingraham =

American attorney and advocate

- Born: 1947 (age 78–79); California
- Education: University of Central Oklahoma, University of Oklahoma
- Occupations: social policy consultant and attorney
- Known for: author of Kids Count

Sandy Ingraham is a current social policy consultant and attorney at Ingraham & Associates law firm in McLoud, Oklahoma. Ingraham is a former lobbyist at the Oklahoma State Capitol for Neighborhood Services Organization and has worked on programs such as SoonerStart and writes the annual data book Kids Count. She was inducted into the Oklahoma Women's Hall of Fame in 1996 for her advocacy work and achievements.

== Early life ==
Sandy Ingraham was born in Northern California in 1947. Her family moved around frequently due to her father's career in the Air force. Ingraham began her high school education in California, spent a brief time in upstate New York, and finally graduated from high school in Tripoli, Libya. On her journey back to California, Ingraham stopped for a time in Oklahoma where her mother was born and ended up staying permanently. She spent around seven years earning two undergraduate degrees in English Literature and Philosophy at Central State College (now University of Central Oklahoma). During her undergraduate years, Ingraham sided strongly with the Vietnam War opposition and protested openly with other students. She later spent two years earning a master's degree in Social Work from the University of Oklahoma. In her mid forties, Ingraham returned to the University of Oklahoma to earn her Juris Doctor.

== Career ==
After earning her master's degree in Social Work, Ingraham began her professional career as a lobbyist at the Oklahoma State Capitol for Neighborhood Services Organization. Some of the key issues Ingraham championed while working at the capitol include the Good Faith Donor Bill. She also worked on a bill that allowed non-profit organizations to be able to rent HUD foreclosed homes for a dollar a year provided they house homeless people in them. When Ingraham stopped lobbying full-time, she returned to the University of Oklahoma to earn her Juris Doctor. She currently practices law as an attorney at Ingraham & Associates PLLC and also serves as a social policy consultant.

Ingraham was on the initial Board of the Oklahoma Women's Foundation. In 1993, she was named Child Advocate of the Decade. Three years later in 1996, Ingraham was inducted into the Oklahoma Women's Hall of Fame.
