= Edna Miller Hennessee =

American businesswoman

- Born: March 24, 1919; Ryan, Oklahoma
- Died: March 24, 2011 (aged 92)
- Known for: Founder of Cosmetic Specialty Labs; first woman inducted into Oklahoma Commerce and Industry Hall of Fame; member of the Oklahoma Women's Hall of Fame

Edna Miller Hennessee (March 24, 1919 – March 24, 2011) was an American businesswoman from the U.S. state of Oklahoma who founded Cosmetic Specialty Labs.

== Early life and family ==
Edna Miller Hennessee was born on March 24, 1919, to Henry and Elsie Miller in Ryan, Oklahoma. She attended Union High School and was the valedictorian in 1936. In 1939 she married Lloyd Roy Hennessee and moved to Lawton, Oklahoma. She had two children.

== Career ==
In 1944, Hennessee purchased a Merle Norman franchise. In 1950, she opened the Hennessee Family Center beauty salon in Lawton. In 1973, she started her company, Cosmetic Specialty Labs. In 1982, she founded Dream Valley Farm as a subsidiary of Cosmetic Specialty Labs to grow aloe vera plants. By the time of her death, her business sold to clients in every state and over 30 countries. She was appointed to the state vocational-technology board in 1989 by Gov. Henry Bellmon. Governor David Walters appointed her to the Oklahoma Commission for the Advancement of Science and Technology and Frank Keating named her to the Board of Vocational and Technical Education in 1995.

== Death and legacy ==
She died on March 24, 2011. She was the first woman inducted into the Oklahoma Commerce and Industry Hall of Fame in 1993 and was inducted into the Oklahoma Women's Hall of Fame in 2009. Part of Oklahoma State Highway 58 was named the Edna Hennessee Memorial Highway in her honor in 2014. As of 2019, Cosmetic Specialty Labs was owned by her granddaughter, Jennifer Ellis.
