= Linda Morrissey =

American judge

- Born: March 27, 1953; Washington, D.C.
- Education: Oklahoma State University, University of Oklahoma College of Law
- Occupation: Tulsa County District Judge

Linda Morrissey is a Tulsa County district judge. During her time as a judge, Morrissey has influenced the addition of the first courtroom in Tulsa County that dealt strictly with child support, as well as the Families in Transition Plan that removes disputing families from the courtroom and gives them an audience with mediators. In 2003, Morrissey was inducted into the Oklahoma Women's Hall of Fame for her contributions to the Tulsa County judicial system.

== Early life ==
Linda Morrissey was born in Washington D.C., on March 27, 1953. When she was one year old, her family moved to Oklahoma and she spent the majority of her childhood on her grandmother's farm in Haskell, Oklahoma. Morrissey graduated from high school in Tulsa, Oklahoma. After high school, Morrissey attended Oklahoma State University where she earned a bachelor's degree in teaching and a master's in counseling in 1977. While working on her master's at OSU, Morrissey served on the Academic Appeals Board, an opportunity from which she decided to pursue a career in law rather than teaching. Immediately after, she went to the University of Oklahoma where she earned her Juris Doctor in 1980.

== Career ==
Toward the beginning of 1981, Morrissey went to work as a lawyer for Cities Service Oil Company. For about ten years, Morrissey worked as an oil and gas lawyer. She later went to work for the Resolution Trust Corporation. When they closed their Tulsa office, Morrissey went to work at the Court of Civil Appeals. She worked as a staff attorney for justice Danny Bordeaux. After she worked for the Court of Civil Appeals for three years, Morrissey applied for a position on the district court as a special judge. In 1995, Morrissey was selected as a special judge. In this position Morrissey presides over the Felony Criminal Docket, a Drug Court Docket, a Mental Health Docket, a Domestic Violence Docket, and the Child Support Enforcement Docket. During her time as a judge, Morrissey has influenced the addition of the first courtroom in Tulsa County that dealt strictly with child support, as well as the Families in Transition Plan that removes disputing families from the courtroom and gives them an audience with mediators.

=== Awards ===
For her work in the Tulsa County judicial system, Morrissey has been awarded:

- Judge of the Year by the National Child Support Enforcement Association (1997)
- Pinnacle Award for public service (1997)
- "A Rising Star" by Tulsa People (1997)
- President's Award from the Tulsa County Bar Association (1998)
- Newsmaker Award Recipient (1999)
- Inductee in the Oklahoma Women's Hall of Fame (2003)
