= Jacqulyn Longacre =

American advocate for women's and rural health

Jacqulyn Clara Longacre
- Born: November 2, 1932; Robeline, Louisiana
- Died: October 30, 2018 (aged 85)
- Education: Oklahoma State University, University of Oklahoma
- Occupation: social work
- Known for: director of Planned Parenthood of Tulsa

Jacqulyn Clara "Jackie" Longacre (November 2, 1932 – October 30, 2018) was the executive director of Planned Parenthood in Tulsa, Oklahoma. In the eighteen years she was the director of the Tulsa campus, they grew from serving 1,600 patients to serving over 10,000 patients in a single year and were awarded the Fairchild Award, the highest award available for being a quality service affiliate. Longacre played a vital part in establishing Reproductive Services in Tulsa as well as Tulsa County Perinatal Coalition. In 1993, she was inducted in the Oklahoma Women’s Hall of Fame.

== Early life ==
Jackie Longacre was born in Robeline, Louisiana, but was raised primarily in Wewoka, Oklahoma. Her family moved around several times because of her father's work in the oilfield. She attended several rural schools during her childhood that played a key role in her early character development. Eventually, Longacre graduated from Wewoka High School. Longacre continued her education at Oklahoma A&M (now Oklahoma State University) due to a scholarship she received through the Extension Service. While in college she held several jobs, including running the dorm elevator, working in the kitchen, and finally in the Dean of the Graduate School's office. She majored in accounting and economics and completed her degrees in four years.

== Career ==
Longacre applied for a job as an oil company accountant in Venezuela, but was denied as a single woman. She took a caseworker exam and went to work for Seminole County Department of Welfare, moving in 1957, to the Department of Human Services in Tulsa County. While working on her graduate degree at the University of Oklahoma, Longacre was employed in the Social Work Department of Griffin Memorial Hospital in Norman. After graduating with her master's degree, Longacre moved to Tulsa, working at the Child Welfare Division of the Department of Human Services and later took over the Child Protective Unit in Tulsa County. In 1969, Longacre became the Director of Planned Parenthood in Tulsa, where she worked for eighteen years. During her tenure, Tulsa’s Planned Parenthood grew from serving 1,600 patients to serving over 10,000 patients in a single year and was awarded the Fairchild Award, the highest award available for quality service in the industry. Longacre was a key figure in the development of reproductive health services for Tulsa and helped establish the Tulsa County Perinatal Coalition, which was founded in 1987 to address a crisis occurring in women's health at that time—lack of services for low-income women, high risk and high infant mortality due to inadequate health care, and inadequate education. She moved to Dallas for a short period of time, working with the Planned Parenthood located there.

Longacre returned to Oklahoma to direct the Area Health Education Center in Enid, Oklahoma and focused on health education. Many of the programs her agency sponsored worked on teen pregnancy issues, suicide reduction, family planning, reducing the risks of STDs, AIDs education and other issues. In 1992, when a grant was given to establish a rural health service, she founded Rural Health Projects (RHP). In a 2005 book, Troubled Fields: Men, Emotions, and the Crisis in American Farming by Eric Ramirez-Ferrero, the author praised Longacre's assistance and the RHP for its services to the rural health needs of Oklahomas in the northwestern part of the state. After, Longacre went to work for the State Health Department helping to improve the WIC program, from which she retired in 1996.

Longacre was inducted into the Oklahoma Women's Hall of Fame in 1993 for her advocacy on women's and rural health issues. In 2015, a play honoring Longacre and 13 other Oklahoma women who were "courageous, tenacious, persistent and uppity" entitled Oklahoma Women with True Grit was premiered at the Stillwater Public Library.
