= Mona Salyer Lambird =

American lawyer

- Born: Mona Sue Salyer; July 19, 1938; Oklahoma City, Oklahoma
- Died: August 25, 1999 (aged 61); Çankırı, Turkey
- Education: Wellesley College; University of Maryland School of Law
- Occupation: attorney
- Years active: 1964-1999
- Known for: first woman president of the Oklahoma Bar Association
- Spouse: Perry Albert Lambird (m. 1960)

Mona Salyer Lambird (1938–1999) was an Oklahoma lawyer who became the first woman president of the Oklahoma Bar Association and the first woman elected to the Board of Governors of the Oklahoma Bar Association. She was inducted into the Oklahoma Women's Hall of Fame in 1995.

== Biography ==
Mona Sue Salyer was born on July 19, 1938, in Oklahoma City, Oklahoma, to Pauline and B.M. Salyer, Jr. She pursued an undergraduate degree in Economics graduating with honors in 1960 from Wellesley College. That same year, she married Perry Albert Lambird (1960-1999). The couple moved to Baltimore and Lambird enrolled in the University of Maryland School of Law. During her schooling, she was the Editor of the Maryland Law Review. She graduated in 1963, with honors, earning the Elizabeth Maxwell Carroll Chestnut Prize as a member of the Order of the Coif.

== Career ==
After graduation, she worked in the US Attorney's Office in the Justice Department in Washington, D.C. In 1971, Lambird joined Andrews, Davis, Legg, Bixler, Milsten and Price, where she later became partner in 1977. Her practice concerned general civil, state and federal litigation with a focus on employment law disputes with administrative agencies and on behalf of management. In 1989, she was honored as The Journal Record′s Corporate Woman of the Year. That same year, she was elected as the first woman to head the Oklahoma County Bar Association, serving as vice president from 1989 to 1990 and president from 1990 to 1991. From 1992 to 1994 she was elected as the first woman to serve on the Board of Governors of the Oklahoma Bar and in 1996, Lambird was sworn in as the first woman president of the Oklahoma Bar Association. She was inducted into the Oklahoma Women's Hall of Fame in 1995 and in 1996, was honored with the Wall of Fame Humanitarian Award from the Oklahoma City Public Schools Foundation. In 1998, the Spotlight Award, given annually to five Oklahoma women of distinction in the legal profession, was renamed as the Mona Salyer Lambird Spotlight Award by the Oklahoma Bar Association.

Lambird, her husband and a daughter, Jennifer, were killed in an automobile accident while on vacation in Çankırı, Turkey. They were survived by her three daughters, Allison Lambird Watson, Elizabeth Lambird Youngblood and Susannah Lambird Collier.

== Bibliography ==
- 1963 Commencement Exercises (PDF) (Report). Baltimore, Maryland: University of Maryland. June 8, 1963.
