= Tony Sumpter =

American football player (1922–2017)

Profile
- Position: Guard

Personal information
- Born: September 13, 1922; Fletcher, Oklahoma
- Died: December 9, 2017 (aged 95)
- Listed height: 6 ft 2 in (1.88 m)
- Listed weight: 215 lb (98 kg)

Career information
- High school: Lawton (OK)
- College: Cameron
- NFL draft: 1946: undrafted

Career history
- Chicago Rockets (1946–1947)
- Stats at Pro Football Reference

Anthony B. Sumpter (September 13, 1922 – December 9, 2017) was an American football guard who played two seasons with the Chicago Rockets. He played college football at Cameron University, having previously attended Lawton High School in Lawton, Oklahoma.
