= Nancy Coats-Ashley =

American lawyer and judge

- Born: Ohio
- Occupation: Lawyer
- Known for: District Court Judge for Oklahoma County, former President of the Oklahoma Federal Bar Association, Oklahoma Bar Foundation and the William J. Holloway Jr. American Inn of Court
- Spouse: Charles Robert Ashley (died 2018)
- Children: 4

Nancy Coats-Ashley was the first female lawyer for Southwestern Bell Telephone Company in the five state area consisting of Texas, Missouri, Arkansas, Kansas and Oklahoma. She also served as a District Court Judge for Oklahoma County beginning in 1995 and ending in 2004 with her retirement. During that time she started the Mental Health Court of Oklahoma County, one of the first courts of its kind in the Southwest. Coats-Ashley served as President of the Oklahoma Federal Bar Association, the Oklahoma Bar Foundation and the William J. Holloway Jr. American Inn of Court and was appointed by former Governor of Oklahoma, Brad Henry to serve as a member of the Oklahoma Forensic Review Board. Coats-Ashley was inducted into the Oklahoma Women's Hall of Fame in 2005 for her work as a pioneer in her field.

== Early life ==
Nancy Coats-Ashley was born in Ohio and lived there until she was eight years old. Her family moved to Phoenix, Arizona and she graduated from West Phoenix High School. Earlier in the eighth grade, Coats-Ashley wrote a career paper that featured practicing law as her intended future career. This was during the 1950s when such a profession was not readily encouraged for young women. After high school, she attended Occidental College in Los Angeles and earned her bachelor's degree in education from the University of Arizona. After earning her bachelor's, Coats-Ashley was awarded a small graduate fellowship that enabled her to enter law school. She began at the University of Arizona and transferred to the University of Oklahoma after two years, where she completed her Juris Doctor. In 1983, she met and later married Charles Robert Ashley in the Washington, D.C. office of AT&T. They moved to Oklahoma City in 1987, and had four children.

== Career ==
Coats-Ashley began her career as a federal law clerk. She worked in this position until her first child was born in 1966. Her second child was born in 1968 and for several years she stayed home with her young children. In 1972, Coats-Ashley was hired as the first woman lawyer for Southwestern Bell Telephone Company in the five state area of Southwestern Bell Telephone, including Arkansas, Texas, Missouri, Kansas and Oklahoma. Out of her work with Southwestern Bell, Coats-Ashley later moved to Washington D.C. in 1982 to work for AT&T. In 1987, she returned to Oklahoma and finished out her career in the Bell system. As her career with Southwestern Bell came to a close, Coats-Ashley decided to run for district judge and was elected in 1994 and sworn in in 1995.

During her time as a district judge, Coats-Ashley started the first mental health court in Oklahoma County. This made Oklahoma among the first states to have such a court and the first in the Southwest. Coats-Ashley served ten years in this position and retired in 2004. In 2005, she was inducted into the Oklahoma Women's Hall of Fame.

The Nancy Coats-Ashley Community Foundation Scholar Award was established to honor Coats-Ashley's time as a Trustee of the Oklahoma City Community Foundation. The endowment fund supports Trustee Scholarship Initiative programs of the Oklahoma City Community Foundation.

=== Other involvements ===
Aside from her career, Coats-Ashley has spent her time in numerous organizations. Some of these various involvements include:

- Former President of the Oklahoma Federal Bar Association, the Oklahoma Bar Foundation and the William J. Holloway Jr. American Inn of Court
- Former trustee of the Oklahoma City Community Foundation (2003 - 2012)
- Former member of the Oklahoma Forensic Review Board
- Tutor at Oklahoma City middle school
- Oklahoma Women's Coalition: Voices for Change

=== Awards ===
- Oklahoma Women's Hall of Fame (2005)
- OBA Judicial Excellence Award
- Mona Lambird Spotlight Award
- Paragon Award Recipient (2004)
- HeartLine Honoree (2002)
