= Betty Price (arts advisor) =

American music teacher (1931–2023)

- Born: Betty Ann Durham; February 27, 1931; Booneville, Arkansas, U.S.
- Died: October 23, 2023 (aged 92); Oklahoma City, Oklahoma, U.S.
- Occupations: Music teacher, art director and ambassador
- Known for: Executive Director of the Oklahoma Arts Council (1983–2007)
- Spouse: Norris Price (m. 1954; died 2019)

Betty Ann Price (née Durham; February 27, 1931 – October 23, 2023) was an American music teacher, art director, and ambassador. She served as the executive director of the Oklahoma Arts Council from 1983 to 2007. During her time as executive director, Price worked with eight different Oklahoma governors. She also served as an arts advisor to states, non-profit organizations, and a number of boards. She was inducted into the Oklahoma Women's Hall of Fame in 1985, among many other awards and recognitions.

== Early life ==
Betty Price was born in Booneville, Arkansas, in 1931 to Wilson and Elizabeth Durham. She lived with her family in Shawnee, Oklahoma, and El Paso, Texas, before moving to Muskogee, Oklahoma, where she began attending school. During her grade school years, Price enjoyed fine arts and journalism. Price learned how to play the piano while in second grade. She later became involved with the school newspaper, an activity that would follow her into her college years.

=== Education ===
Price attended North-eastern State University, where she received a scholarship and became editor of the college newspaper. She graduated from NSU with a degree in music education. While at university, Price met her husband, Norris Allen Price. The two dated through their sophomore year and married after he returned from Japan after serving a year in the National Guard.

== Early career ==
Upon graduation, Price upskilled her first year in Norman, Oklahoma, teaching at two separate schools every day. During her second year, Price coached second grade in Del City, Oklahoma, and her husband, Norris, began his career in real estate. After teaching for two years, Price became pregnant with her first child. She left school teaching and began teaching piano lessons while she raised her newborn. When a neighbor, John L. Garrett, was elected to the Oklahoma Senate in 1964, Price went to work for him as a typist. She began to bring artwork into the office. Other senators came to her, asking for art for their offices. This led to a friendship with former governor George Nigh, lieutenant-governor at the time.

== Oklahoma Arts Council ==
Price began to work as a secretary and artist for lieutenant-governor George Nigh. Price painted all of the state emblems along with other projects as directed by Nigh. During legislative sessions, Price would take a week off and participate in the Festival of the Arts in Oklahoma City. At this festival, Price met the director of the Oklahoma Arts Council (then called the Oklahoma Arts and Humanities Council), and he asked her to work for them full-time. In 1974, Price joined the Oklahoma Arts Council as the public information director and State Capitol liaison. Price began contracting artists to bring more artwork to the Capitol. In 1983, Price became the executive director of the Oklahoma Arts Council.

As director, Price's main goal was to increase awareness of and funding for the arts across the state of Oklahoma. Price helped to expand the position with her interest in the visual arts and the Capitol. She was able to get legislation written to establish a Capitol Preservation Commission.

The Oklahoma Arts Council was the first state agency to go online, which gave the public a greater chance to get involved with the arts. Price was made responsible for commissioning artwork and murals that improved the bare Capitol walls. Price helped commission Mike Larsen, who painted "Flight of the Spirit," a mural on the rotunda that honored all five of Oklahoma's American Indian world-class ballerinas. Five years later, the ballerinas were brought back to the Capitol to be named Cultural Treasures, an award developed during Price's time as Director of the Arts Council. Galleries were also created in the State Capitol during Price's time on the council. A gallery on the first floor is reserved for changing exhibits, another for photography, and, in 2008, a gallery for the State Art Collection was named the Betty Price Gallery in her honor.

=== Retirement and death ===
During retirement, Price remained busy supporting the arts. She was on the Red Earth Advisory Board as well as the Indian Museum and Cultural Centre Board. Aside from her involvement with the arts, Price spent time with her husband Norris, their children, and grandchildren. Norris Price died in December 2019.

Betty Price died on October 23, 2023, in Oklahoma City.

=== Awards and recognition ===
Throughout her lengthy career, Price was honored with numerous awards and recognition, including:

- Oklahoma Women's Hall of Fame inductee (1985)
- Red Earth Ambassador of the Year (2006)
- State Arts Agency Director of the Year by the National Assembly of State Art Agencies in Washington, D.C. (2000)
- Newsmaker Award from the Tulsa chapter of the Association of Women in Communications (2004)
- Named in Oklahoma magazine's Women of Influence
- Named Honoured One at the Oklahoma Indian Sovereignty Symposium (1999)
- Chickasaw Nation Governor's Award (1999)
- Centennial Woman of Distinction from the Sigma Sigma Sigma sorority (1998)
- National Alumna Award from the Sigma Sigma Sigma Sorority
- North-eastern State University Homecoming Honoree (2009)
- Betty Price Scholarship named at North-eastern State University
- "Life, Legacy and Light" Award by the Oklahoma Israel Exchange (2010)
- Del City Hall of Fame (1983)
