= Ray Gene Smith =

American football player (1928–2005)

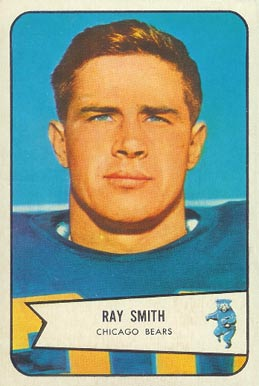
- Smith on a 1954 Bowman football card

No. 20
- Position: Defensive back

Personal information
- Born: November 27, 1928; Anadarko, Oklahoma, U.S.
- Died: August 16, 2005 (aged 76); Garland, Texas, U.S.
- Listed height: 5 ft 10 in (1.78 m)
- Listed weight: 187 lb (85 kg)

Career information
- High school: Lawton (Lawton, Oklahoma)
- College: Hardin

Career history
- Chicago Bears (1954–1957)

Awards and highlights
- Second-team All-Pro (1956)
- Stats at Pro Football Reference

Ray Gene Smith (November 27, 1928 – August 16, 2005) was an American professional football defensive back who played four seasons with the Chicago Bears of the National Football League (NFL). He played college football at Cameron State Agricultural College and Hardin College.

== Early life and college ==
Ray Gene Smith was born on November 27, 1928, in Anadarko, Oklahoma. He attended Lawton High School in Lawton, Oklahoma.

Smith first played college football at Cameron State Agricultural College. He was later a two-year starter for the Hardin Indians of Hardin College—now known as Midwestern State University. He was inducted into Midwestern State's Hall of Honor in 2013.

== Professional career ==
After graduating from Midwestern State University in 1950, he served in the U.S. Marine Corps for four years. After leaving the Marines, he played for the Chicago Bears where in 1956, he was named a second-team All-NFL performer by the New York Daily News. He played in 40 career games, all starts, for the Bears from 1954 to 1957, recording nine interceptions for 124 yards, 27 punt returns for 156 yards, four kick returns for 78 yards, and four receptions for 50 yards. Smith also started one playoff game in 1956.

== Personal life ==
After 1957, he decided to return to academia at the University of Texas Law School graduating in 1962 with his Juris Doctor. He practiced criminal law in Wichita Falls, Texas for 35 years. During his time practicing law, he was suspended more than once for neglecting a client's file and ultimately disbarred when he was 73 on September 17, 2002. In his lifetime, he had a daughter, two grandchildren, five great-grandchildren, and two brothers. He died at the age of 76 in Garland, Texas and was buried at Anadarko City Cemetery.
