= Opaline Deveraux Wadkins =

- Born: Opaline Deveraux; March 26, 1912; Carthage, Texas
- Died: April 11, 2000 (aged 88); Oklahoma City, Oklahoma
- Occupation: nurse
- Years active: 1938–1976
- Known for: establishing black nursing schools in Oklahoma City

Opaline Deveraux Wadkins (1912–2000) organized the first school to train black nurses in Oklahoma City, fought for desegregation of the College of Nursing at the University of Oklahoma and founded the School of Nursing at Langston University. She was the first African American nurse to earn a master's degree from the University of Oklahoma. She was honored in 1987 by the Oklahoma Public Health Association and inducted into the Oklahoma Women's Hall of Fame in 1993.

== Biography ==
Opaline Deveraux was born on March 26, 1912, in Carthage, Texas, to Henry and Effie (née Roquemore) Davereaux. Deveraux, a registered nurse, was hired by the Department of Public Health in 1938 to recruit black nurses. In 1940 in Oklahoma City, she married Bert V. Wadkins of Fayetteville, Tennessee. She and the Oklahoma Negro Medical Society lobbied University Hospital to admit African Americans and in 1945, the first hospital in Oklahoma City to treat black patients was established as the University Hospital South Ward. The regents of the University of Oklahoma also approved establishing a school to train African American nurses. In 1948, Wadkins, who was a nursing supervisor, was granted a pay raise and by 1949 she was the organizer of the first school for African American nurses in Oklahoma City. She trained over 200 LPNs between 1949 and 1953. During the same time frame, she participated in the annual Youth Negro Aquatic School held at Lake Murray.

Wadkins was the first African American to earn a master's degree in nursing from the University of Oklahoma, becoming instrumental in desegregating the University of Oklahoma College of Nursing. She recognized the needs to provide health services to Native American, as well and developed a health program and well-baby care initiative for Indians in Southwestern Oklahoma. It was the first pediatric service for native infants and effectively decreased infant mortality by 50%. She instituted health and diabetic clinics for black patients through Oklahoma City's African American churches. In the 1970s, developed a prenatal clinic for teenage mothers, naming it the "Stork's Nest" and during the same time frame she established the Langston University School of Nursing.

In November 1976, Wadkins retired. David Boren, then governor of Oklahoma, declared November 14 as Opaline Wadkins Day. She was also honored by a citation from the VA Hospital Nursing Service. She was honored in 1987 by the Oklahoma Public Health Association and inducted into the Oklahoma Women’s Hall of Fame in 1993. In 2000, the Oklahoma City-Norman Chapter of the OU Black Alumni Society granted her their Trail Blazer award. Wadkins died on 11 April 2000 in Oklahoma City, Oklahoma.
