= Jill Zink Tarbel =

American disability rights advocate (1924–2009)

- Zink in 1945
- Born: Swannie Smith Zink; August 25, 1924; Tulsa, Oklahoma, US
- Died: January 22, 2009 (aged 84); Tulsa, Oklahoma, US
- Other names: Jill Zink Hott, Jill Hott Tarbel
- Occupation: Disability rights advocate
- Relatives: Jack Zink (brother)

Swannie Smith "Jill" Zink Hott Tarbel (August 25, 1924 – January 22, 2009) was an American disability rights advocate and trustee of the University of Tulsa. She was inducted into the Oklahoma Women's Hall of Fame in 2001.

== Early life and education ==
Jill Zink was born in Tulsa, Oklahoma, the daughter of John Steele Zink and Swannie Estelle Smith Zink. Her father was a businessman and rancher. She survived polio at age 13, with paralysis from the waist down; She spent some months recovering at Warm Springs, Georgia, in 1938. She used leg braces, a cane or crutches as a young woman, and a wheelchair later in life. She graduated from Will Rogers High School in 1942, and from the University of Tulsa in 1946. Her brother Jack Zink became an automotive engineer, inventor, and motorsports owner.

== Career ==
Tarbel was appointed to the Mayor's Commission on Concerns of the Disabled in Tulsa. In 1983, she was appointed a trustee of the University of Tulsa. She also served on the Oklahoma advisory board of the United States Civil Rights Commission. Other organizations she supported with her time and leadership included the Tulsa Junior College Foundation, River Parks Authority, Tulsa Senior Services, Hillcrest Medical Center Foundation, Philbrook Museum of Art, the Tulsa Opera, The Tulsa Philharmonic, the Magic Empire Council of Girl Scouts, the Simon Estes Education Foundation, Daughters of the American Colonists in Oklahoma, and Planned Parenthood. She and her second husband, who was also a wheelchair user, worked especially for accessible public transportation and parks in Tulsa. "Jill Hott Tarbel moves through Tulsa like a bloodhound on the prowl, sniffing out physical and attitudinal barriers that make life difficult for Tulsa's handicapped community," began a 1982 newspaper story. "The wheelchair is her lifeline and she operates it with the same zest of a golfer driving an electric cart."

== Honors ==
Tarbel was chair of Oklahoma's programs for International Year of Disabled Persons in 1981. In 1992, Tarbel received the Newsmaker Award from the Tulsa chapter of Women in Communications Inc. Tarbel was honored on behalf of the Zink family by the Magic Empire Council of Girl Scouts, for their decades of support for scouting. The Jill and Brook Tarbel Lifetime Achievement Award was named for the Tarbels in 1996. In 2001, she was inducted into the Oklahoma Women's Hall of Fame. A section of a Tulsa street was named for her in 2009; there is also a meeting room named for her at the University of Tulsa. A wheelchair-accessible treehouse and park space was named for the Tarbels in 2014.

== Personal life ==
Zink married Donald Ray Hott in 1946. They had four children. She married again to petroleum engineer and oil executive Brook Tarbel. She died in 2009, at the age of 84, in Tulsa.
