= Suzanne Edmondson =

American educator (born 1945)

- Born: Suzanne; 1945 (age 80–81); Moline, Illinois
- Education: Marycrest College, University of San Diego College for Women
- Known for: Founder of several programs that help with the rehabilitation and education of incarcerated women
- Spouse: James E. "Jim" Edmondson

Suzanne Edmondson is the founder of several programs such as Tales for the Rising Moon and The Friends of Eddie Warrior Foundation, all aiding in the rehabilitation and education of incarcerated women. The program allocates funds for textbooks and tuition that allows inmates the opportunity to earn their associate of arts degree through Connors State College. Among other honors, Edmondson was inducted into the Oklahoma Women's Hall of Fame in 2009.

== Early life ==
Suzanne Edmondson (b. 1945) (Note: One news article identified her as Suzanne Rumler Edmondson.) was born in Moline, Illinois and grew up in the Quad Cities area. She attended high school in Rock Island, Illinois. Edmondson attended Marycrest College, a women's college in Davenport, Iowa and eventually transferred to the University of San Diego College for Women. She met her husband, Jim, in San Diego as he was stationed there as a lieutenant in the Navy. Suzanne did not finish her degree but instead married and raised her children. She remained very involved with community work through Girl Scouts, the YMCA, and the PTA. For six years, Edmondson served as President of Friends of the Library in Muskogee.

== Volunteer Work ==
In 1996, she began training for a certification in Laubach Literacy. She took her training and became a literacy tutor for several years, working with incarcerated women. In 1997, Edmondson incorporated Friends of the Eddie Warrior Foundation. The Foundation's purpose is to help provide a college education for women incarcerated at Eddie Warrior. (Note: The Dr. Eddie Warrior Correctional Center is a minimum security prison in Taft, Oklahoma. Owned by the Oklahoma Department of Corrections, it opened in 1988.) The funds cover tuition and books and allow inmates to earn their associate of arts degrees through Connors State College. Edmondson also started a writing program that helps incarcerated women become writers, offering classes and prompts. Another one of her programs, Tales for the Rising Moon, a program in which inmates are recorded reading books to their children, has been featured in People magazine.

Edmondson was inducted into the Oklahoma Women's Hall of Fame in 2009. She also received the Medal of Honor from the Daughters of the American Revolution and was named Volunteer of the Year by Oklahoma Department of Corrections for her service to female inmates.
