= Kate Frank =

American teacher and activist (1890–1982)

- Born: February 5, 1890; Missouri
- Died: April 1982; Muskogee, Oklahoma
- Occupations: educator, activist
- Years active: 1909–1956
- Known for: establishing the Oklahoma Education Association legal defense fund

Kate Frank (February 5, 1890 – April 1982) was a Missouri-born, Oklahoma teacher who taught for nearly 50 years. She was instrumental in the founding of the Oklahoma Education Association, served as its first president, and later, donated the initial monies for the trust that became a legal defense fund for educators. She served as vice president of the National Education Association in the 1940s and was the first national Retired Teacher of the Year recipient. Honored by many awards, she was inducted into the Oklahoma Women's Hall of Fame in 1983.

== Biography ==
Frank was born on February 5, 1890, on a farm in Missouri. By the age of 18, she was teaching eight grades in a one-room school house for a Missouri mining town, but moved to Oklahoma around the end of World War I. Frank was hired as one of the inaugural teachers for West Junior High School, which opened in 1920 in Muskogee, and taught there through 1923. She received a bachelor's degree from Southwest Teachers College in Springfield, Missouri, in 1924, and later earned a master's degree from the University of Missouri. After several years at West, Frank moved to Muskogee's Central High School, where she taught business education.

In the 1930s, Frank served as president of the Muskogee Classroom Teachers Department, later the Muskogee Classroom Teacher's Association. In 1934, she became one of the founders of the state classroom teacher's association and by 1936, she was serving as the president of the Oklahoma Education Association (OEA), as the first person and woman elected to head the organization. As president, Frank began a series of studies to evaluate classroom organization, teacher pay, school revenues, and tenure, though the proposals for change were not approved by the state legislature. Frank was elected to serve as vice president of the National Education Association (NEA) in 1942, and though re-elected to the post in 1943, she was fired by the Muskogee School Board. Although Frank was never given a specific reason for the termination, it was widely reported that it was for failure to back a specific candidate in a school board election and for her previous agitation for teacher pay guarantees. She took the case to court and was backed by the NEA, which raised funds to pay her salary while suspended. She was reinstated in 1945 and returned the unused money collected in her behalf to the NEA. The monies were used to establish a fund now called the Kate Frank/DuShane Legal Services Program, as a defense fund for teachers needing help in legal matters concerning their employment. Even after her reinstatement, Frank continued to fight for improved benefits for teachers, including health insurance and paid sick leave.

In 1950, she was selected by Yale and Michigan State Universities for a study tour in Europe to evaluate European educational systems. Frank retired from teaching in 1956, having taught for 47 years, but continued her advocacy, arguing for senior citizens' rights. In 1961, she was appointed by Governor J. Howard Edmondson to serve on the state Teacher's Retirement System Board of Trustees, on which she continued to serve for ten years. That same year, she attended the White House Conference on Aging and began promoting a teacher's retirement home while in Washington, D.C. The following year, Frank obtained a loan from the Federal Housing Administration to build the first high-rise apartment building in Muskogee, Oklahoma, as a residence for retired teachers. The apartments are now open to any senior citizen above age 62, who is still ambulatory and offers subsidies from the Oklahoma Department of Rehabilitation Services for rent.

Frank received multiple awards and recognition at the local, state, and national levels. In Muskogee, there is a street named after her, "Kate Frank Drive"; "Kate Frank Manor", the apartment high-rise for which she lobbied bears her name; and the OEA annual award for service excellence is named in her honor. In 1972 Frank was the first honoree to receive the National Retired Teacher of the Year Award, which she accepted from first lady Pat Nixon. In 1979 she was named as the Outstanding Older Oklahoman by Governor George Nigh, for her work in helping to found the American Association of Retired Persons and in 1983, she was inducted into the Oklahoma Women's Hall of Fame, posthumously.

Frank died in April 1982, in Muskogee, Oklahoma.
