= Aloysius Larch-Miller =

American suffragette and women's rights activist

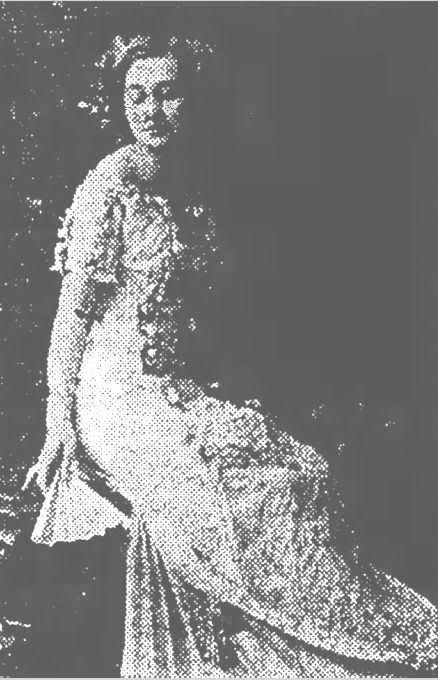
- Larch-Miller in 1918
- Born: September 27, 1886; Tennessee
- Died: February 2, 1920 (aged 33); Shawnee, Pottawatomie County, Oklahoma
- Other names: Aloysius Larchmiller
- Occupations: social worker, suffragette
- Years active: 1917–1920
- Notable work: debate on Ratification of the Nineteenth Amendment

Aloysius Larch-Miller (1886–1920, also known as Aloysius Larchmiller) was a suffragette and women's rights advocate from Oklahoma. She was most known for a debate speech made days before her death which resulted in passage of a proposal to ratify the Nineteenth Amendment. She was posthumously inducted into the inaugural group of women honored by the Oklahoma Women's Hall of Fame.

== Biography ==
=== Early years ===
Aloysius Larch-Miller was born on September 27, 1886, in Tennessee to Ellen (née Burke) and George Larch-Miller. The family moved to Oklahoma Territory after the 1900 census, but prior to Larch-Miller's sister, Genevieve's marriage in 1905, taking up residence in Shawnee, Pottawatomie County.

=== Work for women's suffrage ===
Larch-Miller became involved in the work of the Red Cross during the First World War. She was secretary of the county Red Cross organization and county chairman for the Third Liberty Loan. Larch-Miller worked with the Oklahoma suffrage movement, calling the first mass meeting of suffragettes in Oklahoma and served as chair of women's petitions. In 1919, she was authorized by the State Board of Education to supervise the addition of nursing training to the state normal schools.

Oklahoma voters passed a suffrage bill in November 1918, prior to the vote on the federal amendment, but a provision of the state law prohibited women from holding state office. When the US congress passed the voting amendment, Governor Robertson agreed to hold a special session to ratify the Nineteenth Amendment, if the women could get the attendants to come to the session at their own expense. In October, 1919, Larch-Miller, who was heading the ratification committee, and a delegation of suffragists secured a majority of support and attempted to meet with the governor to have him call the special session. He refused to meet with them to accept their list of supporters.

=== Death ===
In February, 1920, Larch-Miller, though sick with influenza, attended a county convention debate over ratification. She succeeded in defeating her rival's arguments and secured the convention's agreement to adopt the resolution by a 2 to 1 margin; however, she succumbed to her illness and died the following day. She died on February 2, 1920 and was buried on February 3 in the St. Benedict's Catholic Cemetery (now Calvary Cemetery) at Shawnee, Pottawatomie County, Oklahoma.

=== Legacy ===
Posthumously, Oklahoma ratified the Nineteenth Amendment on February 27, 1920. In 1982, Larch-Miller was inducted into the Oklahoma Women's Hall of Fame as one of the inaugural inductees.

== Sources ==
- Pietrusza, David (2009). 1920: The Year of the Six Presidents. New York: Basic Books. ISBN 978-0-7867-3213-5.
