= Howser =

Howser may refer to:

== Surname ==
- Brian Howser (1975–1998), American professional wrestler
- Dick Howser (1936–1987), American Major League Baseball shortstop, coach and manager
- Huell Howser (1945–2013), American television actor, producer, writer, singer and voice actor
- the title character of Doogie Howser, M.D., an American TV series

== Other uses ==
- Howser Peak, a mountain in British Columbia, Canada
- Howser Spire, a group of three distinct peaks and a mountain in British Columbia, Canada

== See also ==
- Hooser, a list of people with the surname
- Hooser, Kansas, United States, an unincorporated community
- Houser, a list of people with the surname
- Houser Boon, a character in the film Cars
