= Hooser =

Hooser is a surname. Notable people with the surname include:

- Alex Hooser, a person in the American reality TV show Laguna Beach: The Real Orange County
- Carroll Hooser (born 1944), American former basketball player
- Gary Hooser (born 1954), American politician
- William S. Hooser, American silent film actor

== See also ==
- Houser, a surname
- Howser (disambiguation), including a list of people with the surname
