= Esther Houser =

- Born: Lancaster, Pennsylvania
- Education: University of Oklahoma, University of Texas
- Occupation: Former State Long-Term Care Ombudsman in the Aging Services Division of the Department of Human Services for the State of Oklahoma

Esther E. Houser is the former State Long-Term Care Ombudsman in the Aging Services Division of the Department of Human Services for the State of Oklahoma. Houser served as the Long-Term Care Ombudsman from 1979 until her retirement in 2014.

== Early life ==
Born in Lancaster, Pennsylvania, Houser spent most of her early life in the northeast. She was raised in New Cumberland, Pennsylvania and graduated from Cedar Cliff High School. Houser decided to move south and attended the University of Oklahoma where she earned her bachelor's degree in Social Work in 1972. Later in 1977, Houser earned a master's of science from the University of Texas.

== Career ==
Houser became involved with Oklahoma federal social work when she was hired to help with the implementation of food stamps, a brand new program at the time. Houser worked for a year in food stamps and moved her way through several programs in the following years. She eventually noted to the supervisor of the Social Services Division in Oklahoma County DHS office that the state was lacking a program that dealt specifically with elders. After three years in Oklahoma County, Houser moved to Austin, Texas to work on her master's degree. In 1977 after completing her degree, Houser moved back to Oklahoma to live and work closer to her friends.

Houser worked for a time in another position with the DHS before she was approached by the head of the Special Unit on Aging (now the Aging Services Division) to head a new ombudsman position mandated by the Older Americans Act Reauthorization of 1978. She began the job in 1979 and served in the position until her retirement in 2014. Houser built the program from a one-person staff to twenty-eight paid workers and 200 volunteers. Her work has been published in various publications and manuals related to Ombudsman practice and elderly care.

On March 29, 2003, Houser was inducted into the Oklahoma Women's Hall of Fame for her achievements.

== Accomplishments ==
A charter member of the National Association of Long-term Care Ombudsmen. She was on the executive board of that organization from 1989–94, and served two terms as national president; 1989–90 and 1993-94. According to the Director of Oklahoma Department of Health Services (OKDHS), Aging Services, Roy R. Keen, "... she is an outstanding advocate dedicated to improving the life of our nursing home residents." Houser was appointed as the first Oklahoma’s first statewide program coordinator of Protective Services for the Elderly, known today as Adult Protective Services (APS). After starting APS, she was asked to become head Oklahoma's new ombudsman initiative. building the group she led into one comprising 30 DHS employees and 250 volunteers, spread all over the state.

Houser spends much of her time speaking and writing to inform people about the needs of the elderly. She has been credited with promoting public and legislative support for passage of the Oklahoma Nursing Home Act of 1980 and the Health Care Initiative of 2001. She is the author or co-author of many articles concerning adult protection, health care, nursing home care and mental health.

She has also maintained a long-time interest in environmental issues. In 1999, the Oklahoma City Regional Group of the Sierra Club named her as “Sierran of the Year.”
