= Dewell Brewer =

American football player (born 1970)

No. 26
- Positions: Running back, return specialist

Personal information
- Born: May 22, 1970 (age 56); Lawton, Oklahoma, U.S.
- Listed height: 5 ft 8 in (1.73 m)
- Listed weight: 210 lb (95 kg)

Career information
- High school: Lawton (Oklahoma)
- College: Oklahoma (1989–1992)
- NFL draft: 1993: undrafted
- Expansion draft: 1995: 13th round, 26th overall pick

Career history
- Chicago Bears (1993)*; Indianapolis Colts (1994); Carolina Panthers (1995)
- * Offseason or practice squad member only
- Stats at Pro Football Reference

Dewell Lerome Brewer (born May 22, 1970) is an American former professional football running back who played one season with the Indianapolis Colts of the National Football League (NFL). He played college football at the University of Oklahoma.

== Early life ==
Dewell Lerome Brewer was born on May 22, 1970, in Lawton, Oklahoma. He played high school football at Lawton High School in Lawton, Oklahoma. He was named The Oklahoman's Offensive Player of the Year for both his junior and senior seasons. He helped Lawton High win the state title in 1987.

== College career ==
Brewer was a four-year letterman for the Oklahoma Sooners from 1989 to 1992. He totaled 118 carries for 584 yards and four touchdowns, and 12 kick returns for 226 yards his freshman year in 1989. He rushed 154 times for 872 yards and eight touchdowns in 1990 while also returning 6 kicks for 125 yards. In 1991, Brewer recorded 43 rushing attempts for 263 yards and three touchdowns. As a senior in 1992, he totaled 120 carries for 521 yards and four touchdowns, 18 receptions for 260 yards, 31 punt returns for 123 yards, and 11 kick returns for 213 yards.

== Professional career ==
After going undrafted in the 1993 NFL draft, Brewer signed with the Chicago Bears on April 29, 1993. He was released on August 24, 1993.

Brewer was signed by the Indianapolis Colts on July 19, 1994. He played in all 16 games for the Colts during the 1994 season, returning 42 punts for 339 yards and one touchdown and 18 kicks for 358 yards. His 42 punt returns were the most in the NFL that season. He also fumbled three times and recorded one fumble recovery that year.

Brewer was selected by the Carolina Panthers in the 1995 NFL expansion draft. He was placed on injured reserve on August 27, 1995, and spent the entire 1995 season there. He became a free agent after the season and re-signed with the Panthers on April 12, 1996. Brewer was released on August 7, 1996.

== Coaching career ==
Brewer later became an assistant football coach and track coach at his alma mater, Lawton High School.
