= Jessie Thatcher Bost =

- Born: Jessie Olive Thatcher; December 16, 1875; Guthrie Center, Iowa, US
- Died: February 2, 1963 (aged 87); Cleveland, Oklahoma, US
- Occupation: Teacher
- Known for: First female student admitted to Oklahoma A&M University (now Oklahoma State University)

Jessie Olive Thatcher Bost (December 16, 1875 – February 2, 1963) was the first female graduate of Oklahoma State University.

Bost was born in Guthrie Center, Iowa. Her family moved to Stillwater in 1891, then part of Oklahoma Territory, and she enrolled in a university, then known as Oklahoma Agricultural and Mechanical (A&M) College, when it opened later that year. She graduated in 1897, alongside two male students in the university's second graduating class. (Note: A case of typhoid fever had prevented her from graduating with the first class in 1896.) After graduation, Bost worked as a public school teacher in Stillwater. Bost remained involved with the university and became the president of its Alumni Association in 1902 and the Half-Century Club in 1954. The university named its women's dormitory "Jessie Thatcher Hall" for Bost when it opened in 1925.

== Marriage and family ==
Jessie married Henry A. Bost, a fellow student, on July 16, 1902. They continued to live in Stillwater until 1907. Meanwhile, the couple had four children and moved to Alva in 1908. As soon as she settled in Alva, she organized a Parent-Teachers Association (PTA) and was elected chairman of the Northwest PTA. (Note: One source states that the Bosts spent 1907 homesteading in the western part of Oklahoma.)

Jessie Bost interrupted her career in education and spent full time raising children. She and Henry had four children. (Note: The Encyclopedia of Oklahoma History and Culture states that the Bosts had four children (three of whom attended Oklahoma A&M). It also states that she retired from teaching in 1946.)

Bost was inducted into the Oklahoma Women's Hall of Fame in 1997.
