= Lawton High School =

LHS
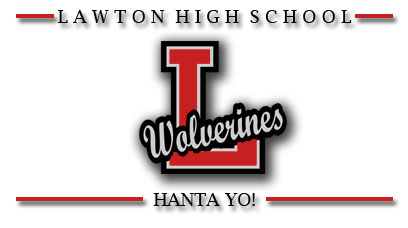

Location
- 601 Northwest Fort Sill Boulevard; Lawton, Oklahoma 73507; United States; 34°37′02″N 98°24′13″W

Information
- Type: Co-educational, public, secondary
- Established: 1901
- School district: Lawton Public Schools
- Teaching staff: 88.98 (FTE)
- Grades: 9-12
- Enrollment: 1,332 (2023–2024)
- Student to teacher ratio: 14.97
- Colors: Black; Scarlet; White
- Athletics conference: 6A Division 2 (football) 6A (all other athletics)
- Mascot: Wolverine
- Rivals: Eisenhower High School & MacArthur High School
- Newspaper: The Tatler
- Yearbook: The Lore
- Website: lawton-sr-high.lawtonps.org/o/lawton-sr-high

Lawton High School (LHS) was the first high school built in Lawton, Oklahoma, United States. It is a part of Lawton Public Schools.

Lawton High is located at 601 Northwest Fort Sill Boulevard. The school was originally housed in a building on 800 Southwest 'C' Avenue, which later came to be the Central Junior High building until the junior high was also moved to 1201 Northwest Fort Sill Boulevard. The current Lawton High School was built in 1954.

On-post residents of Fort Sill are zoned to this high school.

== Athletics championships ==
Oklahoma 6A
- Football: 2014 runner-up, 2016 runner-up
Oklahoma 5A
- Football: 1987
- Wrestling: 1989, 1992, 1993
- Wrestling: National Champions 1993
Oklahoma 4A
- Football: 1970
- Boys' track: 1974, 1976
  - 110 hurdles state meet record: 1980
Oklahoma 2A
- Baseball: 1959, 1962, 1964, 1965
- Boys' basketball: 1962
- Football: 1962, 1963
- Boys' track: 1960, 1961, 1962
Oklahoma A
- Boys' tennis
  - Singles: 1966
- Girls' tennis: 1958, 1959, 1962
  - Doubles: 1958, 1959, 1960, 1961, 1962, 1963, 1966
  - Singles: 1959, 1962
Oklahoma Class 1
- Girls' basketball: 1928
- Girls' golf: 1939

== Notable alumni ==
- Randy Bass – MLB and Nippon Professional Baseball player
- John Bateman – Major League Baseball (MLB) player
- Don Blanding – poet
- John Paul Brammer – advice columnist / writer
- Dewell Brewer – NFL running-back for the Carolina Panthers
- C. J. Cherryh – Award-winning science fiction novelist
- Ginny Creveling – activist and charity organizer
- Weldon Gentry – NFL player and coach
- Eddie Hinton – NFL player
- Stacey King – National Basketball Association (NBA) player
- Paul Littlechief – Las Vegas performer
- Mike Minter – NFL player and football coach
- Rico Noel – MLB player
- Antonio Perkins – NFL player
- Will Shields – NFL player
- Ray Gene Smith – NFL player
- Kelly Stinnett – MLB player
- Tony Sumpter – NFL player
- James Trapp – NFL player
- Hank Walbrick – college football coach
