= Ginny Creveling =

- Born: Manila, Philippines
- Occupation: Former Executive Director of ONEOK Foundation
- Known for: Helped found Rainbow House, which led to organizations such as the Child Abuse Network and the Parent Child Center

Ginny Creveling is the former executive director of the ONEOK foundation and a champion of numerous causes and organizations in Tulsa, Oklahoma, United States. She played a vital role in the creation of the Rainbow House in 1977, a child abuse prevention program and crisis nursery, the first of its kind, which led to later organizations such as the Child Abuse Network and the Parent Child Center. She has served as a community leader in race and ethnic relations with the Oklahoma Conference for Community and Justice. In 2007, Creveling was inducted into the Oklahoma Women's Hall of Fame for her volunteer and advocacy work.

== Early life ==
Ginny Creveling was born in Manila, Philippines to Filipino parents. Her father was in the Filipino Army, and was commissioned on the battlefield into the U.S. Army, which at that time made him a U.S. citizen, making his wife and Creveling's mother also a legal U.S. citizen. All seven of their children also qualified for citizenship, and when they moved to the United States, most of Creveling's childhood was spent at numerous army bases. She was the oldest of seven children and had a large responsibility with the rearing of her younger siblings as a child, as her mother worked.

Creveling graduated from Lawton High School in 1964. College was highly encouraged by her parents, so Creveling attended the University of Oklahoma, where she entered a nursing program. A few years later, her mother fell ill, so she returned to California to care for her.

Soon after, Creveling was married and moved back to Oklahoma, where she had two children. When they were old enough to be in school, she re-entered a nursing program at the University of Tulsa, taking a class a semester. She earned her nursing degree in 1984, and later went back to school again and earned her MBA in 2000.

While Creveling was a stay-at-home mother, she was involved with numerous volunteer organizations, and one of these involvements led to a job.

== Career ==
Through her volunteer efforts, Creveling was offered a position as PR director at the Westin Hotel, where she worked part-time for approximately eight years. The hotel eventually closed and Creveling was offered a position to head staffing for the National Governors Association meeting held in Tulsa in 1993. After this event, she was offered a job from ONEOK. The company created a position for Creveling in community relations. When the ONEOK Foundation was established in 1997, she was there from the beginning as executive director.

== Community involvement ==
Creveling played a vital role in the creation of Rainbow House, a child abuse prevention program and 24/7 crisis nursery that was the first of its kind. Eventually the program had to be closed due to loss of funding, but was merged with the Children's Registry at Hillcrest Medical Center, which then merged with Parents Anonymous, which is now the Parent Child Center. Her early advocacy work with child abuse led to a greater discourse in the community which led to other programs to flourish in Tulsa.

Creveling has also played a large part in developing The Oklahoma Center for Community and Justice, a human relations organization dedicated to fighting bias, bigotry and racism and promoting respect and understanding through education and advocacy.

Other community groups which Creveling is involved include:

- Association of Women in Communications
- Funders Roundtable
- Tulsa Press Club
- Advisory council of Habitat for Humanity
- Advisory council for Tulsa Young Professionals
- Advisory council for the University of Oklahoma-Tulsa and University of Tulsa College of Business Administration
- Board of Directors for the Oklahoma Jazz Hall of Fame
- Former president and currently board of directors for the Child Abuse Network
- American Heart Association
- Big Brothers & Sisters
- Domestic Violence Intervention Services
- Leadership Oklahoma and Leadership Tulsa
- Sister Cities International
- Tulsa Ballet Theater
- Magic Empire Council of Girl Scouts

=== Awards and recognition ===
- Oklahoma Women's Hall of Fame inductee (2007)
- Juliette Low Leadership Award (2006)
- Tulsan of the Year from Tulsa People magazine (2005)
- Fifty Making a Difference by the Oklahoma Journal Record (2003 and 2005)
