= Hauser =

Hauser is a German-language surname. Notable people with the surname include:

- Arnold George Hauser (1888–1966), American baseball player
- Arnold Hauser (art historian) (1892–1978), Hungarian art historian
- Bodo Hauser (1946–2004), German journalist and writer
- Cole Hauser (born 1975), American actor
- Dwight Hauser (1911–1969), screenwriter, actor, and producer; father of Wings
- Eduard Hauser (cross-country skier) (b. 1948), Swiss cross-country skier
- Eduard Hauser (general) (1895–1961), Generalleutnant in the Wehrmacht during World War II
- Emily Hauser (born 1987 or 1988), British classicist and novelist
- Erich Hauser (1930–2004), German sculptor
- Friedrich Hauser (1859–1917), German classical archaeologist and art historian
- Gayelord Hauser (1895–1984), German-American nutritionist and author
- Henri Hauser (1866–1946), Algerian-born French historian
- Hermann Hauser (born 1948), Austrian entrepreneur and cofounder of Acorn Computers
- Hermann Hauser Sr. (1882–1952), German luthier
- Joey Hauser (born 1999), American basketball player
- Julius Hauser (1854–1920), NYS Treasurer 1907-1908
- Kaspar Hauser (1812–1833), German foundling
- Lisa Theresa Hauser (born 1993), Austrian biathlete
- Manuela Hauser Wirth (born 1960s), Swiss art dealer
- Marc Hauser (born 1959), American ethologist found guilty of scientific misconduct
- Miska Hauser (1822–1878), Austrian violinist
- Nolan Hauser (born 2005), American football player
- Otto Hauser (1874–1932), Swiss pre-historian
- Paul Walter Hauser (born 1986), American actor
- Philip Hauser (1909–1994), demographer
- Sam Hauser (born 1997), American basketball player; brother of Joey
- Samuel Thomas Hauser (1833–1914), American politician from Montana
- Stjepan Hauser (born 1986), Croatian cellist
- Tim Hauser (1941–2014), singer and co-founder of vocal group The Manhattan Transfer
- Walter Hauser (1837–1902), Swiss politician
- Wings Hauser (1947–2025), American actor, director, and screenwriter
- Zvi Hauser (born 1968), Israeli politician

== See also ==
- Houser (disambiguation)
