= The Journal Record =

Daily business newspaper in Oklahoma City

- Type: Daily newspaper
- Format: Tabloid
- Owner: Journal Record Publishing
- Founded: 1937
- Headquarters: 101 N. Robinson, Ste. 101, Oklahoma City, Oklahoma
- Circulation: 3,400
- ISSN: 0737-5468
- Website: journalrecord.com

The Journal Record is a daily business and legal newspaper based in Oklahoma City, Oklahoma. Its offices are in downtown Oklahoma City, with a bureau at the Oklahoma State Capitol.

The Journal Record began publication in 1937, though an early predecessor of the newspaper, the Daily Legal News was first published in Oklahoma City on August 27, 1903.

The Oklahoma Journalism Hall of Fame includes seven Journal Record current or former staff members: Joan Gilmore (1994), Max Nichols (1995), Marie Price (1998), Bill May (2004), David Page (2011), Mary Mélon (2013) and Ted Streuli (2022). Two non-staff columnists are also Hall of Fame members: Arnold Hamilton (2011) and Joe Hight (2013). Its publisher, Journal Record Publishing Company is an affiliate of BridgeTower Media and formerly published Tinker Take Off and The Journal Record Legislative Report.

== History ==
The Journal Record was the result of a merger of two newspapers, The Daily Law Journal and the Daily Record in 1937. Known then as The Daily Law Journal Record, the paper was published by Freda Ameringer until 1972. Dan Hogan III, who bought the publication from Ameringer, formed the Journal-Record Publishing Company and moved to 621 North Robinson in 1978. Titled The Journal Record from that point on, its location remained the same until the bombing of the Alfred P. Murrah Federal Building.

Dolan Media (now BridgeTower Media) purchased The Journal Record Publishing Company in 1995 and moved its staff in 1996 to the Dowell Center on North Robinson Avenue. In 2006 the offices were moved to Corporate Tower at 101 North Robinson Avenue, then to Leadership Square at 211 N. Robinson, Suite 201-S. The Journal Record expanded its territory to include the Tulsa region in November 2005 and has added an online edition available only through subscription.

The Dolan Company issued an IPO in 2007 and was traded on the New York Stock Exchange under the symbol DM until it was delisted in 2014. The company entered a prepackaged Chapter 11 bankruptcy on Mar. 23, 2014 from which it emerged as a private company owned by Bayside Capital. CEO Jim Dolan was replaced by Mark McEachen, who took on a similar role with Freedom Communications upon its exit from bankruptcy in 2010.

On Dec. 31, 2015, the company was purchased by New Media Investment Group, the parent company of GateHouse Media, for $35 million. Today The Journal Record is owned by BridgeTower Media, which was acquired by Transom Capital Group in 2020.
