= 2013 Moore tornado =

2013 EF5 tornado in Moore, Oklahoma

Coordinates: 35.284°N 97.628°W

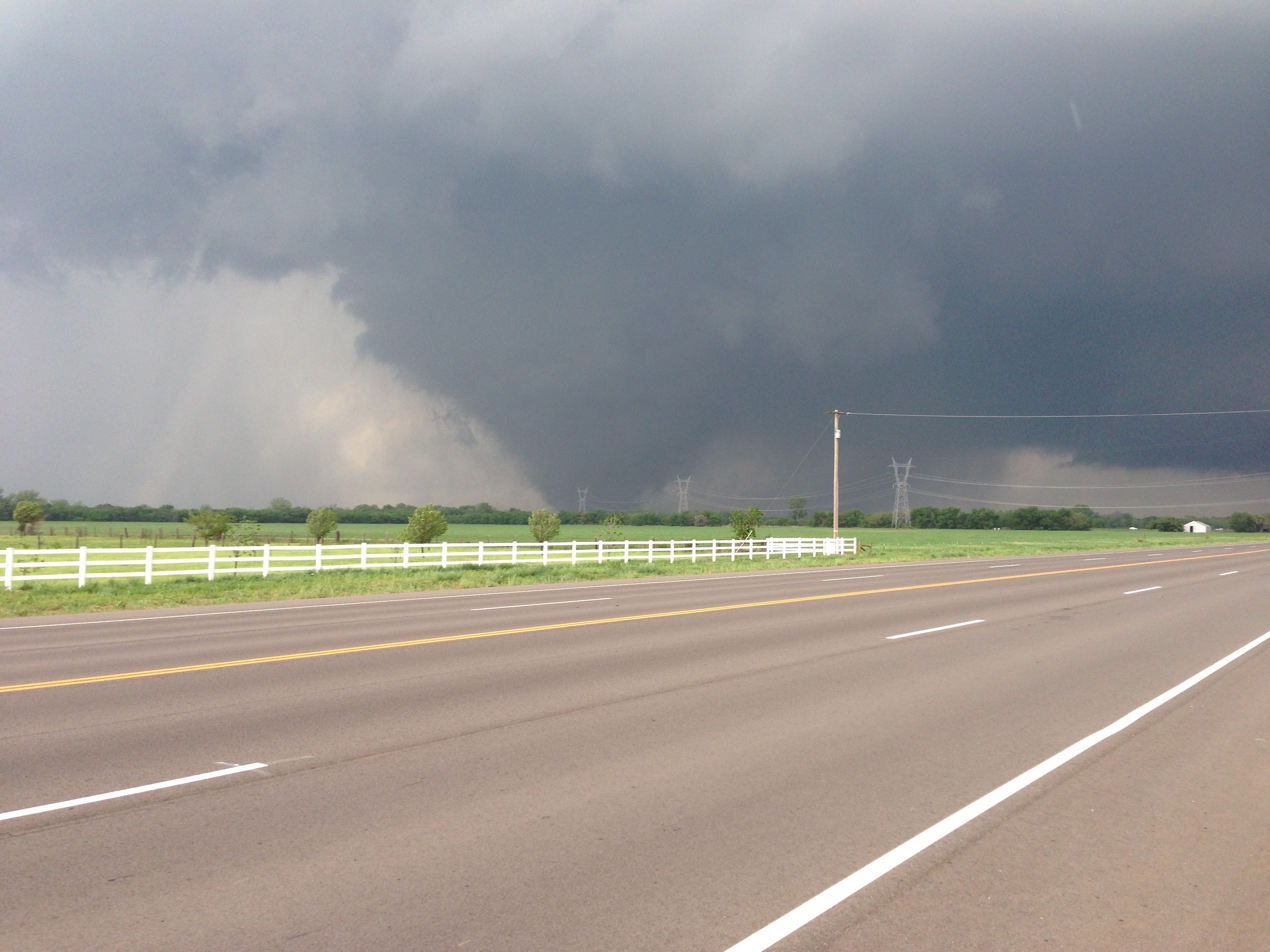
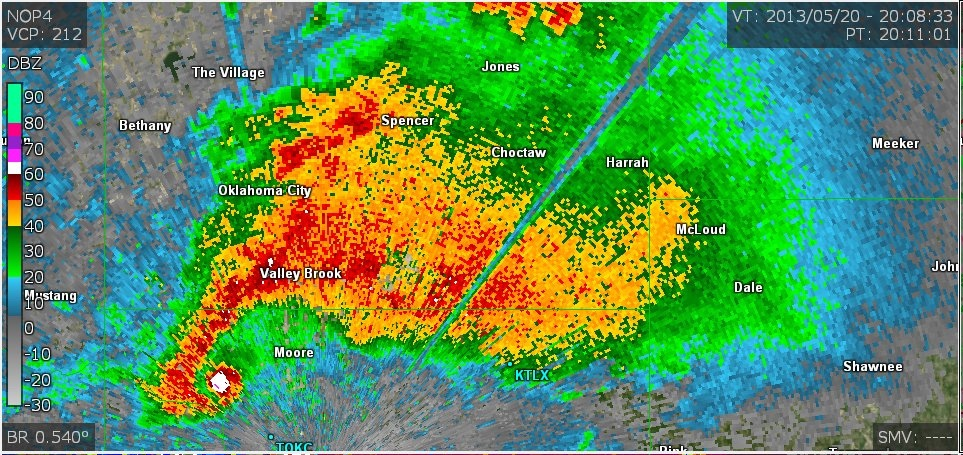
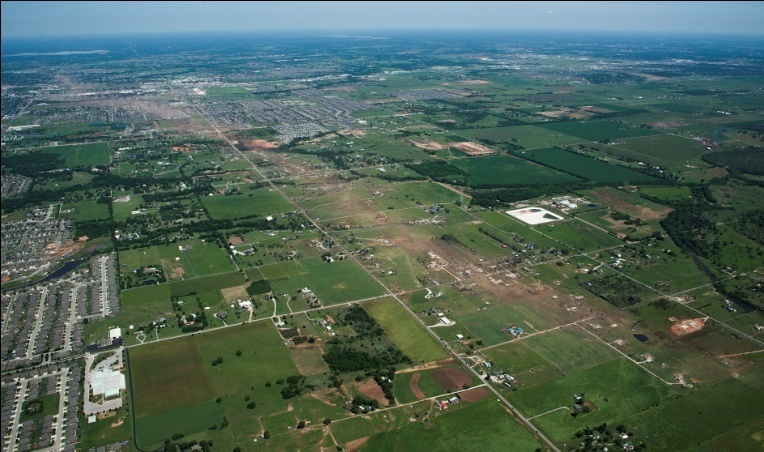
- Clockwise from top: The tornado as it was approaching the city of Moore; a cross honors one of the students killed at Plaza Towers Elementary School, which sustained very severe damage; aerial view of the damage to Moore; radar image of the tornado with a debris ball and hook echo signature

Meteorological history
- Formed: May 20, 2013, 2:56 p.m. CDT (UTC−05:00)
- Dissipated: May 20, 2013, 3:35 p.m. CDT (UTC−05:00)
- Duration: 39 minutes

EF5 tornado
- on the Enhanced Fujita scale
- Max width: 1,900 yards (1.1 mi; 1.7 km)
- Path length: 13.85 miles (22.29 km)
- Highest winds: 200–210 mph (320–340 km/h)

Overall effects
- Fatalities: 24 (+2 indirect)
- Injuries: 212
- Damage: $2 billion (2013 USD)
- Areas affected: McClain and Cleveland counties in Oklahoma; particularly the city of Moore
- Part of the Tornado outbreak of May 18–21, 2013 and Tornadoes of 2013

The 2013 Moore tornado was a large and extremely violent EF5 tornado that ravaged Moore, Oklahoma, and adjacent areas on the afternoon of May 20, 2013, with peak winds estimated at 200–210 mph (320–340 km/h), killing 24 people (plus two indirect fatalities) and injuring 212 others. The tornado was part of a larger outbreak from a slow-moving weather system that had produced several other tornadoes across the Great Plains over the previous two days, including five that had struck portions of Central Oklahoma the day prior on May 19.

The tornado touched down just northwest of Newcastle at 2:56 p.m. CDT (19:56 UTC), and quickly became violent, persisting for 39 minutes on a 13.85-mile (22.3 km) path through a heavily populated section of Moore, causing catastrophic damage of EF4 to EF5 intensity, before dissipating at 3:35 p.m. CDT (20:35 UTC) outside of Moore. The tornado was over one mile (1.6 km) across at its peak width. The 2013 Moore tornado followed a roughly similar track to the deadlier 1999 Bridge Creek–Moore tornado, which was rated F5; neither of the stricken schools in the area had acquired purpose-built storm shelters in the intervening years.

The tornado caused catastrophic damage around the city of Moore, with 1,150 homes destroyed as a result. Damage estimates ranged up to $2 billion, making it the costliest tornado since the Joplin EF5 tornado in 2011. Taking a path through the heart of Moore, an estimated 13,500 people were directly affected by the tornado. Large swaths of the city were completely destroyed and unofficial estimates placed the number of severely damaged or destroyed buildings at 1,500 with another 4,000 affected. In contrast to the violent nature of the tornado, the death toll was relatively low. The tornado was ranked as the ninth-deadliest tornado in the state's history. The lack of further fatalities was attributed to a 16-minute lead time on the Moore tornado given by the National Weather Service forecast office in Norman. Following the tornado, President Barack Obama declared a major disaster in Moore, ordering federal aid to the city, allowing recovery efforts to begin. The city would later adapt stronger building codes in response to the tornado, stricter than what is usually required in the United States. This was the most recent tornado to be rated EF5 until the 2025 Enderlin tornado in North Dakota, with a record EF5 drought of 12 years and one month in between such tornadoes. It is also the most recent F5/EF5 tornado to occur in the state of Oklahoma.

== Meteorological synopsis ==
On May 20, 2013, a prominent central upper trough moved eastward toward the Central United States, with a lead upper low pivoting over the Dakotas and Upper Midwest region. A Southern stream shortwave trough and a moderately strong polar jet moved east northeastward over the southern Rockies to the southern Great Plains and Ozarks area, with severe thunderstorms forming during the peak time of heating. With the influence of moderately strong cyclonic flow aloft, the air mass was expected to become unstable across much of the southern Great Plains, Ozarks, and middle Mississippi Valley by the afternoon. Evidence of an unstable air mass included temperatures in the low to mid 80s °F (27–30 °C), dewpoints that ranged in the upper 60s °F (20 °C) to the lower 70s °F (20–22 °C), and CAPE values ranging from 3500 to 5000 J/kg. Deep-layer wind shear speeds of 40 to 50 knots (46 to 58 mph) enhanced storm structure and intensity.

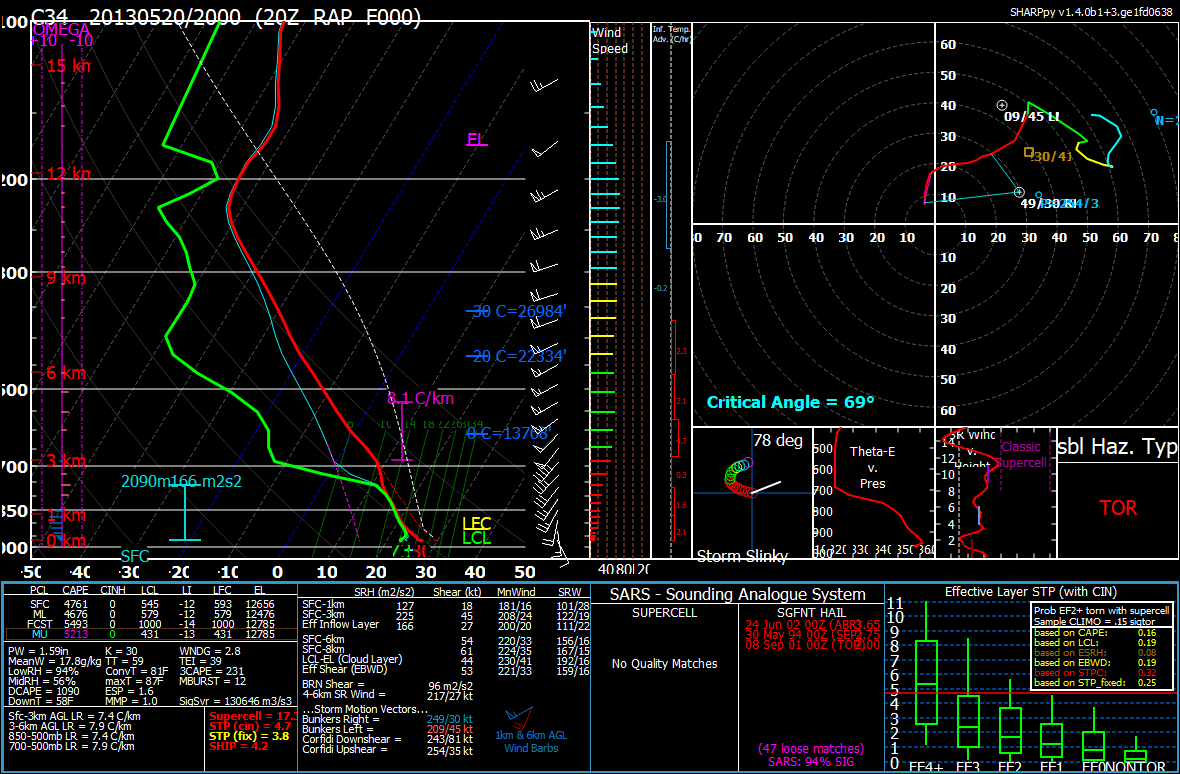
Modeled atmospheric sounding at the time of the tornado, from RAP. Note extreme MLCAPE values over 4500 j/kg, modest but adequate effective SRH exceeding 150, and anomalously strong low level instability (>200 j/kg 0-3km CAPE).

These were present ahead of a cold front extending from a surface low in the eastern Dakotas, southwestward to near the Kansas City area and western Oklahoma, and ahead of a dry line extending from southwest Oklahoma southward into northwestern and west-central Texas. Outflow remnants from the previous night and the early day convection across the Ozarks and the middle Mississippi Valley were a factor in severe weather development with the most aggressive heating and destabilization on the western edge of this activity across the southern Great Plains and just ahead of a cold front. The National Weather Service office in Norman, Oklahoma had warned as early as May 15 that there would be a possibility of severe weather on May 20.

The most intense severe weather activity was expected to come across the southern Great Plains, specifically Central Oklahoma, during the afternoon on that Monday. As such, the Storm Prediction Center issued a moderate risk of severe thunderstorms during the early morning of May 20 from southeastern Missouri to north-central Texas. The degree of wind shear, moisture, and instability within the warm sector favored the development of supercells. Very large hail and tornadoes were both expected with these supercells, with the possibility of a few strong tornadoes. The Storm Prediction Center issued a tornado watch at 1:10 p.m. Central Daylight Time (CDT) early that afternoon for the eastern two-thirds of Oklahoma, northwestern Arkansas, and portions of north-central Texas. Given the atmospheric parameters thought to be in place at the time, the Storm Prediction Center inadvertently underestimated the threat of tornadic activity that afternoon; the probability table for the tornado watch – the 191st severe weather watch issued by the guidance center in 2013 – indicated a 40% (or "moderate") probability of two or more tornadoes and a 20% (or "low") probability of one or more tornadoes reaching between EF2 and EF5 intensity within the watch area. The watch did, however, say that "one or two strong tornadoes" were possible.

== Development and track ==
Official track and intensity map of the tornado released by the National Weather Service (zoomable map) Key EF0 65–85 mph EF1 86–110 mph EF2 111–135 mph EF3 136–165 mph EF4 166–200 mph EF5 >200 mph

The thunderstorm that eventually produced the tornado developed less than one hour after the tornado watch was issued, around 2:00 p.m. CDT, across northern Grady County. Its rapid intensification resulted in the National Weather Service Weather Forecast Office in Norman issuing a severe thunderstorm warning for northern Grady, northwestern Cleveland, northern McClain, and southwestern Oklahoma Counties (including southwestern portions of the immediate Oklahoma City area) at 2:12 p.m. CDT. The thunderstorm quickly attained supercell characteristics, with rotation at the mid-levels of the storm's cloud structure becoming apparent even before it was officially classified as severe, due to the sufficient amounts of wind shear present over central Oklahoma.

Due to the expected intensity of the storms, three of the Oklahoma City market's five television news outlets − NBC affiliate KFOR-TV (channel 4), ABC affiliate KOCO-TV (channel 5) and CBS affiliate KWTV (channel 9) − suspended normal programming and went into wall-to-wall weather coverage immediately after the tornado watch went into effect. Fox affiliate KOKH-TV (channel 25) and Telemundo affiliate KTUZ-TV (channel 30) began their coverage as the first severe thunderstorms erupted southwest of the state capital and subsequently began relaying their audio feeds to radio stations throughout central Oklahoma. As the forecast suggested that the most significant severe weather would occur in the mid-afternoon, around the time classes concluded for the day, many worried parents began arriving at schools throughout Moore and south Oklahoma City to pick up their children in advance of the storms.

At 2:40 p.m. CDT, as rotation in the supercell was increasing at the cloud base, a tornado warning was issued for far northeastern Grady, western Cleveland, northern McClain, and southern Oklahoma Counties, as the storm approached the Oklahoma City metropolitan area. The rapid formation of the storm may have been associated with a descending reflectivity core and interplay of complex cell mergers.

=== Formation and initial intensification ===
Timelapse of the Moore tornado via radar images from its formation to dissipation. Note the large debris ball signature.

The tornado touched down at 2:56 p.m. CDT in northwestern McClain County, near Long Drive to the southwest of the North Country Club Road and SH-37 intersection, roughly 4.4 miles (7.1 km) northwest of downtown Newcastle. Initially a narrow rope-shaped tornado, it first caused EF1 damage to a home and some trees before crossing SH-37 and rapidly intensifying as it struck a semi-rural subdivision, where several homes were destroyed, two of which were leveled at EF4 intensity. At this point, the tornado began to grow rapidly in size over the course of 2 minutes; the rope-like funnel started to swell into a large stovepipe, before maturing further into a barrel shape. A debris ball grew around the funnel itself as it finally evolved into a large, wedge-shaped structure. Slight ground scouring began in this area, and several homes in a subdivision further to the northeast sustained EF3 damage. By 3:01 p.m. CDT, the National Weather Service issued a second, more strongly worded warning for the area: in a severe weather statement updating the existing tornado warning, the Norman forecast office declared a tornado emergency for southern Oklahoma City and Moore as various storm spotters confirmed that the large, violent tornado was approaching the area. The Twin Lakes dual-polarization NEXRAD radar (near Lake Stanley Draper) detected a tornado debris signature one mile in diameter within the accompanying hook echo, as the tornado crossed into portions of south Oklahoma City in northern Cleveland County. The supercell also produced straight-line winds of 80 miles per hour (130 km/h) for at least one mile surrounding the tornadic circulation.

=== South Oklahoma City ===
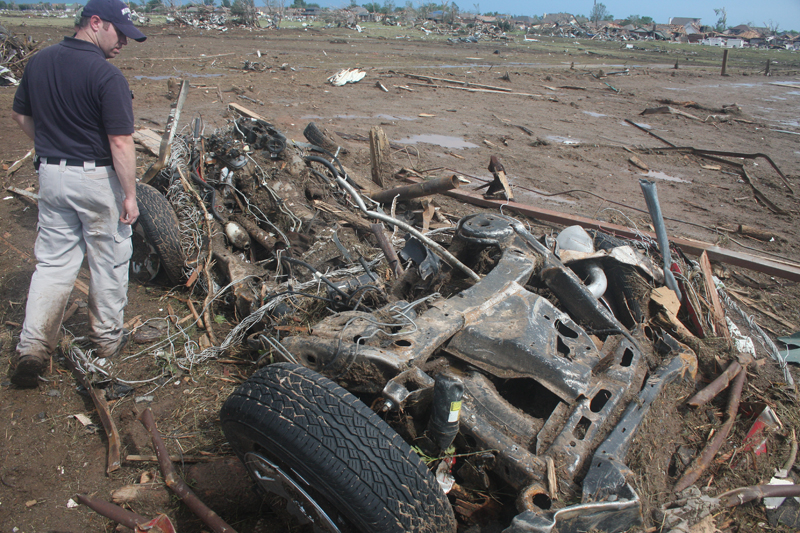
Extreme vehicle damage and ground scouring at the Celestial Acres horse training area

The tornado maintained at least EF3 intensity as it crossed the Canadian River into Cleveland County and a decommissioned US 62/US 277 bridge was severely damaged; most of this bridge had to be demolished after the tornado ripped part of it from its mount and tossed it across I-44/US 62/SH-37. The tornado then continued moving east-northeastward through the extreme southern portion of Oklahoma City towards Moore, roughly following Southwest 149th Street. At that point, it began to grow rapidly in width, and a second brief area of EF4 damage was noted near South May Avenue, where several homes were leveled, and one was swept clean from its foundation (this home was determined to have been nailed, rather than bolted to its foundation). A vehicle frame, engine block, and various other vehicle parts were found tangled within a grove of completely debarked trees in this area. As the tornado began to cross into south Oklahoma City, a traffic jam had occurred for a stretch of several miles along Santa Fe Avenue, as residents attempted to either escape from or pick up their children at schools located near the tornado's path. As the station's news helicopter was capturing live video of the tornado, then-KWTV chief meteorologist Gary England − upon seeing footage of the backup that was being relayed by pilot Jim Gardner − urged drivers caught in the jam that may have been listening to the station's audio simulcast on area radio outlets to use nearby streets to detour out of the tornado's expected track. The tornado weakened briefly to EF3 strength before re-intensifying to EF4 intensity near Forman Drive, flattening several homes as it moved through mostly rural areas south of Southwest 149th Street. As the tornado struck an oil production site, four oil tanks were blown away, one of which was never found. The others were thrown considerable distances; one was found a mile away.

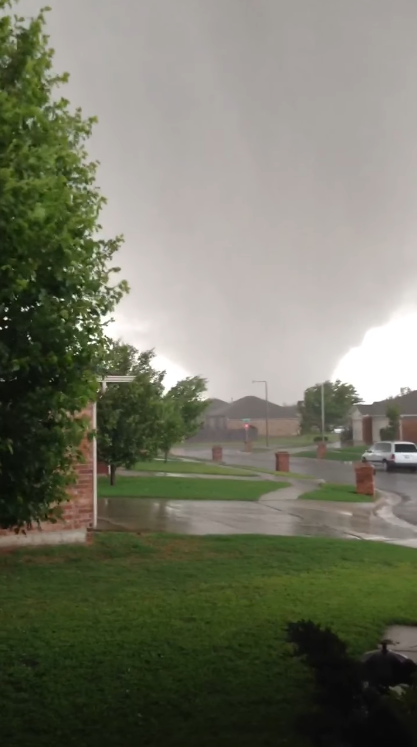
A still of a video captured by a resident as the tornado was entering Moore.

The tornado maintained its intensity as it struck the Orr Family Farm and the Celestial Acres horse training area, where up to 100 horses were reported killed, some being tossed into and tangled in downed power lines or thrown on top of nearby buildings; several horses that survived the tornado suffered severe injuries, with some being impaled by tree limbs or boards. Every building at Celestial Acres was either leveled or swept away at EF4 intensity, the ground on the property was scoured to bare soil, debris from structures was granulated, and vehicles were thrown and stripped down to their frames. Surveyors noted that based on the contextual damage, the tornado was likely at EF5 intensity in this area, though the construction quality of the affected buildings only permitted an EF4 rating. A 10-ton propane tank on the Orr Farm property was picked up and thrown more than a half-mile through the air by the tornado, and a strip mall near the farm was completely leveled as well. The tornado continued east, heavily scouring an open grassy field before impacting Briarwood Elementary School, which was completely destroyed. The NWS originally rated this damage EF5, but further evaluation and a 2014 study published by the American Meteorological Society revealed evidence of poor construction at the school, and the rating was downgraded to EF4. Overall, no fatalities occurred at the school. Two 12,000-gallon water tanks that were also swept off of the Orr Family Farm grounds were thrown into this area; the roof of Briarwood Elementary was struck by one of them − potentially aiding in compromising the building's structural integrity as it bent the steel girders that held up the roof − shortly before the main vortex struck the building, while the other fell onto and destroyed a home a few blocks east of the school. Past Briarwood Elementary, the tornado intensified even further and entered densely populated areas just west of Moore, including the Westmoor subdivision where many well-built, anchor-bolted brick homes were flattened at EF4 intensity, and two were swept clean from their foundations, with damage at those two homes rated EF5.

=== Moore ===
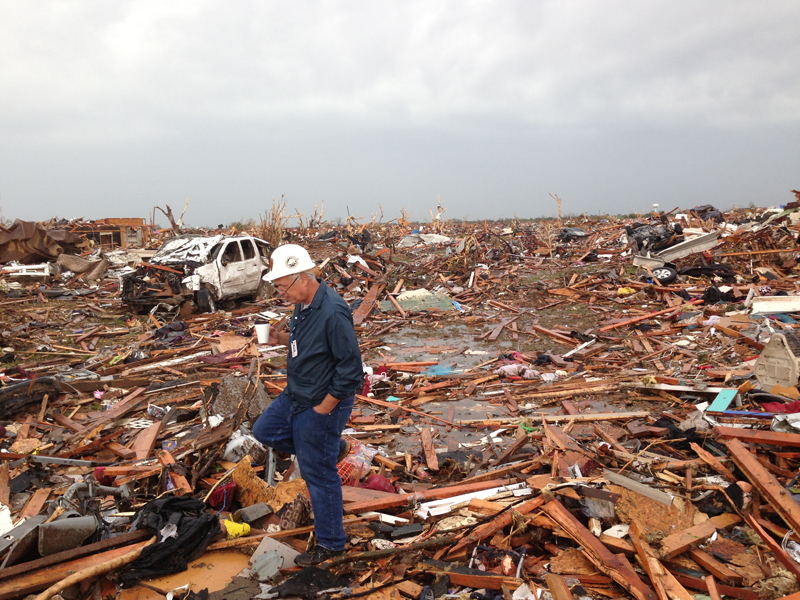
Meteorologist Tim Marshall surveys a neighborhood that was devastated

The tornado continued generally northeast at EF4 strength, completely debarking trees and leveling entire neighborhoods as it moved into the western city limits of Moore. Many homes were flattened in neighborhoods to the east of South Santa Fe Avenue. The tornado was initially rated EF5 in this area as only the bare slab of an anchor-bolted home remained. However, it was later downgraded to an EF4 as an inspection revealed the home's anchor bolts were missing their nuts and washers. The tornado then destroyed Plaza Towers Elementary School at EF4 intensity where seven children were killed when a cinder block wall collapsed on top of them. More than a dozen homes in a subdivision just to the south of Plaza Towers Elementary were completely swept away, all revealed to have been nailed rather than bolted to their foundations. Damage to this subdivision was subsequently rated EF4, though the tornado was possibly stronger than this rating suggests as lawns were completely scoured down to bare soil. Entire blocks of homes were flattened, trees were completely debarked and denuded, vehicles were thrown and mangled, and the ground was severely scoured in other residential areas nearby. The damage also earned an EF4 rating in these areas. Most of the fatalities from the tornado occurred in the Plaza Towers neighborhood of Moore. In one of these houses (a block away from Plaza Towers Elementary), a woman was killed as she tried to seek shelter in a closet.

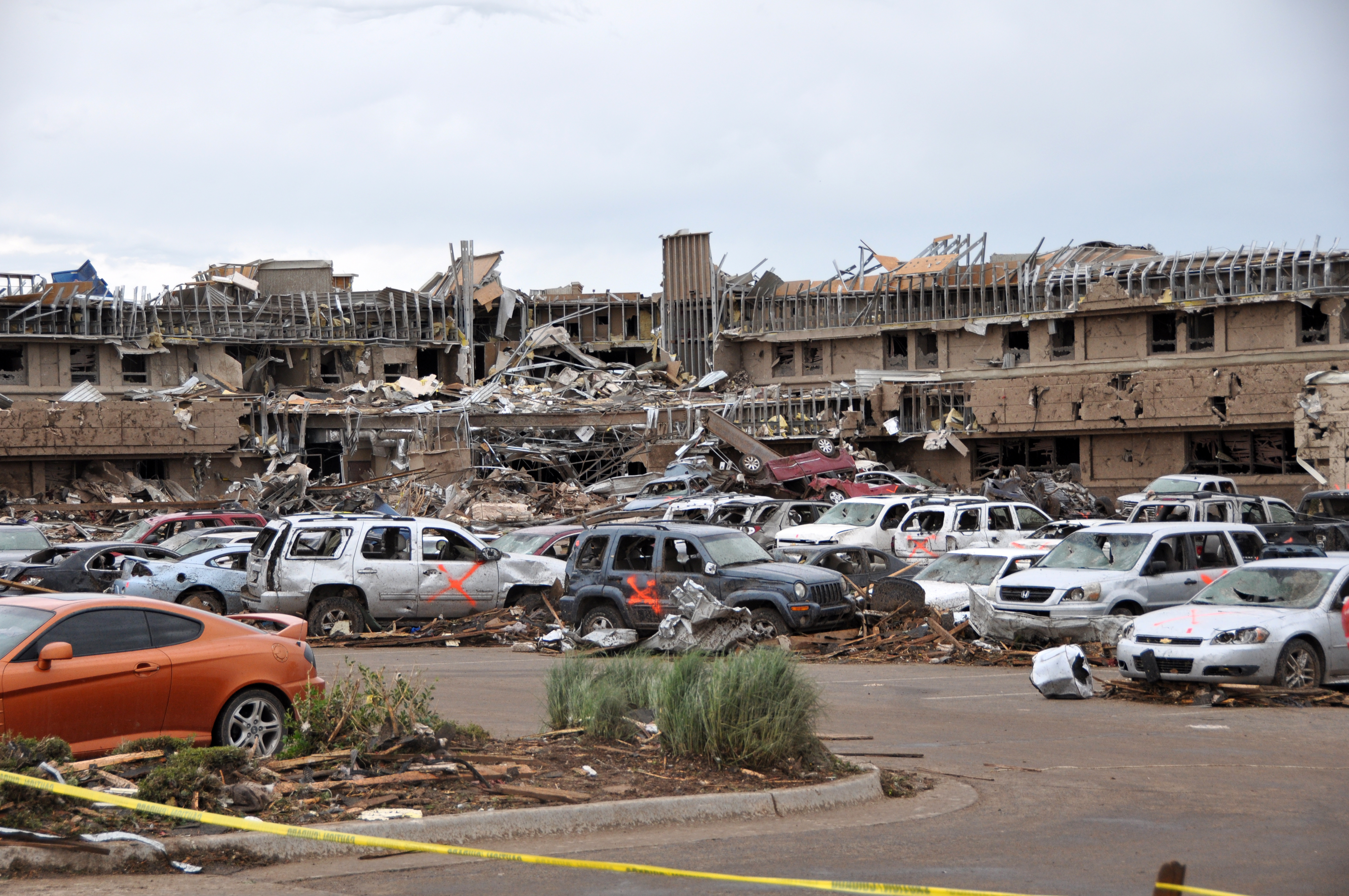
The Moore Medical Center and many vehicles left in ruins after the tornado

Further to the northeast, at least a dozen cars were piled up against the front entrance of the Moore Medical Center, which sustained EF4 damage. One car was lofted and thrown onto the roof. Many homes in neighborhoods near the medical center were completely destroyed, including a row of four well-built brick homes with anchor bolts that were swept away, with damage to those four homes rated EF5. An open field directly behind this row of homes was deeply scoured, with only bare soil and clumps of dirt remaining. A nearby manhole cover was removed, and multiple vehicles were mangled beyond recognition and caked in mud in this area as well. The nearby Warren Theater was spared a direct hit, but still sustained considerable damage to its exterior. A bowling alley in the area was leveled, and a 7-Eleven which was on the northern part of the damage path, was completely flattened with four people killed inside (including a three-month-old infant). The nearby Moore Cemetery was heavily damaged as well.

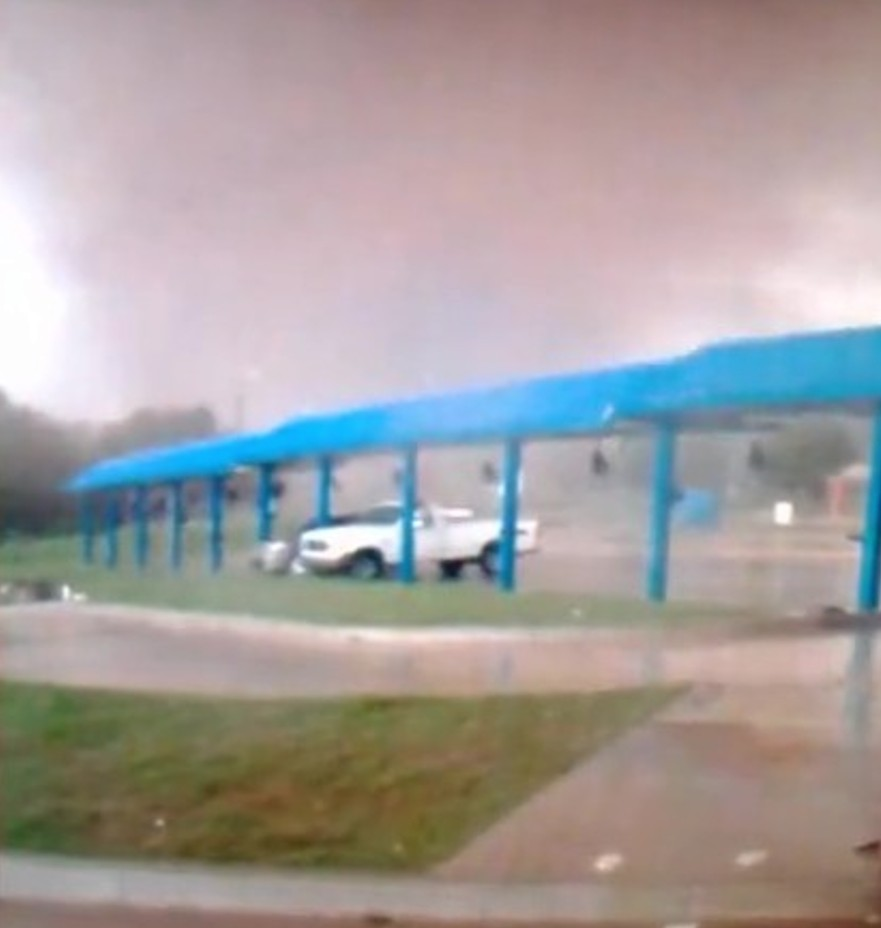
A still of the tornado captured by a Highland East Jr. High school security camera

The tornado briefly weakened and caused EF3 damage to some other businesses near I-35/US 77, before crossing the interstate and mangling several vehicles in the process. The tornado regained EF4 intensity on the other side of the Interstate as it tore through several neighborhoods and destroyed numerous additional homes (though the EF4 damage swath was narrower at this point). A large grassy field between two subdivisions in this area was scoured to bare soil, with wind-rowed structural debris and several mangled vehicles strewn to the east. One brick home on Hunters Glen Court sustained EF5 damage, with only the slab foundation and anchor bolts remaining. Very little structural debris or house contents was recovered from that residence, and the small number of debris that remained was wind-rowed well away from the site. Two vehicles were also lofted from the residence, one of which was thrown over 100 yards (91 m). The tornado continued through Moore's eastern neighborhoods. Highland East Jr. High's main building was spared, but the separate gymnasium building was completely destroyed, and a set of lockers from the structure was lofted and thrown a considerable distance into a nearby neighborhood. The Moore Public Schools administration building, a converted former hospital located a few blocks to the east, was also struck and destroyed.

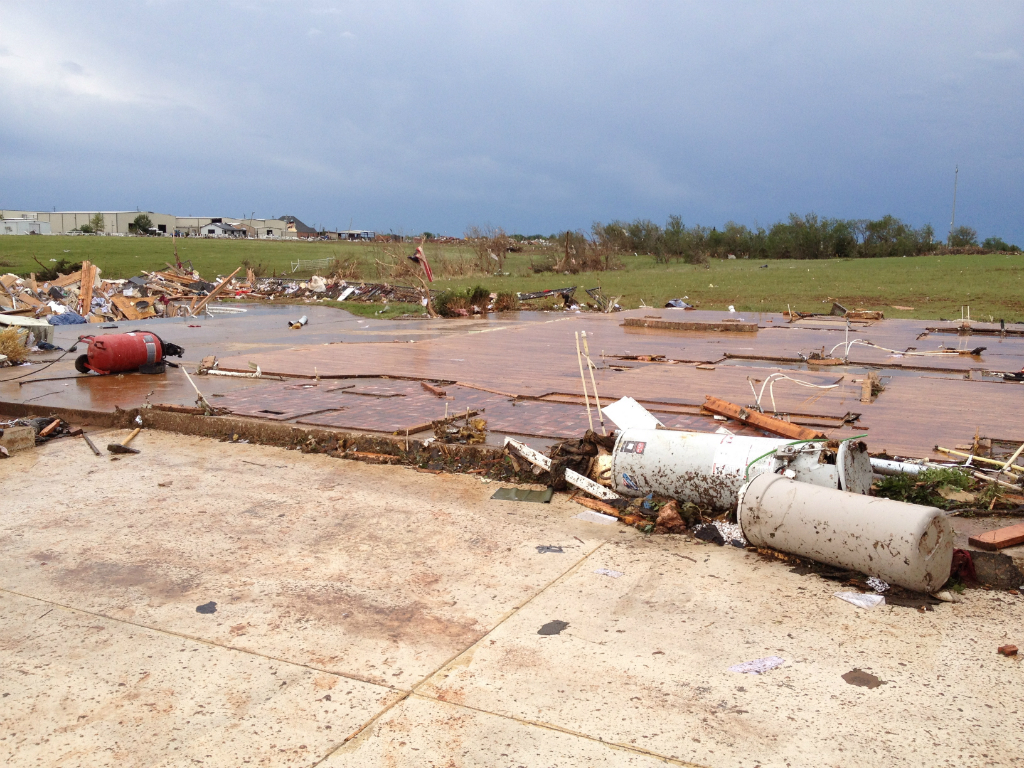
A large, well-built home that sustained EF5 damage in eastern Moore

The tornado was noticeably narrower at this point, but was still causing a continuous swath of EF4 damage to numerous homes as it moved through multiple subdivisions. A well-built, anchor-bolted home at the corner of Heatherwood Drive and Southeast 5th Street was reduced to a bare slab, sustaining EF5 damage. A large, well-bolted-down home at the end of a private drive off of Southeast 4th Street (SH-37) was also swept cleanly away at EF5 intensity. Debris was scattered well away from the site, a vehicle was thrown over 100 yards (91 m), and wind-rowing was again noted at that location.

=== Weakening and dissipation ===
Further east, the tornado weakened to EF3 strength as it exited Moore, destroying six industrial buildings and damaging two others. A final small area of EF4 damage was noted nearby as two homes and a concrete building were leveled. The tornado then began to rapidly narrow and weaken, snapping and uprooting several trees and causing EF2 damage to a farm just east of Moore, where the house lost its roof and an outbuilding was destroyed. A pickup truck slid 200 feet (61 m) away from the farm into a field while remaining upright. At 3:35 p.m. CDT, the tornado dissipated at a nearby tree line about one-third mile (0.54 km) east of South Air Depot Boulevard. The tornado traveled a total of 13.85 miles (22.3 km) over 39 minutes, moving at an average rate of 21 miles per hour (34 km/h). It reached a maximum width of 1,900 yards (1,737 m).

The violent updrafts in the supercell that produced the tornado lofted debris from homes and other buildings in Moore at least 10 miles (16 km) outside of the tornado's outer circulation, with reports of various objects and personal possessions being found as far away as Midwest City.

== Impact ==
=== Damages ===
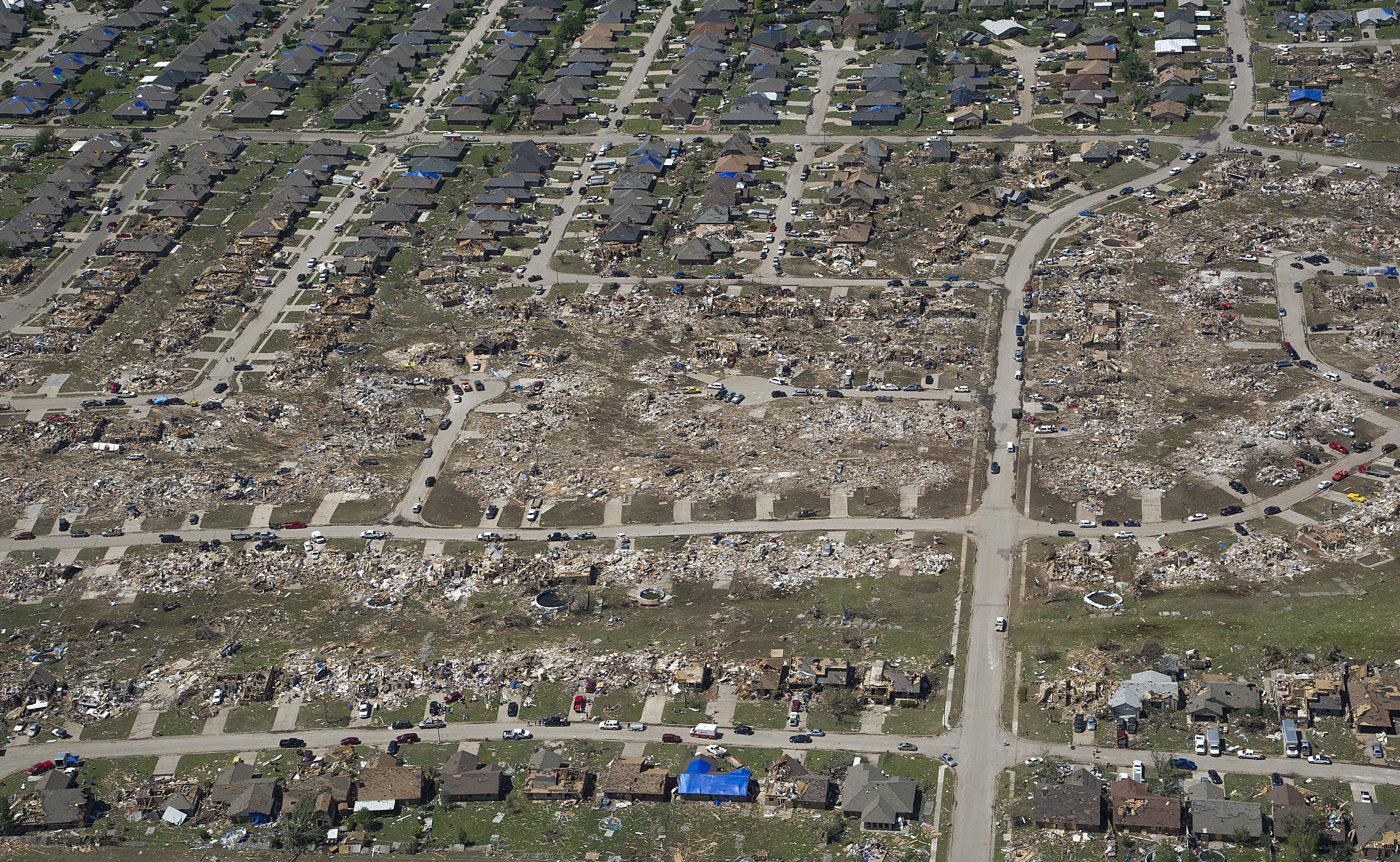
An aerial view of destroyed homes in Moore, taken by the Oklahoma National Guard

The Oklahoma Department of Emergency Management reported that 25 people were killed (with another death indirectly attributed to the tornado). The Oklahoma Medical Examiner recognizes 25 fatalities. An estimated 1,150 homes were destroyed, resulting in an estimated $2 billion in damages. The number of injured was 377. Entire subdivisions were obliterated, and houses were flattened in a large swath of the city. The majority of a neighborhood just west of the Moore Medical Center was destroyed. Witnesses said the tornado more closely resembled "a giant black wall of destruction" than a typical twister.

=== Briarwood Elementary School ===
Among the hardest hit areas were two public schools: Briarwood Elementary School and Plaza Towers Elementary School. A preliminary study of Briarwood Elementary School conducted in September 2013 by a group of structural engineers found some structural deficiencies that led to its collapse during the tornado. Chris Ramseyer, a structural engineer and an associate professor at the University of Oklahoma determined that the building's walls that were not reinforced with concrete, there had been a lack of connection between the masonry walls and support beams in several portions of the building, and anchor bolts were pulled from the ground by the tornado. Another engineer that was involved in the study stated that the deficiencies that Ramseyer pointed out were not uncommon building practices at the time, and that current building code standards would not ensure that Briarwood would have withstood winds in excess of 200 miles per hour (320 km/h).

=== Plaza Towers Elementary School ===
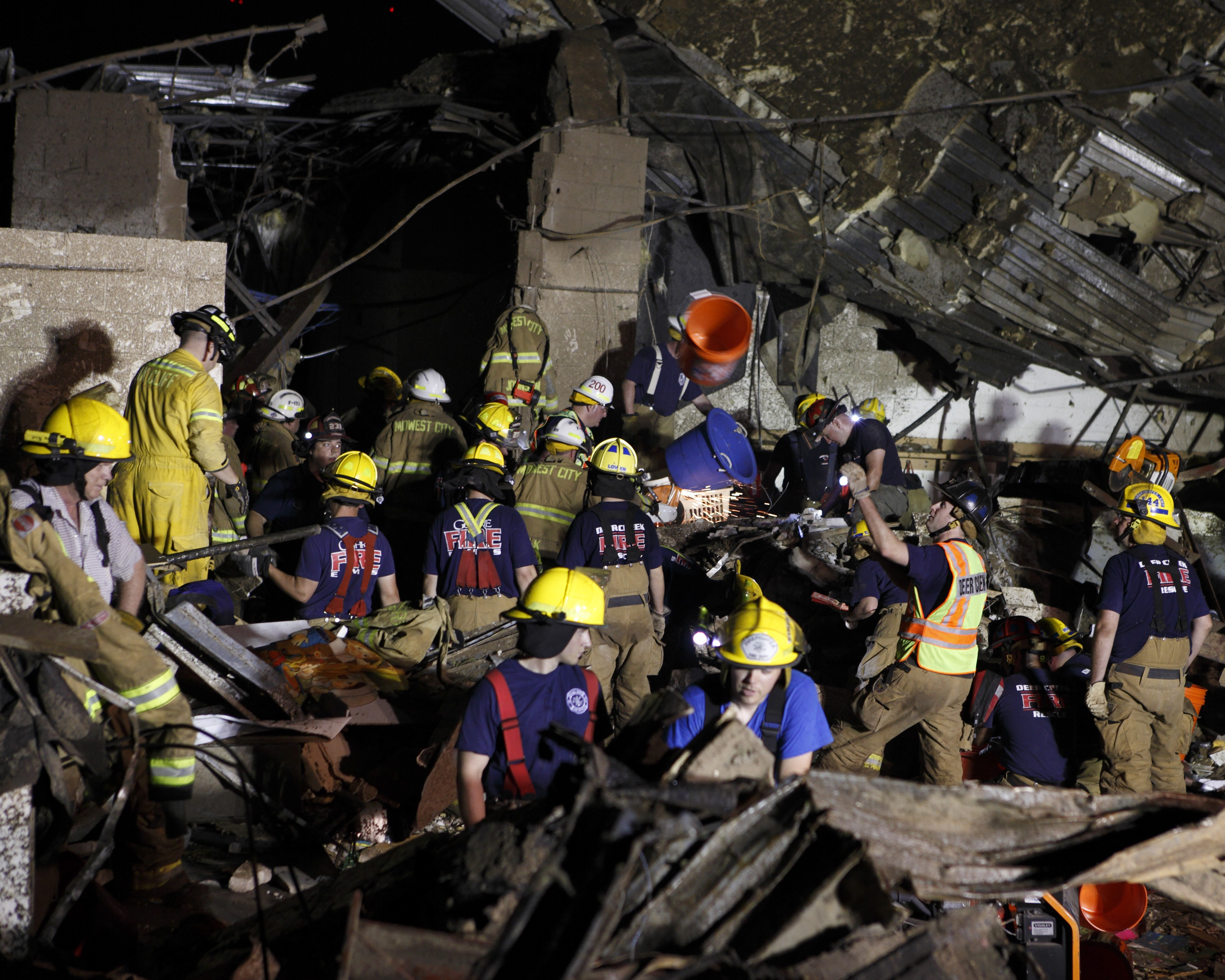
Over a dozen emergency workers comb through the rubble of Plaza Towers Elementary School

At Plaza Towers, the second school to be hit, parents had been allowed to collect their children early in preparation for the oncoming storm. Therefore, by the time the tornado struck only about 75 students and teachers were in the building. Many students and teachers took shelter in bathrooms and closets, but in a newer addition to the building which housed the school's second and third grade classrooms, seven fatalities occurred. Third grade teacher Jennifer Doan was taking shelter with eleven of her students in a hallway when the tornado struck. Doan and her students were trapped when the walls of the corridor collapsed on top of them. Doan, who was two months pregnant with her third child at the time, suffered severe injuries to her back, but did not lose the baby. She and five of her students were pulled out, with the children suffering only minor to moderate injuries. Another six of her students along with a student from another third-grade class died.

=== Other regions ===
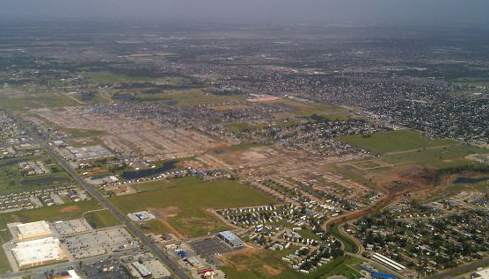
Damage from the tornado still evident one month later

The Moore Medical Center was heavily damaged, but no one present in the building was injured by the tornado. The center's staff had to relocate 30 patients to a hospital in Norman and another hospital. Part of I-35 was shut down due to debris that had been thrown onto the freeway. On May 21, Moore still did not have running water. There were more than 61,500 power outages related to the tornado. More than 100 people were rescued from areas that sustained significant damage from the tornado.

The Oklahoma Department of Insurance estimated that insurance claims for damage would likely be more than $1 billion. Some meteorologists estimated that the energy released by the storm could have been eight to more than 600 times greater than the atomic bomb dropped on Hiroshima.

=== Casualties ===
In addition to erroneous reports concerning the status of Briarwood and Plaza Towers students, various reports regarding fatality and injury counts as well as persons unaccounted for were circulated by traditional and social media outlets in the immediate time after the tornado struck, which could not immediately be confirmed or refuted due to communications disruptions in the affected areas or were the result of incorrect counting due to miscommunication of estimates. Within the first two days, it was reported that between 237 and 240 people had been injured, with the tally later increasing to over 350. The final count of injuries was later adjusted downward to 212.

On the morning of May 21, the medical examiner's office incorrectly stated that 91 bodies of tornado victims had been received. This number was up from the earlier report of 51 bodies that were incorrectly stated as having been received. Upon the office's discovery that some victims were mistakenly counted twice due to communication errors made by Moore rescue response units that the bodies were admitted to area funeral homes (nearly all of the deceased were actually transported to the examiner's office in Oklahoma City), the actual number was revised downward and later confirmed at 24 tornado victims. The number was later increased to 25, with one indirect victim. The first two deaths occurred in a house in the Westmoor subdivision east of Briarwood Elementary School; the next was a homeless person who was standing at the intersection of SW 144th St and Santa Fe Avenue; seven occurred following a wall collapse at Plaza Towers Elementary; nine occurred in the neighborhood immediately west of Plaza Towers Elementary between SW 10th Street and SW 14th Street, including one on SW 6th Street near Telephone Road; three occurred at a 7-Eleven Gas Station at the SW 4th Street and Telephone Road intersection, including a young mother and her newborn baby and a gas station employee; one occurred in the neighborhood alongside the east side of Interstate 35; and one occurred in a home that was destroyed between Eastern Avenue and Bryant Avenue. The medical examiner's office increased the death toll to 25 after a 90-year-old woman who suffered a fractured skull during the tornado died on August 1. On May 6, 2018, nearly five years after the tornado, a 14-year-old survivor who suffered posttraumatic stress disorder after losing seven of his friends at Plaza Towers Elementary School committed suicide.

Patients were taken to Integris Southwest Medical Center and The Children's Hospital at OU Medical Center in Oklahoma City. Over 140 patients, including at least 70 children, were treated at hospitals.

== Aftermath ==
=== Initial aid ===
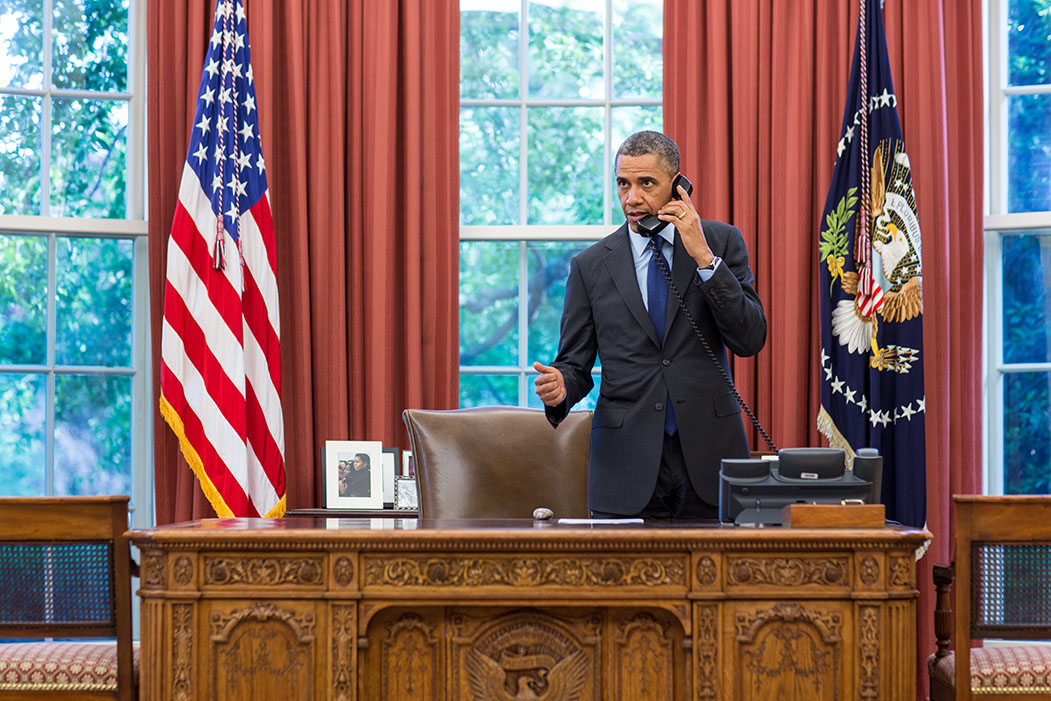
President Barack Obama talks on the phone to Oklahoma Governor Mary Fallin in the Oval Office

Oklahoma Governor Mary Fallin declared a state of emergency on May 20. She held her first post-tornado news conference at noon on May 21. The Federal Emergency Management Agency deployed urban search and rescue teams to the tornado-hit areas, and provided incident command personnel to organize and support rescue efforts. The Oklahoma National Guard was also deployed. Governor Mary Fallin requested assistance from then-President Barack Obama who declared a major disaster in the state and ordered federal aid to the affected areas. Governor Fallin quickly dismissed an idea to make a law that would require all schools in Oklahoma to have a shelter that would protect children during severe weather (prior to the tornado, only two of the twelve schools in the Moore Public Schools district had storm shelters, Kelley Elementary and Westmoore High School, which were rebuilt with concrete safe rooms after both were destroyed in the 1999 Bridge Creek–Moore tornado).

Cleveland, Lincoln, McClain, Oklahoma, and Pottawatomie Counties received federal funding for hazard mitigation measure statewide. Obama visited the disaster-stricken areas on May 26.

Governor Mary Fallin stands with a family that survived the devastating Moore tornado

At noon on May 21, the U.S. Senate held a moment of silence for the victims. Delegates from several countries and Pope Francis offered condolences, and the United Nations offered assistance in the recovery efforts. The Canadian Red Cross accepted donations of money and supplies for their American counterparts to assist with disaster relief and recovery.

The United Methodist Committee on Relief, Direct Relief, Matt Kemp of the Los Angeles Dodgers, Kevin Durant of the Oklahoma City Thunder, Continental Resources, Devon Energy, ONEOK, Koch Industries, Hobby Lobby, and Carrie Underwood all pledged donations to the relief efforts.

Moore Mayor Glenn Lewis stated that he would attempt to get an ordinance passed requiring storm shelters or safe rooms in new housing projects.

=== Television changes and documentary specials ===
The third season finale of the sitcom Mike & Molly, titled "Windy City", was pulled by CBS from its original May 20 airdate within hours of the event due to the episode featuring a plotline involving a tornado descending on Chicago; the network later rescheduled the episode to air ten days later on May 30, 2013.

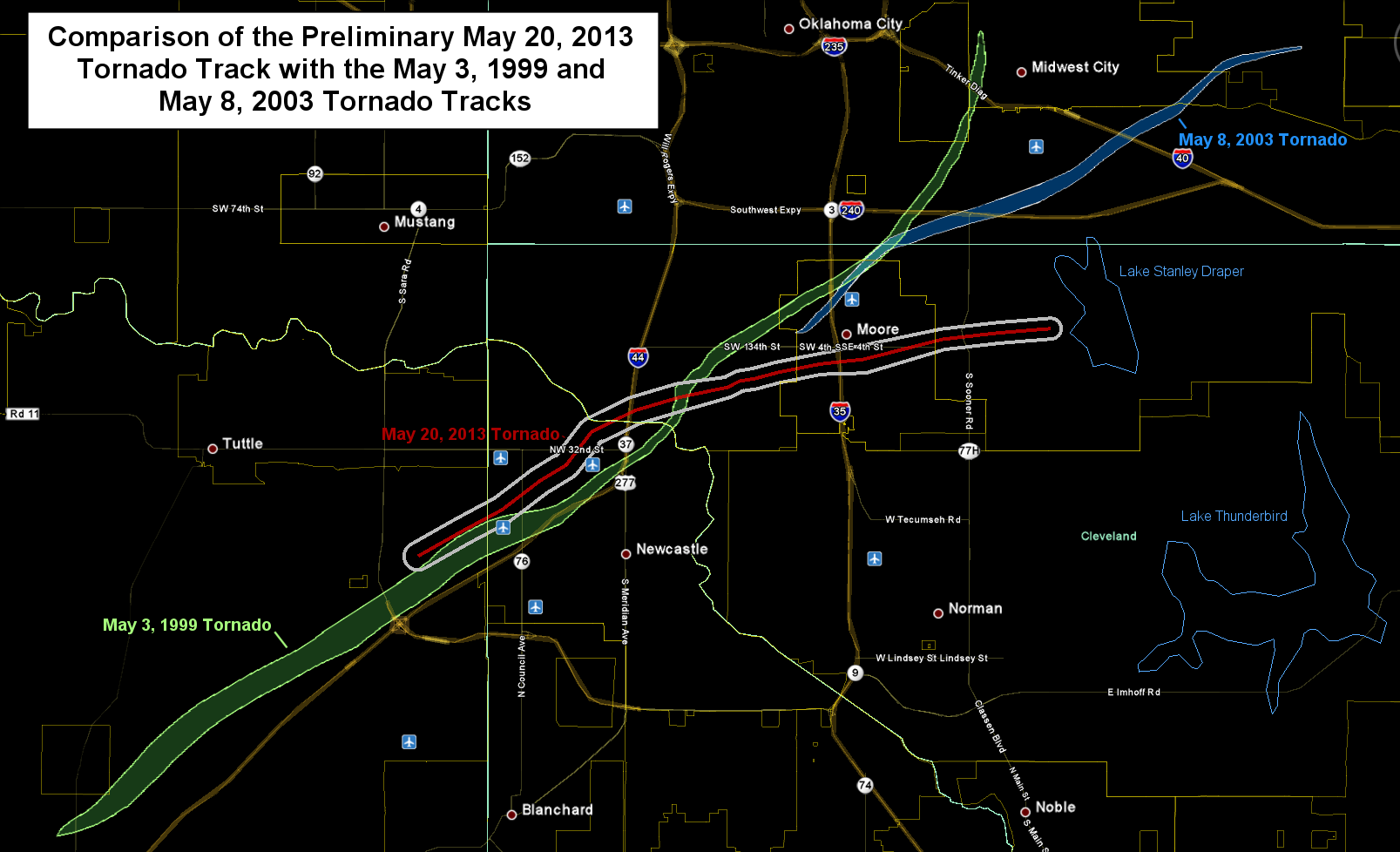
An NWS preliminary comparison of the tracks of the 2013 Moore tornado (red), the 1999 Bridge Creek–Moore tornado (green), and the 2003 Moore–Choctaw tornado (blue)

On May 29, 2013, NBC aired Healing in the Heartland: Relief Benefit Concert, a fundraising concert that was held at Chesapeake Energy Arena in downtown Oklahoma City. The benefit was hosted by country singer and Oklahoma native Blake Shelton and featured performances from Miranda Lambert, Vince Gill, Reba McEntire, Rascal Flatts, Usher, Darius Rucker and Luke Bryan. The concert raised more than $6 million for the United Way of Central Oklahoma.

On June 2, 2013, Discovery Channel aired an hour-long documentary about the storm titled Mile-Wide Tornado: Oklahoma Disaster. The documentary provides a comprehensive look at the tornado's impact and drew comparisons of the storm to the 1999 Bridge Creek-Moore tornado.

The Moore City Council proposed a measure making twelve changes to its residential building codes, include requiring that new home construction in the city include hurricane clips or framing anchors, continuous plywood bracing and wind-resistant garage doors in order for homes to withstand winds up to 135 miles per hour (217 km/h) (equivalent to a high-end EF2 tornado). When the measure was passed in a unanimous vote held on March 17, 2014, Moore became the first city in the United States to adopt a building code addressing the effects of tornadoes on homes, which exceed the national standards set by the National Association of Home Builders.

== See also ==
- List of tornadoes in Cleveland County, Oklahoma
- List of notable media in the field of meteorology
- Tornado outbreak sequence of May 2003 – a tornado outbreak that spawned an F4 tornado that struck similar areas almost ten years earlier
- Tornado outbreak of May 10–13, 2010 – a tornado outbreak that spawned an EF4 tornado that struck nearby areas three years earlier
