= 1998 Oklahoma tornado outbreak =

Weather event in Oklahoma, United States

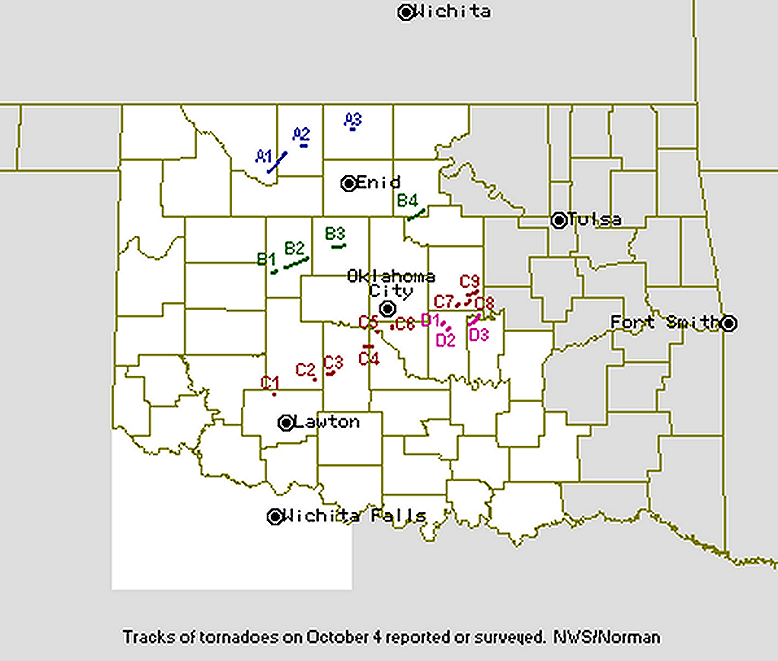
- Tornadoes that touched down in the NWS Norman area. Seven more touched down in the NWS Tulsa area.

Meteorological history
- Formed: October 4, 1998

Tornado outbreak
- Tornadoes: 26
- Max. rating: F3 tornado
- Highest winds: 90 mph (140 km/h) in Ponca City, Oklahoma
- Largest hail: 2.75 in (7.0 cm) in diameter in 3 different locations

Overall effects
- Injuries: 11
- Areas affected: Oklahoma
- Part of the tornado outbreaks of 1998

The 1998 Oklahoma tornado outbreak was a tornado outbreak that affected the state of Oklahoma on October 4, 1998. 26 tornadoes touched down, making this event the largest autumnal tornado outbreak in state history.

== Confirmed tornadoes ==
Confirmed tornadoes by Fujita rating
FU	F0	F1	F2	F3	F4	F5	Total
0	10	7	8	1	0	0	26

List of confirmed tornadoes – Sunday, October 4, 1998 (Note: All dates are based on the local time zone where the tornado touched down; however, all times are in Coordinated Universal Time for consistency.)
F#	Location	County / Parish	State	Start Coord.	Time (UTC)	Path length	Max width	Summary
F2	SSW of Dacoma to NW of Carmen	Woods, Alfalfa	OK	36.52°N 98.65°W	19:25–19:43	10 mi (16 km)	440 yd (400 m)	An abandoned home was damaged, and a barn and garage were destroyed south of Dacoma. The tornado then moved into Alfalfa County where it destroyed an office building and a gas plant. A mobile home adjacent to the gas plant lost most of its roof.
F0	SE of Cherokee	Alfalfa	OK	36.70°N 98.28°W	20:05	0.1 mi (0.16 km)	25 yd (23 m)	An Alfalfa County Sheriff's Deputy saw this brief tornado as it tracked over a small part of the salt flats of Salt Plains National Wildlife Refuge. No damage occurred.
F0	W of Medford	Grant	OK	36.82°N 97.82°W	21:04	0.1 mi (0.16 km)	25 yd (23 m)	A state trooper saw this brief tornado touch down very close to OK 11. No damage occurred.
F0	SW of Watonga	Blaine	OK	35.77°N 98.52°W	21:38-21:41	1.5 mi (2.4 km)	25 yd (23 m)	A storm chaser caught this brief tornado on video. No damage occurred.
F2	SW of Watonga to SE of Hitchcock	Blaine	OK	35.82°N 98.45°W	21:50-22:12	12 mi (19 km)	200 yd (180 m)	Three homes were significantly damaged, with one having its roof removed.
F0	N of Medicine Park	Comanche	OK	34.80°N 98.50°W	22:14	0.3 mi (0.48 km)	50 yd (46 m)	An Oklahoma Highway Patrol officer saw a brief tornado. No damage occurred.
F1	S of Dover	Kingfisher	OK	35.92°N 98.00°W	22:28-22:42	7 mi (11 km)	100 yd (91 m)	A haybarn was destroyed, five barns were damaged, and one home was also damaged. Powerlines and trees were downed along the path.
F0	NE of Cyril	Caddo	OK	34.90°N 98.18°W	22:45	0.5 mi (0.80 km)	25 yd (23 m)	Some minor roof damage occurred on the far northeastern side of Cyril. Powerlines and trees were knocked down.
F1	WNW of Stillwater	Payne, Noble	OK	36.12°N 97.25°W	22:47-22:56	6 mi (9.7 km)	100 yd (91 m)	This tornado tracked over parts of Lake Carl Blackwell in Payne County, and Lake McMurtry in Noble County. A mobile home was severely damaged after the tornado moved off of Lake McMurtry.
F1	Pawnee	Pawnee	OK	36.33°N 96.80°W	23:38-23:39	0.4 mi (0.64 km)	125 yd (114 m)	On the southwest side of Pawnee, a brief tornado destroyed a mobile home, and minorly damaged at least 50 homes. This minor damage included roofing, windows, and porches.
F2	NW of Blanchard to SSW of Newcastle	Grady, McClain	OK	35.17°N 97.58°W	00:15-00:18	3 mi (4.8 km)	100 yd (91 m)	Several mobile homes and outbuildings were damaged north of Middleberg. A mobile home was completely destroyed, and two others were blown over in the Bridge Creek area.
F0	N of Newcastle to WSW of Moore	McClain, Cleveland	OK	35.30°N 97.60°W	00:26-00:27	1.5 mi (2.4 km)	33 yd (30 m)	Damage was primarily limited to trees.
F2	Moore	Cleveland	OK	35.33°N 97.50°W	00:34-00:41	3 mi (4.8 km)	580 yd (530 m)	Many homes lost portions if not all of their roofs, and one home lost a portion of an exterior wall. Some warehouses also lost sections of roofing.
F0	S of Barnsdall	Osage	OK	36.55°N 96.17°W	00:56-00:57	1 mi (1.6 km)	75 yd (69 m)	Three barns and two outbuildings were destroyed. Four homes had minor damage. Numerous large tree branches were snapped.
F2	ESE of Meeker	Lincoln	OK	35.47°N 96.85°W	01:37-01:40	3 mi (4.8 km)	580 yd (530 m)	Three homes just south of US 62 had significant roof damage, and an RV was pushed over. Along the highway, trees and a home had light damage. Another home along the path had roof and porch damage.
F2	WNW of Prague	Lincoln	OK	35.48°N 96.80°W	01:45-01:52	6 mi (9.7 km)	580 yd (530 m)	A mobile home had light damage at the start of the path. A mobile home along US 62 was destroyed. Debris from the mobile home was scattered to the northwest about 150 yd (140 m). Slight tree and outbuilding damage occurred as the tornado moved northeast before it dissipated.
F1	WNW Shawnee	Pottawatomie	OK	35.37°N 96.95°W	01:50-01:55	3 mi (4.8 km)	100 yd (91 m)	Extensive tree damage occurred at a private golf course. The clubhouse at the golf course sustained minor damage to its roof and the air-conditioning unit. A mobile home was destroyed.
F1	N of Prague	Lincoln	OK	35.55°N 96.77°W	01:52-02:08	8 mi (13 km)	440 yd (400 m)	A mobile home was lifted and thrown about 100 yd (91 m), uprooting a power pole while it was airborne. The mobile home was destroyed, with the six people who took shelter inside sustaining injuries. As the tornado crossed OK 99, a mobile home sustained minor damage, three outbuildings were destroyed, some logs at a sawmill were tossed, and trees were knocked down.
F1	Shawnee	Pottawatomie	OK	35.33°N 96.92°W	01:58-02:00	2 mi (3.2 km)	100 yd (91 m)	This tornado developed very close to if not in the downtown area of Shawnee. Many homes had minor roof and structural damage, and trees and powerlines were knocked down.
F0	SSE of Nowata to NNE of New Alluwe	Nowata	OK	36.63°N 95.62°W	02:05-02:16	8 mi (13 km)	50 yd (46 m)	A barn was destroyed, an old school building was destroyed, and a mobile home lost most of its roof. Debris from the mobile home's roof was wrapped around trees as far as over 100 yd (91 m) away. Afterwards, the tornado then crossed Lake Oologah. After coming off the lake, a shed was destroyed, a home and barn were damaged, and several trees were knocked down. This tornado was observed by a trained spotter as it was north of New Alluwe. It dissipated shortly after.
F3	WNW of Little to SE of Prague	Seminole, Pottawatomie	OK	35.38°N 96.77°W	02:08-02:17	6 mi (9.7 km)	880 yd (800 m)	This was the strongest tornado of the outbreak. It touched down west-northwest of Little, where only minor tree damage occurred. As the tornado moved northeast, it increased in size to its peak width of a 0.5 mi (0.80 km) wide. Numerous outbuildings were heavily damaged, and trees were snapped. On the north side of the tornado's path, three mobile homes were slightly damaged, and three other homes had minor roof single damage. As the tornado crossed I-40 it blew over a truck carrying hazardous materials. Further to the northeast, a mobile home lost its roof, multiple outbuildings were destroyed, and trees were damaged before the tornado crossed the North Canadian River into Pottawatomie County. After crossing the river, a barn was partially unroofed. The small community of Center View was hit, mainly on its south and east side. As the tornado crossed OK 99, a home lost its roof and most of its exterior walls. Five other homes nearby suffered major to significant damage. Further northeast, another home suffered significant roof damage, the south-facing brick wall was buckled, and the garage was destroyed. Steel and cinder-block debris from the garage impaled a tree. Additional tree and outbuilding damage occurred along the path before the tornado lifted. In all, about 60 homes or businesses were damaged or destroyed.
F0	NW of Collinsville	Tulsa	OK	36.40°N 95.87°W	02:19	0.5 mi (0.80 km)	50 yd (46 m)	Several trained spotters reported this tornado. No damage occurred.
F2	SE of Boley to SW of Nuyaka	Okfuskee, Okmulgee	OK	35.48°N 96.45°W	02:37-03:04	27 mi (43 km)	1,408 yd (1,287 m)	This was the widest and longest-tracked tornado of the outbreak. In IXL, nearly every structure in the small community was damaged in some form. A home and two mobile homes were destroyed, with debris from one of the mobile homes being found a 0.5 mi (0.80 km) away. Four businesses and a public building at the local park were also destroyed. Six homes and two mobile homes were destroyed, and 21 homes and a mobile home sustained minor damage. In the Haydenville area, north of Okemah on OK 56, two homes and a mobile home were destroyed. Three homes, three mobile homes, and the Haydenville fire station suffered major damage. Five homes and a store sustained minor damage. Just southwest of the Haydenville area, a mobile home was completely destroyed. Four people inside the mobile home suffered injuries. In Okmulgee County, only minor tree damage occurred before the tornado lifted. Surveys done by the National Weather Service Tulsa, Oklahoma found evidence that smaller satellite tornadoes circulated around the larger tornado. The tornado itself was around 0.8 mi (1.3 km) wide at its widest point, with the damage width reaching around 3 mi (4.8 km) wide at times due to the smaller satellite tornadoes rotating around the larger one.
F1	E of Nuyaka	Okmulgee	OK	35.65°N 96.10°W	03:17-03:18	1 mi (1.6 km)	100 yd (91 m)	A storm chaser doing an aerial survey found damage path through the Okmulgee Wildlife Management Area just east of Nuyaka. Damage was limited to trees being blown over.
F0	SE of Tullahassee	Wagoner	OK	35.82°N 95.42°W	04:27	0.8 mi (1.3 km)	50 yd (46 m)	One home had roof damage, and many trees were damaged in a forested area. This was produced by the same thunderstorm that produced the F2 tornado in Okfuskee and Okmulgee Counties.

== See also ==
- Tornadoes of 1998
- List of North American tornadoes and tornado outbreaks
