= Moore, Oklahoma =

City in Oklahoma, US

- City
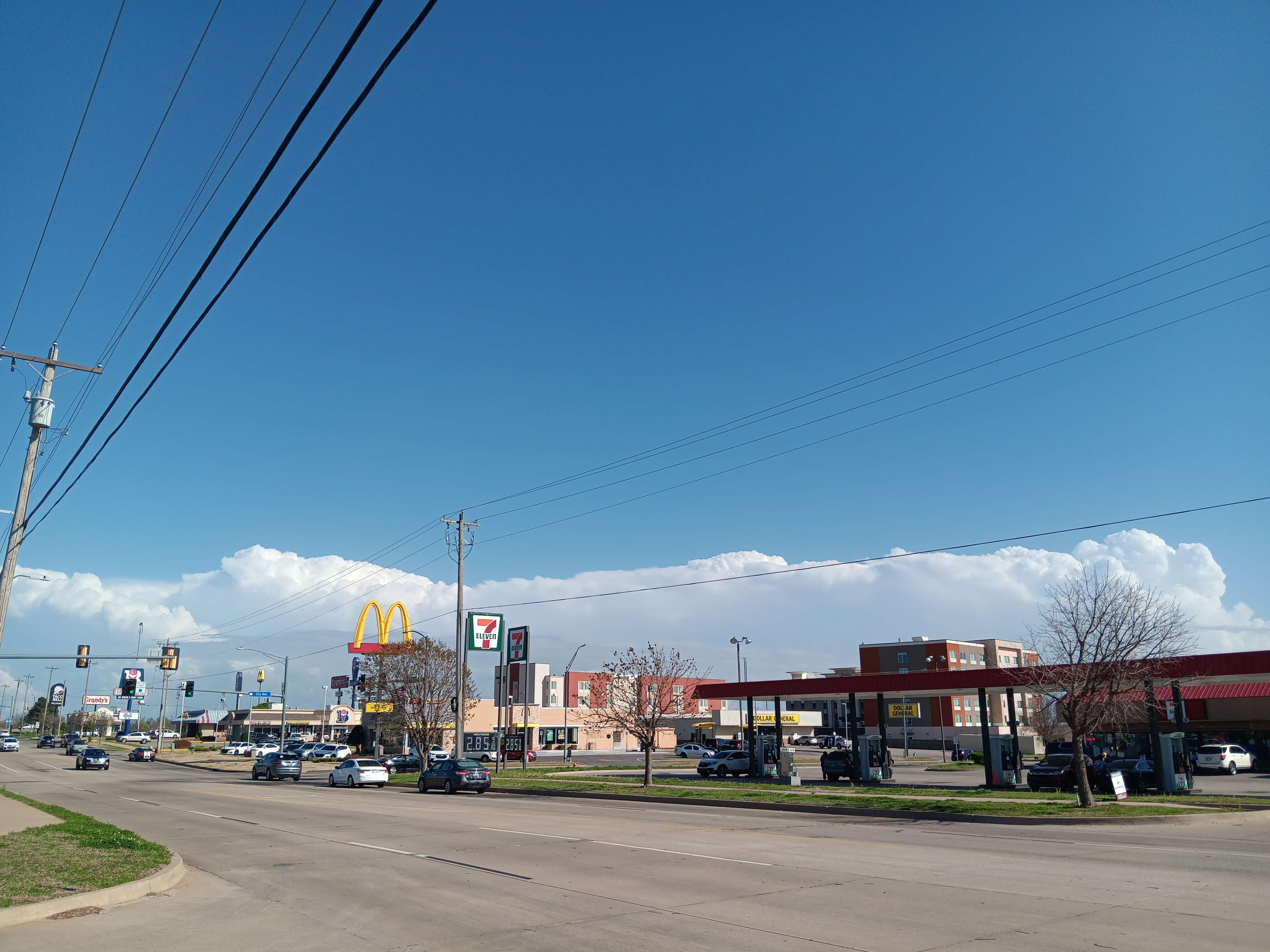
- Moore, Oklahoma in 2024

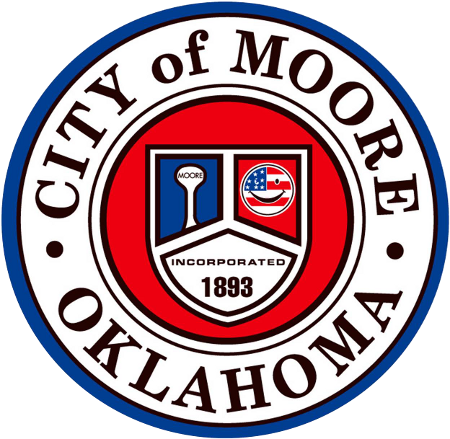
- Seal

- Location within Cleveland County and Oklahoma
- Coordinates: 35°20′18″N 97°29′12″W
- Country: United States
- State: Oklahoma
- County: Cleveland
- Founded: 1889
- Incorporated: 1893

Government
  - Mayor: Mark Hamm
  - City Manager: Brooks Mitchell

Area
  - Total: 22.34 sq mi (57.86 km^{2})
  - Land: 22.09 sq mi (57.21 km^{2})
  - Water: 0.25 sq mi (0.64 km^{2})
- Elevation: 1,207 ft (368 m)

Population (2020)
  - Total: 62,793
  - Density: 2,842.5/sq mi (1,097.49/km^{2})
- Time zone: UTC−6 (Central (CST))
  - Summer (DST): UTC−5 (CDT)
- ZIP codes: 73160, 73165, 73170
- Area codes: 405/572
- FIPS code: 40-49200
- GNIS feature ID: 2411155
- Website: cityofmoore.com

Moore is a city in Cleveland County, Oklahoma, United States, and is part of the Oklahoma City metropolitan area. The population was 62,793 at the 2020 census, making Moore the seventh-largest city in the state of Oklahoma.

Located between Oklahoma City and Norman, the city has been the site of several devastating tornadoes, with those occurring in 1999 and 2013 receiving international attention. The 3 costliest tornadoes in Oklahoma history all occurred in Moore.

== History ==
The Moore post office was established May 27, 1889, during the Land Run of 1889 and was named for Al Moore, an Atchison, Topeka and Santa Fe Railway employee. According to the town history he was a "conductor or a brakeman, lived in a boxcar at the camp and had difficulty receiving his mail. He painted his name – "Moore" – on a board and nailed it on the boxcar. When a postmaster was appointed, he continued to call the settlement Moore. When the town incorporated in 1893 the name was legalized."

The city's history notes that the community before the post office may have been called "Verbeck" by the railroad. However, other histories indicate that Verbeck was actually the original name of the nearby telegraph station "Oklahoma" which became the basis for the founding of Oklahoma City.

The community remained small until 1961, when it annexed 21.6 square miles (56 km^{2}), becoming a full-fledged city in 1962, which in turn increased its population from 1,221 in 1960 to 18,761 in 1970 and 55,081 in 2010. Moore's 1961 annexation kept it an independent city at a time when Oklahoma City through annexations increased its size from 25 square miles (65 km^{2}) to 643 square miles (1,670 km^{2}) surrounding Moore on three sides (north, east, west). Norman forms its southern border.

In 1966 the Hillsdale Free Will Baptist College, after moving through various locations around Oklahoma, opened in the community.

The Moore post office turned into a branch of the Oklahoma City post office on January 7, 1972.

In the 1970s the city launched a "Smile America" campaign in which giant red, white and blue smileys were painted on the town water towers. A smiley also adorns the city's official logo (as does a water tower). Some of the water towers now have a sign that says, "Moore - Home of Toby Keith."

On September 24, 2014, at the local Vaughan Foods food processing plant, one employee was beheaded with a knife and another coworker had her throat slit and was injured, but survived. The alleged attacker, 30-year-old Alton Nolen, who was on suspension from the plant prior to the attack due to interactions with the employee who survived the attack, was shot and wounded by company owner Mark Vaughan. Nolen was convicted of murder and assault in October 2017. A jury recommended that he receive the death penalty, and, on December 15, 2017, a judge sentenced Nolen to death by lethal injection.

== Geography ==
Moore is located just south of Oklahoma City and north of Norman, in central Oklahoma. According to the United States Census Bureau, the city has a total area of 22.2 square miles (57.4 km^{2}), of which 21.8 square miles (56.5 km^{2}) is land and 0.35 square miles (0.9 km^{2}), or 1.52%, is water.

The city lies in the Sandstone Hills region of Oklahoma, known for hills, blackjack oak, and post oak.

== Climate ==
Moore has a humid subtropical climate (Köppen: Cfa) with frequent variations in weather during part of the year and consistently hot summers. Prolonged and heavy rainfall often leads to flash flooding. Consistent winds, usually from the south or south-southeast during the summer, help temper the hotter weather. Consistent northerly winds during the winter can intensify cold periods. Severe ice storms and snowstorms happen sporadically during the winter.

Climate data for Moore
Month	Jan	Feb	Mar	Apr	May	Jun	Jul	Aug	Sep	Oct	Nov	Dec	Year
Mean daily maximum °C (°F)	10.1 (50.2)	11.6 (52.9)	17.5 (63.5)	22.1 (71.8)	26.4 (79.5)	31.4 (88.5)	34.1 (93.4)	33.9 (93.0)	29.6 (85.3)	22.9 (73.2)	16.4 (61.5)	10.7 (51.3)	22.2 (72.0)
Daily mean °C (°F)	4.3 (39.7)	5.7 (42.3)	11.7 (53.1)	16.3 (61.3)	21.1 (70.0)	26.2 (79.2)	28.6 (83.5)	28.2 (82.8)	23.8 (74.8)	16.9 (62.4)	10.5 (50.9)	5.2 (41.4)	16.5 (61.8)
Mean daily minimum °C (°F)	−0.8 (30.6)	0.4 (32.7)	6.2 (43.2)	10.8 (51.4)	16.1 (61.0)	21.1 (70.0)	23.2 (73.8)	22.8 (73.0)	18.3 (64.9)	11.6 (52.9)	5.3 (41.5)	0.5 (32.9)	11.3 (52.3)
Average precipitation mm (inches)	21.2 (0.83)	27.0 (1.06)	31.6 (1.24)	46.6 (1.83)	71.3 (2.81)	57.2 (2.25)	41.8 (1.65)	37.1 (1.46)	37.6 (1.48)	39.4 (1.55)	22.3 (0.88)	24.0 (0.94)	457.1 (17.98)
Source: Weather.Directory

=== Tornado history ===
The Oklahoma City metropolitan area (of which Moore is a part) is located in Tornado Alley and is subject to frequent and severe tornadoes and hailstorms, making it one of the most tornado-prone major metropolitan areas in the world. Due to this, Moore is sometimes considered the Tornado Capital of either the United States or the world.

Moore itself has seen nine tornadoes between 1998 and 2015, three of them big enough to claim lives and cause catastrophic damage. The city of Moore was damaged by significant tornadoes on October 4, 1998; May 3, 1999; May 8, 2003; May 10, 2010; and May 20, 2013, with weaker tornadoes striking at other times, notably May 31, 2013 and March 25, 2015. Moore is located in Tornado Alley, a colloquial term for the area of the United States where tornadoes are most frequent. About 20 tornadoes occurred in the immediate vicinity of Moore from 1890 to 2013. The most significant tornadoes to hit Moore occurred in 1893, 1999, and 2013.

To warn residents of tornadoes, 45 outdoor warning sirens have been densely installed throughout Moore.

==== 1999 tornado ====
During the tornado outbreak on May 3, 1999, a tornado hit Moore and nearby areas. The tornado, which was rated an F5 on the Fujita scale, was the most costly tornado in history at the time (not adjusted for changes in inflation and population). The tornado had an approximate recorded wind speed of 321 mph (517 km/h) as sampled by mobile Doppler radar, the highest wind speed ever recorded on Earth. It left a swath of destruction over 1 mile (1.6 km) wide at times, and 38 miles (60 km) long. It killed a total of 36 people in the Oklahoma City metropolitan area.

==== 2013 tornado ====
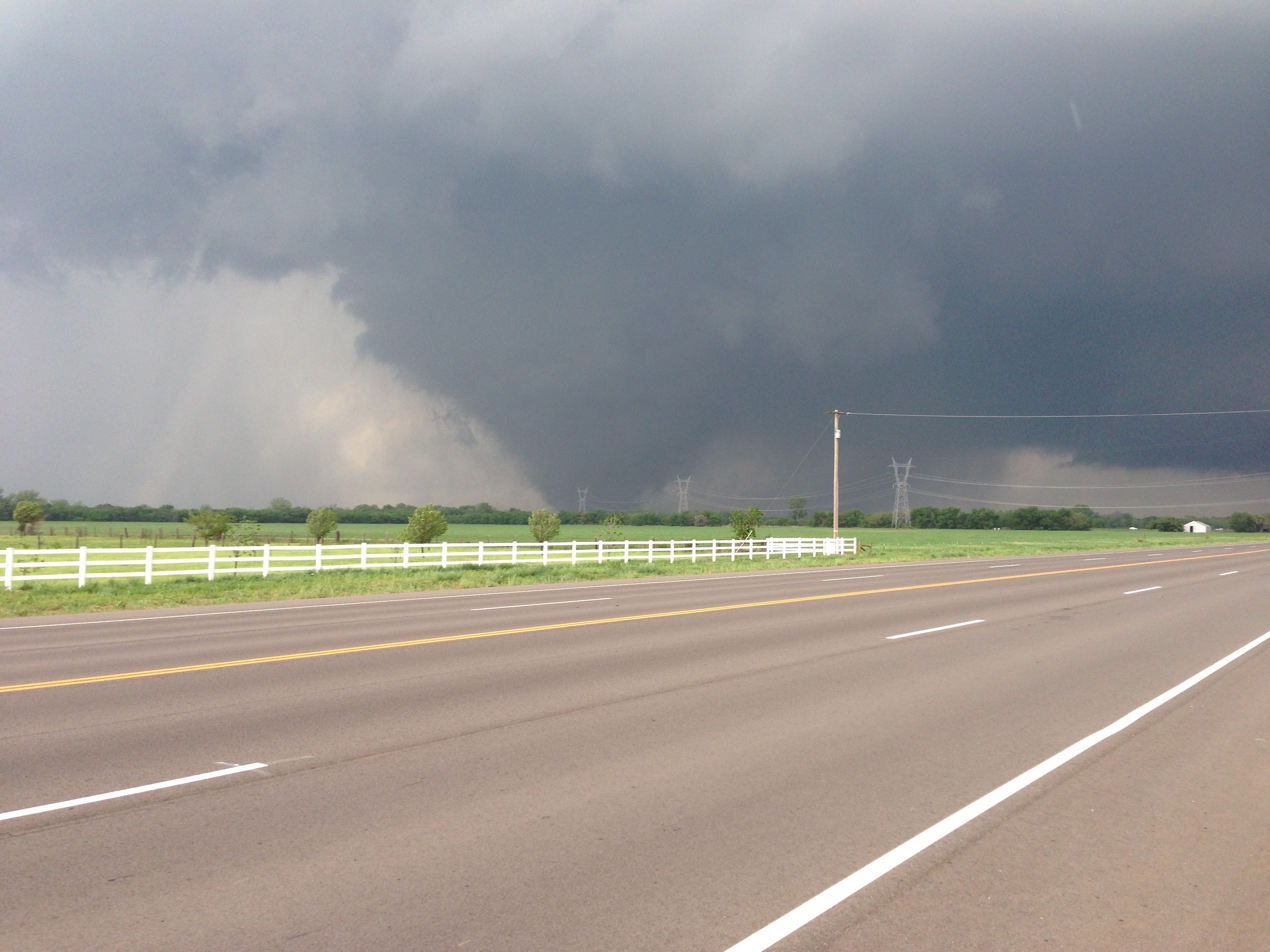
2013 tornado southwest of Moore

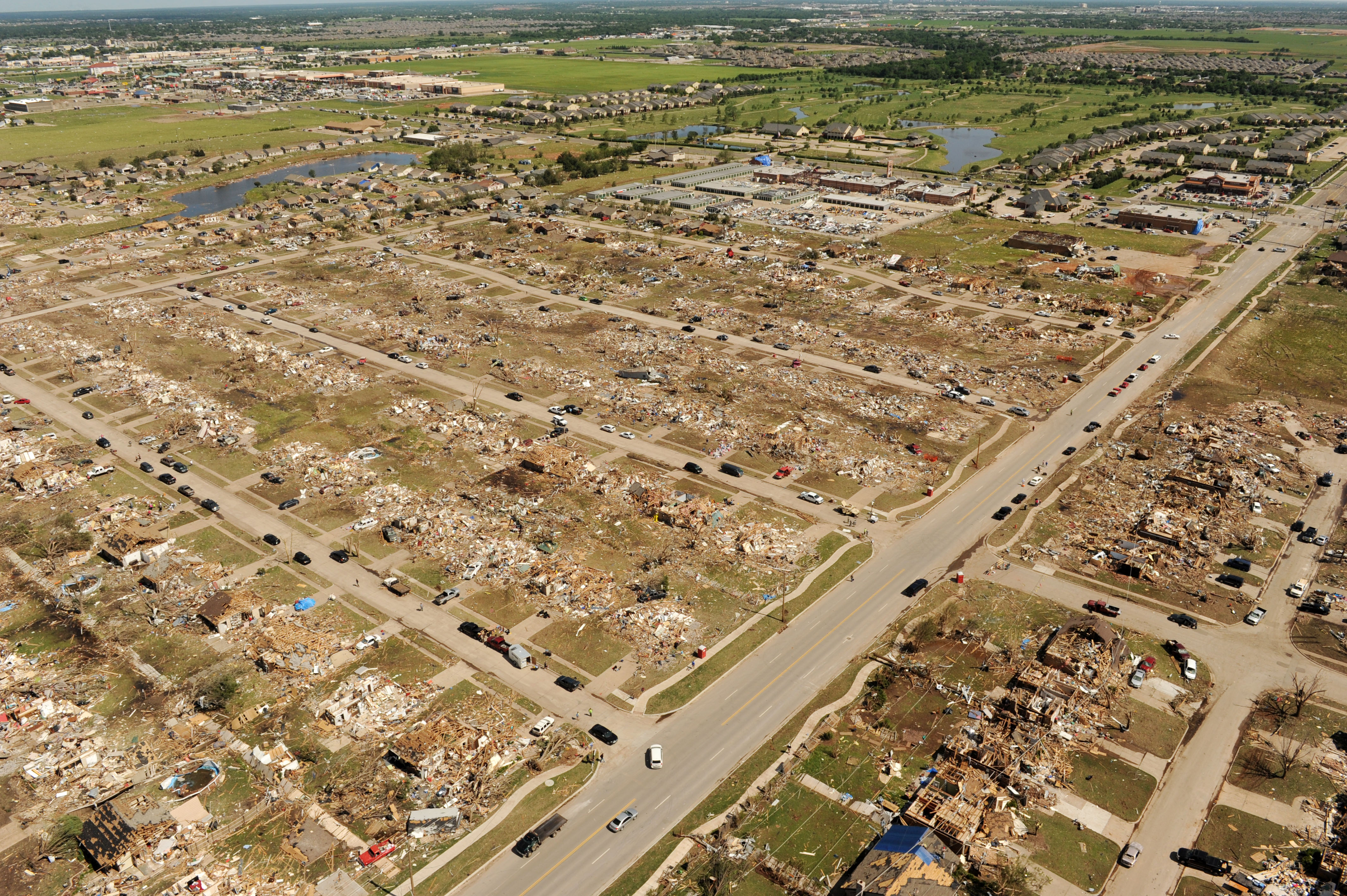
Aerial view of 2013 Moore tornado damage

On May 20, 2013, parts of Moore and neighboring Newcastle and southern Oklahoma City, were affected by a violent tornado. Classified as EF5 on the Enhanced Fujita scale, it had estimated wind speeds of 200–210 mph (320–340 km/h), a maximum width of 1.1 miles (2 km), and a path length of 17 miles (30 km). Entire subdivisions were destroyed; the tornado struck Briarwood and Plaza Towers elementary schools in Moore while school was in session. The Oklahoma Medical Examiner's office reported that 24 people were killed, including 10 children. Over 140 patients, including at least 70 children, were treated at hospitals following the tornado. It was the deadliest U.S. tornado since the Joplin, Missouri tornado that killed 158 people in 2011.

== Demographics ==
Historical population
Census	Pop.	Note	%±
1900	129		—
1910	225		74.4%
1920	254		12.9%
1930	538		111.8%
1940	499		−7.2%
1950	942		88.8%
1960	1,221		29.6%
1970	19,761		1,518.4%
1980	35,063		77.4%
1990	40,318		15.0%
2000	41,138		2.0%
2010	55,081		33.9%
2020	62,793		14.0%
U.S. Decennial Census

=== 2020 census ===
As of the 2020 census, Moore had a population of 62,793, the median age was 34.0 years, and 26.6% of residents were under the age of 18 and 11.9% of residents were 65 years of age or older. For every 100 females there were 95.6 males, and for every 100 females age 18 and over there were 92.6 males age 18 and over.

99.8% of residents lived in urban areas, while 0.2% lived in rural areas.

There were 23,545 households in Moore, of which 38.0% had children under the age of 18 living in them. Of all households, 48.8% were married-couple households, 17.6% were households with a male householder and no spouse or partner present, and 26.1% were households with a female householder and no spouse or partner present. About 23.4% of all households were made up of individuals and 8.2% had someone living alone who was 65 years of age or older.

There were 24,780 housing units, of which 5.0% were vacant. Among occupied housing units, 66.4% were owner-occupied and 33.6% were renter-occupied. The homeowner vacancy rate was 1.1% and the rental vacancy rate was 8.1%.

Racial composition as of the 2020 census
Race	Percent
White	68.1%
Black or African American	6.0%
American Indian and Alaska Native	4.3%
Asian	2.8%
Native Hawaiian and Other Pacific Islander	0.1%
Some other race	4.0%
Two or more races	14.7%
Hispanic or Latino (of any race)	12.1%

=== 2000 census ===
As of the census of 2000, there were 41,138 people, 14,848 households, and 11,566 families residing in the city. The population density was 1,892.8 inhabitants per square mile (730.8/km^{2}). There were 15,801 housing units at an average density of 727.0 per square mile (280.7/km^{2}). The racial makeup of the city was 84.63% White, 2.92% Black, 4.14% Native American, 1.62% Asian, 0.05% Pacific Islander, 1.75% from other races, and 4.89% from two or more races. Hispanic or Latino of any race were 5.10% of the population.

There were 14,848 households, out of which 41.8% had children under the age of 18 living with them, 60.4% were married couples living together, 13.3% had a female householder with no husband present, and 22.1% were non-families. 18.2% of all households were made up of individuals, and 5.1% had someone living alone who was 65 years of age or older. The average household size was 2.75 and the average family size was 3.13.

The city population age spread was 29.4% under 18, 9.3% from 18 to 24, .5% from 25 to 44, 21.5% from 45 to 64, and 7.2% who were 65 or older. The median age was 32 years. For every 100 females, there were 93.7 males. For every 100 females age 18 and over, there were 90.6 males.

The median income for a household in the city was $43,409, and the median income for a family was $47,773. Males had a median income of $33,394 versus $24,753 for females. The per capita income for the city was $17,689. About 6.3% of families and 7.6% of the population were below the poverty line, including 11.6% of those under age 18 and 4.4% of those age 65 or over.

== Education ==
=== Higher education ===
The only post-secondary school physically within Moore is the Randall University which has an enrollment of about 225. Moore's neighbor immediately to the south is Norman, Oklahoma, home of the University of Oklahoma. The Moore Norman Technology Center is a public career and technology education center. Its campuses however are outside of Moore in Norman and South Oklahoma City.

=== Primary and Secondary Schools ===
Moore Public Schools has three high schools: Moore, Southmoore, and Westmoore; six junior high schools: Brink, Central, Highland East, Highland West, Moore West, and Southridge; and 25 elementary schools: Apple Creek, Briarwood, Broadmoore, Bryant, Central, Earlywine, Eastlake, Fairview, Fisher, Heritage Trails, Houchin, Kelley, Kingsgate, Northmoor, Oakridge, Plaza Towers, Red Oak, Santa Fe, Sky Ranch, Sooner, South Lake, Southgate-Rippetoe, Timber Creek, Wayland Anders Bonds and Winding Creek.

On May 20, 2013, while classes were in progress, several of Moore's schools were damaged or destroyed by the 2013 Moore Tornado, most notably Plaza Towers Elementary, Briarwood Elementary and Highland East Junior High. However, these schools were rebuilt and reopened for the 2014–15 school year.

=== Libraries ===
Moore is served by the Moore Public Library, which is part of the Pioneer Library System.

== Media ==
Three media outlets focus on the Moore community. 19th Street Magazine publishes a free issue every month focusing on high school sports, community events and local businesses. Moore Monthly publishes a free monthly print publication while its website provides daily stories and videos about Moore, Norman and south Oklahoma City. The other media outlet is the Moore American.

== Moore Veterans Memorial ==
The City of Moore has funded the construction of a memorial to honor America's veterans and their families. The city renamed JD Estates Park to Veterans Memorial Park, and a memorial was constructed at the park entrance.

The main feature of the memorial is a 15-foot (4.6 m) black granite obelisk that has the inscription, "May this hallowed ground honor the sacrifice of America's finest veterans, civilians, and their families- past, present, and future. We will never forget." Another major feature of the memorial are five black granite tablets with the seal of the five branches of the American armed forces. At the center of the memorial is a flag plaza with a 30-foot (9.1 m) pole for the American flag and two 25-foot (7.6 m) poles for the Oklahoma flag and the POW/MIA flag. The flag plaza is surrounded by a polished concrete walking area with a stained five-pointed star stretching the entire width and height of the walking area.

A committee was formed to plan the second phase of the Moore Veterans Memorial. A campaign to sell bricks to be placed in the memorial was completed in early 2009. Over 190 bricks were purchased by supporters from the community and surrounding areas. The bricks were placed in the Memorial Wall and Phase II was completed in May 2009.

The Soldiers' Memorial was dedicated on May 15, 2010. It consists of four carved wooden soldiers representing the four major wars since the end of World War I. They include World War II, Korea, Vietnam, and the Afghanistan/Iraq War.

After being destroyed by the May 2013 tornado, the park won the title of "America's Favorite Park" in an online competition sponsored by Coca-Cola, beating out numerous other parks from around the country. First prize was a $100,000 grant, which was combined with other funds to cover the estimated $200,000 in rebuilding expenses. The first steps toward rebuilding began in November 2013, during a groundbreaking ceremony and the awarding of the grant to Mayor Glenn Lewis. The park's playgrounds are now open to the public.

== Notable people ==
- Kellie Coffey, country music artist
- Tom Cole, U.S. congressman
- Danny Cooksey, actor, voice artist, musician
- Mike Hinckley, former Major League Baseball pitcher for the Washington Nationals
- Jimmy Houston, professional fisherman and television host
- Jesse Jane, pornographic actress, graduated from high school in Moore
- Toby Keith, country music singer-songwriter, record producer, actor
- Cam Little, National Football League kicker for the Jacksonville Jaguars; holder of the record for the longest NFL field goal
- Randy Wayne, American Actor
