= Plaza Towers Elementary School =

Elementary school in Moore, Oklahoma, US

Location
- United States; 35.32558°N 97.50709°W

Information
- Type: Elementary school
- Established: 1966; 60 years ago
- School district: Moore Public Schools
- Principal: Cori Peak
- Faculty: 54
- Grades: K-6th
- Enrollment: 500
- Website: mooreschools.com

Plaza Towers Elementary School is a public elementary school in Moore, Oklahoma, in the Oklahoma City metropolitan area. It is a part of Moore Public Schools. Plaza Towers is located in southwest Moore within a neighborhood of the same name. The school's mascot is the panther, named "Paws". The school's current building opened in 2014 after the previous facility was destroyed by the 2013 Moore tornado; seven students at the school died as a result of the tornado's impact.

== History ==
The school first opened in 1966. After it opened, Plaza Towers became ranked among the highest two elementary schools in the district. As the school grew older, it became overcrowded and its demographics began to change with increasing numbers of disadvantaged students. The school received some additions as time passed. In 2006 a new building for second and third grade students was constructed. The 11,500-square-foot (1,070 m^{2}) structure had eight classrooms. This standalone building was built by a company headquartered in Norman, Barbour and Short Construction. In 2010 a newly-opened elementary school took many of the wealthiest children who previously attended Plaza Towers. Oakridge Elementary School took areas formerly zoned to Plaza Towers.

== 2013 tornado ==
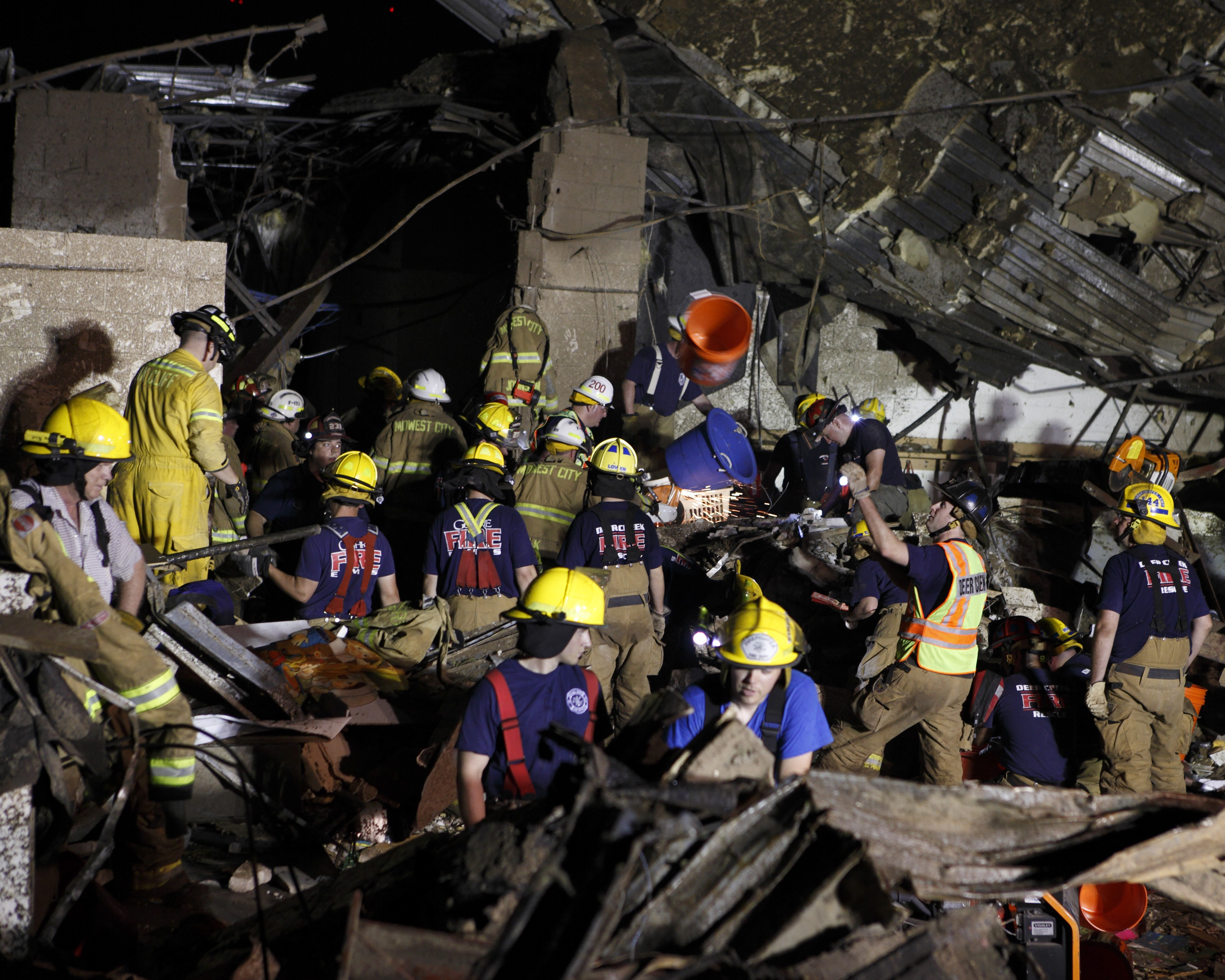
Over a dozen emergency workers comb through the rubble of Plaza Towers Elementary School.

The 2013 Moore tornado struck two public schools during school hours, the second of which was Plaza Towers Elementary. Another elementary school, Briarwood Elementary in Oklahoma City, located about 1 mile (1.6 km) southwest of Plaza Towers, was also hit, but no casualties were reported there. The storm destroyed the school building and killed seven third-grade students when the wall they had been seated against while bracing for the tornado collapsed onto them. News reports had initially incorrectly reported that the children had drowned in a pool, a statement later corrected to report that one of the students had died from blunt force trauma, while the other six suffocated due to the weight of the debris they were trapped underneath. Over 75 students were located at the school at the time. The school did not have a "safe room" in which students could take shelter from a natural disaster. In a broadcast with CNN, Piers Morgan held a live interview with Mikki Davis, whose 8-year-old son Kyle was among those killed at Plaza Towers. In the interview, Davis expressed vivid concern over why this school had not been built with proper safe spaces; the majority of schools in Oklahoma at the time also lacked safe spaces. Betsy Gunzelmann, author of Developing Safer Schools and Communities for Our Children: The Interdisciplinary Responsibility of Our Time, wrote that lives could have been saved if such a room was present. According to Oklahoma Department of Emergency Management Albert Ashwood, the cost of a safe room would have ranged from $600,000 to $1 million.

A civil engineer who serves as an associate professor and as the director of the Donald G. Fears Structural Engineering Lab at the University of Oklahoma, Chris Ramseyer, examined photographs of the third grade building and concluded that the construction of the third grade center was flawed as the rebar in the reinforced concrete walls was not long enough. It was not possible to study the debris itself since it had been cleared before engineers had a chance to examine it.

On August 19, 2014, the rebuilt school opened with a safe area.

== Campus ==
The current building has a portion considered to be a "safe area" under Federal Emergency Management Agency (FEMA) standards. This includes a hallway which, in order to limit injuries due to flying debris during a tornado, has no windows, as well as four classrooms with attached bathroom facilities. During normal operations, early childhood and pre-Kindergarten students are housed in this section. The building, with a capacity for 600-640 pupils, had a total cost of $12 million, paid from insurance coverage, and was built with a similar size as the previous building. When it opened, the school received new computers also paid for by insurance money.

In the building, designed in a similar manner to that of South Lake Elementary School, has multiple wings with different grade levels; two classrooms each are dedicated per grade. The media center is across from the office, which was designed as the entry point for visitors. The wing for third through fifth graders includes the school's art room, computer lab, and music room. Included in the new school building is a section of the wall of the old school, decorated with the panther mascot, that survived the tornado.

The school has the Plaza Towers 7 Memorial, a memorial to the seven students who died in the 2013 tornado. It was completed in November 2014, and includes a large tree adjacent to a set of seven benches; each bench has the name of the child and features specific to each child's personality and interests. It is decorated with gray and mahogany granite slabs. The plaques were decorated with silhouettes of the students. The Moore Rotary Club coordinated the fundraising to establish the memorial, which raised $226,000 for the memorial itself and $20,000 for maintenance. Fundraising concluded in 2015.

== Feeder patterns ==
Most persons zoned to Plaza Towers are zoned to Highland West Junior High School, while a few are zoned to Southridge Junior High School. Students zoned to this school are zoned to Southmoore High School.
