= Vaughan Foods beheading incident =

2014 attack in Moore, Oklahoma, US

- Location: Moore, Oklahoma, U.S.
- Date: September 25, 2014
- Attack type: Terrorist attack; Decapitation; Stabbing
- Weapon: Knife
- Deaths: 1 (Colleen Hufford)
- Injuries: 2 (Traci Johnson and the attacker)
- Perpetrators: Alton Alexander Nolen, aka "Jah'Keem Yisrael"

On September 25, 2014, Alton Nolen attacked two employees at the Vaughan Foods food processing plant in Moore, Oklahoma, United States, with a knife. He beheaded Colleen Hufford, and also stabbed another employee, Traci Johnson, who was critically injured. Nolen, whom the plant had fired prior to the attack, was shot and wounded by Vaughan Foods chief operating officer Mark Vaughan. The attack came to national attention due to its gruesome nature, which followed a well-publicized recent series of beheadings carried out by the Islamic State of Iraq and Syria (ISIS).

Nolen pleaded not guilty by reason of insanity due to a history of schizophrenia. Following a trial in October 2017, he was convicted of first-degree murder and multiple counts of assault and battery. A jury recommended that Nolen be sentenced to death, and, on December 15, 2017, a judge sentenced Nolen to death by lethal injection.

== Attack ==
On September 25, 2014, a Vaughan Foods employee identified as Alton Nolen was suspended from his job in suburban Oklahoma City after Traci Johnson initiated a complaint against him following an argument "about [Nolen] not liking white people," according to Cleveland County Prosecutor Greg Mashburn. Immediately afterwards, he went home to retrieve a knife and placed it inside his shoe. He then drove to the plant's main distribution center, crashed into a parked car, and entered the front administrative office area. There, according to detectives, he attacked Colleen Hufford from behind with the knife, first slashing her throat and then beheading her. Other coworkers tried to stop him during the assault by kicking him and throwing chairs at him. He slashed the throat and face of another female employee, Traci Johnson, intending to behead her. The attack ended when he was shot and wounded by Vaughan Foods Chief Operating Officer Mark Vaughan, an Oklahoma County reserve deputy, and arrested by responding police.

=== Victims ===
The slain victim in the attack was identified as 54-year-old Colleen Hufford (January 5, 1960 - September 25, 2014). Her cause of death was verified to be "decapitation due to multiple sharp force trauma to the neck" and classified as a homicide. 43-year-old Traci Johnson, the injured victim, was treated at the University of Oklahoma Medical Center for multiple stab wounds and survived her injuries.

== Perpetrator ==
Alton Alexander Nolen

Alton Alexander Nolen (born August 16, 1984), at age 30, committed the attack. He worked as a production line employee at Vaughan Foods before being suspended. He was charged with assault and battery on a police officer after being pulled over in 2010 for having a suspended license plate. He fled, sparking a massive manhunt that lasted for twelve hours. Nolen was sentenced to five years in prison but was released in March 2013 after serving two years and ordered to attend an anger management course. He was also convicted of cocaine possession with the intent to distribute during the following year.

Nolen had been suspended from his job before the attack. Injured victim Traci Johnson later said that Nolen had been suspended after an altercation when he stated he "did not like white people". The weapon he used in the attack was a 10-inch work knife used by employees to cut lettuce and other vegetables, allegedly acquired from his home. County District Attorney Greg Mashburn noted that Nolen reportedly had three specific targets for the attack, including Johnson. The other two reported targets were not hurt during the incident. Nolen was shot and wounded during the attack by the company's Chief Operating Officer, a reserve deputy who happened to be armed.

=== Islamic connection ===
Nolen completed his prison sentence for drug offenses and assault in March 2013; shortly afterward, he converted to Islam.

The motive for the attack was initially unclear, as it was unknown if the suspect's beliefs played a role in the attack. In their search warrant requests, police reported that witnesses had stated "Nolen had several previous disagreements and arguments with employees," while describing him as becoming increasingly violent, disrespectful, and aggressive towards his co-workers. "Witnesses also had overheard Nolen saying that he did not like and beat Caucasians"; that he "was attempting to convince other employees to convert to the religion"; and that he had become aggressive and belligerent to other employees while wanting others to call him 'Muhammad.'

However, prosecutors noted that Nolen had demonstrated an "infatuation" with beheadings. Because of the brutal manner of death and the fact that the attack followed a series of high-profile videotaped beheadings carried out by Islamic State (ISIS) militants in the Middle East, Moore police asked the FBI to assist in the investigation. The FBI was also investigating the attack because Nolen "was saying Arabic terms in the attack," according to County Prosecutor Greg Mashburn. Although Nolen attended a Baptist church as a youth, Oklahoma prison system records listed his religion as Islam. FBI officials confirmed that their investigation included whether Nolen's recent conversion to Islam was somehow linked to the crime. Moore Police Sgt. Jeremy Lewis confirmed his department's request for FBI help investigating Nolen's background. Oklahoma prison records also show that Nolen, who has a previous criminal record, has a tattoo reading "Assalamu Alaikum," an Arabic greeting that translates to "Peace be with you."

Using his Islamic name, "Jah'Keem Yisrael" his Facebook page featured photos of the Taliban, Osama bin Laden, as well as an image of a partially decapitated man with someone standing over him, pulling his head back to show the wound. A photo of the September 11 attacks was shown with the caption:

A Future Prophecy Revelation 18:8 She (The statue Of Liberty) is going into flames. She and anybody who's with her. [sic]

Saad Mohammed, director of information for the Islamic Society of Greater Oklahoma City, confirmed that Alton Nolen began worshipping at the Islamic Society of Greater Oklahoma City (ISGOC) mosque in May and that he had seen him there several times since. A picture on Nolan's Facebook page shows him attending the mosque on September 5, 2014, nineteen days before the attack. Those who attended the same mosque as Nolen described his behavior as "a little odd" and "weird"; nonetheless, his prior behavior did not raise any red flags. Mohammed stated after the attack that Nolen's actions did not reflect the beliefs of Islam.

== Trial, conviction, and death sentence ==
On September 30, Nolen was charged with first-degree murder and assault and battery with a deadly weapon. According to police, he "openly admitted" to killing Hufford and injuring Johnson during the attack.

On October 28, 2015, following a competency hearing, District Judge Lori Walkley ruled that Alton Nolen was competent to stand trial. The judge rejected defense attorneys' argument Nolen met the legal definition of mental retardation. He was formally accused of beheading co-worker Colleen Hufford and nearly beheading Traci Johnson, a second co-worker, who survived her injuries. He also faced four assault and battery charges for threatening or assaulting co-workers with a knife. Prosecutors sought the death penalty.

On August 17, 2016, an Oklahoma judge ruled that Nolen was not competent to enter a guilty plea in his murder case. The state mental hospital in Vinita handled Nolen's treatment and evaluation. The case was temporarily put on hold until Nolen returned from Vinita for a post-evaluation hearing.

Nolen's trial began in September 2017. Represented by court-appointed counsel, he pleaded not guilty by reason of insanity. Prosecutors offered the testimony of five law enforcement officers who responded to the scene of the crime, as well as photographs showing the gruesome scene, the knife used in the attack, and items found in Nolen's apartment and car. The medical examiner who conducted the autopsy also testified. A paramedic who responded to the scene testified that, in a conversation in the back of the ambulance after the attack, Nolen was calm, attentive, and answered questions, supporting their theory that Nolan was able to distinguish between right and wrong. The state also introduced Nolen's two recorded confessions from September 2014, in which Nolen (then recovering from injuries in a hospital) told the Moore police and the FBI that he conducted the attack because he felt oppressed and because he believed he was following Islamic teachings: "I just feel like ... I did what I needed to do. What Allah ... says in the Qur'an to do. Oppressors don't need to be here." In the recording, Nolen called Johnson "a slave for the devil" and indicated that his action was at least in part racially motivated: "I beat on Caucasians." The district attorney expressed his view that Nolen was motivated more by racial resentment, and by a desire to "get revenge" against former co-workers, than by his religious beliefs and recent conversion to Islam.

Nolen's defense attorneys did not dispute that he committed the killings, but contended that he was insane at the time of the crime, offering the testimony of two psychologists who had assessed Nolen. One psychologist diagnosed Nolen with schizophrenia spectrum disorder. A second psychologist, who interviewed Nolen in 2015, said that during her interview, Nolen was controlled and "quite delusional" but still cooperative, telling her that he wanted to be executed and that he had no regrets about his crime. She also found Nolen to be intellectually impaired, with an IQ of 69; could only express himself at the level of a "child younger than 7"; and refused to cooperate with his lawyers. She concluded that Nolen was insane at the time of the crime. The psychologist said that Nolen had called her an "infidel" and that there was a history of mental illness in his family. Closing arguments were focused on whether Nolen knew right from wrong at the time of the crime—the criteria for the insanity defense.

On September 30, 2017, after two hours of deliberation, the jury convicted Nolen of one count of first-degree murder and five counts of assault, rejecting his insanity offenses. On October 2, 2017, the jury sentenced him to life in prison for the assaults. The jury also recommended on October 12, 2017, that Nolen be sentenced to death for murder.

On December 15, 2017, Cleveland County District Judge Lori Walkley followed the jury's recommendation, and sentenced Nolen to death by lethal injection.

In March 2021, the Oklahoma Court of Criminal Appeals affirmed the ruling. In January 2022, the same court denied Nolen's request for post-conviction relief.

== See also ==
- Murder of Lee Rigby (2013)
- 2014 ISIL beheading incidents
