= Billy Bajema =

American football player (born 1982)

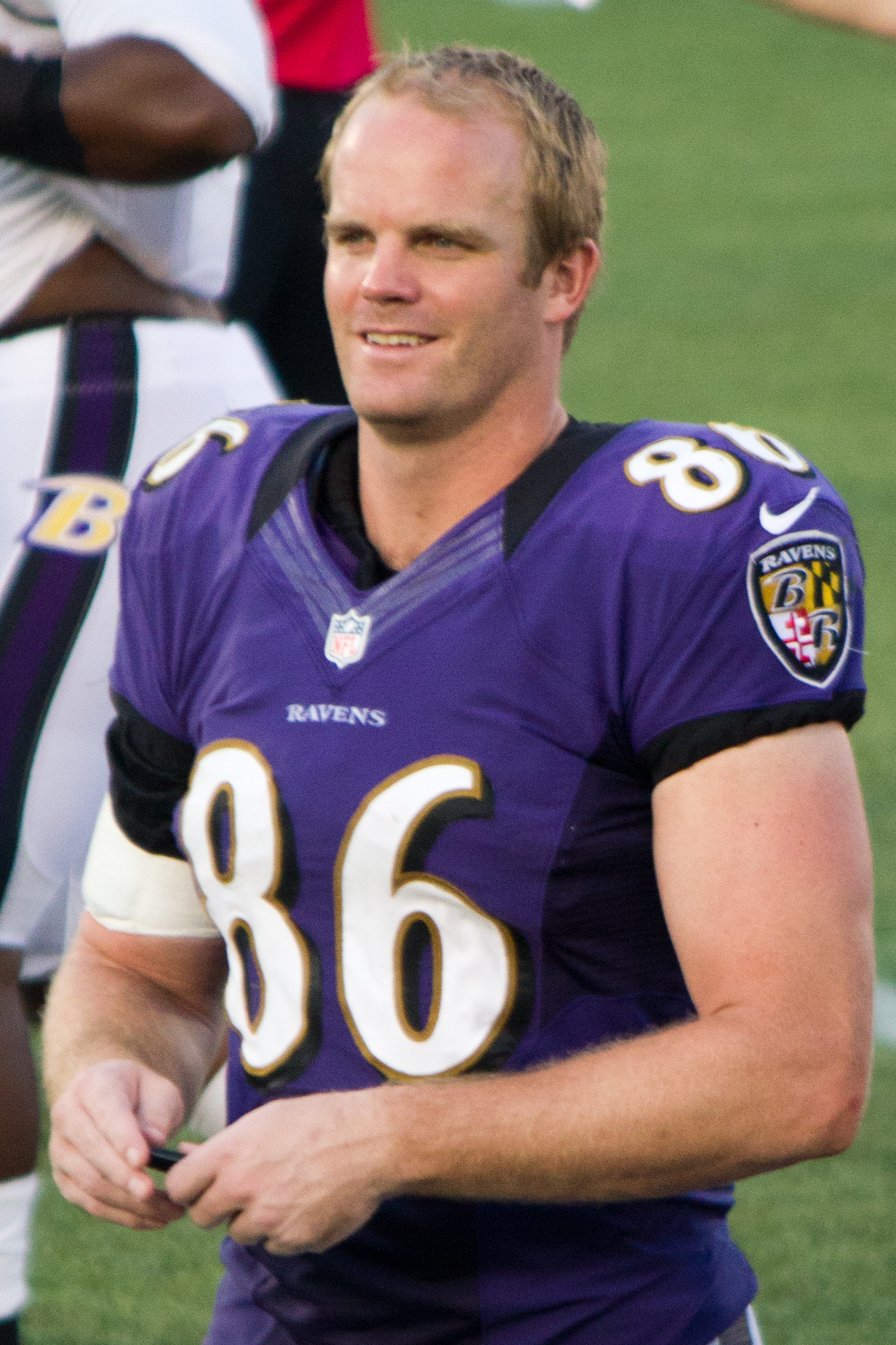
- Bajema after Ravens practice at Navy–Marine Corps Memorial Stadium in 2012

No. 47, 86
- Position: Tight end

Personal information
- Born: October 31, 1982 (age 44); Oklahoma City, Oklahoma, U.S.
- Listed height: 6 ft 4 in (1.93 m)
- Listed weight: 259 lb (117 kg)

Career information
- High school: Westmoore (Oklahoma City)
- College: Oklahoma State
- NFL draft: 2005: 7th round, 249th overall pick

Career history
- San Francisco 49ers (2005–2008); St. Louis Rams (2009–2011); Baltimore Ravens (2012–2013)

Awards and highlights
- Super Bowl champion (XLVII); First-team All-Big 12 (2004); Second-team All-Big 12 (2003)

Career NFL statistics
- Receptions: 40
- Receiving yards: 416
- Receiving touchdowns: 2
- Stats at Pro Football Reference

William Daryl Bajema II (born October 31, 1982) is an American former professional football player who was a tight end in the National Football League (NFL). He played college football for the Oklahoma State Cowboys and was selected by the San Francisco 49ers in the seventh round of the 2005 NFL draft.

== Early life ==
Bajema attended Brink Junior High and Westmoore High School in Oklahoma City, Oklahoma, and was a three-sport letterwinner in: football, baseball, and basketball. In football, as a senior, he passed for 845 yards, 7 touchdowns, and 9 interceptions as the team's quarterback, and also saw playing time at defensive end. As a senior, he was named by both the Daily Oklahoman and the Tulsa World as an all state honorable mention, and also played in the Oil Bowl. While attending Westmoore High School, Bajema was also a stand out baseball player, receiving interest by major league scouts. He was also in National Honor Society and kept a high grade point.

== College career ==
After arriving at Oklahoma State University, Bajema switched to tight end where he played extensively throughout all 4 seasons. He played in 46 games making 37 starts and recorded 52 receptions for 709 yards and four touchdowns. He was a four-time Academic All-Big 12 honoree and as a senior, he won ESPN Academic All-American honors. Bajema was a double major in pre-med and business and graduated with a 3.7 GPA.

== Professional career ==
Pre-draft measurables
Height	Weight	40-yard dash	10-yard split	20-yard split	20-yard shuttle	Three-cone drill	Vertical jump	Broad jump	Bench press
6 ft 4 7/8 in (1.95 m)	261 lb (118 kg)	4.80 s	1.66 s	2.79 s	4.25 s	7.05 s	31 1/2 in (0.80 m)	9 ft 5 in (2.87 m)	16 reps
All values from NFL Combine.

=== San Francisco 49ers ===
Bajema was selected by San Francisco 49ers in seventh round (249th pick overall) of the 2005 NFL draft. On June 8, 2005, he signed a 3-year $1.043 million contract with the 49ers. Bajema made it to the final roster after the preseason and by the end of the 2007 NFL season, he had played in 45 games with 15 starts.

Bajema signed his one-year, $927,000 tender as a restricted free agent to stay with the 49ers in 2008. Bajema was mostly used as the blocking tight end by 49ers.

=== St. Louis Rams ===
An unrestricted free agent after the 2008 season, Bajema signed a three-year $2.5 million contract with the St. Louis Rams on March 30, 2009. The contract included a $270,000 signing bonus and salaries of $620,000 in 2009, $626,000 in 2010 and $985,000 in 2011.

=== Baltimore Ravens ===
Bajema signed with the Baltimore Ravens on August 1, 2012. He helped the Ravens win Super Bowl XLVII over his old team, the 49ers to earn his first championship ring. After leaving the Ravens following the 2012 season, Bajema was re-signed by the team one day before its 2013 season opener, filling the roster spot opened by starting tight end Dennis Pitta's injury. On the Ravens' first score of the season, Bajema went in motion prior to the snap, putting the entire opposing Denver Broncos defense off-guard and nearly single-handedly contributing to Vonta Leach's touchdown reception.

== Personal life ==
Bajema was born in Oklahoma City, Oklahoma. He resides in Oklahoma City.

In 2004, the Fellowship of Christian Athletes presented Billy Bajema with the first of what is now a yearly award in Bobby Bowden's name, The National Bobby Bowden Award, which honors one college football player for their achievements on the field and in the classroom and for their conduct as a faith model in the community. Nominees must have a 3.0 GPA or better and must also have the backing of his school's athletic director and head football coach. The award allows for a scholarship to be put forth for graduate studies. In 2014, Bajema began coaching football at John Marshall High School in Oklahoma City, where former Oklahoma State teammate Rashaun Woods was named head coach in 2012.

Bajema is a member of Oklahoma City Trinity Church of the Nazarene. He co-wrote a book with Nazarene General Superintendent Stan Toler.
