= Westmoore High School =

Location
- 12613 South Western Avenue; Oklahoma City, Oklahoma 73170; United States; 35.343135°N 97.534304°W

Information
- Type: Public
- Established: 1988
- School district: Moore Public School District
- CEEB code: 372-697
- Principal: Cindi Decker
- Staff: 125.99 (on an FTE basis)
- Grades: 9–12
- Enrollment: 2,607 (2024-25)
- Student to teacher ratio: 20.60
- Campus: Suburban
- Colors: Red, black, & silver
- Athletics conference: OSSAA Class 6A
- Mascot: Jaguar
- Rivals: Southmoore High School; Moore High School (Oklahoma)
- Website: Westmoore High

Westmoore High School is an American four-year public high school located in south Oklahoma City, Oklahoma. The school was founded in 1988 and serves ninth through twelfth grades as part of the Moore Public School District. Westmoore was the second high school in the district after Moore High School. Southmoore High School, which opened in the 2008–2009 academic year, is the third.

On May 3, 1999, tornadoes severely damaged the campus, its auditorium, and a nearby elementary school. The remainder of the school year for the approximately 2,000 students was finished at Oklahoma City Community College.

Academically, Westmoore offers a program in which 11th or 12th grade students may take morning or afternoon courses at Moore Norman Technology Center. Seventeen Advanced Placement courses are offered by Westmoore in topics including AP Music Theory, AP Studio Art, and AP Psychology.

== Notable alumni ==
- Billy Bajema, professional football player
- Kellie Coffey, singer
- Camille Herron, professional ultramarathon runner and world record holder
- Krystal Keith, country music singer
- Derek Loccident, paralympic athlete
- Brian Newberry, American football coach
- Kyle Tyler, professional baseball player
- Jamey Wright, professional baseball player

== AP courses offered ==
- AP Biology
- AP Calculus, AB and BC
- AP Chemistry
- AP Computer Science Principles
- AP Computer Science A
- AP Language and Composition
- AP Literature and Composition
- AP Environmental Science
- AP European History
- AP United States Government
- AP United States History
- AP Physics, 1 and C
- AP French IV
- AP Spanish IV
- AP Music Theory
- AP Psychology
- AP Statistics
- AP Studio Art IV
- AP Human Geography
- AP World History
