= National Weather Service Tulsa, Oklahoma =

National Weather Service Weather Forecast Office Tulsa, Oklahoma

Agency overview
- Type: Meteorological
- Headquarters: 10159 E. 11th St. Suite 300, Tulsa, OK; 36.149°N 95.862°W
- Employees: 27
- Agency executives: Steve Piltz, Meteorologist in Charge; Ed Calianese, Warning Coordination Meteorologist; Steven Cobb, Science Operations Officer
- Parent agency: National Weather Service
- Website: www.srh.noaa.gov/tsa

National Weather Service - Tulsa, Oklahoma (TSA) is a local weather forecast office responsible for monitoring weather conditions for 7 counties in Northwestern Arkansas, and 25 counties in Eastern Oklahoma. The current office in Tulsa maintains a WSR-88D (NEXRAD) radar system, and Advanced Weather Interactive Processing System (AWIPS) that greatly improve forecasting in the region. Tulsa is in charge of weather forecasts, warnings and local statements as well as aviation weather and NOAA Weather Radio broadcasts in its service area. The office operates two Doppler weather radars, one in Tulsa (INX), and the other in Fort Smith, Arkansas (SRX). Steve Piltz is the Meteorologist-In-Charge (MIC) of this office.
