= Moore Public Schools =

School district in Oklahoma

Moore Public School District
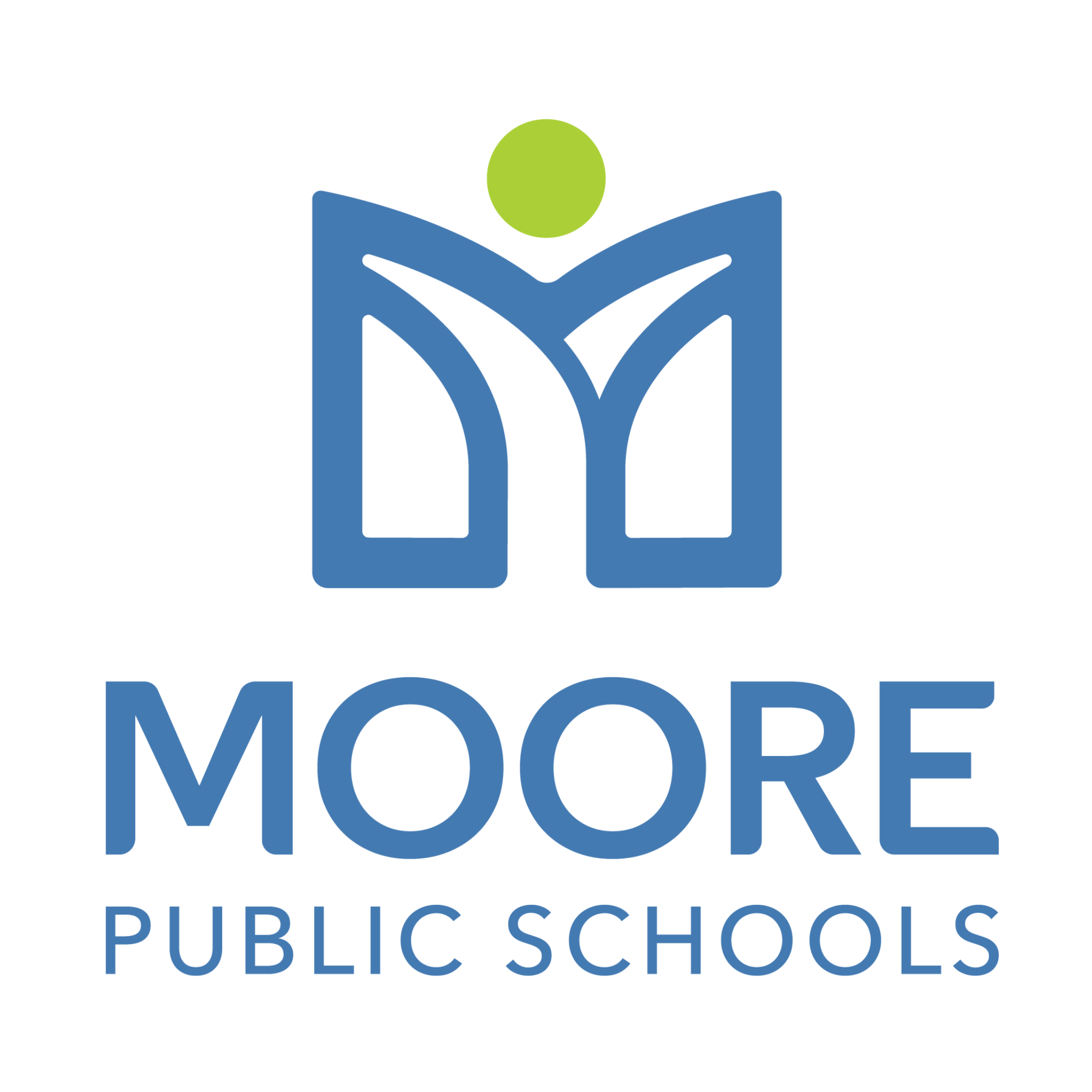

Address
- 1500 SE 4th Street Moore, Oklahoma, 73160; United States
- Coordinates: 35°20′00″N 97°27′58″W

District information
- Type: Public
- Motto: Shaping Today’s Students Into Tomorrow’s Leaders
- Grades: Pre-K to 12th
- NCES District ID: 4020250

Students and staff
- Enrollment: 23,500+ (2024-2025)
- Staff: 3,300+
- Student–teacher ratio: 16.66

Other information
- Website: www.mooreschools.com

The Moore Public School District, also known as Moore Public Schools, is a public school district headquartered in Moore, Oklahoma. The school district is the third largest in the state of Oklahoma, after Oklahoma City Public Schools and Tulsa Public Schools, with an enrollment of 23,500 as of the 2024-2025 school year.

== Service area ==
Within Cleveland County, the district includes all or part of three cities: the entire city of Moore, a very large portion of southern Oklahoma City, and northern Norman. The district extends into Oklahoma County, where it covers other parts of Oklahoma City.

The district covers approximately 160 square miles (410 km^{2}) and has pre kindergarten through 12 grade students enrolled.

== History ==
=== 2013 tornado ===
On May 20, 2013, parts of Moore and neighboring Newcastle and southern Oklahoma City, were affected by an intense multiple-vortex EF5 tornado. The tornado struck Briarwood Elementary School (South Oklahoma City), Plaza Towers Elementary School (Moore), and Highland East Junior High School. Briarwood and Plaza Towers sustained enough damage to be considered a total loss. Highland East's gym was for the most part destroyed. All out buildings were destroyed completely. Seven third graders inside Plaza Towers' 2nd-3rd grade annex lost their lives when the structure's walls collapsed.

=== Ebola reaction ===
On October 20, 2014, the district asked several employees and students who had been on a Carnival Cruise ship which had also been carrying a lab technician who may have come in contact with specimens from Ebola patient Thomas Eric Duncan three weeks earlier, not to return to school until the worker was cleared and there was no medical threat. The Lab technician tested negative and the employees and students were allowed to return to school.

=== 2015 tornado ===
On March 25, 2015, an EF2 tornado hit southern Oklahoma City and Moore and lifted the roof and damaged Southgate Elementary and other houses in the path of the tornado. Some were injured. No one was found dead.

== List of schools ==
The school district has 35 schools including VISTA Alternative Education, with preschool through 6th grade students attending elementary school, 7th and 8th grade students attending junior high school and 9th through 12th grade students attending high school.

=== High schools ===
- Moore High School (Established in 1920)
- Westmoore High School (Established in 1988) (Auditorium damaged by the 3 May 1999 tornado outbreak; school was later expanded, with the extension doubling as a saferoom the following summer, and again in 2009)
- Southmoore High School (Established in 2008)

=== Junior high schools ===
- Brink Junior High (Established in 1979)
- Central Junior High (Established In 1935)
- Highland East Junior High (Established In 1974) (partially damaged by tornado on May 20, 2013)
- Highland West Junior High (Established In 1971)
- Moore West Junior High (Established in 1975)
- Southridge Junior High (Established in 2015)

=== Elementary schools ===
- Apple Creek Elementary (Established In 1980)
- Briarwood Elementary (Established In 1985) (rebuilt after being destroyed by tornado on May 20, 2013) - In southern Oklahoma City
- Broadmoore Elementary (Established In 1993)
- Bryant Elementary (Established In 1995)
- Central Elementary (Established In 1947)
- Earlywine Elementary (Established In 1993)
- Eastlake Elementary (Established In 1995)
- Fairview Elementary (Established In 1963)
- Fisher Elementary (Established In 1990)
- Heritage Trails Elementary (Established in 2010)
- Houchin Elementary (Established In 1972)
- Kelley Elementary (Established In 1965) (rebuilt after being destroyed by tornado on May 3, 1999)
- Kingsgate Elementary (Established In 1973)
- Northmoor Elementary (Established In 1964)
- Oakridge Elementary (Established in 2010)
- Plaza Towers Elementary (Established In 1966) (rebuilt after being destroyed by tornado on May 20, 2013)
- Red Oak Elementary (Established In 1980)
- Santa Fe Elementary (Established In 1979)
- Sky Ranch Elementary (Established In 1968)
- Sooner Elementary (Established In 1991)
- South Lake Elementary (Established In 2014)
- Southgate/Rippetoe Elementary (Established In 1962) (partially damaged by tornado on March 25, 2015)
- Timber Creek Elementary (Established in 2015)
- Wayland Bonds Elementary (Established in 2005)
- Winding Creek Elementary (Established in 1978)

==== Briarwood Elementary School ====
The previous facility was built in 1984 by an Oklahoma City company, RGDC. It had a central building as well as separate buildings for classrooms, storage, and multipurpose functions. RGDC later experienced scandal in 1996 after issues in the construction of the Oklahoma County Jail were exposed. A team from the American Society of Civil Engineers and the Structural Engineering Institute (ASCE-SEI) examined the debris after the 2013 tornado. A civil engineer who serves as an associate professor and as the director of the Donald G. Fears Structural Engineering Lab at the University of Oklahoma, Chris Ramseyer, was one of the authors of the ASCE-SEI report. Ramseyer stated that the school had code violations and issues with its construction. Issues cited included rebar that was too short and insufficient steel in masonry walls. The current building, with a cost of $12 million, opened in 2014. It has designated safe rooms so children can avoid injury during a tornado. Funded by insurance coverage, it was built with a similar size as the previous building.

=== Preschool ===
- Earlywine Little Learners Preschool

=== Alternative education ===
- VISTA Academy
