= List of Oklahoma state high school football champions =

Oklahoma state high school football championships

This is a list of the Oklahoma state high school football champions which have been sanctioned by the Oklahoma Secondary School Activities Association (OSSAA).

== List of Oklahoma state high school football champions ==
Year	Class 6A-I	Class 6A-II	Class 5A	Class 4A	Class 3A	Class 2A-I	Class 2A-II	Class A-I	Class A-II	Class B-I	Class B-II	Class C	
2025	Bixby	Sand Springs	Carl Albert	Tuttle	Lincoln Christian	Jones	Adair	Rejoice Christian	Talihina	Dewar	Seiling	Ryan	
2024	Bixby	Choctaw	Carl Albert	Elgin	Lincoln Christian	Washington	Davis	Rejoice Christian	Woodland	Dewar	Weleetka	Tipton	
Year	Class 6A-I	Class 6A-II	Class 5A	Class 4A	Class 3A	Class 2A		Class A		Class B		Class C	
2023	Bixby	Muskogee	Carl Albert	Blanchard	Lincoln Christian	Washington		Fairview		Seiling		Tipton	
2022	Bixby	Stillwater	Carl Albert	Wagoner	Heritage Hall	Washington		Fairview		Laverne		Tipton	
2021	Jenks	Bixby	Collinsville	Clinton	Holland Hall	Marlow		Cashion		Laverne		Timberlake	
2020	Jenks	Bixby	Carl Albert	Wagoner	Holland Hall	Metro Christian		Cashion		Dewar		Tyrone	
2019	Owasso	Bixby	Carl Albert	Poteau	Lincoln Christian	Metro Christian		Ringling		Shattuck		Pond Creek-Hunter	
2018	Broken Arrow	Bixby	Carl Albert	Tuttle	Heritage Hall	Sperry		Tonkawa		Shattuck		Tipton	
2017	Owasso	Booker T. Washington	Carl Albert	Heritage Hall	John Marshall	Millwood		Afton		Shattuck		Tipton	
2016	Union	Bixby	Carl Albert	Wagoner	Jones	Millwood		Hominy		Laverne		Tipton	
2015	Jenks	Bixby	Altus	Wagoner	Heritage Hall	Adair		Stratford		Davenport		Shattuck	
2014	Jenks	Bixby	MacArthur	Wagoner	Heritage Hall	Davis		Thomas		Alex		Tipton	
Year	Class 6A		Class 5A	Class 4A	Class 3A	Class 2A		Class A		Class B		Class C	
2013	Jenks		Guthrie	Anadarko	Kingfisher	Davis		Hollis		Laverne		Cherokee	
2012	Jenks		Carl Albert	Clinton	Blanchard	Oklahoma Christian		Ringling		Laverne		Tipton	
2011	Union		Guthrie	Wagoner	Anadarko	Hennessey		Wayne		Caddo		Shattuck	
2010	Union		Booker T. Washington	Douglass	Heritage Hall	Hennessey		Woodland		Cherokee		Deer Creek-Lamont	
2009	Union		Carl Albert	Star Spencer	Cascia Hall	Lincoln Christian		Tonkawa		Garber		Timberlake	
2008	Union		Booker T. Washington	Glenpool	Cascia Hall	Heritage Hall		Morrison		Garber		Shattuck	
2007	Jenks		Guthrie	Bishop McGuinness	Clinton	Cascia Hall		Okeene		Morrison		Shattuck	
2006	Jenks		Carl Albert	Bishop McGuinness	Sequoyah Claremore	Millwood		Okeene		Morrison		Shattuck	
2005	Union		East Central	Clinton	Tuttle	Chandler		Tonkawa		Morrison		Shattuck	
2004	Union		Carl Albert	Clinton	Berryhill	Sulphur		Pawnee		Weleetka		Shattuck	
2003	Jenks		Shawnee	Clinton	Kingfisher	Bethany		Ringling		Morrison		Shattuck	
2002	Union		Guthrie	Glenpool	Sulphur	Millwood		Thomas		Weleetka		Pond Creek-Hunter	
2001	Jenks		Carl Albert	Clinton	Tuttle	Millwood		Hominy		Pioneer-Pleasant Vale		Pond Creek-Hunter	
2000	Jenks		Carl Albert	Clinton	Deer Creek	Millwood		Tonkawa		Pioneer-Pleasant Vale		Kremlin-Hillsdale	
1999	Jenks		Carl Albert	Weatherford	Cascia Hall	Fairview		Tonkawa		Pioneer-Pleasant Vale		Medford	
1998	Jenks		Carl Albert	Elk City	Oologah	Heritage Hall		Rush Springs		Garber		Balko	
1997	Jenks		Carl Albert	Clinton	Oologah	Hobart		Turpin		Pioneer-Pleasant Vale		Tipton	
1996	Jenks		Ada	Clinton	Seminole	Frederick		Washington		Pioneer-Pleasant Vale		Waynoka	
1995	Midwest City		John Marshall	Ada	Frederick	Davis		Turpin		Snyder		Central Marlow	
1994	Midwest City		Woodward	Ada	Frederick	Watonga		Velma-Alma		Morrison		Central Marlow	
1993	Jenks		Carl Albert	Ada	Frederick	Watonga		Velma-Alma		Morrison		Central Marlow	
1992	Norman		Ardmore	Weatherford	Newcastle	Wynnewood		Ringling		Morrison		Grandfield	
Year	Class 5A			Class 4A	Class 3A	Class 2A		Class A		Class B		Class C	
1991	Putnam City North			Ada	Weatherford	Wynnewood		Shattuck		Morrison		Grandfield	
1990	Eisenhower			Ardmore	Millwood	Davis		Crescent		Morrison		Balko	
1989	Edmond			Carl Albert	Broken Bow	Cascia Hall		Ringling		Morrison		Temple	
1988	Midwest City			McAlester	Ada	Wynnewood		Seiling		Morrison		Helena-Goltry	
1987	Lawton			McLain	Guymon	Wynnewood		Marietta		Welch		Kremlin-Hillsdale	
1986	Muskogee			McLain	Ada	Davis		Fairfax		Morrison		Lone Wolf	
Year	Class 5A			Class 4A	Class 3A	Class 2A		Class A		Class B			
1985	Midwest City			Broken Bow	Bristow	Morris		Fox		Pond Creek-Hunter			
1984	Booker T. Washington			Duncan	Clinton	Chandler		Picher-Cardin		Morrison			
1983	Enid			Duncan	Durant	Morris		Hominy		Pernell			
1982	Jenks			Ardmore	Clinton	Hobart		Hominy		Pernell			
Year	Class 4A				Class 3A	Class 2A		Class A		Class B		Class C	
1981	Putnam City West				Bishop Kelley	Sallisaw		Stroud		Okeene		Cashion	
1980	Memorial				Ada	Sallisaw		Hobart		Kingston		Turpin	
1979	Nathan Hale				Jenks	Durant		Blanchard		Davis		Cashion	
1978	McLain				Duncan	Clinton		Watonga		Fox		Turpin	
1977	Putnam City				Duncan	Seminole		Watonga		Fairfax		Cashion	
1976	Del City				Douglass	Bristow		Okemah		Fairfax		Waynoka	
1975	Putnam City				Okmulgee	Bristow		Beggs		Fairfax		Turpin	
1974	Putnam City				Ada; Owasso (Note: The 1974 OSSAA Class 3A state championship game ended in a 7–7 tie, which resulted in Ada and Owasso being declared co-champions.)	Skiatook		Stroud		Davenport		Forgan	
1973	Booker T. Washington				Shawnee	Broken Bow		Hominy		Davenport		Turpin	
1972	Nathan Hale				Southeast	Broken Bow		Purcell		Davenport		Turpin	
1971	Booker T. Washington				Altus	Watonga		Vian		Texhoma		Braman	
1970	Lawton				Ada	Nowata		Stroud		Minco		Helena	
Year	Class 3A					Class 2A		Class A		Class B		Class C	8-Man
1969	Booker T. Washington					Okmulgee		Clinton		Stroud		Thomas	Helena
1968	Booker T. Washington					McAlester		Clinton		Hobart		Minco	Jet-Nash
1967	Booker T. Washington					Stillwater		Clinton		Hobart		Marietta	Balko
1966	Enid					Sand Springs		Wewoka		Talihina		Rush Springs	Balko
1965	Enid					Ada		Clinton		Wynnewood		Seiling	Balko
1964	Enid					Ada		Holdenville		Marlow		Marietta	Marshall
Year	Class 2A							Class A		Class B		Class C	8-Man
1963	Lawton							John Marshall		Lindsay		Union	Turpin
1962	Lawton							Ada		Lindsay		Beaver	Jet-Nash
1961	Norman							Cushing		Lawton Douglass		Thomas	Freedom
1960	Midwest City							Seminole		Choctaw		Beaver	Tyrone
1959	Northwest Classen							Ada		Marlow		Beaver	Carmen
Year	Class 2A							Class A		Class B		Class C	
1958	Capitol Hill							Cushing		Lindsay		Grandfield	
1957	Capitol Hill							Ada		Ardmore		Thomas	
1956	Douglass							Ada		Frederick		Thomas	
Year	Class A									Class B		Class C	
1955	Ada									Lindsay		Thomas	
1954	No championship												
Year	Class 2A							Class A		Class B		Class C	
1953	Ardmore							Seminole		Tonkawa		Maysville	
Year	Class A									Class B		Class C	
1952	Ada									Tonkawa		Tipton	
1951	Ada									Waurika		Thomas	
1950	Muskogee									Sayre		Thomas	
1949	Capitol Hill									Wynnewood		Medford	
1948	Muskogee									Watonga		Grandfield	
1947	Okmulgee									Dewey		Thomas	
1946	Tulsa Central									Fairview		Medford	
1945	Duncan									Woodward		Medford	
1944	Classen									Garber		Lone Wolf	

Starting in 1944, the Oklahoma High School Athletic Association (OHSAA) organized playoffs to determine a state champion in each school size classification.

- 1943 – Hollis
- 1941 – Muskogee
- 1940 – Muskogee
- 1939 – Central
- 1938 – Central
- 1935 – Muskogee
- 1933 – Capitol Hill
- 1932 – Shawnee
- 1926 – Central
- 1925 – Booker T. Washington (Negro), Muskogee
- 1924 – Booker T. Washington (Negro)
- 1923 – Muskogee Manual (Negro), Muskogee
- 1922 – Booker T. Washington (Negro)
- 1921 – Nowata Lincoln (Negro), Sapulpa
- 1920 – Nowata Lincoln (Negro), Lawton
- 1919 – OKC Central
- 1918 – OKC Central
- 1917 – OKC Central
- 1916 – Norman
- 1914 – OKC Central
- 1912 – Vinita
- 1911 – Norman
- 1910 – Muskogee
- 1909 – Lawton
- 1908 – Norman
- 1907 – Norman
- 1906 – Norman, OKC Central
- 1905 – OKC Central

=== Most state football championships ===
Team	Titles	Title Years (Fall)
Carl Albert	20	1989, 1993, 1997, 1998, 1999, 2000, 2001, 2004, 2006, 2009, 2012, 2016, 2017, 2018, 2019, 2020, 2022, 2023, 2024, 2025
Ada	19	1951, 1952, 1955, 1956, 1957, 1959, 1962, 1964, 1965, 1970, 1974, 1980, 1986, 1988, 1991, 1993, 1994, 1995, 1996
Jenks	18	1979, 1982, 1993, 1996, 1997, 1998, 1999, 2000, 2001, 2003, 2006, 2007, 2012, 2013, 2014, 2015, 2020, 2021
Clinton	17	1965, 1967, 1968, 1969, 1978, 1982, 1984, 1996, 1997, 2000, 2001, 2003, 2004, 2005, 2007, 2012, 2021
Morrison	14	1984, 1986, 1988, 1989, 1990, 1991, 1992, 1993, 1994, 2003, 2005, 2006, 2007, 2008
Shattuck	12	1991, 2003, 2004, 2005, 2006, 2007, 2008, 2011, 2015, 2017, 2018, 2019
Bixby	11	2014, 2015, 2016, 2018, 2019, 2020, 2021, 2022, 2023, 2024, 2025

== See also ==
- Oklahoma Secondary School Activities Association
