= List of botanical gardens and arboretums in Oklahoma =

This list of botanical gardens and arboretums in Oklahoma is intended to include all significant botanical gardens and arboretums in the U.S. state of Oklahoma

Name	Image	Affiliation	City
Cann Memorial Botanical Gardens			Ponca City
Cedarvale Botanic Garden and Restaurant			Davis
Garrard Ardeneum			McAlester
Hambrick Botanical Gardens			Oklahoma City
Honor Heights Park			Muskogee
Washington Irving Memorial Park and Arboretum			Bixby
Kerr Arboretum and Botanical Area			Talihina
Lendonwood Gardens			Grove
Jo Allyn Lowe Park			Bartlesville
Midwest City Hall Arboretum			Midwest City
Morrison Arboretum			Morrison
Myriad Botanical Gardens			Oklahoma City
North Central Oklahoma Cactus Botanical Garden			Covington
North Oklahoma Botanical Garden and Arboretum		Northern Oklahoma College	Tonkawa
The Botanic Garden at Oklahoma State University		Oklahoma State University	Stillwater
Oklahoma City Zoo and Botanical Garden			Oklahoma City
Philbrook Museum of Art			Tulsa
Tulsa Botanic Garden			Tulsa
Will Rogers Gardens			Oklahoma City
Woodward Park			Tulsa

== See also ==
- List of botanical gardens and arboretums in the United States
