= Morrison High School =

Morrison High School may refer to:

- Morrison Glace Bay High School, Nova Scotia, Canada
- Morrison High School (Illinois), Morrison, Illinois
- Morrison High School (Oklahoma), Morrison, Oklahoma
