= Hambrick =

Hambrick is a surname. Notable people with the surname include:

- Darren Hambrick (born 1975), American football player
- David Hambrick, American psychologist
- John Hambrick (1940–2013), American newscaster, reporter, actor, and voice over announcer
- Judd Hambrick (born 1945), American television newscaster/reporter
- Mike Hambrick, American television anchor and correspondent
- Troy Hambrick (born 1976), American football player

== See also ==
- Hambrick Botanical Gardens, botanical gardens in Oklahoma City, Oklahoma, US
