= Southmoore High School =

Location
- 2901 South Santa Fe Avenue; Moore, Oklahoma 73160; United States; 35°18′39″N 97°30′55″W

Information
- Established: 2008
- School district: Moore Public Schools
- Principal: Chealsi Conley
- Staff: 105.84 (on an FTE basis)
- Grades: 9–12
- Enrollment: 2,055 (2024–2025)
- Student to teacher ratio: 19.41
- Campus type: Suburban
- Colors: Vegas gold and navy
- Athletics conference: OSSAA Class 6A
- Mascot: SaberCats
- Rivals: Moore High School (Oklahoma); Westmoore High School
- Website: southmoorehs.mooreschools.com

Southmoore High School is an American four-year public high school located in Moore, Oklahoma, United States. It opened in the 2008–2009 academic year. The school is headed by one head principal and four class principals. The current head principal is Chealsi Conley. Southmoore High is a 6A1 division school. It is part of the Moore Public Schools district, and is the third high school in the district.

== Notable alumni ==
- Justin Bean, basketball player for Alba Berlin
- Cam Little, NFL kicker for the Jacksonville Jaguars
- Gervarrius Owens, NFL safety for the New York Giants
- Casey Thompson, college football quarterback for the Oklahoma Sooners
- Kendal Thompson, former quarterback for University of Oklahoma and University of Utah, played wide receiver for Washington Redskins (2016–2017) and Los Angeles Rams (2018)
