= North Oklahoma Botanical Garden and Arboretum =

Arboretum in Tonkawa, Oklahoma, US

Coordinates: 36.6784°N 97.2978°W

- Interactive map of North Oklahoma Botanical Garden and Arboretum
- Location: Tonkawa, Oklahoma
- Owner: Northern Oklahoma College

North Oklahoma Botanical Garden and Arboretum is a botanical garden and arboretum on the campus of Northern Oklahoma College, located at 1220 East Grand Avenue, Tonkawa, Oklahoma. It is an affiliate garden of the Oklahoma Botanical Garden and Arboretum and open to the public daily without charge.

The gardens were established in 1901 with the college's foundation, and were a top priority of the college's third president, Lynn Glover (1911-1916). The site includes an arboretum, butterfly display, and herb, perennial, rose, and sensory gardens. In February 1993 a Quonset greenhouse (2016 square feet) was added, with a 7,500 plant capacity for growing annual bedding plants. Since that time, 4,000 to 6,000 annual bedding plants have been planted each spring. In 1995, a mass planting of 150 redbuds marked the first annual Redbud Festival.

== See also ==
- List of botanical gardens and arboretums in Oklahoma
