= The Puterbaugh Center =

Gardens, museum, and event center in McAlester, Oklahoma, United States

Coordinates: 34°55′59″N 95°45′59″W

- Interactive map of The Puterbaugh Center
- Location: McAlester, Oklahoma
- Website: puterbaughcenter.com

The Puterbaugh Center, previously known as the Garrard Ardeneum, is located in McAlester, Oklahoma, United States. The center, which has also been called the McAlester Arboretum in confusion with an arboretum of this name in Missouri, was established 1990 as combination of an arboretum and a museum with landscaped gardens and historical artifacts. The center is located at 501 North 5th Street. The center now mainly serves as a wedding venue and conference center.

== See also ==
- List of botanical gardens and arboretums in Oklahoma
