= Newcastle High School (Oklahoma) =

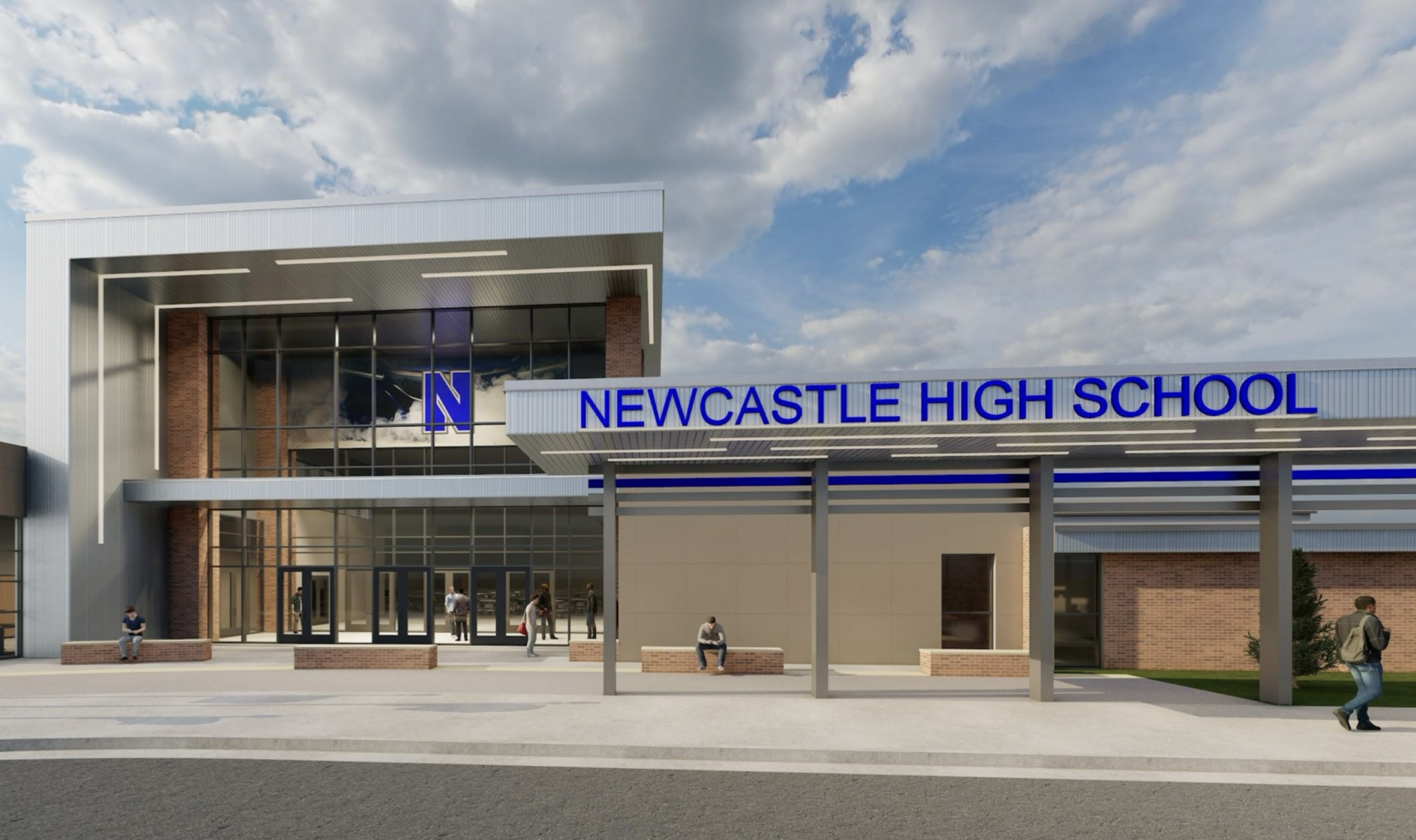

Location
- 101 North Main Street; Newcastle, Oklahoma 73065; United States; 35°14′53″N 97°36′08″W

Information
- Funding type: Public
- Established: 1923
- School district: Newcastle Public Schools
- Superintendent: Dr. Cathy Walker
- Principal: Adam Hull
- Grades: 9–12
- Colors: Royal blue, black and white
- Mascot: Racer
- Nickname: Racers
- Team name: Newcastle Racers
- Tuition: None
- Website: www.newcastle.k12.ok.us/newcastlehighschool_home.aspx

Newcastle High School is a public secondary school in Newcastle, Oklahoma, United States, serving students in grades 9 through 12. It is part of Newcastle Public Schools. The school's athletic teams are known as the Racers and compete in activities sanctioned by the Oklahoma Secondary School Activities Association (OSSAA).

== Academics ==
Newcastle High School offers a college-preparatory curriculum along with elective, career and technical education courses. Upper-level students may participate in concurrent enrollment programs and attend Mid-America Technology Center for career and technical education.

The school introduced the Aircraft Owners and Pilots Association (AOPA) You Can Fly aviation curriculum in 2023 as part of its science, technology, engineering and mathematics offerings.

Newcastle Public Schools operates on a four-day instructional week.

=== Graduation requirements ===
Students must complete the graduation requirements established by Newcastle Public Schools and the State of Oklahoma. Newcastle places incoming students on a college-preparatory curriculum, with an option to pursue the state's core curriculum with parental approval. Requirements include coursework in English, mathematics, science, social studies and additional electives.

== Awards ==
ACT Oklahoma 2011 College Readiness Award

- The recognition means each school has shown a significant increase in its ACT composite score over the past five years, while at the same time increasing the number of students taking the ACT assessment. The result is a greater number of Oklahoma students prepared for college.
- Only 5 percent of the high schools in Oklahoma were able to achieve the 2011 College Readiness Award. But, more than 76 percent of Oklahoma students took the ACT in 2011 – an all-time high.

== Extracurricular activities ==
Newcastle High School offers extracurricular programs in academics, fine arts, career and technical education, student leadership and service. Student organizations include Business Professionals of America (BPA), Family, Career and Community Leaders of America (FCCLA), FFA, National Honor Society, Student Council, academic teams, band, choir and robotics.

== Athletics ==
The Newcastle Racers compete in interscholastic athletics sanctioned by the Oklahoma Secondary School Activities Association (OSSAA). Sports offered include football, basketball, wrestling, baseball, fast-pitch and slow-pitch softball, volleyball, cross country, track and field, soccer, golf and competitive cheerleading.

Newcastle has won eight OSSAA team state championships in football, boys' basketball, girls' basketball, fast-pitch softball and competitive cheerleading.

=== Football ===
Newcastle won the Class 3A state football championship in 1992, defeating Marlow 21–11 in the championship game.

=== Basketball ===
The girls' basketball team won the OSSAA Class 4A state championship in 2016, defeating Harrah 62–53 in the championship game.

In 2026, both Newcastle basketball teams advanced to the OSSAA Class 5A state championship games against Carl Albert High School. The boys' team defeated Carl Albert 44–43 in overtime to win the Class 5A state championship, while the girls' team finished as Class 5A state runner-up after a 47–45 loss to Carl Albert.

=== Softball ===
The fast-pitch softball team has won three OSSAA Class 4A state championships, in 2014, 2019 and 2023.

=== Competitive cheerleading ===
The competitive cheerleading team won OSSAA Small Coed state championships in 2013 and 2015.

== History ==
=== Campus development ===
In December 2009, Newcastle Public Schools voters approved a $50.5 million bond issue for district facility improvements. Projects affecting Newcastle High School included construction of a 25,000-square-foot, 700-seat auditorium and a 9,500-square-foot library, as well as additional classroom space.

In August 2022, district voters approved two bond propositions totaling $79.75 million. The measures authorized $77.025 million for school facilities and $2.725 million for transportation equipment. Construction funded by the bond included a major expansion and renovation of Newcastle High School. The project added a new main entrance and administrative offices, cafeteria, freshman center, library, science facilities, Family and Consumer Sciences classrooms, student gathering spaces and a new band room that also serves as a storm shelter.

Additional projects funded through the 2022 bond included air conditioning for the high school gymnasium, new LED lighting at Racer Stadium, new band uniforms and instruments, and renovations to the school's baseball and softball facilities.

In August 2026, voters considered a $15 million bond proposal that included a $1.715 million expansion of Newcastle High School's aviation program and $5.405 million for a new soccer facility at Racer Stadium containing locker rooms, restrooms and concessions. The proposal received 54 percent of the vote but failed to reach the 60 percent required for passage.

== Notable alumni ==
- Anthony Sykes – Oklahoma State Senator, District 24
- Casey Thompson - Football Quarterback
- Casi Bays - College basketball coach and former two-time All-American basketball player
- McKenzie Wagoner Onyango - College softball player and coach; 2020 Gatorade Oklahoma Softball Player of the Year
