= Okeene Junior-Senior High School =

Location
- 301 N 6th Street; Okeene, Blaine, Oklahoma 73763; United States
- Coordinates: 36.1186480°N 98.3167387°W

Information
- Type: Public high school
- Established: 1901
- School district: Okeene Public Schools
- NCES District ID: 4022650
- School code: OK-06-I009-06-I009-715
- CEEB code: 372615
- NCES School ID: 402265029616
- Principal: Shane Feely
- Teaching staff: 13.25 (on an FTE basis)
- Grades: 7-12
- Enrollment: 101 (2023-2024)
  - Grade 7: 0
  - Grade 8: 0
  - Grade 9: 28
  - Grade 10: 35
  - Grade 11: 19
  - Grade 12: 19
- Student to teacher ratio: 7.62
- Campus type: Rural: remote
- Colors: Columbia blue, red, and white
- Fight song: Our Director
- Nickname: Whippets
- Rival: Hennessey
- USNWR ranking: 6,787
- Newspaper: The Whippet
- Feeder schools: Okeene Elementary School
- Website: www.okeene.k12.ok.us/page/jrsrhigh

Okeene Junior-Senior High school is a public junior/senior high school in Okeene, Oklahoma, United States. Established as a junior secondary school in 1901, it expanded to include an upper secondary school in the 1920s. In the 2022-2023 school year, it enrolled 152 students.

== Extracurricular activities ==
Student groups and organizations include band, FCCLA, FFA, National Honor Society, science club, speech, academic bowl, student council, and Technology Student Association.

The Okeene Whippets compete in OSSAA Class A, fielding teams in baseball, basketball, cheerleading, cross country, football, softball, and track. State championship titles held by the Whippets include:

- Girls' track: 2004, 2005, 2006, 2008
- Football: 1981 (Class B), 2006, 2007
- Boys' track: 2010, 2017
- Boys' basketball: 2007
