= Washington Irving Memorial Park and Arboretum =

Public park and arboretum in Bixby, Oklahoma

Coordinates: 35°57′39″N 95°52′42″W

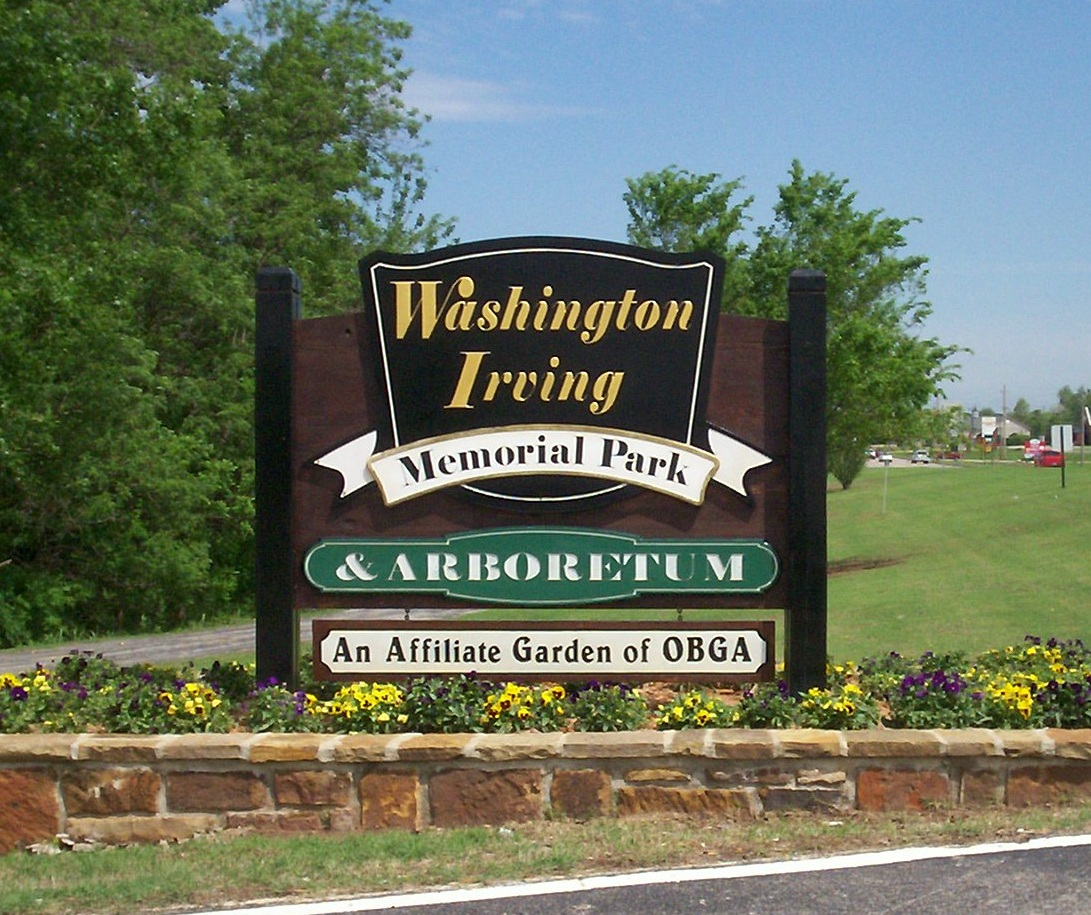
Welcome sign at Washington Irving Memorial Park and Arboretum

Washington Irving Memorial Park and Arboretum (32.5 acres) is a public park and arboretum located just north of the Arkansas River Bridge at 13700 S. Memorial Drive, Bixby, Oklahoma. The park is named in honor of American writer Washington Irving, who camped in the area in October 1832 while participating in a federal expedition to the American West led by Judge Henry L. Ellsworth of Connecticut. The expedition included a 31-day, 350-mile (560 km) circular tour of central Oklahoma.

== Overview ==
The park contains a wooded walking trail, the Laci Dawn Griffin Hill butterfly garden, and memorials to the children of the Alfred P. Murrah Federal Building bombing and to the September 11, 2001 attacks. It also contains a statue of Irving seated on an amphitheatre stage modeled after the facade of his home, Sunnyside in Tarrytown, New York.

== Irving in Oklahoma ==
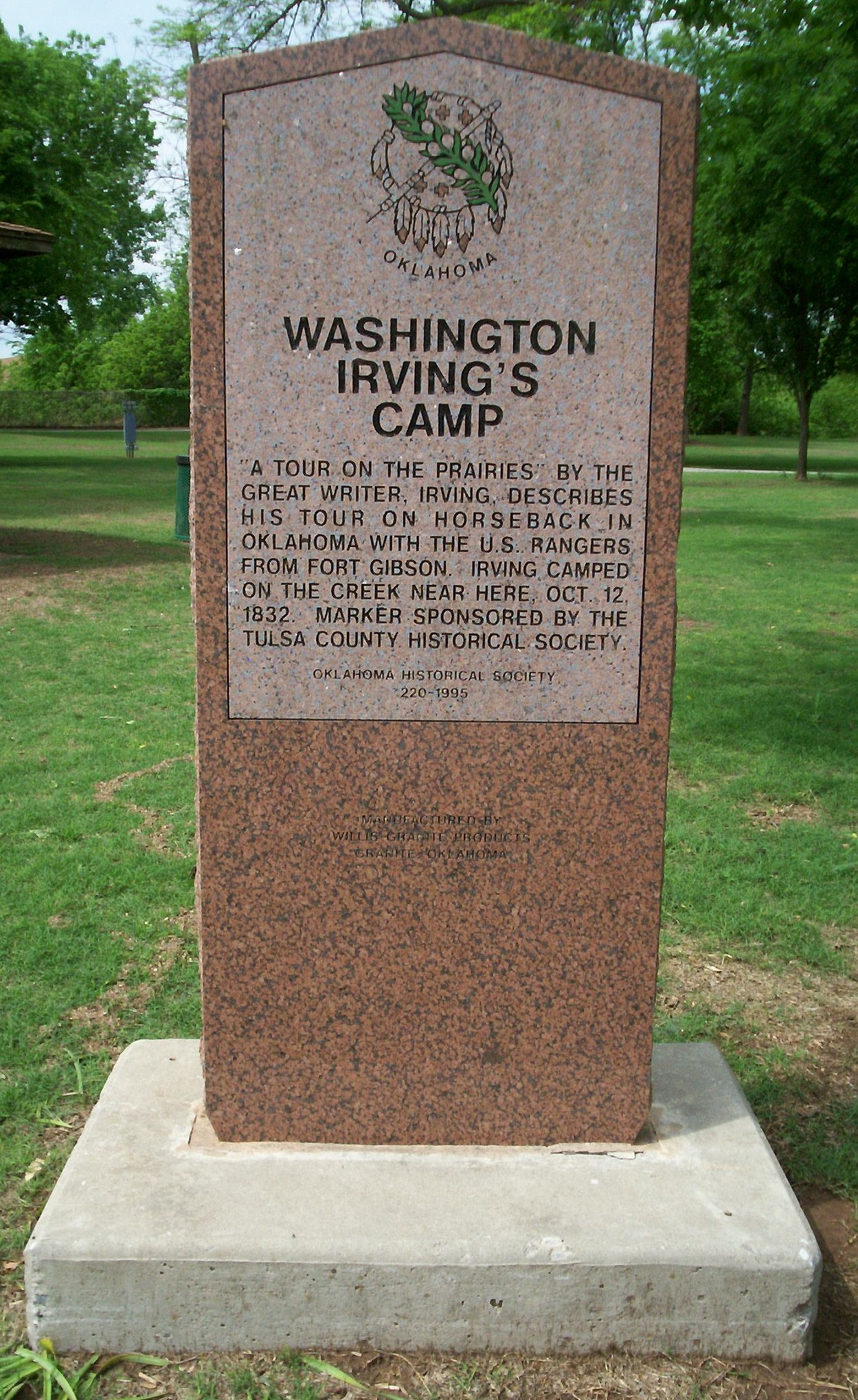
Historical marker noting Washington Irving's camp site in 1832

Ellsworth arrived at Fort Gibson in Oklahoma on October 8, 1832, along with Irving, naturalist Charles La Trobe, and Swiss nobleman Albert de Pourtalès. He promised the trio would have ample adventures in what was then Indian Territory. Irving had been absent from the United States for seventeen years before returning to New York only a few months earlier. Upon his return, he became interested in the country's efforts for westward expansion. Irving's experience in Oklahoma included scouting for prairie hens, hunting wolves, and trading with members of the Osage Nation. He also met Sam Houston, who Irving described as a "well formed fresh looking man".

Irving wrote of his experiences in Tour of the Prairies, published in 1835. The North American Review called the book "a sort of sentimental journey". The book was a popular success, and it was the author's first book written and initially published in the United States since A History of New York in 1809.

== See also ==
- List of botanical gardens and arboretums in Oklahoma
- List of botanical gardens and arboretums in the United States
