= Lake Carl Albert =

Reservoir in Oklahoma, United States

- Location within Oklahoma
- Coordinates: 34°46′19″N 95°04′08″W
- Etymology: Carl Albert (D-OK)
- Primary inflows: Rock Creek
- Catchment area: 6.03 square miles (15.6 km^{2})
- Basin countries: United States
- Built: Completed 1964
- Surface area: 183 acres (74 ha)
- Water volume: 5,424 acre-feet (6,690,000 m^{3}) max
- Surface elevation: 761 ft (232 m)
- Settlements: Talihina, Oklahoma

Lake Carl Albert is a reservoir in Latimer County, Oklahoma, United States. The lake was formed as a result of the Scs-Rock Creek Site-02 dam on Rock Creek and is used for flood control, drinking water and recreation purposes. Construction was completed in 1964. Its normal surface area is 183 acres (74 ha). It is owned by the town of Talihina.

== Etymology ==
The lake was named for Carl Albert, a native of McAlester, Oklahoma and a very popular politician. He represented his home district in the U. S. House of Representatives from 1947 until 1977, and at the peak of his political career, he was Speaker of the House from 1971 to 1977. After retiring from the House, Albert continued to maintain an office in McAlester, where he continued to work on public issues until his death in 2000.

== Description of lake and dam ==
The dam is of earthen construction and the core is assessed to be homogeneous earth. The foundation is reportedly soil. Its height is 60 feet (18 m) with a length of 1,520 feet (460 m). Maximum discharge is 1,050 cubic feet per second (30 m^{3}/s). Its capacity is 5,414 acre-feet (6,678,000 m^{3}). Normal storage is 2,739 acre-feet (3,379,000 m^{3}). Its watershed drains an area of 6.03 square miles (15.6 km^{2}) and has 4 miles (6.4 km) of shoreline.
