= Gervarrius Owens =

American football player (born 1999)

Profile
- Position: Safety

Personal information
- Born: October 14, 1999 (age 27); Moore, Oklahoma, U.S.
- Listed height: 6 ft 0 in (1.83 m)
- Listed weight: 200 lb (91 kg)

Career information
- High school: Southmoore (Moore, Oklahoma)
- College: Northeastern Oklahoma A&M (2018); Houston (2019–2022)
- NFL draft: 2023: 7th round, 254th overall pick

Career history
- New York Giants (2023–2024); Tennessee Titans (2024); Minnesota Vikings (2025)*; Chicago Bears (2025–2026)*
- * Offseason or practice squad member only

Awards and highlights
- First-team All-AAC (2021); Second-team All-AAC (2022)

Career NFL statistics as of 2024
- Total tackles: 1
- Fumble recoveries: 1
- Stats at Pro Football Reference

Gervarrius Owens (born October 14, 1999) is an American professional football safety. He has previously played for the New York Giants and Tennessee Titans. He played college football for the Northeastern Oklahoma A&M Golden Norsemen and Houston Cougars.

== Early life ==
Owens was born and initially grew up in Greenville, Mississippi before his family moved to Atlanta, Georgia and then to Moore, Oklahoma. He attended Southmoore High School. Owens was rated a three-star recruit and committed to play college football at Kansas State.

== College career ==
Owens enrolled at Kansas State during the summer of 2017, but did not report to the team. He transferred to Northeastern Oklahoma A&M College before the start of the season. Owens made 51 tackles with three interceptions as a freshman. After the season, he committed and later signed to transfer to Minnesota. Owens was later released from his National Letter of Intent in order to transfer to Houston.

Owens became a starter during his first season with the Houston Cougars. He was named first team All-American Athletic Conference (AAC) as a junior after making 52 tackles with two interceptions. Owens was named second team All-AAC as a senior.

== Professional career ==
Pre-draft measurables
Height	Weight	Arm length	Hand span	Wingspan	40-yard dash	10-yard split	20-yard split	20-yard shuttle	Three-cone drill	Vertical jump	Broad jump	Bench press
6 ft 0 3/8 in (1.84 m)	195 lb (88 kg)	32 in (0.81 m)	9 1/2 in (0.24 m)	6 ft 6 in (1.98 m)	4.57 s	1.54 s	2.53 s	4.09 s	6.75 s	37.5 in (0.95 m)	10 ft 5 in (3.18 m)	15 reps
All values from NFL Combine/Pro Day

=== New York Giants ===
Owens was selected in the seventh round, 254th overall, of the 2023 NFL draft by the New York Giants.

Owens was waived on August 28, 2024, and re-signed to the practice squad. He was released on October 29.

=== Tennessee Titans ===
On November 5, 2024, Owens was signed to the Tennessee Titans practice squad, and appeared in two games during the 2024 season. He signed a reserve/future contract on January 6, 2025.

On April 16, 2025, Owens was waived by the Titans.

=== Minnesota Vikings ===
On July 30, 2025, Owens signed with the Minnesota Vikings. He was waived on August 26 as part of final roster cuts.

=== Chicago Bears ===
On August 28, 2025, Owens was signed to the Chicago Bears' practice squad. On January 20, 2026, he signed a reserve/futures contract with the Bears. On August 8, Owens was waived by the Bears with an injury designation.
