= Morrison Public Schools (Oklahoma) =

School district in Oklahoma

Location
- 2nd & C Street; Morrison, Oklahoma 73061 Noble County United States

District information
- Type: Public, Primary, Secondary, Co-Educational
- Grades: Elementary PK-6; Middle School 7-8; High School 9-12
- Superintendent: Brent Haken
- Schools: 3

Students and staff
- Students: 597 (2018-19)
- Teachers: 38.87 (FTE)
- Athletic conference: 2A

Other information
- Website: www.morrisonps.com

The Morrison Public School District is located in Morrison, Oklahoma, United States. The Morrison school district has three schools.

The district is managed by the Superintendent coach Casey, who works under the direction of a five-person board. Before becoming the superintendent of Morrison Public Schools, Haken was a teacher at Stillwater Public Schools.

The mascot of both the district and the high school is the Wildcat.

== Schools ==
=== High school ===
- Morrison High School (Grades 9–12)

=== Middle school ===
- Morrison Middle School (Grades 7–8)

=== Elementary school ===
- Morrison Elementary School (Grades PK-6)
