= Kendal Thompson =

American football player (born 1992)

Profile
- Position: Wide receiver

Personal information
- Born: May 14, 1992 (age 34)
- Listed height: 6 ft 2 in (1.88 m)
- Listed weight: 196 lb (89 kg)

Career information
- High school: Southmoore (Moore, Oklahoma)
- College: Oklahoma (2011–2013); Utah (2014–2015)
- NFL draft: 2016: undrafted

Career history
- Washington Redskins (2016–2017)*; Los Angeles Rams (2018)
- * Offseason or practice squad member only
- Stats at Pro Football Reference

Kendal Thompson (born May 14, 1992) is an American former professional football wide receiver.

He played college football as a quarterback for the Oklahoma Sooners and Utah Utes, prior to his position change to wide receiver in preparation for the National Football League (NFL). He signed as an undrafted free agent with the Washington Redskins, and was later a member of the Los Angeles Rams.

He is the son of Charles Thompson, a famous Oklahoma quarterback, and the elder brother of Casey Thompson, who represented four college programs, including Oklahoma.

== Early life ==
As a standout at Southmoore High School, Thompson was an Elite 11 finalist and also earned all-America honors. He competed in the Under Armour All-America Game. After graduating high school early in December 2010, he enrolled at the University of Oklahoma in January 2011.

== College career ==
=== Oklahoma ===
Thompson was redshirted in 2011 and did not play in any games in 2012. As a redshirt sophomore in 2013, Thompson was slated to compete against redshirt junior Blake Bell and redshirt freshman Trevor Knight for the starting quarterback job. Thompson was forced to drop out of the quarterback derby after suffering a broken right foot during the first practice of fall camp. He was able to return during the 2013 season and made two appearances as a backup quarterback, including one during the Bedlam Series against the #6 ranked Oklahoma State Cowboys. On January 21, 2014, Thompson announced his intention to graduate from the University of Oklahoma in May and transfer to another college to play football as a graduate student.

=== Utah ===
Thompson transferred to the University of Utah and was eligible to play immediately after graduating from Oklahoma. He competed with junior Travis Wilson, who started 16 games at quarterback for Utah in the previous two seasons, for the starting quarterback job. It was expected that Wilson would win the quarterback competition and he was eventually named the starting quarterback over Thompson during fall camp. In a game against the #8 ranked UCLA Bruins on October 4, 2014, Thompson relieved Wilson after the offense started the game with three consecutive three-and-outs. Thompson would lead Utah to a 30–28 upset victory over UCLA. In the next game against the Oregon State Beavers, Thompson started the game, but was benched in favor of Wilson at halftime. Wilson would lead Utah to a double-overtime victory. On November 8, Thompson started the game against the #4 ranked Oregon Ducks, but he left the game after suffering a torn ACL. The knee injury ended his 2014 season.

== Professional career ==
=== Washington Redskins ===
Thompson signed with the Washington Redskins as an undrafted free agent on July 27, 2016. He was waived on September 3, and was signed to the practice squad the next day. After spending his entire rookie season on the practice squad, he signed a reserve/future contract with the Redskins on January 2, 2017.

On August 13, 2017, Thompson was waived/injured by the Redskins and placed on injured reserve. He was released on August 18.

=== Los Angeles Rams ===
On July 30, 2018, Thompson signed with the Los Angeles Rams. On August 31, Thompson was waived/injured by the Rams and placed on injured reserve. He was released on December 4, 2018.

== Personal life ==
Thompson is a member of the Kiowa tribe, gaining membership through his mother. In 2014, he went through a naming ceremony and received the name "Little Wolf". He is the older brother of Casey Thompson, who has also played quarterback for the Oklahoma Sooners. His parents are Charles and Kori Thompson. He is married to his high school sweetheart, Cate Thompson. They have 3 kids- Kynleigh, Kenzingtyn and Kingsten. Kendal Thompson [@kendalthompson10]; (June 7, 2021). "God is good!" – via Instagram. Kendal Thompson [@kendalthompson10]; (June 16, 2024). "Happy Father's Day" – via Instagram.
