= James Thrash =

American football player (born 1975)

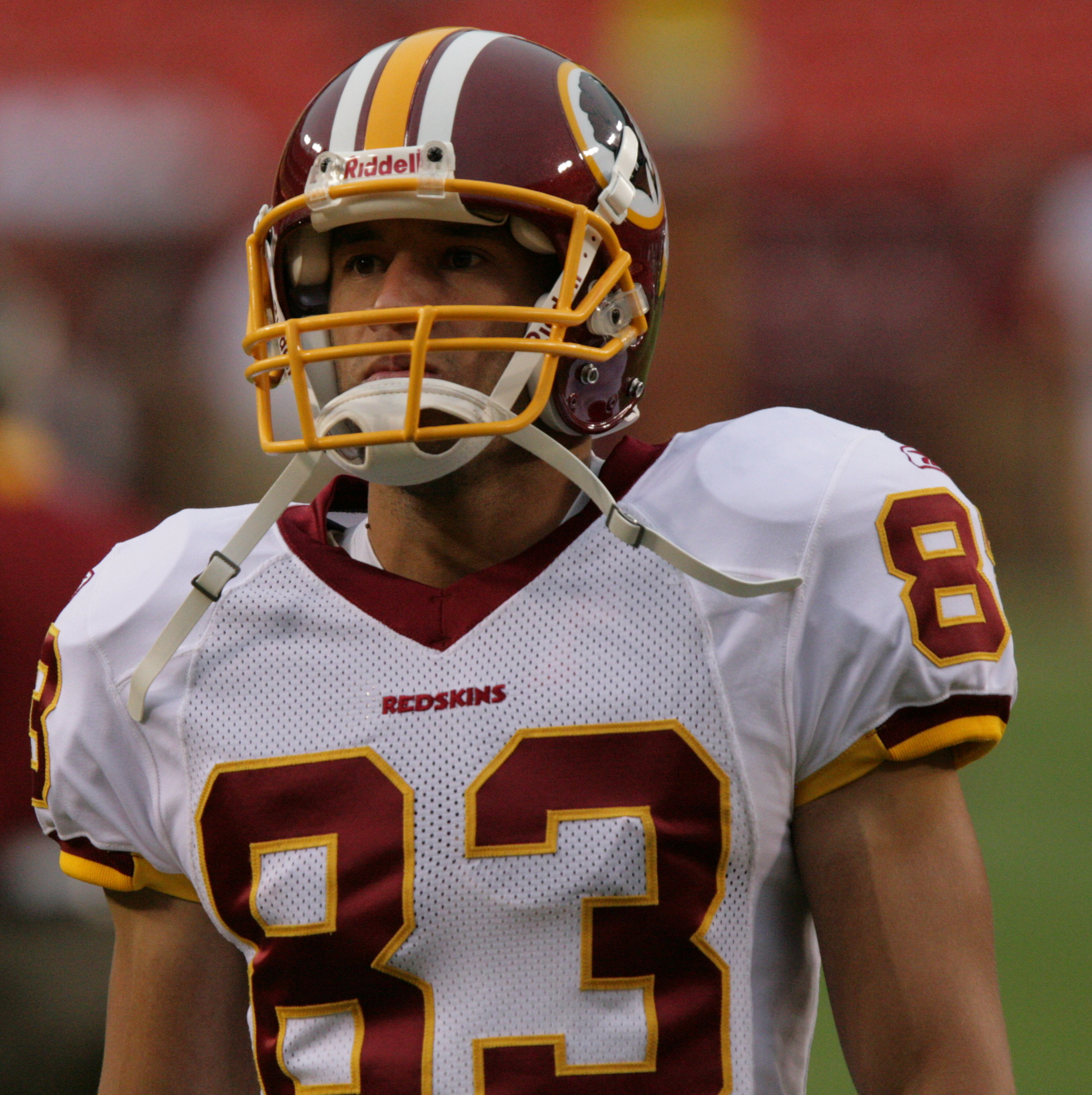
- Thrash with the Washington Redskins in 2006

No. 87, 80, 83
- Position: Wide receiver

Personal information
- Born: April 28, 1975 (age 51); Denver, Colorado, U.S.
- Listed height: 6 ft 0 in (1.83 m)
- Listed weight: 204 lb (93 kg)

Career information
- High school: Wewoka High School (Wewoka, Oklahoma)
- College: Missouri Southern (1993–1996)
- NFL draft: 1997: undrafted

Career history
- Philadelphia Eagles (1997)*; Washington Redskins (1997–2000); Philadelphia Eagles (2001–2003); Washington Redskins (2004–2008)
- * Offseason or practice squad member only

Career NFL statistics
- Receptions: 290
- Receiving yards: 3,646
- Receiving touchdowns: 22
- Stats at Pro Football Reference

James Ray Thrash (born April 28, 1975) is an American former professional football player who was a wide receiver in the National Football League (NFL). He was signed by the Philadelphia Eagles as an undrafted free agent in 1997. He played college football for the Missouri Southern Lions.

Thrash also played for the Washington Redskins. He currently works on the Commanders' player development staff.

== Early life ==
Thrash graduated from Wewoka High School in Wewoka, Oklahoma.

== Professional career ==
Pre-draft measurables
Height	Weight	Arm length	Hand span	40-yard dash	10-yard split	20-yard split
6 ft 0 1/8 in (1.83 m)	200 lb (91 kg)	32 1/2 in (0.83 m)	9 5/8 in (0.24 m)	4.59 s	1.65 s	2.65 s
All values from scouting report

Thrash was signed as an undrafted free agent out of Missouri Southern State University by the Philadelphia Eagles in 1997, but was quickly released and signed by the Washington Redskins during training camp.

Thrash played for four seasons with the Redskins before signing with the Eagles again. After three seasons with the Eagles, including two as their leading wide receiver, the Redskins traded a fifth round draft pick in 2005 to the Eagles to bring him back to Washington. The pick later became defensive end Trent Cole.

The Redskins released Thrash on June 12, 2009, after he failed his physical due to a neck injury.

== Personal life ==
Since retiring from the NFL, Thrash has worked on Christian evangelism, and has spoken at numerous churches. He is also a coach for the NVHAA Centurions in Manassas, Virginia. Most recently Thrash has joined the No More Organization to combat domestic violence and sexual assault. Thrash has been appointed as an appeals officer by the NFL since 2015.
