= Casey Thompson =

American football player (born 1998)

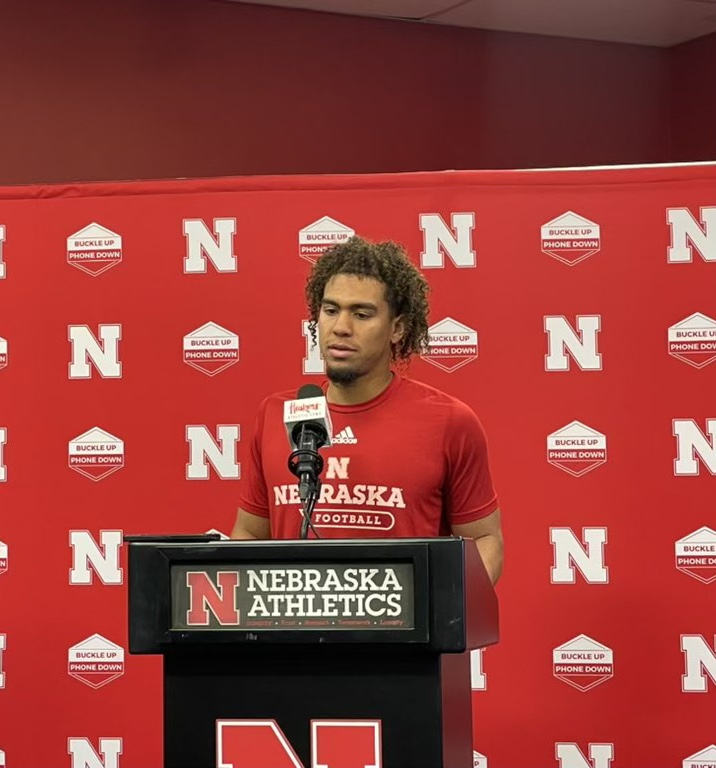
- Thompson with Nebraska in 2022

Dresden Monarchs
- Position: Quarterback

Personal information
- Born: October 3, 1998 (age 28); Oklahoma City, Oklahoma, U.S.
- Listed height: 6 ft 0 in (1.83 m)
- Listed weight: 205 lb (93 kg)

Career information
- High school: Southmoore (Moore, Oklahoma); Newcastle (Newcastle, Oklahoma)
- College: Texas (2018–2021); Nebraska (2022); Florida Atlantic (2023); Oklahoma (2024)
- NFL draft: 2025: undrafted

Career history
- Dresden Monarchs (2026–present)
- Stats at ESPN

Casey Thompson (born October 3, 1998) is an American football quarterback for the Dresden Monarchs of the German Football League. He played college football for the Texas Longhorns, Nebraska Cornhuskers, Florida Atlantic Owls, and Oklahoma Sooners.

== Early life ==
Thompson played his first three years of high school football at Southmoore High School in Moore, Oklahoma. During his last season at Southmoore he threw for 2,730 yards and 28 touchdowns. Prior to his 2017 senior season, Thompson transferred to Newcastle High School in Newcastle, Oklahoma, where he passed for 3,249 yards. As a four star recruit, Thompson committed to University of Texas at Austin on April 13, 2017.

== College career ==
=== Texas ===
During Thompson's first two years with the Longhorns, he served as the backup quarterback behind Sam Ehlinger. At the 2020 Alamo Bowl, Thompson entered the game after Ehlinger suffered an injury. During that game, Thompson went 8–10 with 170 yards and 4 touchdowns in the 55–23 blowout win over the Colorado Buffaloes. His four touchdowns tied the Alamo Bowl record.

After Ehlinger left for the NFL, Thompson competed with Hudson Card for the starting quarterback position. Card initially won the starting job, but Thompson was promoted to starter for week 3. In his first collegiate career start, he went 15-for-18 on pass attempts, threw for 164 yards, 2 touchdowns, and an interception in a 58–0 shutout victory over the Rice Owls. Thompson was the starter in a 70–35 victory over the Texas Tech Red Raiders, the first time the Longhorns scored 70 or more points in a game since 2005. Thompson started 10 games for the Longhorns and posted a 4–6 record. He threw for 2,113 yards and 24 touchdowns against nine interceptions while also tacking on another four touchdowns with his legs.

At the conclusion of the 2021 season, Thompson entered himself into the transfer portal after Ohio State quarterback Quinn Ewers committed to transfer to Texas. He would eventually transfer to Nebraska.

=== Nebraska ===
On January 7, 2022, Thompson announced his transfer to the University of Nebraska–Lincoln to play for the Cornhuskers.

In 2022, Thompson started 10 games, going 4–6 for Nebraska, but missed two games with an injury.

=== Florida Atlantic ===
On May 10, 2023, Thompson transferred to Florida Atlantic. After starting the first three games of the year, Thompson suffered a torn ACL in Florida Atlantic's 48–14 loss to the Clemson Tigers.

On December 21, 2023, Thompson announced that he would be entering the transfer portal for the third time.

=== Oklahoma ===
On January 11, 2024, Thompson announced his transfer to the University of Oklahoma for his final year of college eligibility. At Oklahoma, he played in just one game with the final kneel in OU's 24–3 win against the Alabama Crimson Tide on November 23.

=== Statistics ===
Year	Team	Games		Passing								Rushing			
Year	Team	GP	Record	Comp	Att	Pct	Yards	Avg	TD	Int	Rate	Att	Yards	Avg	TD
2018	Texas	Redshirt													
2019	Texas	4	0–0	8	12	66.7	84	7.0	0	0	125.5	10	22	2.2	1
2020	Texas	3	0–0	12	17	70.6	225	13.2	6	0	298.2	8	31	3.9	0
2021	Texas	12	4–6	165	261	63.2	2,113	8.1	24	9	154.7	55	157	2.9	4
2022	Nebraska	10	4–6	173	274	63.1	2,407	8.8	17	10	150.1	56	−21	−0.4	5
2023	Florida Atlantic	3	1–2	50	79	63.3	509	6.4	5	5	125.6	10	2	0.2	0
2024	Oklahoma	1	0–0	0	0	0	0	0	0	0	0	0	0	0	0
Career		33	9−14	408	643	63.5	5,338	8.3	52	24	152.4	139	189	1.4	10

== Professional career ==
Pre-draft measurables
Height	Weight	Arm length	Hand span	20-yard shuttle	Vertical jump	Broad jump
6 ft 0 in (1.83 m)	205 lb (93 kg)	30 5/8 in (0.78 m)	9 1/4 in (0.23 m)	4.28 s	33.0 in (0.84 m)	9 ft 5 in (2.87 m)
All values from Pro Day

Thompson went undrafted in the 2025 NFL draft.

=== Dresden Monarchs ===
On July 29, 2026, Thompson was signed by the Dresden Monarchs of the German Football League.

== Personal life ==
Thompson is the son of former Oklahoma quarterback Charles Thompson. He is the younger brother of former NFL wide receiver, Kendal Thompson.
