= David Hambrick =

American psychologist

David Z. Hambrick
- Citizenship: American
- Education: Methodist University (BS, 1994); Georgia Institute of Technology (MS, 1997; PhD, 2000)
- Known for: Research on practice and the 10,000-Hour Rule
- Awards: James McKeen Cattell Award for Outstanding Dissertation in Psychology from the New York Academy of Sciences (2001)
- Scientific career
- Fields: Cognitive psychology Experimental psychology
- Institutions: Michigan State University
- Thesis: Effects of domain knowledge, working memory capacity and age on cognitive performance (2000)
- Doctoral advisor: Randall Engle

David Zachary (Zach) Hambrick is a psychology professor at Michigan State University, known for his research on the effects of practice on proficiency in various skills. Hambrick's research has concluded that practice is important in explaining ability in fields such as chess, music, and academics, but less so than argued by other psychologists, notably K. Anders Ericsson. Hambrick contends that, in addition to amount of practice, working memory capacity is associated with better performance on a wide variety of tasks.
