= Talihina, Oklahoma =

Talihina, Oklahoma Tʋli Hina (Choctaw)
- Town
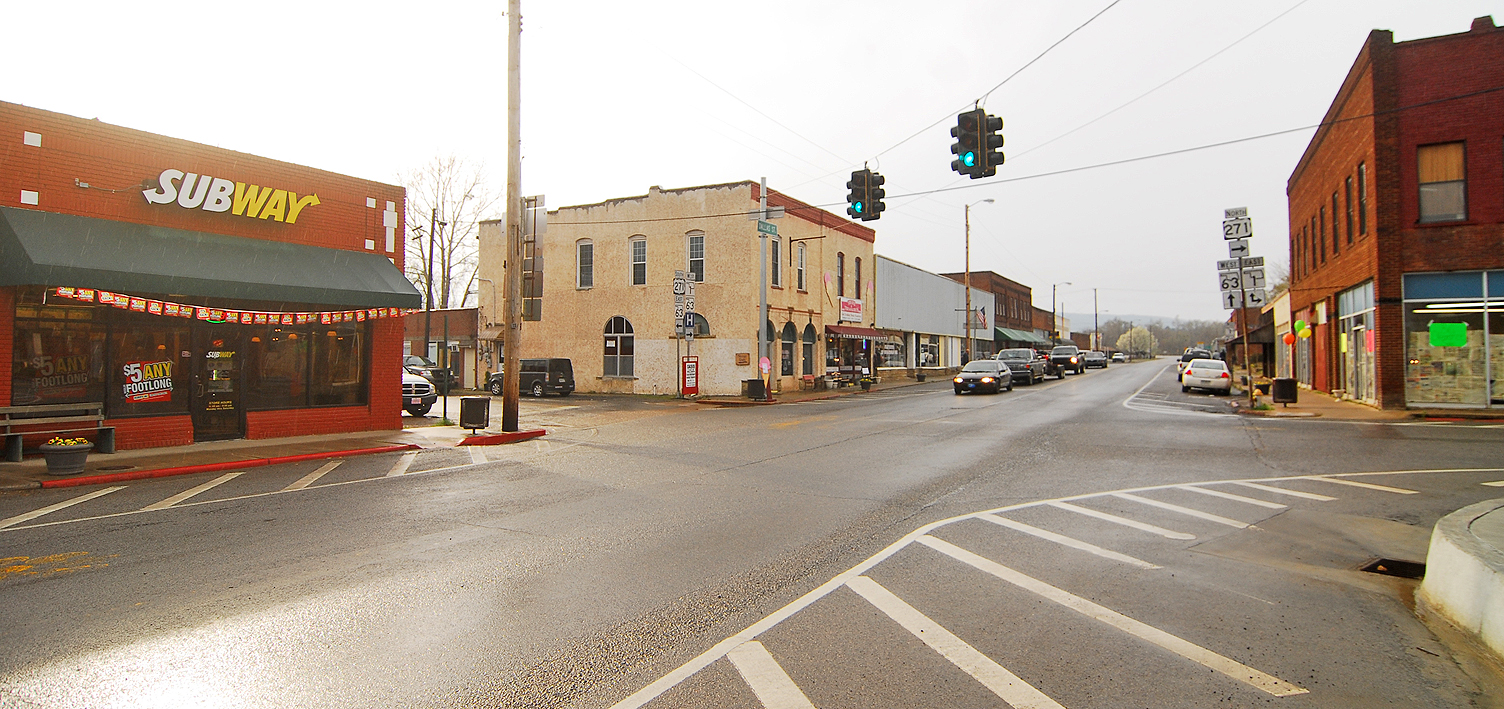
- historic downtown Talihina

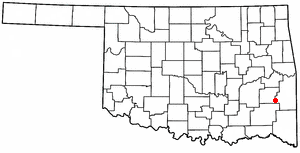
- Location of Talihina, Oklahoma
- Coordinates: 34°45′09″N 95°02′37″W
- Country: United States
- State: Oklahoma
- County: LeFlore County

Area
  - Total: 1.00 sq mi (2.58 km^{2})
  - Land: 0.99 sq mi (2.57 km^{2})
  - Water: 0.0077 sq mi (0.02 km^{2})
- Elevation: 692 ft (211 m)

Population (2020)
  - Total: 925
  - Density: 933.0/sq mi (360.25/km^{2})
- Time zone: UTC-6 (Central (CST))
  - Summer (DST): UTC-5 (CDT)
- FIPS code: 40-72250
- GNIS feature ID: 2413363
- Website: townoftalihina.org

Talihina (/ˌtɑːlɪˈhiːnə/ TAH-lih-HEE-nə) is a town in LeFlore County, Oklahoma, United States. Located on the Choctaw Reservation, its name originates from two Choctaw words, tully and hena, meaning "iron road," a reference to the railroad around which the town was built. The population was 925 at the time of the 2020 Census.

== History ==
The community was founded as a station stop on the St. Louis and San Francisco Railroad, which opened through the Indian Territory in June 1887. A post office opened at Talihina, Indian Territory on November 30, 1887. Talihina is the Choctaw Indian word for "Ironroad."

At the time of its founding, Talihina was located in Wade County, a part of the Apukshunnubbee District of the Choctaw Nation.

The railroad opened the surrounding area to ship cattle, timber, and cotton to Eastern markets and facilitated growth of the town. When Talihina incorporated in 1905, the town claimed a population of 400. Two major hospitals, the Choctaw-Chickasaw Tuberculosis Sanatorium and the Eastern Oklahoma State Tuberculosis Sanatorium, were built here between 1915 and 1921. By 1920, the population had grown to 690.

Tourism and recreation have been a major economic stimulus since the 1920s. Six lakes have been built in the Kiamichi Valley, attracting sportsmen and campers. Talimena State Park and Old Military Road historic site (National Register of Historic Places, NR 76002155) are 7 miles (11 km) northeast of Talihina. This is the western end of the Talimena Scenic Drive, which runs to Mena, Arkansas and attracts many people to view the fall foliage.

The Choctaw Nation Health Center was constructed in Talihina in 1999.

== Geography ==
Talihina is located in the Kiamichi Valley between the Kiamichi and Winding Stair Mountains, approximately 39 miles (63 km) southwest of Poteau, the LeFlore County seat.

According to the United States Census Bureau, the town has a total area of 0.8 square miles (2.1 km^{2}), all land.

== Demographics ==
Historical population
Census	Pop.	Note	%±
1910	491		—
1920	690		40.5%
1930	1,032		49.6%
1940	1,057		2.4%
1950	965		−8.7%
1960	1,048		8.6%
1970	1,223		16.7%
1980	1,387		13.4%
1990	1,297		−6.5%
2000	1,270		−2.1%
2010	1,114		−12.3%
2020	925		−17.0%
U.S. Decennial Census

=== 2020 census ===
As of the 2020 census, Talihina had a population of 925. The median age was 39.8 years. 25.2% of residents were under the age of 18 and 21.0% of residents were 65 years of age or older. For every 100 females there were 85.7 males, and for every 100 females age 18 and over there were 76.5 males age 18 and over.

0.0% of residents lived in urban areas, while 100.0% lived in rural areas.

There were 384 households in Talihina, of which 32.6% had children under the age of 18 living in them. Of all households, 30.5% were married-couple households, 21.4% were households with a male householder and no spouse or partner present, and 41.7% were households with a female householder and no spouse or partner present. About 36.4% of all households were made up of individuals and 18.7% had someone living alone who was 65 years of age or older.

There were 530 housing units, of which 27.5% were vacant. The homeowner vacancy rate was 4.0% and the rental vacancy rate was 22.0%.

Racial composition as of the 2020 census
Race	Number	Percent
White	402	43.5%
Black or African American	12	1.3%
American Indian and Alaska Native	408	44.1%
Asian	7	0.8%
Native Hawaiian and Other Pacific Islander	1	0.1%
Some other race	6	0.6%
Two or more races	89	9.6%
Hispanic or Latino (of any race)	27	2.9%

=== 2000 census ===
As of the census of 2000, there were 1,211 people, 463 households, and 292 families residing in the town. The population density was 1,445.4 inhabitants per square mile (558.1/km^{2}). There were 548 housing units at an average density of 654.1 per square mile (252.5/km^{2}). The racial makeup of the town was 54.75% White, 1.07% African American, 37.16% Native American, 0.08% Asian, 0.17% from other races, and 6.77% from two or more races. Hispanic or Latino of any race were 1.16% of the population.

There were 463 households, out of which 30.5% had children under the age of 18 living with them, 40.8% were married couples living together, 16.0% had a female householder with no husband present, and 36.9% were non-families. 33.3% of all households were made up of individuals, and 17.7% had someone living alone who was 65 years of age or older. The average household size was 2.50 and the average family size was 3.21.

In the town, the population was spread out, with 29.4% under the age of 18, 8.1% from 18 to 24, 22.0% from 25 to 44, 20.4% from 45 to 64, and 20.1% who were 65 years of age or older. The median age was 38 years. For every 100 females, there were 88.9 males. For every 100 females age 18 and over, there were 83.5 males.

The median income for a household in the town was $20,875, and the median income for a family was $25,761. Males had a median income of $19,688 versus $17,216 for females. The per capita income for the town was $10,405. About 23.7% of families and 29.2% of the population were below the poverty line, including 42.7% of those under age 18 and 13.1% of those age 65 or over.

== Points of interest ==
- Kerr Arboretum and Botanical Area
- Talimena Scenic Drive
- Lake Carl Albert, to the northwest of town.

== Notable people ==
The following were born in Talihina:

- Lane Adams, who played Major League Baseball for the Atlanta Braves, among others, before retiring in 2022
- JD McPherson, rockabilly singer, songwriter and musician
- Bob Neighbors, Major League Baseball player, killed in the Korean War
- Shawn Pittman, blues rock singer and songwriter

== In popular culture ==
The song Talihina Sky by Kings of Leon was featured as a hidden track on the band's 2003 debut album, Youth and Young Manhood. The three brothers and cousin who comprise the band Kings of Leon have roots in Talihina, along with Nashville, Tennessee. "Talihina Sky" also became the name of their DVD documentary, about their upbringing, featuring the annual Followill Talihina reunion.
