= Kerr Arboretum and Botanical Area =

Arboretum and nature preserve near Talihina, Oklahoma

Coordinates: 34°41′38″N 94°37′54″W

- Interactive map of Kerr Arboretum and Botanical Area
- Type: Arboretum, Nature preserve
- Location: Ouachita National Forest
- Nearest town: Talihina, Oklahoma
- Area: 8,026 acres (32.48 km^{2})

The Robert S. Kerr Memorial Arboretum, Nature Center and Botanical Area is a 8,026 acres (32.48 km^{2}) arboretum and nature preserve in the Ouachita National Forest, near Talihina, Oklahoma, containing plant communities significant in their occurrence, variety, and location. The area is bordered by U.S. 270-59 and Forest Road 6007 on the north and the Talimena Scenic Byway (east of U.S. 259) to the west and south.

The arboretum features dwarf white oaks, yellow buckeye, Ouachita indigo, and grass seeps. It is open for hiking, equestrianism, sightseeing, photography, nature study, bird watching, and hunting (area within the Nature Center's boundary excluded). Facilities include three short interpretive trails, flush toilets, drinking water fountain, the Pine Valley Trailhead, State Line Monument, and Castle Rock vista. No developed recreation facilities are found here, and there are few, if any, signs. Mountain bikes, hang gliders, and motorized vehicles are not permitted.

== See also ==
- List of botanical gardens and arboretums in the United States
