= The Botanic Garden at Oklahoma State University =

Botanical garden and arboretum in Stillwater, Oklahoma

Coordinates: 36.1207°N 97.1026°W

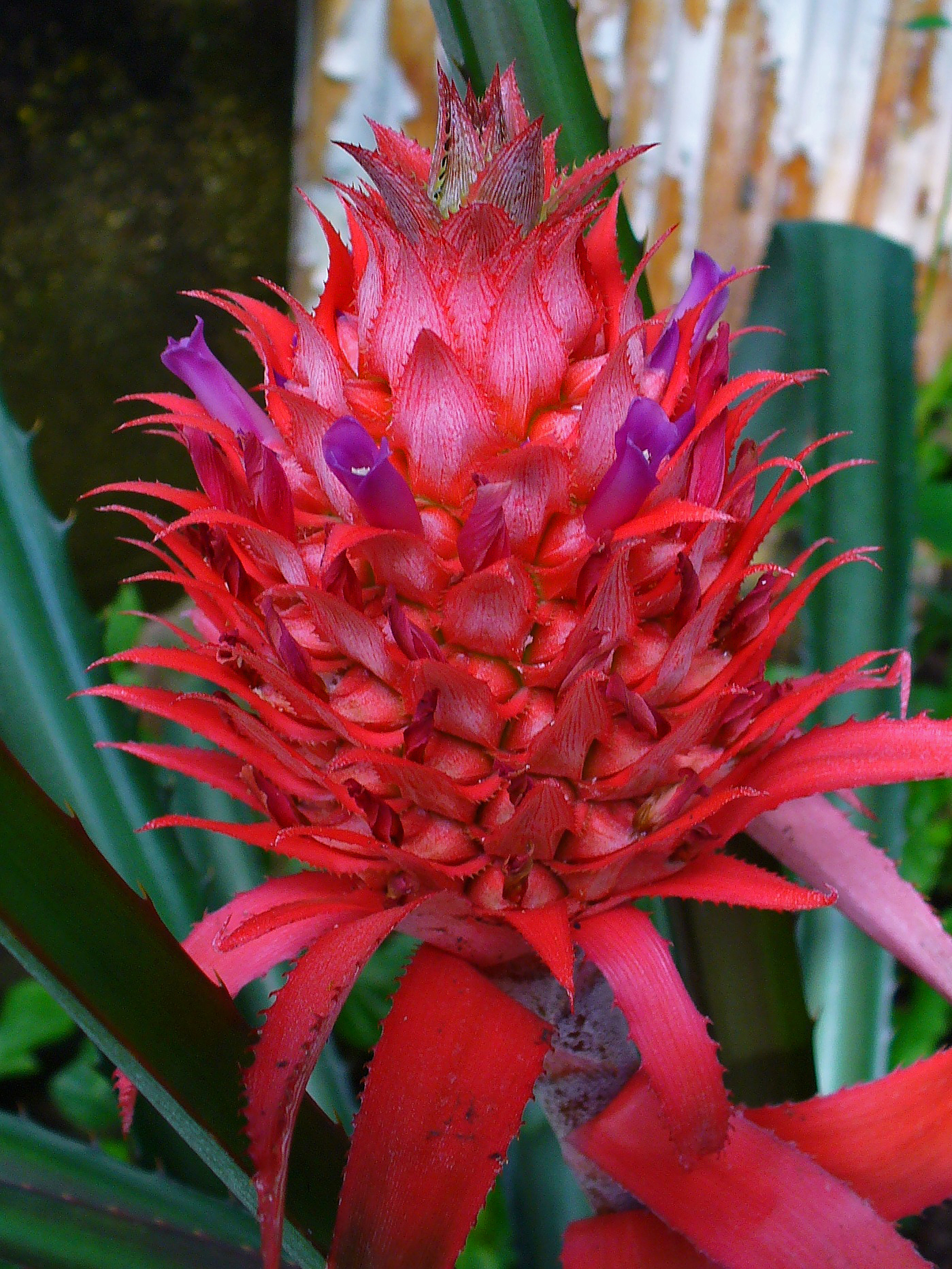
- Ananas comosus is just one of the species at the garden.
- Interactive map of The Botanic Garden at Oklahoma State University
- Location: Stillwater, Oklahoma
- Area: 100 acres (40 ha)
- Owner: Oklahoma State University
- Website: botanicgarden.okstate.edu

The Botanic Garden at Oklahoma State University is a 100 acres (40 ha) botanical garden and arboretum located just west of the Oklahoma State University campus, Stillwater, Oklahoma. It is open from dawn to dusk daily.

The garden features over 1,000 species of herbaceous and woody plants apportioned between the Oklahoma Gardening studio gardens (5 acres), and turf and nursery research. Display gardens include annuals and perennials, water garden, rock garden, butterfly garden, wildscape garden, Japanese tea garden, and yearly theme gardens.

== See also ==
- List of botanical gardens and arboretums in Oklahoma
