= Morrison High School (Oklahoma) =

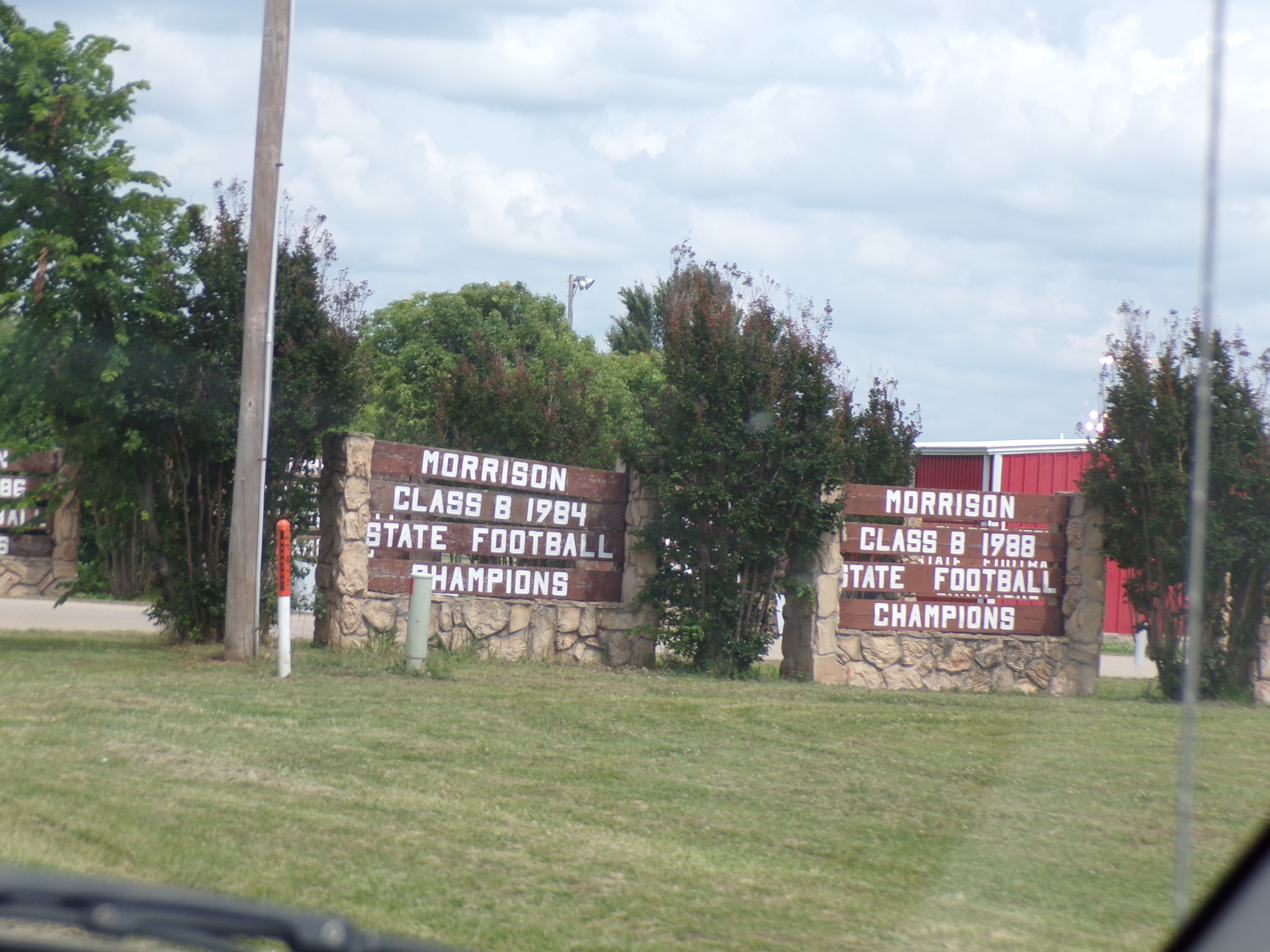

Location
- 2nd & C Street; Morrison, Oklahoma 73061; United States; 36.2991°N 97.0064°W

Information
- Type: Public, secondary school
- School district: Morrison Public Schools
- Principal: Nic Hoover
- Teaching staff: 14.42 (on an FTE basis)
- Grades: 9-12
- Gender: Co-educational
- Enrollment: 187 (2023-2024)
- Student to teacher ratio: 12.97
- Colors: Black and Red
- Athletics conference: OSSAA Class 2A
- Mascot: Wildcat
- Website: Morrison Public Schools

Morrison High School is a public secondary school in Morrison, Oklahoma, United States. It is located at 2nd & C Street in Morrison, Oklahoma and the only high school in Morrison Public Schools.

== Extracurricular activities ==
=== Athletics ===
- Basketball
- Baseball
- Cheerleading
- Football
- Softball - Slow Pitch
- Softball - Fast Pitch
- Track
- Wrestling
