= Morrison Arboretum =

Arboretum in Morrison, Oklahoma, United States

Coordinates: 36.2968°N 97.0127°W

- Interactive map of Morrison Arboretum
- Type: Arboretum
- Location: Morrison, Oklahoma

The Morrison Arboretum is an arboretum located in Morrison, Oklahoma. The arboretum is open to the public daily without charge.

The arboretum's plantings include Acer truncatum, Aesculus pavia, Betula nigra, Cercis canadensis, Celtis occidentalis, Cupressus nootkatensis, Fraxinus pennsylvanica, Ginkgo biloba, Ilex 'Nellie R. Stevens', Juniperus virginiana, Magnolia grandiflora, Metasequoia glyptostroboides, Morus alba 'Chaparral', Nyssa sylvatica, Platanus × hispanica, Quercus muehlenbergii, Quercus nigra, Quercus shumardii, Taxodium distichum, and Ulmus pumila.

== See also ==
- List of botanical gardens in the United States
