= Rejoice Christian School =

Christian school in Owasso, Oklahoma

Location
- 13407 E 106th St N Owasso, Oklahoma 74055; United States; 36°18′32″N 95°49′25″W

Information
- Type: Private
- Religious affiliation: Christian
- Denomination: Interdenominational
- Founded: 1992; 34 years ago
- Superintendent: Joel Pepin
- Principal: Rita Woolf
- Teaching staff: 48.0 (FTE) (2017–18)
- Grades: PreK–12
- Enrollment: 691 (K–12); 184 (Pre-K) (2017–18)
- Student to teacher ratio: 14.4:1 (2017–18)
- Colors: Blue & Gold
- Mascot: Eagle
- Affiliations: Association of Christian Schools International (ACSI); Oklahoma Private Schools Accreditation Commission (OPSAC)
- Website: rejoiceschool.com

Rejoice Christian School is a private PreK-12 Christian school located in Owasso, Oklahoma. There are over 850 students on roll.

== History ==
Rejoice Christian School was founded in 1992 by the First Free Will Baptist Church. It started as a pre-school and a kindergarten with only 40 students but eventually began serving all grade levels.

In 2014, Rejoice Christian School received a $50 million donation from the Eddy Gibbs Family Trust, allowing them to consolidate into one campus.

== Academics ==
Rejoice Christian School is accredited by the ACSI.

The Advanced Placement (AP) courses offered are Calculus AB, Psychology, World History, and English Literature and Composition.

== Demographics ==
The demographic breakdown by race/ethnicity of the 691 K–12 students enrolled for the 2017–2018 school year was:

Enrollment by Race/Ethnicity
School Year	American Indian / Alaska Native	Asian	Black	Hispanic	Native Hawaiian / Pacific Islander	White	Two or More Races
2017–18	85 (12.3%)	7 (1%)	14 (2%)	12 (1.7%)	0 (0%)	570 (82.5%)	0 (0%)
