= Afton High School =

High school in Oklahoma, United States

Coordinates: 36.688736°N 94.959433°W

Location
- 410 S Main; Afton, Oklahoma, United States

Information
- School type: Community school
- Teaching staff: 11.57 (FTE)
- Gender: Co-Educational
- Enrolment: 151 (2023-2024)
- Student to teacher ratio: 13.05
- Education system: American Curriculum
- Language: English
- Colors: Orange and black
- Mascot: Eagle

Afton High School is located in the town of Afton, Oklahoma, United States. Its mascot is the eagle and it has an enrollment of 156 students.
