= Wewoka High School =

High school in Wewoka, Oklahoma

Coordinates: 35.1475°N 96.4960°W

Wewoka High School is in Wewoka, Oklahoma. It is categorized as Distant Rural and has a student body with mixed heritage. In 2025 it had 125 students in grades 9 to 12. Scores on state tests are lower than average.

== History ==
Wewoka Mission School, also known as Ramsey Mission School, was established near Wewoka for the Seminole Nation in Indian Territory. Emahaka School for Girls, Emahaka Academy, Emahaka Mission, and Melasukey Academy also served the area.

W.W. Isle was schools superintendent and Clay Riggins was principal in 1920.

In 1924 a three-story reinforced concrete school building was planned.

During segregation, Frederick Douglass High School was established for African American students in Wewoka and surrounding areas in Seminole County. Frederick Douglass Moon was its principal before he moved on to Frederick Douglass High School in Oklahoma City. Oklahoma State's first black football player, running back Chester Pittman, attended the school. Other alumni include Juanita Kidd Stout, a state supreme court justice, civil rights leader and Oklahoma's first black ophthalmologist John Brown, and physician Thurml Banks.

The school's journalism classes compiled Barking Water, The Story of Wewoka published in 1960.

== Sports ==
Tigers are the school mascot.

Red Robertson was a basketball coach at the school. Cliff Speegle was a football coach at the school.

In 2022, two girls played for the football team.

In 2022 its basketball team played on the state 2A title game.

== Alumni ==
- James Thrash, football player
- Jean Hill
- Vance Trimble, journalist
- Jacqulyn Longacre leader of Planned Parenthood in Tulsa, Oklahoma

== See also ==
- List of high schools in Oklahoma
