= Will Rogers Gardens =

Park and gardens in Oklahoma City

Coordinates: 35.5022296°N 97.5808454°W

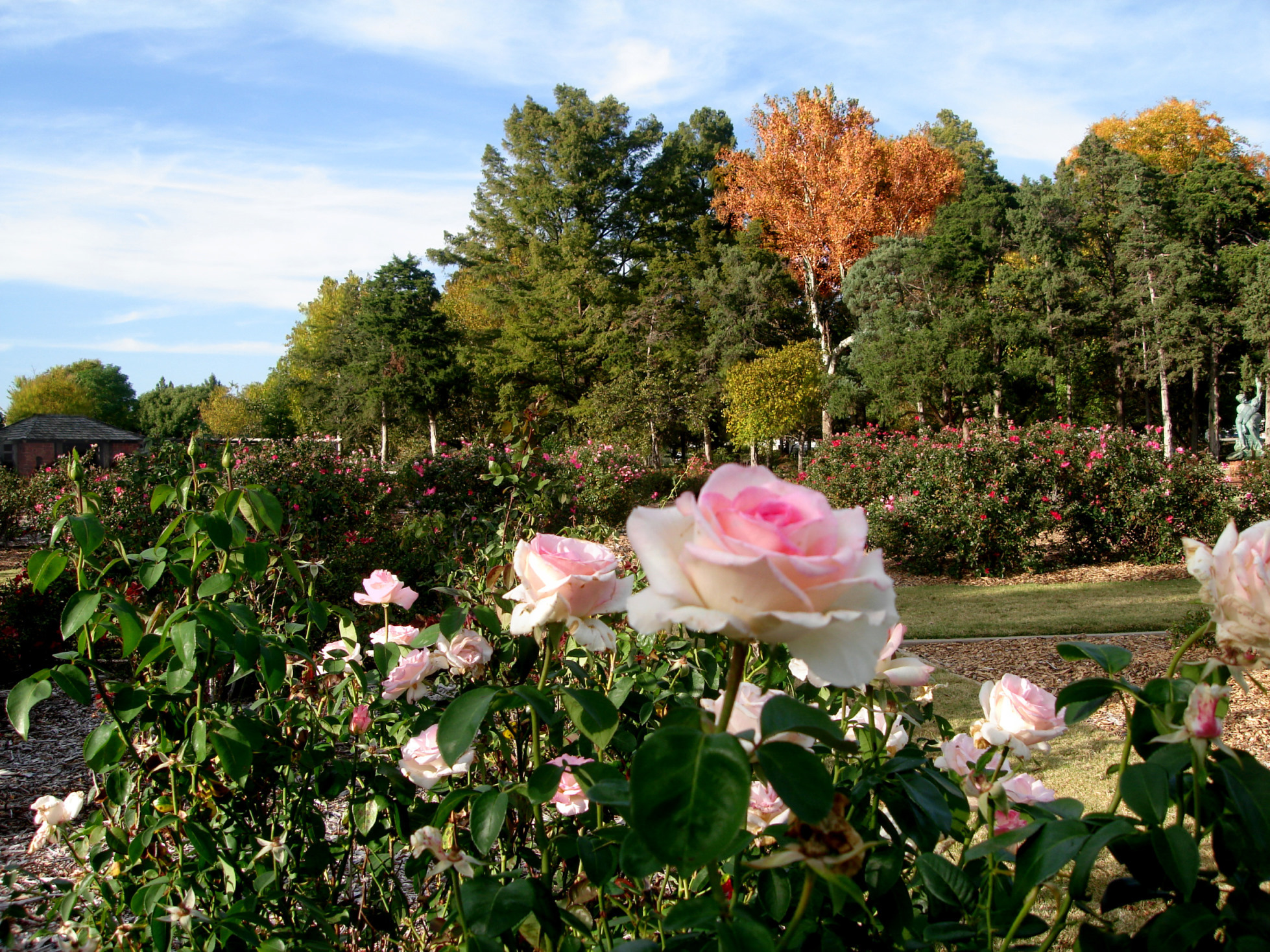
- Interactive map of Will Rogers Gardens
- Location: Oklahoma City
- Area: 30-acre (12 ha)
- Open: Open year-round
- Other information
- Will Rogers Park Gardens and Arboretum
- U.S. National Register of Historic Places
- U.S. Historic district
- Location within Oklahoma
- Location: 3400-3500 NW 36th St., Oklahoma City, Oklahoma
- Area: 32 acres (13 ha)
- Built: 1933
- Architect: Walter, Henry; et.al.
- Architectural style: Late Gothic Revival, Modern Movement
- NRHP reference No.: 05001000
- Added to NRHP: September 7, 2005
- Website: Official website

Will Rogers Gardens is a 30-acre (12 ha) park in Oklahoma City located at the corner of 36th Street and Portland Avenue. The park is one of the city's historic parks and is open year-round. Will Rogers Gardens features the Charles E. Sparks Rose Garden, a 7-acre (2.8 ha) arboretum and a conservatory with a cacti and succulent collection. It also features display beds of daylilies, iris, azaleas, herbs and peonies.

Gardening and nature related classes for all ages and other events are often held in the Garden Exhibition Building, the main building at Will Rogers Gardens. The Gardens, Conservatory and rooms in the Exhibition center are also available to rent for weddings and other events.

Will Rogers Gardens is part of Will Rogers Park, which features a family aquatics center, the 24-court Oklahoma City Tennis Center, a disk golf course, and one of Oklahoma City's two senior adult recreation centers.

== History ==
Will Rogers Gardens is listed on the National Register of Historic Places. Originally one of the four “crown jewels” at the old outer edges of Oklahoma City, the site remains a community garden with historic dedication to horticultural displays and areas of formal design.

- 1912- City leaders purchased 160 acres (65 ha) of land once used as a dairy farm.
- 1932- Parks Department Horticulturist Henry Walters began developing the site. Throughout the 1930s, Walters worked with the Civilian Conservation Corps (CCC) and the Work Projects Administration (WPA).
- 1936- The Ed Lycan Conservatory, originally built in 1924 at Douglas Park, was moved to Will Rogers Gardens.
- 1938- Will Rogers Gardens became home to the Oklahoma City Council of Garden Clubs. The Oklahoma Rose Society planted the 2-acre (8,100 m^{2}) rose garden with 3,000 rose bushes.
- 1940-The rose garden was named the Oklahoma City Municipal Rose Garden and was modernized in 1950.
- 1963- The Will Rogers Garden Exhibition Center was built.
- 1986- The Rose Garden was renamed the Charles E. Sparks Rose Garden in honor of a Parks Department supervisor who worked in the rose garden.
- 1987- Will Rogers Gardens received a large collection of cacti and succulent as a gift from Charles and Mary Polaski.

== Ed Lycan Conservatory ==
The Ed Lycan conservatory was designed by architects Lord and Burnham and was first erected in Douglass Park in 1924. In 1936 the conservatory was moved to Will Rogers Park. The greenhouse was named after Ed Lycan, the first employee for the Oklahoma City Parks Department. He worked for the department from 1912 to 1954, spending much of his time at Will Rogers Gardens

== Will Rogers Garden Exhibition Building ==
The Garden Exhibition Building in Will Rogers Park is home to the Oklahoma City Council of Garden Clubs. The Council was organized in 1921 to promote horticulture, flower gardening and conservation. Classes and other events are often held in the Garden Exhibition Building as well.

== Events ==
The site is host to several flower shows and sales, in addition to a Festival in the Park held on the last Saturday in May. Local garden and horticulture groups use the Exhibition Building to conduct monthly educational meetings that are open to the public.

== Education ==
The site conducts classes and tours by arrangement. Scheduled events include horticulture, drawing and flower arranging classes.

== Visitor Information ==
Will Rogers Gardens and Margaret Annis Boys Arboretum are open to the public with free admission: October 1-March 31 from 8:00am–5:00pm and April 1-September 30 from 8:00am– 8:00pm. The Ed Lycan Conservatory and Plaza is open to the public with free admission Monday through Friday 8:00 am to 5:00 pm. The Garden Exhibition Building is open Monday to Friday 8:00 am to 5:00 pm. Office hours are Monday-Friday 8:00am– 12:00pm and 1:00pm–5:00pm. Reservations and rental information by appointment. The site is located at 3400 NW 36th, OKC, OK 73112

== Gallery ==
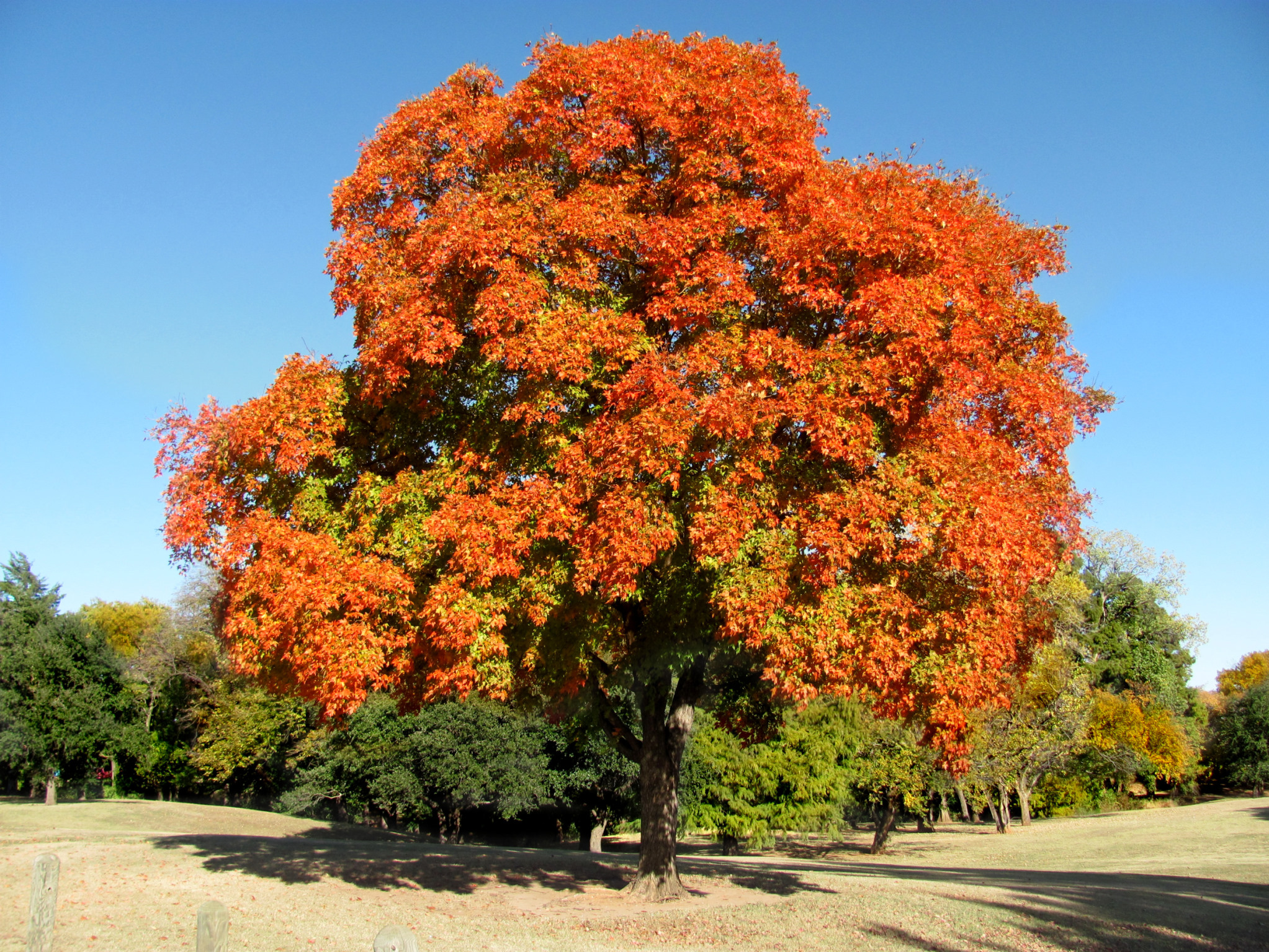
Many species of trees in the park.

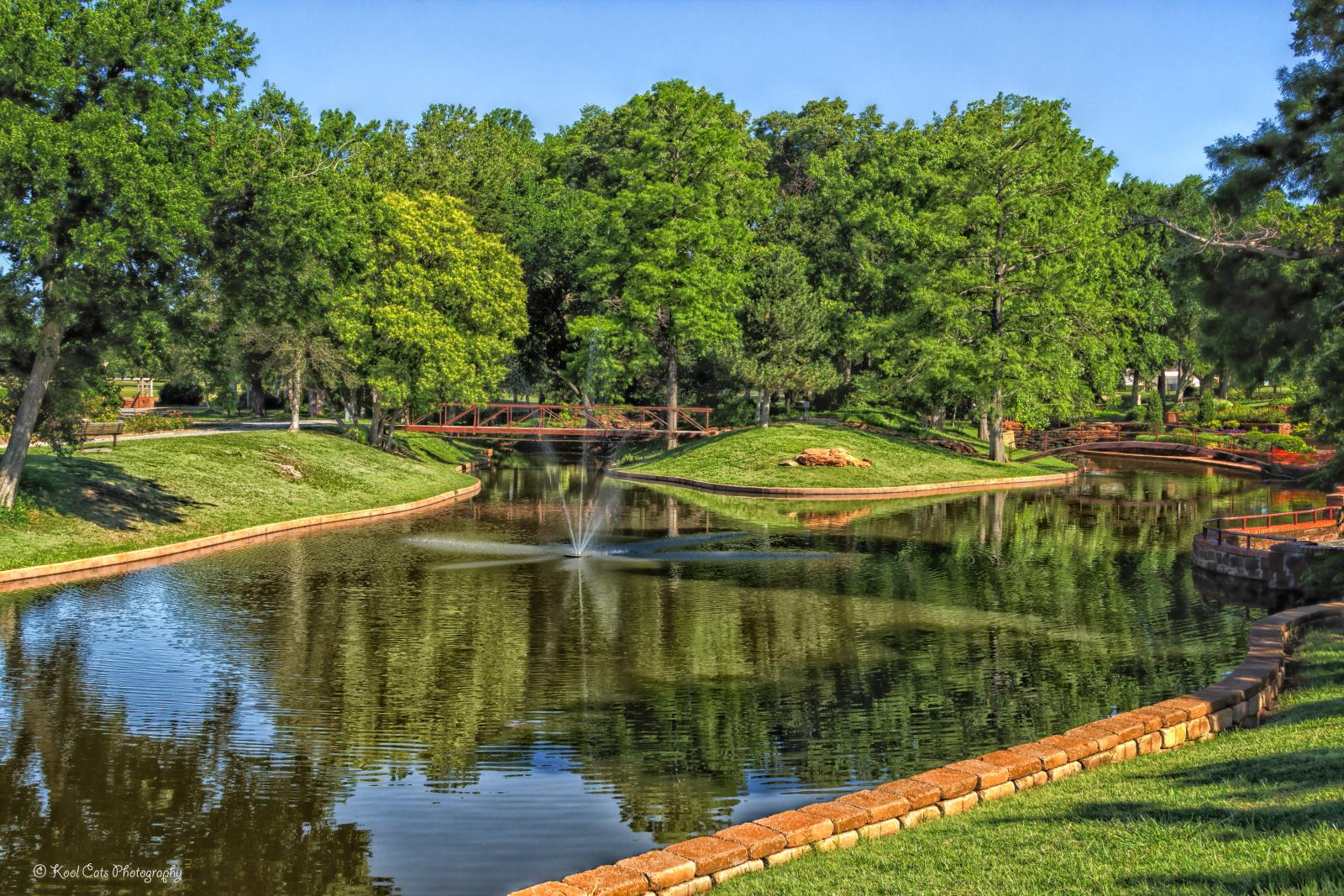
A pond with a fountain.

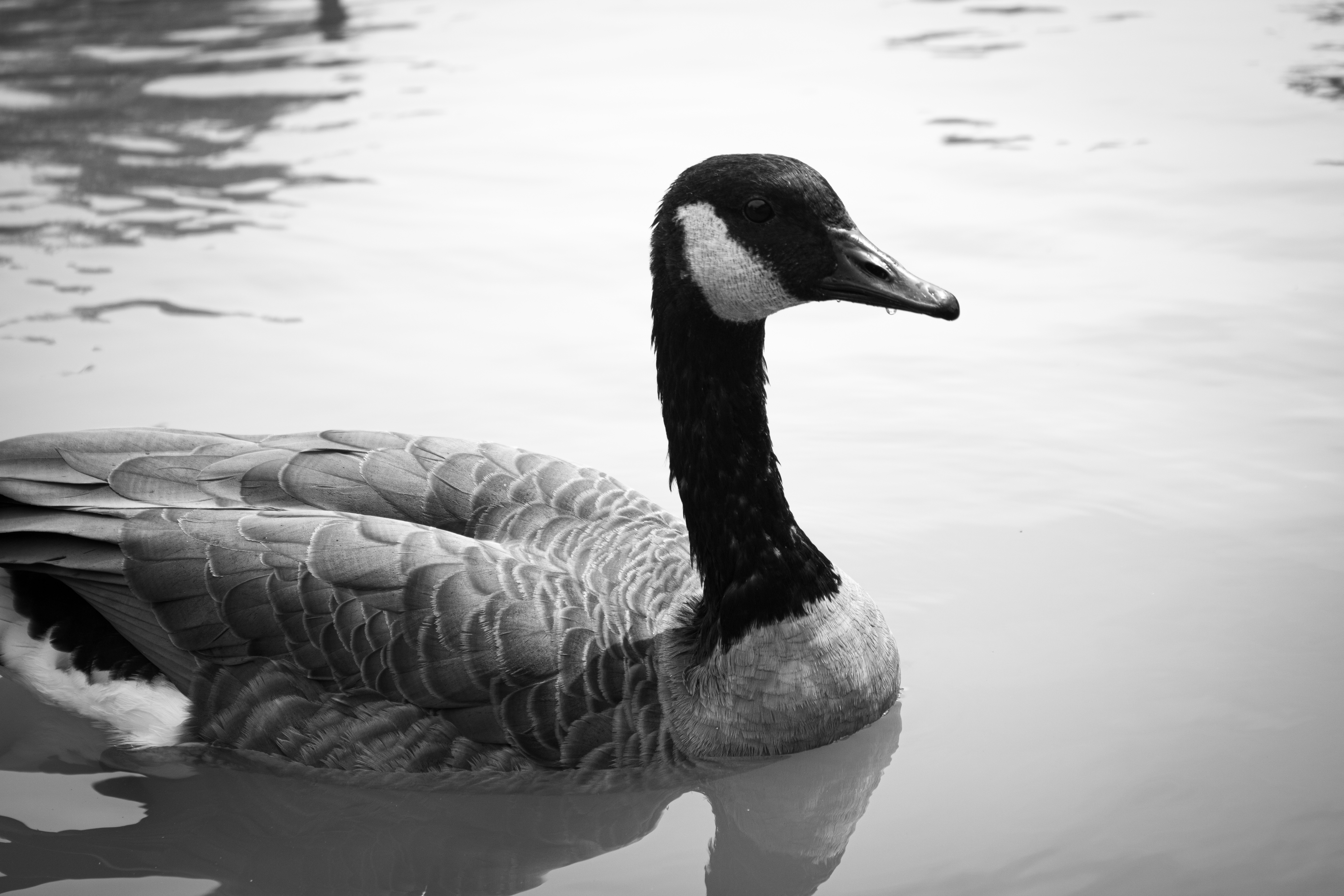
A goose swimming in a pond.

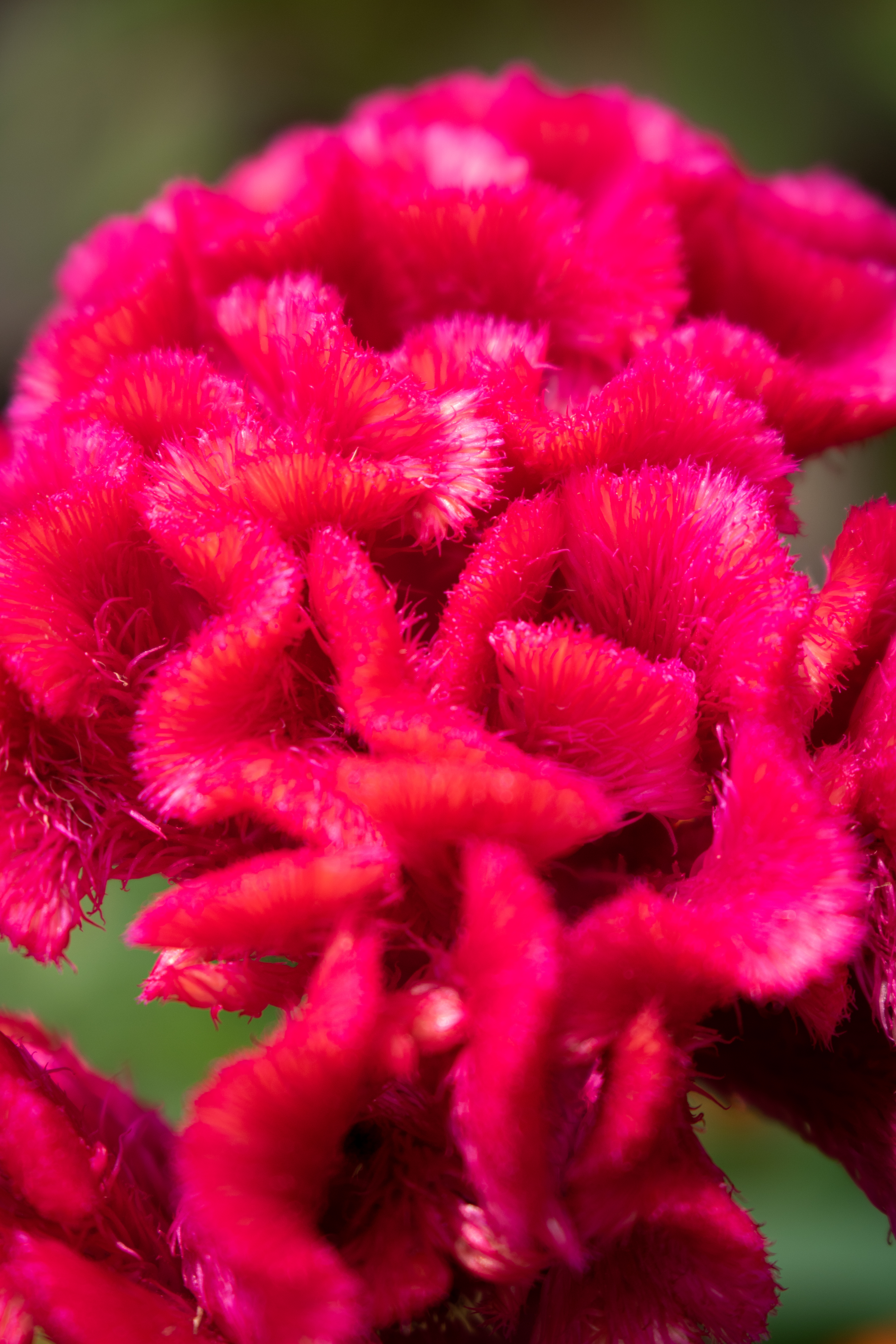
Close-up of a flower.

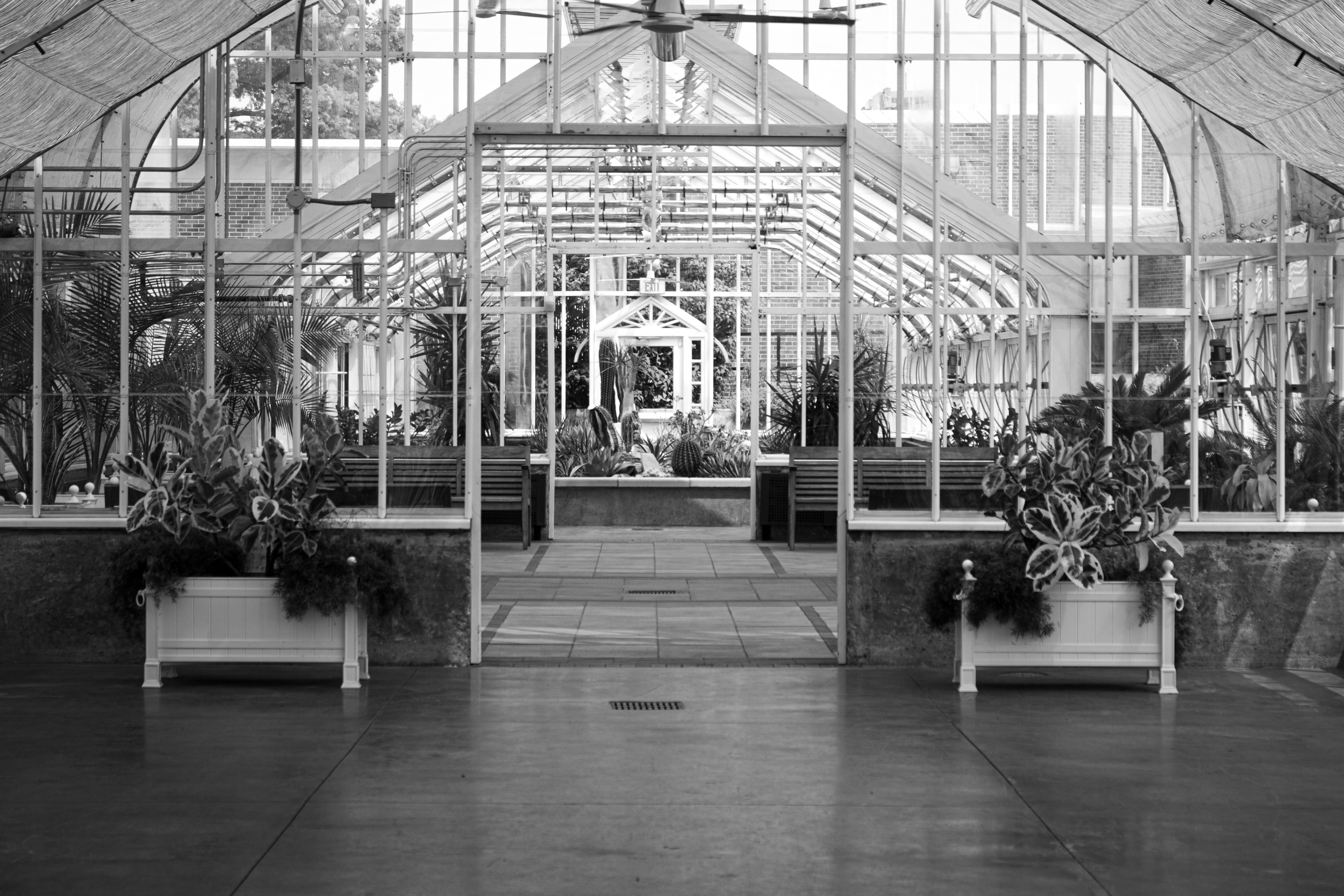
View of the conservatory.

== See also ==
- List of botanical gardens in the United States
