= Hambrick Botanical Gardens =

Garden in Oklahoma City, Oklahoma

Coordinates: 35°32′08″N 97°28′59″W

The Hambrick Botanical Gardens are botanical gardens located on the grounds of the National Cowboy & Western Heritage Museum, 1700 NE 63rd Street, Oklahoma City, Oklahoma.

There are four gardens on the grounds: the Norma Sutherland Garden with waterfall, ponds, and natural vegetation; the Atherton Garden; the Western States Plaza with flower beds and water feature; and the Hambrick Garden with streams, trees, flower beds, and sculptures including Paint Mare and Filly.

== See also ==
- List of botanical gardens and arboretums in the United States
