= Morrison, Oklahoma =

- Town
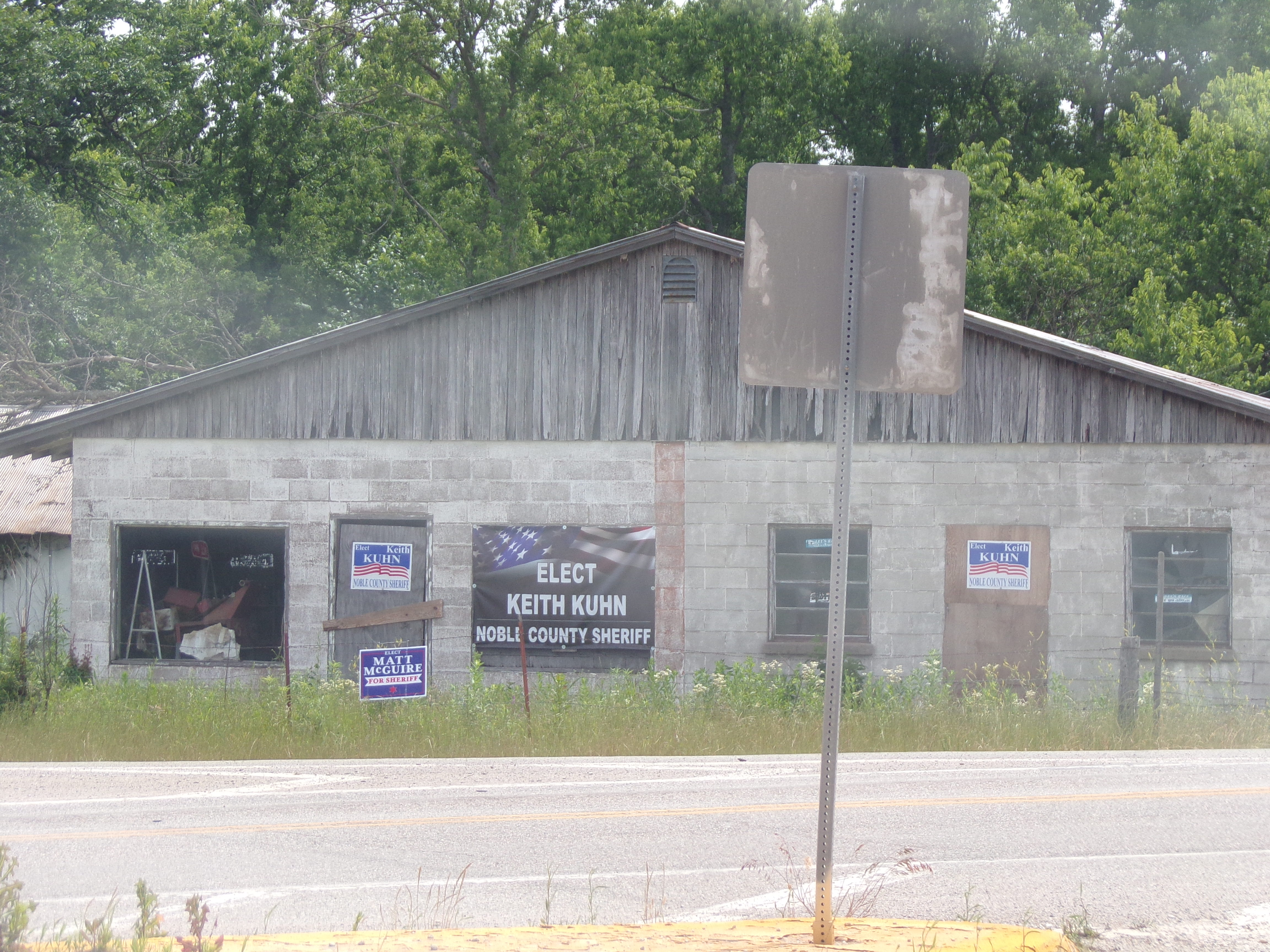
- Advertising flyer on a building in Morrison

- Location of Morrison, Oklahoma Morrison, Oklahoma (the United States)
- Coordinates: 36°17′36″N 97°01′06″W
- Country: United States
- State: Oklahoma
- County: Noble

Area
  - Total: 1.39 sq mi (3.61 km^{2})
  - Land: 1.39 sq mi (3.61 km^{2})
  - Water: 0 sq mi (0.00 km^{2})
- Elevation: 935 ft (285 m)

Population (2020)
  - Total: 723
  - Density: 519/sq mi (200.2/km^{2})
- Time zone: UTC-6 (Central (CST))
  - Summer (DST): UTC-5 (CDT)
- ZIP code: 73061
- Area code: 580
- FIPS code: 40-49450
- GNIS feature ID: 1095526
- Website: www.townofmorrisonok.com

Morrison is a town in southeastern Noble County, Oklahoma, United States. As of the 2020 census, Morrison had a population of 723.

== History ==
Morrison is located in the former Cherokee Outlet, which was created for the Cherokee Nation in 1835 from former Osage hunting grounds. The Outlet was opened to non-Indian settlement by the Cherokee Strip Land Run in September 1893. The Morrison community emerged in 1894 on land that was once the Osage tribe's hunting grounds.

Roselda Morrison, wife of James Morrison, owned the land upon which the town emerged. Nearby, a man named Autry (for whom the township was named) built a store, which received a postal designation as Autry in 1893. The post office was renamed Morrison in February 1894, after James Morrison bought the store. Morrison donated 40 acres (16 ha) for a town, which was surveyed and platted in August 1894. The town of Morrison incorporated on August 13, 1894.

The Morrison business district moved a short distance south in 1902, when the Arkansas Valley and Western Railroad (after 1907 a part of the St. Louis and San Francisco Railway system, or Frisco,) surveyed its Tulsa-Pawnee-Perry-Enid line. The railroad laid its tracks through the town in the same year. With railroad access, Morrison became an agricultural center, serving ranchers and wheat farmers.

Morrison's economy was enhanced when oil prospectors discovered large natural gas fields in Pawnee County, east of Morrison, between 1915 and 1919. These were the largest fields discovered in Oklahoma up until that time. Pipelines collected the gas and moved it to Oklahoma City. Oil was discovered north of Morrison in 1923. These discoveries protected the town from the post-World War I agricultural depression that affected many other Oklahoma farm towns.

== Geography ==
Morrison is 16 miles (26 km) east of Perry.

According to the United States Census Bureau, the town has a total area of 0.6 square miles (1.6 km^{2}), all land.

== Demographics ==
Historical population
Census	Pop.	Note	%±
1910	327		—
1920	353		8.0%
1930	284		−19.5%
1940	333		17.3%
1950	297		−10.8%
1960	256		−13.8%
1970	421		64.5%
1980	671		59.4%
1990	640		−4.6%
2000	636		−0.6%
2010	733		15.3%
2020	723		−1.4%

=== 2020 census ===
As of the 2020 census, Morrison had a population of 723. The median age was 37.3 years. 29.7% of residents were under the age of 18 and 13.7% of residents were 65 years of age or older. For every 100 females there were 87.3 males, and for every 100 females age 18 and over there were 89.6 males age 18 and over.

0.0% of residents lived in urban areas, while 100.0% lived in rural areas.

There were 285 households in Morrison, of which 41.4% had children under the age of 18 living in them. Of all households, 52.6% were married-couple households, 15.4% were households with a male householder and no spouse or partner present, and 24.9% were households with a female householder and no spouse or partner present. About 21.7% of all households were made up of individuals and 10.6% had someone living alone who was 65 years of age or older.

There were 321 housing units, of which 11.2% were vacant. The homeowner vacancy rate was 4.3% and the rental vacancy rate was 7.4%.

Racial composition as of the 2020 census
Race	Number	Percent
White	569	78.7%
Black or African American	10	1.4%
American Indian and Alaska Native	48	6.6%
Asian	1	0.1%
Native Hawaiian and Other Pacific Islander	0	0.0%
Some other race	2	0.3%
Two or more races	93	12.9%
Hispanic or Latino (of any race)	32	4.4%

=== 2000 census ===
As of the census of 2000, there were 636 people, 255 households, and 179 families residing in the town. The population density was 1,009.2 inhabitants per square mile (389.7/km^{2}). There were 274 housing units at an average density of 434.8 per square mile (167.9/km^{2}). The racial makeup of the town was 89.15% White, 0.31% African American, 2.83% Native American, 0.47% Asian, 2.67% from other races, and 4.56% from two or more races. Hispanic or Latino of any race were 4.25% of the population.

There were 255 households, out of which 36.1% had children under the age of 18 living with them, 51.8% were married couples living together, 14.9% had a female householder with no husband present, and 29.8% were non-families. 27.8% of all households were made up of individuals, and 10.6% had someone living alone who was 65 years of age or older. The average household size was 2.49 and the average family size was 3.06.

In the town, the population was spread out, with 29.4% under the age of 18, 8.6% from 18 to 24, 28.6% from 25 to 44, 22.3% from 45 to 64, and 11.0% who were 65 years of age or older. The median age was 34 years. For every 100 females, there were 85.4 males. For every 100 females age 18 and over, there were 80.3 males.

The median income for a household in the town was $28,482, and the median income for a family was $35,417. Males had a median income of $31,618 versus $17,045 for females. The per capita income for the town was $13,393. 15.1% of the population and 13.5% of families were below the poverty line. Out of the total population, 17.6% of those under the age of 18 and 3.7% of those 65 and older were living below the poverty line.

== Education ==
The Morrison Public Schools include Morrison Elementary School, Morrison Middle School, and Morrison High School.

=== Sports ===
Morrison is home to the Wildcats, who have won 13 eight-man football state championships and one Class A state championship (08'). (1984, 1986, 1988, 1989, 1990, 1991, 1992, 1993, 1994, 2003, 2005, 2006, 2007, 2008) The Wildcats won 90 consecutive games, from 1988 to 1995.

== Points of interest ==
- Morrison Arboretum
