= Oklahoma Secondary School Activities Association =

Governing body of high school athletics in Oklahoma

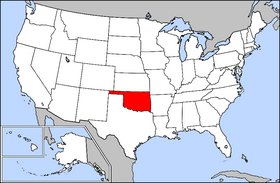
- Abbreviation: OSSAA
- Formation: 1910
- Type: Volunteer; NPO
- Legal status: Association
- Purpose: Athletic/Educational
- Headquarters: 7300 N. Broadway Extension; Oklahoma City, OK 73113
- Region served: Oklahoma
- Members: 482 schools
- Executive Director: David Jackson
- Affiliations: National Federation of State High School Associations
- Staff: 15
- Website: ossaa.com
- Remarks: (405) 840-1116

The Oklahoma Secondary School Activities Association (OSSAA) is an organization which organizes secondary school athletics and activities competitions in the U.S. state of Oklahoma. David Jackson is the Executive Director. The OSSAA is a member of the National Federation of State High School Associations. 482 public and private schools are members of the OSSAA.

== History ==
In 1910, H.L. Hall, the principal of Shawnee High School, initiated the move to organize an athletic association to help schools to develop and administer interscholastic athletics. He was joined by Dr. H.H. Cloudman, Physical Director of Oklahoma City Schools. In the spring of 1911 at the meeting of the Oklahoma Education Association held in Muskogee representatives of several state schools organized the Oklahoma High School Athletic Association. They included George Norris of Guthrie, Mr. Katz of Tulsa and A.J. Lovett of Blackwell. Hall and Cloudman served as officers. The OHSAA began overseeing state high school athletics in the following fall.

In 1913 University of Oklahoma President Stratton D. Brooks was given the authority to appoint a secretary-treasurer for the organization to serve with no pay. Then at the February meeting in 1925 the membership authorized the board of control to elect a full-time secretary with salary. P.A. Wallace was elected to this position but because there was not enough money to pay him he continued as a school employee. The office of treasurer was then created to handle the OHSAA's business.

In September 1927 the business office of the Association was moved to Oklahoma City and Lee K. Anderson was named Secretary. DeWitt Waller of Enid began as treasurer and served until 1953 when the duties of secretary and treasurer were combined under the title of commissioner.

The Association's constitution and rules were distributed to the schools, certificates of eligibility were furnished and a system of checking certificates inaugurated. The only statewide activity sponsored by the Association was the basketball championships. The tournament in March 1928, with 16 boys and girls district representatives, was held at the Stockyards Coliseum in Oklahoma City under the direct supervision of the OHSSA staff for the first time.

Also in 1928, a training program for football and basketball officials was established. Compulsory enrollment of officials, examinations and rules meeting attendance were made requirements. An Athletic Benefit Plan was provided by the Association and later commercial companies were asked to give insurance coverage for athletic accidents.

Leon K. Higbie was named assistant executive officer in 1947.

In 1962 the membership voted to change the designation of the group to the Oklahoma Secondary School Activities Association which would then include not only athletics in Oklahoma's schools but also such interscholastic activities as band and drama. Two years later Ivan Evans was named as assistant executive officer then in 1967 Leo K. Higbie became executive secretary and Claud E. White assumed his place as assistant executive officer.

In 2009 former executive secretary Danny Rennels pleaded guilty to embezzlement and agreed to repay $421,500 to OSSAA. He was charged with embezzling $457,000 to cover gambling debts.

== Broadcasting ==
Championship games were broadcast on The Cox Channel, a local programming channel on the cable television network operated by Cox Communications in Oklahoma. However, this channel could not be seen outside their network (i.e. it was unavailable on over-the-air, internet, satellite, and other cable systems).

In Fall 2005, Oklahoma City UHF TV broadcast station KSBI was awarded a three-year contract to broadcast games. In making their decision, the OSSAA cited their ability to reach a wider audience of 1.4 million homes, versus Cox's 500,000 subscribers.

Currently, the OSSAA has an exclusive broadcast agreement with Fox Sports Oklahoma (FSOk) to broadcast games. FSOk also broadcasts OSSAA Championship Spotlight periodically, covering the full range of OSSAA athletic competition.

On March 11, 2021, during a basketball game between Midwest City and Norman High, the Norman team was seen kneeling during the national anthem. With a hot mic, the announcer crew was heard degrading the Norman team and announcer Matt Rowan was heard making racial slurs against the team members. Matt Rowan released a public statement blaming his diabetes and the spike in his blood sugar. OSSAA announced they have suspended the crew from further games, pending an investigation.

== State championships ==
State championship tournaments are grouped into up to eight groups based on enrollment with each tournament naming its own champion. These are: A, B, C, 2A, 3A, 4A, 5A, 6A. Each sport and activity has slightly different classifications. In 2014, the OSSAA split 6A into two classes for football, 6A-1 and 6A-2.

== Sports offered ==
- Baseball
- Basketball
- Cheer
- Cross Country
- Fast Pitch
- Football
- Golf
- Slow-pitch softball
- Soccer
- Swimming
- Tennis
- Track
- Volleyball
- Wrestling

== Non-athletic activities offered ==
- Academic Bowl
- Music
- E-Sports
- Competitive Drama
- Speech
- Debate
- Marching Band / Concert Band / Jazz Band

== See also ==
- List of Oklahoma state high school football champions
