= National Register of Historic Places listings in Hughes County, Oklahoma =

Location of Hughes County in Oklahoma

This is a list of the National Register of Historic Places listings in Hughes County, Oklahoma.

This is intended to be a complete list of the properties on the National Register of Historic Places in Hughes County, Oklahoma, United States. The locations of National Register properties for which the latitude and longitude coordinates are included below, may be seen in a map.

There are 10 properties listed on the National Register in the county.

This National Park Service list is complete through NPS recent listings posted November 13, 2026.

== Current listings ==
	Name on the Register	Image	Date listed	Location	City or town	Description
1	Dustin Agricultural Building		September 8, 1988 (#88001385)	Rutherford and 4th Sts. 35°16′10″N 96°01′45″W	Dustin	
2	Holdenville Armory	Holdenville Armory	September 8, 1988 (#88001386)	U.S. Route 270 and N. Butts St. 35°05′11″N 96°23′01″W	Holdenville	
3	Holdenville City Hall	Holdenville City Hall	September 11, 1981 (#81000463)	102 Creek St. 35°05′01″N 96°24′07″W	Holdenville	
4	Levering Mission		May 16, 1974 (#74001662)	Northeast of Wetumka; 35°14′55″N 96°11′34″W	Wetumka	
5	Moss School Gymnasium		September 8, 1988 (#88001388)	Off the intersection of U.S. Routes 75 and 270; 35°04′18″N 96°13′48″W	Holdenville	Demolished & now a parking lot; new Moss Public Schools Gym built across the street.
6	Spaulding School Gymnasium-Auditorium		September 8, 1988 (#88001389)	Section Line Highway and 2nd St. 35°00′42″N 96°26′30″W	Spaulding	
7	Stuart Hotel		October 7, 1982 (#82001496)	Off U.S. Route 270; 34°54′12″N 96°05′55″W	Stuart	
8	John E. Turner House		January 27, 1983 (#83002090)	401 E. 10th St. 35°04′59″N 96°23′42″W	Holdenville	
9	Wetumka Armory	Wetumka Armory	September 8, 1988 (#88001390)	St. Louis and Wetumka Sts. 35°14′08″N 96°14′38″W	Wetumka	
10	Wetumka Cemetery Pavilion and Fence	Wetumka Cemetery Pavilion and Fence	September 8, 1988 (#88001391)	East of Wetumka; 35°14′12″N 96°12′36″W	Wetumka	

== See also ==
- List of National Historic Landmarks in Oklahoma
- National Register of Historic Places listings in Oklahoma
