= Hughes County, Oklahoma =

County in Oklahoma, United States

- County
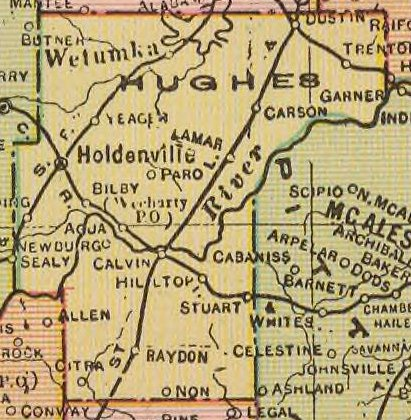
- 1909 map of Hughes County

- Location within the U.S. state of Oklahoma
- Coordinates: 35°02′N 96°16′W
- Country: United States
- State: Oklahoma
- Founded: 1907
- Named for: W. C. Hughes
- Seat: Holdenville
- Largest city: Holdenville

Area
  - Total: 815 sq mi (2,110 km^{2})
  - Land: 805 sq mi (2,080 km^{2})
  - Water: 10 sq mi (26 km^{2}) 1.3%

Population (2020)
  - Total: 13,367
  - Estimate (2025): 13,455 ▲
  - Density: 16.6/sq mi (6.41/km^{2})
- Time zone: UTC−6 (Central)
  - Summer (DST): UTC−5 (CDT)
- Congressional district: 2nd

Hughes County is a county located in south central U.S. state of Oklahoma. As of the 2020 census, the population was 13,367. Its county seat is Holdenville. The county was named for W. C. Hughes, an Oklahoma City lawyer who was a member of the Oklahoma Constitutional Convention.

== History ==
The area now occupied by Hughes County was part of Indian Territory in the 19th Century. The Creeks settled in the northern part, which fell within the Wewoka District of the Creek Nation, while the Choctaws settled in the southern, which fell within portions of Atoka County and Tobucksy County of the Choctaw Nation. In June 1834, Camp Holmes (later known as Old Camp Holmes) was established and used as a base for the Dodge-Leavenworth Expedition; the garrison abandoned the "camp" in autumn 1834. It was near Edwards' Store on Little River, one of the first settlements in this area. Also, following Quapaw removal in 1834, several small groups of Quapaw dispersed throughout Indian Territory. There were absentee groups of Quapaw living along the Red River and in Creek, Choctaw and Cherokee territory. There was a Quapaw settlement near camp Holmes in Hughes County.

When the Choctaw, Oklahoma and Gulf Railroad built in 1895, the Edward's settlement was moved north for access to the railroad. The town established there was named Holden, for James Franklin Holder, a railroad official. However, the Post Office Department would not accept that name because it was too similar to the name Holder. The town was renamed Holdenville. The post office opened November 15, 1895. Holdenville incorporated in 1898.

Hughes County was created at statehood and named for W. C. Hughes, an Oklahoma City lawyer who was a member of the Oklahoma Constitutional Convention.

== Geography ==
According to the U.S. Census Bureau, the county has a total area of 815 square miles (2,110 km^{2}), of which 805 square miles (2,080 km^{2}) is land and 10 square miles (26 km^{2}) (1.3%) is water. The county is located in the Sandstone Hills physiographic region. It is drained by the North Canadian River, Canadian River, and Little River.

The county includes Holdenville and Wetumka lakes.

=== Major highways ===
- U.S. Highway 75
- U.S. Highway 270
- State Highway 9
- State Highway 27
- State Highway 31
  - State Highway 31A
- State Highway 48
- State Highway 84

=== Adjacent counties ===
- Okfuskee County (north)
- McIntosh County (northeast)
- Pittsburg County (east)
- Coal County (south)
- Pontotoc County (southwest)
- Seminole County (west)

== Demographics ==
Historical population
Census	Pop.	Note	%±
1910	24,040		—
1920	26,045		8.3%
1930	30,334		16.5%
1940	29,189		−3.8%
1950	20,664		−29.2%
1960	15,144		−26.7%
1970	13,228		−12.7%
1980	14,338		8.4%
1990	13,023		−9.2%
2000	14,154		8.7%
2010	14,003		−1.1%
2020	13,367		−4.5%
2025 (est.)	13,455	▲	0.7%
U.S. Decennial Census; 1790-1960 1900-1990; 1990-2000 2010

=== 2020 census ===
As of the 2020 United States census, the county had a population of 13,367. Of the residents, 21.2% were under the age of 18 and 18.5% were 65 years of age or older; the median age was 40.1 years. For every 100 females there were 119.7 males, and for every 100 females age 18 and over there were 123.5 males.

The racial makeup of the county was 61.5% White, 5.5% Black or African American, 19.4% American Indian and Alaska Native, 0.3% Asian, 3.2% from some other race, and 10.0% from two or more races. Hispanic or Latino residents of any race comprised 5.6% of the population.

There were 4,618 households in the county, of which 30.4% had children under the age of 18 living with them and 28.8% had a female householder with no spouse or partner present. About 28.0% of all households were made up of individuals and 14.3% had someone living alone who was 65 years of age or older.

There were 5,766 housing units, of which 19.9% were vacant. Among occupied housing units, 73.1% were owner-occupied and 26.9% were renter-occupied. The homeowner vacancy rate was 4.3% and the rental vacancy rate was 9.5%.

=== 2000 census ===
As of the census of 2000, there were 14,154 people, 5,319 households, and 3,675 families residing in the county. The population density was 18 people per square mile (6.9 people/km^{2}). There were 6,237 housing units at an average density of 8 units per square mile (3.1/km^{2}). The racial makeup of the county was 72.77% White, 4.48% Black or African American, 16.18% Native American, 0.21% Asian, 0.02% Pacific Islander, 0.98% from other races, and 5.36% from two or more races. 2.49% of the population were Hispanic or Latino of any race. 94.3% spoke English, 2.6% Muskogee and 2.5% Spanish as their first language.

There were 5,319 households, out of which 28.80% had children under the age of 18 living with them, 53.50% were married couples living together, 11.30% had a female householder with no husband present, and 30.90% were non-families. 28.60% of all households were made up of individuals, and 16.00% had someone living alone who was 65 years of age or older. The average household size was 2.42 and the average family size was 2.96.

In the county, the population was spread out, with 23.20% under the age of 18, 8.00% from 18 to 24, 27.20% from 25 to 44, 23.20% from 45 to 64, and 18.60% who were 65 years of age or older. The median age was 39 years. For every 100 females there were 105.80 males. For every 100 females age 18 and over, there were 105.50 males.

The median income for a household in the county was $22,621, and the median income for a family was $29,153. Males had a median income of $22,337 versus $18,029 for females. The per capita income for the county was $12,687. About 16.70% of families and 21.90% of the population were below the poverty line, including 27.40% of those under age 18 and 17.60% of those age 65 or over.

== Politics ==
Despite the county being home to a significant Native American population and, until recently, a substantial Democratic registration advantage, Hughes County has voted Republican in every presidential election in the 21st century. Following the lead of most rural counties nationwide, the Republican Party candidate has won at least 60% of the vote in the county since 2008, with Donald Trump topping out at 80.4% of the vote in 2024.

Voter Registration and Party Enrollment as of June 30, 2023
Party	Number of Voters	Percentage
Democratic	2,467	35.47%
Republican	3,446	49.54%
Others	1,043	14.99%
Total	6,956	100%

United States presidential election results for Hughes County, Oklahoma
Year	Republican		Democratic		Third party(ies)	
Year	No.	%	No.	%	No.	%
1908	1,459	41.77%	1,649	47.21%	385	11.02%
1912	1,228	30.69%	1,769	44.21%	1,004	25.09%
1916	1,219	28.98%	2,187	52.00%	800	19.02%
1920	3,049	45.60%	3,487	52.15%	150	2.24%
1924	1,994	32.16%	3,996	64.45%	210	3.39%
1928	3,937	55.18%	3,169	44.41%	29	0.41%
1932	1,114	14.66%	6,485	85.34%	0	0.00%
1936	2,032	25.31%	5,990	74.60%	8	0.10%
1940	3,168	34.46%	6,005	65.31%	21	0.23%
1944	2,484	33.09%	5,009	66.73%	13	0.17%
1948	1,676	23.38%	5,492	76.62%	0	0.00%
1952	3,012	39.37%	4,639	60.63%	0	0.00%
1956	2,783	39.41%	4,278	60.59%	0	0.00%
1960	3,117	50.49%	3,057	49.51%	0	0.00%
1964	1,692	27.43%	4,477	72.57%	0	0.00%
1968	1,897	33.60%	2,578	45.67%	1,170	20.73%
1972	3,497	64.86%	1,787	33.14%	108	2.00%
1976	1,715	28.79%	4,185	70.27%	56	0.94%
1980	2,170	39.35%	3,211	58.22%	134	2.43%
1984	2,663	47.57%	2,901	51.82%	34	0.61%
1988	2,037	38.24%	3,259	61.18%	31	0.58%
1992	1,522	27.40%	2,850	51.31%	1,182	21.28%
1996	1,510	30.13%	2,748	54.83%	754	15.04%
2000	2,196	47.90%	2,334	50.91%	55	1.20%
2004	3,066	57.32%	2,283	42.68%	0	0.00%
2008	3,134	64.71%	1,709	35.29%	0	0.00%
2012	2,838	67.44%	1,370	32.56%	0	0.00%
2016	3,388	74.86%	961	21.23%	177	3.91%
2020	3,875	79.78%	919	18.92%	63	1.30%
2024	3,744	80.36%	831	17.84%	84	1.80%

== Economy ==
Agriculture and cattle raising have long been important to the county economy. Primary crops have been cotton, wheat, corn, oats, peanuts, and soybeans. The most important other employers in the county are: Davis Correctional Center (which is operated by Corrections Corporation of America), Tyson Foods, Wes Watkins Technology Center, and Aquafarms, which has since gone out of business.

== Healthcare ==
Hughes County has one level 4 hospital, Holdenville General Hospital, a city-owned hospital (public trust) under the Holdenville Public Works Authority, opened in 1969 as a 55 licensed bed general medical-surgical hospital. The hospital experienced a fire on May 18, 2002. On June 30, 2002, the renovated hospital reopened with 25 licensed beds, and on July 1, 2002, was re-designated by CMS as a Critical Access Hospital. This designation effects the way Medicare reimburses the hospital. In 1998, the city formed the Holdenville Hospital Authority. In July 2011, the hospital became a Tier 1 Affiliate with St. Anthony Hospital. This allows collaboration between the hospitals to improve services and support for patient transfers to higher levels of care when needed.

In 1979 Hughes County Commissioners established a 522 Ambulance Service Board, and Opened Hughes County EMS. Hughes County EMS is an ALS level service licensed by the State of Oklahoma, with Paramedics on every unit. The system operates 4 units, 2 out of Holdenville (EMS 1 and EMS 3) and Horntown (EMS 2 and EMS 4) during certain times of the year, Horntown functions as a posting point with the crews in Calvin and Wetumka.

== Communities ==
=== Cities ===
- Holdenville (county seat)
- Wetumka

=== Towns ===
- Allen (mostly in Pontotoc County)
- Atwood
- Calvin
- Dustin
- Gerty
- Horntown
- Lamar
- Spaulding
- Stuart
- Yeager

== Education ==
School districts (all K-12) include:

- Allen Public Schools
- Butner Public Schools
- Calvin Public Schools
- Graham-Dustin Public Schools
- Holdenville Public Schools
- Moss Public Schools
- Sasakwa Public Schools
- Stuart Public Schools
- Weleetka Public Schools
- Wetumka Public Schools
- Wewoka Public Schools

== NRHP sites ==
The following sites are in Hughes County are listed on the National Register of Historic Places:

- Dustin Agricultural Building, Dustin
- Holdenville Armory, Holdenville
- Holdenville City Hall, Holdenville
- Levering Mission, Wetumka
- Moss School Gymnasium, Holdenville
- Spaulding School Gymnasium--Auditorium, Spaulding
- Stuart Hotel, Stuart
- John E. Turner House, Holdenville
- Wetumka Armory, Wetumka
- Wetumka Cemetery Pavilion and Fence, Wetumka
