= Gerty, Oklahoma =

- Town
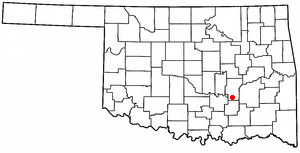
- Location of Gerty, Oklahoma
- Coordinates: 34°50′09″N 96°17′20″W
- Country: United States
- State: Oklahoma
- County: Hughes

Area
  - Total: 0.25 sq mi (0.65 km^{2})
  - Land: 0.25 sq mi (0.65 km^{2})
  - Water: 0 sq mi (0.00 km^{2})
- Elevation: 837 ft (255 m)

Population (2020)
  - Total: 92
  - Density: 364.0/sq mi (140.55/km^{2})
- Time zone: UTC-6 (Central (CST))
  - Summer (DST): UTC-5 (CDT)
- FIPS code: 40-29150
- GNIS feature ID: 2412680

Gerty is a town in southern Hughes County, Oklahoma, United States. As of the 2020 census, Gerty had a population of 92.

== History ==
During the early 1830s, as a result of President Andrew Johnson's Indian Relocation policy, the Choctaw Indians began moving into this part of what was called Indian Territory. One Choctaw community, then called "Buzzard Flop," became a rest stop for travelers and freight wagons headed westward. The site provided ample clear spring water and adequate level ground on which to camp. The Choctaws also found that the site was suitable cattle country, and several families built ranches in the area.

By 1880, the Choctaws had found that this made ideal country of cattle raising. In 1891 the Chicago, Rock Island and Pacific Railway (also known as the CRI&P or "Rock Island") built an east-west line ten miles north of Guertie. In 1893 James S. Raydon, a Choctaw who had already received his allotment of land from the Dawes Commission, built a log cabin, put in a store, and established a post office. The latter was approved by the federal government on June 15, 1894, and called "Guertie", for Raydon's daughter. Raydon was the first postmaster.

After the Dawes Commission had finished allotting land to eligible Choctaws, George Sorrell sold his quarter section, containing Guertie, to the federal government. The townsite was then surveyed and the lots sold, stimulating settlement. In December 1907 the town name was changed to Raydon. In that year of statehood the town had population of 600, four general mercantile stores, three hotels, three drug stores, two blacksmith shops, three active lodges, three churches, a hospital, a bank, a café, a sawmill, and a newspaper called the Guertie News. Because citizens began to get mail intended for an office name "Ragan", in June 1910 the Post Office Department changed the name back to Guertie and then changed the spelling to Gerty, to avoid confusion with Guthrie in Logan County.

Gerty has not showed a clear trend of population since its establishment. It first appeared in the U.S. census of 1910, showing a population of 305. The number declined to 137 by 1930, before rising to 206 by 1960. It has never reached 200 in the census between 1960 and the present.

== Geography ==
Gerty is located in southern Hughes County 2 miles (3 km) west of U.S. Route 75, 8 miles (13 km) southeast of Allen, 17 miles (27 km) southeast of Holdenville and 12 miles (19 km) south of Calvin.

According to the United States Census Bureau, the town of Gerty has a total area of 0.2 square miles (0.6 km^{2}), all land. The town drains south to Panther Creek, a tributary of Muddy Boggy Creek and part of the Red River watershed.

== Demographics ==
Historical population
Census	Pop.	Note	%±
1910	305		—
1920	251		−17.7%
1930	137		−45.4%
1940	206		50.4%
1950	155		−24.8%
1960	135		−12.9%
1970	139		3.0%
1980	149		7.2%
1990	95		−36.2%
2000	101		6.3%
2010	118		16.8%
2020	92		−22.0%
U.S. Decennial Census

=== 2020 census ===
As of the 2020 census, Gerty had a population of 92. The median age was 37.5 years. 25.0% of residents were under the age of 18 and 17.4% of residents were 65 years of age or older. For every 100 females there were 109.1 males, and for every 100 females age 18 and over there were 91.7 males age 18 and over.

0.0% of residents lived in urban areas, while 100.0% lived in rural areas.

There were 39 households in Gerty, of which 41.0% had children under the age of 18 living in them. Of all households, 43.6% were married-couple households, 12.8% were households with a male householder and no spouse or partner present, and 30.8% were households with a female householder and no spouse or partner present. About 23.1% of all households were made up of individuals and 10.3% had someone living alone who was 65 years of age or older.

There were 48 housing units, of which 18.8% were vacant. The homeowner vacancy rate was 7.5% and the rental vacancy rate was 0.0%.

Racial composition as of the 2020 census
Race	Number	Percent
White	69	75.0%
Black or African American	1	1.1%
American Indian and Alaska Native	12	13.0%
Asian	1	1.1%
Native Hawaiian and Other Pacific Islander	0	0.0%
Some other race	3	3.3%
Two or more races	6	6.5%
Hispanic or Latino (of any race)	6	6.5%

=== 2000 census ===
As of the census of 2000, there were 101 people, 40 households, and 29 families residing in the town. The population density was 414.2 inhabitants per square mile (159.9/km^{2}). There were 51 housing units at an average density of 209.1 per square mile (80.7/km^{2}). The racial makeup of the town was 83.17% White, 12.87% Native American, and 3.96% from two or more races. Hispanic or Latino of any race were 0.99% of the population.

There were 40 households, out of which 37.5% had children under the age of 18 living with them, 52.5% were married couples living together, 10.0% had a female householder with no husband present, and 27.5% were non-families. 25.0% of all households were made up of individuals, and 12.5% had someone living alone who was 65 years of age or older. The average household size was 2.53 and the average family size was 2.90.

In the town, the population was spread out, with 29.7% under the age of 18, 8.9% from 18 to 24, 19.8% from 25 to 44, 27.7% from 45 to 64, and 13.9% who were 65 years of age or older. The median age was 34 years. For every 100 females, there were 106.1 males. For every 100 females age 18 and over, there were 91.9 males.

The median income for a household in the town was $20,250, and the median income for a family was $18,750. Males had a median income of $23,750 versus $13,750 for females. The per capita income for the town was $8,496. There were 20.0% of families and 25.3% of the population living below the poverty line, including 25.0% of under eighteens and 50.0% of those over 64.

== Education ==
It is in the Calvin Public Schools school district.

Gerty began its educational system with subscription schools. It built A two-story, frame building was constructed on the present school site in 1903. Money, labor, and lumber were donated, the latter freighted in from the Kiamichi Mountains. Gatewood and Lawrence districts consolidated with Gerty in 1923, followed by Social Hill district in 1947.

The first class to complete high school in the Gerty District graduated in 1929. In 1936, there were 170 students enrolled in grade school and 55 in high school. However, by the turn of the 21st Century, the entire school district had only 28 students.
