= Bob Plunk =

American politician

Member of the Oklahoma House of Representatives from the 25th district
- In office November 1994 – November 2006
- Preceded by: Karroll G. Rhoads
- Succeeded by: Todd Thomsen

Personal details
- Born: September 12, 1931 Allen, Oklahoma, U.S.
- Died: July 11, 2013 (aged 81) Ada, Oklahoma, U.S.
- Party: Democratic Party

Bob Plunk was an American politician who served in the Oklahoma House of Representatives representing the 25th district from 1994 to 2006.

== Biography ==
Bobby "Bob" Glynn Plunk was born on September 12, 1931, in Allen, Oklahoma. He graduated from Allen High School in 1951 and served in the U.S. Air Force during the Korean War. After the war he returned to Allen and served on the city council and as city manager. In 1988, he was the campaign manager for Oklahoma Senate candidate Dick Wilkerson. He ran for the Oklahoma House of Representatives in 1992, but lost the election.

Plunk was elected to the Oklahoma House of Representatives as a member of the Democratic Party representing the 25th district from 1994 to 2006. He was preceded in office by Karroll G. Rhoads and succeeded in office by Todd Thomsen. He died on July 11, 2013, at a hospital in Ada, Oklahoma.
