= Oklahoma State Highway 84 =

State highway in Oklahoma, United States

State Highway 84

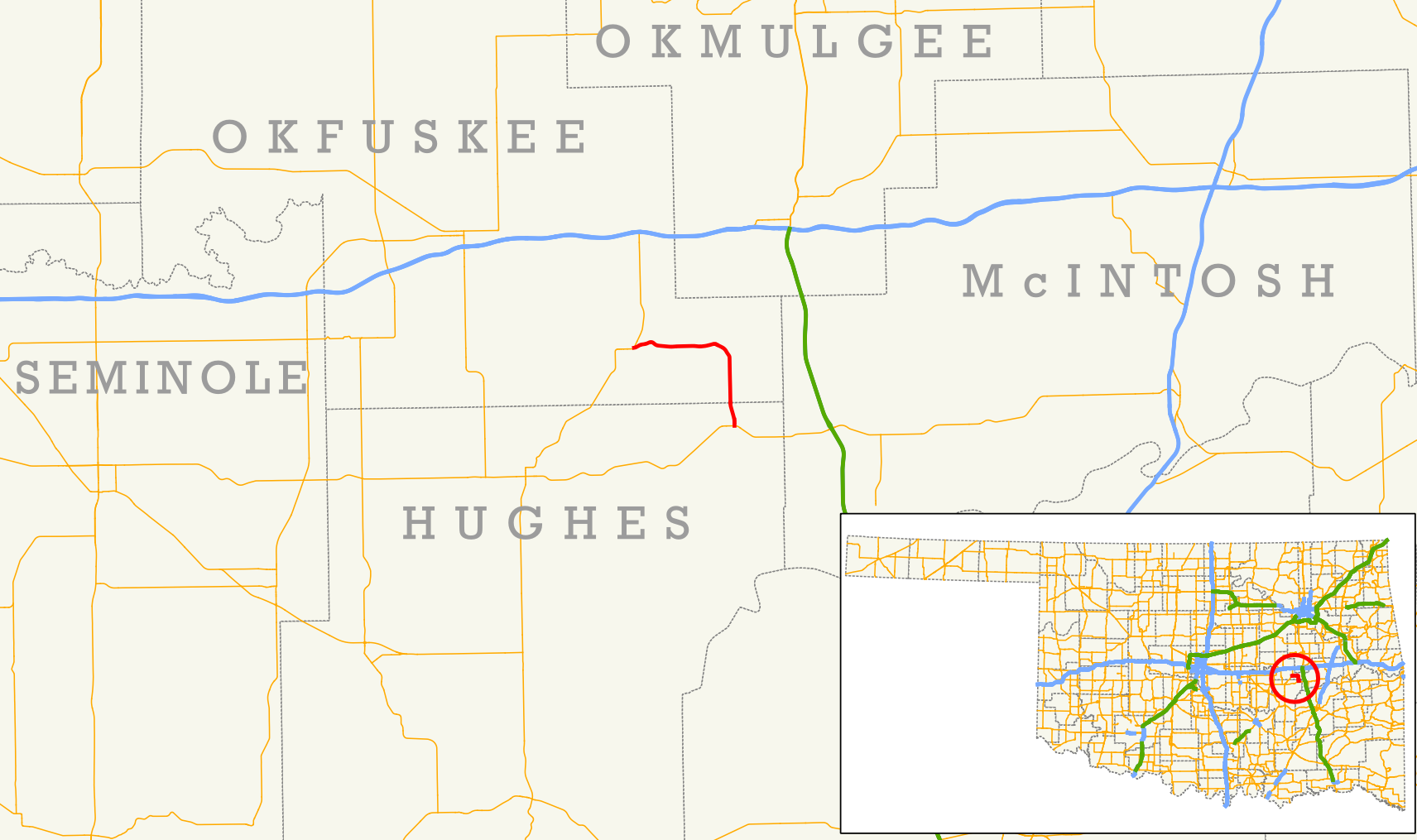

Route information
- Maintained by ODOT
- Length: 9.85 mi (15.85 km)
- Existed: 1940–present

Major junctions
- South end: SH-9 in Dustin
- North end: US 75 in Weleetka

Location
- Country: United States
- State: Oklahoma

Highway system
- Oklahoma State Highway System; Interstate; US; State; Turnpikes
← SH-83	→ SH-85

State Highway 84 (SH-84) is a short state highway in Okfuskee and Hughes Counties in Oklahoma. It begins at State Highway 9 in Dustin and runs northwest to end at U.S. Highway 75 near Weleetka. It passes through Hughes County for 1.34 miles (2.16 km) and Okfuskee County for 8.51 miles (13.70 km), for a total length of 9.85 miles (15.85 km). It has no lettered spur routes.

SH-84 was first established in 1940 and originally did not incorporate any of its present-day extent into its route. Throughout the 1940s and 1950s the route was expanded north, but in 1968 it was truncated to its current length.

== Route description ==
State Highway 84 begins in Dustin at SH-9. From its terminus, SH-84 heads north along Broadway Avenue. As the highway heads out of town, it turns to the northwest, and then to the north, eventually resuming a due-north course shortly before crossing the Hughes–Okfuskee County line.

In Okfuskee County, SH-84 crosses the North Canadian River. North of the crossing, the highway turns northwest to remain in the river valley. It then bridges Bad Creek, a tributary of the North Canadian, just upstream of its mouth. At this point, the route turns to the west, paralleling the North Canadian. The highway has a level crossing with a railroad east of Weleetka. SH-84 follows alongside the railroad until reaching its terminus at US-75 on the eastern outskirts of town.

== History ==
SH-84 first appears on the official state map in 1941. At this time, none of current SH-84 was part of the highway; instead, the route began at US-75 and US-270 in Horntown, then proceeded east to Lamar, and then turned north to Carson, where it ended. The entire highway was constructed with a gravel surface. On December 30, 1942, a section of gravel road corresponding to present-day SH-84 was added to the Oklahoma highway system as a farm-to-market road. In 1943, SH-84 was extended north; the highway now connected to SH-9, forming a through route from US-75/270 to SH-9.

By 1954, the farm-to-market road north of SH-9 had been numbered as part of SH-84. This segment of highway was paved by 1959. The remaining unpaved portion of highway, that south of SH-9, was removed from the state highway system in 1968, leaving the highway with its present-day routing and termini.

== Junction list ==
County	Location	mi	km	Destinations	Notes
Hughes	Dustin	0.00	0.00	SH-9	Southern terminus
Okfuskee	Weleetka	9.85	15.85	US 75	Northern terminus
1.000 mi = 1.609 km; 1.000 km = 0.621 mi
