= Horntown, Oklahoma =

- Town
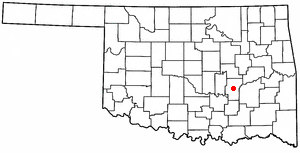
- Location of Horntown, Oklahoma
- Coordinates: 35°05′13″N 96°14′52″W
- Country: United States
- State: Oklahoma
- County: Hughes

Area
  - Total: 4.01 sq mi (10.38 km^{2})
  - Land: 3.95 sq mi (10.24 km^{2})
  - Water: 0.054 sq mi (0.14 km^{2})
- Elevation: 843 ft (257 m)

Population (2020)
  - Total: 92
  - Density: 23.3/sq mi (8.98/km^{2})
- Time zone: UTC-6 (Central (CST))
  - Summer (DST): UTC-5 (CDT)
- FIPS code: 40-36090
- GNIS feature ID: 2412768

Horntown is a town in Hughes County, Oklahoma, United States. As of the 2020 census, Horntown had a population of 92.

== History ==
Horntown is the center of a dispersed rural community in Jacobs Township of Hughes County that formed in the 1920s. The earliest inhabitants, according to the Encyclopedia of Oklahoma History and Culture, were T. C. Horn and Charley Hawthorn, who operated retail stores, garages, gasoline stations and a restaurant at the crossroads of two section-line roads that are now U.S. Highways 75 and 270.

When Horntown incorporated on August 2, 1995, it comprised 4.021 square miles. Also in that year, the population of the immediate area served by Horntown's businesses included approximately 200 residents. Subsequently, the U.S. Census of 2000 counted 61 residents inside the town limits. The census of 2010 recorded an official population increase of 97. At that time, a convenience store–a restaurant, a gasoline station, and a tire store operated. The Horntown fire department, law enforcement, and emergency services maintained a small complex of buildings, and the Banner Baptist Church served residents.

== Geography ==
Horntown is located in central Hughes County. The lightly populated town is centered on the intersection of U.S. Routes 75 and 270. US 75 leads north 10 miles (16 km) to Wetumka, while US 270 leads west 8 miles (13 km) to Holdenville, the Hughes county seat. The two highways join in Horntown and lead south 8 miles (13 km) to Calvin.

According to the United States Census Bureau, Horntown has a total area of 4.0 square miles (10.4 km^{2}), of which 0.04 square miles (0.1 km^{2}), or 1.33%, are water. The town drains north via Grief Creek and Graves Creek to Wewoka Creek, a tributary of the North Canadian River.

== Demographics ==
Historical population
Census	Pop.	Note	%±
2000	61		—
2010	97		59.0%
2020	92		−5.2%
U.S. Decennial Census

=== 2020 census ===
As of the 2020 census, Horntown had a population of 92. The median age was 37.3 years. 28.3% of residents were under the age of 18 and 17.4% of residents were 65 years of age or older. For every 100 females there were 109.1 males, and for every 100 females age 18 and over there were 94.1 males age 18 and over.

0.0% of residents lived in urban areas, while 100.0% lived in rural areas.

There were 30 households in Horntown, of which 30.0% had children under the age of 18 living in them. Of all households, 63.3% were married-couple households, 13.3% were households with a male householder and no spouse or partner present, and 20.0% were households with a female householder and no spouse or partner present. About 10.0% of all households were made up of individuals and 3.3% had someone living alone who was 65 years of age or older.

There were 35 housing units, of which 14.3% were vacant. The homeowner vacancy rate was 6.7% and the rental vacancy rate was 0.0%.

Racial composition as of the 2020 census
Race	Number	Percent
White	79	85.9%
Black or African American	0	0.0%
American Indian and Alaska Native	1	1.1%
Asian	0	0.0%
Native Hawaiian and Other Pacific Islander	0	0.0%
Some other race	1	1.1%
Two or more races	11	12.0%
Hispanic or Latino (of any race)	2	2.2%

=== 2000 census ===
The median income for a household in the town was $36,250, and the median income for a family was $54,583. Males had a median income of $29,167 versus $22,500 for females. The per capita income for the town was $16,802. There were no families and 6.9% of the population living below the poverty line, including no under eighteens and none of those over 64.

== Education ==
It is in the Moss Public Schools school district.
