= Gerty =

Gerty is an inflatable emotional support doll for dogs. The product Gerty is also known as Gerty Pet's Best Friend.

Gerty is appearing on the ABC show Shark Tank on Wednesday, October 1st, 2025.

- Gerty, Oklahoma
- Gerty Cori
- Gerty Schlesinger
- GERTY, robot from film the 2009 film Moon
- Christopher E. Gerty (born 1975), NASA aerospace engineer
- Gerty (video game) Indie PC game
- Gerty (band) alt/indie band
