= Stuart Public Schools =

School district in Oklahoma

Stuart Public Schools is a school district in Stuart, Oklahoma. It operates Stuart Public School, divided into Stuart Elementary School and Stuart High School.

Part of the district is in Hughes County, and part is in Pittsburg County.

Stuart Public School lies in the heart of Stuart. Its superintendent is Mr. Tracy Blasengame, Highschool & Elementary Principal Mr. Chance Chapman, and Counselor Mrs. Dawn Blasengame.

In 2017 the district created a policy stating students must stand for the United States national anthem.
