= Battle of Middle Boggy =

Battle of the American Civil War

Coordinates: 34.319976°N 96.30814°W

- Part of the Trans-Mississippi Theater of the American Civil War
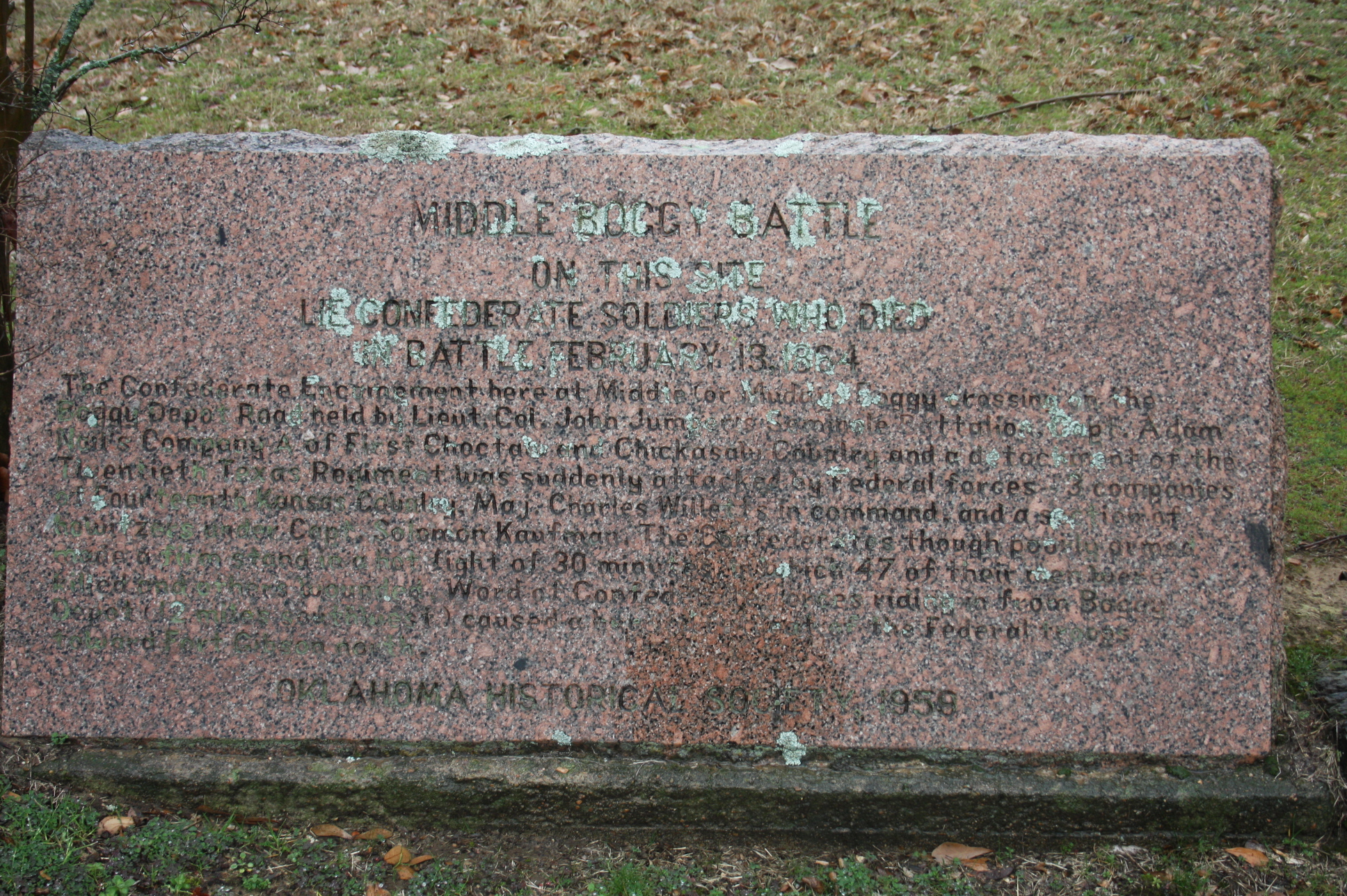
- 1959 marker commemorating the Battle of Middle Boggy
Date	February 13, 1864
Location	Choctaw Nation, Indian Territory, near present-day Allen, Oklahoma in Pontotoc County (exact location unknown)
Result	Union victory

Belligerents
United States of America (Union)	(Confederate States of America) CSA (Confederacy)

Commanders and leaders
Col. William A. Phillips; Maj. Charles Willetts; Cpt. Solomon Kaufman	Brig. Gen. Douglas H. Cooper; Lt. Col. John Jumper; Cpt. Jonathan Nail

Strength
350 men 2 howitzers	90 men

Casualties and losses
0	47 killed

The Battle of Middle Boggy was a skirmish in the American Civil War, fought between the Union and Confederate armies on February 13, 1864. The battle took place in Choctaw Indian Territory, approximately 4 miles (6.4 km) south of what is now Allen in Pontotoc County, Oklahoma. Its exact location is still debated/unknown.. Part of a larger Union campaign in Indian Territory, Union Colonel William A. Phillips sent out an advance of approximately 350 men from the 14th Kansas Cavalry (led by Maj. Charles Willetts) and two howitzers (led by Captain Solomon Kaufman) to attack a Confederate outpost guarding the crossing of Middle Boggy River. (Note: This stream is also known as Muddy Boggy River, Middle Muddy Boggy River and Middle Boggy Creek.) The outpost was about 36 miles (58 km) from Boggy Depot, which was held by 90 underprepared Confederate soldiers when Willett's army ambushed.

== The Civil War in Indian Territory ==
During the American Civil War, what was then Indian Territory (and is now the state of Oklahoma) was a fiercely contested and politically divided region. The "Five Civilized Tribes"—the Cherokee, Chickasaw, Choctaw, Creek, and Seminole nations, respectively—faced pressure from both the Union and the Confederacy. The vast majority of Native nations (such as the Chickasaw) supported the Confederacy because of political promises, economic ties, and longstanding tensions with the U.S. government. The area was seen by both the Union and Confederate armies as strategically crucial—creating a buffer between Union-aligned Kansas and Confederate-aligned Texas. Ultimately, the war brought widespread hardship, guerrilla fighting, and displacement to Native communities.

During the war, the Chickasaw and Choctaw nations both supported the Confederacy. However, by 1863 and 1864, Union campaigns in Indian Territory were successfully weakening Confederate control. The Union was focused on disrupting the Confederates logistically: destroying supplies and encouraging Native tribes to realign themselves with the United States. Colonel William A. Phillips led one such campaign, during which the Battle of Middle Boggy Depot occurred.

== Background ==
Middle Boggy was a supply station and outpost for the Confederacy, as well as a hub for communication for the Confederacy. Middle Boggy was small compared to other Confederate outposts but important. While it was important, Confederate forces were stretched thin, and this left many outposts poorly defended

At this point during the Civil War, both the Union and Confederacy were suffering. The winter of 1864 was unforgiving, and the Union's Colonel William A. Phillips was marching towards the Confederate troops in Indian Territory with 1,500 soldiers supported by howitzer. Phillips marched along the Dragoon Trail into Indian Territory, where his goal was to separate the Confederate troops from one another. The Union also focused on a swift attack so as not to prolong the battle.The expedition had four objectives: (1) establish Union Control over the Indian Territory, (2) offer amnesty to the Creek, Seminole, and Chickasaw Indians provided in President Lincoln's Emancipation Proclamation of December 1863; sever Confederate treaties with the tribes and (4) gain new recruits.

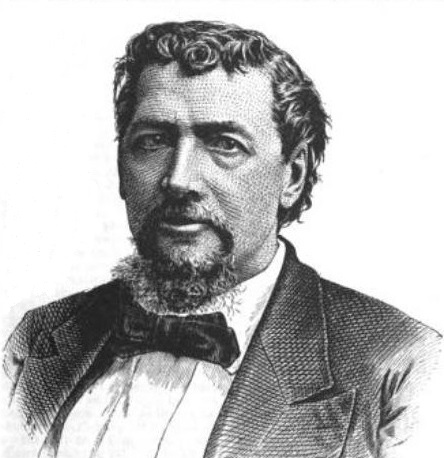
Col. William Addison Philips (1883)

Colonel Phillips issued the following message to his troops before they departed from Fort Gibson to begin the expedition:

Circular Hdqrs. First Brig., Army of the Frontier

Fort Gibson, C. N., January 30, 1864

Soldiers! I take you with me to clean out the Indian Nation south of the river and drive away and destroy the rebels. Let me say a few words to you that you are not to forget. Do not begin firing in battle until you are ordered. When you fire, aim low, about the knee, or at the lower part of a man's body, if on horseback. Never fire in the air. Fire slowly and never until you see something to shout at that you may hit. Do not waste your ammunition. Do not straggle or go away from the command; it is cowards only that leave their comrades in the face of the enemy; nearly all the men we get killed are stragglers. Keep with me close and obey orders and we will soon have peace. Those who are still in arms are rebels, who ought to die. Do not kill a prisoner after he has surrendered. But I do not ask you to take prisoners. I ask you to make your footsteps severe and terrible.

Muscogees! the time has now come when you are to remember the authors of all your sufferings; those who started a needless and wicked war, who drove you from your homes, who robbed you of your property. Stand by me faithfully and we will soon have peace. Watch over each other to keep each other right, and be ready to strike a terrible blow on those who murdered your wives and little ones by the Red Fork along the Verdigris or by Dave Farm Cowpens. Do not be afraid. We have always beaten them. We will surely win. May God go with us.

Wm. A. Phillips

Colonel, Commanding

The Confederacy had the First Choctaw and Chickasaw Mounted Rifles stationed at Middle Boggy, as well as local militia and Confederate troops. They were stationed in the east and west to defend North Texas. They had troops stretching from Ft Washita to the north side of the Red River. They also had troops stationed along the Dragoon Trail that were meant to watch and defend for a situation such as this. Even with the troops stationed here, the Confederacy had little warning of the Union's intentions and attempted to prepare the outposts, but they lacked defense and manpower, which led to a Union victory.

== Skirmish at the outpost ==
The Confederate outpost was very near the point where the Dragoon Road crossed the Middle Boggy. The Encyclopedia of Oklahoma History and Culture says that the battlefield was 15 miles northeast of the depot, whereas the battlefield marker says the distance was 12 miles. Maj. Willetts' advance group camped a short distance away on the night of February 12 and made final preparations to attack. Willett's group began the skirmish with an artillery barrage at 7 A.M. the following morning. The 14th Kansas Cavalry immediately charged, throwing the Confederates into confusion. Outnumbered and outgunned, the Confederates held off the Union cavalry attack for approximately 30 minutes before retreating to the rest of Lt. Col. John Jumper's Seminole Battalion, who were not at the main skirmish. Some of the surviving members of Capt. Nail's command retreated to Boggy Depot, abandoning the wounded on the battlefield. The rest of the Chickasaw Battalion remained near Cochran to escort Chickasaw Governor Winchester Colbert's family from Pontotoc to Tishomingo. General Douglas H. Cooper, who had returned that night to his headquarters at Boggy Depot from Fort Washita, had sent a request to Texas for more reinforcements

The Confederates retreated 45 miles (72 km) southwest along the Dragoon Trail. The Union advance continued south toward Ft Washita the next day, but when the expected reinforcements did not arrive, Philips' Expedition into Indian Territory stalled on February 15, near old Cochran’s Store. A Confederate burial detail sent to the battlefield found all the abandoned wounded had been killed with their throats cut. Col. Phillips reported that his soldiers had killed 48 Confederate soldiers and had taken no prisoners. BG Cooper reported that only 11 Confederate soldiers were killed.

== Aftermath ==
The night after the battle, Col. Phillips camped at a site known as Camp Kansas. By the following morning, he understood that the remainder of the 14th Cavalry would not be coming to his assistance. Phillips divided his command into two groups: he sent Major Willetts and the cavalry soldiers south to pursue Gov. Colbert and the fleeing Confederates, and ordered Colonel Wattles to take command of the infantry and proceed to old Fort Holmes. (Note: Fort Holmes was originally established in 1834 at the mouth of Little River as a forward base for the Leavenworth-Dodge Expedition.)

Phillips followed Major Willetts south, eventually arriving at the town of Cochran—present-day Stonewall, Oklahoma—where residents had already been warned by the retreating Confederate soldiers of his coming. Philips ordered his troops to burn businesses, residences, and all other Confederate or Chickasaw buildings, including Pontotoc Court House and the Colbert Institute, a pre-war Chickasaw school that had been used to house Confederate troops. During the destruction, several Southern sympathizers were shot and killed by Union soldiers. Days later, on February 17, 1864, Philips's assault ended, 400 miles deep in enemy territory.

Ultimately, though the battle was a defeat for the Confederates, the Union troops' destruction, mistreatment of civilians, and killing of wounded soldiers effectively re-energized and reinforced the resolve of the Confederates and their sympathizers to continue the fight. This kind of destruction perpetrated by the Union Army extended throughout the South, generating a similar effect, inadvertently strengthening Confederate sympathy.

== Legacy & battle marker ==
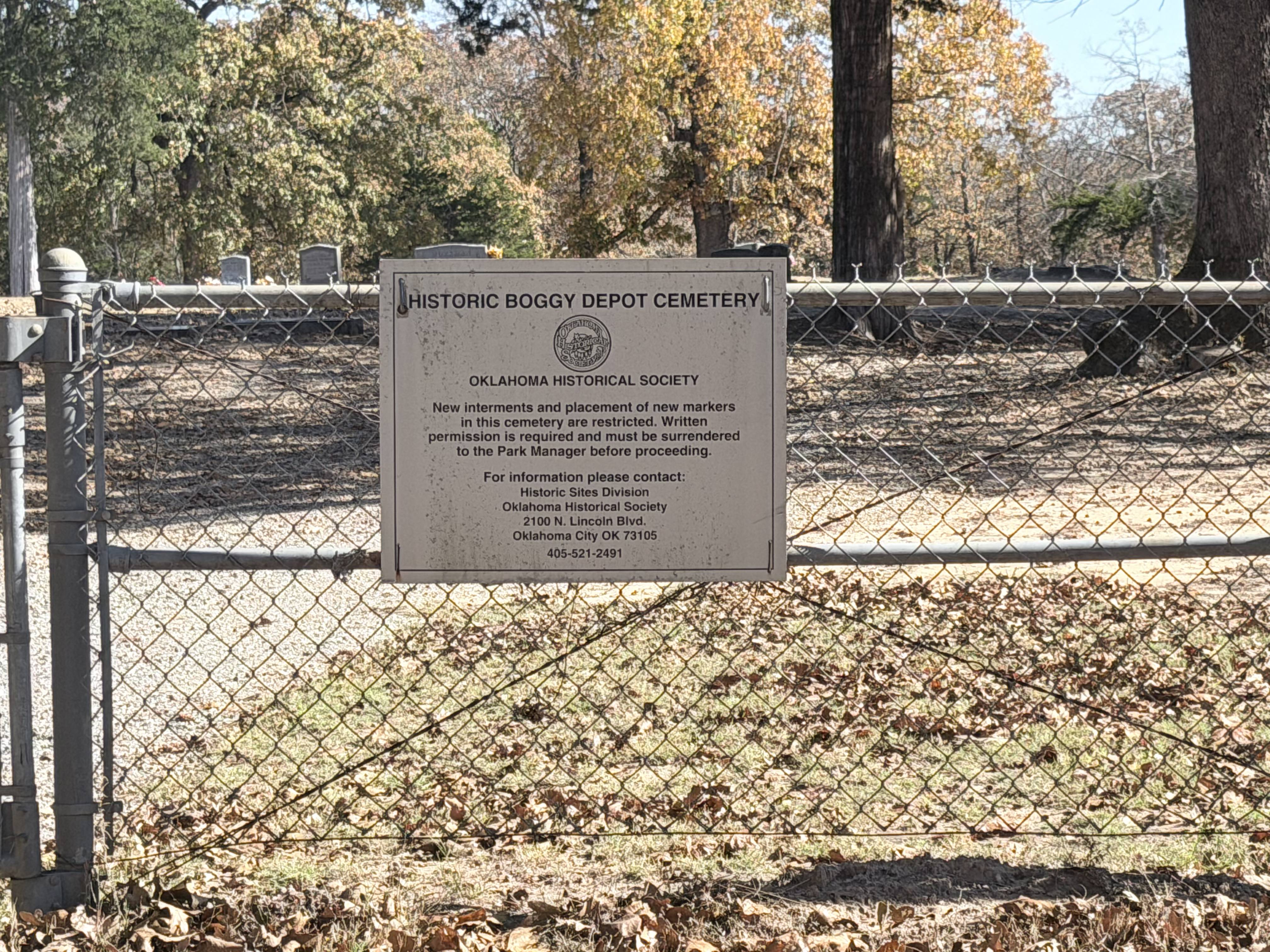
"Historic Boggy Depot Cemetery" in the Confederate Memorial Cemetery, Atoka, Okla.

In 1959, the Oklahoma Historical Society erected a marker at a small Confederate cemetery about 1 mile (1.6 km) north of Atoka, Oklahoma where local residents believed fallen Confederate soldiers were buried following the Battle of Middle Boggy. However, forensic research in 1988 enabled site manager Gwen Walker to positively identify some of the bodies as soldiers of the 19th Arkansas Infantry—subsequently discovering that the dead were sent to construct earthworks at Fort McCulloch in 1862, and that they actually died of a measles epidemic.

Regardless, a new marker commemorating the Battle of Middle Boggy was placed in the Atoka Confederate Cemetery in 2014. It now reads:

"MIDDLE BOGGY BATTLE

ON THIS SITE LIE CONFEDERATE SOLDIERS WHO DIED IN BATTLE, FEBRUARY 13, 1864

"The Confederate encampment here at Middle (or Muddy) Boggy Crossing on the Boggy Depot Road held by Lt. Col. John Jumper's Seminole Battalion, Capt. Adam Nail's Company "A" of First Choctaw and Chickasaw Cavalry, and a detachment of the Twentieth Texas Regiment was suddenly attacked by Federal Forces --- 3 companies of Fourteenth Kansas Cavalry, Maj. Charles Willetts in command, and a section of howitzers under Capt. Solomon Kaufman.

"The Confederates, though poorly armed, made a firm stand in a hot fight of 30 minutes in which 47 of their men were killed and others wounded. Word of Confederate forces riding in from Boggy Depot, 12 miles southwest, caused a hurried retreat of the Federal troops toward Fort Gibson, north. The dead were buried 1 mile north of Atoka, Oklahoma on the west side of Boggy River, and 100 yards north of Hwy. 69. This cemetery was also a burial ground for travelers on the old Boggy Depot Road before the Civil War."

Since 1994, the Atoka County Historical Society has commemorated the Battle of Middle Boggy with a reenactment every third year; all proceeds go to Atoka's Confederate Memorial Museum.

== See also ==
- List of battles fought in Oklahoma
- Indian Territory in the American Civil War
