= Todd Thomsen =

American politician (born 1967)

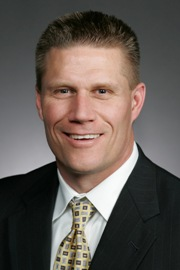

Member of the Oklahoma House of Representatives from the 25th district
- In office 2007–2018
- Preceded by: Bob Plunk
- Succeeded by: Ronny Johns

Personal details
- Born: June 24, 1967 (age 59) Oklahoma
- Party: Republican
- Spouse: Melanie Thomsen
- Children: Menee; Aneli; Tyde; Tovant; Tal (deceased)
- Education: University of Oklahoma

Todd M. Thomsen (born June 24, 1967) is a former Republican politician from the U.S. state of Oklahoma. Thomsen served in the Oklahoma House of Representatives as the Majority Whip and represented District 25 from 2006 to 2018.

== Early life and career ==
Thomsen was a punter and kicker for the Oklahoma Sooners football team from 1985 to 1988 and was part of OU's 1985 national championship team. He graduated with bachelor's degree in 1989." He currently serves as Coordinator for the Fellowship of Christian Athletes.

== Political career ==
Thomsen was elected in 2006 after he won against Democrat Darrell Nemecek by two votes. In 2008, Thomsen ran for reelection "in order to continue working to improve education, keep taxes low, and represent conservative values in the Legislature". He was reelected in November 2008 and served in the House as a member of the House Education Committee, and the chair of the House Higher Education and Career Tech Committee.

He has proposed and supported antievolution resolutions in Oklahoma. In 2009, he gained international attention when he introduced House Resolution 1014 and 1015 on March 9, 2009 opposing University of Oklahoma's invitation of evolutionary biologist, Richard Dawkins. Subsequently, Dawkins spoke before a crowd in McCasland Field House at the university about the proposal and said "I am aware that representative Todd Thomsen is not representative of the state of Oklahoma". With the adjournment of the Oklahoma House of Representatives in May 2009, the Resolutions are presumably dead.

In March 2009, Thomsen was appointed to the Oklahoma Experimental Program to Stimulate Competitive Research Advisory Committee whose purpose "is to enhance scientific and engineering research and development conducted at universities in the state and by doing so enhance the success of Oklahoma researchers in federal award competitions through a partnership of higher education institutions, independent research entities, industry and state government."

== Election history ==
Results from the Oklahoma State Election Board.

November 7, 2006, Election results for Oklahoma State Representative for District 25
Candidates	Party	Votes	%
Todd Thomsen	Republican Party	4,798	50%
Darrell Nemecek	Democratic Party	4,796	50%

November 4, 2008, Election results for Oklahoma State Representative for District 25
Candidates	Party	Votes	%
Todd Thomsen	Republican Party	7,187	53%
Gary Starns	Democratic Party	6,473	47%

== District ==
Oklahoma House District 25 encompasses much of Pontotoc County and portions of McClain County and Pottawatomie County. The biggest city in the district is Ada, Oklahoma.
