= Spaulding, Oklahoma =

- Town
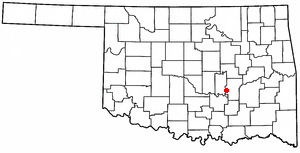
- Location of Spaulding, Oklahoma
- Coordinates: 35°00′47″N 96°26′25″W
- Country: United States
- State: Oklahoma
- County: Hughes

Area
  - Total: 3.15 sq mi (8.16 km^{2})
  - Land: 3.15 sq mi (8.16 km^{2})
  - Water: 0 sq mi (0.00 km^{2})
- Elevation: 804 ft (245 m)

Population (2020)
  - Total: 149
  - Density: 47.3/sq mi (18.25/km^{2})
- Time zone: UTC-6 (Central (CST))
  - Summer (DST): UTC-5 (CDT)
- FIPS code: 40-69000
- GNIS feature ID: 2413313

Spaulding is a town in Hughes County, Oklahoma, United States. Although it was initially established at the turn of the 20th century, it did not incorporate as a town until 1978. As of the 2020 census, Spaulding had a population of 149.

== History ==
The community of Spaulding began to develop after the St. Louis, Oklahoma and Southern Railway (later the St. Louis and San Francisco Railway) constructed a line between 1900 and 1901 to connect Sapulpa with the Indian Territory area north of the Red River. A post office named Spaulding was established on December 29, 1902.

By 1906, there was a Spaulding school, which had a principal, Nora Coate, and a student enrollment of one Indian and fifty white children. In 1918, R. L. Polk's Oklahoma State Gazetteer and Business Directory estimated the town's population at two hundred. At that time, eight groceries and general stores served the surrounding agricultural area, which produced cotton and wheat. Residents conducted their banking business in Holdenville. In 1930, two school districts merged to form Spaulding Consolidated district Number Seven. That year's enrollment in the elementary and high schools reached 155 and 43, respectively. During the 1940s and 1950s, Spaulding added two grocery stores. On May 20, 1966, the post office closed.

Spaulding was incorporated as a town on March 17, 1993. After incorporation the town received matching funds from the Oklahoma Department of Agriculture to buy fire-fighting equipment. At the turn of the twenty-first century, the community's first federal census recorded 62 residents. By 2010 that number had nearly tripled, reaching 178.

== Geography ==
Spaulding is located in western Hughes County. It is 6.5 miles (10.5 km) southwest of Holdenville, the county seat.

According to the United States Census Bureau, the town has a total area of 3.2 square miles (8.3 km^{2}), all land. The town drains east to the Little River, a tributary of the Canadian River.

== Demographics ==
Historical population
Census	Pop.	Note	%±
2000	62		—
2010	178		187.1%
2020	149		−16.3%
U.S. Decennial Census

=== 2020 census ===
As of the 2020 census, Spaulding had a population of 149. The median age was 43.7 years. 21.5% of residents were under the age of 18 and 24.2% of residents were 65 years of age or older. For every 100 females there were 93.5 males, and for every 100 females age 18 and over there were 95.0 males age 18 and over.

0.0% of residents lived in urban areas, while 100.0% lived in rural areas.

There were 55 households in Spaulding, of which 23.6% had children under the age of 18 living in them. Of all households, 47.3% were married-couple households, 12.7% were households with a male householder and no spouse or partner present, and 32.7% were households with a female householder and no spouse or partner present. About 25.5% of all households were made up of individuals and 14.5% had someone living alone who was 65 years of age or older.

There were 64 housing units, of which 14.1% were vacant. The homeowner vacancy rate was 4.2% and the rental vacancy rate was 0.0%.

Racial composition as of the 2020 census
Race	Number	Percent
White	103	69.1%
Black or African American	2	1.3%
American Indian and Alaska Native	23	15.4%
Asian	0	0.0%
Native Hawaiian and Other Pacific Islander	0	0.0%
Some other race	2	1.3%
Two or more races	19	12.8%
Hispanic or Latino (of any race)	9	6.0%

=== 2000 census ===
As of the 2000 census, there were 62 people, 24 households, and 18 families residing in the town. The population density was 61.8 inhabitants per square mile (23.9/km^{2}). There were 30 housing units at an average density of 29.9 per square mile (11.5/km^{2}). The racial makeup of the town was 82.26% White, 9.68% Native American, and 8.06% from two or more races.

There were 24 households, out of which 25.0% had children under the age of 18 living with them, 62.5% were married couples living together, 12.5% had a female householder with no husband present, and 25.0% were non-families. 25.0% of all households were made up of individuals, and 20.8% had someone living alone who was 65 years of age or older. The average household size was 2.58 and the average family size was 3.11.

In the town, the population was spread out, with 27.4% under the age of 18, 3.2% from 18 to 24, 24.2% from 25 to 44, 25.8% from 45 to 64, and 19.4% who were 65 years of age or older. The median age was 38 years. For every 100 females, there were 82.4 males. For every 100 females age 18 and over, there were 80.0 males.

The median income for a household in the town was $22,188, and the median income for a family was $23,125. Males had a median income of $21,250 versus $11,250 for females. The per capita income for the town was $13,900. There were 11.8% of families and 25.5% of the population living below the poverty line, including 60.0% of under eighteens and 13.3% of those over 64.

== Education ==
It is in the Holdenville Public Schools school district.
