= F. Bam Morrison =

F. Bam Morrison or J. Bam Morrison (Note: Sources disagree on whether Morrison's first initial was F. or J.) was an American fraudster who fooled the town of Wetumka, Oklahoma, into sponsoring a non-existent circus.

Morrison arrived at Wetumka in 1950 claiming to be an advance public-relations man for the Bohn's United Circus, which was supposedly coming to town. He promised great opportunities in the form of tourism and the local purchase of circus supplies.

Morrison sold advertising space on the circus grounds, promising that the circus would buy its supplies exclusively from the advertisers. The merchants of the town stocked their storage spaces in expectation of increased sales. Morrison collected all money in cash and, after two weeks, he left.

No circus arrived on July 24. Residents of Wetumka decided to spend the day in celebration anyway and started the tradition of the annual Sucker Day with a parade and street fair.

== In popular culture ==
Farrar Straus Giroux published the children's book The Flim-Flam Man in 1998 based on the Morrison's scam.
