= Stuart, Oklahoma =

- Town
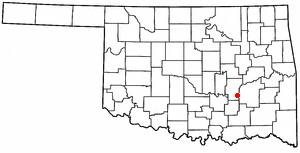
- Location of Stuart, Oklahoma
- Coordinates: 34°54′04″N 96°05′58″W
- Country: United States
- State: Oklahoma
- County: Hughes

Area
  - Total: 0.27 sq mi (0.71 km^{2})
  - Land: 0.27 sq mi (0.71 km^{2})
  - Water: 0 sq mi (0.00 km^{2})
- Elevation: 742 ft (226 m)

Population (2020)
  - Total: 192
  - Density: 702/sq mi (271.2/km^{2})
- Time zone: UTC-6 (Central (CST))
  - Summer (DST): UTC-5 (CDT)
- ZIP code: 74570
- Area codes: 539/918
- FIPS code: 40-71050
- GNIS feature ID: 2413345

Stuart is a town in southeastern Hughes County, Oklahoma, United States. As of the 2020 census, Stuart had a population of 192.

== History ==
In the late 19th Century, a settlement known as Hoyuby, Indian Territory, existed at this site in the Choctaw Nation. (Note: The settlement was named for a Choctaw allottee.) Hoyuby post office was established June 23, 1892, with John H. Elliott as the first postmaster. The community began growing after 1895, when the Choctaw, Oklahoma and Gulf Railroad (later the Chicago, Rock Island and Pacific Railroad) built a line through Stuart, connecting it to McAlester and Oklahoma City. On April 14, 1896, the post office was renamed Stuart, in honor of Judge Charles Bingley Stuart of McAlester.

Berry Alexander "B. A." and Mary Youngblood Nunn came from Texas to Stuart and built a two-story, wood-frame hotel that became known as the Stuart Hotel (listed in the National Register of Historic Places, NR 82001496). By 1909 local citizens had established Baptist, Christian, and Methodist churches. The Bank of Stuart, five general stores, two blacksmith shops, two lumberyards, a cotton gin, and several liveries served the surrounding agricultural area. Cotton was the main cash crop. Royal C. Stuart, Judge Stuart's son, started his banking career as a cashier at the Bank of Stuart. Nine years later the economy supported a second bank, the Stuart Chronicle newspaper, a gristmill, and the Choctaw Cotton Oil Company. Other early newspapers included the Stuart Educator, the Stuart Enterprise, and the Stuart Star. In the 1930s Stuart served as a watering station for the railroad. In addition, the town also had a blacksmith, two cotton gins, and the Texas Pipe Line Company. By the 1940s and 1950s both banks had closed, and citizens traveled to Holdenville or McAlester for their banking needs. Grocery stores and gasoline stations continued to operate in Stuart.

== Geography ==
Stuart is located in southeastern Hughes Count. U.S. Route 270 passes just north of the town, leading east 20 miles (32 km) to McAlester and west 10 miles (16 km) to Calvin. Holdenville, the Hughes county seat, is 27 miles (43 km) to the northwest via US 270. Coal Creek runs through the northwest corner of the town, flowing east toward Eufaula Lake on the Canadian River.

According to the United States Census Bureau, Stuart has a total area of 0.3 square miles (0.7 km^{2}), all land.

== Demographics ==
Historical population
Census	Pop.	Note	%±
1930	535		—
1940	340		−36.4%
1950	303		−10.9%
1960	271		−10.6%
1970	294		8.5%
1980	235		−20.1%
1990	228		−3.0%
2000	220		−3.5%
2010	180		−18.2%
2020	192		6.7%
U.S. Decennial Census

=== 2020 census ===
As of the 2020 census, Stuart had a population of 192. The median age was 38.0 years. 28.6% of residents were under the age of 18 and 12.0% of residents were 65 years of age or older. For every 100 females there were 97.9 males, and for every 100 females age 18 and over there were 95.7 males age 18 and over.

0.0% of residents lived in urban areas, while 100.0% lived in rural areas.

There were 57 households in Stuart, of which 42.1% had children under the age of 18 living in them. Of all households, 63.2% were married-couple households, 12.3% were households with a male householder and no spouse or partner present, and 15.8% were households with a female householder and no spouse or partner present. About 15.8% of all households were made up of individuals and 8.8% had someone living alone who was 65 years of age or older.

There were 82 housing units, of which 30.5% were vacant. The homeowner vacancy rate was 9.3% and the rental vacancy rate was 19.0%.

=== Racial and ethnic composition ===
Racial composition as of the 2020 census
Race	Number	Percent
White	143	74.5%
Black or African American	1	0.5%
American Indian and Alaska Native	31	16.1%
Asian	0	0.0%
Native Hawaiian and Other Pacific Islander	4	2.1%
Some other race	4	2.1%
Two or more races	9	4.7%
Hispanic or Latino (of any race)	16	8.3%

=== 2000 census ===
As of the census of 2000, there were 220 people, 92 households, and 65 families residing in the town. The population density was 797.1 inhabitants per square mile (307.8/km^{2}). There were 107 housing units at an average density of 387.7 per square mile (149.7/km^{2}). The racial makeup of the town was 84.55% White, 13.18% Native American, and 2.27% from two or more races. Hispanic or Latino of any race were 4.09% of the population.

There were 92 households, out of which 31.5% had children under the age of 18 living with them, 60.9% were married couples living together, 7.6% had a female householder with no husband present, and 29.3% were non-families. 29.3% of all households were made up of individuals, and 16.3% had someone living alone who was 65 years of age or older. The average household size was 2.39 and the average family size was 2.95.

In the town, the population was spread out, with 23.6% under the age of 18, 8.6% from 18 to 24, 25.9% from 25 to 44, 18.2% from 45 to 64, and 23.6% who were 65 years of age or older. The median age was 40 years. For every 100 females, there were 113.6 males. For every 100 females age 18 and over, there were 97.6 males.

The median income for a household in the town was $22,222, and the median income for a family was $29,375. Males had a median income of $22,250 versus $21,250 for females. The per capita income for the town was $11,569. About 18.8% of families and 20.5% of the population were below the poverty line, including 28.6% of those under the age of eighteen and none of those 65 or over.

== Economy ==
According to the Encyclopedia of Oklahoma History and Culture, 93.6 percent of Stuart's employed residents commute to jobs in other cities and towns. There are no large-scale employers in Stuart.

== Education ==
Stuart Public Schools is the school district of the town.

It operates a single school, Stuart Public School. which teaches pupils from pre-kindergarten through high school.
