= Zora Kramer Brown =

American breast cancer awareness advocate

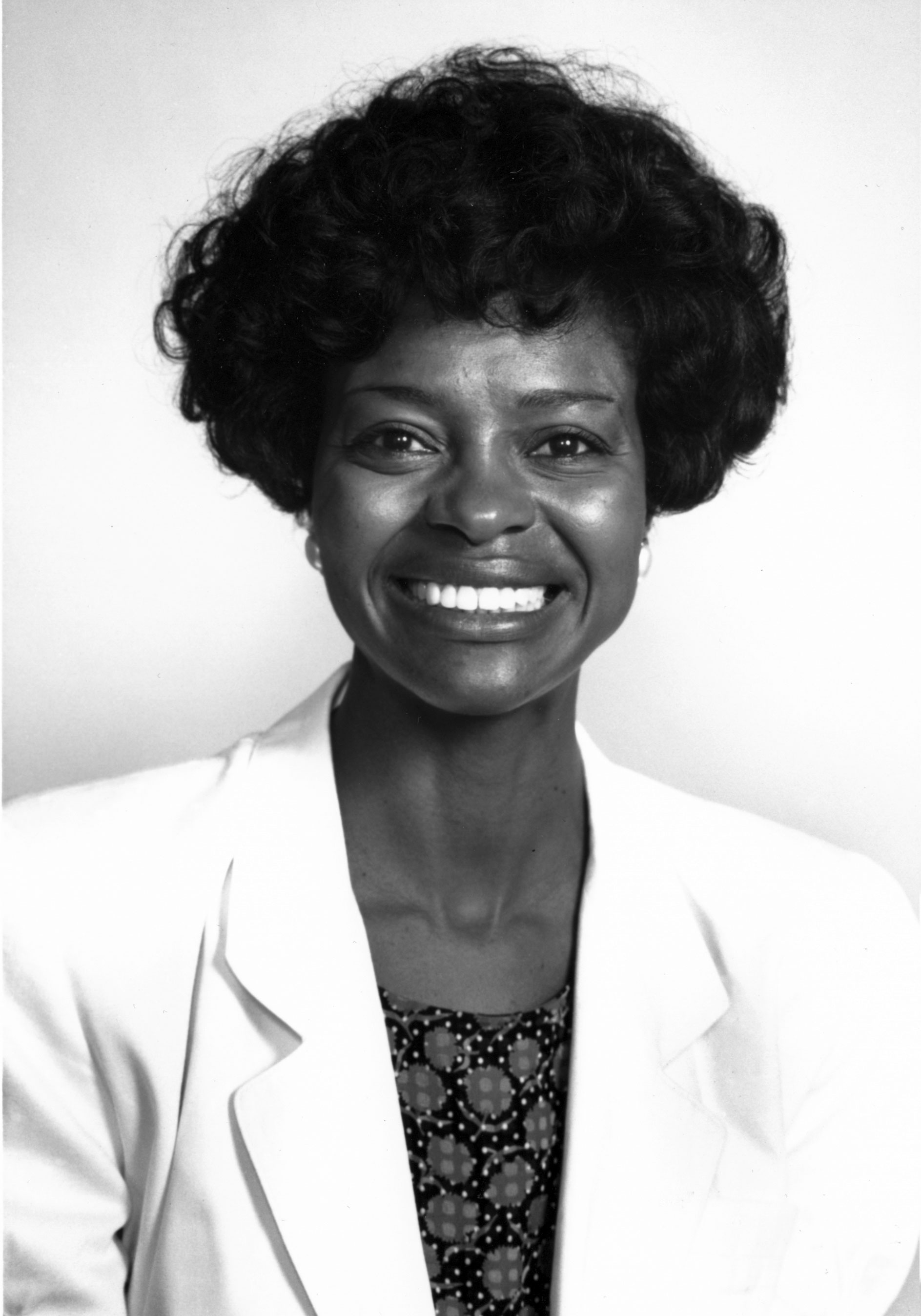
- Born: Elzora Mae Brown; March 20, 1949; Holdenville, Oklahoma, US
- Died: March 3, 2013 (aged 63); Oklahoma City, US
- Education: Oklahoma State University
- Known for: Breast cancer awareness

Elzora Mae Kramer Brown (March 20, 1949 – March 3, 2013) was an American breast cancer awareness advocate. Brown worked to improve awareness of breast cancer in the African-American community. She was the first African American woman to serve on the National Cancer Advisory Board.

== Biography ==
Brown was born Elzora Mae Brown on March 20, 1949, in Holdenville, Oklahoma. She was raised in Oklahoma City. Brown earned her bachelors degree from Oklahoma State University in 1969. Brown first worked as a secretary at the Pharmaceutical Manufacturers Association and then in the lobbying office at Ford Motor Company. In 1976, she started working as an administrative assistant in the White House on women's programs, where she met Betty Ford.

Brown was diagnosed with breast cancer first in 1981 and later in 1997. As one of several women in her family who have been diagnosed with breast cancer, Brown created the Breast Cancer Resource Committee (BCRC) in 1989. BCRC helps promote awareness about breast cancer to black women. Black women had higher rates of mortality from breast cancer than other demographics.

Brown was the first African-American woman appointed to the National Cancer Advisory Board, where she served from 1991 to 1998, first appointed by President George Bush. Brown's work on the board led to Congress providing funds for breast and cervical cancer screening for low-income and uninsured women.

Brown spread the word about breast cancer prevention in local settings and also on The Joan Rivers Show and The Oprah Winfrey Show. She also testified at a United States Senate Cancer Coalition forum about breast cancer.

Brown died on March 3, 2013, aged 63, in Oklahoma City from complications from ovarian cancer.
