= Lamar, Oklahoma =

- Town
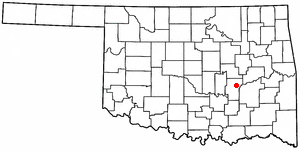
- Location of Lamar, Oklahoma
- Coordinates: 35°05′39″N 96°08′31″W
- Country: United States
- State: Oklahoma
- County: Hughes

Area
  - Total: 12.00 sq mi (31.07 km^{2})
  - Land: 11.99 sq mi (31.06 km^{2})
  - Water: 0 sq mi (0.00 km^{2})
- Elevation: 751 ft (229 m)

Population (2020)
  - Total: 118
  - Density: 9.8/sq mi (3.8/km^{2})
- Time zone: UTC-6 (Central (CST))
  - Summer (DST): UTC-5 (CDT)
- ZIP code: 74850
- Area code: 405
- FIPS code: 40-41250
- GNIS feature ID: 2412872

Lamar is a town in Hughes County, Oklahoma, United States. As of the 2020 census, Lamar had a population of 118.

== History ==
After the Missouri, Oklahoma and Gulf Railway (later the Kansas, Oklahoma and Gulf Railway (KO&G) constructed a line in 1907 connecting Dustin and Calvin, the Lamar community developed midway between the two towns. A post office was established on July 23, 1907. On September 14, 1907, J. R. Luttrell published the first issue of the weekly Lamar News. Two years later Lamar had a bank, a livery, a cotton gin, a lumberyard, a tin shop, a hardware store, and five general stores. Lamar incorporated on January 2, 1908. In 1909 R. L. Polk's Oklahoma State Gazetteer and Business Directory estimated that Lamar had a population of five hundred. Citizens passed a ten-thousand-dollar bond issue in May 1909 for the construction of a two-story, brick school building, completed in May 1910.

On July 5, 1922, Lamar became a consolidated school district. In October of that year citizens voted by a margin of two to one to incorporate the town. After the Bank of Lamar voluntarily liquidated on December 12, 1928, residents conducted their banking in Holdenville. During the 1940s and 1950s the town supported several groceries and gas stations.

The first federal census for Lamar reported a population of 250 in 1930. The number peaked at 296 in 1940. By 1950 it had declined to 180 and continued on a downward spiral to a low of 97 in 1990. At the turn of the twenty-first century Lamar served as a "bedroom" community for 172 residents, the majority of whom commuted thirty to forty-five minutes to work. The 2010 census recorded 158 inhabitants.

By 1918 the surrounding agricultural area supported two cotton gins, two blacksmith shops, a bank, four general stores, and sundry other businesses. With an estimated population of 350, citizens attended the Baptist and Methodist churches and read the weekly newspaper, the Lamar Sun.

== Geography ==
Lamar is located in eastern Hughes County 7 miles (11 km) east of Horntown and 15 miles (24 km) east of Holdenville, the county seat.

According to the United States Census Bureau, the town has a total area of 12.0 square miles (31.2 km^{2}), all land. Lamar sits at the eastern foot of 1,110-foot (340 m) Lamar Mountain, which rises 350 feet (110 m) over the center of town. Lamar drains to the east via Gobbler Creek to the Canadian River.

== Demographics ==
Historical population
Census	Pop.	Note	%±
1930	250		—
1940	296		18.4%
1950	180		−39.2%
1960	150		−16.7%
1970	153		2.0%
1980	121		−20.9%
1990	97		−19.8%
2000	172		77.3%
2010	158		−8.1%
2020	118		−25.3%
U.S. Decennial Census

=== 2020 census ===
As of the 2020 census, Lamar had a population of 118. The median age was 44.0 years. 16.1% of residents were under the age of 18 and 24.6% of residents were 65 years of age or older. For every 100 females there were 93.4 males, and for every 100 females age 18 and over there were 98.0 males age 18 and over.

0.0% of residents lived in urban areas, while 100.0% lived in rural areas.

There were 55 households in Lamar, of which 30.9% had children under the age of 18 living in them. Of all households, 47.3% were married-couple households, 29.1% were households with a male householder and no spouse or partner present, and 12.7% were households with a female householder and no spouse or partner present. About 30.9% of all households were made up of individuals and 14.5% had someone living alone who was 65 years of age or older.

There were 66 housing units, of which 16.7% were vacant. The homeowner vacancy rate was 8.0% and the rental vacancy rate was 10.0%.

Racial composition as of the 2020 census
Race	Number	Percent
White	77	65.3%
Black or African American	1	0.8%
American Indian and Alaska Native	27	22.9%
Asian	0	0.0%
Native Hawaiian and Other Pacific Islander	0	0.0%
Some other race	1	0.8%
Two or more races	12	10.2%
Hispanic or Latino (of any race)	2	1.7%

== Education ==
It is in the Moss Public Schools school district.
