= Levering Mission =

- U.S. National Register of Historic Places
- Location within Oklahoma Location within the United States
- Nearest city: Wetumka, Oklahoma
- Coordinates: 35°14′55″N 96°11′34″W
- Area: 1 acre (0.40 ha)
- Built: 1880
- NRHP reference No.: 74001662
- Added to NRHP: May 16, 1974

Levering Mission (also known as Wetumka Boarding School; Creek National Boarding School) is a historic mission school and hospital founded by the Creek Nation in what is now Wetumka, Oklahoma.

It was built in 1880 with the partnership of the Creek Nation and Southern Baptist Convention. This historic building was added to the National Register of Historic Places listings in Hughes County, Oklahoma in 1974.
