= Wetumka Public Schools =

School district in Oklahoma

Wetumka Public Schools is a school district in Wetumka, Oklahoma which includes an elementary school and a high school. It is governed by an elected board of education.

Wetumka Public Schools is located at: 410 East Benson Wetumka, Oklahoma 74883
