= Stuart Hotel (Stuart, Oklahoma) =

- U.S. National Register of Historic Places
- Location within Oklahoma Location within the United States
- Location: Off U.S. Route 270, Stuart, Oklahoma
- Coordinates: 34°54′12″N 96°05′55″W
- Area: less than one acre
- Built: 1903
- Built by: Nunn, B.A.
- NRHP reference No.: 82001496
- Added to NRHP: October 7, 1982

The Stuart Hotel in Stuart, Oklahoma is a hotel built in 1903. It was listed on the National Register of Historic Places in 1982.

The hotel was built during 1901–03, a few years after the Choctaw, Oklahoma and Gulf Railroad came to town. It served railway workers and drummers. The hotel closed in 1968. Furniture and fixtures remained intact in the building.

The hotel was restored during 1989 to 1991, and converted into a bed-and-breakfast.
