= Allen Independent School District (Oklahoma) =

School district in Oklahoma

Location
- Allen, Oklahoma United States

District information
- Type: Public

Other information
- Website: www.allen.k12.ok.us

The Allen Independent School District is a school district based in Allen, Oklahoma, United States.

The district is partly in Pontotoc County and partly in Hughes County. A portion of Atwood is in the district boundaries.

== See also ==
List of school districts in Oklahoma
