= Dustin, Oklahoma =

Dustin, Oklahoma Epokoke (Creek)
- Town
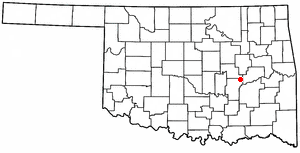
- Location of Dustin, Oklahoma
- Coordinates: 35°16′17″N 96°01′41″W
- Country: United States
- State: Oklahoma
- County: Hughes

Area
  - Total: 0.70 sq mi (1.81 km^{2})
  - Land: 0.64 sq mi (1.67 km^{2})
  - Water: 0.054 sq mi (0.14 km^{2})
- Elevation: 705 ft (215 m)

Population (2020)
  - Total: 327
  - Density: 505.7/sq mi (195.25/km^{2})
- Time zone: UTC-6 (Central (CST))
  - Summer (DST): UTC-5 (CDT)
- ZIP code: 74839
- Area codes: 539/918
- FIPS code: 40-22200
- GNIS feature ID: 2412452

Dustin (Creek: Epokoke) is a town in Hughes County, Oklahoma, United States. The population was 327 at the time of the 2020 United States census.

== History ==
The town was called Watsonville when its community first formed in the late 19th century. When the post office opened there on April 18, 1898, it was officially named Watsonville. The original site was 4 miles (6.4 km) south of the North Canadian River in the area then known as the Creek Nation in Indian Territory.

The post office site was moved 2 miles (3.2 km) north of the present site, and its name changed to Spokogee, on June 27, 1902, though the same person, Marion J. Butler, remained as postmaster. After the Fort Smith and Western Railroad built its Fort Smith–Guthrie line through the area in 1903, the town and post office were both officially changed to Dustin on May 9, 1904. (Note: Cook and Petete's article state that the final name probably honored a railroad official, Henry C. Dustin of Cleveland, Ohio. However, they also state that, according to a local legend, dustin was an indian word meaning "prairie town.")

The Missouri, Oklahoma and Gulf Railway (MO&G), built a north–south line through Dustin in 1905. (Note: This railroad became part of the Kansas, Oklahoma and Gulf Railway Company (KO&G) after 1919.)

Dustin became a trading and commercial center for the surrounding agricultural area. Early businesses included two banks, two drug stores, three doctors, and two hardware stores. Although a school was among the first buildings constructed, it burned down before the school year began. It was soon replaced and two male teachers were hired. The MO&G maintained a railroad round house for working on its locomotives. Before the end of the first decade, Dustin had added four barbershops, a third barbershop, a third drug store, a fourth doctor, a third bank, a livery stable, two hotels, two cotton gins, an ice plant/bottling plant, and a wagon factory. Several newspapers, including the Dustin Dispatch, the Dustin News, and the Dustonian, informed the citizens in the early decades of the twentieth century.

Dustin built its first water supply system in 1912. In the 1930s, the community built Lake Dustin, a community-owned spring-fed 3,200,000 US gallons (12,000 m^{3}) reservoir. In 2012, Dustin began constructing a new municipal water supply system in 2003. The 1910 census reported that Dustin had a population of 579, which increased to an all-time high of 713 in 1920.

== Geography ==
Dustin is located in northeastern Hughes County. Oklahoma State Highway 9 passes through the center of town, leading east 6 miles (10 km) to the Indian Nation Turnpike and west 13 miles (21 km) to Wetumka. Oklahoma State Highway 84 departs OK-9 in the center of Dustin, leading north and west 10 miles (16 km) to Weleetka. Fish Creek flows through the southeast corner of the town, running northeast to the North Canadian River.

According to the United States Census Bureau, Dustin has a total area of 0.60 square miles (1.55 km^{2}), of which 0.01 square miles (0.02 km^{2}), or 1.12%, are water.

== Demographics ==
Historical population
Census	Pop.	Note	%±
1910	579		—
1920	713		23.1%
1930	537		−24.7%
1940	652		21.4%
1950	524		−19.6%
1960	457		−12.8%
1970	502		9.8%
1980	498		−0.8%
1990	429		−13.9%
2000	452		5.4%
2010	395		−12.6%
2020	327		−17.2%
U.S. Decennial Census

=== 2020 census ===
As of the 2020 census, Dustin had a population of 327. The median age was 38.8 years. 29.1% of residents were under the age of 18 and 18.3% of residents were 65 years of age or older. For every 100 females there were 99.4 males, and for every 100 females age 18 and over there were 91.7 males age 18 and over.

0.0% of residents lived in urban areas, while 100.0% lived in rural areas.

There were 114 households in Dustin, of which 35.1% had children under the age of 18 living in them. Of all households, 43.9% were married-couple households, 20.2% were households with a male householder and no spouse or partner present, and 30.7% were households with a female householder and no spouse or partner present. About 22.8% of all households were made up of individuals and 10.5% had someone living alone who was 65 years of age or older.

There were 132 housing units, of which 13.6% were vacant. The homeowner vacancy rate was 0.0% and the rental vacancy rate was 0.0%.

Racial composition as of the 2020 census
Race	Number	Percent
White	146	44.6%
Black or African American	0	0.0%
American Indian and Alaska Native	133	40.7%
Asian	0	0.0%
Native Hawaiian and Other Pacific Islander	3	0.9%
Some other race	2	0.6%
Two or more races	43	13.1%
Hispanic or Latino (of any race)	16	4.9%

=== 2000 census ===
As of the census of 2000, there were 452 people, 164 households, and 120 families residing in the town. The population density was 753.1 inhabitants per square mile (290.8/km^{2}). There were 186 housing units at an average density of 309.9 per square mile (119.7/km^{2}). The racial makeup of the town was 53.76% White, 0.44% African American, 34.29% Native American, 0.22% Pacific Islander, 0.44% from other races, and 10.84% from two or more races. Hispanic or Latino of any race were 1.99% of the population.

There were 164 households, 31.1% had children under the age of 18 living with them, 54.3% were married couples living together, 12.8% had a female householder with no husband present, and 26.8% were non-families. A total of 25.6% of all households were made up of individuals, and 12.2% had someone living alone who was 65 years of age or older. The average household size was 2.76 and the average family size was 3.34.

The population distribution for the town was 28.1% under the age of 18, 7.5% from 18 to 24, 26.1% from 25 to 44, 22.1% from 45 to 64, and 16.2% who were 65 years of age or older. The median age of the residents was 38 years old. For every 100 females, there were 97.4 males. For every 100 females age 18 and over, there were 99.4 males.

The median income for a household in the town was $20,625, and the median income for a family was $24,375. Males had a median income of $24,167 versus $19,063 for females. The per capita income for the town was $8,767. About 28.3% of the families and 35.9% of the population were below the poverty line, including 38.9% of those under age 18 and 34.6% of those age 65 or over.

== Education ==
It is in the Graham-Dustin Public Schools school district.

== Notable persons ==
- Phyllis Fife, Sharon Fife Mouss, Sandy Fife Wilson and Jimmie Carole Fife Stewart, teachers and artists, were born near Dustin.

== Notes ==
Spokogee, Es•po•ko•ke Old name for the Tukahahchee (Tribe) [thought to be a loan word from Shawnee]

== See also ==
- Brooks–McFarland feud
