= John E. Turner House =

- U.S. National Register of Historic Places
- Location within Oklahoma
- Location: 401 E. 10th St., Holdenville, Oklahoma
- Coordinates: 35°04′59″N 96°23′42″W
- Area: less than one acre
- Built: 1910-11
- Built by: McFarlin, Robert; Broughton, Leigh
- NRHP reference No.: 83002090
- Added to NRHP: January 27, 1983

The John E. Turner House, at 401 E. 10th St. in Holdenville, Oklahoma, was listed on the National Register of Historic Places in 1983.

It is a three-story frame house built in 1910-11 by master craftsman Leigh Broughton for R.M. McFarlin.
