= Dustin Agricultural Building =

- U.S. National Register of Historic Places
- Location within Oklahoma Location within the United States
- Location: Rutherford and Fourth Sts., Dustin, Oklahoma
- Coordinates: 35°16′10″N 96°01′45″W
- Area: less than one acre
- Built: 1936
- Built by: Works Progress Administration
- MPS: WPA Public Bldgs., Recreational Facilities and Cemetery Improvements in Southeastern Oklahoma, 1935--1943 TR
- NRHP reference No.: 88001385
- Added to NRHP: September 8, 1988

The Dustin Agricultural Building in Dustin, Oklahoma was built as a Works Progress Administration project in 1936. It is located at Rutherford and Fourth Streets. It was listed on the National Register of Historic Places in 1988.

It is a one-story 63 by 77 feet (19 m × 23 m) structure made of native sandstone. It was deemed notable as "an excellent example of an early WPA project where the quarry and mason work are rather crude. It also suggests just how varied were the different projects of the agency. The Dustin facility seems to have been built for no specific purpose and has been used for cotton storage and peanut drying." When listed it was used by the city for storage of equipment.
