= Holdenville City Hall =

- U.S. National Register of Historic Places
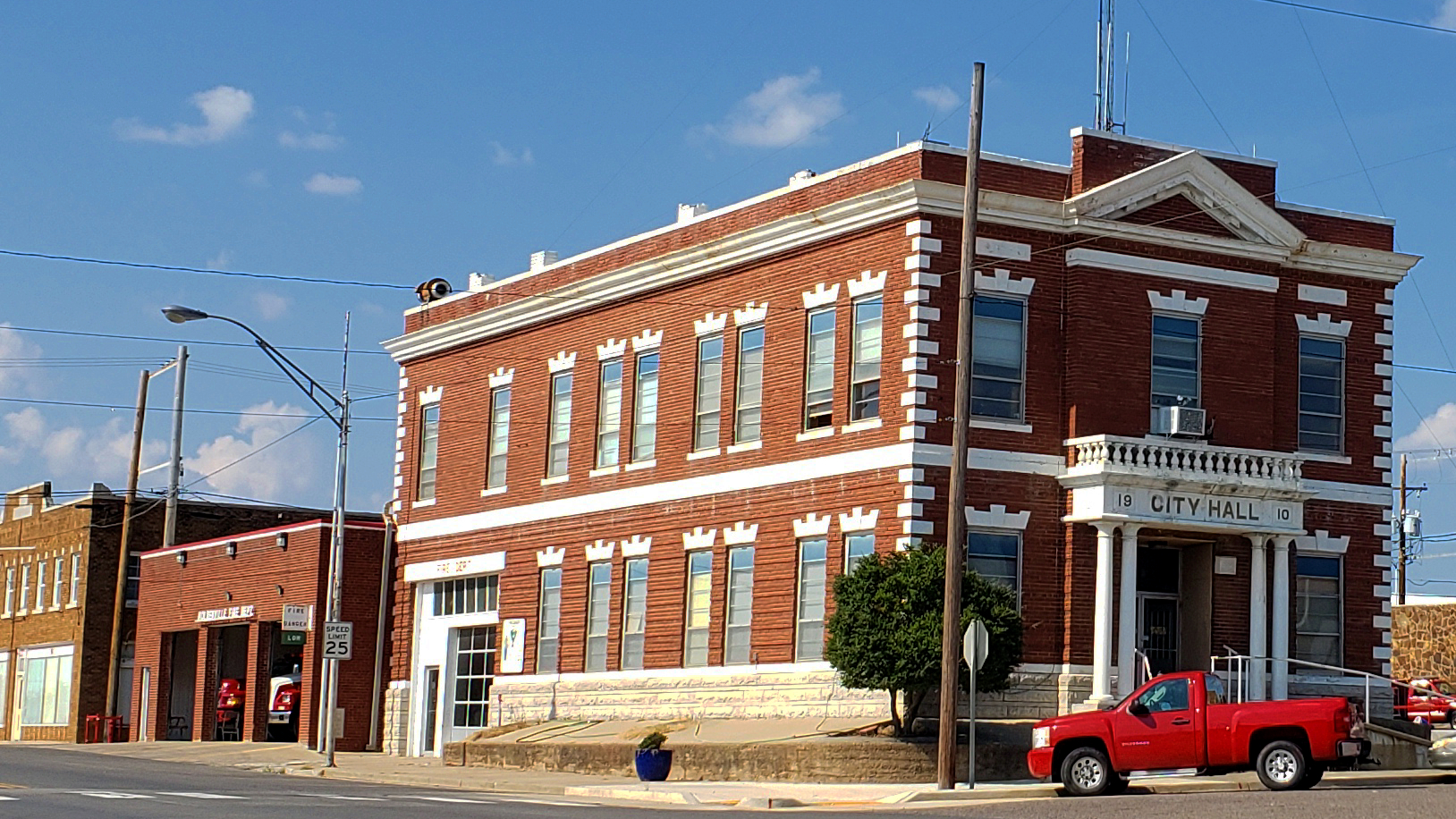
- City Hall in Holdenville, Oklahoma

- Location within Oklahoma Location within the United States
- Location: 102 Creek St., Holdenville, Oklahoma
- Coordinates: 35°05′01″N 96°24′07″W
- Area: less than one acre
- Built: 1910
- Built by: Britton, Jack
- Architectural style: Federal
- NRHP reference No.: 81000463
- Added to NRHP: September 11, 1981

The Holdenville City Hall, at 102 Creek St. in Holdenville, Oklahoma, was built in 1910. It was listed on the National Register of Historic Places in 1981.

It is a red brick building with prominent stone quoins and other details, and has some architectural pretension, being perhaps Federal-influenced. It was built by contractor Jack Britton for $8,700. It was extended to the rear in 1951 to include a fire department.

Its NRHP nomination describes:

It is architectually [sic] significant because it represents a departure from the typical Victorian Romanesque and Western Commercial styles prevalent in Oklahoma architecture. The attempt to reproduce a more classic style for a public building is the physical evidence of emerging order of a frontier town.
