= Holdenville Armory =

- U.S. National Register of Historic Places
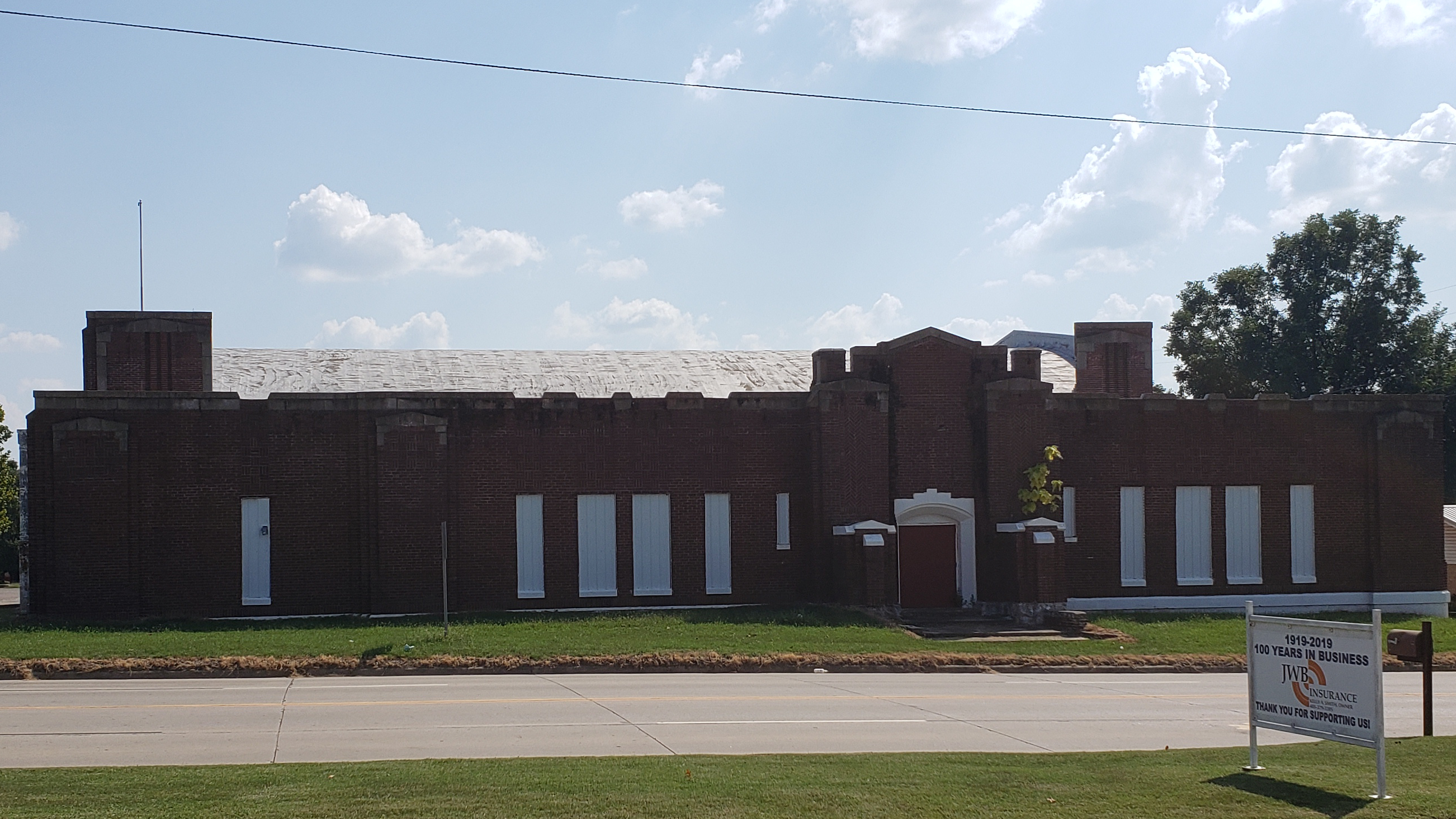
- Front view of Holdenville, Oklahoma armory

- Location within Oklahoma Location within the United States
- Location: US 270 and N. Butts St., Holdenville, Oklahoma
- Coordinates: 35°05′11″N 96°23′01″W
- Area: less than one acre
- Built: 1936
- Built by: Works Progress Administration
- Architectural style: Art Deco
- MPS: WPA Public Bldgs., Recreational Facilities and Cemetery Improvements in Southeastern Oklahoma, 1935--1943 TR
- NRHP reference No.: 88001386
- Added to NRHP: September 8, 1988

The Holdenville Armory, at US 270 and N. Butts St. in Holdenville, Oklahoma, was built in 1936. It was listed on the National Register of Historic Places in 1988.

Its construction was a Works Progress Administration-funded project. It is a red brick one-story 100 by 198 feet (30 m × 60 m) building with "allusion" to Art Deco style.

Its nomination states:

As a WPA building, the armory is exceptional for its use of brick construction materials and decorative pilasters. Architecturally it is unique within the Holdenville community in terms of type, allusion to art deco style, scale and character of workmanship. Construction of the armory provided job opportunities for destitute oil field workers at a time when there were few within the region. It is also significant that the building itself contributed to the military preparedness of a National Guard unit that distinguished itself during the course of World War II.
