= Allen, Oklahoma =

- Town
- Location of Allen, Oklahoma
- Coordinates: 34°52′39″N 96°24′46″W
- Country: United States
- State: Oklahoma
- Counties: Hughes, Pontotoc

Area
  - Total: 0.94 sq mi (2.43 km^{2})
  - Land: 0.94 sq mi (2.43 km^{2})
  - Water: 0 sq mi (0.00 km^{2})
- Elevation: 866 ft (264 m)

Population (2020)
  - Total: 805
  - Density: 856.4/sq mi (330.64/km^{2})
- Time zone: UTC-6 (Central (CST))
  - Summer (DST): UTC-5 (CDT)
- ZIP code: 74825
- Area code: 580
- FIPS code: 40-01400
- GNIS feature ID: 2412349

Allen is a town in Hughes and Pontotoc counties in the U.S. state of Oklahoma. The population was 805 at the 2020 census.

== History ==
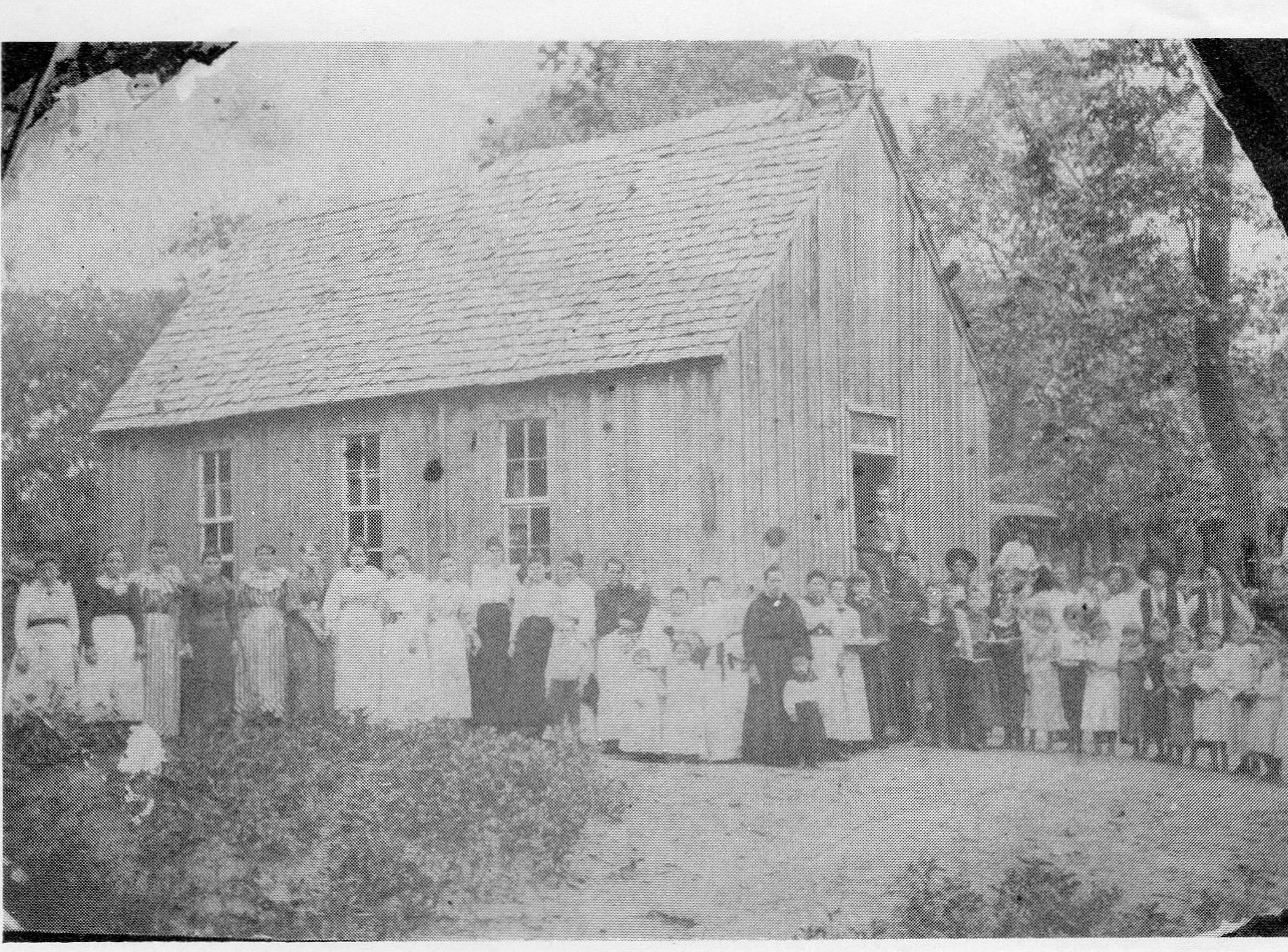
Old photograph of Black Rock School, in Allen, 1896

The town was founded in 1883 by a group of white settlers who had arrived in Choctaw Nation, Indian Territory in 1882 from Gainesville, Texas, led by Confederate Army veteran Doctor John Trigg Gilmore, his wife, Elizabeth Louise Oliveaux, their children, and relatives William and George McCall, with their respective families. They first settled in Cold Springs, northwest of the present town site, where other settlers soon joined them. The first log cabin was built in Allen in 1883, and this building was used as both a school and church. The town was named after the son of deputy United States marshal William McCall.

Allen, Oklahoma is the modern-day site of the Battle of Middle Boggy during the American Civil War.

In 1892, Dr. Gilmore became Allen's first postmaster and founded the town's first Masonic Lodge two years later.

The Missouri, Oklahoma, and Gulf Railway built a line through the area in 1909, although it bypassed Allen, by a half-mile.

Allen became a boomtown in 1913, when an oil well was drilled west of the town. The population rose from 645 in 1910 to 1,389 in 1930, but dropped to 907 in 1970. Its principal industries besides petroleum are ranching and agriculture.

The Ku Klux Klan held weekly meetings in Allen as late as 1923 according to the Allen Democrat, a former local newspaper.

The Allen Advocate is a weekly newspaper published on Thursday in Allen. The newspaper is published by the Robinson Publishing Company, founded in 1982, by Bill and Dayna Robinson. The company also publishes the Coalgate Record Register and the Holdenville Tribune.

== Geography ==
Allen is located on State Highway 1, approximately 19 miles (31 km) northeast of Ada, which is the county seat of Pontotoc County.

According to the United States Census Bureau, the town has a total area of 0.9 square mile (2.4 km^{2}), all land.

== Demographics ==
Historical population
Census	Pop.	Note	%±
1910	645		—
1920	1,377		113.5%
1930	1,438		4.4%
1940	1,389		−3.4%
1950	1,215		−12.5%
1960	1,005		−17.3%
1970	974		−3.1%
1980	998		2.5%
1990	972		−2.6%
2000	951		−2.2%
2010	932		−2.0%
2020	805		−13.6%
U.S. Decennial Census

=== 2020 census ===
As of the 2020 census, Allen had a population of 805. The median age was 40.1 years. 25.7% of residents were under the age of 18 and 18.0% of residents were 65 years of age or older. For every 100 females there were 102.8 males, and for every 100 females age 18 and over there were 91.1 males age 18 and over.

0.0% of residents lived in urban areas, while 100.0% lived in rural areas.

There were 318 households in Allen, of which 39.9% had children under the age of 18 living in them. Of all households, 42.8% were married-couple households, 17.3% were households with a male householder and no spouse or partner present, and 34.9% were households with a female householder and no spouse or partner present. About 25.8% of all households were made up of individuals and 11.9% had someone living alone who was 65 years of age or older.

There were 398 housing units, of which 20.1% were vacant. The homeowner vacancy rate was 8.1% and the rental vacancy rate was 13.0%.

Racial composition as of the 2020 census
Race	Number	Percent
White	522	64.8%
Black or African American	1	0.1%
American Indian and Alaska Native	162	20.1%
Asian	0	0.0%
Native Hawaiian and Other Pacific Islander	0	0.0%
Some other race	9	1.1%
Two or more races	111	13.8%
Hispanic or Latino (of any race)	27	3.4%

=== 2010 census ===
As of the census of 2010, there were 932 people living in the town. The population density was 1,042.1 inhabitants per square mile (402.4/km^{2}). There were 430 housing units at an average density of 487.6 per square mile (188.3/km^{2}). The racial makeup of the town was 77.29% White, 0.42% African American, 14.30% Native American, 0.11% Asian, 0.95% from other races, and 6.94% from two or more races. Hispanic or Latino of any race were 2.00% of the population.

There were 384 households, out of which 28.9% had children under the age of 18 living with them, 51.6% were married couples living together, 9.4% had a female householder with no husband present, and 35.4% were non-families. 32.3% of all households were made up of individuals, and 19.8% had someone living alone who was 65 years of age or older. The average household size was 2.39 and the average family size was 3.03.

In the town, the population was spread out, with 26.2% under the age of 18, 6.9% from 18 to 24, 25.9% from 25 to 44, 20.3% from 45 to 64, and 20.7% who were 65 years of age or older. The median age was 39 years. For every 100 females, there were 86.8 males. For every 100 females age 18 and over, there were 81.9 males.

The median income for a household in the town was $22,632, and the median income for a family was $26,845. Males had a median income of $21,739 versus $17,500 for females. The per capita income for the town was $10,928. About 16.6% of families and 20.4% of the population were below the poverty line, including 24.2% of those under age 18 and 23.4% of those age 65 or over.

== Education ==
Allen is in the Allen Public Schools school district.

Allen has an elementary school, middle school, and high school.
