= Calvin, Oklahoma =

- Town
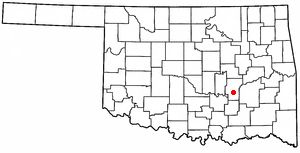
- Location of Calvin, Oklahoma
- Coordinates: 34°57′58″N 96°14′59″W
- Country: United States
- State: Oklahoma
- County: Hughes

Area
  - Total: 0.90 sq mi (2.34 km^{2})
  - Land: 0.90 sq mi (2.33 km^{2})
  - Water: 0 sq mi (0.00 km^{2})
- Elevation: 751 ft (229 m)

Population (2020)
  - Total: 309
  - Density: 343.0/sq mi (132.44/km^{2})
- Time zone: UTC-6 (Central (CST))
  - Summer (DST): UTC-5 (CDT)
- ZIP code: 74531
- Area code: 405
- FIPS code: 40-11100
- GNIS feature ID: 2413151
- Website: www.calvininfo.com

Calvin is a town in Hughes County, Oklahoma, United States. As of the 2020 census, Calvin had a population of 309.

== History ==
The present community of Calvin was established in 1895, when the Choctaw, Oklahoma and Gulf Railroad ("CO&G") (Note: The CO&G later became a subsidiary of the Chicago, Rock Island & Pacific Railway.) laid a line through the Choctaw Nation between McAlester (then in Indian Territory) and Oklahoma City (then in Oklahoma Territory). The community was initially called "Riverview", for its location on the south bank of the Canadian River. The Riverview post office was established on March 21, 1895, with John Wilbur as postmaster. The town and post office names were changed to Calvin in June of 1895, to honor the Choctaw landowner Calvin Perry. The Choctaw Nation Town Site Commission surveyed Calvin's site and divided it into 350 lots, which were then put up for sale.

About 1904, a fire destroyed several business buildings and the Masonic Lodge on Canadian Street (the main street in downtown Calvin). These losses were soon replaced with new all-brick buildings. In 1905, the population was reportedly about 300. From then until the Great Depression, Calvin served as a busy trade center for the area's produce.

In 1906 J. W. Hundley established a store and in 1907 erected a building, the largest mercantile establishment in Hughes County. A ferry operating across the Canadian River gave access to Calvin's cotton market and railroad connections. The Missouri, Oklahoma and Gulf Railway ("MO&G") (Note: This later became part of the Kansas, Oklahoma and Gulf Railway system ("KO&G").) constructed a line through the area, reaching Calvin in 1909. By that time the growing town offered the surrounding agricultural community a choice of four cotton gins, eight general stores, two hotels, and numerous other businesses typical of the era.

== Geography ==
Calvin is located in south-central Hughes County on the south side of the Canadian River. U.S. Route 75 passes just east of the town limits, leading north 19 miles (31 km) to Wetumka and south 32 miles (51 km) to Coalgate. U.S. Route 270 comes in with US 75 from the north but turns east at Calvin and leads 30 miles (48 km) to McAlester. Oklahoma State Highway 1 runs through the center of Calvin, leading east with US 270 to McAlester and west 31 miles (50 km) to Ada.

According to the United States Census Bureau, the town of Calvin has a total area of 0.50 square miles (1.3 km^{2}), all land.

== Demographics ==
Historical population
Census	Pop.	Note	%±
1910	570		—
1920	700		22.8%
1930	626		−10.6%
1940	589		−5.9%
1950	557		−5.4%
1960	331		−40.6%
1970	359		8.5%
1980	315		−12.3%
1990	251		−20.3%
2000	279		11.2%
2010	294		5.4%
2020	309		5.1%
U.S. Decennial Census

=== 2020 census ===
As of the 2020 census, Calvin had a population of 309. The median age was 33.7 years. 29.8% of residents were under the age of 18 and 16.2% of residents were 65 years of age or older. For every 100 females there were 91.9 males, and for every 100 females age 18 and over there were 83.9 males age 18 and over.

0.0% of residents lived in urban areas, while 100.0% lived in rural areas.

There were 122 households in Calvin, of which 41.0% had children under the age of 18 living in them. Of all households, 45.9% were married-couple households, 16.4% were households with a male householder and no spouse or partner present, and 33.6% were households with a female householder and no spouse or partner present. About 25.5% of all households were made up of individuals and 17.2% had someone living alone who was 65 years of age or older.

There were 151 housing units, of which 19.2% were vacant. The homeowner vacancy rate was 0.0% and the rental vacancy rate was 19.2%.

Racial composition as of the 2020 census
Race	Number	Percent
White	227	73.5%
Black or African American	0	0.0%
American Indian and Alaska Native	53	17.2%
Asian	1	0.3%
Native Hawaiian and Other Pacific Islander	0	0.0%
Some other race	4	1.3%
Two or more races	24	7.8%
Hispanic or Latino (of any race)	17	5.5%

=== 2000 census ===
As of the census of 2000, there were 279 people, 120 households, and 75 families residing in the town. The population density was 578.6 inhabitants per square mile (223.4/km^{2}). There were 144 housing units at an average density of 298.6 per square mile (115.3/km^{2}). The racial makeup of the town was 82.44% White, 10.75% Native American, and 6.81% of the population.

There were 120 households, out of which 32.5% had children under the age of 18 living with them, 50.0% were married couples living together, 11.7% had a female householder with no husband present, and 36.7% were non-families. 33.3% of all households were made up of individuals, and 15.8% had someone living alone who was 65 years of age or older. The average household size was 2.33 and the average family size was 2.96.

In the town, the population was spread out, with 25.1% under the age of 18, 9.7% from 18 to 24, 29.0% from 25 to 44, 21.1% from 45 to 64, and 15.1% who were 65 years of age or older. The median age was 32 years. For every 100 females, there were 102.2 males. For every 100 females age 18 and over, there were 88.3 males.

The median income for a household in the town was $20,357, and the median income for a family was $23,409. Males had a median income of $17,083 versus $16,500 for females. The per capita income for the town was $10,651. About 21.6% of families and 27.0% of the population were below the poverty line, including 42.4% of those under the age of eighteen and 18.0% of those 65 or over.

== Education ==
It is in the Calvin Public Schools school district.
