= Wetumka, Oklahoma =

Wetumka Ue-Tumhkv (Creek)
- City
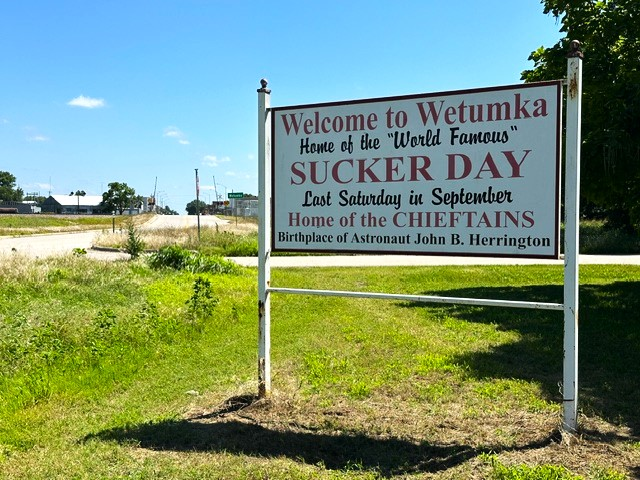
- Wetumka welcome sign in June 2026, referencing Sucker Day

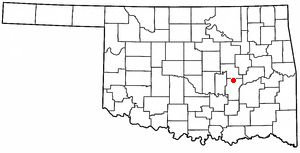
- Location of Wetumka, Oklahoma

- Location within Oklahoma
- Coordinates: 35°14′28″N 96°14′19″W
- Country: United States
- State: Oklahoma
- County: Hughes

Area
  - Total: 1.91 sq mi (4.94 km^{2})
  - Land: 1.88 sq mi (4.88 km^{2})
  - Water: 0.023 sq mi (0.06 km^{2})
- Elevation: 764 ft (233 m)

Population (2020)
  - Total: 1,135
  - Density: 602.3/sq mi (232.55/km^{2})
- Time zone: UTC-6 (Central (CST))
  - Summer (DST): UTC-5 (CDT)
- ZIP code: 74883
- Area codes: 405 and 572
- FIPS code: 40-80500
- GNIS feature ID: 2412245

Wetumka is a city in northern Hughes County, Oklahoma, United States. The population was 1,135 as of the 2020 Census. The Muscogee Creek who first settled it after removal in the 1830s named it for their ancestral town of Wetumpka in Alabama. Wetumka (Creek: Ue-Tumhkv) is a Muskogee language word meaning "rumbling waters."

In the 21st century, it is the headquarters for two federally recognized tribes, the Alabama-Quassarte Tribal Town and the Kialegee Tribal Town. The town holds Sucker Day annually, on the last Saturday in September.

== History ==
The St. Louis, Oklahoma and Southern Railway (Note: Later the St. Louis–San Francisco Railway (SLSF or the Frisco)) built a line from Sapulpa, Oklahoma through Wetumka to the Red River in 1900-1901. Wetumka prospered as a major shipping point for cotton, corn, pecans, and livestock produced by farmers in the surrounding area. An election was held in 1908 to determine the permanent county seat, and Wetumka made it to a runoff election for that title, although Holdenville prevailed. By 1909, the community had three banks, two cotton gins, three blacksmith shops, two liveries, and a tin shop. Early newspapers included the Wetumka News-Herald, the Wetumka News, the Wetumka Herald, and the Wetumka Gazette. A two-story building constructed in 1912 housed the city hall and the Masonic Lodge.

By 1918, four cotton gins, a mill and elevator, a wagonyard, an ice company, and a water and light company had joined the list of businesses open in Wetumka. The 1920 census reported that the population had jumped from 231 in 1910 to 1422 in 1920. Growth would continue through 1950. Since then a long-term decline has lasted through the 2020 census as agriculture has needed fewer workers.

The Wetumka oil field opened in 1919. A crowd of oil workers poured into town. The Encyclopedia of Oklahoma History and Culture estimates the number of temporary workers brought the total city population to about four thousand. However, the 1920 census does not support this number. There was sufficient activity to cause the railroad to build a large freight warehouse in April 1925. A three-story hotel opened in June of that year. With the booming economy, the city paved the streets and added three rooms to the school building.

Perhaps the most significant sign of growth was that the citizens petitioned Governor Jack C. Walton to designate Wetumka as a city of the "first class". Walton signed the proclamation on May 21, 1923, and the city held an election on June 26, 1925 for a mayor, a city marshal, and council members.

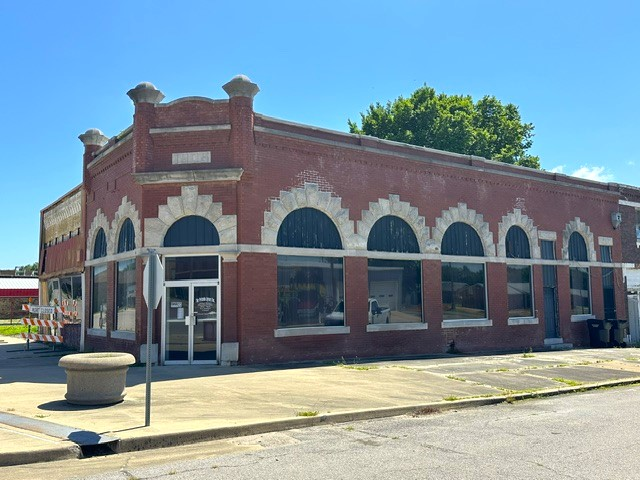
A 1906 building in Wetumka, in June of 2026

By 1930, oil and agriculture were the dominant employers in Wetumka's economy, with five cotton gins and twelve oil companies operating. The city had added nine churches, a park, a lake, and a junior college. Railey Manufacturing Company provided employment to workers who crafted wood flooring and doors. Municipal plants provided water and electricity, Oklahoma Natural Gas supplied gas, and Southwestern State Telephone furnished phone service. But in the 1930s, cotton production began a major decline.

During World War II, the Army operated a prisoner-of-war camp for German prisoners. This closed in 1945 after the end of the war. The city-owned Wetumka General Hospital opened in March 1960. In March 1973 a municipal complex opened to replace city hall, which had been destroyed by fire on November 13, 1971. By the 1970s all cotton gins were defunct.

== Geography ==
Wetumka is approximately 15 miles (24 km) northeast of Holdenville, the county seat.

According to the United States Census Bureau, the city has a total area of 1.9 square miles (4.9 km^{2}), of which 1.9 square miles (4.9 km^{2}) is land and 20% is water.

== Demographics ==
Historical population
| Census | Pop. | Note | %± |
|---|---|---|---|
| 1910 | 231 | | — |
| 1920 | 1,422 | | 515.6% |
| 1930 | 2,153 | | 51.4% |
| 1940 | 2,340 | | 8.7% |
| 1950 | 2,025 | | −13.5% |
| 1960 | 1,798 | | −11.2% |
| 1970 | 1,687 | | −6.2% |
| 1980 | 1,725 | | 2.3% |
| 1990 | 1,427 | | −17.3% |
| 2000 | 1,451 | | 1.7% |
| 2010 | 1,282 | | −11.6% |
| 2020 | 1,135 | | −11.5% |
U.S. Decennial Census

=== 2020 census ===
As of the 2020 census, Wetumka had a population of 1,135. The median age was 42.3 years. 25.5% of residents were under the age of 18 and 19.9% of residents were 65 years of age or older. For every 100 females there were 96.4 males, and for every 100 females age 18 and over there were 90.5 males age 18 and over.

There were 447 households in Wetumka, of which 29.3% had children under the age of 18 living in them. Of all households, 28.0% were married-couple households, 23.3% were households with a male householder and no spouse or partner present, and 38.9% were households with a female householder and no spouse or partner present. About 34.4% of all households were made up of individuals and 15.2% had someone living alone who was 65 years of age or older.

There were 557 housing units, of which 19.7% were vacant. Among occupied housing units, 61.5% were owner-occupied and 38.5% were renter-occupied. The homeowner vacancy rate was 4.3% and the rental vacancy rate was 7.8%.

0% of residents lived in urban areas, while 100.0% lived in rural areas.

Racial composition as of the 2020 census
| Race | Percent |
|---|---|
| White | 42.6% |
| Black or African American | 4.8% |
| American Indian and Alaska Native | 38.5% |
| Asian | 0% |
| Native Hawaiian and Other Pacific Islander | 0.3% |
| Some other race | 1.8% |
| Two or more races | 12.1% |
| Hispanic or Latino (of any race) | 4.2% |

=== 2000 census ===
As of the 2000 census, there were 1,451 people, 591 households, and 346 families residing in the city. The population density was 760.8 inhabitants per square mile (293.7/km^{2}). There were 700 housing units at an average density of 367.0 per square mile (141.7/km^{2}). The racial makeup of the city was 58.37% White, 5.65% African American, 31.63% Native American, 0.07% Pacific Islander, 0.21% from other races, and 4.07% from two or more races. Hispanic or Latino of any race were 2.55% of the population.

There were 591 households, out of which 26.1% had children under the age of 18 living with them, 37.4% were married couples living together, 16.4% had a female householder with no husband present, and 41.3% were non-families. 38.6% of all households were made up of individuals, and 22.7% had someone living alone who was 65 years of age or older. The average household size was 2.31 and the average family size was 3.06.

In the city, the population was spread out, with 26.9% under the age of 18, 8.1% from 18 to 24, 23.7% from 25 to 44, 22.5% from 45 to 64, and 18.8% who were 65 years of age or older. The median age was 39 years. For every 100 females, there were 86.7 males. For every 100 females age 18 and over, there were 78.3 males.

The median income for a household in the city was $17,000.00, and the median income for a family was $21,645. Males had a median income of $18,194 versus $14,091 for females. The per capita income for the city was $9,455. About 31.3% of families and 39.6% of the population were below the poverty line, including 48.4% of those under age 18 and 29.8% of those age 65 or over.

== Education ==
It is in the Wetumka Public Schools school district.

The first school in Wetumka was the Levering Manual Labor Mission School, which opened on September 1, 1881. It was operated by the Home Mission Board of the Southern Baptist Convention, partly funded by the Creek Nation and educated Creek children. The town had a public school system by 1902. The Wes Watkins Technology Center is located in Wetumka. Opened in 1992, it offers vocational training.

== Activities ==
Wetumka was conned by a man named F. Bam Morrison in 1950, and the town laughs about it each year through a celebration called Sucker Day. The event has arts and crafts, music, and a parade of antique cars, tractors, and horses. There is also a ”poker run” for motorcyclists and other participants.

Wetumka Lake, a/k/a Lake Wetumka, offering boat ramps/docks, a fishing dock, picnic areas, a playground, and primitive camping sites, is to the north.

Brooks Lake is to the southeast.

== Transportation ==
The town is at the intersection of U.S. Route 75 and Oklahoma State Highway 9.

Wetumka is home to Petes Airpark (FAA Identifier: 8OL1), a privately owned facility. At least six other airports, including Okmulgee Regional and McAlester Regional, are within a 35-mile radius.

== Notable person ==
- John Herrington, astronaut
