= Holdenville, Oklahoma =

- City
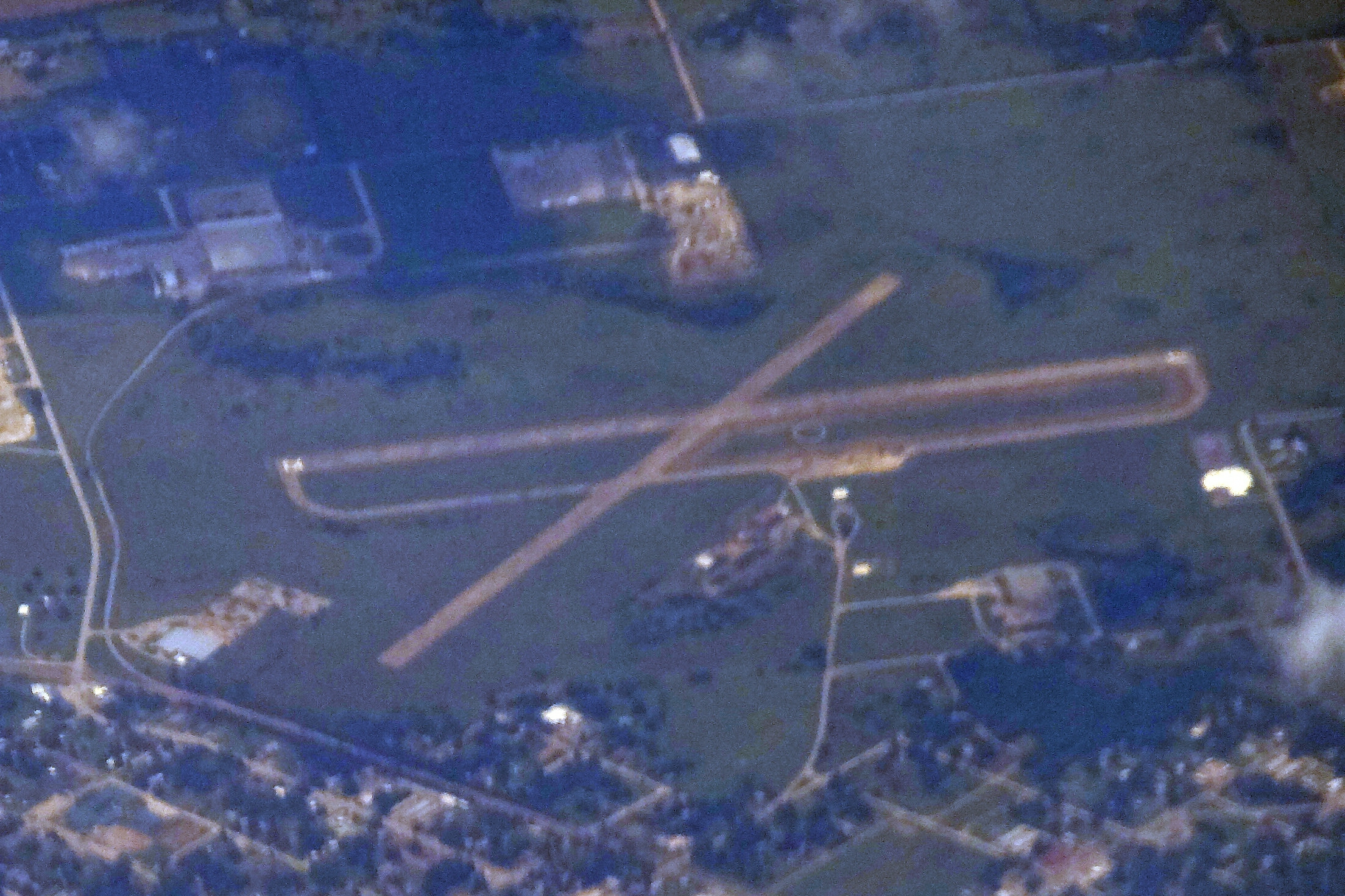

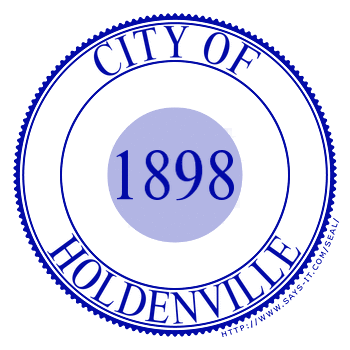
- Seal

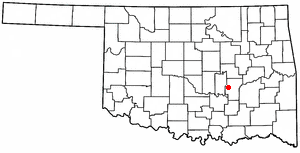
- Location of Holdenville, Oklahoma
- Coordinates: 35°05′01″N 96°24′06″W
- Country: United States
- State: Oklahoma
- County: Hughes
- Founded: 1895
- Incorporated: 1898

Government
  - Type: Mayor-Council

Area
  - Total: 5.04 sq mi (13.05 km^{2})
  - Land: 5.02 sq mi (13.00 km^{2})
  - Water: 0.015 sq mi (0.04 km^{2})
- Elevation: 883 ft (269 m)

Population (2020)
  - Total: 5,934
  - Density: 1,182.2/sq mi (456.44/km^{2})
- Time zone: UTC-6 (Central (CST))
  - Summer (DST): UTC-5 (CDT)
- ZIP code: 74848
- Area codes: 405 and 572
- FIPS code: 40-35400
- GNIS feature ID: 2410774
- Website: www.holdenvillecityhall.com

Holdenville is a city in and the county seat of Hughes County, Oklahoma, United States. The population was 5,934 at the time of the 2020 United States census.

== History ==
Holdenville traces its origin to a Creek settlement called echo, when translated means "deer". George B. Fentress operated a general store there. A post office called "Fentress" opened there on May 24, 1895. The Choctaw, Oklahoma and Gulf Railroad was constructed in the 1890s from Arkansas to Indian Territory. Between 1895 and 1897, the construction passed through the Creek Nation. During this period, a railroad camp was set up to service the railroad construction. The railroad workers called the camp "Holden" in honor of J.F. Holden, the Auditor and Traffic Manager of Choctaw, Oklahoma, and Gulf Railroad. In 1895, a request was delivered to the U.S. Congress to establish a post office in Holden. The request was rejected because the name was too similar to another post office called "Holder." The proposed name was then altered to "Holdenville" and was accepted.

In 1898, settlers petitioned Indian Territory to incorporate Holdenville as a town. A hearing was granted and on November 14, 1898, Holdenville was incorporated as part of Indian Territory. D. J. Red was elected mayor at the first municipal election, held December 27, 1898. The first city council meeting was held January 4, 1899. The St. Louis, Oklahoma and Southern Railway (later the St. Louis and San Francisco Railway) constructed a line between 1900 and 1901 from Sapulpa to the Red River that passed through Holdenville. An election was held on June 27, 1908, to determine the permanent county seat. Contending communities were Holdenville, Wetumka, Calvin, and Lamar. None of the candidates won a majority, so a runoff election was held on September 10, 1908, between the two top vote-getters, Holdenville and Wetumka. This time, Holdenville won the election.

Until it was named in a grand jury investigation in 1904, Holdenville was a sundown town where African Americans were not allowed to live or even wait for a train.

On April 27, 2024, an EF3 tornado struck the town as part of a larger tornado outbreak that affected the Great Plains region, causing two fatalities and extensive damage.

== Geography ==
Holdenville is located about 75 miles (121 km) from Oklahoma City.

Holdenville sits approximately five miles north of the Holdenville City Lake, eight miles north of the Canadian River, and six miles north of the Little River. The area is mostly wooded and flanked by gently rolling hills, interrupted occasionally by small creeks and streams.

According to the United States Census Bureau, the city has a total area of 4.8 square miles (12 km^{2}), all land.

=== Climate ===
Climate data for Holdenville, Oklahoma
Month	Jan	Feb	Mar	Apr	May	Jun	Jul	Aug	Sep	Oct	Nov	Dec	Year
Record high °F (°C)	81 (27)	90 (32)	96 (36)	98 (37)	98 (37)	108 (42)	112 (44)	118 (48)	113 (45)	100 (38)	88 (31)	84 (29)	118 (48)
Mean daily maximum °F (°C)	50 (10)	55 (13)	64 (18)	73 (23)	79 (26)	88 (31)	94 (34)	95 (35)	88 (31)	76 (24)	63 (17)	53 (12)	73 (23)
Mean daily minimum °F (°C)	30 (−1)	33 (1)	41 (5)	50 (10)	59 (15)	67 (19)	71 (22)	70 (21)	63 (17)	52 (11)	40 (4)	32 (0)	51 (10)
Record low °F (°C)	−12 (−24)	−9 (−23)	−1 (−18)	21 (−6)	33 (1)	46 (8)	50 (10)	47 (8)	32 (0)	14 (−10)	11 (−12)	0 (−18)	−12 (−24)
Average precipitation inches (mm)	2.1 (53)	2.0 (51)	2.8 (71)	4.2 (110)	6.0 (150)	4.6 (120)	3.3 (84)	3.2 (81)	3.9 (99)	3.3 (84)	2.4 (61)	2.2 (56)	39.9 (1,010)
Average snowfall inches (cm)	2.3 (5.8)	1.7 (4.3)	0.7 (1.8)	0.1 (0.25)	0 (0)	0 (0)	0 (0)	0 (0)	0 (0)	0 (0)	0.1 (0.25)	0.7 (1.8)	5.6 (14)
Average rainy days	4.8	4.7	5.9	6.9	7.5	7.4	6	5.8	6.1	5.4	4.1	5	69.6
Average relative humidity (%)	69	67	61	58	66	64	63	59	56	58	60	66	62
Source 1: weather.com
Source 2: Weatherbase.com

== Demographics ==
Historical population
Census	Pop.	Note	%±
1900	749		—
1910	2,296		206.5%
1920	2,932		27.7%
1930	7,268		147.9%
1940	6,632		−8.8%
1950	6,192		−6.6%
1960	5,712		−7.8%
1970	5,181		−9.3%
1980	5,469		5.6%
1990	4,792		−12.4%
2000	4,732		−1.3%
2010	5,771		22.0%
2020	5,934		2.8%
U.S. Decennial Census

=== 2020 census ===
As of the 2020 census, Holdenville had a population of 5,934. The median age was 35.8 years. 19.2% of residents were under the age of 18 and 14.0% of residents were 65 years of age or older. For every 100 females there were 152.1 males, and for every 100 females age 18 and over there were 169.7 males age 18 and over.

71.7% of residents lived in urban areas, while 28.3% lived in rural areas.

There were 1,653 households in Holdenville, of which 33.3% had children under the age of 18 living in them. Of all households, 36.2% were married-couple households, 18.1% were households with a male householder and no spouse or partner present, and 36.7% were households with a female householder and no spouse or partner present. About 31.9% of all households were made up of individuals and 15.4% had someone living alone who was 65 years of age or older.

There were 2,099 housing units, of which 21.2% were vacant. Among occupied housing units, 62.3% were owner-occupied and 37.7% were renter-occupied. The homeowner vacancy rate was 6.2% and the rental vacancy rate was 11.1%.

Racial composition as of the 2020 census
Race	Percent
White	56.8%
Black or African American	10.8%
American Indian and Alaska Native	18.1%
Asian	0.3%
Native Hawaiian and Other Pacific Islander	0%
Some other race	5.0%
Two or more races	8.9%
Hispanic or Latino (of any race)	7.2%

=== 2000 census ===
As of the 2000 census, there were 4,732 people, 1,966 households, and 1,236 families residing in the city. The population density was 975.9 inhabitants per square mile (376.8/km^{2}). There were 2,302 housing units at an average density of 474.7 per square mile (183.3/km^{2}). The racial makeup of the city was 75.06% White, 3.44% African American, 14.48% Native American, 0.27% Asian, 0.99% from other races, and 5.75% from two or more races. Hispanic or Latino of any race were 2.45% of the population.

There were 1,966 households, out of which 28.4% had children under the age of 18 living with them, 44.3% were married couples living together, 14.6% had a female householder with no husband present, and 37.1% were non-families. 34.2% of all households were made up of individuals, and 20.0% had someone living alone who was 65 years of age or older. The average household size was 2.31 and the average family size was 2.96.

In the city, the population was spread out, with 24.7% under the age of 18, 8.4% from 18 to 24, 23.2% from 25 to 44, 20.5% from 45 to 64, and 23.2% who were 65 years of age or older. The median age was 40 years. For every 100 females, there were 81.2 males. For every 100 females age 18 and over, there were 76.7 males.

The median income for a household in the city was $20,282, and the median income for a family was $27,175. Males had a median income of $21,020 versus $17,951 for females. The per capita income for the city was $13,326. About 14.8% of families and 20.2% of the population were below the poverty line, including 21.2% of those under age 18 and 18.4% of those age 65 or over.

== Economy ==
Historically, the Holdenville area economy has been based on agriculture. The main crops have been cotton, peanuts, pecans, corn, hay, oats, sweet and Irish potatoes and orchard fruits. Other types of business have supplemented the economy. Covey Corporation manufactured plastic products and employed approximately one hundred fifty workers. Other enterprises included Seamprufe Corporation, a manufacturer of lingerie, and F. B. Fly Company, a producer of fishing tackle. Aquafarms, a catfish processing plant, and the Holdenville State Fish Hatchery also provided employment. In the 1990s Tyson Foods' hog breeding operation and the Earl A. Davis Community Work Center created jobs.

It is home to The Pork Group, a subsidiary of Tyson Foods; the Holdenville State Fish Hatchery, one of four operated by the Oklahoma Department of Wildlife Conservation; and, the Davis Correctional Facility, a 1,600 bed medium security prison operated by the Corrections Corporation of America. The Muscogee (Creek) Nation opened the Creek Nation Casino around 2007, and the tribe broke ground on a new 67,000-square-foot medical facility on February 18, 2026.

== Recreation ==
Since May 1934 nearby Holdenville Lake has offered outdoor recreational activities.

=== Fall Festival ===
Holdenville celebrates the annual Fall Festival on the first Saturday in October. The Festival includes a parade, classic car show, and an open-air market fair with dozens of booths and vendors. The Fall Festival was originally called Hog Wild Day to celebrate Tyson's contribution to Holdenville's economy, and featured a hog-calling contest, a pigtail contest, a pig-out pie-eating contest, and a greased pig contest.

=== Stroup Park ===
Stroup Park is the primary recreation area in Holdenville. It contains a playground, baseball diamond, public swimming pool, basketball court, tennis court, skate park, two pavilions, disc golf course, and numerous picnic tables. There is also a one-mile walking path, duck pond, and a smaller adjacent park called Rose Park which mainly consists of flower gardens.

=== Holdenville City Lake ===
Holdenville City Lake, in addition to providing 80% of the drinking water in Hughes County, is the area's main source of aquatic and woodland recreation. The lake is surrounded by campsites, some of which are equipped with RV hook-ups. There is also a public bath house with restrooms and showers. The lake has two docks, one is covered and reserved for fishing, the other is open-air and used for boat docking. Boats and jet skis are allowed on the lake, but only in certain areas. Tubing, knee-boarding and water skiing are allowed depending on the water level. There are also numerous ATV trails in the vicinity.

== Education ==
All of the city limits is in the Holdenville Public Schools school district, which provides primary and secondary education.

Some areas outside of the city limits are in Moss Public Schools.

== Infrastructure ==
=== Highways ===
- U.S. Route 270
- State Highway 48

=== Airports ===
The Holdenville Municipal Airport (FAA identifier: F99) is about 1 mile northwest of the town. It has existed since 1943, and as of 2026 has a single 3251 x 100 ft runway. Central Airlines made it a regularly scheduled stop in the 1950s.

Commercial air service is available out of Will Rogers World Airport, about 81 miles west-northwest.

=== Railroads ===
- BNSF Railway
- Union Pacific Railroad

== Notable people ==
- Daren Brown, Seattle Mariners manager
- Jackie Brown, Major League Baseball pitcher and pitching coach (uncle of Daren Brown)
- Zora Kramer Brown, breast cancer awareness advocate
- Dave Cox, California State Senator
- "Dizzy" Dean, Major League Baseball pitcher
- Clu Gulager, actor
- Sterlin Harjo, filmmaker
- Jack Jacobs, Canadian Football League quarterback
- Constance N. Johnson, Oklahoma State Senator
- Richard Jordan, NFL player
- Velma Middleton, jazz singer
- T. Boone Pickens, billionaire oil and gas businessman
- Dave Redding, NFL assistant coach
- Bjo Trimble, Science fiction fan and writer

== See also ==
- List of sundown towns in the United States
