= List of school districts in Oklahoma =

This is a list of the 505 public school districts in the U.S. state of Oklahoma. Of those, 415 are independent school districts that offer first grade through 12th grade classes. There are 90 elementary school districts which serve students at lower grade levels; most offer first grade through eighth grade classes, while a few only offer classes through the sixth grade. There were 697,358 students as of October 2024, 17% of the population.

Elementary school districts were previously called "dependent school districts". Elementary school districts and independent school districts both can have bonds issued and raise taxes. The U.S. Census Bureau counts all Oklahoma school districts as separate governments. There are no Oklahoma public school systems dependent on another layer of government.

Oklahoma school districts collectively employ more than 85,000 staff statewide, including teachers, administrators, and support personnel. Typical roles within a district include classroom teachers, principals, counselors, paraprofessionals, custodians, and transportation staff. As of 2025, the average annual salary for a public school teacher in Oklahoma was $55,541, principals averaged $96,200, counselors earned about $59,300, and education support professionals (including custodians and janitors) earned an average of $27,656, the lowest such average in the United States.

== Adair County ==
- Cave Springs Public Schools, Bunch
- Dahlonegah Public School, Stilwell
- Maryetta Public School, Stilwell
- Peavine Public School, Stilwell
- Rocky Mountain Public School, Stilwell
- Stilwell Public Schools, Stilwell
- Watts Public Schools, Watts
- Westville Public Schools, Westville
- Zion Public School, Stilwell

== Alfalfa County ==
- Burlington Public Schools, Burlington
- Cherokee Public Schools, Cherokee
- Timberlake Public Schools, Helena

== Atoka County ==
- Atoka Public Schools, Atoka
- Caney Public Schools, Caney
- Harmony Public School, Atoka
- Lane Public School, Lane
- Stringtown Public Schools, Stringtown
- Tushka Public Schools, Atoka

== Beaver County ==
- Balko Public Schools, Balko
- Beaver Public Schools, Beaver
- Forgan Public Schools, Forgan
- Turpin Public Schools, Turpin

== Beckham County ==
- Elk City Public Schools, Elk City
- Erick Public Schools, Erick
- Merritt Public Schools, Elk City
- Sayre Public Schools, Sayre

== Blaine County ==
- Canton Public Schools, Canton
- Geary Public Schools, Geary
- Okeene Public Schools, Okeene
- Watonga Public Schools, Watonga

== Bryan County ==
- Achille Public Schools, Achille
- Bennington Public Schools, Bennington
- Caddo Public Schools, Caddo
- Calera Public Schools, Calera
- Colbert Public Schools, Colbert
- Durant Independent School District, Durant
- Rock Creek Public Schools, Bokchito
- Silo Public Schools, Durant

== Caddo County ==
- Anadarko Public Schools, Anadarko
- Binger-Oney Public Schools, Binger
- Boone-Apache Public Schools, Apache
- Carnegie Public Schools, Carnegie
- Cement Public Schools, Cement
- Cyril Public Schools, Cyril
- Fort Cobb-Broxton Public Schools, Fort Cobb
- Gracemont Public Schools, Gracemont
- Hinton Public Schools, Hinton
- Hydro-Eakly Public Schools, Hydro
- Lookeba-Sickles Public Schools, Lookeba

== Canadian County ==
- Banner Public School, El Reno
- Calumet Public Schools, Calumet
- Darlington Public School, El Reno
- El Reno Public Schools, El Reno
- Maple Public School, Calumet
- Mustang Public Schools, Mustang
- Piedmont Public Schools, Piedmont
- Riverside Public Schools, El Reno
- Union City Public Schools, Union City
- Yukon Public Schools, Yukon

== Carter County ==
- Ardmore City Schools, Ardmore
- Dickson Public Schools, Ardmore
- Fox Public Schools, Fox
- Healdton Public Schools, Healdton
- Lone Grove Public Schools, Lone Grove
- Plainview Public Schools, Ardmore
- Springer Public Schools, Springer
- Wilson Public Schools, Wilson
- Zaneis Public School, Wilson

== Cherokee County ==
- Briggs Public School, Tahlequah
- Grand View Public School, Tahlequah
- Hulbert Public Schools, Hulbert
- Keys Public Schools, Park Hill
- Lowrey Public School, Tahlequah
- Norwood Public Schools, Hulbert
- Peggs Public School, Peggs
- Shady Grove Public School, Hulbert
- Tahlequah Public Schools, Tahlequah
- Tenkiller Public School, Welling
- Woodall Public School, Tahlequah

== Choctaw County ==
- Boswell Public Schools, Boswell
- Fort Towson Public Schools, Fort Towson
- Hugo Public Schools, Hugo
- Soper Public Schools, Soper

== Cimarron County ==
- Boise City Public Schools, Boise City
- Felt Public Schools, Felt

== Cleveland County ==
- Lexington Public Schools, Lexington
- Little Axe Public Schools, Norman
- Moore Public Schools, Moore
- Noble Public Schools, Noble
- Norman Public Schools, Norman
- Robin Hill Public School, Norman

== Coal County ==
- Coalgate Public Schools, Coalgate
- Cottonwood Public School, Coalgate
- Tupelo Public Schools, Tupelo

== Comanche County ==
- Bishop Public School, Lawton
- Cache Public Schools, Cache
- Chattanooga Public Schools, Chattanooga
- Elgin Public Schools, Elgin
- Fletcher Public Schools, Fletcher
- Flower Mound Public School, Lawton
- Geronimo Public Schools, Geronimo
- Indiahoma Public Schools, Indiahoma
- Lawton Public Schools, Lawton
- Sterling Public Schools, Sterling

== Cotton County ==
- Big Pasture Public Schools, Randlett
- Temple Public Schools, Temple
- Walters Public Schools, Walters

== Craig County ==
- Bluejacket Public Schools, Bluejacket
- Ketchum Public Schools, Ketchum
- Vinita Public Schools, Vinita
- Welch Public Schools, Welch
- White Oak Public Schools, Vinita

== Creek County ==
- Allen-Bowden Public School, Tulsa
- Bristow Public Schools, Bristow
- Depew Public Schools, Depew
- Drumright Public Schools, Drumright
- Gypsy Public School, Depew
- Kellyville Public Schools, Kellyville
- Kiefer Public Schools, Kiefer
- Lone Star Public School, Sapulpa
- Mannford Public Schools, Mannford
- Mounds Public Schools, Mounds
- Oilton Public Schools, Oilton
- Olive Public Schools, Drumright
- Pretty Water Public School, Sapulpa
- Sapulpa Public Schools, Sapulpa

== Custer County ==
- Arapaho-Butler Public School District, Arapaho
- Clinton Public Schools, Clinton
- Thomas-Fay-Custer Unified School District, Thomas
- Weatherford Public Schools, Weatherford

== Delaware County ==
- Cleora Public School, Afton
- Colcord Public Schools, Colcord
- Grove Public Schools, Grove
- Jay Public Schools, Jay
- Kansas Public Schools, Kansas
- Kenwood Public School, Salina
- Leach Public School, Twin Oaks
- Moseley Public School, Colcord
- Oaks-Mission Public Schools, Oaks

== Dewey County ==
- Seiling Public Schools, Seiling
- Taloga Public Schools, Taloga
- Vici Public Schools, Vici

== Ellis County ==
- Arnett Public Schools, Arnett
- Fargo Public Schools, Fargo
- Shattuck Public Schools, Shattuck

== Garfield County ==
- Chisholm Public Schools, Enid
- Covington-Douglas Public Schools, Covington
- Drummond Public Schools, Drummond
- Enid Public Schools, Enid
- Garber Public Schools, Garber
- Kremlin-Hillsdale Public Schools, Kremlin
- Pioneer-Pleasant Vale Schools, Waukomis
- Waukomis Public Schools, Waukomis

== Garvin County ==
- Elmore City-Pernell Schools, Elmore City
- Lindsay Public Schools, Lindsay
- Maysville Public Schools, Maysville
- Paoli Public Schools, Paoli
- Pauls Valley Public Schools, Pauls Valley
- Stratford Public Schools, Stratford
- Whitebead Public School, Pauls Valley
- Wynnewood Public Schools, Wynnewood

== Grady County ==
- Alex Public Schools, Alex
- Amber-Pocasset Public Schools, Amber
- Bridge Creek Public Schools, Blanchard
- Chickasha Public Schools, Chickasha
- Friend Public School, Chickasha
- Middleberg Public School, Blanchard
- Minco Public Schools, Minco
- Ninnekah Public Schools, Ninnekah
- Pioneer Public School, Chickasha
- Rush Springs Public Schools, Rush Springs
- Tuttle Public Schools, Tuttle
- Verden Public Schools, Verden

== Grant County ==
- Deer Creek-Lamont Public Schools, Lamont
- Medford Public Schools, Medford
- Pond Creek-Hunter Public Schools, Pond Creek

== Greer County ==
- Granite Public Schools, Granite
- Mangum Public Schools, Mangum

== Harmon County ==
- Hollis Public Schools, Hollis

== Harper County ==
- Buffalo Public Schools, Buffalo
- Laverne Public Schools, Laverne

== Haskell County ==
- Keota Public Schools, Keota
- Kinta Public Schools, Kinta
- McCurtain Public Schools, McCurtain
- Stigler Public Schools, Stigler
- Whitefield Public School, Whitefield

== Hughes County ==
- Calvin Public Schools, Calvin
- Graham-Dustin Public Schools, Weleetka
- Holdenville Public Schools, Holdenville
- Moss Public Schools, Holdenville
- Stuart Public Schools, Stuart
- Wetumka Public Schools, Wetumka

== Jackson County ==
- Altus Public Schools, Altus
- Blair Public Schools, Blair
- Duke Public Schools, Duke
- Navajo Public Schools, Altus
- Olustee-Eldorado Public Schools, Olustee

== Jefferson County ==
- Ringling Public Schools, Ringling
- Ryan Public Schools, Ryan
- Waurika Public Schools, Waurika

== Johnston County ==
- Coleman Public Schools, Coleman
- Mannsville Public School, Mannsville
- Milburn Public Schools, Milburn
- Mill Creek Public Schools, Mill Creek
- Tishomingo Public Schools, Tishomingo
- Wapanucka Public Schools, Wapanucka

== Kay County ==
- Blackwell Public Schools, Blackwell
- Kildare Public School, Ponca City
- Newkirk Public Schools, Newkirk
- Peckham Public School, Newkirk
- Ponca City Public Schools, Ponca City
- Tonkawa Public Schools, Tonkawa

== Kingfisher County ==
- Cashion Public Schools, Cashion
- Dover Public Schools, Dover
- Hennessey Public Schools, Hennessey
- Kingfisher Public Schools, Kingfisher
- Lomega Public Schools, Omega
- Okarche Public Schools, Okarche

== Kiowa County ==
- Hobart Public Schools, Hobart
- Lone Wolf Public Schools, Lone Wolf
- Mountain View-Gotebo Schools, Mountain View
- Snyder Public Schools, Snyder

== Latimer County ==
- Buffalo Valley Public Schools, Talihina
- Panola Public Schools, Panola
- Red Oak Public Schools, Red Oak
- Wilburton Public Schools, Wilburton

== LeFlore County ==
- Arkoma Public Schools, Arkoma
- Bokoshe Public Schools, Bokoshe
- Cameron Public Schools, Cameron
- Fanshawe Public School, Fanshawe
- Heavener Public Schools, Heavener
- Hodgen Public School, Hodgen
- Howe Public Schools, Howe
- Le Flore Public Schools, Le Flore
- Monroe Public School, Monroe
- Panama Public Schools, Panama
- Pocola Public Schools, Pocola
- Poteau Public Schools, Poteau
- Shady Point Public School, Shady Point
- Spiro Public Schools, Spiro
- Talihina Public Schools, Talihina
- Whitesboro Public Schools, Whitesboro
- Wister Public Schools, Wister

== Lincoln County ==
- Agra Public Schools, Agra
- Carney Public Schools, Carney
- Chandler Public Schools, Chandler
- Davenport Public Schools, Davenport
- Meeker Public Schools, Meeker
- Prague Public Schools, Prague
- Stroud Public Schools, Stroud
- Wellston Public Schools, Wellston
- White Rock Public School, McLoud

== Logan County ==
- Coyle Public Schools, Coyle
- Crescent Public Schools, Crescent
- Guthrie Public Schools, Guthrie
- Mulhall-Orlando Public Schools, Orlando

== Love County ==
- Marietta Public Schools, Marietta
- Thackerville Public Schools, Thackerville
- Turner Public Schools, Burneyville

== Major County ==
- Aline-Cleo Public Schools, Aline
- Cimarron Public Schools, Lahoma
- Fairview Public Schools, Fairview
- Ringwood Public Schools, Ringwood

== Marshall County ==
- Kingston Public Schools, Kingston
- Madill Public Schools, Madill

== Mayes County ==
- Adair Public Schools, Adair
- Chouteau-Mazie Public Schools, Chouteau
- Locust Grove Public Schools, Locust Grove
- Osage Public School, Pryor
- Pryor Public Schools, Pryor
- Salina Public Schools, Salina
- Wickliffe Public School, Salina

== McIntosh County ==
- Checotah Public Schools, Checotah
- Eufaula Public Schools, Eufaula
- Hanna Public Schools, Hanna
- Midway Public Schools, Council Hill
- Ryal Public School, Henryetta
- Stidham Public School, Eufaula

== McClain County ==
- Blanchard Public Schools, Blanchard
- Dibble Public Schools, Dibble
- Newcastle Public Schools, Newcastle
- Purcell Public Schools, Purcell
- Washington Public Schools, Washington
- Wayne Public Schools, Wayne

== McCurtain County ==
- Battiest Public Schools, Battiest
- Broken Bow Public Schools, Broken Bow
- Denison Public School, Idabel
- Eagletown Public Schools, Eagletown
- Forest Grove Public School, Garvin
- Glover Public School, Broken Bow
- Haworth Public Schools, Haworth
- Holly Creek Public School, Broken Bow
- Idabel Public Schools, Idabel
- Lukfata Public School, Broken Bow
- Smithville Public Schools, Smithville
- Valliant Public Schools, Valliant
- Wright City Public Schools, Wright City

== Murray County ==
- Davis Public Schools, Davis
- Sulphur Public Schools, Sulphur

== Muskogee County ==
- Braggs Public Schools, Braggs
- Fort Gibson Public Schools, Fort Gibson
- Haskell Public Schools, Haskell
- Hilldale Public Schools, Muskogee
- Muskogee Public Schools, Muskogee
- Oktaha Public Schools, Oktaha
- Porum Public Schools, Porum
- Wainwright Public School, Wainwright
- Warner Public Schools, Warner
- Webbers Falls Public Schools, Webbers Falls

== Noble County ==
- Billings Public Schools, Billings
- Frontier Public Schools, Red Rock
- Morrison Public Schools, Morrison
- Perry Public Schools, Perry

== Nowata County ==
- Nowata Public Schools, Nowata
- Oklahoma Union Public Schools, South Coffeyville
- South Coffeyville Public Schools, South Coffeyville

== Okfuskee County ==
- Bearden Public School, Okemah
- Mason Public Schools, Mason
- Okemah Public Schools, Okemah
- Paden Public Schools, Paden
- Weleetka Public Schools, Weleetka

== Oklahoma County ==
- Bethany Public Schools, Bethany
- Choctaw-Nicoma Park School District, Choctaw
- Crooked Oak Public Schools, Oklahoma City
- Crutcho Public School, Oklahoma City
- Deer Creek Public Schools, Edmond
- Edmond Public Schools, Edmond
- Harrah Public Schools, Harrah
- Jones Public Schools, Jones
- Luther Public Schools, Luther
- Mid-Del School District, Midwest City
- Millwood Public Schools, Oklahoma City
- Oakdale Public School, Edmond
- Oklahoma City Public Schools, Oklahoma City
- Putnam City School District, Warr Acres
- Western Heights Public Schools, Oklahoma City

== Okmulgee County ==
- Beggs Independent School District, Beggs
- Dewar Public Schools, Dewar
- Henryetta Public Schools, Henryetta
- Morris Public Schools, Morris
- Okmulgee Public Schools, Okmulgee
- Preston Public Schools, Preston
- Schulter Public Schools, Schulter
- Twin Hills Public School, Okmulgee
- Wilson Public Schools, Henryetta

== Osage County ==
- Anderson School District, Sand Springs
- Avant Independent School District, Avant
- Barnsdall Independent School District, Barnsdall
- Bowring Public School, Bowring
- Hominy Public Schools, Hominy
- McCord Public School, Ponca City
- Osage Hills Public School, Bartlesville
- Pawhuska Public Schools, Pawhuska
- Prue Public Schools, Prue
- Shidler Public Schools, Shidler
- Woodland Public Schools, Fairfax
- Wynona Public Schools, Wynona

== Ottawa County ==
- Afton Independent School District, Afton
- Commerce Public Schools, Commerce
- Fairland Public Schools, Fairland
- Miami Public Schools, Miami
- Quapaw Public Schools, Quapaw
- Turkey Ford Public School, Wyandotte
- Wyandotte Public Schools, Wyandotte

== Pawnee County ==
- Cleveland Public Schools, Cleveland
- Jennings Public School, Jennings
- Pawnee Public Schools, Pawnee

== Payne County ==
- Cushing Public Schools, Cushing
- Glencoe Public Schools, Glencoe
- Oak Grove Public School, Cushing
- Perkins-Tryon Public Schools, Perkins
- Ripley Public Schools, Ripley
- Stillwater Public Schools, Stillwater
- Yale Public Schools, Yale

== Pittsburg County ==
- Canadian Public Schools, Canadian
- Crowder Public Schools, Crowder
- Frink-Chambers Public School, McAlester
- Haileyville Public Schools, Haileyville
- Hartshorne Public Schools, Hartshorne
- Haywood Public School, Haywood
- Indianola Public Schools, Indianola
- Kiowa Public Schools, Kiowa
- Krebs Public School, Krebs
- McAlester Public Schools, McAlester
- Pittsburg Public Schools, Pittsburg
- Quinton Public Schools, Quinton
- Savanna Public Schools, Savanna
- Tannehill Public School, McAlester

== Pontotoc County ==
- Ada Independent School District, Ada
- Allen Independent School District, Allen
- Byng Public Schools, Ada
- Latta Public Schools, Ada
- Roff Public Schools, Roff
- Stonewall Public Schools, Stonewall
- Vanoss Public Schools, Ada

== Pottawatomie County ==
- Asher Public Schools, Asher
- Bethel Public Schools, Shawnee
- Dale Public Schools, Dale
- Earlsboro Public Schools, Earlsboro
- Grove Public School, Shawnee
- Macomb Public Schools, Macomb
- Maud Public Schools, Maud
- McLoud Public Schools, McLoud
- North Rock Creek Public School, Shawnee
- Pleasant Grove Public School, Shawnee
- Shawnee Public Schools, Shawnee
- South Rock Creek Public School, Shawnee
- Tecumseh Public Schools, Tecumseh
- Wanette Public Schools, Wanette

== Pushmataha County ==
- Antlers Public Schools, Antlers
- Clayton Public Schools, Clayton
- Moyers Public Schools, Moyers
- Nashoba Public School, Nashoba
- Rattan Public Schools, Rattan
- Tuskahoma Public School, Tuskahoma

== Roger Mills County ==
- Cheyenne Public Schools, Cheyenne
- Hammon Public Schools, Hammon
- Leedey Public Schools, Leedey
- Reydon Public Schools, Reydon
- Sweetwater Public Schools, Sweetwater

== Rogers County ==
- Catoosa Public Schools, Catoosa
- Chelsea Public Schools, Chelsea
- Claremore Public Schools, Claremore
- Foyil Public Schools, Foyil
- Inola Public Schools, Inola
- Justus-Tiawah Public School, Claremore
- Oologah-Talala Public Schools, Oologah
- Sequoyah Public Schools, Claremore
- Verdigris Public Schools, Verdigris

== Seminole County ==
- Bowlegs Public Schools, Bowlegs
- Butner Public Schools, Cromwell
- Justice Public School, Wewoka
- Konawa Public Schools, Konawa
- New Lima Public Schools, Wewoka
- Sasakwa Public Schools, Sasakwa
- Seminole Public Schools, Seminole
- Strother Public Schools, Seminole
- Varnum Public Schools, Seminole
- Wewoka Public Schools, Wewoka

== Sequoyah County ==
- Belfonte Public School, Muldrow
- Brushy Public School, Sallisaw
- Central Public Schools, Sallisaw
- Gans Public Schools, Gans
- Gore Public Schools, Gore
- Liberty Public School, Roland
- Marble City Public School, Marble City
- Moffett Public School, Moffett
- Muldrow Public Schools, Muldrow
- Roland Public Schools, Roland
- Sallisaw Public Schools, Sallisaw
- Vian Public Schools, Vian

== Stephens County ==
- Bray-Doyle Public Schools, Marlow
- Central High Public Schools, Marlow
- Comanche Public Schools, Comanche
- Duncan Public Schools, Duncan
- Empire Public Schools, Duncan
- Grandview Public School, Comanche
- Marlow Public Schools, Marlow
- Velma-Alma Public Schools, Velma

== Texas County ==
- Goodwell Public Schools, Goodwell
- Guymon Public Schools, Guymon
- Hardesty Public Schools, Hardesty
- Hooker Public Schools, Hooker
- Optima Public School, Optima
- Straight Public School, Guymon
- Texhoma Public Schools, Texhoma
- Tyrone Public Schools, Tyrone
- Yarbrough Public Schools, Goodwell

== Tillman County ==
- Davidson Public Schools, Davidson
- Frederick Public Schools, Frederick
- Grandfield Public Schools, Grandfield
- Tipton Public Schools, Tipton

== Tulsa County ==
- Berryhill Public Schools, Tulsa
- Bixby Public Schools, Bixby
- Broken Arrow Public Schools, Broken Arrow
- Collinsville Public Schools, Collinsville
- Glenpool Public Schools, Glenpool
- Jenks Public Schools, Jenks
- Keystone Public School, Sand Springs
- Liberty Public Schools, Mounds
- Owasso Public Schools, Owasso
- Sand Springs Public Schools, Sand Springs
- Skiatook Public Schools, Skiatook
- Sperry Public Schools, Sperry
- Tulsa Public Schools, Tulsa
- Union Public Schools, Tulsa

== Wagoner County ==
- Coweta Public Schools, Coweta
- Okay Public Schools, Okay
- Porter Consolidated Schools, Porter
- Wagoner Public Schools, Wagoner

== Washington County ==
- Bartlesville Public Schools, Bartlesville
- Caney Valley Public Schools, Ramona
- Copan Public Schools, Copan
- Dewey Public Schools, Dewey

== Washita County ==
- Burns Flat-Dill City Schools, Burns Flat
- Canute Public Schools, Canute
- Cordell Public Schools, Cordell
- Sentinel Public Schools, Sentinel

== Woods County ==
- Alva Public Schools, Alva
- Freedom Public Schools, Freedom
- Waynoka Public Schools, Waynoka

== Woodward County ==
- Fort Supply Public Schools, Fort Supply
- Mooreland Public Schools, Mooreland
- Sharon-Mutual Public Schools, Mutual
- Woodward Public Schools, Woodward

== Former school districts ==
- Bell School District - Closed in 2010.
- Big Cabin School District - Closed in 1992, joined Vinita school district.
- Burbank School District 20
- Butler School District - Merged into Arapaho in 2008.
- Fairfax School District - Merged into Woodland in 1990.
- Farris School District - Merged into the Lane district in 2013.
- Greasy Public School - Merged into the Dahlonegah Greasy School district in 2020.
- Medicine Park Public Schools - Closed in 1990, with Elgin and Lawton districts taking portions.
- Picher-Cardin Public Schools
- Ralston School District - Merged into Woodland in 1990.
- Watson Public School - Merged into the Smithville district in 2010.

== See also ==
- List of private schools in Oklahoma
- List of vocational technical schools in Oklahoma
- List of colleges and universities in Oklahoma

== External sources ==
- Oklahoma State Department of Education
