= Farris, Oklahoma =

Unincorporated community in Oklahoma, US

Farris
- Unincorporated community
- Location within the state of Oklahoma Farris (the United States)
- Coordinates: 34°15′45″N 95°52′00″W
- Country: United States
- State: Oklahoma
- County: Atoka
- Elevation: 545 ft (166 m)
- Time zone: UTC-6 (Central (CST))
  - Summer (DST): UTC-5 (CDT)
- ZIP code: 74525
- GNIS feature ID: 1092768

Farris is an unincorporated community in Atoka County, Oklahoma, United States. It lies east of the county seat of Atoka on Highway 3 near the county border.

A post office was established at Farris, Indian Territory on May 17, 1902. It was named for the first postmaster, John L. Farris. At the time of its founding, Farris was located in Jacks Fork County, Choctaw Nation.

McGee Creek Reservoir, which impounds the waters of McGee Creek, lies a short distance to the northwest. McGee Creek is a tributary to Muddy Boggy Creek, which flows west of Farris.

== Education ==
Farris is in the Lane Public School school district.

From 1914 to 2013, Farris had its own school district, Farris Public School, with a K-8 school.

Farris School had been renovated some time before 1964. That year, the district had 47 students. Circa 2003 to 2008 the number of students decreased. In 2008 the enrollment count was 70. That year, the district administration was seeking a merger with Lane school.

After years of declining enrollment, controversies over the district's management, and an "F" rating from the Oklahoma State Department of Education in December 2012, the district voted to dissolve the school district and join the district in nearby Lane in early 2013. After the consolidation, Lane's enrollment increased by around 50 students.

Students above the eighth grade who graduated from the Lane School frequently attend Atoka High School in Atoka (of Atoka Public Schools), some twenty miles west of Farris, or Stringtown high school (of Stringtown School District).
