= White Oak, Oklahoma =

Unincorporated community in Oklahoma, US

- Census-designated place
- Location within the state of Oklahoma White Oak (the United States)
- Coordinates: 36°36′36″N 95°16′35″W
- Country: United States
- State: Oklahoma
- County: Craig

Area
  - Total: 5.97 sq mi (15.46 km^{2})
  - Land: 5.95 sq mi (15.40 km^{2})
  - Water: 0.023 sq mi (0.06 km^{2})
- Elevation: 804 ft (245 m)

Population (2020)
  - Total: 208
  - Density: 35.0/sq mi (13.51/km^{2})
- Time zone: UTC-6 (Central (CST))
  - Summer (DST): UTC-5 (CDT)
- ZIP code: 74301
- FIPS code: 40-80850
- GNIS feature ID: 2584396

White Oak is an unincorporated community and census-designated place (CDP) in Craig County, Oklahoma, United States, along State Highway 66, approximately one mile (1.6 km) west of that road's eastern terminus with U.S. Route 60. As of the 2020 census, White Oak had a population of 208. White Oak is the location of the Shawnee Tribe's annual Spring and Fall Bread Dances and Green Corn ceremonies.

== History ==
The community had a post office from October 14, 1898, until October 31, 1957.

== Demographics ==
Historical population
Census	Pop.	Note	%±
2020	208		—
U.S. Decennial Census

=== 2020 census ===
As of the 2020 census, White Oak had a population of 208. The median age was 55.3 years. 17.8% of residents were under the age of 18 and 23.6% of residents were 65 years of age or older. For every 100 females there were 100.0 males, and for every 100 females age 18 and over there were 98.8 males age 18 and over.

0.0% of residents lived in urban areas, while 100.0% lived in rural areas.

There were 92 households in White Oak, of which 27.2% had children under the age of 18 living in them. Of all households, 62.0% were married-couple households, 17.4% were households with a male householder and no spouse or partner present, and 17.4% were households with a female householder and no spouse or partner present. About 16.3% of all households were made up of individuals and 9.8% had someone living alone who was 65 years of age or older.

There were 99 housing units, of which 7.1% were vacant. The homeowner vacancy rate was 0.0% and the rental vacancy rate was 75.0%.

Racial composition as of the 2020 census
Race	Number	Percent
White	101	48.6%
Black or African American	1	0.5%
American Indian and Alaska Native	63	30.3%
Asian	0	0.0%
Native Hawaiian and Other Pacific Islander	0	0.0%
Some other race	0	0.0%
Two or more races	43	20.7%
Hispanic or Latino (of any race)	5	2.4%

== Education ==
It is in White Oak Public Schools. While the district has jurisdiction over grades K-12, since 2010 it sends high school students to Vinita Public Schools and only educates Pre-Kindergarten through grade 8 in-house.
