= Balko Independent School District =

School district in Oklahoma

Coordinates: 36.616750°N 100.731234°W

Location
- Balko, Oklahoma United States

District information
- Type: Public

Balko High School

Location
- 110 Bison Lane; Balko, (Beaver County), Oklahoma 73931; United States

Information
- Type: Public high school
- Principal: Terry Mulbery
- Staff: 7.60 (FTE)
- Enrollment: 46 (2023-24)
- Student to teacher ratio: 6.05
- Colors: Maroon and white
- Nickname: Bison
- Website: Balko High School

The Balko Independent School District is a school district based in Balko, Oklahoma United States. It contains a single K-12 school, the Balko Independent School.

== See also ==
- List of school districts in Oklahoma
