= Afton Elementary School =

Afton Elementary School may refer to:

- Afton Elementary School - Afton, New York - Afton Central School District
- Afton Elementary School - Afton, Oklahoma - Afton Public Schools
- Afton Elementary School - Yardley, Pennsylvania - Pennsbury School District
- Afton Elementary School - Afton, Wyoming - Lincoln County School District 2
