= Craig County, Oklahoma =

County in Oklahoma, United States

- County
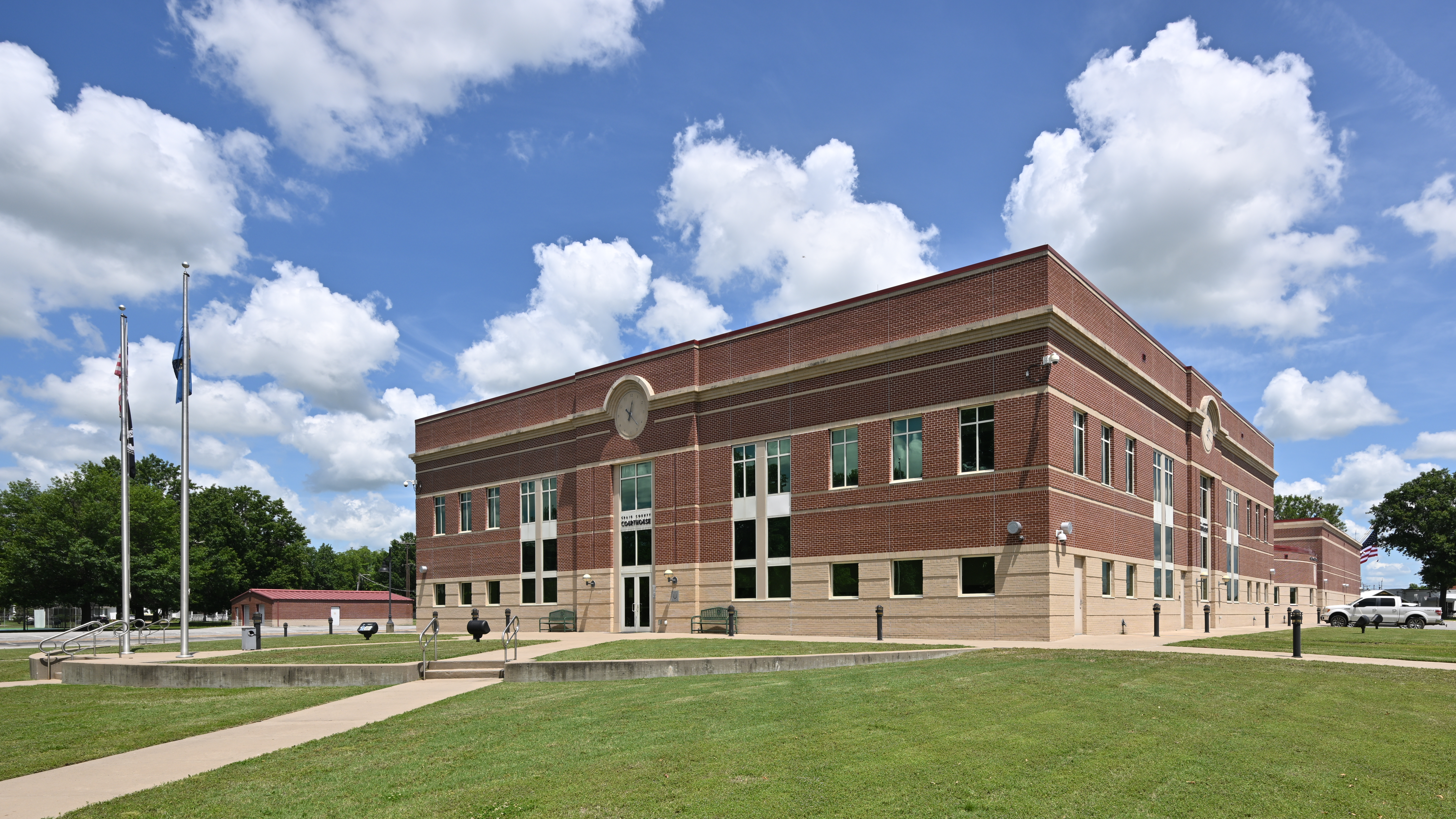
- The new Craig County Courthouse in Vinita (2026)

- Location within the U.S. state of Oklahoma
- Coordinates: 36°46′N 95°13′W
- Country: United States
- State: Oklahoma
- Founded: 1907
- Named for: Granville Craig
- Seat: Vinita
- Largest city: Vinita

Area
  - Total: 763 sq mi (1,980 km^{2})
  - Land: 761 sq mi (1,970 km^{2})
  - Water: 1.4 sq mi (3.6 km^{2}) 0.2%

Population (2020)
  - Total: 14,107
  - Estimate (2025): 14,518 ▲
  - Density: 18.5/sq mi (7.16/km^{2})
- Time zone: UTC−6 (Central)
  - Summer (DST): UTC−5 (CDT)
- Congressional district: 2nd

Craig County is a county in the U.S. state of Oklahoma. As of the 2020 census, the population was 14,107. Its county seat is Vinita. The county was organized in 1907, shortly before statehood, and named for Granville Craig, a prominent Cherokee farmer who lived in the Bluejacket area.

== History ==
In the early 1800s, this area was part of the hunting grounds of the Osage nation and other Plains tribes, some of whom had migrated west from other areas. Members of the Cherokee Nation began moving into the area during the 1830s, particularly after Indian Removal by the US government, which forced them on the "Trail of Tears" to west of the Mississippi River, when they were given land by the United States in exchange for their territory in the Southeast. The area was sparsely populated until after the Civil War. The Texas Road and the East Shawnee Cattle Trail, used for cattle drives from Texas, ran through the eastern part of the present-day Craig County.

Between 1867 and 1870, the U. S. government moved the Shawnee and Delaware tribes into this area from Kansas, another section of Indian Territory. Then the area was assigned as part of the Delaware and Cooweescoowee districts of the Cherokee Nation, Indian Territory, after the US government had made new treaties with the tribes that had allied with the Confederacy during the Civil War.

In 1871, the federal government took Cherokee land for the Missouri, Kansas and Texas Railroad to construct a north–south railroad through this area, while the Atlantic and Pacific Railroad (later acquired by the St. Louis and San Francisco Railway) was allowed to build an east–west line that ran through Vinita in the same year. This line was extended through Tulsa, Oklahoma in 1881–2.

Coal mining began in this area after the Civil War. Mine companies used both tunnel and strip mines, but they did not begin major production until about 1900. Production has continued into the 21st century.

Other resource exploitation was based on oil, and the first oil refinery began operations by 1911; it was operated by Sinclair Oil until the 1920s. Otherwise, farming and ranching were the mainstays of the county economy.

The county was organized in 1907, at the Oklahoma Statehood Convention. It was named for Granville Craig, a prominent Cherokee farmer of mixed race who had property near Bluejacket.

== Geography ==
According to the U.S. Census Bureau, the county has a total area of 763 square miles (1,980 km^{2}), of which 761 square miles (1,970 km^{2}) is land and 1.4 square miles (3.6 km^{2}) (0.2%) is water. The county lies in the Osage Plains, on the western edge of the Ozark Plateau, and drains into several tributaries of the Neosho River.

=== Major highways ===
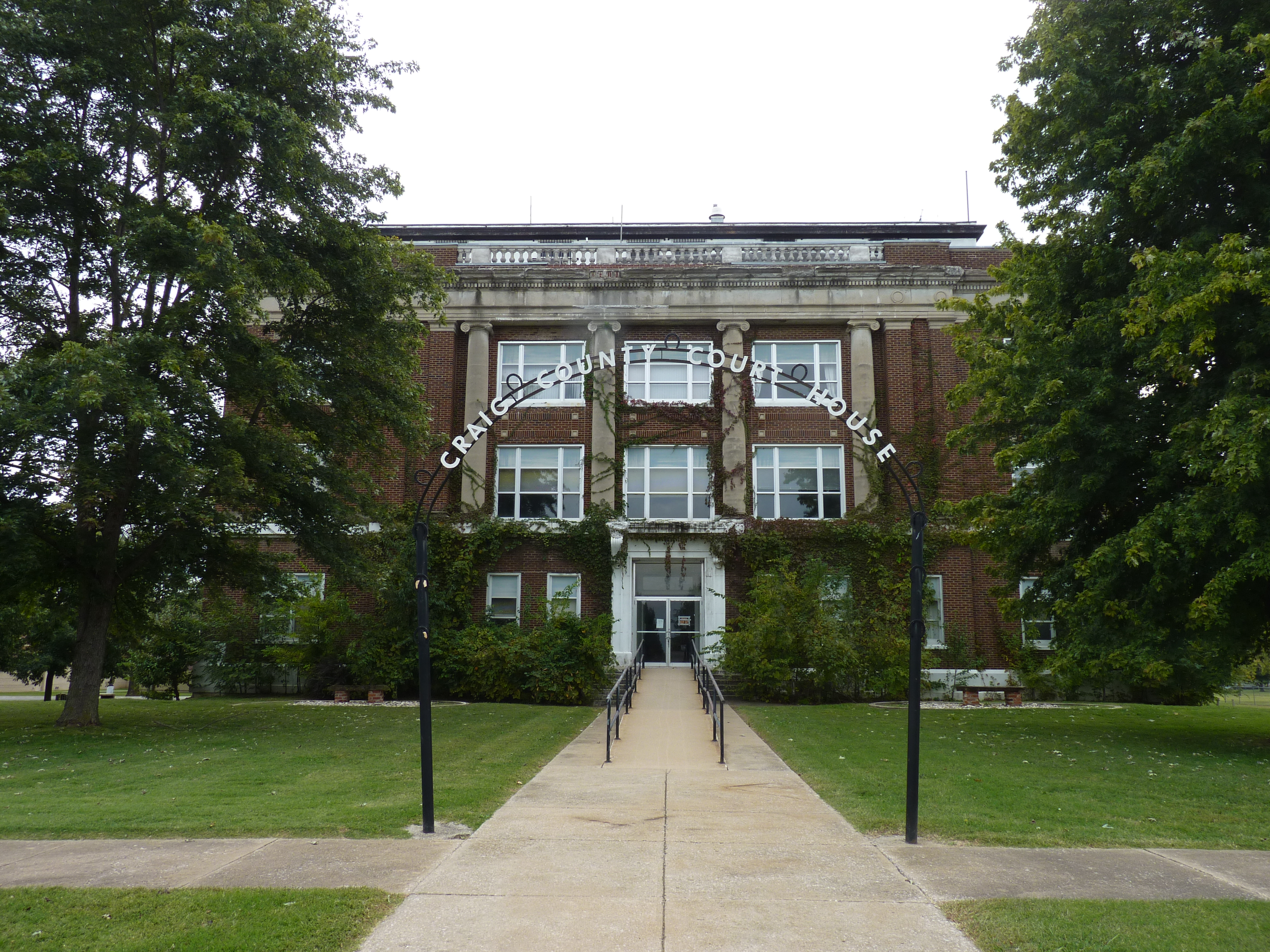
The former Craig County Courthouse in 2010

- Interstate 44 / Will Rogers Turnpike
- U.S. Highway 59
- U.S. Highway 60
- U.S. Highway 69
- State Highway 2
- State Highway 10
- State Highway 25
- State Highway 66
- State Highway 82
- State Highway 85

=== Adjacent counties ===
- Labette County, Kansas (north)
- Cherokee County, Kansas (northeast)
- Ottawa County (east)
- Delaware County (southeast)
- Mayes County (south)
- Rogers County (southwest)
- Nowata County (west)

== Demographics ==
Historical population
Census	Pop.	Note	%±
1910	17,404		—
1920	19,160		10.1%
1930	18,052		−5.8%
1940	21,083		16.8%
1950	18,263		−13.4%
1960	16,303		−10.7%
1970	14,722		−9.7%
1980	15,014		2.0%
1990	14,104		−6.1%
2000	14,950		6.0%
2010	15,029		0.5%
2020	14,107		−6.1%
2025 (est.)	14,518	▲	2.9%
U.S. Decennial Census; 1790-1960 1900-1990; 1990-2000 2010

=== 2020 census ===
As of the 2020 United States census, the county had a population of 14,107. Of the residents, 21.5% were under the age of 18 and 20.3% were 65 years of age or older; the median age was 43.2 years. For every 100 females there were 106.7 males, and for every 100 females age 18 and over there were 106.8 males.

The racial makeup of the county was 60.8% White, 2.7% Black or African American, 20.2% American Indian and Alaska Native, 0.5% Asian, 1.1% from some other race, and 14.6% from two or more races. Hispanic or Latino residents of any race comprised 3.0% of the population.

There were 5,424 households in the county, of which 28.5% had children under the age of 18 living with them and 26.7% had a female householder with no spouse or partner present. About 29.1% of all households were made up of individuals and 14.5% had someone living alone who was 65 years of age or older.

There were 6,369 housing units, of which 14.8% were vacant. Among occupied housing units, 70.1% were owner-occupied and 29.9% were renter-occupied. The homeowner vacancy rate was 2.0% and the rental vacancy rate was 10.4%.

== Politics ==
Voter Registration and Party Enrollment as of June 30, 2023
Party	Number of Voters	Percentage
Democratic	2,743	33.36%
Republican	4,416	53.71%
Others	1,063	12.93%
Total	8,222	100%

United States presidential election results for Craig County, Oklahoma
Year	Republican		Democratic		Third party(ies)	
Year	No.	%	No.	%	No.	%
1908	1,296	44.14%	1,578	53.75%	62	2.11%
1912	1,391	42.34%	1,772	53.94%	122	3.71%
1916	1,647	43.99%	1,901	50.77%	196	5.24%
1920	3,094	50.88%	2,903	47.74%	84	1.38%
1924	2,519	43.54%	3,096	53.51%	171	2.96%
1928	3,511	54.48%	2,897	44.96%	36	0.56%
1932	2,124	30.41%	4,861	69.59%	0	0.00%
1936	2,964	40.30%	4,377	59.52%	13	0.18%
1940	3,582	45.24%	4,316	54.52%	19	0.24%
1944	3,111	47.97%	3,363	51.86%	11	0.17%
1948	2,807	40.16%	4,182	59.84%	0	0.00%
1952	3,830	54.99%	3,135	45.01%	0	0.00%
1956	3,543	53.29%	3,106	46.71%	0	0.00%
1960	3,770	57.45%	2,792	42.55%	0	0.00%
1964	2,541	39.83%	3,838	60.17%	0	0.00%
1968	2,686	44.67%	2,098	34.89%	1,229	20.44%
1972	4,163	70.36%	1,642	27.75%	112	1.89%
1976	2,540	41.11%	3,577	57.90%	61	0.99%
1980	2,956	49.66%	2,801	47.06%	195	3.28%
1984	3,629	58.63%	2,515	40.63%	46	0.74%
1988	2,463	45.23%	2,940	53.98%	43	0.79%
1992	2,106	33.86%	2,780	44.70%	1,333	21.43%
1996	2,058	37.51%	2,649	48.29%	779	14.20%
2000	2,815	51.33%	2,568	46.83%	101	1.84%
2004	3,894	60.86%	2,504	39.14%	0	0.00%
2008	3,858	65.05%	2,073	34.95%	0	0.00%
2012	3,559	67.08%	1,747	32.92%	0	0.00%
2016	4,283	74.04%	1,252	21.64%	250	4.32%
2020	4,686	77.69%	1,217	20.18%	129	2.14%
2024	4,740	78.27%	1,212	20.01%	104	1.72%

== Communities ==
=== Cities ===
- Vinita (county seat)

=== Towns ===
- Big Cabin
- Bluejacket
- Ketchum
- Welch
- Langley

=== Census-designated place ===
- White Oak

=== Unincorporated communities ===
- Centralia

== Education ==
Unified school districts include:

- Afton Public Schools
- Bluejacket Public Schools
- Chelsea Public Schools
- Ketchum Public Schools
- Vinita Public Schools
- Welch Public Schools
- White Oak Public Schools (has separate zones for K-8 only and for 9-12, and it only operates K-8 in-house)

There is one elementary school district, Cleora Public School.

The Big Cabin School District covered parts of the county until its 1992 dissolution. It merged into the Vinita school district.

== NRHP sites ==
The following sites in Craig County are listed on the National Register of Historic Places:

- Craig County Courthouse, Vinita
- First Methodist Episcopal Church, South, Vinita
- Hotel Vinita, Vinita
- McDougal Filling Station, Vinita
- Randall Tire Company, Vinita
- Spraker Service Station, Vinita (demolished)

== Notable people ==
- Shella Bowlin, Cherokee government official and business executive
