= Altus Independent School District =

School district in Oklahoma

Location
- Altus, Oklahoma United States

District information
- Type: Public

Other information
- Website: www.altusps.com

The Altus Independent School District is a school district based in Altus, Oklahoma, United States.

== See also ==
List of school districts in Oklahoma
