= Big Cabin, Oklahoma =

Town in Oklahoma, US

- Town
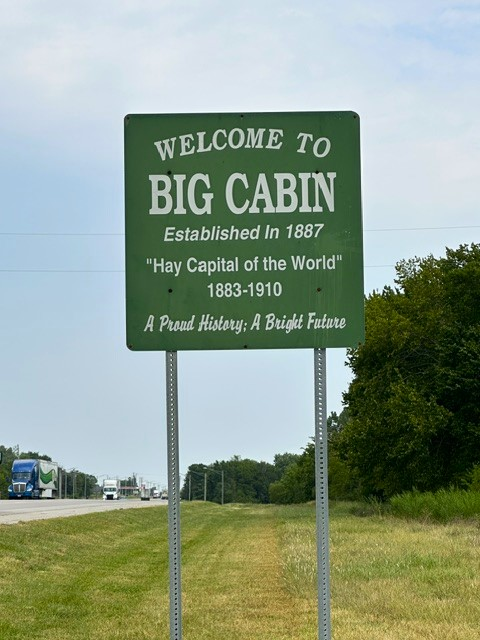
- Big Cabin Welcome Sign in August of 2026

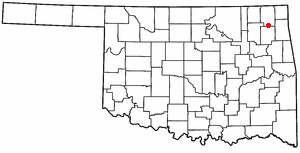
- Location of Big Cabin, Oklahoma
- Coordinates: 36°32′32″N 95°13′19″W
- Country: United States
- State: Oklahoma
- County: Craig

Area
  - Total: 2.34 sq mi (6.05 km^{2})
  - Land: 2.34 sq mi (6.05 km^{2})
  - Water: 0 sq mi (0.00 km^{2})
- Elevation: 715 ft (218 m)

Population (2020)
  - Total: 174
  - Density: 74.4/sq mi (28.74/km^{2})
- Time zone: UTC-6 (Central (CST))
  - Summer (DST): UTC-5 (CDT)
- ZIP code: 74332
- Area codes: 539/918
- FIPS code: 40-05900
- GNIS feature ID: 2411686

Big Cabin is a town in Craig County, Oklahoma, United States. As of the 2020 census, Big Cabin had a population of 174.

== History ==
The town was named for a local landmark, a plank cabin, that existed near the place where the Missouri, Kansas and Texas Railway built a switch in 1871–2. The first post office in this part of Indian Territory opened in 1872. (though it was not named Big Cabin until 1892). Some entrepreneurs built a stockyard in the town in 1888. The first two-story frame building was constructed in 1892. In 1892 the Post Office Department assigned a postal designation to Big Cabin. A school for non-Indian children began in 1895. The railroad built a depot in 1903.

Big Cabin was platted as a town in 1904. It began the process to incorporate in 1926, but did not finish the task until 1958. Meanwhile, the area around Big Cabin became noted for producing hay. A local resident claimed that the town had shipped out more hay between 1893 and 1910 than any other town in the U.S. He claimed that Big Cabin was "the Hay Capital of the World."

== Geography ==
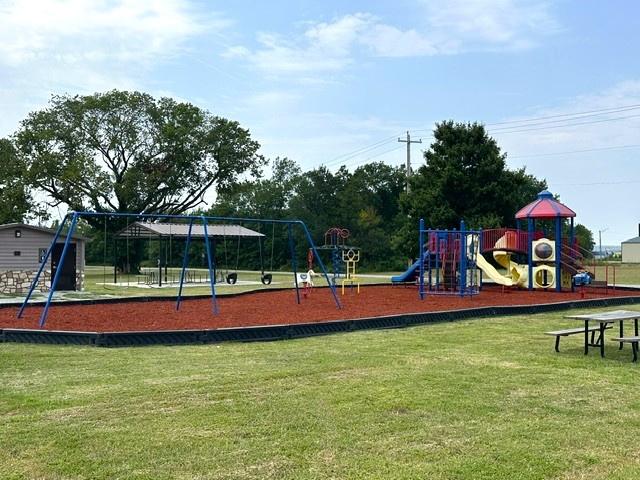
A park in Big Cabin, August of 2026

Big Cabin is located near the southern border of Craig County. U.S. Route 69 passes through the town, leading north 10 miles (16 km) to Vinita, the county seat, and south 8 miles (13 km) to Adair, 60 miles (97 km) to Muskogee, 120 miles (193 km) to McAlester, or 290 miles (467 km) to Dallas, Texas, via US 75. Interstate 44, the Will Rogers Turnpike, passes just north of the town, with access from Exit 283. Via I-44, it is 56 miles (90 km) southwest to Tulsa and 32 miles (51 km) northeast to Miami, or 60 miles (97 km)to Joplin, Missouri.

According to the United States Census Bureau, Big Cabin has a total area of 2.2 square miles (5.7 km^{2}), all land.

== Demographics ==
Historical population
| Census | Pop. | Note | %± |
|---|---|---|---|
| 1930 | 271 | | — |
| 1940 | 270 | | −0.4% |
| 1950 | 210 | | −22.2% |
| 1960 | 228 | | 8.6% |
| 1970 | 198 | | −13.2% |
| 1980 | 252 | | 27.3% |
| 1990 | 271 | | 7.5% |
| 2000 | 293 | | 8.1% |
| 2010 | 265 | | −9.6% |
| 2020 | 174 | | −34.3% |
U.S. Decennial Census

=== 2020 census ===
As of the 2020 census, Big Cabin had a population of 174. The median age was 44.5 years. 22.4% of residents were under the age of 18 and 19.5% of residents were 65 years of age or older. For every 100 females there were 79.4 males, and for every 100 females age 18 and over there were 80.0 males age 18 and over.

There were 73 households in Big Cabin, of which 31.5% had children under the age of 18 living in them. Of all households, 42.5% were married-couple households, 17.8% were households with a male householder and no spouse or partner present, and 32.9% were households with a female householder and no spouse or partner present. About 27.4% of all households were made up of individuals and 10.9% had someone living alone who was 65 years of age or older.

There were 88 housing units, of which 17.0% were vacant. The homeowner vacancy rate was 7.3% and the rental vacancy rate was 4.3%. 0.0% of residents lived in urban areas, while 100.0% lived in rural areas.

Racial composition as of the 2020 census
| Race | Number | Percent |
|---|---|---|
| White | 121 | 69.5% |
| Black or African American | 2 | 1.1% |
| American Indian and Alaska Native | 33 | 19.0% |
| Asian | 1 | 0.6% |
| Native Hawaiian and Other Pacific Islander | 0 | 0.0% |
| Some other race | 0 | 0.0% |
| Two or more races | 17 | 9.8% |
| Hispanic or Latino (of any race) | 3 | 1.7% |

=== 2000 census ===
As of the census of 2000, there were 293 people, 120 households, and 89 families residing in the town. The population density was 140.6 inhabitants per square mile (54.3/km^{2}). There were 137 housing units at an average density of 65.8 per square mile (25.4/km^{2}). The racial makeup of the town was 75.77% White, 14.68% Native American, 0.68% Asian, 0.34% from other races, and 8.53% from two or more races. Hispanic or Latino of any race were 1.71% of the population.

There were 120 households, out of which 35.0% had children under the age of 18 living with them, 56.7% were married couples living together, 15.8% had a female householder with no husband present, and 25.8% were non-families. 23.3% of all households were made up of individuals, and 10.0% had someone living alone who was 65 years of age or older. The average household size was 2.44 and the average family size was 2.84.

In the town, the population was spread out, with 25.9% under the age of 18, 9.2% from 18 to 24, 27.6% from 25 to 44, 24.2% from 45 to 64, and 13.0% who were 65 years of age or older. The median age was 34 years. For every 100 females, there were 98.0 males. For every 100 females age 18 and over, there were 92.0 males.

The median income for a household in the town was $30,972, and the median income for a family was $35,000. Males had a median income of $23,750 versus $21,964 for females. The per capita income for the town was $18,165. About 19.6% of families and 18.9% of the population were below the poverty line, including 25.4% of those under the age of 18 and 10.3% of those 65 or over.

== Government ==
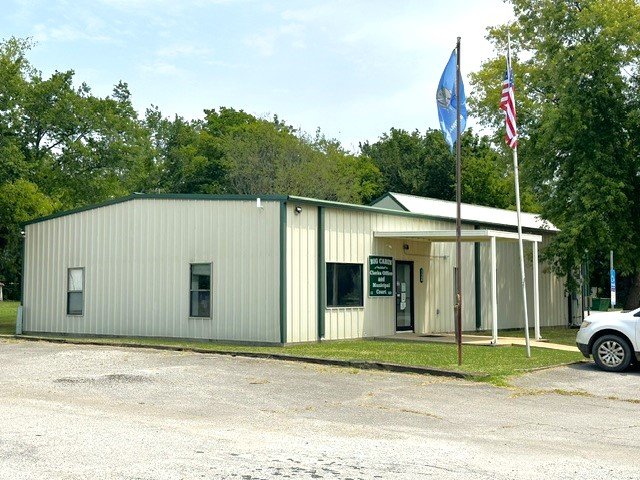
Big Cabin Clerk's Office & Municipal Court, 8-2026

=== Traffic citations ===
In 2004 Big Cabin raised nearly three-fourths of its revenue from traffic citations for speeding. The state of Oklahoma enacted a law in 2004 that penalizes towns where the citation revenue exceeds 50% of the annual budget. As a result of a complaint filed by a local business, Oklahoma's Department of Public Safety designated the town a speed trap, and prohibited the town's officers from writing traffic tickets for six months. The police department maintained that enforcement lowered the annual rate of traffic deaths.

== Education ==
It is in the Vinita Public Schools school district.

In fall 1991 the Big Cabin School District, which had a student population of under 100, voted to dissolve itself. There were referendums on merging with the Adair school district and the White Oak school district, but the residents of the district did not accept them. In May 1992 residents voted to join the Vinita school district.

== Notable people ==
- Grady Louis McMurtry (b. October 18, 1918, d. July 12, 1985, Martinez, CA), Occultist, Grand Master and Outer Head of Ordo Templi Orientis and Ecclesia Gnostica Catholica, 1971–1985.
- Ralph Terry (1926–2022), American major league professional baseball player.
