= Atoka Independent School District =

School district in Oklahoma

Coordinates: 34.379503°N 96.145297°W

Location
- Atoka, Oklahoma United States

District information
- Type: Public

Atoka High School

Location
- 1758 South Greathouse Drive; Atoka, (Atoka County), Oklahoma 74525; United States

Information
- Type: Public high school
- Principal: Kerwin Manion
- Staff: 20.42 (FTE)
- Enrollment: 287 (2023-24)
- Student to teacher ratio: 14.05
- Colors: Maroon, black, and white
- Nickname: Wampus Cats
- Website: Atoka High School

The Atoka Independent School District is a school district based in Atoka, Oklahoma, United States. It contains one elementary school (Atoka Elementary School), one middle school (McCall Middle School), and one high school (Atoka High School).

The district includes the majority of the Atoka city limits. The district also receives high school students who graduated from the K-8 school district Lane Public School, which includes the communities of Lane and Farris.

== See also ==
- List of school districts in Oklahoma
