= Cities Service Station (Afton, Oklahoma) =

- U.S. National Register of Historic Places
- Location within Oklahoma
- Location: Jct. of First St. and Central Ave., Afton, Oklahoma
- Coordinates: 36°41′33″N 94°57′56″W
- Area: less than one acre
- Built: c.1933
- Built by: Cities Service Oil and Gas Co. (now Citgo)
- Architectural style: Mission/spanish Revival
- MPS: Route 66 in Oklahoma MPS
- NRHP reference No.: 95000039
- Added to NRHP: February 23, 1995

Cities Service Station, at the junction of 1st St. and Central Ave. in Afton, Oklahoma, was built before 1933. It was listed on the National Register of Historic Places in 1995.

It was unusual for having restrooms and for the entrances of both sexes' restrooms being located on the exterior of the building.
