= Allen-Bowden School District =

School district in Oklahoma

Location
- Tulsa postal address, Oklahoma United States

District information
- Type: Public
- Grades: PK-8th
- Superintendent: Kenneth Mason

Students and staff
- Students: 303
- District mascot: Wildcat

Other information
- Website: www.allenbowden.org

The Allen-Bowden School District is a school district based in Creek County, Oklahoma United States. It serves preschool through 8th Grade students at an Early Childhood Center (PK-3), a Middle School (4-5), and a Junior High (6-8).

Allen Bowden School Gym, 9-2026

The district includes a portion of Sapulpa. The district facility has a Tulsa post office address, but none of the district's territory lies within the Tulsa city limits.

== See also ==
List of school districts in Oklahoma
