= Arkoma Independent School District =

School district in Oklahoma

Location
- Arkoma, Oklahoma United States

District information
- Type: Public
- Superintendent: Mr. Cyal Walden

Students and staff
- Students: 400
- Teachers: 27
- Staff: 43

The Arkoma Independent School District is a school district based in Arkoma, Oklahoma, United States. It contains a single K-12 school that serves all students. They offer five varsity athletic programs at the school including football, men's and women's basketball, baseball, softball, and men's and women's track and field. Their mascot is the Mustangs, and the school colors are blue and white with red used as an accent.

== See also ==
List of school districts in Oklahoma
