= Rodney Yee =

American yoga instructor (born 1957)

- Born: March 1, 1957
- Occupation: Yoga instructor
- Years active: early 1990s–present
- Spouses: Donna Fone; Colleen Saidman

Rodney Yee is an American yoga instructor who rose to national prominence in the mid-1990s when he was featured on the cover of Yoga Journal magazine and later starred in a series of Gaiam/Living Arts yoga instructional videos and DVDs. Yee has narrated meditation audios and written two books.

== Early life and education ==
Rodney Yee was born in 1957, the Chinese-American son of an Air Force Colonel, and spent his childhood on military bases in Altus, Oklahoma, and Puerto Rico. He was a gymnast during his high school years and later became a ballet dancer, performing with the Oakland Ballet Company and the Matsuyama Ballet Company of Tokyo, Japan. He began studies in philosophy and physical therapy at the University of California, Berkeley, though he dropped out in order to pursue ballet full-time.

== Career ==
Yee became a yoga enthusiast in the Iyengar school, but now teaches a blend of Iyengar Yoga and his own invented style. He began his yoga teaching career at a studio called The Yoga Room in Berkeley; in 1987 he co-founded the Piedmont Yoga Studio in Oakland.

In 2002, several students of Yee's stated that they were having sexual relations with Yee and that the behavior had been going on for some time. Yee was sued for breach of contract, the claim alleging multiple sexual affairs with his students.

== Personal life ==
Yee has three children from his first marriage to Donna Fone, whom he divorced in 2002 after twenty-four years of marriage. He married former model Colleen Saidman, one of his students, in December 2006. Since dating students violates the precepts of yoga teacher conduct as defined by the Yoga Alliance, this led to division in Yee-oriented communities. Yee and Saidman live in The Hamptons.

== Bibliography ==
- Yoga, The Poetry of the Body, Saint Martin's Griffin, 2002. ISBN 978-0312273316
- Moving Toward Balance, Rodale Press, 2004. ISBN 978-0875969213

== Sources ==
- Schneider, Carrie (2003). American Yoga | The paths and practices of America's greatest yoga masters. Barnes & Noble. pp. 76–83. ISBN 978-0760745588.
