= Banner School District =

School district in Oklahoma

Location
- El Reno, Oklahoma United States

District information
- Type: Public

The Banner School District is a school district based in unincorporated Canadian County, Oklahoma, United States. It contains a single K-8 school for all students.

The district includes sections of El Reno, Oklahoma City, Union City, and Yukon.

== See also ==
- List of school districts in Oklahoma
