= Bennington Independent School District =

School district in Oklahoma

Location
- Bennington, Oklahoma United States

District information
- Type: Public

The Bennington Independent School District is a school district based in Bennington, Oklahoma, United States. It contains an elementary school and a combined middle/high school.

== See also ==
- List of school districts in Oklahoma
