= Alva Independent School District =

School district in Oklahoma

Location
- Alva, Oklahoma United States

District information
- Type: Public
- Motto: Alva Goldbugs Strive for Excellence
- Superintendent: Tim Argo

Other information
- Website: http://www.alvaschools.com/

The Alva Independent School District is a school district based in Alva, Oklahoma United States.

== Facilities ==
Building	Grades	Address	Administrator
Alva School District Offices		418 Flynn Street	Superintendent: Tim Argo
Washington Early Childhood Center	Pre-K/1st	701 Barnes	Principal: Shane Feely
Longfellow Elementary School	2nd/3rd	19 West Barnes	Principal: Alysson Tucker
Lincoln Elementary School	4th/5th	1540 Davis Street	Principal: Jenny Webster
Alva Middle School	6th/7th/8th	800 West Flynn Street	Principal: Stephanie Marteney
Alva High School	Fr.-Sr.	501 14th Street	Principal: Vicki Nighswonger

== Awards ==
In 2016 Washington Early Childcare Center was recognized with a national award by Let's Move Active Schools, part of First Lady Michelle Obama's Let's Move! initiative. The school was recognized for their 'outstanding efforts in creating an Active School environment'. To qualify for the award, schools must commit to providing students with at least 60 minutes of physical activity a day, and met benchmarks set by the program including; physical activity during school, physical education, physical activity before and after school, family and community engagement.

== See also ==
List of school districts in Oklahoma
