= Battiest Independent School District =

School district in Oklahoma

Location
- Battiest, Oklahoma United States

District information
- Type: Public
- Superintendent: Tommy Turner

Other information
- Website: https://www.battiest.k12.ok.us/

The Battiest Independent School District is a school district based in Battiest, Oklahoma, United States. It contains an elementary school, a middle school, and a high school. The superintendent is Tommy Turner and the mascot for all grade levels is the Panther.

== See also ==
List of school districts in Oklahoma
