= Anderson School District =

School district in Oklahoma

Anderson School District.

Location
- Sand Springs, Oklahoma United States

District information
- Type: Public

The Anderson School District is a school district based in Sand Springs, Oklahoma, United States. It consists of a single school that serves Kindergarten-Grade 8.

== See also ==
List of school districts in Oklahoma
