= Altus, Oklahoma =

City in Oklahoma, United States

- City
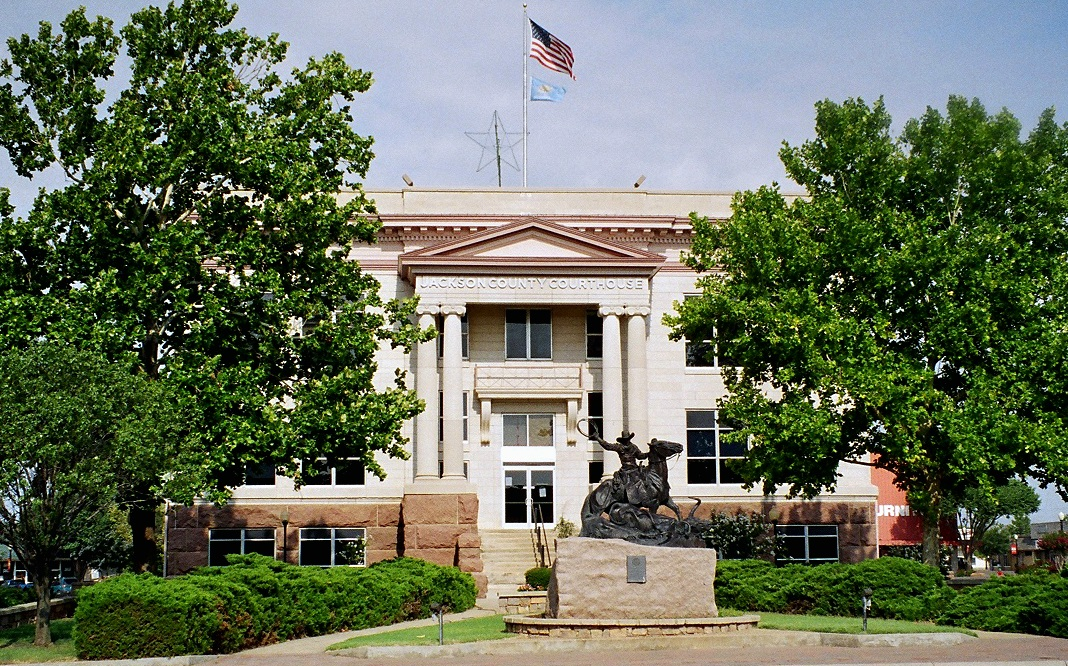
- Jackson County Courthouse in Altus
- Motto: "City with a future to share"
- Location within Oklahoma Location within the United States
- Coordinates: 34.638°N 99.334°W
- Country: United States
- State: Oklahoma
- County: Jackson

Government
  - Type: Council-Manager
  - Mayor: Robert Garrison
  - City Manager: Gary Jones

Area
  - Total: 18.41 sq mi (47.69 km^{2})
  - Land: 18.21 sq mi (47.17 km^{2})
  - Water: 0.20 sq mi (0.52 km^{2})
- Elevation: 1,365 ft (416 m)

Population (2020)
  - Total: 18,729
  - Density: 1,028.3/sq mi (397.03/km^{2})
- Time zone: UTC-6 (Central (CST))
  - Summer (DST): UTC-5 (CDT)
- ZIP codes: 73521-73523
- Area code: 580
- FIPS code: 40-01700
- GNIS feature ID: 2409689
- Website: www.altusok.gov

Altus (/ˈæltəs/) is a city in and the county seat of Jackson County, Oklahoma, United States. The population was 18,729 at the 2020 census.

Altus is home to Altus Air Force Base, the United States Air Force training base for C-17, KC-46 and KC-135 aircrews. It is also home to Western Oklahoma State College and Southwest Technology Center.

== History ==
The town that would later be named Altus was founded in 1886. The community was originally called "Frazer", a settlement of about 50 people on Bitter Creek that served as a trading post on the Great Western Cattle Trail. Cowboys driving herds northward often stopped to buy buttermilk from John McClearan. Thus, the town was known locally as "Buttermilk Station". The Frazer post office opened February 18, 1886. A flash flood nearly destroyed Frazer on June 4, 1891. The residents moved to higher ground 2.5 miles (4.0 km) east of the original site. W. R. Baucum suggested renaming the town "Altus", a Latin word meaning "high". This name stuck, although the town was also known as "Leger" from July 10, 1901, to May 14, 1904.

The population doubled between the time of Oklahoma statehood and the 1910 census and even increased during the Great Depression. Although Altus had been designated as the Jackson county seat at the time of statehood, an election was held in 1908 to determine the permanent seat. The two towns contending were Altus and Olustee. Altus won by a vote of 2,077 to 1,365. The county courthouse was built there in 1910. An irrigation project in the 1940s and World War II led to further growth in the town as the nearby airfield was used to train military pilots.

In 1908, the Kansas City, Mexico and Orient Railway (acquired by the Atchison, Topeka and Santa Fe Railway in 1929) built a line through Altus. Around the same time, the Altus, Wichita Falls and Hollis Railway (which became the Wichita Falls and Northwestern Railway in 1911, then was acquired by the Missouri, Kansas and Texas Railway in 1922) constructed a line from Altus to the Oklahoma-Texas border. The railroads stimulated economic growth in the area and made Altus a regional agricultural center. By 1930, Altus had eight cotton gins, two cotton compresses, and eighteen wholesale businesses.

== Geography ==
Altus is located in northeastern Jackson County. It is situated in what used to be Old Greer County, an area with disputed ownership until a Supreme Court decision awarded it to Oklahoma Territory instead of Texas. The city lies between the main channel and North Fork of the Red River.

According to the United States Census Bureau, the city of Altus has a total area of 18.6 square miles (48.1 km^{2}), of which 18.4 square miles (47.6 km^{2}) are land and 0.2 square miles (0.5 km^{2}), or 1.08%, are water.

=== Climate ===
Altus has a humid subtropical climate (Köppen Cfa) bordering upon a semi-arid climate (BSk). Summers are very hot to sweltering, though occasionally heavy rainfall does occur due to remains of hurricanes moving inland from the Gulf of Mexico. A record high of 120 °F or 48.9 °C was recorded twice in 1936.

Autumn is brief, with generally very warm afternoons and comfortably cool mornings, while winter is extremely variable. Chinook winds can sometimes raise temperatures to uncomfortably hot even in the low winter sun, in the process often drying out vegetation to produce wildfires. On the other hand, if a block forms over the Gulf of Alaska very cold air can be driven into the Plains States from Canada, producing temperatures below 0 °F or −17.8 °C in extreme cases. Such cold temperatures on average occur once every three winters, although on average 78.5 mornings each year fall to or below the freezing point. Snowfall is rare and erratic: the most in a month being 16.1 inches (0.41 m) in January 1966. Most rainfall comes during the unsettled spring season, when heavy thunderstorms can occur from the convergence of hot and cold air masses to produce very intense short-period rainfall. The wettest month was May 1980, with 13.34 inches (338.8 mm). Zero precipitation has on occasion been recorded in every month except May and June. The wettest 24-hour period occurred on October 20, 1983, with 7.10 inches (180.3 mm). The wettest calendar year was 1941 with 49.30 inches (1,252.2 mm) and the driest 1970 with 10.42 inches (264.7 mm).

Climate data for Altus, Oklahoma (elevation 1,380 feet or 420 metres)
Month	Jan	Feb	Mar	Apr	May	Jun	Jul	Aug	Sep	Oct	Nov	Dec	Year
Record high °F (°C)	88 (31)	98 (37)	103 (39)	105 (41)	112 (44)	116 (47)	120 (49)	120 (49)	109 (43)	104 (40)	92 (33)	88 (31)	120 (49)
Mean daily maximum °F (°C)	53.1 (11.7)	58.3 (14.6)	67.4 (19.7)	76.6 (24.8)	84.3 (29.1)	92.8 (33.8)	97.5 (36.4)	96.6 (35.9)	88.4 (31.3)	77.8 (25.4)	65.0 (18.3)	54.4 (12.4)	76.0 (24.4)
Mean daily minimum °F (°C)	26.8 (−2.9)	30.8 (−0.7)	38.1 (3.4)	47.8 (8.8)	57.8 (14.3)	66.8 (19.3)	70.7 (21.5)	69.4 (20.8)	62.0 (16.7)	50.4 (10.2)	38.2 (3.4)	29.4 (−1.4)	49.0 (9.4)
Record low °F (°C)	−11 (−24)	−7 (−22)	6 (−14)	22 (−6)	34 (1)	44 (7)	55 (13)	49 (9)	28 (−2)	17 (−8)	12 (−11)	−10 (−23)	−11 (−24)
Average precipitation inches (mm)	0.93 (24)	1.01 (26)	1.55 (39)	2.36 (60)	3.96 (101)	3.55 (90)	2.05 (52)	2.46 (62)	2.70 (69)	2.84 (72)	1.19 (30)	1.16 (29)	25.76 (654)
Average snowfall inches (cm)	1.8 (4.6)	1.3 (3.3)	0.7 (1.8)	0.1 (0.25)	0 (0)	0 (0)	0 (0)	0 (0)	0 (0)	0 (0)	0.3 (0.76)	0.8 (2.0)	4.9 (12)
Average precipitation days (≥ 0.01 inch)	4	4	5	6	8	7	5	6	6	6	4	4	64
Source: The Western Regional Climate Center

== Demographics ==
Historical population
Census	Pop.	Note	%±
1910	4,821		—
1920	4,522		−6.2%
1930	8,439		86.6%
1940	8,593		1.8%
1950	9,735		13.3%
1960	21,225		118.0%
1970	23,302		9.8%
1980	23,101		−0.9%
1990	21,910		−5.2%
2000	21,447		−2.1%
2010	19,813		−7.6%
2020	18,729		−5.5%

=== 2020 census ===
As of the 2020 census, Altus had a population of 18,729. The median age was 33.7 years. 24.8% of residents were under the age of 18 and 14.9% of residents were 65 years of age or older. For every 100 females there were 101.0 males, and for every 100 females age 18 and over there were 100.5 males age 18 and over.

99.7% of residents lived in urban areas, while 0.3% lived in rural areas.

There were 7,391 households in Altus, of which 31.9% had children under the age of 18 living in them. Of all households, 45.8% were married-couple households, 22.4% were households with a male householder and no spouse or partner present, and 25.6% were households with a female householder and no spouse or partner present. About 31.4% of all households were made up of individuals and 11.4% had someone living alone who was 65 years of age or older.

There were 9,078 housing units, of which 18.6% were vacant. Among occupied housing units, 54.7% were owner-occupied and 45.3% were renter-occupied. The homeowner vacancy rate was 3.7% and the rental vacancy rate was 18.4%.

Racial composition as of the 2020 census
Race	Percent
White	62.1%
Black or African American	8.8%
American Indian and Alaska Native	1.9%
Asian	1.7%
Native Hawaiian and Other Pacific Islander	0.4%
Some other race	11.3%
Two or more races	13.8%
Hispanic or Latino (of any race)	27.0%

=== 2010 census ===
As of the 2010 census, there were 19,813 people living in the city. The population density was 1,200 inhabitants per square mile (460/km^{2}). There were 8,890 housing units at an average density of 540 units per square mile (210 units/km^{2}).

There were 7,896 households, out of which 38.9% had children under the age of 18 living with them, 55.6% were married couples living together, 11.7% had a female householder with no husband present, and 28.7% were non-families. 25.1% of all households were made up of individuals, and 9.5% had someone living alone who was 65 years of age or older. The average household size was 2.62 and the average family size was 3.14.

In the city, the population was spread out, with 29.8% under the age of 18, 11.0% from 18 to 24, 29.8% from 25 to 44, 17.9% from 45 to 64, and 11.5% who were 65 years of age or older. The median age was 32 years. For every 100 females, there were 98.9 males. For every 100 females age 18 and over, there were 94.1 males.

The median income for a household in the city was $30,217, and the median income for a family was $38,400. Males had a median income of $28,041 versus $18,856 for females. The per capita income for the city was $15,378. About 14.6% of families and 17.2% of the population were below the poverty line, including 22.7% of those under age 18 and 12.8% of those age 65 or over.

== Transportation ==
U.S. Routes 62 and 283 cross in the center of Altus. US 62 leads east 73 miles (117 km) to Lawton, and west 66 miles (106 km) to Childress, Texas, while US 283 leads north 23 miles (37 km) to Mangum, and south 34 miles (55 km) to Vernon, Texas.

Altus/Quartz Mountain Regional Airport (KAXS; FAA ID: AXS), 3 miles to the north, has a 5501’ x 75’ paved runway.

Commercial air transportation is available at the Lawton-Fort Sill Regional Airport, about 57 miles to the east.

The Wichita, Tillman and Jackson Railway provides rail freight service.

== Points of interest ==
- Lake Altus-Lugert, about 18 miles (29 km) to the north
- Great Plains State Park, on Tom Steed Reservoir, about 30 miles (48 km) east-northeast.
- Morgan Doll Museum
- Altus Air Force Base

== Education ==
The public schools of Altus are in Oklahoma School District number 18. In the Altus Independent School District there are nine schools, including five elementary schools, an intermediate school, a junior high school, a high school, and a learning center. For the 2011–2012 school year there were approximately 3,851 students.

Western Oklahoma State College and Southwest Technology Center provide opportunities for higher education in the area.

== Notable people ==
- Robert N. Bellah, sociologist of religion
- Jake Colhouer, American football player
- Mark Cotney, National Football League (NFL) player (Tampa Bay Buccaneers)
- Herschal Crow, Oklahoma state senator
- Brandon Dickerson, music video director
- Eddie Fisher, relief pitcher
- Suzi Gardner, guitarist for the band L7
- Kelly Garrison, 1988 Olympic gymnast (competed as Kelly Garrison-Steves)
- Jason Gildon, NFL player; all-time sack leader for the Pittsburgh Steelers
- David Green, founder of Hobby Lobby
- Steve Marino, professional golfer who currently plays on the PGA Tour
- Moon Martin, singer and musician
- Richard Lee McNair, prisoner
- Thomas C. Oden, United Methodist theologian and religious author
- Juan Pérez, Major League Baseball player for the San Francisco Giants, played at Western Oklahoma State College
- Samuel M. Sampler, World War I Medal of Honor Recipient
- Andrelton Simmons, shortstop, Los Angeles Angels, played at Western Oklahoma State College
- John Sterling, NFL player (Green Bay Packers and Denver Broncos)
- Wiz Khalifa, American Rapper, briefly lived in Altus
- Rodney Yee, yoga instructor

== Gallery ==
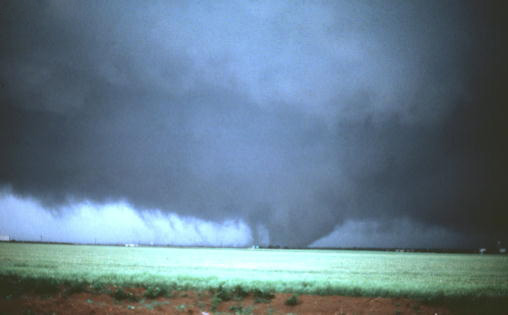
Altus tornado, May 11, 1982

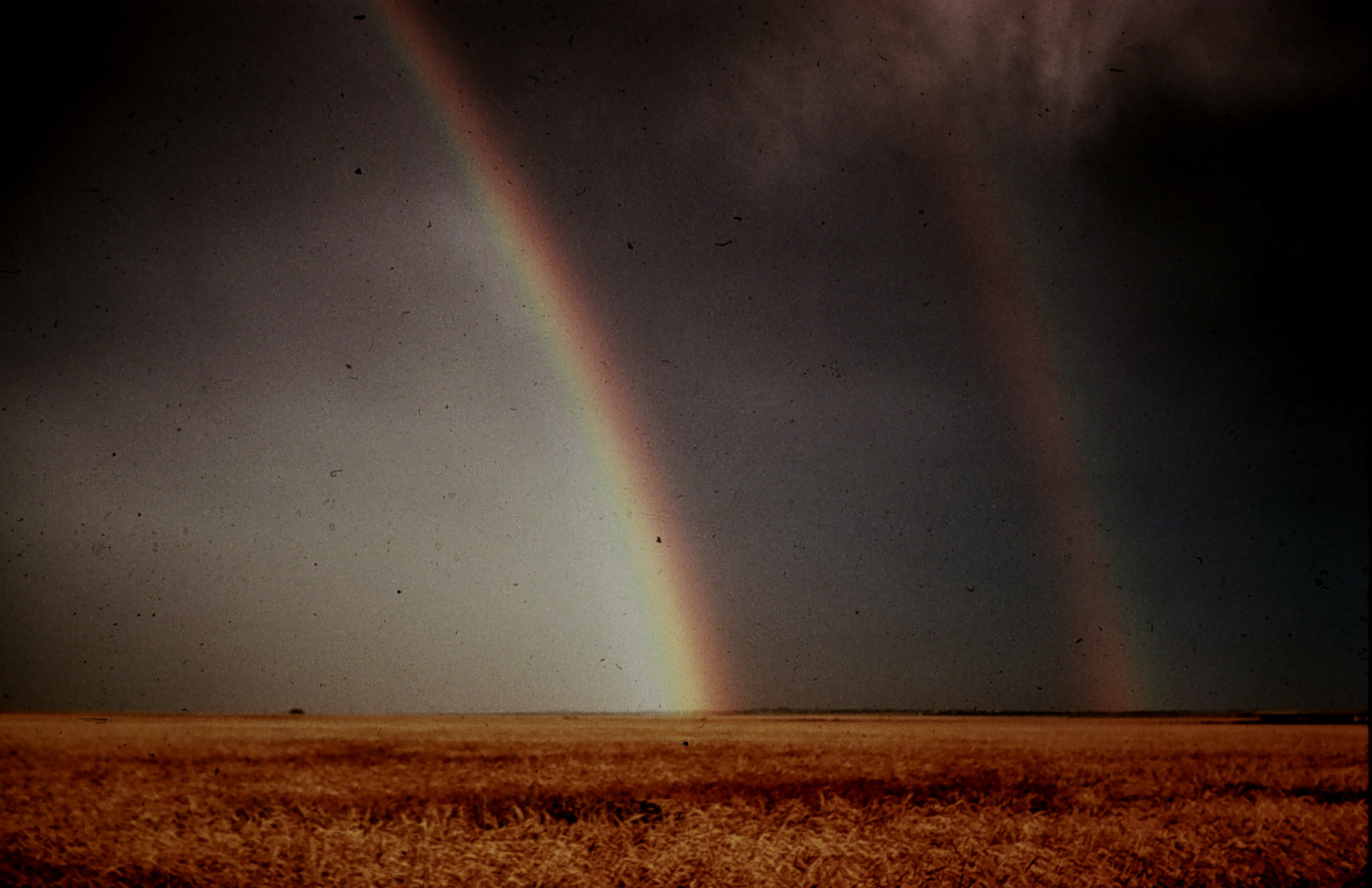
Rainbows near Altus, May 29, 1975

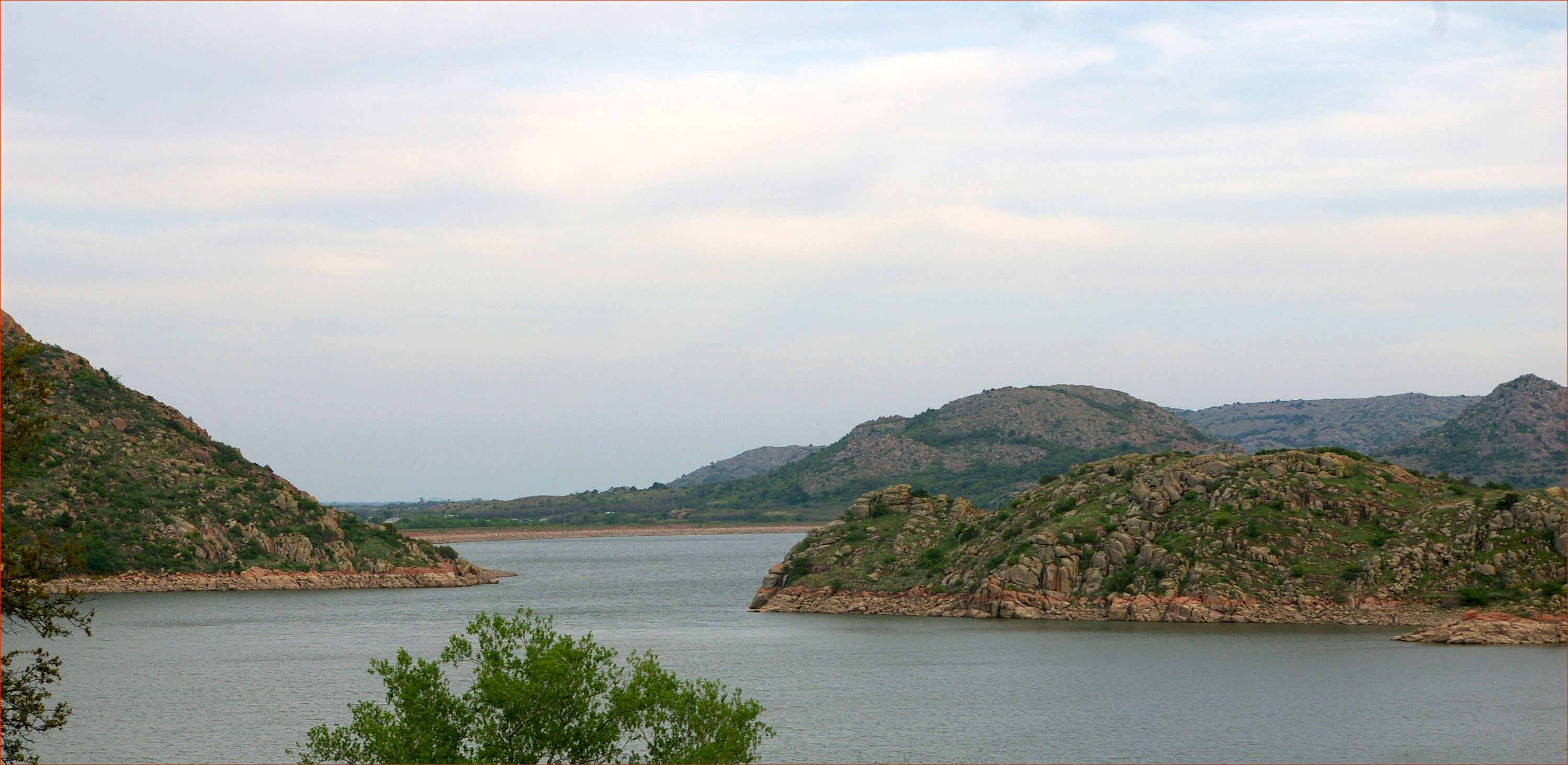
Lake Altus-Lugert, looking south

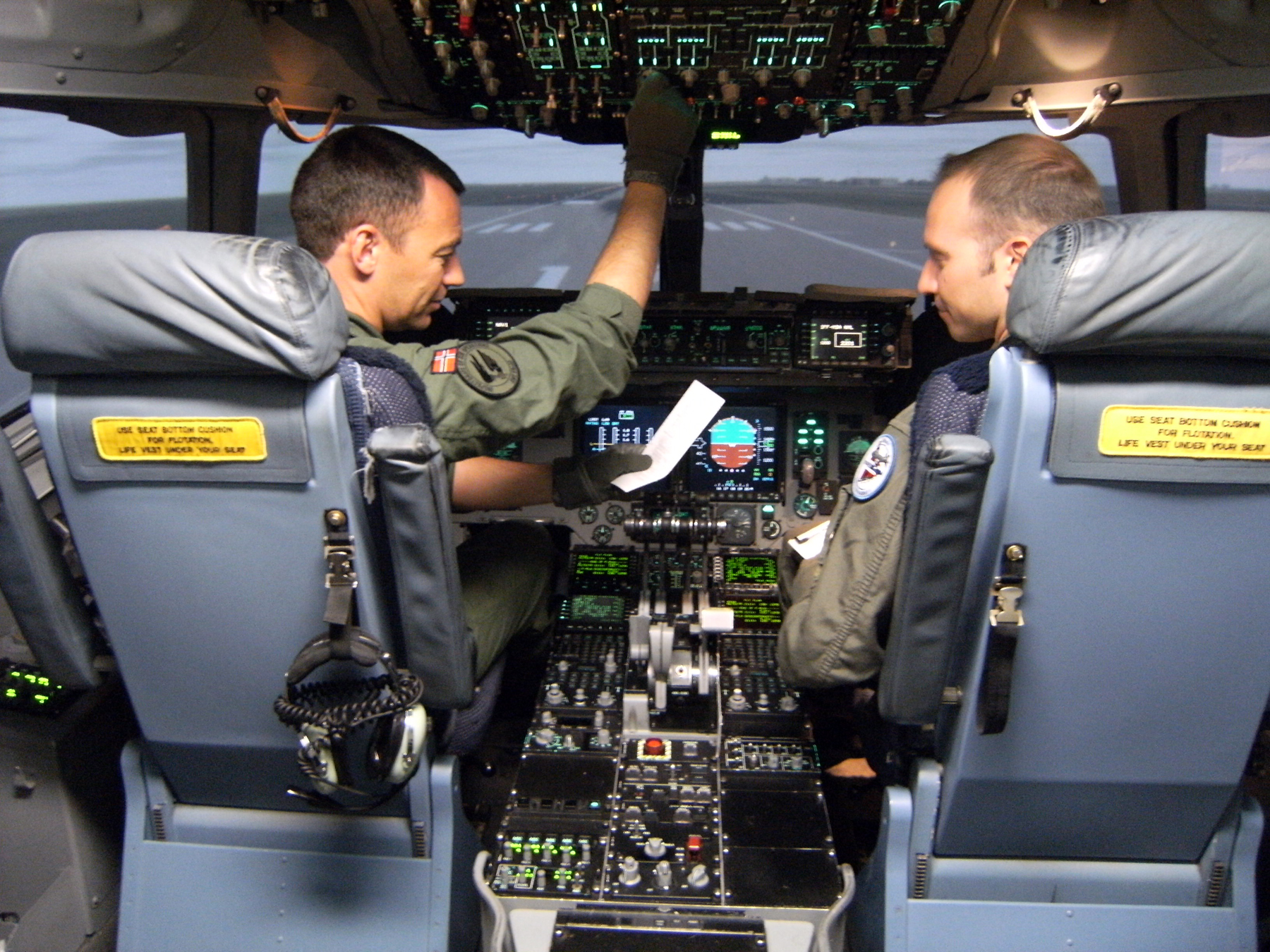
Norwegian pilots training at the C-17 Aircrew Training Center at Altus AFB

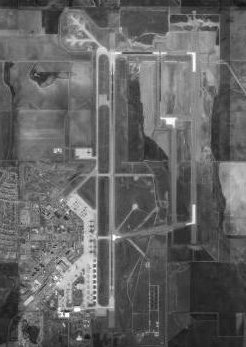
Satellite image of Altus AFB, February 17, 1995
