= Afton, Oklahoma =

- Town
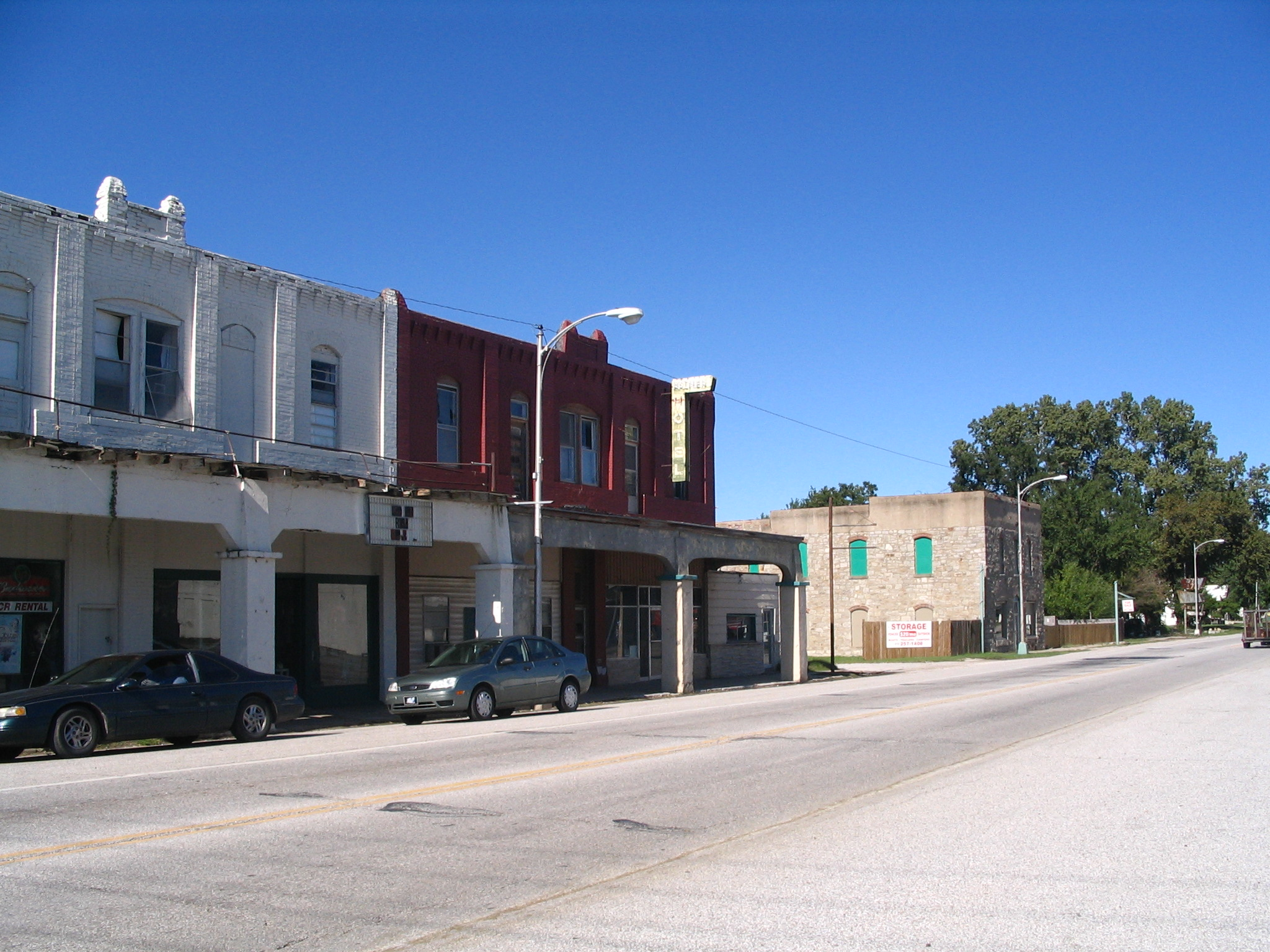
- View of Route 66 in downtown Afton, Oklahoma

- Location within Ottawa County and the state of Oklahoma
- Coordinates: 36°41′48″N 94°57′27″W
- Country: United States
- State: Oklahoma
- County: Ottawa

Area
  - Total: 2.08 sq mi (5.39 km^{2})
  - Land: 2.08 sq mi (5.39 km^{2})
  - Water: 0.00118 sq mi (0.00305 km^{2})
- Elevation: 784 ft (239 m)

Population (2020)
  - Total: 734
  - Density: 352.6/sq mi (136.15/km^{2})
- Time zone: UTC-6 (Central (CST))
  - Summer (DST): UTC-5 (CDT)
- ZIP code: 74331
- Area codes: 539/918
- FIPS code: 40-00600
- GNIS feature ID: 2412336
- Website: www.travelok.com/Afton

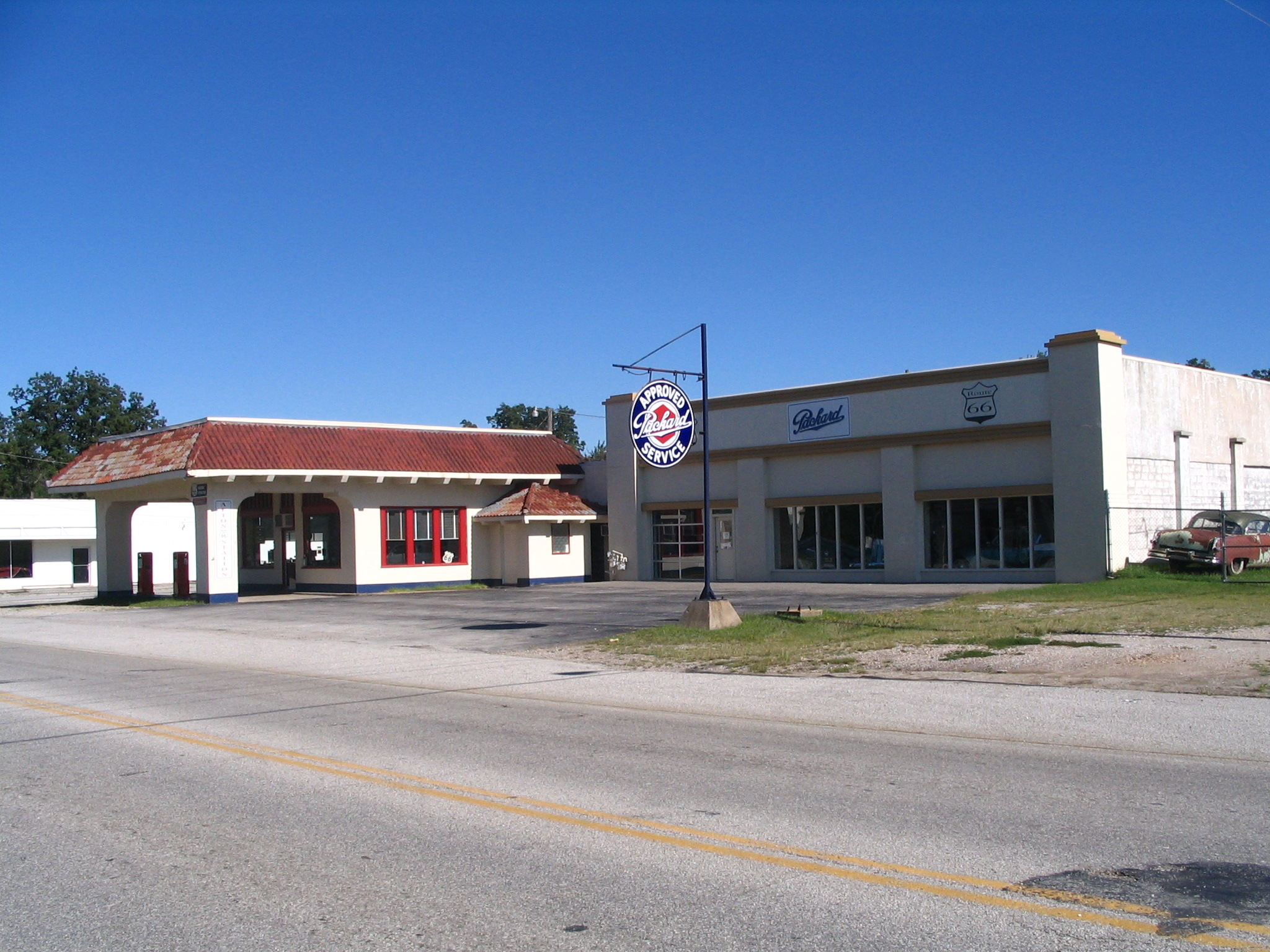
Afton Station, now a Packard museum and visitors center

Afton is a town in northeast Oklahoma in Ottawa County, Oklahoma, United States. The population was 734 at the time of the 2020 United States census.

== History ==
Afton developed in this part of the Cherokee Nation in Indian Territory after the Atlantic and Pacific Railroad (later the St. Louis and San Francisco Railway, or Frisco) built tracks through the area to Vinita in 1871. Regarding the town name, Oklahoma historian George Shirk states that a Scottish railroad surveyor, Anton Aires, named the town Afton after his daughter, while others have claimed the name comes from Robert Burns's poem, "Flow Gently Sweet Afton." In either case, Afton Aires' name and the Burns poem honor the River Afton in Scotland.

A post office was established in Afton during 1886. The 1900 census showed a population of 606. In 1901, the Kansas City, Fort Scott and Memphis Railroad, which soon became part of the Frisco system, constructed another line through the town, creating a shorter route to Kansas City, and causing another spurt of population growth. The town became a Frisco division point and shipping center for the surrounding agricultural area.{{efn/Agriculture mainly featured wheat, corn, hay and livestock.}} In 1910, Afton's population was 1,276; the town had two schools, a waterworks, two hotels, two banks, a brick and tile plant, a creamery, a newspaper, mills and grain elevators. The population peaked at 1,518 in 1920, but a depression after World War I caused a drop to 1,219 in 1930. Today there is a bank, a gas station, buffalo ranch, a pecan factory, a motel, a repair shop, and a dollar general.

== Geography ==
According to the United States Census Bureau, the town has a total area of 1.6 square miles (4.1 km^{2}), all land.

Originally a farming and railroad community, Afton is located on the historic Route 66. Route 66 was bypassed by I-44 in 1957. Businesses which formerly served US 66 travellers in the town's heyday included the Palmer Hotel, Rogers’ Motel, Rest Haven Motel, Green Acres Motel and Avon Motor Court, Baker's Cafe, Clint's Cafe, Smith Store and Barrett's Food Store, Mack's Place and Fred's 66 Bar.

There was a museum in a former D-X filling station, built in 1937 and restored in 1999 to house Packard and U.S. Route 66 memorabilia. The museum was closed and the building is now vacant. The Palmer Hotel building burned down in 2019.

== Demographics ==
Historical population
Census	Pop.	Note	%±
1900	606		—
1910	1,279		111.1%
1920	1,518		18.7%
1930	1,219		−19.7%
1940	1,261		3.4%
1950	1,252		−0.7%
1960	1,111		−11.3%
1970	1,022		−8.0%
1980	1,174		14.9%
1990	915		−22.1%
2000	1,118		22.2%
2010	1,049		−6.2%
2020	734		−30.0%
U.S. Decennial Census

Afton is part of the Joplin-Miami, MO-OK metropolitan area.

=== 2020 census ===
As of the 2020 census, Afton had a population of 734. The median age was 40.5 years. 23.4% of residents were under the age of 18 and 16.9% of residents were 65 years of age or older. For every 100 females there were 105.6 males, and for every 100 females age 18 and over there were 104.4 males age 18 and over.

0.0% of residents lived in urban areas, while 100.0% lived in rural areas.

There were 285 households in Afton, of which 30.2% had children under the age of 18 living in them. Of all households, 42.5% were married-couple households, 24.9% were households with a male householder and no spouse or partner present, and 26.7% were households with a female householder and no spouse or partner present. About 32.9% of all households were made up of individuals and 15.4% had someone living alone who was 65 years of age or older.

There were 393 housing units, of which 27.5% were vacant. The homeowner vacancy rate was 1.5% and the rental vacancy rate was 25.9%.

Racial composition as of the 2020 census
Race	Number	Percent
White	457	62.3%
Black or African American	2	0.3%
American Indian and Alaska Native	99	13.5%
Asian	1	0.1%
Native Hawaiian and Other Pacific Islander	1	0.1%
Some other race	6	0.8%
Two or more races	168	22.9%
Hispanic or Latino (of any race)	11	1.5%

=== 2010 census ===
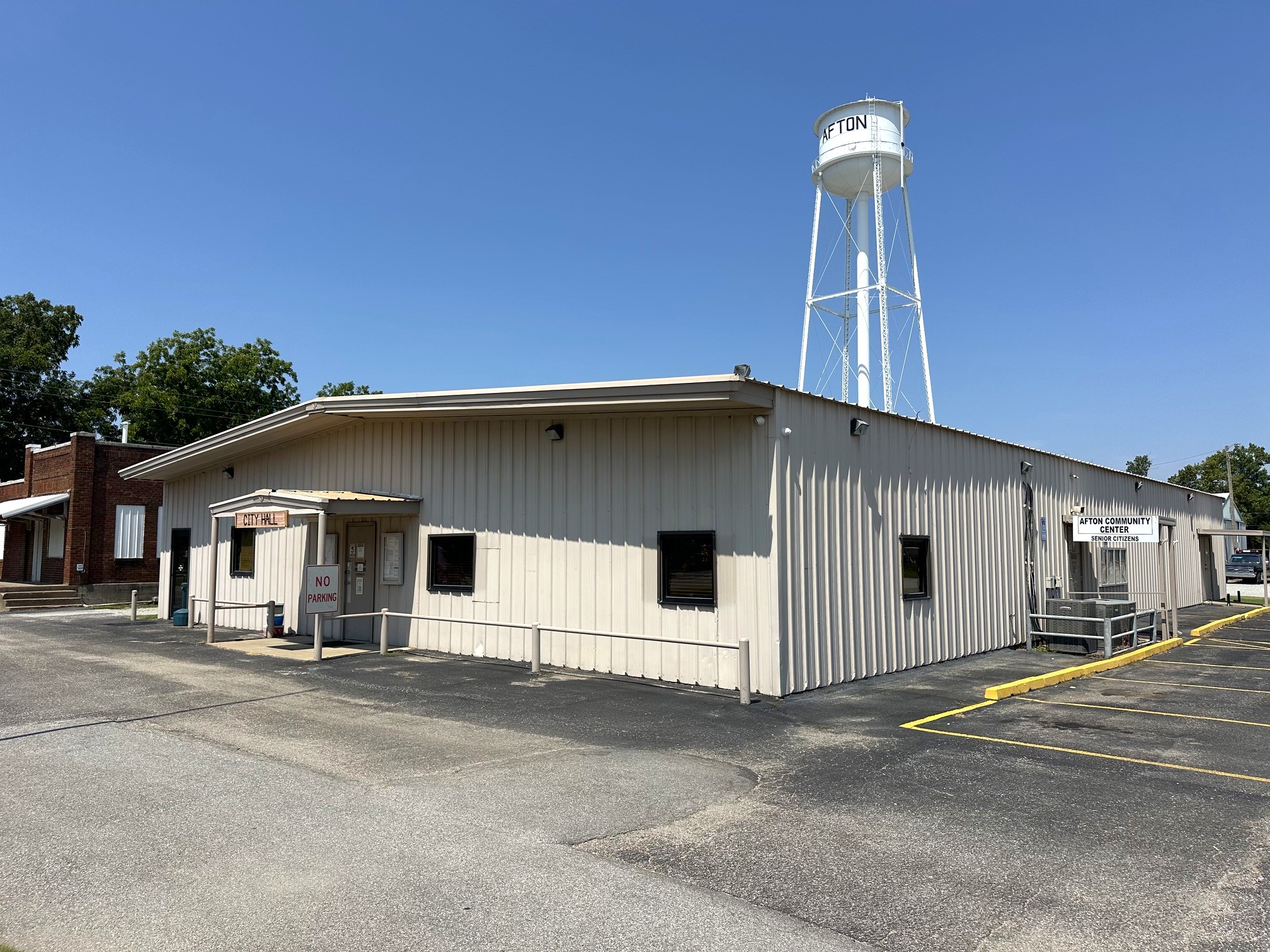
Afton City Hall in August of 2026

As of the census of 2010, there were 1,049 people living in the town. The population density was 620 inhabitants per square mile (240/km^{2}). There were 488 housing units at an average density of 307.7 per square mile (118.8/km^{2}). The racial makeup of the town was 77.46% White, 0.09% African American, 14.58% Native American, 0.09% Asian, and 7.78% from two or more races. Hispanic or Latino of any race were 1.70% of the population.

There were 441 households, out of which 33.3% had children under the age of 18 living with them, 51.9% were married couples living together, 10.9% had a female householder with no husband present, and 31.5% were non-families. 29.7% of all households were made up of individuals, and 15.6% had someone living alone who was 65 years of age or older. The average household size was 2.54 and the average family size was 3.11.

In the town, the population was spread out, with 29.5% under the age of 18, 7.6% from 18 to 24, 25.7% from 25 to 44, 20.2% from 45 to 64, and 17.0% who were 65 years of age or older. The median age was 36 years. For every 100 females, there were 94.8 males. For every 100 females age 18 and over, there were 93.6 males.

The median income for a household in the town was $21,964, and the median income for a family was $28,036. Males had a median income of $22,361 versus $16,964 for females. The per capita income for the town was $11,032. About 15.9% of families and 21.0% of the population were below the poverty line, including 32.6% of those under age 18 and 5.1% of those age 65 or over.

== Education ==
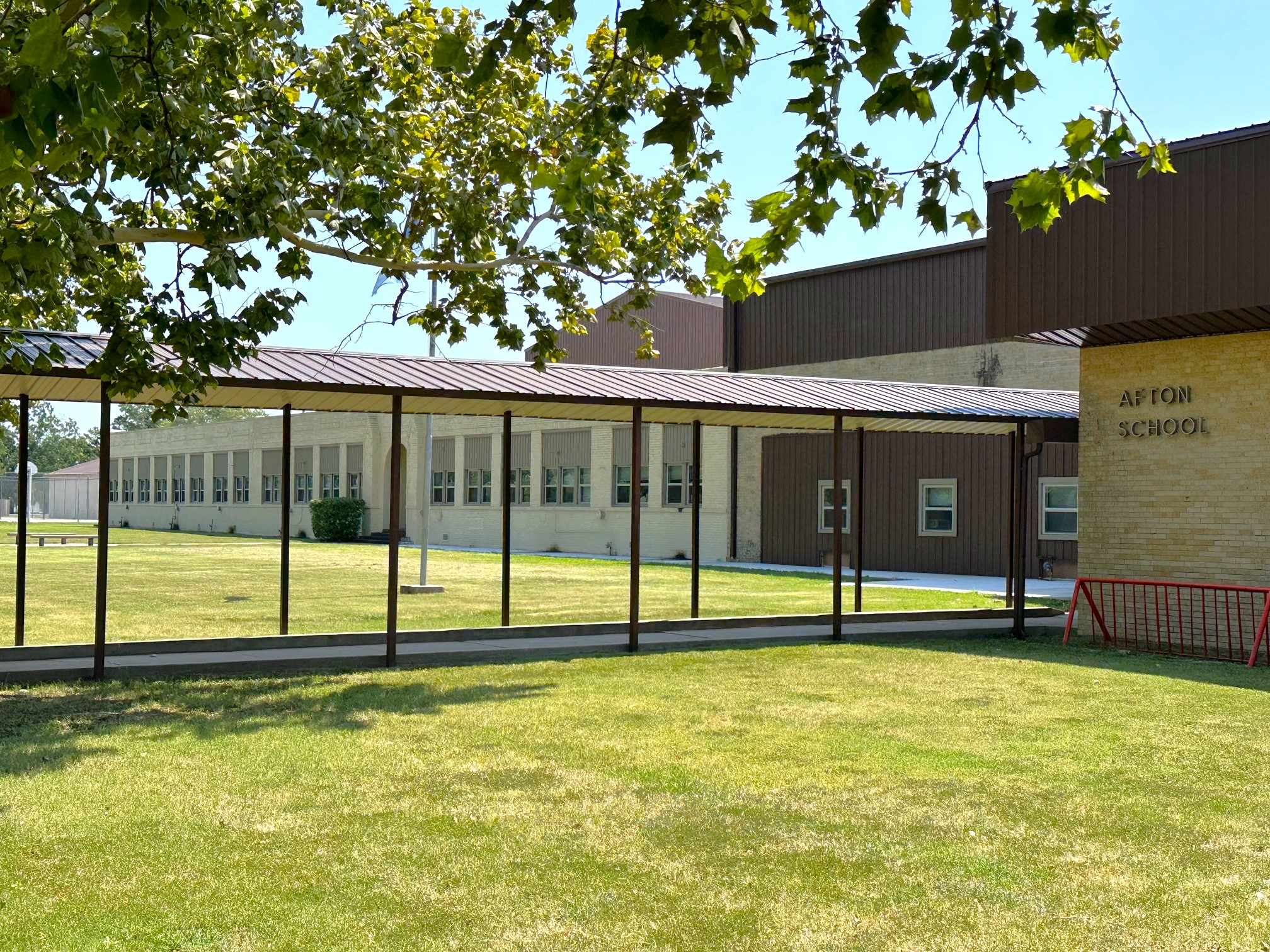
Afton School in August of 2026

Afton is served by the Afton Independent School District.

Northeast Tech operates one of its four campuses at 19901 S. Hwy 69; the Afton Campus serves approximately 500 students.

In 2017, the Afton High School Football team won, for the first time in school history, the Class A State Trophy.

In the 1970s the high school burned down; it was replaced with a new one.

== Culture ==
- The Darryl Starbird National Rod and Custom Hall of Fame Museum hosts an anniversary celebration in Afton, every June.

== Transportation ==
=== Highways ===
Afton sits at the junction of one Interstate Highway and three US Highways. A fourth US Highway previously ran through the area.

- I-44
- US 59
- US 60
- US 66 (former)
- US 69

=== Railroads ===
BNSF Railway runs through Afton on the town's north side as it roughly parallels 1st Street. Afton has two major subdivisions that operate through the town. The BNSF Cherokee Subdivision begins in Springfield, Missouri and ends at the BNSF Cherokee Yard in the city of Tulsa, Oklahoma. The BNSF Afton Subdivision begins at the wye to the northeast of town and runs north to just south of Fort Scott, Kansas, where it merges with, and becomes, the BNSF Fort Scott Subdivision into Kansas City, Missouri. It also used to house a CO-OP grain station, has been closed.

== National Register of Historic Places ==
- Cities Service Station (structure since removed or modified so heavily as to be unrecognizable)
- Horse Creek Bridge was modernized for the original bridge built in the 1930s was no longer able to bear the traffic.
