= 1987 NCAA women's gymnastics championships =

American college gymnastics competition

- Venue: Jon M. Huntsman Center
- Location: Salt Lake City, Utah
- Dates: April 24–25, 1987
- Teams: 12

Champions
- Women: Kelly Garrison-Steves, Oklahoma (38.150)
- Team: Georgia (1st)

The 1987 NCAA women's gymnastics championships were contested at the sixth annual tournament hosted by the NCAA to determine the individual and team national champions of women's gymnastics among its member programs in the United States.

A total of twelve teams competed for the championship, which took place from April 24–25 at the Jon M. Huntsman Center at the University of Utah in Salt Lake City, Utah.

Georgia won their first team national title, breaking the Utah Red Rocks' five-year NCAA Championship streak.

Kelly Garrison-Steves from Oklahoma won the individual all-around title.

== Team Results ==
Position	Team	Vault (gymnastics)	Uneven bars	Balance beam	Floor (gymnastics)	Total
1	Georgia Gym Dogs	46.900	46.950	47.400	46.650	187.900
2	Utah Red Rocks	47.050	47.250	46.450	46.800	187.550
3	UCLA Bruins	47.500	46.750	45.800	46.950	187.000
4	Alabama Crimson Tide	46.950	46.850	45.750	47.050	186.600
5	Arizona State Sun Devils	46.600	46.350	44.850	46.200	184.000
6	Florida Gators	46.500	46.850	44.050	46.400	183.800
7	LSU Tigers	46.750	45.050	43.600	46.100	181.500
8	Ohio State Buckeyes	46.200	45.200	43.700	45.100	180.200
9	Washington Huskies	44.800	46.050	43.600	45.400	179.850
10	Nebraska Cornhuskers	46.000	44.800	43.550	45.150	179.500
11	Arizona Wildcats	45.650	44.550	43.550	45.700	179.450
12	Oregon State Beavers	45.050	42.800	43.050	43.600	177.800

== Top Ten Individual All-Around Results ==
Position	Gymnast	Team	Vault (gymnastics)	Uneven bars	Balance beam	Floor (gymnastics)	Total
1	Kelly Garrison-Steves	University of Oklahoma	9.600	9.700	9.250	9.600	38.150
2	Yumi Mordre	University of Washington	9.500	9.500	9.450	9.400	37.850
3	Corrinne Wright	Georgia	9.450	9.400	9.300	9.650	37.800
4	Julie Estin	University of Alabama	9.400	9.400	9.450	9.450	37.700
4	Lynne Lederer	University of Utah	9.350	9.400	9.500	9.450	37.000
6	Melissa Miller	University of Florida	9.400	9.450	9.400	9.400	37.650
7	Cassie Frey	University of Oklahoma	9.400	9.600	9.300	9.250	37.550
8	Jill Andrews	UCLA	9.500	9.300	9.200	9.400	37.400
8	Julie Klick	Georgia	8.950	9.450	9.550	9.450	37.400
8	Lisa Pank	University of New Mexico	9.450	9.250	9.400	9.300	37.400

== Individual Event Finals Results ==
=== Vault ===
Rank	Name	Team	Vault Average
1	Yumi Mordre	University of Washington	9.500
2	Julie Sommers	Ohio State	9.475
3	Tanya Service	UCLA	9.400
4	Jill Andrews	UCLA	9.325
5	Amy Lucena	UCLA	9.300
6	Suzi Baldock	Arizona State	9.250
7	Kim Hamilton	UCLA	9.175
8	Jennifer Lyerly	LSU	9.125
9	Gina Banales	Georgia	9.025
10	Sonja Ahone	University of Utah	8.900

=== Uneven Bars ===
Rank	Name	Team	Score
1	Lucy Wener	Georgia	9.70
2	Marie Roethlisberger	University of Minnesota	9.650
3	Brigit Shier	UCLA	9.600
4	Yumi Mordre	University of Washington	9.500
5	Marie Robbins	University of Alabama	9.450
5	Cassie Frey	University of Oklahoma	9.450
7	Cheryl Weatherstone	University of Utah	9.300
8	Kelly Garrison-Steves	University of Oklahoma	9.050
9	Suzi Baldock	Arizona State	8.850
10	Kris Takahashi	University of Utah	8.350

=== Balance Beam ===
Rank	Name	Team	Score
1	Yumi Mordre	University of Washington	9.650
2	Terry Eckert	Georgia	9.600
3	Andrea Thomas	Georgia	9.500
4	Julie Estin	University of Alabama	9.400
4	Karli Urban	Arizona State	9.400
6	Caroline Wood	University of Arizona	9.350
6	Lynne Lederer	University of Utah	9.350
6	Lisa Pank	University of New Mexico	9.350
6	Kris Takahashi	University of Utah	9.350
10	Julie Klick	Georgia	9.300
11	Melissa Miller	University of Florida	8.750

=== Floor Exercise ===
Rank	Name	Team	Score
1	Kim Hamilton	UCLA	9.800
2	Corrinne Wright	Georgia	9.700
3	Lynne Lederer	University of Utah	9.600
3	Marie Robbins	University of Alabama	9.600
5	Tanya Service	UCLA	9.550
6	Jill Stuart	University of Utah	9.500
7	Julie Estin	University of Alabama	8.850
7	Julie Klick	Georgia	8.850
9	Cheri Way	University of Alabama	8.350

== See also ==
- 1987 NCAA men's gymnastics championships
