= Stringtown School District (Oklahoma) =

School district in Oklahoma

Location
- 304 Highland St, Stringtown, Oklahoma, Oklahoma District 7 United States
- Coordinates: 34.4668°N 96.0513°W

District information
- Type: Public,
- Grades: PK - 12
- Established: Pre Statehood
- Superintendent: Tony Potts
- Budget: $2,016,000

Students and staff
- Students: 374
- Teachers: 18
- Staff: 28

Other information
- Website: stringtown.k12.ok.us

Stringtown High School

Location
- 103 Tiger Drive; Stringtown, (Atoka County), Oklahoma 74569; United States

Information
- Type: Public high school
- Principal: Chad Gragg
- Staff: 4.50 (FTE)
- Enrollment: 82 (2023-24)
- Student to teacher ratio: 18.22
- Colors: Blue and gold
- Nickname: Tigers
- Website: Stringtown High School

Stringtown School District is a school district located in Atoka County Oklahoma. It is public school district in the town of Stringtown, Oklahoma that consists of two schools, an elementary school and a high school/junior high. The high school and junior high are located in the same building. The schools share the same cafeteria located between the schools.

It includes Stringtown. The district also receives high school students who graduated from the K-8 school district Lane Public School, which includes the communities of Lane and Farris.
