= Lane Public School =

School district in Oklahoma, United States

Lane Independent School District No. C-22, operating as Lane Public School, is a school district, consisting of a single K-8 school, headquartered in Lane, Oklahoma.

It includes the majority of the Lane census-designated place. The district also includes the unincorporated area of Farris.

Students above the eighth grade who graduated from the Lane School on most occasions select Atoka High School in (of Atoka Public Schools) or Stringtown high school (of Stringtown School District).

== History ==
The Lane School first opened in 1905.

At one point Jack Humphrey was superintendent. The Oklahoma State Auditor and Inspector stated that he took possession of items donated to Lane School and used them for other purposes. Humphrey resigned as a result of the state report.

In 2002, Strickland left his position at the Inola Public Schools school district, and became the superintendent of the Lane district. In 2003 Strickland was indicted for embezzling funds from the Inola school district. The Lane board of trustees gave Strickland a paid suspension. That year, Strickland pleaded guilty to criminal charges. As part of the penalty, he would no longer be able to be licensed to be a school administrator, nor to teach.

In light of the Strickland and Humphrey scandals, a group of 50 people from the area advocated for Drew Edmondson, the Attorney General of Oklahoma, to take the board members responsible for superintendent hiring decisions off of the Lane school board.

In 2008, the administration of Farris Public School sought a merger into the Lane school district.

In 2013, the Farris school district closed and merged into the Lane school district. After the consolidation, Lane's enrollment increased by around 50 students.
