= Big Cabin School District =

School district in Oklahoma, United States

Location
- Big Cabin, Oklahoma; United States

Big Cabin School District was a school district headquartered in Big Cabin, Oklahoma.

The district territory includes parts of the following counties: Craig, Mayes, and Rogers.

== History ==
In 1958 there was a bond proposal to spend $65,000 for a replacement school facility. The proposed facility would be for all grade levels.

=== Closure ===
In the period circa 1986–1991, the district had seven superintendents. The Oklahoma Department of Education, for the 1991–1992 school year, stated that the district was on an accreditation warning. A group of parents were advocating for allowing their children to be sent to other school districts. In the 1991–1992 school year, the number of students enrolled fell below 100. In fall 1991 more than 50% of the people living in the Big Cabin district chose to send their children to other schools.

The Oklahoma Department of Education told the Big Cabin administration that they recommended a dissolution. The district voted to end its own operations in fall 1991, effective at the end of the 1991–1992 school year.

By December 1991 three school districts expressed interest in taking over the Big Cabin district: Adair Public Schools, White Oak Public Schools, and Vinita Public Schools. Virgil Black, a district judge of Oklahoma, ruled that there would be subsequent elections for the Big Cabin district residents to decide which district to be annexed into, instead of having voters choose from the three districts on a single occasion. Black stated that he would not have ruled that way if he had the choice, but he felt that he was required to under Oklahoma law. In December 1991, Black decided that the first election scheduled would be for the White Oak merger proposal.

In January 1992 residents turned down a proposal to merge the district into the Adair school district. According to results (which were not yet ruled official) available as of January 3, 1992, 230 voters were against the Adair merger while 223 were in favor.

Voters additionally rejected another proposal to merge with the White Oak school district. By March 1992 the White Oak district had spent $16,219 to pay two legal companies in an effort to obtain the Big Cabin district.

In May 1992 residents of the Big Cabin school district approved a referendum to join the Vinita school district. According to results (which were not yet ruled official) available as of May 7, 1992, 224 voters were in favor of the Vinita merger while 187 voters were against.
