= Battiest, Oklahoma =

- Unincorporated community
- Location within Oklahoma Location within the United States
- Coordinates: 34°23′36″N 94°55′30″W
- Country: United States
- State: Oklahoma
- County: McCurtain
- Time zone: UTC-6 (Central (CST))
  - Summer (DST): UTC-5 (CDT)
- ZIP code: 74722

Battiest /bəˈtiːst/ is an unincorporated community in McCurtain County, Oklahoma, United States.

== History ==
The village was named for Choctaw jurist Byington Battiest. The post office was established November 1, 1926. Battiest is served by the Battiest Independent School District.

== Climate ==
According to the Köppen Climate Classification system, Battiest has a humid subtropical climate, abbreviated "Cfa" on climate maps. The hottest temperature recorded in Battiest was 113 °F (45.0 °C) on August 4,2011, while the coldest temperature recorded was −14 °F (−25.6 °C) on February 16–17, 2021.

Climate data for Battiest, Oklahoma, 1991–2020 normals, extremes 1985–present
Month	Jan	Feb	Mar	Apr	May	Jun	Jul	Aug	Sep	Oct	Nov	Dec	Year
Record high °F (°C)	77 (25)	84 (29)	89 (32)	94 (34)	94 (34)	108 (42)	109 (43)	113 (45)	106 (41)	92 (33)	85 (29)	80 (27)	113 (45)
Mean maximum °F (°C)	69.8 (21.0)	73.7 (23.2)	80.7 (27.1)	84.6 (29.2)	87.4 (30.8)	92.2 (33.4)	98.3 (36.8)	98.5 (36.9)	94.0 (34.4)	86.3 (30.2)	77.3 (25.2)	70.6 (21.4)	100.4 (38.0)
Mean daily maximum °F (°C)	51.7 (10.9)	56.2 (13.4)	64.2 (17.9)	72.7 (22.6)	78.8 (26.0)	86.3 (30.2)	91.3 (32.9)	91.5 (33.1)	84.8 (29.3)	73.9 (23.3)	62.3 (16.8)	53.8 (12.1)	72.3 (22.4)
Daily mean °F (°C)	39.1 (3.9)	43.0 (6.1)	50.6 (10.3)	58.7 (14.8)	67.3 (19.6)	75.0 (23.9)	79.2 (26.2)	78.6 (25.9)	71.7 (22.1)	60.4 (15.8)	49.1 (9.5)	41.5 (5.3)	59.5 (15.3)
Mean daily minimum °F (°C)	26.5 (−3.1)	29.8 (−1.2)	36.9 (2.7)	44.7 (7.1)	55.9 (13.3)	63.7 (17.6)	67.2 (19.6)	65.7 (18.7)	58.5 (14.7)	46.9 (8.3)	36.0 (2.2)	29.1 (−1.6)	46.7 (8.2)
Mean minimum °F (°C)	10.9 (−11.7)	15.4 (−9.2)	19.5 (−6.9)	28.8 (−1.8)	38.7 (3.7)	52.3 (11.3)	59.0 (15.0)	56.1 (13.4)	43.5 (6.4)	29.5 (−1.4)	20.3 (−6.5)	14.9 (−9.5)	7.8 (−13.4)
Record low °F (°C)	−2 (−19)	−14 (−26)	4 (−16)	22 (−6)	30 (−1)	44 (7)	50 (10)	46 (8)	32 (0)	19 (−7)	11 (−12)	−4 (−20)	−14 (−26)
Average precipitation inches (mm)	3.71 (94)	3.71 (94)	5.15 (131)	5.56 (141)	6.66 (169)	4.76 (121)	4.29 (109)	3.83 (97)	5.00 (127)	5.27 (134)	4.59 (117)	5.13 (130)	57.66 (1,464)
Average snowfall inches (cm)	1.0 (2.5)	1.1 (2.8)	0.5 (1.3)	0.0 (0.0)	0.0 (0.0)	0.0 (0.0)	0.0 (0.0)	0.0 (0.0)	0.0 (0.0)	0.0 (0.0)	0.0 (0.0)	0.3 (0.76)	2.9 (7.36)
Average precipitation days (≥ 0.01 in)	8.6	9.4	9.6	8.9	10.2	8.3	7.3	7.1	7.1	8.2	8.5	8.7	101.9
Average snowy days (≥ 0.1 in)	0.7	0.9	0.3	0.0	0.0	0.0	0.0	0.0	0.0	0.0	0.1	0.4	2.4
Source 1: NOAA
Source 2: National Weather Service

== Sources ==
- Shirk, George H. Oklahoma Place Names. Norman: University of Oklahoma Press, 1987. ISBN 0-8061-2028-2 .
