= Vinita Public Schools =

School district in Oklahoma

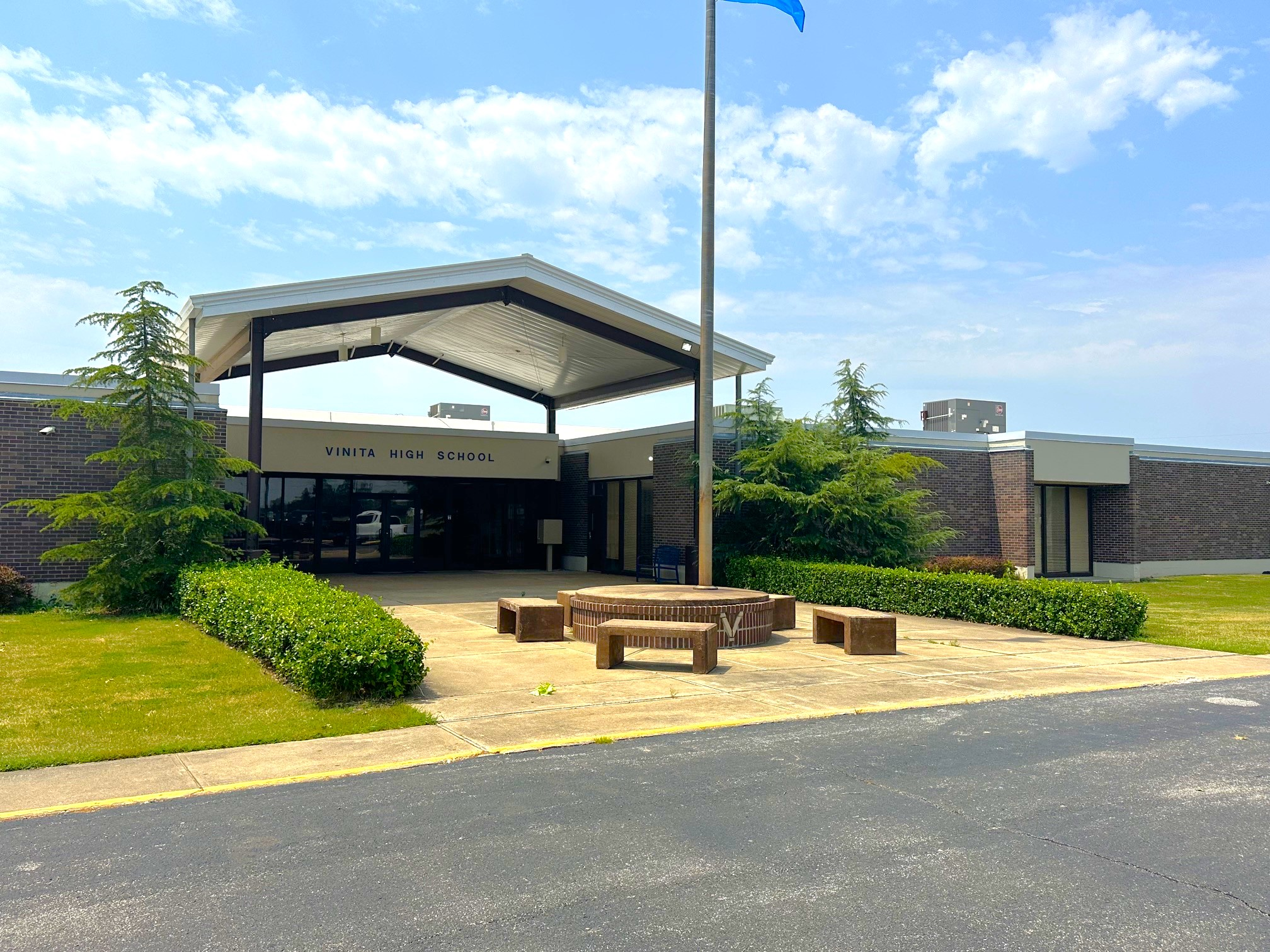
Vinita High School in August of 2026

Vinita Public Schools is a public school district headquartered in Vinita, Oklahoma that serves the Craig and Mayes counties—including most of the city of Vinita—in northeastern Oklahoma. The district manages four schools: Vinita High School (801 N. Adair St.), Ewing Halsell Middle School (226 N Miller St.), Hall-Halsell Elementary (402 W. Clyde Ave.), and Will Rogers Elementary School (101 S Smith St.).

Vinita Public Schools also receives high school students from the nearby White Oak Public Schools district, which has sent its secondary-level students to Vinita High School since the fall of 2010. The district also includes the community of Big Cabin.

== History ==
Vinita Public Schools has expanded over time through consolidation and cooperative arrangements with nearby districts. In 1992, voters in the Big Cabin School District approved a referendum to annex their district into Vinita Public Schools after Big Cabin had voted to discontinue its own school operations in 1991. This consolidation increased the district’s geographic coverage and student population.

In the early 21st century, regional changes in enrollment and school funding led to additional collaboration among school systems in Craig County. One such arrangement involved White Oak Public Schools, which began sending its high school students to Vinita High School starting with the 2010–2011 academic year.

In 2019, Vinita Public Schools became the first school system in Oklahoma to transfer land to a Native American nation, the Cherokee Nation. The land is connected to the shuttered and defunct Attucks School.

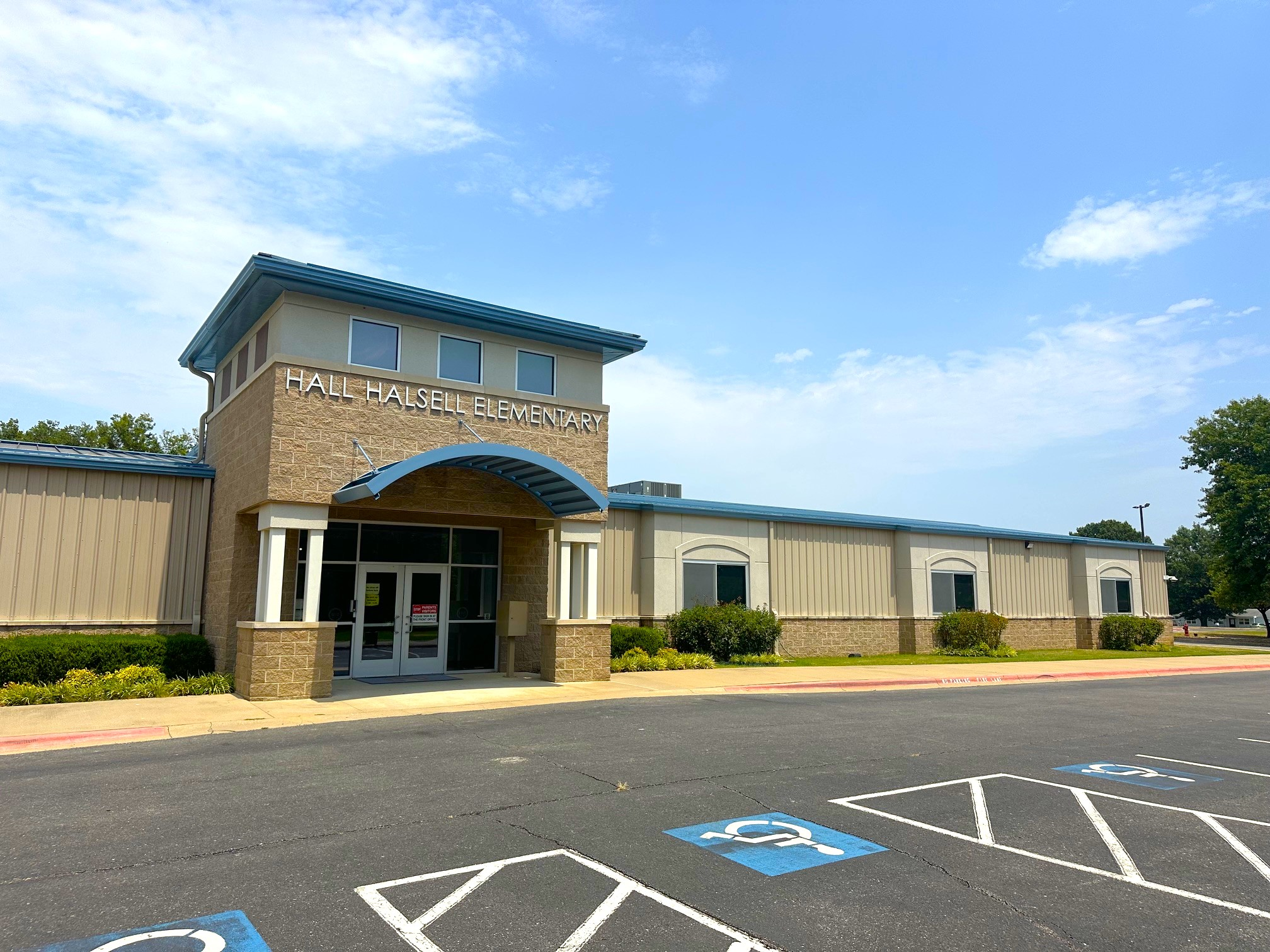
Hall Hasell Elementary in Vinita, 8-2026

== Schools ==
- Hall-Halsell Lower Elementary
- Will Rogers Elementary
- Ewing Halsell Middle School
- Vinita High School

== See also ==
Other Craig County School Systems:

- Bluejacket Public Schools
- Ketchum Public Schools
- Welch Public Schools
- White Oak Public Schools
