= Lane, Oklahoma =

Unincorporated community in Oklahoma, US

- Census-designated place
- Location within the state of Oklahoma
- Coordinates: 34°17′59″N 95°59′22″W
- Country: United States
- State: Oklahoma
- County: Atoka

Area
  - Total: 7.99 sq mi (20.69 km^{2})
  - Land: 7.95 sq mi (20.60 km^{2})
  - Water: 0.035 sq mi (0.09 km^{2})
- Elevation: 581 ft (177 m)

Population (2020)
  - Total: 300
  - Density: 37.7/sq mi (14.57/km^{2})
- Time zone: UTC-6 (Central (CST))
  - Summer (DST): UTC-5 (CDT)
- FIPS code: 40-41400
- GNIS feature ID: 2629925

Lane is an unincorporated community and census-designated place in Atoka County, Oklahoma, United States.

A post office was established at Lane, Indian Territory on October 6, 1902. Its name reflects the fact the new post office was located in a building which was at the end of lane bounded by rail fencing. At the time of its founding, Lane was located in Atoka County, Choctaw Nation, a territorial-era government unit.

The population was 300 as of the 2020 Census.

Lane is located along the State Highway 3, 10 miles (16 km) southeast of Atoka.

McGee Creek Reservoir, which impounds the waters of McGee Creek, lies northeast of Lane. McGee Creek is a tributary of Muddy Boggy Creek, which flows east of Lane.

The famous rodeo world champion Lane Frost (1963-1989) once lived in Lane, as do his parents. Frost graduated from high school in Atoka.

== Demographics ==
Historical population
Census	Pop.	Note	%±
2020	300		—
U.S. Decennial Census

=== 2020 census ===
As of the 2020 census, Lane had a population of 300. The median age was 48.0 years. 20.3% of residents were under the age of 18 and 27.3% of residents were 65 years of age or older. For every 100 females there were 109.8 males, and for every 100 females age 18 and over there were 99.2 males age 18 and over.

0.0% of residents lived in urban areas, while 100.0% lived in rural areas.

There were 131 households in Lane, of which 26.0% had children under the age of 18 living in them. Of all households, 37.4% were married-couple households, 26.7% were households with a male householder and no spouse or partner present, and 26.0% were households with a female householder and no spouse or partner present. About 28.3% of all households were made up of individuals and 11.5% had someone living alone who was 65 years of age or older.

There were 167 housing units, of which 21.6% were vacant. The homeowner vacancy rate was 0.0% and the rental vacancy rate was 10.0%.

Racial composition as of the 2020 census
Race	Number	Percent
White	225	75.0%
Black or African American	1	0.3%
American Indian and Alaska Native	37	12.3%
Asian	0	0.0%
Native Hawaiian and Other Pacific Islander	0	0.0%
Some other race	3	1.0%
Two or more races	34	11.3%
Hispanic or Latino (of any race)	17	5.7%

== Education ==
Almost all of the census-designated place is in the Lane Public School elementary school district. A portion in the northwest is in the Harmony Public School school district.

The Lane School first opened in 1905.

Students above the eighth grade who graduated from the Lane School on most occasions select Atoka High School in (of Atoka Public Schools) or Stringtown high school (of Stringtown School District).
