= Alex, Oklahoma =

- Town
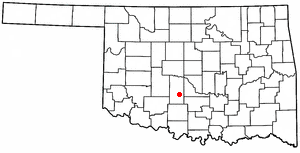
- Location of Alex, Oklahoma
- Coordinates: 34°55′22″N 97°46′35″W
- Country: United States
- State: Oklahoma
- County: Grady

Area
  - Total: 6.65 sq mi (17.22 km^{2})
  - Land: 6.65 sq mi (17.22 km^{2})
  - Water: 0 sq mi (0.00 km^{2})
- Elevation: 1,020 ft (310 m)

Population (2020)
  - Total: 482
  - Density: 73/sq mi (28/km^{2})
- Time zone: UTC-6 (Central (CST))
  - Summer (DST): UTC-5 (CDT)
- ZIP code: 73002
- Area code: 405
- FIPS code: 40-01250
- GNIS feature ID: 2412347
- Website: townofalexok.net

Alex is a town in Grady County, Oklahoma, United States. The population was 482 at the 2020 census.

== History ==
The town, now locally pronounced Elik, bears the name of an early settler, an intermarried Chickasaw, named William Vinson Alexander whose wife, Martha, served as the first postmistress, after the post office was established in Alexander's store in December 1885. Alexander established the First State Bank on October 3, 1907.

Alex was almost destroyed on July 7, 1906, when a tornado hit the town. The business district was mostly rebuilt a year later, with a drug store, a variety store and three general stores. The Alex Tribune newspaper was first published in 1907 and continued in business until the 1940s. The town incorporated in 1910.

== Geography ==
According to the United States Census Bureau, the town has a total area of 6.7 square miles (17 km^{2}), all land. It lies 10 miles (16 km) south of Chickasha.

== Demographics ==
Historical population
Census	Pop.	Note	%±
1920	478		—
1930	598		25.1%
1940	544		−9.0%
1950	563		3.5%
1960	545		−3.2%
1970	492		−9.7%
1980	769		56.3%
1990	639		−16.9%
2000	635		−0.6%
2010	550		−13.4%
2020	482		−12.4%
U.S. Decennial Census

=== 2020 census ===
As of the 2020 census, Alex had a population of 482. The median age was 35.4 years. 25.3% of residents were under the age of 18 and 14.5% of residents were 65 years of age or older. For every 100 females there were 92.8 males, and for every 100 females age 18 and over there were 94.6 males age 18 and over.

0.0% of residents lived in urban areas, while 100.0% lived in rural areas.

There were 192 households in Alex, of which 37.5% had children under the age of 18 living in them. Of all households, 50.0% were married-couple households, 15.1% were households with a male householder and no spouse or partner present, and 27.6% were households with a female householder and no spouse or partner present. About 25.5% of all households were made up of individuals and 13.0% had someone living alone who was 65 years of age or older.

There were 237 housing units, of which 19.0% were vacant. The homeowner vacancy rate was 1.5% and the rental vacancy rate was 8.8%.

Racial composition as of the 2020 census
Race	Number	Percent
White	387	80.3%
Black or African American	0	0.0%
American Indian and Alaska Native	37	7.7%
Asian	0	0.0%
Native Hawaiian and Other Pacific Islander	0	0.0%
Some other race	20	4.1%
Two or more races	38	7.9%
Hispanic or Latino (of any race)	30	6.2%

=== 2010 census ===
As of the census of 2010, there were 550 people living in the town. The population density was 82 inhabitants per square mile (32/km^{2}). There were 289 housing units at an average density of 42 per square mile (16/km^{2}). The racial makeup of the town was 91.18% White, 6.30% Native American, 0.16% Asian, 0.79% from other races, and 1.57% from two or more races. Hispanic or Latino of any race were 1.89% of the population.

There were 254 households, out of which 29.9% had children under the age of 18 living with them, 56.3% were married couples living together, 11.8% had a female householder with no husband present, and 29.5% were non-families. 26.4% of all households were made up of individuals, and 14.2% had someone living alone who was 65 years of age or older. The average household size was 2.50 and the average family size was 2.97.

In the town, the population was spread out, with 27.2% under the age of 18, 8.2% from 18 to 24, 24.6% from 25 to 44, 22.7% from 45 to 64, and 17.3% who were 65 years of age or older. The median age was 38 years. For every 100 females, there were 99.7 males. For every 100 females age 18 and over, there were 88.6 males.

The median income for a household in the town was $27,353, and the median income for a family was $31,364. Males had a median income of $29,750 versus $21,563 for females. The per capita income for the town was $13,455. About 15.1% of families and 18.5% of the population were below the poverty line, including 18.7% of those under age 18 and 10.1% of those age 65 or over.

== Economy ==
Alex is primarily a farm community. The main crops are wheat and alfalfa. Livestock raising is also important.
