= Balko, Oklahoma =

Unincorporated community in Oklahoma, US

- Unincorporated community
- Location within the state of Oklahoma Balko, Oklahoma (the United States)
- Coordinates: 36.6164°N 100.6861°W
- Country: United States
- State: Oklahoma
- County: Beaver

Population (2000)
  - Total: 623
- Time zone: UTC-6 (Central (CST))
  - Summer (DST): UTC-5 (CDT)
- ZIP codes: 73931

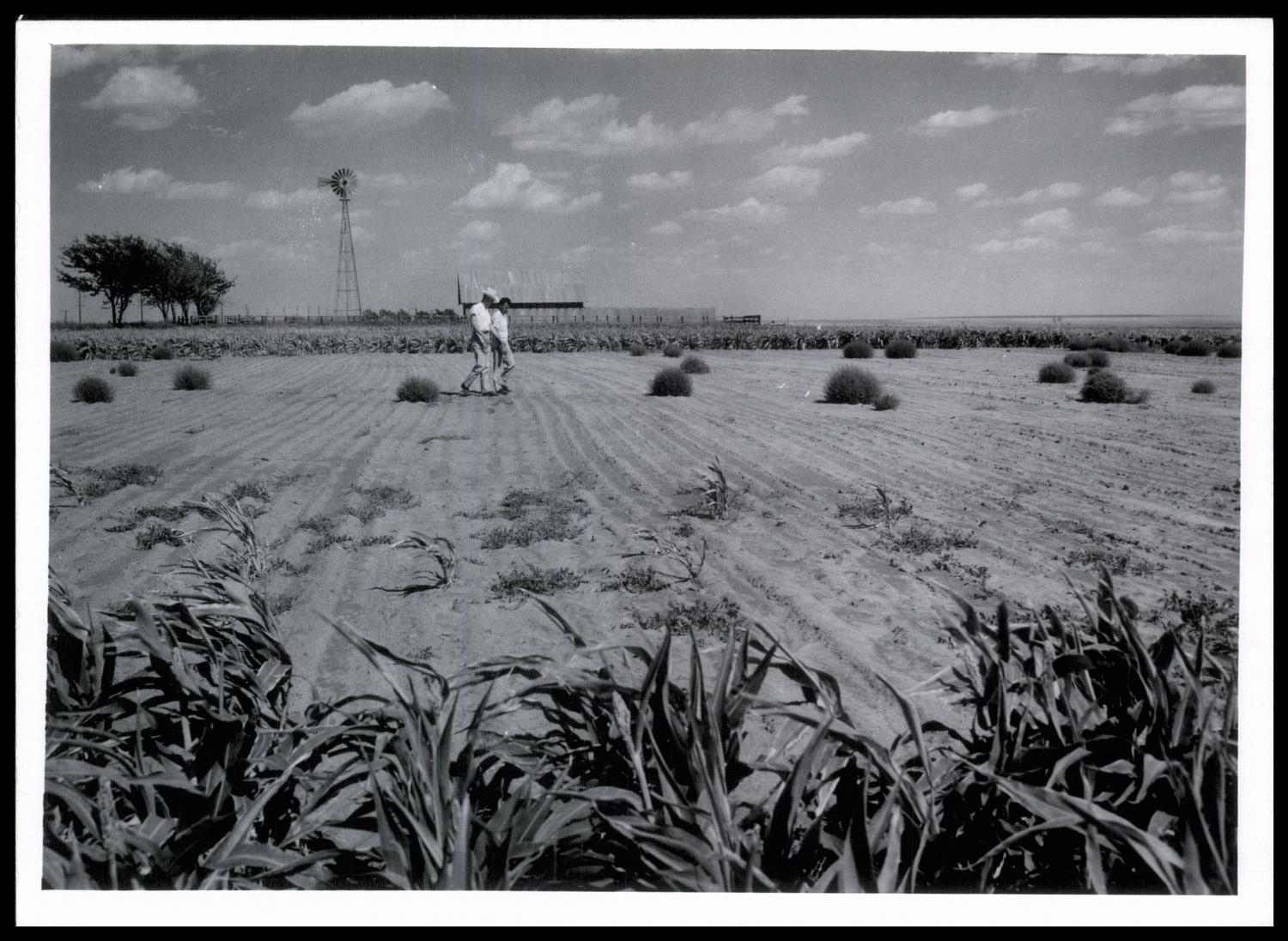
Grain field under treatment for weeds, 1955

Balko is an unincorporated community in Beaver County, Oklahoma, United States. The population in 2020 was 473.

== History ==
The post office was established March 14, 1904.

On February 19, 2026, a wildfire burning along U.S. Route 412 threatened Balko, which was included in an evacuation order. Lieutenant Governor Matt Pinnell wrote on social media that structures were burning and asked for prayers for Balko.

== Economy and facilities ==
Balko has a K–12 public school, post office, gas station, diner, tire shop, and three churches. The local economy is dependent on farming, ranching, and the oil industry.

== Geography ==
Balko is located in the Oklahoma Panhandle, along U.S. Route 412, east of U.S. Route 83 and west of U.S. Route 270.

The nearest airport is Beaver Municipal, about 21 miles northeast. The nearest commercial airport is Liberal Mid-America Regional in Kansas, about 42 miles north-northwest.

=== Climate ===
Climate data for Balko, Oklahoma
Month	Jan	Feb	Mar	Apr	May	Jun	Jul	Aug	Sep	Oct	Nov	Dec	Year
Mean daily maximum °F (°C)	46.7 (8.2)	51 (11)	59.5 (15.3)	70.6 (21.4)	78.1 (25.6)	87.4 (30.8)	93.5 (34.2)	91.4 (33.0)	82.9 (28.3)	73 (23)	58.7 (14.8)	48.3 (9.1)	70.1 (21.2)
Mean daily minimum °F (°C)	17.4 (−8.1)	23 (−5)	30.6 (−0.8)	40.5 (4.7)	50.6 (10.3)	59.5 (15.3)	65.4 (18.6)	63.6 (17.6)	55.7 (13.2)	43 (6)	31.1 (−0.5)	20.5 (−6.4)	41.7 (5.4)
Average precipitation inches (mm)	0.4 (10)	0.7 (18)	1.3 (33)	1.3 (33)	3.3 (84)	3.3 (84)	2.4 (61)	2.4 (61)	1.8 (46)	1.1 (28)	1.1 (28)	0.5 (13)	19.5 (500)
Source: Weatherbase.com
