= White Oak Public Schools =

School district in Oklahoma, United States

White Oak Public Schools is a school district headquartered in White Oak, Oklahoma, United States. It operates a single PreK-8 school, White Oak Public School. While the district has jurisdiction over grades K-12, it sends high school students to Vinita Public Schools and only educates Pre-Kindergarten through grade 8 in-house. The district includes the census-designated place of White Oak, and small portions of Vinita along some roads. The community of Estella, as of 1938, sent high school students to the White Oak High School.

== History ==
The district was previously operating all grades K-12. A facility built in 1926 was destroyed by a 1942 fire. The current school facility opened in 1943.

In the 1991–1992 school year, White Oak was one of three school districts attempting to acquire the Big Cabin School District, which was closing. By March 1992 the White Oak district had spent $16,219 to pay two legal companies in an effort to obtain the Big Cabin district. Voters in the Big Cabin district rejected the merger with White Oak, and instead chose the Vinita school district.

Several years prior to 2009, there were 197 students in the White Oak district. By 2009 the amount of money given by the Oklahoma state government had declined, and that year, the student count was 125. In 2010, an election was to be held on whether the district was to continue having high school classes. The electorate decided to end high school education effective spring 2010. The elementary school and middle school continue to operate while the old high school building is abandoned. The high school campus contains two basketball gyms, the main gym named Carl Horner gymnasium, and an old gym connected to the school. The only remnants of the football field is the concession stand.

In 2010 the school district had 51 students in the physical school building, but its official enrollment was 970, due to it counting students in Oklahoma Virtual Academy, a virtual school operated by the company K12, which the district partnered with. To take Oklahoma state accountability tests, the virtual students traveled to the White Oak area, stayed in a hotel, and took the tests on the school site. The Oklahoma State Board of Education, circa 2010, considered the use of the virtual school and voted three times on whether to accredit White Oak; the first vote was against accreditation, the second only accredited the in-person students, and the third accredited the entire district. Four board members voted for the third outcome while three voted against. That year, the editorial board of The Oklahoman argued that the state education board should continue to examine the school district's practice of contracting education to a virtual private school.
