= Afton Public Schools =

School district in Oklahoma, U.S.

Location
- Afton, Oklahoma Midwestern United States United States

District information
- Type: Public
- Motto: It's a great day to be an eagle
- Grades: pre-k to twelfth grade
- Established: 1934 (original high school/modern middle and elementary school) 1970s (modern high school)

Students and staff
- Students: 407 (as of 2024)
- Teachers: 12
- Colors: orange and black

Other information

The Afton Independent School District or Afton Public Schools is a school district based in Afton, Oklahoma (United States).

It includes the communities of Afton and Narcissa in Ottawa County, a section of Bernice in Delaware County, and a section of Craig County. It first opened in the year 1934. In the 1970s the high school moved to a new building. The old high school building was repurposed as a middle school. A section for elementary school was also added.

== See also ==
- List of school districts in Oklahoma
