= National Register of Historic Places listings in Craig County, Oklahoma =

Location of Craig County in Oklahoma

This is a list of the National Register of Historic Places listings in Craig County, Oklahoma.

This is a complete list of the properties on the National Register of Historic Places in Craig County, Oklahoma, United States. The locations of National Register properties with latitude and longitude coordinates provided below can be viewed on a map.

There are 11 properties listed on the National Register in the county.

This National Park Service list is complete through NPS recent listings posted July 31, 2026.

== Current listings ==
	Name on the Register	Image	Date listed	Location	City or town	Description
1	John and Hazel Adams House	John and Hazel Adams House	December 27, 2023 (#100009662)	108 Fairmont Road; 36°38′32″N 95°10′28″W	Vinita	
2	Attucks School	Attucks School	December 3, 2009 (#09000974)	346 S. 4th 36°37′55″N 95°09′04″W	Vinita	
3	Carselowey House	Carselowey House	December 7, 2011 (#11000894)	403 N. Gunter St. 36°38′46″N 95°09′29″W	Vinita	
4	Craig County Courthouse	Craig County Courthouse	August 23, 1984 (#84002994)	214 W. Canadian Ave. 36°38′14″N 95°09′28″W	Vinita	No longer extant per Google Street View.
5	First Methodist-Episcopal Church, South	First Methodist-Episcopal Church, South	June 3, 1999 (#99000673)	314 W. Canadian Ave. 36°38′17″N 95°09′29″W	Vinita	
6	Hotel Vinita	Hotel Vinita	February 9, 1995 (#94001608)	Southwestern corner of the junction of Canadian and Wilson Sts. 36°38′12″N 95°09′20″W	Vinita	
7	Little Cabin Creek Bridge	Little Cabin Creek Bridge	March 4, 2009 (#09000072)	U.S. Routes 60/69 over Little Cabin Creek, southeast of their junction with Interstate 44; 36°37′36″N 95°07′13″W	Vinita	
8	McDougal Filling Station	McDougal Filling Station	May 27, 2004 (#04000521)	443956 E. Highway 60; 36°37′38″N 95°05′22″W	Vinita	
9	Randall Tire Company	Randall Tire Company	February 23, 1995 (#95000029)	237 S. Wilson St. 36°38′30″N 95°09′07″W	Vinita	
10	Spraker Service Station		February 23, 1995 (#95000030)	240 S. Wilson St. 36°38′06″N 95°09′22″W	Vinita	Demolished.
11	Walker Farmhouse		September 9, 2013 (#13000705)	Address Restricted	Welch	Part of the Cherokee Trail of Tears MPS

== See also ==
- List of National Historic Landmarks in Oklahoma
- National Register of Historic Places listings in Oklahoma
