= Crispus Attucks (disambiguation) =

Crispus Attucks (c. 1723–1770) is the American mixed-race former slave, killed in the Boston Massacre.

Crispus Attucks also may refer to:

- Crispus Attucks Club, a national organization for African Americans in the United States
- Crispus Attucks High School in Indianapolis, Indiana
- Crispus Attucks Museum in Indianapolis, Indiana
- Crispus Attucks Elementary School in Kansas City, Missouri

== See also ==
- Attucks High School (Hopkinsville, Kentucky)
- Attucks School (Vinita, Oklahoma)
- Attucks Theatre (Norfolk, Virginia)
