= Attucks =

Attucks may refer to:

== People ==
- Crispus Attucks, early victim of the American Revolution

== Institutions ==
- Attucks Theatre, located in Norfolk, Virginia
- Crispus Attucks Communication and Writing Magnet School, elementary school located in Kansas City, Missouri
- Crispus Attucks High School, high school located in Indianapolis, Indiana
- Attucks High School, school in Hopkinsville, Kentucky
- Attucks School, school in Vinita, Oklahoma

== Commerce ==
- Attucks Music Publishing Company (1904–1911), Manhattan, New York
