= Jackson Conoco Service Station =

- U.S. National Register of Historic Places
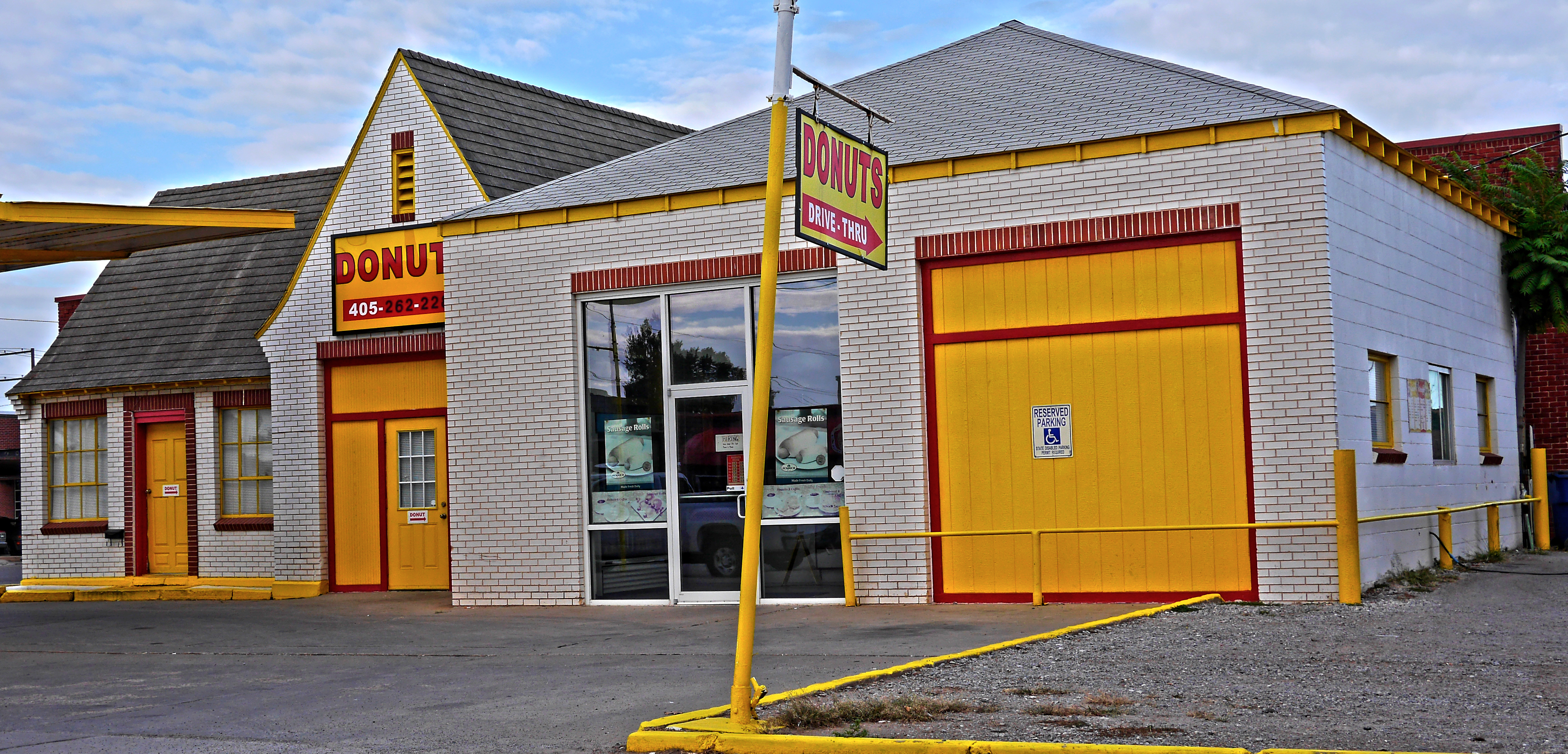

- Location within Oklahoma Location within the United States
- Location: 301 South Choctaw, El Reno, Oklahoma
- Coordinates: 35.531389°N 97.954167°W
- Area: less than one acre
- Built: 1934
- NRHP reference No.: 04000132
- Added to NRHP: March 2, 2004

The Jackson Conoco Service Station is a one-story brick structure located in El Reno, Oklahoma. Listed on the National Register of Historic Places in 2004, it was constructed by the Continental Oil Company in 1934 as a service station to serve the increasing automobile traffic along Route 66. Conoco built and operated many such facilities in the 1930s, all identical except for the positioning of the service bay; one other example is listed on the NRHP in Oklahoma, the Spraker Service Station in Vinita.

In 1964 the property was sold to A.M. Cavin and his wife, who leased it back to Conoco and continued to operate it as a gas station. The Cavins also took out a mortgage from Conoco to construct service bays on the south side of the building. By 1969 it was known as Paul's Conoco. The property changed hands several times in the ensuing years and stopped operating as a gas station in 1990.

== See also ==
- Continental Oil Company Building: NRHP-listed Conoco bulk storage complex in Cheyenne, Wyoming
- Continental Oil Company Filling Station: NRHP-listed Conoco gas station in Kalispell, Montana
- Hughes Conoco Service Station: NRHP-listed Conoco gas station in Topeka, Kansas
- Huning Highlands Conoco Service Station: NRHP-listed Conoco gas station in Albuquerque, New Mexico
- Rainbow Conoco: NRHP-listed Conoco gas station in Shelby, Montana
- Spraker Service Station: NRHP-listed Conoco gas station in Vinita, Oklahoma
