= American Heartland Theme Park =

Cancelled theme park in Vinita, Oklahoma

American Heartland

- Concept art
- Interactive map of American Heartland
- Location: American Heartland, Vinita, Oklahoma, United States
- Coordinates: 36.629°N 95.062°W
- Status: Cancelled
- Owner: Mansion Entertainment Group
- Operated by: Mansion Entertainment Group
- Theme: Americana
- Area: 125-acre (51 ha)

The American Heartland Theme Park was a planned theme park in Vinita, Oklahoma. The park is part of a 1,000-acre development with the park being 125 acres and costing around $2 billion US.

== Construction ==
By September 2024, construction had halted due to financial issues, with the project's budget increased from $2 billion to $2.5 billion.

== Areas and attractions ==
Created by former Disney Imagineers, American Heartland would consist of six themed lands, which would be Liberty Village, Great Plains, Bayou Bay, Big Timber Falls, Stony Point Harbor, and Electropolis. The resort would also include a 300-room hotel, a water park, a dinner theatre, an amphitheater, a swimming pool, a clubhouse, and an RV park. The RV park, Three Ponies RV and Campground, would consist of 750 RV spaces and 300 cabins, and was to open in 2025. The park was originally set to open in the fall of 2026. The park was then set to open in 2028.

== Cancellation ==
As of July 1, 2025 no construction was underway at the site and no major work had been completed. The websites for the theme park and the parent company were both shuttered. Lawsuits against the parent company were filed prior the apparent abandonment of the project.
