= Hughes Conoco Service Station =

- U.S. National Register of Historic Places
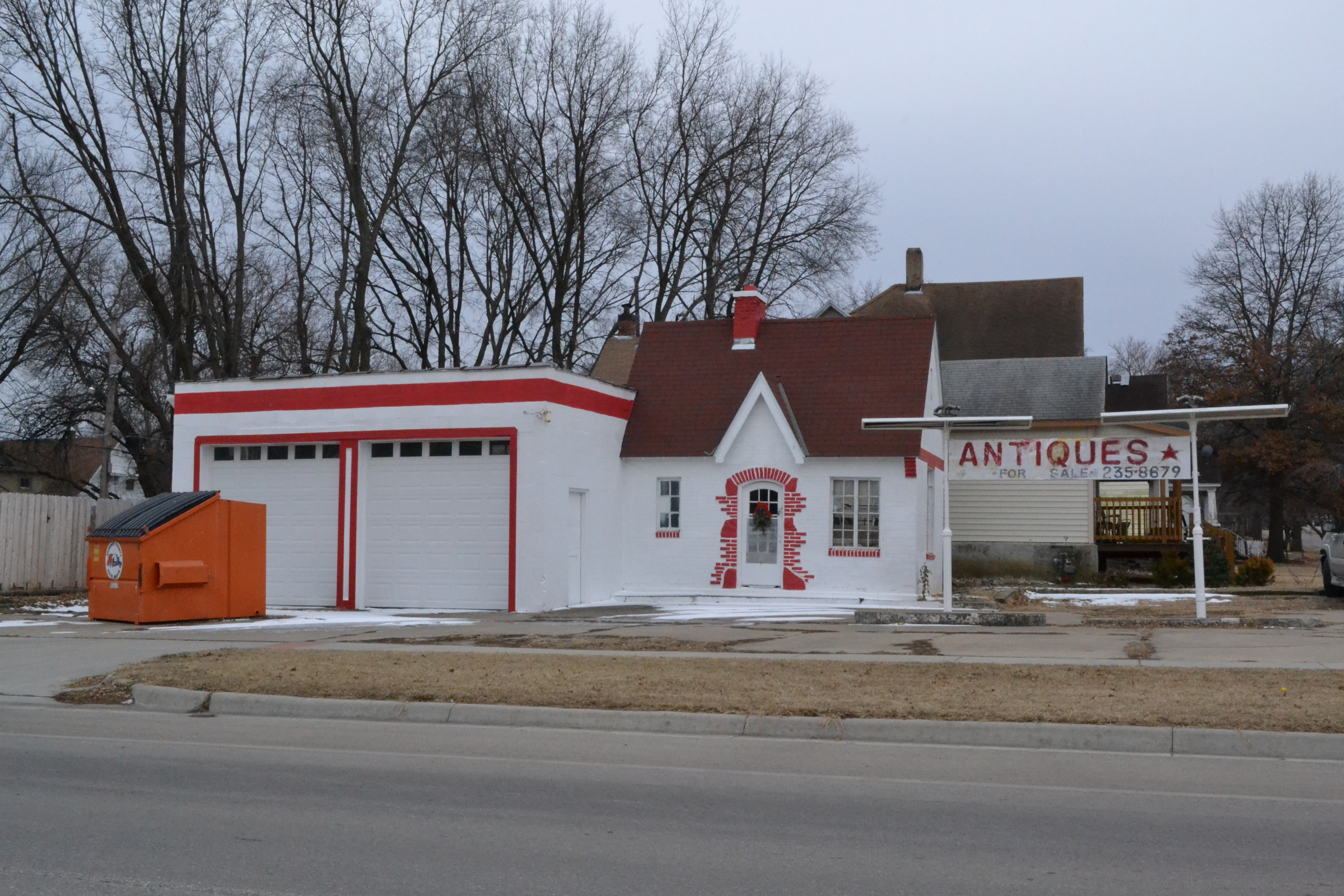

- Location within Kansas
- Location: 400 SW. Taylor St., Topeka, Kansas
- Coordinates: 39°03′25″N 95°40′54″W
- Area: Less than one acre
- Architectural style: Late 19th and 20th Century Revivals, Tudor Revival
- MPS: Roadside Kansas MPS
- NRHP reference No.: 11000411
- Added to NRHP: July 5, 2011

The Hughes Conoco Service Station at 400 Southwest Taylor Street in Topeka, Kansas, was built in 1930 and listed on the National Register of Historic Places in 2011. It includes elements of Tudor Revival architecture and other late 19th and 20th century revival styling.

== See also ==
- Continental Oil Company Building: NRHP-listed Conoco bulk storage complex in Cheyenne, Wyoming
- Continental Oil Company Filling Station: NRHP-listed Conoco gas station in Kalispell, Montana
- Huning Highlands Conoco Service Station: NRHP-listed Conoco gas station in Albuquerque, New Mexico
- Jackson Conoco Service Station: NRHP-listed Conoco gas station in El Reno, Oklahoma
- Rainbow Conoco: NRHP-listed Conoco gas station in Shelby, Montana
- Spraker Service Station: NRHP-listed Conoco gas station in Vinita, Oklahoma
