= Continental Oil Company Filling Station =

- U.S. National Register of Historic Places
- Location within Montana
- Location: 35 First Ave. N., Kalispell, Montana
- Coordinates: 48°11′54″N 114°18′42″W
- Area: less than one acre
- Built: c.1932
- Architectural style: Tudor Revival
- MPS: Kalispell MPS
- NRHP reference No.: 94000877
- Added to NRHP: August 24, 1994

The Continental Oil Company Filling Station Building at 35 First Ave. N. in Kalispell, Montana is a historic filling station built around 1932 for the Continental Oil Company. It was listed on the National Register of Historic Places in 1994. Since October 2020 the building has been home to a Lemontree seasonal home decor store.

Kalispel historically had a variety of gas stations; according to a 1993 area survey "The service stations that still exist vary greatly in style, from simple brick structures to an Art Deco-style building to one designed to look like a Tudor-style residence."

== Architecture ==
This station at 35 First Ave is the Tudor-style one. It was deemed to be "an excellent example of a domestic-style filling station popular in the 1920s and 1930s, and it is the only example of this type in Kalispell. The Tudor-style building has a brick veneer and a steeply pitched gabled roof covered with wood shingles. The lower ends of the roof are slightly flared. Part of the south elevation has been sided in diagonal wood siding, covering two garage bays. The windows are six- and twelve-light metal units, with some picture windows, with brick sills and lintels. The windows in the gable ends are very narrow. The entry on the south has half-timbering below the window and decorative patterned bricks. The floor of the building is concrete throughout, and the walls are also concrete. The door on the west has vertical wide boards and iron strap hinges. Above the door on the south, now the main entrance, one can still see the outline where the letters CONOCO used to be mounted. The building probably represents a corporate design of the period; several visitors to the building have commented that the design is identical to other filling stations they have seen. The concrete construction, however, indicates that it probably was not prefabricated and shipped to Kalispell."

== See also ==
- Continental Oil Company Building: NRHP-listed Conoco bulk storage complex in Cheyenne, Wyoming
- Jackson Conoco Service Station: NRHP-listed Conoco gas station in El Reno, Oklahoma
- Hughes Conoco Service Station: NRHP-listed Conoco gas station in Topeka, Kansas
- Huning Highlands Conoco Service Station: NRHP-listed Conoco gas station in Albuquerque, New Mexico
- Rainbow Conoco: NRHP-listed Conoco gas station in Shelby, Montana
- Spraker Service Station: NRHP-listed Conoco gas station in Vinita, Oklahoma
