= Continental Oil Company (Cheyenne, Wyoming) =

- U.S. National Register of Historic Places
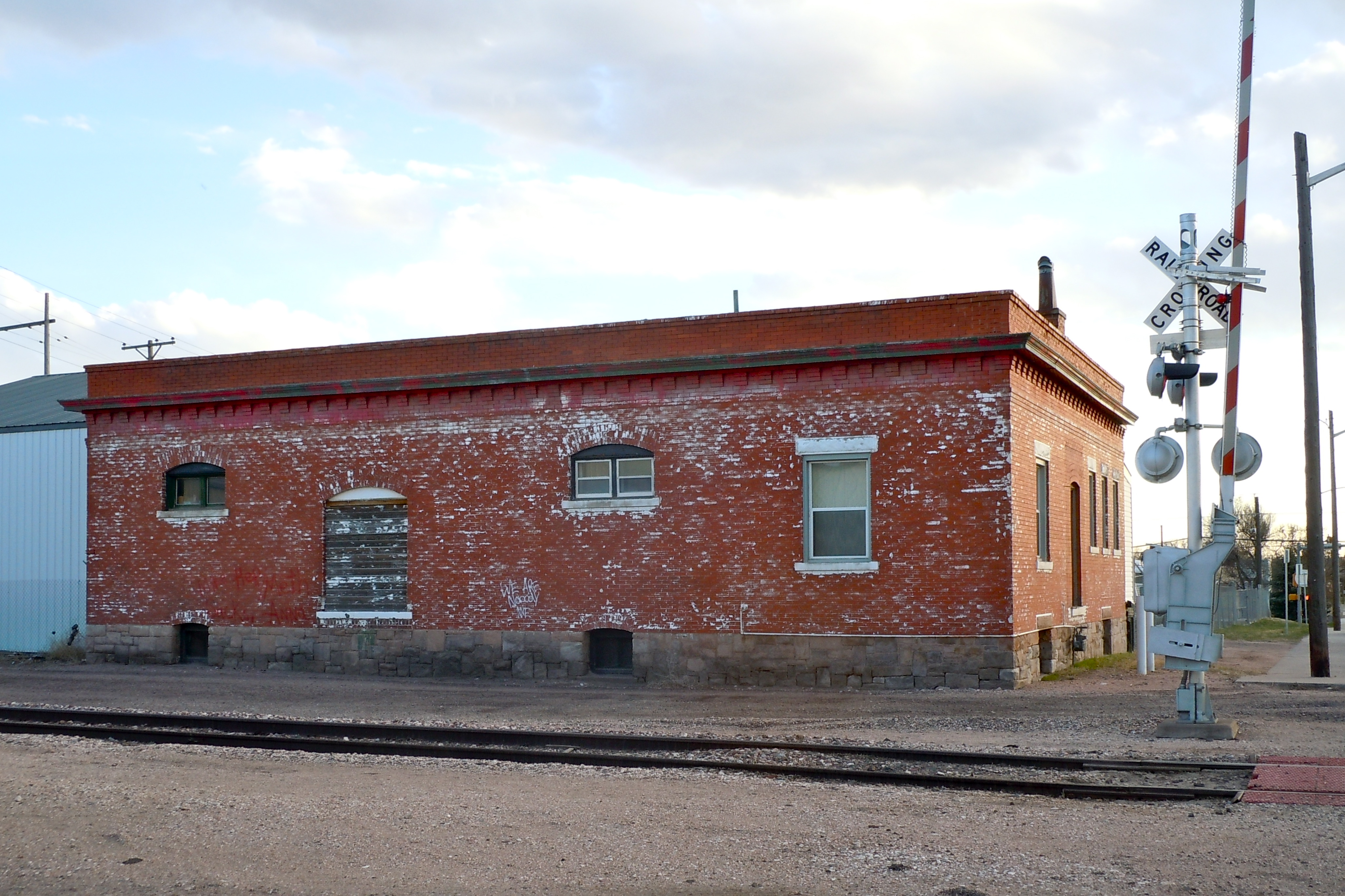
- Continental Oil Company building in 2011

- Location within Wyoming
- Location: 801 W. 19th St., Cheyenne, Wyoming
- Coordinates: 41°7′57″N 104°49′24″W
- Area: less than one acre
- Built: 1905
- Architectural style: Early Commercial
- MPS: Industrial Facilities Served by Railroad in Cheyenne, Wyoming MPS
- NRHP reference No.: 03001030
- Added to NRHP: October 13, 2003

The Continental Oil Company building complex is a significant component of railroad-related economic activity in Cheyenne, Wyoming. Built beginning in 1905, the complex was used by the Continental Oil Company for bulk oil storage through much of the 20th century. The property was transferred to the Sioux Oil Company, which vacated the complex in 1990. In 2000 the property was occupied by a trailer sales business.

The three-building property is associated with a rail line that runs next to Reed Avenue on the west side of Cheyenne. Building 1 measures 40 feet (12 m) by 60 feet (18 m). The building is built over a shallow basement, expressed on the facade with sandstone masonry. The east side is the most detailed elevation with a corbeled, dentiled cornice that extends around to the north side. A brick addition on the south side was used as an oil pump house. The west side features a wood loading dock. The interior is mostly open space with a small office area.

Building 2 is a 35-foot (11 m) by 26-foot (7.9 m) one-story brick garage. Building 3 is a 1956 metal building. The site originally had seven large oil tanks, which have been removed. Leakage from the tanks contaminated the site and has required extensive mitigation.

The property was placed on the National Register of Historic Places on October 13, 2003.

== See also ==
- Continental Oil Company Filling Station: NRHP-listed Conoco gas station in Kalispell, Montana
- Jackson Conoco Service Station: NRHP-listed Conoco gas station in El Reno, Oklahoma
- Hughes Conoco Service Station: NRHP-listed Conoco gas station in Topeka, Kansas
- Huning Highlands Conoco Service Station: NRHP-listed Conoco gas station in Albuquerque, New Mexico
- Rainbow Conoco: NRHP-listed Conoco gas station in Shelby, Montana
- Spraker Service Station: NRHP-listed Conoco gas station in Vinita, Oklahoma
