= Rainbow Conoco =

- U.S. National Register of Historic Places
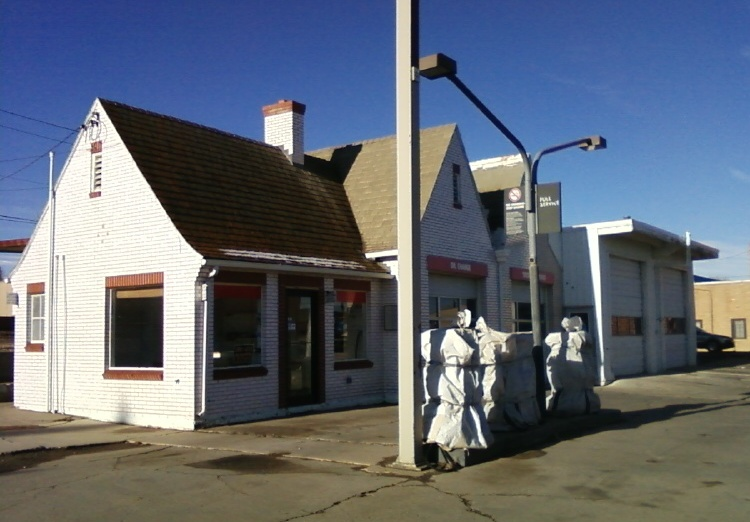

- Location within Montana Location within the United States
- Location: 400 Main St., Shelby, Montana
- Coordinates: 48°30′23″N 111°51′31″W
- Area: less than one acre
- Built: 1936, 1941, 1975
- Built by: Continental Oil Co.
- MPS: Roadside Architecture Along US 2 in Montana MPS
- NRHP reference No.: 94000866
- Added to NRHP: August 16, 1994

The Rainbow Conoco at 400 Main St. in Shelby, Montana, also known as Joe's, was built in 1936. It was listed on the National Register of Historic Places in 1994.

It was a gas and car repair station designed by Continental Oil Co. architects as an "English cottage-type station". The design included a steeply pitched gable roof with dark green asphalt shingles, contrasting to the off-white glazed brick exterior. It was built in 1936 and expanded in the same style, to add a second service bay, in 1941. A 29 by 35 feet (8.8 m × 10.7 m) flat roof expansion which does not match was added in 1975 when Joe Kincaid took over operation. Twenty-eight years later in 1993, Kincaid still operated the station.

It was deemed significant as "one of finest examples of 1930s era gas station design in Montana" and as "the best original domestic, English cottage design remaining in the State. The styling reflected the desire to avoid conflict with nearby residential environments and blend effectively with adjacent commercial structures. The beautifully maintained glazed brick exterior is accentuated with natural brick trim around windows and doors in the classic 1930s style. The high-pitched gable roof and distinctive white and green color scheme made the station a familiar and recognizable landmark."

== See also ==
- Continental Oil Company Building: NRHP-listed Conoco bulk storage complex in Cheyenne, Wyoming
- Continental Oil Company Filling Station: NRHP-listed Conoco gas station in Kalispell, Montana
- Jackson Conoco Service Station: NRHP-listed Conoco gas station in El Reno, Oklahoma
- Hughes Conoco Service Station: NRHP-listed Conoco gas station in Topeka, Kansas
- Huning Highlands Conoco Service Station: NRHP-listed Conoco gas station in Albuquerque, New Mexico
- Spraker Service Station: NRHP-listed Conoco gas station in Vinita, Oklahoma
