= Will Rogers Archway =

Rest stop in Vinita, Oklahoma, U.S.

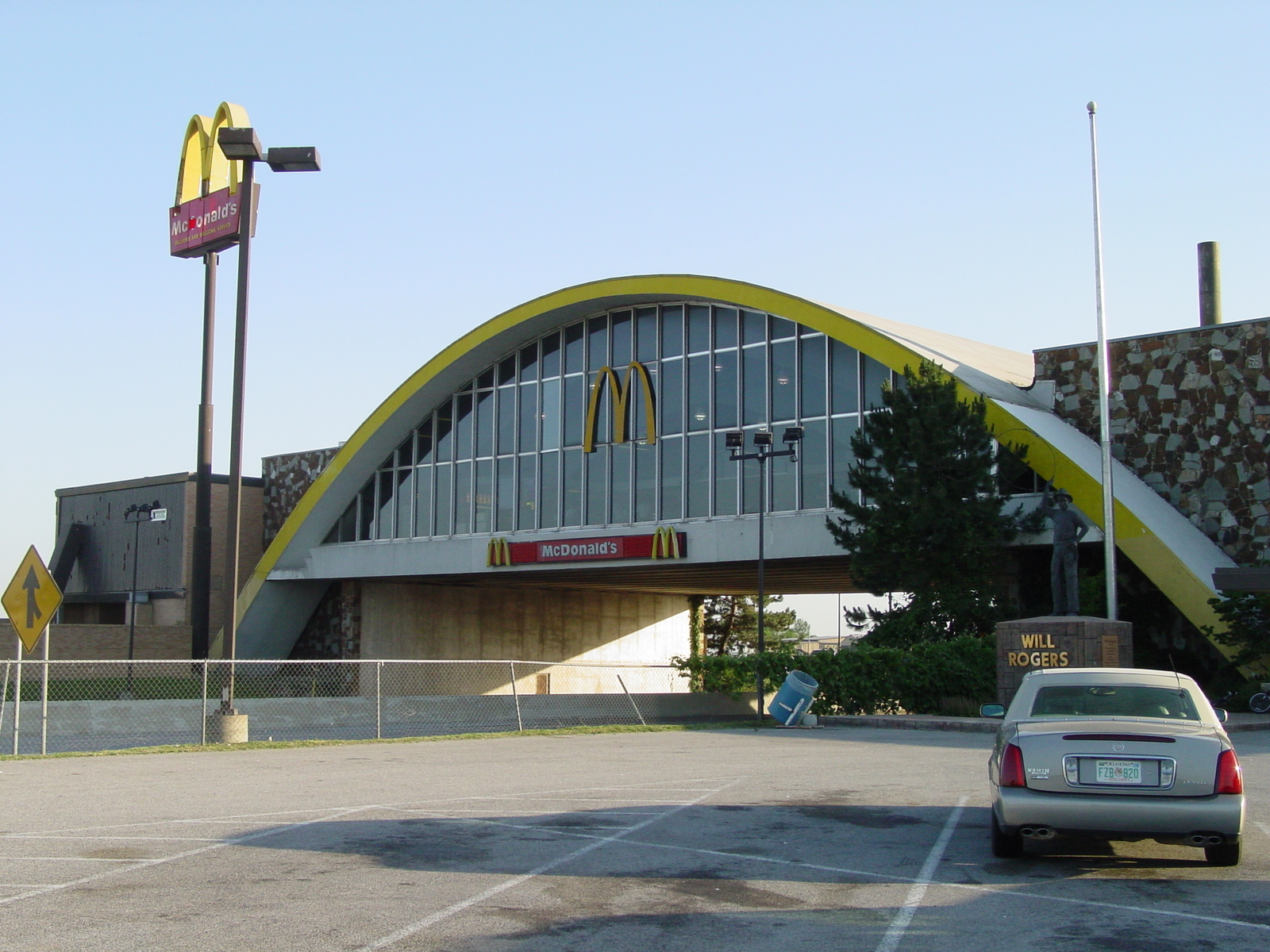
- A view from the western parking lot circa 2006; the statue of Will Rogers can just be seen in front of the building.
- Interactive map of Will Rogers Archway

Restaurant information
- Established: 1957
- Location: 767 Will Rogers Turnpike, Vinita, Craig County, Oklahoma, 74301, United States
- Coordinates: 36.62331°N 95.14803°W

The Will Rogers Archway, originally named the Glass House Restaurant and today nicknamed as The Glass House, is a 29,135-square-foot (2,706.7 m^{2}) service station that spans the Will Rogers Turnpike section of Interstate 44 (I-44) near Vinita, Oklahoma. Originally operating solely as a McDonald's restaurant, it was notable as the first bridge restaurant opened over a U.S. highway and as an example of a U.S. roadside restaurant. When it was solely a McDonald's, it was the world's largest McDonald's before the current largest McDonald's in the world located in Orlando, Florida was built.

The archway also features a Maverik (previously a Phillips 66 and Kum & Go) gas station.

The building and service plaza closed on June 4, 2013, for a $14.6 million renovation. At its grand reopening on December 22, 2014, it was renamed from "Glass House Restaurant" to "Will Rogers Archway", although the renaming was actually officiated in August 2014. McDonald's still operates in the archway post-renovation, but it is now joined by a separate Subway franchise in the building.

At the front of the west anchor stands a statue of Will Rogers. The building contains a small Will Rogers museum.

== Gallery ==
=== Pre-2014 renovation ===
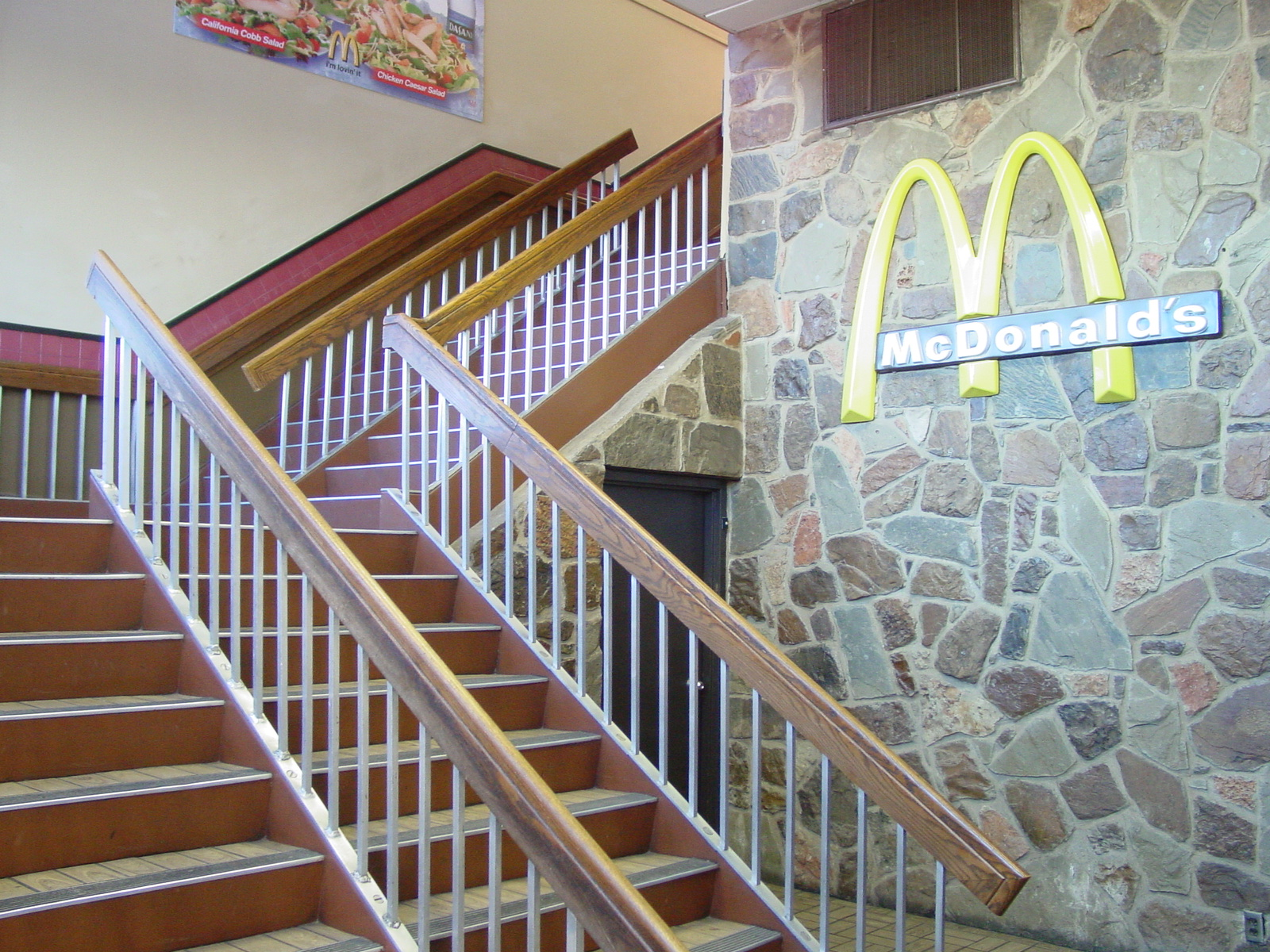
Stairwell inside of the west anchor

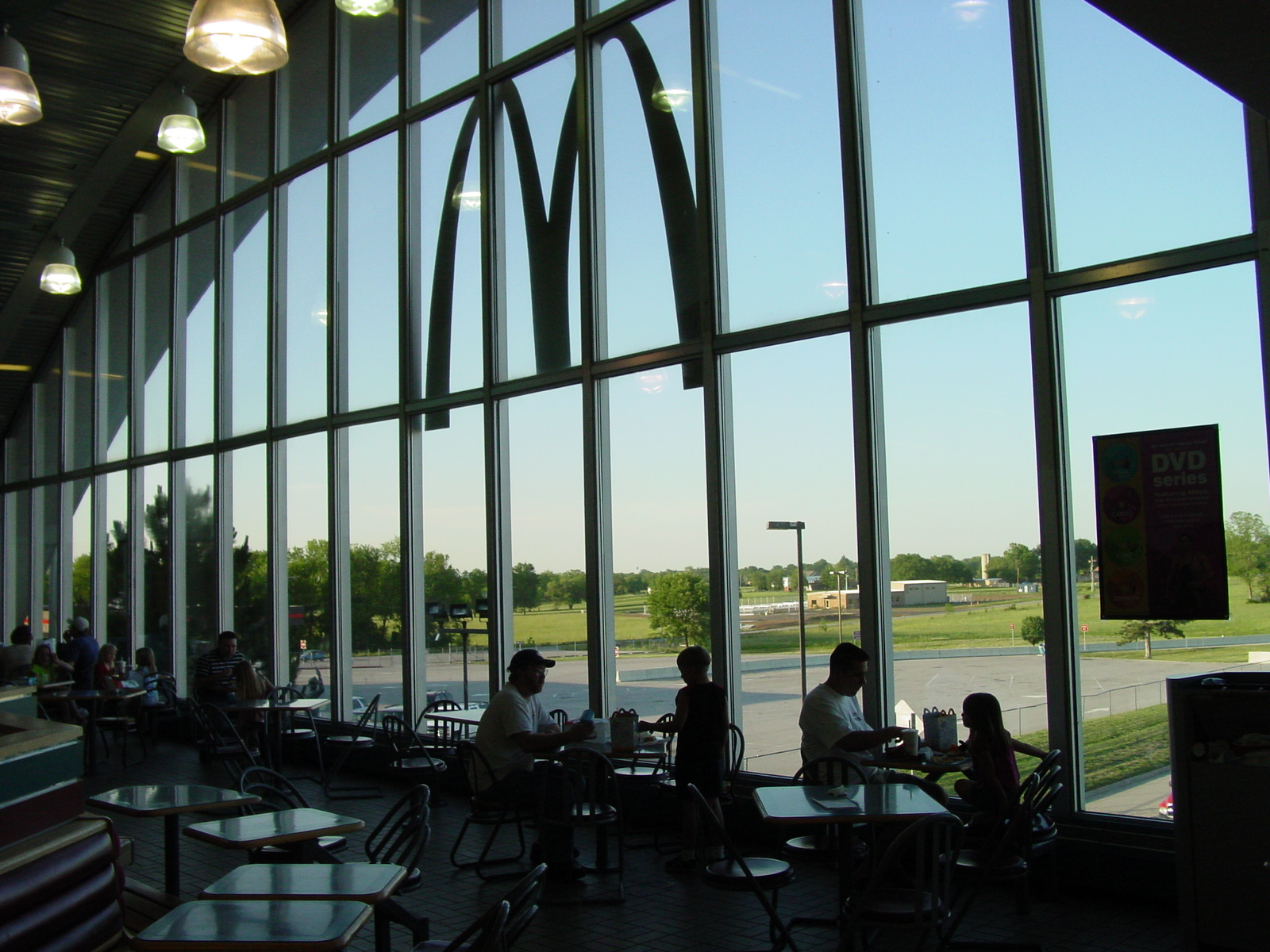
Inside the McDonald's looking northwest

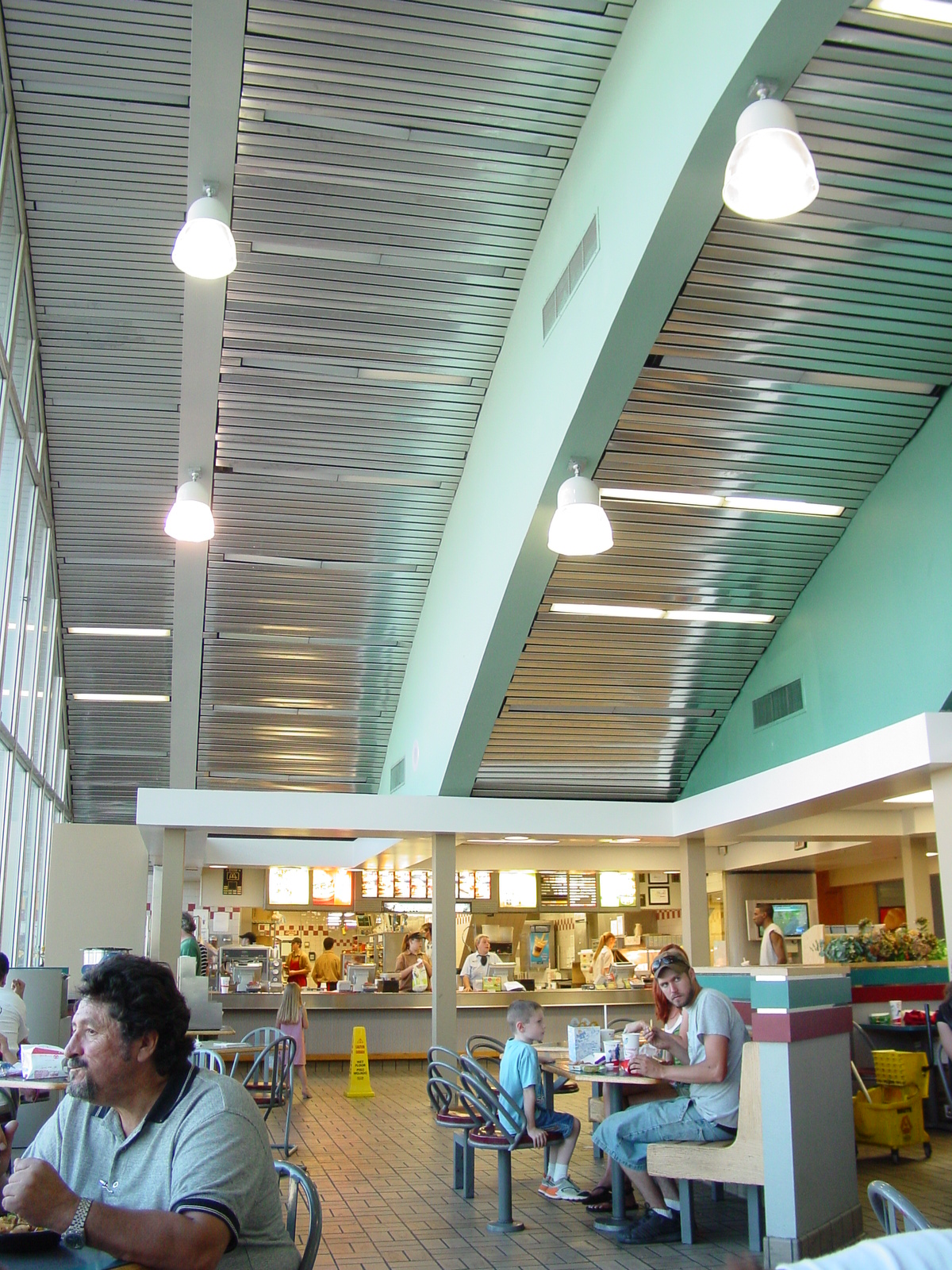
Looking toward the counter on the east side of the restaurant
