= John T. Waller =

American architect

John T. Waller was an architect in the United States known for his work in Hopkinsville, Kentucky. Buildings he designed include Attucks High School which is listed on the National Register of Historic Places, the Courthouse Annex, and the historic Alhambra Theatre in Hopkinsville, Kentucky. He also designed former mayor / mill owner Frank K. Yost home ("Hilltop") in Hopkinsville. He had an office on the corner of Main and Ninth Street in Hopkinsville. He also designed the Ninth Street Central Fire Station that was built in 1925.

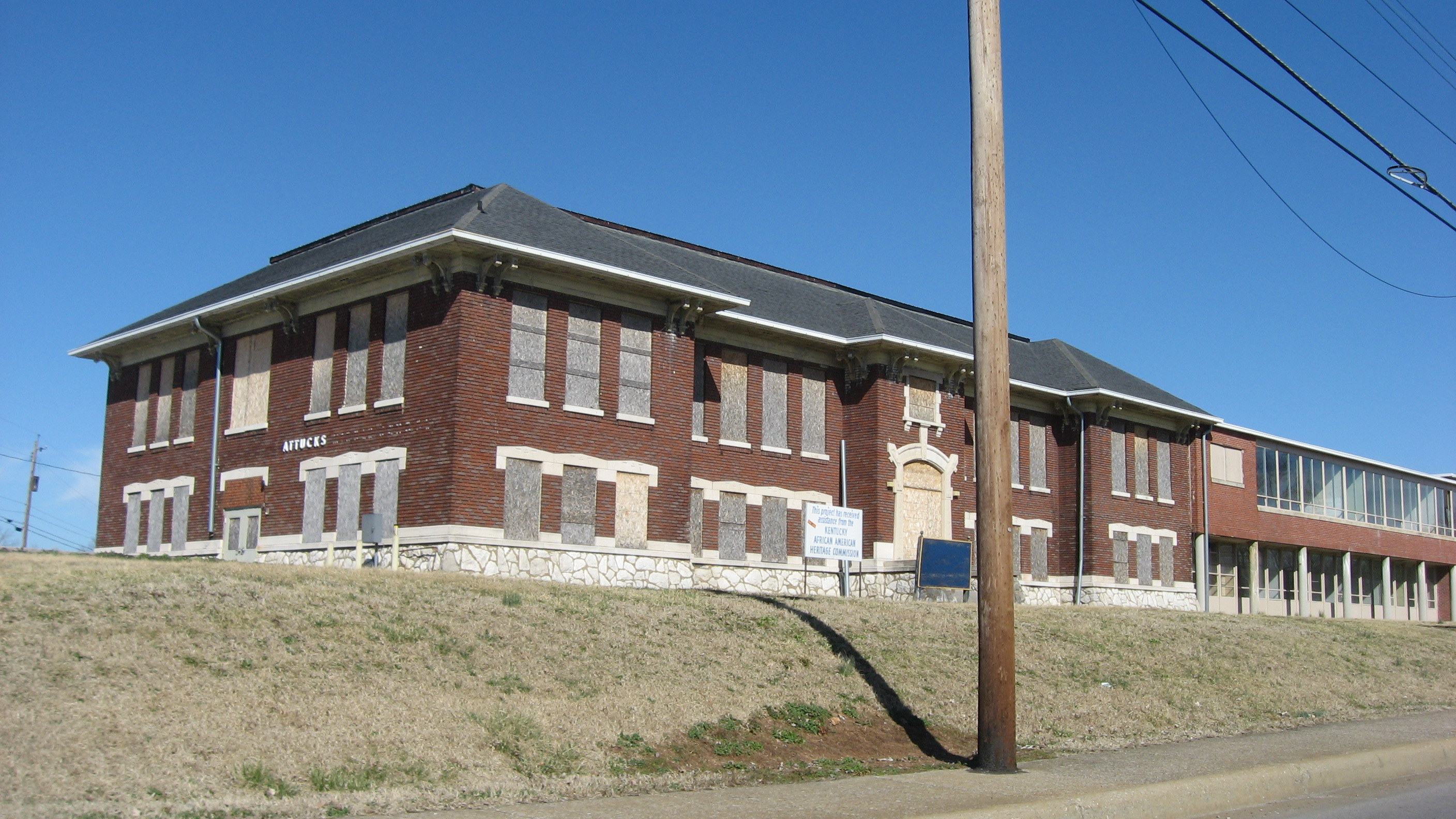
Attucks High School

Attucks High School (1916) was Hopkinsville's first school for African Americans. It became a middle school after desegregation, closed in 1988, and is being redeveloped as a community center after being empty for years.

Waller was the principal architect in Hopkinsville from 1900 until 1915.

== Work ==
- Attucks High School (1916)
- Courthouse Annex and Alhambra Theatre (1928), Hopkinsville NRHP listed

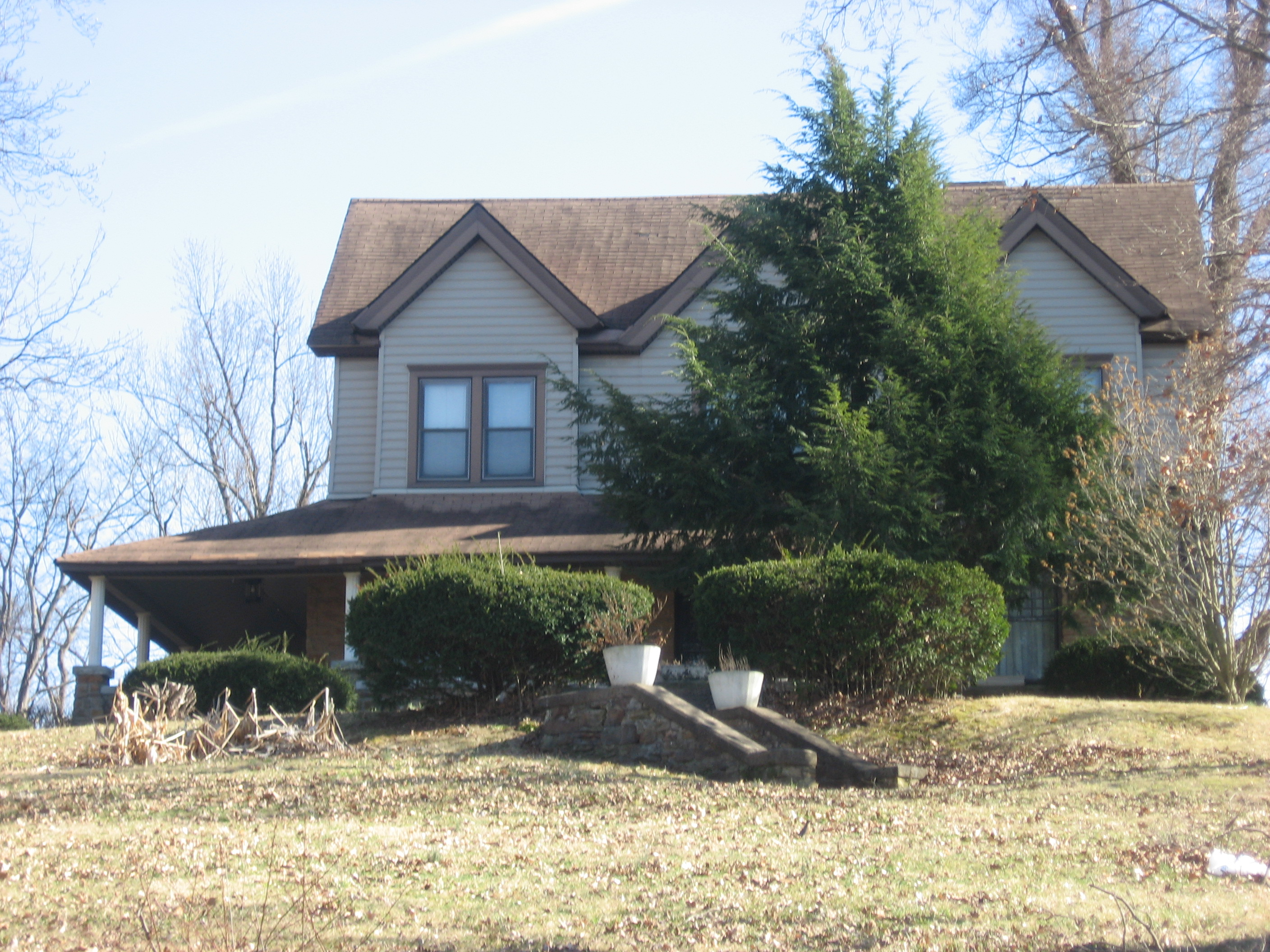
Frank K. Yost House

- Frank K. Yost House (1908), "Hilltop", mayor and mill owner Frank K. Yost's home, East 7th Street, Hopkinsville, NRHP listed
- Ninth Street Central Fire Station (1925), Hopkinsville
- Morton's Gap Christian Church (1930)
- Carnegie Library (1914), Hopkinsville
- 2-story bank
- Riverside Chapel (1916)
- Store for J. H. Anderson (1917)
