= Huning Highlands Conoco Service Station =

- U.S. National Register of Historic Places
- NM State Register of Cultural Properties
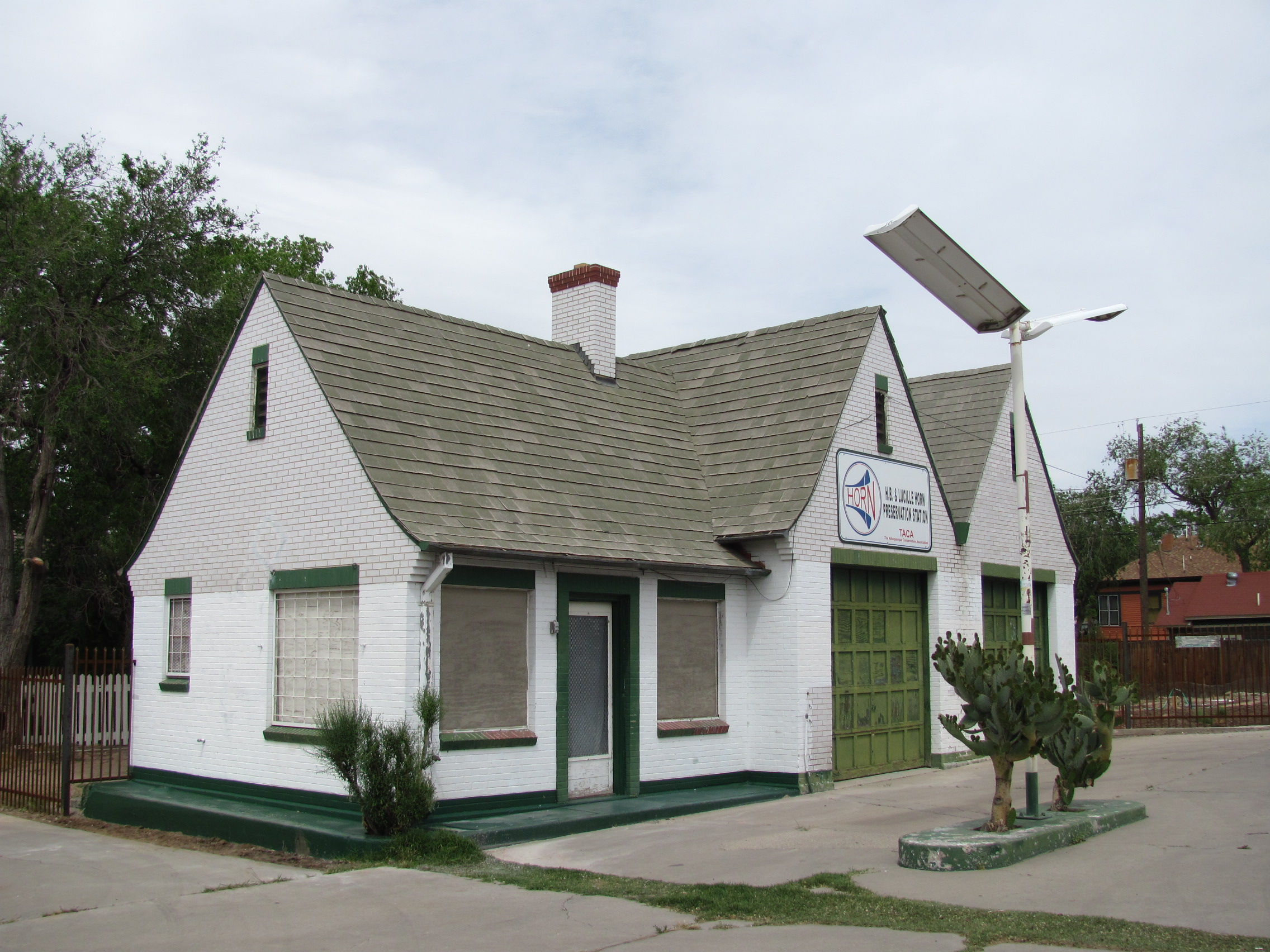
- The service station in 2010

- Location within New Mexico Location within the United States
- Location: 601 Coal Ave. SE, Albuquerque, New Mexico
- Coordinates: 35°4′52″N 106°38′30″W
- Built: 1937
- NRHP reference No.: 06000633
- NMSRCP No.: 1891

Significant dates
- Added to NRHP: July 19, 2006
- Designated NMSRCP: April 7, 2006

The Huning Highlands Conoco Service Station is a historic gas station in the Huning Highlands neighborhood of Albuquerque, New Mexico. It was built in 1937 by the Continental Oil Company (Conoco) and is notable as a well-preserved example of the automobile-oriented development that shaped the city during the mid-20th century. The building was listed on the New Mexico State Register of Cultural Properties and the National Register of Historic Places in 2006.

The service station is built in the form of a cottage, a popular design at the time, with a steeply pitched compound gable roof and a chimney. The walls are white glazed brick with green trim. The building has a side-gabled office section on the west side adjoining two front-gabled garage bays with wooden roll-up doors. The easternmost garage bay was an addition built onto the original station around 1939. The property also includes concrete gas pump islands, a c. 1960s light pole and a steel sign post, though the pumps, tanks, and signage have been removed. The station was operated by Conoco until 1961, then by Horn Oil Company until around 1983. In 1992, the vacant station was leased by the Albuquerque Conservation Association (TACA), which uses the building as headquarters for its preservation workshops and other activities.

== See also ==
- Continental Oil Company Building: NRHP-listed Conoco bulk storage complex in Cheyenne, Wyoming
- Continental Oil Company Filling Station: NRHP-listed Conoco gas station in Kalispell, Montana
- Jackson Conoco Service Station: NRHP-listed Conoco gas station in El Reno, Oklahoma
- Hughes Conoco Service Station: NRHP-listed Conoco gas station in Topeka, Kansas
- Rainbow Conoco: NRHP-listed Conoco gas station in Shelby, Montana
- Spraker Service Station: NRHP-listed Conoco gas station in Vinita, Oklahoma
