= Tom Threepersons =

American lawman

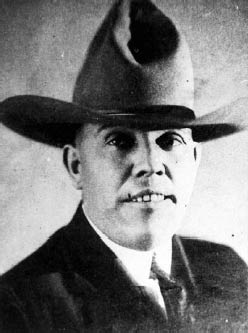
- Born: July 22, 1889; Possibly Vinita, Indian Territory
- Died: April 2, 1969 (aged 79); Safford, Arizona, US
- Occupation(s): Gunfighter, lawman, soldier, U.S. Customs inspector, blacksmith, inventor, rancher and hunting guide
- Known for: Inventor of the "Tom Threepersons holster"

Tom Threepersons (July 22, 1889 – April 2, 1969) was an American lawman. He is considered to have been one of the last of gunfighters of the Old West although his career did not begin until the early 20th century. He invented the "Tom Threepersons holster."

== Early life ==
=== Disputed backstory ===
Historians from the Cherokee Nation, including Morningstar, have claimed that "Tom Threepersons" was an assumed identity, including his backstory about being the son of a Cherokee Chief, and that the birth name of this person is presently lost to history. The name Threepersons does not appear on the Dawes Rolls. However, other historians stress that the Dawes Rolls would not apply to Tom Threepersons, because his family moved to Canada before they were recorded. These historians also stress that Cherokee Nation participates in the practice of oral history, and that practice should be to trust, but verify.

=== The tale of Threeperson's youth ===
Threepersons is said to have been born in Vinita, Indian Territory on July 22, 1889 to John and Bell Threepersons. It is unlikely he or his parents had Threepersons as a given name, as it is not a Cherokee name and no records exist of him under the name until after Blackfoot rancher Tom Three Persons, who he is often confused with, became regionally famous for winning the 1912 Calgary Stampede saddle bronc competition. Threepersons is known to have pretended to be Three Persons on at least one occasion.

Threepersons' family and that of his friend, Bill White, are said to have both moved to the Montana-Alberta border in the 1890s. He claimed to have attended Carlisle Indian Industrial School in Carlisle, Pennsylvania, but there appears to be no record of this. After returning from school, he is said to have rode the rodeo circuit throughout Oregon, Washington, Wyoming, and possibly Colorado.

Threepersons claimed that in 1907, his and White's fathers were killed during a fight with cattle rustlers and that the suspects were arrested, but released on bond. He claimed to have tracked them to a saloon, where he confronted both suspects and killed them during a shootout. He is said to have been arrested for murder but later acquitted. There is no record of any of this occurring, and the story bears a resemblance to a widely publicized story from the same year about a ranger named Frank Wheeler.

=== The tale of his Early Career ===
Threepersons and Bill White reportedly joined the Royal North-West Mounted Police and were stationed near Calgary; however, no records show a Threepersons serving in the mounted police. Shortly thereafter the two were assigned to capture a gang of outlaws who had murdered an entire family. Threepersons and White tracked the suspects for five days through heavy snow toward the Yukon River in Alaska, having to abandon their horses and continue on foot, carrying their weapons and backpacks. On the fifth day, they encountered the gang of three men, and engaged them in a shootout, during which White and one of the outlaws were killed. The other two fled. Threepersons buried White then continued after the outlaws. Several days later, at a small settlement called End of the Trail, Threepersons located them. Rather than confronting them in the town, he located the cabin where they were staying outside of town, and waited for them there. When they arrived, a shootout ensued during which both outlaws were killed.

He moved to Douglas, Arizona around 1914, where he worked as a cowboy.

== Verifiable History ==
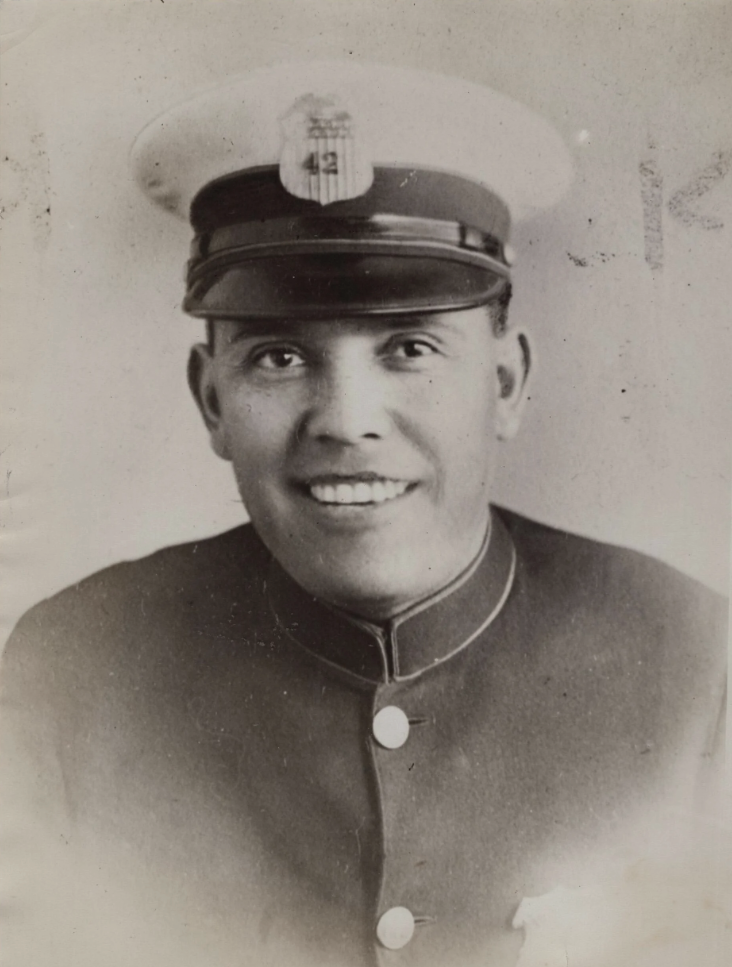
US Army service photograph of Threepersons

The verifiable historical record of Tom Threepersons begins on the day that he met Black Jack Pershing during the Punitive Expedition.

In 1916, he joined the U.S. Army, and served under General Jack Pershing in pursuit of Pancho Villa in Mexico. He was later assigned to Fort Bliss on the Texas–New Mexico state line. In the 1920 census for El Paso, his profession is listed as blacksmith. While at Fort Bliss, he was injured when kicked in the head by a horse, causing him severe headaches for the rest of his life. He was discharged from the army in 1920.

He worked for two years for the El Paso Police. He was partnered with officer Juan Escontrias, and the two were involved in two shootouts during that time with smugglers, resulting in four suspects being killed, and Threepersons being shot and wounded in the chest during one incident in 1921.

On June 10, 1922, Threepersons was appointed as a Federal Prohibition Agent for El Paso, where he worked for 90 days.

He resigned to manage the "Cudahy Ranch" in Durango, Mexico. During his brief employment for the ranch, he killed two rustlers during a shootout. He was arrested by Mexican authorities for the shooting, but escaped and returned to the United States.

In July 1923, Threepersons accepted a position as a Mounted Inspector for the U.S. Customs Service. That same year he was run-over by a bootlegger's vehicle during an arrest, which resulted in injuries, none serious. From 1925 he worked for both the El Paso County Sheriffs Office and the El Paso Police Department. Locally, Threepersons was well known for his exploits, and starting in 1925, the S.D. Myres Saddle Co., of El Paso, began advertising the "Tom Threepersons-style holsters". The holster, which included a cutaway top exposing the pistol hammer and trigger guard, became popular and was copied by several other manufacturers.

Threepersons was offered a job in Hollywood, California in the film industry, reputedly at a salary of $700 per month, which he declined.

== Death and legacy ==
By 1929, Threepersons was suffering severe headaches from his head injury, and he left law enforcement to start a ranch near Gila, New Mexico. In 1933, he traveled to New York City to have corrective surgery for the injury. Following the successful surgery, he moved to Silver City, New Mexico, and spent the rest of his life working as a rancher and hunting guide.

Threepersons died on April 2, 1969 in Safford, Arizona, and is buried in the Masonic Cemetery in Silver City.

Lawman Threepersons is frequently confused with the Kainai rodeo star, Tom Three Persons, who was born in Canada.

The ninth episode of the second series of the Kraft Suspense Theatre (first broadcast 10 December 1964) was titled Threepersons, and told the story of a Cherokee gunfighter hired by the local prohibition officer on the Texas border to kill a Mexican bootlegger.

== Pop Culture ==
Threepersons is named in the Tom Clancy novel, Rainbow Six.
