= McDougal Filling Station =

- U.S. National Register of Historic Places
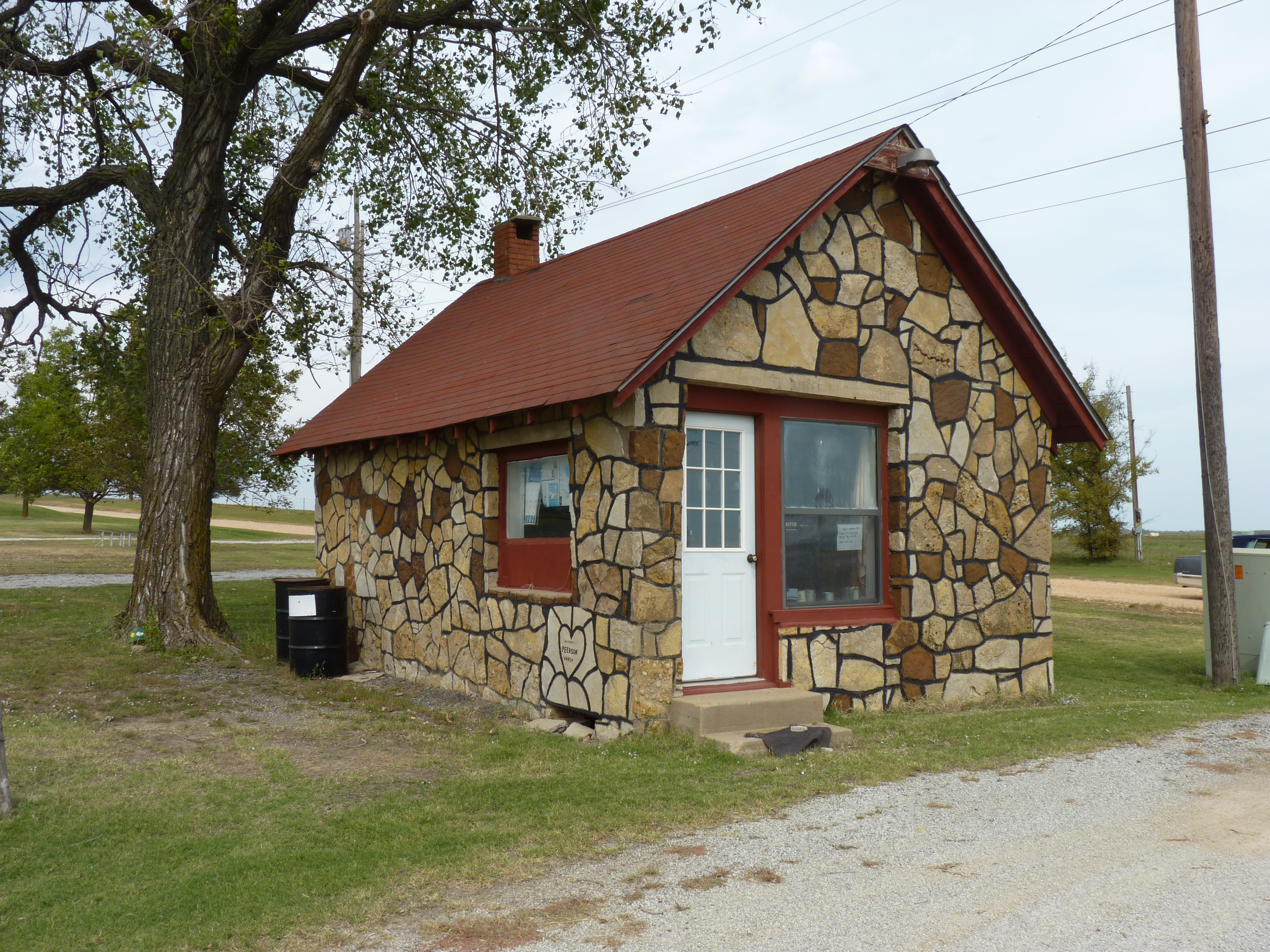

- Location within Oklahoma
- Nearest city: Vinita, Oklahoma
- Coordinates: 36°37′38″N 95°05′22″W
- Area: less than one acre
- Built: 1941
- Architectural style: House Type Gas Station
- MPS: Route 66 and Associated Resources in Oklahoma AD MPS
- NRHP reference No.: 04000521
- Added to NRHP: May 27, 2004

The McDougal Filling Station, at 443956 E. State Highway 60 near Vinita, Oklahoma, was built in 1941. It was listed on the National Register of Historic Places in 2004.

It is a wood-frame building with "distinctive stone veneer" built around 1941 on Route 66.
