= Randall Tire Company =

- U.S. National Register of Historic Places
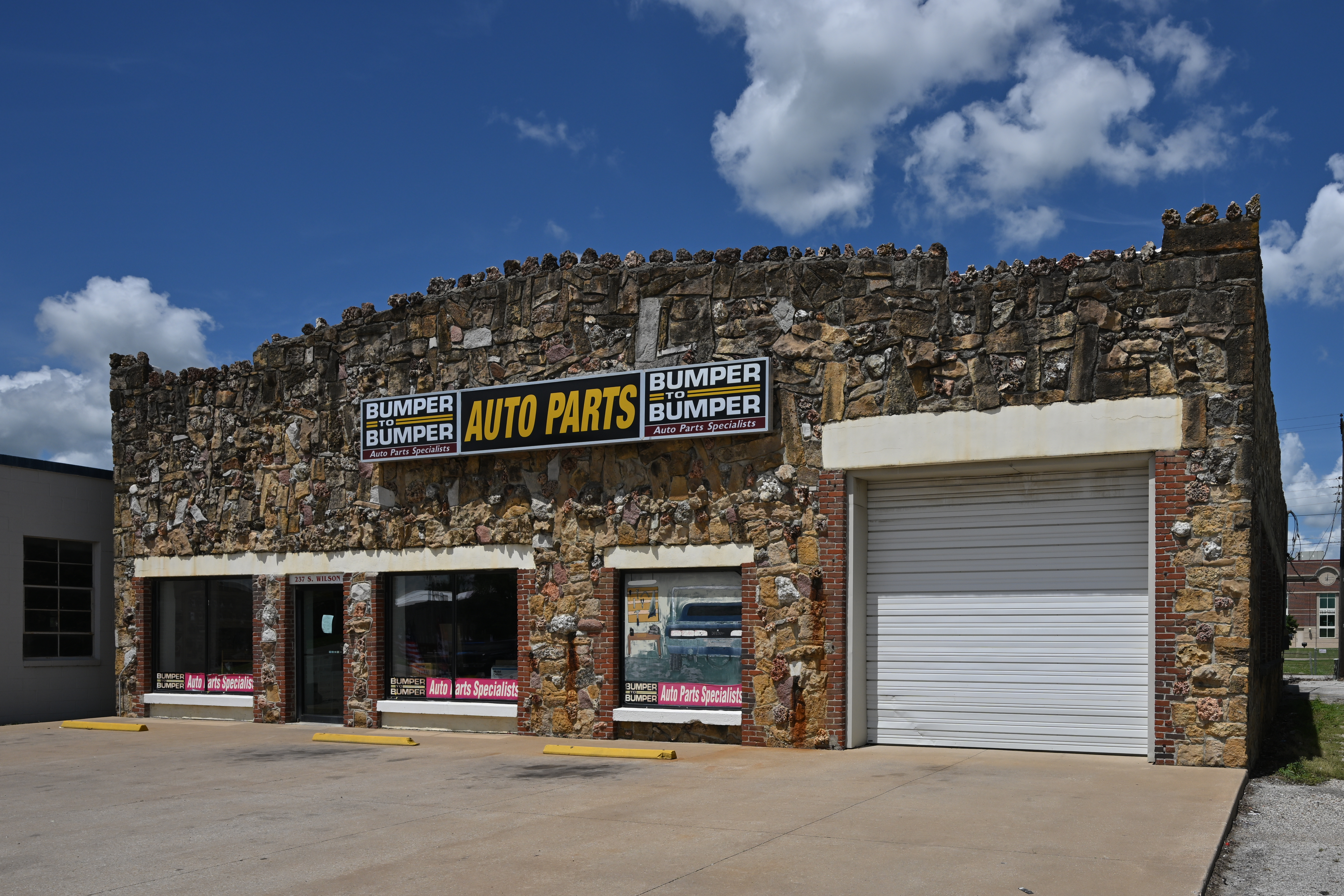

- Location within Oklahoma
- Location: 237 S. Wilson St., Vinita, Oklahoma
- Coordinates: 36°38′30″N 95°09′07″W
- Area: less than one acre
- Built: 1931
- MPS: Route 66 in Oklahoma MPS
- NRHP reference No.: 95000029
- Added to NRHP: February 23, 1995

The Randall Tire Company, at 237 S. Wilson St. in Vinita, Oklahoma, was built in 1931. It was listed on the National Register of Historic Places in 1995.

It is located on the west side of historic U.S. Route 66. It was deemed notable as "an excellent example of early vernacular Commercial Style architecture. The building is a onestory, native sandstone building with a flat roof. Unusually crafted with irregular shaped stone and beaded mortar work, the building is distinguished by a cresting of sandstone rocks along a curvilinear parapet. Located among a mix of property types, the building is situated on a commercial strip on the south edge of the city of Vinita in northeast Oklahoma."
