= Spraker Service Station =

- U.S. National Register of Historic Places
- Location within Oklahoma
- Location: 240 S. Wilson St., Vinita, Oklahoma, United States
- Coordinates: 36°38′06″N 95°09′22″W
- Area: Less than one acre
- Built: 1927
- Built by: Continental Oil Co.
- Architectural style: Tudor Revival
- MPS: Route 66 in Oklahoma MPS
- NRHP reference No.: 95000030
- Added to NRHP: February 23, 1995

The Spraker Service Station, at 240 S. Wilson St. in Vinita, Oklahoma, United States, was a Tudor Revival-style Conoco filling station constructed in 1927. It was listed on the National Register of Historic Places in 1995.

It was a one-story brick building, built on U.S. Route 66.

It has since been demolished.

== See also ==
- Continental Oil Company Building: NRHP-listed Conoco bulk storage complex in Cheyenne, Wyoming
- Continental Oil Company Filling Station: NRHP-listed Conoco gas station in Kalispell, Montana
- Jackson Conoco Service Station: NRHP-listed Conoco gas station in El Reno, Oklahoma
- Hughes Conoco Service Station: NRHP-listed Conoco gas station in Topeka, Kansas
- Huning Highlands Conoco Service Station: NRHP-listed Conoco gas station in Albuquerque, New Mexico
- Rainbow Conoco: NRHP-listed Conoco gas station in Shelby, Montana
