= First Methodist Episcopal Church, South (Vinita, Oklahoma) =

Historic church in Oklahoma, United States

- First Methodist-Episcopal Church, South
- U.S. National Register of Historic Places
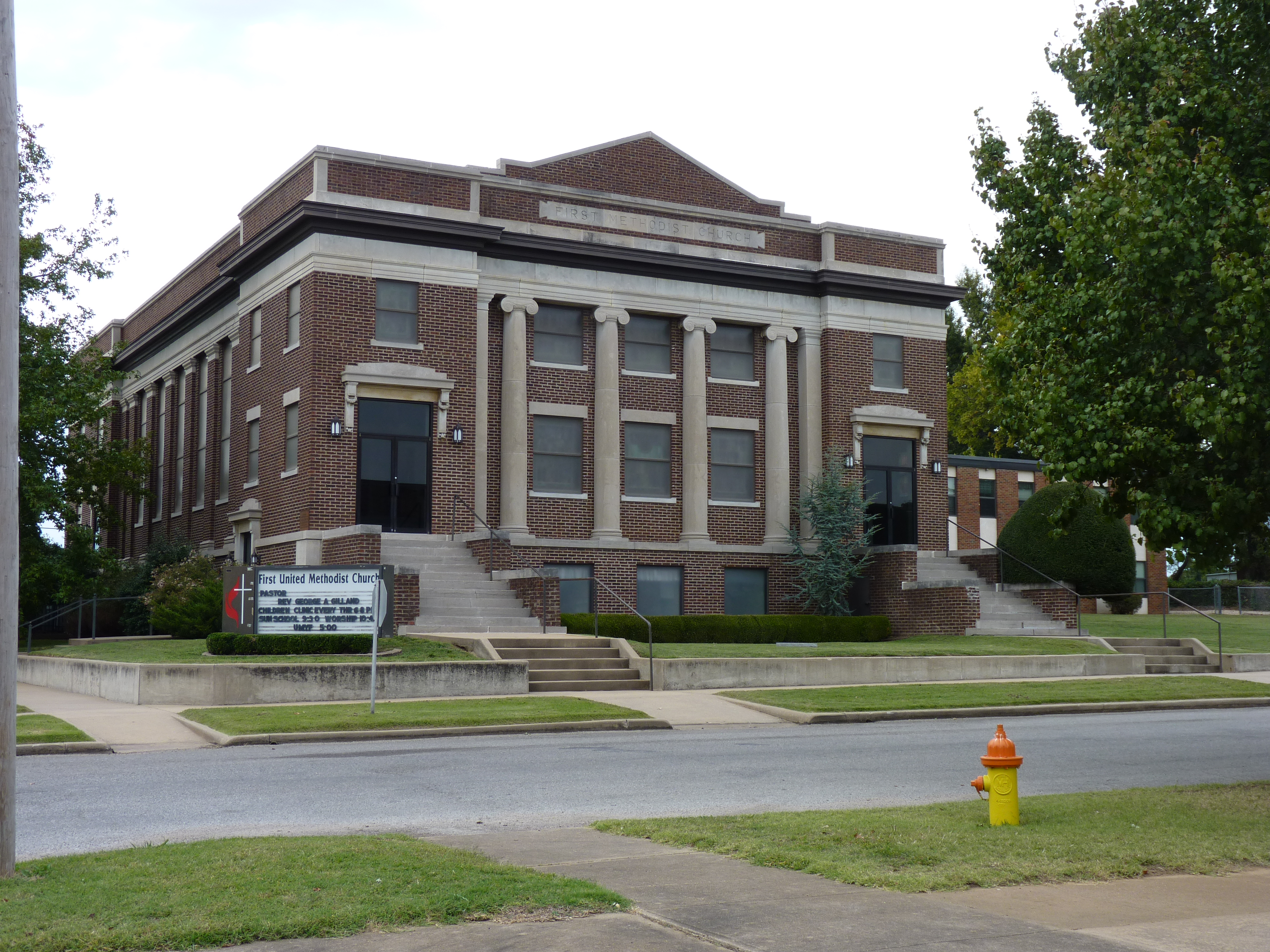

- Location within Oklahoma Location within the United States
- Location: 314 W. Canadian Ave., Vinita, Oklahoma
- Coordinates: 36°38′17″N 95°9′29″W
- Area: less than one acre
- Built: 1920 - 1922
- Architect: Butler & Sanders
- Architectural style: Classical Revival
- NRHP reference No.: 99000673
- Added to NRHP: June 3, 1999

First Methodist-Episcopal Church, South is a historic church building at 314 W. Canadian Avenue in Vinita, Oklahoma, United States. It is still active, and is now officially named First United Methodist Church.

== NRHP registration ==
This building was listed on the National Register of Historic Places (NRHP) on June 3, 1999, under criterion C., which says:

Property embodies the distinctive characteristics of a type, period, or method of construction or represents the work of a master, or possesses high artistic values, or represents a significant and distinguishable entity whose components lack individual distinction.

The NRHP application states that it is Vinita's best, most intact example of Classical Revival architecture, and because it represents a period of public construction in the city. It is the only example of early 20th Century religious architecture. (Note: There were several other churches of this style built in Vinita, but they have been razed and replaced by quite different structures.)

== History ==
Methodist residents of Vinita organized this congregation in 1872, and initially met in a small, wooden structure that was built in 1876 and designated as a community church, used by all Protestant denominations in Vinita. The community church was located at 133 South Thompson Street. It was demolished in 1895, after most denominations had built their own churches in downtown Vinita. The Methodists had moved to a small building on South Scraper Street. Soon thereafter, they built a wooden church building on South Thompson street, where they met until the early 1920s.

By 1920, the congregation had grown to 150, with 160 in the Sunday School, and realized that they needed a larger facility. After deciding to build a new facility on adjacent property on Thompson Street, the church hired the Butler and Sanders architectural firm of Tulsa to design the facility. In mid-November, the church awarded the construction contract to a Vinita firm, Love Brothers Construction Company. The old wood-frame church was donated to an African Methodist-Episcopal congregation. The last ceremony in that structure was held on October 22, 1922. It was then moved to another site at Delaware and South Fourth Street in 1922.

Groundbreaking for the new church building was held December 14, 1920. The cornerstone-laying ceremony was held March 9, 1921. By February, 1922, the exterior was finished and work had begun on the interior. The first event in the new church, a reception, occurred on November 2. The first worship service was held on November 5. The church hosted the annual Eastern Oklahoma Methodist Conference later that November.

In 1953, the church built a two-story education building along the alley about 20 feet (6.1 m) from the northwest corner of the 1922 church. The two buildings had no physical connection until 1993, when a 20 foot (6.1 m) by 30 foot (9.1 m) walkway with glass sides was added, giving shelter to people walking between the two buildings. (Note: Neither the 1953 building nor the 1993 walkway are indicated as either contributing or noncontributing structures in the NRHP application.- ED.)
