= Attucks High School =

- U.S. National Register of Historic Places
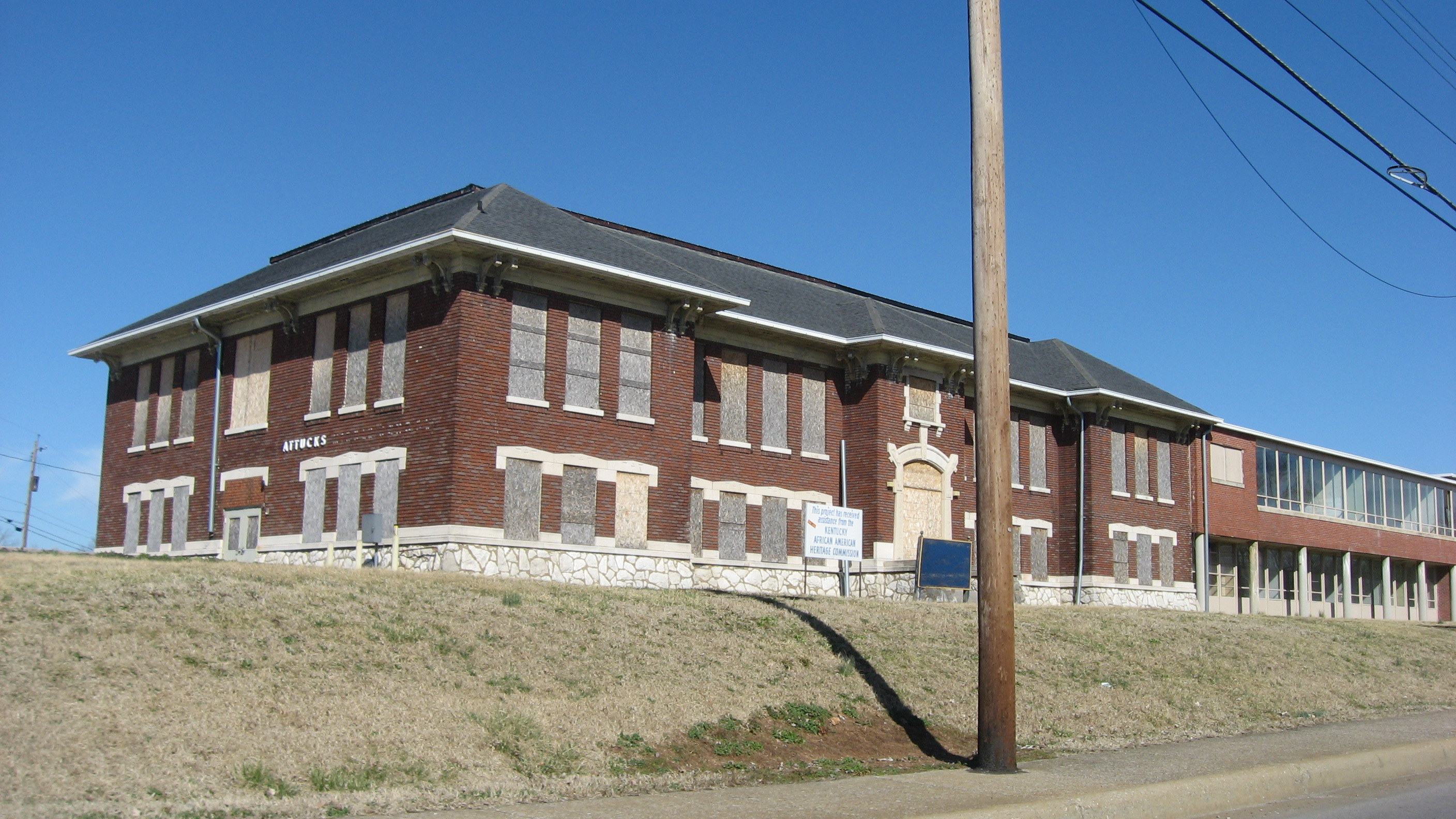

- Location within Kentucky
- Location: 712 1st. St., Hopkinsville, Kentucky
- Coordinates: 36°52′08″N 87°28′41″W
- Area: 2.7 acres (1.1 ha)
- Built: 1916
- Architect: John T. Waller; Forbes Manufacturing Company
- Architectural style: Renaissance, 20th Century Modernism
- NRHP reference No.: 12001199
- Added to NRHP: January 23, 2013

Attucks High School is a former school in Hopkinsville, Kentucky, built in 1916. It was Hopkinsville's first public school for black students. In 1967 the students were sent to Christian County High School and the facility was converted to an integrated middle school in 1967, the Attucks Middle School or simply Attucks School, before being shut down in 1988. It was listed on the National Register of Historic Places in 2013. It is at 712 1st Street.

The school was built partially from brick reclaimed from a former school, the Clay Street School. It was designed by architect John T. Waller and was built by the Forbes Manufacturing Company in a somewhat Italian Renaissance style, at a cost of $17,640. The listing includes two contributing buildings. The school's motto was "Do or die for Attucks High"
