= Attucks Theatre =

Historic arts center in Virginia, US

Crispus Attucks Cultural Center
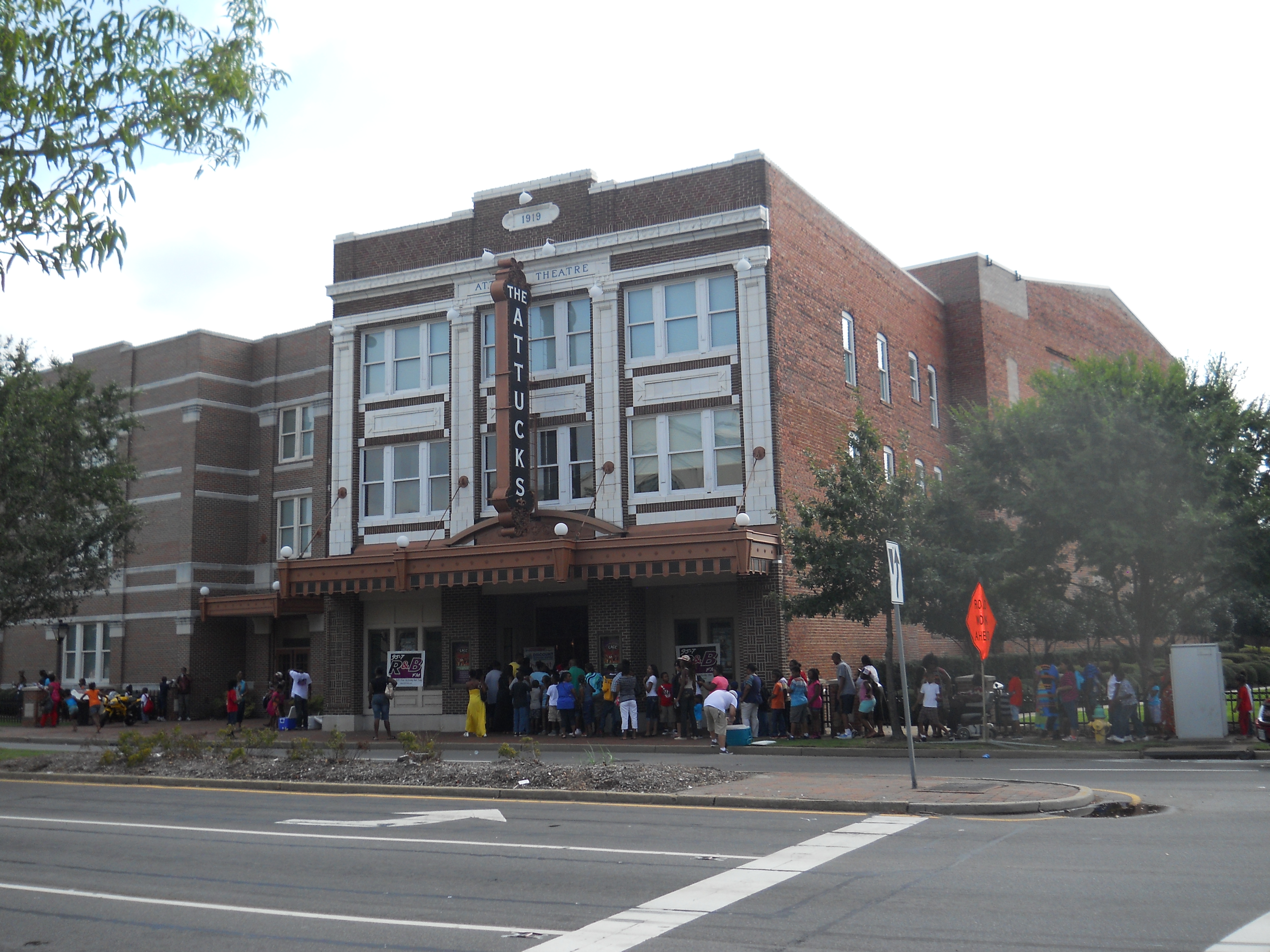
- Theater in 2013
- Interactive map of Crispus Attucks Cultural Center
- Address: 1010 Church Street; Norfolk, Virginia; United States
- Owner: City of Norfolk
- Operator: City of Norfolk

Construction
- Opened: 1919
- Reopened: 2004

Website
- www.sevenvenues.com
- Attucks Theatre
- U.S. National Register of Historic Places
- Virginia Landmarks Register
- Location within Virginia Location within the United States
- Location: 1008-1012 Church St., Norfolk, Virginia
- Coordinates: 36°51′23″N 76°16′45″W
- Area: 0.5 acres (0.20 ha)
- Built: 1919
- Architect: Johnson, Harvey N.
- NRHP reference No.: 82004575
- VLR No.: 122-0074

Significant dates
- Added to NRHP: September 16, 1982
- Designated VLR: July 21, 1981

The Attucks Theatre is a historic theatre located in Norfolk, Virginia. The theatre was financed, designed and constructed by African American entrepreneurs in 1919, and was designed by Harvey Johnson, an African-American architect. The theatre was named in honor of Crispus Attucks, an African American who was the first patriot to lose his life in the Revolutionary War. When it was first opened, Attucks Theatre was known as the "Apollo Theatre of the South". The theater has hosted numerous famous entertainers throughout the early-to-mid-20th century, including Duke Ellington, Cab Calloway, Ella Fitzgerald, Red Foxx, and Louis Armstrong, as well as local stars such as Norfolk's Gary U.S. Bonds and Portsmouth's Ruth Brown.

The theater was added to the National Register of Historic Places on September 16, 1982. After a three-year restoration, the theatre reopened in 2004 as a partnership between the City of Norfolk's Department of Cultural Facilities and the Crispus Attucks Cultural Center. Performers at the theatre since its reopening have included Wynton Marsalis and Audra McDonald.

The theatre is located at the intersection of Church Street and Virginia Beach Boulevard, near Norfolk's entertainment and cultural attractions, including Harbor Park, Harrison Opera House, Norfolk Scope, Wells Theatre and Waterside.
