= Attucks School =

- U.S. National Register of Historic Places
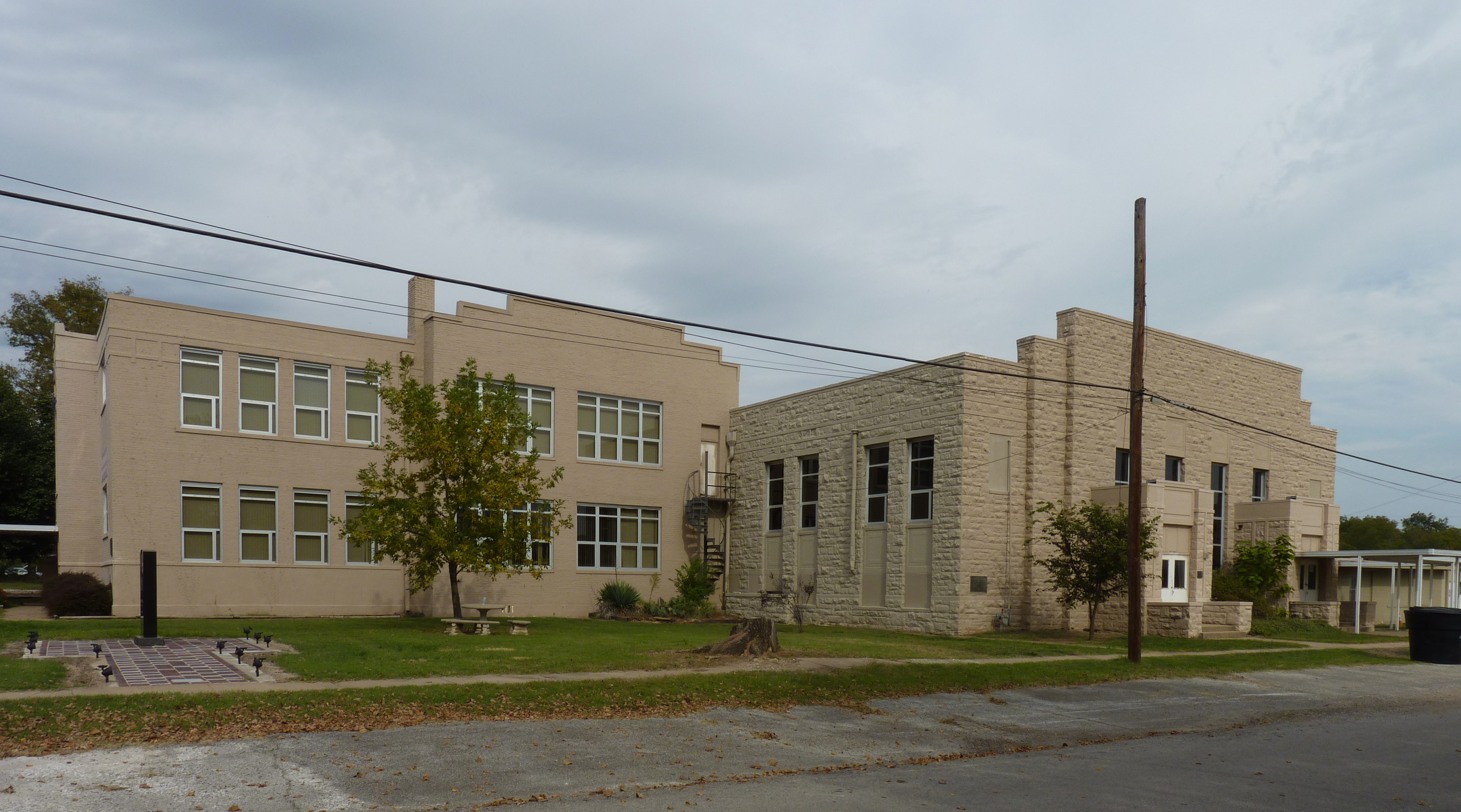

- Location within Oklahoma Location within the United States
- Location: 346 S. 4th, Vinita, Oklahoma
- Coordinates: 36°37′50.2189475″N 95°9′3.8655455″W
- Area: 3 acres (1.2 ha)
- Built: 1916-17
- Architectural style: Art Deco; WPA
- NRHP reference No.: 09000974
- Added to NRHP: December 3, 2009

The Attucks School, also known as Southeast Elementary School or Attucks Alternative Academy, is a site in Vinita, Oklahoma, significant in black heritage.

The building was listed on the U.S. National Register of Historic Places on December 3, 2009. The listing was announced as the featured listing in the National Park Service's weekly list of December 11, 2009.
