= Vinita, Oklahoma =

City in Oklahoma, United States

Vinita, Oklahoma ᏙᏧᏓᏝᎥ (Cherokee)
- City
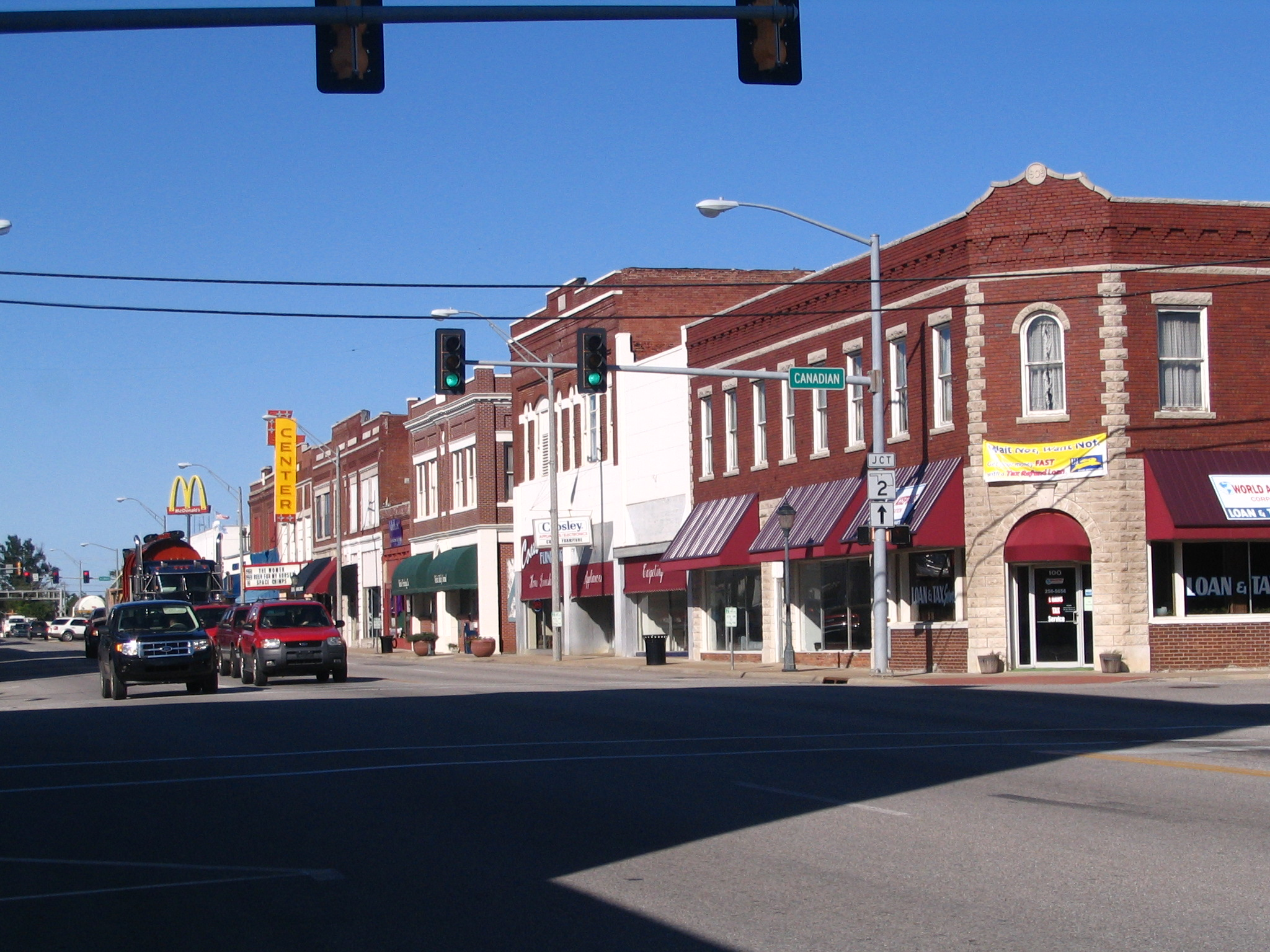
- Downtown Vinita (2008)
- Nickname: "Crossroads to Green Country"
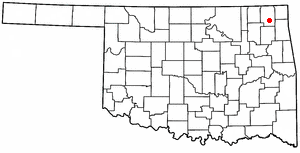
- Location of Vinita within Oklahoma
- Coordinates: 36°37′37″N 95°11′52″W
- Country: United States
- State: Oklahoma
- County: Craig
- Founded: 1870
- Incorporated: 1898
- Founder: Elias Cornelius Boudinot
- Named for: Vinnie Ream

Government
  - Mayor: Josh D. Lee
  - City Administrator: Brian Prince

Area
  - Total: 5.79 sq mi (15.00 km^{2})
  - Land: 5.79 sq mi (15.00 km^{2})
  - Water: 0 sq mi (0.00 km^{2})
- Elevation: 709 ft (216 m)

Population (2020)
  - Total: 5,193
  - Density: 896.7/sq mi (346.2/km^{2})
- Time zone: UTC−6 (CST)
  - Summer (DST): UTC−5 (CDT)
- ZIP Code: 74301
- Area code: 539/918
- FIPS code: 40-77550
- GNIS ID: 2412159
- Website: cityofvinita.com

Vinita (Cherokee: ᏙᏧᏓᏝᎥ, romanized: Dotsudatlav) is a city in and the county seat of Craig County, Oklahoma, United States. As of the 2020 census, the population was 5,193.

== History ==
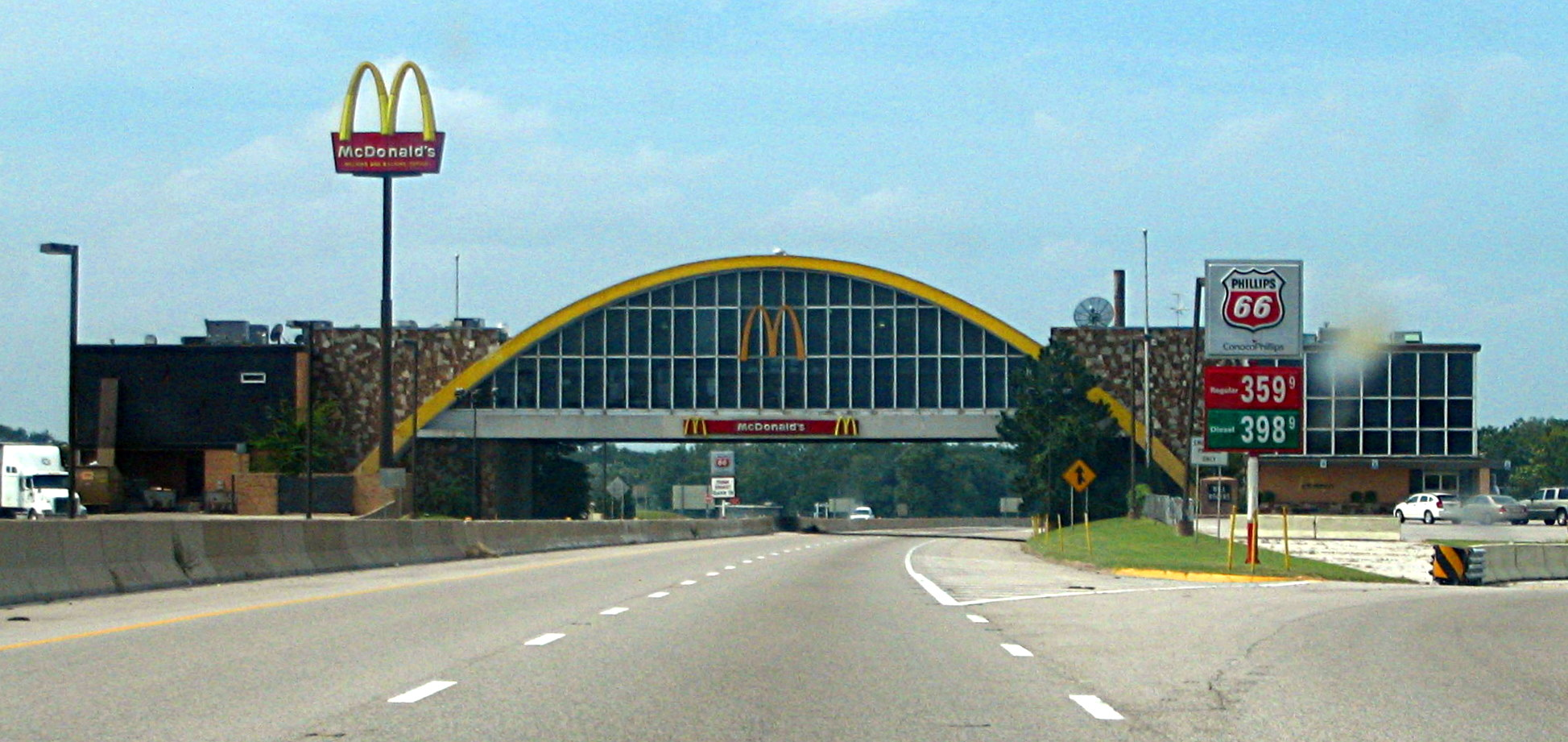
McDonald's bridge restaurant in the Will Rogers Archway over Interstate 44 (2008)

Vinita was founded in 1870 by Elias Cornelius Boudinot. In 1889, gunman and lawman Tom Threepersons was born there. It was the first city in the state with electricity. The city was first named "Downingville", and was a primarily Native American community. It was later renamed "Vinita" after Boudinot's friend, sculptor Vinnie Ream. The city was incorporated in Indian Territory in 1898.

Vinita is along the path of the Texas Road cattle trail, and the later Jefferson Highway of the early National Trail System, both roughly along the route of U.S. Route 69 through Oklahoma today.

The First National Bank opened in 1892, and the local Masonic Lodge was founded in 1894. Newspapers founded before the turn of the 20th Century included Vinita Indian Chieftain (1882), Vinita Leader (1885) and the Daily Indian Chieftain (1899). The Vinita Daily Journal began publication in 1907 and has continued into the 21st Century.

Eastern State Hospital, a state mental health facility, was constructed in 1912 and admitted the first patients in January 1913. It was one of the county's largest employers until its operations were reduced during the 1990s.

The Will Rogers Archway, a service station over the top of Interstate 44, has a McDonald's restaurant that was once the world's largest by area, occupying 29,135 square feet (2,706.7 m^{2}). It was renovated in 2014 and is now smaller. Built in 1957, it is also the world's first bridge restaurant.

== Geography ==
Vinita is located in northeastern Oklahoma, a region of the state known as Green Country. According to the Vinita Chamber of Commerce, the town is often called the "Crossroads to Green Country." It sits at the base of the Ozark Highlands topographical region in a mix of prairie and forest. It is located in southern Craig County.

According to the United States Census Bureau, the city has a total area of 6.0 square miles (15.5 km^{2}), all land. Vinita is in a valley.

Vinita is 64 miles (103 km) northeast of Tulsa and 51 miles (82 km) southwest of Joplin, Missouri, both via Interstate 44.

== Demographics ==
Historical population
Census	Pop.	Note	%±
1900	2,339		—
1910	4,082		74.5%
1920	5,010		22.7%
1930	4,263		−14.9%
1940	5,685		33.4%
1950	5,518		−2.9%
1960	6,027		9.2%
1970	5,847		−3.0%
1980	6,740		15.3%
1990	5,804		−13.9%
2000	6,472		11.5%
2010	5,743		−11.3%
2020	5,193		−9.6%
U.S. Decennial Census

=== 2020 census ===
As of the 2020 census, Vinita had a population of 5,193. The median age was 41.2 years. 23.2% of residents were under the age of 18 and 20.0% of residents were 65 years of age or older. For every 100 females there were 91.0 males, and for every 100 females age 18 and over there were 88.5 males age 18 and over.

95.1% of residents lived in urban areas, while 4.9% lived in rural areas.

There were 2,093 households in Vinita, of which 28.3% had children under the age of 18 living in them. Of all households, 36.3% were married-couple households, 19.6% were households with a male householder and no spouse or partner present, and 35.9% were households with a female householder and no spouse or partner present. About 35.5% of all households were made up of individuals and 17.0% had someone living alone who was 65 years of age or older.

There were 2,545 housing units, of which 17.8% were vacant. Among occupied housing units, 55.7% were owner-occupied and 44.3% were renter-occupied. The homeowner vacancy rate was 3.5% and the rental vacancy rate was 12.9%.

Racial composition as of the 2020 census
Race	Percent
White	56.6%
Black or African American	3.6%
American Indian and Alaska Native	19.6%
Asian	0.5%
Native Hawaiian and Other Pacific Islander	0.1%
Some other race	1.1%
Two or more races	18.5%
Hispanic or Latino (of any race)	3.9%

=== 2000 census ===
As of the 2000 census, there were 6,472 people, 2,381 households, and 1,454 families residing in the city. The population density was 1,486.9 inhabitants per square mile (574.1/km^{2}). There were 2,694 housing units at an average density of 618.9 per square mile (239.0/km^{2}). The racial makeup of the city was 67.32% White, 6.12% African American, 14.86% Native American, 0.28% Asian, 0.03% Pacific Islander, 0.62% from other races, and 10.77% from two or more races. Hispanic or Latino of any race were 1.48% of the population.

There were 2,381 households, out of which 28.9% had children under the age of 18 living with them, 44.9% were married couples living together, 12.9% had a female householder with no husband present, and 38.9% were non-families. 35.7% of all households were made up of individuals, and 19.2% had someone living alone who was 65 years of age or older. The average household size was 2.29 and the average family size was 2.97.

In the city, the population was spread out, with 21.7% under the age of 18, 8.0% from 18 to 24, 30.0% from 25 to 44, 22.4% from 45 to 64, and 17.9% who were 65 years of age or older. The median age was 40 years. For every 100 females, there were 105.1 males. For every 100 females age 18 and over, there were 103.5 males.

The median income for a household in the city was $27,511, and the median income for a family was $33,461. Males had a median income of $26,263 versus $18,182 for females. The per capita income for the city was $13,980. About 14.3% of families and 17.2% of the population were below the poverty line, including 21.0% of those under age 18 and 11.7% of those age 65 or over.

== Economy ==
Early in its history, cattle ranching in the surrounding countryside contributed heavily to Vinita's economy. When Craig County was created at statehood, Vinita was designated as the county seat. City and county governments became significant employers. In 1935, the Grand River Dam Authority (GRDA) was created. GRDA put its headquarters in Vinita. It is still one of the largest employers in the city, along with two of its many customers: Kansas, Arkansas, Missouri, and Oklahoma Electric Company (KAMO) and Northeast Oklahoma Electric Co-op. Other important employers have included trucking companies, tower-building companies, Munsingwear, General Mills, Cinch, Dana Industries, and Hope Industries. (Note: Hope Industries is affiliated with the Home of Hope for the mentally disabled.)

In 2023, a company called American Heartland said it was planning a $2 billion, 1000-acre development containing a 125-acre Disneyland-type theme park. The land was six miles east of Vinita, but the town voted to annex the area in October, 2023. Ground was broken in early November, 2023 on the first phase of the project, being a 350-acre 750-slot RV park with 300 cabins. The project ceased amid lawsuits in July 2025.

== Government ==
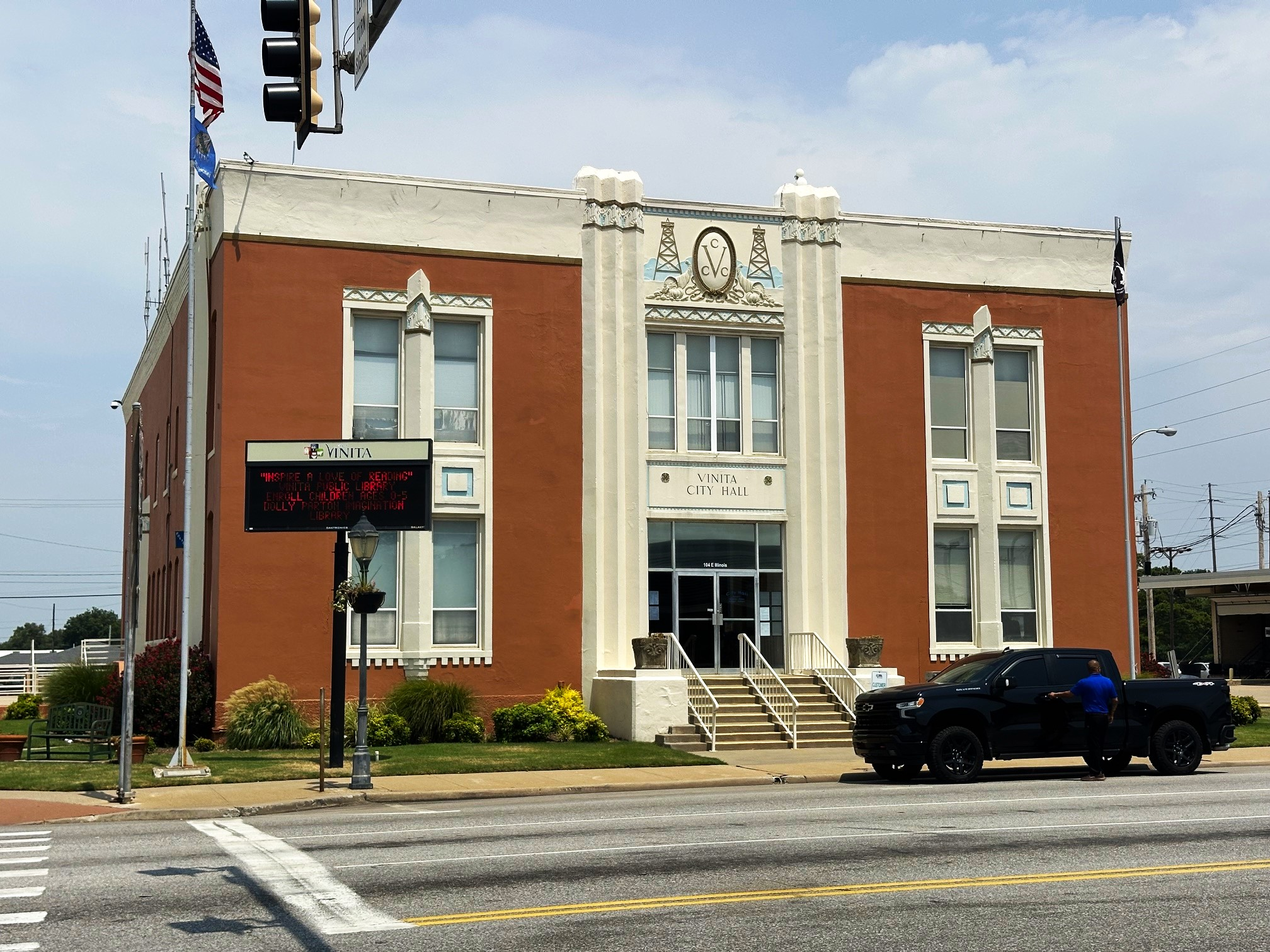
Vinita City Hall in August of 2026

Administrative

- Mayor - Josh D. Lee
- City Administrator- Brian Prince
- City Clerk - Amber Knoll

City Council

- Dale Haire and Linda Lucas - Ward 1
- Jeff Lair and John Swift - Ward 2
- Roger Tyler and Skip Briley - Ward 3
- Terry Young and Kevin Wofford - Ward 4

== Education ==
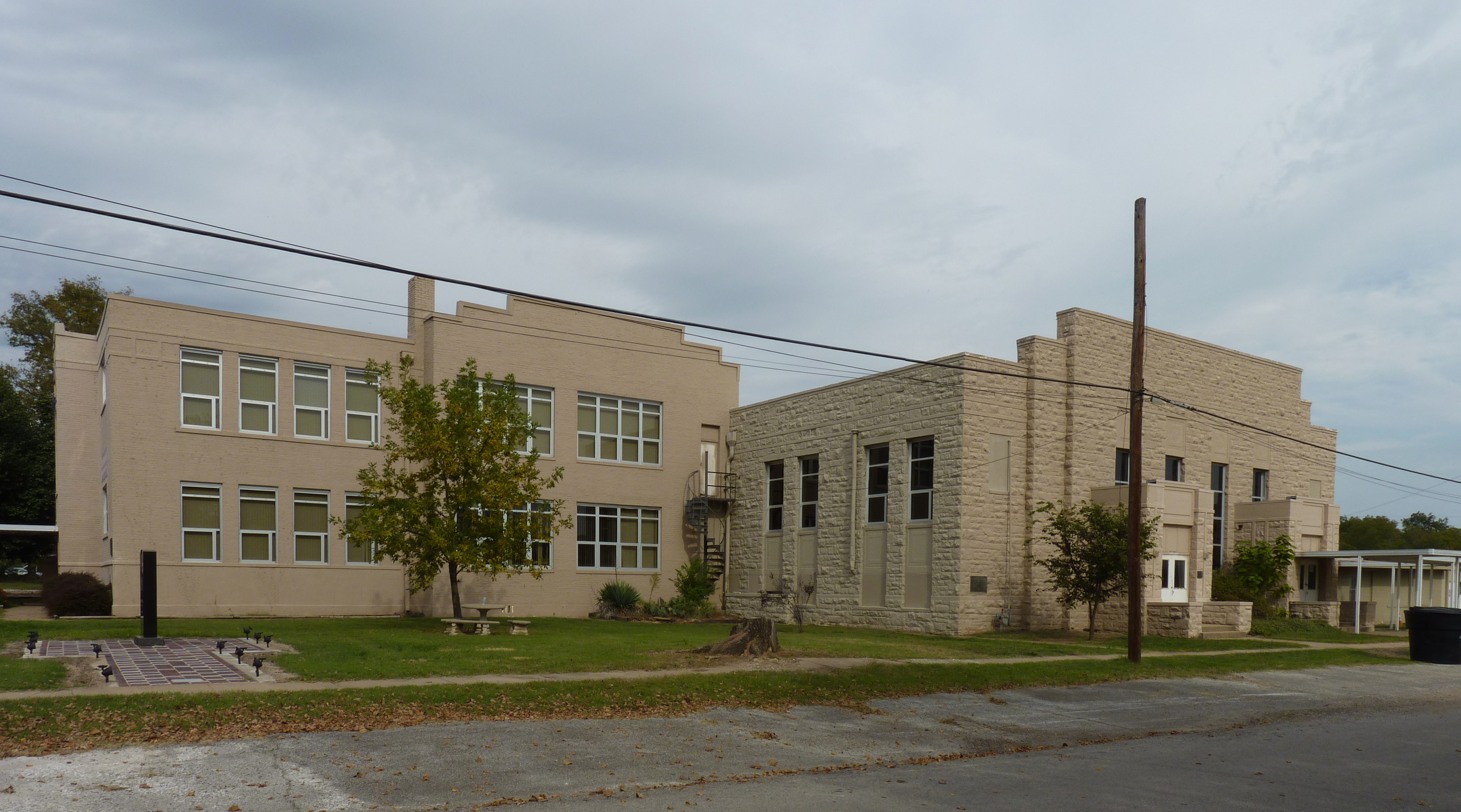
Attucks School (2010)

Almost all of the city limits, excluding some portions of highway, are in Vinita Public Schools.

Educational institutions were begun during Vinita's earliest days. Worcester Academy opened in 1883. The Worcester Academy in Vinita should not be confused with the Worcester Academy that was founded in 1843 in Worcester, Massachusetts. The Massachusetts school is still in operation. It was followed by Willie Halsell College in 1888. Halsell College was originally established as Galloway College, named for Methodist Bishop Charles B. Galloway. The school was renamed in 1891 for Willie Halsell, the deceased daughter of a wealthy rancher, W. E. Halsell, who had rescued the school financially. However, the school again failed and closed permanently in 1908. The Roman Catholic Church operated Sacred Heart Academy, a boarding school, from 1897 until 1968.

== Transportation ==
=== Air ===
Vinita Municipal Airport (FAA Identifier H04) has served the city since 1965. It is about 2 miles (3.2 km) SE of downtown Vinita on 4410 Road. The airport is located next to the famous McDonalds that spans over the Will Rogers Turnpike. Pilots can fly into H04 and walk to the McDonalds.

The airport manager is Allen Goforth. This is a municipally owned facility that primarily handles personal or chartered aircraft. AVGAS is available 24 hours a day. H04 also has a GPS approach.

South Grand Lake Regional Airport (FAA Identifier 1K8) is further to the southeast of Vinita. Starting as a grass strip in 2005, the current facility includes a 75’ x 5,200’ hard-surface runway, runway lights and GPS all weather approach.

Theldor Airfield was a temporary World War II airfield located approximately 4 miles (6.4 km) north-northeast of Vinita. It was closed after the war.

=== Rail ===
Vinita is served by both the Union Pacific Railroad and the BNSF Railway.

== Notable people ==
- Jim Beauchamp (1939–2007) — born in Vinita; MLB baseball player
- Bryan Burk (1968) — born in Vinita, American television personality, actor
- Yvonne Chouteau (1929–2016) — ballerina (one of the "Five Moons")
- Jim Edgar (1946–2025) — born in Vinita, but raised in Charleston, Illinois, was Illinois governor (1991–1999)
- W. H. Kornegay (1865–1935) — came to Vinita in 1891; served on Constitutional Convention; was appointed Justice of the Oklahoma Supreme Court.
- Phil McGraw (1950) — born in Vinita; American television personality, author, psychologist
- Tom Threepersons (1889–1969) — possibly born in Vinita; lawman, gunfighter, and inventor of the Threepersons holster

== National Register of Historic Places ==
External videos
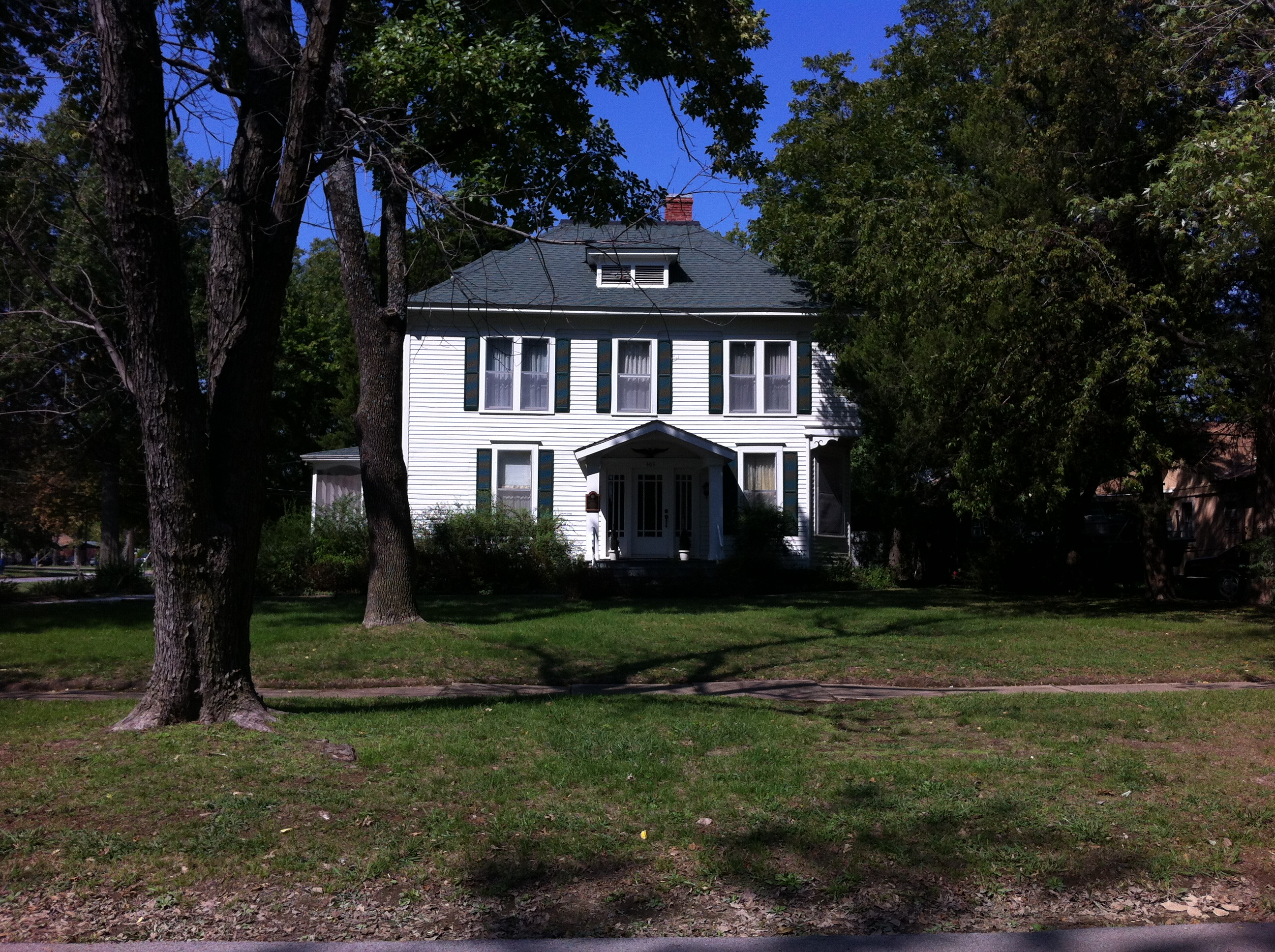
- Cherokee citizen's home listed on National Register of Historic Places, (4:17), Cherokee Nation

Nine of the ten NHRP-listed locations in Craig County are in Vinita:

- Attucks School
- Carselowey House
- Craig County Courthouse
- First Methodist Episcopal Church, South
- Hotel Vinita
- Little Cabin Creek Bridge
- McDougal Filling Station
- Randall Tire Company
- Spraker Service Station (now demolished)

== Gallery ==
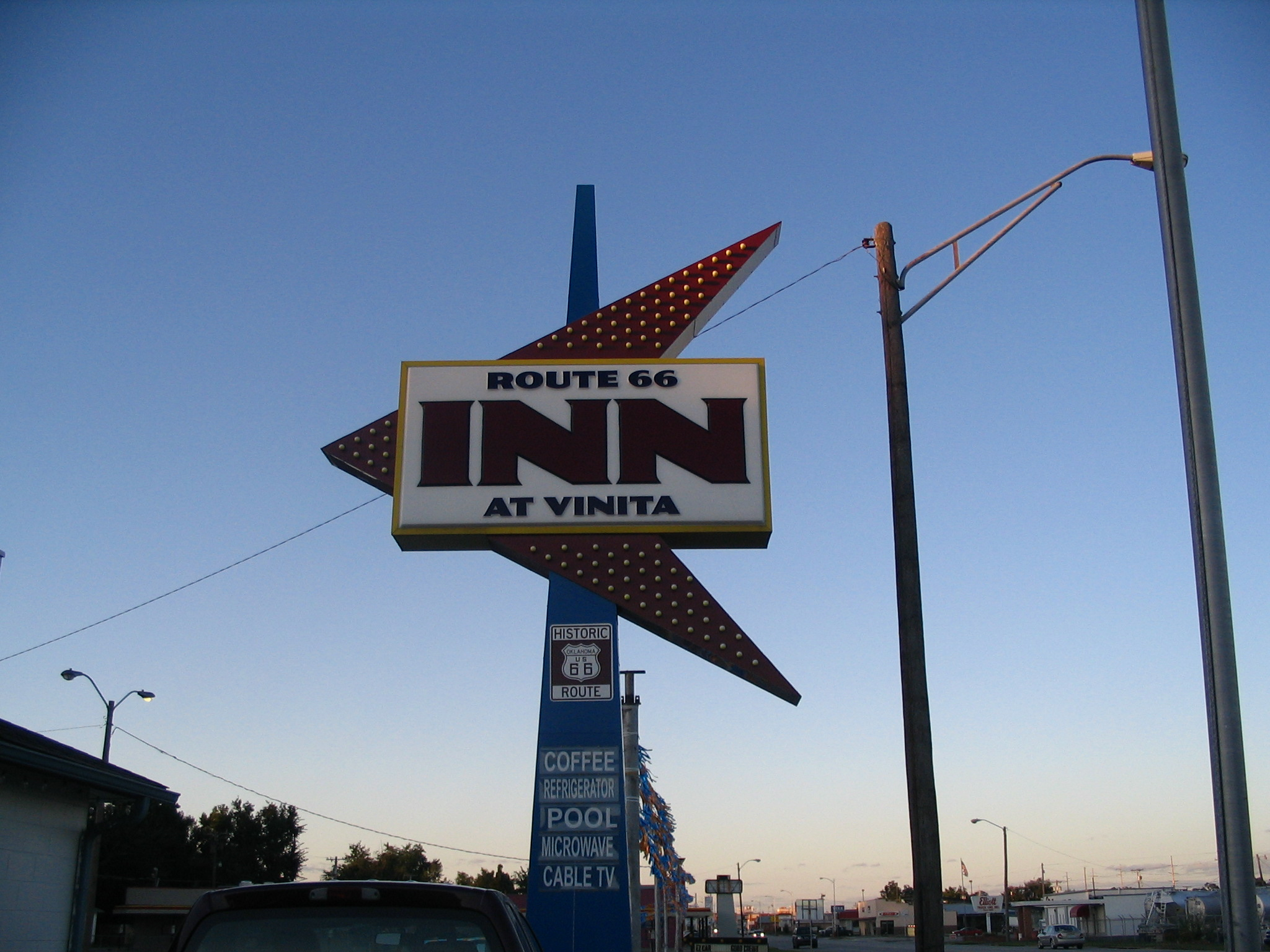
Vinita Inn on Route 66 in Vinita

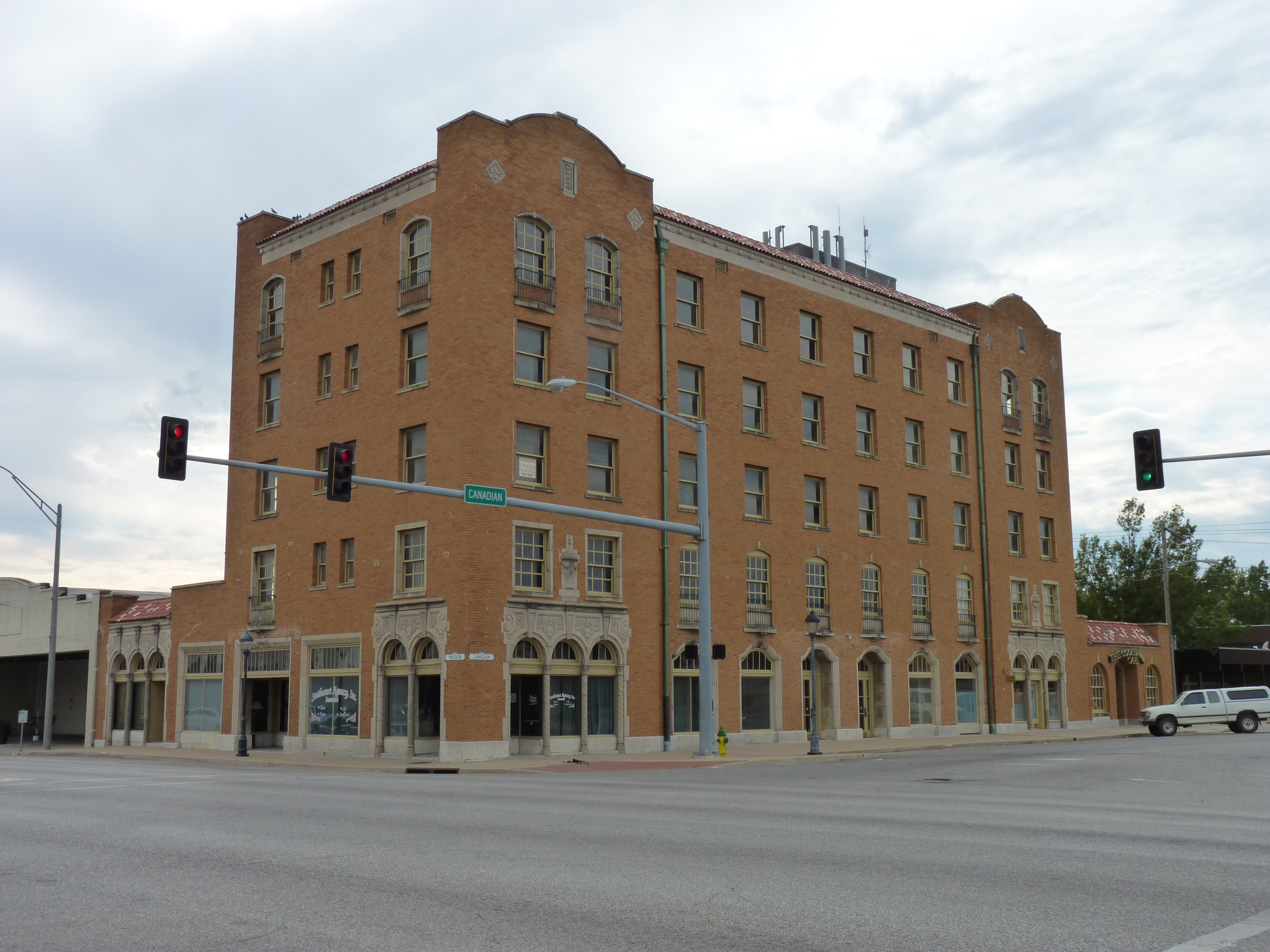
Hotel Vinita (2010)
