= Welty, Oklahoma =

Welty
- Unincorporated community
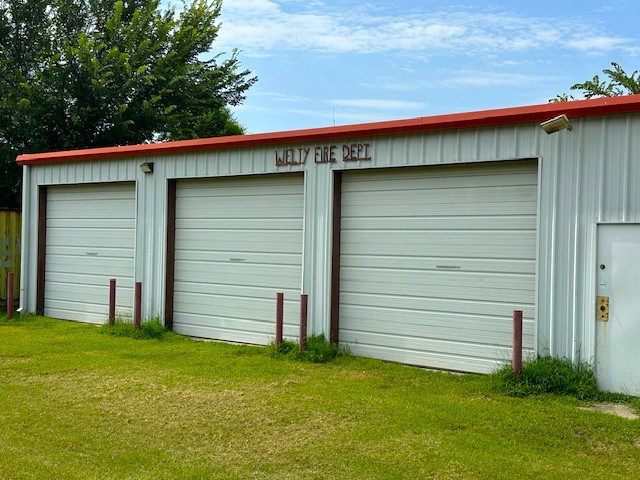
- Welty Fire Dept, July 2025

- Location within the state of Oklahoma Welty (the United States)
- Coordinates: 35°37′09″N 96°24′47″W
- Country: United States
- State: Oklahoma
- County: Okfuskee

Area
  - Total: 2.39 sq mi (6.19 km^{2})
  - Land: 2.37 sq mi (6.14 km^{2})
  - Water: 0.019 sq mi (0.05 km^{2})
- Elevation: 715 ft (218 m)

Population (2020)
  - Total: 131
  - Density: 55.3/sq mi (21.34/km^{2})
- Time zone: UTC-6 (Central (CST))
  - Summer (DST): UTC-5 (CDT)
- FIPS code: 40-80000
- GNIS feature ID: 2805361

Welty is an unincorporated community in Okfuskee County, Oklahoma, United States. As of the 2020 census, Welty had a population of 131. Named for the town developer, Edwin A. Welty, its post office was established October 12, 1905, with Jerimiah D. Wilson as the first postmaster.

Welty is south of Bristow and north of Castle on the west side of Oklahoma State Highway 48 off E 960 Rd.

Okemah Lake, southeast of town, features swimming, boating, hunting, fishing, and camping.

== Demographics ==
=== 2020 census ===
As of the 2020 census, Welty had a population of 131. The median age was 47.4 years. 24.4% of residents were under the age of 18 and 22.9% of residents were 65 years of age or older. For every 100 females there were 104.7 males, and for every 100 females age 18 and over there were 125.0 males age 18 and over.

0.0% of residents lived in urban areas, while 100.0% lived in rural areas.

There were 46 households in Welty, of which 26.1% had children under the age of 18 living in them. Of all households, 54.3% were married-couple households, 17.4% were households with a male householder and no spouse or partner present, and 19.6% were households with a female householder and no spouse or partner present. About 26.1% of all households were made up of individuals and 13.0% had someone living alone who was 65 years of age or older.

There were 55 housing units, of which 16.4% were vacant. The homeowner vacancy rate was 0.0% and the rental vacancy rate was 50.0%.

Racial composition as of the 2020 census
Race	Number	Percent
White	102	77.9%
Black or African American	0	0.0%
American Indian and Alaska Native	14	10.7%
Asian	1	0.8%
Native Hawaiian and Other Pacific Islander	0	0.0%
Some other race	0	0.0%
Two or more races	14	10.7%
Hispanic or Latino (of any race)	1	0.8%
