= National Register of Historic Places listings in Okfuskee County, Oklahoma =

Location of Okfuskee County in Oklahoma

This is a list of the National Register of Historic Places listings in Okfuskee County, Oklahoma.

This is intended to be a complete list of the properties and districts on the National Register of Historic Places in Okfuskee County, Oklahoma, United States. The locations of National Register properties and districts for which the latitude and longitude coordinates are included below, may be seen in a map.

There are 5 properties and districts listed on the National Register in the county, including 1 National Historic Landmark. Another property was once listed but has since been removed.

This National Park Service list is complete through NPS recent listings posted July 10, 2026.

== Current listings ==
	Name on the Register	Image	Date listed	Location	City or town	Description
1	Boley Historic District	Boley Historic District	May 15, 1975 (#75001568)	Roughly bounded by Seward Ave., Walnut and Cedar Sts., and the southern town limits 35°29′34″N 96°28′59″W	Boley	
2	Abe Lincoln Trading Company		December 11, 2023 (#100009607)	North side of Main Street, 175 feet west of Clearview Road; 35°23′49″N 96°11′38″W	Clearview	
3	Okemah Armory	Okemah Armory	June 26, 1998 (#98000734)	405 N. 6th St. 35°26′09″N 96°18′26″W	Okemah	
4	Okfuskee County Courthouse	Okfuskee County Courthouse	August 23, 1984 (#84003377)	209 N. 3rd St. 35°26′00″N 96°18′14″W	Okemah	
5	Weleetka Town Hall and Jail	Weleetka Town Hall and Jail	March 25, 1993 (#93000156)	Junction of State Highway 75 and Seminole; 35°20′08″N 96°08′10″W	Weleetka	

== Former listing ==
	Name on the Register	Image	Date listed	Date removed	Location	City or town	Description
1	Woody Guthrie House	Woody Guthrie House	December 4, 1975 (#75001569)	April 13, 2006	Junction of State Highway 75 and Seminole	Okemah	

== See also ==
- List of National Historic Landmarks in Oklahoma
- National Register of Historic Places listings in Oklahoma
