= IXL, Oklahoma =

Historical freedmen's town in Okfuskee County, Oklahoma

Coordinates: 35°31′21″N 96°23′18″W

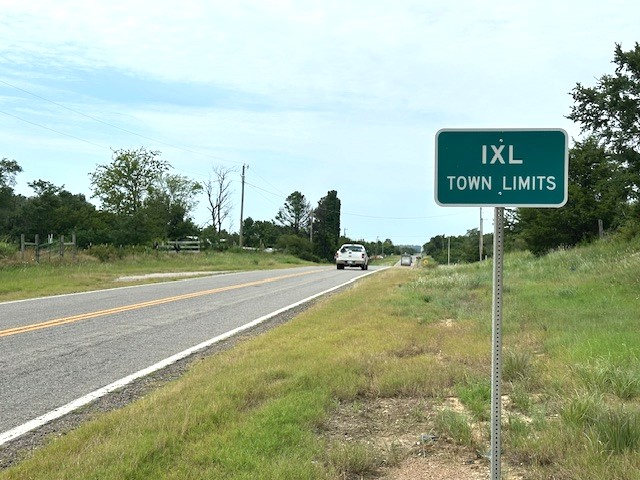
Town limit sign, July 2025

IXL (or I.X.L.) is a historical freedmen's town in Okfuskee County, Oklahoma, United States. It is located on Oklahoma State Highway 48, about 9 miles or 14 kilometers northwest of the county seat of Okemah. Okemah Lake is to its east.

While founded perhaps as early as 1900, it was only incorporated in 2001 and had an estimated population of 59 in 2007. The population was still 59 at the time of the 2020 census.

The source of IXL's unusual name is disputed. A 2012 article on the town's website explained that the name derived from Indian Exchange Land, a reference to the town being on Mvskoke land. Other sources claim that the letters were taken from the names of three men. Some people think it’s an onomatopoeic boast suggesting "I excel."

This town should not be confused with Oklahoma towns in Kay County and Tillman County which also bears the "IXL" name.

== Demographics ==
Historical population
Census	Pop.	Note	%±
2010	51		—
2020	59		15.7%
U.S. Decennial Census

=== 2020 census ===
As of the 2020 census, IXL had a population of 59. The median age was 47.5 years. 20.3% of residents were under the age of 18 and 28.8% of residents were 65 years of age or older. For every 100 females there were 68.6 males, and for every 100 females age 18 and over there were 62.1 males age 18 and over.

0.0% of residents lived in urban areas, while 100.0% lived in rural areas.

There were 31 households in IXL, of which 35.5% had children under the age of 18 living in them. Of all households, 38.7% were married-couple households, 25.8% were households with a male householder and no spouse or partner present, and 32.3% were households with a female householder and no spouse or partner present. About 25.8% of all households were made up of individuals and 9.7% had someone living alone who was 65 years of age or older.

There were 34 housing units, of which 8.8% were vacant. The homeowner vacancy rate was 0.0% and the rental vacancy rate was 7.1%.

Racial composition as of the 2020 census
Race	Number	Percent
White	10	16.9%
Black or African American	36	61.0%
American Indian and Alaska Native	11	18.6%
Asian	0	0.0%
Native Hawaiian and Other Pacific Islander	0	0.0%
Some other race	0	0.0%
Two or more races	2	3.4%
Hispanic or Latino (of any race)	2	3.4%
