= Okfuskee County, Oklahoma =

County in Oklahoma, United States

- County
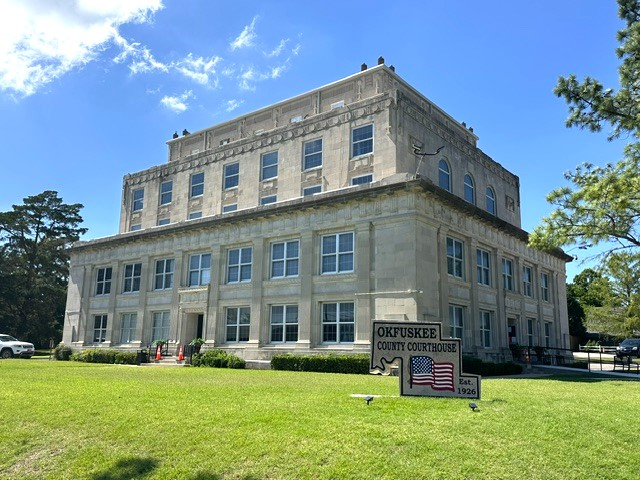
- Okfuskee County Courthouse in Okemah, June 2026

- Location within the U.S. state of Oklahoma
- Coordinates: 35°28′N 96°20′W
- Country: United States
- State: Oklahoma
- Founded: 1907
- Seat: Okemah
- Largest city: Okemah

Area
  - Total: 629 sq mi (1,630 km^{2})
  - Land: 619 sq mi (1,600 km^{2})
  - Water: 10 sq mi (26 km^{2}) 1.6%

Population (2020)
  - Total: 11,310
  - Estimate (2025): 11,451 ▲
  - Density: 18.3/sq mi (7.05/km^{2})
- Congressional district: 2nd

Okfuskee County is a county located in the U.S. state of Oklahoma. As of the 2020 census, its population was 11,310. Its county seat is Okemah. The county is named for a former Muscogee town in present Cleburne County, Alabama, that in turn was named for the Okfuskee, a Muscogee tribe.

== History ==
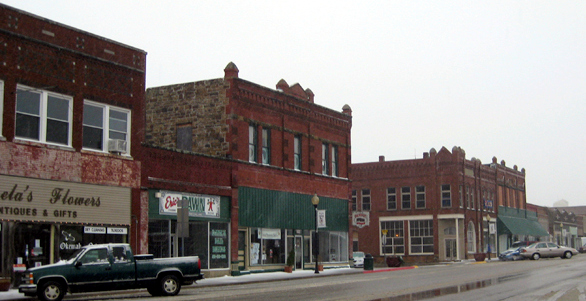
West Broadway Street in Okemah

The area now covered by Okfuskee County was occupied by the Quapaw and Osage tribes until 1825, when they ceded the land to the United States government. The Creeks moved here in the early 1830s and built two towns, Greenleaf and Thlopthlocco. During the Civil War, Thlopthlocco served as headquarters for Confederate Col. Douglas H. Cooper. Greenleaf was where Chief Opothleyahola camped while he tried to retain unity among the Creeks, before leading over 5000 Creeks to Kansas to avoid the war.

After the war, the Creeks were required to free their African American slaves. Many of these people remained in the same area and founded all-black communities. These towns included Boley, Bookertee, Clearview, Chilesville, and Rusk. Okfuskee, a Creek town, grew up around Samuel Checote's trading post after the Civil War.

The St. Louis and San Francisco Railway built a north–south line through this area during 1901–03. The Fort Smith and Western Railroad constructed an east–west line in 1903.

Okfuskee County was created at statehood from the former Creek Nation, and Okemah was designated as the county seat. Oil and gas production began in the county in 1914, when the Prairie Oil and Gas Company completed a well near Paden. Other wells followed elsewhere in the county, creating a population boom that peaked in 1930.

== Geography ==
According to the U.S. Census Bureau, the county has a total area of 629 square miles (1,630 km^{2}), of which 619 square miles (1,600 km^{2}) are land and 10 square miles (26 km^{2}) (1.6%) are covered by water. The county lies within the Sandstone Hills physiographic region. The northeastern part is drained by the Deep Fork of the Canadian River, while the southern part is drained by the North Canadian River.

=== Major highways ===
- Interstate 40
- U.S. Highway 62
- U.S. Highway 75
- State Highway 27
- State Highway 48
- State Highway 56
- State Highway 84
- State Highway 99A

=== Adjacent counties ===
- Creek County (north)
- Okmulgee County (east)
- McIntosh County (southeast)
- Hughes County (south)
- Seminole County (southwest)
- Pottawatomie County (southwest)
- Lincoln County (west)

== Demographics ==
Historical population
Census	Pop.	Note	%±
1910	19,995		—
1920	25,051		25.3%
1930	29,016		15.8%
1940	26,279		−9.4%
1950	16,948		−35.5%
1960	11,706		−30.9%
1970	10,683		−8.7%
1980	11,125		4.1%
1990	11,551		3.8%
2000	11,814		2.3%
2010	12,191		3.2%
2020	11,310		−7.2%
2025 (est.)	11,451	▲	1.2%
U.S. Decennial Census; 1790-1960 1900-1990; 1990-2000 2010

Okfuskee County, Oklahoma – Racial composition
Race (NH = Non-Hispanic)	2020	2010	2000	1990	1980
White alone (NH)	58.3% (6,590)	63.2% (7,699)	64.9% (7,664)	67.2% (7,760)	72.2% (8,032)
Black alone (NH)	6.1% (694)	8.2% (1,001)	10.4% (1,224)	11.5% (1,325)	12.2% (1,356)
American Indian alone (NH)	22.6% (2,559)	19.3% (2,358)	17.9% (2,118)	20% (2,306)	14.5% (1,614)
Asian alone (NH)	0.3% (32)	0.1% (18)	0.1% (9)	0.1% (17)	0.2% (18)
Pacific Islander alone (NH)	0% (0)	0.1% (15)	0% (0)		
Other race alone (NH)	0.3% (33)	0% (3)	0% (1)	0% (3)	0.1% (8)
Multiracial (NH)	9.4% (1,060)	6.1% (741)	5.1% (604)	—	—
Hispanic/Latino (any race)	3% (342)	2.9% (356)	1.6% (194)	1.2% (140)	0.9% (97)

=== 2020 census ===
As of the 2020 census, the county had a population of 11,310. Of the residents, 20.9% were under the age of 18 and 20.0% were 65 years of age or older; the median age was 43.0 years. For every 100 females there were 119.9 males, and for every 100 females age 18 and over there were 121.9 males.

The racial makeup of the county was 59.1% White, 6.2% Black or African American, 22.9% American Indian and Alaska Native, 0.3% Asian, 1.3% from some other race, and 10.2% from two or more races. Hispanic or Latino residents of any race comprised 3.0% of the population.

There were 3,977 households in the county, of which 29.8% had children under the age of 18 living with them and 25.2% had a female householder with no spouse or partner present. About 27.4% of all households were made up of individuals and 13.7% had someone living alone who was 65 years of age or older.

There were 4,778 housing units, of which 16.8% were vacant. Among occupied housing units, 75.5% were owner-occupied and 24.5% were renter-occupied. The homeowner vacancy rate was 1.4% and the rental vacancy rate was 15.0%.

The most reported ancestries in 2020 were:

- The Muscogee (Creek) Nation (19.4%)
- English (12.1%)
- Irish (6.2%)
- German (6.2%)
- African American (5.3%)
- Cherokee (3.4%)
- Mexican (2.3%)
- Choctaw (1.1%)
- Cherokee Nation (1%)

=== 2010 census ===
As of the 2010 United States census, there were 12,191 people living in the county. 64.4% were White, 19.7% Native American, 8.3% Black or African American, 0.2% Asian, 0.1% Pacific Islander, 0.8% of some other race and 6.5% of two or more races. 2.9% were Hispanic or Latino (of any race).

=== 2000 census ===
As of the census of 2000, there were 11,814 people, 4,270 households, and 2,971 families living in the county. The population density was 7/km^{2} (18/mi^{2}). There were 5,114 housing units at an average density of 3/km^{2} (7.8/mi^{2}). The racial makeup of the county was 65.46% White, 10.41% Black or African American, 18.20% Native American, 0.08% Asian, 0.57% from other races, and 5.27% from two or more races. 1.64% of the population were Hispanic or Latino of any race. 92.5% spoke English, 3.5% Muskogee, 2.1% Spanish and 1.3% German as their first language.

There were 4,270 households, out of which 29.20% had children under the age of 18 living with them, 54.10% were married couples living together, 11.20% had a female householder with no husband present, and 30.40% were non-families. 27.80% of all households were made up of individuals, and 14.50% had someone living alone who was 65 years of age or older. The average household size was 2.52 and the average family size was 3.06.

In the county, the population was spread out, with 24.60% under the age of 18, 8.20% from 18 to 24, 26.70% from 25 to 44, 24.20% from 45 to 64, and 16.30% who were 65 years of age or older. The median age was 39 years. For every 100 females there were 106.50 males. For every 100 females age 18 and over, there were 107.90 males.

The median income for a household in the county was $24,324, and the median income for a family was $30,325. Males had a median income of $24,129 versus $17,819 for females. The per capita income for the county was $12,746. About 17.30% of families and 23.00% of the population were below the poverty line, including 29.60% of those under age 18 and 17.50% of those age 65 or over.

== Life expectancy and health ==
Of 3,142 counties in the United States in 2014, the Institute for Health Metrics and Evaluation ranked Okfuskee County 2,986 in the life expectancy at birth of male residents and 3,091 in the life expectancy of female residents. Males in Okfuskee County lived an average of 70.8 years and females lived an average of 75.7 years compared to the national life expectancy of 76.7 for males and 81.5 for females. In the 1980-2014 period, the average life expectancy in Okfuskee County for females decreased by 1.3 years while male longevity increased by 1.9 years compared to the national average for the same period of an increased life expectancy of 4.0 years for women and 6.7 years for men. Okfuskee was one of only a few counties in the United States to suffer a decline in life expectancy for women between 1980 and 2014.

In 2020, the Robert Wood Johnson Foundation ranked Okfuskee country as number 73 of 77 counties in Oklahoma in "health outcomes," as measured by length and quality of life.

== Politics ==
Voter Registration and Party Enrollment as of June 30, 2023
Party	Number of Voters	Percentage
Democratic	2,093	35.29%
Republican	2,957	49.86%
Unaffiliated	881	14.85%
Total	5,931	100%

United States presidential election results for Okfuskee County, Oklahoma
Year	Republican		Democratic		Third party(ies)	
Year	No.	%	No.	%	No.	%
1908	1,297	50.41%	872	33.89%	404	15.70%
1912	651	27.78%	952	40.63%	740	31.58%
1916	670	26.46%	1,337	52.80%	525	20.73%
1920	1,760	48.19%	1,650	45.18%	242	6.63%
1924	1,431	32.90%	2,654	61.03%	264	6.07%
1928	3,612	58.25%	2,513	40.53%	76	1.23%
1932	1,415	21.63%	5,126	78.37%	0	0.00%
1936	2,162	30.66%	4,843	68.68%	47	0.67%
1940	3,001	39.49%	4,574	60.19%	24	0.32%
1944	2,177	39.75%	3,291	60.09%	9	0.16%
1948	1,624	32.75%	3,335	67.25%	0	0.00%
1952	2,469	47.08%	2,775	52.92%	0	0.00%
1956	2,299	49.65%	2,331	50.35%	0	0.00%
1960	2,510	56.05%	1,968	43.95%	0	0.00%
1964	1,629	35.93%	2,905	64.07%	0	0.00%
1968	1,686	37.94%	1,777	39.99%	981	22.07%
1972	2,862	66.73%	1,328	30.96%	99	2.31%
1976	1,630	37.69%	2,663	61.57%	32	0.74%
1980	2,126	48.31%	2,177	49.47%	98	2.23%
1984	2,443	58.94%	1,684	40.63%	18	0.43%
1988	1,851	45.17%	2,209	53.90%	38	0.93%
1992	1,580	34.13%	2,141	46.24%	909	19.63%
1996	1,380	34.41%	2,074	51.72%	556	13.87%
2000	1,910	50.42%	1,814	47.89%	64	1.69%
2004	2,542	59.32%	1,743	40.68%	0	0.00%
2008	2,643	64.10%	1,480	35.90%	0	0.00%
2012	2,335	65.02%	1,256	34.98%	0	0.00%
2016	2,800	71.01%	943	23.92%	200	5.07%
2020	3,058	75.73%	896	22.19%	84	2.08%
2024	3,080	77.23%	854	21.41%	54	1.35%

== Communities ==
=== City ===
- Okemah (county seat)

=== Towns ===
- Bearden
- Boley
- Castle
- Clearview
- IXL
- Paden
- Weleetka

=== Census-designated place ===
- Welty

=== Unincorporated communities ===
- Last Chance
- Mason
- Pharoah

== NRHP sites ==
The following sites in Okfuskee County are listed on the National Register of Historic Places:

- Boley Historic District, Boley
- Okemah Armory, Okemah
- Okfuskee County Courthouse, Okemah
- Weleetka Town Hall and Jail, Weleetka

== In popular culture ==
Okfuskee was the home county of American folk icon Woody Guthrie, who was born in Okemah. Guthrie refers to Okfuskee in one of his lost lyrics, "Way Over Yonder In the Minor Key." The lyrics were set to music by Billy Bragg and Wilco for their 1998 collaboration, Mermaid Avenue.

== See also ==
- Lynching of Laura and L. D. Nelson
