= Last Chance, Oklahoma =

Populated place in Oklahoma, US

Coordinates: 35°32′12″N 96°15′52″W

Last Chance (or Morse) is a populated place in northeast Okfuskee County, Oklahoma, United States.

The community is on State Highway 56 approximately 7.5 miles north-northeast of Okemah.

Morse is old enough to appear on a 1911 Rand McNally map of the county.
