= Castle, Oklahoma =

- Town
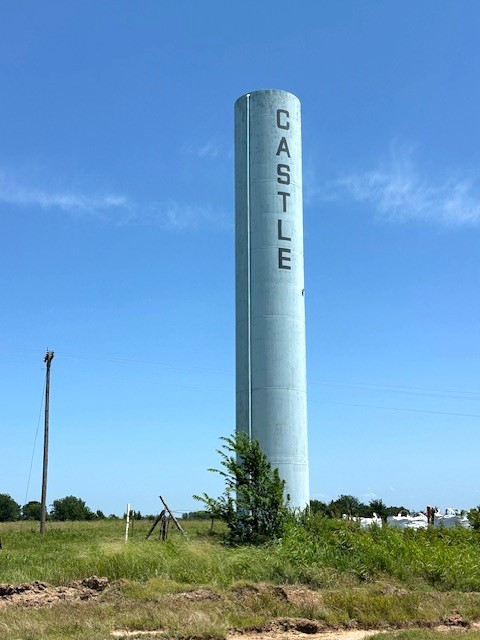
- Water tower at Castle, July 2025

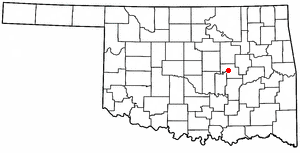
- Location of Castle, Oklahoma
- Coordinates: 35°28′18″N 96°23′31″W
- Country: United States
- State: Oklahoma
- County: Okfuskee

Area
  - Total: 1.55 sq mi (4.02 km^{2})
  - Land: 1.54 sq mi (4.00 km^{2})
  - Water: 0.0077 sq mi (0.02 km^{2})
- Elevation: 938 ft (286 m)

Population (2020)
  - Total: 169
  - Density: 109.5/sq mi (42.27/km^{2})
- Time zone: UTC-6 (Central (CST))
  - Summer (DST): UTC-5 (CDT)
- ZIP code: 74833
- Area codes: 539/918
- FIPS code: 40-12750
- GNIS feature ID: 2413178

Castle is a town in Okfuskee County, Oklahoma, United States. A post office was established February 25, 1903, and the town was named for the first postmaster, Manford B. Castle. The population was 169 at the 2020 Census.

== Geography ==
Castle is situated six miles northwest of the county seat, Okemah. It is close to the intersection of US-62 and SH-48. Okemah Lake is to the northeast.

According to the United States Census Bureau, the town has a total area of 0.2 square miles (0.52 km^{2}), all land.

== Demographics ==
Historical population
Census	Pop.	Note	%±
1910	294		—
1920	381		29.6%
1930	283		−25.7%
1940	242		−14.5%
1950	144		−40.5%
1960	149		3.5%
1970	212		42.3%
1980	130		−38.7%
1990	94		−27.7%
2000	122		29.8%
2010	106		−13.1%
2020	169		59.4%
U.S. Decennial Census

=== 2020 census ===
As of the 2020 census, Castle had a population of 169. The median age was 41.8 years. 21.9% of residents were under the age of 18 and 16.0% of residents were 65 years of age or older. For every 100 females there were 96.5 males, and for every 100 females age 18 and over there were 94.1 males age 18 and over.

0.0% of residents lived in urban areas, while 100.0% lived in rural areas.

There were 63 households in Castle, of which 44.4% had children under the age of 18 living in them. Of all households, 46.0% were married-couple households, 20.6% were households with a male householder and no spouse or partner present, and 31.7% were households with a female householder and no spouse or partner present. About 27.0% of all households were made up of individuals and 9.6% had someone living alone who was 65 years of age or older.

There were 68 housing units, of which 7.4% were vacant. The homeowner vacancy rate was 0.0% and the rental vacancy rate was 18.2%.

Racial composition as of the 2020 census
Race	Number	Percent
White	108	63.9%
Black or African American	7	4.1%
American Indian and Alaska Native	39	23.1%
Asian	0	0.0%
Native Hawaiian and Other Pacific Islander	0	0.0%
Some other race	0	0.0%
Two or more races	15	8.9%
Hispanic or Latino (of any race)	3	1.8%

=== 2000 census ===
As of the 2000 census, there were 122 people, 48 households, and 37 families residing in the town. The population density was 691.3 inhabitants per square mile (266.9/km^{2}). There were 58 housing units at an average density of 328.6 per square mile (126.9/km^{2}). The racial makeup of the town was 77.05% White, 1.64% African American, 19.67% Native American, 0.82% from other races, and 0.82% from two or more races. Hispanic or Latino of any race were 0.82% of the population.

There were 48 households, out of which 27.1% had children under the age of 18 living with them, 66.7% were married couples living together, 6.3% had a female householder with no husband present, and 22.9% were non-families. 22.9% of all households were made up of individuals, and 12.5% had someone living alone who was 65 years of age or older. The average household size was 2.54 and the average family size was 2.92.

In the town, the population was spread out, with 24.6% under the age of 18, 11.5% from 18 to 24, 22.1% from 25 to 44, 26.2% from 45 to 64, and 15.6% who were 65 years of age or older. The median age was 39 years. For every 100 females, there were 100.0 males. For every 100 females age 18 and over, there were 114.0 males.

The median income for a household in the town was $24,688, and the median income for a family was $24,688. Males had a median income of $16,250 versus $16,563 for females. The per capita income for the town was $10,261. There were 13.8% of families and 16.5% of the population living below the poverty line, including 14.7% of under eighteens and 18.2% of those over 64.
