= Weleetka, Oklahoma =

Weleetka, Oklahoma Ue-Lētkv (Creek)
- Town
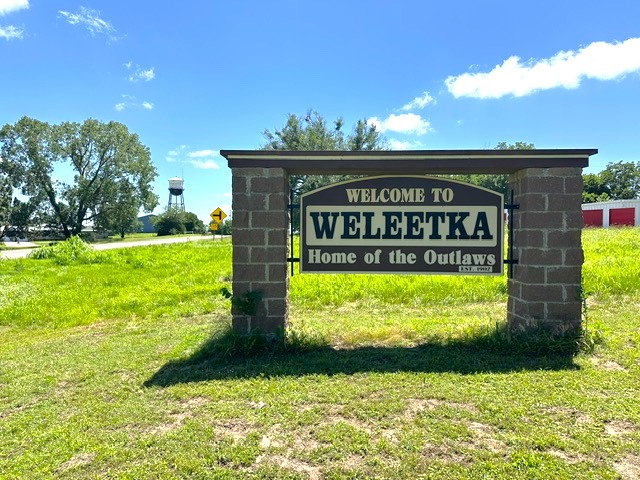
- Welcome sign at Weleetka in June of 2026

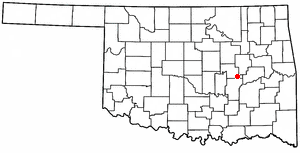
- Location of Weleetka, Oklahoma
- Coordinates: 35°20′24″N 96°08′10″W
- Country: United States
- State: Oklahoma
- County: Okfuskee

Area
  - Total: 0.66 sq mi (1.71 km^{2})
  - Land: 0.66 sq mi (1.71 km^{2})
  - Water: 0 sq mi (0.00 km^{2})
- Elevation: 728 ft (222 m)

Population (2020)
  - Total: 806
  - Density: 1,221.9/sq mi (471.78/km^{2})
- Time zone: UTC-6 (Central (CST))
  - Summer (DST): UTC-5 (CDT)
- ZIP code: 74880
- Area codes: 405/572
- FIPS code: 40-79800
- GNIS feature ID: 2413463

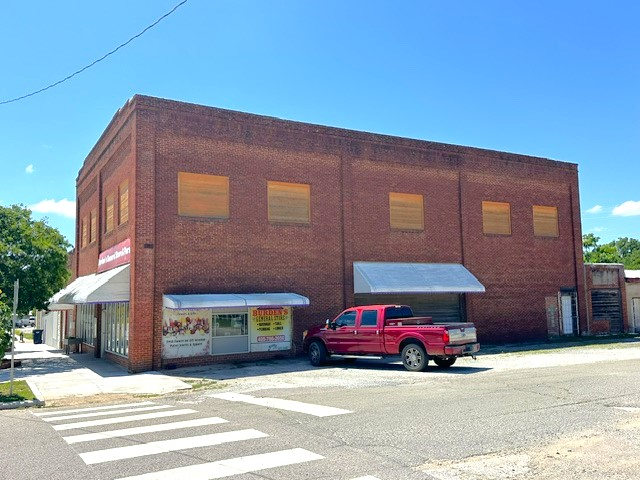
A 1909 building at 202 W. 9th (aka “Main Street”) in Weleetka, June 2026

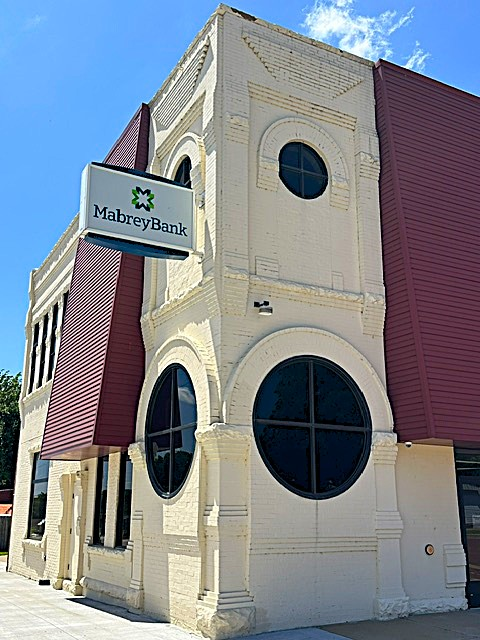
A bank has occupied this building in Weleetka since 1902.

Weleetka (Creek: Ue-Lētkv) is a town in Okfuskee County, Oklahoma, United States. It is approximately 10 miles (16 km) southeast of Okemah, the county seat. The name is a Creek word meaning "running water." The population was 806 at the time of the 2020 census.

== History ==
According to the Encyclopedia of Oklahoma History and Culture, the present town of Weleetka was founded by three men from other communities who were having difficulty surviving in the newspaper business. These men, George F. Clarke of Vinita, Lake Moore of Fairland and John Jacobs of Holdenville, decided in 1899 to form a partnership and find a new town where they might find prosperity together. They had already learned that the St. Louis and San Francisco Railway (SL&SF or "Frisco") was building a line southward from Sapulpa, Indian Territory, to Denison, Texas. Clarke and Moore knew that the Fort Smith and Western Railway was laying a line westward from Indian Territory to Guthrie, in Oklahoma Territory. The partners decided to establish a town at the junction of the two railroads. The partners selected a suitable town site on a hill just north of the Canadian River that was owned by Martha Lowe, a Creek Indian who had received an allotment. Someone suggested that the partners name the new site, "Weleetka", a Creek word that meant "running water" in English.

The partners began selling townsite lots for 40 dollars each on February 10, 1902. Within a day, they had netted enough to pay Mrs. Lowe for her land as well as cover their other expenses. On the following day, the First Bank of Weleetka opened for business. By the time it closed that evening, it held $3,000 in deposits. Business continued to be brisk, and a Weleetka post office was established on March 14, 1902.

The surrounding area was mostly devoted to agriculture, where farmers produced cotton, wheat, oats, alfalfa, fruits, vegetables, peanuts, and pecans. Later, it became known for production of oil and gas. The town had a population of 1,020 at statehood in 1907. By 1930, it could boast of having 2,042 people. It also had two hotels, three cotton gins, a cotton compress, three drug stores, an opera house, and a mercantile company.

Weleetka was once a major railroad town, serving as the division point for the Fort Smith and Western Railway. All train crews changed out in Weleetka; the town also housed major shops and repair facilities for the steam locomotives. Headquartered in Fort Smith, Arkansas, the Fort Smith and Western was a railroad that operated in the states of Arkansas and Oklahoma. The railroad's main line extended 217 miles, from Ft. Smith through Weleetka to Guthrie. The Fort Smith and Western owned a subsidiary, St. Louis, El Reno and Western, which began operating 42 miles between Guthrie and El Reno, Oklahoma in June 1904. The railroad also acquired 32.5 miles of trackage rights over the Missouri-Kansas-Texas Railroad from Fallis, Oklahoma to Oklahoma City.

The railroad supported much of the business and hotels of the city in the first half of the 1900s. Trains entering town from the East were switched and broken down in Weleetka, and dispatched northwest for either Oklahoma City, Guthrie or El Reno. Due to the railroad yard in Weleetka, the single westbound train could thus become two westbound trains. The reverse was true for eastbound trains. Weleetka was vital to the life of the railroad. The railroad provided regular passenger service and at one time boasted through Pullman sleeping cars to and from St. Louis and Oklahoma City. The route of the FS&W served no major population centers, but did serve major coal mining operations in eastern Oklahoma at Coal Creek, Bokoshe, and McCurtain. Other towns served included Crowder, Okemah, Boley, Prague, Vernon, Indianola and Meridian. A major portion of the road's freight traffic was metallurgical-grade coal from San Bois Coal Company mines near McCurtain. As coal traffic declined, an oil discovery near Okemah brought additional traffic, which postponed the abandonment of the railroad. The Missouri-Kansas-Texas Railroad withdrew trackage rights between Fallis and Oklahoma City in January 1939 after FS&W defaulted on rental fees, and when the Fort Smith and Western ceased operations on February 9, 1939, Weleetka lost its major employer.

Beginning in 1930, both cotton production and railroad service declined, followed by a steady loss of population. Weleetka remained a trading center for its area. The weekly Weleetka American newspaper ran from 1902 to 1975. Ten churches and a school system served the community. The Weleetka Town Hall and Jail were included in the National Register of Historic Places listings in Okfuskee County, Oklahoma (NR 93000156).

== Geography ==
It is 10 miles (16 km) southeast of the county seat, Okemah. The townsite is on a horseshoe bend of the North Canadian River.

According to the United States Census Bureau, the town has a total area of 0.7 square miles (1.8 km^{2}), all land.

== Demographics ==
Historical population
Census	Pop.	Note	%±
1910	1,229		—
1920	1,588		29.2%
1930	2,042		28.6%
1940	1,904		−6.8%
1950	1,548		−18.7%
1960	1,231		−20.5%
1970	1,199		−2.6%
1980	1,195		−0.3%
1990	1,112		−6.9%
2000	1,014		−8.8%
2010	998		−1.6%
2020	806		−19.2%
U.S. Decennial Census

=== 2020 census ===
As of the 2020 census, Weleetka had a population of 806. The median age was 47.8 years. 19.5% of residents were under the age of 18 and 22.3% of residents were 65 years of age or older. For every 100 females there were 114.4 males, and for every 100 females age 18 and over there were 116.3 males age 18 and over.

0.0% of residents lived in urban areas, while 100.0% lived in rural areas.

There were 292 households in Weleetka, of which 26.0% had children under the age of 18 living in them. Of all households, 36.6% were married-couple households, 27.7% were households with a male householder and no spouse or partner present, and 33.2% were households with a female householder and no spouse or partner present. About 36.3% of all households were made up of individuals and 17.8% had someone living alone who was 65 years of age or older.

There were 354 housing units, of which 17.5% were vacant. The homeowner vacancy rate was 2.4% and the rental vacancy rate was 7.4%.

Racial composition as of the 2020 census
Race	Number	Percent
White	406	50.4%
Black or African American	53	6.6%
American Indian and Alaska Native	237	29.4%
Asian	0	0.0%
Native Hawaiian and Other Pacific Islander	0	0.0%
Some other race	12	1.5%
Two or more races	98	12.2%
Hispanic or Latino (of any race)	22	2.7%

=== 2000 census ===
As of the census of 2000, there were 1,014 people, 368 households, and 235 families residing in the town. The population density was 1,463.7 inhabitants per square mile (565.1/km^{2}). There were 450 housing units at an average density of 649.6 per square mile (250.8/km^{2}). The racial makeup of the town was 60.36% White, 6.31% African American, 23.77% Native American, 0.10% Asian, 1.08% from other races, and 8.38% from two or more races. Hispanic or Latino of any race were 2.66% of the population.

There were 368 households, out of which 26.9% had children under the age of 18 living with them, 41.0% were married couples living together, 18.2% had a female householder with no husband present, and 36.1% were non-families. 34.2% of all households were made up of individuals, and 19.0% had someone living alone who was 65 years of age or older. The average household size was 2.51 and the average family size was 3.20.

In the town, the population was spread out, with 25.9% under the age of 18, 8.3% from 18 to 24, 22.3% from 25 to 44, 23.4% from 45 to 64, and 20.1% who were 65 years of age or older. The median age was 40 years. For every 100 females, there were 90.6 males. For every 100 females age 18 and over, there were 91.6 males.

The median income for a household in the town was $19,141, and the median income for a family was $26,917. Males had a median income of $23,542 versus $15,227 for females. The per capita income for the town was $12,103. About 22.3% of families and 27.9% of the population were below the poverty line, including 32.2% of those under age 18 and 18.7% of those age 65 or over.

== Notable person ==
- Weleetka is home to country singer Amber Hayes.
