= Piedmont, Oklahoma =

City in Oklahoma, US

- City
- City of Piedmont
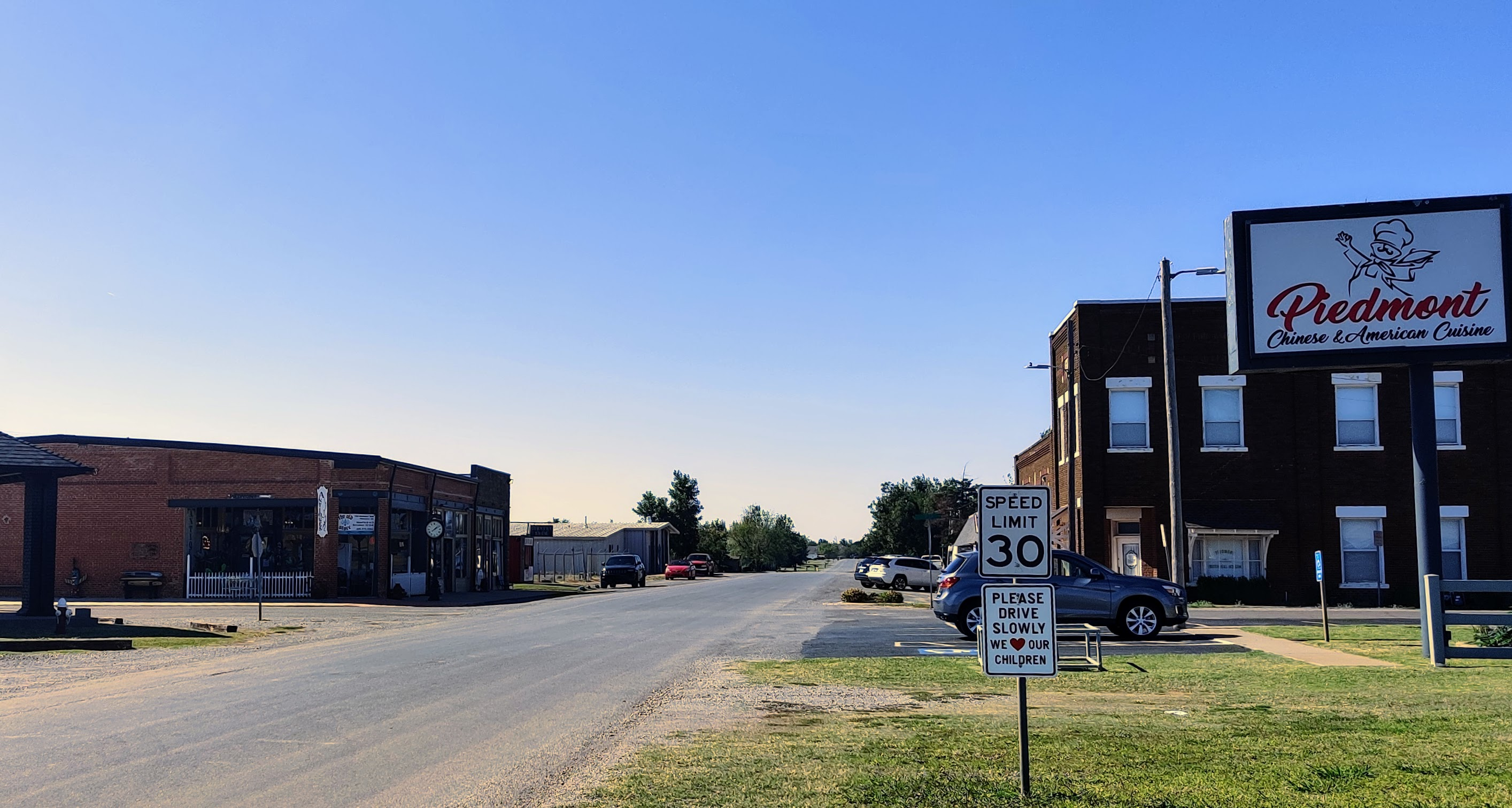

- Flag

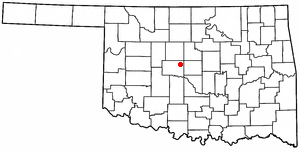
- Location of Piedmont, Oklahoma
- Coordinates: 35°40′27″N 97°45′09″W
- Country: United States
- State: Oklahoma
- Counties: Canadian, Kingfisher

Government
  - Mayor: Kurt Mayabb
  - City Manager: Joshua A. Williams

Area
  - Total: 43.85 sq mi (113.58 km^{2})
  - Land: 43.40 sq mi (112.40 km^{2})
  - Water: 0.46 sq mi (1.18 km^{2})
- Elevation: 1,217 ft (371 m)

Population (2020)
  - Total: 7,402
  - Density: 170.6/sq mi (65.85/km^{2})
- Time zone: UTC-6 (Central (CST))
  - Summer (DST): UTC-5 (CDT)
- ZIP code: 73078
- Area code: 405
- FIPS code: 40-58700
- GNIS feature ID: 2411419
- Website: www.piedmont-ok.gov

Piedmont is a city in the counties of Canadian and Kingfisher, Oklahoma, United States. As of the 2020 census, Piedmont has a population of 7,402. Piedmont is a home rule city served by a council–manager government.

== History ==
The city of Piedmont was founded on land claimed during the Unassigned Land Run of April 22, 1889. The town was founded in 1903 by Dr. E. H. Long.

Piedmont's success was spurred by the now-defunct St. Louis, El Reno and Western Railway that extended a line from Guthrie to El Reno, which allowed it to become an agricultural market center. However, the railroad ceased to operate in 1924.

Piedmont remained a small but stable rural community for the first half of the 20th century. Starting in the 1970s, the town became an increasingly popular bedroom community for those working in nearby Oklahoma City. Development of the "Northwest Expressway" (Oklahoma State Highway 3) resulted in population growth of 124%.

=== 2011 tornado ===
On May 24, 2011, Piedmont and surrounding areas were struck by a large, long-tracked and exceptionally intense EF5 tornado, which destroyed about 180 homes in the city, caused over $20 million in property damage, and killed two children.

== Geography ==
Piedmont is located in the northeastern corner of Canadian County 10 miles (16 km) north of Yukon. It is bordered to the south by the Oklahoma City limits. The center of Piedmont is about 22 miles (35 km) northwest of the center of Oklahoma City.

According to the United States Census Bureau, Piedmont has a total area of 44.1 square miles (114.1 km^{2}), of which 43.6 square miles (112.9 km^{2}) is land and 0.46 square miles (1.2 km^{2}), or 1.02%, is water.

== Demographics ==
Historical population
Census	Pop.	Note	%±
1910	255		—
1920	213		−16.5%
1930	148		−30.5%
1940	151		2.0%
1950	120		−20.5%
1960	146		21.7%
1970	269		84.2%
1980	2,016		649.4%
1990	2,522		25.1%
2000	3,650		44.7%
2010	5,720		56.7%
2020	7,402		29.4%
U.S. Decennial Census

Piedmont also has many plains and has many crops growing, meaning many farmers.

=== 2020 census ===
As of the 2020 census, Piedmont had a population of 7,402. The median age was 37.5 years. 30.9% of residents were under the age of 18 and 11.6% of residents were 65 years of age or older. For every 100 females there were 98.8 males, and for every 100 females age 18 and over there were 95.8 males age 18 and over.

0% of residents lived in urban areas, while 100.0% lived in rural areas.

There were 2,488 households in Piedmont, of which 47.8% had children under the age of 18 living in them. Of all households, 74.2% were married-couple households, 9.2% were households with a male householder and no spouse or partner present, and 13.2% were households with a female householder and no spouse or partner present. About 12.1% of all households were made up of individuals and 5.7% had someone living alone who was 65 years of age or older.

There were 2,583 housing units, of which 3.7% were vacant. Among occupied housing units, 91.3% were owner-occupied and 8.7% were renter-occupied. The homeowner vacancy rate was 1.7% and the rental vacancy rate was 8.1%.

Racial composition as of the 2020 census
Race	Percent
White	81.2%
Black or African American	0.6%
American Indian and Alaska Native	3.5%
Asian	0.9%
Native Hawaiian and Other Pacific Islander	<0.1%
Some other race	1.8%
Two or more races	12.0%
Hispanic or Latino (of any race)	7.3%

=== 2010 census ===
As of the census of 2010, there were 5,720 people in 1,836 households in the city. The population density was 83.3 inhabitants per square mile (32.2/km^{2}). There were 1,270 housing units at an average density of 29.0 per square mile (11.2/km^{2}). The 2010 racial makeup of the city was 87.7% white, 1% African American, 3.4% Native American, 0.07% Asian, and 3.7% from two or more races. Persons of Hispanic or Latino origin were 4.8% of the population.

In the city, the population was spread out, with 31.3% under the age of 18, 6.4% from 18 to 24, 32.5% from 25 to 44, 23.2% from 45 to 64, and 6.4% who were 65 years of age or older. The median age was 35 years. For every 100 females, there were 99.6 males. For every 100 females age 18 and over, there were 97.3 males.

The median income for a household in the city was $85,313 from 2006 to 2010 and the median income for a family was $57,121. Males had a median income of $37,273 versus $26,332 for females. The per capita income for the city was $33,694. About 4.0% of families and 4.4% of the population were below the poverty line, including 4.6% of those under age 18 and 1.4% of those age 65 or over.

=== 2000 census ===
Census 2000 numbers list 1,226 households, out of which 49.3% had children under the age of 18 living with them, 78.4% were married couples living together, 7.2% had a female householder with no husband present, and 11.6% were non-families. 9.9% of all households were made up of individuals, and 2.8% had someone living alone who was 65 years of age or older. The average household size was 2.98 and the average family size was 3.18.

== Education ==
The Piedmont school district reports an enrollment of 4,823 students for the 2021–2022 school year. Piedmont's school district consists of 7 school facilities: Early Childhood Center, 3 Elementary Schools, Intermediate School, Middle School, and High School. School teams are known by the nickname "Wildcats."

== Government ==
Piedmont is a home rule city served by a council–manager government.

Jason Orr was the City Manager from July 2016 until August 2021 when he was fired by the City Council as the result of an investigation by the Oklahoma State Auditor and Inspector. The report revealed that Orr had violated Piedmont ordinances with the purchase of two pickup trucks by not obtaining prior Council approval and soliciting competitive bids as required. The report also revealed that Orr had contacted City Council members via phone calls prior to the purchase in February 2020 which appeared "to be an action of the Council conducted outside of an official meeting, a circumvention of the Open Meetings Act". No action was ever taken against the Council members for their actions.

Josh Williams has been the City Manager since June 2022. Kurt Mayabb is currently the Mayor and his term will expire in 2027.

== Media ==
Piedmont and nearby communities are served by the Piedmont-Surrey Hills Gazette.
