= Mason, Oklahoma =

Mason
- Unincorporated community
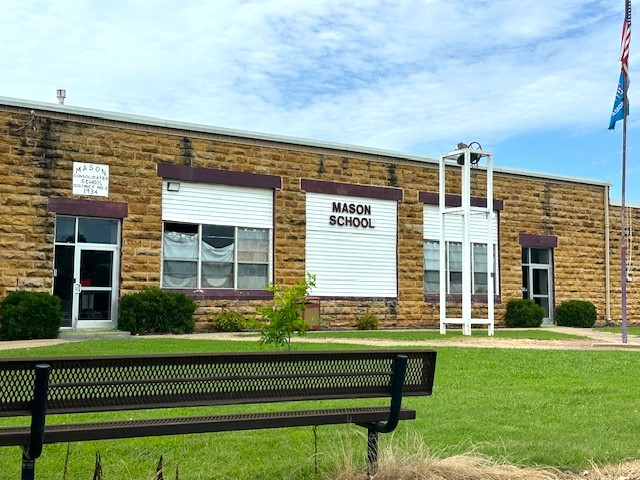
- Mason School in July 2025

- Location within the state of Oklahoma Mason (the United States)
- Coordinates: 35°33′58″N 96°21′08″W
- Country: United States
- State: Oklahoma
- County: Okfuskee
- Elevation: 755 ft (230 m)
- Time zone: UTC-6 (Central (CST))
  - Summer (DST): UTC-5 (CDT)
- GNIS feature ID: 1095168

Mason is a small unincorporated rural community in Okfuskee County, Oklahoma, United States. The post office was established October 17, 1910. It was named for the first postmaster, Daniel S. Mason.
