= St. Louis, El Reno and Western Railway =

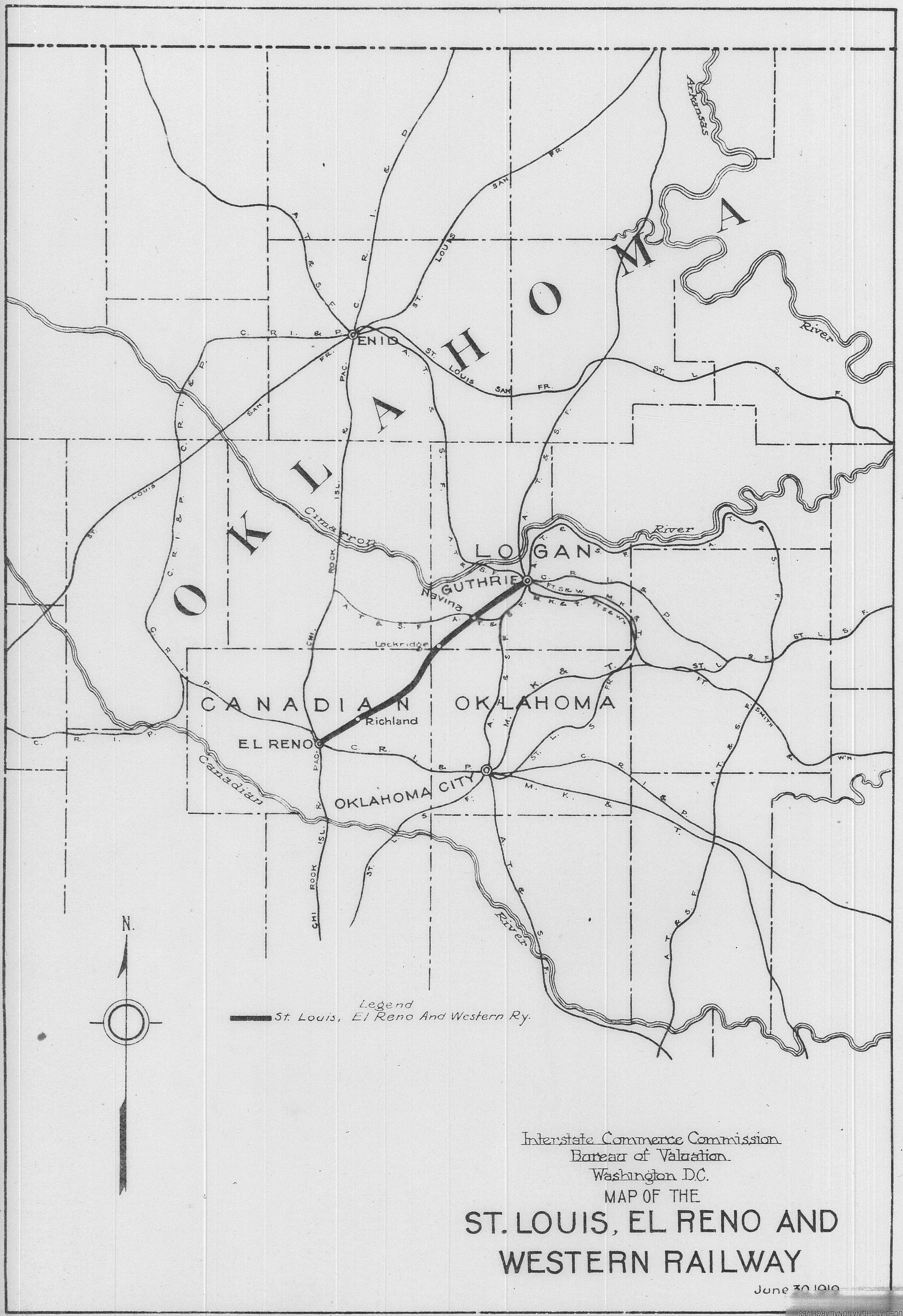
1919 map of the railroad

The St. Louis, El Reno and Western Railway was a small struggling railroad, started by local business interests in the Territorial Capital of Guthrie, Oklahoma. The railroad was built to move freight and passengers from eastern connections at Guthrie, West to the huge Rock Island Railroad hub and system cross roads at El Reno, Oklahoma. Working through the oil boom of the early-20th century with service to the South end of the large "Cashion Pool" and the boom towns of Piedmont, Richland and Navina.

== History ==
The company was incorporated on January 5, 1903. The line was merged into the Fort Smith and Western Railroad just a few years after it opened.

History played a cruel trick on those who bet their fortunes on the Old West boomtown of Guthrie. A few years after statehood, the state capitol was moved from Guthrie to Oklahoma City, which led to a significant economic downturn in Guthrie, and all of the projected new railroads now building toward Oklahoma City and not Guthrie.

By the last days of the railroad following a flood in 1920, its bridge over the Canadian River had only 2 to 3 pilings per bent, instead of the required 8; the State Railroad Inspectors were aghast and quickly condemned the bridge. Without access to its station in El Reno, service sputtered on intermittently until ending in 1923. Trains ran on the line again briefly in 1925, but only for a short time.

== End of the line ==
By late 1925, the railroad ceased operations for good, according to records at the Canadian County Historical society in El Reno.

There are however a few post death stories of interest. It seems that the railroad was not taken up immediately. Little maintenance push cars were left by the side, and the young men of the area soon found them. They would push the cars up the long grade to the Town Cemetery and then jump aboard for a wild ride back into town. Railroad inspectors were called out when it was learned that the railroad was moving carloads of wheat and farm products long after it was abandoned. When they arrived at the lines El Reno, depot, there was one old 4-4-0 locomotive missing the cab, and the railroad was reportedly scrapped in 1927.
