= Thlopthlocco Tribal Town =

Federally recognized Native American tribe in Oklahoma

Rvprakko (Creek)
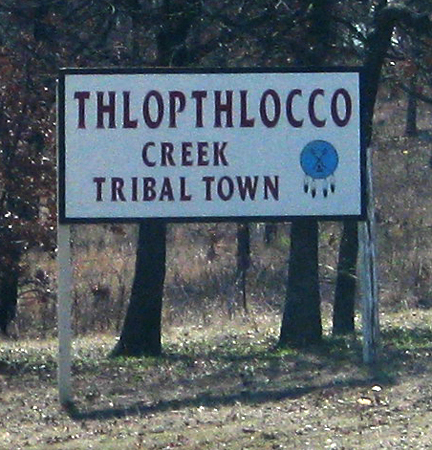
- Sign to tribal town

Total population
- 845 (2011)

Regions with significant populations
- Oklahoma, United States

Languages
- English, Mvskoke

Religion
- Protestantism, Indigenous religion

Related ethnic groups
- other Alabama and Coushatta, other Muskogean peoples (Miccosukee, Chickasaw, Choctaw, Muscogee, and Seminole)

Thlopthlocco Tribal Town (Creek: Rvprakko IPA: [ɬaːpɬákko]) is both a federally recognized Native American tribe and a tribal town of Muscogee Indians, based in Oklahoma. The tribe's language is Mvskoke.

== Name ==
Rvprakko is a Mvskoke term meaning "Big Cane" or "Big Reed". The sound of the “r" in the Muscogee alphabet is pronounced as /ɬ/, a voiceless lateral fricative. This sound has been described as “placing the tongue halfway between the ‘th’ position and the ‘l’ position" and is written as "thl" in the English placename.

== History ==
The Muscogee Creek Confederacy was composed of autonomous tribal towns, governed by their own elected leadership. The Muscogee originated in the Southeastern United States, in what is now Alabama and Georgia. They were collectively removed from the southeast to Indian Territory under the United States' Indian Removal Policy of the 1830s.

Before 1832, the Thlopthlocco Tribal Town split from a larger town. It was removed to Indian Territory in 1835. The citizens of the town settled in an area south of Okemah, Oklahoma, in what would become Okfuskee County, on lands that were originally occupied by the Osage and Quapaw. Those tribes ceded their lands to the US by 1825.

During the American Civil War, Thlopthlocco Tribal Town was briefly the headquarters of Confederate Col. Douglas H. Cooper. Greenleaf Town, located five miles northwest of Thlopthlocco, was the headquarters of Opothleyahola, a Muscogee leader who worked to resolve conflicts between the Muscogee factions during the war. He and 5,000 others moved north to Kansas to avoid the Civil War. After the war, the Muscogee collectively signed the 1866 Treaty with the United States and freed their slaves. The treaty also called for the Muscogee Freedmen to have citizenship in the Muscogee Nation. The freedmen settled new townships in Okfuskee County, including Boley, Bookertee, Clearview, Chilesville, and Rusk.

Thlopthlocco Tribal Town retained its tribal identity despite allotments of land to individual households under the Dawes Commission of 1896. From 1898 to 1906, citizens among the Five Civilized Tribes were registered on what have come to be known as the Dawes Rolls. After making allotments to households registered with the tribes, the US government declared other formerly tribal land as surplus and sold it to European-American settlers after 1906. This further broke up tribal communal territory.

The Thlopthlocco Tribal citizens organized as a distinct tribe under the Oklahoma Indian Welfare Act of 1936, which followed the national Indian Reorganization Act of 1934. The original headquarters for the tribe was the Thlopthlocco Methodist Episcopal Church, located between Wetumka and Okemah.

In August 2012, National Indian Gaming Commission gave a notice to Thlopthlocco Tribal Town for their violation of Indian Gaming Regulatory Act by allowing two casinos without a management contract.

In August 2014, Thlopthlocco Tribal Town received a $500,000 grant from the U.S. Department of Agriculture as part of their partnership with Euchee Butterfly Farm to expand butterfly farming.

== Government ==
Thlopthlocco Tribal Town is headquartered in Okemah, Oklahoma. Tribal enrollment is 845, with 728 citizens living within the state of Oklahoma, and is based on lineal descent. The governing body of the town, known as the Business Committee, consists of five elected officials and five citizens of the town appointed by elected officials. Brent Smith is the elected Mekko, or Town King. He succeeded Brent Brown.

As of 2026, the current administration is:

- Town King (Mekko): Brent Smith
- Warrior: Timmy Cheek
- Secretary: Tara Been
- Treasurer: Leyahna Hicks
- Warrior: Cole Trickey
- Advisor: David Haney
- Advisor: Timothy Wolf
- Advisor: McCoy Joslin
- Advisor: Tawnya Boyles
- Advisor: Bryan McGertt

The tribal jurisdictional area of Thlopthlocco is within Creek, Hughes, Mayes, McIntosh, Muskogee, Okfuskee, Okmulgee, Rogers, Seminole, Tulsa, and Wagoner Counties. The tribe maintains a close relationship with the Muscogee (Creek) Nation and falls under the jurisdiction of their tribal courts.

=== Citizenship ===
Citizens of the Thlopthlocco Tribal Town must be of matrilineal descent from a base enrollee of either the 1890 Creek Census Roll or the 1895 Creek Payroll. If an individual's mother is not of Muscogee descent, their father must be a citizen of the Town.

== Economic development ==
Thlopthlocco operates its own tribal housing program, smoke shop, and the Golden Pony Casino, located in Okemah. The tribe's economic impact for 2011 was $12,500,000.

In August 2012, the National Indian Gaming Commission notified the Thlopthlocco Tribal Town that it was in violation of the Indian Gaming Regulatory Act for allowing two Atlanta, Georgia companies to operate the Golden Pony Casino for several years without a contract. The companies named were Titan Network LLC and Mercury Gaming Group LLC. The violations occurred from September 2005 through December 2010.
