= Ed Baecht =

American baseball player (1907–1957)

- Pitcher
- Born: May 15, 1907; Paden, Oklahoma, U.S.
- Died: August 15, 1957 (aged 50); Grafton, Illinois, U.S.
- Batted: Right Threw: Right

MLB debut
- April 24, 1926, for the Philadelphia Phillies

Last MLB appearance
- September 3, 1937, for the St. Louis Browns

MLB statistics
- Win–loss record: 5–6
- Earned run average: 5.56
- Strikeouts: 61
- Stats at Baseball Reference

Teams
- Philadelphia Phillies (1926–1928); Chicago Cubs (1931–1932); St. Louis Browns (1937)

Edward Joseph Baecht (May 15, 1907 – August 15, 1957) was a right-handed relief pitcher in Major League Baseball for the Philadelphia Phillies, Chicago Cubs, and St. Louis Browns.

== Biography ==
Baecht was born in Paden, Oklahoma. Baecht made his Major League debut on April 24, 1926. He was the third-youngest man to appear in a Major League game that season, trailing only Rufus Meadows and Mel Ott.

Baecht posted a 2–0 record and completed his only start in his rookie season, but made his mark primarily as a reliever, a role he fulfilled in 27 games. Despite an ERA of 6.11, Baecht was given a chance as a starter again in 1927. After allowing six runs in just eight innings of work and taking the loss, Baecht was returned to the minor leagues. He returned in 1928, pitching in nine games, again with a single starting appearance. His ERA remained high at 6.00, and Baecht was again returned to the minors for further seasoning.

He would not return to the majors until 1931, this time as a member of the Chicago Cubs. There, he enjoyed his finest professional season, sporting a career-low ERA of 3.76 in 22 games, including a career-high six starts and two complete games. This did not translate to a lasting job in the majors, as Baecht made just one relief appearance in 1932, firing a scoreless inning.

After another extended absence from the major leagues, Baecht reemerged in 1937 at age 30 with the St. Louis Browns after signing as a free agent on August 11. He appeared in just three games, allowing fifteen runs (nine earned) on thirteen hits, including three home runs. His ERA of 12.79 in 6 1/3 innings was a career worst. His September 3, 1937 appearance proved to be his last at baseball's highest level.

== Death ==
Baecht died on August 15, 1957, in Grafton, Illinois, and is interred in Oak Grove Cemetery in Jerseyville, Illinois.
