= Shawna Russell =

American singer-songwriter (born 1978)

Shawna Gayle Russell (born August 14, 1978) is an American country music singer, songwriter and musician from Okemah, Oklahoma. Russell’s musical style combines country, rock and Americana influences. To date, Russell has released three albums.

== Early life ==
Russell was born to Keith and Teresa Russell in Holdenville, Oklahoma. Russell married Brandon Burnett on Oct. 5, 1998.

== Musical career ==
Russell first sang in public at age seven. When she was thirteen, she and her father Keith Russell formed a country band that played clubs and Elks Club lodges on weekends. At age 17, she joined her uncle Tim Russell's band and toured the club circuit across the Southwestern United States. Russell honed her vocals and developed her talent on acoustic rhythm, electric slide and lead guitar. The band toured clubs and other venues across the country, including the Grizzly Rose in Denver, Billy Bob's Texas in Fort Worth, and the Wildhorse Saloon in Nashville. Russell then spent three years doing vocals and playing guitar in Ty England’s band, including a 2005 USO Tour of South Korea. In 2007, Russell started her solo career.

Russell released her debut album, Goddess, on March 4, 2008. Recorded in Oklahoma City and produced by Tim Russell and Ted Curtis, the album featured drummer Russ Kunkel and bassist David Santos. The recording engineer was Julian King. Goddess was mixed by Grammy-winner Nathaniel Kunkel. Russell co-wrote 12 of the 13 songs on the album. Goddess received positive reviews from Country Weekly The Oklahoman, and a CMA Close Up magazine “New Artist Spotlight” feature where her voice was compared to Martina McBride, Stevie Nicks and Bonnie Raitt. The album produced three singles; “Goddess,” “Should’ve Been Born With Wheels” and “Fire In The Desert.”

Russell’s second album, Shawna Russell was released on June 7, 2011. Recorded in Nashville, the album reunited Russell with King (this time as producer) and with Clif Doyal and Tim Russell as co-producers. Russell wrote or co-wrote the 10 songs on the album, which included remixes of three songs from Goddess. Working with Russell on Shawna Russell were guitarists Bryan Sutton and Jon Conley, keyboardists Charles Judge and Jim “Moose” Brown, drummers Shannon Forrest and Billy Thomas and bassist Mike Brignardello.

More country-leaning in its sound than Goddess, Shawna Russell received good reviews from Roughstock, Music News Nashville, the Oklahoma Gazette, Billboard, and others. The album produced two U.S. singles, “Get Right Or Get Left” and “Waitin’ On Sunrise,” the latter charting in the Top 30 on the national MusicRow CountryBreakout Chart in May 2012. It also produce two European singles, “Sounds Like A Party” and “Everybody’s Got A Story (Remix).” The 11th Annual Independent Music Awards nominated Shawna Russell for best "Country Album" in 2012. Russell released two music videos that received playtime at CMT, GAC, The Country Network, and other video outlets.

In 2016, Russell became the host of The Country Network (TCN) show "Our Land The Music Highway". The show features Americana, Texas and Red Dirt music artists, interviews and music from Russell and her band.

In June 2017, Russell released Back Around on the Our Land label she created with Tim Russell and Jerry Putnam. The EP was recorded with Russell's touring band, the Ranch Hands, at Tim's "Runnin R Ranch" studios.
