= Fort Smith and Western Railway =

Railway line in Arkansas and Oklahoma, USA

Overview
- Headquarters: Fort Smith, Arkansas
- Reporting mark: FSW
- Locale: Arkansas, Oklahoma
- Dates of operation: 1899–1939

Technical
- Track gauge: 4 ft 8 1/2 in (1,435 mm) standard gauge

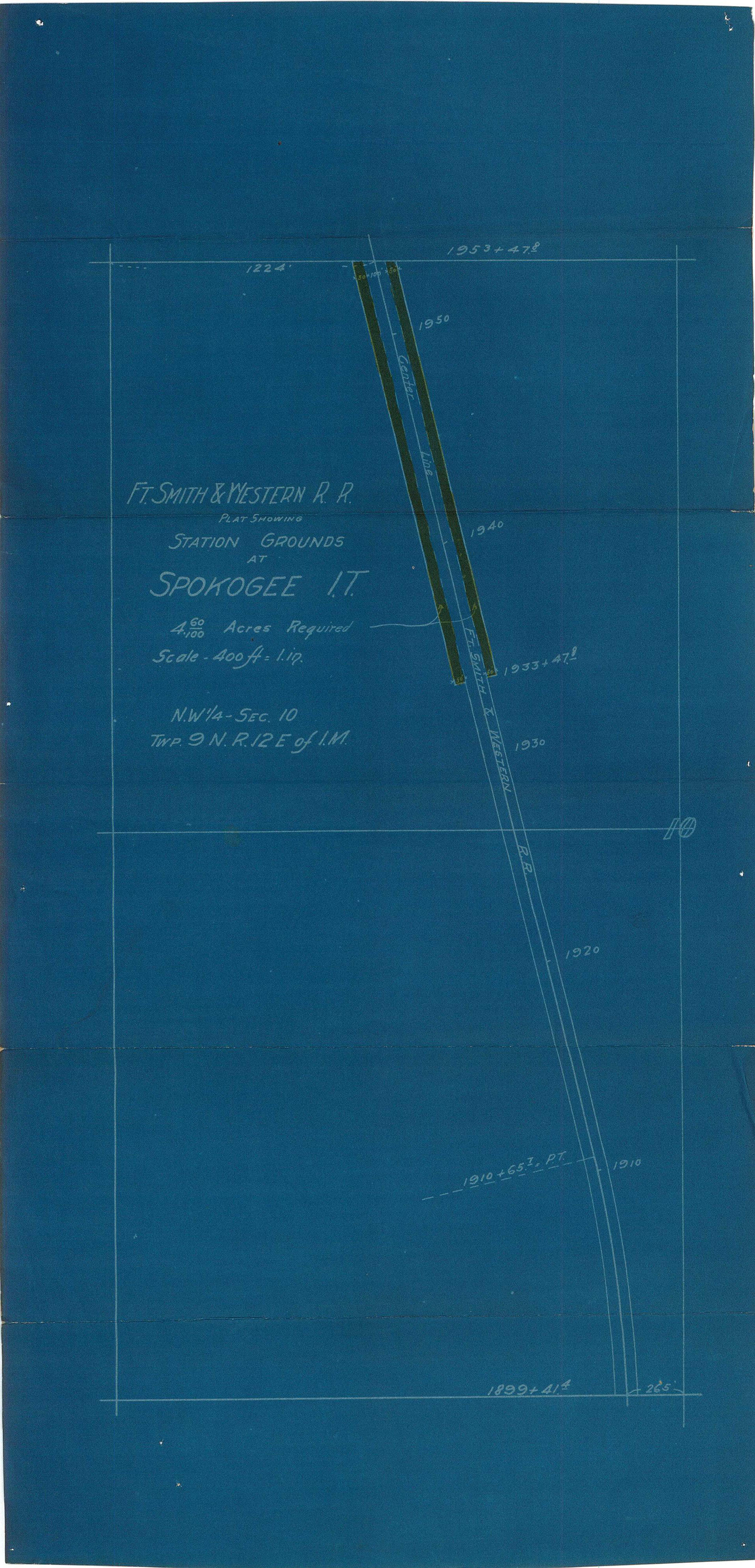
Fort Smith and Western Railway plat showing station grounds at Spokogee, Indian Territory

The Fort Smith and Western Railway (reporting mark FSW) was a railroad that operated in the states of Arkansas and Oklahoma.

The railroad's main line extended 197 miles (317 km) from Coal Creek, Oklahoma (about 7 miles east of Bokoshe, Oklahoma) to Guthrie, Oklahoma, with an additional 20 miles (32 km) of trackage rights over the Kansas City Southern Railway (KCS) between Fort Smith, Arkansas and Coal Creek. Guthrie was the territorial capital of Oklahoma, and a junction point with the Santa Fe Railway. The Fort Smith and Western owned a subsidiary, St. Louis, El Reno and Western Railway, which began operating 42 miles (68 km) between Guthrie and El Reno, Oklahoma in June 1904.

== History ==
The Fort Smith and Western Railroad was incorporated in Arkansas in 1899 and began construction westward through Indian Territory and Oklahoma Territory. On November 1, 1903, the railroad was opened between Fort Smith and Guthrie. The capital of Oklahoma was moved from Guthrie to Oklahoma City in 1910, and in 1915, the FS&W acquired 32.5 miles (52.3 km) of trackage rights over the Missouri-Kansas-Texas Railroad from Fallis, Oklahoma to Oklahoma City.

The U.S. District Court in Fort Smith placed the Fort Smith and Western Railroad in receivership on October 9, 1915, on petition by the Superior Savings & Trust Company of Cleveland, Ohio. The company emerged from receivership as the Fort Smith and Western Railway on February 1, 1923, only to re-enter receivership on June 1, 1931. The Missouri-Kansas-Texas Railroad withdrew trackage rights between Fallis and Oklahoma City in January 1939 after the FS&W defaulted on rental fees, and the FS&W ceased operations on February 9, 1939.

The route of the FS&W served no major population centers, but did serve major coal mining operations in eastern Oklahoma at (from east to west) Coal Creek, Bokoshe, and McCurtain. Continuing west, other towns served included Crowder, Hanna, Weleetka, Okemah, Boley, Paden, Prague, and Meridian before reaching Guthrie. A major portion of the road's freight traffic was metallurgical-grade coal from San Bois Coal Company mines near McCurtain. As coal traffic declined, an oil discovery near Okemah brought additional traffic, which postponed the abandonment of the railroad.

=== The Fort Smith and Van Buren Railway ===
The trackage of the Fort Smith and Western Railway was acquired in foreclosure by Schiavone-Bonomo Corp. for scrapping purposes on July 1, 1939; however, a portion was then resold to the Fort Smith and Van Buren Railway (FS&VB) on September 16, 1939. The segment acquired was the original 20.92 miles of track between Coal Creek and Mile Post 41, a spot near McCurtain. The FS&VB was a subsidiary of the KCS, but was initially operated separately. The remaining non-acquired trackage, from Mile Post 41 to Guthrie, was dismantled during 1939 and the early part of 1940.

The FS&VB was merged into KCS on July 6, 1992. By that time the FS&VB no longer had personnel of its own. On September 26, 1994, the KCS filed an abandonment exemption with the Interstate Commerce Commission on all the remaining trackage, indicating no local traffic had operated over the line in at least 2 years.
