= Boley Historic District =

Historic district in Oklahoma, United States

- U.S. National Register of Historic Places
- U.S. National Historic Landmark District
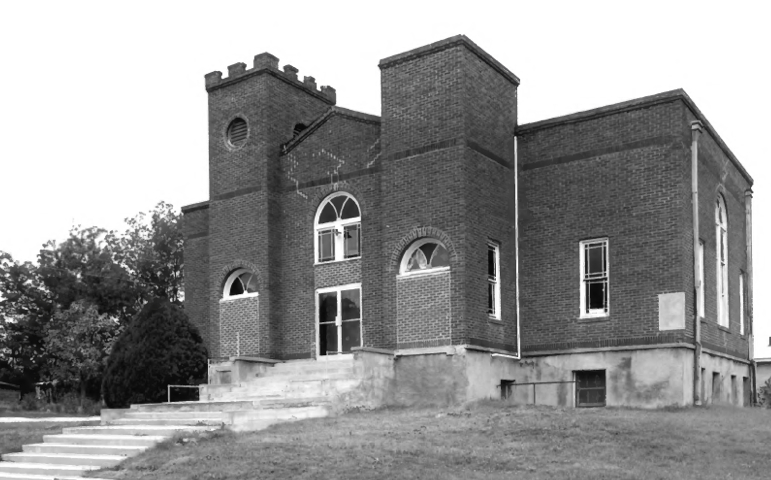
- Antioch Baptist Church, Boley NHLD

- Location within Oklahoma Location within the United States
- Location: Boley, Oklahoma
- Coordinates: 35°29′44″N 96°28′58″W
- Built: 1903
- NRHP reference No.: 75001568

Significant dates
- Added to NRHP: May 15, 1975
- Designated NHLD: May 15, 1975

The Boley Historic District (BHD), in Boley, Oklahoma is the original business area of an all-black town founded in 1903. The town of Boley prospered from the time of its incorporation until the onset of the Great Depression. According to the Encyclopedia of Oklahoma History and Culture, Boley became the largest and best-known of all the All-Black Towns. African-Americans migrated from other states to escape the Jim Crow Laws that promoted discrimination against them. However, falling farm prices starting in the late 1920s, caused many agricultural workers to move elsewhere in the county, and Boley began to decline.

BHD was declared a National Historic Landmark in 1975.

It is roughly bounded by Seward Avenue, Walnut and Cedar Streets, and the southern city limits of Boley. The site of the historic district covers 34.5 acres (14.0 ha). The district includes 14 buildings or other structures, all built between 1903 and 1921, which are considered supporting structures.

Contributing Resources for Boley Historic District
Name	Year built	Comments
Antioch Baptist Church	1905	Reconstructed on same site in 1929. See picture above.
Oliver Building	1910	Originally a grocery and feed store. Now serves as Masonic Lodge
Watson Building	1915 (lower part); 1920 (upper part)	Lower part was a grocery store. Upper part was a hotel. Now the whole building is the American Legion Hotel.
Cozine Building	1910	Originally a grocery, but later became a pool hall.
T. L. Wood Building		Originally a dry goods store. Converted into Boley City Hall.
Masonic Hall	1915	Originally a 3-story building, but later the top 2 floors were removed. Has since become the Boley Post Office.
Farmers and Merchants Bank Building	1920	Operated as Farmers and Merchants Bank. After a 1932 robbery by the Pretty Boy Floyd gang, it reorganized as Farmers State Bank, operating in same building until 1962. Then became a warehouse.
Turner's Pharmacy Building	1910	Opened as a pharmacy. Was vacant at the time of NRHP application.
T. M. Haynes Building	1909	Originally a mercantile establishment on the first floor; second floor contained both a telephone office and a rooming house. Subsequently, the building was occupied by the M. W. Lee Manufacturing Company.
Boley Bank and Trust Building	1906-1907	Two-story building originally housed a bank, which was replaced by a cafe on the lower floor and living quarters on the upper floor.
Frame Church Building	1904	Originally the first church and school in Boley, shared by Baptist and Methodist congregations. Later housed the Christian Church at the time of NRHP application.
Tieul Clothing Store Building	1921	Building has remained a clothing store until time of NRHP application.
Utility Plant Site		Originally, a building housed a coal-fired steam generator that provided electricity for lighting in the town. The destroyed building also housed the jail and a garage for the town fire truck.
Water Tower	1921	Elevated 80 feet (24 m) standard silver-painted steel tower on four legs was still standing, but no longer in service at the time of NRHP application.

More recent construction in Boley has had little or no effect on the historic character of the BHD. According to the NRHP application, "It is still considered by many of the town's senior residents to be as much the same as before."

A group of photographic images attached to the NRHP inventory document have been published on the web. These were taken in 1974, and show that time has not been kind to the buildings and structures that still remain. Many appear to be abandoned or neglected and in various stages of decay.

== See also ==
- List of National Historic Landmarks in Oklahoma
- National Register of Historic Places listings in Okfuskee County, Oklahoma
