= Okemah Lake =

- Location within Oklahoma
- Country: United States
- Location: Okemah, Oklahoma
- Coordinates: 35.524550°N 96.319866°W
- Status: complete
- Owner: City of Okemah

Reservoir
- Maximum water depth: 17 feet (5.2 m)

Okemah Lake is a reservoir in Okemah, Oklahoma. The lake is located to the north of the town, east of IXL.

== Recreation ==
The lake is a popular fishing, boating and camping location. There are a number of boat ramps, a public park and an RV campsite located at the lake.
