= Paden, Oklahoma =

- Town
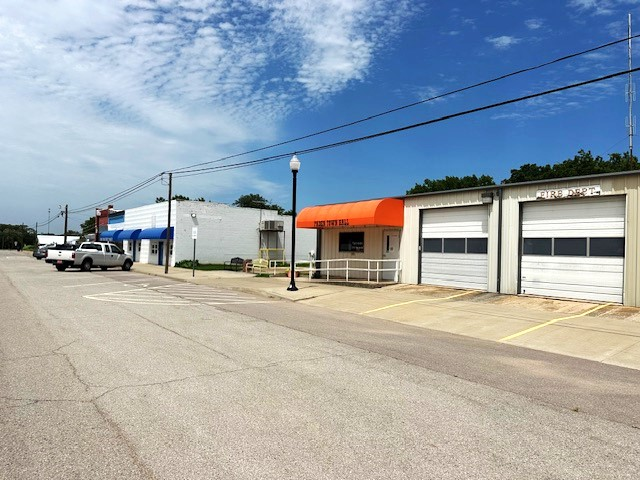
- Paden Fire Dept and City Hall in Downtown

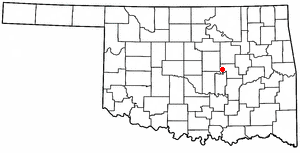
- Location of Paden, Oklahoma
- Coordinates: 35°30′29″N 96°34′03″W
- Country: United States
- State: Oklahoma
- County: Okfuskee

Government
  - Type: City Council
  - Mayor: Chance Dean

Area
  - Total: 0.45 sq mi (1.16 km^{2})
  - Land: 0.44 sq mi (1.14 km^{2})
  - Water: 0.0077 sq mi (0.02 km^{2})
- Elevation: 1,001 ft (305 m)

Population (2020)
  - Total: 419
  - Density: 950/sq mi (367/km^{2})
- Time zone: UTC-6 (Central (CST))
  - Summer (DST): UTC-5 (CDT)
- ZIP code: 74860
- Area code: 405
- FIPS code: 40-56800
- GNIS feature ID: 2413097

Paden is a town in Okfuskee County, Oklahoma, United States. The population was 419 at the 2020 Census. It is named for Paden Tolbert, a U.S. Deputy Marshal who served the area in the early 1900s.

== Geography ==
According to the United States Census Bureau, the town has a total area of 0.5 square miles (1.3 km^{2}), all land.

The ghost town of Micawber, Oklahoma, which disappeared in the 1930s (only the Micawber Cemetery remains), is north-northeast of Paden and in Paden’s zip code.

== Demographics ==
Historical population
Census	Pop.	Note	%±
1910	419		—
1920	600		43.2%
1930	595		−0.8%
1940	620		4.2%
1950	426		−31.3%
1960	417		−2.1%
1970	442		6.0%
1980	448		1.4%
1990	400		−10.7%
2000	446		11.5%
2010	461		3.4%
2020	419		−9.1%
U.S. Decennial Census

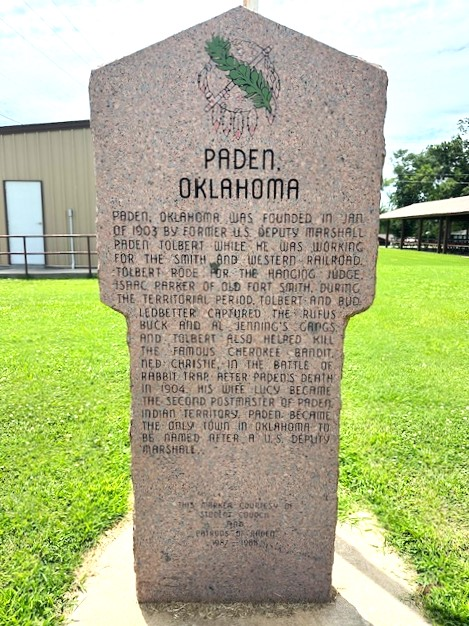
Paden Historical Marker in July of 2025

=== 2020 census ===
As of the 2020 census, Paden had a population of 419. The median age was 44.2 years. 23.6% of residents were under the age of 18 and 21.2% of residents were 65 years of age or older. For every 100 females there were 92.2 males, and for every 100 females age 18 and over there were 81.8 males age 18 and over.

0.0% of residents lived in urban areas, while 100.0% lived in rural areas.

There were 191 households in Paden, of which 31.4% had children under the age of 18 living in them. Of all households, 39.8% were married-couple households, 19.4% were households with a male householder and no spouse or partner present, and 33.0% were households with a female householder and no spouse or partner present. About 35.1% of all households were made up of individuals and 14.7% had someone living alone who was 65 years of age or older.

There were 224 housing units, of which 14.7% were vacant. The homeowner vacancy rate was 0.7% and the rental vacancy rate was 16.4%.

Racial composition as of the 2020 census
Race	Number	Percent
White	257	61.3%
Black or African American	18	4.3%
American Indian and Alaska Native	79	18.9%
Asian	0	0.0%
Native Hawaiian and Other Pacific Islander	0	0.0%
Some other race	6	1.4%
Two or more races	59	14.1%
Hispanic or Latino (of any race)	20	4.8%

=== 2010 census ===
As of the census of 2010, there were 461 people, 199 households, and 134 families residing in the town. The population density was 973.8 inhabitants per square mile (376.0/km^{2}). There were 234 housing units at an average density of 510.9 per square mile (197.3/km^{2}). The racial makeup of the town was 54.68% White, 37.70% Native American, and 7.62% from two or more races. Hispanic or Latino of any race were 0.90% of the population.

There were 199 households, out of which 27.6% had children under the age of 18 living with them, 45.7% were married couples living together, 16.6% had a female householder with no husband present, and 32.7% were non-families. 30.2% of all households were made up of individuals, and 14.6% had someone living alone who was 65 years of age or older. The average household size was 2.32 and the average family size was 2.81.

In the town, the population was spread out, with 25.0% under the age of 18, 8.5% from 18 to 24, 28.5% from 25 to 44, 19.7% from 45 to 64, and 15.7% who were 65 years of age or older. The median age was 35 years. For every 100 females, there were 89.0 males. For every 100 females age 18 and over, there were 85.6 males.

The median income for a household in the town was $27,321, and the median income for a family was $31,250. Males had a median income of $24,444 versus $20,972 for females. The per capita income for the town was $12,444. About 7.1% of families and 9.0% of the population were below the poverty line, including 10.2% of those under age 18 and 12.7% of those age 65 or over.

== Notable people ==
- Ed Baecht — former major league baseball player, born in Paden
- Dan Boren — former U.S. Congressman
