= Treece =

Treece may refer to:

- Treece, Kansas, a small town in the United States
- Chuck Treece, session musician and professional skateboarder
- Henry Treece, poet and writer (now known mainly for his historical novels)

== See also ==
- Trece (disambiguation)
