= 2008 Picher–Neosho tornado =

2008 EF4 tornado in the United States

- Top image: A photograph of the tornado in its "stovepipe" phase; Middle images: The associated reflectivity and velocity signatures of the tornado as it entered Picher; Bottom image: An aerial view of Picher, following the tornado

Meteorological history
- Formed: May 10, 2008, 5:20 p.m. CDT (UTC−05:00)
- Dissipated: May 10, 2008, 6:55 p.m. CDT (UTC−05:00)
- Duration: 1 hour, 35 minutes

EF4 tornado
- on the Enhanced Fujita scale
- Max width: 1,760 yards (1.00 mi; 1.61 km)
- Path length: 75.51 miles (121.52 km)
- Highest winds: 165–175 mph (266–282 km/h)

Overall effects
- Fatalities: 21
- Injuries: 350
- Damage: $60.6 million (2008 USD)
- Areas affected: Craig and Ottawa counties in Oklahoma; Newton and Barry counties in Missouri
- Part of the Tornado outbreak sequence of May 7–11, 2008 and Tornadoes of 2008

In the afternoon and early evening hours of May 10, 2008, a large and violent tornado moved through northeastern Oklahoma and southwestern Missouri, striking the communities of Picher, Racine and Granby. The tornado killed 21 people and injured over 300 more. It was rated EF4 on the Enhanced Fujita scale and was the second-deadliest tornado of 2008.

The tornado first touched down in Oklahoma southwest of Chetopa, Kansas, before rapidly intensifying and hitting Picher at EF4 intensity. It caused extensive damage in Picher, where it killed six people and destroyed over 200 homes. Due in part to the tornado damage, Picher later disincorporated. The tornado then passed to the north of Quapaw and crossed into Missouri, causing damage in Racine and killing several people. It passed north of Neosho and caused additional damage near Granby before lifting east of Purdy.

== Meteorological synopsis ==
While weak tornadoes touched down north of Xenia, Ohio, during the early evening hours of May 9, the second outbreak of the day produced several strong tornadoes across the western Carolinas and southwestern Virginia. A line of showers and thunderstorms moved across the Appalachians. CAPE values were at around 1500 J/kg across parts of North Carolina. One tornado hit the Clemmons, North Carolina area producing EF3 damage to several homes. The same area was hit an F3 tornado on the same date in 1998. Just after 11:00 pm, another tornado from the same supercell struck the western Greensboro region, killing one person inside a truck overturned by the tornado. The storm also damaged several buildings including homes, businesses and warehouses. Two FedEx planes at the Piedmont Triad International Airport were pitched off the tarmac as the storm lifted near the area. Other tornadoes produced some significant damage north of the Piedmont Triad region across southern Virginia.

The following day, a new wave of tornadoes from a second system affected portions of the southern Plains and the Lower-Mississippi Valley. Temperatures across the region reached the 80s across portions of the South with mostly upper 70s elsewhere. CAPE values were between 1000 and 2000 J/kg near the center of the low with readings over 2000 J/kg across Mississippi. Helicity levels were over 250 m^{2}/s^{2}, and a moderate risk of severe storms was issued for a large portions of the Mississippi Valley as well as the Eastern Plains as a result. Tornado watches extended from eastern Oklahoma to South Carolina and north to near Kansas City. One of these watches covered the area in which the Picher tornado formed.

=== Advanced forecasting ===
On May 5, the potential for severe weather on May 10 was noted by forecasters at the Storm Prediction Center. Uncertainty was present in the Day 4-8 Convective Outlook discussion. By May 6, persistent uncertainty led forecasters to not highlight a risk for severe weather. The GFS weather model showed an amplified, and fast shortwave trough, along with other medium range weather models helped keep the forecast uncertain. On May 7, more weather models had came into agreement on an upper wave coming from the Rocky Mountains moving into the central United States on May 10. Potential for an enhanced episode of severe weather was noted by the Storm Prediction Center. A 30% risk of severe weather extended from northeastern Texas to southern Illinois and eastern Kentucky. On May 8, a slight risk of severe weather was outlined by the Storm Prediction Center. Supercells were expected to bring hail, along with the possibility of tornadoes. The greatest probability of severe weather was situated over Arkansas and western portions of Tennessee and Mississippi. On May 9, a moderate risk of severe weather was outlined on the 0800 UTC Day 2 Convective Outlook. The risk extended from Arkansas to northern Mississippi. Southern Missouri was in a slight risk, along with eastern Oklahoma. Hail, damaging winds, and isolated tornadoes were expected on May 10. By the 0600 UTC Convective Outlook, a moderate risk was maintained, although being expanded to include majority of the Deep South. A 15% risk of tornadoes was situated in the Ark-La-Tex region along with the southern Mississippi River. In that 15% risk, along with the 10% risk of tornadoes, a risk of EF2+ tornadoes was highlighted. Later in the day, on the 2000 UTC Convective Outlook, eastern Oklahoma along with southern Missouri were both moved into the 15% risk of tornadoes. A Mesoscale Discussion was issued on 10:55 on May 10, highlighting the increasing threat of severe weather.

== Tornado summary ==
The deadliest tornado of the May 7–11 outbreak sequence touched down in Craig County, Oklahoma before tracking through Ottawa County and then into Newton and Barry counties in Missouri in the late afternoon of May 10. Twenty-one people were killed in the tornado – the fatalities occurred in Picher, Oklahoma (where six people were killed), and Newton and Barry counties in Missouri (where 15 people were killed). One other person was killed in Jasper County, Missouri, from an EF1 tornado as well. Eight of the victims died inside their cars, troubling experts who say the inside of a vehicle is one of the worst places to be during a tornado.

Severe damage in a neighborhood of Picher.

The tornado first touched down near the Kansas–Oklahoma border in Craig County, Oklahoma, southwest of Chetopa, Kansas. In Craig County, the tornado destroyed numerous mobile homes. In addition, multiple trees and power lines were knocked down at EF2 intensity. The tornado reached a width of 500 yards in Craig County. The tornado entered Ottawa County along an eastward path. At around 5:40 p.m. CDT, the tornado moved through Picher. The tornado entered the town at EF4 intensity, destroying multiple manufactured homes nearby Cherokee street and 6th street. Two manufactured homes on 5th street were damaged in EF2 level wind speeds. A mix of manufactured homes and typical homes were destroyed on and nearby College Street. A line of homes on River street were destroyed at EF4 intensity. Numerous homes in the line of homes were not anchored. On Connel Avenue, homes were destroyed at EF3 intensity. Two unanchored homes damaged along Francisis street. On the very south side of Francisis street, two additional homes were destroyed at EF3 intensity. A large swath of EF0 damage existed on the tornado’s northern edge. On 7th street, a few structures were damaged at EF3 and EF4 intensity. The tornado moved southeast, traveling along 7th street. A group of homes destroyed at EF4 intensity on 8th street. A unanchored home nearby Ella street was affected at EF3 intensity. were causing catastrophic damage along a 20-block stretch of the town. In addition, numerous manufactured homes were destroyed as the tornado was exiting Picher. Six fatalities occurred in Picher, with at least 150 people were injured in town. The tornado continued eastward, impacting the northern portion of Quapaw . East of Quapaw, the tornado began weakening. At this time, the tornado’s parent storm produced a separate tornado. The separate tornado merged with the tornado that had impacted Picher. After the merging of the tornadoes, east of Interstate 44, the tornado intensified, before crossing into Newton County, Missouri.

Most of the fatalities in Missouri were reported near the Racine community at the intersection of Route 43 and Iris Road, northwest of Neosho, where automobiles were thrown as far as 1/2 mile (800 m) away. Nearly 20 people were hospitalized in Newton County.

The tornado continued eastward toward Granby. It passed very close to the intersection of US 60 and Route 59 about three miles west of Granby, destroying a church building and numerous homes/buildings as it passed through. The tornado continued southeastward and crossed Route B about 1 mile south of Granby. The area surrounding Granby's cemetery and rodeo grounds took heavy damage. The tornado continued eastward toward the village of Newtonia. There were no reported storm related deaths in the area surrounding Granby.

== Aftermath ==
Oklahoma Governor Brad Henry sent National Guard troops and emergency personnel to assist the hardest hit area in Picher, where a 20-block area suffered major damage including several destroyed structures. Damage was also reported near Peoria and Quapaw. Governor Henry and Homeland Security Secretary Michael Chertoff surveyed the area in the following days, with Chertoff stating that the damage looked "like a small nuclear bomb went off".

Prior to the tornado, the federal government had begun buying out property in the Picher area after the Environmental Protection Agency determined that the area was unsafe to inhabit due to lead toxicity and subsidence from past mining operations. Accordingly, federal and state officials confirmed that there would be no financial assistance to rebuild in Picher, although Governor Henry requested a federal disaster declaration to assist victims. As Picher's population had already been declining due to the ongoing property buyout, the tornado damage accelerated the decline and contributed to the town's eventual disincorporation. By 2015, Picher was considered a ghost town.

=== Fatalities ===
Twenty-one people were killed by the tornado, six of which occurred within Picher. Nine of the fatalities occurred within vehicles, and twelve occurred in homes. The tornado was the second-deadliest of the year; the EF3 tornado that affected areas northeast of Nashville, Tennessee, on February 5, 2008 killed twenty-two. The tornado was also the deadliest in Oklahoma since the 1999 Bridge Creek–Moore tornado, which killed thirty-six.

At the time, the tornado was the deadliest single tornado in Missouri history since a tornado hit the St. Louis Metro area on February 10, 1959, killing twenty-six. That record stood for three years until the 2011 Joplin tornado killed 158 people.

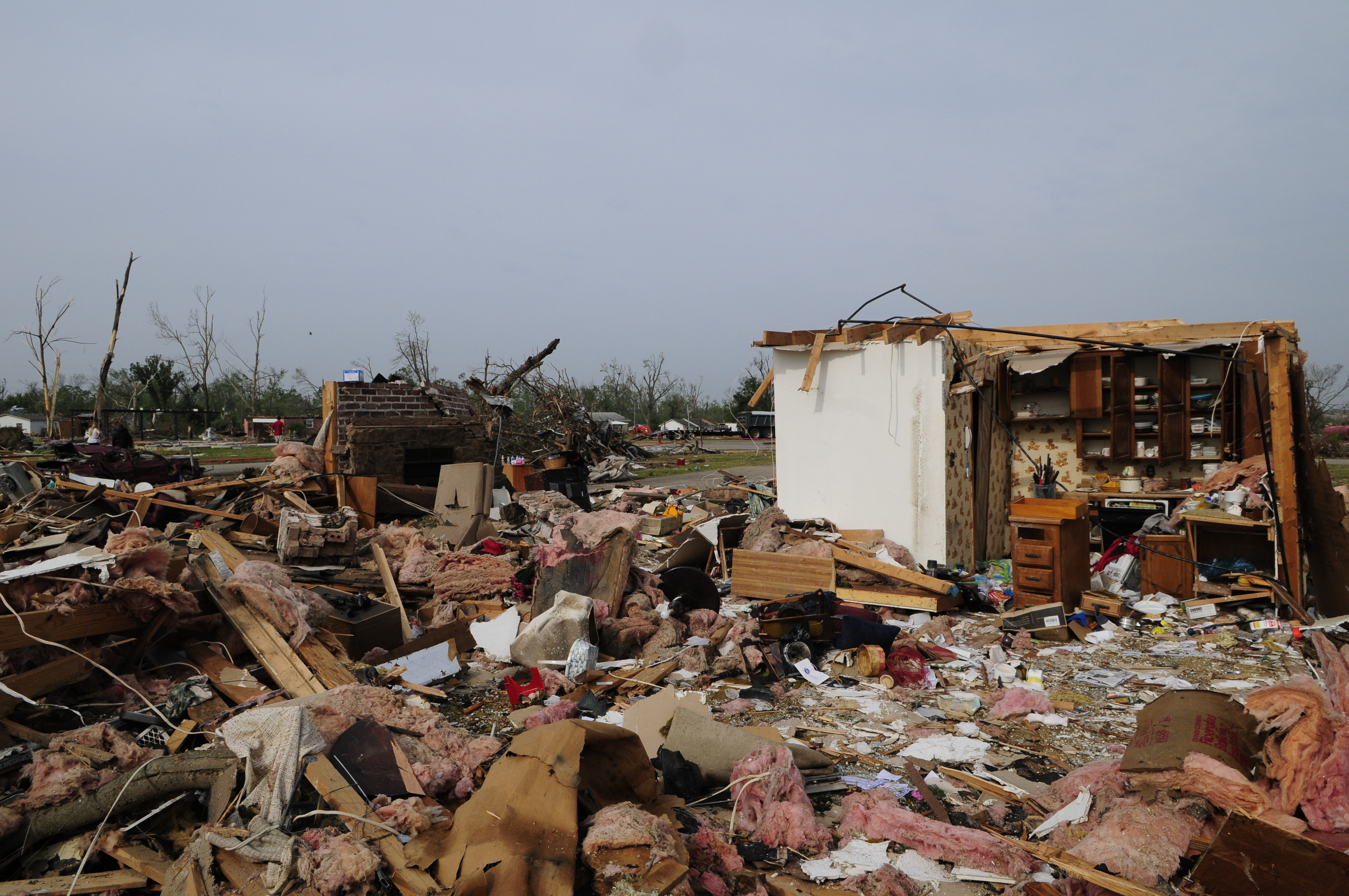
Heavy damage to a home in Picher

=== Damage survey ===
Over two hundred homes were destroyed in the Picher area. Tornado damage surveyor and forensic engineer Timothy P. Marshall conducted a ground-based damage survey in the city limits of Picher, along a 1.2-mile (1.9 km) path. The southeastern portions of Picher were particularly hard-hit; several homes that lined South Francis Street and South Emily Street were impacted and subsequently were destroyed at EF4 intensity. The tornado retained EF4 intensity over Harrell Park, and homes that lined the wooded area were destroyed. The survey also found that the damage was either little or structures were completely destroyed as a result of sharp damage gradation.

Marshall noted that the failure and collapse of exterior walls was unusually common in homes that were hit by the tornado. It was also found that termite infestations were discovered in homes that had collapsed after the tornado; it is unknown whether termites contributed to the collapses.

=== EF4 rating ===
Preliminary information from the National Weather Service office in Springfield, Missouri, suggested the Newton County tornado was a violent tornado. The preliminary rating was EF3, but it was upgraded to EF4 according to a later survey. The tornado continued into Barry County, where one person was killed in Purdy. In Barry County, several buildings were damaged including numerous houses, a church, four mobile homes and many outbuildings. The tornado lifted just southeast of McDowell. Debris from the storm such as letters, bills and foam traveled as far east as the Springfield area about 80 miles (130 km) to the east of the hardest hit region in southwestern Missouri.

== See also ==
- Weather of 2008

== Notes and footnotes ==
=== Further reading ===
- Narramore, Jen (May 10, 2019). "Picher, OK - Neosho, MO EF4 tornado - May 10, 2008". National Weather Service Wichita, Kansas.
