= Northeast Oklahoma Railroad =

Overview
- Locale: Oklahoma and Kansas
- Dates of operation: 1906–1967

Technical
- Track gauge: 4 ft 8 1/2 in (1,435 mm) standard gauge
- Length: 34 miles (55 km)

The predecessor rail lines which eventually came together as the Northeast Oklahoma Railroad (“NEO”) started as early as 1906, with some routes continuing until NEO was merged into the St. Louis-San Francisco Railroad (“Frisco”) in 1967. At its maximum, NEO ran approximately 34 miles of track in the area of the Tri-state mining district of southeast Kansas, northeast Oklahoma and southwest Missouri, although NEO itself only had operations in Kansas and Oklahoma.

== History ==
The Oklahoma, Kansas and Missouri Inter-Urban Railway Company was incorporated September 26, 1908 in Oklahoma, for the purpose of constructing a line from Miami, Oklahoma by way of Hattonville (later known as Commerce, Oklahoma) to Baxter Springs, Kansas, about 22 miles. The Miami-to-Commerce segment was actually built in the 1908-1909 timeframe, about 4.2 miles. In 1916, the line was extended from Commerce through Cardin and Picher to the mining camp of Century, Oklahoma, a/k/a Douthat, about 7.6 miles. This gave the route an upside-down “fishhook” shape, extending north from Miami to Cardin, easterly to Picher, and then south to Century. The railroad changed its name to the Oklahoma, Kansas and Missouri Railway Company on May 8, 1917. This was purchased on December 1, 1919, by the Northeast Oklahoma Traction Co., which had been incorporated July 25 of that year. The assets were then moved to the Northeast Oklahoma Railroad Co., which was incorporated December 29, 1919. While the tracks had been operated by steam locomotion or by two gas-electric railcars up to this point, the new owner electrified the line on June 30, 1921, although some steam operations continued. At its maximum extent, this NEO segment had not only the Miami-to-Century route, but also a branch north to a local settlement known as Westville, Kansas added in 1922, and a branch north to Columbus, Kansas added in 1923, producing total trackage of about 24.1 miles, together with 27 miles of sidings.

Another NEO forerunner, the Southwest Missouri Railroad (“SMRR”), was incorporated August 16, 1906 in Missouri. On August 23, 1906, it acquired two streetcar lines known as the Webb City Northern Electric Railroad and the Southwest Missouri Electric Railway, which both had trackage in the Tri-state mining district. However, SMRR itself was organized as a common carrier railroad, and it proceeded to build a regular-gauge electrified line from Carthage, Missouri through Webb City, Missouri and Baxter Springs, Kansas to Picher, Oklahoma, about 77 miles, in the 1906-1907 timeframe. At its absolute maximum, the line had about 94 miles of track. But receivers were appointed for the railroad in 1926, and on April 27, 1939, the Baxter Springs-to-Picher segment was sold to NEO, with the tracks east of Baxter Springs abandoned and torn up. NEO got 5.556 miles of mainline and 4.17 miles of sidetracks, for a total of 9.726 miles of track.

NEO itself was purchased by Eagle-Picher, then a lead and zinc mining company in the Tri-state district, in 1938. NEO was subsequently sold by Eagle-Picher to the Frisco effective in 1964. NEO continued operating under its own name until 1967 when it was dissolved and its assets absorbed by the Frisco.
