= Zincville, Oklahoma =

- Ghost town
- Nicknames: Berlin, Schwarz, St. Louis
- Location within Oklahoma Location within the United States
- Coordinates: 36°59′29″N 94°48′32″W
- Country: United States
- State: Oklahoma
- County: Ottawa
- Incorporated: 1917
- Dissolved: 1954
- Elevation: 827 ft (252 m)
- Time zone: UTC-6 (Central (CST))
  - Summer (DST): UTC-5 (CDT)
- GNIS feature ID: 1100958

Zincville is a ghost town and former mining community in Ottawa County, Oklahoma, United States. It is located between Picher and Hockerville, near the Kansas-Oklahoma border.

== History ==
A post office opened in 1917 and the town featured religious organizations as well as a railroad. Mining activity ceased operation in 1954, spearheading the end of activity in the town.

=== Renamings ===
The town was formed in 1917, and started out being named Berlin. Due to the fact that there was already another town in Oklahoma named Berlin, they changed the name to Schwarz, after the towns lease holder, Charles E Schwarz. This name was temporary, thus the town being switched to the name of St. Louis, named after a mining company in the town. Finally, it was renamed Zincville in 1919.

== See also ==
- List of ghost towns in Oklahoma
