= Treece, Kansas =

Ghost town in Cherokee County, Kansas

- Ghost town
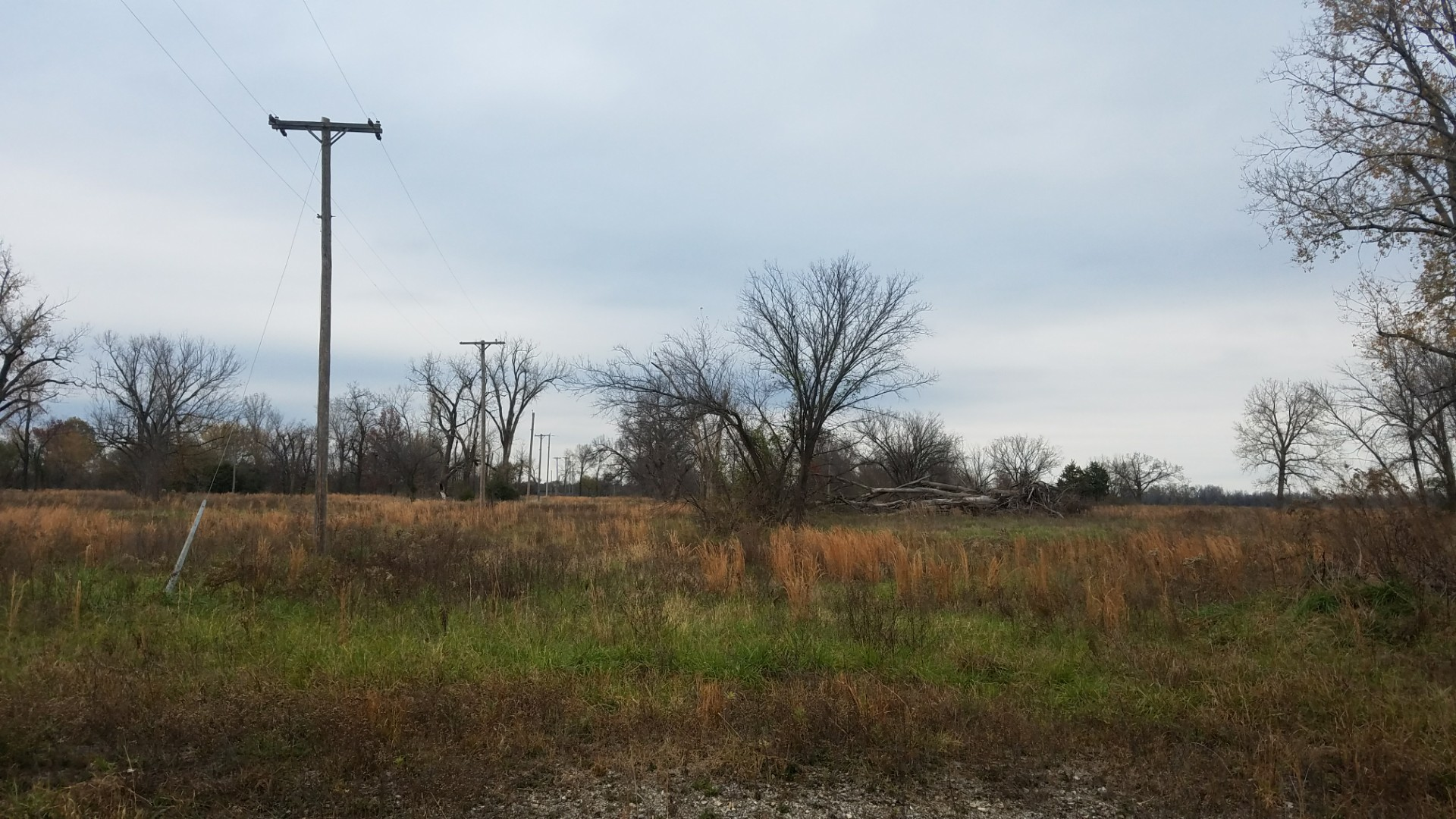
- Treece (2016)

- Location within Cherokee County and Kansas

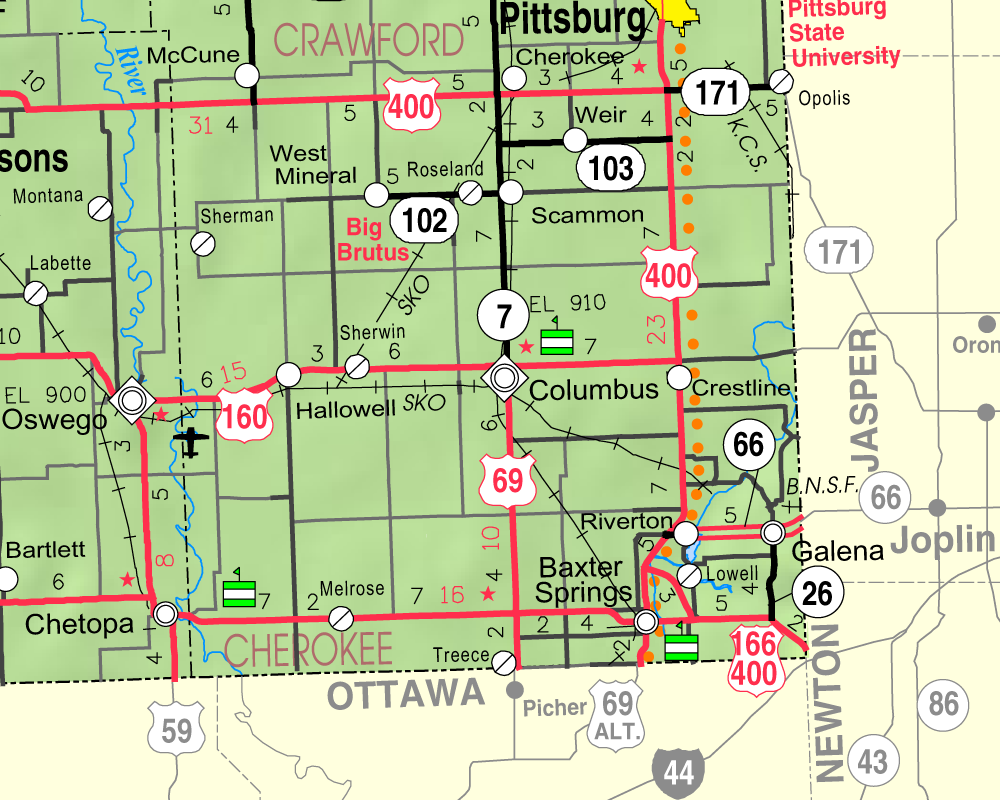
- KDOT map of Cherokee County (legend)
- Coordinates: 37°0′3″N 94°50′36″W
- Country: United States
- State: Kansas
- County: Cherokee
- Founded: 1910s
- Disincorporated: 2012

Area
  - Total: 0.077 sq mi (0.2 km^{2})
  - Land: 0.077 sq mi (0.2 km^{2})
  - Water: 0 sq mi (0.0 km^{2})
- Elevation: 840 ft (260 m)

Population (2010)
  - Total: 138
  - Estimate (2016): 1
  - Density: 1,800/sq mi (690/km^{2})
- Time zone: UTC-6 (CST)
  - Summer (DST): UTC-5 (CDT)
- ZIP Code: 66778
- Area code: 620
- FIPS code: 20-71350
- GNIS ID: 469375

Treece is a ghost town in Cherokee County, Kansas, United States, and part of the historic Tri-State Mining District. As of the 2010 census, the city population was 138. As of May 2012 the city was abandoned and most buildings and other facilities demolished due to pervasive problems with lead pollution resulting from past mining. Two people who had refused an Environmental Protection Agency (EPA) buyout remained in 2012, one of whom died in 2016.

== History ==
Treece and neighboring former cities Picher, Cardin and Douthat were formed as a result of mining operations in the early 20th century. Realtor J. O. Treece lent the town his name. The first post office in Treece was established in 1917. Treece was a major supplier of lead, zinc, and iron ore. During its maximum production, Treece and Picher combined had a population of over 20,000 and produced $20 billion worth of ore mainly during World War I and World War II. After the 1970s, ore production declined rapidly as did the city's population. In 1981 the Environmental Protection Agency deemed the Tri-State Mining District as contaminated and promised to take actions to clean up the area.

The cleanup of Tri-State Mining District lands was divided for EPA purposes into a total of four National Priority List (NPL) Superfund Sites: the Cherokee County Site (Cherokee County, Kansas); the Orongo-Duenweg Site (Jasper County, Missouri); the Newton County Mine Tailings Site (Newton County, Missouri); and the Tar Creek Site (Ottawa County, Oklahoma). The Cherokee County Superfund Site was in turn divided into seven subsites that were grouped and divided into nine operable units (OUs). The area around Treece was designated OU4. Thus, while Treece is located less than a mile north of Picher, Oklahoma, a town which was closed due to lead pollution, Treece was located at a different Superfund site. Picher's residents' property was bought out by the Environmental Protection Agency. Residents of Treece also demanded a buy-out, but at first were not certain of receiving one. As of September 2009, it was reported that the U.S. Environmental Protection Agency wanted to clean up the soil in Treece, instead of moving its residents away. Congress, however, passed an environmental appropriations bill on October 29, 2009, that authorized the EPA to buy out the town. Residents had until August 31, 2010 to apply for a Federal buyout and offers were to be made to the 80 residents who applied in December.

Effective April 5, 2012, House Bill 2412 dissolved any Kansas city that had received public money from the EPA for the buyout or relocation of its residents during 2010 or 2011. Treece was the only city that met those criteria and therefore ceased to exist as a municipality on that date.

As of May 2, 2012, only one couple had rejected the buyout offer and remained in Treece living in a double-wide trailer. Other than their location all other facilities in the former city have been sold, moved, or demolished.

=== Contamination ===
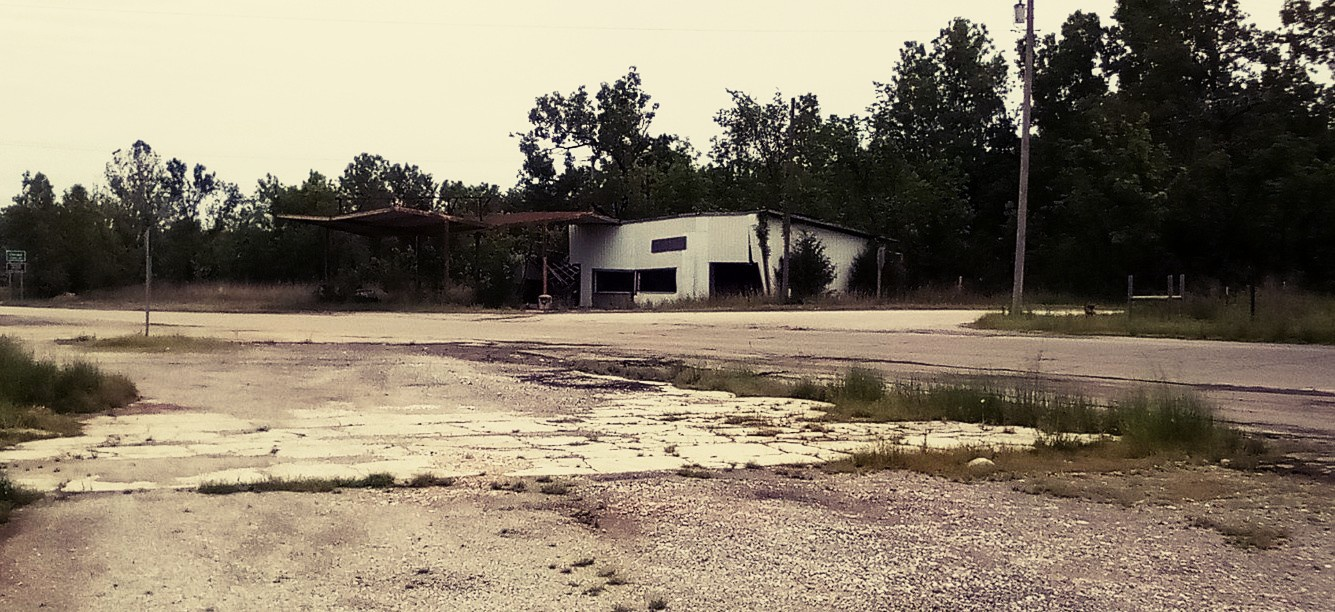
Treece, Kansas, circa 2023

Treece, Kansas, was deemed as uninhabitable and contaminated by the Environmental Protection Agency because of the large chat piles and leftover mine tailings that still exist in the abandoned town today. Wes Enzinna, a writer for The New York Times, visited Treece in 2010 and interviewed some of the remaining residents. They claimed that years before Treece was ruled contaminated by the EPA, children who swam in the local Tar Creek Superfund site would end up with chemical burns (superficially resembling sunburn) all over their bodies.

The reason that the chat piles and mine tailings are so dangerous is because of the high amount of lead that is still left in the rock. While short-term exposure to lead will not necessarily harm a person, if one is exposed for long periods of time, which the people living in Treece were, it can result in high blood pressure, heart disease, kidney disease, and reduced fertility. No studies have been done to determine the effects that the toxic environment left on the health of former residents of Treece, Kansas.

Some of the chat piles in Treece are up to 200 ft (61 m) tall and the dust that is blown off from these piles "still contains enough metal to make blood-lead levels among young children here three times higher than the national average". The residents of Treece had been dealing and living with dangerous amounts of toxic waste in their backyards for 50–60 years before anything was done to clean up the area.

When the mining companies stopped mining, they shut off the water pumps that kept the mines from flooding. When the floodwater traveled through the mining tunnels, it picked up all the leftover traces of minerals that were left behind. The water then found its way into the local Tar Creek and other streams, contaminating the water and ruining the habitat of the local wildlife.

== Geography ==
Treece is located in southeastern Kansas, adjacent to the Kansas-Oklahoma border just west of U.S. Route 69. Picher, Oklahoma lies one mile to the south.

According to the United States Census Bureau, the city had a total area of 0.1 square miles (0.26 km^{2}), all land.

== Demographics ==
Historical population
Census	Pop.	Note	%±
1930	749		—
1940	568		−24.2%
1950	378		−33.5%
1960	280		−25.9%
1970	225		−19.6%
1980	194		−13.8%
1990	172		−11.3%
2000	149		−13.4%
2010	138		−7.4%
2016 (est.)	1		−99.3%
U.S. Decennial Census, Census 2000

=== 2010s ===
As of May 2012, one couple who had rejected an EPA buyout offer remained in Treece.

On August 30, 2016, Timothy Busby, one of the two remaining Treece residents, died at the age of 54. He is survived by his wife, Della Busby, who lived with him in Treece until his death, as well as their three grown children and other relatives.

=== 2000 census ===
As of the census of 2000, there were 149 people, 59 households, and 37 families residing in the city. The population density was 2,134.9 inhabitants per square mile (824.3/km^{2}). There were 66 housing units at an average density of 945.6 per square mile (365.1/km^{2}). The racial makeup of the city was 85.91% White, 7.38% Native American, 2.01% African American, and 4.70% from two or more races. Hispanic or Latino of any race were 0.67% of the population.

There were 59 households, out of which 33.9% had children under the age of 18 living with them, 47.5% were married couples living together, 10.2% had a female householder with no husband present, and 35.6% were non-families. 33.9% of all households were made up of individuals, and 18.6% had someone living alone who was 65 years of age or older. The average household size was 2.53 and the average family size was 3.26.

In the city the population was spread out, with 30.9% under the age of 18, 7.4% from 18 to 24, 25.5% from 25 to 44, 19.5% from 45 to 64, and 16.8% who were 65 years of age or older. The median age was 37 years. For every 100 females, there were 96.1 males. For every 100 females age 18 and over, there were 106.0 males.

The median income for a household in the city was $22,500, and the median income for a family was $28,125. Males had a median income of $26,250 versus $33,125 for females. The per capita income for the city was $10,122. There were 20.0% of families and 26.4% of the population living below the poverty line, including 40.5% of under eighteens and 19.0% of those over 64.

== See also ==
- List of Superfund sites in Kansas

Next door communities that were also closed down and razed:

- Picher, Oklahoma
- Cardin, Oklahoma
