= Miami Public Schools =

School district in Oklahoma, United States

Miami High School

Location
- 2000 East Central Avenue; Miami, (Ottawa County), Oklahoma 74354; United States
- Coordinates: 36.873820°N 94.852969°W

Information
- Type: Public high school
- Principal: Amie Whitehill
- Staff: 34.50 (FTE)
- Enrollment: 457 (2023-24)
- Student to teacher ratio: 13.25
- Colors: Blue and white
- Nickname: Wardogs
- Website: Miami High School

Miami Public Schools (MPS) is a school district headquartered in Miami, Oklahoma. Its attendance area includes most of the city; the northern portion is instead in Commerce Public Schools. MPS also includes the Dotyville census-designated place.

Jeremy Hogan became the superintendent in 2016. That year the district estimated that due to cutbacks in aid from the Oklahoma state government, it would have $619,000 less and $700,000 less in fiscal years 2017 and 2018, respectively.

Hogan began a strategic planning program in 2017.

In 2021, Hogan stepped down, becoming the superintendent in Collinsville. He was replaced by Nick Highsmith.

== Schools ==
Secondary

- Miami High School
- Will Rogers Middle School

Elementary

- Nichols Upper Elementary School
- Roosevelt
- Washington
- Wilson

Pre-Kindergarten is at Washington and Wilson elementaries.

Alternative

- Miami Academy

Other facilities
