= Ottawa County, Oklahoma =

County in Oklahoma, United States

- County
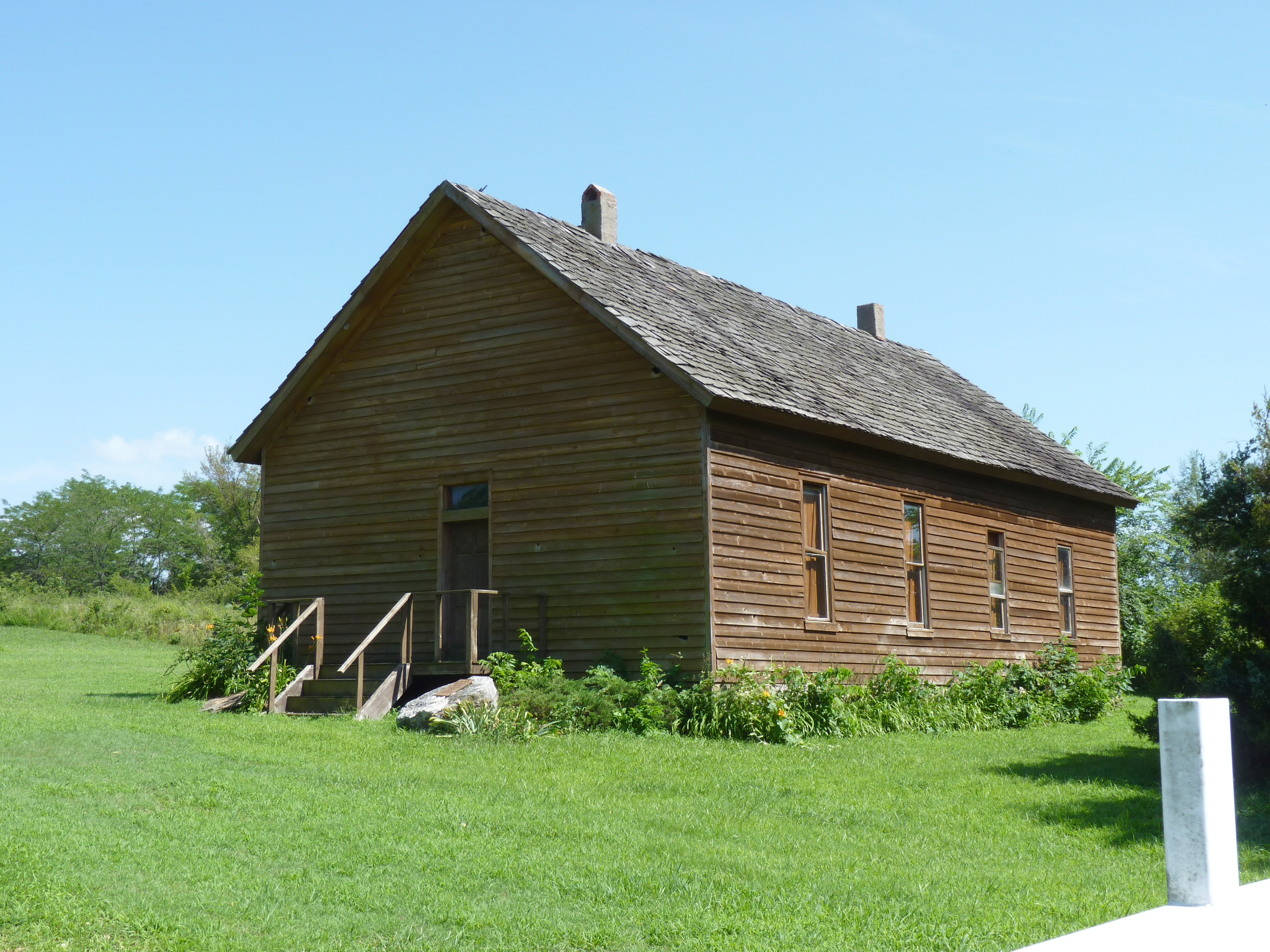
- Modoc Mission Church (2010)

- Location within the U.S. state of Oklahoma
- Coordinates: 36°50′N 94°49′W
- Country: United States
- State: Oklahoma
- Founded: 1907
- Named for: Ottawa Tribe of Oklahoma
- Seat: Miami
- Largest city: Miami

Area
  - Total: 485 sq mi (1,260 km^{2})
  - Land: 471 sq mi (1,220 km^{2})
  - Water: 14 sq mi (36 km^{2}) 2.8%

Population (2020)
  - Total: 30,285
  - Estimate (2025): 30,438 ▲
  - Density: 64.3/sq mi (24.8/km^{2})
- Congressional district: 2nd
- Website: ottawaok.gov

Ottawa County is a county located in the northeastern corner of the U.S. state of Oklahoma. As of the 2020 census, the population was 30,285. Its county seat is Miami. The county was named for the Ottawa Tribe of Oklahoma. It is also the location of the federally recognized Modoc Nation and the Quapaw Nation, which is based in Quapaw. Ottawa County comprises the Miami micropolitan statistical area, which is included in the Joplin-Miami, MO-OK combined statistical area. The county borders both Kansas and Missouri. The county was an important lead and zinc mining region during the early 1900s, and in 1983, the Tar Creek Superfund site was inaugurated to clean up tailings and prevent groundwater and waterway contamination with leachates.

== History ==
Archaeological studies indicate this area was inhabited for thousands of years by succeeding cultures of prehistoric indigenous peoples. According to the Encyclopedia of Oklahoma History and Culture, at the start of the 20th century, eight Archaic sites (6000 BC to 1 AD), 16 Woodland sites (1 to 1000 AD), and six Plains Village sites (1000 to 1500 A D) were known.

The Osage Nation had moved into the area from Missouri and Kansas by the 19th century, under pressure from European-American encroachment on their lands. They ceded this land to the federal government in exchange for another area farther west in Indian Territory. In 1828, the Western Cherokee, the first group of this nation to relocate west of the Mississippi River, ceded their land in Western Arkansas to the government in exchange for some of the land just vacated by the Osage.

In 1831, the federal government reacquired part of what would eventually become Ottawa County to forcibly relocate several other tribal nations that had been systematically displaced from the Midwest under its Indian Removal program. These included two tribes of Iroquois, Shawnee, Quapaw, Peoria, Kaskaskia, Miami, Ottawa and Wyandotte. The Neosho Agency administered the affairs of these tribes from 1837 until 1871. In that year, it was renamed as the Quapaw Agency, serving only the tribes in Indian Territory.

The Modoc band led by Captain Jack in northern California was exiled and relocated here in 1873, after being taken as prisoner following their defeat in the Modoc War. The 153 members were settled at the Quapaw Agency. After regaining federally recognized status in 1978 as the Modoc Tribe of Oklahoma, they were given land of their own under federal trust in this county. Native Americans make up nearly 17% of the population in the county.

This county is part of the Tri-State district, a center of lead and zinc mining through the first half of the 20th century. Unrestricted mining resulted in severe environmental degradation, and mining centers such as Picher, Oklahoma, in the county were included within the Tar Creek Superfund Site in 1980. In 1996, the government found that 34% of the children of Picher had lead poisoning due to groundwater, air, and dust effects. Environmental remediation was conducted, but the state and federal governments have since closed Picher as a city and relocated nearly all its residents since the early 21st century.

== Geography ==
According to the U.S. Census Bureau, the county has a total area of 485 square miles (1,260 km^{2}), of which 14 square miles (36 km^{2}) (2.8%) are covered by water. It is the fourth-smallest county in Oklahoma by area. The eastern part of the county lies in the Ozark Plains, while the western is in the Neosho Lowlands.

=== Adjacent counties ===
- Cherokee County, Kansas (north)
- Newton County, Missouri (east)
- McDonald County, Missouri (southeast)
- Delaware County (south)
- Craig County (west)

== Demographics ==
Historical population
Census	Pop.	Note	%±
1910	15,713		—
1920	41,108		161.6%
1930	38,542		−6.2%
1940	35,849		−7.0%
1950	32,218		−10.1%
1960	28,301		−12.2%
1970	29,800		5.3%
1980	32,870		10.3%
1990	30,561		−7.0%
2000	33,194		8.6%
2010	31,848		−4.1%
2020	30,285		−4.9%
2025 (est.)	30,438	▲	0.5%
U.S. Decennial Census; 1790–1960 1900–1990; 1990–2000 2010–2019

=== 2020 census ===
As of the 2020 census, the county had a population of 30,285. Of the residents, 23.4% were under the age of 18 and 20.0% were 65 years of age or older; the median age was 40.2 years. For every 100 females there were 97.1 males, and for every 100 females age 18 and over there were 94.3 males.

The racial makeup of the county was 63.9% White, 1.0% Black or African American, 18.8% American Indian and Alaska Native, 0.5% Asian, 1.8% from some other race, and 13.1% from two or more races. Hispanic or Latino residents of any race comprised 5.6% of the population.

There were 11,859 households in the county, of which 30.4% had children under the age of 18 living with them and 27.8% had a female householder with no spouse or partner present. About 28.9% of all households were made up of individuals and 14.4% had someone living alone who was 65 years of age or older.

There were 13,714 housing units, of which 13.5% were vacant. Among occupied housing units, 68.7% were owner-occupied and 31.3% were renter-occupied. The homeowner vacancy rate was 2.1% and the rental vacancy rate was 10.2%.

=== 2000 census ===
As of the 2000 census, there were 14,100 households, of which 30.90% had children under the age of 18 living with them, 55.60% were married couples living together, 10.70% had a female householder with no husband present, and 29.80% were non-families. About 26.60% of all households were made up of individuals, and 13.60% had someone living alone who was 65 years of age or older. The average household size was 2.48 and the average family size was 2.98.

In the county, the population was spread out, with 25.70% under the age of 18, 9.70% from 18 to 24, 24.80% from 25 to 44, 22.90% from 45 to 64, and 16.90% who were 65 years of age or older. The median age was 37 years. For every 100 females, there were 94.30 males. For every 100 females age 18 and over, there were 90.10 males.

The median income for a household in the county was $27,507, and the median income for a family was $32,368. Males had a median income of $25,725 versus $18,879 for females. The per capita income for the county was $14,478. About 13.00% of families and 16.60% of the population were below the poverty line, including 23.80% of those under age 18 and 12.20% of those age 65 or over.

== Politics ==
Voter Registration and Party Enrollment as of June 30, 2023
Party	Number of Voters	Percentage
Democratic	5,204	29.60%
Republican	8,856	50.36%
Others	3,525	20.05%
Total	17,585	100%

Prior to 2008, Ottawa County was a swing county in presidential elections, backing the national winner in all but three presidential elections from 1912 to 2004. It has since become a Republican stronghold similar to the rest of the state, with Donald Trump's 2024 53 point win over Kamala Harris being the most lopsided margin of victory in the county's electoral history.

United States presidential election results for Ottawa County, Oklahoma
Year	Republican		Democratic		Third party(ies)	
Year	No.	%	No.	%	No.	%
1908	1,174	45.75%	1,297	50.55%	95	3.70%
1912	1,315	45.82%	1,384	48.22%	171	5.96%
1916	1,642	43.85%	1,875	50.07%	228	6.09%
1920	5,270	54.80%	3,974	41.33%	372	3.87%
1924	5,197	50.08%	4,522	43.58%	658	6.34%
1928	8,144	64.03%	4,488	35.28%	88	0.69%
1932	3,210	28.19%	8,175	71.81%	0	0.00%
1936	4,697	37.84%	7,658	61.70%	57	0.46%
1940	5,738	42.05%	7,873	57.69%	35	0.26%
1944	5,056	46.19%	5,876	53.69%	13	0.12%
1948	4,304	37.27%	7,243	62.73%	0	0.00%
1952	7,211	51.87%	6,692	48.13%	0	0.00%
1956	6,730	54.05%	5,721	45.95%	0	0.00%
1960	6,520	53.33%	5,705	46.67%	0	0.00%
1964	4,090	35.02%	7,589	64.98%	0	0.00%
1968	5,000	44.48%	4,820	42.88%	1,421	12.64%
1972	8,348	68.63%	3,657	30.07%	158	1.30%
1976	4,985	39.83%	7,446	59.50%	84	0.67%
1980	6,362	49.25%	6,143	47.55%	414	3.20%
1984	7,666	56.76%	5,781	42.81%	58	0.43%
1988	5,026	42.85%	6,658	56.77%	45	0.38%
1992	4,141	31.35%	6,304	47.73%	2,764	20.93%
1996	4,127	35.87%	5,844	50.80%	1,533	13.33%
2000	5,625	49.29%	5,647	49.49%	139	1.22%
2004	7,443	59.41%	5,086	40.59%	0	0.00%
2008	6,905	61.80%	4,268	38.20%	0	0.00%
2012	6,466	64.82%	3,509	35.18%	0	0.00%
2016	7,631	71.38%	2,584	24.17%	475	4.44%
2020	8,545	74.71%	2,686	23.48%	207	1.81%
2024	8,490	75.95%	2,511	22.46%	177	1.58%

== Economy ==
=== Mining economy ===
Lead and zinc mining has been important to the county economy since 1890, and Quapaw lands have been exploited for mining, first by lease. They were restricted in terms of receiving royalties and were generally excluded by discrimination from mining jobs. By 1910, the local mining industry was controlled by a few large corporations, including Commerce Mining and Royalty Company, the Eagle-Picher Company, the Childers Mining Company, the LaClede Lead and Zinc Company, and the American Lead and Zinc Company.

In 1926, at the region's peak of production, Ottawa County was the largest source of lead and zinc in the world. By the 1960s most of the mines had closed, leaving mine shafts, sinkholes, chat piles, and other dangers for future cleanup. Such areas have been designated as part of the Tar Creek Superfund Site by the US Environmental Protection Agency. Tripoli, primarily used as an abrasive, was found near Peoria in 1912, and was mined into the twenty-first century.

=== Contemporary tourism ===
Today, Ottawa County, together with nearby Delaware County to the south, have a large impact on tourism in Oklahoma. Said counties combined are the third-largest tourism destination in the state, following only the Oklahoma City and Tulsa metropolitan areas.

== Communities ==
=== Cities ===
- Miami (county seat)
- Commerce

=== Towns ===
- Afton
- Fairland
- North Miami
- Peoria
- Quapaw
- Wyandotte

=== Census-designated places ===
- Dotyville
- Narcissa

=== Unincorporated communities ===
- Lincolnville

=== Ghost towns ===
- Cardin
- Douthat
- Hockerville
- Picher
- Potter
- Zincville

== Education ==
School districts include:

- Afton Public Schools
- Commerce Public Schools
- Fairland Public Schools
- Miami Public Schools
- Quapaw Public Schools
- Welch Public Schools
- Wyandotte Public Schools
- Turkey Ford Public School (elementary only)

Picher-Cardin Public Schools was in operation until 2009.

== Transportation ==
=== Major highways ===
- I-44 / Will Rogers Turnpike
- US 59
- US 60
- US 69
  - US 69 Alt.
- SH-10
  - SH-10C
- SH-25
- SH-69A
- SH-125

== NRHP sites ==
The following sites are in Ottawa County are listed on the National Register of Historic Places:

- Cities Service Station, Afton
- Coleman Theatre, Miami
- George L. Coleman Sr. House, Miami
- Commerce Building/Hancock Building, Miami
- Dobson Family House, Miami
- Horse Creek Bridge, Afton
- John Patrick McNaughton Barn, Quapaw
- Miami Downtown Historic District, Miami
- Miami Marathon Oil Company Service Station, Miami
- Miami Original Nine-Foot Section of Route 66 Roadbed, Miami
- Modoc Mission Church and Cemetery, Miami
- Narcissa D-X Gas Station, Miami
- Nine Tribes Tower, Miami
- Ottawa County Courthouse, Miami
- Peoria Indian School, Miami
- Peoria Tribal Cemetery, Miami
- Riviera Courts--Motel, Miami
- Tri-State Zinc and Lead Ore Producers Association Office, Picher
- Isaiah Walker House, Wyandotte

== See also ==
- Quapaw Indian Agency
