= Merlyn Mantle =

American writer

- Born: Merlyn Louise Johnson; January 28, 1932; Cardin, Oklahoma, U.S.
- Died: August 10, 2009 (aged 77); Plano, Texas, U.S.
- Resting place: Sparkman-Hillcrest Memorial Park Cemetery
- Occupation: Author
- Known for: Wife of Mickey Mantle
- Spouse: Mickey Mantle (m. 1951; died 1995)
- Children: 4

Merlyn Mantle (née Johnson; January 28, 1932 – August 10, 2009) was an American author and wife of New York Yankees outfielder Mickey Mantle.

== Early life ==
Mantle was born in Cardin in Ottawa County in far northeastern Oklahoma. She was the first of two daughters born to Giles and Reba Johnson. She had a sister, Pat, who was three years her junior.

While attending high school, she met Mickey Mantle two years before his debut in Major League Baseball. Mickey was a baseball player at Commerce High School, while Merlyn was a cheerleader at the rivaling Picher High School. Their first date took place at a movie theater along the famed Route 66 in Miami, Oklahoma.

== Marriage and family ==
On December 23, 1951, Merlyn married Mantle, following his rookie season with the New York Yankees. The couple had four sons: Mickey, Jr. (April 12, 1953 – December 20, 2000), David (born December 26, 1955), Billy (December 5, 1957 – March 12, 1994), and Danny (born March 19, 1960). They remained married for 43 years, until Mantle's death in 1995, although they were estranged during his final years. Mantle died of liver cancer on August 13, 1995. Their son, Billy, was diagnosed with Hodgkin's disease, but died of a heart attack in 1994, aged 36. Another son, Mickey Jr., died of non-Hodgkin's lymphoma in 2000, aged 47.

Merlyn Mantle was treated for alcoholism at the Betty Ford Clinic, a problem which also afflicted her husband and three of her sons. In an interview with the New York Daily News shortly after her husband's death in 1995, Merlyn Mantle spoke of the negative impact that alcohol had over her family's life: "I was in there partying and doing the same thing as Mick. That was our life and I was part of it; I can't deny that. It ruins families."

In 1996, Merlyn co-wrote a memoir of Mickey Mantle's life entitled Hero All His Life. The book was co-written with her sons, Danny Mantle and David Mantle, and writer Mickey Herskowitz.

Merlyn Mantle and Greer Johnson, Mickey Mantle's agent and former live-in aide, became involved in a legal dispute over the rights to auction off Mickey Mantle's possessions in 1997. The two sides reached a settlement, ensuring the sale of some of Mickey Mantle's belongings for approximately $500,000.

Merlyn Mantle's last public appearance was on August 5, 2008, at a dinner for the memorial service of former Yankees player Bobby Murcer. She was unable to attend Murcer's service the following morning because of health issues.

== Death ==
Merlyn Mantle died of pneumonia at a hospice in Plano, Texas, on August 10, 2009, at the age of 77. She had been suffering from Alzheimer's disease. She was interred next to her husband and two sons at Dallas's Sparkman-Hillcrest Memorial Park Cemetery.
