= Miami area =

Miami area may refer to:

- Miami metropolitan area in southern Florida, United States
- Miami, Oklahoma micropolitan area, United States
