= Modoc Mission Church and Cemetery =

Historic church in Oklahoma, United States

- U.S. National Register of Historic Places
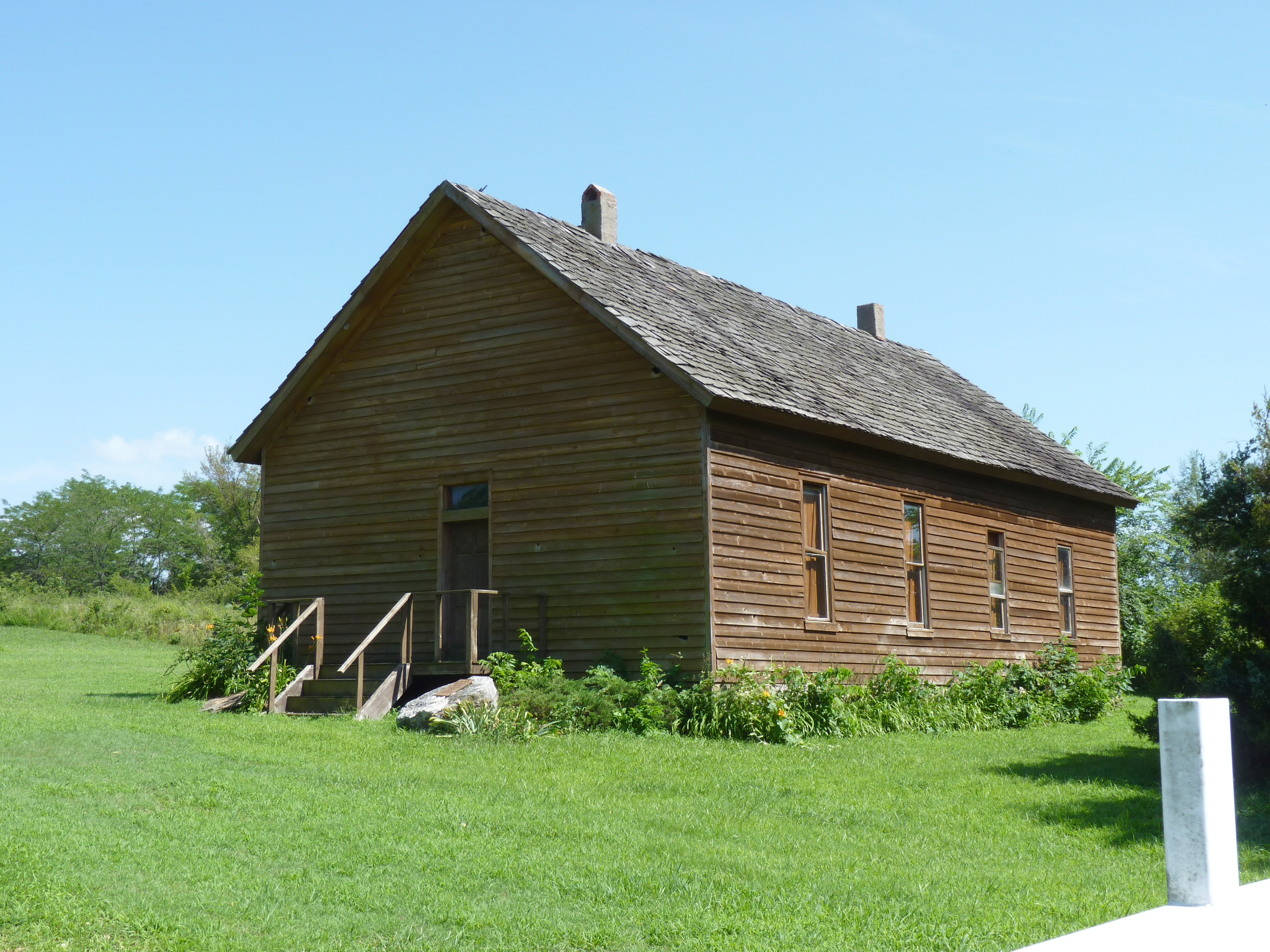

- Location within Oklahoma Location within the United States
- Nearest city: Miami, Oklahoma
- Coordinates: 36.86472°N 94.66194°W
- Area: 7 acres (2.8 ha)
- Built: 1892
- Built by: Charles W. Goddard
- NRHP reference No.: 80003293
- Added to NRHP: February 15, 1980

Modoc Church and Cemetery is a historic mission church and cemetery in Miami, Oklahoma.

It was built in 1892 and added to the National Register of Historic Places in 1980. The listing included four contributing buildings.

== Background and Historical Significance ==
=== After the Modoc War—Removal to Indian Territory ===
Following the Modoc War of 1872–1873, Modoc warriors Keintpoos (commonly referred to as Captain Jack), Schonchin John, Black Jim, and Boston Charley were tried by the Military Commission for War Crimes. Their gallows were constructed before the trial, foreshadowing the decision of the trial. The four warriors were hanged on October 3 of 1873 at Fort Klamath, Oregon.

The remaining Modoc people and two other leading warriors, Barncho and Slolux, were forced to watch. At the last minute, Barncho and Slolux were chosen to be sent to Alcatraz instead of being hanged with the other four Modoc warriors.[4] Nine days later, on October 12 of 1873, the remaining Modoc people were moved from Fort Klamath on wagons, beginning a journey to an undisclosed location. After stopping to send Barncho and Slolux to Alcatraz, there were 153 Modoc people that transitioned from wagons to cattle train cars, accompanied by soldiers in two additional cars. The boys and the men of the group were chained down to the train car, perceived to be potential risks. The cattle cars traveled East for about 2,000 miles.[5] On November 16, 1873, they landed in Baxter Springs, Kansas. At this point in time, they were handed over to be under the supervision of an Indian Agent by the name of Hiram Jones.

=== Arrival at Quapaw Agency ===
Under the supervision of Indian Agent Jones, the Modoc people were to set up residency at the Quapaw Agency in Northeastern Oklahoma. On the first day that they arrived, led by their own Scar-faced Charley, the Modoc people, with the help of 3 outsiders, created temporary wooden barracks with some people using tents for shelter. Their shelters and temporary barracks needed to last them through the winter, until June of the following year. Having just arrived in the middle of November, the first winter after removal for the Modoc people would be difficult for multiple reasons. The Modoc people did not receive any funding from the United States Government for necessities such as food, clothing, and medical supplies until four months after their displacement, in March 1874. Due to the hardships and poor conditions, there was an increasing death rate throughout the first decade that the Modoc people lived in the Quapaw Agency. By the time of allotment, in 1891, there were 68 Modoc people who were able to claim allotments. Many of them had been born after removal.

=== Corruption ===
In the 1870s, it was not unheard of for there to be rings of corruption, known as “Indian Rings,” involving the Office of Indian Affairs and Indian Agents. The Indian Agents were responsible for distributing resources to the Native communities that they were responsible for. This left room for Indian Agents to partner with politicians and local merchants to use the resources nefariously. Because of this, Indian Agencies began to be placed in the hands of religious groups. The Quapaw Agency was associated with the Society of Friends, or Quakers. The Indian Agent assigned, Hiram Jones, was a Quaker. Agent Jones was supervised by Superintendent of the Central Indian Superintendency, Enoch Hoag, who was also a Quaker. It was found in 1878, after multiple reports from Modoc people and local residents, that there was corruption and nepotism happening within the Quapaw Agency officials. Indian Agent Jones and Superintendent Hoag were found to have formed a family Quaker Indian Ring where 11 out of the 12 employees of the Quapaw Agency were relatives of either Hoag or Jones. Agent Jones, since the arrival of the Modoc people, had banned them from reading with anyone besides a nearby shop, that was run by his first cousin, T. E. Newlin. Claims by the Modoc people and nearby town residents of corruption dated back to 1874 and 1875, yet they were dismissed. Ultimately, Jones and Hoag were dismissed from their positions in 1879.

=== Survival ===
Navigating the conditions of the Quapaw Agency, the Modoc people assimilated to white ways of life as a means of survival. Receiving inadequate funding, they looked towards different sources of supplementary income. Many of the men searched for work with the neighboring farmers. Others worked to haul materials to local towns. Some of the women received income through selling their art of beadwork and intricate handwoven baskets. Both the men and the women worked on the development of their own field crops, as well as livestock herds.

== History of the Building ==
=== Education ===
After arriving at the Quapaw Agency, there was a strong dedication of the Modoc people to become educated. Within 6 weeks, there were 25 children going to school at the Quapaw Boarding School. Just 6 years after the Modoc were removed to Oklahoma, the federal government scheduled for a building to be built on the Modoc reservation, a 4000-acre area. It was to serve as both a school and a church. The Modoc people continued to educate their youth, by sending them to relatively local boarding schools. Some Modoc students were sent to Carlisle Boarding School. It was not until after the death of Adam McCarty that the Modoc people became more hesitant to send their children to boarding schools. Adam McCarty was the stepson of Schonchin John, one of the four Modoc warriors that was hanged at Fort Klamath after the Modoc War.

=== The Society of Friends ===
Being associated with the local Quaker community and Indian Agency Quakers, many of the Modoc people converted their religious beliefs to Quaker faith. In 1881, it was the faith of the majority of the Modoc people. Some were even inclined to become ministers. Notably, Steamboat Frank, or Modoc Frank, was one of the first recorded Native ministers of the Society of Friends. He had requested to be sent to a Seminary in Vassalboro, Maine. While there, he became sick and attempted to make it home to see his family, as his illness was getting worse. Steamboat Frank passed away in Portland, Maine in the summer of 1886. He was buried at a Society of Friends cemetery there.

=== Modoc Cemetery ===
In 1891, the Society of Friends decided to purchase and relocate the church and school building. They did not move it far but moved it to be right next to the Modoc Cemetery. The earliest dated grave at the cemetery is for Rosie Jack, who died in April 1874. Rosie was the daughter of Keintpoos, Captain Jack. After this relocation, they renovated it to have more space for living quarters. Many other Modoc people that fought during the Modoc War are buried here as well; some have unmarked graves.

=== Recognition and Renovation ===
Once the Modoc Nation became federally recognized by the government in 1978, one of their first acts was to apply to the Department of Housing and Urban Development to buy the Modoc Church and associated lands. Once the purchase had been completed, they worked to restore the building to its original appearance. This was the last year that the church was used for prayer meetings. Two years later, in 1980, the Church and Cemetery were registered within the National Register of Historic Places. Afterward, renovation began on the building itself. In 1884, there was a celebration commemorating the church building. Later, in 1988, the Major William McBride Chapter of the National Society of United States Daughters of 1812 sponsored the placement of a historical marker at the church.
