= North Miami, Oklahoma =

- Town
- Location within Ottawa County and the state of Oklahoma
- Coordinates: 36°55′12″N 94°52′47″W
- Country: United States
- State: Oklahoma
- County: Ottawa

Area
  - Total: 0.19 sq mi (0.49 km^{2})
  - Land: 0.19 sq mi (0.49 km^{2})
  - Water: 0 sq mi (0.00 km^{2})
- Elevation: 807 ft (246 m)

Population (2020)
  - Total: 290
  - Density: 1,531.4/sq mi (591.26/km^{2})
- Time zone: UTC-6 (Central (CST))
  - Summer (DST): UTC-5 (CDT)
- ZIP code: 74358
- Area codes: 539/918
- FIPS code: 40-52700
- GNIS feature ID: 2413054

North Miami is a town in Ottawa County, Oklahoma, United States. The population was 290 at the 2020 census. The town is primarily a bedroom community for several larger towns in the county.

== Geography ==
The town is 4 miles (6.4 km) north of Miami on U.S. Highway 69 (formerly U.S. Highway 66). It is south of Commerce, Oklahoma. The Miami Regional Airport is to the southwest.

According to the United States Census Bureau, the town has a total area of 0.2 square miles (0.52 km^{2}), all land.

== Demographics ==
Historical population
Census	Pop.	Note	%±
1920	483		—
1930	503		4.1%
1940	393		−21.9%
1950	486		23.7%
1960	472		−2.9%
1970	503		6.6%
1980	544		8.2%
1990	450		−17.3%
2000	433		−3.8%
2010	374		−13.6%
2020	290		−22.5%
U.S. Decennial Census

North Miami is part of the Joplin, Missouri metropolitan area.

=== 2020 census ===
As of the 2020 census, North Miami had a population of 290. The median age was 44.0 years. 23.4% of residents were under the age of 18 and 24.5% of residents were 65 years of age or older. For every 100 females there were 110.1 males, and for every 100 females age 18 and over there were 105.6 males age 18 and over.

100.0% of residents lived in urban areas, while 0.0% lived in rural areas.

There were 131 households in North Miami, of which 29.8% had children under the age of 18 living in them. Of all households, 37.4% were married-couple households, 26.0% were households with a male householder and no spouse or partner present, and 26.0% were households with a female householder and no spouse or partner present. About 29.8% of all households were made up of individuals and 16.0% had someone living alone who was 65 years of age or older.

There were 144 housing units, of which 9.0% were vacant. The homeowner vacancy rate was 1.0% and the rental vacancy rate was 0.0%.

Racial composition as of the 2020 census
Race	Number	Percent
White	180	62.1%
Black or African American	0	0.0%
American Indian and Alaska Native	57	19.7%
Asian	0	0.0%
Native Hawaiian and Other Pacific Islander	0	0.0%
Some other race	12	4.1%
Two or more races	41	14.1%
Hispanic or Latino (of any race)	24	8.3%

=== 2000 census ===
As of the 2000 census, there were 433 people, 169 households, and 125 families residing in the town. The population density was 2,232.8 inhabitants per square mile (862.1/km^{2}). There were 194 housing units at an average density of 1,000.4 per square mile (386.3/km^{2}). The racial makeup of the town was 64.20% White, 21.94% Native American, 0.23% Asian, 2.77% from other races, and 10.85% from two or more races. Hispanic or Latino of any race were 4.39% of the population.

There were 169 households, out of which 33.1% had children under the age of 18 living with them, 53.8% were married couples living together, 12.4% had a female householder with no husband present, and 26.0% were non-families. 23.1% of all households were made up of individuals, and 10.7% had someone living alone who was 65 years of age or older. The average household size was 2.56 and the average family size was 3.00.

In the town, the population was spread out, with 28.6% under the age of 18, 9.5% from 18 to 24, 24.9% from 25 to 44, 21.9% from 45 to 64, and 15.0% who were 65 years of age or older. The median age was 36 years. For every 100 females, there were 89.1 males. For every 100 females age 18 and over, there were 96.8 males.

The median income for a household in the town was $23,125, and the median income for a family was $30,521. Males had a median income of $26,806 versus $17,708 for females. The per capita income for the town was $10,087. About 13.0% of families and 15.9% of the population were below the poverty line, including 12.6% of those under age 18 and 19.6% of those age 65 or over.

== Education ==
It is within the Commerce Public Schools school district.
