= John Patrick McNaughton Barn =

- U.S. National Register of Historic Places
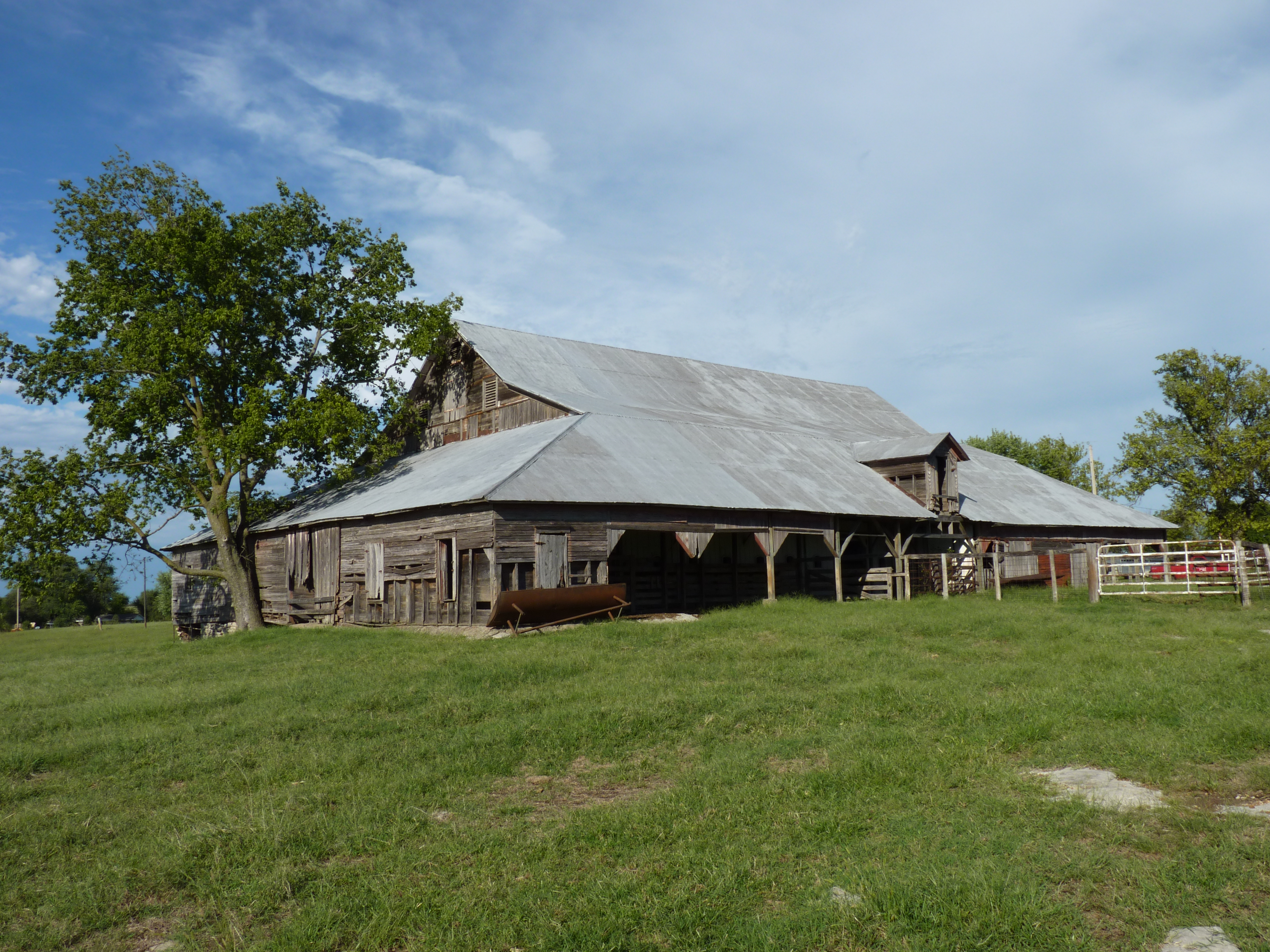
- The McNaughton Barn in May 2007
- Location: Ottawa County, Oklahoma
- Nearest city: Miami, Oklahoma
- Coordinates: 36°53′54″N 94°47′08″W
- Built: 1893
- NRHP reference No.: 91001903
- Added to NRHP: December 27, 1991

The John Patrick McNaughton Barn, also known as the McNaughton Barn or the Max Mirage View Farm Barn, is a 3½ story wooden barn located in Ottawa County near Miami, Oklahoma. Built on a rising hill in 1893 as a multi-purpose barn, the McNaughton Barn is still in use today at the Ankenman Ranch, a working cattle ranch.

The barn stands on a limestone foundation dug from the hill itself. The structure covers approximately 9600 ft² (842 m^{2}), laid out in a symmetrical, 80 ft by 120 ft (24.3 m by 36.5 m) rectangle with a long, low Dutch hip roof. There is a single gabled dormer on the south side. A cupola can be seen in early photographs of the barn, but it was lost or removed sometime after 1906.

The first floor has two aisles of stalls, with dirt floors as part of the barn's foundation. One aisle holds 16 stalls for large draft horses, and the other contains 10 stalls for smaller horses and stallions. Each stall has a small window, a grain bin, and a hay trough. The hay trough is fed by a chute from the hay racks on the second floor. The livestock entrances, on the south and east sides of brace posts, are sheltered under the barn's roof. The ground floor has four large grain storage areas, floor scales, three tack rooms, an office, a repair and storage area, and a chute from the grain storage areas on the second floor.

The second floor, accessed by a wide staircase, holds the grain storage area and hay racks. In earlier times, sleeping quarters for visitors were located on the second floor. A portion of the third floor, accessed by a narrow set of stairs, is open to the second floor, to allow the second floor hay to cure. A pulley system with trap doors to the first floor was used to raise grain to this floor, which was then poured into one of the three grain columns for distribution to the livestock and other storage areas.

Over a century of hard work and Oklahoma weather, the barn gradually fell into disrepair. It was listed on the National Register of Historic Places in 1991 as an "outstanding local example of a massive prairie barn." The Ankenman Ranch began restoration of the McNaughton Barn in 2001, and completed the effort in 2002.

John Patrick McNaughton Barn
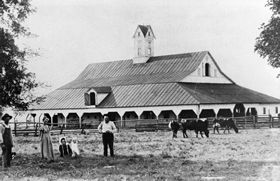
A 1906 photograph of the McNaughton Barn

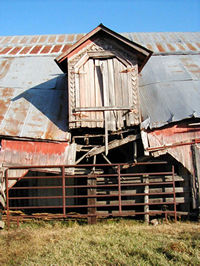
The gabled dormer on the barn near collapse prior to restoration

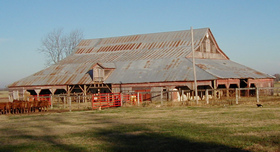
The McNaughton Barn in 2001, prior to extensive renovation
