= Modoc Nation =

Native American tribe in Oklahoma

Total population
- 356 (2025)

Regions with significant populations
- United States (Oklahoma)

Languages
- English

Religion
- Christianity (Quaker), traditional tribal religion

Related ethnic groups
- other Modoc, Klamath, Yahooskin

The Modoc Nation is a federally recognized tribe of Modoc people, located in Ottawa County in the northeast corner of Oklahoma, and Modoc and Siskiyou counties in northeast California. The smallest tribe in the state, they are descendants of Captain Jack's band of Modoc people, removed in 1873 after the Modoc Wars from their traditional territory in northern California and southern Oregon. They were exiled to the Quapaw Agency in Indian Territory (now Oklahoma), where they were colocated with the Shawnee people from east of the Mississippi River.

In the 1950s, the federally recognized status of the Klamath Reservation (where other Modoc live) and the Modoc was terminated, ending federal assistance to the two tribes. The Modoc tribe in Oklahoma later reorganized independently and gained federal recognition in 1978. They have also acquired a land base and have introduced bison to their area. They have pursued several avenues of economic development in what was an inhospitable environment compared to Northern California.

== Government ==
Map of Modoc Nation's tribal jurisdictional area (OTSA) and nearby jurisdiction areas.

The Modoc Nation is headquartered in Miami, Oklahoma, and based largely in Ottawa County. Of the 250 enrolled tribal citizens, 120 live within the state of Oklahoma.

As of 2025, the current administration is:

- Chief: Robert Burkybile
- Second Chief: Gina McGaughey

Burkybile succeeded Bill Follis, who was instrumental in securing renewed federal recognition in 1978. The tribe's federal recognition had been terminated in the 1950s, along with that of the Klamath Reservation, where other Modoc people lived. The Modoc tribal jurisdictional area falls within Ottawa County, Oklahoma. Follis also led the tribe in acquiring a land base.

The tribe's government complex includes an archive and library.

== Economic development ==
The Modoc Nation operates a housing authority; a casino established in 1998, together with the Miami Nation; and Red Cedar Recycling, founded in 1996 and open to the larger community. They manage the Modoc Bison Project and are a member of the Inter-Tribal Bison Council. They also issue their own tribal license plates. The casino, known as The Stables, is located in Miami, Oklahoma, and includes a restaurant and gift shop.

Red Cedar Recycling provides free cardboard and paper recycling for area businesses and residents; they also pay the market rate for aluminum to recycle. The tribal company provides educational materials about recycling and hosts tire recycling events.

In the 21st century, the tribe engaged in what is known as "payday lending", considered controversial for the often high rates of fees charged to customers. It allowed a corporation to be formed under the tribe's name and legal status in order to bypass state usury laws. While the tribe maintains nothing illegal was done, the leader of the corporation, Scott Tucker was convicted of financial violations and sentenced in January 2018 to more than 16 years in federal prison. His company and others involved were ordered to pay $1.3 billion by the Federal Trade Commission. Today, the tribe independently engages in "payday lending" on a far smaller scale, which generates revenue.

== History ==
The people of the Modoc Nation traditionally occupied some 5,000 square miles of the interior of what is now the California-Oregon border. While their tribal territory encompassed a small area, it was one of great biological diversity. The west was bordered by the Cascade Mountains; to the east was a barren wasteland of alkali flats; forests of Ponderosa pines bordered the north, and what is known as the Lava Beds National Monument formed the southern boundary.

Descended from Indigenous cultures who had been in the region for 10,000 years, the historic Modoc were culturally unique. They spoke the Klamath language, as did the neighboring (and competing) Klamath people. Occasionally, they formed war parties to drive out unwelcome visitors or raid neighboring tribes. The Modoc were hunters, fishermen, and gatherers who followed the seasons for food. They lived their lives in relative obscurity. The arrival of European Americans in the early 19th century began to encroach on their territory, and their lives were changed.

The intrusion of fur traders, followed by European settlers into the Pacific Northwest, had a variety of social and economic effects on the Native populations. The Modoc bartered with fur traders for guns and horses, which they found necessary to compete with neighboring tribes. But eventually the traders and the prospectors gave way to farmers and ranchers, who competed for land and resources and had little regard for the Native inhabitants. These new American invaders traveled west in the mid-19th century by way of the Oregon Trail, which passed directly through traditional Modoc lands.

The Modoc learned to live peacefully with the farming and ranching newcomers, often working for them and trading for livestock and other necessities. But the flow of non-Indians into their ancestral homelands had an enormous effect on the culture of the Modoc people. They embraced many of the settlers' ways. Eventually they adopted clothing patterned after non-Indians, with whom they socialized in the nearby town of Yreka, California.

The Modoc sometimes used names given to them by white people. For instance, Kintpuash (Modoc, c. 1837–1873) became known as Captain Jack, while other men were documented in American records as Scarfaced Charley, Steamboat Frank, Bogus Charley, Shack Nasty Jim, Long Jim, Curly-headed Doctor, and Hooker Jim.

The increasing number of settlers needed more land to farm and to graze. As a result of the enormous pressure of white infiltration into Indian lands in California and Oregon, the Modoc, Klamath, and Yahooskin Band of Snake tribes ceded their lands to the United States government and signed a joint reservation treaty in 1864. The Modoc agreed to live alongside the Klamath Indians, although these peoples were traditional enemies.

Life on the reservation was difficult. The more numerous Klamath harassed the Modoc, and the Indian agent neglected them. The Modoc became increasingly frustrated. By 1865, Captain Jack led his band of Modoc off the reservation and returned to their territory of the Lost River (California) area of Northern California.

The treaty signed in 1864 was not ratified by the US Senate until 1870. For two years Captain Jack refused to return to the Klamath reservation, requesting separate property on the Lost River for the Modoc. But with his band in violation of the treaty, the U.S. Army determined to capture the wandering Modoc and return them to the Klamath reservation in Oregon. The confrontation caused the explosive Modoc War.

=== Modoc War ===
With the outbreak of fighting, the Modoc warriors retreated with their wives and children to the nearby Lava Beds. They used the many caves for their defense and refuge. For almost six months, Captain Jack worked with his 57 braves to withstand an army that came to number over a 1,000 men. The military small arms were supported by mountain howitzers and coehorn mortars.

Captain Jack lost only six men by direct combat, while the U.S. Army suffered 45 dead. The latter included E.R.S. Canby, the only United States Army general to lose his life in an Indian war. In April 1873 at a peace commission meeting, Captain Jack and others killed General Edward Canby and Rev. Eleazer Thomas, and wounded two others, mistakenly believing this would encourage the Americans to leave. The Modoc War is estimated to have cost the United States government at least half a million dollars. Given the small number of warriors, this was probably the costliest Indian war ever fought. In comparison, the cost of land for the reservation requested by the Modoc on Lost River was estimated at $10,000.

The war finally ended on June 1, 1873, with the surrender and capture of the Modoc, who were unable to keep themselves supplied with food. Captain Jack and five of his warriors: Schonchin John, Black Jim, Boston Charley, Barncho, and Sioux, were charged with war crimes. They are the only Native Americans to be tried by a military commission on such charges. Gallows were constructed before the trial began, and it was evident the verdicts would be death by hanging. The date set for the execution was October 3, 1873. Captain Jack, Barncho and Sioux were convicted and sentenced to death.

But just before the executions were to take place, the commission commuted the sentences of Barncho and Sioux to life imprisonment at Alcatraz Island in California. The men were not told of the change until after they, along with the other Modoc men, women and children, were forced to watch the execution of Captain Jack.

=== Exile from Oregon ===
To solve the conflict between the Modoc and Klamath at the reservation, the US Commissioner of Indian Affairs (now Bureau of Indian Affairs) decided to relocate the Modoc far to the east, to the Quapaw Agency in northeastern Indian Territory. The Modoc were ordered to pack all their belongings for a long journey but were not told of their destination. On October 12, 1873, 155 Modoc: 42 men, 59 women, and 54 children, were loaded on 27 wagons and departed Fort Klamath, Oregon under guard of Captain H.C. Hasbrouck and soldiers of Battery B, 4th Artillery.

A week later the large expedition stopped for the first time near Yreka, California. When they reached Redding, California, military guards took Barncho and Sioux away from the main group to prison at Alcatraz Island. The remaining Modoc were put aboard a train and housed in cattle cars. None of the people had seen a train before, and they were frightened of the noise and movement. Their four railroad cars were coupled between two other cars filled with soldiers. Guards with loaded muskets stood at the doors of each car day and night. All of the men and boys capable of bearing arms were shackled within the cars, adding to their distress. In this stage, they were transported to Fort D.A. Russell in Wyoming Territory.

Nearing the fort, the Army officers received orders to take the Modoc prisoners to Fort McPherson, Nebraska. Finally arriving there October 29, Captain Hasbrouck turned his charges over to Captain Melville C. Wilkinson, US Army, Special Commissioner in Charge of Indian Removal. The prisoners were placed temporarily on an island in the Platte River, a few miles from the fort, where they hunted and fished for food.

Given the detour to Nebraska, the Modoc were forced to travel 2,000 miles during the cold of late fall, not reaching Baxter Springs, Kansas, until November 16, 1873. The 153 Modoc men, women, and children arrived cold and hungry in this part of Indian Territory.

In Baxter Springs, Captain Wilkinson conferred with Hiram W. Jones, Indian Agent at the Quapaw Agency, as to where to place the Modoc. They decided to locate the band on Eastern Shawnee land, to be supervised directly by Agent Jones. But Jones' Quapaw Agency had not been supplied with additional goods to outfit the prisoners: 153 persons who had little but loose blankets on their backs. With Scarfaced Charley in command and one day's help from three non-Indians, the Modoc built their own temporary wood barracks two hundred yards from the agency headquarters. Some were housed in tents. These accommodations were to be their home until June 1874, when the Office of Indian Affairs purchased 4,000 acres for their reservation from the Eastern Shawnee.

The Quapaw Agency was located on Eastern Shawnee land in the northeast corner of Indian Territory, now Ottawa County, Oklahoma. It was bounded on the north by the Kansas state line and on the east by the Missouri line. The Cherokee Nation formed its western and southern boundaries. The agency had been a sub-agency of the Neosho Agency until 1871, when they were jurisdictionally separated. The tribes constituting the Quapaw Agency were the Confederated Peoria, Eastern Shawnee, Miami, Ottawa, Quapaw, Seneca, and Wyandotte.

Captain Wilkinson remained with his charges until the second week in December. When he left the agency, he reported to the Commissioner of Indian Affairs, "on the cars, in the old hotel used for them at Baxter, I found them uniformly obedient, ready to work, cheerful in compliance with police regulations, and with each day providing over and over that they only required just treatment, executed with firmness and kindness to make them a singularly reliable people."

Agent Jones reported no difficulties in enforcing the strictest discipline, although one small area of friction had developed. Some Modoc gambled, resulting in some instances in losing what few possessions they had. When Scarfaced Charley, who had become chief, refused to interfere, Jones appointed Bogus Charley as chief. He served as chief until 1880, when the federal government ended formal Modoc tribal government in Oklahoma for almost 100 years. It appointed officials through the Bureau of Indian Affairs.

=== Indian Territory ===
The first years following removal to Indian Territory were difficult for the Modoc. They suffered much sickness and many hardships due to the corrupt, cruel administration of Agent Jones. During their first winter at the Quapaw Agency, the government did not provide any food, clothing, or medical supplies to them. Jones and the Quapaw Agency did not receive funds for their support for nearly a year after their arrival, when $15,000 was allocated.

Under such conditions, the death rate of children and the aged was especially high. By 1879, after six years at the Quapaw Agency, 54 people had died and only 99 remained of the tribe. By the time of the allotments of communal land to Modoc households in 1891 under the Dawes Act, only 68 adults were left. Many had been born after removal. Especially in the early years, the people depended for their very survival on gifts of money and clothing from eastern charitable organizations, representing many people who were outraged by the government's poor treatment of the Modoc.

During the 1870s the Office of Indian Affairs was rife with corruption; Indian agents were known to bill the U.S. Government for resources intended for the tribes, which were diverted to private sales. These so-called Indian Rings operated on a joint conspiracy between one politician, one Indian agent, and at least one local merchant.

President Ulysses S. Grant tried to eliminate such graft by appointing religious groups and leaders to take over the Indian agencies. The Quakers, or Society of Friends, were prominent appointees among the new Indian agents. The Quakers in charge of the Quapaw Agency in the 1870s were from the same Society of Friends who claim credit for successfully proposing the original Indian "Peace Policy" to President Ulysses S. Grant.

Quaker Hiram W. Jones was the Indian agent at the Quapaw Agency when the 153 Modoc prisoners of war arrived there in 1873. He reported to fellow Quaker, Enoch Hoag, who was Superintendent of the Central Indian Superintendency headquarters in Lawrence, Kansas. As it happened, Jones' wife and Hoag's wives were first cousins. Grant's efforts to eliminate corruption did not succeed here. As historian Albert Hurtado wrote, "the Modoc were victims of a Quaker Indian ring that operated at the Quapaw Agency for nearly a decade during the 1870s". Of the 12 agency employees, 11 were relatives of Agent Jones or Superintendent Hoag.

Soon after the Modoc were settled at the Quapaw Agency, Agent Jones restricted them from trading with anyone but a store next to the agency building; they were prohibited from going to merchants in nearby Seneca, Missouri. Superintendent Hoag's first cousin, T. E. Newlin, operated the store. When Seneca residents filed numerous complaints concerning the intolerable conditions suffered by the Modoc, their claims were dismissed by the federal government. Congressional representatives thought these represented disgruntled merchants who were bitter at being cut out of the lucrative Modoc trade.

The Modoc mortality rate continued to climb. Because of persistent complaints by the Modoc and their non-Indian neighbors, Jones' Indian Agency was investigated by the Office of Indian Affairs in 1874 and again in 1875, but few changes and no criminal charges were made as a result. Following a third investigation in 1878, his system of nepotism and corruption was officially reported. Jones and his family members were described as receiving kickbacks from local merchants for the inflated prices and inferior quality of goods and services provided to the agency. It was not until 1879 that Hiram Jones and his family ring were relieved of their duties at the Quapaw Agency.

The Modoc men and women persevered in adapting to survive. They worked at anything that brought income. The men worked on the farms of their white neighbors, and hauled materials and supplies to surrounding towns. The women sold their beadwork and intricately woven basketry. Both men and women worked in the fields.

Soon they were cultivating their own land and continued to improve the condition and productivity of their farmlands and livestock herds. They were described as improving each year in assimilationist practices of dress, farming, house maintenance, and encouraging their children in reservation and other schools. The Quapaw Agency staff considered them superior among the tribes they supervised.

During the Fall of 1874, Alfred Meacham, one of the four peace commissioners who had met Captain Jack during the Modoc War, visited the Modoc at Quapaw Agency. He was planning a lecture tour of eastern states related to his adventures during the war and tried to recruit men from among the Modoc. He received agency permission for Scarfaced Charley, Shacknasty Jim and Steamboat Frank to accompany him on the tour.

The Modoc were very interested in obtaining an education for their children. Six weeks after removal, 25 of their children had started to attend the Quapaw boarding school some 12 miles north of the agency. Less than one year later, the children were reported as rapidly learning English, and many of the adults also learned to read and write. In 1879, the government constructed a building on the Modoc Reservation that served as both a school and a church. Several of the children later attended the Carlisle Indian School near Arkansas City, Kansas. However, after the death of Adam McCarty, a stepson of Schonchin John, at Carlisle, Modoc families were reluctant to send their children away to school.

The Modoc also became active in the church established for them by the Society of Friends. By 1881, most had converted to the Quaker faith. Three of Captain Jack's warriors, formerly referred to as "blood thirsty and savage renegades," became recorded ministers of the Friends Church. Steamboat Frank, who later took the name Frank Modoc, was the first full-blood American Indian to become a recorded minister of the Society of Friends. He was also the Modoc Church's first minister.

To prepare for the ministry, Frank requested to attend Oak Grove Seminary in Vassalboro, Maine. While there, he became ill. Realizing death was near and wanting to return home to be with his only child, Elwood, he left the seminary. He traveled as far as Portland, Maine, where he died June 12, 1886. He is buried in the Friends Cemetery there.

In 1891, the Society of Friends purchased the church building and relocated it to the current site on County Road S679 adjoining the Modoc Cemetery. The building was enlarged to include living quarters for the Friends missionary and his family. Services were conducted on Sunday and prayer meetings on Wednesday night. With a declining congregation at a time when some Native Americans were returning to traditional practices, in the fall of 1978, the Society of Friends held the last meeting for worship in the church.

== Termination and recognition ==
The Modoc Tribe in Oklahoma was terminated under a congressional act in the 1950s intended to stimulate assimilation. Citizens of the tribe maintained an identity and applied to gain official recognition, which was successful in May 1978. This restored the tribe's special relationship with the federal government and made citizens eligible for Federal assistance. Among their early actions was the purchase of the Modoc Church and its four acres from the Society of Friends. They gained a grant from the U.S. Department of Housing and Urban Development to restore the church. An additional $24,000 from the Oklahoma Historical Society made it possible to complete restoration of the church.

The Modoc Friends Church and Cemetery were placed on the National Register of Historic Places in 1980, the first site so designated in Ottawa County, Oklahoma. Shortly thereafter renovation of the church began, and its dedication on June 10, 1984, celebrated the completion. In 1988, the Major William McBride Chapter, National Society United States Daughters of 1812, placed a historical marker at the church.

The first marked grave in the Modoc Cemetery is inscribed as Rosie Jack, died April 1874. Rosie was the daughter of Captain Jack and his "young wife" Lizzie. Many of the leading participants of the Modoc War were buried in the cemetery in unmarked graves. The church and its cemetery symbolize the losses suffered by the 153 Modoc prisoners of war from the nineteenth century.

Following the Nez Perce War with the United States, Chief Joseph and his people were forcibly removed from their homelands in the Northwest to Fort Leavenworth, Kansas, in 1877. Eight months later they were transported by train to Baxter Springs, Kansas. The weakened and sick Nez Perce could not complete the walk to the Quapaw Agency. The Modoc were hired as teamsters to transport the people to Modoc Springs on the reservation, where they set up a temporary camp.

The Nez Perce did not remain long with the Modoc. Less than six months later, Jones had them transferred a few miles north to the Peoria Reservation. Eventually, they were transferred to the Ponca Agency in the western portion of Indian Territory; later they were moved to sites in Washington State and Idaho.

== Twentieth century to present ==
Pursuant to the Act of March 3, 1909, the United States government allowed the Modoc to return to Oregon. Records indicate that 29 returned; however, several had gone back prior to 1909. Both the Modoc who returned and those who chose to remain in Oklahoma were enrolled at the Klamath Agency. As the years passed, the Modoc language, customs and culture were forgotten.

The Modoc and Klamath tribes were terminated under the Indian termination policy from federal supervision by the Klamath Termination Act, or Public Law 587, enacted on August 13, 1954. At Congressional hearings during 1965, testimony showed the Modoc living in Oklahoma, Kansas, and Missouri had not been properly notified that their tribe would be terminated simultaneously with the Klamath Reservation, as none of the public notices identified that the termination included the Modoc.

Several years later all tribes in the northeastern corner of Oklahoma banded together to establish the Inter-Tribal Council, Inc. of Northeastern Oklahoma. At that time, the Modoc formed an unofficial tribal government. Bert Hayman, whose mother had been one of the youngest prisoners of war, became the first tribal chairman; followed by Vernon "Dutch" Walker, grandson of James Long, the "Youngest Modoc Warrior."

In a special section of the "Reinstatement Act" of 15 May 1978 reversing all of the Oklahoma Termination Acts it addresses the Modoc Tribe of Oklahoma confirming that the provisions of the Klamath Termination Act did not apply to them except as provided for sharing in future claims against the United States.

Bill G. Follis, great-grandson of James Long, became chairman in 1973. When the tribe was granted Federal Recognition in 1978, Chief Follis became the first federally recognized chief of the Modoc in Oklahoma since the death of Bogus Charley in 1880. There were several Modoc chiefs at the Quapaw Agency after Bogus but they were only recognized as such by the Modoc people.

Chief Follis, an avid horseman and rancher, continued to lead the Modoc Tribe of Oklahoma until his death in 2022. He was responsible for obtaining federal recognition for the tribe and reestablishing a tribal land base. The Modoc Tribal Complex, located at 515 G Street, S.E., Miami, Oklahoma was completed in the early part of 1982. The complex houses tribal headquarters, tribal archives and library. The library is the only one in the area dedicated solely to Native American history and genealogy. Chief Follis also initiated numerous economic programs such as Red Cedar Recycling, opened to the community in 1996. In 1998, the Modoc and Miami tribes entered into a joint venture to establish The Stables; an off-track betting and high-stakes bingo establishment located next door to the Modoc Tribal Complex. Also, under Chief Follis' leadership, the tribe reintroduced bison to the Modoc prairie with a thriving and ever-growing herd. Today, the tribal office administers numerous federal and state programs that benefit tribal citizens, as well as other Native Americans in the area.
