= Hockerville, Oklahoma =

- Ghost town
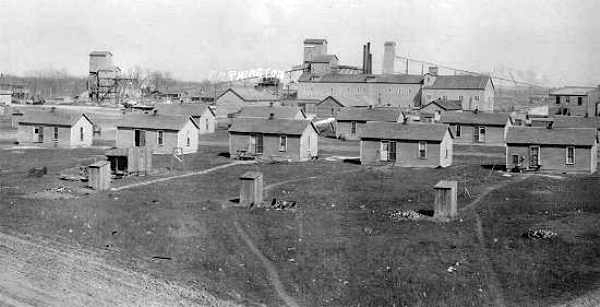
- Hockerville, 1918

- Location within Oklahoma Location within the United States
- Coordinates: 36°59′38″N 94°46′52″W
- Country: United States
- State: Oklahoma
- County: Ottawa
- Elevation: 853 ft (260 m)
- Time zone: UTC-6 (Central (CST))
  - Summer (DST): UTC-5 (CDT)
- GNIS feature ID: 1093811

Hockerville is a ghost town in northern Ottawa County, Oklahoma, United States. Hockerville was a mining community near the Kansas-Oklahoma border; it once had more than 500 residents. At least 18 mines operated in the Hockerville area in 1918 alone.

== Geography ==
The community was located just south of the Kansas-Oklahoma border between Picher to the west and Baxter Springs, Kansas, to the northeast.

== History ==
The settlement was named for Leslie C. Hocker, an early resident. A post office operated from 1918 to 1963.

Circa 1918, Hockerville was billed as "the young, substantial, and progressive young city of the Oklahoma Mining District"; the area was home to at least 18 mines.

Hockerville's population was 550 in 1940.

The area was mined for zinc ore and lead from the early 1900s to the late 1970s, leaving in a 40-square-mile (100 km^{2}) area—which includes Hockerville—contaminated by toxins, and part of the Tar Creek Superfund Site.

== Education ==
Picher-Cardin Public Schools, which was the local school district, closed in 2009. The area was placed into Quapaw Public Schools.
