= Picher-Cardin Public Schools =

Defunct school district in Oklahoma, USA

Picher-Cardin Public Schools was a school district headquartered in Picher, Oklahoma.

The district operated an elementary school, a junior high school, and a high school. In later periods, it was organized only into an elementary school and a high school.

It served Picher, Cardin, and Hockerville — places now in the Tar Creek Superfund.

Before 2005, when the state began sponsoring entities buying out houses in the district due to unsafe conditions, the district had 350 students. By 2005 it no longer served various lower grades because the buyout specifically targeted families with children enrolled in kindergarten and first grade. In February 2007 there was an effort to end operations of the school district but this did not yet happen. In the 2008–2009 school year the district had grades 3 to 12 and had 51 students, including 11 in the 12th grade and two co-valedictorians. On April 7, 2009, voters voted to abolish the district with 55 in favor and six against.

Bob Walker once served as a superintendent, and the final superintendent was Don Barr.

The Quapaw Public Schools and the Commerce Public Schools took students of the former district, along with district property.
