= Quapaw Public Schools =

School district in Oklahoma

Quapaw Public Schools is a school district headquartered in Quapaw, Oklahoma. Its area includes, in addition to Quapaw, Cardin, Peoria, Picher, and Hockerville.

It includes an elementary school, a middle school, and a high school.

As of 2026 David Carriger is the superintendent. He uses social media as a way of notifying parents and staff about developments in the district.

In 2009, Picher-Cardin Public Schools closed due to declining population and contamination of the two towns, the Quapaw district took some of the students, and property.

== Schools ==
- Quapaw High School
- Quapaw Middle School
- Quapaw Elementary School
