= Trece =

Trece is the Spanish term for thirteen. It may refer to the following:

- Trece (Paraguayan television network)
- Trece (Spanish TV channel)
- Trece, a nickname for Trece Martires, Cavite, Philippines
- Trece, a mask of American professional wrestler Ricky Mandel
