= Cardin, Oklahoma =

Town in Oklahoma, United States

- Ghost Town
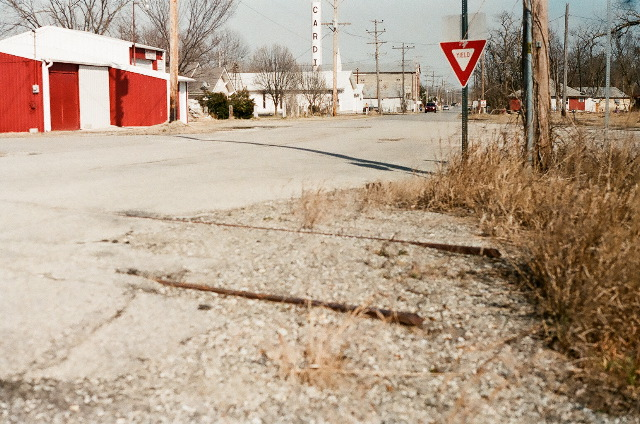
- A view of downtown Cardin in 2008.

- Location within Ottawa County and the state of Oklahoma showing former municipal boundaries
- Coordinates: 36°58′32″N 94°51′6″W
- Country: United States
- State: Oklahoma
- County: Ottawa

Area
  - Total: 0.077 sq mi (0.2 km^{2})
  - Land: 0.077 sq mi (0.2 km^{2})
  - Water: 0 sq mi (0.0 km^{2})
- Elevation: 810 ft (247 m)

Population (2010)
  - Total: 0
  - Density: 0.0/sq mi (0.0/km^{2})
- Time zone: UTC-6 (Central (CST))
  - Summer (DST): UTC-5 (CDT)
- ZIP code: 74335
- Area codes: 539/918
- FIPS code: 40-11900
- GNIS feature ID: 1090958

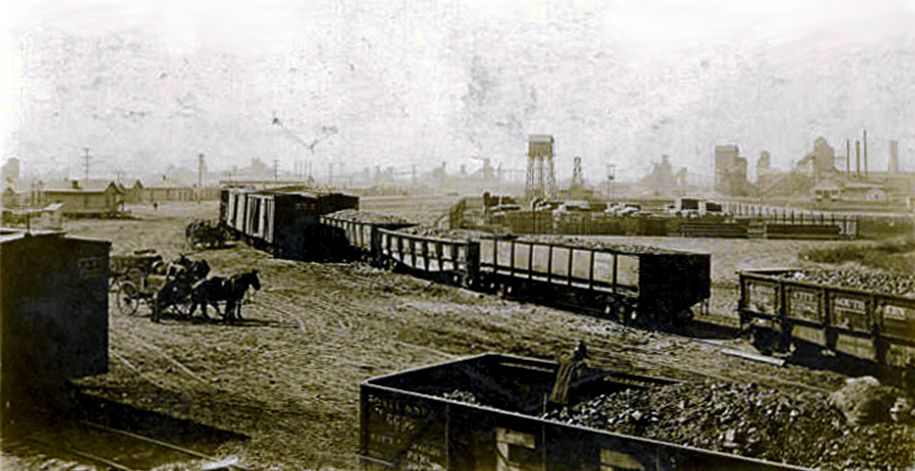
View of Cardin mines, plant, and railyard in 1922

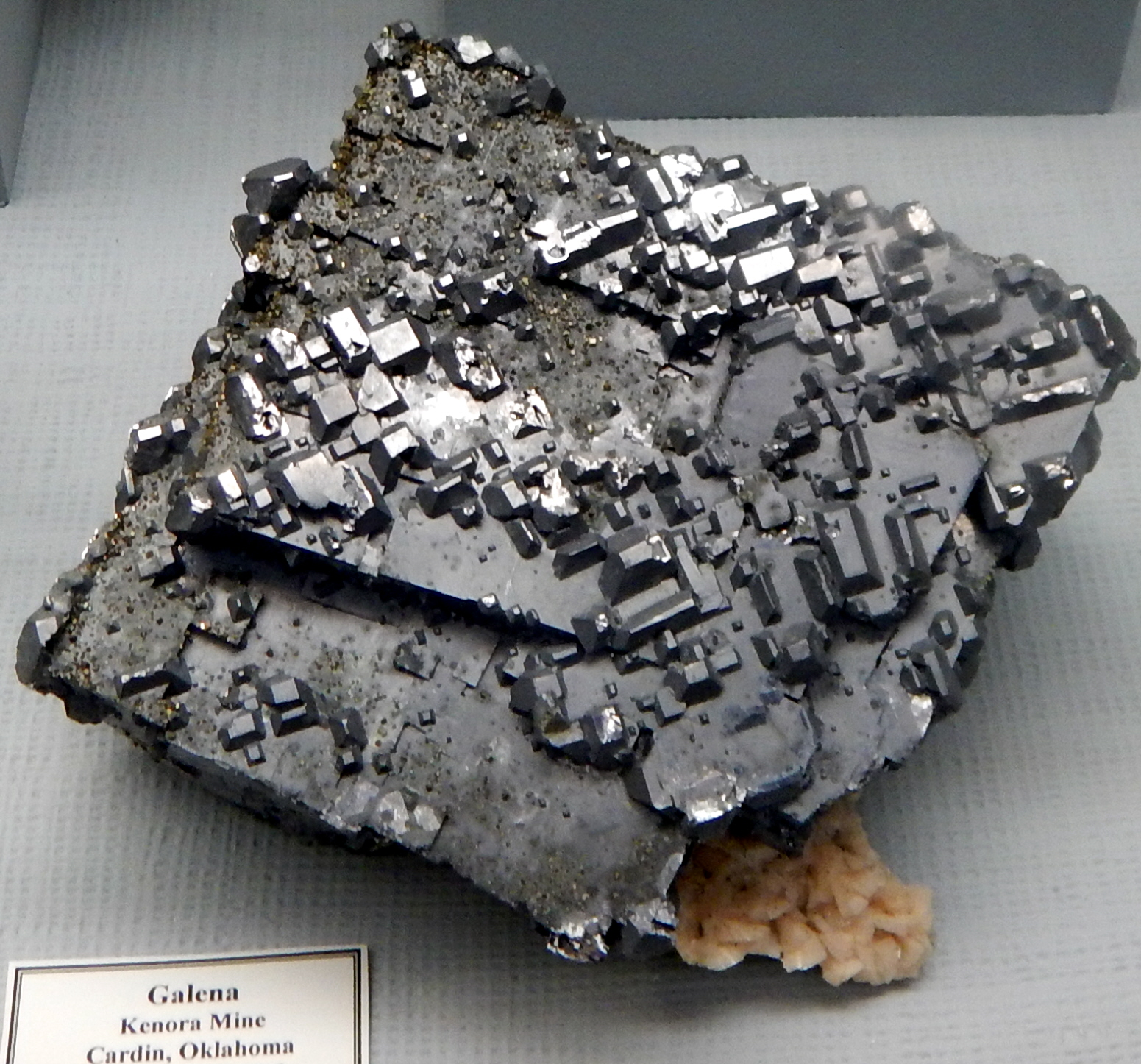
Fine Galena specimen from the old Kenora mine, Cardin

Cardin is a ghost town in Ottawa County, Oklahoma, United States. The population was 150 at the 2000 census, but declined all the way to a population of 3 at the 2010 census in April 2010. By November 2010, the population of the town was listed as zero.

A former center of zinc and lead mining in northeastern Oklahoma, the town is located within the Tar Creek Superfund site designated in 1983 because of extensive environmental contamination. The vast majority of its residents accepted federal buyout offers of their properties, and the town's population officially had declined to zero in November 2010.

== History ==
=== Early history ===
Founded as a mining camp in 1913, the settlement was originally known as Tar Creek, after a stream in the area. In 1918, William Oscar Cardin (Quapaw), and his wife, Isa (Wade) Cardin, had his 40-acre allotment platted and recorded with the county clerk and the town was incorporated under the name Cardin. There were 2,640 residents in 1920, many of them mineworkers. This was part of the Tri-State district of southwest Missouri, southeast Kansas, and northeast Oklahoma, which produced more than 43% of the lead and zinc in the United States in the early 20th century.

In 1938, the town disincorporated, but reincorporated in 1983 as a means to apply for federal grants and loans to construct a sewerage system for the settlement.

=== Buyout and shutdown ===
The town, along with Picher, and Hockerville, Oklahoma, is located within the Tar Creek Superfund site. This was designated in 1983 under laws intended to allocate federal funding to clean up former mining sites of extensive pollution.

These towns are part of a $60 million federal buyout because of lead pollution, as well as the risk of buildings caving in due to decades of underground mining. Cardin, Oklahoma, officially closed its last business, the post office, on February 28, 2009. In April 2009, federal officials stated that only seven residences were occupied in Cardin and that the town's water service would soon be shut off. Cardin was the first city within the Superfund area to be completely closed down. In November 2010, the last family in Cardin received its final buyout payment from the federally funded Lead-Impacted Communities Relocation Assistance Trust. They departed, reducing the town's population to zero.

Similarly, Picher was officially unincorporated in 2013, after reductions in population due to buyouts and to damage from the 2008 tornado. The state and EPA estimate that years more of investment and treatment will be required to reduce contamination to acceptable levels, and restore some of the habitat and landscape.

== Geography ==
Cardin is located at 36°58′32″N 94°51′6″W (36.975692, -94.851612). According to the United States Census Bureau, the town has a total area of 0.1 square miles (0.26 km^{2}), all of it land.

== Demographics ==
At the 2000 census, there were 150 people, 58 households, and 44 families residing in the town. The population density was 1,665.7 inhabitants per square mile (643.1/km^{2}). There were 66 housing units at an average density of 732.9 per square mile (283.0/km^{2}). The racial makeup of the town was 83.33% White, 6.00% Native American, and 10.67% from two or more races.

There were 58 households, of which 29.3% had children under the age of 18 living with them, 60.3% were married couples living together, 13.8% had a female householder with no husband present, and 24.1% were non-families. 20.7% of all households were made up of individuals, and 12.1% had someone living alone who was 65 years of age or older. The average household size was 2.59 and the average family size was 3.00.

22.7% of the population was under the age of 18, 9.3% from 18 to 24, 26.0% from 25 to 44, 21.3% from 45 to 64, and 20.7% were 65 years of age or older. The median age was 38 years. For every 100 females, there were 108.3 males. For every 100 females aged 18 and over, there were 96.6 males.

The median household income was $24,000 and the median family income was $25,417. Males had a median income of $23,125 compared with $13,750 for females. The per capita income for the town was $9,570. There were 22.0% of families and 31.0% of the population living below the poverty line, including 57.1% of those under eighteen and none of those over 64.

== Education ==
The local school district, Picher-Cardin Public Schools, closed in 2009. The territory at that time became a part of Quapaw Public Schools.

== Notable people ==
- Merlyn Mantle, wife of baseball player Mickey Mantle, was a native of Cardin.

== See also ==
- Eagle Picher Mine was the principal lead-zinc producer in the Picher mining district of Oklahoma.
- Tri-State district, was the historic lead-zinc mining district in southwest Missouri, southeast Kansas, and northeast Oklahoma.
