= Commerce Public Schools =

School district in Oklahoma, United States

Commerce High School

Location
- 420 Doug Furnas Boulevard; Commerce, (Ottawa County), Oklahoma 74339; United States
- Coordinates: 36.937671°N 94.867329°W

Information
- Type: Public high school
- Principal: Rusty Barker
- Staff: 17.34 (FTE)
- Enrollment: 244 (2023-24)
- Student to teacher ratio: 14.07
- Colors: Blue and white
- Nickname: Tigers
- Website: Commerce High School

Commerce School Public Schools is a school district headquartered in Commerce, Oklahoma.

The district includes Commerce, North Miami, and a section of Miami.

In 2009 the Picher-Cardin Public Schools closed and was dissolved. A portion went to the Commerce school district.

In 2014 the school district banned vaping. The district superintendent, Jimmy R. Haynes, favored the state of Oklahoma addressing the issue on a statewide level.

== Schools ==
- Commerce High School
- Commerce Middle School
- Alexander Elementary School
