= Picher, Oklahoma =

Ghost town in Oklahoma, United States

- Ghost town
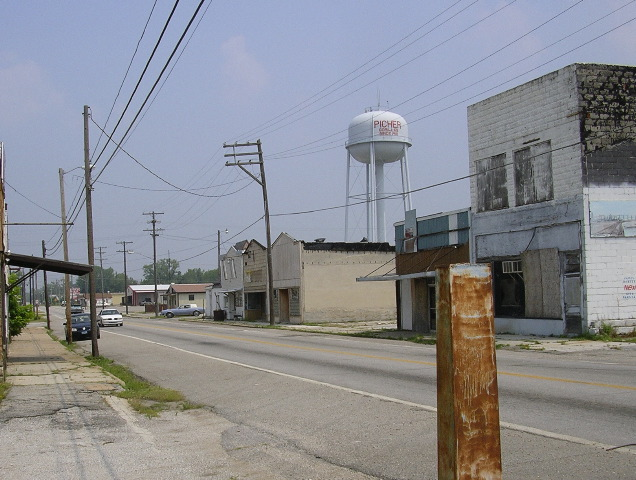
- A view looking north along Connell Ave, which was the main business district, 2007. The Picher Water Tower stands in the background.

- Location within Ottawa County showing former municipal boundaries
- Coordinates: 36°58′58″N 94°49′58″W
- Country: United States
- State: Oklahoma
- County: Ottawa

Area
  - Total: 2.2 sq mi (5.8 km^{2})
  - Land: 2.2 sq mi (5.8 km^{2})
  - Water: 0 sq mi (0.0 km^{2})
- Elevation: 823 ft (251 m)

Population (2010)
  - Total: 20
  - Density: 8.9/sq mi (3.4/km^{2})
- Time zone: UTC-6 (Central (CST))
  - Summer (DST): UTC-5 (CDT)
- ZIP code: 74360
- Area codes: 539/918
- FIPS code: 40-58550
- GNIS feature ID: 1096611

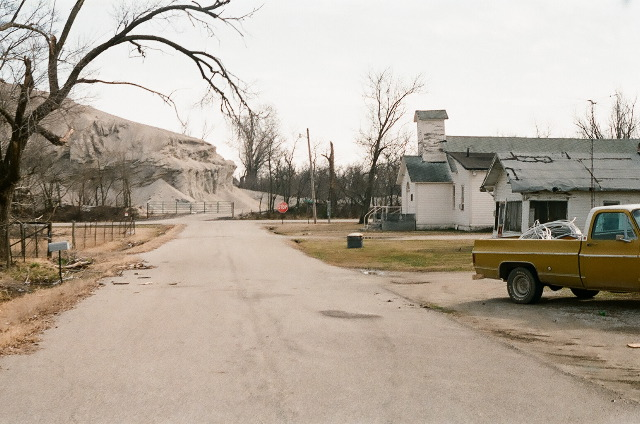
Mining waste near neighborhoods South Treece Street, 2008

Picher is a ghost town and former city in Ottawa County, northeastern Oklahoma, United States. It was a major national center of lead and zinc mining for more than 100 years in the center of the Tri-State Mining District.

Decades of unrestricted subsurface excavation dangerously undermined most of Picher's town buildings and left giant piles of toxic metal-contaminated mine tailings (known as chat) heaped throughout the area. The discovery of cave-in risks, groundwater contamination and health effects associated with the chat piles and subsurface shafts resulted in the site being included in 1983 in the Tar Creek Superfund site by the US Environmental Protection Agency.

The state collaborated on mitigation and remediation measures, but a 1994 study found that 34% of the children in Picher suffered from lead poisoning due to these environmental effects, which could result in lifelong neurological problems. Eventually, the EPA and the state of Oklahoma agreed to a mandatory evacuation and buyout of the entire township.

A 2006 Army Corps of Engineers study showed 86% of Picher's buildings (including the town school) were badly undermined and subject to collapse at any time. The destruction in May 2008 of 150 homes by an EF4 tornado accelerated the exodus of the remaining population.

On September 1, 2009, the state of Oklahoma officially dis-incorporated the city of Picher, which ceased official operations on that day. The population plummeted from 1,640 at the 2000 census to 20 at the 2010 census. The federal government proceeded to conduct buyouts of remaining properties. As of January 2011, six homes and one business remained, their owners having refused to leave at any price. Except for some historic structures, the rest of the town's buildings were scheduled to be demolished by the end of the year. One of the last vacant buildings, which had housed the former Picher mining museum, was destroyed by arson in April 2015. Its historical archives and artifacts had already been shipped to the Dobson Museum in Miami, Oklahoma, by that point.

Picher is among a small number of locations in the world (such as Gilman, Colorado; Centralia, Pennsylvania; and Wittenoom, Western Australia) to be evacuated and declared uninhabitable due to environmental and health damage caused by mining.

The closest towns to Picher, other than nearby fellow ghost towns Cardin, Treece and Douthat, are Commerce, Quapaw (the headquarters of the federally recognized Native American nation by that name), and Miami, Oklahoma.

== History ==
=== Mining origins ===
In 1913, as the Tri-State district expanded, lead and zinc were discovered on Harry Crawfish's claim, and mining began. A townsite developed overnight around the new workings and was named Picher in honor of O. S. Picher, owner of Picher Lead Company. The city was incorporated in 1918, and by 1920, Picher had a population of 9,726. Peak population occurred in 1926 with 14,252 residents.

The Picher area became the most productive lead-zinc mining field in the Tri-State district, producing over $20 billion worth of ore between 1917 and 1947. More than fifty percent of the lead and zinc used during World War I was extracted from the Picher district. At its peak more than 14,000 miners worked the mines and another 4,000 worked in mining services. Many workers commuted by an extensive interurban trolley system from as far away as Joplin and Carthage, Missouri.

=== Decline and pollution problems ===
The population entered a steady decline after the peak in 1926 due to the decrease in mining activity, leaving Picher with only 2,553 by 1960.

In early 1950, an article in Variety Magazine read:

A new one was added to the books on theatre closings when the Plaza theatre, Picher, Okla., shuttered last week after a warning of a possible earth cave-in. The theatre is the only business in four threatened blocks which has stopped doing business as usual. The Eagle-Picher Mining & Smelting Co., chief industrial concern of the town and the nearby area, warned that supporting pillars in abandoned mine tunnels under four business blocks of the town are showing definite signs of strain. Lawrence Wells, manager of the Plaza, said he had no choice but to close the 1,000-seater until the vicinity was pronounced safe.

Mining ceased in 1967 and water pumping from the mines ceased. The contaminated water from 14,000 abandoned mine shafts, 70 million tons of mine tailings, and 36 million tons of mill sand and sludge remained as a huge environmental cleanup problem. As a result of national legislation to identify and remediate such environmentally hazardous sites, in 1983 the area was designated as part of the Tar Creek Superfund site, along with the similarly contaminated satellite towns of Treece, Kansas, and Cardin, Oklahoma.

In 1994, Indian Health Service test results concerning the blood lead levels of Indian children living on the Site indicated that approximately 35 percent of the children tested had concentrations of lead in their blood exceeding 10 micrograms per deciliter, the level of lead in the blood the Centers for Disease Control considers to be a health concern. In August 1994, to address the threat of lead exposure to children, EPA began sampling soils at high-access areas, such as day cares, schoolyards, and other areas where children congregate. The sampling detected significant concentrations of lead, cadmium, and other heavy metals in surface soils. Eventually, the EPA and the state of Oklahoma agreed to a mandatory evacuation and buyout of the entire township.

While some remediation took place in the following quarter century, contamination and other environmental hazards were found to be so severe that the government decided to close Picher and relocate its residents, as reported on April 24, 2006, by Reuters. Due in large part to the removal of large amounts of subsurface material during mining operations, many of the city's structures have been deemed in imminent danger of caving in.

=== Tornado ===
On May 10, 2008, Picher was struck by an EF4 tornado. There were six confirmed deaths, possibly including one child, and many other people injured. The tornado first touched down near the Kansas–Oklahoma state line in Oklahoma southwest of Chetopa, Kansas, and tracked eastward. It struck Picher, causing extensive damage to 20 blocks of the city, with houses and businesses destroyed or flattened. At least 150 people were injured in Picher alone. The tornado continued eastward, passing just north of Quapaw and Peoria before crossing Interstate 44 into Missouri. Oklahoma Governor Brad Henry sent National Guard troops as well as emergency personnel to assist the hardest hit area in Picher. Loss of power from the tornado forced the city to go on a boiled water notice. Staff from the Oklahoma Rural Water Association arrived to assist, since the utility's testing equipment was destroyed by the storm. With an emergency generator to supply power, rural water staff had the system running normally only two days after the tornado struck.

Given the existing plan to vacate the city, the federal government decided against aid to rebuild homes, and the buyouts continued as previously scheduled, with people being assisted in relocation.

=== Closure ===
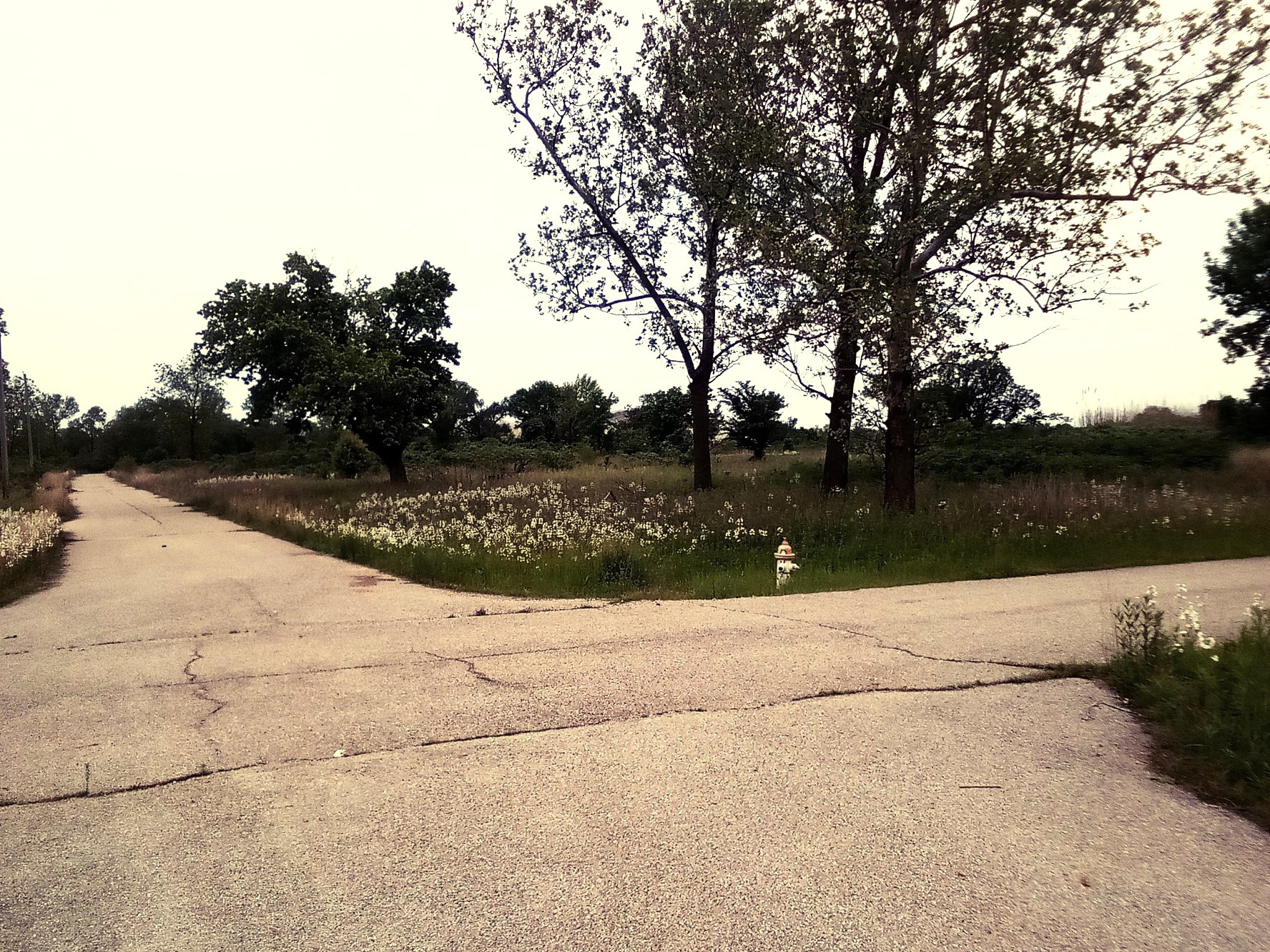
A former residential neighborhood with no homes standing

The city's post office was scheduled to close in July 2009, and the city ceased operations as a municipality on September 1, 2009. By June 29, 2009, all of the residents had been given federal checks to enable them to relocate from Picher permanently. The city is considered to be too toxic to be habitable. On the last day, all the final residents met at the school auditorium to say goodbye. As of November 2010, it was reported that Picher still had "one business and six occupied houses."

Starting in January 2011, almost all remaining commercial structures were scheduled to be demolished. Gary Linderman, owner of the Ole Miners Pharmacy, said he would stay until the last resident left. He died in 2015.

The municipality of Picher was officially dissolved on November 26, 2013. By March 2014, standing abandoned buildings included the Picher-Cardin High School building, a Christian church, the mining museum, and a handful of mercantile buildings, as well as numerous abandoned houses.

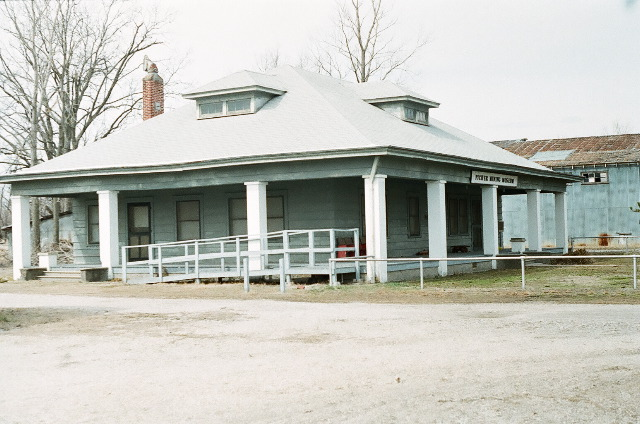
The former Tri State Zinc and Lead Ore Producers Association Office was on the National Register of Historic Places, 2008. The building was destroyed by arson in April 2015.

The Picher Mining Field Museum, which had been housed in the former Tri-State Zinc and Lead Ore Producers Association building, was destroyed by arson in April 2015. The museum archives had previously been sent to Pittsburg State University, and other artifacts had been sent to the Baxter Springs, Kansas Heritage Center and Museum. In March 2017 the often-photographed Christian church, which was originally a one-room schoolhouse, was also destroyed by fire.

Gary Linderman, owner of the Ole Miners Pharmacy, was featured in the May 28, 2007, issue of People magazine in the Heroes Among Us article: "Prescription for Kindness". He vowed to stay as long as there was anyone left who needed him and to be the last one out of the city. He died on June 9, 2015, at the age of 60 from a sudden illness.

Meanwhile, the cleanup continues. On September 17, 2019, the EPA, in cooperation with the state of Oklahoma and the Quapaw Nation, released the Final Tar Creek Strategic Plan to advance the cleanup of the Tar Creek Superfund site. The EPA indicated while great progress had been made, much work was yet to be done, and the Plan was a commitment to accelerate the cleanup.

Since 2015, former residents have held Christmas parades in Picher.

== Geography ==
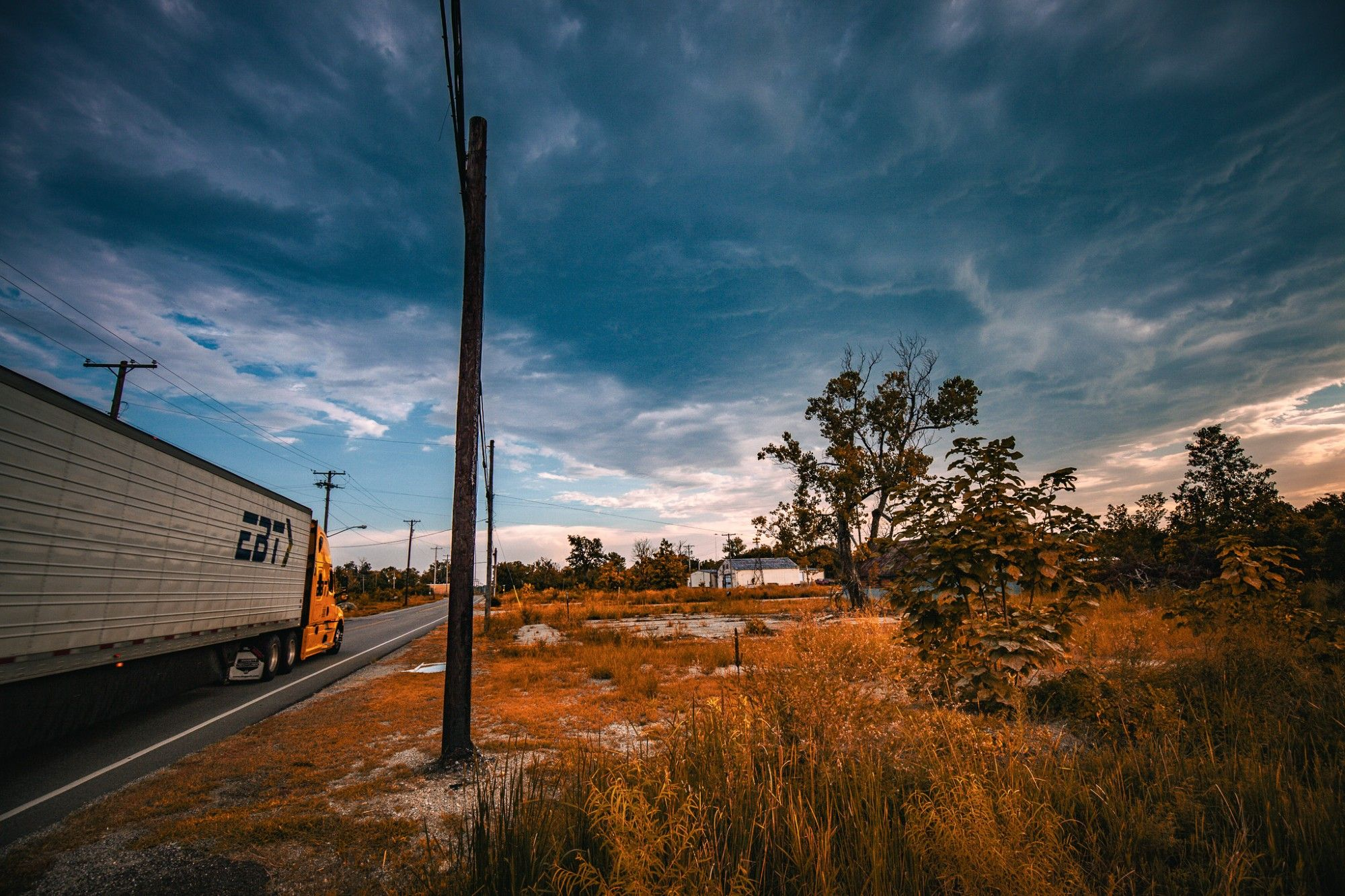
US 69 at East 1st St looking south, August 2023.

Picher is 8 miles (13 km) north of Miami, the county seat. According to the United States Census Bureau, the city had a total area of 2.2 square miles (5.7 km^{2}), all of it land.

== Demographics ==
Historical population
Census	Pop.	Note	%±
1920	9,676		—
1930	7,773		−19.7%
1940	5,848		−24.8%
1950	3,951		−32.4%
1960	2,553		−35.4%
1970	2,363		−7.4%
1980	2,180		−7.7%
1990	1,714		−21.4%
2000	1,640		−4.3%
2010	20		−98.8%
2019 (est.)	0		−100.0%
U.S. Decennial Census

=== 2000 census ===
As of the census of 2000, there were 1,640 people, 621 households, and 417 families residing in the city. The population density was 734.0 inhabitants per square mile (283.4/km^{2}). There were 708 housing units at an average density of 316.9 per square mile (122.4/km^{2}). The racial makeup of the city was 77.13% White, 13.78% Native American, 0.18% Pacific Islander, 0.12% Asian, 0.06% from other races, and 8.72% from two or more races. Hispanic or Latino of any race were 1.40% of the population.

There were 621 households, out of which 30.9% had children under the age of 18 living with them, 50.6% were married couples living together, 12.4% had a female householder with no husband present, and 32.7% were non-families. 29.1% of all households were made up of individuals, and 14.0% had someone living alone who was 65 years of age or older. The average household size was 2.58 and the average family size was 3.20.

In the city the population was spread out, with 27.1% under the age of 18, 9.1% from 18 to 24, 24.0% from 25 to 44, 23.5% from 45 to 64, and 16.2% who were 65 years of age or older. The median age was 37 years. For every 100 females, there were 95.2 males. For every 100 females age 18 and over, there were 90.0 males.

The median income for a household in the city was $19,722, and the median income for a family was $25,950. Males had a median income of $22,321 versus $15,947 for females. The per capita income for the city was $10,938. About 21.1% of families and 25.4% of the population were below the poverty line, including 27.4% of those under age 18 and 30.9% of those age 65 or over.

== Education ==
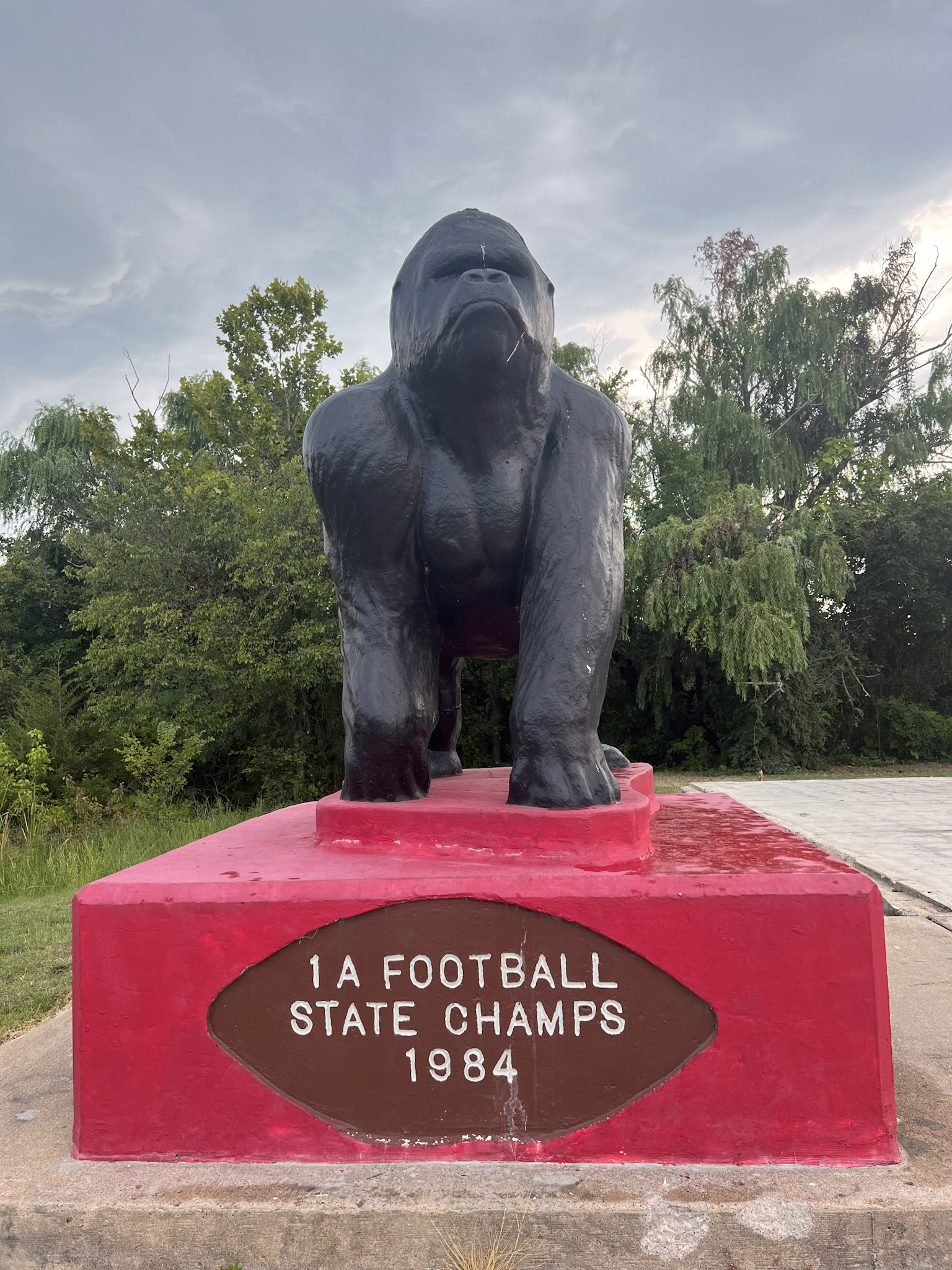
Statue of Picher Gorillas mascot. The gorilla statue is now part of the official Picher-Cardin Memorial.

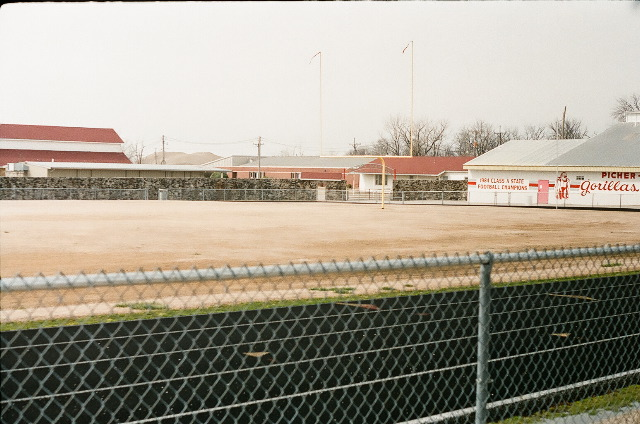
Picher-Cardin High School stadium, 2008

The city was served by the Picher-Cardin Public Schools, which closed in 2009. At that time the municipality was placed in the Quapaw Public Schools. In April 2009, residents voted 55–6 to dissolve the Picher-Cardin school district; it graduated its final class of 11 in May. By 2009 the district's enrollment had dropped to a total of 49 students from approximately 343 students years prior. Remaining students were assigned to attend Commerce and Quapaw school districts.

=== 1984 Oklahoma Class A champions ===
In 1984, the local high school football team, the Gorillas, won the Oklahoma Class A Championship. A statue of a Gorilla was dedicated as the Picher-Cardin Memorial, Home of the Gorillas.

== Representation in media ==
Picher was featured in the PBS Independent Lens film The Creek Runs Red, which discussed the connection of the people and their desire to leave or stay in the city. Picher was also featured in the Jump the Fence Productions film titled Tar Creek (2009). The film was written, directed, and narrated by Matt Myers.

Picher was featured in an episode of Life After People: The Series on the History Channel. The aforementioned tornado was also featured on an episode of the Weather Channel's Storm Stories.

Picher was also featured in the premiere episode of Forgotten Planet: Abandoned America on the Discovery Channel (along with Pripyat, Ukraine) in a story of two cities abandoned due to industrial disasters.

In April 2015, Picher was featured in a segment on the National Geographic Channel called "The Watch", in which one of a handful of holdouts still resides and watches over what is left of the town.

Police investigating the Welch, Oklahoma murders of Danny and Kathy Freeman and the murders of Lauria Bible and Ashley Freeman filed charges including statements from numerous witnesses and alleged accomplices who stated they had heard rumors that Lauria Bible and Ashley Freeman were in a pit or mineshaft in Picher, or had been threatened by Warren Philip Welch, lead suspect in the crimes, who told them they would "end up in a pit in Picher like those two girls." Their bodies have never been found, though suspected accomplice Ronnie Dean Busick was arrested in April 2018 for his involvement in the crimes. Busick pleaded guilty July 15, 2020 to being an accessory to first-degree murder in the deaths of Danny and Kathy Freeman, the torching of their home near Welch, Oklahoma, and the abduction and presumed slayings of the two girls. He admitted having withheld information about the involvement of Warren "Phil" Welch and David Pennington, both of whom have since died without ever having been charged. He was sentenced to 15 years for the crime, with 10 of the years to be spent in lockup.

The Oklahoma City sludge metal band Chat Pile takes its name from the chat piles in the city.

There is a musical in the process of being created based on the real story of the town. Titled The Picher Project, the story combines real life people, such as Tar Creek waterkeeper Rebecca Jim and Picher-native, and previous Mayor Orvile "Hoppy" Ray, with fictional characters based on actual people in order to properly tell the story of the town and the people who lived there, as well as the Quapaw nation. The show was conceptualized and is being created by Quentin Madia, Lauren Pelaia, and Alex Knezevic, with Knezevic eventually leaving the production on good terms to pursue independent ventures. Prior to the formal creation and writing of the script and music, the production team visited the town of Picher and were toured around by Rebecca Jim. They also interviewed several former citizens of the town, such as Orville Ray's son. The musical has had workshop performances at Dixon Place, BarnArts, and 54 Below, as well as a virtual performance of a of couple songs using the non-profit theatre company The Dare Tactic to promote the songs and gain feedback on the show. On April 30, 2023, Media and Pelaia directed a workshop of the show at The College of New Jersey with members of the college's musical theatre organization performing the most recent version of the script for an invite-only audience. Beginning on September 28, 2023, and ending the following month on October 21 the production saw its first full residency, returning to Dixon Place. The Picher Project has been featured in multiple news articles, including two from The Joplin Globe, KOAM-TV, Four States News, E & E News, and BroadwayWorld.

== Notable people ==
- Joe Don Rooney – American guitarist (born 1975)

== See also ==
- ASARCO – American materials company
- National Register of Historic Places listings in Ottawa County, Oklahoma
- Treece, Kansas – Ghost town in Cherokee County, Kansas
