= Douthat, Oklahoma =

Ghost town in Oklahoma, US

- Ghost town
- Location within Oklahoma
- Coordinates: 36°57′33″N 94°50′10″W
- Country: United States
- State: Oklahoma
- County: Ottawa
- Elevation: 814 ft (248 m)
- GNIS feature ID: 1100283

Douthat is a ghost town in Ottawa County, Oklahoma, United States. Douthat is 2 miles (3.2 km) south of Picher. Douthat once had a post office, which opened on March 17, 1917. The community was named after Zahn A. Douthat, the owner of the townsite. Douthat is now abandoned and part of the Tar Creek Superfund site.

Douthat constituted the west part of a larger mining camp known as Century, Oklahoma. A newspaper, The Independent, also called the Douthat Independent, referred to the town in its first issue published July 5, 1917 as "Douthat (Century)", and indicated the place was the "center of the Quapaw Miami mining district—the greatest lead and zinc mining country in the world excepting none". The paper used both names going forward, stating in an advertisement in the second edition that the business in question was opposite the O.K.& M. train station in Douthat, but editorializing in the third edition that in regard to needed but uninstalled railroad crossings, "Century is full of promises from the O. K. & M. You see they have not put in road crossings".

As referenced, the Oklahoma, Kansas and Missouri Inter-Urban Railway Company (O.K.& M.) had built into Douthat/Century from Commerce in 1916. That line later became part of the Northeast Oklahoma Railroad in 1919. The line was absorbed into the St. Louis and San Francisco Railway (Frisco) in 1967, but was subsequently abandoned.
