= Peoria, Oklahoma =

- Town
- Location within Ottawa County and the state of Oklahoma
- Coordinates: 36°54′56″N 94°40′10″W
- Country: United States
- State: Oklahoma
- County: Ottawa

Area
  - Total: 0.24 sq mi (0.63 km^{2})
  - Land: 0.24 sq mi (0.63 km^{2})
  - Water: 0 sq mi (0.00 km^{2})
- Elevation: 879 ft (268 m)

Population (2020)
  - Total: 126
  - Density: 519.1/sq mi (200.43/km^{2})
- Time zone: UTC-6 (Central (CST))
  - Summer (DST): UTC-5 (CDT)
- ZIP code: 74363
- Area codes: 539/918
- FIPS code: 40-58100
- GNIS feature ID: 2413126

Peoria is a town in Ottawa County, Oklahoma, United States. It was named for the Peoria people, a tribe of Native Americans who were removed to Indian Territory from east of the Mississippi River during the 19th century. (Note: The Peoria, Kaskaskia, Piankashaw, and Wea formed the Confederated Peoria Tribe, which in 1867 bought land from the Quapaw between the Neosho River and the Arkansas border.) The territory had been occupied by the Quapaw people, who sold some of their land to the Peoria. As of the 2020 census, Peoria had a population of 126. The long decline of mining meant that jobs moved elsewhere.

== History ==
The area of northeastern Oklahoma around Peoria has long been associated with mineral extraction. The Native Americans had operated a chert quarry here well before the area was visited by Europeans. This was part of the territory of the Quapaw people, and later the Peoria and related remnant tribes.

Peoria began developing in 1891 as a mining camp for the Tri-State District, made up of parts of southwest Missouri, southeast Kansas, and northeast Indian Territory, now Oklahoma. A post office was opened in 1891 and named to honor the Peoria tribe. These lead and zinc mines were most productive between 1891 and 1896. In 1897, ore production began moving farther north in Ottawa County. In 1894 William Holmes conducted the first professional archaeological study in the future state at this site. Peoria incorporated in 1898.

Peoria's population declined as mining moved out of the area. A few mines continued small-scale production until the mid 1940s. The post office closed in 1941. The Peoria school district consolidated with that of Quapaw in 1970.

== Geography ==
The town is about 14.8 driving miles east-northeast of Miami, Oklahoma in the far northeastern corner of the state. It is 3.1 driving miles west of the Missouri border and 7.6 driving miles south of the Kansas border.

According to the United States Census Bureau, the town has a total area of 0.2 square miles (0.52 km^{2}), all land.

== Demographics ==
Historical population
Census	Pop.	Note	%±
1900	144		—
1910	135		−6.2%
1920	166		23.0%
1930	189		13.9%
1940	227		20.1%
1950	201		−11.5%
1960	156		−22.4%
1970	179		14.7%
1980	165		−7.8%
1990	136		−17.6%
2000	141		3.7%
2010	132		−6.4%
2020	126		−4.5%
U.S. Decennial Census

Peoria is part of the Joplin, Missouri metropolitan area.

=== 2020 census ===
As of the 2020 census, Peoria had a population of 126. The median age was 40.2 years. 31.0% of residents were under the age of 18 and 14.3% of residents were 65 years of age or older. For every 100 females there were 100.0 males, and for every 100 females age 18 and over there were 107.1 males age 18 and over.

0.0% of residents lived in urban areas, while 100.0% lived in rural areas.

There were 49 households in Peoria, of which 36.7% had children under the age of 18 living in them. Of all households, 38.8% were married-couple households, 22.4% were households with a male householder and no spouse or partner present, and 28.6% were households with a female householder and no spouse or partner present. About 28.5% of all households were made up of individuals and 14.3% had someone living alone who was 65 years of age or older.

There were 50 housing units, of which 2.0% were vacant. The homeowner vacancy rate was 2.4% and the rental vacancy rate was 0.0%.

Racial composition as of the 2020 census
Race	Number	Percent
White	84	66.7%
Black or African American	0	0.0%
American Indian and Alaska Native	34	27.0%
Asian	0	0.0%
Native Hawaiian and Other Pacific Islander	0	0.0%
Some other race	0	0.0%
Two or more races	8	6.3%
Hispanic or Latino (of any race)	4	3.2%

=== 2000 census ===
As of the census of 2000, there were 141 people, 54 households, and 40 families residing in the town. The population density was 582.0 inhabitants per square mile (224.7/km^{2}). There were 59 housing units at an average density of 243.5 per square mile (94.0/km^{2}). The racial makeup of the town was 65.96% White, 24.11% Native American, 0.71% Pacific Islander, and 9.22% from two or more races.

There were 54 households, out of which 38.9% had children under the age of 18 living with them, 59.3% were married couples living together, 16.7% had a female householder with no husband present, and 24.1% were non-families. 20.4% of all households were made up of individuals, and 11.1% had someone living alone who was 65 years of age or older. The average household size was 2.61 and the average family size was 3.05.

In the town, the population was spread out, with 29.1% under the age of 18, 7.1% from 18 to 24, 26.2% from 25 to 44, 19.9% from 45 to 64, and 17.7% who were 65 years of age or older. The median age was 38 years. For every 100 females, there were 95.8 males. For every 100 females age 18 and over, there were 104.1 males.

The median income for a household in the town was $28,125, and the median income for a family was $40,938. Males had a median income of $25,000 versus $21,250 for females. The per capita income for the town was $13,953. There were none of the families and 3.6% of the population living below the poverty line, including no under eighteens and 17.6% of those over 64.

== Education ==
It is a part of Quapaw Public Schools.
