= Tri-State district =

Historic U.S. lead-zinc mines

Coordinates: 37°00′N 94°30′W

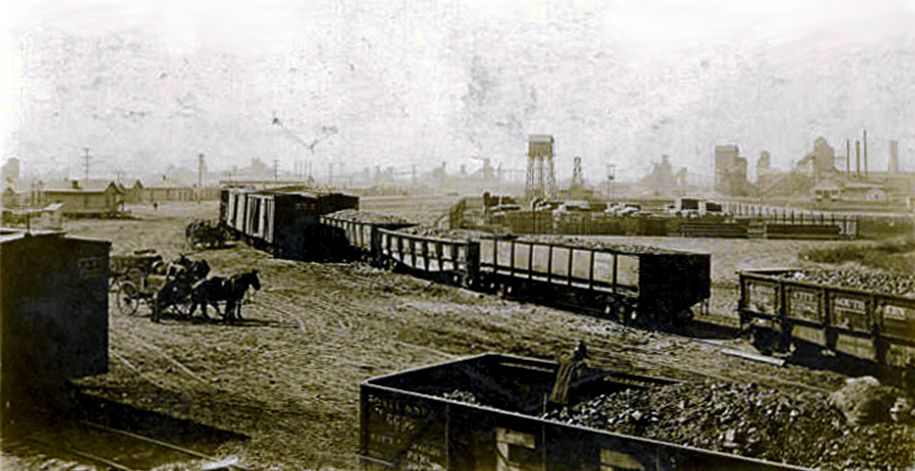
View of mines, plant, rail yard in Cardin, Oklahoma (1922)

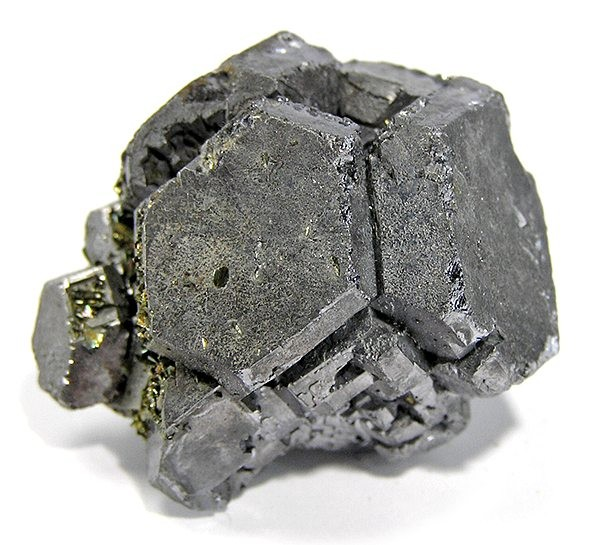
An unusual cluster of galena crystals from the Tri-State district. The gold-colored mineral is chalcopyrite. Size: 3.9 x 3.4 x 2.5 cm.

The Tri-State district was a historic lead-zinc mining district located in present-day southwest Missouri, southeast Kansas and northeast Oklahoma. The district produced lead and zinc for over 100 years. Production began in the 1850s and 1860s in the Joplin - Granby area of Jasper and Newton counties of southwest Missouri. Production was particularly high during the World War I era and continued after World War II, but with declining activity. As jobs left the area, the communities declined in population.

The Picher, Oklahoma mines were finally closed in 1967, and the "Swalley" mine near Baxter Springs, Kansas in 1970. Because of extensive toxic environmental wastes produced from these lead and zinc deposits, known as chat, large areas have been rendered uninhabitable and damage has been caused to air, land and water quality. In some areas, such as Picher, Oklahoma, the federal government bought out the last inhabitants and the town was disincorporated in 2013.

Three large sites in this district have been classified by the Environmental Protection Agency as mining-related Superfund sites: the Tar Creek Superfund site in northeast Oklahoma; the Jasper County and Newton County sites in southwest Missouri; and the Cherokee County site in southeast Kansas. In 2019 EPA announced a plan for continued funding of $16 million annually for cleanup at Tar Creek.

== See also ==
- List of Superfund sites in the United States
