= List of ghost towns in Oklahoma =

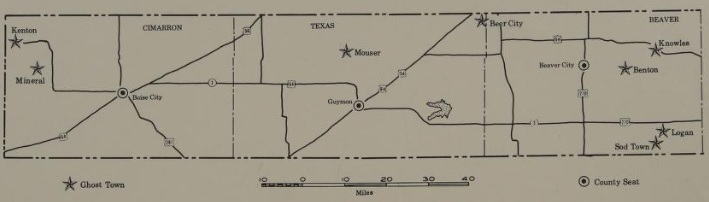
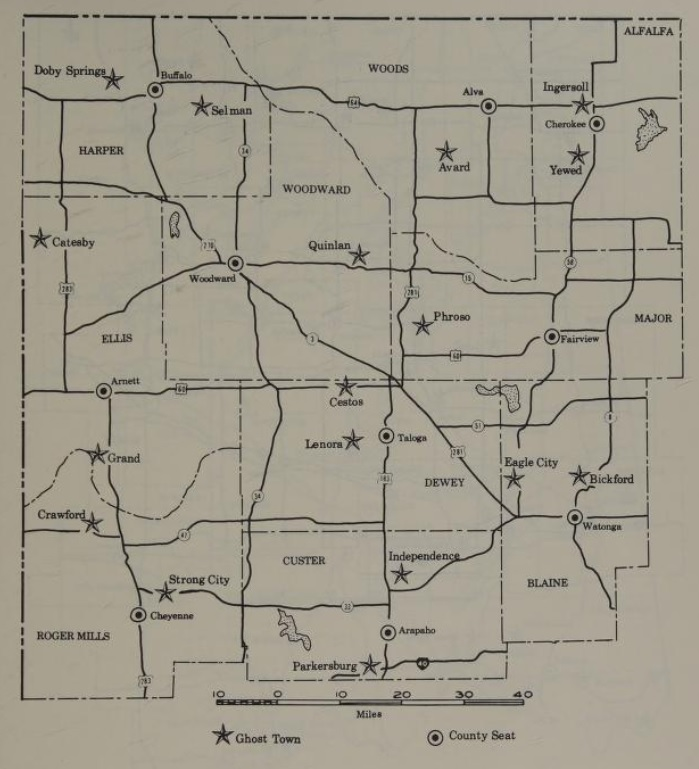
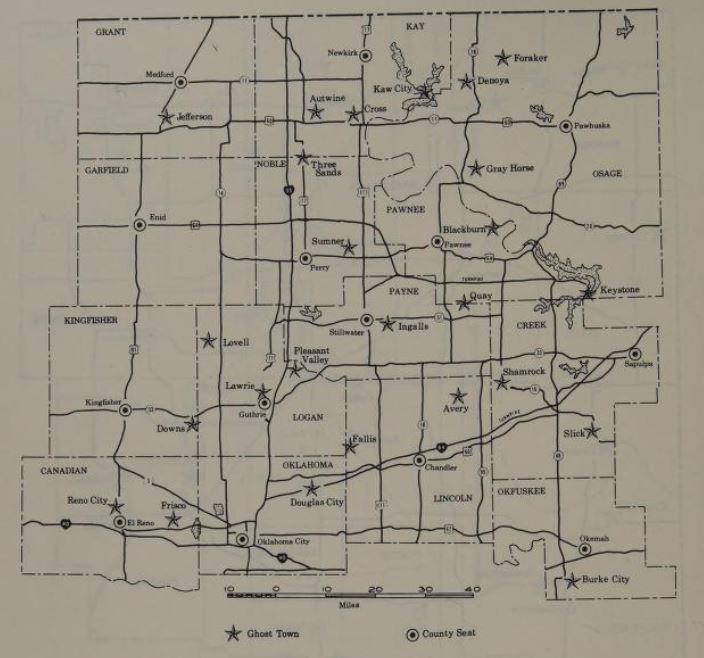
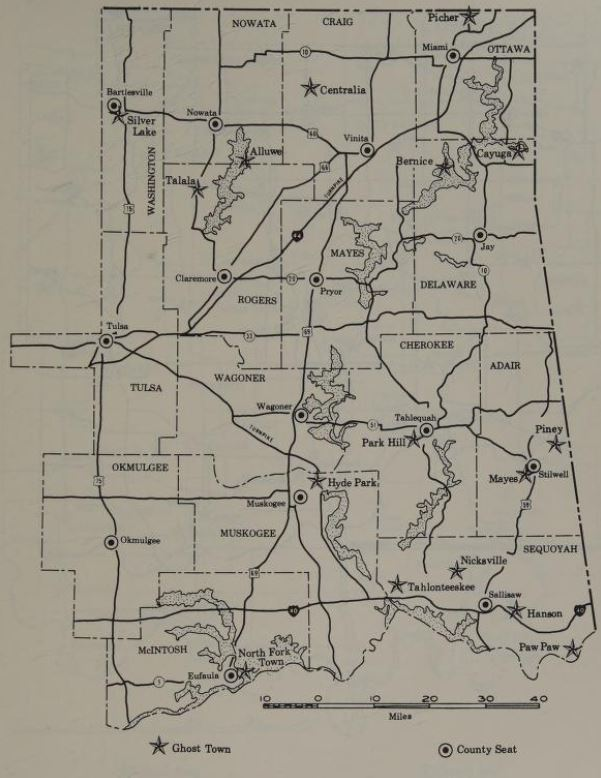
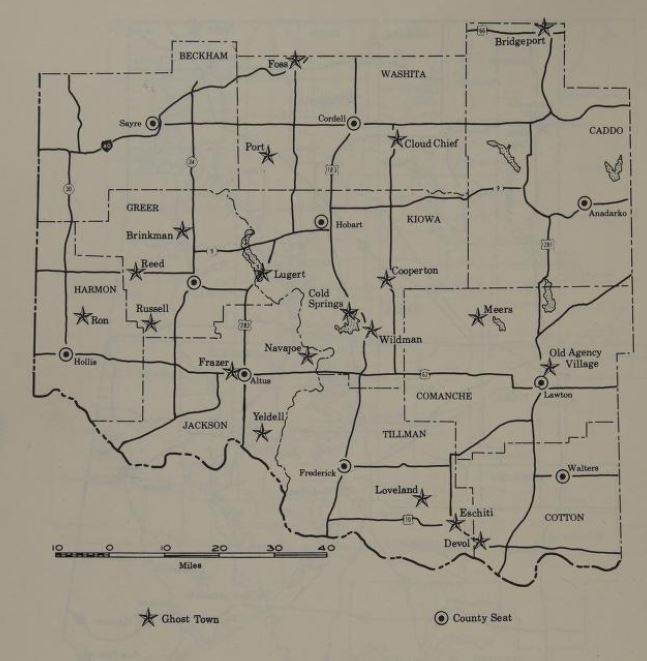
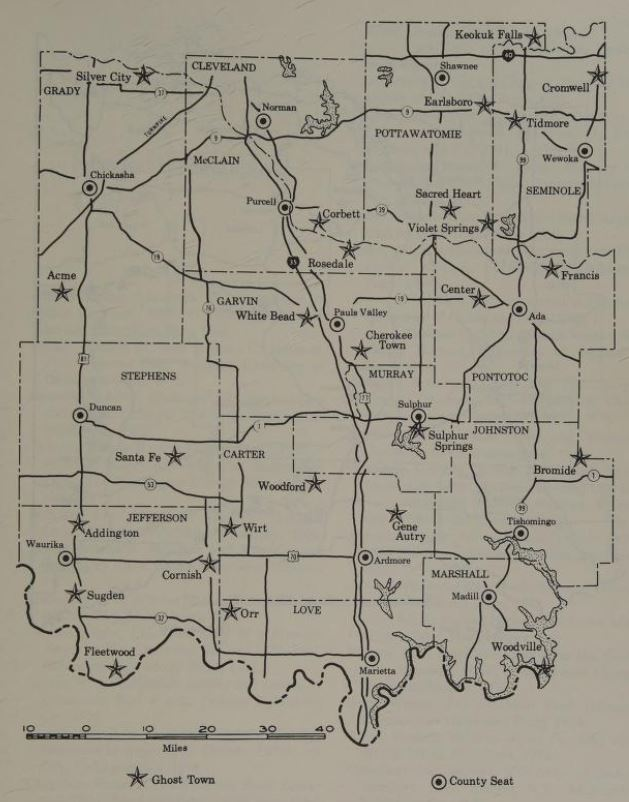
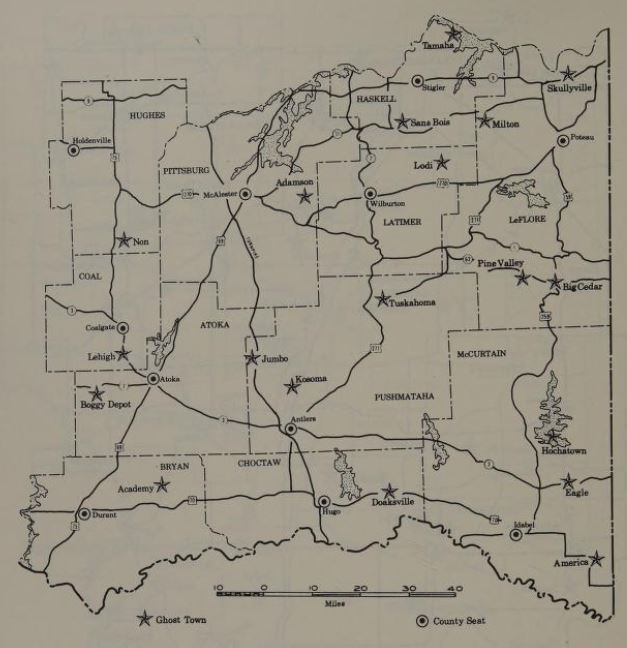
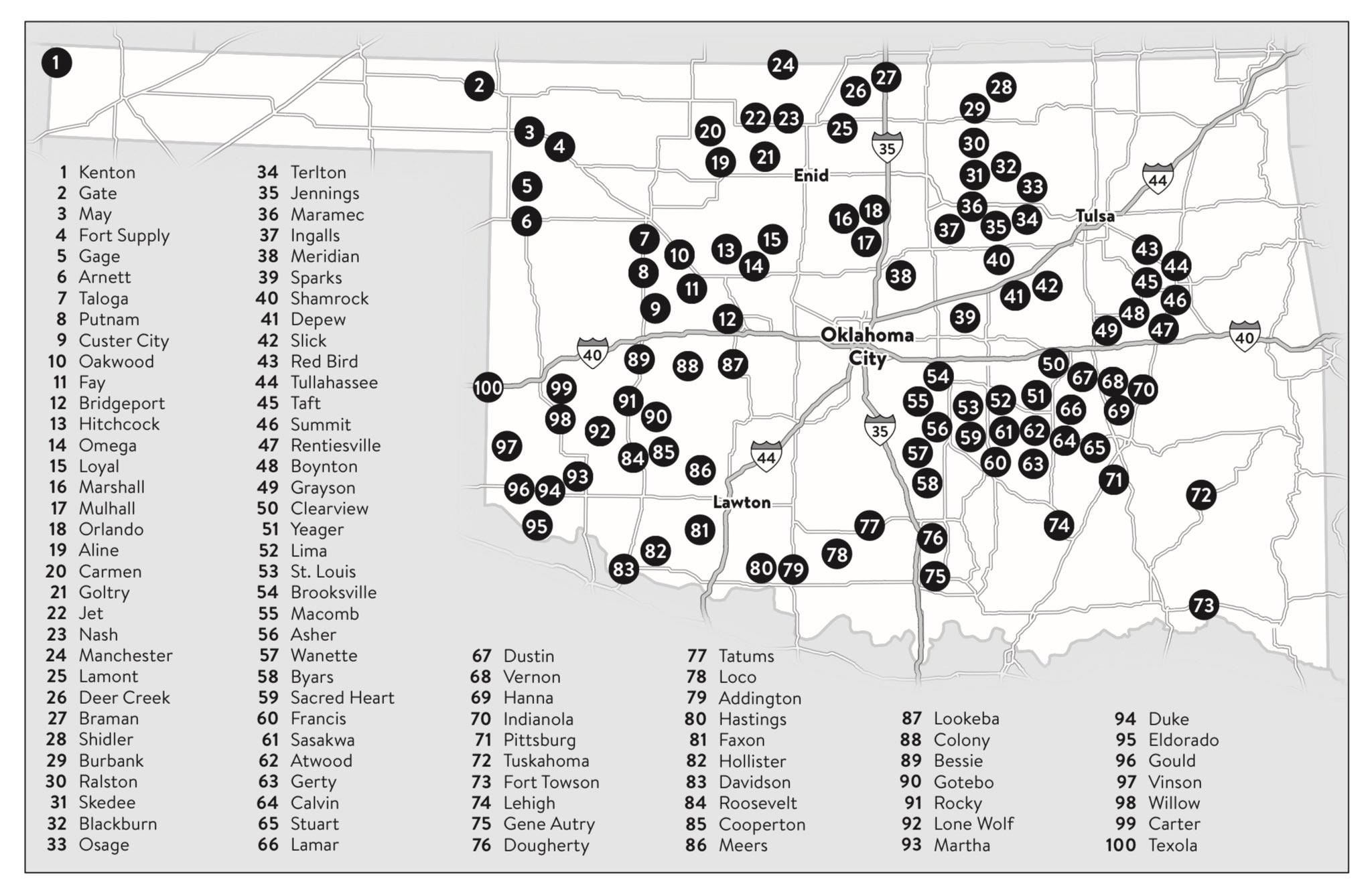
Collection of maps from the ghost towns documented in Ghost Towns of Oklahoma (first seven images) and Here Today (final image)

The U.S. state of Oklahoma has an estimated two thousand ghost towns. These towns began for a number of reasons, often as liquor towns, boomtowns, or mining towns, with some pre-dating statehood. The population and activity later declined in these locations due to the exhaustion of natural resources, manmade or natural disasters, urbanization, the creation of a water source, or after being bypassed by highways and interstates.

These places vary in their current states with some having completely disappeared while others still have small communities. A small number have also gained notability for other reasons, such as being part of the Tar Creek Superfund site, for existing in an unusual location, or for crimes. The earliest known ghost town in the state was said to have been one by 1839 while the latest were evacuated in 2010.

== History ==
Oklahoma is a U.S. state in the South Central region of the United States. It has the nation's twenty-eighth largest population and ranks twentieth in terms of land area in the United States. There are an estimated two thousand ghost towns within the state. Many of these sites emerged quickly for various reasons. Prior to statehood, these were often "liquor towns" (or "whiskey towns"), located in Oklahoma Territory which served alcohol to adjacent residents of Indian Territory, a then-dry territory. Similarly, towns in the Oklahoma panhandle (then called "No Man's Land") were a place for lawlessness where alcohol was also served to residents of the surrounding towns in Kansas and Texas where it was otherwise prohibited. In later years, after Oklahoma was admitted to the union, several boomtowns were established after the discovery of natural resources, such as oil or petroleum jelly. Several mining towns also took form when lead, zinc, gold, or coal was discovered.

Over time, these towns ceased to exist for a variety of reasons. Some towns diminished as the natural resources were exhausted and the population moved to other locations. The residents in other places frequently relocated to be closer to newly-laid railroad tracks, a post office, a water source, or larger cities. Some towns were abandoned when the townspeople were displaced after manmade and natural disasters such as tornadoes, fires (both wild and arson), floods, sinkholes, or being declared a superfund site. A number of places were also demolished to create artificial lakes and dams. In later years, many towns faded away when they were bypassed by the U.S. Numbered Highway System, and later the Interstate Highway System.

Ghost towns in Oklahoma have been extensively researched and documented in two books, both released by the University of Oklahoma Press: Ghost Towns of Oklahoma (1978) by John W. Morris and Here Today: Oklahoma's Ghost Towns, Vanishing Towns, and Towns Persisting Against the Odds (2024) by Jeffrey B. Schmidt. The definition of "ghost town" varies from author to author. Morris, for example, classified them as such if they met one of three criteria: places that no longer exist and have no physical evidence remaining, places in which structures remain but have been abandoned and are unused, or places where the population has decreased eighty percent or more from its peak.

Schmidt, meanwhile, had a lower threshold for population decline and placed listed towns into one of five specific categories—Barren Site, Neglected Site, Abandoned Site, Semi-Abandoned Site, or Historic Community—which are used as a methodology to describe the locations' then-statuses. While still covering historic communities in his book, Schmidt did not consider them to meet the criteria of a ghost town. Further definitions of what a ghost town is have been shaped by various other authors whose scope often extends outside of Oklahoma itself.

Oklahoma's ghost towns are in various states of existence. The locations of Autwine and Zincville, among others, have very little to no physical evidence remaining, such as ruins or foundations, and have been reverted for agricultural use. Other locations are similar to those of Gotebo and Warwick and may still have abandoned buildings or even a community that contains businesses, schools, or a local government, and in which citizens reside.

A few ghost towns have also become particularly notable in their own right for other reasons. For example, Picher has been referred to as the most toxic town in America, (Note: Attributed to multiple references:) while residents in Texola were classified as both Oklahomans and Texans because the town was surveyed eight different times, often with different results about whether the area actually existed in Oklahoma or Texas. Kenton is known for being the only place in Oklahoma to observe Mountain Time and Shamrock rose to notoriety after it was discovered that local law enforcement were issuing illegal traffic tickets because they were not actually police officers to begin with.

== List of ghost towns ==
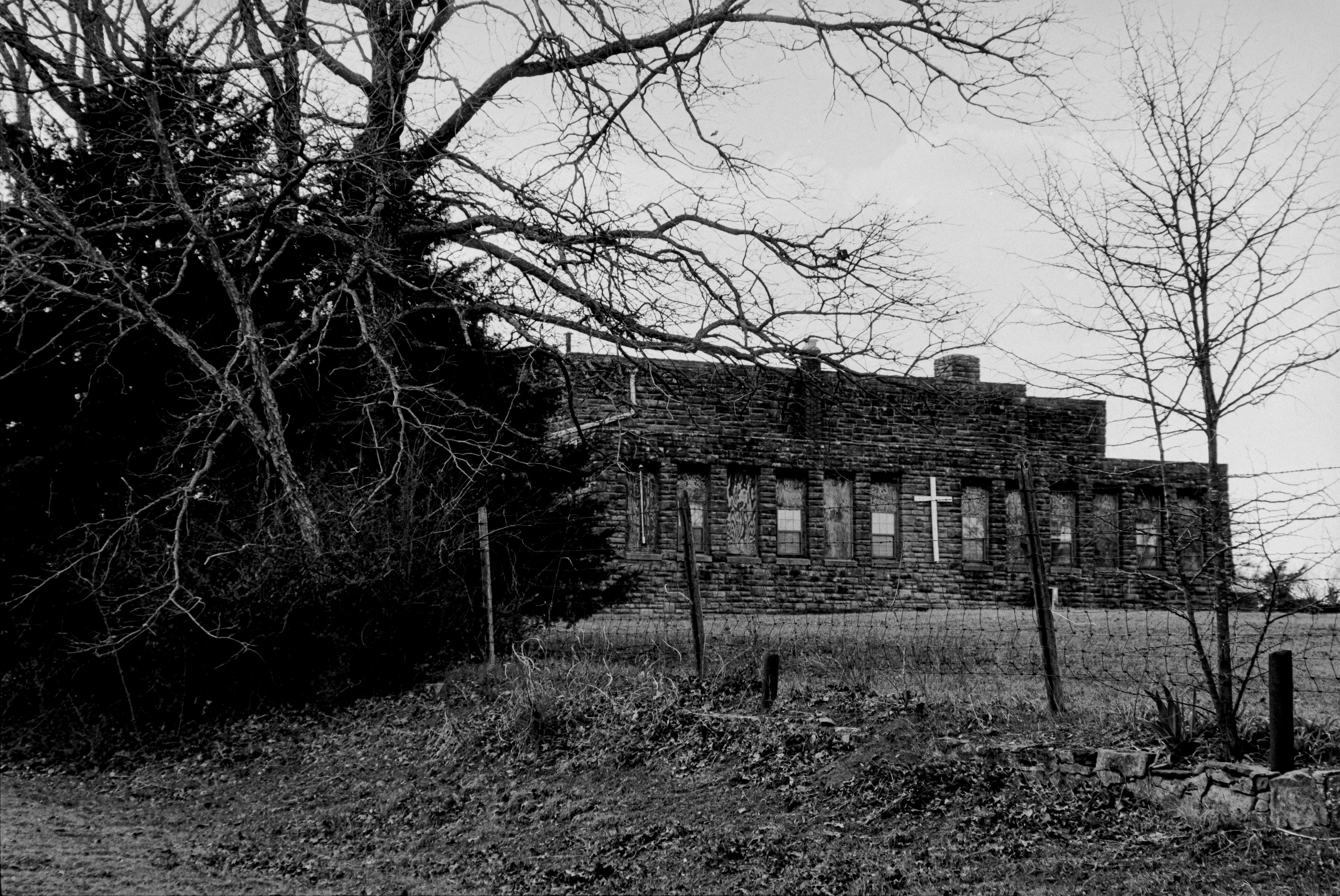
Abandoned church building in Meridian, Oklahoma

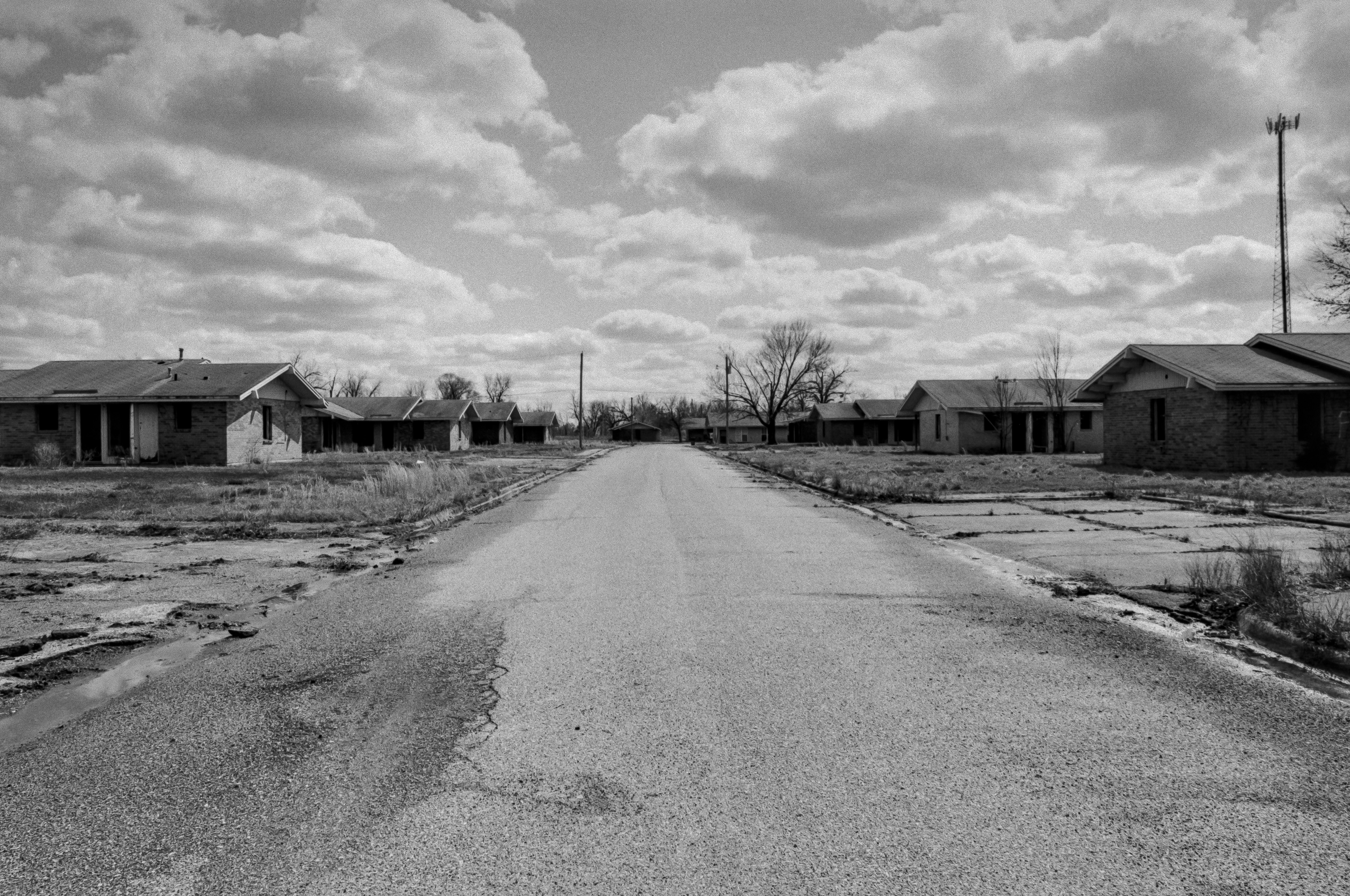
Abandoned duplex housing units in Picher, Oklahoma, the most recent ghost town in Oklahoma

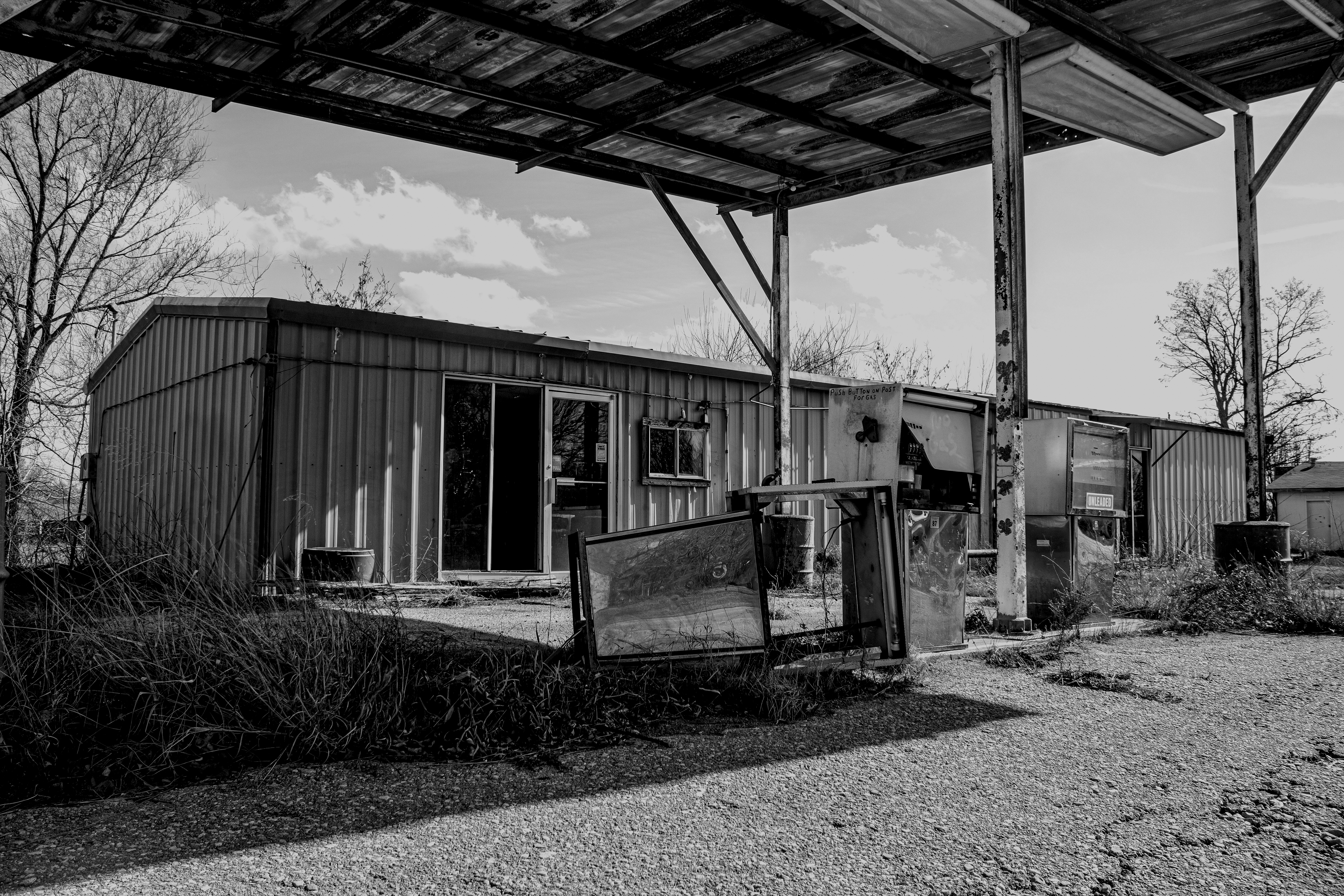
Abandoned convenience store with an attached gas station in Shamrock, Oklahoma

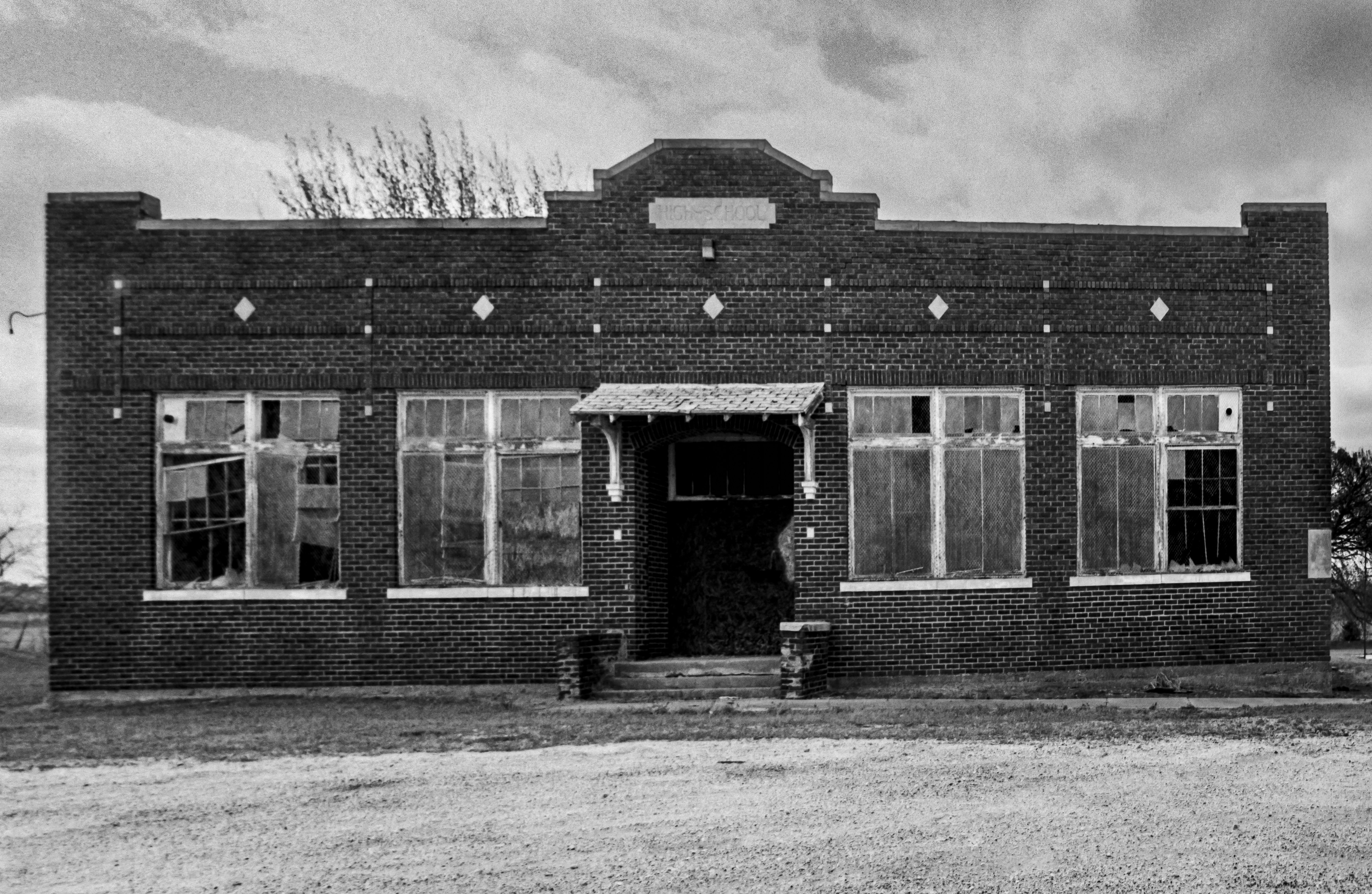
Abandoned high school in Skedee, Oklahoma

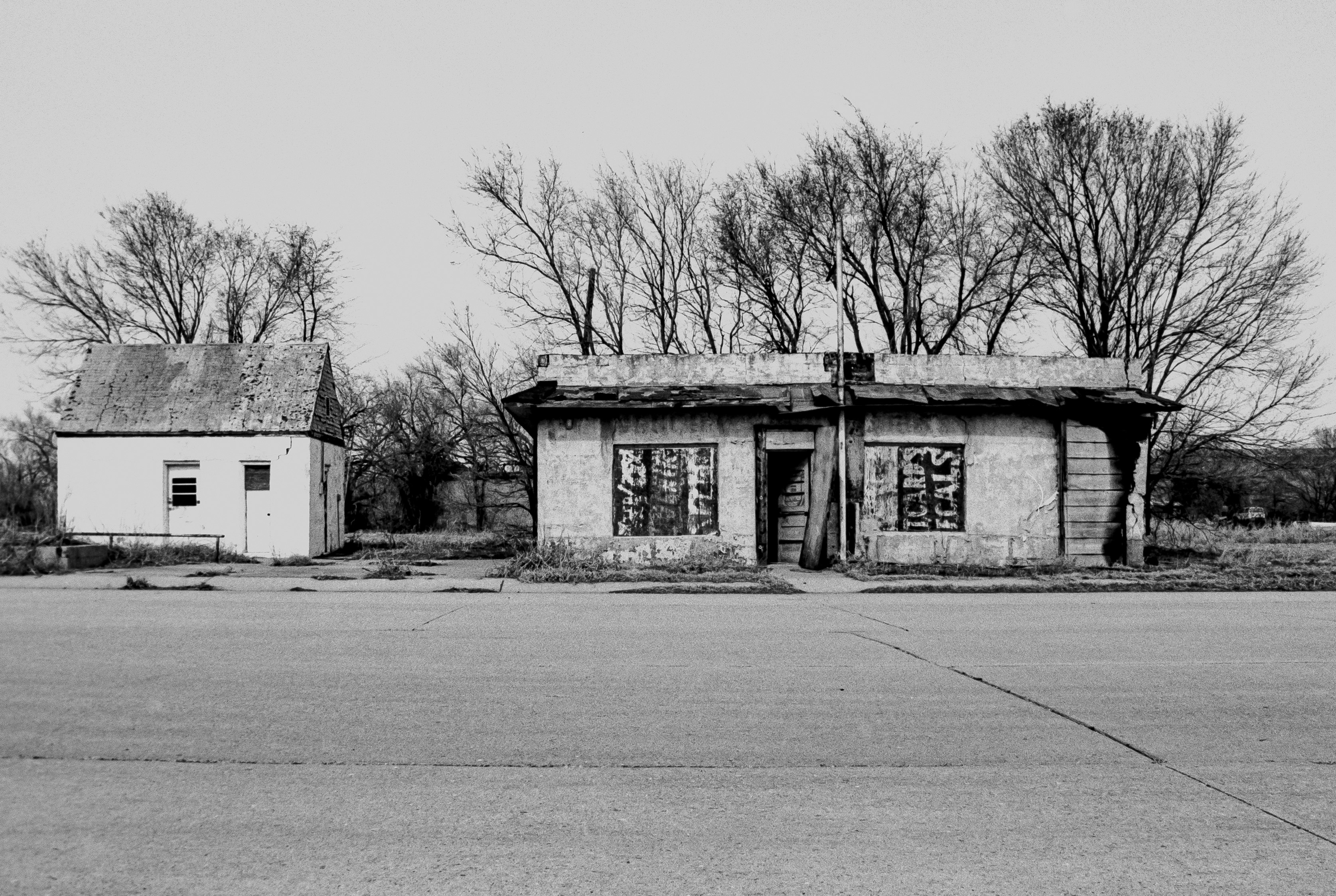
Abandoned restaurant and service station in Texola, Oklahoma

List of ghost towns in Oklahoma (Note: Although Oklahoma has an estimated 2,000 ghost towns, the following list only contains entries for locations that can be explicitly verified through a reliable source and have sufficient information to be assumed notable in their own right.)
Town	Other name(s)	County	Existed (Note: The year that the town was officially established or dissolved is listed when available. Some communities were never formally established. In other cases, the listed year may be the earliest or latest year in which a post office, school, railroad, major economic development, or a significant population existed. A year listed does not necessarily imply that the town has been formally dissolved or that the population in that location is zero.)		Current remnants/status	Ref(s).
Town	Other name(s)	County	Incorporated	Dissolved	Current remnants/status	Ref(s).
Academy	Armstrong Academy, Chahta Tamaha	Bryan	1844	c. 1921	Foundations and cemetery	
Acme	—N/a	Grady	1911	1930	Residences and ruins	
Adamson	—N/a	Pittsburg	c. early 1900s	1950	Residences and grocery stores	
Addington	—N/a	Jefferson	1901	c. 1930s	Businesses and abandoned structures	
Afton	—N/a	Ottawa	1886	1997	Small community and abandoned structures	
Akins	—N/a	Sequoyah	1894	1943	Few residents in an agricultural community	
Aline	—N/a	Alfalfa	1894	2000	Small community and abandoned structures	
Alluwe	Lightning Creek	Nowata	c. 1880s	c. 1950s	Current site of Oologah Lake	
Alpha	—N/a	Kingfisher	1893	1902	None	
America	—N/a	McCurtain	1907	1944	Current site of the Ouachita National Forest	
Atwood	Newburg	Hughes	1897	1967	Small community and abandoned structures	
Autwine	Virginia City	Kay	1899	1930	None	
Avard	—N/a	Woods	1904	2010	Restaurant, grain elevator, and abandoned structures	
Avery	—N/a	Lincoln	1902	1957	Residences and abandoned structures	
Beer City	White City	Texas	1888	1890	Agricultural use	
Benton	—N/a	Beaver	c. early 1880s	1920	Agricultural use	
Bernice	Needmore	Delaware	c. late 1880s	1941	Current site of Grand Lake o' the Cherokees	
Bessie	—N/a	Washita	1903	1950s	Small community	
Bickford	—N/a	Blaine	1904	1929	Current site of Roman Nose State Park	
Bigheart (Note: Former city limits annexed by Barnsdall)	—N/a	Osage	1905	1921	Few structures	
Big Cedar	Bigcedar	LeFlore	1903	1943	Gas stations and John F. Kennedy monument	
Blackburn	—N/a	Pawnee	1893	1960	Churches and abandoned structures	
Boggy Depot	Old Boggy Depot	Atoka	1837	1883	Cemetery	
Bridgeport	—N/a	Caddo	1893	1909	Grocery store	
Brinkman	—N/a	Greer	1910	1974	None	
Bromide	Juanita, Zenobia	Coal	c. early 1900s	1930	Grocery store	
Bromide	Juanita, Zenobia	Johnston	c. early 1900s	1930	Grocery store	
Brooksville	Lelian, Sewell	Pottawatomie	1909	1955	Residents and abandoned structures	
Burke City	—N/a	Okfuskee	1901	c. 1903	None, flooded by North Canadian River	
Byars	—N/a	McClain	1902	1964	Residences and abandoned buildings	
Caney	—N/a	Atoka	1879	1960	Small community	
Cardin (Note: Part of the Tar Creek Superfund site) (Note: After being incorporated in 1913, Cardin was officially dissolved for the first time in 1938. The residents re-incorporated in 1983 before the town was dissolved for a second time in 2010 after federal buyouts by the Environmental Protection Agency.)	Tar River	Ottawa	1913	1938	Abandoned	
Cardin	Tar River	Ottawa	1983	2010	Abandoned	
Carter	—N/a	Beckham	1900	2002	Small community	
Catesby	—N/a	Ellis	1902	1970	Church	
Cayuga	—N/a	Delaware	1884	1913	Structures	
Center	—N/a	Pontotoc	c. mid 1880s	1900	Vacant structures	
Centralia	—N/a	Craig	c. mid 1890s	c. 1930s	Store, post office, and abandoned structures	
Cestos	—N/a	Dewey	1892	c. early 1920s	Store and abandoned structures	
Cherokee Town	—N/a	Garvin	1874	c. mid 1880s	Agricultural use	
Clearview	Abelincoln, Lincoln	Okfuskee	1889	1992	Residences and abandoned structures	
Cloud Chief	Tacola	Washita	1892	1913	Church and abandoned structures	
Cold Springs	—N/a	Kiowa	1901	c. 1903	None, cleared for West Otter Creek	
Colony	Seger's Colony	Washita	1886	1941	Abandoned structures	
Cooperton	Cooper	Kiowa	1899	c. 1970s	Small community, population of 3	
Corbett	—N/a	Cleveland	1893	1930	Church and abandoned structures	
Crawford	—N/a	Roger Mills	1910	1930	Small community and abandoned structures	
Cromwell	—N/a	Seminole	1923	1930	Small community	
Cross (Note: Former city limits annexed by Ponca City)	—N/a	Kay	1893	1894	Unknown	
Denoya	Whizbang	Osage	1921	c. 1930s	Oil rigs and foundations	
Depew	—N/a	Creek	1901	Unknown	Small community	
Devol	—N/a	Cotton	1907	1959	Small community	
Doaksville	Fort Towson	Choctaw	1820	c. early 1900s	Cemetery	
Doby Springs (Note: Former city limits annexed by Buffalo)	Bellaire	Harper	1907	1912	City of Buffalo park and water source	
Dougherty	Henderson Flat, Strawberry Flat	Murray	1887	1993	Small community and abandoned structures	
Douglas City	—N/a	Oklahoma	c. 1890s	c. 1900s	Barren, wooded area	
Douthat	Century	Ottawa	1916	1970	Abandoned	
Downs	—N/a	Kingfisher	1889	1900	Agricultural use	
Eagle City	Dillon	Blaine	1902	1960s	Small community and abandoned structures	
Eagletown	Eagle, Eagle Town	McCurtain	1832	1920	Abandoned structures, new eponymous townsite still inhabited	
Earlsboro	—N/a	Pottawatomie	1891	1940	Businesses and abandoned structures	
Eschiti	Eschite	Tillman	1907	1909	Cemetery, agricultural use	
Fallis	Mission	Lincoln	1892	1970	Residences and abandoned structures	
Faxon	Slogan	Comanche	1902	1995	Abandoned structures	
Fay	—N/a	Dewey	1894	1969	Small community and abandoned structures	
Fleetwood	—N/a	Jefferson	1885	1961	Farms and abandoned structures	
Foraker	—N/a	Osage	1905	c. 1930s	Few residences	
Foss	—N/a	Washita	c. 1890s	1977	Grocery store, gas station, and abandoned structures	
Francis	Newton	Pontotoc	1894	1940	Businesses and abandoned structures	
Frazer	—N/a	Jackson	1886	1891	Agricultural use	
Frisco	Veteran City	Canadian	1889	1905	Only cemetery remains	
Gene Autry	Berwyn, Dresden, Lou	Carter	1883	1975	Small community	
Gerty	Guertie, Raydon	Hughes	1893	1965	Abandoned buildings remain	
Gotebo	—N/a	Kiowa	1904	1990	Small community and abandoned structures	
Gould	Gibson	Harmon	1917	1990	Small community and abandoned structures	
Grand	—N/a	Ellis	1892	1908	Landscaping and abandoned structures	
Grayson	Wildcat	Okmulgee	1897	1967	Churches and community building	
Gray Horse	—N/a	Osage	1884	1931	Residences and abandoned structures	
Hanna	Hasson	McIntosh	1902	1938	Schools	
Hanson	—N/a	Sequoyah	1888	1910	Few residences	
Hastings	—N/a	Jefferson	1902	1960s	Small community	
Hess	—N/a	Jackson	1889	1920	Abandoned structures	
Hitchcock	—N/a	Blaine	1901	1959	Small community and abandoned structures	
Hockerville	—N/a	Ottawa	1916	2010	Abandoned	
Hollister	—N/a	Tillman	1909	1968	Abandoned structures and ruins	
Independence	—N/a	Custer	1892	1922	None, agricultural use	
Ingalls	—N/a	Payne	1889	1938	Monument	
Ingersoll	—N/a	Alfalfa	1901	1942	Small community and abandoned structures	
Ioland	—N/a	Ellis	c. 1890s	c. 1920s	Nothing remains besides cemetery	
Jefferson	—N/a	Grant	1866	1974	Churches and few residents	
Jumbo	—N/a	Pushmataha	1906	1950s	Small community	
Kaw City	—N/a	Kay	1902	1970	Current site of Kaw Reservoir	
Kenton	Carrizo, Florence	Cimarron	1886	1913	Museum and post office	
Keokuk Falls	Keokuk	Pottawatomie	1891	1918	Abandoned structure	
Knowles	Sands City	Beaver	1906	1966	Grocery store and post office	
Kosoma	—N/a	Pushmataha	1888	1954	Residences and abandoned structures	
Lamar	Scott Company Town	Hughes	1908	1961	Churches and abandoned structures	
Lehigh	—N/a	Coal	1880	1956	Residences and businesses	
Lenora	—N/a	Dewey	1896	1955	Small community	
Lima (Note: Consolidated with the nearby town of New Lima)	—N/a	Seminole	1904	1978	School and abandoned structures	
Loco	—N/a	Stephens	1890	early 1980s	Small community and abandoned structures	
Lodi	—N/a	Latimer	early 1880s	c. 1950s	Land is bereft; minimal roads remain	
Logan	—N/a	Beaver	1888	1973	Cemetery and abandoned structures	
Lookeba	—N/a	Caddo	1898	1960	Small community	
Lost City	—N/a	Cherokee	early 1890s	2008	Small community	
Loveland	Harriston	Tillman	1908	1968	Small community and abandoned structures	
Lovell	Perth	Logan	1889	1950	Residences, abandoned structures, and foundations	
Loyal	Kiel	Kingfisher	1894	1940	School, agricultural use	
Lugert	—N/a	Kiowa	1901	1940	Ruins, current site of Lake Altus-Lugert	
Macomb	McComb	Pottawatomie	1903	1950	Small community	
Maramec	—N/a	Pawnee	1901	1957	Small community	
Marshall	—N/a	Logan	1890	1976	Small community and abandoned structures	
Martha	—N/a	Jackson	1889	1993	Few residences and abandoned structures	
May	—N/a	Harper	1896	1973	Post office and abandoned structures	
Meers	—N/a	Comanche	1901	1905	Abandoned structures	
Meridian	—N/a	Logan	1902	2000	Few residences and abandoned structures	
Mineral	Mineral City	Cimarron	1886	1910	Abandoned structures	
Moral	Old Moral	Pottawatomie	1892	Unknown	Only cemetery remains, wooded area	
Mouser	—N/a	Texas	1928	Unknown (Note: By 1975)	Abandoned	
Mulhall	—N/a	Logan	1889	1920	Small community and abandoned structures	
Mulhall	—N/a	Payne	1889	1920	Small community and abandoned structures	
Nash	Nashville	Grant	1894	1993	Small community and abandoned structures	
Navajoe	—N/a	Jackson	1887	1905	Cemetery	
Oakwood	—N/a	Dewey	1899	1958	Small community and abandoned structures	
Oktaha	—N/a	Muskogee	1872	1920	Post office and ruins	
Omega	—N/a	Kingfisher	1892	2009	Small community and abandoned structures	
Orlando	—N/a	Logan	1893	1964	Small community and abandoned structures	
Orlando	—N/a	Payne	1893	1964	Small community and abandoned structures	
Osage	Osage City	Osage	1906	1961	Church and post office	
Park Hill	—N/a	Cherokee	1836	1942	Cemeteries and tourism building	
Peoria	—N/a	Ottawa	1891	1941	Small community	
Picher	—N/a	Ottawa	1916	2010	Chat piles, abandoned structures, and foundations	
Pittsburg	—N/a	Pittsburg	1909	1959	Small community	
Port	—N/a	Washita	1901	1966	Few structures, agriculture use	
Putnam	—N/a	Dewey	1895	1950	Store, abandoned structures, and foundations	
Quay	Lawson	Pawnee	1894	1957	Few structures	
Quay	Lawson	Payne	1894	1957	Few structures	
Quinlan	—N/a	Woodward	1893	late 1920s	Church and few structures	
Reed	—N/a	Greer	1892	1975	Small community and abandoned structures	
Red Bird	Redbird	Wagoner	1902	1975	Church and abandoned structures	
Ringo	—N/a	Washington	1889	1900	Hotel	
Rocky	—N/a	Washita	1898	1967	Small community and abandoned structures	
Roosevelt	—N/a	Kiowa	1901	1993	Abandoned structures	
Rosedale	—N/a	McClain	1908	1971	Residences and abandoned structures	
Sacred Heart	Sacred Heart Mission	Pottawatomie	1879	1954	Small community and abandoned structures	
Santa Fe	—N/a	Stephens	1921	1950	Oil rigs and foundations	
Shamrock	—N/a	Creek	1910	2010	Small community and abandoned structures	
Silver City	—N/a	Grady	1883	1890	Cemetery, agricultural use	
Skedee	Lamert	Pawnee	1902	1963	Small community and abandoned structures	
Skullyville	Scullyville	LeFlore	1831	1917	Cemetery	
Slick	—N/a	Creek	1920	1930	Small community	
Sparks	—N/a	Lincoln	1902	1930s	Small community and abandoned structures	
Spencerville	—N/a	Choctaw	1844	Unknown	Small community	
St. Louis	Simpsonville	Pottawatomie	1906	1993	Small community and abandoned structures	
Stecker	—N/a	Caddo	1909	1954	Small community and abandoned structures	
Strong City	—N/a	Roger Mills	1911	1956	Small community and abandoned structures	
Stuart	Hoyuby	Hughes	1896	1940	School and residences	
Sugden	—N/a	Jefferson	early 1890s	1955	Small community and foundations	
Summit	—N/a	Muskogee	1896	1959	Cemeteries	
Sumner	—N/a	Noble	1893	1964	Churches and foundations	
Tahlonteeskee	—N/a	Sequoyah	c. 1828–1829	1839	Unknown	
Taft	—N/a	Muskogee	1902	1990	Small community	
Talala	—N/a	Rogers	1890	early 1920s	Small agricultural community	
Tamaha	—N/a	Haskell	1884	1964	Small community	
Tatums	Tatum	Carter	1894	1990	Small community and abandoned structures	
Texola	Texokla, Texoma (Note: Not to be confused with the Texoma region of Northeast Texas and Southeast Oklahoma.)	Beckham	1901	1990	Small community and abandoned structures	
Terlton	—N/a	Pawnee	1894	1962	Small community	
Three Sands	—N/a	Kay	1921	1951	Agricultural use	
Three Sands	—N/a	Noble	1921	1951	Agricultural use	
Vernon	—N/a	McIntosh	1910	1991	Residences and abandoned structures	
Vinson	Francis, Trotter	Harmon	1903	1964	Churches	
Wanette	Aberline	Pottawatomie	1877	1930	Small community and abandoned structures	
Warwick	—N/a	Lincoln	1892	1972	Small community	
Whitefield	—N/a	Haskell	1881	Unknown (Note: Whitefield is said to have begun declining during the Great Depression.)	Post office, agricultural use	
Willow	—N/a	Greer	1899	1957	Churches and restaurants	
Wirt (Note: Former city limits annexed by Healdton)	Ragtown	Carter	1913	1972	Abandoned structures	
Woodford	Bywater	Carter	1870	1974	Abandoned structures	
Woodville	Harney	Marshall	1880	early 1940s	Current site of Lake Texoma	
Yeager	—N/a	Hughes	1902	1974	Few residents	
Yeldell	—N/a	Jackson	1888	1908	Abandoned structures	
Yewed	—N/a	Alfalfa	1898	1958	Residences and abandoned structures	
Zincville	Berlin, (Note: Not to be confused with Berlin, Roger Mills County, Oklahoma); Schwarz, St. Louis (Note: Not to be confused with St. Louis, Pottawatomie County, Oklahoma)	Ottawa	1917	1954	Abandoned	

== See also ==
- List of ghost towns by country
