= Box, Cleveland County, Oklahoma =

Box, Oklahoma
- Ghost town
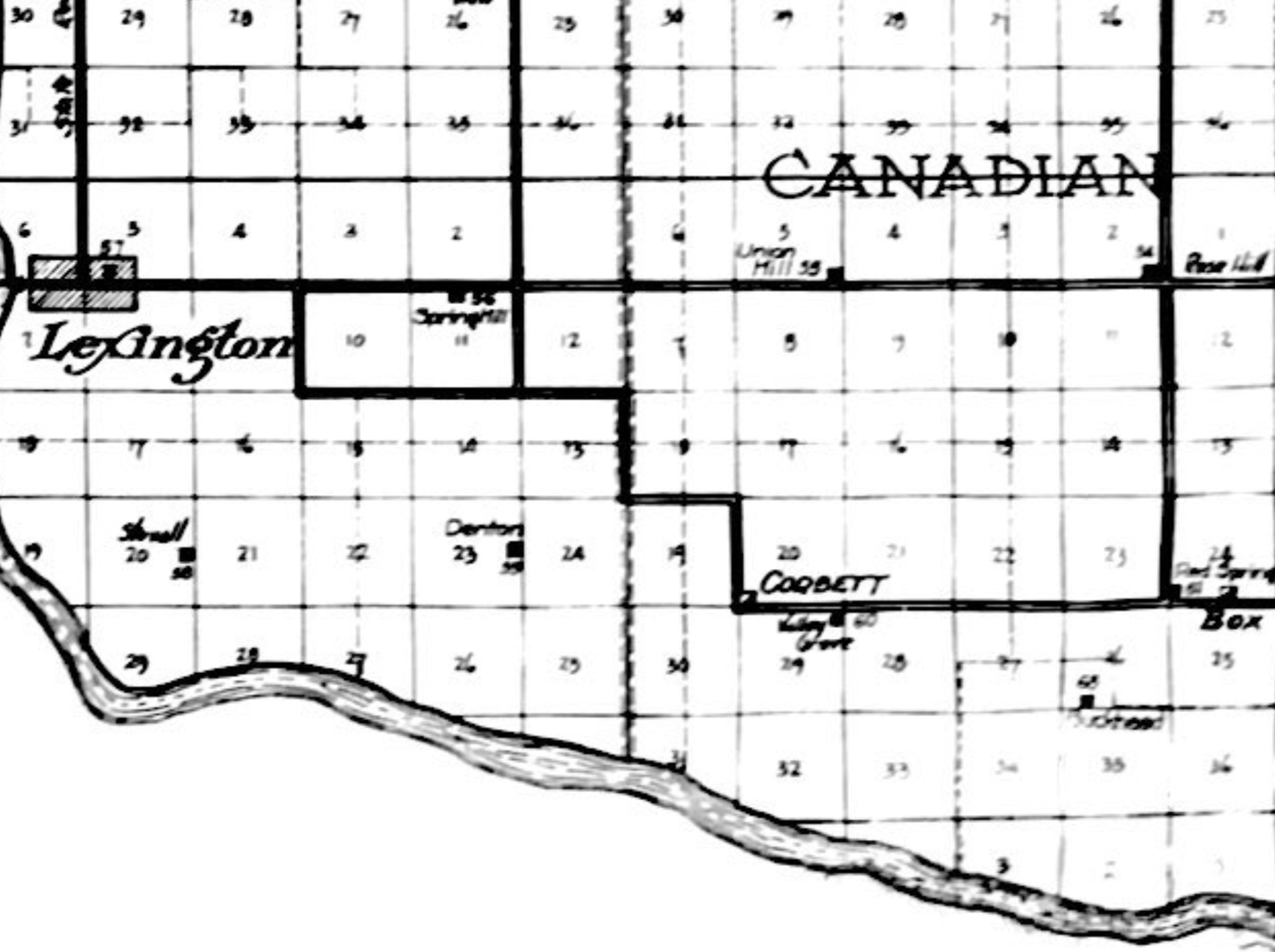
- Box (bottom right corner) and surrounding communities (1928)

- Location within Oklahoma Location within the United States
- Coordinates: 34°58′17.27″N 97°9′0.09″W
- Country: United States
- State: Oklahoma
- County: Cleveland
- Elevation: 1,050 ft (320 m)
- Time zone: UTC-6 (Central (CST))
  - Summer (DST): UTC-5 (CDT)
- ZIP Code: 73051

Box was one of many communities that sprung up during the late 1800s in the southern portion of Cleveland County, Oklahoma, United States. Box was the largest of these communities and was located east and south of Lexington, Oklahoma Territory. Not much remains there, besides the Box Cemetery.

== History ==
Around 1895, a man by the name of George Box established a cotton gin and saw mill in the area that became the town. Box's post office was established on May 7, 1898. In 1899, the town was being platted and surveyed for land owners to purchase lots in. The community was located on a resident’s farmland. On December 4, 1906, the post office was discontinued.

== Name variations ==
The Cleveland County Leader from 1899 contained a few old newspaper articles that identified the community as Boxville. Due to the seldom usage of that name, the locality soon became known simply as Box.
