= Moral, Oklahoma =

- Ghost town
- Nickname: Old Moral
- Location within Oklahoma Location within the United States
- Coordinates: 35°4′23.3″N 97°2′17.01″W
- Country: United States
- State: Oklahoma
- County: Pottawatomie
- Established: 1892
- Time zone: UTC-6 (Central (CST))
  - Summer (DST): UTC-5 (CDT)
- GNIS feature ID: 1093811

Moral (also seen as Old Moral) is a ghost town in Pottawatomie County, Oklahoma. Nothing remains there, besides the Moral Cemetery.

== History ==
Moral was founded in 1892, when a man by the name of Brooks Walker opened a store on a sandy crossroad in what was soon to be the town. He then proceeded to add a post office in 1894.

The town was named Moral due to the fact that the town's founder forbade saloons. The forbiddance was most likely because of the serious influx of alcoholism forming in Pottawatomie County and neighboring counties due to the surplus of saloons in surrounding towns. (Note: The other towns with a large amount of saloons included Violet Springs, Prague, and Keokuk Falls. Violet Springs and Keokuk Falls are now ghost towns.)

At one point, Moral had two doctors, two general stores, a hotel, and numerous businesses. The main occupation for citizens of Moral was supposedly catching squirrels. Eventually, the town's citizens decided to leave Moral and join the town of Tribbey, around 3.2 miles (5.1 km) northwest of their original town.

== See also ==
- List of ghost towns in Oklahoma
