= Yeldell, Oklahoma =

- Ghost town
- Location within Oklahoma Location within the United States
- Coordinates: 34°29′10.47″N 99°17′52.73″W
- Country: United States
- State: Oklahoma
- County: Jackson
- Established: 1888
- Elevation: 1,368 ft (417 m)
- Time zone: UTC-6 (Central (CST))
  - Summer (DST): UTC-5 (CDT)
- Disestablished: 1908

Yeldell is a ghost town in Jackson County, Oklahoma. It is 10.1 miles (16.3 km) southeast of Altus. Nothing remains there, besides the former town well and the Yeldell Lodge in Elmer.

== History ==
Yeldell was founded in 1888 by the three Yeldell brothers. The brothers got the land from the state of Texas, (Note: In 1888, all of the areas south and west of the North Fork Red River, which included the area of Yeldell, were owned by Texas.) which was paid for via the usage of a land scrip. Yeldell was 10 miles (16 km) northwest of the former town of Doan's Crossing, a village situated on the Red River's portion of the Great Western Cattle Trail.

Since most of the people traveling along the route had trouble carrying cattle across the river, they would usually be headed to a nine-mile long spring near the town, get slowed down, and stop in or around Yeldell. To add onto this, Yeldell was also situated on a road that went upward to Fort Supply, another resting stop on the trail.

Due to these two factors, Yeldell, now with a trading post and few residences, became fairly popular and frequented. The town gained a post office on May 28, 1892, alongside the aforementioned buildings. Eventually, another store, a blacksmith, and a doctor came to the town.

Shortly after the addition of the trading post, the brothers dug a well about 25 feet (7.6 m) deep, with a 5 feet (1.5 m) radius. Since this well was planted in sandstone and next to an old floodplain, water would regularly fill up in there, even during dryer years. After a while, Yeldell became a stage station to switch out horses while on the trail. Due to its ever-increasing popularity among travelers, Yeldell added a dugout schoolhouse for children due north of the trading post, had church meetings, and even create a Masonic lodge. (Note: This lodge is still active, but it is now considered to be in the town limits of Elmer, as seen at the top.)

=== Downfall ===
Around 1900, the town of Elmer started up around 3 miles (4.8 km) west of Yeldell. Alongside this, the crossroads village of Hess was founded 2 miles (3.2 km) southeast of Yeldell. The traction from Yeldell was slowly changed to go towards those two towns. The post office was also discontinued on December 31, 1904.

Years later, in 1908, the Kansas City, Mexico and Orient Railway decided to go from Altus to Elmer and straight through Texas, bypassing Yeldell. By then, the stage station and trail had long since been abandoned, and with no other use for the town, residents soon moved to Elmer. The remaining buildings were either destroyed or moved elsewhere.

== See also ==
- List of ghost towns in Oklahoma
