= Burke City, Oklahoma =

Coordinates: 35.35°N 96.35°W

- Ghost town
- Interactive map of Burke City, Oklahoma
- Country: United States
- State: Oklahoma
- County: Okfuskee
- Time zone: UTC-6 (Central (CST))
  - Summer (DST): UTC-5 (CDT)

Burke City is a ghost town in Okfuskee County, Oklahoma, United States. It existed from 1901 to 1903. The town was destroyed after it being flooded by the North Canadian River. The town was started by Tom and Wally McGee, two men from Chickasaw Nation forming a partnership with John Burke (the namesake of the town). They established a general store two miles east of Bearden, on the south bank of the North Canadian River.
