= Corbett, Oklahoma =

- Ghost town
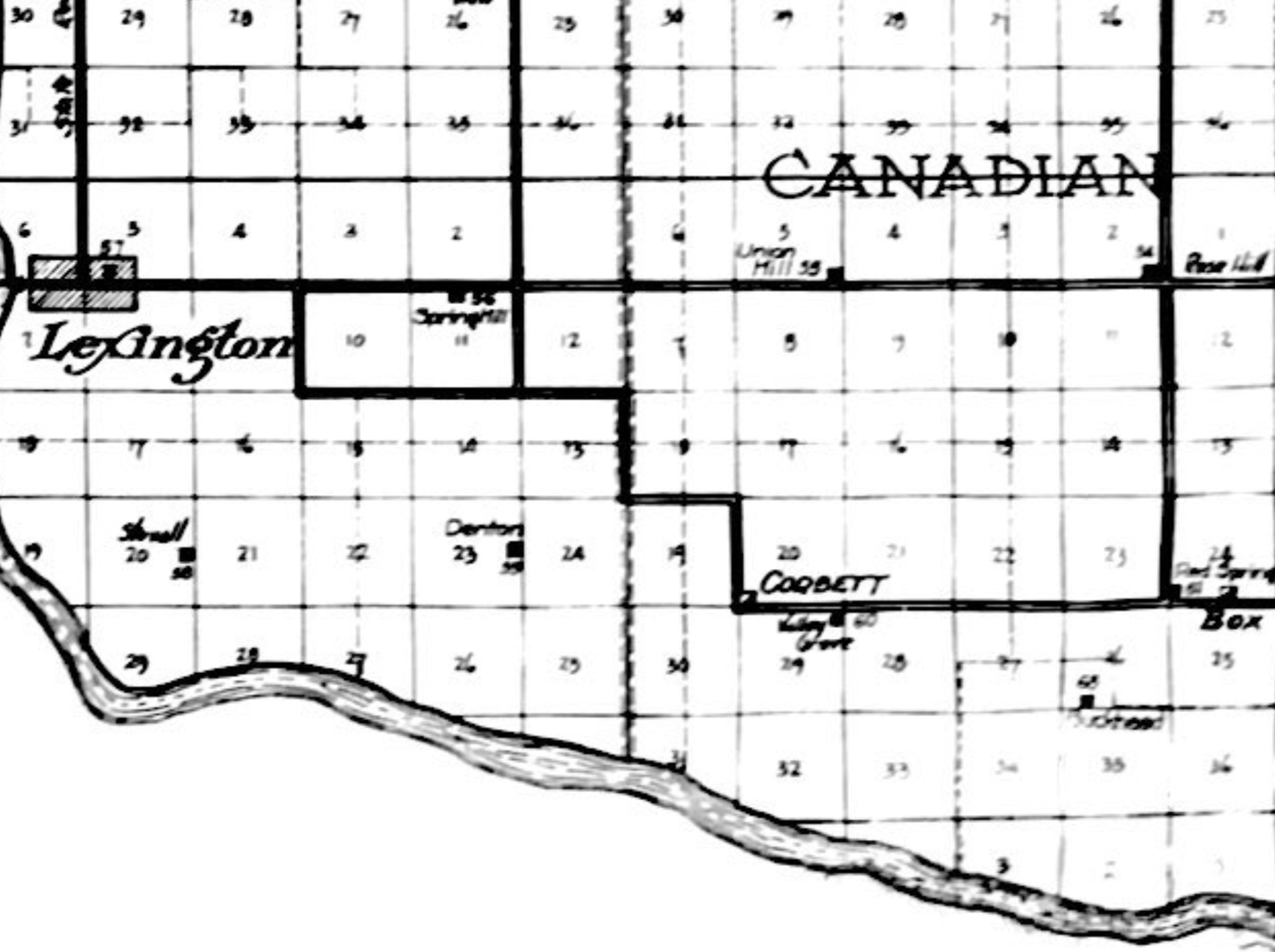
- Corbett (bottom right) and surrounding communities (1928)

- Location within Oklahoma Location within the United States
- Coordinates: 34°58′24.24″N 97°13′46.2″W
- Country: United States
- State: Oklahoma
- County: Cleveland
- Established: 1893
- Elevation: 1,080 ft (330 m)
- Time zone: UTC-6 (Central (CST))
  - Summer (DST): UTC-5 (CDT)
- Area code(s): 405 & 572

Corbett is a ghost town in Cleveland County, Oklahoma. It is 9 miles (14 km) southeast of Lexington and 2 miles (3.2 km) north of the Canadian River.

== History ==
Corbett started as an agricultural village in 1893 when J.P. Corbett bought 80 acres of farmland and platted a corner of his land for a village he was planning. He designated specific location in the town to have stores and shops. These included a blacksmith shop, cotton gin, sawmill, gristmill, a church, and others. These sites could be leased or given to people. If the buildings were used for other purposes instead of what they were intended for, the leaser would have to give back the area they leased. There was a forbiddance of alcohol and saloons in the village.

A post office for the town was created in 1901 under the alias of “Higbee”. In 1902, the name finally changed to “Corbett”, with the post office lasting until 1907. A few years after this, two stores and a sorghum mill were added to the town. The children in the village attended a one-room school 1 mile (1.6 km) east of the town known as the “Valley Grove School”.

Trading for the town was confined to the areas east and west of Corbett. Usually, cotton, fruits such as pears and apples, and vegetables such as corn were traded. The fruits were loaded in boxcars and shipped to the neighboring town of Purcell, where they would be sent to various markets around the town.

Corbett grew rapidly in the latter half of the 1920s. Its sharp decline happened in 1930 when the local cotton gin burned down, and the soil lost fertility. This, combined with the Great Depression made many people leave the town virtually abandoned.
