= Ringo, Oklahoma =

Ghost Town in Oklahoma, United States

Ringo is a ghost town In Washington County, Oklahoma, United States 4 miles N.E. of Ramona, Oklahoma. The town was abandoned over time as residents moved to neighboring towns.

== History ==
Between 1873 and 1875, William Ringo moved his family to Indian Territory.

In 1873 the Ringo family appeared on the U.S. Census for Tyro, Kansas. Leaving Kansas, the family settled on the Stokes farm, located northwest of Dewey, Oklahoma. Being in poor health, William Ringo's family took care of him until he died in 1875 and was buried in the Stokes Cemetery.

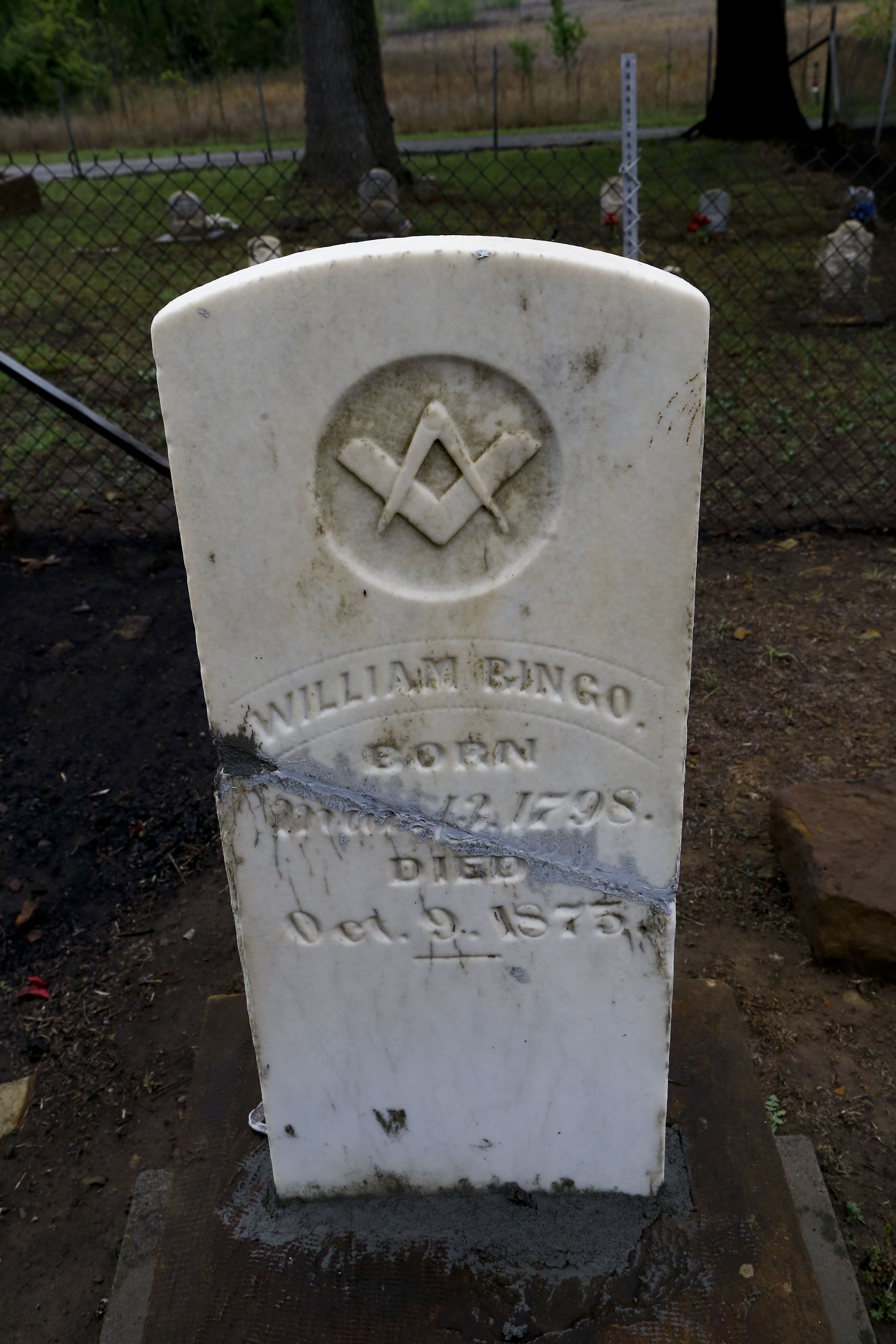
Headstone of William Ringo

Over the next ten years, the family moved into the business sector. In 1887 George Ringo opened a trading post on the west bank of the Caney River a few miles south of Oglesby. His daughter, Huldah Ann Ringo Bennett, opened a trading post a few miles away about the same time.

Over time the influence of the Ringo family grew and the area around George Ringo's trading post became known Ringo. In December, 1889, a post office was opened with Charles Keeler appointed as the first Postmaster.

The first school in Ringo was also used by the members of the Happy Hill Church, established in 1916.

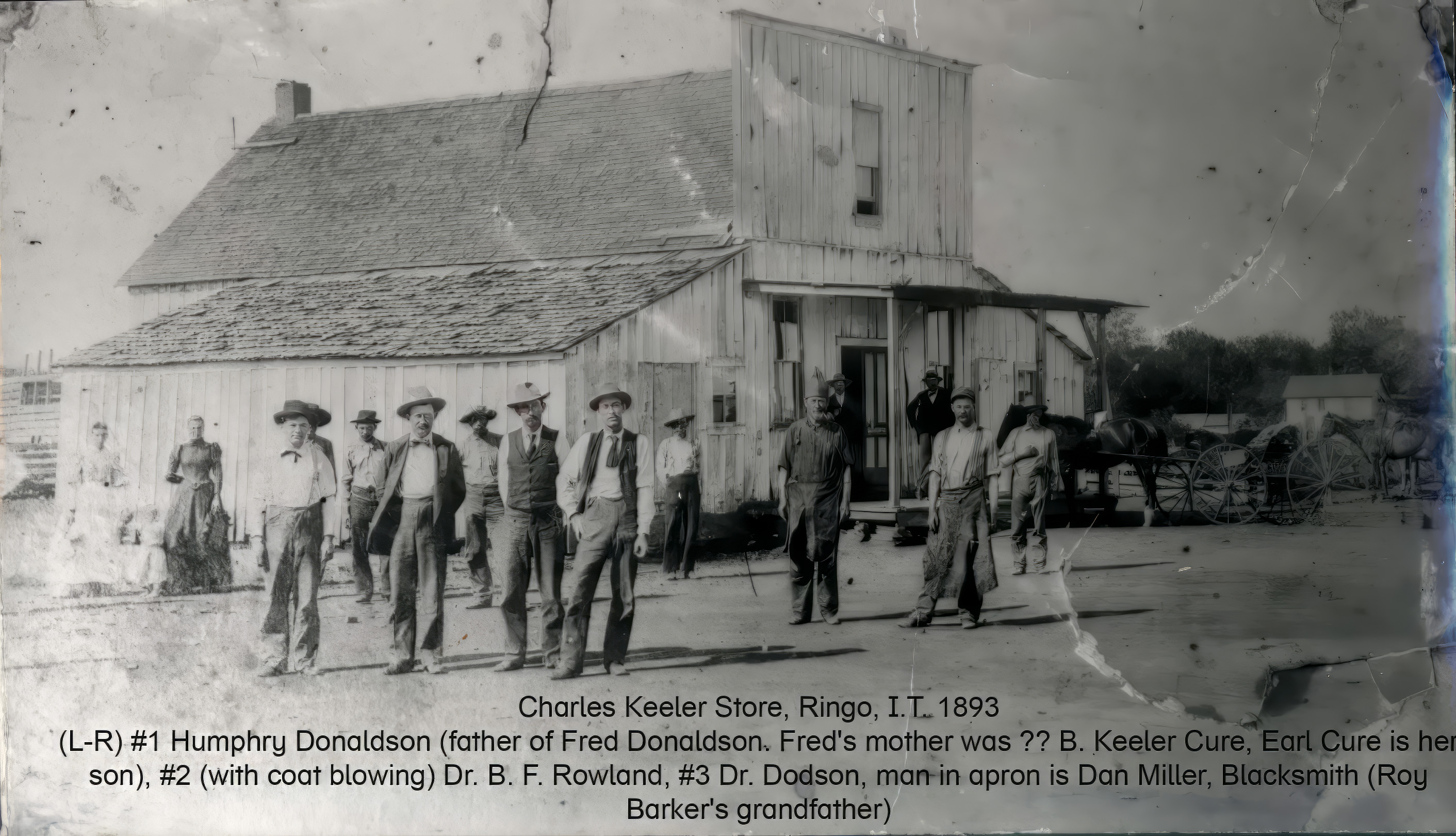
Charles Keeler Store in Ringo.

In 1921, the school board voted to end the meetings in their schoolhouse. The Church moved one mile south to a hay barn owned by John and Martha Street. According to the current administrator the Church members eventually moved the school house, using buckboards, to the Street property.

The revivals were well known for joyous laughing, shouting, and loud crying by the congregation. People passing by often remarked, "This is a happy hill." The Church picked up the nickname "Happy Hill Church" and eventually incorporated it into the official Church name.

Today, the only remaining structure associated with Ringo is the Ringo Hotel. It has been converted into a private residence.
