= Autwine, Oklahoma =

- Ghost town
- Etymology: Antwine Roy (1848-1911), a Ponca leader
- Location within Oklahoma
- Coordinates: 36°43′19″N 97°13′48″W
- Country: United States
- State: Oklahoma
- Founded: 1894
- Elevation: 968 ft (295 m)

Autwine is a ghost town in Kay County, Oklahoma, United States, formerly known as Pierceton and Virginia City. The town was named for a prominent citizen and leader of the Ponca Nation named Antoine Roy. It had a post office as Pierceton from May 26, 1894, and as Autwine from March 5, 1903, until June 30, 1922.

The town declined as an agricultural center after better roads in the area led to farmers taking their business to the larger business centers. Today, there is nothing left of the old townsite and the area is used for agriculture.

== History ==
The town was served by the Hutchinson and South Railway (Santa Fe.)

The town was first called Virginia City and was platted on June 17, 1899. Its post office was named Pierceton and the railroad called the station Arta. A meeting was held to determine a single name for the town, and they agreed upon Autwine.

The town was named after Antwine Roy, a leader of the Ponca Nation. There are two different stories of how the name was Autwine instead of Antwine. In one version, the Santa Fe railroad agent misspelled the name and refused to change it. In the other, the town clerk's poor penmanship on a record caused the name to come back from Washington as Autwine instead of Antwine.

The town was an agricultural center. At the turn of the century, the town had two elevators, a stockyard, and implement yard, a bank, ten other business establishments, and a doctor.

There were 25 homes in the town and more in the surrounding area.

Autwine was a regular shipping point for cattle, hogs and wheat.

The local ranches were the 101, the Little V, and the Big V.

Autwine also had a school servicing grades 1-8, with a high school in Blackwell, six miles away.

== Decline ==
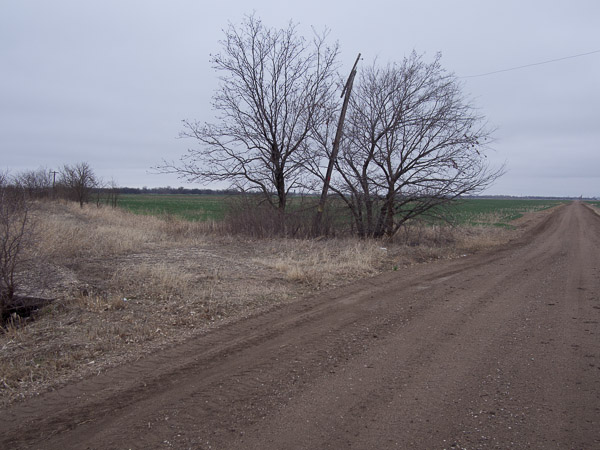
Current day Autwine, Oklahoma, is mostly agricultural land. An old railroad bed bisects the area.

As roads were improved in the early 1900s, Autwine declined as a trading center.

The bank closed in 1904.

Fire destroyed the business district in 1905, burning the grocery, dry-goods store, depot, blacksmith shop, general merchandise store, hardware store, and part of the lumberyard. Only one empty business was left standing. Most of the businesses did not rebuild.

By 1910 there was only one general store, a blacksmith shop, and one grain elevator in business.

The school was destroyed by a tornado in 1912.

The last store closed in 1930 and the elevator closed shortly thereafter.

== Today ==
All land from the town is now used for agriculture. Now, nothing is left.

The Autwine Oilfield in Kay County is named after the city.

== Geography ==
Autwine is located at 36°43′19″N 97°13′48″W at an elevation of 971 feet.
