= Cestos, Oklahoma =

- Ghost town
- Location within Oklahoma Location within the United States
- Coordinates: 36°8′40.6″N 99°5′39.2″W
- Country: United States
- State: Oklahoma
- County: Dewey
- Established: 1892
- Elevation: 1,870 ft (570 m)
- Time zone: UTC-6 (Central (CST))
  - Summer (DST): UTC-5 (CDT)
- Area code: 580

Cestos is a ghost town in Dewey County, Oklahoma. Remnants of the town exist today, including two homes.

== History ==
Cestos was an agricultural town located in northern Dewey County along the Cheyenne and Arapaho Indian Reservation. The area was being settled in 1892. The town reached its peak population, about 500 people, around 1905 to 1910. During that time, Cestos had several stores, a bank, hotel, and two newspapers.

Cestos was known for its flour mill, made by the Cestos Milling Company. They sold two brands that were marketed throughout the Oklahoma Territory. The flour mill grew the towns popularity around the time period.

== Downfall ==
Around 1915, the agriculture around the area changed from grain to cattle, making Cestos and their flour mill useless. The grain market moved away from the Cestos area, meaning Cestos was not in the limelight anymore and could not compete.
