= Frisco, Oklahoma =

- Ghost town
- Nickname: Veteran City
- Location within Oklahoma Location within the United States
- Coordinates: 35°32′38.95″N 97°46′6.86″W
- Country: United States
- State: Oklahoma
- County: Canadian
- Established: 1889
- Time zone: UTC-6 (Central (CST))
  - Summer (DST): UTC-5 (CDT)
- Disestablished: 1905
- Newspapers: Frisco Herald; Frisco News; Frisco Times

Frisco is a ghost town in Canadian County, Oklahoma. It is 2.2 miles (3.5 km) northwest of Yukon. Nothing remains there, besides the eponymous Frisco Road and Frisco Cemetery. The town was next to the north side of the North Canadian River.

== History ==
Frisco was platted in early 1889, with it being one of the only two townsites in Canadian County settled before the opening of the Unassigned Lands on April 22, 1889. The town was largely populated and settled by a group of American Civil War veterans. This gave the town the apt nickname of “Veteran City”. The town was named Frisco after the St. Louis-San Francisco “Frisco” Railway.

The group of veterans assembled in Kansas, with their main goal being to expand Civil War veterans rights and benefits. They proceeded to file the lots for this town, and move there in May 1889. Soon after the founding of the town, the estimated population was over 1,000 citizens. Alongside this, they had several stores of multiple varieties, a bank, a cotton gin, a sawmill, and two print shops. The town also gained a post office, which started running on May 18, 1889.

Despite the town laying on the northern edge of the North Canadian River, many of its citizens believed that the Choctaw, Oklahoma and Gulf Railroad, which was building through Oklahoma City, would pass through Frisco. Citizens also believed that the aforementioned Frisco Railroad would pass through the town too. Over the course of the towns existence, they had three newspapers, “Frisco News,” “Frisco Herald,” and “Frisco Times,” respectively.

=== Buildings ===
A majority of the buildings in Frisco were considered to be much larger than other buildings in similar frontier towns. A few examples of these were a large stone building that held a general merchandise shop; another building of similar stature that held a drug store. Frisco also had a hotel, named “The Occidental Hotel”, which was known for their good food.

Alongside those two buildings, Frisco had another large building that, while being erected in another town, was put alongside the northern edge of the town and used as a private school. The school, originally meant to be a hotel and named the “Oklahoma Frisco College”, was one of the two buildings made for said private school.

Besides the regular elementary and secondary school courses, the institution also offered college credits in commercial, normal, and pharmaceutical studies. The institution reportedly had around 150 students at one point.

=== Politics ===
Frisco, especially due to the founders of the town being Civil War veterans, was an active political center. An example of this happening is that the town held the first Grand Army of the Republic post in Oklahoma Territory ever.

==== County seat contest ====
Frisco went against El Reno to be the county seat of Canadian County, with Frisco barely winning the popular vote. El Reno decided to combat the popular vote through court and political strategy, and with the help of a railroad company, El Reno won the title of county seat.

Representatives in the territorial legislature from the Frisco area, after the win, proceeded to vehemently campaign against El Reno's claim of county seat. Eventually, this led to the first ever political convention being held in the Oklahoma Territory. (Note: The political convention was held in Frisco.)

=== Indian uprising ===
One of the considerably more notable events to happen in the short-lived town of Frisco was the so-called “Indian uprising”. (Note: “Indian” as in the outdated term referring to Native Americans.) The Indian uprising occurred one morning during one of the towns revival meetings. In the middle of the largely attended session, located inside of Frisco's Methodist Episcopal Church, specifically during the minister praying, a blacksmith ran into the building and started exclaiming something along the lines of “the Indians have broken out.”

The crowd, panicked, immediately started hiding the women and children in stone buildings (Note: See the “Buildings” subsection of the “History” folder for a similar structure.) and covering the outside of said buildings with cotton bales. The Grand Army of the Republic, who had set up shop in the town, started patrolling the streets on the lookout for any participants of the claimed uprising.

The uprising was eventually found out to be a false alarm. The blacksmith had apparently heard the rumor from a drunk railroad worker stationed in Fort Reno, a military fort near El Reno.

=== Downfall ===
The Choctaw, Oklahoma and Gulf Railroad wound up making a railroad below the North Canadian River, thus the town of Yukon being established surrounding the tracks. Within a small amount of time, most of the buildings located in Frisco were re-established in Yukon.

The rest of the residents still in Frisco eventually moved out, thus ceasing the towns existence. The post office in Frisco was discontinued on March 30, 1904. Some of the last legal works mentioning Frisco were in 1968. In the legal documents, they ask the court to get a decree vacating the premises of the former townsite of Frisco. The townsite, now considered in Yukon's town limits, was not officially accepted by Yukon, and the owner of the townsite wanted to use the area for agricultural purposes.

== See also ==
- List of ghost towns in Oklahoma
