= Grandfield, Oklahoma =

- City
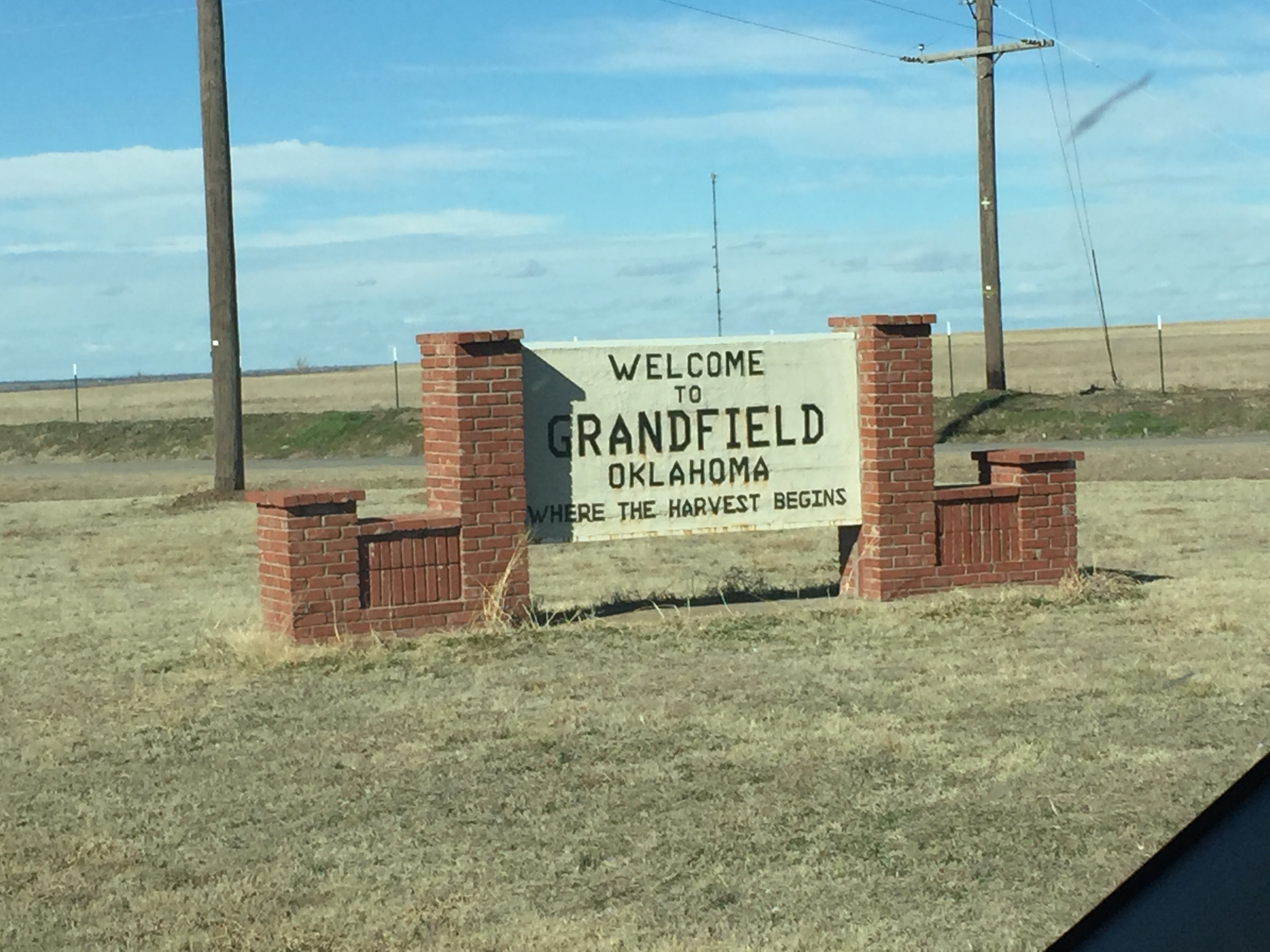
- Motto: Where the Harvest Begins
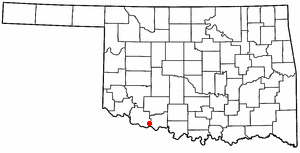
- Location of Grandfield, Oklahoma
- Coordinates: 34.2306677°N 98.6874219°W
- Country: United States
- State: Oklahoma
- County: Tillman

Area
  - Total: 0.83 sq mi (2.16 km^{2})
  - Land: 0.83 sq mi (2.16 km^{2})
  - Water: 0 sq mi (0.00 km^{2})
- Elevation: 1,122 ft (342 m)

Population (2020)
  - Total: 919
  - Density: 1,101.3/sq mi (425.22/km^{2})
- Time zone: UTC-6 (Central (CST))
  - Summer (DST): UTC-5 (CDT)
- ZIP codes: 73546, 73553
- Area code: 580
- FIPS code: 40-30850
- GNIS feature ID: 2410636

Grandfield is a city in Tillman County, Oklahoma, United States. The population was 919 as of the 2020 United States census. It is located about 30 driving miles southeast of the county seat of Frederick, and is situated at the intersection of US Route 70 and Oklahoma State Highway 36.

== History ==
=== Opening the Big Pasture ===
The Big Pasture, approximately 480,000 acres (1,900 km^{2}) bounded on the south by the Red River and presently located in parts of Comanche, Cotton, and Tillman counties, was the last settled territory in Oklahoma. Native control of the land traces to the Quapaw, who ceded it to the United States in 1818. The Choctaw and Chickasaw accepted the area in the 1820s and 1830s but lost it as a result of the Reconstruction Treaty of 1866. By the terms of the Medicine Lodge Treaty of 1867 a reservation that included the Big Pasture was set-aside for the Kiowa, Comanche, and Apache. The land became part of Oklahoma Territory in December 1906.

Opening bids to quarter-sections of the Big Pasture to prospective homesteaders began on December 3 and ended on December 15, 1909. There were over 100,000 bids for the available 1,830 quarter-sections. Bids varied from $5,800 to $7,376.

Prior to the opening of the area, the United States platted five official townships: Randlett, Ahpeatone, Isadore, Quanah and Eschiti. The only town remaining today is Randlett. Eschiti was the official town nearest the present site of Grandfield.

=== Founding ===
Problems began when the Wichita Falls and Northwestern Railroad missed Eschiti by two miles and Kell City (named for the railroad promoter Frank Kell of Wichita Falls) sprang up along the railroad's route.

By 1907, Eschiti had an official United States Post Office and Kell City had the railroad. Citizens from both towns were in heated competition for new settlers and businesses moving to the area.

To try to settle the differences, Reverend Andrew J. Tant, a Baptist minister and homesteader, went into partnership with Frank Kell and offered free lots to businesses if they would relocate to the Tant farm, which would eventually become Grandfield. Since the Tant farm was only about a mile from Kell City, people willingly moved. Free lots were also promised to all churches and schools. Observers at that time wrote they could look through their windows and see lines of houses being moved. According to Mrs. Lawrence Hooks, an early settler, she once cooked breakfast in Eschiti and dinner in Grandfield, without leaving her house.

A committee appealed to the United States Post Office to establish a post office. Assistant Postmaster General Charles P. Grandfield was helpful in granting the request. Consequently, the town was named in his honor. On January 16, 1909, Grandfield citizens voted, almost unanimously, for incorporation, and the post office opened January 21, 1909. In 1910 the population stood at 830. The town's founders and early residents came from a variety of locations, backgrounds, cultures and religions; The States of Kentucky, Tennessee, Kansas, Missouri, Arkansas and Texas were well represented, and a substantial number of newly arrived European immigrants also made their homes in Grandfield.

=== Oil boom ===
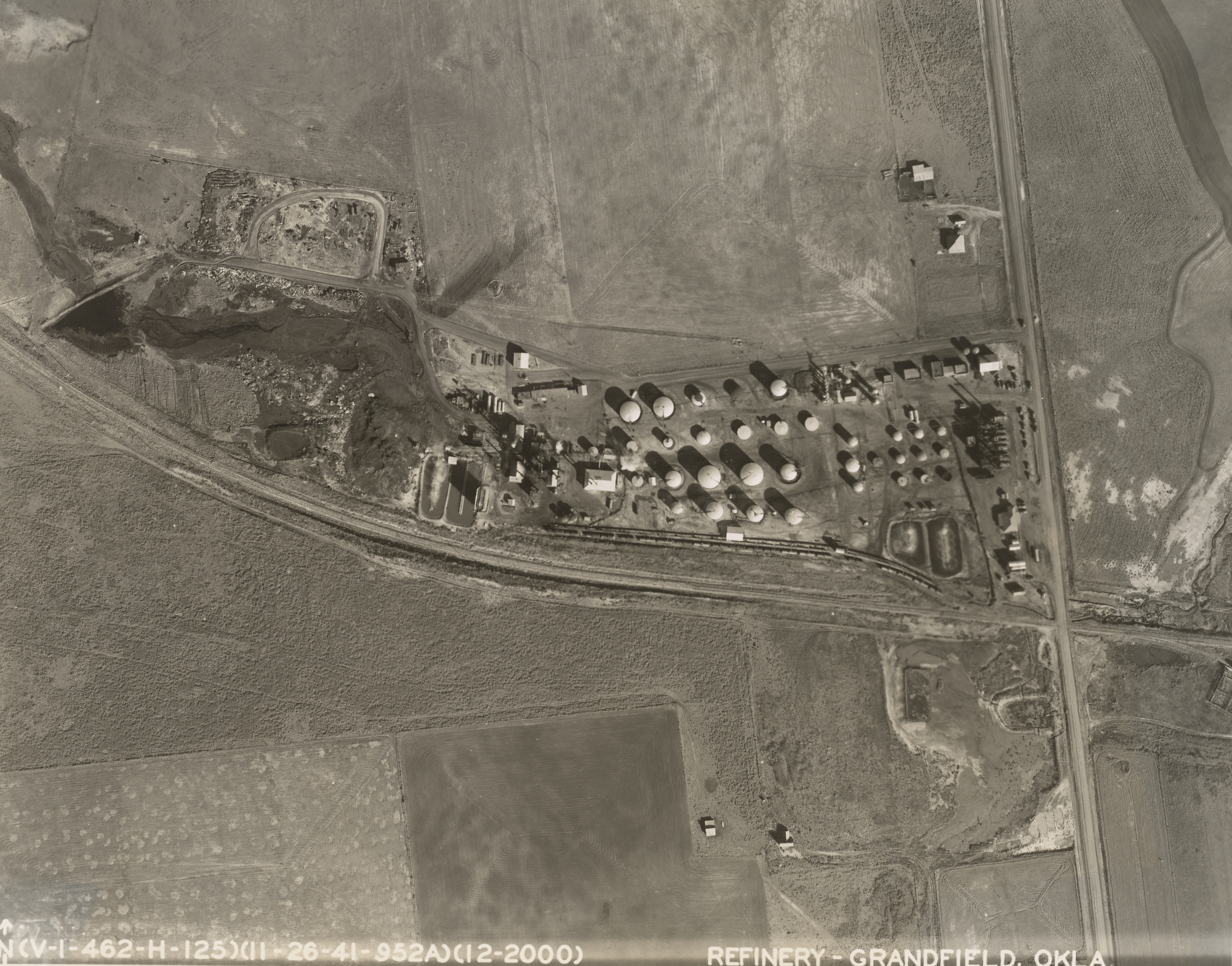
Grandfield oil refinery in 1941

There were two oil fields discovered in the Grandfield area: the Northwest Oil Field; and the Red River Oil Field. The influence of the oil industry on Grandfield cannot be overstated. The closing of the Bell Oil and Refinery Company refinery in the 1960s arguably started the population decline.

== Geography ==
According to the United States Census Bureau, the city has a total area of 0.8 square miles (2.1 km^{2}), all land.

=== Climate ===
Climate data for Grandfield, Oklahoma
| Month | Jan | Feb | Mar | Apr | May | Jun | Jul | Aug | Sep | Oct | Nov | Dec | Year |
|---|---|---|---|---|---|---|---|---|---|---|---|---|---|
| Record high °F (°C) | 86 (30) | 92 (33) | 99 (37) | 103 (39) | 111 (44) | 116 (47) | 113 (45) | 115 (46) | 113 (45) | 105 (41) | 88 (31) | 85 (29) | 116 (47) |
| Mean daily maximum °F (°C) | 52 (11) | 56 (13) | 64 (18) | 74 (23) | 83 (28) | 92 (33) | 97 (36) | 97 (36) | 88 (31) | 77 (25) | 63 (17) | 52 (11) | 75 (24) |
| Daily mean °F (°C) | 39 (4) | 43 (6) | 51 (11) | 60 (16) | 70 (21) | 79 (26) | 84 (29) | 83 (28) | 75 (24) | 63 (17) | 50 (10) | 40 (4) | 61 (16) |
| Mean daily minimum °F (°C) | 25 (−4) | 29 (−2) | 37 (3) | 46 (8) | 57 (14) | 66 (19) | 70 (21) | 69 (21) | 61 (16) | 49 (9) | 37 (3) | 27 (−3) | 48 (9) |
| Record low °F (°C) | −9 (−23) | −5 (−21) | 5 (−15) | 20 (−7) | 34 (1) | 46 (8) | 53 (12) | 50 (10) | 34 (1) | 16 (−9) | 12 (−11) | −13 (−25) | −13 (−25) |

== Demographics ==
Historical population
| Census | Pop. | Note | %± |
|---|---|---|---|
| 1910 | 830 | | — |
| 1920 | 1,990 | | 139.8% |
| 1930 | 1,416 | | −28.8% |
| 1940 | 1,116 | | −21.2% |
| 1950 | 1,232 | | 10.4% |
| 1960 | 2,606 | | 111.5% |
| 1970 | 1,524 | | −41.5% |
| 1980 | 1,445 | | −5.2% |
| 1990 | 1,224 | | −15.3% |
| 2000 | 1,110 | | −9.3% |
| 2010 | 1,038 | | −6.5% |
| 2020 | 919 | | −11.5% |
U.S. Decennial Census

=== 2020 census ===
As of the 2020 census, Grandfield had a population of 919. The median age was 41.5 years. 24.2% of residents were under the age of 18 and 22.0% of residents were 65 years of age or older. For every 100 females there were 89.1 males, and for every 100 females age 18 and over there were 94.7 males age 18 and over.

0% of residents lived in urban areas, while 100.0% lived in rural areas.

There were 387 households in Grandfield, of which 29.5% had children under the age of 18 living in them. Of all households, 39.0% were married-couple households, 24.8% were households with a male householder and no spouse or partner present, and 28.7% were households with a female householder and no spouse or partner present. About 32.0% of all households were made up of individuals and 16.8% had someone living alone who was 65 years of age or older.

There were 495 housing units, of which 21.8% were vacant. Among occupied housing units, 68.7% were owner-occupied and 31.3% were renter-occupied. The homeowner vacancy rate was 2.5% and the rental vacancy rate was 10.4%.

Racial composition as of the 2020 census
| Race | Percent |
|---|---|
| White | 59.4% |
| Black or African American | 8.5% |
| American Indian and Alaska Native | 3.7% |
| Asian | 0% |
| Native Hawaiian and Other Pacific Islander | 0% |
| Some other race | 12.8% |
| Two or more races | 15.6% |
| Hispanic or Latino (of any race) | 28.2% |

=== 2000 census ===
As of the 2000 census, there were 1,110 people, 434 households, and 295 families residing in the city. The population density was 1,387.9 inhabitants per square mile (535.9/km^{2}). There were 534 housing units at an average density of 667.7 per square mile (257.8/km^{2}). The racial makeup of the city was 71.98% White, 9.37% African American, 3.51% Native American, 0.18% Asian, 11.17% from other races, and 3.78% from two or more races. Hispanic or Latino of any race were 18.92% of the population.

There were 434 households, out of which 31.6% had children under the age of 18 living with them, 53.0% were married couples living together, 10.8% had a female householder with no husband present, and 32.0% were non-families. 30.2% of all households were made up of individuals, and 16.4% had someone living alone who was 65 years of age or older. The average household size was 2.49 and the average family size was 3.10.

In the city, the population was spread out, with 25.9% under the age of 18, 7.7% from 18 to 24, 24.1% from 25 to 44, 22.8% from 45 to 64, and 19.5% who were 65 years of age or older. The median age was 38 years. For every 100 females, there were 92.4 males. For every 100 females age 18 and over, there were 89.0 males.

The median income for a household in the city was $21,500, and the median income for a family was $27,222. Males had a median income of $23,281 versus $16,250 for females. The per capita income for the city was $13,823. About 20.7% of families and 26.7% of the population were below the poverty line, including 38.6% of those under age 18 and 10.8% of those age 65 or over.
