= Cross, Oklahoma =

- Ghost town
- Location within Oklahoma Location within the United States
- Coordinates: 36°42′30.1″N 97°05′21.1″W
- Country: United States
- State: Oklahoma
- County: Kay
- Established: before September 16, 1893
- Elevation: 1,122 ft (342 m)
- Time zone: UTC-6 (Central (CST))
  - Summer (DST): UTC-5 (CDT)
- Area code: 580
- Newspaper(s): Cross Resident; Oklahoma State Guide

Cross is a ghost town in Kay County, Oklahoma, United States. It is currently a residential area in a part of Ponca City.

== History ==
Before the Cherokee Outlet land run of 1893, the now former town of Cross was platted out as a way for new settlers to know that their stakes shouldn't be claimed at the townsite. Cross was planned to be the main city for the Cherokee Outlet. Other townsfolk also planned for the town to be the half-way rest station between travelers coming from Kansas City, Missouri to Galveston, Texas, and the freight terminal between Newton, Kansas and Purcell.

A railway station, an express station, freight station, and telephone office, were placed at the townsite at the time of it being created, and the post office followed soon thereafter.

Within months of the town being created, it had already boomed to a staggering 2000 people. Retail stores supplied goods for the townsfolk and travelers stopping by the town. The first ever factory built in the Cherokee Outlet was in Cross, and it created house furniture, and other simple items. Other factories, including a distillery, were built in the town afterwards. The town also included, what were considered at the time to be, “some of the largest hotels in Northern Oklahoma”. The town also had a considerably financially sound bank. Thee were also four churches, a school which in it had employed three teachers, and freshly created housing areas.

To add onto the booming cities ever so quickly growing population, the town had the Atchison, Topeka and Santa Fe Railway passing through it, attracting tons of people to the town.
