= Three Sands, Oklahoma =

Ghost Town in Oklahoma, United States

Three Sands was an oil and gas boomtown which sprang into existence about November 1922 and ceased to exist in 1957. It was located along the Tonkawa-Perry road, now US Route 77, in the area of the Kay County and Noble County border, in the State of Oklahoma.

== History ==
Three Sands was one of many populated places which sprung up in the Three Sands Oil Field, also known as the Tonkawa Field, which was discovered in mid-1921 in Noble County and which spread into Kay County in Oklahoma. The name of “Three Sands” referred to the three producing sands (stratigraphic layers) in the 8 sq mi (21 km^{2}) field early in its production history, although additional producing layers were discovered later. Settlements in the field sprang up at every road intersection, but Three Sands became notable for its size, for ending up in both Noble and Kay Counties, and for incorporating other such settlements.

The town had its origins about November 1922, and a month later had 500 to 1000 residents, eleven boarding houses, and numerous cafes, as well as machine and boiler shops, with a theater (the Cozy Theater) being completed. By January, 1923, the place had a two-story dance hall, with a second theater being built. However, much of the town was nothing more than shacks and tents. Located along the Tonkawa-Perry road, it joined the more-southerly and earlier settlements of Four Ways and Kanolka to make the appearance of a solid alignment of buildings running between the three. It was originally called Comar (after the Comar Oil Company), but by February 1923, the name of Three Sands was used interchangeably with Comar. At the request of the Tonkawa News for a definitive name, merchants met with oil company officials and the name Three Sands was adopted.

The settlement was never incorporated; however, In March, 1923, petitioners who were demanding a post office said that 2,000 people lived in the town and another 2,000 to 3,000 lived within a mile of it. A post office did arrive in June 1923, relocated from Four Ways. By September, 1923, a conservative estimate of the settlement’s population was 8,000, with a leading newspaper estimating 10,000 in the town and another 15,000 scattered over the field. The town eventually absorbed the settlements of East Side built a mile east of Three Sands, and Foster City built a mile west.

But population ebbed with the fortunes of the oil field, and by late summer of 1924 only about 7,000 persons remained within the entire field. Still, it was not until 1925 that the Tonkawa-Perry road was paved, becoming the present U.S. Route 77, that Three Sands could even boast of a paved road. By 1930, the settlement was down to a few hundred individuals, with about 2,000 persons scattered over the oil field. A Santa Fe rail spur between Three Sands and Marland, Oklahoma was abandoned in August 1942. The high school closed in 1946; the last retail establishment, a grocery store, closed in 1951; and, the final blow was the closure of the post office in 1957. The settlement joined the ranks of Kay/Noble Counties' oil-boom ghost towns.

== See also ==
- List of ghost towns in Oklahoma
