= Beer City, Oklahoma =

Coordinates: 36.964°N 100.928°W

- Ghost town
- Nickname: "The Sodom and Gomorrah of the Plains"
- Interactive map of Beer City, Oklahoma
- Country: United States
- State: Oklahoma
- County: Beaver

Beer City was a town in Beaver County, Oklahoma. It is now a wheat field, and there are no physical remnants of the town besides a few photographs and newspaper clippings. It was formerly in Texas County, Oklahoma, but it is now in Beaver County, Oklahoma.

== History ==
Beer City was founded in 1888 in No Man's Land. No Man's Land was created when Texas sought to enter the Union in 1845 as a slave state. Federal law in the United States at the time, based on the Missouri Compromise, prohibited slavery north of 36°30' parallel north. Under the Compromise of 1850, Texas surrendered its lands north of 36°30' latitude. "No Man's Land" was the 170-mile strip of land, a "neutral strip", that was left with no state or territorial ownership from 1850 until 1890. The town started as a cluster of white tents, which gave it its original name, White City. Kansans moved to the area in Oklahoma to start White City due to strict alcohol prohibition laws in Kansas. The name was changed to "Beer City" after the rowdiness of the townsfolk.

At its peak, Beer City had a handful of saloons, gambling houses, and brothels. Due to the town having no rules, Beer City was mainly filled with outlaws. The most notorious one was a lady by the name of "Pussy Cat Nell". She ran and owned "Yellow Snake Saloon" in the town. One of the noteworthy events in the town's history occurred when she, along with a group of 14 other men, shot and killed a man with the self-proclaimed title, "Sheriff Bush". They killed this man because the townsfolk believed he was unfairly extorting them. He had 74 gunshot wounds in his body.

In 1890, the town was included into the Oklahoma Territory with the passage of the Oklahoma Organic Act, and ceased to exist.

== See also ==
- List of ghost towns in Oklahoma
