= Douglas City, Oklahoma =

- Ghost town
- Location within Oklahoma Location within the United States
- Coordinates: 35°37′51.77″N 97°15′22.05″W
- Country: United States
- State: Oklahoma
- County: Oklahoma
- Established: c. 1890
- Time zone: UTC-6 (Central (CST))
  - Summer (DST): UTC-5 (CDT)
- Disestablished: c. 1900

Douglas City is a ghost town in Oklahoma County, Oklahoma. It is 3.4 miles (5.5 km) southwest of Luther; nothing remains there anymore, with the former townsite now being mainly wooded area. There is an active church with the Douglas name located in the southeastern corner of the remnants of the town, and the Turner Turnpike runs through the towns remnants, however.

== History ==
Douglas City started in the early 1890s as a pop-up town in the Unassigned Lands. The town was started by multiple entrepreneurs of African-American descent, as Douglas City was founded as a black settlement. It is believed that more than 200 lots had been sold to African-American families.

By 1893, the town had a general store, a cotton gin, a gristmill, a few residences, and a church. (Note: The church wound up moving locations to where the modern one, mentioned in the top section, is today.) A post office for the town was created on May 12, 1894.

The town was set to have 160 acres, wide streets, and lots 25 feet by 140 feet; ten acres were kept for the creation of the Douglas City Public School, which was later built. (Note: The school was later merged with Luther Public Schools.)

The developers of the town believed the town would be successful, largely for two reasons, with one reason being that Douglas City was on a survey line for the proposed Midland Railroad. The railroad was supposed to go from Coffeyville, Kansas, to McAlester, Oklahoma, adding onto the Missouri Pacific Railroad. The railroad, however, never got built.

The second reason developers of Douglas City thought it would be successful was that they offered to donate 20 acres of the land to the state of Oklahoma for the Territorial Normal School for Negroes. The university, however, was put in Langston, with it being still up under the name of Langston University.

Due to the fact that the main two factors of the towns success were never put into motion, the towns population declined. The post office for the town ended on June 15, 1900.

== See also ==
- List of ghost towns in Oklahoma
