= Eschiti, Oklahoma =

- Ghost town
- Nickname: Eschite
- Location within Oklahoma Location within the United States
- Coordinates: 34°14′20.55″N 98°39′11.77″W
- Country: United States
- State: Oklahoma
- County: Tillman
- Established: 1907
- Elevation: 1,168 ft (356 m)
- Time zone: UTC-6 (Central (CST))
  - Summer (DST): UTC-5 (CDT)
- Disestablished: 1909
- Newspapers: Eschiti Banner

Eschiti (also stylized as Eschite) is a ghost town in Tillman County, Oklahoma. Eschiti is 1.8 miles (2.9 km) northeast of the town of Grandfield; it is in the southeastern portion of the county. The town is entirely barren, with the only exception being the aptly named Eschiti Cemetery, 1/2 mile (0.80 km) east of the Grandfield Memorial Cemetery, and currently on private property. (Note: The last action Eschiti did as a town was create the Eschiti Cemetery.) The rest of the town is used for agricultural purposes.

== History ==
Eschiti started in 1907, when the United States Department of the Interior advertised, platted, and sold the townsite (Note: The townsite was sold alongside four others. The four towns were Ahpeatone, Isadore, Quanah, and Randlett. Of the five, only Randlett is still majorly populated, with both Randlett and Ahpeatone being the only two still in existence.) after the opening of the Big Pasture. In said advertisements, Eschiti was referred to as the “Princess of the Pasture”. The town was named in honor of the eponymous second chief of the Comanches, Eschiti. (Note: Chief Eschiti’s name has also been seen as Isatai'i or Isatai. These, however, are both not another name for the town of Eschiti.)

In 1908, Eschiti had an estimated population of 300, twenty miscellaneous businesses, a bank, two doctors, a funeral director, and two cotton gins, with cotton being the main agricultural product for the town. During the final three months of 1907, one of the two cotton gins alone sent over 2,500 bales of cotton. There were also two active churches and a schooling program.

=== Eschiti vs. Kell City rivalry ===
Eschiti only existed for two years, with the population being about 1,200 when the town started, but in the span of those two years multiple events occurred. Soon after Eschiti was founded, the Wichita Falls and Northwestern Railway expanded their railroads across the Red River, which meant expansion into Oklahoma, and what was supposed to be Eschiti. However, a civil engineer from Wichita Falls, Texas, by the name of Frank Kell, alongside many others, decided to start a town. The people created the town out of impatience waiting for Eschiti to be opened up to the public. One of the original buildings in the town was a barn created by J.W. Field, another civil engineer.

The town, named Kell City (Note: The towns name has also been seen as just “Kell”.) and established 2 miles (3.2 km) southwest of Eschiti, got the railway to pass through their town instead. This happened due to the fact that Kell was a townsite promoter, and barred the railway from passing through Eschiti. In return, the United States government established a post office in Eschiti on October 31, 1907, but refused to establish one in Kell City. Due to these two actions, the rivalry between Eschiti and Kell City began.

==== Newspaper arguments ====
The “Kell City Enterprise”, a newspaper for the town of Kell City, during a paper published on October 17, 1907, made fun of Eschiti. In the editorial, they portrayed themselves as a small yet prominent and passionate community, whereas the town of Eschiti was described by them as unimportant. Directly quoting from the page, they say “… Eschiti essays to be the business rival of Kell City, but she is not making any more noise than the passing regiment of pussy-footed caterpillars.” The “Eschiti Banner”, Eschiti’s newspaper, responded with an entire page filled with largely sarcastic comments about the town of Kell City.

==== Lawsuit ====
The matter between the two was taken into the court, where seventh district judge, Frank E. Gillette, ruled over the case of Eschiti vs. Kell City. Eschiti applied for an injunction against the town of Kell City so that way any of their citizens could not occupy the land they lived on, nor make the railway go through their town. The injunction was denied.

Eschiti also attempted to erect a rail depot for their town via instructing the rail company to do so through means of verbal force, as Eschiti’s citizens said that the original decision of putting a depot in Kell City and not their own town was unjust.

==== Post office move ====
During one night, citizens of Kell City went to Eschiti and proceeded to haul the entire frame post office from Eschiti to their town. A post office clerk, who stayed in the building overnight, stated that when he awoke, he was surprised to see that the building had been moved.

The following day of the switch, United States Marshals went to Kell City to question some of the residents for the entire story. During that days night, the post office was moved back to Eschiti.

Due to most of the citizens of Kell City not wanting to visit Eschiti for their mail, they made a few of their other citizens become a mail carrier. The mail carriers, who went to the post office every day, sent outgoing mail to Wichita Falls, while also taking any incoming mail back to Kell City.

=== Downfall ===
Despite having multiple positive factors, Eschiti also had its fair share of problems. Eschiti’s water supply was mainly gypsum water, (Note: Also seen as “gyp” water.) which meant that the water was bad in flavor. To add onto this, the transportation facilities in Eschiti were poorly built, and a fire destroyed a large portion of the business area.

The rivalry between both Kell City and Eschiti turned out to largely wipe out the town, as a reverend by the name of A.J. Tant, owner of a quarter section of land between both towns, platted and sold his land. He also gave out free lots to anyone from either town willing to build or move their property over to the land.

Since the new site had considerably more advantages than both Eschiti and Kell City, and that both the towns citizens had compromised, all people from both towns moved to this site, and by 1909, both of them were desolate of any residents. The site, now a town named Grandfield, is still active. The post office for Eschiti was discontinued on January 21, 1909.

== See also ==
- List of ghost towns in Oklahoma
