= America, Oklahoma =

Ghost town in Oklahoma, United States

- ghost town
- Location of the ghost town of America within the state of Oklahoma.
- Coordinates: 33°48′56″N 94°32′58″W
- Country: United States

America is a ghost town in southeastern McCurtain County, Oklahoma, United States. It was located 7 miles southeast of Haworth. The town was named after America Stewart, wife of Tom Stewart, a local resident.

== History ==
America grew around a sawmill built by William Spencer and his three brothers in 1907. The Spencer family built 40 houses to lease to sawmill workers, and by 1910 there were 200 people living in America. In 1911, after all the timber had been cut, Spencer opened a cotton gin and general store and became a cotton buyer. Cotton grown on the cleared land was shipped out by the Arkansas and Choctaw Railway (a predecessor of the Frisco) that ran through the town. After cotton production declined in the 1920s, most residents moved out. The cotton gin closed in 1933, around the time when the Great Depression was at its worst. Buck and Blanche Barrow, associates of Bonnie & Clyde were married in America on July 3, 1931. The post office, established since July 24, 1903, was disestablished on February 15, 1944. The general store closed the next year, completing the decline.

Today, part of the former townsite of America is in the Ouachita National Forest. Only two old houses and a railroad marker remain.

== See also ==
- List of ghost towns in Oklahoma
