= Cherokee Town, Oklahoma =

- Ghost town
- Location within Oklahoma Location within the United States
- Coordinates: 34.699°N 97.151°W
- Country: United States
- State: Oklahoma
- County: Garvin
- Time zone: UTC-6 (Central (CST))
  - Summer (DST): UTC-5 (CDT)

Cherokee Town is a ghost town in Garvin County, Oklahoma. It was located 6 miles (9.7 km) southeast of Pauls Valley.

== History ==
Before the Civil War, there was a trading post near Little Sandy Creek, about a mile from where a heavily used trail crossed the Washita River. The stop was unnamed until a group of Cherokees who forcefully resettled from Texas moved near the vicinity of the post. The Cherokee people built homes and other infrastructure around the area, and along with the post, which has its own blacksmithing place, made the now forming town popular. The town was then on referred to as “Cherokee Town”.

Despite the village remaining small, it was well known around the area. After the Civil War, mainly during the 1870s, the trail became very important across the Choctaw and Chickasaw nations, as it connected Boggy Depot and Fort Sill. Cherokee Town started to gain importance when a cross-country stage line was started, designated at 20 miles (32 km) intervals. Many goods wagons and buggies would come through the town. Militia and their subsequent wagons with weapons would go through the town as-well.

As a result of the conundrum, the town slowly increased. Several stores were developed, even hotels and campsites were created too. There was a masonic hall and a town doctor. Blacksmithing was the towns main driving point and moneymaker. The blacksmith was deemed a pan important person throughout the community. Church services were held at the town, and there were subscription schools too. As the population of the Chickasaw nation increased, new paths were created and replaced to different areas, cutting off the towns traffic.
