= Lodi, Oklahoma =

- Ghost town
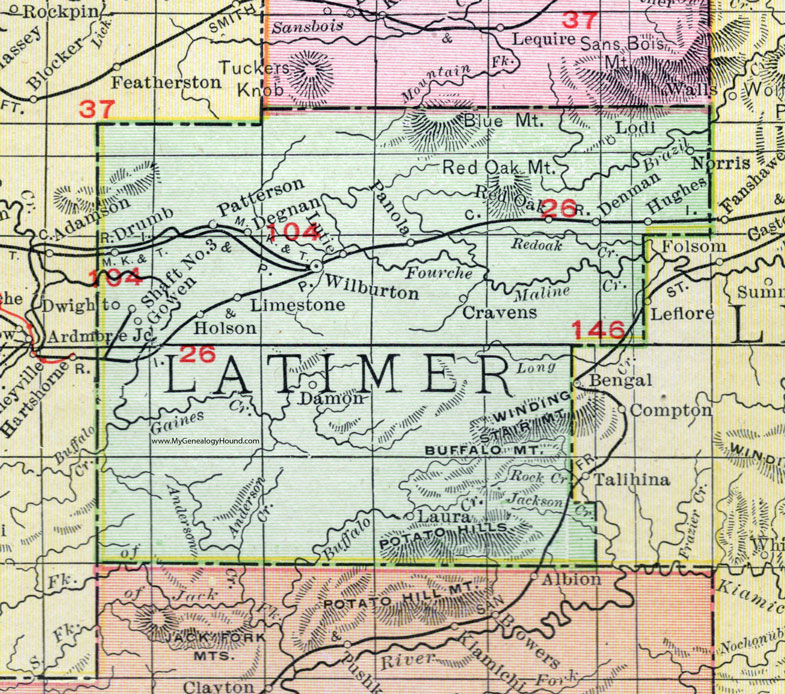
- Lodi is in the top-right corner of Latimer County.

- Location within Oklahoma Location within the United States
- Coordinates: 35°0′33.43″N 95°2′31.69″W
- Country: United States
- State: Oklahoma
- County: Latimer
- Established: c. 1880
- Elevation: 646 ft (197 m)
- Time zone: UTC-6 (Central (CST))
  - Summer (DST): UTC-5 (CDT)

Lodi (pronounced "low-dye") is a ghost town in Latimer County, Oklahoma, United States. Nothing remains of the former town. It is nestled within the southern slope of the Sans Bois Mountains, and is 7 miles (11 km) northeast of Red Oak.

== History ==
Lodi was founded in the early 1880s, after a general store, referred to as "the commissary", was started in the townsite. A short unit of time later, a blacksmith shop was opened. The town featured a factory that was a mixture of a cotton gin, gristmill, and sawmill. A post office was founded for the townsite on March 23, 1894, located in the general store.

Most of the buildings were developed and ran by one family. The buildings were located at the foot of the hills juxtaposed to the town, meant for the valley workers and lumberjacks to have easy access to.

Eventually, a second general store was built close to the top of the hill, with it being given the moniker of "Hidi". A one-room school, named "Big Sandy", was located about 1 mile (1.6 km) southeast of Lodi, with the children who resided in the town attending it. A doctor also resided in the town.

Throughout the entirety of Lodi’s existence, never once did any stage lines, post routes, or trails pass through the town; Lodi was considered a quaint hamlet.

=== Exports ===
Most of Lodi lies between mountain slopes covered with pine trees, and fertile valley soil. Cotton was Lodi’s ultimate export for the valley farmers; it was locally ginned and baled. Pine was also the largest export for the lumberjacks; it was rough sawed at the sawmill.

The exports were hence loaded on carts and wagons yoked with several oxen, thusly being shipped to the aforementioned town of Red Oak. The trip was considered strenuous, with the 7-mile journey taking roughly a 24-hour day to travel to Red Oak’s market.

=== Housing and Population ===
The founding homes of Lodi were built of logs, rock, and mud. Shortly afterwards, frame homes were installed in place of some of the log cabins. Few houses were built, as the town had around the families. One family was noted by John W. Morris as having seventeen children. The population of Lodi never exceeded the 80-90 radius.

== Downfall ==
The town eventually declined in population, with an estimated time of dissolution being around the mid-1950s. The roads leading to the town have been graded and graveled over. The post office was decommissioned on March 15, 1955, roughly six decades after it was founded.

== See also ==
- List of ghost towns in Oklahoma
