= Avery, Oklahoma =

Avery, Oklahoma Êwîheki
- Ghost town
- Location within Oklahoma Location within the United States
- Coordinates: 35°53′2″N 96°45′8″W
- Country: United States
- State: Oklahoma
- County: Lincoln
- Elevation: 971 ft (296 m)
- Time zone: UTC-6 (Central (CST))
  - Summer (DST): UTC-5 (CDT)
- GNIS feature ID: 1089770

Avery (Meskwaki: Êwîheki) is a ghost town in Lincoln County, Oklahoma, United States. The community had a post office from September 16, 1902, until August 26, 1957. Founded as Mound City, it was renamed for Eastern Oklahoma Railway worker Avery Turner after the railroad built through the community.
