= Center, Oklahoma =

- Ghost town
- Location within Oklahoma Location within the United States
- Coordinates: 34°47′57.48″N 96°48′56.16″W
- Country: United States
- State: Oklahoma
- County: Pontotoc
- Elevation: 1,040 ft (317 m)
- Time zone: UTC-6 (Central (CST))
  - Summer (DST): UTC-5 (CDT)
- Area code: 580

Center is a ghost town in Pontotoc County, Oklahoma. A few buildings remain there, including a fire department.

== History ==
Center was established in the mid-1800s as a white establishment in the Chickasaw Nation. They illegally made the town due to the fact that it was under white ownership. Most of the settlers and pioneers of Center inhabited the town via lease or rent of ownership. These people would build stores there.

Around the mid-1890s, Center was a leading town in modern-day Pontotoc County. The town had over 500 people. The main area was built circling two wells. The town had a courthouse, twenty-five stores of fluctuating responsibilities, two hotels, and was what considered as a “leading newspaper” by townsfolk.

In March 1900, the west side of Center was destroyed by a fire. This included the courthouse. No plans were made to fight the fire, and no one could fight a fire this disastrous. When other towns were being built in the Chickasaw nation, people began to move away from Center, leaving it a desolate shell of what it once was.

There is a newer Center that was rebuilt a half-mile south of where it once was.
