= Cold Springs, Oklahoma =

- Ghost town
- Location within Oklahoma Location within the United States
- Coordinates: 34°47′45.24″N 99°0′18.36″W
- Country: United States
- State: Oklahoma
- County: Kiowa
- Established: 1901
- Elevation: 1,430 ft (436 m)
- Time zone: UTC-6 (Central (CST))
  - Summer (DST): UTC-5 (CDT)
- Area code: 580

Cold Springs is a ghost town in Kiowa County, Oklahoma. The town was 5 miles (8.0 km) south of Roosevelt. It is now in the Great Plains State Park, in the Mountain Park Wildlife Management Area Site 2.

== History ==
Cold Springs was established in the valley of Otter Creek a bit after the creation of the Kiowa-Comanche-Apache Indian Reservation by lottery in 1901. The area was fertile, with a surplus of water. It was near the recently built Frisco Railroad.

For a minor amount of time, two towns, North Cold Springs and South Cold Springs, existed adjacent to each other. North Cold Springs stopped existing, and South Cold Springs loaded the depot of its twin town and added it to their town. North Cold Springs was later recognized as a health and recreation area.

A sizable hotel was built, and trains from Hobart brought hundreds of visitors to the town, now seen as a resort of sorts. As of 1915 the town also had a lumberyard, dry goods store, butcher, blacksmith shop, filling station, four general stores, a cotton gin, telephone exchange, and later a cheese factory.

Near South Cold Springs, several granite quarries were built. These quarries would send granite to several parts of the nation. Polishing plants were also opened near Cold Springs, and they would polish some of the granite. The town was never big, despite it being considered a resort town. Cold Springs slowly lost its populace and businesses in the 1930s. Less than 50 people were living in the town by then.
