= Benton, Oklahoma =

- Ghost town
- Country: United States
- State: Oklahoma
- County: Beaver
- Established: 1886
- Time zone: UTC-6 (Central (CST))
  - Summer (DST): UTC-5 (CDT)

Benton is a ghost town in Beaver County, Oklahoma, United States. Nothing remains there. Few photographs of Benton still exist. The community is cited to be historic.

== History ==
Founded around 1886 when its post office was established, and located near the edge of No Man's Land, Benton was known for being a “cultural” town, supposedly a favorite place for gatherings since many people would come there for the hotel and the saloons. The town had a general store, drugstore, hotel, livery stable, two saloons, and a blacksmith shop. A town newspaper called the “Benton County Banner” was established in 1886 or 1888. Most of the homes were built of sod and had wood floors and window sills. The town also had two man-made wells.

Before the panhandle became part of the Oklahoma Territory, local leaders tried to organize it into the Cimarron Territory. They designated Beaver City as the territory's new capital, wrote a constitution, and divided the territory into seven different counties. The one farthest east was to be named “Benton County,” and Benton was going to be the county seat. The Benton County Banner regularly carried the line, “Benton, Gem City of the Neutral Strip. It is sure to become the county seat because it is the exact center of the county.”

== Downfall ==
Accessibility to Benton was made difficult due to the closeness of the Beaver and Kiowa creeks, especially during flood season. The area's soil was more suited for grazing than planting crops. The Panhandle was eventually added to the Oklahoma Territory by the 1890 Organic Act, thus negating the Cimarron Territory scheme and Benton’s chance to be a county seat. That same year, the Benton County Banner moved to Beaver and became the "Beaver City Tribune". The post office was discontinued in 1899. The town declined rapidly; by 1920, no one lived there.
