= Navajoe, Oklahoma =

Ghost Town in Oklahoma, United States

Coordinates: 34.696°N 99.168°W

Navajoe is a ghost town in Jackson County, Oklahoma, United States, located eight miles east and four miles north of Altus at the base of the Navajo Mountains.

Navajo Mountain Range

== Name ==
According to local lore, the town took its name from the nearby Navajo Mountains, where, in the mid-1800s, Comanches annihilated a band of Navajos who were on a raid to steal Comanche horses. In those times, the Comanches and their close allies, the Kiowas, were constantly in conflict with the Navajos, and such long distance raids across the Texas Panhandle by the warring tribes were not uncommon. Quanah Parker, the renowned Comanche chief, gave a detailed account of an essentially identical failed Navajo raid, in 1848 or 1849, against his village on Elk Creek, just north of the mountains. Given that such raid on Quanah's village occurred at the same time and in the same place with the same results, it was quite likely the raid that gave the mountains their name.

== History ==
Town of Navajoe 1887.

In 1886, when the area was still claimed as Greer County, Texas, W.H. Acers and H. P. Dale opened a general store at the site that was to become Navajoe. The location was intended to take advantage of its proximity to the nearby Western Cattle Trail and the Indian Reservation at Fort Sill. In 1887, the town got its start when "Buckskin Joe" Works, a colorful Texas land promoter made his appearance at a Fourth of July picnic attended by area settlers, cowhands and a contingent of Comanche braves led by Quanah Parker. During the festivities, it was agreed to lay out an eighty-acre town site. Buckskin Joe was to receive one-half of the lots in return for his promotion of the town and adjacent area, which he accomplished through his Texas-Oklahoma Colony, the Emigrant Guide and well publicized excursions for prospective settlers.

Also in 1887, the town received a post office designated as "Navajoe" to avoid confusion with Navajo, Arizona. In that same year, a Baptist church was organized, the first Protestant church in what would become Oklahoma Territory. In 1888, Navajoe School opened.

Soon, more than 200 families had settled in and around Navajoe. The town became a trade center for the area's settlers, cowhands and Indians. In addition to the post office, school and churches, it had grocery stores, hardware stores, saloons, a general store, a blacksmith shop, a confectionery, a dry goods store, a wagon yard, a hotel and a cotton gin. To travel from the reservation to the town, the Kiowas rode around the north side of the mountains over the Kiowa Trail, and the Comanches came around the south side over the Comanche Trail.

A typical frontier town, Navajoe had its share of gunfights and outlaw activity. In 1891, a Kiowa uprising, resulting from the killing of one of their chiefs by a cowhand in an argument over beeves, caused area families to seek refuge in the town and a detachment to be dispatched from Fort Sill.

== Today ==
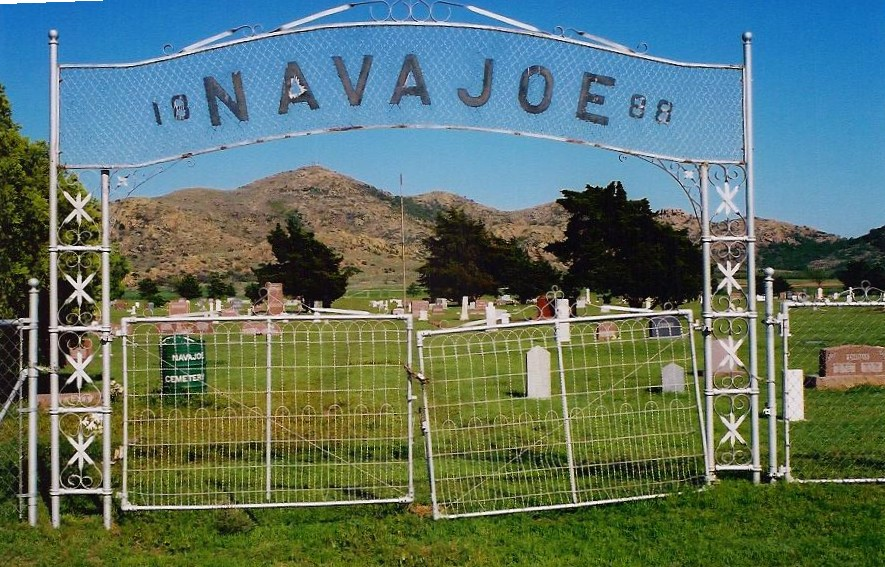
Entrance to Navajoe Cemetery.

But, in 1902, the railroad bypassed Navajoe, and most of the businesses moved, buildings and all, to the new town of Headrick on the railroad. In 1920, Navajoe School was consolidated with Friendship and parts of other nearby school districts. Today, all that remains is a picturesque, well kept cemetery, nestled at the foot of the mountains, which is still used for burials today. A granite monument, erected in its center in 1976, displays a map of the old town and pays tribute to its history.

The name of Navajoe, however, lives on. In 1963, the Friendship and Warren school systems joined to build a new school halfway between the two towns. The new school, which graduated its first class in 1964 and still thrives in northeastern Jackson County, was called Navajo—this time without the addition of an "e" to satisfy the postal authorities.

== See also ==
- List of ghost towns in Oklahoma
