= Skedee, Oklahoma =

- Town
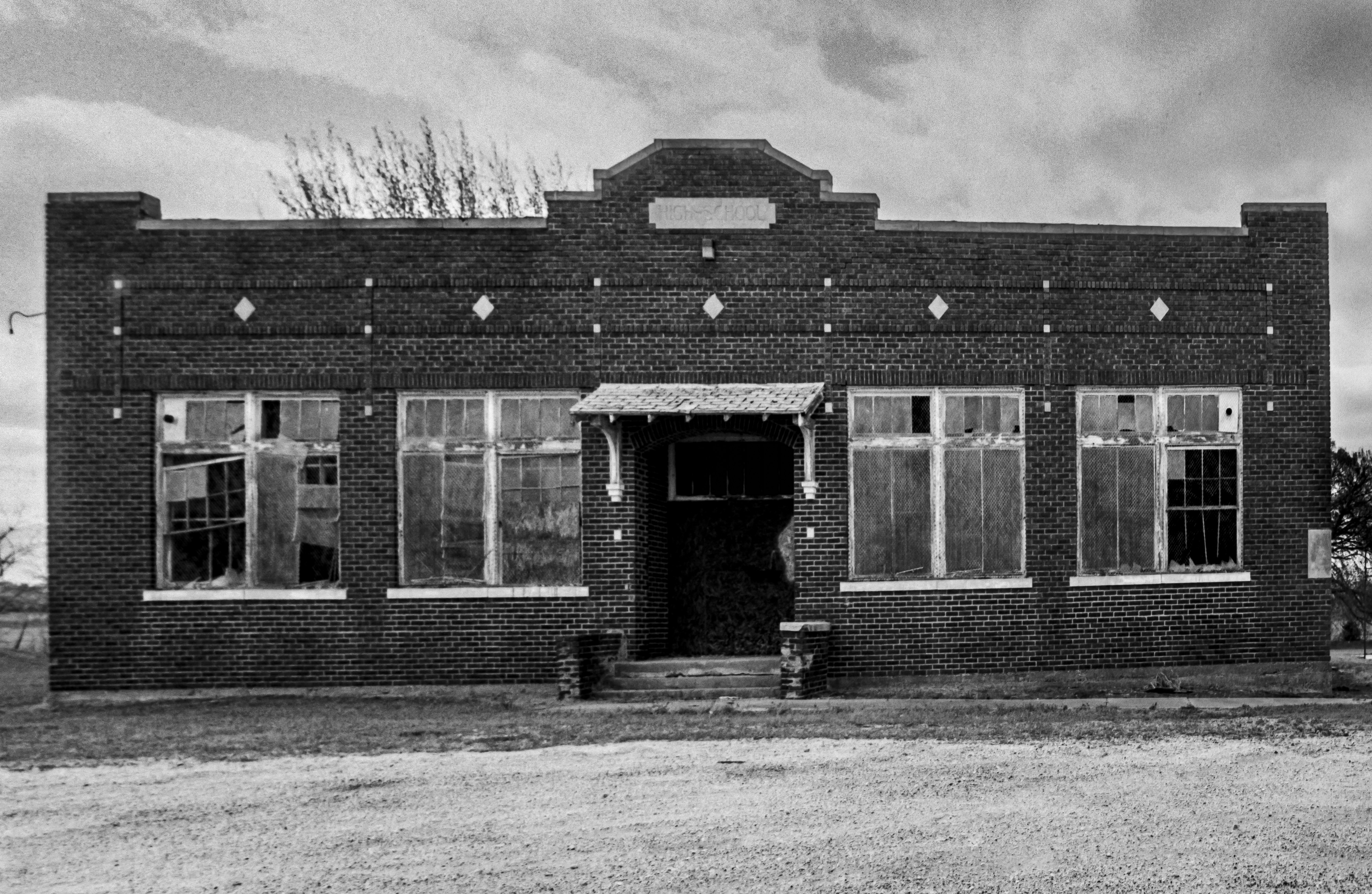

- Location of Skedee, Oklahoma
- Coordinates: 36°22′50″N 96°42′14″W
- Country: United States
- State: Oklahoma
- County: Pawnee

Area
  - Total: 0.14 sq mi (0.35 km^{2})
  - Land: 0.14 sq mi (0.35 km^{2})
  - Water: 0 sq mi (0.00 km^{2})
- Elevation: 830 ft (250 m)

Population (2020)
  - Total: 62
  - Density: 459.5/sq mi (177.42/km^{2})
- Time zone: UTC-6 (Central (CST))
  - Summer (DST): UTC-5 (CDT)
- FIPS code: 40-67800
- GNIS feature ID: 2413292

Skedee is a town in Pawnee County, Oklahoma, United States. Skedee is northwest of Tulsa, northeast of Stillwater, and southeast of Ponca City. The population was 62 at the time of the 2020 Census, a 21.6% increase from the figure of 51 recorded in the 2010 Census.

== History ==
Skedee was known as "Lemert", a name which referred to the local landowners, the Lemert family. In 1902, when the post office opened, the town was renamed "Skedee", after the Skidi Pawnee.

In 1900–1904, the Eastern Oklahoma Railway built a railway line through Skedee. Steam engines stopped at Crystal Creek for water. A cotton gin and a grain elevator were also built.

The rail line was destroyed by flooding in 1957. The Skedee post office later closed in 1963.

In the 21st century, Skedee has become a commuter town, with employed residents commuting to work in Stillwater and Pawnee.

== Points of interest ==
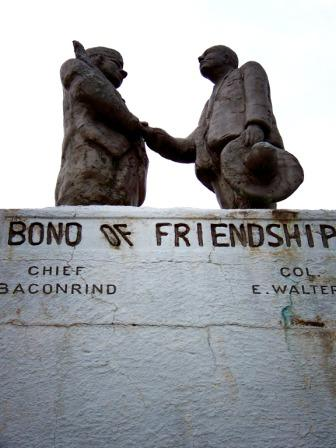
Chief Baconrind Statue in downtown Skedee

A 1926 statue of Osage Chief Bacon Rind and Colonel Ellsworth Walters (1866/7-1946), a Skedee resident who was an oil lease auctioneer for the Osage Nation in the 1920s, stands in the main intersection of the town.

== Geography ==
According to the United States Census Bureau, the town has a total area of 0.1 square miles (0.26 km^{2}), all land.

== Demographics ==
Historical population
| Census | Pop. | Note | %± |
|---|---|---|---|
| 1910 | 289 | | — |
| 1920 | 268 | | −7.3% |
| 1930 | 272 | | 1.5% |
| 1940 | 235 | | −13.6% |
| 1950 | 170 | | −27.7% |
| 1960 | 128 | | −24.7% |
| 1970 | 117 | | −8.6% |
| 1980 | 117 | | 0.0% |
| 1990 | 96 | | −17.9% |
| 2000 | 102 | | 6.3% |
| 2010 | 51 | | −50.0% |
| 2020 | 62 | | 21.6% |
U.S. Decennial Census

=== 2020 census ===
As of the 2020 census, Skedee had a population of 62. The median age was 31.7 years. 30.6% of residents were under the age of 18 and 3.2% of residents were 65 years of age or older. For every 100 females there were 77.1 males, and for every 100 females age 18 and over there were 65.4 males age 18 and over.

0.0% of residents lived in urban areas, while 100.0% lived in rural areas.

There were 25 households in Skedee, of which 36.0% had children under the age of 18 living in them. Of all households, 52.0% were married-couple households, 12.0% were households with a male householder and no spouse or partner present, and 12.0% were households with a female householder and no spouse or partner present. About 4.0% of all households were made up of individuals and 0.0% had someone living alone who was 65 years of age or older.

There were 25 housing units, of which 0.0% were vacant. The homeowner vacancy rate was 0.0% and the rental vacancy rate was 0.0%.

Racial composition as of the 2020 census
| Race | Number | Percent |
|---|---|---|
| White | 47 | 75.8% |
| Black or African American | 0 | 0.0% |
| American Indian and Alaska Native | 6 | 9.7% |
| Asian | 0 | 0.0% |
| Native Hawaiian and Other Pacific Islander | 0 | 0.0% |
| Some other race | 0 | 0.0% |
| Two or more races | 9 | 14.5% |
| Hispanic or Latino (of any race) | 1 | 1.6% |

=== 2000 census ===
As of the census of 2000, there were 102 people, 38 households, and 22 families residing in the town. The population density was 769.1 inhabitants per square mile (297.0/km^{2}). There were 41 housing units at an average density of 309.1 per square mile (119.3/km^{2}). The racial makeup of the town was 96.08% White, 1.96% Native American, and 1.96% from two or more races.

There were 38 households, out of which 39.5% had children under the age of 18 living with them, 55.3% were married couples living together, 2.6% had a female householder with no husband present, and 39.5% were non-families. 34.2% of all households were made up of individuals, and 28.9% had someone living alone who was 65 years of age or older. The average household size was 2.68 and the average family size was 3.61.

In the town, the population was spread out, with 31.4% under the age of 18, 10.8% from 18 to 24, 31.4% from 25 to 44, 12.7% from 45 to 64, and 13.7% who were 65 years of age or older. The median age was 28 years. For every 100 females, there were 100.0 males. For every 100 females age 18 and over, there were 75.0 males.

The median income for a household in the town was $17,188, and the median income for a family was $25,938. Males had a median income of $25,938 versus $11,944 for females. The per capita income for the town was $9,192. There were 24.1% of families and 28.7% of the population living below the poverty line, including 35.5% of under eighteens and 27.8% of those over 64.
