= St. Louis, Oklahoma =

- Town
- Location within the state of Oklahoma
- Coordinates: 35°04′52″N 96°51′35″W
- Country: United States
- State: Oklahoma
- County: Pottawatomie

Area
  - Total: 9.44 sq mi (24.45 km^{2})
  - Land: 9.44 sq mi (24.45 km^{2})
  - Water: 0 sq mi (0.00 km^{2})
- Elevation: 945 ft (288 m)

Population (2020)
  - Total: 121
  - Density: 12.8/sq mi (4.95/km^{2})
- Time zone: UTC-6 (Central (CST))
  - Summer (DST): UTC-5 (CST)
- ZIP code: 74866
- FIPS code: 40-64850
- GNIS feature ID: 2412596

St. Louis is a town in Pottawatomie County, Oklahoma, United States. The population was 121 by the 2020 United States census.

== History ==
St. Louis originally began in 1906 as a community named Simpsonville when J. R. Simpson opened a cotton gin, a gristmill and then a general store. It is unclear when the name of the community was changed to St. Louis. A town plat was not filed until March 9, 1927, and a post office was established in 1928.

Except for a brief oil boom in the 1920s, the town's economy has been based on serving local cotton farmers.

The population peaked at 493 residents in 1930 before declining in subsequent decades. It recovered back to 206 residents in 2000 but has declined more in recent times.

== Geography ==
According to the United States Census Bureau, the town has a total area of 9.4 square miles (24 km^{2}), all land.

St. Louis is located southwest of Seminole on Oklahoma State Highway 59. It is northwest of Lake Konawa.

== Demographics ==
Historical population
| Census | Pop. | Note | %± |
|---|---|---|---|
| 1930 | 493 | | — |
| 1940 | 326 | | −33.9% |
| 1950 | 290 | | −11.0% |
| 1960 | 76 | | −73.8% |
| 1970 | 207 | | 172.4% |
| 1980 | 109 | | −47.3% |
| 1990 | 181 | | 66.1% |
| 2000 | 206 | | 13.8% |
| 2010 | 158 | | −23.3% |
| 2020 | 121 | | −23.4% |
U.S. Decennial Census

=== 2020 census ===
As of the 2020 census, St. Louis had a population of 121. The median age was 47.8 years. 22.3% of residents were under the age of 18 and 27.3% of residents were 65 years of age or older. For every 100 females there were 116.1 males, and for every 100 females age 18 and over there were 88.0 males age 18 and over.

0.0% of residents lived in urban areas, while 100.0% lived in rural areas.

There were 54 households in St. Louis, of which 31.5% had children under the age of 18 living in them. Of all households, 57.4% were married-couple households, 16.7% were households with a male householder and no spouse or partner present, and 20.4% were households with a female householder and no spouse or partner present. About 14.8% of all households were made up of individuals and 13.0% had someone living alone who was 65 years of age or older.

There were 66 housing units, of which 18.2% were vacant. The homeowner vacancy rate was 0.0% and the rental vacancy rate was 12.5%.

Racial composition as of the 2020 census
| Race | Number | Percent |
|---|---|---|
| White | 87 | 71.9% |
| Black or African American | 0 | 0.0% |
| American Indian and Alaska Native | 15 | 12.4% |
| Asian | 1 | 0.8% |
| Native Hawaiian and Other Pacific Islander | 0 | 0.0% |
| Some other race | 0 | 0.0% |
| Two or more races | 18 | 14.9% |
| Hispanic or Latino (of any race) | 2 | 1.7% |

=== 2000 census ===
As of the census of 2000, there were 206 people living in the town, in 82 households. The population density was 21.9 people per square mile (8.5/km^{2}). There were 89 housing units at an average density of 9.5 per square mile (3.7/km^{2}). The racial makeup of the town was 80.58% White, 14.56% Native American, 0.49% Asian, and 4.37% from two or more races. Hispanic or Latino of any race were 5.83% of the population.

There were 82 households, out of which 23.2% had children under the age of 18 living with them, 53.7% were married couples living together, 3.7% had a female householder with no husband present, and 31.7% were non-families. 28.0% of all households were made up of individuals, and 11.0% had someone living alone who was 65 years of age or older. The average household size was 2.51 and the average family size was 3.07.

In the town, the population was spread out, with 24.8% under the age of 18, 8.3% from 18 to 24, 25.2% from 25 to 44, 28.6% from 45 to 64, and 13.1% who were 65 years of age or older. The median age was 39 years. For every 100 females, there were 106.0 males. For every 100 females aged 18 and over, there were 98.7 males.

The median income for a household in the town was $27,857, and the median income for a family was $30,625. Males had a median income of $23,438 versus $20,250 for females. The per capita income for the town was $11,740. About 21.2% of families and 26.4% of the population were below the poverty line, including 47.5% of those under the age of eighteen and none of those 65 or over.

== Education ==
It is in the Konawa Public Schools school district.
