= Keokuk Falls, Oklahoma =

Coordinates: 35°24′18″N 96°38′11″W

Keokuk Falls is a ghost town in Pottawatomie County, Oklahoma. The location is 4.5 miles north and 15 miles east of Shawnee, as well as one mile west of the Creek Nation and one mile north of the Seminole Nation across the North Canadian River. It was named after Chief Moses Keokuk (1821-1908). He is buried in Stroud, Oklahoma's Sac and Fox cemetery.

== History ==
The town had a post office from January 13, 1892 until February 15, 1918. Henry J. Jones was the first postmaster. Mail was sent to Prague after the Post Office closed. The town also had one newspaper, the Keokuk Kall.

It was platted at the opening of the Sac and Fox Reservation on September 22, 1891.

The town became one of the most famous liquor towns in Oklahoma, because it was in the "wet" Oklahoma Territory near the "dry" Indian Territory.

The town became dry at statehood.

== Geography ==
Keokuk Falls were on the North Canadian River, about three feet high. They are no longer visible since the riverbed has shifted.

== See also ==
- Etter, Jim (May 1, 1996). Ghost-Town Tales of Oklahoma: Unforgettable Stories of Nearly Forgotten Places. Stillwater, Oklahoma, United States of America: New Forums Press. pp. 248. ISBN 0-913507-74-1, ISBN 978-0-913507-74-2.
