= Watermelon (disambiguation) =

Watermelon is a plant and its edible fruit.

Watermelon may also refer to:

- Watermelon (Palestinian symbol)
- Watermelon (film), a 2003 British television adaptation of the Marian Keyes novel (see below)
- The Watermelon, a 2008 American film
- "Watermelon" (Eureka Seven), a 2006 television episode
- Watermelon Records, an American record label
- Watermelon Slim (born 1949), American blues musician
- Watermelon stereotype, anti-African American trope
- Watermelon, a 1995 novel by Marian Keyes
- WaterMelon, developer of the video game Pier Solar and the Great Architects
- A pejorative nickname for eco-socialists
- Watermelon (symbol of Kherson)

== See also ==
- Watermelon Creek (disambiguation)
- Watermelon Man (disambiguation)
