= Tar Creek =

Tar Creek may refer to:

- Tar Creek - a stream in Ottawa County, Oklahoma, United States
- Tar Creek - a stream in Santa Clara County, California, United States
- Tar Creek Superfund site
- Tar Creek (film)
