= ASARCO =

American materials company

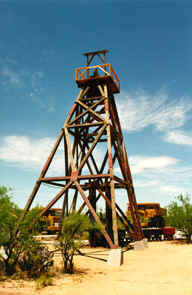
Headframe of an underground mine at the ASARCO Mission Complex near Tucson, Arizona

ASARCO (American Smelting and Refining Company) is a mining, smelting, and refining company based in Tucson, Arizona, which mines and processes primarily copper.

Its three largest open-pit mines are the Mission, Silver Bell and Ray mines in Arizona. Its mines produce 350,000,000 to 400,000,000 pounds (160,000,000 to 180,000,000 kg) of copper a year. ASARCO conducts solvent extraction and electrowinning at the Ray and Silver Bell mines in Pima County, Arizona, and Pinal County, Arizona, and operates a smelter in Hayden, Arizona. ASARCO's smelting plant in El Paso, Texas, was suspended in 1999 and then demolished on April 13, 2013. Before closing, the plant produced 1,000,000,000 pounds (450,000,000 kg) of anodes each year. Refining at the mines as well as at a copper refinery in Amarillo, Texas, produce 375,000,000 pounds (170,000,000 kg) of refined copper each year.

ASARCO's hourly workers are primarily represented by the United Steelworkers.

ASARCO has 20 superfund sites across the United States, and it is subject to considerable litigation over pollution. After emerging from bankruptcy in 2008, it made a settlement with the government of $1.79 billion for contamination at various sites; the funds were allotted to the Environmental Protection Agency (EPA) for cleanup at 26 sites around the country.

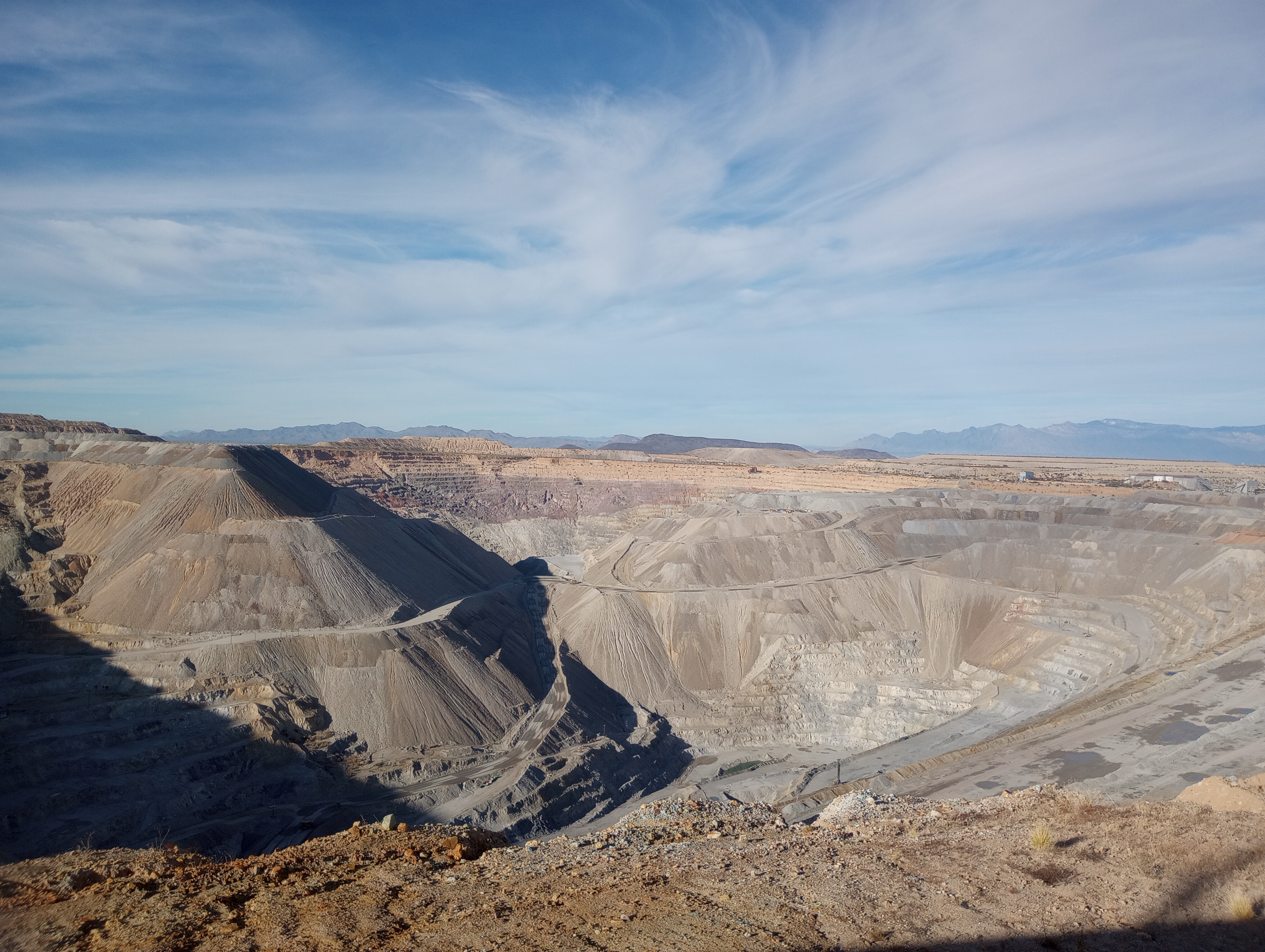
Open pit mine at the ASACRO Mission Complex outside Tucson, Arizona.

== History ==
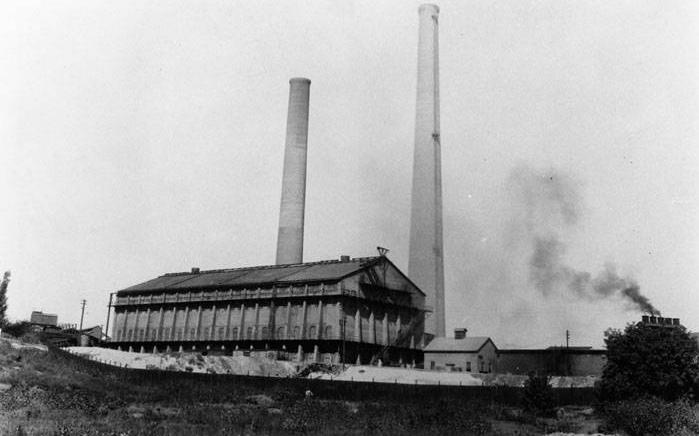
ASARCO lead smelter in Murray, Utah; January 1, 1922

ASARCO was founded in 1888 as the American Smelting and Refining Company by Henry H. Rogers, William Rockefeller, Adolph Lewisohn, Robert S. Towne, Anton Eilers, and Leonard Lewisohn.

In April 1901, the Guggenheim family gained control of the company, and in 1905, bought the Tacoma smelter from the Bunker Hill Mining Company. ASARCO eventually controlled 90% of the U.S. lead production, essentially becoming a smelter trust.

Based in Tucson, Arizona, the company grew to conduct mining, smelting, and refining of primarily copper. Open-pit mining is primarily utilized as the most efficient method of recovering this metal; the company's three largest such works are the Mission, Silver Bell, and the Ray mines in Arizona. The company had also operated in silver mining in Idaho. Its mines produce 350,000,000 to 400,000,000 pounds (160,000,000 to 180,000,000 kg) of copper a year. ASARCO conducts solvent extraction and electrowinning at the Ray and Silver Bell mines in Pima County, Arizona, and Pinal County, Arizona, and operates a smelter in Hayden, Arizona. It also had a smelting plant in El Paso, Texas, operations of which have since been suspended.

Chemetco, once one of the U.S.'s major secondary copper smelters, maintained a critical commercial relationship with ASARCO through the supply of unrefined copper anodes produced at its Hartford, Illinois facility. According to a 2003 United States International Trade Commission report, Chemetco regularly shipped semi-refined anodes by rail to ASARCO’s Amarillo, Texas, refinery for final electrolytic purification into 99.99% copper cathode. The closure of Chemetco in 2001 caused ASARCO to significantly curtail production at its Amarillo facility, which had an annual refining capacity of 290,000 metric tons, due to the sudden loss of this essential feedstock. The 290,000 metric tons figure refers to the Amarillo refinery’s total annual refining capacity, not the volume of feedstock previously supplied to ASARCO.

From 1901 to 1959, American Smelting and Refining was included in the Dow Jones Industrial Average. In 1975 it officially changed its name to ASARCO Incorporated. In 1999 it was acquired by Grupo México. On August 9, 2005, the company filed for Chapter 11 bankruptcy in Corpus Christi, Texas under then-president Daniel Tellechea.

As of 2019, ASARCO operates two primary locations in the United States, a mining and smelting complex in Arizona and a copper refinery in Amarillo, Texas.

== Pollution and environmental issues ==
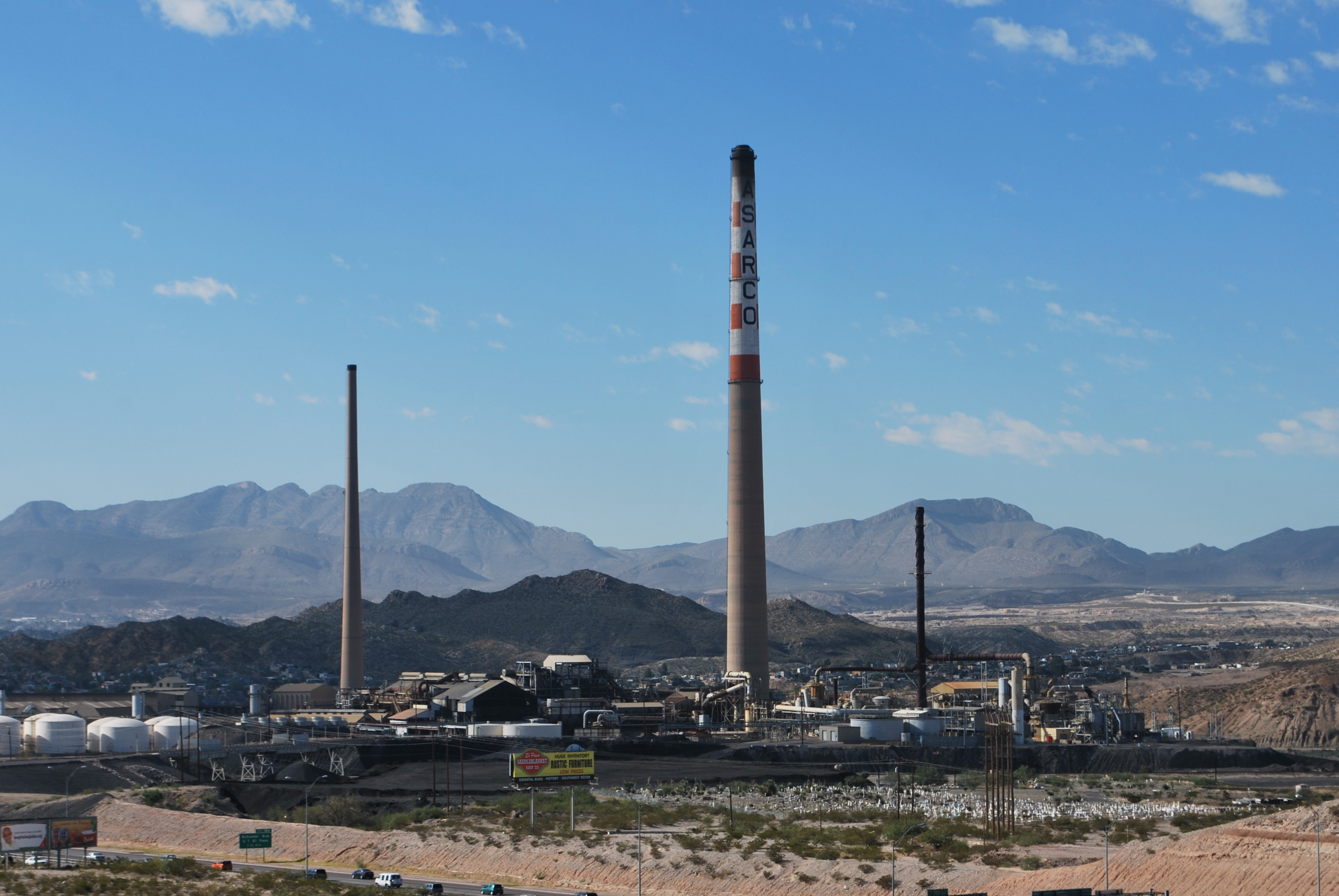
These tall smokestacks at ASARCO's El Paso Smeltertown site were demolished in 2013.

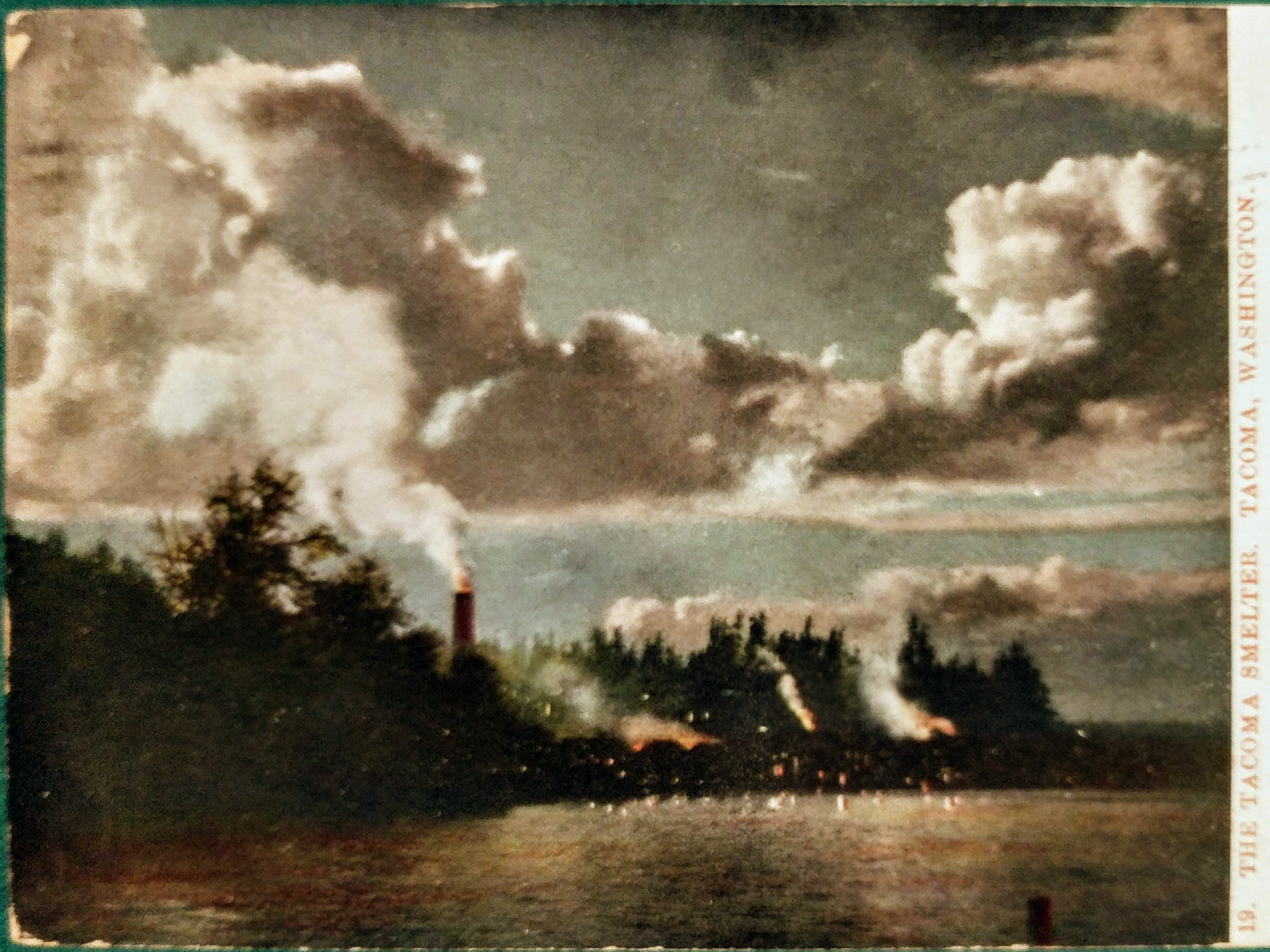
A 1909 postcard image of Tacoma with its ASARCO smelter smokestack

ASARCO has been found responsible for environmental pollution at 20 Superfund sites across the U.S. by the Environmental Protection Agency. Among those sites are:

1. American Smelting and Refining Co., located in Omaha, Nebraska. Plant disassembled, remediation completed and site reused.
2. Interstate Lead Company, or ILCO, labeled EPA Site ALD041906173, and located in Leeds, Jefferson County, Alabama
3. Argo Smelter, Omaha & Grant Smelter, labeled EPA Site COD002259588, and located at Vasquez Boulevard and I-70 in Denver, Colorado
4. "Smeltertown", El Paso County, Texas, where the copper plant's furnaces were illegally used to dispose of hazardous waste. The plant has since been dismantled.
5. California Gulch mine and river systems in Leadville, Colorado;
6. Summitville Consolidated Mining Corp., Inc. (SCMCI), now bankrupt, EPA Site COD983778432, in Del Norte, Rio Grande County, Colorado;
7. ASARCO Globe Plant, EPA Site COD007063530, Globeville, near South Platte River, Denver and Adams County, Colorado;
8. Bunker Hill Mining and Metallurgical, Coeur d'Alene River Basin, Idaho;
9. Kin-Buc Landfill in New Jersey;
10. Tar Creek (Ottawa County) lead and zinc operations and surrounding residences in Oklahoma;
11. Commencement Bay, Near Shore/Tide Flats smelter, groundwater, and residences in Tacoma and Ruston, Washington.
12. Everett Smelter, Everett, Washington.
13. Murray, Utah lead smelter operation, since reclaimed as part of EPA Superfund program and now the location of the Intermountain Medical Center.

== Litigation history ==
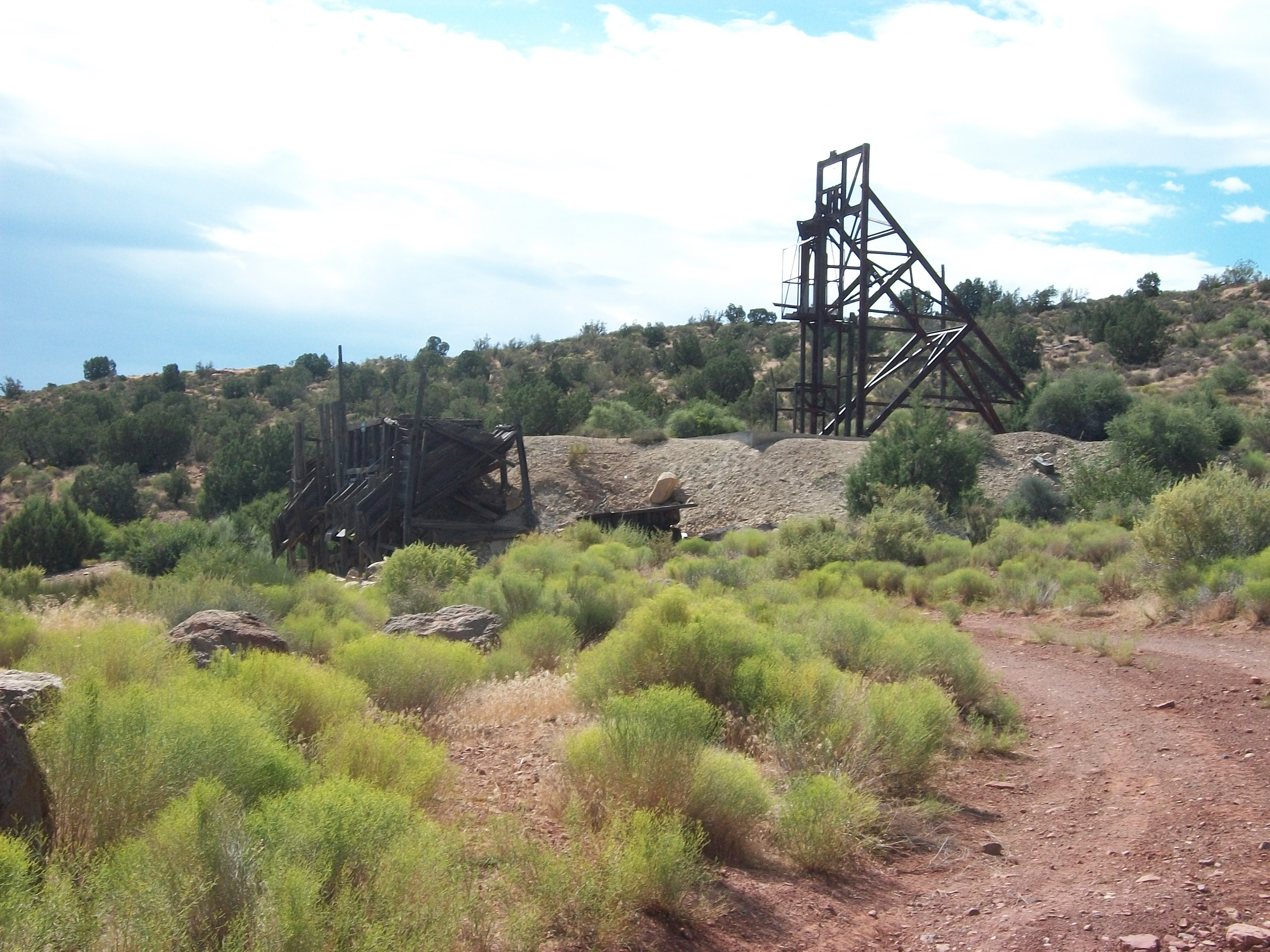
ASARCO mine in Silver Reef, Utah

After the Colorado Department of Public Health and Environment sued ASARCO for damages to natural resources in 1983, the EPA placed the ASARCO Globe Plant on its National Priorities List of Superfund sites, with ASARCO to pay for the site's cleanup.

In 1972 ASARCO's downtown Omaha plant in Nebraska was found to be releasing high amounts of lead into the air and ground surrounding the plant. In 1995 ASARCO submitted a demolition and site cleanup plan to the Nebraska Department of Environmental Quality for their impact on the local residential area. Fined $3.6 million in 1996 for discharging lead and other pollutants into the Missouri River, ASARCO closed its Omaha plant in July 1997. After extensive site cleanup, the land was turned over to the City of Omaha as a 23-acre (93,000 m^{2}) park. All of East Omaha, comprising more than 8,000 acres (32 km^{2}), was declared a Superfund site. As of 2003, 290 acres (1.2 km^{2}) had been cleaned.

In 1991 the Coeur d'Alene Tribe filed suit under CERCLA against Hecla Mining Company, ASARCO and other defendants for damages and cleanup costs downstream of what has been designated as the Bunker Hill Mine and Smelting Complex Superfund site. Contamination had affected Lake Coeur d'Alene and the Saint Joe River, as well as related waters and lands, and cleanup had been under way since the early 1980s. In 1996 the United States joined the suit. In 2008 after emerging from bankruptcy, ASARCO LLC settled for $452 million for contributions to this site. This was part of a nearly $2 billion settlement (see below) with the US for a total of 26 sites.

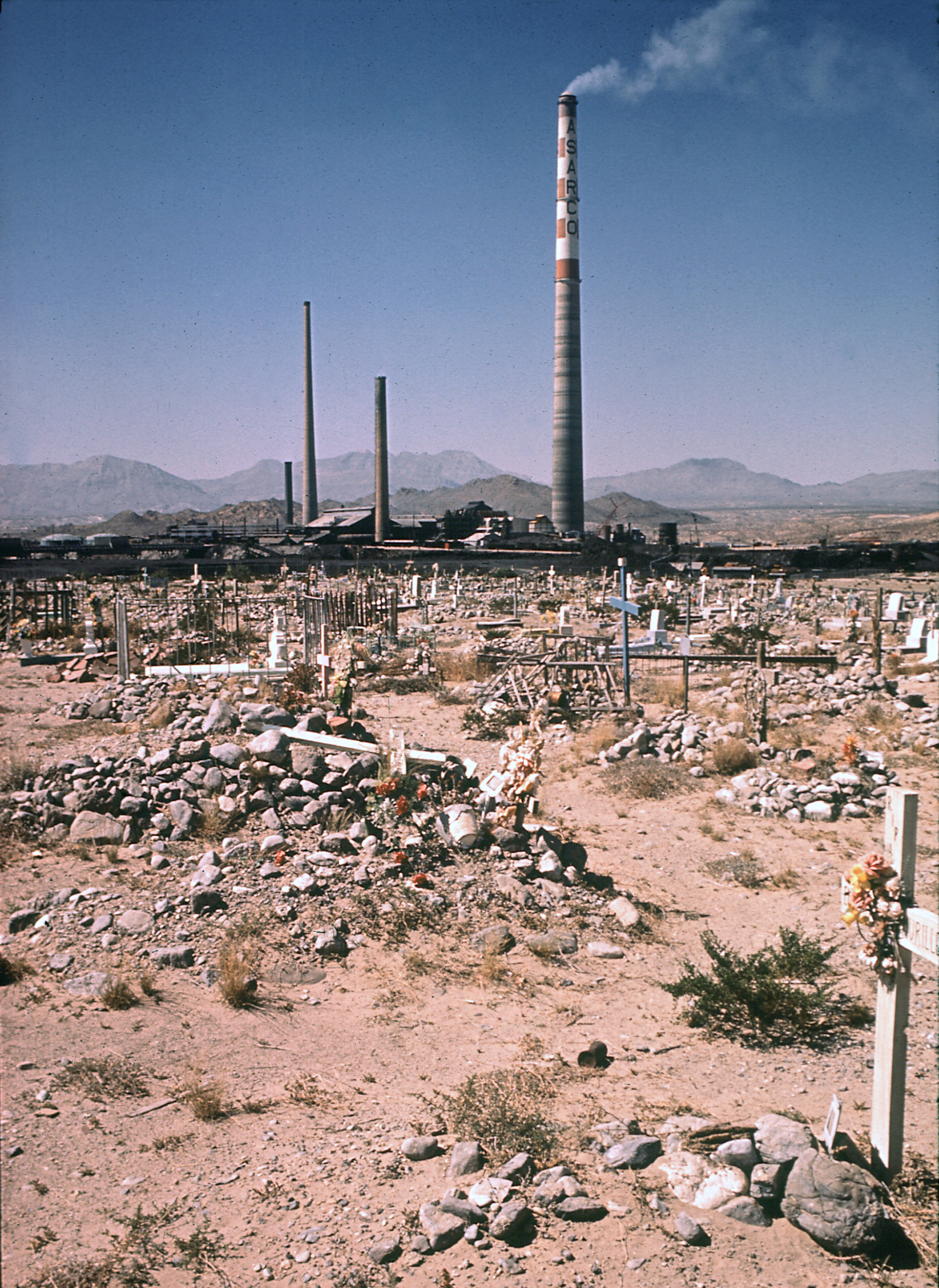
The ASARCO smelter in El Paso, operating in 1972, viewed across the Smeltertown cemetery

In 2007, the Environmental Protection Agency released the results of soil and air tests in Hayden, Arizona, taken adjacent to the ASARCO Hayden Smelter. The results showed abnormally high amounts of pollutants that violate prescribed health standards. Arsenic, lead and copper were among the most egregious pollutants found in Hayden. As a consequence of the contamination, the EPA proposed to add Hayden, Arizona, to the list of Federal Superfund sites. This action would provide funding to clean up the contamination. ASARCO fought the action, supported by Democratic Gov. Janet Napolitano, who said: "I am asking that the EPA delay final decision on listing until March 31, 2008. This would provide ample time for the EPA, in close coordination with ADEQ, to enter an agreement with ASARCO to conduct remedial actions..." After emerging from Chapter 11 bankruptcy in 2008, ASARCO made a settlement with the government of $1.79 billion for contamination at various sites; the funds were allotted to the Environmental Protection Agency (EPA) for cleanup at 26 sites around the country. A final settlement for $1.79 billion was made in 2009 for up 80 sites, including one of the most notorious, the smelting plant at El Paso, Texas, for which cleanup was set to start in 2010.

== Documentary ==
ASARCO's Tar Creek Superfund site was the subject of the film documentary Tar Creek (2009), made by Matt Myers. At one time, Tar Creek was considered to be the worst environmental problem on the EPA's list of more than 1200 sites.

== See also ==
- 1913 El Paso smelters' strike
- List of Superfund sites in Alabama
- List of Superfund sites in Colorado
- List of Superfund sites in Illinois
- List of Superfund sites in Oklahoma
- Picher, Oklahoma
- Francis H. Brownell
