= Frank Koester =

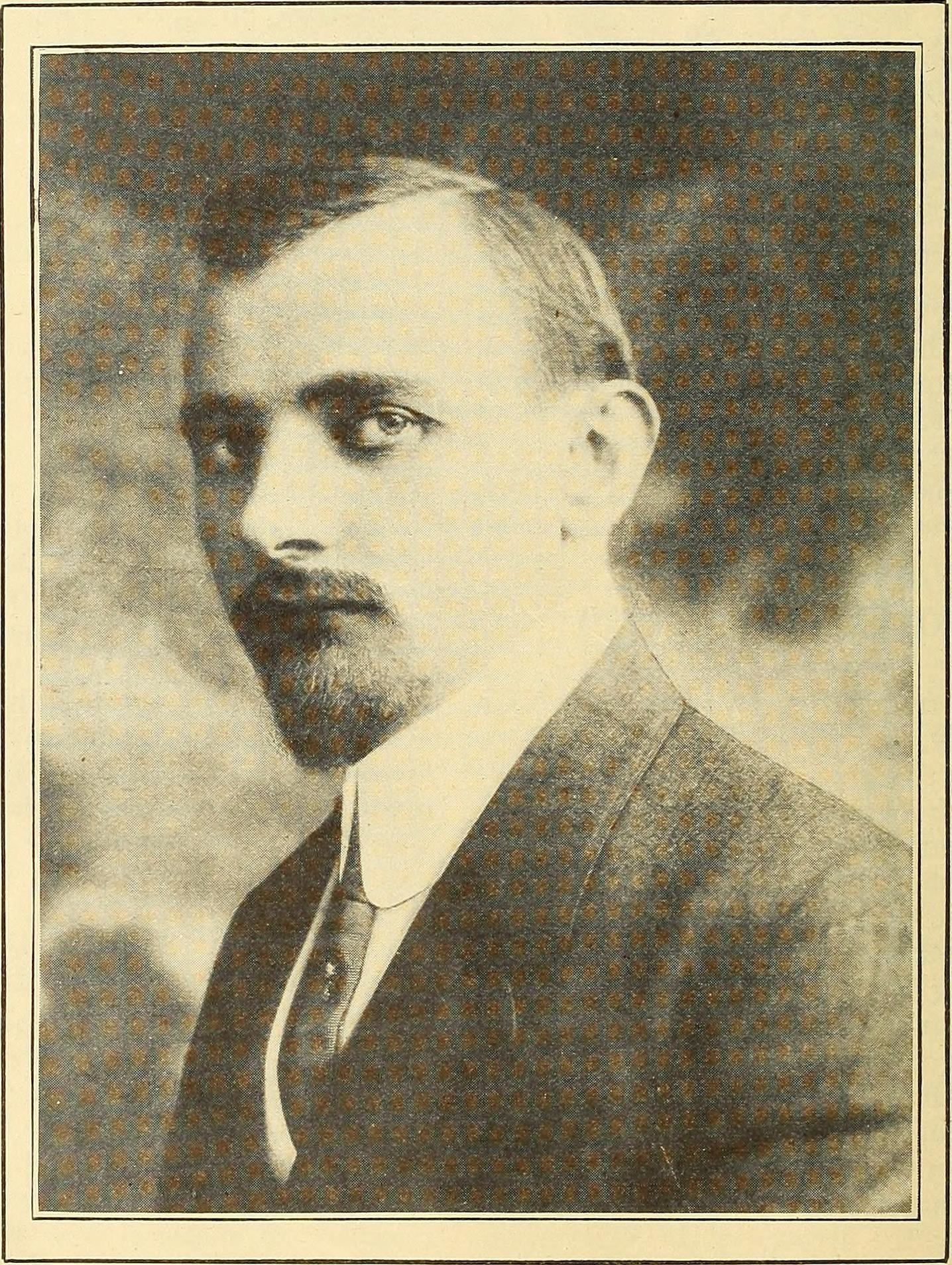
- Born: Franz Köster; 28 August 1876; Sterkrade (Kingdom of Prussia)
- Died: 1927 (aged 50–51); New York City (United States)
- Occupations: Author, electrical engineer, urban planner

Frank Koester, born Franz Köster (28 August 1876, Sterkrade, Germany - 5 October 1927, New York City) was a German-American engineer and author.

== Biography ==
He received ten years of theoretical training, with practical engineering and municipal experience in Germany, including four years of shop and field practice. After winning a gold medal for electrical engineering at the Exposition Universelle (1900), he came to the United States in 1902 and became a naturalized citizen in 1911. He was connected with the construction of the New York City Subway and other large engineering undertakings in the United States, South America, Alaska and the Philippines. Among his employers were the Guggenheim Exploration Company and the American Smelting and Refining Company A considerable part of his practice has been devoted to the design, construction and operation of power stations.

Recognizing the great potential in city planning, he made a special study of modern methods in this field, taking city planning courses at Charlottenburg College in Germany. He was a delegate to the City Planning Congress at Düsseldorf, Germany, in 1912, and to the International Congress of City Planning and City Maintenance held at Ghent, Belgium, in 1913, where he made an address; "Cooperation of Engineer and Architect in City Planning". He also did contract work in civil engineering, street lighting and urban planning. Among his clients were the Pennsylvania cities of Allentown, Bethlehem and Scranton.

== Works ==
- Steam Electric Power Plants (New York and London, 1908)
- Hydro-electric Developments and Engineering (New York and London, 1909)
- The Price of Inefficiency (New York, 1913)
- Electricity for the Farm and Home (New York, 1913)
- Modern City Planning and Maintenance (New York and London, 1914)
- Secrets of German Progress (New York, 1915)
- Under the Desert Stars (speculative fiction) (New York, 1923)

== Sources ==
- "Koester, American City Planning". library.cornell.edu. Archived from the original on March 13, 2015. Biographical introduction and an electronic version of Koester's article "American City Planning". The American Architect. 102: 141–146. October 23, 1912.
