= Watermelon Creek =

Watermelon Creek may refer to:

- Watermelon Creek (Georgia)
- Watermelon Creek (Anderson County, South Carolina)
