= Francis Brownell =

Francis Brownell may refer to:

- Francis E. Brownell (1840–1894), Union Army soldier, a Medal of Honor recipient for his actions during the American Civil War
- Francis H. Brownell (1867–1954), businessman, lawyer, and Washington state pioneer
