= Climate change in Oklahoma =

Climate change in the US state of Oklahoma

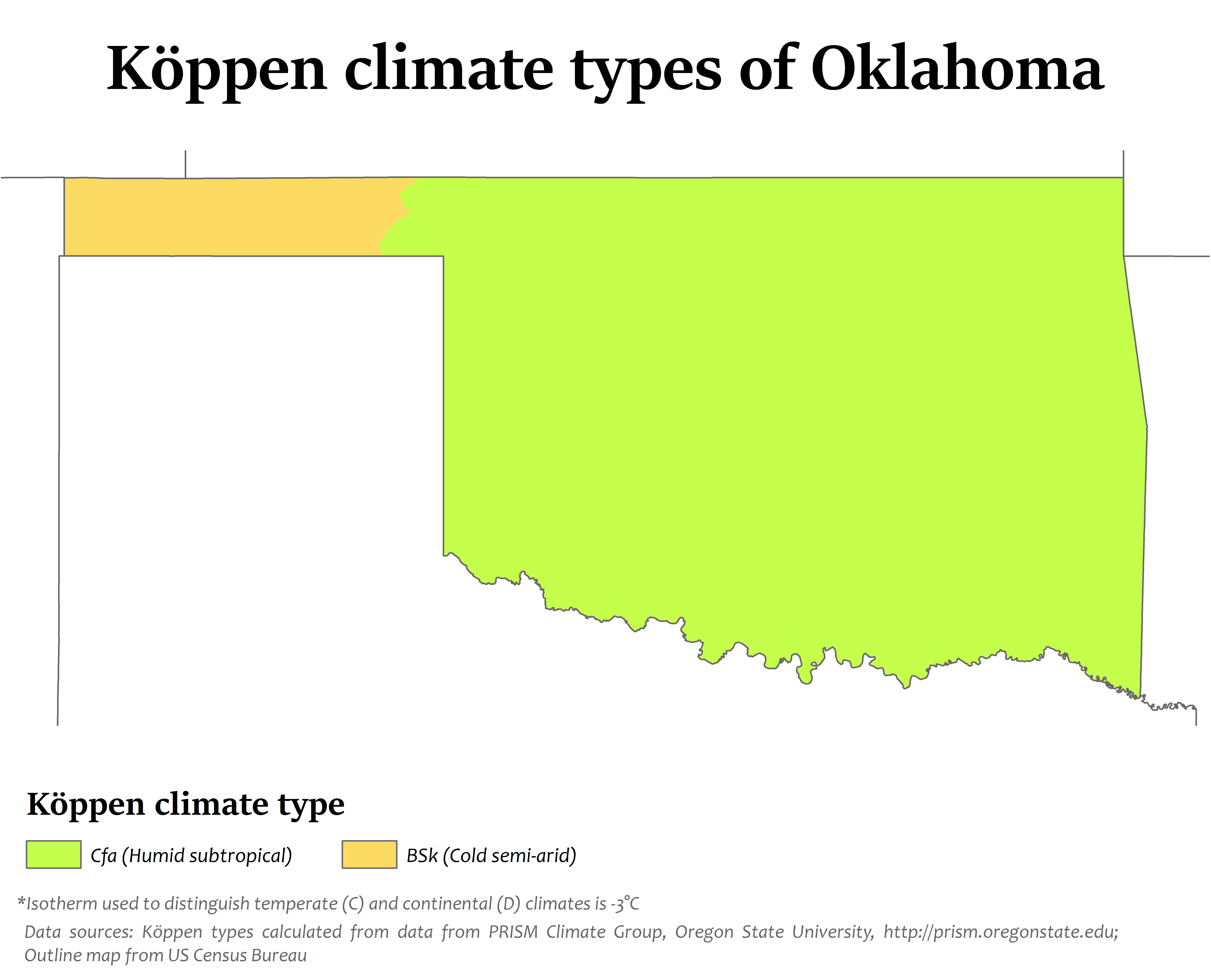
Köppen climate types in Oklahoma showing most of the state to now be humid subtropical.

Regions of the High Plains Aquifer System where the water level has declined in the period 1980-1995 are shown in yellow and red.

Climate change in Oklahoma encompasses the effects of climate change, attributed to man-made increases in atmospheric carbon dioxide, in the U.S. state of Oklahoma.

The United States Environmental Protection Agency has noted: "In the coming decades, Oklahoma will become warmer, and both floods and droughts may be more severe. Most of Oklahoma did not become warmer during the last 50 to 100 years. But soils have become drier, annual rainfall has increased, and more rain occurs in heavy downpours. In the coming decades, summers are likely to be increasingly hot and dry, which will reduce the productivity of farms and ranches, change parts of the landscape, and possibly harm human health".

It has also been noted that Oklahoma's grasslands "are a vital component in nature's fight against climate change" due to their capacity to capture and store carbon.

== Politics of climate change in Oklahoma ==
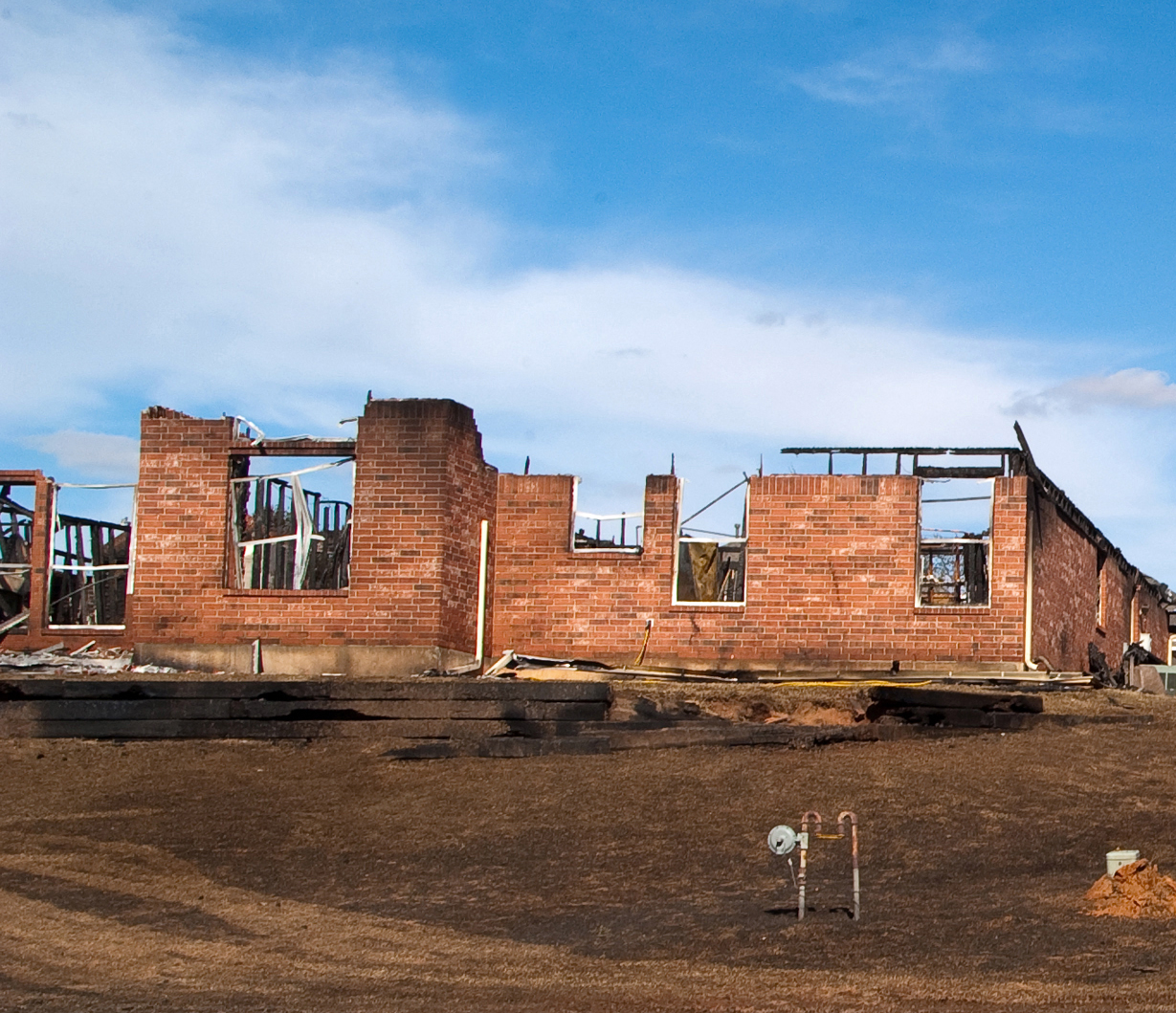
Wildfire destruction, Midwest City

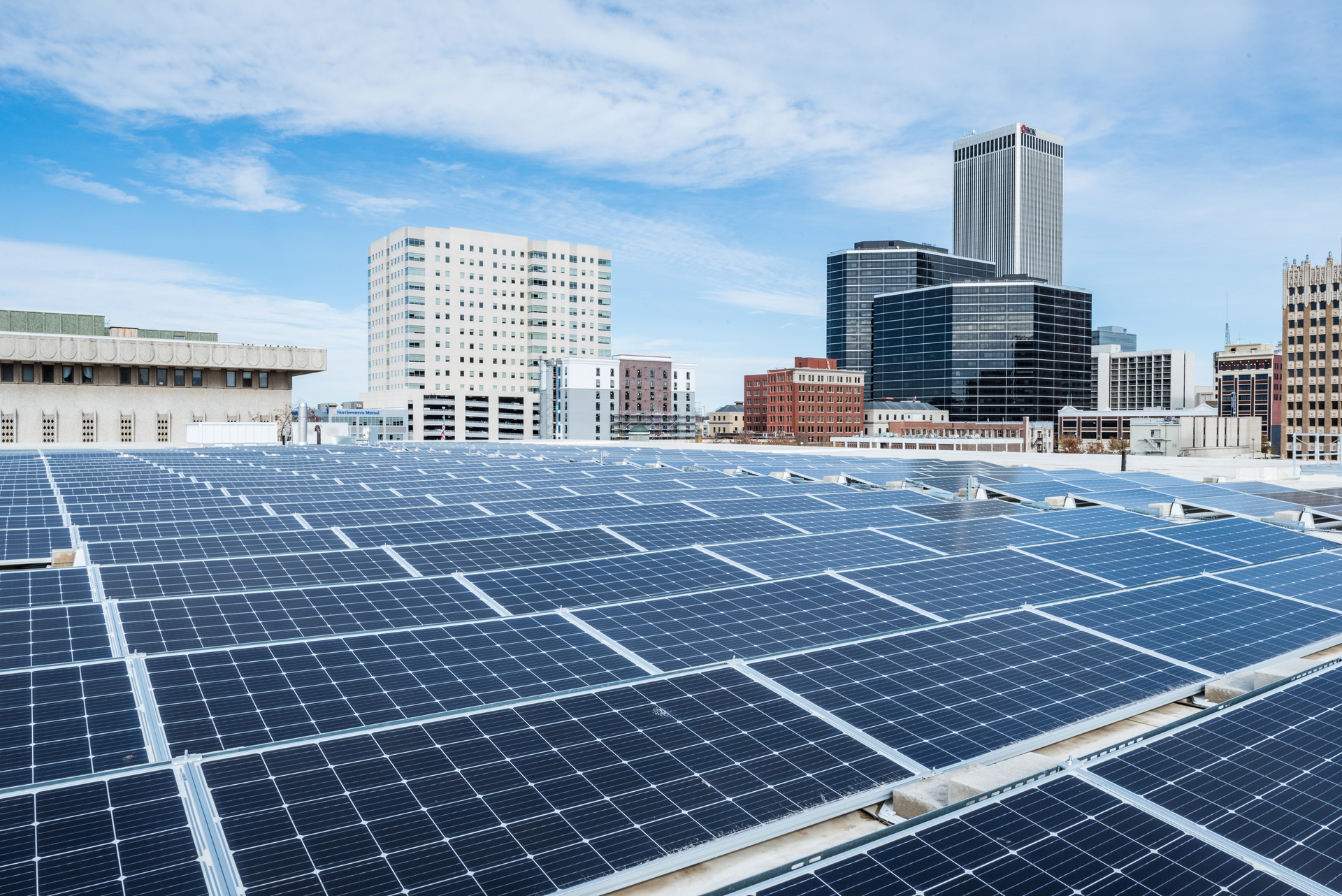
Solar panels, Tulsa Central Library

Discussions of climate change in Oklahoma have been described as "subtle", as Oklahoma is a highly conservative and religious state, where the oil and gas industry plays a leading role in the economy.

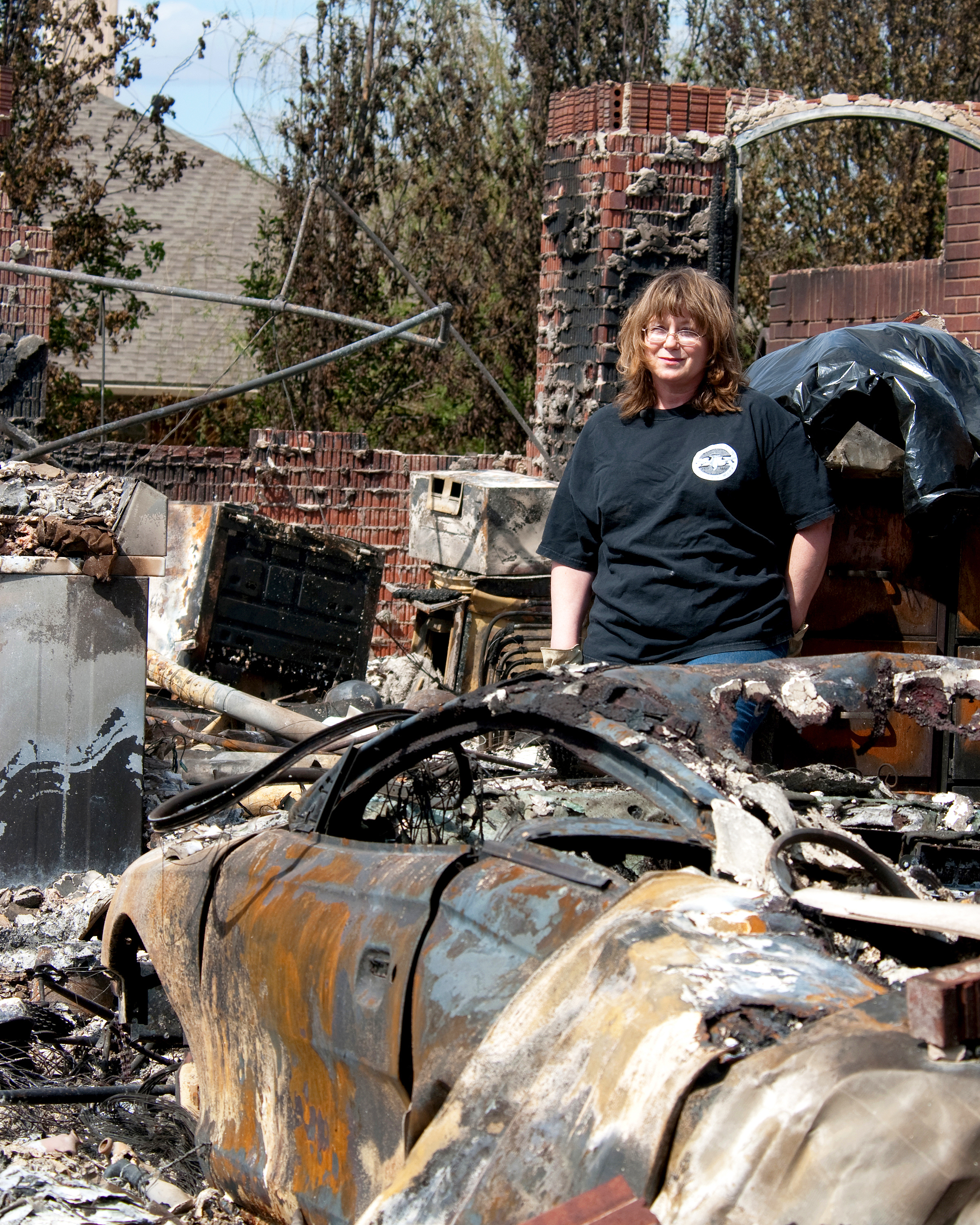
Burned-down house after wildfire, Midwest City, 2009

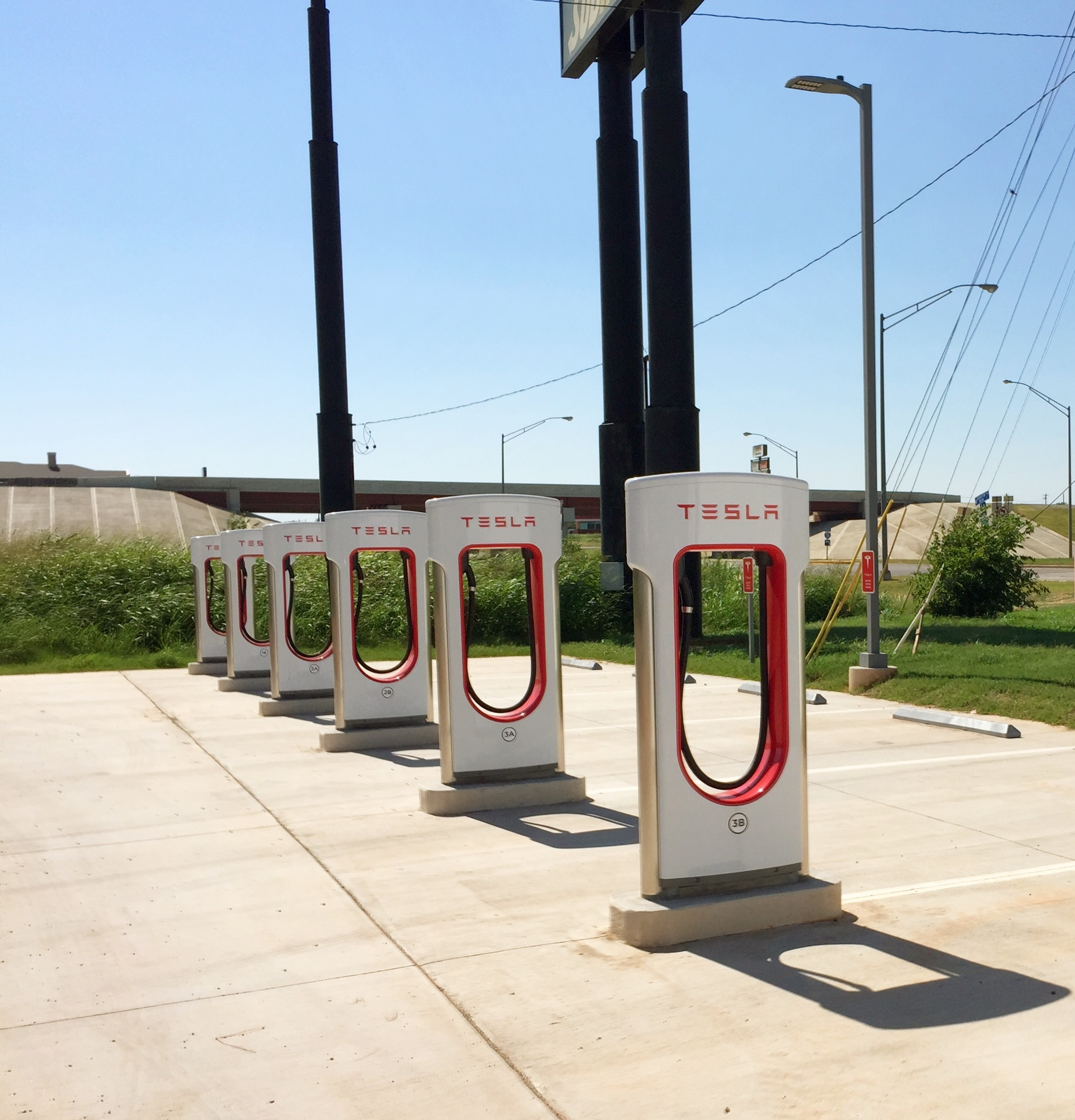
Tesla Supercharger station, Perry

In 2015, surveys identified Woodward County, Oklahoma as one of the most climate skeptical counties in the United States.

Oklahoma is home to Senator Jim Inhofe, who served from 1994 to 2023 and is known for throwing a snowball in the US Senate in 2015 "in an effort to disprove what he sees as alarmist conclusions about man-made climate change," and to politician and climate skeptic Jim Bridenstine. Bridenstine modified his positions on climate upon becoming NASA administrator in 2018. Former Oklahoma attorney general Scott Pruitt, who has been closely allied with the fossil fuel industry, served as Environmental Protection Agency Administrator from 2017 to 2018.

Flooding is a major concern in the state, especially in the wake of unusually heavy rains. Cities such as Tulsa are responding with flood control efforts in preparation for extreme weather events, without using the term climate change.

Despite current debates on appropriate terminology, when viewed from a historical rather than a political perspective, it is clear that the climate of Oklahoma has changed considerably since the dust storms of the 1930s, which occurred after years of drought and poor farming practices. Online course resources have been assembled by a NASA, NSF and NOAA-supported program, "The Earth System Science Education Alliance (ESSEA)" under the title "Dust Bowl: Is Climate Change Starting Another?," enabling students to assess the history of the 1930s Dust Bowl from a 21st-century perspective of computers and space-based data collection.

== Precipitation and water resources ==
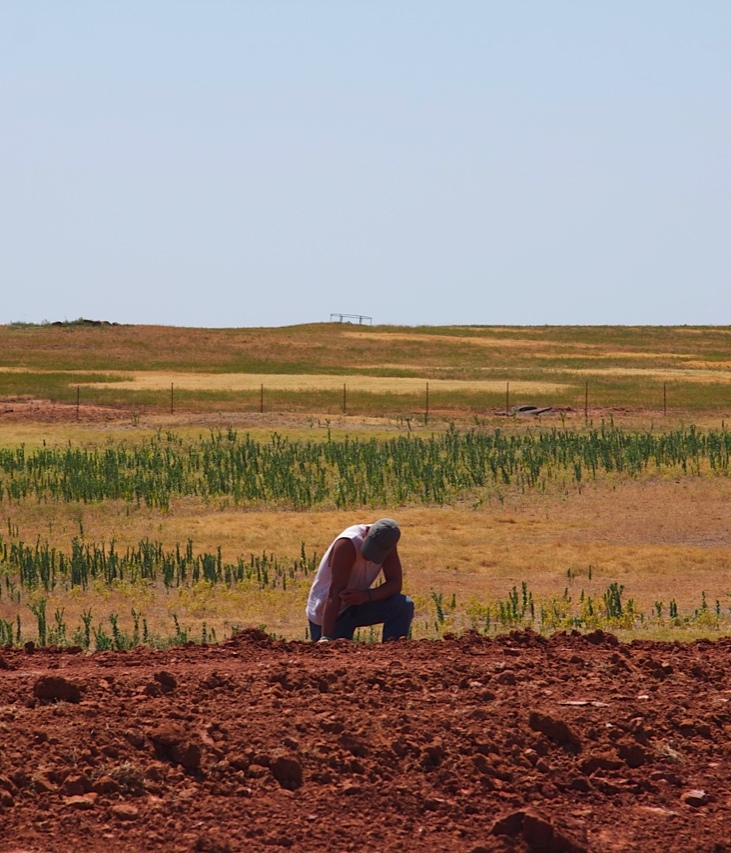
Parched ground, 2011

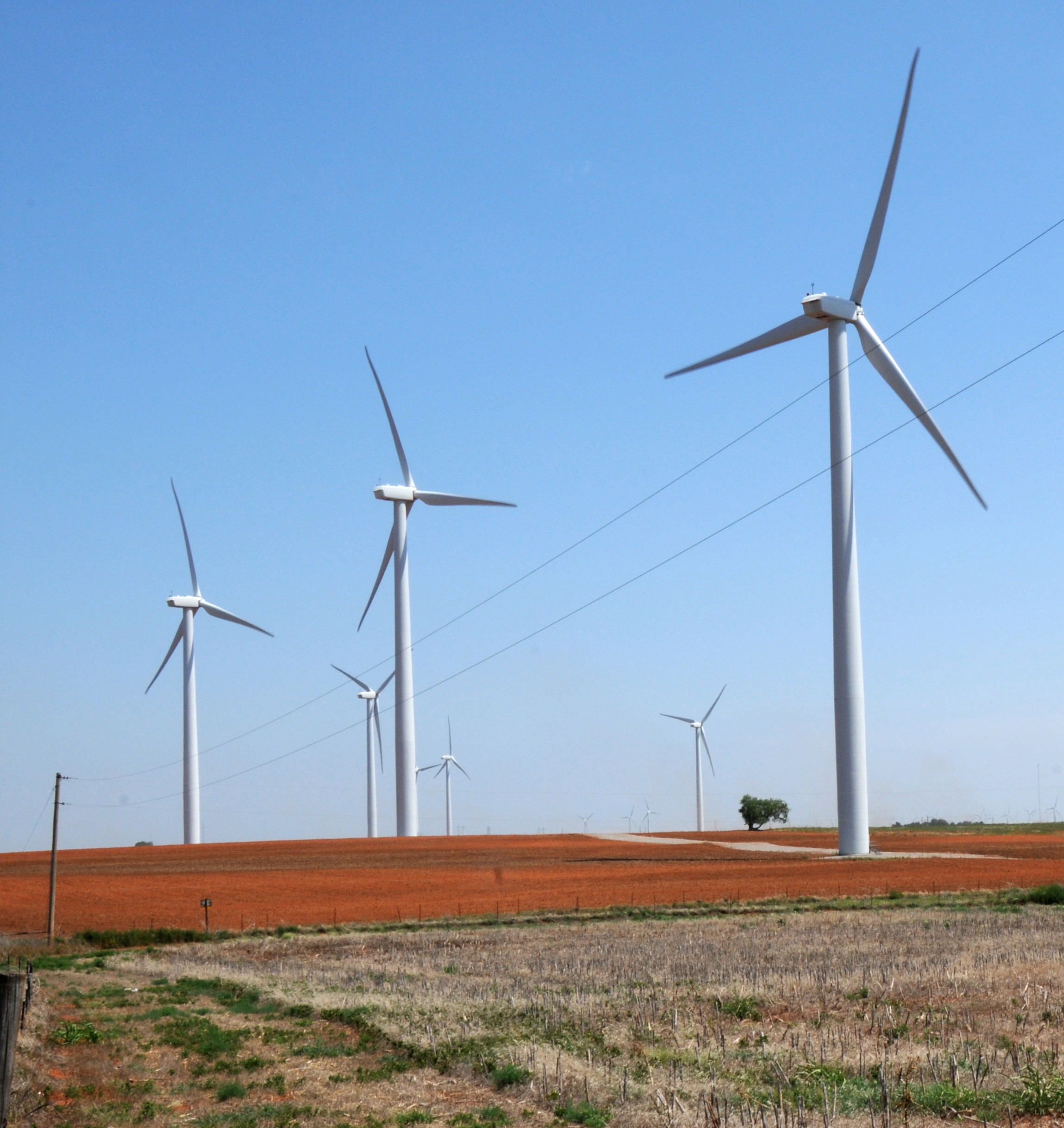
Wind turbines

Oklahoma's Water by 2060 plan calls for Oklahoma to use "no more fresh water in 2060 than was used in 2012."

"Changing the climate is likely to increase the demand for water but make it less available. As rising temperatures increase evaporation and water use by plants, soils are likely to become even drier. Average rainfall is likely to decrease during spring and summer. Seventy years from now, the longest period without rain each year is likely to be at least three days longer than it is today. Increased evaporation and decreased rainfall are likely to reduce the average flow of rivers and streams".

"Decreased river flows can create problems for navigation, recreation, public water supplies, and electric power generation. Commercial navigation can be suspended during droughts when there is too little water to keep channels deep enough for barge traffic. Decreased river flows can also lower the water level in lakes and reservoirs, which may limit municipal water supplies; impair swimming, fishing, and other recreational activities; and reduce hydroelectric power generation. Conventional power plants also need adequate water for cooling. Compounding the challenges for electric utilities, rising temperatures are expected to increase the demand for electricity for air conditioning".

"Although summer droughts are likely to become more severe, floods may also intensify. During the last 50 years, the amount of rain falling during the wettest four days of the year has increased about 15 percent in the Great Plains. Over the next several decades, the amount of rainfall during the wettest days of the year is likely to continue to increase, which would increase flooding".

According to Kevin Kloesel, director of the Oklahoma Climatological Survey, Oklahoma had "one record cold" in the 30 years leading up to 2019, and "14 different days at record highs" since 2000. Kloesel anticipates that "precipitation changes will amplify these warming extremes, as Oklahoma appears poised for more frequent, lengthier periods of drought interspersed with floods."

NPR notes that nearly one third of the dams in Oklahoma, over 1,400 in all, are approaching the end of their projected operational life, and that the increased intensity of flooding may exacerbate the chances of dam breaks with damaging consequences for populated areas.

== Agriculture ==
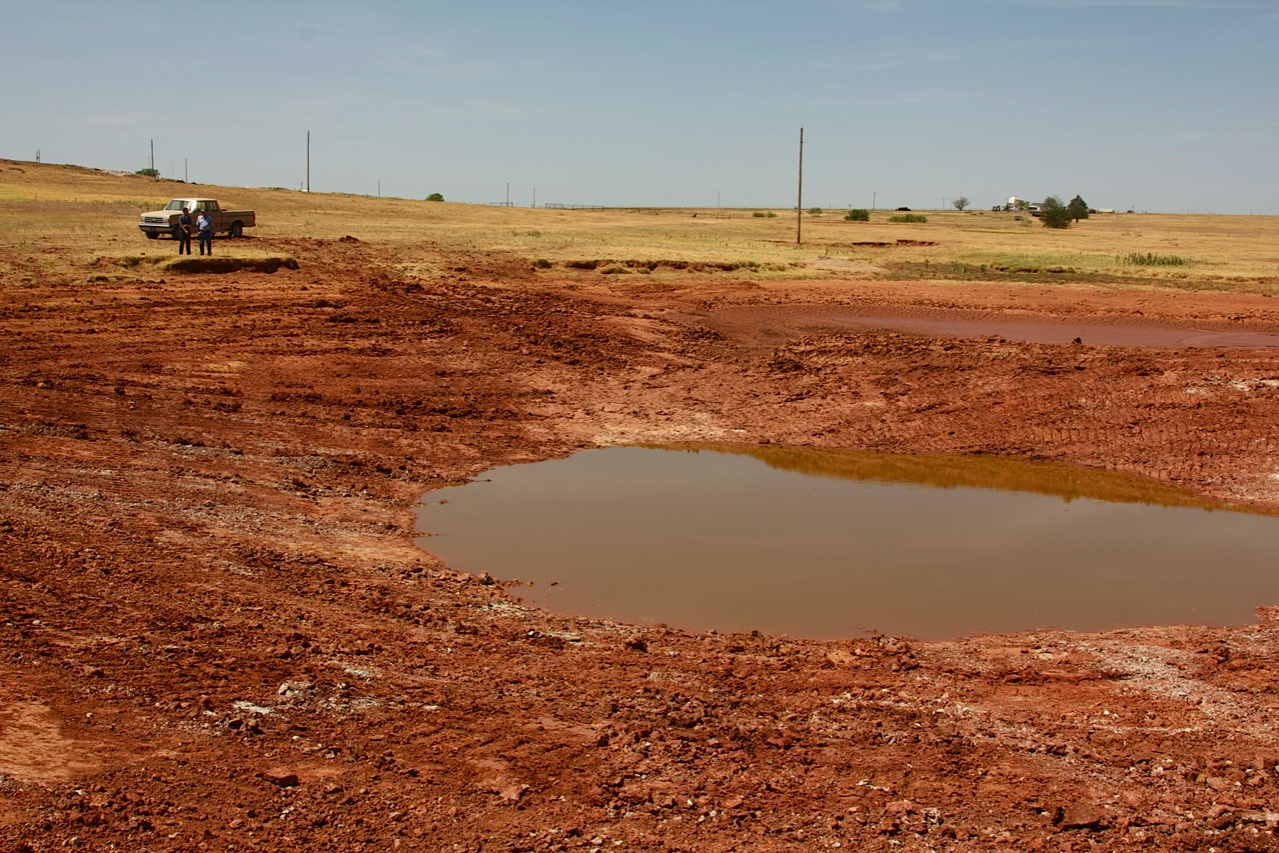
Dry lake, 2011

"Hot days can be unhealthy—even dangerous. Seventy years from now, Oklahoma is likely to have three to four times as many days above 100°F as it has today". The arid climate that typifies the American West is expected to continue expanding to the east, reducing the crops that can be grown by Oklahoma farmer.

During droughts, cattle are often left with less nutritious forage, adding to the challenge brought about by the limited availability of feed during droughts. This increases operating costs for ranchers, reducing profits as ranchers take on additional expenses for supplemental feed or sell cattle before they have reached maturity. For instance, due to the high prices of hay and dried-up water sources, many ranchers in Oklahoma were compelled to liquidate their herds during the severe drought period in 2011, further contributing to the losses that were recorded in both livestock and crop production.

Drilling water wells contributed to declining groundwater levels. This contribution further exacerbates an already historical trend of depletion within the Oklahoma region, particularly within the arid panhandle region, where agriculture heavily relies on the Ogallala Aquifer. Spiking temperatures and extended droughts have increased the demand for water from crops and livestock. As a result, farmers are seeing their costs rise as they drill deeper wells to reach dwindling water reserves, and switch to less water-demanding crops such as milo at the expense of profitability. All these challenges are compounded by weak Oklahoma legislative regulations on water, which allow industries such as commercial hog operations to withdraw immense volumes of groundwater and thereby accelerate aquifer depletions. Groundwater levels are decreasing, and Oklahoma's agricultural productivity and economic stability are at a risk, underscoring the urgent need for sustainable water management in the face of a warming, drier climate.

== Oklahoma's Potential in Carbon Removal ==
Oklahoma possesses several factors that position it as a favorable location for carbon removal initiatives. The state has a rich history of technological project development and deployment, particularly in industries like oil and gas. This background provides Oklahoma with essential expertise and infrastructure that can be leveraged for carbon removal projects. Moreover, the state has vast geologic capacity and experience in safely storing carbon dioxide deep underground. In June 2022, Oklahoma took the first step towards making it easier for businesses to apply for carbon sequestration permits on a state level, instead of with the US federal government. Bill 200 was signed by Oklahomas 28th Governor, Kevin Stitt, that, according to House of Representatives Energy Chair and House bill sponsor Brad Boles, will earn a carbon sequestration delegation from the Environmental Protection Agency (EPA).

=== Economic Opportunities and Industry Growth ===
The carbon removal industry presents significant economic opportunities for Oklahoma. With estimates projecting a trillion-dollar market by 2050, the state can capitalize on its resources, skilled workforce, and industrial project development experience to drive innovation and create jobs. Energy companies in Oklahoma, such as Devon Energy, have relevant expertise in well drilling and subsurface geology, essential for carbon storage initiatives.

=== Academic and Research Institutions ===
Oklahoma is home to universities with programs relevant to carbon removal. Institutions like Oklahoma State University, the University of Oklahoma, and the University of Tulsa contribute to the state's research and development capabilities. Their contributions range from exploring carbon removal techniques to improving soil health and increasing crop yields through carbon dioxide removal.

=== Government Support and Funding ===
To maximize Oklahoma's potential as a leader in carbon removal, collaboration between the state's elected representatives, the federal government, and industry experts is crucial. Philip-Michael Weiner, a Tulsa resident and founding partner at Recapture, a tech-agnostic utility-scale carbon project developer, has emphasized the importance of government support in realizing Oklahoma's carbon removal goals. Weiner suggests that government initiatives should focus on providing research, development, and demonstration funding to accelerate the growth of the carbon removal sector. Congressional representatives like Congressman Frank Lucas and Congresswoman Stephanie Bice, who serve on the House Committee on Science, Space and Technology, play a vital role in advocating for Oklahoma's position as a leader in carbon dioxide removal.

== Wildfires, tornadoes, and landscape change ==
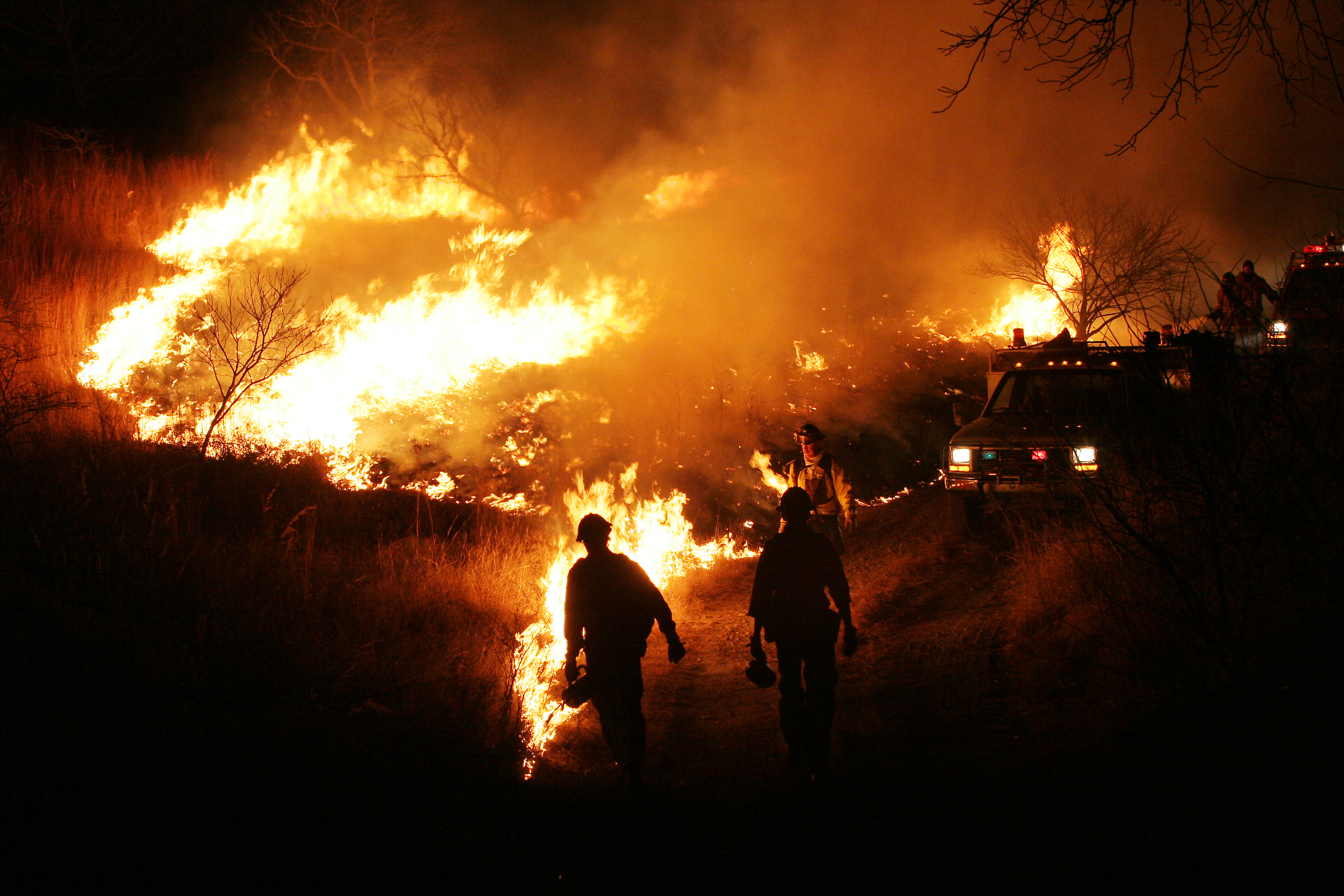
Wildfire, Springer, 2006

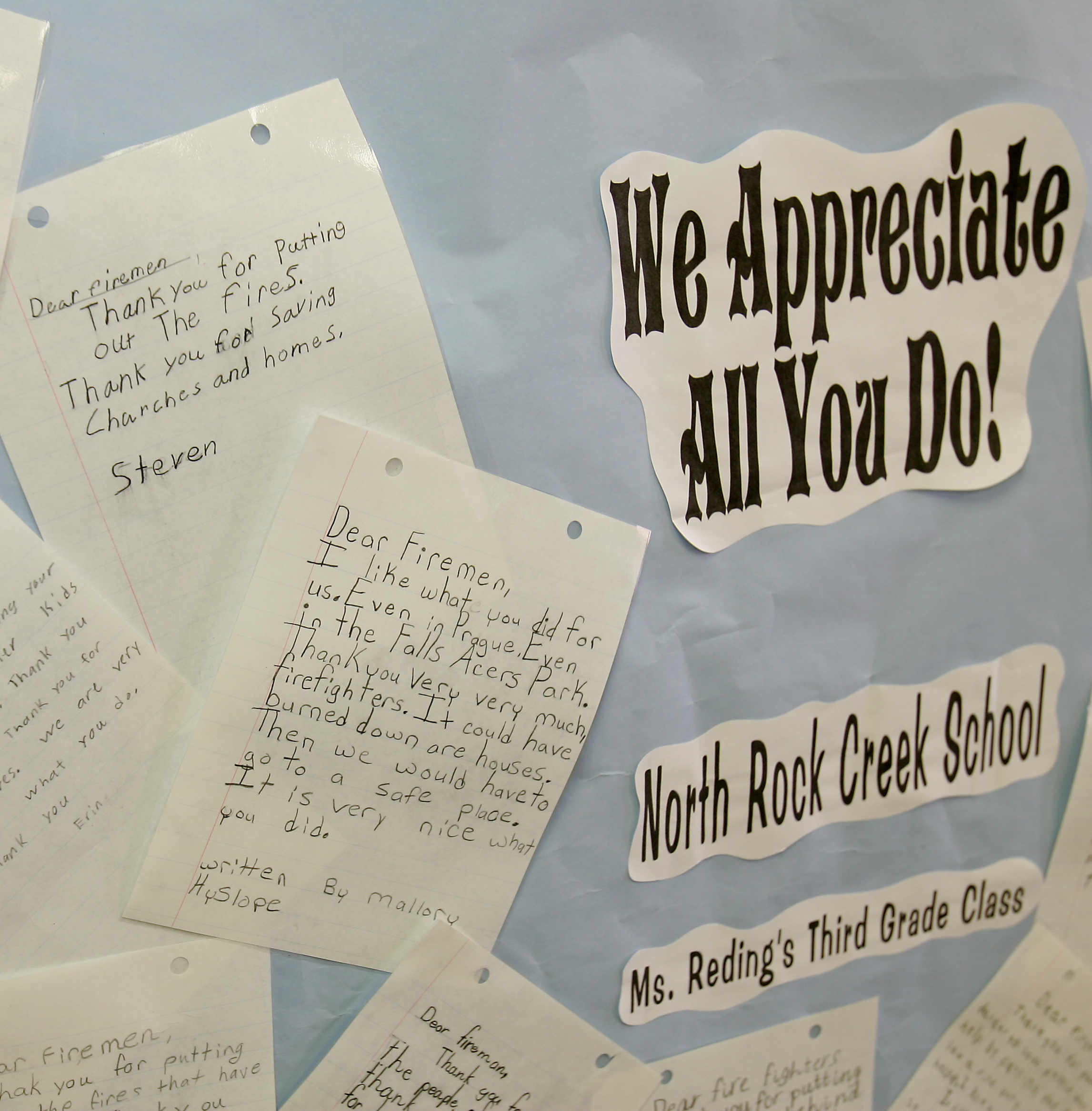
Third grade class thanking firefighters, Shawnee, 2006

"Higher temperatures and drought are likely to increase the severity, frequency, and extent of wildfires, which could harm property, livelihoods, and human health. On average, more than 1 percent of the land in Oklahoma has burned each decade since 1984. Wildfire smoke pollutes the air and can increase medical visits for chest pains, respiratory problems, and heart problems".

"The combination of more fires and drier conditions may change parts of Oklahoma’s landscape. Many plants and animals living in the dry lands of western Oklahoma are already near the limits of what they can tolerate. In some cases, native vegetation may persist as the climate changes. But when fire destroys the natural cover, the native grasses and woody plants may be replaced by non-native grasses, which can become established more readily after a fire. Because non-native grasses are generally more prone to intense fires, native plants may be unable to re-establish themselves.

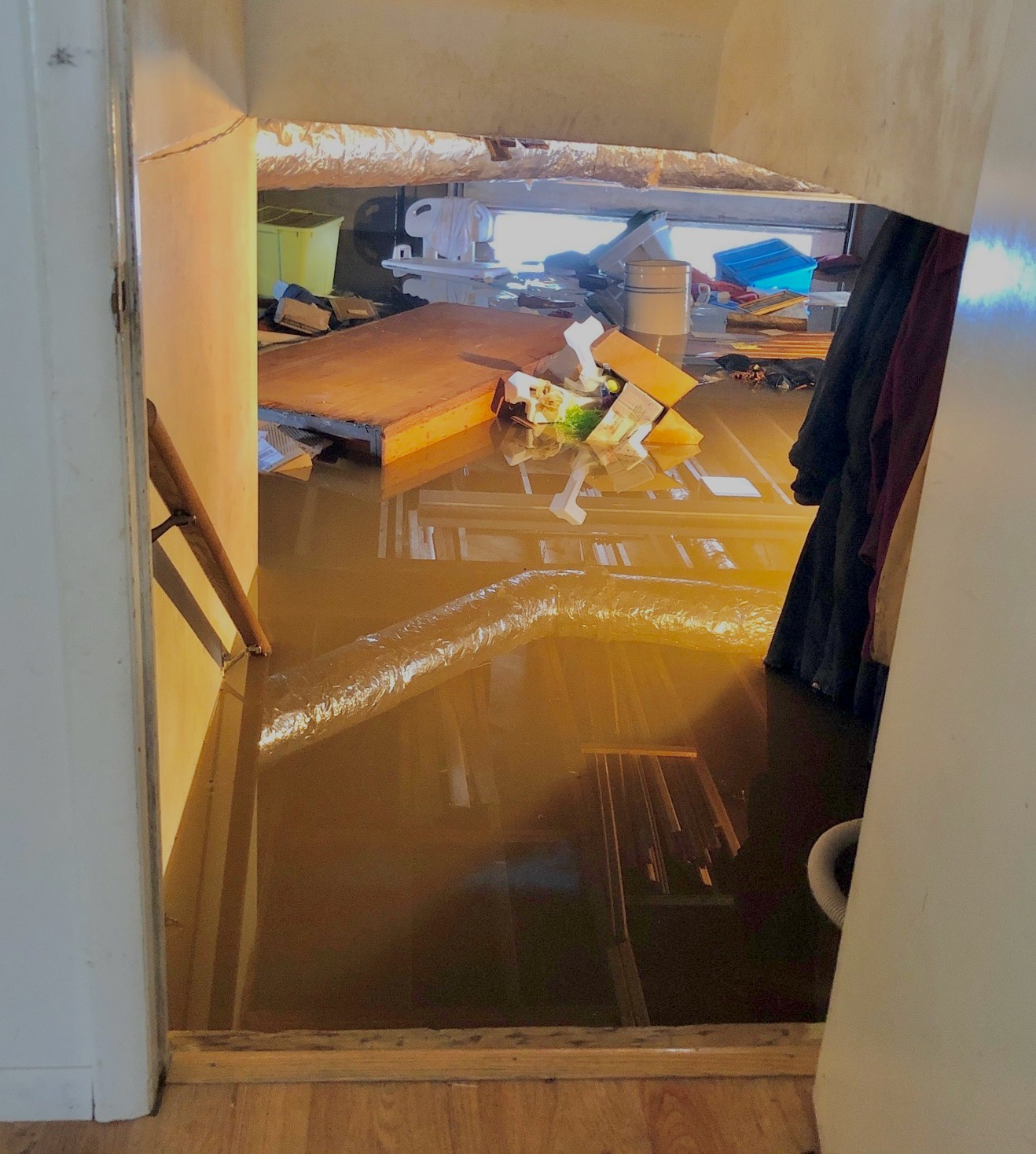
Basement flooded in Tulsa, 2019

"Scientists do not know how the frequency and severity of tornadoes will change. Rising concentrations of greenhouse gases tend to increase humidity, and thus atmospheric instability, which would encourage tornadoes. But wind shear is likely to decrease, which would discourage tornadoes. Research is ongoing to learn whether tornadoes will be more or less frequent in the future. Because Oklahoma experiences about 60 tornadoes a year, such research is closely followed by meteorologists in the state".

=== Prairie conservation and carbon capture ===
Ranchers, environmentalists and Osage Nation landowners are working together to preserve Oklahoma's prairie at the Joseph H. Williams Tallgrass Prairie Preserve.

Each acre of protected grasslands in Oklahoma "mitigates nearly four metric tons of carbon dioxide per year — the equivalent of taking 4 million cars off the road."

== Standards for climate change education ==
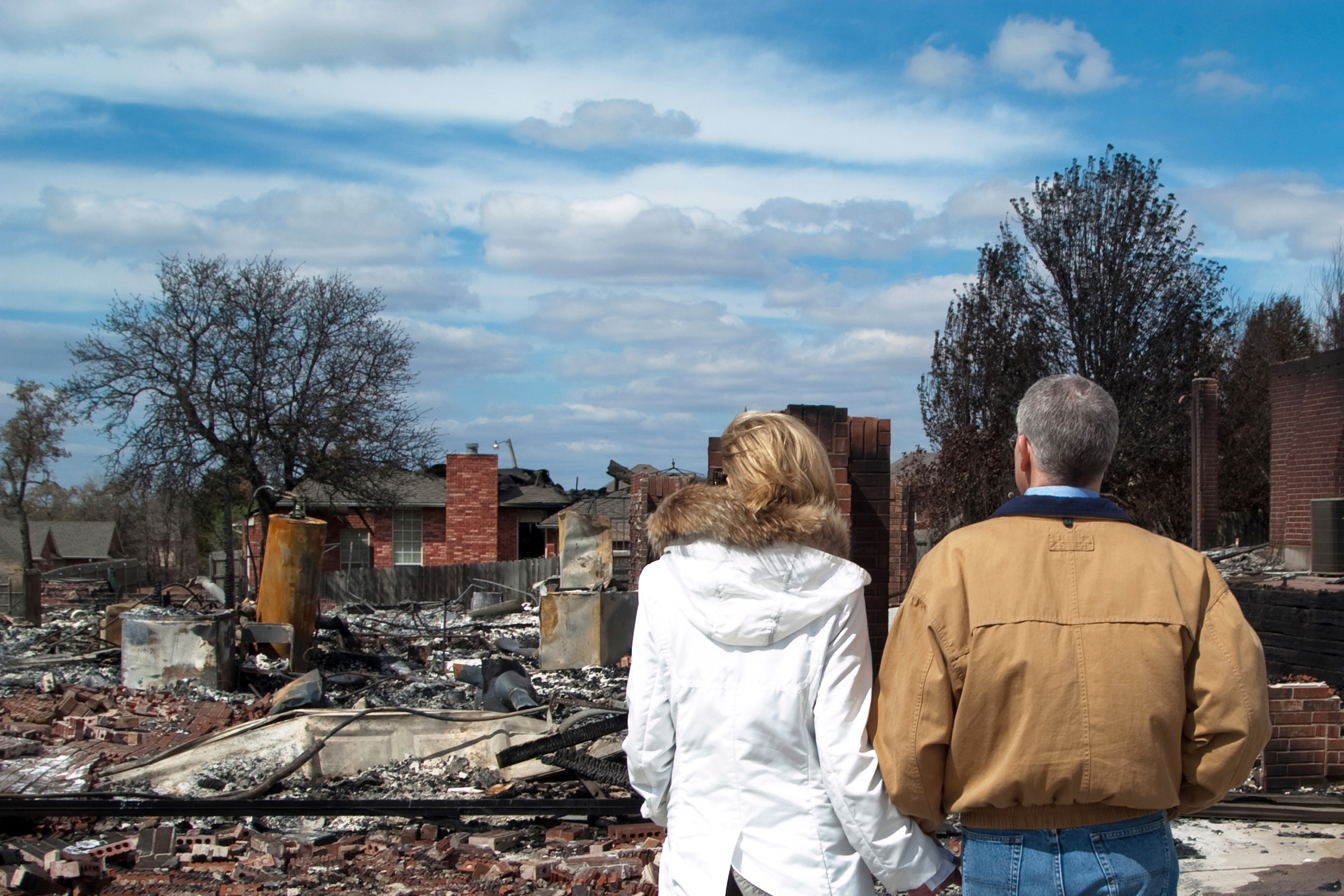
Governor Brad Henry and his wife Kim Henry view destroyed houses, 2009 wildfires

Oklahoma's standards for science education incorporate material from the 2013 Next Generation Science Standards, and include information about Oklahoma's climate. Consensus has yet to emerge on how to present the topic of climate change in the state's public schools.

== See also ==
- Plug-in electric vehicles in Oklahoma
