= Chat (mining) =

Rock waste from lead-zinc mining

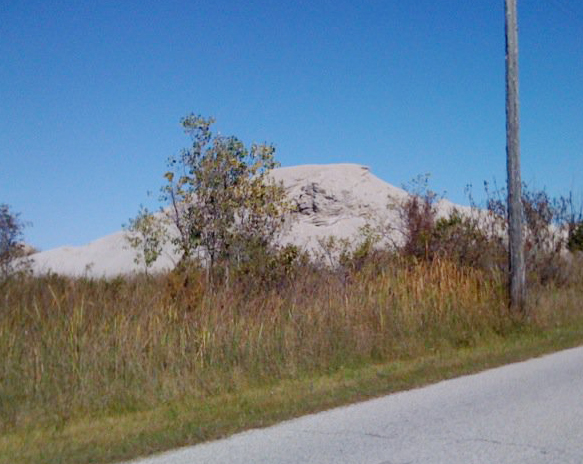
This image, taken in 2010, shows a chat pile near Picher, Oklahoma. These piles contain lead-contaminated dust and are part of the reasons the area is designated as the Tar Creek Superfund site.

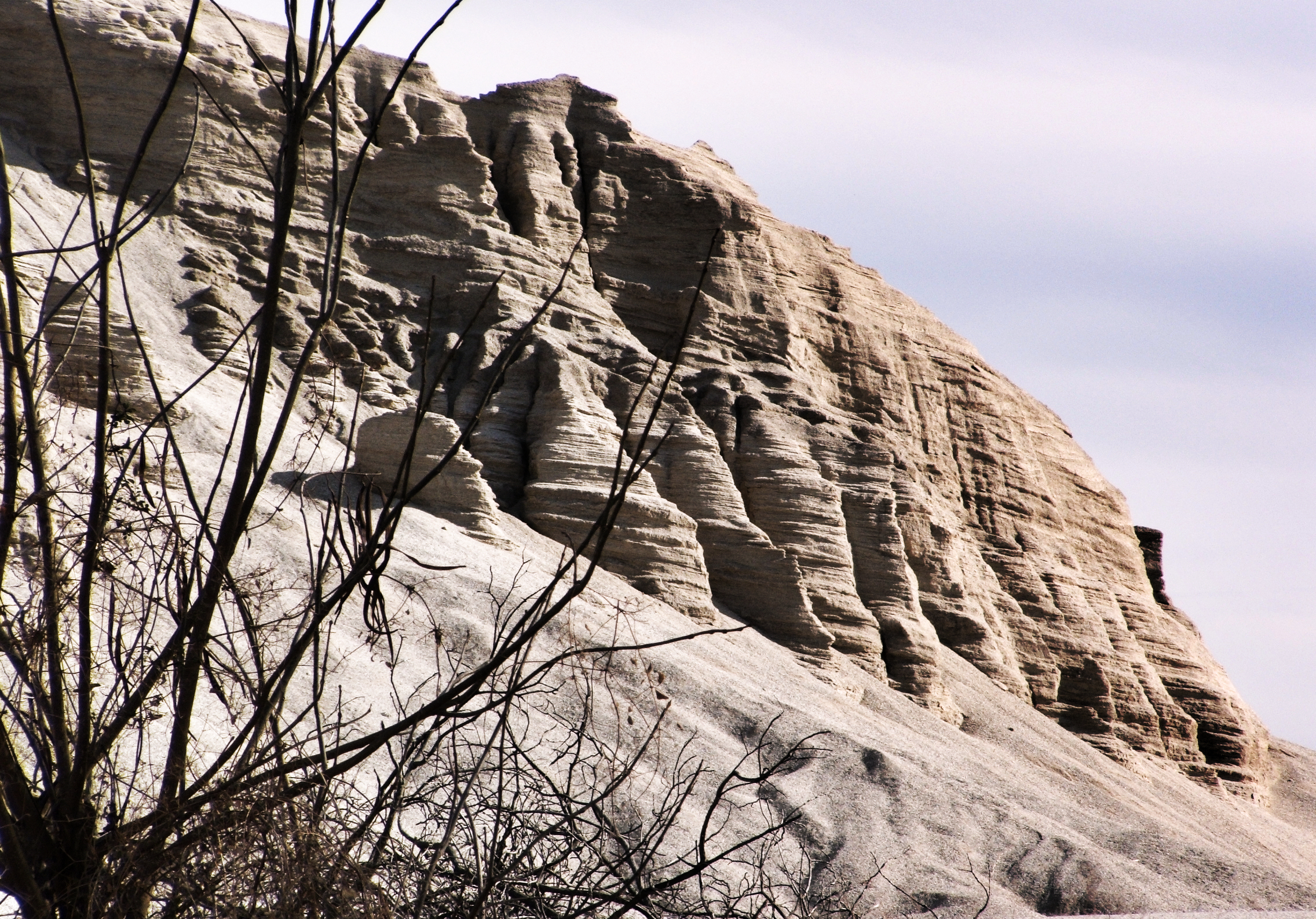
Another image, taken in 2006, of chat in the Tar Creek Superfund site

Chat is a local term in the Tri-State Mining District for gravel-like waste created by ore crushing in lead–zinc mining operations there in the late 1800s and mid-1900s. Chat is mainly composed of chert, dolomite, and sulfide minerals, but is contaminated with lead, zinc, cadmium, and other metals.

The contamination of chat piles varies, lessening each time the pile is re-milled. Most of the heavy metals are present in fine particles in the chat, rather than the gravel-sized stones which are what it is mostly sold for. These fine particles can be blown by wind (20% of fine particles were subject to wind transport in one Oklahoma town studied). Once airborne, they can be inhaled by humans (6% were of appropriate size in that town) or deposited into soil or water.

As of 2006, about 100 million tons of chat were present in the Oklahoma, Kansas, and Missouri tri-state mining region.

A 2020 study of chat showed that Picher, a town surrounded by chat piles but not currently engaging in industrial activities, had 2–5 times the benchmark level of lead contamination (here Tulsa, Oklahoma). The chat piles contributed at least 10% of the inbound lead contamination per year (mass flux) to a lake 18 km away, and likely much more to Picher itself.

== History ==
Historic lead and zinc mining in the Midwestern United States was centered in two major areas: the Tri-State district covering more than 2,500 square miles (6,500 km^{2}) in southwestern Missouri, southeastern Kansas, and northeastern Oklahoma and the Old Lead Belt covering about 110 square miles (280 km^{2}) in southeastern Missouri. The first recorded mining occurred in the Old Lead Belt in about 1742. The production increased significantly in both the tri-state area and the Old Lead Belt during the mid-19th century and lasted up to 1970.

== Cleanup ==
Currently production still occurs in a third area, the Viburnum Trend, in southeastern Missouri. Mining and milling of ore produced more than 500 million tons of wastes in the tri-state area and about 250 million tons of wastes in the Old Lead Belt. More than 75 percent of this waste has been removed, with some portion of it used over the years. Today, approximately 100 million tons of chat remain in the tri-state area. The EPA, the states of Oklahoma, Kansas, and Missouri, local communities, and private companies continue to work together in implementing and monitoring response actions that reduce or remove potential adverse impacts posed by remaining mine wastes contaminated with lead, zinc, cadmium, and other metals.

== Ore processing ==
Ore production consisted of crushing and grinding the rock to standard sizes and separating the ore. Ore processing was accomplished in either a dry gravity separation or through a wet washing or flotation separation. Dry processes produced a fine gravel waste commonly called "chat." The wet processes resulted in the creation of tailing ponds used to dispose of waste material after ore separation. The wastes from wet separation are typically sand and silt size and are called "tailings." Milling produces large chat waste piles and flat areas with tailings deposited in impoundments. Tailings generally contain higher concentrations of heavy metals and therefore present a higher risk to human health and the environment through direct contact. Chat typically ranges in diameter from 1/4 to 5/8 inch. Intermingled material such as sands measure 0.033–0.008 inches in diameter and fine tailings are less than 0.008 inches (0.20 mm) in diameter.

== Uses ==
Although poisonous, chat can be used to improve traction on snow-covered roads; as gravel; and as construction aggregate, principally for railroad ballast, highway construction, and concrete production.

Although poisonous, chat is sometimes used as gravel, and is sold for use in road construction, for parking lots, and for home foundations.

Since the enforcement of EPA use guidelines began in June 2000, chat is sold commercially, rather than to anyone, mainly to construction contractors.

Regulators debated as of 2003 whether people should be allowed to use chat to fill in mine shafts, due to concerns about heavy metals leaching into the soil and groundwater. According to Mary Jane Calvey, a program manager in the Oklahoma Department of Environmental Quality, though, the heavy metals have an "affinity" to clay and do not leak further down than a few inches below the base of the chat pile.

== Regulation ==
The Bureau of Indian Affairs put a moratorium on the sale of Indian-owned chat in 1997, and the EPA developed a use policy for it, which they began to enforce on June 1, 2000. The BIA ban was lifted in August 2001.
