= Watermelon Creek (Georgia) =

- Location within Georgia Location within the United States

Physical characteristics
- Source
  - coordinates: 31.9818666°N 82.0215076°W
- Mouth
  - coordinates: 31.8243724°N 82.0156735°W

Watermelon Creek is a stream in the U.S. state of Georgia. It is a tributary to the Altamaha River.

Watermelon Creek was named for the watermelon crop in the area.
