= Watermelon Slim =

- Watermelon Slim at Silver Dollar Room, Toronto, Ontario

Background information
- Born: William P. Homans III; 1949 (age 76–77); Boston, Massachusetts, United States
- Origin: Tulsa, Oklahoma, United States
- Genres: Blues
- Instruments: Harmonica, guitar, vocals
- Years active: 1973–present
- Label: NorthernBlues Music

William P. Homans III, (born 1949) professionally known as "Watermelon Slim", is an American blues musician. He plays both guitar and harmonica. He is currently signed to NorthernBlues Music, based in Toronto, Ontario. Homans has also earned bachelor's and master's degrees from University of Oregon and Oklahoma State University.

== Biography ==
Homans was born in Boston, Massachusetts, United States, (Note: This musician's real name is William P. Homans III. He was the son of noted Boston civil rights lawyer William P. Homans Jr.) but has said that he was raised in North Carolina, where he was first exposed to blues music from about the time he was five years old. During childhood, he sang in choirs and glee clubs. Homans later explained that he first played music in 1958, on a set of bongo drums. A year later, he acquired a harmonica. It took almost a decade before he became sufficiently experienced to take on a professional gig at Middlebury College in Vermont. (Note: Homans earned five dollars for his performance.)

Homans has been performing since the 1970s and has been linked to several notable blues musicians, including John Lee Hooker, Robert Cray, Champion Jack Dupree, Bonnie Raitt, "Country" Joe McDonald, and Henry Vestine of Canned Heat.

The first recording project to feature Homans was Merry Airbrakes, an album recorded and released on a small label in 1973 after returning from a tour of duty in Vietnam. This LP, most of which he wrote, has been described as "furiously anti-war." Homans had become, after his return home, involved with Vietnam Veterans Against the War, and the album had songs with lyrics reflecting drug use, spiritual exploration, and involvement with the emotional cost of fighting "enemies." The album, originals of which are now highly collectible, has been re-released.

In Vietnam, he contracted an illness that put him in a Cam Ranh Bay military hospital. While convalescing, he started playing a Vietnamese guitar, made with balsa wood and rusty metal strings. He played it as a sort of Lap Steel guitar that's why his guitar tone-bar was a Zippo cigarette lighter. When he was transferred back to the U.S., he was not allowed to bring his Vietnamese guitar along, so he bought a new American guitar shortly after his arrival and continued to develop this new skill. By 1979, he felt adrift in the Boston area and naively decided to move to Oklahoma, buy some land and earn a living as a farmer. He grew many different crops, from cantaloupes to artichokes, but the farm was never a financial success, merely a sideline. Homans later said that watermelons were the one crop on which never lost money. After Vietnam, Homans spent most of his adult life working for a living as a truck driver, just to make ends meet.

According to Oklahoma Magazine, Homans was living on a truck farm in July, 1980, in Pushmataha County, Oklahoma when he first adopted the moniker "Watermelon Slim." (Note: Homans may have chosen the nickname because his farm produced watermelons. He recalled that he was holding a harmonica in one hand and eating a piece of watermelon with the other hand on that day.)

He never stopped playing music, and hooked up with some professional players in Oregon in 1984. This improved his skills and gave him confidence in his music abilities. Then he went to Europe, intending to establish himself as a soloist. When that attempt failed, he returned to Boston and truck driving. In 1993, he returned to his 'truck patch" in Oklahoma, where he has been based ever since. He also formed his supporting band, "The Workers."

His more recent music is rooted in the Mississippi Delta style, as he plays his dobro guitar lap-style, lefthanded and backwards, with a slide. While for decades typically an acoustic performer, with The Workers he has concentrated more on playing electric.

In 1998, Homans met two Oklahoma State University philosophy professors, Doren Recker and Mike Rhodes, with whom he started a band called "Fried Okra Jones". This band went through several changes in personnel, including the blues woman Honour Hero Havoc, bass player, and guitarist "Texas" Ray Isom. In 1999, Homans recorded for the first time since 1973, an EP/CD called Fried Okra Jones. In 2002, Homans made his first national release for Southern Records, Big Shoes to Fill, produced by his longtime musical colleague from Massachusetts, Chris Stovall Brown, with cousins Kyle and Adam Enevoldsen on drums and bass. A few months later, Homans had a serious heart attack, but bounced back quickly and continued to drive trucks, hauling industrial waste, and in 2003, used his work vacation time to make his first international tour, a solo journey through southern England.

In 2004, Homans left this last truck driving job to go on tour with his supporting band, "The Workers". In 2005, Homans was nominated for the W. C. Handy Award for "Best New Artist Debut", for his acoustic masterpiece CD, Up Close & Personal, produced by Chris Hardwick. He and his band were also nominated for six more Handy Awards in 2006, in a variety of categories, and for a Maple Blues Award from the Toronto Blues Society for the 2006 album Watermelon Slim & the Workers. In early 2007, this album won in The 6th annual Independent Music Awards for Best Blues Album. Watermelon Slim & The Workers were also nominated for Blues Album of the year for The Wheel Man in the 7th annual Independent Music Awards.

In 2007, Homans made the CD The Wheel Man, which was nominated for another six Blues Music Awards. At the awards ceremony in 2008, Homans and his band won the award for Best Blues Band of 2007, and The Wheel Man was awarded Best Blues CD of 2007. Besides that, Homans won the Maple Blues Award for B.B. King International Entertainer. The Wheel Man also was No. 1 Blues Album in England's Mojo Magazine blues CD poll for the second year in a row.

In 2008, The Workers recorded their third CD for Toronto's NorthernBlues record label, No Paid Holidays. Homans was also inducted into the Oklahoma Blues Hall of Fame at this time.

In 2009, this CD was nominated for another four Blues Music Awards, for a total of seventeen awards from the Blues Foundation. A few months later, Escape From the Chicken Coop, Homans' first country-and-western CD recorded in Nashville with Paul Franklin, Darrell Scott and other top Nashville session players, was released on NorthernBlues. Future releases will include another Nashville record, reflecting Homans' North Carolina Grand Ole Opry roots, an acoustic duo CD featuring Honour Havoc, and blues CDs with Mississippi bluesmen James "Super Chikan" Johnson and Robert "The Wolfman" Belfour.

In 1972-73, Homans met country blues star Bonnie Raitt at one of her performances. Both Raitt and Homans shared the same musical hero, Mississippi Fred McDowell, an established artist who had actually been Raitt's teacher. In 1979, Homans dropped in on one of Raitt's shows. The reporter covering the show for the Norman Transcript wrote as much about Homans as he did about Raitt. Raitt and Homans both attended the unveiling of a Mississippi Blues Trail marker honoring the late McDowell. Later, Homan went alone to McDowell's grave and serenaded his mentor, acknowledging the debt he owed the man who started Watermelon Slim on the road to success.

Homans is a graduate of Lenox School for Boys, a boarding school in Lenox, MA. Homans has a bachelor's degree in journalism and history from the University of Oregon, and a master's degree in history from Oklahoma State University. Before dropping out to enlist in the Vietnam War he had attended Middlebury College. He came back home a fervent anti-war activist, and remains a member and supporter of Vietnam Veterans Against the War.

In February 2019, his album Church Of The Blues reached number 7 in the US Billboard Blues Albums chart.

== Film work ==
Watermelon Slim's music is featured in the 2009 environmental documentary Tar Creek, which is about the Tar Creek environmental disaster in Oklahoma. Music from Big Shoes to Fill, Up Close & Personal, plus a live version of "Oklahoma Blues" score this award-winning documentary by writer/director Matt Myers. Homans and Myers met while attending school together at Oklahoma State University.

== Discography ==
=== Albums ===
- Merry Airbrakes (1973)
- Fried Okra Jones [3-song EP/CD] (Independent Records 64315 70202 26, 2000)
- Big Shoes to Fill (Southern Records Group 1001, 2003)
- Up Close & Personal (Southern Records Group 1003, 2004)
- Watermelon Slim & the Workers (Northern Blues 0032, 2006)
- The Wheel Man (Northern Blues 0038, 2007)
- No Paid Holidays (Northern Blues 0047, 2008)
- Escape from the Chicken Coop (Northern Blues 0054, 2009)
- Ringers (Northern Blues 0059, 2010)
- Watermelon Slim & Super Chikan: Okiesippi Blues (Northern Blues 0061, 2011)
- Bull Goose Rooster (Northern Blues 0064, 2013)
- Golden Boy (DixieFrog 8796, 2017)
- Church of the Blues (Northern Blues 0065, 2019)
- Traveling Man (Northern Blues 0066, 2020) 2-CD
- Winners of Us All (Dreamplay Records, 2024) reissue of Golden Boy with 4 additional tracks added on.
- "On the Edge But in the Groove" WWW.BloosRecords.com, 2026)

=== DVDs ===
- Ripe for the Picking (live) (2006)
- Live at the Ground Zero Blues Club (2010)

== See also ==
- Mississippi Fred McDowell
- Bonnie Raitt
