= Francis H. Brownell =

Washington state pioneer, lawyer, and businessman

Francis Herbert Brownell
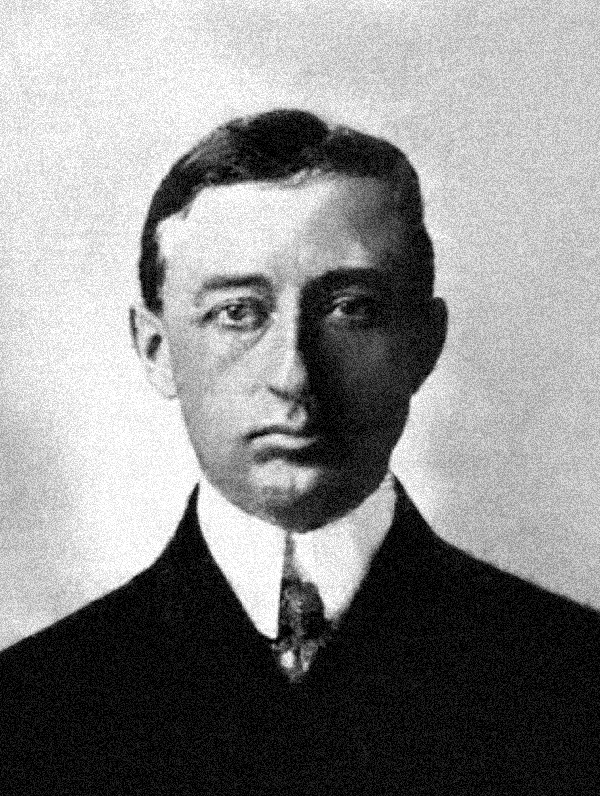
- 1902 portrait
- Born: April 21, 1867; Little Compton, Rhode Island, US
- Died: March 8, 1954 (aged 86); New York City, US
- Resting place: Queen Anne Columbarium
- Education: Brown University (graduated in 1888, BA); Columbia Law School
- Occupations: Lawyer; First National Bank of Everett director; president of Everett Chamber of Commerce; American Smelting & Refining Company (managerial positions); Seattle National Bank (director of the board, chairman of the directors board)
- Years active: 1890–1950
- Organizations: Masonic Peninsular Lodge No. 95, F. & A. M. of Everett; Knights of Pythias; Benevolent and Protective Order of Elks; Snohomish County Agricultural Society; Seattle Country Club; Rainier Club; Washington State Bar Association
- Known for: Washington state pioneer, lawyer, social activist, and investor. Contributed to the cities of Tacoma, Everett, Seattle and New York. Occupied mainly managerial positions at companies in mining, smelting, banking, railroad, copper, brass, sugar, and other businesses.
- Political party: Republican
- Spouse: Josephine Noble (married 1894–1954)
- Children: 2

Francis Herbert Brownell (April 21, 1867 – March 8, 1954) was a Washington state pioneer, lawyer, and businessman. During his lifetime, he worked in and made contributions to the cities of Tacoma, Everett, Seattle, and New York. As an active pioneer and developer of Everett, he was a member of the hospital board, trustee of the city library, director of the First National Bank, and president of the Chamber of Commerce.

Brownell's law career started in New York in 1890. The following year he came to Washington state, at the time of its foundation, searching for better business opportunities. He worked in partnership with other lawyers, his specialty being commercial and corporate law. Among his clients were some of the biggest mining, railroading, and banking companies of that time.

In later years, Brownell worked for the Guggenheim family for their American Smelting & Refining Company and at the Seattle National Bank. His partnership with the Guggenheims lasted a long time, and Brownell occupied managerial positions in their company from 1909 until his retirement from business in 1950. Brownell became a director of the board of the Seattle National Bank in 1925, and later worked there as a chairman of the board of directors. He was "the second largest individual stockholder" of the bank, and in 1929, as its leader, witnessed the bank's merger into Seattle First National Bank.

Brownell invested heavily in real estate, logging, and lumber companies of Seattle and Everett. He had a vast array of other managerial positions in law, banking, copper, brass, railroad, and other businesses. He led an active social life, being a part of well-known organizations and fraternities. Politically, he was a Republican. With his wife, he attended the Episcopalian church.

== Early life and family ==
Francis Brownell was born on April 21, 1867, in Little Compton, Rhode Island. Brownell's ancestors emigrated from England to America in 1636, settling in Massachusetts. His great-grandfather was a soldier during the Revolutionary War of 1775–1783, and his grandfather was a member of the Rhode Island legislature. Brownell's father, Frederick, was born in Rhode Island, and was a town clerk and treasurer, and also a member of the state legislature. He married Ann Coggshall, whose ancestor was John Coggeshall, founder of the colony of Rhode Island and Providence Plantations. Frederick and Ann had four children, of which Francis was the eldest.

== Education ==
Brownell studied in public schools, until he won a scholarship to Moses Brown School. He graduated from Moses Brown School in 1884, and proceeded to study at Brown University, working as a tutor to pay for his education. He received a Bachelor of Arts degree in 1888. Later, he studied at Columbia Law School.

== Career ==
=== First jobs in New York and Washington state ===
Brownell started his law practice in New York in June 1890.

Brownell decided to go west in the search of better career opportunities soon after the western part of Washington Territory became Washington state. In August 1890, he settled in Tacoma. He resumed his law practice there in partnership with George A. Brown, a lawyer and nominee for the Nevada Supreme Court bench.

=== Everett, Washington ===
Brownell and Brown moved their practice to Everett in 1891, soon after the city's foundation. They kept working together until 1895, when Brown left for Nevada. After Brown's departure, Brownell worked alone for several years, until in 1902, he partnered with J. A. Coleman. They opened their own law firm, Brownell & Coleman, and by 1903 had gained a "distinctively representative clientage."

Brownell largely worked in the field of commercial and corporate law. His clients were considered the leading firms in Everett, including the Everett Improvement Company (formerly the Everett Land Company), the Everett Street Railway & Light Company, the Everett Pulp & Paper Company, the Puget Sound Reduction Company, the Monte Cristo Railroad Company, the Everett First National Bank, the American National Bank, the Monte Cristo Mines, and several other mining companies.

The beginning of 1900's, in the U.S. politics contained many important political events, including the introduction of the new primary election law in 1908 and the holding of the first primary election. That year, Brownell participated in Judge W. W. Black's election campaign as a specialist who fully analyzed and explained the new law.

Brownell was a member of the Everett hospital board and a trustee of the city library. He also served as a director in the First National Bank of Everett and president of the Everett Chamber of Commerce.

=== Jobs in New York and Seattle ===
==== American Smelting and Refining Company ====
In 1905, Brownell moved to Seattle, where he kept practicing law, and also worked for the Guggenheim family in their smelting and refining business. In 1909, he became president of the Federal Mining and Smelting Company, which had recently been bought by the Guggenheims' American Smelting & Refining Company.

By 1919, Brownell moved to New York, accepting the Guggenheims' invitation to fill the executive position in their American Smelting & Refining Company. By 1925, the company was estimated as "the largest of its kind in the world," and owned and operated smelters in Mexico, South America, and North America.

Brownell started as general counsel to the company. At different times he was the president and the chairman of the company finance committee, the first vice president, the chairman of the company board, and head of the company.

In 1925, Brownell, as the chairman of the company finance committee, played a key role in a corporate dispute between the Guggenheims and Karl Eilers, helping the Guggenheims in defending their rights.

==== Seattle National Bank ====
After becoming counsel for the Guggenheims, Brownell lived mostly in New York. However, he still spent much time in Seattle. In 1925, he was elected director of the board of the Seattle National Bank. According to chairman of the board, Daniel Kelleher, Brownell's friend and the "largest individual stockholder" of the bank, Brownell was a "successful business executive" who took an active part in the development of the National Bank and its international affairs. Brownell became "the second largest individual stockholder" of the bank.

In 1929, Brownell succeeded Daniel Kelleher at the position of the chairman of the board of directors. The same year, under Brownell's leadership the bank merged with the Seattle First National Bank.

=== Other activity and positions ===
Besides his main field of work in Everett and Seattle, Brownell invested in real estate in both cities as well as in logging and lumber companies.

In New York, he was a member of the executive committee and a director of the Chase National Bank, the General Cable Corporation, the Republic Brass Corporation, the Northern Pacific Railway, the Mortgage Bond Company, and the American Sugar & Refining Company; president of the Washington State Bar Association, and board chairman of the Revere Copper & Brass Incorporation.

As the president of the Copper Institute and chairman of the Copper Exporters Incorporation, Brownell was involved in a dispute in regard to the copper price increase in 1929. He was known in business as a "prominent financier and Puget Sound area business leader."

=== Retirement and later activity ===
In 1950, Brownell retired from his business activity. After retirement, he published a brochure, called Gold and the Monetary Problem in 1949, disputing the monetary system, prices on gold, and dealings connected to its rise and fall.

== Memberships ==
In college, Brownell was a member of Alpha Delta Phi and Phi Beta Kappa social fraternities. In later life, he belonged to the Masonic Peninsular Lodge No. 95, F. & A. M. of Everett, the Knights of Pythias, the Benevolent and Protective Order of Elks, and was one of the organizers of the Snohomish County Agricultural Society.

He was a member of the Seattle exclusive social organization the Country Club, the Seattle Golf Club, the Rainier Club, and the Washington State Bar Association.

== Personal life, family and death ==
Brownell married Josephine Noble in 1894; they had two sons, Francis H. Brownell Jr. and Kenneth Cooke Brownell. Both sons followed in their father's footsteps: Francis H. Jr. worked at the Seattle National Bank, occupying the position of a vice president, and Kenneth C. was president and chairman of the American Smelting & Refining Company and subsequently of the Federal Mining and Smelting Company, whose rights belonged to the ASARCo.

In 1902, Brownell built a family home on the southwest corner of 23rd and Rucker streets in Everett. Later, the family lived in New York, and additionally, like every member of the Seattle Country Club, had a residence on Bainbridge Island.

The Brownells attended the Episcopalian church, of which Josephine Brownell was a member. In politics, Brownell supported the Republican party.

Brownell died on March 8, 1954, in his home in New York, after an illness that lasted several months.

== See also ==
- Columbia Law School
- Washington State Bar Association
- Guggenheim family
- American Smelting & Refining Company
- Rainier Club

== Literature cited ==
- "Federal Mining Co. Gains annual report submitted and Francis H. Brownell elected president", New York Times, New York: H.J. Raymond & Co., p. 11, October 20, 1909, ISSN 0362-4331, LCCN sn78005343, OCLC 1645522
- Barron, Clarence W., ed. (April 7, 1921), "Vote at smelting meeting shows Guggenheim majority", Wall Street Journal, New York: Dow Jones & Company, pp. 1, 9, ISSN 0099-9660, LCCN sn85047504, OCLC 781541372
- "Bank elections announced all presidents retained", Seattle Daily Times, Seattle: The Seattle Times Company, p. 9, January 14, 1925, ISSN 2639-4898, LCCN sn86072007, OCLC 1765328
- Whitfield, William M., ed. (1926), History of Snohomish County, Washington, vol. 1, Chicago: Pioneer Historical Publishing Company, LCCN 85190494, OCLC 8437390
- "Brownell named board chairman of Seattle Bank", Seattle Daily Times, Seattle: The Seattle Times Company, p. 32, March 10, 1929, ISSN 2639-4898, LCCN sn86072007, OCLC 1765328
- "Copper price may face investigation", Seattle Daily Times, Seattle: The Seattle Times Company, p. 33, March 14, 1929, ISSN 2639-4898, LCCN sn86072007, OCLC 1765328
- "Brownell new FM&S president", The Spokesman-Review, Spokane: Cowles Company, p. 39, April 12, 1949, ISSN 1064-7317, LCCN sn84024754, OCLC 11102610
- "Brownell sees $50 gold price", The Spokesman-Review, Spokane: Cowles Company, p. 31, December 18, 1949, ISSN 1064-7317, LCCN sn84024754, OCLC 11102610
- "Francis H. Brownell dies in N. Y. at 86", Seattle Daily Times, Seattle: The Seattle Times Company, p. 25, March 8, 1954, ISSN 2639-4898, LCCN sn86072007, OCLC 1765328
- "Financier dies", Spokane Chronicle, Spokane: Cowles Company, p. 5, March 8, 1954, LCCN sn86072020, OCLC 14374699
- "Francis H. Brownell", Daily News, New York: Daily News L.P., p. 354, March 9, 1954, LCCN sn83030450, OCLC 9541172
- "Francis Brownell, corporation head", Newport Daily News, Newport: Sherman Publishing, p. 3, March 9, 1954, ISSN 1053-2560, LCCN sn83021172, OCLC 9882960
- Bagley, Clarence B. (1916), History of Seattle: From the Earliest Settlement to the Present Time, Chicago: S. J. Clarke Publishing Company, LCCN 16011408, OCLC 7372062
- Hast, Adele (1991), Hast, Adele (ed.), International Directory of Company Histories, vol. 4, Chicago: St. James Press, ISBN 1558620605, ISSN 1557-0126, LCCN 2001208775, OCLC 954490389
- Prosser, William Farrand (1903), Lewis, Edward Gardner (ed.), A history of the Puget Sound country, its resources, its commerce and its people, New York City: Edward Gardner Lewis, LCCN 05013767
