= List of Superfund sites in Oklahoma =

This is a list of Superfund sites in Oklahoma designated under the Comprehensive Environmental Response, Compensation, and Liability Act (CERCLA) environmental law. The CERCLA federal law of 1980 authorized the United States Environmental Protection Agency (EPA) to create a list of polluted locations requiring a long-term response to clean up hazardous material contaminations. These locations are known as Superfund sites, and are placed on the National Priorities List (NPL).

The NPL guides the EPA in "determining which sites warrant further investigation" for environmental remediation. As of May 2, 2010, there were eight Superfund sites on the National Priorities List in Oklahoma. One more site has been proposed for entry on the list and five others have been cleaned up and removed from it.

== Superfund sites ==
Proposed for addition to National Priorities List
Deleted from National Priorities List

CERCLIS ID	Name	County	Reason	Proposed	Listed	Construction completed	Partially deleted	Deleted
OKD980620983	Compass Industries (Avery Drive)	Tulsa	Soil contamination by waste aviation fuel, oily sludges, miscellaneous solvents, acids, caustics, bleaches, benzene and PCBs from former industrial waste dumping in municipal landfill, counter to permit and regulations.	09/08/1983	09/21/1984	06/30/1992	–	07/18/2002
OKD007188717	Double Eagle Refinery Co.	Oklahoma	Soil and sludge contaminated by lead and soil and sediments contaminated by xylene, ethylbenzene and TCE.	06/24/1988	03/31/1989	09/07/1999	–	08/21/2008
OKD980696470	Fourth Street Abandoned Refinery	Oklahoma	Sludge contaminated by lead and chrysene and soil and sediment contaminated by phenanthrene and naphthalene.	06/24/1988	03/31/1989	09/27/1996	–	08/21/2008
OKD000400093	Hardage/Criner	McClain	Groundwater and soil contaminated with metals, polychlorinated biphenyls, persistent organic pollutants, pesticides, volatile organic compounds.	12/30/1982	09/08/1983	09/30/1997	–	–
OKD007221831	Fansteel Metals/FMRI	Muskogee	NRC approved cleanup disrupted by site owner bankruptcy. Soil, surface water, groundwater, and onsite buildings contaminated by volatile organic compounds, heavy metals, uranium, thorium, and other radionuclides. Areas of the site were found to have surface radioactive contamination up to 45 times background radiation.	03/23/2023	09/07/2023			
OKD082471988	Hudson Refinery	Payne	Soil, sediment and surface water contamination by TEL, hydrogen sulfide, benzene, hydrochloric acid, hydrosulphuric acid, hydrogen fluoride, mercury, arsenic, chromium, ammonia, calcium hypochlorite and asbestos.	04/23/1999	07/22/1999	–	–	–
OK0002024099	Imperial Refining Company	Carter	Waste piles, soil and contaminated by benzene, ethylbenzene, toluene, xylene, PAHs, oil and grease, and metals including arsenic, from refining operations that ended in 1934.	05/11/2000	07/27/2000	09/18/2008	–	–
OKD980620868	Mosley Road Sanitary Landfill	Oklahoma	Groundwater contamination by benzene and vinyl chloride from former disposal of around two million gallons of industrial waste into unlined pits.	06/24/1988	02/21/1990	–	–	Proposed for 09/2010
OKD000829440	National Zinc Corp.	Washington	Lead, cadmium and arsenic contamination of soil from former zinc smelting operations.	05/10/1993	–	–	–	–
OKD091598870	Oklahoma Refining Co.	Caddo	Debris, groundwater, surface water, soil and sediment contamination by base neutral acids, metals, PAHs and VOCs.	06/24/1988	02/21/1990	–	–	–
OKD980748446	Sand Springs Petrochemical Complex	Tulsa	Soil, sludge, concrete and debris contaminated by base neutral acids, metals, PAHs and VOCs.	09/08/1983	06/10/1986	09/30/1997	–	03/17/2000
OKD980629844	Tar Creek	Ottawa	Groundwater, surface water, soil, and fish tissue contaminated with cadmium, iron, lead, zinc.	12/30/1982	09/08/1983	–	–	–
OKD980620967	Tenth Street Dump/Junkyard	Oklahoma	PCB contamination of soil from former salvage yard, junk yard and landfill operations.	01/22/1987	07/22/1987	06/11/1996	–	11/21/2000
OK1571724391	Tinker Air Force Base	Oklahoma	Groundwater contamination by chlorinated solvents and hexavalent chromium.	03/29/1985	07/22/1987	–	–	–
OKD987096195	Tulsa Fuel and Manufacturing	Tulsa	Soil contamination by heavy metals including lead, cadmium and arsenic from former zinc smelting operations.	??/??/1998	01/19/1999	–	–	–
OK0001010917	Wilcox Oil Company	Creek	Soil contamination by oil and oil refinement. Lead, polycyclic aromatic hydrocarbons (PAHS) contamination.	5/14/2013	12/12/2013			

== See also ==
- List of Superfund sites in the United States
- List of environmental issues
- List of waste types
- TOXMAP
