= Tar Creek Superfund site =

Contaminated area in Oklahoma, US

Tar Creek
- Superfund site
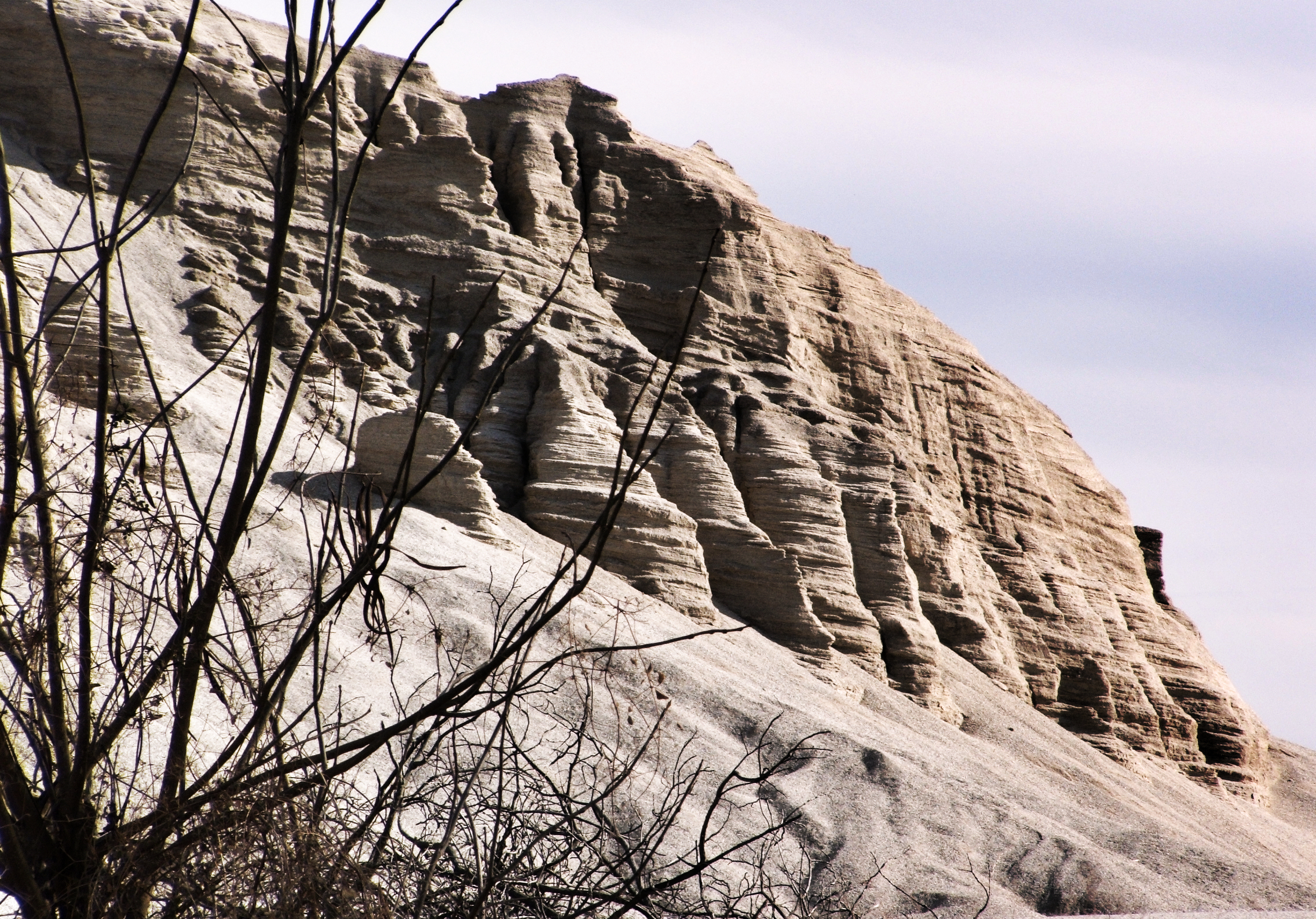

- Location within Oklahoma
- Location: Picher, Ottawa County, Oklahoma; 36°58′32″N 94°50′17″W

Information

Progress

Tar Creek Superfund site is a United States Superfund site, declared in 1983, located in the cities of Picher, Douthat and Cardin, Ottawa County, in northeastern Oklahoma. From 1900 to the 1960s lead mining and zinc mining companies left behind huge open chat piles that were heavily contaminated by these metals, cadmium, and others. Metals from the mining waste leached into the soil, and seeped into groundwater, ponds, and lakes. Because of the contamination, Picher children have suffered elevated lead, zinc and manganese levels, resulting in learning disabilities and a variety of other health problems. The EPA declared Picher to be one of the most toxic areas in the United States.

The Quapaw Tribe of Oklahoma originally owned the area and leased property to mining companies. Government rules restricted many Quapaw landowners from realizing money from royalties, which companies paid on these leases. In addition, the people have suffered extended adverse health effects, including high rates of miscarriage and neurological damage to children, as a result of the unregulated mining activities before passage of federal environmental laws.

The Tar Creek Superfund site is the Oklahoma section of four National Priority List (NPL) Superfund Sites that together encompass the Tri-State mining district, an old lead and zinc mining district divided by the EPA into the Tar Creek Site (Ottawa County, Oklahoma), Cherokee County Site (Cherokee County, Kansas), the Oronogo-Duenweg Site (Jasper County, Missouri), and the Newton County Mine Tailings Site (Newton County, Missouri). While some clean-up has been conducted, in 2019 EPA committed annual expenditures of $16 million for several years to continue the project. In 2021, Tar Creek was listed by American Rivers as one of the ten most endangered rivers in the United States due to contamination from this Superfund Site. Climate change makes this contamination risk worse: extreme rainfall increases runoff and leaching.

== Origins ==
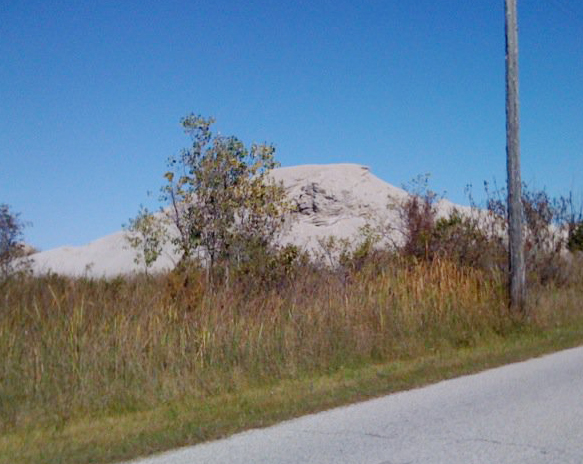
This image, taken in 2010, shows a chat pile near Picher. These piles contain lead-contaminated dust and are one of the reasons the area was designated a Superfund site.

Tar Creek is an area of 1,188 square miles located in Ottawa County, Oklahoma, within the Tri-State district of lead and zinc mining in Northeastern Oklahoma, Southwestern Missouri, and Southeastern Kansas.

The first mining took place in Missouri around 1850. By 1908, sites had been started in Miami, Picher, and Commerce. The construction of railroads in the area stimulated production, increasing access to markets. Mining here quickly yielded a high economic return. By 1924 most of the young, American-born whites raised on farms in the district were employed by the mining industry.

When mining began in the area, most of the land was owned by the federally recognized Quapaw tribe. Following the Oklahoma Organic Act, an 1897 court ruling would allow allotted land to be leased for the purpose of mining but this was later curtailed by numerous subsequent lawsuits. Because of mismanagement by the Bureau of Indian Affairs, only about one sixth of Quapaw landowners would ever receive the land lease payments and mined mineral royalties they were owed. Between 1915 and 1930, decreasing demand and production resulted in mining companies seeking to buy the land rather than lease it, and consolidation took place among the companies to gain such control.

During World War I, the region supplied 45 percent of the lead and 50 percent of the zinc used by the United States. 75% of the zinc and lead used for bullets during WWI and WWII came from the mines in the region. Advances in technology increased production. 1926 was the year of highest production in the area, and Ottawa County became the world's largest source of lead and zinc, employing 11,000 men in almost 250 mills. Between 1908 and 1950, the entire Tri-State Mining Region had generated more than an estimated 1 billion U.S. dollars. After 1950, many mines were shut down, largely because their adverse environmental impacts on soil, groundwater, and air had been recognized.

== National and state intervention ==
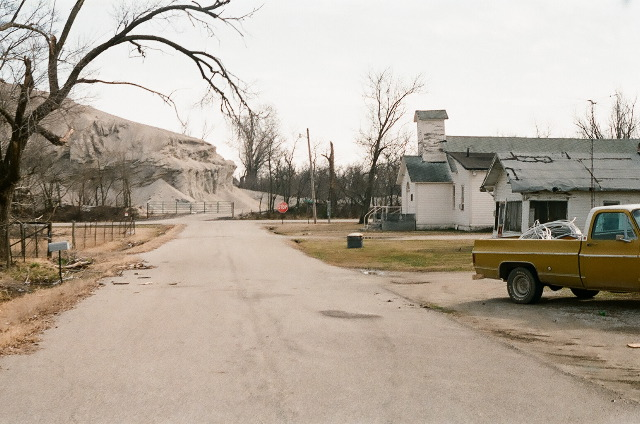
The mining waste was located very close to neighborhoods in the town of Picher.

In the 1960s and 1970s, health and environmental hazards were found at mining and industrial sites across the United States, such as Times Beach and Love Canal. Companies had changed and often the generators of such hazards were no longer in business and unavailable to mitigate or clean up such toxic areas. On December 11, 1980, Congress passed the Comprehensive Environmental Response, Compensation, and Liability Act (CERCLA). CERCLA´s environmental programs and initiatives are referred to as the Superfund: hazardous sites were identified and federal financing was allocated to remediate them. The Environmental Protection Agency (EPA) established a Hazard Ranking system and a National Priorities List in 1981 and 1982, respectively.

On September 8, 1983, the Tar Creek site was designated as a Superfund site, with the US Geological Survey, the Oklahoma Department of Environmental Quality (ODEQ), and the Quapaw Nation acting as the cleanup oversight agencies (though the EPA works as lead for USGS).

In 1984, work on the first Operable Unit (OU1) began. Twenty years later, in 2004, the state of Oklahoma enacted the "Oklahoma Plan For Tar Creek". By 2006, most of this money was allocated to a buy out and relocation program of residents of the area, because of the immediate health hazards to people still living there.

== Health and environmental hazards ==
"Dry" and "wet" methods were used by mining companies to extract pure lead from ore. Dry methods produced chat piles, large mounds of mining waste. Wet methods required tailing ponds to process ore into a usable product. The Oklahoma Plan for Tar Creek claimed around 75 million tons of chat piles exist, while the exact amount of tailings is unknown. It was not uncommon for children in the area to play around the chat piles, such as riding bikes up and down the large dune-like piles, or swimming in waters contaminated by chat dust or groundwater effects. Some of the piles were used by school students as sites for track practice.

Lead poisoning is especially hazardous to children under six years of age. High levels of lead at this age can produce impaired neurological development that results in lifelong problems. A 1996 study showed 43% of children ages 1–5 in the Superfund area had blood lead concentrations above the threshold considered dangerous by federal standards; more recent reports show this number to be lower. Another indication of hazard is the 24% miscarriage rate for women in the area, compared to a national average of 10%.

Empty mines presented an immediate danger due to mine collapses. One collapse in 1967 took nine homes.

Between 2002 and 2011, a study was conducted in the Tar Creek area on new mothers and their infants. The researchers measured manganese concentrations in maternal blood and umbilical cord samples at the time of birth, and they assessed the infant's neurodevelopment at two years of age. The study found an inverse correlation between blood manganese concentration of the mothers and neurodevelopment scores of their infants.

=== Damage to water resources and aquatic life ===
To keep groundwater from saturating the mines during the active period, water was pumped out of mines. This created a large depression where mining activities occurred. Waste materials and poor-quality ore were stored in mined-out portions, or exploration holes dug to map out mining areas, rather than being removed from the mines. These waste materials reacted with moist air and oxidized. When mining ceased in the 1960s, so did the active pumping of water from the mines. When water flowed back into the depressions, the mines flooded, and water reacted with the oxidized and now more reactive heavy metals left over. Eventually, so much water filled the mines that some water traveled to the surface, forming "springs" of contaminated water at the site of the exploratory drilling holes. In 1979, the first contaminated springs of water were documented.

In 1980, Picher first recorded contaminated water drawn from the town's aquifer.

Lead has marked adverse environmental effects in aquatic systems. Water from the region eventually drains into the Grand Lake o' the Cherokees, which has raised lead levels. A health advisory warns people to limit the number of fish they consume from this area.

Estimates in 1982 showed lead and cadmium levels in the underground aquifer of Picher were five times the national standards for drinking water. Mine water has to be treated to prevent its contaminating other clean water sources, such as nearby Grand Lake, which already has elevated levels of lead due to mining activities. Photosynthetic organisms in the water have no means to dispose of heavy metals they absorb and thus accumulate these. Any animal or fish that feeds on this primary producer accumulates the higher concentrations of these contaminants, as the primary producer has a higher concentration of heavy metals relative to the water. Secondary and tertiary consumers accumulate even higher concentrations of such metals in a process called biomagnification). Since humans consume fish rather than phytoplankton, they are considered a secondary consumer, and are at high risk of lead poisoning from fish taken from contaminated lakes.

== Clean up, 1983–present day ==
Since the passage of CERCLA, numerous clean-up efforts have been made in the area. Some of the surface water contamination was dealt with in the 1980s and 1990s. In 2000, Governor Frank Keating commissioned development of a cleanup plan, later known as the "Oklahoma Plan". In 2002, DEQ studied fish from waters in the Tri-State mining district. Tar Creek issued a fish consumption advisory.

The State of Oklahoma restored 329 acres of contaminated land in 2005. The following year it offered a voluntary buyout to affected families with children, in order to support their relocation to other, safer areas. The EPA got involved in 2010, offering additional voluntary buyouts and conducting additional cleanup.

The Oklahoma Plan for Tar Creek has listed four main objectives in the process: improving surface water quality, reducing exposure to lead dust, attenuating mine hazards, and land reclamation.

The University of Oklahoma's Department of Civil Engineering and Environmental Science has implemented a 1.2 million dollar passive water treatment system. The system bioremediates ground water from abandoned mines using a series of ponds to naturally remove lead, zinc, cadmium and iron from the water. It discharges into a tributary of Tar Creek. It uses gravity and renewable energy to flow water through a filtration system, composed of aerobic and anaerobic bacteria treatments, and periodic oxidation of treated waters. It has greatly reduced heavy metals in treated waters.

To reduce lead dust, the Oklahoma plan proposes to pave chat roads and otherwise encapsulate chat. A chat and asphalt mixture may also be used to fill mines, which will reduce the threat of mine hazards—namely, the collapse of mines and/or the exposure to lead due to open or collapsed mines.

Finally, the plan calls to restore and revegetate the land damaged by mining activities. New soil will be brought in to replace removed soil. One 2011 estimate claims an additional 3.2 million dollars will be sufficient to remediate the more than 400 mining sites remaining in the area.

The municipality of Picher was officially dissolved or unincorporated in November 2013. This followed a marked decline in population both from buyouts and from damage by the 2008 tornado.

In 2017 local residents criticized former EPA chief and Oklahoma native Scott Pruitt for his part in how the 33-year cleanup has been conducted.

On September 17, 2019, the EPA, in cooperation with the state of Oklahoma and the Quapaw Nation, released the Final Tar Creek Strategic Plan to advance cleanup of the Tar Creek Superfund site. The EPA indicated while great progress had been made, much work was yet to be done. The Plan was a commitment to accelerate the cleanup by an increase in annual funding to this purpose.

== Representation in other media ==
A 2009 documentary film, Tar Creek, written, directed, and narrated by Matt Myers, covers the gamut of the issues related to the Tar Creek Superfund site. It identifies lead poisoning, mine waste, acid mine water, sinkholes, and governmental practices showing racism against the Quapaw Tribe, downstream expansion of the Superfund site, and the eventual federal buyout of the residents of the area. During the fall of 2010, Tar Creek toured to many of the nation's existing Superfund sites as part of the Superfund Screening Tour. Universities, organizations, churches, and schools used the story of Tar Creek to discuss what could happen in their communities.

A musical about the Superfund site, The Picher Project, was conceived and directed by Quentin Madia. It debuted at Feinstein's/54 Below in 2019 and was later staged at Dixon Place in New York in the fall of 2023.

== See also ==
- List of Superfund sites in Oklahoma
