= Watermelon Man =

Watermelon Man may refer to:

- "Watermelon Man" (composition), 1962 composition written by Herbie Hancock
- Watermelon Man (film), 1970 American comedy directed by Melvin Van Peebles
