= Plug-in electric vehicles in Oklahoma =

As of June 2021, there were 3,410 electric vehicles registered in Oklahoma.

In 2019, Oklahoma was ranked by YourMechanic as the best state in the U.S. for electric vehicle ownership.

== Government policy ==
In 2021, the state government introduced an annual registration fee of $110 for electric vehicles, and $82 for plug-in hybrid vehicles; this fee will take effect in 2024.

In 2021, the state government introduced a tax of $0.03/kWh on electricity used for electric vehicle charging.

== Charging stations ==
As of 2021, there were about 1,000 charging stations in Oklahoma.

The Infrastructure Investment and Jobs Act, signed into law in November 2021, allocates US$66.3 million to charging stations in Oklahoma.

== Manufacturing ==
Many politicians, including Governor Kevin Stitt, have promoted the state's capacity for electric vehicle manufacturing.

== By region ==
=== Oklahoma City ===
As of 2021, there were 240 charging stations in Oklahoma City.

=== Tulsa ===
As of 2022, there were four electric vehicles in the fleet of the Metropolitan Tulsa Transit Authority.
