= Watermelon Creek (Anderson County, South Carolina) =

Stream in Anderson County, South Carolina, U.S.

Coordinates: 34.5727353°N 82.5380905°W

Watermelon Creek is a stream in Anderson County, South Carolina.

The creek was named for the watermelons grown on its shores by a nearby Native American tribe.
