= Tar Creek (film) =

- Directed by: Matt Myers
- Written by: Matt Myers
- Produced by: Tanya Beer; Ron & Cara Beer
- Narrated by: Matt Myers
- Cinematography: Robert Billings
- Music by: Watermelon Slim
- Release date: August 13, 2009
- Running time: 73 minutes
- Country: United States
- Language: English

Tar Creek is a 2009 feature-length environmental documentary about the Tar Creek Superfund Site, which at one time was considered the worst environmental disaster in the United States. It was directed by Matt Myers, who also wrote the film's script and served as its narrator.

== Synopsis ==
The documentary looks at the Tar Creek Superfund Site and chronicles the long-term effects of mining, tribal relations, United States Environmental Protection Agency management. The land within the perimeters of this environmental disaster was bad enough that the federal government bought out the homes of citizens living there and moved them away.

== Reception ==
The Library Journal rated the film favorably, writing "This grim exploration of our toxic legacy doesn't spare mine owners, bureaucrats, or politicians. Although regulations are much stricter today, viewers will ask themselves whether any agency is willing or able to remediate former mine sites properly." The Journalism & Mass Communication Educator wrote a predominantly positive review where they praised the film for its attention to personal details while also noting "The film’s interviews are striking, but lack a sense of coherence." The Capital Times was slightly more mixed in their review, stating "Myers is a folksy and poetic narrator, although the tone of the film gets needlessly preachy toward the end. He found a good selection of people to interview – scientists, social workers, politicians, elderly ex-miners, displaced residents – but the selection leaned a little too heavy on officials. I would have liked to hear more from a family or child's perspective."
