= National Register of Historic Places listings in Ottawa County, Oklahoma =

Location of Ottawa County in Oklahoma

This is a list of the National Register of Historic Places listings in Ottawa County, Oklahoma.

This is intended to be a complete list of the properties and districts on the National Register of Historic Places in Ottawa County, Oklahoma, United States. The locations of National Register properties and districts for which the latitude and longitude coordinates are included below, may be seen in a map.

There are 21 properties and districts listed on the National Register in the county.

This National Park Service list is complete through NPS recent listings posted August 7, 2026.

== Current listings ==
	Name on the Register	Image	Date listed	Location	City or town	Description
1	Cities Service Station		February 23, 1995 (#95000039)	Junction of 1st St. and Central Ave. 36°41′33″N 94°57′56″W	Afton	Structure since removed or modified so heavily as to be unrecognizable.
2	Coleman Theatre	Coleman Theatre	May 19, 1983 (#83002114)	103 N. Main St. 36°52′34″N 94°52′39″W	Miami	
3	George L. Coleman Sr. House	George L. Coleman Sr. House	May 9, 1983 (#83002113)	1001 Rockdale St. 36°53′00″N 94°51′40″W	Miami	
4	Commerce Building/Hancock Building	Commerce Building/Hancock Building	May 9, 1983 (#83002115)	103 E. Central; 36°52′28″N 94°52′35″W	Miami	
5	Dobson Family House	Dobson Family House	June 8, 2011 (#11000340)	106 A St., SW; 36°52′24″N 94°52′43″W	Miami	
6	Horse Creek Bridge	Horse Creek Bridge	February 23, 1995 (#95000040)	Junction of the former U.S. Route 66 and Horse Creek; 36°41′49″N 94°57′23″W	Afton	
7	Hudson Service Station		August 18, 2025 (#100012147)	218 South Main Street; 36°52′17″N 94°52′40″W	Miami	
8	John Patrick McNaughton Barn	John Patrick McNaughton Barn	December 27, 1991 (#91001903)	Ottawa County Road 137, 1.5 miles north of State Highway 10; 36°53′53″N 94°47′07″W	Quapaw	
9	Miami Downtown Historic District	Miami Downtown Historic District	May 29, 2009 (#09000357)	Roughly the 100 block of N. Main St., the 0 block of S. Main St., the 0 blocks of E. and W. Central Ave., and the 0 block of SE. A St. 36°52′29″N 94°52′39″W	Miami	
10	Miami Marathon Oil Company Service Station	Miami Marathon Oil Company Service Station	February 23, 1995 (#95000041)	331 S. Main St. 36°52′11″N 94°52′37″W	Miami	
11	Miami Original Nine-Foot Section of Route 66 Roadbed	Miami Original Nine-Foot Section of Route 66 Roadbed	February 9, 1995 (#94001610)	From the junction of E St., SW. and 130th St. to the former U.S. Route 66; 36°49′22″N 94°54′31″W	Miami	
12	Modoc Mission Church and Cemetery	Modoc Mission Church and Cemetery	February 15, 1980 (#80003293)	Southeast of Miami; 36°51′53″N 94°39′43″W	Miami	
13	Narcissa D-X Gas Station		December 5, 2003 (#03001240)	15050 S. Highway 69; 36°48′03″N 94°55′36″W	Miami	
14	Nine Tribes Tower		June 21, 2022 (#100007856)	205 B St. NE; 36°52′42″N 94°52′32″W	Miami	
15	Ottawa County Courthouse		March 3, 2004 (#04000122)	102 East Central; 36°52′27″N 94°52′33″W	Miami	Demolished in 2008
16	Peoria Indian School	Peoria Indian School	March 21, 1983 (#83002116)	East of Miami; 36°54′52″N 94°44′31″W	Miami	
17	Peoria Tribal Cemetery	Peoria Tribal Cemetery	March 21, 1983 (#83002117)	East of Miami; 36°54′01″N 94°45′39″W	Miami	
18	Riviera Courts-Motel	Riviera Courts-Motel	May 27, 2004 (#04000524)	1 mile west of Main on U.S. Route 69A; 36°51′56″N 94°54′01″W	Miami	
19	Tri-State Zinc and Lead Ore Producers Association Office	Tri-State Zinc and Lead Ore Producers Association Office	March 7, 2003 (#03000097)	508 N. Connell Ave. 36°59′28″N 94°49′52″W	Picher	Destroyed by arson in April 2015
20	Isaiah Walker House		March 20, 2017 (#100000769)	69491 E. 134th Rd. 36°49′19″N 94°38′02″W	Wyandotte	
21	Waylan's Ku-Ku Burger		July 16, 2026 (#100013240)	915 North Main Street; 36°53′10″N 94°52′40″W	Miami	

== See also ==
- List of National Historic Landmarks in Oklahoma
- National Register of Historic Places listings in Oklahoma
