= Coleman Theatre =

- U.S. National Register of Historic Places
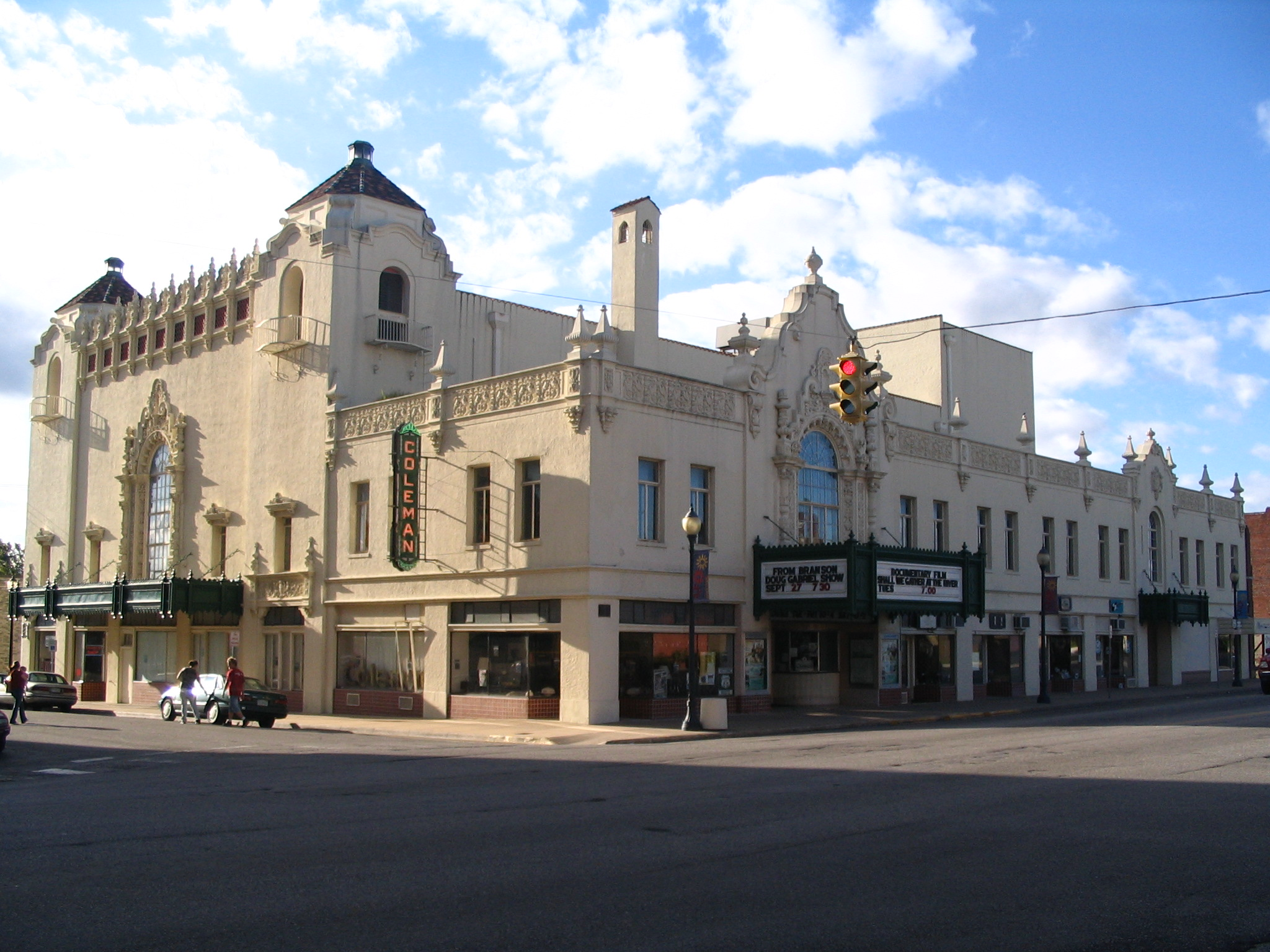

- Location within Oklahoma Location within the United States
- Location: 103 N. Main St., Miami, Oklahoma
- Coordinates: 36.8764°N 94.8778°W
- Area: 7.5 acres (3.0 ha)
- Built: 1929
- Built by: Rucks-Brandt Construction Co.
- Architect: Boller Brothers
- Architectural style: Spanish Colonial Revival
- NRHP reference No.: 83002114
- Added to NRHP: May 18, 1983

The Coleman Theatre is a historic performance venue and movie house located on historic U.S. Route 66 in Miami, Oklahoma. Built in 1929 for George Coleman, a local mining magnate, it has a distinctive Spanish Colonial Revival exterior, and an elaborate Louis XV interior. It was billed as the most elaborate theater between Dallas and Kansas City at the time of its opening, and played host to vaudeville acts, musical groups, and movies.

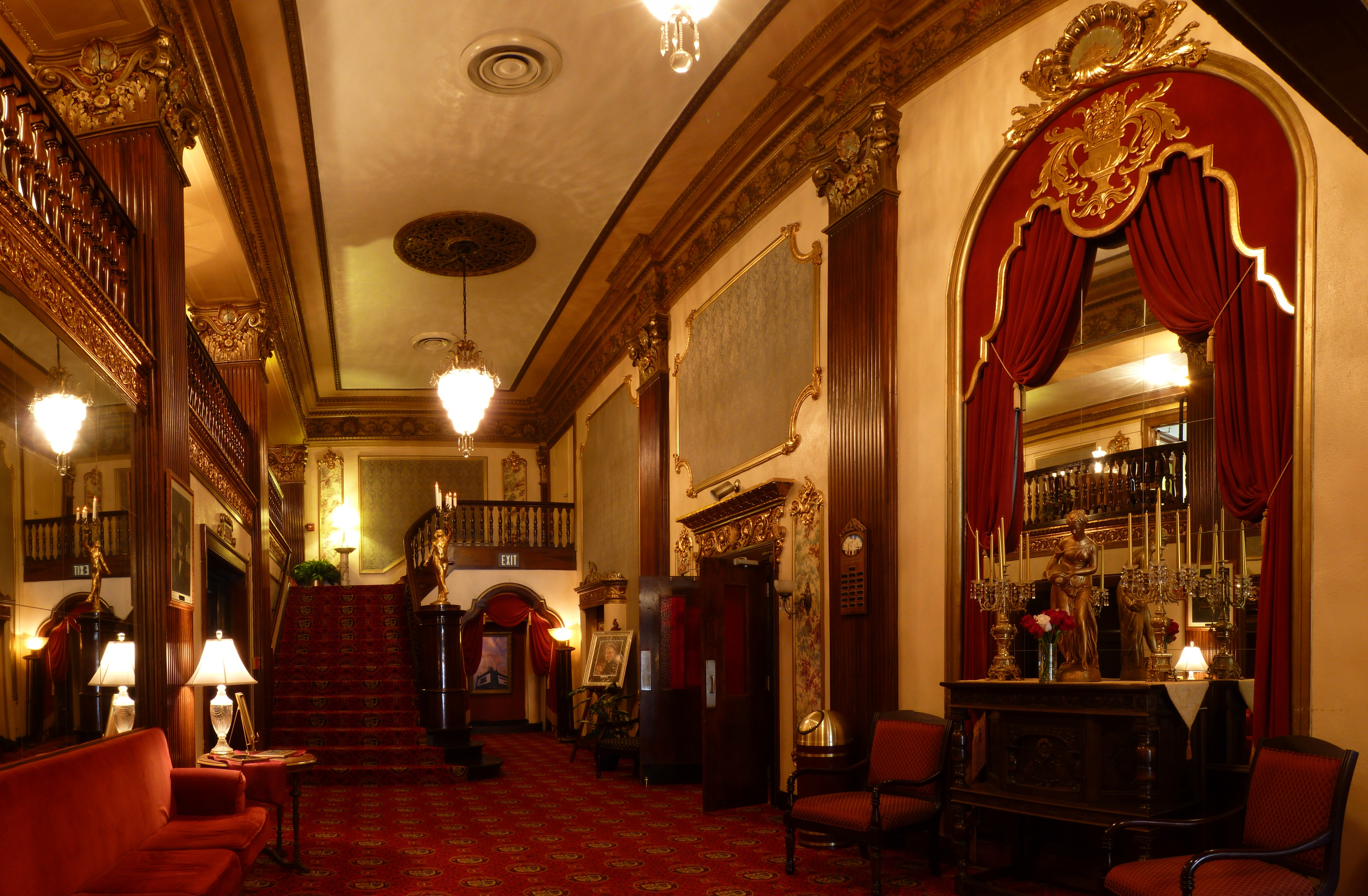
Interior

It was listed on the National Register of Historic Places in 1983.

Like more than 100 other theaters in the Midwest, it was designed by the Boller Brothers architectural firm of Kansas City, Missouri.

It was built by Rucks-Brandt Construction Co.

It is a 120 by 150 feet (37 m × 46 m) theater/commercial structure. It was originally intended to include commercial shops on the first floors of its east and south sides, where the entrances to the theater were located, and to include the Masonic Lodge Hall on the eastern half of its second floor.

The theater features a ”Mighty Wurlitzer” pipe organ built in 1928 and costing $35,000, and the overall complex includes the Coleman Ballroom, now event space, and Celebrity Park, a small park with a fountain and benches that also features a “Wall of Fame” honoring local community leaders.

The theater offers tours and various live productions, and several venues inside the complex can be rented for events.

== See also ==
- George L. Coleman Sr. House, also NRHP-listed in Miami
- National Register of Historic Places listings in Ottawa County, Oklahoma
