= Louisa Hodge =

American journalist

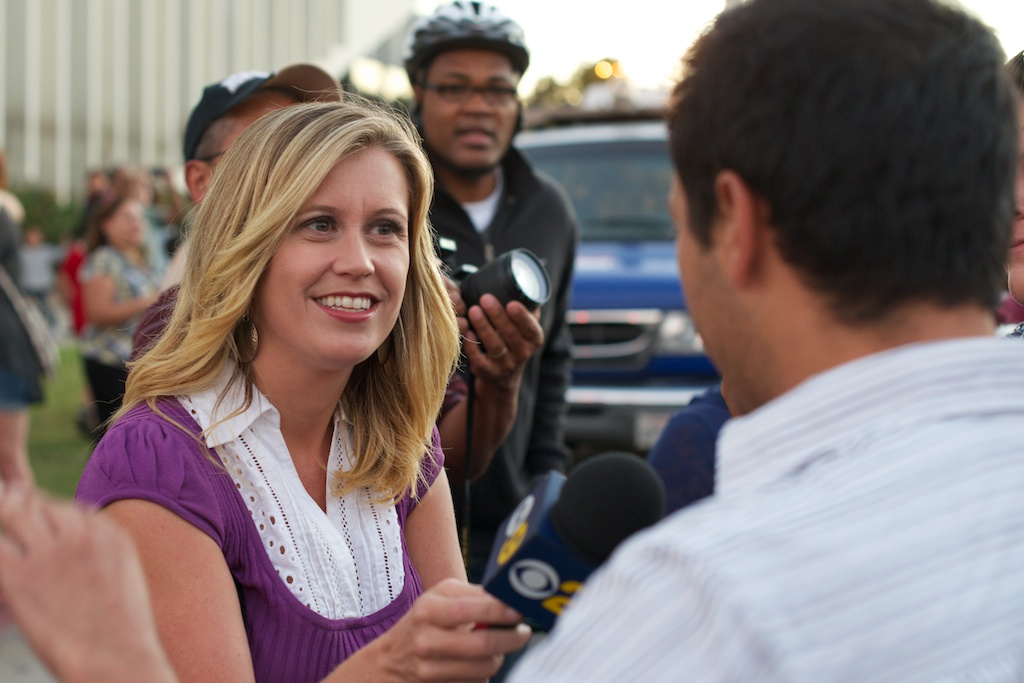
- Hodge doing an interview during the Space Shuttle Endeavour travel to the California Science Museum

Louisa Hodge is a meteorologist and Emmy award-winning general assignment reporter for KCBS-2/KCAL-9 at CBS Studio Center in Studio City, California. She also hosted an adventure series where you could see her taking part in adventurous sports and activities in the Los Angeles area. Previously she spent two years working as a meteorologist/anchor/reporter for Independent TV KRON-4 in San Francisco and prior to KRON she was a TV anchor and reporter for Tribune Fox affiliate KTXL in Sacramento, CA. She was a weeknight reporter and weekend weather anchor for Fox 40 News at 10 with Teri Cox and Joe Orlando. Prior to her arrival at KTXL in November 2005, she was a co-host for "Wake Up!" on KNVN and KHSL-TV in Chico, CA as well as a Field reporter and weather reporter for NCN for a period of time since former anchor Maureen Naylor left NCN for ABC O&O KFSN in Fresno, CA. Prior to KNVN/KHSL, Louisa worked at WPTV in West Palm Beach, FL as a photographer and worked as an intern at Good Morning America.
