= Miami, Oklahoma =

- City
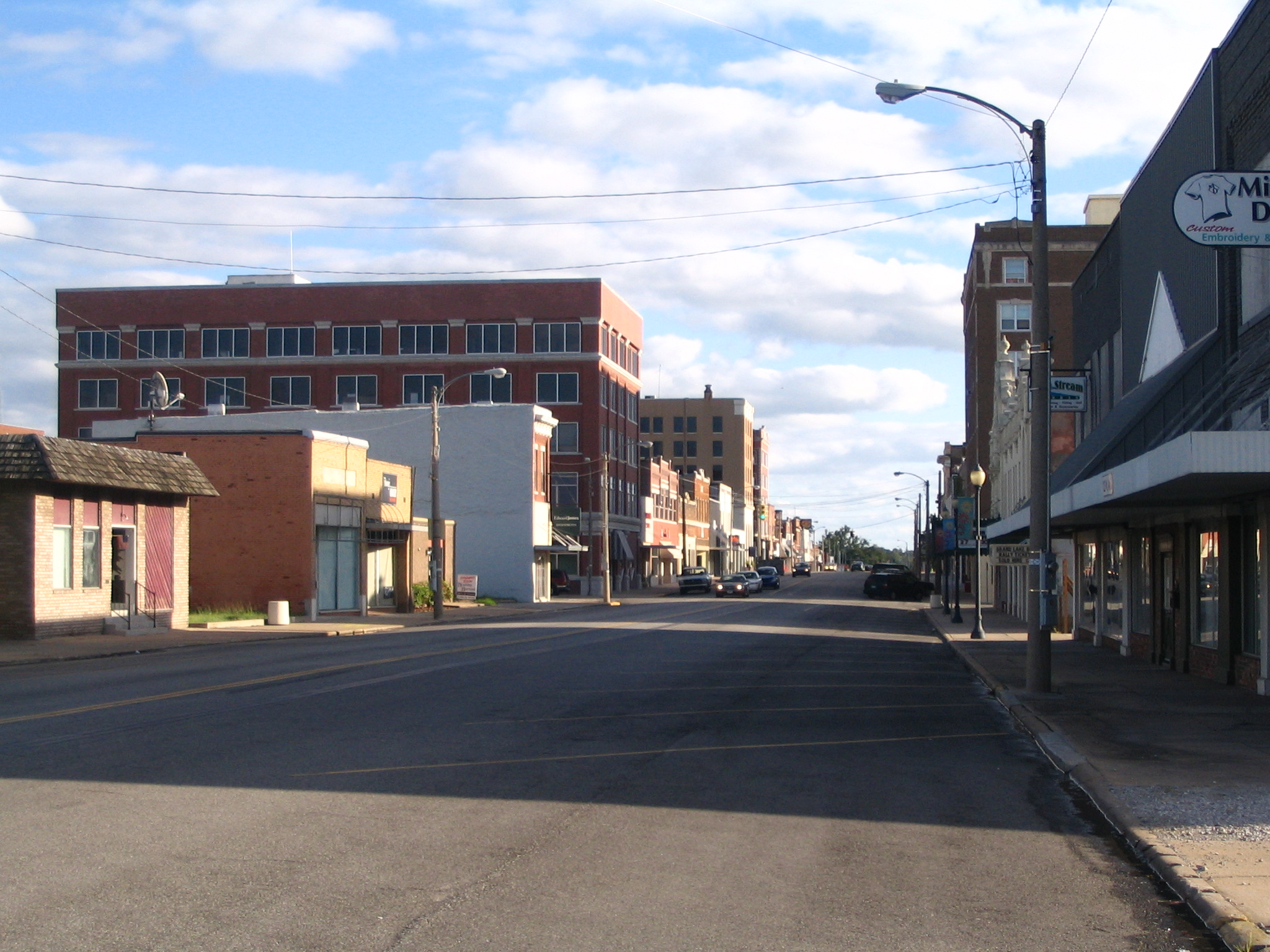
- Downtown Miami (2008)

- Location within Ottawa County and Oklahoma
- Coordinates: 36°53′16″N 94°52′16″W
- Country: United States
- State: Oklahoma
- County: Ottawa

Government
  - Mayor: Bless Parker (R)

Area
  - Total: 11.18 sq mi (28.96 km^{2})
  - Land: 11.10 sq mi (28.74 km^{2})
  - Water: 0.085 sq mi (0.22 km^{2})
- Elevation: 778 ft (237 m)

Population (2020)
  - Total: 12,969
  - Density: 1,169/sq mi (451.3/km^{2})
- Time zone: UTC-6 (CST)
  - Summer (DST): UTC-5 (CDT)
- ZIP code: 74354-74355
- Area code: 539/918
- FIPS code: 40-48000
- GNIS feature ID: 2411093
- Website: www.miamiok.gov

Miami (/maɪˈæmə/ my-AM-ə) is a city in and the county seat of Ottawa County, Oklahoma, United States, founded in 1891. Lead and zinc mining were established by 1918, causing the area's economy to boom.

This area was part of Indian Territory. Miami is the capital of the federally recognized Miami Tribe of Oklahoma (after which it is named), the Modoc Tribe of Oklahoma, the Ottawa Tribe of Oklahoma, the Peoria Tribe of Indians, and the Shawnee Tribe. As of the 2020 census, its population was 12,969.

== History ==
The city was founded in an unusual way, compared to other towns established in Indian Territory. Per the Encyclopedia of Oklahoma History and Culture, "... it was settled in a business-like way by men of vision who looked into the future and saw possibilities. It didn't just grow. It was carefully planned."

W. C. Lykins petitioned the U.S. Congress to pass legislation on March 3, 1891, to establish the town. He met with Thomas F. Richardville, chief of the Miami Tribe of Oklahoma, who agreed to meet in turn with the U.S. Indian Commission and the Ottawa Tribe. That meeting resulted in Congress authorizing the secretary of the United States Department of the Interior to approve the townsite purchase from the Ottawa. Lykins, Richardville, and Manford Pooler, chief of the Ottawa, are identified in historical accounts as "fathers of Miami". Lykins' company, the Miami Town Company, bought 588 acres (238 ha) of land from the Ottawa for $10 an acre. On June 25–26, 1891 they held an auction of lots. In 1895, Miami incorporated and had more than 800 residents.

The discovery of rich deposits of lead and zinc under Quapaw land a few miles north caused Miami to boom. In 1907, at the time of statehood, its population was 1,893. As mining increased and more mills were built, the population more than tripled to 6,802 by 1920.

Miami was on the route of the Jefferson Highway established in 1915, with that international road running more than 2,300 miles (3,700 km) from Winnipeg, Manitoba, Canada, across the border and to New Orleans, Louisiana. US Route 66 in Oklahoma also passed through Miami. An historic section of the Route 66 roadbed is marked in Miami.

It is the capital of the Miami Tribe of Oklahoma (after which it is named), Modoc Tribe of Oklahoma, Ottawa Tribe of Oklahoma, Peoria Tribe of Indians, and Shawnee Tribe.

== Geography ==
According to the United States Census Bureau, the city has a total area of 9.8 square miles (25 km^{2}), of which 0.1 square miles (0.26 km^{2}) (0.82%) is covered by water.

Miami is located about 90 miles (140 km) north-northeast of Tulsa, 190 miles (310 km) north-northeast of Oklahoma City, about 20 miles (32 km) west-southwest of Joplin, Missouri, or about 95 miles (153 km) west-southwest of Springfield, Missouri.

=== Flooding ===
Miami is located on the Neosho River, and was severely affected by the Great Flood of 1951. The town has flooded more than two dozen times since the 1990s, most recently during the 2019 Arkansas River floods. Town residents and neighboring Native American groups have objected to maintaining high water levels on the river at Pensacola Dam and its popular vacation area, Grand Lake, on the grounds that when water backs up downstream, it can increase Miami's flooding problems.

== Demographics ==
Historical population
Census	Pop.	Note	%±
1900	1,527		—
1910	2,907		90.4%
1920	6,802		134.0%
1930	8,064		18.6%
1940	8,345		3.5%
1950	11,801		41.4%
1960	12,869		9.1%
1970	13,880		7.9%
1980	14,237		2.6%
1990	13,142		−7.7%
2000	13,704		4.3%
2010	13,570		−1.0%
2020	12,969		−4.4%
2024 (est.)	12,886		−0.6%

=== 2020 census ===
As of the 2020 census, Miami had a population of 12,969. The median age was 35.5 years; 23.8% of residents were under 18 and 18.0% were 65 or older. For every 100 females, there were 93.8 males, and for every 100 females 18 and over, there were 89.8 males age 18 and over.

About 99.0% of residents lived in urban areas, while 1.0% lived in rural areas.

Of the 5,046 households in Miami, 31.4% had children under 18 living in them, 37.9% were married-couple households, 19.3% were households with a male householder and no spouse or partner present, and 33.4% were households with a female householder and no spouse or partner present. About 33.4% of all households were made up of individuals and 16.9% had someone living alone who was 65 or older.

Of the 5,825 housing units, 13.4% were vacant. Among occupied housing units, 56.3% were owner-occupied and 43.7% were renter-occupied. The homeowner vacancy rate was 3.9% and the rental vacancy rate was 10.2%.

In 2020, about one in four residents lived in poverty.

Racial composition as of the 2020 census
Race	Percent
White	63.7%
Black or African American	1.8%
American Indian and Alaska Native	17.5%
Asian	0.5%
Native Hawaiian and Other Pacific Islander	1.6%
Some other race	2.2%
Two or more races	12.7%
Hispanic or Latino (of any race)	5.6%

=== 2010 census ===
As of the 2010 census, 13,570 people, 5,315 households, and 3,337 families resided in the city. The 2010 population represented a 1.0% decline from 13,704 at the 2000 census. The population density was 1,258.7 inhabitants per square mile (486.0/km^{2}). The racial makeup of the city was 68.9% White, 1.3% African American, 17.1% Native American, 0.5% Asian, 2.0% Pacific Islander, 2.1% from other races, and 8% from two or more races. Hispanics or Latinos of any race made up 4.8% of the population.

Of the 5,315 households, 31.9% had children under 18 living with them, 44.6% were married couples living together, 15% had a female householder with no husband present, and 36.2% were not families. Individuals living alone accounted for 31.9% of households and individuals 65 or older living alone accounted for 14.7% of households. The average household size was 2.46 and the average family size was 3.07.

In the city, the age distribution was 24.7% under 18, 57.1% from 18 to 64, and 18.2% who were 65 or older. The median age was 35.8 years. The population was 53.2% female and 46.8% male.

The median income for a household in the city was $34,561 and for a family was $42,313. Males had a median income of $32,699 versus $25,320 for females. About 14.2% of families and 19.2% of the population were below the poverty line.

=== 2000 census ===
As of the 2000 census, 13,704 people lived in the city.

== Government ==
Local government in Miami consists of an elected mayor at-large and four councilmen representing four wards.

- Mayor – Bless Parker
- Ward one councilman – Brian Estep
- Ward two councilman – Kevin Dunkel
- Ward three councilman – Dwain Sundberg
- Ward four councilman – Brad Williams

As of 2023, the city is represented in the Oklahoma House of Representatives by Republican Steve Bashore, and in the Oklahoma Senate by Republican Micheal Bergstrom. The city lies within Oklahoma's 2nd congressional district, represented by Josh Brecheen since 2023.

== Transportation ==
Miami is on Interstate 44 and U.S. Route 69, and is approximately two miles (3.2 km) from U.S. Route 59.

Pelivan Transit, owned and operated by Grand Gateway EDA and Northeast Oklahoma Tribal Transit Consortium, provides a trolley loop in Miami, as well as certain on-demand bus services.

Miami is served by Miami Regional Airport (KMIO; FAA Identifier MIO), with a 5,020-foot (1,530 m) paved runway. Commercial air transportation is available from Joplin Regional Airport in Missouri, about 34 miles (55 km) northeast, or the larger, Tulsa International Airport, about 85 miles (137 km) southwest.

== Coleman Theatre and historical buildings ==
Miami and Ottawa County, together with nearby Delaware County, Oklahoma, to the south, attract numerous tourists to the state. These counties combined make up the third-largest tourism destination in the state, following only the Oklahoma City and Tulsa metropolitan areas.

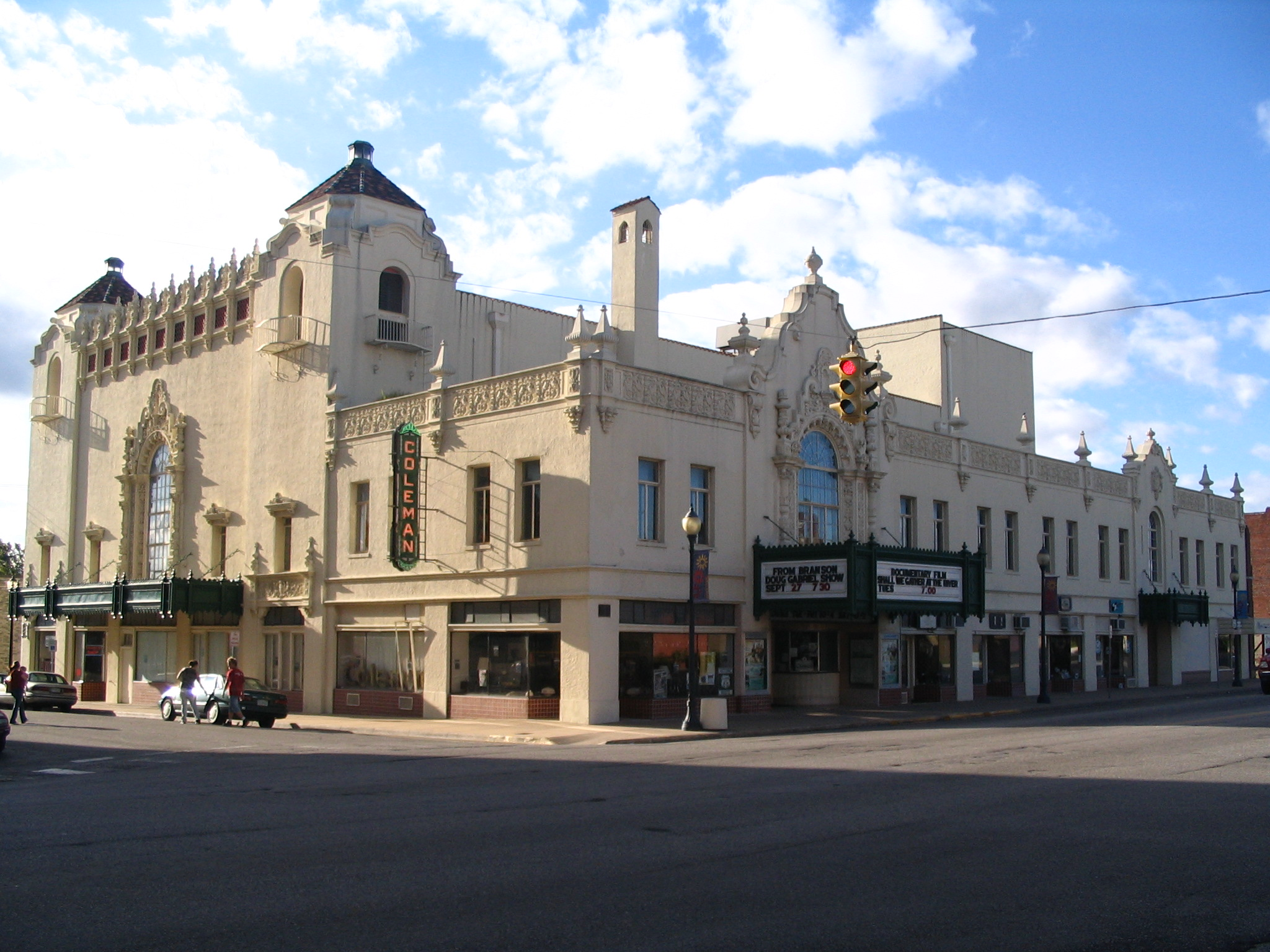
Coleman Theatre, 2008

Miami is home to the historic Coleman Theatre, located at 103 N. Main St. On April 18, 1929, the 1,600-seat Coleman Theatre enjoyed a grand opening as a luxurious movie theater of the time. Designed by the Boller Bros. and built by George L. Coleman Sr. at a cost of $600,000, the Louis XV interior includes gold leaf trim, silk damask panels, stained glass panels, marble accents, a carved mahogany staircase, Wurlitzer pipe organ, decorative plaster moldings, and bronze railings. While many changes in seeing movies in grand theaters have occurred, the building has been preserved and also serves as a venue for live performances. In 1959, a local nonprofit community group established the Miami Little Theatre. The community theater group presents five large-scale productions on the Coleman stage every year. In 1983, the Coleman Theatre was placed on the National Register of Historical Places for Ottawa County.

Other Miami structures are also listed on the National Register of Historical Places, including the George L. Coleman Sr. House, the Miami Marathon Oil Company Service Station, and the Miami Downtown Historic District.

== Education ==
Public schools serving most of Miami are managed by the Miami Public Schools district. The high school is Miami High School, whose mascot is the Wardog, which is unique to Miami and has not been adopted as a mascot by any other school in the United States.

A portion of northern Miami is within the Commerce Public Schools district.

Northeastern Oklahoma A&M College was accredited initially in 1925 by the North Central Association of Colleges and Schools. In addition to its certificate programs, it has working relationships with other higher-education institutions in the state to promote transfers of students seeking four-year college degrees. In 2015, the two-year community college had about 2,000 students.

== Sport ==
Northeastern Oklahoma A&M College fields teams in baseball, football, men's and women's basketball, men's and women's soccer, softball, women's volleyball, and men's wrestling. The football and soccer teams play at the 7,000 capacity Red Robertson Field. The NEO Fieldhouse is home to the basketball and wrestling teams, and Homa Thomas Field is the home stadium for the baseball team.

Other athletic facilities in Miami include the high school multipurpose field and softball field, a softball complex and a baseball complex in the southern part of the city, a park with a baseball field and tennis/pickleball courts, a grass football field, and a soccer complex located just south of the airport.

== Notable people ==
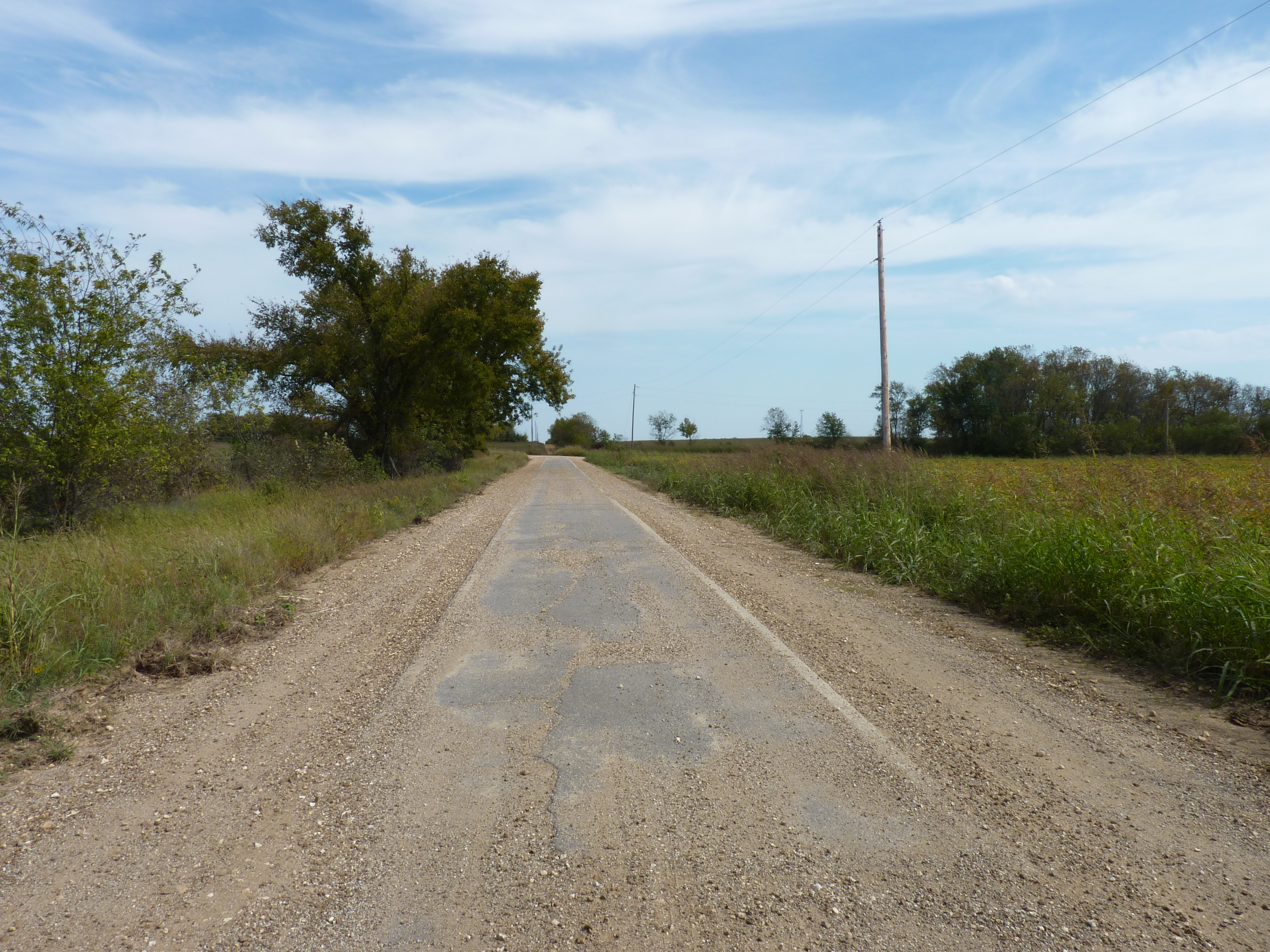
"Sidewalk highway" stretch of Route 66 near Miami, 2010

- Keith Anderson – musician
- Lucien Ballard - director of photography
- David Froman – actor
- Cassie Gaines – singer
- Steve Gaines – musician
- Karen Keith – politician
- Moscelyne Larkin - ballerina
- Vanessa Lillie – novelist
- Carol Littleton – film editor
- Mackenzie McKee - reality TV personality
- Charles R. Nesbitt – public servant
- Steve Owens – 1969 Heisman Trophy winner
- Don Porter - actor
- Julie Rieger - business executive - President 20th Century Fox
- Moriss Taylor – singer/TV host
- Keifer Thompson – musician
- Charles Banks Wilson – artist
- Glad Robinson Youse - composer

== Gallery ==
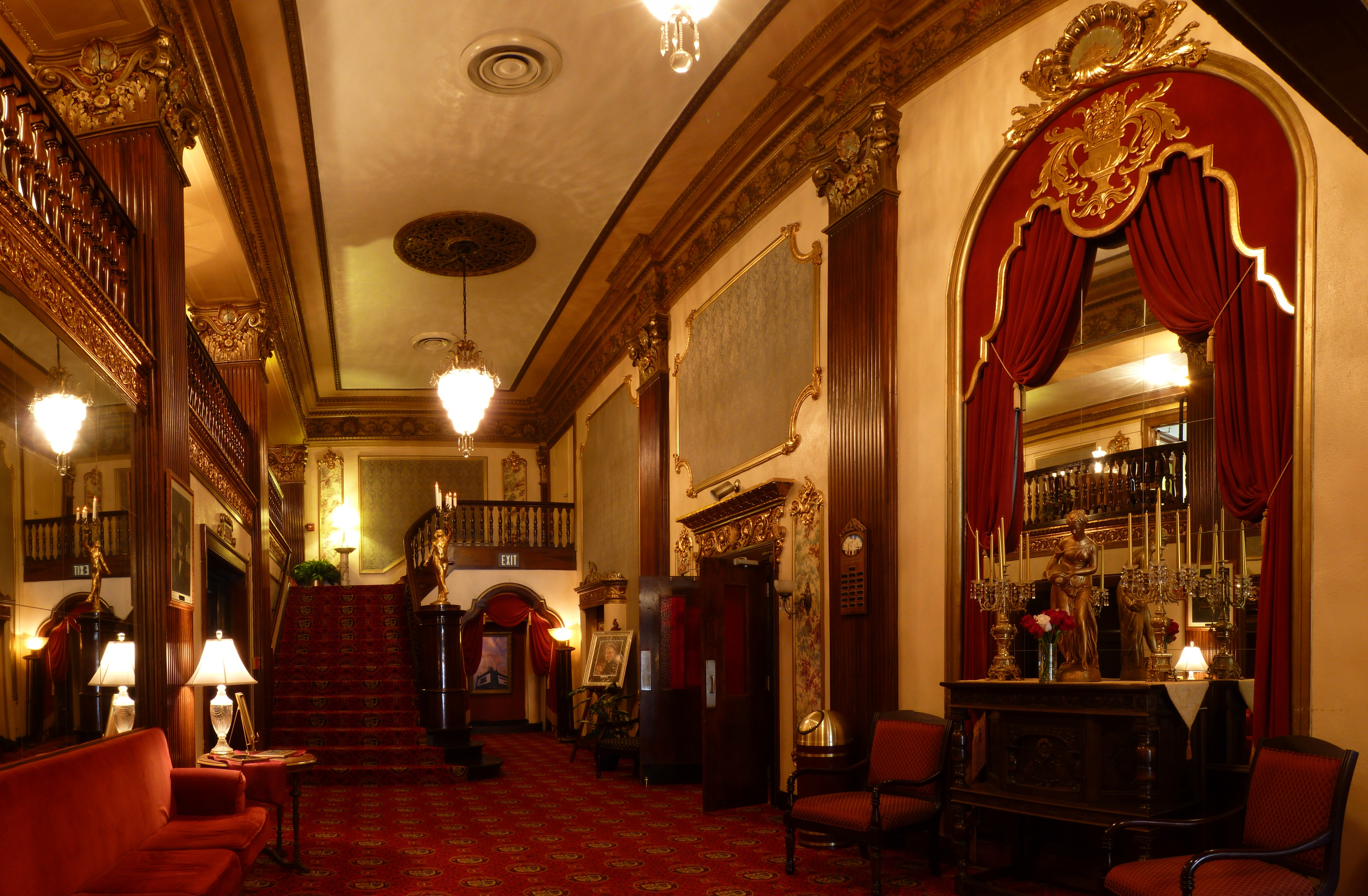
Interior of the Coleman Theatre

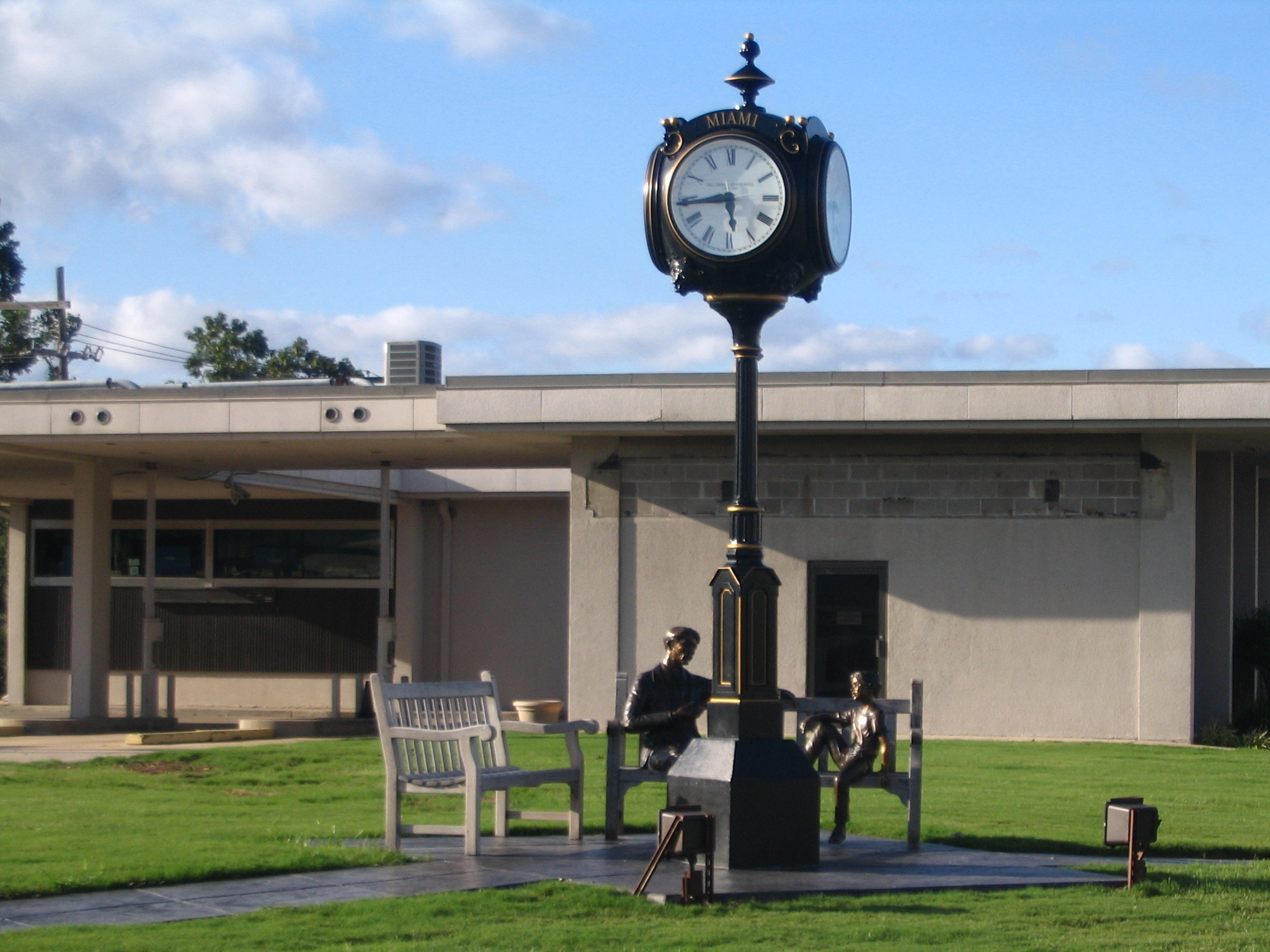
Clock and bench in downtown Miami

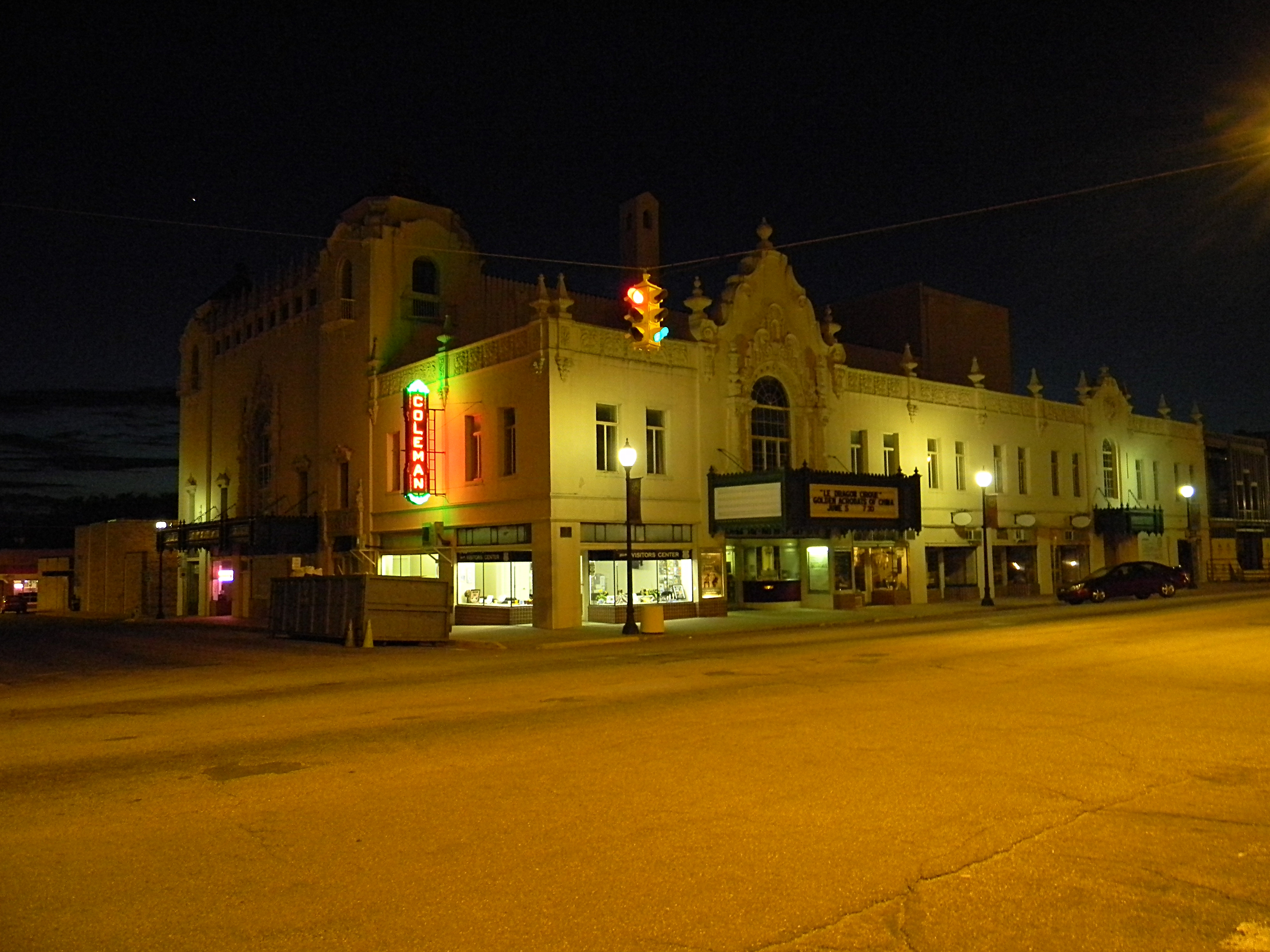
Coleman Theatre in downtown Miami at night

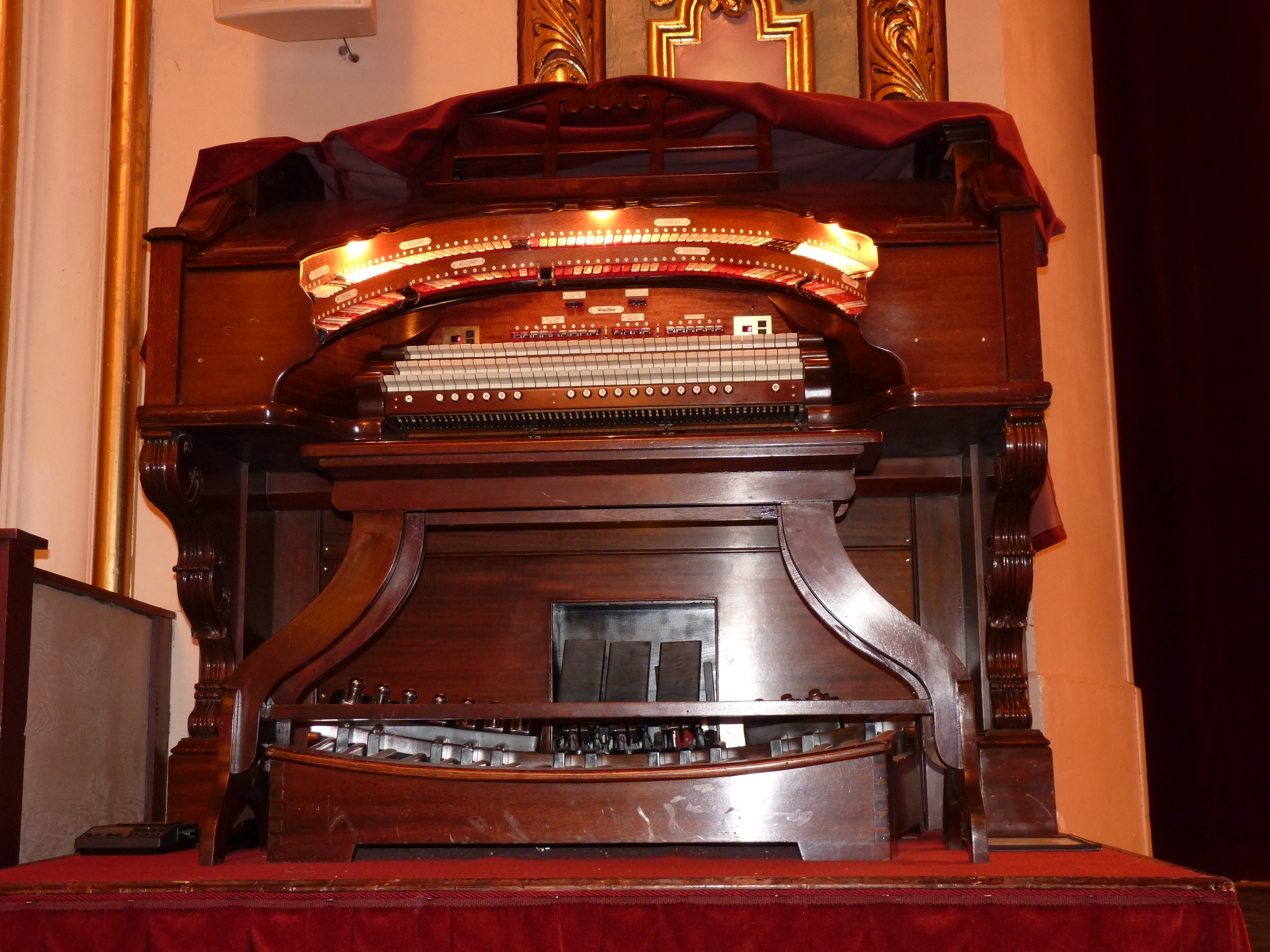
Original Wurlitzer organ in the Coleman Theatre

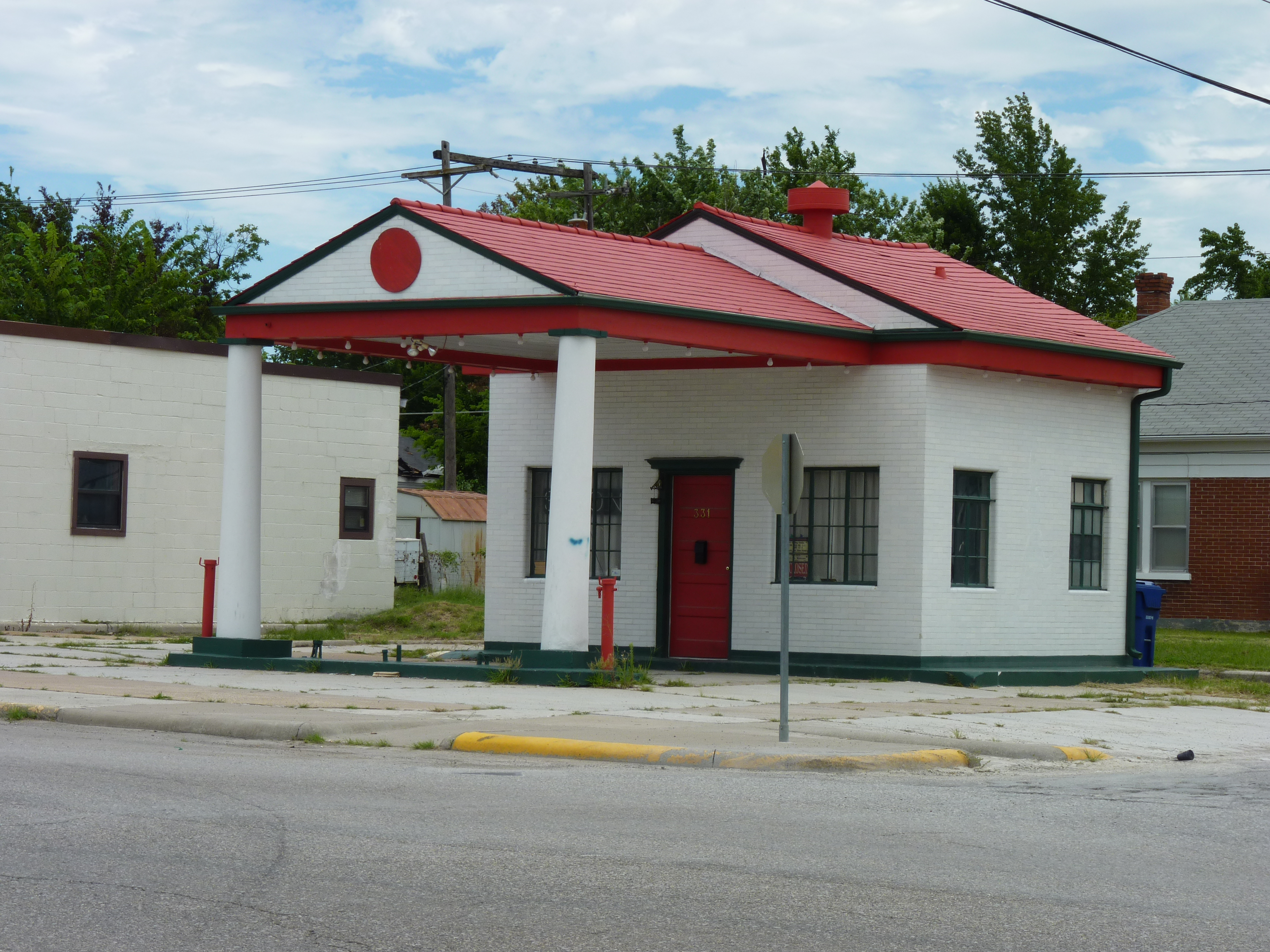
The former Miami Marathon Oil Company service station building was last used as a salon.

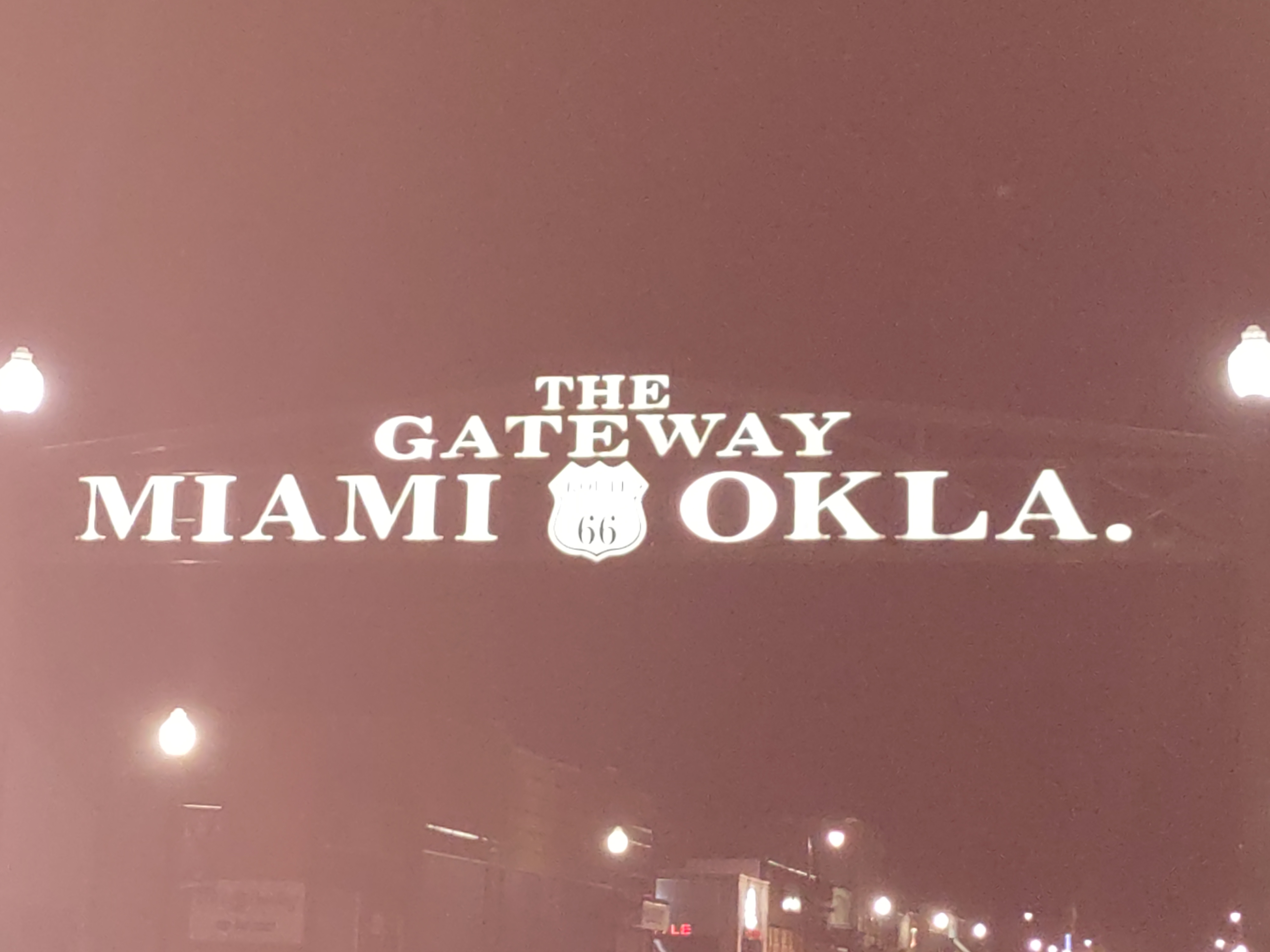
The Gateway Arch, Miami, Oklahoma, at night, not to be confused with one in St. Louis

== See also ==
- Miami Original Nine-Foot Section of Route 66 Roadbed
