= KHSL-TV =

Television station in Chico, California

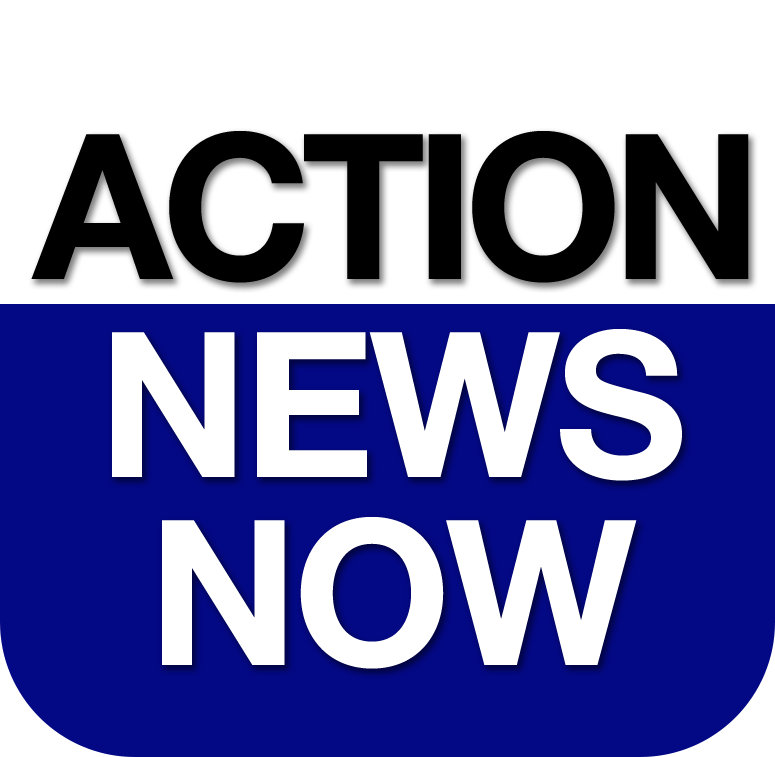
- Chico–Redding, California; United States
- City: Chico, California
- Channels: Digital: 36 (UHF); Virtual: 12
- Branding: CBS 12; Action News Now; Chico-Redding CW (12.2)

Programming
- Affiliations: 12.1: CBS; 12.2: CW+; for others, see § Technical information and subchannels

Ownership
- Owner: Allen Media Group; (California TV License Company, LLC)
- Sister stations: KNVN

History
- First air date: August 29, 1953
- Former channel numbers: Analog: 12 (VHF, 1953–2009); Digital: 43 (UHF, 1999–2018)
- Former affiliations: All secondary: ABC (1953–1978); NBC (1953–1956, 1978–1985); DuMont (1953–1955)
- Call sign meaning: Harry Smithson and Sidney Lewis (founders of KHSL radio)

Technical information
- Licensing authority: FCC
- Facility ID: 24508
- ERP: 170 kW
- HAAT: 461.9 m (1,515 ft)
- Transmitter coordinates: 39°57′28.6″N 121°42′52.9″W
- Translator(s): see § Translators

Links
- Public license information: Public file; LMS
- Website: www.actionnewsnow.com

KHSL-TV (channel 12) is a television station in Chico, California, United States, serving the Chico–Redding area as an affiliate of CBS and The CW Plus. It is owned by Allen Media Group in common operation with NBC/Telemundo affiliate KNVN (channel 24), a combination known as Action News Now. The two stations share studios on the corner of Eaton and Silverbell roads on the northwest side of Chico; KHSL is broadcast to the Chico area from Cohasset Ridge in Butte County and to Redding from South Fork Mountain northwest of Redding.

KHSL-TV was the first television station in the region, signing on in 1953 as the TV extension of Chico radio station KHSL (1290 AM). Its original transmitter site in Paradise, California, failed to adequately cover Redding, prompting it to relocate to Cohasset the next year. Under the ownership of the McClung family's Golden Empire Broadcasting Company, KHSL-TV became the leading station for news in the market. The McClungs owned the KHSL stations until 1994, when KHSL AM and other stations were split off and United Communications Corporation acquired the TV station.

Catamount Broadcasting acquired KHSL-TV in 1998 and began handling operations of KNVN in 2000. The newscasts of both stations initially retained separate presentation but were soon amalgamated into a single news service. KHSL-TV went through several owners in the 2010s and early 2020s and has been owned by Allen Media Group since 2020.

== History ==
=== The McClung years (1953–1994) ===
On July 5, 1952, the Golden Empire Broadcasting Company applied to build a new television station on channel 12 to serve Chico. The Federal Communications Commission (FCC) approved the construction permit on March 11, 1953, enabling work on KHSL-TV to begin. Just over a month later, the building to house the station's transmitter in Paradise was completed; work was also under way on the station's studio, which was located in a former auto garage at Fourth and Wall streets in Chico. The Chico Enterprise-Record shunned mention of the new television station, going as far as to remove references to KHSL in photography where warranted, fearing the new media outlet would dilute its revenue.

KHSL-TV began regular broadcasting on August 29, 1953. Several days earlier, it had put out its first test patterns, which were a particular disappointment to hopeful viewers in Redding. While Chico and Red Bluff enjoyed good reception from the site, the signal in Redding was weak and heavily affected by multipath ghosting. A local television dealer pushed to set up an early cable television system to provide good KHSL-TV pictures to Redding viewers from an antenna on South Fork Mountain, but the station made the point moot by instead moving its transmitter. The station began transmitting from the higher Cohasset Ridge in September 1954, adding an estimated 50,000 homes to its coverage area. Days later, the station suffered a control panel fire but was able to make repairs in time to air Game 2 of the 1954 World Series.

When it launched, KHSL-TV was an affiliate of CBS and NBC. The station joined the Pacific Coast regional network of ABC in October 1953 but was not formally named an ABC affiliate until June 1954. It was also affiliated with the DuMont Television Network by September 1954; that network closed in September 1955. KHSL-TV disaffiliated from NBC on July 31, 1956, retaining CBS and ABC; though it cited its heavy load of network programming, the next day, NBC programs moved to the new channel 7 (originally KVIP, now KRCR-TV) from Redding. In 1960, KVIP-TV and sister station KVIQ-TV in Eureka switched from primary NBC to primary ABC affiliates, though KRCR returned to primary NBC then switched back to primary ABC in 1974.

In its early years, KHSL-TV produced a number of local programs. The Paul Bunyan Show was noteworthy for being the springboard for actor Richard Kiel for a year in 1963; in addition to hosting the children's show, he was channel 12's merchandising director. Another early show that turned into a station fixture was The Moriss Taylor Show, hosted by Taylor—a country musician who for much of the time doubled as a DJ on KHSL radio. His program aired from 1956 to the mid-1990s. (Note: Sources vary on when The Moriss Taylor Show left the air, including 1995 and 1997.)

KHSL-TV remained at the Fourth and Wall studios in Chico for three decades until June 1984, when it moved into new facilities at Silverbell and Eaton roads. The site, part of a combined facility with KHSL radio, offered twice as much room for the stations. The original studios were used to start a new station for Chico, NBC affiliate KCPM (channel 24, now KNVN), which began in 1985.

In October 1994, KHSL-TV was sold to United Communications Corporation, which owned media properties in Minnesota, Wisconsin, and New York state. The McClung family continued to own the associated KHSL radio stations. KHSL-TV was purchased by Catamount Broadcasting in 1998.

=== Merger with KNVN ===
In 2000, Florida-based Bill Evans Communications acquired KNVN (the former KCPM) from Grapevine Communications, which was seeking to sell its only television station holding west of the Rocky Mountains. Evans immediately began discussing a shared services agreement (SSA) with Catamount to utilize KHSL-TV resources to support KNVN in areas such as engineering, promotion, and production. As initially conceived, the SSA also contemplated a limited amount of sharing among the stations' news departments, primarily among reporters. Beginning in 2001, news output was gradually consolidated among the two stations, which had previously served separate demographics with KHSL appealing to an older audience. In late 2001, the stations combined their morning newscasts, and in January 2002, the two stations began airing common weekend newscasts, titled NCN (Northern California News). In 2006, KHSL became the market's broadcaster of the new CW network and debuted a 10 p.m. newscast for the CW subchannel. The local newscasts, known as Action News in the early 2010s, were rebranded as Action News Now by 2015.

KHSL and KNVN, as well as KCVU (channel 30), shut off their analog signals on December 22, 2008. The early digital switchover permitted the stations to save on electricity and retire aging analog transmitters early, as well as make way for other equipment in the transmitter sites. The stations were sold to GOCOM Media and K4 Media Holdings, respectively, in tandem acquisitions totaling $7 million in 2013. Under GOCOM, KHSL and KNVN converted to high-definition local news production, and the facilities received a remodel.

=== Heartland and Allen ownership ===
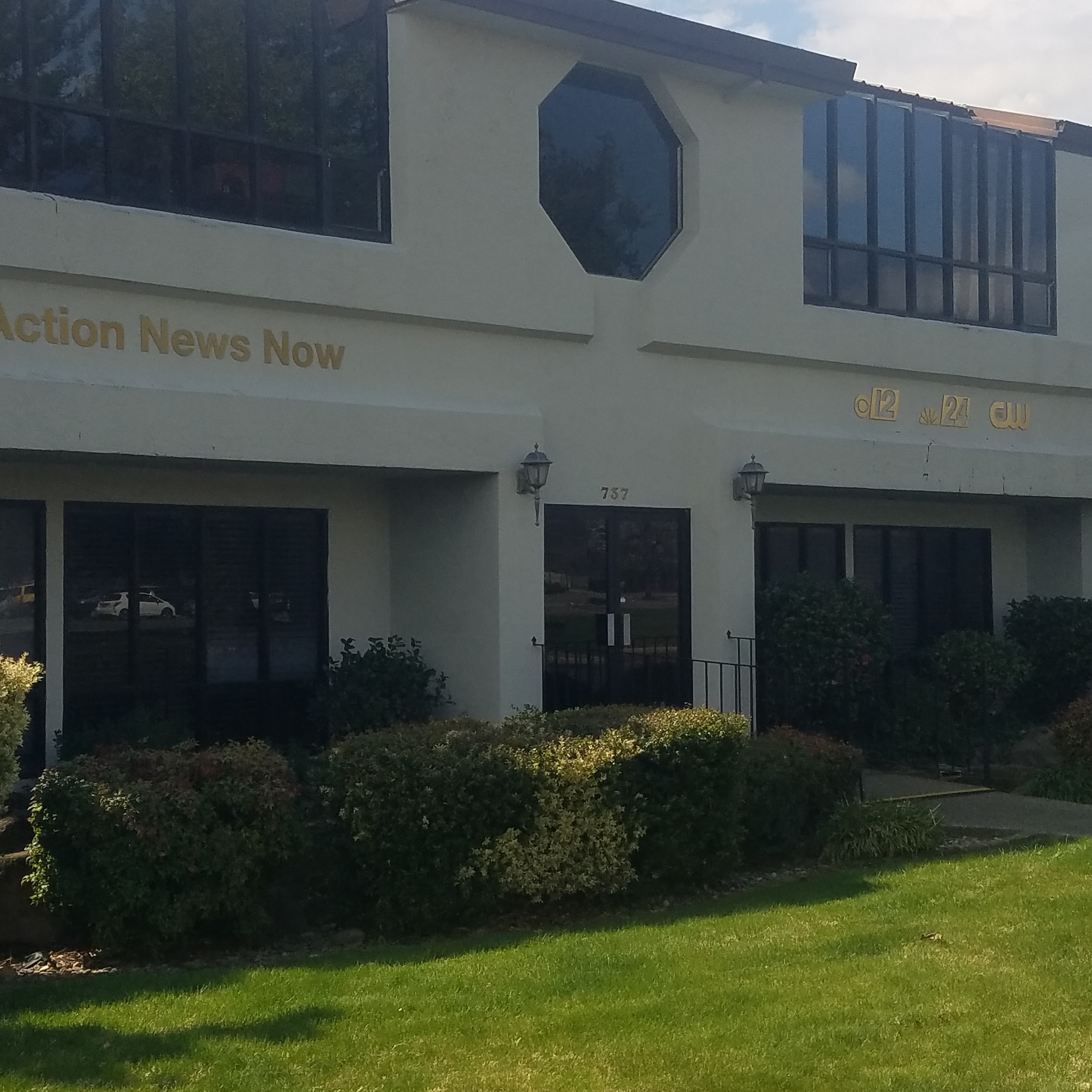
The Action News Now Redding bureau on Auditorium Drive

GOCOM sold KHSL-TV to USA Television Holdings, a joint venture of Heartland Media and MSouth Equity Partners, for $40 million in 2015. Concurrently, K4 Media Holdings sold KNVN to Maxair Media, with KHSL-TV continuing to provide services to KNVN and sell up to 15 percent of channel 24's advertising time. Byron Allen, through his Entertainment Studios division, purchased 11 of the Heartland stations, including KHSL-TV, in a deal announced in 2019 and completed in 2020.

On January 17, 2025, Allen Media Group announced plans to cut local meteorologist/weather forecaster positions from its stations, including KHSL/KNVN, and replacing them with a "weather hub" produced by The Weather Channel, which AMG also owns. The decision was reversed within a week by management in response to "viewer and advertiser reaction".

On June 1, 2025, amid financial woes and rising debt, Allen Media Group announced that it would explore strategic options for the company, such as a sale of its television stations (including KHSL and the LMA with KNVN).

== Notable former on-air staff ==
- Louisa Hodge – morning news anchor, until 2005
- Stan Statham – news anchor and public affairs director, c. 1967–1976
- Anthony Watts – meteorologist, 1987–2002, 2004–2005

== Technical information and subchannels ==
KHSL-TV is broadcast to the Chico area from Cohasset Ridge in Butte County and to Redding from South Fork Mountain northwest of Redding. The signals from both transmitters are multiplexed:

Subchannels of KHSL-TV
Subchannel	Res.	Short name	Programming
12.1	1080i	KHSL-HD	CBS
12.2	720p	CW-HD	CW+
12.5	480i	ION NET	Ion
12.7	480i	MeTV	MeTV
12.9	480i	MeToons	MeTV Toons

The gaps in minor channel numbers from KHSL and KNVN are filled by K31ND-D in Oroville, which broadcasts all subchannels of both stations in standard definition, with KHSL 12.1, .2, .5, .7, and .9 airing as 12.3, .4, .6, .8, and .10.

=== Translators ===
In addition to a digital replacement translator on South Fork Mountain in Redding and K31ND-D in Oroville, KHSL-TV is rebroadcast by translator K31PS-D in Lakeshore.

== See also ==
- KHSL-FM
