= The Moriss Taylor Show =

Local television program in Chico, California

The Moriss Taylor Show was one of the longest-running locally produced television shows in history. Hosted by longtime radio personality and producer Moriss Taylor, the show (based in Chico, California) was a weekly country music-variety staple featuring such musicians as Charlie Robinson, Ray Ecox, Yvonne Ambrose-Haygood, Bill Teague, Mark Alstad, Rosie Mello, Jolene Farrara, Mark Pacheco, and Mel Wilson. Announcer Ron Palmer and news reporter Rick Rigsby also made appearances on the show.

The show started in 1956, three years after the launch of its host television station KHSL-TV. It was produced at both KHSL-TV studio locations on 4th and Wall Streets from 1956–84 and on Silverbell Road from 1984-95. It was broadcast on Channel 12 from 1956–95 and was shown in reruns on KHSL-TV until 1997 when it was cancelled following the acquisition of the station by Catamount Broadcasting.

Repeats later aired on Chico TV station KRVU.

In 2015, KRVU cancelled The Moriss Taylor Show following an ownership change of the station when they were purchased by Bonten Media Group, then-owners of KRCR-TV in Redding, California, a chief rival of KHSL-TV since 1956. Episodes can now be seen on YouTube. On January 8, 2018, Moriss Taylor (retired since 2013) died at his home in Chico. He was 93.
