= Miami Marathon Oil Company Service Station =

- U.S. National Register of Historic Places
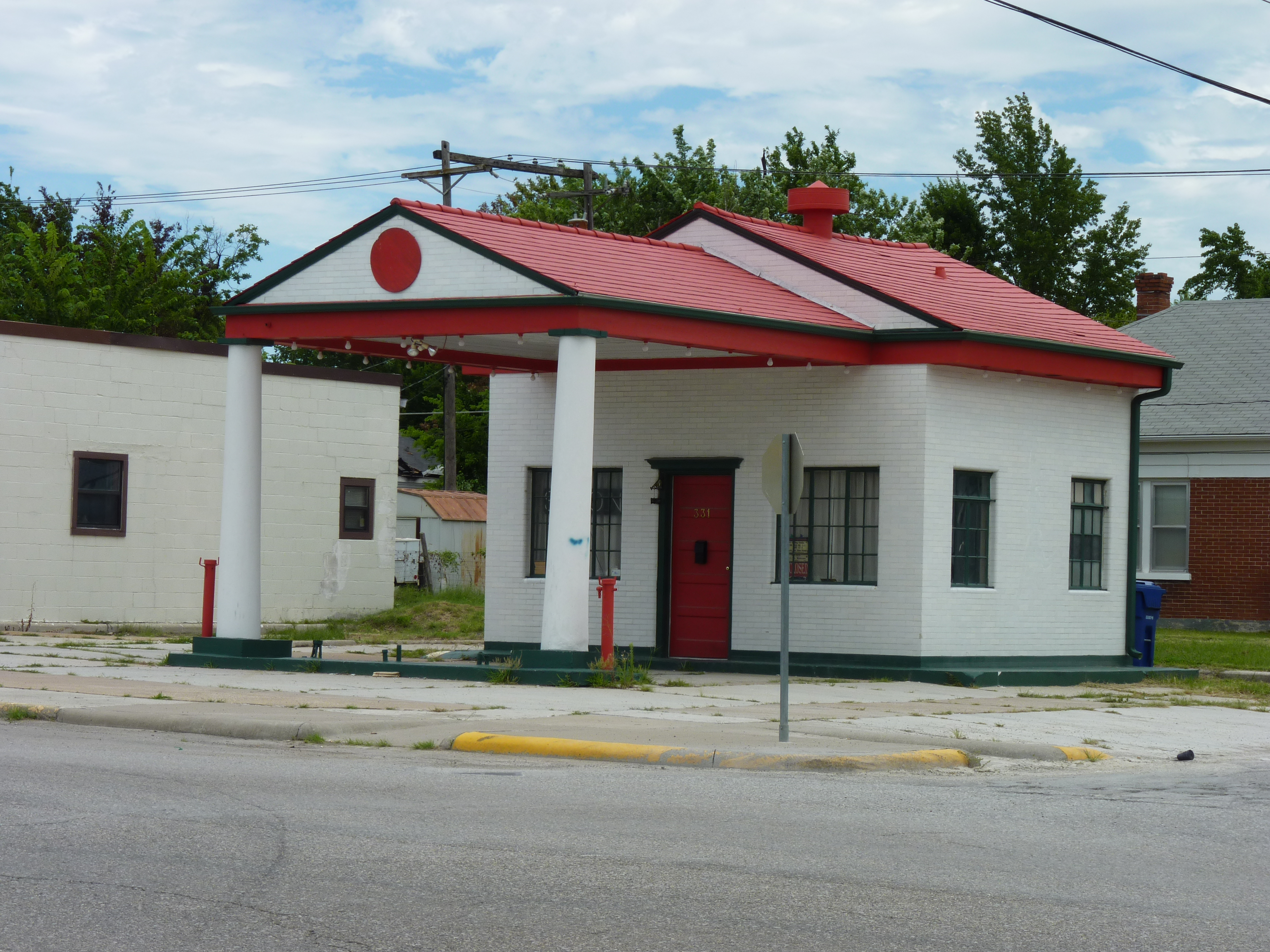
- The former Marathon gas station in July 2010.

- Location within Oklahoma
- Location: 331 S. Main St., Miami, Oklahoma
- Coordinates: 36°52′11″N 94°52′37″W
- Area: less than one acre
- Built: 1929
- Architectural style: Classical Revival
- MPS: Route 66 in Oklahoma MPS
- NRHP reference No.: 95000041
- Added to NRHP: February 23, 1995

The Miami Marathon Oil Company Service Station, at 331 S. Main St. in Miami, Oklahoma, was built in 1929. It was listed on the National Register of Historic Places in 1995.

It is a one-story Classical Revival-style building built on the south side of historic Route 66.
