= George L. Coleman Sr. House =

- George L. Coleman Sr.
- U.S. National Register of Historic Places
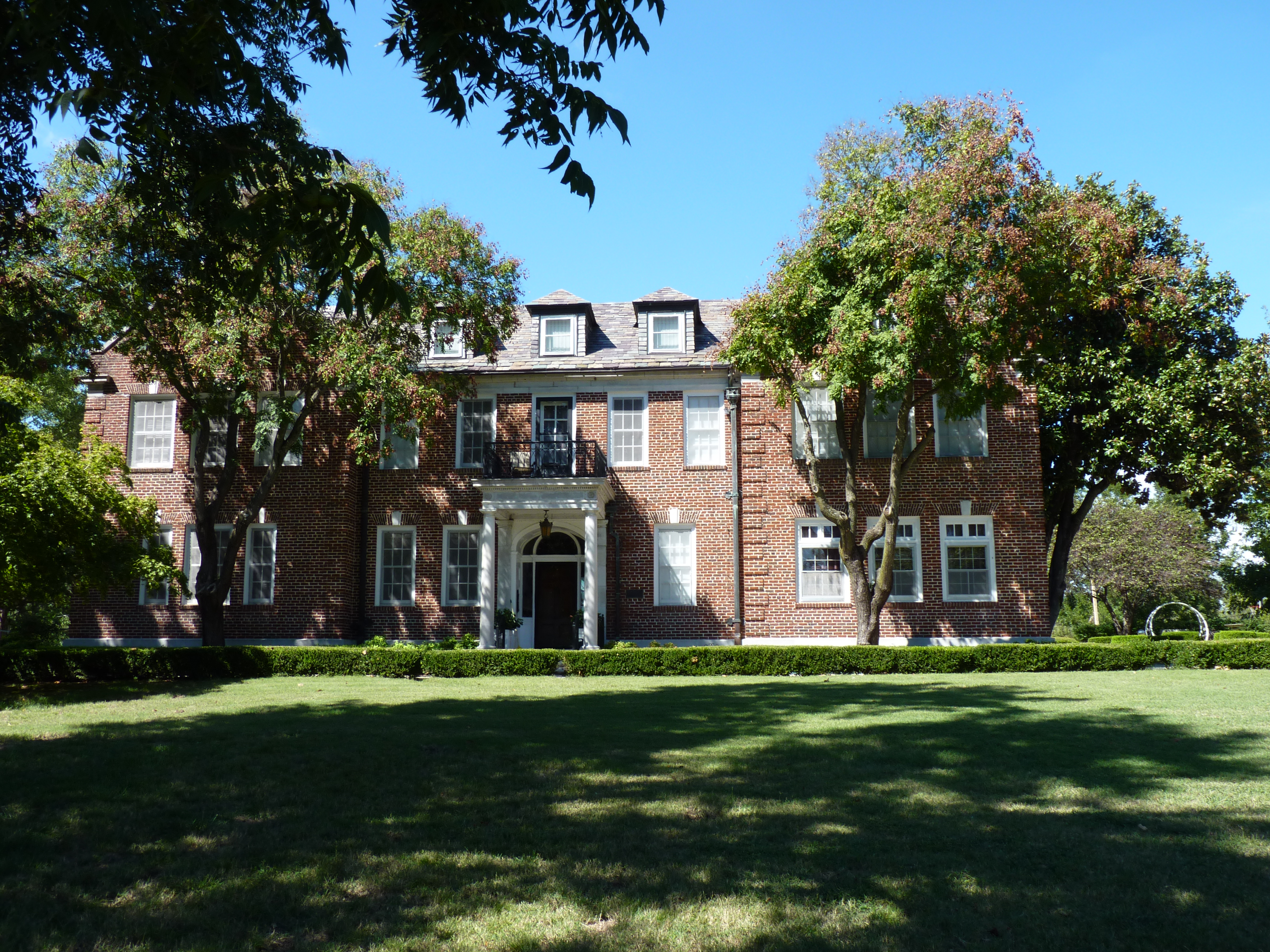

- Location within Oklahoma
- Location: 1001 Rockdale St., Miami, Oklahoma
- Coordinates: 36°53′00″N 94°51′40″W
- Area: less than one acre
- Built: 1918
- Built by: George L. Coleman Sr.
- Architectural style: Mid 19th Century Revival
- NRHP reference No.: 83002113
- Added to NRHP: May 9, 1983

The George L. Coleman Sr. House, at 1001 Rockdale St. in Miami, Oklahoma, was built in 1918. It was listed on the National Register of Historic Places in 1983. The listing included two contributing buildings and a contributing structure.

It is a two-and-a-half-story mansion complex including the house, a courtyard, and a garage, all attached to each other, with overall 80 by 180 feet (24 m × 55 m) plan. It has Georgian Revival features. Its red brick walls have brick laid in common bond.

== See also ==
- Coleman Theatre, also NRHP-listed in 1983 in Miami
