= KNVN =

Television station in Chico, California

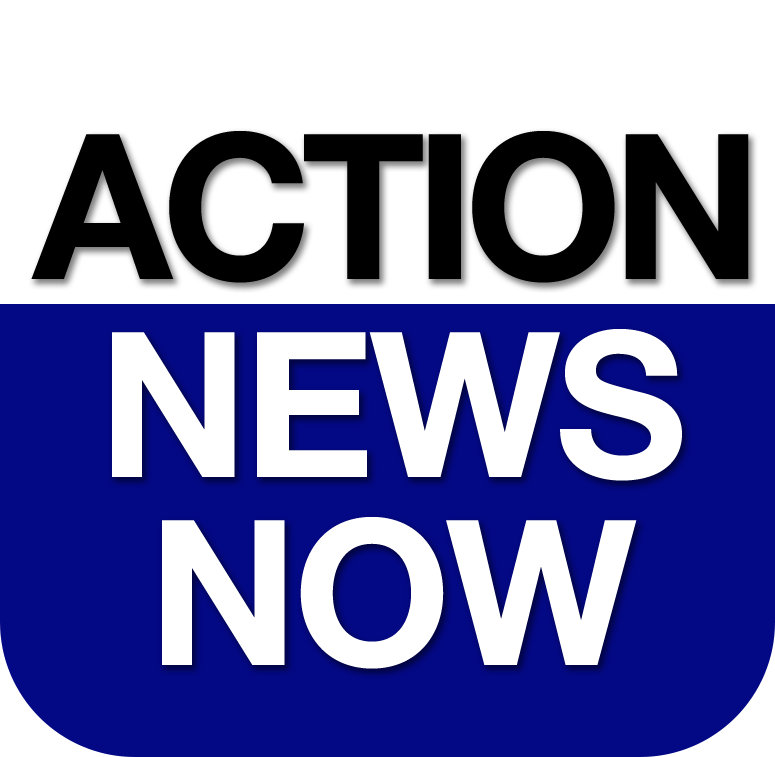
- Chico–Redding, California; United States
- City: Chico, California
- Channels: Digital: 20 (UHF); Virtual: 24
- Branding: NBC 24; Action News Now; Telemundo Chico Redding (24.2)

Programming
- Affiliations: 24.1: NBC; 24.2: Telemundo; for others, see § Subchannels

Ownership
- Owner: Maxair Media, LLC
- Operator: Allen Media Group
- Sister stations: KHSL-TV

History
- First air date: September 24, 1985
- Former call signs: KCPM (1985–1998)
- Former channel numbers: Analog: 24 (UHF, 1983–2008); Digital: 36 (UHF, 2004–2008), 24 (UHF, 2008–2020)
- Call sign meaning: North Valley News

Technical information
- Licensing authority: FCC
- Facility ID: 33745
- ERP: 300 kW
- HAAT: 566.7 m (1,859 ft)
- Transmitter coordinates: 40°15′30.6″N 122°5′24.4″W
- Translator(s): K31ND-D Oroville

Links
- Public license information: Public file; LMS
- Website: www.actionnewsnow.com

KNVN (channel 24) is a television station in Chico, California, United States, serving the Chico–Redding area as an affiliate of NBC and Telemundo. It is owned by Maxair Media and operated by Allen Media Group alongside CBS affiliate KHSL-TV (channel 12). The two stations share studios on the corner of Eaton Road and Silverbell Road on the northwest side of Chico; KNVN's transmitter is located northeast of Red Bluff.

Channel 24 in Chico began broadcasting on September 24, 1985, as KCPM. Owned by Superior Broadcasting of California, it brought a full-time NBC affiliate to the Chico–Redding media market. The next year, it debuted local newscasts, bringing a larger-market style of newscasting to Chico. Lorimar-Telepictures became a minority owner and eventually sold the station to the Davis-Goldfarb group in 1989. In 1998, after a year of technical issues and transmitter malfunctions, new owner GOCOM Communications relaunched the station as KNVN ("North Valley News").

After GOCOM merged with Grapevine Communications in 1999, the company sought to sell KNVN, the only station it owned west of the Rocky Mountains. The new owner, Bill Evans Communications, entered into the shared services agreement with KHSL-TV and moved its operations in with that station. Over the course of the early 2000s, separate newscasts were merged into a shared news product. KNVN's operations have been managed by KHSL-TV under several different owners.

== History ==
=== Early years ===
In December 1978, Superior Broadcasting of California, a Delano, California–based firm owned by Mel Querio and Jack Koonce, filed with the Federal Communications Commission (FCC) for authority to build a new television station on channel 24 in Chico. Two other groups applied. Far West Broadcasting Corporation was a subsidiary of Kelly Broadcasting, owner of KCRA-TV, the NBC affiliate in Sacramento. Southwest Television was owned by Gene Adelstein and Edward Berger, partners in KZAZ in Tucson, Arizona. At the start of 1981, the FCC designated these applications for comparative hearing, with only Superior and Far West in contention. FCC administrative law judge Joseph P. Gonzalez issued an initial decision in favor of Superior Broadcasting in January 1983. He found that Superior was substantially superior in the area of diversification of media ownership over Far West. The commission upheld Gonzalez's decision.

The new station, given the call sign KCPM, secured the NBC affiliation for the market. Prior to KCPM's arrival, NBC programs were occasionally carried by Redding–based KRCR (channel 7). The station set up in a studio building vacated by Chico's other commercial station, KHSL-TV (channel 12), outfitting it with almost all-new equipment. Construction began on the station's transmitter site at Tuscan Buttes, east of Red Bluff. Additionally, television production company Telepictures acquired a 19-percent ownership stake in KCPM.

After delays attributed to severe weather and incorrect equipment being shipped, KCPM began broadcasting on September 24, 1985, with the season premiere of the NBC show The A-Team. In some areas, cable companies—including in Redding—did not provide the new station, owing to the recent removal of must-carry rules that would have required them to do so. The signal was poor in the Paradise area, where the local cable system likewise refused to carry KCPM. In an attempt to remedy the shortfalls in coverage in ridge communities like Paradise and Oroville, KCPM purchased a translator to rebroadcast its signal. Shortly after the station signed on, minority owner Telepictures merged with Lorimar Television to create Lorimar-Telepictures. In the station's early months, local programming was limited to an overnight movie hosted by "Sleepy" Dan McGrath.

On May 12, 1986, KCPM began producing a local newscast, titled 24 Reports, with a staff of 16, including live news equipment in Chico and Redding and access to a helicopter. The overall goal was to bring tools common in larger markets to the smaller Chico–Redding market. A review of KCPM's newscast in the Paradise Post found that it succeeded at bringing "a big-city, big-budget news show" to the market and contained a good quantity of local news stories, as well as spurring the competitors to upgrade the look of their newscasts. By 1988, KCPM also produced an 11 p.m. newscast and cut-ins during The Today Show.

In 1987, Lorimar-Telepictures effectuated a corporate restructuring. It sold its 19-percent interest in KCPM and ownership in two other stations—KSPR in Springfield, Missouri, and KMID in Midland, Texas—to Goltrin Communications, headed by Joseph Goldfarb, the president of Lorimar's broadcasting division. In 1989, Marvin Davis, former owner of 20th Century Fox, acquired a stake in the company, which became known as Davis-Goldfarb.

The Davis-Goldfarb stations were sold for $32.5 million to Cottonwood Communications Corporation in 1995. Cottonwood was the first foray of longtime broadcast manager Al Seethaler into station ownership. By the time it merged with GOCOM Communications, headed by Ric Gorman, in 1997, the station's technical plant was facing a series of outages. In one instance, the antenna failed, forcing the local cable system to substitute KUSA from Denver during the 1997 Major League Baseball postseason, part of which aired on NBC. In that instance, KCPM was out of service for nearly a week, but that was one of 14 outages over an 11-month period. In July 1998, a new antenna and transmission line were installed at the site. On August 10, the station relaunched its newscasts and changed its call sign to KNVN, for "North Valley News". GOCOM merged with Grapevine Communications in 1999, with the combined company retaining the name GOCOM.

=== Merger with KHSL-TV ===
In 2000, Florida-based Bill Evans Communications acquired KNVN from Grapevine Communications, which was seeking to sell its only television station holding west of the Rocky Mountains. Evans immediately began discussing a shared services agreement (SSA) with KHSL-TV owner Catamount Broadcasting to utilize KHSL-TV resources to support KNVN in areas such as engineering, promotion, and production. As initially conceived, the SSA also contemplated a limited amount of sharing among the stations' news departments, primarily among reporters. Beginning in 2001, news output was gradually consolidated among the two stations, which had previously served separate demographics with KHSL appealing to an older audience. In late 2001, the stations combined their morning newscasts, and in January 2002, the two stations began airing common weekend newscasts, titled NCN (Northern California News). In 2006, KHSL became the market's broadcaster of the new CW network and debuted a 10 p.m. newscast for the CW subchannel. The local newscasts, known as Action News in the early 2010s, were rebranded as Action News Now by 2015.

KHSL and KNVN, as well as KCVU (channel 30), shut off their analog signals on December 22, 2008. The early digital switchover permitted the stations to save on electricity and retire aging analog transmitters early, as well as make way for other equipment in the transmitter sites. The stations were sold to GOCOM Media and K4 Media Holdings, respectively, in tandem acquisitions totaling $7 million in 2013. This marked Gorman's return to the market after owning channel 24 in the 1990s. Under GOCOM, KHSL and KNVN converted to high-definition local news production, and the facilities received a remodel.

=== Heartland and Allen ownership ===
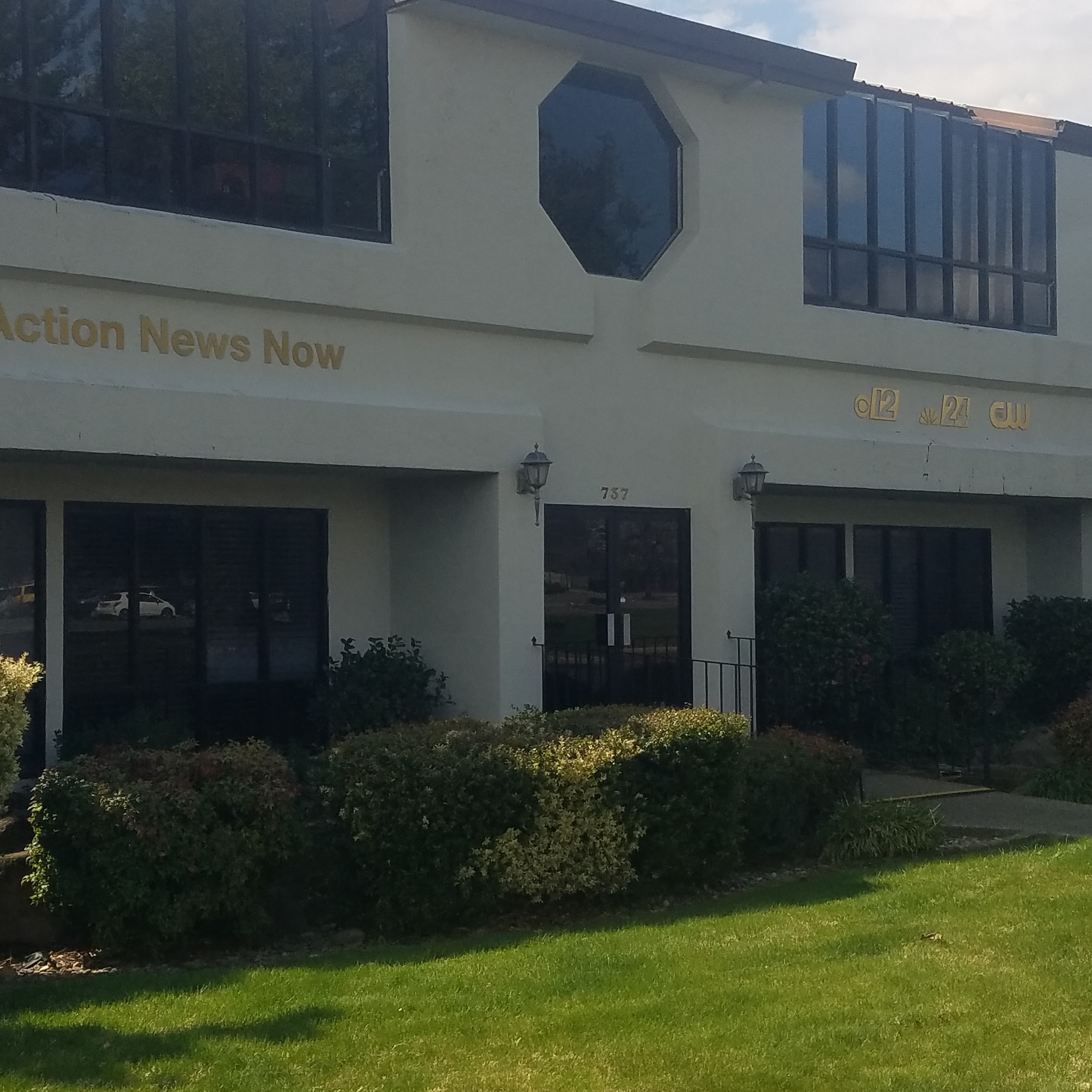
The Action News Now Redding bureau on Auditorium Drive

GOCOM sold KHSL-TV to USA Television Holdings, a joint venture of Heartland Media and MSouth Equity Partners, for $40 million in 2015. Concurrently, K4 Media Holdings sold KNVN to Maxair Media, with KHSL-TV continuing to provide services to KNVN and sell up to 15 percent of channel 24's advertising time. Byron Allen, through his Entertainment Studios division, purchased 11 of the Heartland stations, including KHSL-TV, in a deal announced in 2019 and completed in 2020.

On January 17, 2025, Allen Media Group announced plans to cut local meteorologist/weather forecaster positions from its stations, including KHSL/KNVN, and replacing them with a "weather hub" produced by The Weather Channel, which AMG also owns. The decision was reversed within a week by management in response to "viewer and advertiser reaction".

On June 1, 2025, amid financial woes and rising debt, Allen Media Group announced that it would explore strategic options for the company, such as a sale of its television stations (including KHSL and the LMA with KNVN).

== Telemundo Chico-Redding ==
Logo for Telemundo Chico-Redding

By 2015, KNVN's second subchannel was the region's affiliate of Telemundo. It offered a locally produced Spanish-language newscast called Acción Noticiero Telemundo. Spanish-language local news was discontinued on October 25, 2024.

== Technical information and subchannels ==
KNVN broadcasts from Tuscan Buttes, northeast of Red Bluff. The station's signal is multiplexed:

Subchannels of KNVN
Subchannel	Res.	Short name	Programming
24.1	1080i	KNVN-HD	NBC
24.2	720p	Telemun	Telemundo
24.5	480i	StartTV	Start TV
24.6	480i	HITV	Heroes & Icons

K31ND-D in Oroville, on Mount Bloomer, provides standard-definition broadcasts of all subchannels of KHSL and KNVN, using different minor channel numbers.

Subchannels of K31ND-D
Subchannel	Res.	Short name	Programming
12.3	480i	CBSSD	CBS
12.4	480i	CWSD	CW+
12.6	480i	IONSD	Ion
12.8	480i	MeTVSD	MeTV
12.10	480i	MeToons	MeTV Toons
24.3	480i	NBCSD	NBC
24.4	480i	TELEMSD	Telemundo
24.7	480i	StartSD	Start TV
24.8	480i	HITVSD	Heroes & Icons

After the digital television transition, KNVN switched its signal from channel 36 to channel 24. It relocated its signal again from channel 24 to channel 20 on April 1, 2020, as a result of the 2016 United States wireless spectrum auction.
