= Tornado outbreak of January 17–18, 1999 =

Weather event in the United States

Meteorological history
- Formed: January 17, 1999
- Dissipated: January 18, 1999

Tornado outbreak
- Tornadoes: 24 confirmed
- Max. rating: F4 tornado

Overall effects
- Fatalities: 8
- Injuries: 149
- Damage: $40.2 million
- Part of the Tornadoes of 1999

From January 17–18, 1999, a major tornado outbreak occurred in the Southern through the Eastern United States, killing 8 people and injuring 149 others. This tornado outbreak was the second of three major tornado outbreaks in January 1999. It was followed several days later by the largest January outbreak on record.

== Confirmed tornadoes ==
Confirmed tornadoes by Fujita rating
FU	F0	F1	F2	F3	F4	F5	Total
0	9	9	3	2	1	0	24

=== January 17 event ===
F#	Location	County	Time (UTC)	Path length	Damage
Arkansas
F2	SE of Oil Trough	Independence, Jackson	2051	7 miles (11 km)	First tornado of the outbreak. Heavy damage to at least one house, plus extensive tree and power line damage.
F1	Diaz (1st tornado)	Jackson	2106	2 miles (3.2 km)	Damage mostly to trees.
F0	Diaz (2nd tornado)	Jackson	2108	unknown	Weak, short-lived tornado with no damage.
F1	Tuckerman area	Jackson	2123	9 miles (15 km)	Significant damage reported in a residential subdivision and at a sewer plant. One person was injured.
F0	NE of Tuckerman	Jackson	2128	1 mile (1.6 km)	Weak tornado with damage limited to trees.
F1	Grubbs area	Jackson	2128	6 miles (9.6 km)	Damage reported to about 12 houses, with a mobile home destroyed. Several barns were also damaged.
F0	N of Grubbs	Jackson	2138	unknown	Brief tornado with only minor tree damage.
F0	Risher area	Craighead	2145	16 miles (26 km)	Weak, long-tracked tornado. Damage limited to trees and power lines along its path.
F0	E of Lafe	Greene	2230	8 miles (13 km)	Minor tree damage along the path.
F1	Schug area	Greene	2235	6 miles (9.6 km)	Several mobile homes damaged. A substance abuse center lost its roof.
F0	NW of Weiner	Poinsett	2245	8 miles (13 km)	Tornado remained north of town. Minor damage reported.
F2	Lake City area	Craighead	2145	11 miles (17 km)	Two houses were destroyed and five others damage. Severe damage to an electrical substation.
Tennessee
F2	Halls area	Lauderdale	2355	4 miles (6.4 km)	Severe damage reported in Halls. Two businesses were flattened along with several mobile homes. Major damage to a church as well. In total, 49 structures were damaged or destroyed and 11 people were injured.
F3	Alamo area	Crockett	0009	10 miles (16 km)	Heavy damage in the south side of Alamo. 16 houses (including several mobile homes) and one business were destroyed and 73 others were damaged. Four people were injured.
F3	Jackson area (1st tornado)	Haywood, Madison	0015	22 miles (35 km)	The first tornado began south of Eurekaton in Haywood County at about 6:15 pm CST (0015 UTC) and tracked across rural areas towards the Madison County line. In Haywood County, there were 12 houses destroyed along with several farm buildings. The damage picked up more as it passed through Mercer and Denmark, where several more houses were destroyed. Severe damage was also reported at the McKellar-Sipes Regional Airport where several buildings were flattened and equipment was destroyed. The tornado heavily damaged numerous brick buildings in downtown Jackson before moving into residential areas of the city, where severe damage was reported to 38 houses and apartments; most of which were destroyed. The first tornado dissipated at about 6:25 pm CST (0025 UTC). Two people were injured by the first tornado, which was rated as an F3 on the Fujita scale.
F4	Jackson area (2nd tornado)	Madison	0025	16 miles (26 km)	6 deaths – The second tornado developed east of Bemis at 6:25 pm as the first tornado dissipated, moving directly through Bemis and causing F4 damage. The tornado crossed into the southeastern part of Jackson, causing additional F4 damage in residential areas. Over 200 homes and numerous businesses were destroyed or flattened and hundreds of others were damaged. Some of the demolished buildings include portions of a shopping center, the athletic fields of a high school, a school bus garage, half of an apartment building and a funeral home. Six people were killed and 106 were injured by this tornado.
F1	Saulsbury area	Fayette, Hardeman	0035	12 miles (20 km)	1 death – 1/4 mile (400 m) wide tornado destroyed 14 houses (most of them mobile homes) and damaged 27 others. Extensive tree and power line damage also reported. Four others were injured.
F1	Atwood area	Carroll	0105	10 miles (16 km)	1 death – Four mobile homes were destroyed and eight others were damaged. Numerous trees and power lines were damaged. One other person was injured.
F1	W of Dover	Stewart	0106	unknown	Short-lived tornado damaged the roof of a grocery store.
F1	E of Woodlawn	Montgomery	0128	1 mile (1.6 km)	Damage was reported on several farms, with several barns destroyed.
F1	SE of Adams	Robertson	0200	1 mile (1.6 km)	One farm was damaged, with moderate damage to the house and the barn and greenhouse destroyed.
Mississippi
F0	Slayden	Marshall	0045	1 mile (1.6 km)	Two mobile homes were destroyed and a house under construction was flattened. Two people were injured.
Sources: National Climatic Data Center

=== January 18 event ===
List of confirmed tornadoes - Monday, January 18, 1999: FU / F0 / F1 / F2 / F3 / F4 / F5 / Total; 0 / 2 / 0 / 0 / 0 / 0 / 0 / 2; Deaths: 0 / / / / Injuries: 18
F#	Location	County / Parish	Coord.	Time (UTC)	Path length	Max width	Summary
Pennsylvania
F0	Bedford area	Bedford	40.02°N 78.50°W	1820–1825	2 miles (3.2 km)	20 yd (18 m)	Short-lived tornado downed many trees and damaged a few buildings.
F0	Philadelphia area	Philadelphia	40.02°N 78.50°W	2136–2136	0.2 miles (320 m)	20 yd (18 m)	Brief gustnado touched down in South Philadelphia, injuring 18 people. Several buildings sustained minor damage, with windows blown out, and trees were downed.

== See also ==
- List of North American tornadoes and tornado outbreaks
- January 21–23, 1999 tornado outbreak
