= 1999 Haysville–Wichita tornado =

Tornado in Kansas, United States

- The tornado captured as it was impacting Haysville, Kansas

Meteorological history
- Formed: May 3, 1999, 8:13 p.m. CDT (UTC−05:00)
- Dissipated: May 3, 1999, 8:55 pm. CDT (UTC−05:00)
- Duration: 42 minutes

F4 tornado
- on the Fujita scale
- Max width: 880 yards (0.50 mi; 0.80 km)
- Path length: 24 miles (39 km)
- Highest winds: 207–260 mph (333–418 km/h)

Overall effects
- Fatalities: 6
- Injuries: 150
- Damage: $145 million (1999 USD)
- Areas affected: Sumner and Sedgwick Counties, especially the towns of Haysville and Wichita
- Part of the 1999 Great Plains tornado outbreak and Tornadoes of 1999

During the nighttime hours of May 3, 1999, a deadly, long-tracked and violent F4 tornado struck the town of Haysville, Kansas and the southern portions of the city of Wichita, Kansas. Occurring amidst a major tornado outbreak that took place across the region from May 2 to 5, this tornado, referred to as either the Haysville–Wichita tornado or more simply the Haysville tornado, killed six people in total and injured more than 145 others along its 24 mi (39 km)-long path. Approximately $145 million in damages were caused by the tornado, most of which came from Haysville. It was the second of two deadly twisters Haysville was severely impacted by in the 1990s, with the previous being the 1991 Andover tornado.

The tornado first touched down north of Wellington, Kansas around 8:13 p.m. CDT, downing several power poles in the area, and tracked north-northeast. Along its path, two mobile homes, three sheds, and a pole barn were destroyed while nine other buildings sustained damage. Four people were injured in Sumner County, Kansas, three of which occurred when a mobile home was destroyed. About 20 minutes after touching down, the tornado crossed into Sedgwick County about 1 mi (1.6 km) west of Peck. At 8:35 p.m. CDT, the now violent tornado struck a mobile home park in Haysville, destroying much of the subdivision and killing three people. Continuing into the city's central business district, the tornado caused further damage and killed a fourth person. Throughout Haysville, 186 buildings were damaged or destroyed. Continuing into South Wichita, the tornado leveled the Lakeshore and Pacesetter mobile home parks, killing two residents. The tornado maintained a general northeast track before dissipating in the College Hill District of Northeast Wichita.

== Meteorological synopsis ==
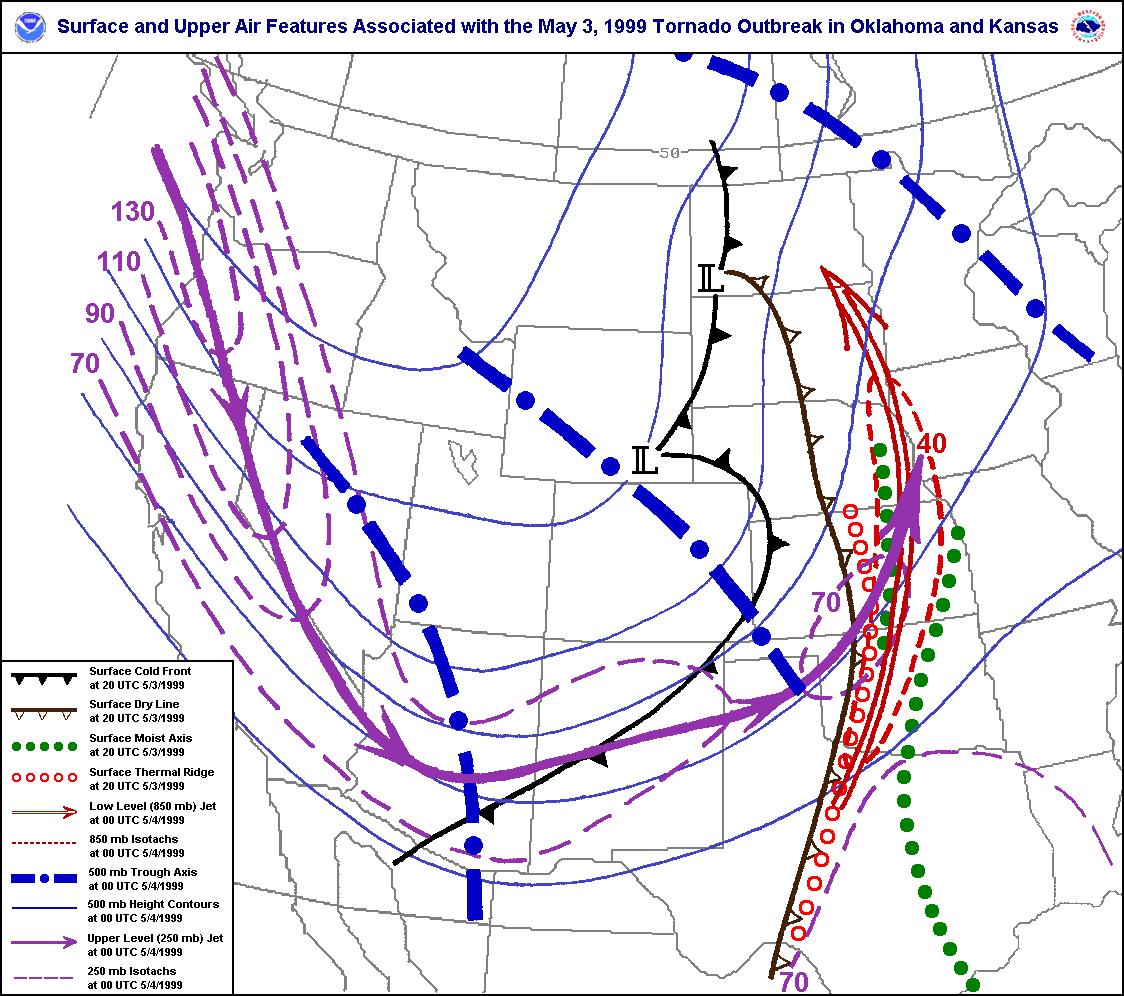
A map of the meteorological setup of the outbreak. The map displays surface and upper level atmospheric features associated with the outbreak.

The Haysville–Wichita tornado was part of a much larger outbreak which produced 71 tornadoes across five states throughout the Central Plains on May 3 alone, along with an additional 25 that touched down a day later in some of the areas affected by the previous day's activity (some of which were spawned by supercells that developed on the evening of May 3), stretching eastward to the Mississippi River Valley. The most prolific tornadic activity associated with the May 3 outbreak – and the multi-day outbreak as a whole – occurred in Oklahoma; 14 of the 66 tornadoes that occurred within the state that afternoon and evening produced damage consistent with the Fujita scale's "strong" (F2–F3) and "violent" (F4–F5) categories, which, in addition to the areas struck by the Bridge Creek–Moore tornado family, affected towns such as Mulhall, Cimarron City, Dover, Choctaw and Stroud.

=== Setup ===
The outbreak was caused by a vigorous upper-level trough that moved into the Central and Southern Plains states on the morning of May 3. That morning, low stratus clouds overspread much of Oklahoma, with clear skies along and west of a dry line located from Gage to Childress, Texas. Air temperatures at 7:00 a.m. Central Daylight Time ranged in the mid to upper 60s °F (upper 10s to near 20 °C) across the region, while dew point values ranged in the low to mid 60s °F (mid to upper 10s °C). The Storm Prediction Center (SPC) in Norman, Oklahoma, a division of the National Weather Service, initially issued a slight risk of severe thunderstorms early that morning stretching from the Kansas-Nebraska border to parts of southern Texas, with an intended threat of large hail, damaging winds and tornadoes. By late morning, the low cloud cover began to dissipate in advance of the dry line, but during the afternoon high cirrus clouds overspread the region, resulting in filtered sunshine in some areas that caused atmospheric destabilization. The sunshine and heating, combined with abundant low-level moisture, combined to produce a very unstable air mass. Upper air balloon soundings observed strong directional wind shear, cooling temperatures at high atmospheric levels, and the increased potential of CAPE values potentially exceeding 4000 J/kg, levels that are considered favorable for supercells and tornadoes.

=== Forecast and initiation ===
The SPC's Day 1 Convective Outlook for May 3, showing the Categorical Graphic

As observations and forecasts began to indicate an increasing likelihood of widespread severe weather conditions even more favorable for strong tornadoes, the SPC issued a moderate risk of severe weather at 11:15 a.m. CDT for portions of Kansas, Oklahoma and Texas along and near the Interstate 40 corridor.

... N CENTRAL TX/OK/SRN KS ...

LOW LEVEL JET WILL MAINTAIN SIGNIFICANT INFLOW OF LOW LEVEL MOISTURE WITH SURFACE DEWPOINTS AROUND 65F. CLEARING SKIES EVIDENT ON VISIBLE IMAGES WILL FURTHER CONTRIBUTE TO STRONG DESTABILIZATION OVER REGION WITH LATE AFTERNOON MUCAPES FORECASTED FROM 3500 TO 4500 J/KG OVER MDT RISK AREA. AS SHORT WAVE APPROACHES WRN OK/TX BORDER…LIFTING WILL DEEPEN NEAR/ALONG DRYLINE WITH THUNDERSTORMS INCREASING AS THEY MOVE EWD INTO INSTABILITY AXIS. 50 KT MID LEVEL SWLY FLOW SPREADING OVER LOW LEVEL JET AXIS WILL PROVIDE SUFFICIENT SHEAR FOR A FEW STRONG OR VIOLENT TORNADIC SUPERCELLS GIVEN THE ABUNDANT LOW LEVEL MOISTURE AND THE HIGH INSTABILITY.

— NWS Storm Prediction Center (SPC), May 3, 1999 1630 UTC Day 1 Convective Outlook

At 3:49 p.m. CDT, the SPC − having gathered enough data to surmise that there was a credible threat of a significant severe weather outbreak occurring within the next few hours − amended its Day 1 Convective Outlook to place the western nine-tenths of the main body of Oklahoma, central and south-central Kansas and the northern two-thirds of Texas under a high severe weather risk, denoting a higher than normal probability of strong (F2+) tornadoes within the risk area. At 7:30 p.m. CDT, the SPC issued a tornado watch for central Kansas, effective from 7:30 p.m. until 12:00 a.m. CDT that evening, for the threat of tornadoes, hail up to three inches (7.6 cm) in diameter, wind gusts to 80 mph (130 km/h) and intense lightning.

== Tornado summary ==
=== Formation and Sumner County ===
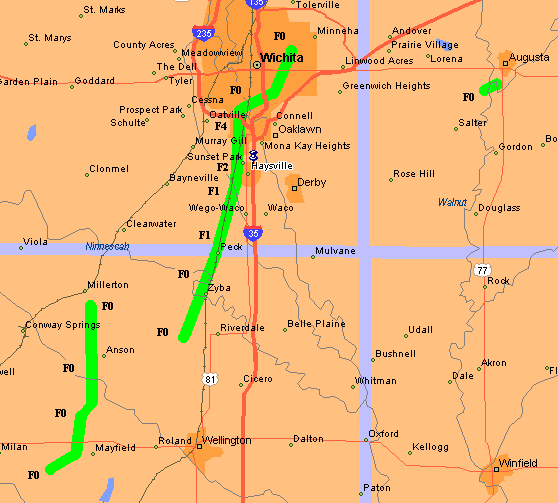
A track and intensity map of the tornadoes in the Wichita area including the Haysville-Wichita tornado.

The supercell responsible for the tornado first showed signs of rotation by 7:30 p.m. CDT, with a tornado warning issued 8 minutes later for Sumner County. The nearby NEXRAD doppler weather radar in Wichita failed shortly after, necessitating the NWS to utilize radar and equipment to track the storm from the Vance Air Force Base in Oklahoma. After producing a funnel cloud that did not touch down, the tornado first formed from the parent supercell thunderstorm at 8:13 p.m. CDT, touching down 4 miles north of Wellington within Sumner County. Here, it knocked down several power poles at F0 intensity. Moving northeast, the tornado began to gradually expand in width, approaching a mobile home division and completely destroying two of them at F1 intensity, while several others lost their roofs. Four injuries occurred here, including one that was critical, all of which occurred within the destroyed mobile homes. For the first 10 miles (16 km) of its path, most damage remained at F0 to F1 intensity, including destruction of a pole barn, two wood sheds and one metal shed, before the tornado crossed into Sedgwick County shortly afterwards.

=== Haysville, southern Wichita and dissipation ===
The tornado near the town of Peck about to enter Sedgwick County

As the tornado crossed into Sedgwick County, it continued north at F1 to F2 intensity, before it reached the town of Haysville, where it quickly became violent. A subdivision was completely destroyed at F4 intensity at the intersection of South Seneca and South 87th Streets in South Seneca Gardens, where two people were killed after a woman and her grandson were picked up by the tornado while running for shelter – a third person was fatally injured and died from his injuries two weeks later on May 22. Additionally, a home weather station located on 44th Street recorded a wind gust of 134 mph (216 km/h) before the house was destroyed. Entering the Central Business District, the tornado continued producing F3 to F4 damage, killing an elderly man in a mobile home on South 75th Street. Multiple more businesses within the district were destroyed or heavily damaged, totaling nearly 150 homes and 27 businesses within Haysville.

Now entering the southern outskirts of Wichita moving more to the north, continued damage and destruction reached as far north as South 47th Street, where it resumed a more northeastwards track. Two mobile home parks, the Lakeshore and Pancetter parks, were leveled at F4 intensity, killing two. After crossing Interstate 235, it turned more to the east, where it shrunk and weakened considerably, snapping trees and causing minor structural damage at F0 intensity as it crossed Interstate 135 near the East Harry Interchange. Continued tree damage occurred as it reached the College Hill District in northeastern Wichita, where it eventually dissipated and lifted at 8:55 p.m. CDT.

== Aftermath ==
All of Haysville's historic district was destroyed. The only thing left standing on the east side of Main Street was the original bank vault. The town's community library was also severely damaged, and did not resume operations until October of that year. Throughout Sedgwick County, 1,109 buildings were destroyed and 7,371 buildings were damaged, 2,456 severely. A total of 6 people were killed while 150 others were injured and losses amounted to $145 million. The tornado was described as being "overshadowed" by the much stronger F5 Bridge Creek–Moore tornado that had occurred further south in Oklahoma. Despite this, residents commemorated 25 years since the tornado in 2024 with a memorial, with scouts placing trees across the town's historic district.

== See also ==
- List of North American tornadoes and tornado outbreaks
- List of tornadoes in the 1999 Great Plains tornado outbreak − a chronological list of the tornadoes (as compiled in National Weather Service damage surveys and local storm reports) that occurred over the seven-day period of the outbreak from May 2 to 5, 1999
