= List of tornadoes in the 1999 Great Plains tornado outbreak =

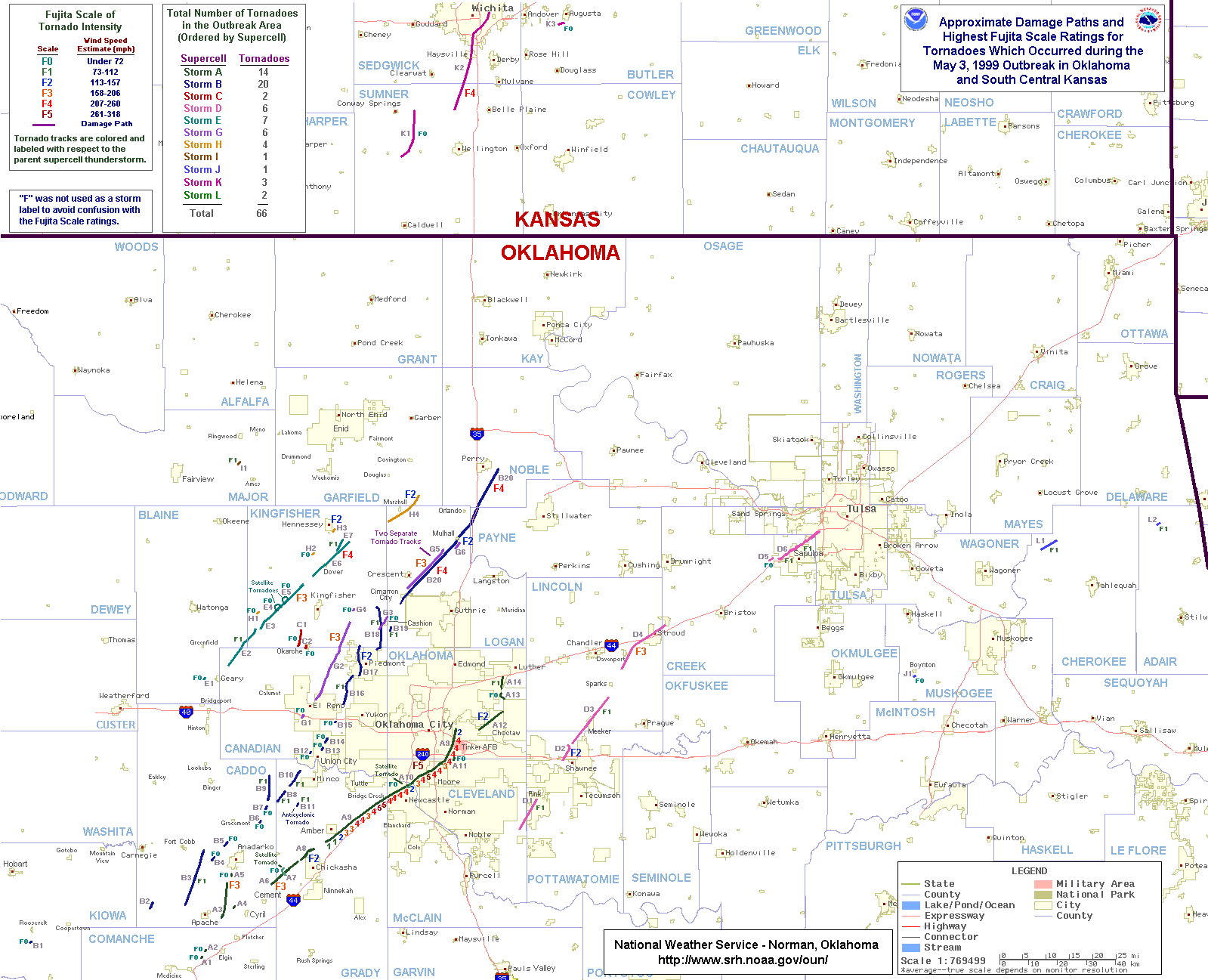
Map of confirmed tornadoes across Oklahoma and southern Kansas on May 3

From May 2 to 5, 1999, a large and devastating tornado outbreak took place across much of the Central and parts of the Eastern United States, as well as southern Canada. During this three-day event, 141 tornadoes touched down in these areas. The most horrific and widespread events unfolded during the afternoon of May 3 through the early morning hours of May 4 when more than half of these storms occurred; however, widespread tornado activity also occurred on May 5. Oklahoma experienced its largest tornado outbreak on record, with 70 confirmed. The most notable of these was the F5 Bridge Creek–Moore tornado which devastated Oklahoma City and suburban communities. The tornado killed 36 people and injured 583 others; losses amounted to $1 billion, making it the first billion-dollar tornado in history. (Note: All monetary values are in 1999 United States dollars unless otherwise noted.) Overall, 50 people lost their lives during the outbreak and damage amounted to $1.4 billion.

On May 2, a strong area of low pressure moved out of the Rocky Mountains and into the High Plains, producing scattered severe weather and ten tornadoes in Nebraska. The following day, atmospheric conditions across Oklahoma became significantly more favorable for an outbreak of severe weather. Wind profiles across the region strongly favored tornadic activity, with the Storm Prediction Center stating, "it became more obvious something major was looming" by the afternoon hours. Numerous supercell thunderstorms developed across Oklahoma as well as bordering areas in Kansas and Texas. Over the following 48 hours, May 3–4, 116 tornadoes touched down across the Central United States. Following the extensive outbreak, activity became increasingly scattered on May 5 before coming to an end.

== Confirmed tornadoes ==
Daily statistics
Date	Total	F0	F1	F2	F3	F4	F5	Deaths	Injuries
May 2	10	3	5	2	0	0	0	0	0
May 3	73	38	18	7	6	3	1	46	744
May 4	43	20	12	7	4	0	0	1	36
May 5	15	7	4	3	0	1	0	3	27
Total	141	68	39	17	10	4	1	50	807

Confirmed tornadoes during the 1999 Oklahoma tornado outbreak (Note: Coordinates derived from the Tornado History Project database.) (Note: All dates are based on the local time zone where the tornado touched down; however, all times are in Coordinated Universal Time for consistency.)
F#	Location	County / Parish	State	Coord.	Date	Time (UTC)	Path length	Max width	Summary
F0	NW of Arapahoe	Furnas	NE	40.32°N 99.92°W	May 2	2030–2031	0.5 miles (0.80 km)	15 yd (14 m)	Brief tornado damaged a farmstead near Holbrook.
F1	S of Elwood	Gosper	NE	40.37°N 99.85°W	May 2	2037–2047	4.5 miles (7.2 km)	60 yd (55 m)	At least three irrigation center pivots were destroyed.
F0	W of Ragan	Harlan	NE	40.32°N 99.30°W	May 2	2136–2137	1 mile (1.6 km)	15 yd (14 m)	Brief tornado with no damage.
F1	SE of Holdrege	Phelps	NE	40.37°N 99.27°W	May 2	2142–2148	4 miles (6.4 km)	50 yd (46 m)	Tornado remained over open country.
F1	NW of Macon	Franklin	NE	40.23°N 98.97°W	May 2	2200–2205	3 miles (4.8 km)	35 yd (32 m)	Tornado struck two farms near Macon, with outbuildings, center pivots, and grain bins sustaining heavy damage.
F1	E of Heartwell to SW of Wood River	Kearney, Adams, Hall	NE	40.57°N 98.75°W	May 2	2303–2330	12 miles (19 km)	100 yd (91 m)	First of two tornadoes near Kenesaw; damage is unknown.
F2	SW of Kenesaw	Adams	NE	40.58°N 98.72°W	May 2	2311–2341	10 miles (16 km)	250 yd (230 m)	Second tornado to strike near Kenesaw. One farm was damaged, with an irrigation pipe strewn across a field.
F0	W of Juniata	Adams	NE	40.58°N 98.55°W	May 2	2348–2351	1.5 miles (2.4 km)	15 yd (14 m)	Brief tornado with no damage.
F1	NW of Wood River	Hall	NE	40.83°N 98.62°W	May 2	0017–0020	1.5 miles (2.4 km)	35 yd (32 m)	Short-lived tornado destroyed grain bins, damaged a grain dryer, and pulled shingles off a nearby home.
F2	SW of Worms to NE of St. Libory	Merrick, Howard	NE	41.08°N 98.23°W	May 2	0106–0118	5.5 miles (8.9 km)	100 yd (91 m)	The final event of May 2 was a multiple-vortex tornado that destroyed numerous outbuildings and downed many trees along its path.
F0	ENE of Medicine Park	Comanche	OK	34.77°N 98.38°W	May 3	2151	0.5 miles (0.80 km)	25 yd (23 m)	Brief tornado touched down on U.S. Route 62; no damage occurred.
F0	W of Elgin	Comanche	OK	34.78°N 98.33°W	May 3	2155	0.1 miles (160 m)	25 yd (23 m)	Brief tornado with no damage.
F3	E of Apache to NE of Stecker	Caddo	OK	34.88°N 98.32°W	May 3	2220–2235	6 miles (9.7 km)	100 yd (91 m)	Tornado touched down to the east of Apache and moved north. As it neared Anadarko, it largely destroyed one home, with the roof removed and most walls collapsed. Three people were injured in the home.
F0	NW of Cyril	Caddo	OK	34.92°N 98.23°W	May 3	2226	0.1 miles (160 m)	25 yd (23 m)	Brief tornado with no damage.
F0	S of Roosevelt	Kiowa	OK	34.80°N 99.02°W	May 3	2236	0.1 miles (160 m)	25 yd (23 m)	Brief tornado with no damage.
F0	S of Anadarko	Caddo	OK	35.03°N 98.25°W	May 3	2238	0.1 miles (160 m)	25 yd (23 m)	Brief tornado with no damage.
F3	WSW of Laverty to WNW of Chickasha	Caddo, Grady	OK	34.97°N 98.12°W	May 3	2246–2310	9 miles (14 km)	880 yd (0.80 km)	Tornado touched down near the Caddo–Grady County border and quickly intensified. Two homes were largely destroyed, with a few interior walls standing, along U.S. Route 62 to the northwest of Chickasha. Several wooden high-tension power lines were downed. Nine people were injured to the south of Verden.
F0	NW of Chickasha	Grady	OK	35.05°N 98.03°W	May 3	2307–2308	1 mile (1.6 km)	75 yd (69 m)	Satellite tornado to the 2246 UTC F3 event; briefly rotated around the larger storm before dissipating.
F2	Chickasha area	Grady	OK	35.08°N 97.98°W	May 3	2312–2321	4 miles (6.4 km)	500 yd (460 m)	Tornado, a re-cycle of the previous F3, touched down to the northwest of downtown Chickasha and tracked into the Chickasha Municipal Airport. There, two hangar buildings and several aircraft were destroyed. A piece of an aircraft wing was found 45 mi (72 km) away in southwest Oklahoma City. Nearby, approximately 20 mobile homes were damaged or destroyed; four people were injured. A large building was also destroyed along U.S. Route 81 before the tornado dissipated. This tornado would re-cycle into the 1999 Bridge Creek–Moore tornado.
F0	WNW of Apache	Caddo	OK	34.95°N 98.57°W	May 3	2320–2324	2 miles (3.2 km)	25 yd (23 m)	Short-lived tornado with no damage.
F5	SSW of Amber to Moore to W of Midwest City	Grady, McClain, Cleveland, Oklahoma	OK	35.13°N 97.85°W	May 3	2323–0048	38 miles (61 km)	1,760 yd (1.61 km)	36 deaths – See article on this tornado – Long-lived and exceptionally violent tornado moved through suburban areas of Oklahoma City. A mobile Doppler weather Radar estimated wind speeds within the tornado between 281 and 321 mph (452 and 517 km/h), the highest ever observed. A total of 8,132 homes, 1,041 apartments, 260 businesses, 11 public buildings, and 7 churches were damaged or destroyed. Total losses from the tornado reached $1 billion, making it the costliest such storm on record at the time. In addition to the 36 fatalities directly related to the tornado, five people died of indirect causes, such as a heart attack, and 583 others were injured.
F1	S of Fort Cobb to W of Washita	Caddo	OK	34.98°N 98.43°W	May 3	2338–2359	7 miles (11 km)	150 yd (140 m)	Most significant damage occurred south of Fort Cobb where a barn and house garage were destroyed. A stock trailer was also thrown 100 yd (91 m). Sporadic tree damage took place elsewhere along the track.
F0	W of Anadarko	Caddo	OK	35.07°N 98.33°W	May 3	2356	0.1 miles (160 m)	25 yd (23 m)	Brief tornado with no damage.
F0	W of Okarche	Canadian, Kingfisher	OK	35.72°N 98.02°W	May 3	2358–0007	4 miles (6.4 km)	100 yd (91 m)	Tornado touched down near the Canadian–Kingfisher County border and moved north-northeast. One barn was destroyed while another was damaged.
F0	Okarche area	Canadian, Kingfisher	OK	35.72°N 97.98°W	May 3	0000	0.1 miles (160 m)	25 yd (23 m)	Brief tornado touched down along the Canadian–Kingfisher County border; no damage reported.
F0	N of Newcastle	McClain	OK	35.30°N 97.60°W	May 3	0010	0.2 miles (320 m)	20 yd (18 m)	Satellite tornado to the F5 Bridge Creek–Moore storm; remained over an open field north of Newcastle.
F0	NNW of Anadarko	Caddo	OK	35.12°N 98.28°W	May 3	0012–0013	1 mile (1.6 km)	25 yd (23 m)	Brief tornado with no damage.
F0	ESE of Gracemont	Caddo	OK	35.17°N 98.20°W	May 3	0020	0.1 miles (160 m)	25 yd (23 m)	Brief tornado with no damage.
F0	S of Midwest City	Oklahoma	OK	35.40°N 97.40°W	May 3	0031–0032	0.5 miles (0.80 km)	60 yd (55 m)	Satellite tornado to the F5 Bridge Creek–Moore storm touched down near I-240. A few homes sustained minor roof damage and fences were blown down.
F0	E of Gracemont	Caddo	OK	35.18°N 98.10°W	May 3	0034–0035	0.5 miles (0.80 km)	25 yd (23 m)	Brief tornado with no damage.
F1	Mayfield area	Sumner	KS	37.23°N 97.58°W	May 3	0035–0113	12 miles (19 km)	440 yd (400 m)	Tornado tracked into Mayfield, causing damage to a business. Just north of the town, a home sustained minor damage while an adjacent outbuilding had its roof blown off. A nearby farmstead sustained significant damage with two metal grain bins blown over, one of which was thrown into a barn. Near the end of the tornado's track, a mobile home was tossed 50 ft (15 m) and destroyed while another was damaged.
F1	WSW of Minco	Grady	OK	35.27°N 98.07°W	May 3	0037–0040	2 miles (3.2 km)	300 yd (270 m)	Formed simultaneously with the 0037 UTC Cogar storm. Tornado remained over a rural area and caused extensive tree damage.
F1	S of Cogar	Caddo	OK	35.27°N 98.13°W	May 3	0037–0048	5 miles (8.0 km)	50 yd (46 m)	Formed simultaneously with the 0037 UTC Minco storm. Tornado remained over a rural area and caused extensive tree damage.
F1	W of Minco	Grady	OK	35.32°N 98.02°W	May 3	0047–0100	4 miles (6.4 km)	60 yd (55 m)	Tornado touched down west of Minco and tracked northeast. One home had most of its roof blown off and was shifted slightly off its foundation. Near the end of the storm's path, tree and road sign damage occurred.
F2	Choctaw area	Oklahoma	OK	35.47°N 97.30°W	May 3	0053–0107	7 miles (11 km)	220 yd (200 m)	Tornado formed southwest of Choctaw and tracked directly into the downtown area. The most significant damage occurred in southwestern parts of town where two homes were mostly destroyed. In the center of Choctaw, several businesses were destroyed and a nursing home was damaged. Four people sustained injuries in Choctaw. After passing through the town, the storm moved over rural areas before dissipating. Overall, 22 homes and businesses were destroyed and 153 more were damaged; damage amounted to $3.2 million.
F1	SW of Minco	Grady	OK	35.27°N 98.00°W	May 3	0055	0.1 miles (160 m)	50 yd (46 m)	Brief tornado tore the roof off a home. Damage was indicative of F2 intensity, though sub-par construction of the home warranted a low classification.
F0	WNW of Union City	Canadian	OK	35.40°N 97.97°W	May 3	0103	0.1 miles (160 m)	25 yd (23 m)	Brief tornado with no damage.
F0	W of Maryneal	Nolan	TX	32.27°N 100.48°W	May 3	0108	0.1 miles (160 m)	10 yd (9.1 m)	Brief tornado with no damage.
F0	E of Jones	Oklahoma	OK	35.55°N 97.22°W	May 3	0109–0115	2 miles (3.2 km)	50 yd (46 m)	Short-lived tornado caused minor damage.
F4	N of Wellington to Wichita area	Sumner, Sedgwick	KS	37.32°N 97.40°W	May 3	0113–0155	24 miles (39 km)	880 yd (0.80 km)	6 deaths – See article on this tornado – A total of 6 people were killed while 150 others were injured and losses amounted to $145 million.
F0	NNE of Union City (1st tornado)	Canadian	OK	35.42°N 97.92°W	May 3	0113–0114	0.8 miles (1.3 km)	100 yd (91 m)	Brief tornado with no damage.
F0	NNE of Union City (2nd tornado)	Canadian	OK	35.43°N 97.90°W	May 3	0116–0119	1 mile (1.6 km)	75 yd (69 m)	Brief tornado with no damage.
F1	NE of Jones	Oklahoma	OK	35.58°N 97.23°W	May 3	0117–0125	4 miles (6.4 km)	50 yd (46 m)	Tornado caused damage to several homes.
F1	SSE of Ewing to ENE of Page	Holt	NE	42.23°N 98.33°W	May 3	0120–0145	15 miles (24 km)	100 yd (91 m)	Specifics on damage unknown.
F0	W of Geary	Blaine	OK	35.88°N 98.37°W	May 3	0121	0.1 miles (160 m)	25 yd (23 m)	Brief tornado with no damage.
F0	ESE of El Reno	Canadian	OK	35.52°N 97.92°W	May 3	0125	0.1 miles (0.16 km)	25 yd (23 m)	Brief tornado with no damage.
F0	W of Orchard	Antelope	NE	42.30°N 98.27°W	May 3	0127–0142	3 miles (4.8 km)	40 yd (37 m)	Tornado destroyed metal grain bins.
F1	WNW of Calumet to SSE of Omega	Canadian, Blaine, Kingfisher	OK	35.65°N 98.28°W	May 3	0129–0141	9 miles (14 km)	150 yd (140 m)	Tornado touched down in extreme northeastern Canadian County and briefly moved through Blaine County. Damage from the storm was confined to Kingfisher County where several mobile homes and outbuildings had their roof torn off. Extensive tree damage also occurred.
F1	WNW of Yukon	Canadian	OK	35.53°N 97.85°W	May 3	0134–0146	6 miles (9.7 km)	150 yd (140 m)	Damage was mainly limited to trees; however, a barn was destroyed and two mobile homes sustained significant damage. Additionally, a cow was killed.
F1	ESE of Norman to NE of Pink	Cleveland, Pottawatomie	OK	35.13°N 97.20°W	May 3	0134–0152	9 miles (14 km)	30 yd (27 m)	Tornado formed just north of Etowah and tracked north-northeast, causing some tree damage before moving into Pottawatomie County. After crossing the county line, the storm struck the community of Pink, causing significant damage to the local Baptist church and an adjoining metal gymnasium. The tornado then moved into southwestern Bethel Acres before dissipating.
F3	SSE of Omega to WNW of Kingfisher	Kingfisher	OK	35.77°N 98.15°W	May 3	0141–0206	12 miles (19 km)	450 yd (410 m)	Tornado formed well to the south-southeast of Omega and tracked northeast. Along the first 2.5 mi (4.0 km) of the track, a farmstead sustained significant damage and extensive tree damage occurred. As it passed 5 mi (8.0 km) west of Kingfisher, it reached F3 intensity, severely damaging a well-built brick home. Though anchored into the foundation, half of the walls collapsed or blew away and the roof was gone. Elsewhere along the path, seven mobile homes and numerous outbuildings were destroyed. Two people were injured in relation to this storm.
F2	W of Piedmont to SE of Kingfisher	Canadian, Kingfisher	OK	35.65°N 97.78°W	May 3	0148–0200	8 miles (13 km)	200 yd (180 m)	Tornado moved along a zig-zag path toward the north. About 4 mi (6.4 km) west of Piedmont, a barn, mobile home, and garage were destroyed. Debris from the mobile home was scattered up to 2 mi (3.2 km) away. Elsewhere along the track, many trees and power lines were downed.
F0	W of Creighton	Knox	NE	42.47°N 98.18°W	May 3	0151–0200	6 miles (9.7 km)	70 yd (64 m)	Power lines and power poles were downed.
F0	W of Kingfisher	Kingfisher	OK	35.85°N 98.03°W	May 3	0155–0156	0.5 miles (0.80 km)	50 yd (46 m)	Satellite tornado to the 0136 UTC F3 event. This storm briefly rotated around the parent circulation before dissipating.
F1	NNE of Piedmont to NW Cashion	Canadian, Kingfisher	OK	35.70°N 97.72°W	May 3	0158–0222	10 miles (16 km)	150 yd (140 m)	Tornado downed numerous trees and power poles along its path. Near Cashion, an oil storage tank was knocked off its mount.
F0	WNW of Kingfisher	Kingfisher	OK	35.88°N 98.03°W	May 3	0203	0.1 miles (160 m)	25 yd (23 m)	Second brief satellite tornado to the 0136 UTC F3 event; no damage occurred.
F2	WNW of Shawnee to E of McLoud	Pottawatomie	OK	35.37°N 97.00°W	May 3	0205–0220	7 miles (11 km)	250 yd (230 m)	1 death – Tornado touched down over rural areas of Pottawatomie County and tracked toward Shawnee. In the Clarks Heights addition, several buildings sustained minor damage. F2-type damage occurred in the West Gate neighborhood, where three homes had their roof completely removed. Further along the track several mobile homes were destroyed, resulting in one fatality and ten injuries. The storm later dissipated several miles east of McLoud.
F4	SSW of Dover to ESE of Hennessey	Kingfisher	OK	35.93°N 97.95°W	May 3	0210–0238	15 miles (24 km)	880 yd (0.80 km)	1 death - See article on this tornado - 1 person was killed while another 11 were injured. Monetary losses estimated at $2.5 million.
F1	SSW of Crescent	Logan	OK	35.78°N 97.68°W	May 3	0210–0212	1 mile (1.6 km)	100 yd (91 m)	Tornado confirmed by aerial survey revealing downed trees and power poles. Hay bales were strewn about a field as well.
F0	SW of Augusta	Butler	KS	37.65°N 97.02°W	May 3	0215	0.1 miles (160 m)	55 yd (50 m)	Brief tornado with no damage.
F1	NNW of Shawnee to NE of Meeker	Pottawatomie, Lincoln	OK	35.42°N 96.95°W	May 3	0220–0245	11 miles (18 km)	100 yd (91 m)	Tornado touched down near where the 0205 UTC F2 event dissipated. Shortly after forming, the tornado destroyed an outbuilding before moving into the Country Meadow housing addition in far north Shawnee. Several homes in the area were damaged, two of which lost their roof. Tracking northeast, the storm moved into Lincoln County. Roughly 2 mi (3.2 km)south-southwest of Meeker, a double-wide mobile home was destroyed, a fifth-wheel camper was tossed, and significant tree damage occurred. Minor damage continued elsewhere along the track as the tornado moved through southeastern Meeker.
F0	ESE of Omega	Kingfisher	OK	35.85°N 98.17°W	May 3	0222–0224	0.8 miles (1.3 km)	50 yd (46 m)	Brief tornado with no damage.
F0	NW of Verdigre	Knox	NE	42.63°N 98.08°W	May 3	0224	Brief	20 yd (18 m)	Brief tornado with no damage.
F0	SW of Belden	Cedar	NE	42.37°N 97.20°W	May 3	0225–0235	3.5 miles (5.6 km)	40 yd (37 m)	A barn and farm equipment were destroyed.
F4	SW of Cimarron City to Mulhall to ENE of Perry	Logan, Payne, Noble	OK	35.88°N 97.68°W	May 3	0225–0345	39 miles (63 km)	1,760 yd (1.61 km) (Note: The official maximum width of the F4 Mulhall tornado was 1 mi (1.6 km) according to the National Weather Service Office in Norman, Oklahoma; however, Doppler on Wheels measurements of the tornado indicated a windfield approximately 4.3 mi (6.9 km) in diameter, which would make it the largest tornado on record. This value remains unofficial, though.)	2 deaths – See article on this tornado – an additional 26 people were injured.
F1	E of Hartington	Cedar	NE	42.58°N 97.18°W	May 3	0226–0251	4 miles (6.4 km)	70 yd (64 m)	A house, an irrigation pivot, and farm buildings were damaged.
F1	NE of Dover	Kingfisher	OK	36.02°N 97.88°W	May 3	0230–0237	4 miles (6.4 km)	440 yd (400 m)	This storm existed simultaneously with the 0210 UTC F4 tornado. Forming northeast of Dover, this storm remained over mostly open terrain. Damage was limited to a few outbuildings, farm equipment, telephone poles, and trees.
F0	NW of Niobrara	Knox	NE	42.82°N 98.12°W	May 3	0232	Brief	20 yd (18 m)	Brief tornado with no damage.
F0	NW of Dover	Kingfisher	OK	36.02°N 97.95°W	May 3	0250	0.2 miles (320 m)	30 yd (27 m)	Brief tornado snapped or uprooted a few trees.
F0	SW of El Reno	Canadian	OK	35.50°N 98.00°W	May 3	0256–0258	1 mile (1.6 km)	50 yd (46 m)	Tornado touched down near Interstate 40 and struck the Redlands Community College. Minor damage to trees and roofs occurred here.
F2	ESE of Hennessey	Kingfisher	OK	36.10°N 97.88°W	May 3	0257–0302	1 mile (1.6 km)	150 yd (140 m)	Tornado touched down just outside Hennessey and tracked east-southeast. The storm quickly intensified, attaining high-end F2 strength shortly after forming, and struck a farm. A farmhouse and abandoned home sustained significant damage and a few outbuildings were destroyed. Heavy farm equipment was tossed several hundred yards and major tree damage occurred.
F0	NW of Springfield	Bon Homme	SD	42.87°N 97.92°W	May 3	0300	0.1 miles (160 m)	50 yd (46 m)	Brief tornado with no damage.
F0	SE of Greenwood	Charles Mix	SD	42.82°N 98.25°W	May 3	0303–0304	0.1 miles (160 m)	50 yd (46 m)	Brief tornado with no damage.
F3	NNE of El Reno to SE of Kingfisher	Canadian, Kingfisher	OK	35.55°N 97.97°W	May 3	0303–0337	22 miles (35 km)	750 yd (690 m)	Tornado touched down just outside El Reno and tracked generally northeast. Shortly after forming, two mobile homes were destroyed and three homes were damaged. Roughly 2.5 mi (4.0 km) into the track, the top of a 500 ft (150 m) tall transmission tower was blown off. The most intense damage occurred near the end of the storm's path where a 3,000 lb (1,400 kg) oil storage tank was moved 0.5 mi (0.80 km), with it being airborne for a substantial portion of this distance. Additionally, debarking of trees took place.
F3	NNE of Sparks to NW of Milfay	Lincoln. Creek	OK	35.65°N 96.80°W	May 3	0310–0350	15 miles (24 km)	750 yd (690 m)	See section on this tornado – seven people were injured.
F2	S of Marshall	Logan, Garfield	OK	36.12°N 97.65°W	May 3	0318–0328	8 miles (13 km)	440 yd (400 m)	Tornado remained over mostly rural areas; however, two residences experienced significant damage. An abandoned home near Marshall was completely destroyed. After entering Garfield County, the storm struck a farmstead and destroyed three grain bins, one of which was tossed 0.5 mi (0.80 km). A pole barn was also destroyed with debris strewn up to 150 yd (140 m) away. Extensive tree damage occurred as well, as large trees, "with trunk diameters the size of a small car," were uprooted and tossed 200 yd (180 m).
F1	S of Perry	Major	OK	36.30°N 98.25°W	May 3	0328–0330	1 mile (1.6 km)	200 yd (180 m)	Tornado un-roofed an office building and damaged an irrigation system.
F0	SW of Cashion	Kingfisher, Logan	OK	35.78°N 97.72°W	May 3	0338–0344	3 miles (4.8 km)	150 yd (140 m)	Short-lived tornado produced only minor damage.
F0	E of Kingfisher	Kingfisher	OK	35.85°N 97.78°W	May 3	0340–0341	0.5 miles (0.80 km)	50 yd (46 m)	Brief tornado damaged trees and outbuildings as it crossed Highway 33.
F3	S of Crescent to SW of Mulhall	Logan	OK	35.92°N 97.60°W	May 3	0350–0440	13 miles (21 km)	880 yd (0.80 km)	This tornado tracked along an almost identical path to the 0225 UTC F4 Muhall event. Survey teams were unable to differentiate damage between the two tornadoes for the most part; however, the destruction of 25 homes and damage of 30 others in Crescent can be at least partially attributed to this event.
F2	S of Mulhall	Logan	OK	36.03°N 97.42°W	May 3	0433–0436	2 miles (3.2 km)	440 yd (400 m)	Similar to the previous storm, this tornado formed close to the damage path left by the 0225 UTC F4 Muhall event. Significant damage of a brick home, with its roof torn off and collapse of an exterior wall, was attributed to this tornado. Extensive tree damage also occurred.
F0	Sapulpa area	Creek	OK	35.98°N 96.13°W	May 3	0458–0500	2 miles (3.2 km)	50 yd (46 m)	Weak tornado moved through the central business district of Sapulpa, breaking many storefront windows.
F1	NE of Sapulpa to Tulsa area	Creek, Tulsa	OK	36.02°N 96.07°W	May 3	0508–0521	7 miles (11 km)	150 yd (140 m)	In Creek County, 20 mobile homes were damaged or destroyed, while over 150 homes sustained minor to major damage as well as 25 businesses. In Tulsa, there was damage to a church, library, fire station, elementary school, four industrial buildings and 70 homes. Damage amounted to $8.5 million.
F0	S of Boynton	Muskogee	OK	35.63°N 95.65°W	May 4	0659	0.5 miles (0.80 km)	50 yd (46 m)	Brief tornado with no damage.
F1	NW of Hulbert	Cherokee	OK	35.95°N 95.18°W	May 4	0700–0701	3 miles (4.8 km)	100 yd (91 m)	Tornado touched down near Highway 51 and tracked northeast. A house trailer was damaged and trees/power lines were downed near the touchdown point. North of Hulbert, the tornado destroyed several sheds, damaged a mobile home, and uprooted numerous trees. Several barns also lost their roof.
F2	N of Eldorado	Schleicher	TX	30.95°N 100.73°W	May 4	0755–0915	23 miles (37 km)	250 yd (230 m)	A slow-moving tornado tracked along an intermittent path for over an hour north of Eldorado. Two barns lost their roof and several outbuildings were damaged. Eleven power poles and many trees were also snapped or downed.
F1	NE of Proctor	Adair	OK	36.00°N 94.73°W	May 4	0811	0.5 miles (0.80 km)	50 yd (46 m)	Brief tornado downed many trees.
F0	NNE of Norman	Cleveland	OK	35.32°N 97.40°W	May 4	1200–1203	2 miles (3.2 km)	50 yd (46 m)	Short-lived tornado with no damage.
F0	N of Hominy	Osage	OK	36.47°N 96.40°W	May 4	1230	0.5 miles (0.80 km)	50 yd (46 m)	Brief tornado confirmed by spotter.
F1	W of Clayton	Pushmataha, Pittsburgh	OK	34.58°N 95.58°W	May 4	1550–1551	1 mile (1.6 km)	50 yd (46 m)	Tornado touched down over an unpopulated along the Pushmataha–Pittsburg County line, causing only tree damage.
F1	S of Panola to S of Lequire	Latimer, Haskell	OK	34.88°N 95.22°W	May 4	1630–1650	14 miles (23 km)	100 yd (91 m)	Tornado remained over mostly open terrain or forested areas; however, some structural damage took place as it passed near Panola. Numerous trees and power lines were downed throughout its track.
F0	NW McCurtain to S of Keota	Haskell	OK	35.13°N 95.00°W	May 4	1700–1715	9 miles (14 km)	80 yd (73 m)	A weak tornado heavily damaged several barns near McCurtain. Numerous trees and power lines were downed along the storm's path.
F1	SE of Cowlington	Le Flore	OK	35.30°N 94.78°W	May 4	1721	0.5 miles (0.80 km)	75 yd (69 m)	Brief tornado destroyed two mobile homes, eight single-family homes, and two trailers. Several trees were also uprooted.
F1	S of Akins	Sequoyah	OK	35.43°N 94.70°W	May 4	1734–1737	2 miles (3.2 km)	80 yd (73 m)	Several barns were destroyed while several homes had roof damage. One mobile home was shifted off its foundation and several trees were downed.
F2	N of Clarksville, TX to NW of Idabel, OK	Red River (TX), McCurtain (OK)	TX, OK	33.83°N 95.05°W	May 4	1745–1810	14.6 miles (23.5 km)	100 yd (91 m)	Nine mobile homes and a frame house were destroyed in Red River County. Seven people were also injured. Numerous trees were downed, including a pecan orchard, in McCurtain County, Oklahoma.
F3	W of Short, OK to SW of Fayetteville, AR	Sequoyah (OK), Adair (OK), Crawford (AR), Washington (AR)	OK, AR	35.57°N 94.55°W	May 4	1754–1837	39 miles (63 km)	175 yd (160 m)	Tornado touched down over a rural area of eastern Oklahoma and tracked eastward into Arkansas. In Adair county, a hardwood forest was mostly leveled by the tornado. The tornado then moved into the Ozark National Forest within Crawford County, Arkansas, downing numerous trees. Impact to structures began near the communities of Hogeye and Strickland. There, two barns were destroyed and many homes sustained roof damage. Similar damage took place near the Cove Creek community where a garage was destroyed and a home lost its roof. The town's church was also shifted off its foundation.
F3	N of Tiffin	St. Clair	MO	37.98°N 93.93°W	May 4	1849	3 miles (4.8 km)	200 yd (180 m)	Short-lived but strong tornado touched down just north of Highway 82 and moved along an intermittent path. A modular home was completely destroyed, with debris scattered up to 1 mi (1.6 km) away and one person was injured.
F1	W of Buhler to SW of McPherson	Reno, McPherson	KS	38.13°N 97.80°W	May 4	1902–1918	8 miles (13 km)	150 yd (140 m)	Tornado struck a subdivision of Buhler, destroying 3 homes and damaging 34 others. Tracking northeast along an intermittent path along Highway 61, the storm moved into McPherson County. Significant damage occurred a few miles east of Inman where a cattleshed and irrigation system were destroyed.
F3	E of Mount Vernon, TX to DeKalb, TX to SW of Mineral Springs, AR	Franklin (TX), Titus (TX), Red River (TX), Bowie (TX), Little River (AR), Sevier (AR)	TX, AR	33.18°N 95.17°W	May 4	1904–2103	71.5 miles (115.1 km)	200 yd (180 m)	1 death – The longest tracked tornado of the outbreak first touched down in Franklin County, Texas, where damage was confined to trees. Moving into Titus County, the tornado destroyed seven homes, two of which were swept off their foundation, and killed one person. Lesser damage occurred in Red River County where a few outbuildings were impacted. The worst damage took place as the tornado moved into Bowie County and into downtown DeKalb. Much of the town was affected, with 170 buildings being damaged or destroyed along with the local high school. Despite the severity of damage, only 22 people due in part to tornado sirens being sounded 15 minutes in advance of the storm. The town was declared a federal disaster area and losses amounted to $125 million. In Arkansas, the tornado remained primarily over forested areas, downing many trees. Overall, the tornado remained on the ground for just shy of two hours along a 71.5 mi (115.1 km) path.
F0	SW of Salina	Saline	KS	38.68°N 97.80°W	May 4	1908–1930	5 miles (8.0 km)	55 yd (50 m)	Tornado remained over open country.
F0	SE of Carneiro	Ellsworth	KS	38.68°N 97.97°W	May 4	1915	1 mile (1.6 km)	55 yd (50 m)	Brief tornado with no damage.
F0	S of McPherson	McPherson	KS	38.30°N 97.67°W	May 4	1923	2 miles (3.2 km)	55 yd (50 m)	Tornado remained over open country.
F0	W of Ash Grove	Lincoln, Mitchell	KS	39.17°N 98.45°W	May 4	1945	2 miles (3.2 km)	55 yd (50 m)	Tornado remained over open country.
F0	S of Cole Camp	Benton	MO	38.45°N 93.20°W	May 4	1945	0.1 miles (160 m)	50 yd (46 m)	Brief tornado moved a shed 15 ft (4.6 m) and downed 15 trees and 2 power poles.
F2	Kilgore area (1st tornado)	Gregg, Rusk	TX	32.38°N 94.88°W	May 4	2003–2008	2.2 miles (3.5 km)	150 yd (140 m)	Tornado damaged or destroyed numerous homes and businesses in Kilgore before moving into rural areas. Overall damage amounted to $6 million. This tornado struck Kilgore three minutes before another tornado of similar intensity hit the town.
F2	Kilgore area (2nd tornado)	Gregg, Harrison	TX	32.38°N 94.88°W	May 4	2006–2023	9.7 miles (15.6 km)	150 yd (140 m)	Tornado occurred simultaneously with the 2003 UTC event. Major damage occurred for a second time in Kilgore, with the Stoneridge Apartment complex losing portions of its roof, ultimately resulting in it being condemned. Two people were injured by the storm and losses amounted to $19 million. The tornado continued east-northeast into Harrison County where was downed many trees before dissipating.
F0	WNW of Hallsville	Harrison	TX	32.52°N 94.62°W	May 4	2040–2044	2.2 miles (3.5 km)	25 yd (23 m)	Tornado remained over open country.
F1	NNE of Hallsville	Harrison	TX	32.55°N 94.55°W	May 4	2050–2058	4.6 miles (7.4 km)	50 yd (46 m)	Tornado occurred over a forested area.
F1	NW of Marion to NW of Burdick	Marion, Morris	KS	38.38°N 97.05°W	May 4	2135–2210	20 miles (32 km)	220 yd (200 m)	Tornado touched down near the Marion Reservoir and tracked northeast. The storm passed by Lincolnville, causing minor tree damage, before causing extensive damage to a home near Lost Springs. Moving into Morris County, one home was damaged along with its garage and barn.
F0	Grand Saline area	Van Zandt	TX	32.67°N 95.72°W	May 4	2200	0.2 miles (320 m)	15 yd (14 m)	Brief tornado with no damage.
F1	E of Patmos	Hempstead, Nevada	AR	33.50°N 93.52°W	May 4	2204–2214	4.8 miles (7.7 km)	50 yd (46 m)	Two chicken house were destroyed and one barn was heavily damaged. Numerous trees were also downed.
F0	S of Milford	Geary	KS	39.15°N 96.92°W	May 4	2215–2217	0.5 miles (0.80 km)	50 yd (46 m)	Tornado touched down near Milford Lake and caused minor damage to a marina.
F0	S of Hagarville	Johnson	AR	35.42°N 93.17°W	May 4	2215	0.1 miles (160 m)	25 yd (23 m)	Brief tornado with no damage.
F0	W of Seven Points	Henderson	TX	32.33°N 96.23°W	May 4	2220	0.2 miles (320 m)	10 yd (9.1 m)	Brief tornado with no damage.
F2	W of Plain Dealing	Bossier	LA	32.87°N 93.75°W	May 4	2228–2245	10 miles (16 km)	250 yd (230 m)	Two mobile homes were destroyed and several frame homes sustained roof damage. Numerous trees were downed along the path.
F1	SW of Dwight	Morris	KS	38.82°N 96.62°W	May 4	2230–2238	4 miles (6.4 km)	100 yd (91 m)	Tornado remained over open country.
F0	SE of Junction City	Geary	KS	38.92°N 96.68°W	May 4	2254–2304	5 miles (8.0 km)	100 yd (91 m)	Tornado remained over open country.
F0	SE of Arkadelphia	Clark	AR	34.10°N 93.05°W	May 4	2313	0.1 miles (160 m)	25 yd (23 m)	Brief tornado with no damage.
F2	E of Taylor	Columbia	AR	33.10°N 93.40°W	May 4	2315–2330	6.5 miles (10.5 km)	100 yd (91 m)	Tornado partially removed the roof of a frame home and heavily damaged a mobile home. Numerous trees were also downed.
F0	N of Alma	Wabaunsee	KS	39.07°N 96.28°W	May 4	2330–2333	1.5 miles (2.4 km)	75 yd (69 m)	Brief tornado with no damage.
F1	Tennessee Colony area	Anderson	TX	31.83°N 95.85°W	May 4	2338	1 mile (1.6 km)	150 yd (140 m)	Tornado touched down in Tennessee Colony, destroying four homes and damaging three others. A prison barracks was also damaged, resulting in four injuries.
F3	SE of Magnolia	Columbia	AR	33.25°N 93.22°W	May 4	2343–0005	9 miles (14 km)	100 yd (91 m)	Two frame homes were destroyed while several other buildings were damaged. Numerous trees were also downed.
F0	NW of Emmett	Pottawatomie	KS	39.33°N 96.10°W	May 4	0010–0011	0.2 miles (320 m)	25 yd (23 m)	Brief tornado with no damage.
F0	N of Palestine	Anderson	TX	31.80°N 95.63°W	May 4	0014	0.2 miles (320 m)	10 yd (9.1 m)	Brief tornado with no damage.
F0	SE of Havensville	Jackson	KS	39.48°N 96.03°W	May 4	0037–0038	0.2 miles (320 m)	30 yd (27 m)	Brief tornado with no damage.
F2	SE of Rusk to NW of Nacogdoches	Cherokee, Nacogdoches	TX	31.75°N 95.10°W	May 4	0052–0220	22.7 miles (36.5 km)	200 yd (180 m)	Long-lived tornado downed numerous trees along its path. No structural damage took place.
F0	WNW of Tomahawk	Lincoln	WI	45.47°N 89.75°W	May 5	2230	0.1 miles (160 m)	25 yd (23 m)	A brief tornado touched down near Tomahawk, damaging trees and power lines. One home and several vehicles were damaged by fallen trees.
F1	E of Kell	Marion	IL	38.50°N 88.87°W	May 5	2305–2307	0.2 miles (320 m)	75 yd (69 m)	Brief tornado destroyed two outbuildings and a mobile home; four people sustained minor injuries in the home.
F2	NE of Oakland City	Pike	IN	38.35°N 87.27°W	May 5	2340–2342	1.3 miles (2.1 km)	150 yd (140 m)	Tornado remained over mostly open terrain; however, one garage was damaged.
F2	NW of Winslow	Pike	IN	38.40°N 87.28°W	May 5	2345–2350	3 miles (4.8 km)	200 yd (180 m)	Tornado destroyed a mobile home and damaged twelve other homes. Extensive tree damage occurred.
F0	Cumberland area	Stewart	TN	36.40°N 87.65°W	May 5	2345–2346	0.5 miles (0.80 km)	100 yd (91 m)	Brief tornado touched down along Highway 149.
F0	SW of Clarksville	Montgomery	TN	36.40°N 87.65°W	May 5	2358–2359	0.5 miles (0.80 km)	100 yd (91 m)	Second brief tornado touched down along Highway 149.
F0	N of Yazoo City	Yazoo	MS	32.90°N 90.42°W	May 5	0000	1 mile (1.6 km)	40 yd (37 m)	Brief tornado with no damage.
F0	S of Belzoni	Humphreys	MS	33.15°N 90.50°W	May 5	0020	1 mile (1.6 km)	40 yd (37 m)	Brief tornado downed several trees.
F1	S of Greenwood	Leflore	MS	33.45°N 90.18°W	May 5	0020	1 mile (1.6 km)	50 yd (46 m)	A couple of mobile homes were blown over.
F4	Linden area	Perry	TN	35.57°N 87.92°W	May 5	0120–0128	6 miles (9.7 km)	580 yd (530 m)	3 deaths – Violent tornado struck the town of Linden, roughly 70 mi (110 km) southwest of Nashville. Many structures were damaged or destroyed in the small town of 1,300. Two people were killed when the home they were sheltering in was lifted off its foundation and thrown into a nearby wooded area. A third person was killed after she and her father were sucked out of their home; the father was found unharmed, however. Six people were injured throughout the town and damage amounted to $295,000.
F0	S of Greenwood	Leflore	MS	33.45°N 90.18°W	May 5	0145	1 mile (1.6 km)	40 yd (37 m)	Brief tornado with no damage.
F1	NE of Nashville	Davidson	TN	36.23°N 86.68°W	May 5	0245–0246	0.1 miles (160 m)	100 yd (91 m)	Brief tornado caused roof damage to a few homes.
F1	NE of Nashville	Davidson	TN	36.23°N 86.68°W	May 5	0245–0246	0.1 miles (160 m)	100 yd (91 m)	Brief tornado damaged the roof of one home.
F2	W of Goodletsville	Sumner	TN	36.30°N 86.80°W	May 5	0258	0.1 miles (160 m)	100 yd (91 m)	Brief but strong tornado severely damaged an apartment complex, condemning three buildings and leaving 100 people homeless. A post office and school also sustained roof damage. A total of 17 people sustained minor injuries and damage amounted to $1 million.
F0	N of Auburn	Logan	KY	36.88°N 86.70°W	May 5	0430–0431	0.1 miles (160 m)	50 yd (46 m)	Brief tornado with no damage.

== See also ==
- 1999 Great Plains tornado outbreak
- Tornadoes of 1999
