= 1999 Shreveport–Bossier City tornado =

1999 F4 tornado in the U.S. state of Louisiana

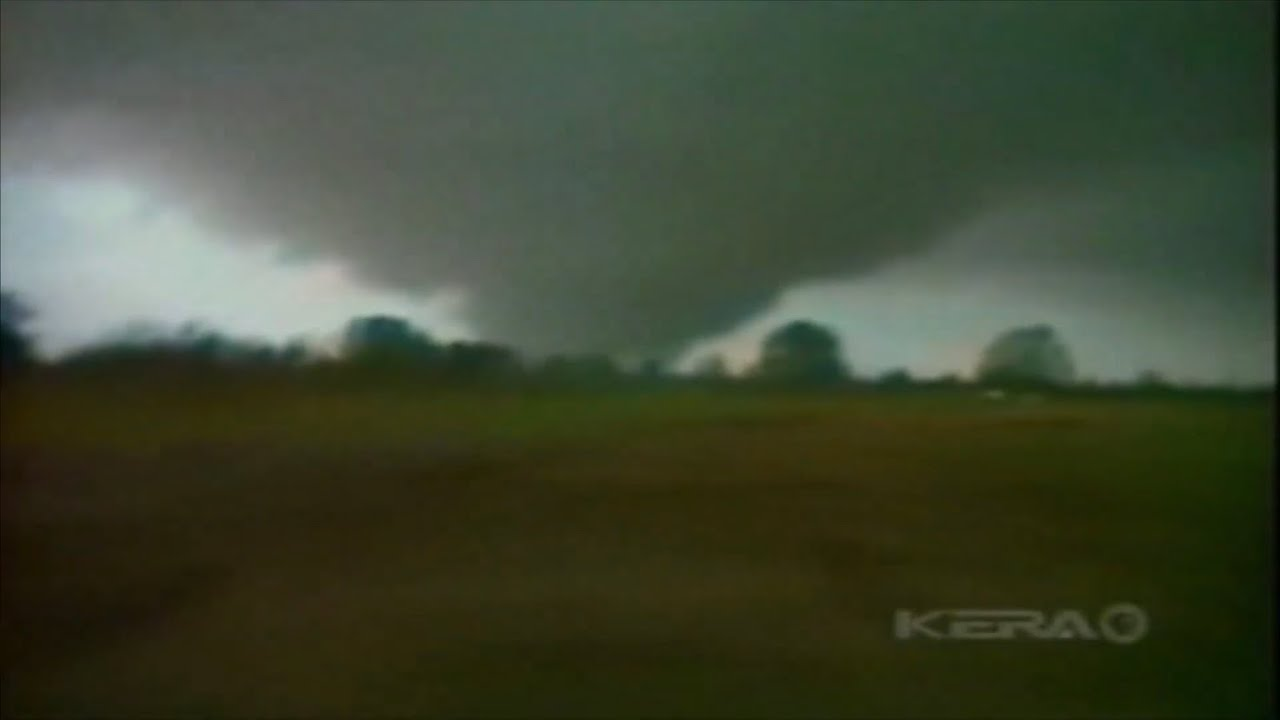
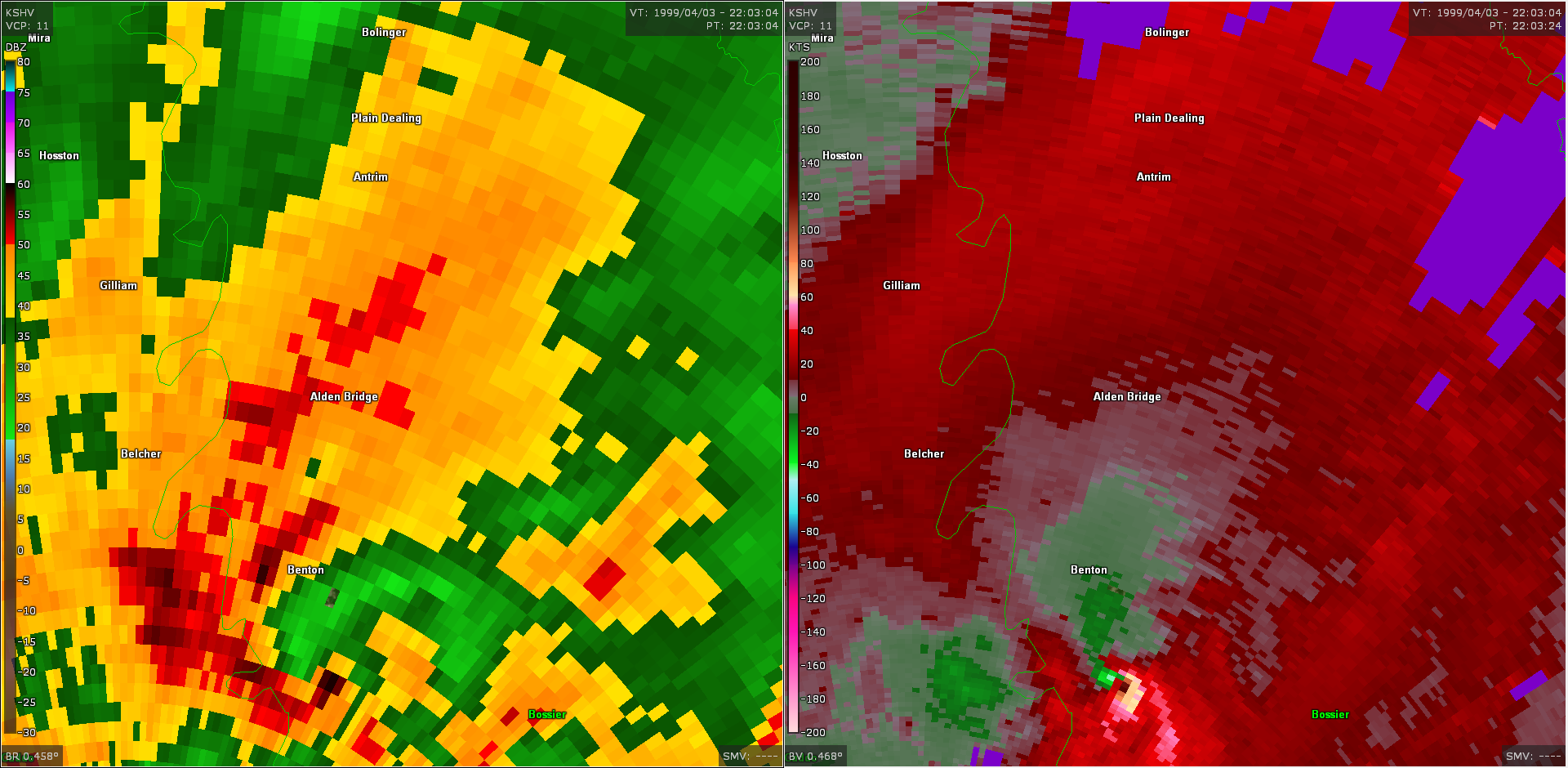
- Top: Photograph of the F4 tornado as it moved through Shreveport and Bossier City.; Bottom: NEXRAD radar image showing the F4 tornado north of Shreveport.

Meteorological history
- Formed: April 3, 1999, 3:52 p.m. CST (UTC−06:00)
- Dissipated: April 3, 1999, 4:20 p.m. CST (UTC−06:00)
- Duration: 28 minutes

F4 tornado
- on the Fujita scale
- Max width: 880 yards (0.50 mi; 0.80 km)
- Path length: 20.1 miles (32.3 km)
- Highest winds: 207–260 mph (333–418 km/h)

Overall effects
- Fatalities: 7
- Injuries: 102
- Damage: $7.94 million (1999 USD)
- Areas affected: Caddo Parish & Bossier Parish, Louisiana
- Part of the tornado outbreaks of 1999

During the afternoon of April 3, 1999, a violent tornado struck the northern neighborhoods of Shreveport and Bossier City, Louisiana. The most severe damage caused by the tornado was assessed by the National Weather Service in Shreveport, Louisiana, which rated the event as an F4 on the Fujita scale.

== Meteorological synopsis ==
On April 3, 1999, a favorable environment for severe thunderstorms developed across East Texas and northwest Louisiana. A deep upper-level trough over the western United States and a strong jet streak overspread the region, placing the Ark-La-Tex beneath an area of enhanced upper-level divergence that supported large-scale ascent. Mid- and upper-level winds were sufficiently strong to support supercell development.

At the surface and lower levels, a warm, moist, and unstable air mass was already in place during the morning hours, with temperatures in the 70s °F and dewpoints in the upper 60s °F. A cold front remained to the west, while a pre-frontal trough developed across northeast Texas during the afternoon, providing a focus for thunderstorm initiation. Increasing low-level winds and veering wind profiles with height resulted in strong vertical wind shear, creating an environment conducive to rotating supercells and the development of strong tornadoes.

== Tornado summary ==
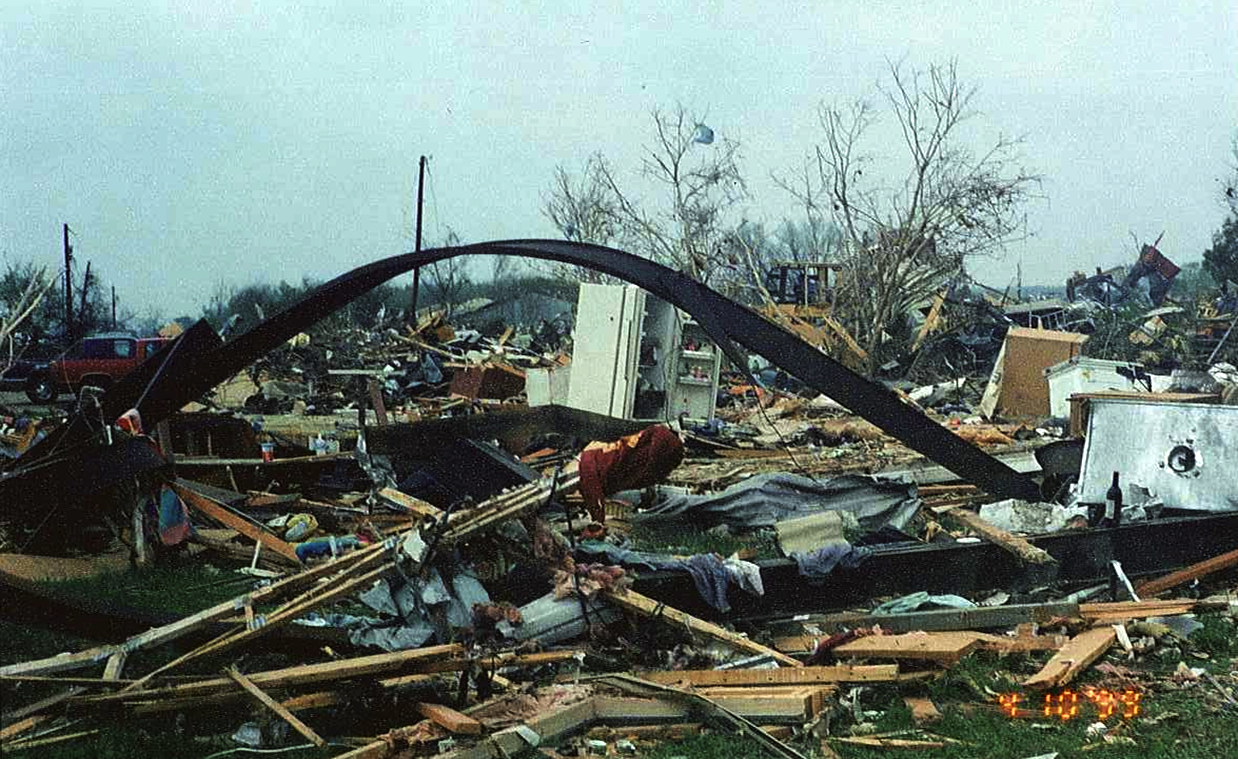
Significant damage at the Hay Meadow Mobile Home Park in Bossier City, Louisiana, caused by the F4 tornado.

The tornado first developed over Cross Lake in Caddo Parish and moved northeastward, producing minor to moderate roof damage to numerous homes along its initial path. An 18-wheel truck was overturned, and a steel-framed hardware store was destroyed. Additional damage was reported to other nearby industrial units as well as facilities at Southern University. In total, 66 structures were damaged in Caddo Parish before the tornado continued northeast and crossed the Red River into Bossier Parish.

After entering Bossier Parish, the tornado struck the Hay Meadow Mobile Home Park, where approximately 100 mobile homes were destroyed. It then continued northeastward toward Cypress Lake, where it ultimately dissipated. Across Bossier Parish, 389 structures were affected, including 227 homes or businesses that sustained either major damage or were completely destroyed. Roofs were removed from numerous buildings, and several brick homes were leveled; one brick home was entirely swept away, leaving only the foundation slab. Numerous large oak and pine trees were uprooted or snapped near their bases. The tornado was rated F3 in Caddo Parish and F4 in Bossier Parish on the Fujita scale.

Overall, the tornado resulted in seven fatalities, 102 injuries, and more than $7 million (1999 USD) in damage along its twenty-point-one-mile (32.3 km) path.

== See also ==
- List of North American tornadoes and tornado outbreaks
- Tornadoes of 1999
- Tornado outbreak of April 2–3, 1999
