= Tornadoes of 1999 =

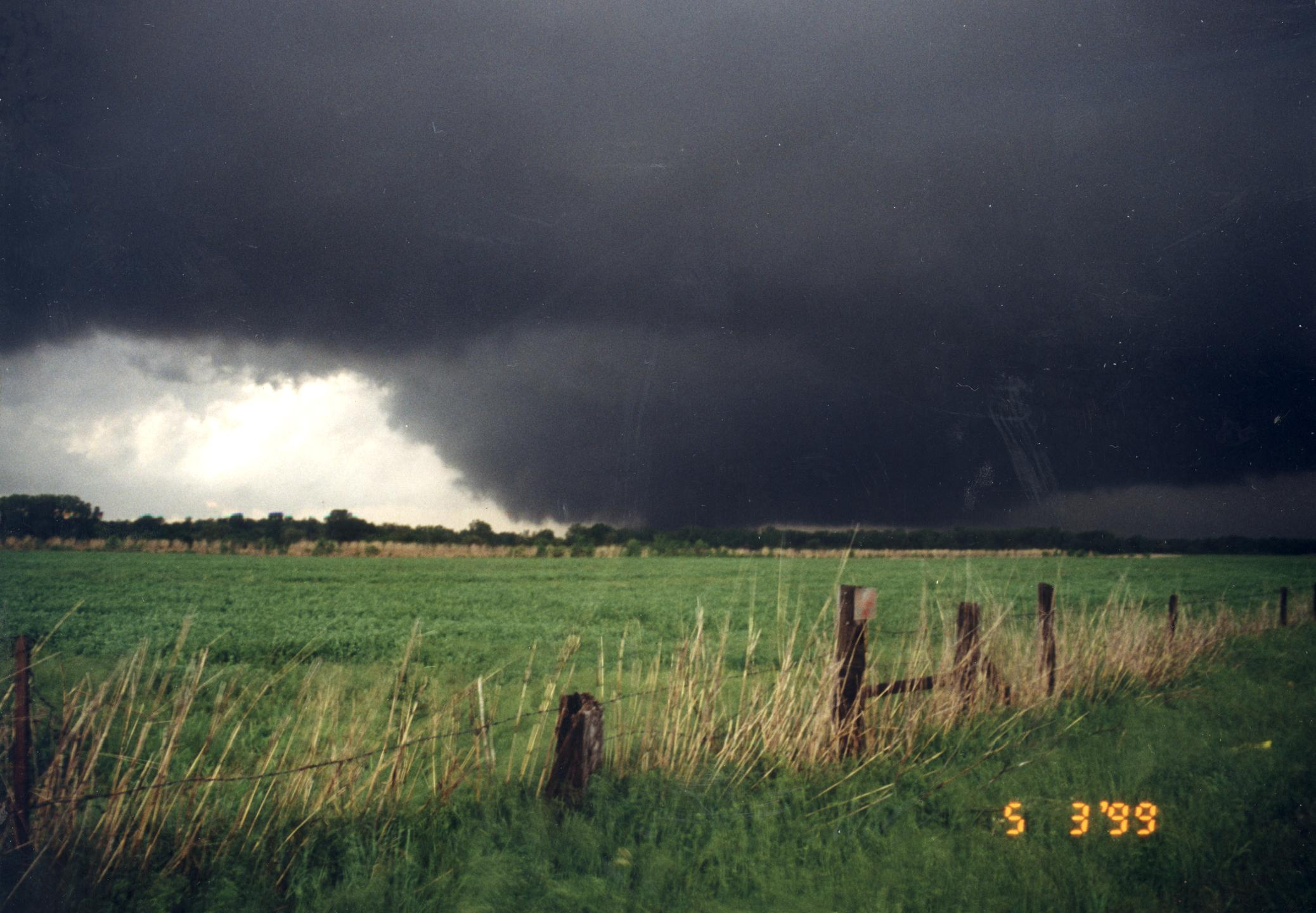
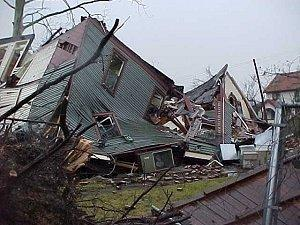
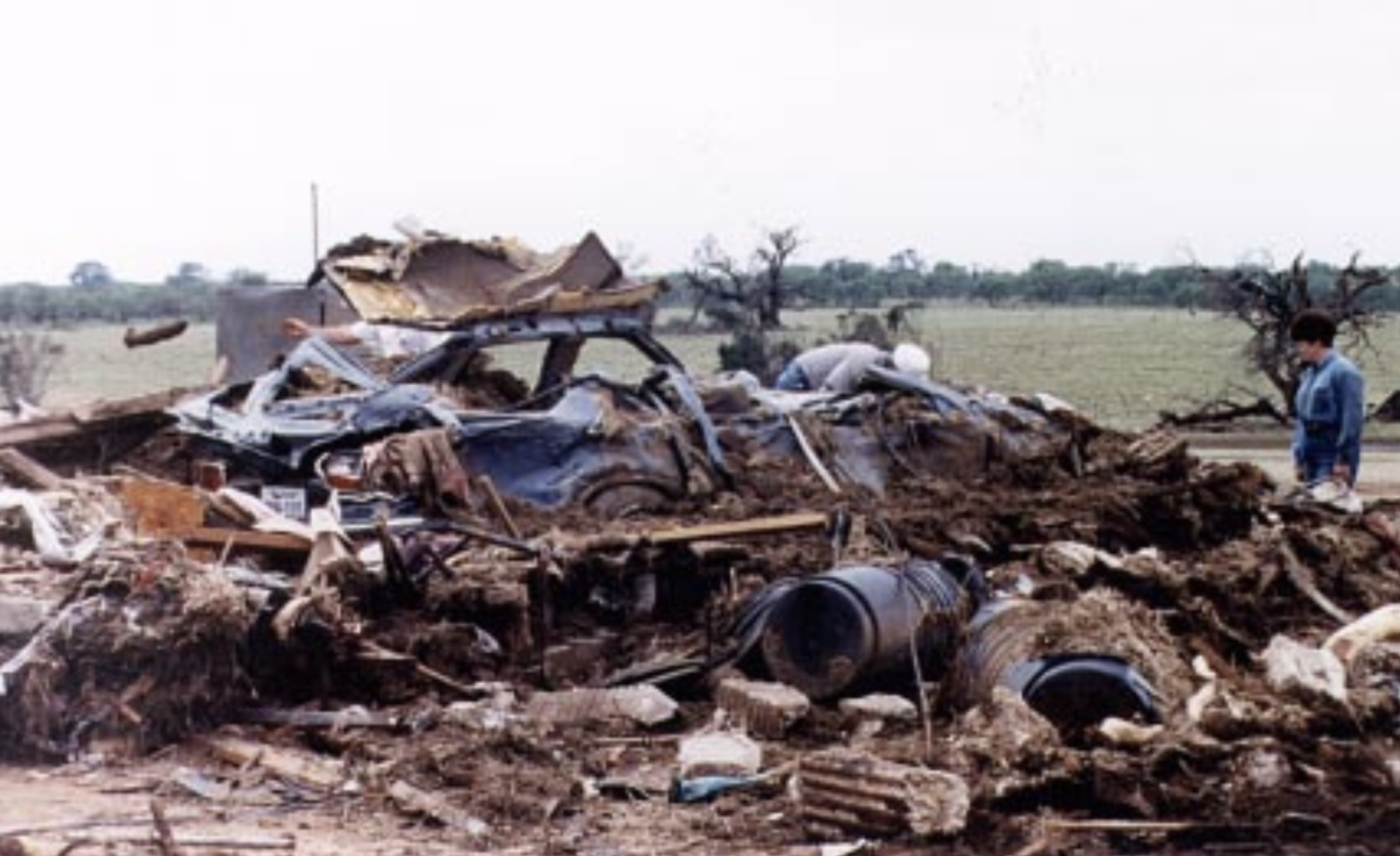
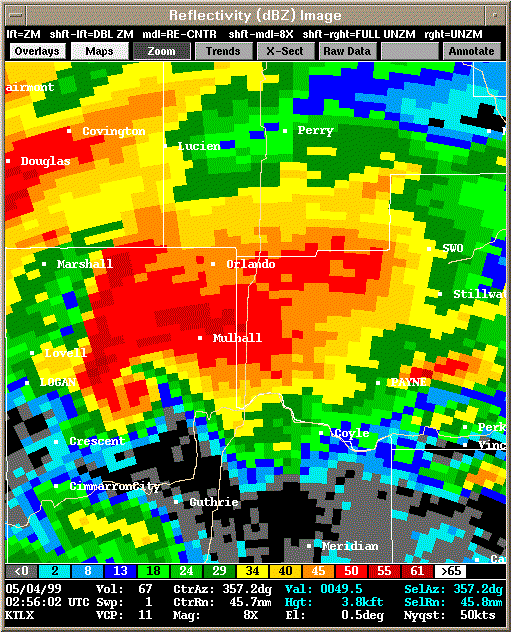
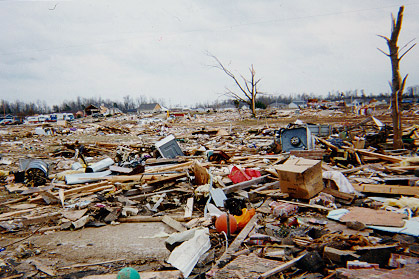
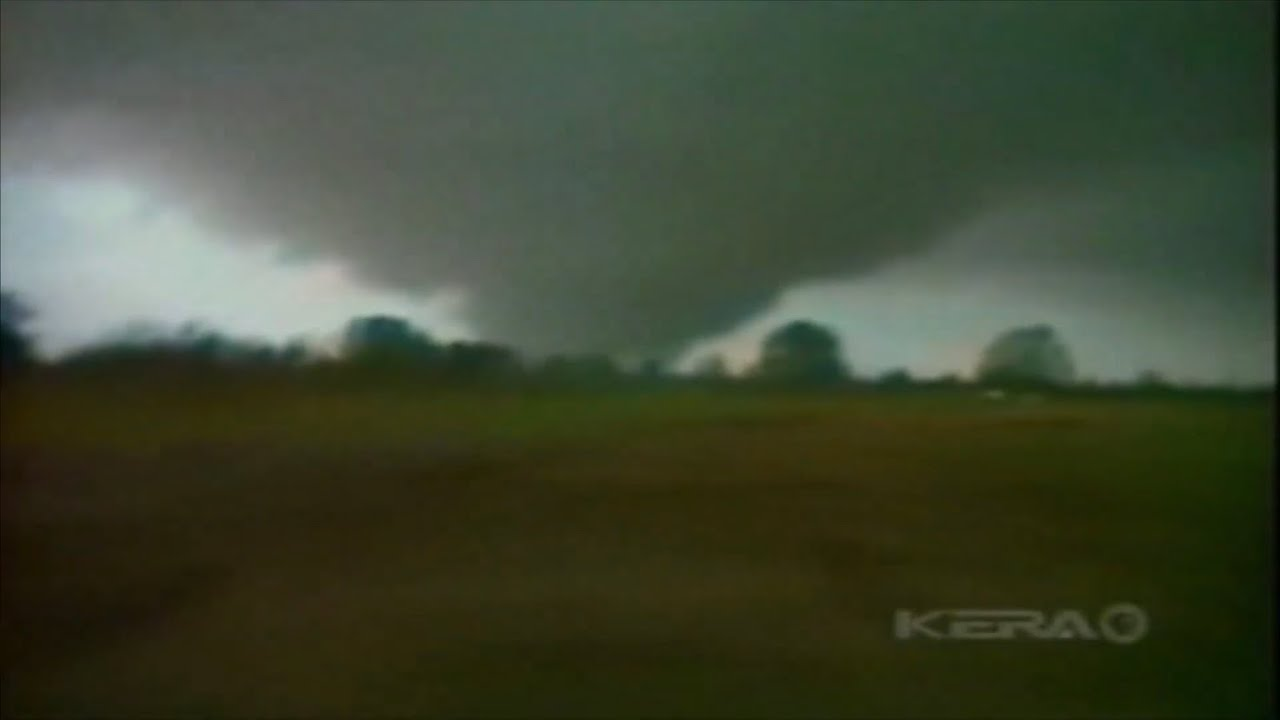
- Clockwise from top: A large F5 tornado near Bridge Creek, Oklahoma on May 3; A home in Loyal Valley, Texas after an F4 tornado on May 11; Damage to Jackson, Tennessee after an F4 tornado on January 17; A large F4 tornado in Bossier City, Louisiana on April 3; A radar image of a supercell producing a large F4 tornado southwest of Mulhall, Oklahoma on May 3; Damage caused by an F3 tornado that struck Little Rock, Arkansas on January 21.
- Timespan: January–December 1999
- Maximum rated tornado: F5 tornado: Bridge Creek–Moore, Oklahoma on May 3
- Tornadoes in U.S.: 1,339
- Damage (U.S.): $2 billion
- Fatalities (U.S.): 94
- Fatalities (worldwide): >137

This page documents the tornadoes and tornado outbreaks of 1999, primarily (but not entirely) in the United States. Most tornadoes form in the U.S., although some events may take place internationally, particularly in parts of neighboring southern Canada during the Northern Hemisphere's summer season, as well as Europe. One particular event, the Bridge Creek-Moore, Oklahoma F5 tornado, produced the highest wind speed ever recorded on Earth, which was 321 mph (517 km/h).

== Events ==
Fatal United States tornadoes in 1999
- Approximate touchdown location of killer tornadoes in 1999
Summary of tornadoes
- January 2 – Texas (1 death)
- January 17 – Tennessee (6 deaths)
- January 17 – Tennessee (1 death)
- January 17 – Tennessee (1 death)
- January 21 – Arkansas (2 deaths)
- January 21 – Arkansas (1 death)
- January 21 – Arkansas (3 deaths)
- January 21 – Arkansas (2 deaths)
- January 22 – Tennessee (1 death)
- March 2 – Texas (1 death)
- April 3 – Louisiana (7 deaths)
- April 8 – Illinois (1 death)
- April 8 – Illinois (1 death)
- April 9 – Ohio (4 deaths)
- April 14 – Mississippi (1 death)
- April 15 – North Carolina (1 death)
- May 3 – Oklahoma (36 deaths)
- May 3 – Kansas (6 deaths)
- May 3 – Oklahoma (1 death)
- May 3 – Oklahoma (1 death)
- May 3 – Oklahoma (2 deaths)
- May 4 – Texas, Arkansas (1 death)
- May 5 – Tennessee (3 deaths)
- May 11 – Texas (1 death)
- May 16 – Iowa (2 deaths)
- June 1 – Oklahoma (2 deaths)
- June 1 – Illinois (1 death)
- June 4 – South Dakota (1 death)
- August 11 – Utah (1 death)
- December 2 – Texas (2 deaths)
Total fatalities: 94

=== United States ===
Confirmed tornadoes by Fujita rating
FU	F0	F1	F2	F3	F4	F5	Total
0	830	323	122	51	12	1	1,339

During 1999, a total of 1,339 tornadoes touched down across the United States, ranking it as the eighth-most active year since reliable records began to be kept in 1950; at the time, 1999 was the fourth-most active year on record. The year began with the most active January on record, featuring 216 tornadoes. Culminating with the largest outbreak in the month, with over 100 tornadoes touching down on January 21 and 22 (surpassing the previous daily record of 39 on January 10, 1975), many records were broken. Due in large part to this outbreak, Arkansas saw more tornadoes in 1999 than any other year, with 107 recorded, and its most active January. The state also broke the record for most tornadoes in January of any state.

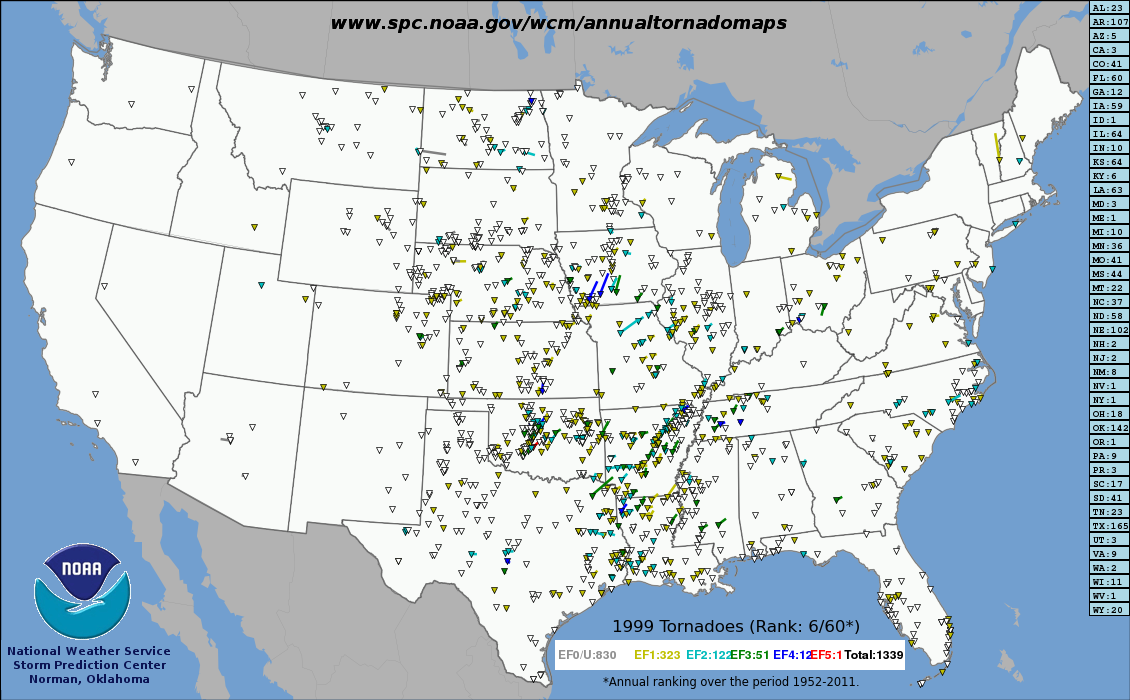
Map of 1999 United States tornado paths.

=== Europe ===
The European Severe Storms Laboratory maintains a database of all severe weather events across the continent. The vast majority of tornadoes go unrated due to a lack of surveys; however, some nations, such as France, provide detailed reports on these events. Of the 87 reported tornadoes during 1999, 45 were rated.

Confirmed tornadoes by Fujita rating
FU	F0	F1	F2	F3	F4	F5	Total
42	4	24	14	3	0	0	87

== January ==
Exceptional tornado activity took place across the United States in January, with 216 tornadoes touching down, more than ten times the average of 20. This set the record for most tornadoes recorded in the month, and more than quadrupled the previous record of 52 set in 1975. The extreme activity during the month was attributed to an unusually spring-like setup, with a warm, moist air mass from the Gulf of Mexico flowing northward into an area with strong upper-level westerlies. The synoptic set up of these factors was typical of March or April rather than mid-winter. January 1999 was the most active month for tornado activity in meteorological winter until it was later surpassed by December 2021, which had a total of 227 tornadoes in a similarly hyperactive month.

=== January 1–3 ===
FU	F0	F1	F2	F3	F4	F5
0	19	17	10	1	0	0

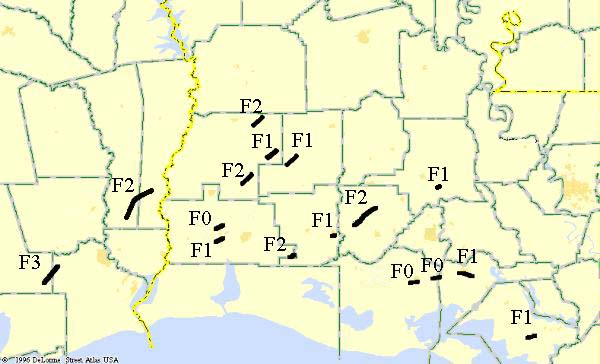
Map of tornadoes across Southeast Texas and southern Louisiana from January 1–2.

On January 1, a strong upper-level low moved over Southeast Texas, while an accompanying surface low formed over North Texas. A cold front extended southward from this surface low into the Gulf of Mexico. Ahead of this front, a strong low level jet formed, bringing a surge of warm, moist air from the Gulf northward. The combination of these factors resulted in an unstable environment favoring the development of rotating supercell thunderstorms. The sole fatality of the outbreak was from an F2 in East Texas.

=== January 17–18 ===
FU	F0	F1	F2	F3	F4	F5
0	9	9	3	2	1	0

This was the second of three major tornado outbreaks in January 1999. First set of tornado warnings were issued in eastern Arkansas where 2 tornadoes were confirmed, the first being near Wynne, Arkansas as an F1, and the second one spawned in Jonesboro, Arkansas, as a short lived F0, Also, 2 strong to violent tornadoes hit the Jackson, Tennessee areas. A total of 8 people were killed in this outbreak.

=== January 18 (South Africa) ===
On January 18, a violent F4 tornado struck Mount Ayliff and Tabankulu in Eastern Cape, South Africa. The majority of the towns were destroyed, with 95 percent of residents left homeless. Numerous vehicles were lofted significant distances by the storm, with one traveling 500 m (1,600 ft). This was the deadliest tornado on record in South Africa. 25 people were killed and approximately 500 others were injured.

=== January 21–23 ===
FU	F0	F1	F2	F3	F4	F5
0	69	36	13	9	1	0

January 21 saw 87 tornadoes touch down, making it the most active tornado day ever recorded in that month. In all, 128 tornadoes touched down and 9 people were killed. 56 tornadoes were confirmed in Arkansas, making this the largest tornado outbreak in Arkansas history. Many of the tornadoes were spawned along and to the east of the Interstate 30 and US Highway 67 corridor impacting many communities. including 2 strong tornadoes, one F3 in Newark, and an F4 near Corning. 6 weak short lived tornadoes passed through Craighead and Greene counties. The southern edge of the community of Manila in Mississippi County was also hit with an F2. Other tornadoes were reported near the vicinities of West Memphis, Helena, and Pine Bluff, Arkansas.

== February ==
There were 22 tornadoes confirmed in the US in the month of February.

=== February 13 ===
One person was killed and another was injured when a tornado struck Serik, Turkey.

== March ==
There were 56 tornadoes confirmed in the US in the month of March.

=== March 2 ===
FU	F0	F1	F2	F3	F4	F5
0	1	5	1	1	0	0

8 tornadoes touched down during the evening hours of March 2 over southeast Texas and southwest Louisiana. The strongest tornado was an F3 which touched down in Jasper and Newton counties in Texas, which caused 25 homes and a church to sustain severe damage, with one confirmed fatality. Another tornado, rated F2, touched down in Beauregard and Calcasieu parishes in Louisiana, with many trees falling down and causing a home to be destroyed 12 miles northwest of Sulphur.

== April ==
There were 177 tornadoes confirmed in the US in the month of April.

=== April 2–3 ===
FU	F0	F1	F2	F3	F4	F5
0	7	6	0	3	1	0

A series of tornado touchdowns struck from Kansas to Louisiana at the beginning of April. The most powerful tornado occurred in Caddo Parish and Bossier Parish in northwestern Louisiana where an F4 tornado killed 7 people and injured 107 others. The final outbreak tally was 17 tornadoes.

=== April 8–9 ===
FU	F0	F1	F2	F3	F4	F5
0	14	25	8	4	3	0

A widespread tornado outbreak affected the United States in early April 1999. It is best known for producing an F4 that killed four people in the Blue Ash and Montgomery, Ohio, areas.

== May ==
There were 310 confirmed tornadoes in the US in the month of May.

=== May 2–5 ===
FU	F0	F1	F2	F3	F4	F5
0	68	39	17	10	4	1

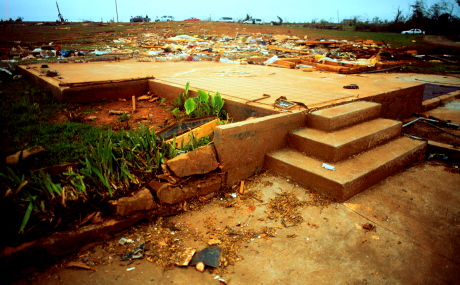
A home completely destroyed at F5 intensity in Bridge Creek, Oklahoma.

A massive tornado outbreak first struck the Southern Plains on May 2–4. The worst tornado was an extremely violent F5 tornado that tore through the Southern Oklahoma City metro area, killing 36. It produced a wind gust of 321 mph, the highest winds ever recorded on Earth. The outbreak then produced at least seven tornadoes in Tennessee on May 5. One F4 tornado struck Linden in Perry County, killing three people, while an F2 tornado struck Gallatin in Sumner County injuring 17.

=== May 9 (Cuba) ===
FU	EF0	EF1	EF2	EF3	EF4	EF5
0	0	0	0	0	1	0

The town of Cruces in Cuba sustained major damage from a violent tornado. Hundreds of brick, block and tile homes were completely destroyed, with 40 being destroyed and 224 others sustaining damage. Other damage included eight five-ton water tanks being thrown. This tornado was originally rated F4 on the Fujita scale, however, in 2023, it was rated EF4 on the Enhanced Fujita scale by the University of Havana.

=== May 9–12 ===
FU	F0	F1	F2	F3	F4	F5
0	29	3	0	1	1	0

A slow-moving cold front produced several days of severe weather and tornadoes across the Central U.S. From May 9 to 10, mostly weak tornadoes touched down from South Dakota to Texas. The most notable tornadoes occurred on May 11 as multiple supercells developed along the cold front in Oklahoma and Texas. Shortly after 6:00 p.m. CDT (2300 UTC), a 0.75 mi (1.21 km) wide multiple-vortex tornado struck Mason County, Texas. Remaining on the ground for 7 mi (11 km), the F4 tornado cleanly swept away two homes and scattered debris over great distances. In one of the homes, six people sought refuge in a car within their garage; debris smashed through the car, killing one and injuring the other five. A pick-up truck was torn apart and pieces of it were found 0.75 mi (1.21 km) away. 16 other homes were damaged by the tornado in addition to numerous barns and outbuildings. Numerous head of cattle and deer were killed and badly mangled. Trees were completely debarked, and a 720-foot (220 m) stretch of asphalt was ripped out by the tornado as well. A few hours later, an F3 tornado touched down in Gillespie County, Texas. The tornado damaged or destroyed 70 structures and tossed vehicles up to 100 yards (91 m). Damage from the storm reached $1 million. On May 12, activity was again limited to a few weak tornadoes.

=== May 15–17 ===
FU	F0	F1	F2	F3	F4	F5
0	22	7	2	2	0	0

On May 15, some tornadoes were reported including one near Stockton, Kansas.

The next day, several tornadoes touched down in Iowa. Two F3 tornadoes struck Harrison County, one of which struck a bus, killing two people on board and injuring several others.

=== May 15 (China) ===
On May 15, a tornado struck rural areas of Suixi County, Guangdong, China, killing 13 people and causing extensive damage. The majority of damage occurred in Qinge Village. Nine people were killed in the town while four others later died of their injuries. A total of 178 homes were destroyed while 489 more were damaged. An additional 51 people were injured, 35 seriously, and damage was estimated at $414 million.

=== May 30 – June 1 ===
FU	F0	F1	F2	F3	F4	F5
0	32	16	6	5	0	0

An outbreak produced 59 tornadoes across the Great Plains. On May 31, two significant tornadoes, rated F2 and F3, struck Lincoln County, Colorado, while a tornado formed over Sitka, Kansas. More intense tornadic activity occurred on June 1. An F3 tornado killed two people in Fort Gibson, Oklahoma, while another person was killed by an F3 tornado in Zanesville, Illinois.

== June ==
There were 289 tornadoes confirmed in the US in the month of June.

=== June 3–5 ===
FU	F0	F1	F2	F3	F4	F5
0	50	6	6	2	0	0

Tornadoes touched down across portions of the Great Plains on June 3. Two F3 tornadoes struck near Almena, Kansas and Elyria, Nebraska, while two F2 tornadoes struck near Comstock, Nebraska and southeast of Steele, North Dakota. More tornadoes, mostly rated F0, touched down on June 4, concentrating in two clusters; one in South Dakota and Nebraska and the other in Illinois. However, an F2 tornado did strike Oglala, South Dakota, killing one person. On June 5, a high risk for severe weather was issued for parts of South Dakota and Nebraska by the Storm Prediction Center as another violent tornado outbreak was expected. 21 tornadoes did touchdown that day, but they were all weak.

=== June 4 (Italy) ===
A supercell produced a tornado around San Quirino, Italy, causing damage to houses, sheds, and trees along a path width of about 300 m and length of less than 10 km.

=== June 6 ===
FU	F0	F1	F2	F3	F4	F5
0	30	5	2	0	1	0

An F4 tornado hit areas in and around Mountain, North Dakota. One farmhouse was completely lifted up and tossed 100 yards (91 m), a combine was also picked up and thrown several hundred feet, and a swather was picked up and wrapped around several trees. In town, numerous trees were knocked down, two mobile homes were destroyed, a house was unroofed, and a garage was destroyed. Other tornadoes also touched down that day across the Central United States, but the majority of them were short-lived and weak. There were no injuries or fatalities.

== July ==
There were 102 tornadoes confirmed in the US in the month of July.

=== July 8 ===
An F2 tornado touched down in Lewiston, Minnesota, causing some significant damage. Nearby homes and a farm implement dealer suffered damage. The tornado intensified right in the middle of town, and numerous homes suffered considerable damage with broken windows, damaged roofs and downed trees, with one home having their roof completely destroyed. More homes were damaged in the southeast portion of Lewiston before entering corn fields. A farm had every building except one house suffering from severe damage. Two minor injuries were reported, with 30 homes seeing some sort of damage, with four destroyed.

== August ==
There were 79 tornadoes confirmed in the US in the month of August.

=== August 8 ===
On August 8, severe thunderstorms in Suffolk County, New York produced an F2 tornado which traveled from northern Mattituck, to Cutchogue. The tornado injured one person and caused $1 million in damage.

=== August 11–13 ===
FU	F0	F1	F2	F3	F4	F5
0	6	5	1	0	0	0

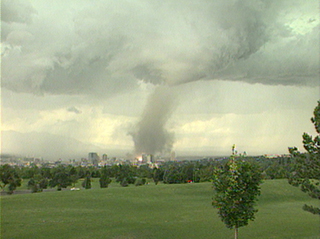
The F2 tornado seen in Salt Lake City while being taken from a park nearby.

On August 11, a cold upper-level trough moved into Utah. By the afternoon, a frontal boundary or convergence zone developed over the state. With sufficient wind shear and instability, thunderstorms that developed along this boundary became severe. One particular storm over the Salt Lake Valley grew to 41,000 ft (12 km) and produced a strong tornado that struck Salt Lake City. Touching down at 12:41 p.m. MDT (1841 UTC), the tornado quickly intensified as it moved through the metropolitan area for 4.3 mi (6.9 km). The F2 tornado damaged or destroyed 300 structures, including the Delta Center and the city's capitol building. Overall, one person was killed, 80 were injured, and losses amounted to $170 million, making it the most destructive tornado in the state's history. Attaining a maximum width of 150 yd (140 m), this tornado ranked as the largest on record in Utah. Four weaker tornadoes touched down across South Dakota and Wyoming on August 12. The following two days featured seven additional tornadoes, none of which exceeded F1 intensity. Alongside the tornadoes, straight-line winds caused extensive damage in many states from August 11–13. In Pitkin County, Colorado, one storm produced winds up to 115 mph (185 km/h), downing hundreds of trees over a 3-square-mile (7.8 km^{2}) area. These winds resulted in one fatality and $56.9 million in damage, the majority coming from crop damage.

=== August 14–15 ===
FU	F0	F1	F2	F3	F4	F5
0	12	0	3	0	0	0

On August 14, two tornadoes hit the small town of Lewistown, Montana. The first tornado, an F2, was on the ground for less than a mile. The second tornado's path is unknown. Reports said 150 homes were damaged, and hail affected almost everyone in the town. There were no fatalities and only one minor injury.

=== August 18 (Canada) ===
An extremely rare F0 tornado touched down in Pugwash, Nova Scotia, Canada. This tornado was only the sixth confirmed in Nova Scotia, tearing the dining room off a cafe, leaving the cook and their manager dazed.

=== August 29 (South Africa) ===
An F1 tornado struck Cape Flats, South Africa. Causing damage along a path at least 1 mi (1.6 km) long and 1,000 yd (910 m) wide, it moved through the impoverished neighborhood of Manenberg. At least four people were killed, while a fifth died from a heart attack, and 220 were injured. Approximately 5,000 people were left homeless.

== September ==
There were 56 tornadoes confirmed in the US in the month of September.

=== September 15 ===
FU	F0	F1	F2	F3	F4	F5
0	13	2	2	0	0	0

As Hurricane Floyd neared landfall in North Carolina, its outer bands spawned 17 tornadoes across the state. The majority were weak, though two produced F2 damage.

=== September 24 (Japan) ===
A tornado struck the city of Toyohashi, Aichi, Japan, destroying three homes and damaging many others. A total of 262 people sustained minor injuries, mainly school children, from shattered glass.

== October ==
There were 17 tornadoes confirmed in the United States in the month of October.

=== October 13 ===
A squall line originating in Illinois produced an F3 tornado in Pickaway County, Ohio, that destroyed several homes and injured six people. The storm was responsible for $4 million in damage.

=== October 15 ===
FU	F0	F1	F2	F3	F4	F5
0	3	1	0	0	0	0

As Hurricane Irene neared landfall in Florida, it spawned four weak tornadoes across the state.

=== October 21 (South Africa) ===
FU	F0	F1	F2	F3	F4	F5
0	0	1	0	1	0	0

A severe thunderstorm developed about 50 km (31 mi) south of Johannesburg, South Africa. Lasting about an hour and a half, the storm produced two tornadoes, rated F3 and F1, along its path. The first tornado was on the ground for roughly 100 km (62 mi) and had a peak width of 250 m (270 yd). The tornado mostly remained over open areas, though significant damage occurred in Heidelberg, Gauteng. There, 40 people sustained injuries and 400 structures were damaged. At an unknown point along the path, the tornado sucked up nearly all the water in a large shallow dam and deposited it on nearby hills.

== November ==
There were 7 tornadoes confirmed in the United States in November.

=== November 26 ===
A cold front moved into an unseasonably warm air mass over Pennsylvania, resulting in the formation of a tornado in Chester County. Rated high-end F1, the tornado destroyed 6 structures and damaged 26 more, leaving $3 million in losses; 12 people were injured.

== December ==
There were 15 tornadoes confirmed in the United States in December.

=== December 2–4 ===
Almost all of the tornadoes in December touched down between December 2 and 4. An F2 tornado in Oklahoma was on the ground for 12 mi (19 km), while an F1 tornado in Texas killed two people when it destroyed a mobile home.

=== December 9 ===
An isolated F3 tornado touched down in Yazoo County, Mississippi, destroying two mobile homes and downing thousands of trees.

== See also ==
- Tornado
  - Tornadoes by year
  - Tornado records
  - Tornado climatology
  - Tornado myths
- List of tornado outbreaks
  - List of F5 and EF5 tornadoes
  - List of North American tornadoes and tornado outbreaks
  - List of 21st-century Canadian tornadoes and tornado outbreaks
  - List of European tornadoes and tornado outbreaks
  - List of tornadoes and tornado outbreaks in Asia
  - List of Southern Hemisphere tornadoes and tornado outbreaks
  - List of tornadoes striking downtown areas
- Tornado intensity
  - Fujita scale
  - Enhanced Fujita scale
