= Tornado outbreak of April 2–3, 1999 =

Tornadoes in the United States on April 2–3, 1999

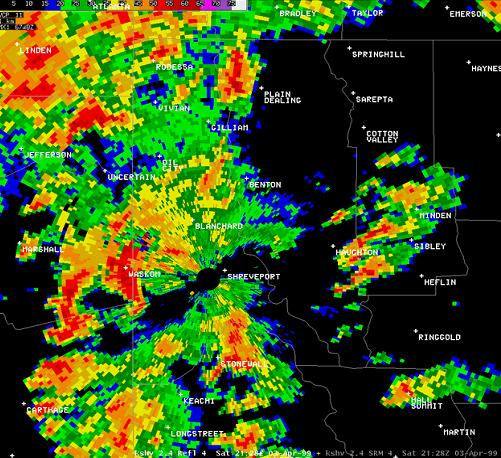
- Shreveport, Louisiana NEXRAD image at 3:28 pm.

Meteorological history
- Duration: April 2–3, 1999

Tornado outbreak
- Tornadoes: 17 confirmed
- Max. rating: F4 tornado
- Duration: 25 hours, 40 minutes

Overall effects
- Casualties: 7 deaths, 107 injuries
- Damage: $13.7 million (2006 USD)
- Areas affected: Kansas, Oklahoma, Texas, Missouri, Arkansas, and Louisiana

The Tornado outbreak of April 2–3, 1999 was a series of tornado touchdowns that occurred on April 2–3, 1999 from Kansas to Louisiana. The most powerful tornado occurred in Caddo Parish and Bossier Parish in northwestern Louisiana, where an F4 tornado killed 7 people and injured 102 others. Damages from the outbreak were estimated to be near $13.7 million (2006 USD). A total of 17 tornadoes were confirmed across the southern Great Plains during the two-day event.

== Tornado event ==
The first series of tornadoes touched down on April 2 across Oklahoma causing mostly minor damage to some structures.

The strongest tornadoes of the outbreak took place across the Arklatex region during the afternoon hours, where the strongest and lone killer tornado of the outbreak took place. At 3:52 PM, a supercell thunderstorm spawned a tornado over Cross Lake, north of Shreveport Regional Airport. The tornado moved northeast. In Caddo Parish the tornado damaged 66 buildings. In Caddo Parish, damages were estimated at nearly $1.6 million (2006 dollars). At 4:01 PM, the tornado entered Bossier Parish as an F4 tornado. In Bossier Parish, 227 buildings suffered major damage or were destroyed. An additional 162 buildings were damaged. Damages in Bossier Parish are estimated at near $6.7 million (2006 dollars). The tornado dissipated about eight miles northeast of Benton. In all, 7 people were killed and 102 were injured. The tornado was on the ground for about 20 miles. It reached a maximum width of 200 yards. It was Louisiana's deadliest tornado since February 21, 1971, when 10 people were killed east of Delhi.

Three additional tornadoes touched down beside the Caddo-Bossier Parish tornado. These tornadoes injured 1 person and caused up to $6.6 million in damages. Heavy damage was reported near Logansport, Summerfield and Athens heavily damaging several residences.

Weaker tornadoes (rated either F0 or F1) touched down across most of central and northern Arkansas into Missouri as well as in eastern Texas. 4 people in total were injured in two separate tornadoes near Ben and Mammoth Spring with isolated damage to some structures and also to trees and power lines. The outbreak ended just before 6 PM on April 3.

== Confirmed tornadoes ==
Confirmed tornadoes by Fujita rating
FU	F0	F1	F2	F3	F4	F5	Total
0	7	6	0	3	1	0	17

=== April 2 event ===
F#	Location	County	Time (UTC)	Path length	Damage
Oklahoma
F0	SW of Watchom	Noble	2145	1 mile (1.6 km)	Weak tornado with no damage.
F0	NW of Stafford	Custer	0107	0.3 mile (0.5 km)	Damage was limited to downed tree limbs.
F1	W of Bloomington	Harmon, Greer	0125	7.5 miles (12 km)	Barns, grain bins, and Quonset hut-type buildings were damaged.
F1	W of Moravia	Greer, Beckham	0213	6 miles (9.6 km)	Damage to grain silos, a barn, one house, an ostrich building, and tractors.
F1	S of Dill City	Washita	0250	1.1 miles (1.8 km)	A shed was destroyed while a house, trees, and power lines were damaged.
F0	N of Custer City	Custer	0355	1.1 miles (1.8 km)	Weak tornado with little or no damage.
Texas
F0	NE of Aspermont	Stonewall	2315	0.1 mile (0.16 km)	Brief touchdown with no damage.
Source: Tornado History Project - April 2, 1999 Storm Data

=== April 3 event ===
F#	Location	County	Time (UTC)	Path length	Damage
Kansas
F1	E of Stippville	Cherokee	1110	0.1 mile (0.16 km)	Three houses were damaged, one heavily.
Texas
F0	NW of New Waverly	Walker	2142	0.3 mile (0.5 km)	Damage was limited to trees.
F3	Logansport, Louisiana area	Shelby, De Soto (LA)	2151	5.4 miles (8.6 km)	Damage to farms, outbuildings, and numerous trees in Texas. In Logansport, Louisiana, several houses had moderate to heavy damage. A church’s steeple was knocked down and its roof was significantly damaged. One person was injured.
F0	Willis area	Montgomery	2217	0.3 mile (0.5 km)	Caused damage to a mobile home and trees.
Louisiana
F4	NW of Shreveport to N of Midway	Caddo, Bossier	2152	19.3 miles (30.9 km)	7 deaths – see article on this tornado Sixty-six structures in Caddo Parish were damaged including Southern University and several houses. A hardware store was also leveled. In Bossier Parish, 389 structures, including 227 houses and businesses, either sustained major damage or were completely destroyed. Brick houses were leveled with one reportedly swept away. Several horses were thrown across a highway. A total of 102 people were injured in Caddo and Bossier Parishes. All fatalities occurred in the latter.
F3	Athens area	Claiborne	2258	8.5 miles (13.6 km)	Two mobile homes were destroyed, and ten houses were heavily damaged.
F3	N of Lisbon to NW of Randolph	Claiborne	2313	14.5 miles (23.2 km)	15 houses were severely damaged.
Arkansas
F0	NW of Fivemile	Stone	2235	1 mile (1.6 km)	A few sheds and outbuildings were destroyed. Trees were also blown down. Two people were injured.
F1	Mammoth Spring area	Fulton, Oregon (MO)	2250	10.5 miles (16.8 km)	A mobile home and a barn were destroyed. Another mobile home, some houses, businesses, and a recreational vehicle were all damaged. Two people were injured.
F1	N of Getsemane	Jefferson, Lonoke	2325	6.5 miles (10.4 km)	Caused damage to outbuildings, signs, utility poles, and trees.
Source: Tornado History Project - April 3, 1999 Storm Data

== See also ==
- List of North American tornadoes and tornado outbreaks
