= Tornado outbreak of January 21–23, 1999 =

Weather event in the United States

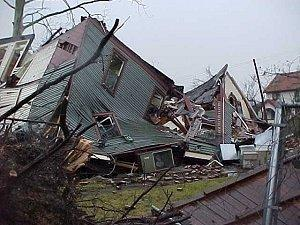
- A home destroyed by the F3 Little Rock, Arkansas tornado

Meteorological history
- Duration: January 21–23, 1999

Tornado outbreak
- Tornadoes: 128 confirmed (Record for a tornado outbreak in January)
- Max. rating: F4 tornado
- Duration: 46 hours

Overall effects
- Casualties: 9 fatalities, 162 injuries
- Damage: $90.5 million
- Areas affected: Midwestern and Southern United States
- Part of the Tornadoes of 1999

A large and destructive tornado outbreak struck the Midwestern and Southern United States between January 21–23, 1999. The outbreak mostly took place across the Mississippi River Valley. The outbreak as a whole was the largest tornado outbreak on record to occur during the month of January. Over the course of roughly two days, 128 tornadoes touched down across the region, resulting in widespread damage. Nine people were killed by the tornadoes. The outbreak is best known for an F3 that struck Little Rock, Arkansas, killing three people.

== Meteorological synopsis ==
On January 21, the Storm Prediction Center (SPC) issued a High risk of severe weather across much of central and eastern Arkansas, southwestern Tennessee, northeastern Louisiana, and much of northern and western Mississippi. The organization warned of the potential for a widespread severe weather outbreak, including several long-tracked and intense tornadoes. The meteorological setup unfolded as a broad upper-level trough, with its axis across the Central United States, rapidly amplified in conjunction with a 175 mph (282 km/h) jet streak across the southern Rockies. Substantial height falls—implying cooling in the mid layers of the atmosphere—coupled with the sharpening trough allowed for strong divergence to overspread the highest risk area. At the surface, a deepening area of low pressure initially centered near the Texas–Oklahoma border early on January 21 deepened and accelerated eastward, reaching the Arkansas–Missouri border during the overnight hours. A dry line extended southward across eastern Texas, providing increased mechanisms for rising air as it combined with a cold front and pushed eastward into Arkansas.

As the upper-level trough rapidly intensified, 500mb winds increased to 70–80 mph (110–130 km/h) and 850mb winds topped 70 mph (110 km/h) across the High risk area. The combination of speed shear and adequate directional shear (noted by curved low-level hodographs) led to 0–3 km storm relative helicities of 300–500 m^{2}/s^{2}, favorable for rotating thunderstorms. A capping inversion, qualified by cold and dry air aloft, initially prevented the formation of thunderstorms and instead allowed substantial surface heating. Surface-based CAPE values of 1500–2000 J/kg and most unstable CAPE values of 1000–2000 J/kg became prevalent across the broad warm sector. Low-level moisture transported northward from the Gulf of Mexico resulted in dew points in the low- to mid-60s °F by the afternoon hours. With continually strengthening wind fields, the capping inversion steadily weakened, and several tornadic supercells formed across Arkansas. In addition to the tornado outbreak, steep 850–500mb lapse rates, ranging from 6.5 to 7.5 °C/km, contributed to a favorable environment for gigantic hail and widespread damaging winds. Nine reports of hail over 2.51 in (6.4 cm) were received by the SPC.

== Confirmed tornadoes ==
Confirmed tornadoes by Fujita rating
FU	F0	F1	F2	F3	F4	F5	Total
0	69	36	13	9	1	0	128

=== January 21 event ===
F#	Location	County	Time (UTC)	Path length	Damage
Arkansas
F1	S of Lerch	Lafayette	2110	9 miles (15 km)	Little damage reported, primarily to trees.
F0	N of Cornelius	Lafayette	2133	1 mile (1.6 km)	Tornado remained in woodlands. Roads were blocked by trees but no buildings were damaged.
F0	NE of Lerch	Lafayette	2138	1 mile (1.6 km)	Tornado remained in woodlands. No damage.
F0	S of Genoa	Miller	2145	4 miles (6.4 km)	Tornado track remained in unpopulated farmlands.
F2	SE of Naylor	Faulkner, White	2157	10 miles (16 km)	Two manufactured homes were destroyed, along with two hay barns. The roof of a church was also damaged. Seven people were injured.
F1	S of Princeton (1st tornado)	Dallas	2229	7 miles (11 km)	Damage limited to many trees along its path.
F3	S of Princeton (2nd tornado)	Dallas	2229	11 miles (17 km)	Powerful and large tornado remained over rural areas, however, it obliterated a 1/4-mile (400 m) swath of trees along its path.
F1	Evening Star	Greene	2230	11 miles (17 km)	12 houses were damaged or destroyed. A church was also heavily damaged.
F0	Hickory Ridge	Cross	2233	unknown	Brief touchdown with no damage, but hundreds of geese killed.
F3	Sunnydale area	White, Independence	2238	19 miles (31 km)	Strong tornado up to 1/2-mile (800 m) wide damaged or destroyed many houses, including several flattened trailers. Extensive damage also to trees. Two people were injured.
F0	E of Knobel (1st tornado)	Clay	2245	12 miles (20 km)	Minor damage reported to one house.
F2	Center Hill area	White	2246	8 miles (13 km)	2 deaths – Tornado followed the Highway 305 corridor. Several mobile homes were thrown and destroyed, killing two occupants. Many other houses were damaged. Two others were injured.
F1	NE of Macon	Pulaski, Faulkner, Lonoke, White	2249	8 miles (13 km)	One house suffered a damaged roof and a mobile home was damaged. Extensive tree damage along the path.
F2	Oil Trough area	Independence	2255	20 miles (32 km)	Several houses were damaged or destroyed, along with numerous outbuildings. Widespread damage to trees and power lines. Three people were injured.
F3	S of Brinkley	Monroe, St. Francis	2302	36 miles (57 km)	Long-track tornado flattened one house and destroyed 20 others along its path, plus numerous farm buildings and outbuildings. Several transmission towers were knocked down. Nine people were injured.
F4	E of Knobel (2nd tornado)	Clay	2305	16 miles (26 km)	Violent tornado flattened two houses and damaged several others along its path. Two tractor trailers were destroyed.
F1	White Hall area	Jefferson	2311	14 miles (23 km)	Several houses damaged and barns destroyed before tracking into the Pine Bluff Arsenal. Several buildings were damaged on the Arsenal, primarily to roofs. After crossing the Arkansas River, several more houses damaged. Four people were injured.
F0	Garret Grove	Lee	2325	unknown	Brief touchdown with minimal damage.
F0	Goodwin	St. Francis	2325	unknown	Brief touchdown in town. Some minor damage reported.
F1	E of Tucker	Jefferson, Lonoke	2330	16 miles (26 km)	Several buildings damaged on the grounds of the Arkansas State Penitentiary. Significant tree damage along the path.
F1	S of Donaldson	Hot Spring	2334	2 miles (3.2 km)	Minimal damage, mostly to trees.
F1	SE of Donaldson	Hot Spring	2337	4 miles (6.4 km)	Formed as the previous tornado dissipated. No significant damage.
F1	S of Romance	White	2338	1 mile (1.6 km)	Several houses suffered minor roof damage.
F2	Joy area	White	2347	10-mile (16 km)	Several buildings were damaged, including an antique store and a fire department building. Several outbuildings were destroyed. Extensive tree damage was reported.
F0	W of Hoxie	Lawrence	0000	unknown	Short-lived tornado with minimal damage.
F3	NE of Oil Trough	Independence, Jackson, Lawrence	0005	39 miles (62 km)	Powerful tornado remained in rural areas. Extensive and severe damage to trees with swaths of forests up to 1/2-mile wide obliterated.
F2	W of Hazen	Prairie	0013	7 miles (11 km)	One house was destroyed and several others suffered varying degrees of damage.
F0	W of Colt	St. Francis	0015	unknown	Brief tornado with minimal damage.
F3	SE of Malvern	Hot Spring, Grant	0018	11 miles (17 km)	Tornado remained in mostly rural areas with extensive damage to trees. One chicken house was destroyed.
F2	Pleasant Plains area	White, Independence	0020	11 miles (17 km)	1 death – At least 30 houses, several businesses, a church and several barns were damaged, and a trailer was destroyed – killing an occupant.
F1	Des Arc area	Prairie	0021	17 miles (28 km)	Several buildings sustained minor damage, with the most impact on trees and power lines.
F3	Little Rock area (1st tornado)	Saline, Pulaski	0024	22 miles (35 km)	3 deaths – See section on this tornado
F2	Little Rock area (2nd tornado)	Pulaski, Lonoke	0042	11 miles (17 km)	See section on this tornado
F1	E of Palatka	Clay	0050	1 mile (1.6 km)	Short-lived tornado that damaged several houses.
F1	E of Sidon	White, Cleburne	0054	10 miles (16 km)	One woodworking plant was destroyed, and several outbuildings were also damaged. Trees and power lines were knocked down.
F0	W of Patterson	Woodruff	0102	4 miles (6.4 km)	Tornado remained over rural countryside; no damage reported.
F0	NW of Walnut Ridge	Lawrence	0105	unknown	Brief tornado touchdown with minimal damage.
F0	W of Bloomer	Sebastian	0111	1 mile (1.6 km)	Tornado reported by spotters at Highways 22 and 96. No damage reported.
F1	E of Ward	Lonoke	0118	2 miles (3.2 km)	Short-lived tornado that damaged 15 houses. One mobile home was heavily damaged, and several sheds and outbuildings were destroyed. One person was injured.
F2	Corning area	Clay	0125	7 miles (11 km)	Several houses sustained heavy damage. The Corning airport also sustained significant damage, with several hangars and airplanes destroyed.
F3	Beebe area	White	0125	8 miles (13 km)	2 deaths – Severe tornado touched down in the area. The Beebe Junior High School was heavily damaged, along with a church and fire hall. Many houses were damaged or destroyed, and gas leaks were reported in Beebe. 29 others were injured by this tornado, which was up to 2/3-mile (1.1 km) wide.
F2	Newark area	Independence	0133	7 miles (11 km)	Damage was reported to over 100 houses, several businesses and a church – mostly to roofs. Several trailers were destroyed.
F0	S of Jacksonville	Pulaski	0159	1 mile (1.6 km)	Brief tornado touchdown with minimal damage.
F0	E of Lanieve	Craighead	0210	5 miles (8 km)	Tornado remained in rural areas with minimal damage.
F2	Washington area	Hempstead	0213	21 miles (33 km)	Damage mostly to trees, including several large trees that fell onto several houses causing some structural damage.
F1	Newport area	Jackson, Independence	0220	9 miles (15 km)	Minor damage reported, mostly caused by falling trees. Three people were injured.
F0	Marmaduke	Greene	0250	unknown	Brief tornado touchdown. Damage limited to trees and power lines.
F0	W of Egypt	Craighead, Lawrence	0255	7 miles (11 km)	Three houses were damaged and an antenna was knocked over. One person was injured.
F0	Schug area	Craighead, Greene	0340	6 miles (9.6 km)	Two houses suffered minor structural damage. Several trees were also knocked over.
F0	Wilson	Mississippi	0355	unknown	Brief tornado touchdown with no damage.
F0	NW of Bay	Craighead	0400	3 miles (4.8 km)	Tornado remained in rural areas. Several trees blown down.
Mississippi
F1	E of Malvina	Bolivar	2110	2 miles (3.2 km)	Two mobile homes were destroyed, and minor damage was reported to several other houses.
F1	Cleveland	Bolivar	2116	2 miles (3.2 km)	One mobile home was overturned. Damage also reported to a business.
F0	NE of Shaw	Bolivar, Sunflower	0334	3 miles (4.8 km)	Weak tornado remained in open areas. No damage reported.
F0	SE of Boyle (1st tornado)	Bolivar, Sunflower	0334	13 miles (21 km)	Tornado tracked through many open areas. No damage reported.
F1	NE of Shaw	Washington	0433	3 miles (4.8 km)	Minor damage reported to a mobile home and several outbuildings.
F0	SE of Greenville	Washington	0440	1 mile (1.6 km)	Short-lived tornado sighted but remained in open fields.
F0	S of Belzoni	Humphreys	0445	3 miles (4.8 km)	Minor damage limited to trees.
F0	NE of Curtis Station	Panola	0445	8 miles (13 km)	One mobile home removed from its foundation.
F0	Senatobia	Tate	0459	7 miles (11 km)	Tornado remained in open areas. Damage was minimal.
F2	Blaine area	Sunflower	0502	15 miles (24 km)	Five houses were heavily damaged. One mobile home was destroyed and another was damaged. Two churches were also destroyed.
F0	SE of Boyle (2nd tornado)	Bolivar	0515	5 miles (8 km)	Tornado remained in open fields.
F0	W of Itta Bena	Leflore	0515	2 miles (3.2 km)	Large 4/10-mile (640 m) wide tornado spotted by storm chasers, but remained in open fields with no damage.
F0	NW of Ruleville	Sunflower	0525	10 miles (16 km)	Tornado remained in open fields.
Missouri
F0	NW of Sikeston	Scott	2250	1 mile (1.6 km)	Brief tornado touchdown with no damage.
F0	Fagus	Butler	2332	unknown	Brief tornado touchdown with no damage.
F0	Morehouse	New Madrid	2350	unknown	Brief tornado touchdown with no damage.
F0	E of Essex	Stoddard	0000	unknown	Brief tornado touchdown with no damage.
F0	NW of Cardwell	Dunklin	0005	unknown	Brief tornado touchdown. Minimal damage reported.
F1	SE of Benton	Scott	0015	1 mile (1.6 km)	A mobile home was overturned, and several outbuildings were damaged.
F0	NW of Kennett	Dunklin	0315	unknown	Brief tornado touchdown. Minimal damage reported.
F1	NE of Morehouse	New Madrid, Scott	0407	1 mile (1.6 km)	Damage primarily to trees along its path.
F0	Steele	Pemiscot	0410	unknown	Brief tornado touchdown. Minimal damage reported.
F1	NW of Dexter	Stoddard	0440	1 mile (1.6 km)	A mobile home was overturned and a shed was destroyed. In addition, many trees and power lines were knocked down.
F0	Perkins	Scott	0500	unknown	Brief tornado touchdown with no damage.
F1	W of Morley	Scott	0505	1 mile (1.6 km)	Heavy damage reported to a farm, including a destroyed barn and shed. A mobile home was overturned and minor damage reported to one house.
Louisiana
F1	NE of Bonita	Morehouse, Ashley (AR), Chicot (AR)	0115	37 miles (59 km)	Long-track tornado with minor to moderate damage to several houses. Widespread tree damage.
F1	Tallajuh area	Madison, Warren (MS)	0430	16 miles (26 km)	Many vehicles, including eight tractor trailers, were blown off Interstate 20. Several buildings sustained minor damage. Extensive damage to trees and power lines.
Tennessee
F0	Tiptonville	Lake	0528	unknown	Brief tornado with minimal damage.
Kentucky
F1	NE of Wickliffe	Ballard	0652	1 mile (1.6 km)	A mobile home was destroyed, injuring its six occupants. Barns and trees were also damaged.
F1	E of Kevil	McCracken	0700	1 mile (1.6 km)	Five mobile homes were heavily damage in the Lone Lake subdivision. Several other outbuildings and garages were destroyed and four houses sustained minor damage. Two people were injured.
Illinois
F2	SW of Golconda	Pope	0715	2 miles (3.2 km)	A summer resort in Shawnee National Forest (closed for the winter) was heavily damaged, with over 35 lodges damaged or destroyed along with many trees.
Sources: National Climatic Data Center

=== January 22 event ===
F#	Location	County	Time (UTC)	Path length	Damage
Louisiana
F1	Sadie area	Union, Grant (AR)	0800	17 miles (28 km)	Minimal damage, mostly to trees along its long path.
F0	E of King Hill	Natchitoches	1102	2 miles (3.2 km)	Tornado remained over swampland with no damage.
F0	S of Coushatta	Red River	1105	5 miles (8 km)	Tornado remained over swampland with no damage.
F0	NW of Messick	Natchitoches	1114	3 miles (4.8 km)	Tornado remained over swampland with no damage.
F0	SE of Coushatta	Red River	1120	2 miles (3.2 km)	Tornado remained over swampland with no damage.
F1	S of Cox Crossing	Bienville	1149	8 miles (13 km)	Significant tree damage reported in the heavily wooded area.
F1	S of Walker	Jackson	1152	20 miles (32 km)	Long track tornado remained in open woodland.
F1	E of Quitman	Jackson	1205	12 miles (20 km)	Tornado remained in open woodland with tree damage.
F1	E of Vienna	Lincoln	1222	12 miles (20 km)	Tornado remained in open woodland with tree damage.
F0	NW of Okaloosa	Ouachita	1230	2 miles (3.2 km)	Tornado remained over open woodlands with no damage.
F0	Evans	Vernon	1640	1 mile (1.6 km)	Brief tornado knocked down some trees in the area.
F0	NW of Gorum	Natchitoches	1609	3 miles (4.8 km)	Tornado remained over swampland with no damage.
F0	E of Aloha	Grant	1810	1 mile (1.6 km)	Tornado remained over unpopulated woodlands with no damage.
F0	Ferriday	Concordia	1915	1 mile (1.6 km)	Tornado remained in an open field.
F0	NW of Messick	Natchitoches	1114	3 miles (4.8 km)	Tornado remained over swampland with no damage.
Arkansas
F1	Felsenthal area	Union	0825	7 miles (11 km)	Numerous houses sustained minor roof damage.
F0	S of Eudora	Chicot	1423	2 miles (3.2 km)	Tornado remained in an open field with no damage reported.
F0	N of Kiblah	Miller	0153	4 miles (6.4 km)	Tornado tracked across woodland and farm country. No damage reported.
Tennessee
F3	S of Camden	Benton	0920	15 miles (24 km)	1 death – 12 houses were destroyed and many other houses and businesses were damaged. The fatality occurred outdoors. Five others were injured.
F3	Clarksville	Montgomery	1015	4 miles (6.4 km)	Severe damage reported in the city. 124 buildings were destroyed and over 500 others damaged, mostly in the downtown area. The county courthouse was nearly destroyed. Severe damage also took place at Austin Peay State University. Five people were injured.
F1	NE of Cordova	Shelby	1025	4 miles (6.4 km)	Two houses were destroyed, and numerous other houses and a school were damaged.
F2	McEwen area	Humphreys	1043	4 miles (6.4 km)	Significant damage in the community, where many houses were damaged (two of which were completely destroyed). One person was injured.
F0	Pocahontas	Hardeman	1805	unknown	Brief tornado touchdown, minor damage reported.
Mississippi
F0	Horn Lake	DeSoto	1110	2 miles (3.2 km)	Five houses were heavily damaged and numerous others sustained lesser damage.
F0	NW of Fayette	Jefferson	1525	1 mile (1.6 km)	Some trees were damaged and blown onto the Natchez Trace Parkway.
F0	E of Port Gibson	Claiborne	1545	1 mile (1.6 km)	Damage limited to a few trees.
F0	N of Utica	Hinds	1615	1 mile (1.6 km)	Damage limited to a few trees.
F0	Lexington	Holmes	1620	1 mile (1.6 km)	Tornado blew down some power lines.
F0	Raymond	Hinds	1658	1 mile (1.6 km)	Tornado touched down in open areas at the Raymond Williams Airport but no damage took place.
F1	Corinth	Alcorn	1835	5 miles (8 km)	Several houses and 31 businesses were damaged, and a metal industrial building was heavily damaged.
F0	Vaiden	Carroll	2032	1 mile (1.6 km)	Brief tornado in an open area spotted by the Mississippi Highway Patrol.
F0	E of Vicksburg	Warren	2040	4 miles (6.4 km)	A few trees were knocked down by this small tornado.
F0	W of Lexington	Holmes	2100	1 mile (1.6 km)	Tornado remained in an open area with no damage.
F0	Booneville	Prentiss	2115	unknown	Several trees were blown down near the town.
F0	Baldwyn	Lee	2310	unknown	Brief tornado touchdown with minimal damage.
F0	W of Osyka	Pike	2315	unknown	One house lost its roof in this brief tornado.
F0	Wheeler	Prentiss	2320	unknown	Brief tornado touchdown with minimal damage.
F0	SW of Topeka	Lawrence	2345	1 mile (1.6 km)	Several trees were blown down.
Texas
F0	S of Call	Newton	1630	1 mile (1.6 km)	Some trees were damaged by this brief tornado.
F1	New Boston	Bowie	2310	unknown	Brief tornado damaged several businesses in a commercial area along Interstate 30.
Alabama
F0	NW of Russellville	Franklin	2139	unknown	Brief tornado with no damage.
F0	SW of Muscle Shoals	Colbert	2143	1 mile (1.6 km)	Tornado remained in an open area.
F0	W of Falkville	Morgan	2243	unknown	Brief tornado near the Danville-Neel Recreation Area with no damage.
F0	NE of Fayette	Fayette	2252	unknown	A roof was damaged and several trees were uprooted.
F1	NW of Double Springs	Winston	2315	2 miles (3.2 km)	Three houses, two mobile homes and a church were damaged. Many trees were also damaged.
Sources: National Climatic Data Center

=== January 23 event ===
F#	Location	County	Time (UTC)	Path length	Damage
Virginia
F1	S of Indian Valley	Floyd	1930	0.2 miles (320 m)	Brief tornado destroyed two outbuildings and damaged a few other structures. Many trees were downed.
Sources: National Climatic Data Center

=== Little Rock, Arkansas tornadoes ===
Outbreak death toll
State	Total	County	County total
Arkansas	8	Pulaski	3
Arkansas	8	White	5
Tennessee	1	Benton	1
Totals	9		
All deaths were tornado-related

The Little Rock area was slammed by a strong tornado on the evening of January 21. The tornado began in Saline County south of Vimy Ridge at 6:24 pm CST (0024 UTC). Before crossing the Pulaski County line, it did moderate damage to several houses and significant damage to a mobile home. It crossed into Pulaski County at 6:33 pm, where moderate roof damage was reported to several buildings along the Interstate 30 corridor. It continued eastward and did most of its devastation just south of the downtown area.

There was severe damage reported to over 235 buildings, many of which were destroyed. One of the destroyed buildings included a large grocery store, a Harvest Foods, where one of two on duty pharmacists passed away. Over 500 other buildings sustained lesser damage. Some of the houses damaged that were in the historic district were also condemned due to there being lead smelt beneath them. Trees and power lines were also knocked down throughout the area. Damage was also reported on the property of the Arkansas Governor's Mansion, where many trees were knocked down. As the tornado left the downtown vicinity, it weakened as it crossed Interstate 40. It lifted in the northeastern suburbs, near Sherwood at 6:53 pm CST, after being on the ground for 29 minutes and travelling 22 miles (35 km). The first tornado was rated F3 on the Fujita scale.

As the first tornado dissipated, a second tornado, rated F2, developed in eastern Pulaski County. While it remained in more rural settings, it also destroyed several buildings, including a storage facility. It also knocked over several tractor-trailers before crossing into Lonoke County. Extensive damage was also reported in Lonoke County, where the South Bend community was hit hard. 12 houses, 11 mobile homes and several farm buildings were damaged or destroyed in Lonoke County. The tornado dissipated at 7:02 pm CST (0102 UTC) southwest of Cabot.

Three people died in the tornadoes (all due to the first F3). One of them was in the destroyed grocery store, another was in a vehicle hit by a tree, and the third was in a mobile home that was destroyed. 78 other people were injured by the tornado.

== See also ==
- List of North American tornadoes and tornado outbreaks
- January 17–18, 1999 tornado outbreak
- 1999 Oklahoma tornado outbreak
