= 1999 Mulhall–Perry tornado =

F4 tornado in Mulhall, Oklahoma

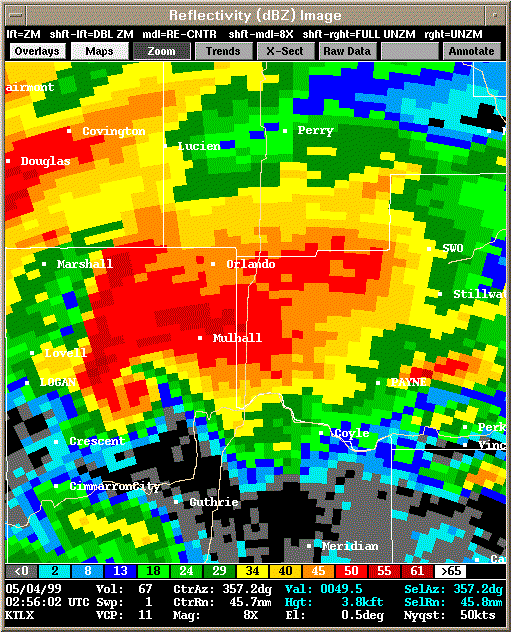
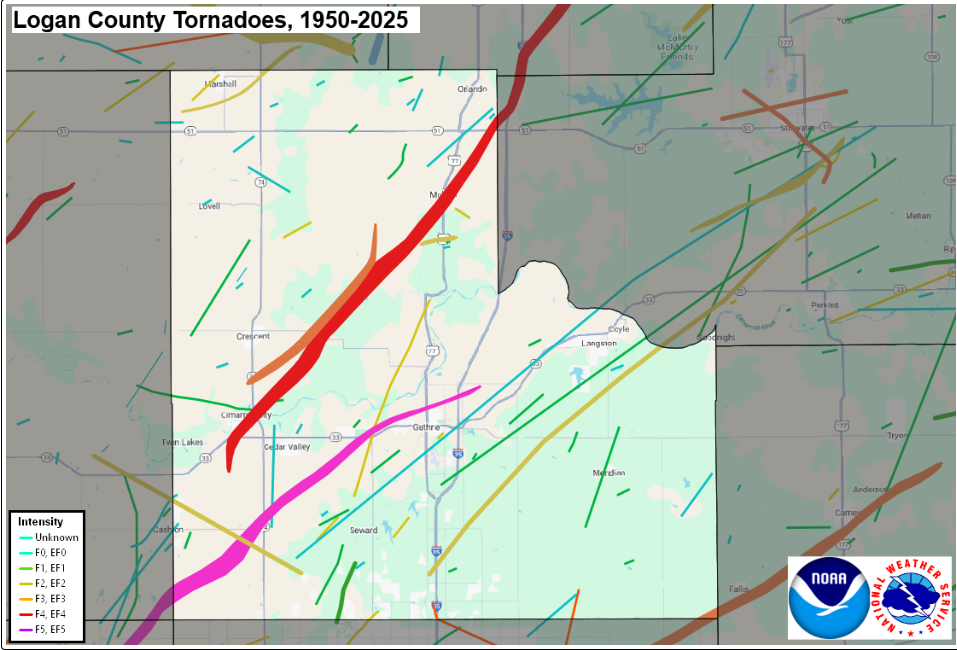
- Clockwise from top: View of the tornado near Mulhall; highlighted track of the F4 tornado in Logan County, Oklahoma; NEXRAD radar imagery of the supercell responsible for Mulhall tornado, denoted by a debris ball

Meteorological history
- Formed: May 3, 1999, 9:25 p.m. CDT (UTC−05:00)
- Dissipated: May 3, 1999, 10:45 pm. CDT (UTC−05:00)
- Duration: 1 hour, 20 minutes

F4 tornado
- on the Fujita scale
- Max width: 1,760 yards (1.0 mi; 1.6 km) (Note: The official maximum width of the F4 Mulhall tornado was 1 mi (1.6 km) according to the National Weather Service Office in Norman, Oklahoma; however, Doppler on Wheels measurements of the tornado indicated a windfield approximately 4.3 mi (6.9 km) in diameter, which would make it the largest tornado on record. This value remains unofficial, though.)
- Path length: 39 miles (63 km)
- Highest winds: 257 mph (414 km/h) (as measured by mobile Doppler radar)

Overall effects
- Fatalities: 2
- Injuries: 26
- Damage: $100 million (1999 USD)
- Areas affected: Logan, Noble and Payne Counties, Oklahoma, especially the towns of Mulhall and Perry
- Part of the 1999 Great Plains tornado outbreak and Tornadoes of 1999

During the nighttime hours of May 3, 1999, a deadly, long-tracked and violent high-end F4 tornado struck the town of Mulhall, Oklahoma, causing devastating damage in an around the surrounding regions. Known most frequently as the Mulhall tornado, this wedge tornado, which tracked a 39-mile (63 km) path, was very wide and at times exceeded one mile (1.6 km) in width. It occurred amidst a major tornado outbreak that took place across the region from May 2 to 5. According to storm chasing meteorologist Roger Edwards, it may have been as violent or more than the F5 Bridge Creek–Moore tornado from earlier that evening and potentially had F5 intensity prior to entering Mulhall; however, it was officially rated as an F4. The tornado dissipated at approximately 10:45 p.m. CDT in southeastern Noble County, 3 miles (4.8 km) northeast of Perry.

Shortly afterwards, many of the same areas of Logan County struck by the Mulhall tornado were hit again by an F3 tornado. However, this one was produced by a separate supercell that touched down 2.5 miles (4.0 km) south of Crescent at 10:56 p.m. CDT. Damage caused by this tornado was indistinguishable from damage caused by the earlier F4 tornado. 25 homes were destroyed and 30 others were damaged near Crescent, with much of the damage believed to have been caused by both tornadoes. The Mulhall tornado severely damaged or destroyed approximately 60–70% of the 130 homes in Mulhall, destroying the Mulhall/Orlando Elementary School and toppling the city's water tower. Large-scale search and rescue operations immediately took place in the affected areas. A major disaster declaration was signed by President Bill Clinton the following day (May 4) allowing the state to receive federal aid. In the following months, disaster aid amounted to $67.8 million. Reconstruction projects in subsequent years led to a safer, tornado-ready community.

== Meteorological synopsis ==
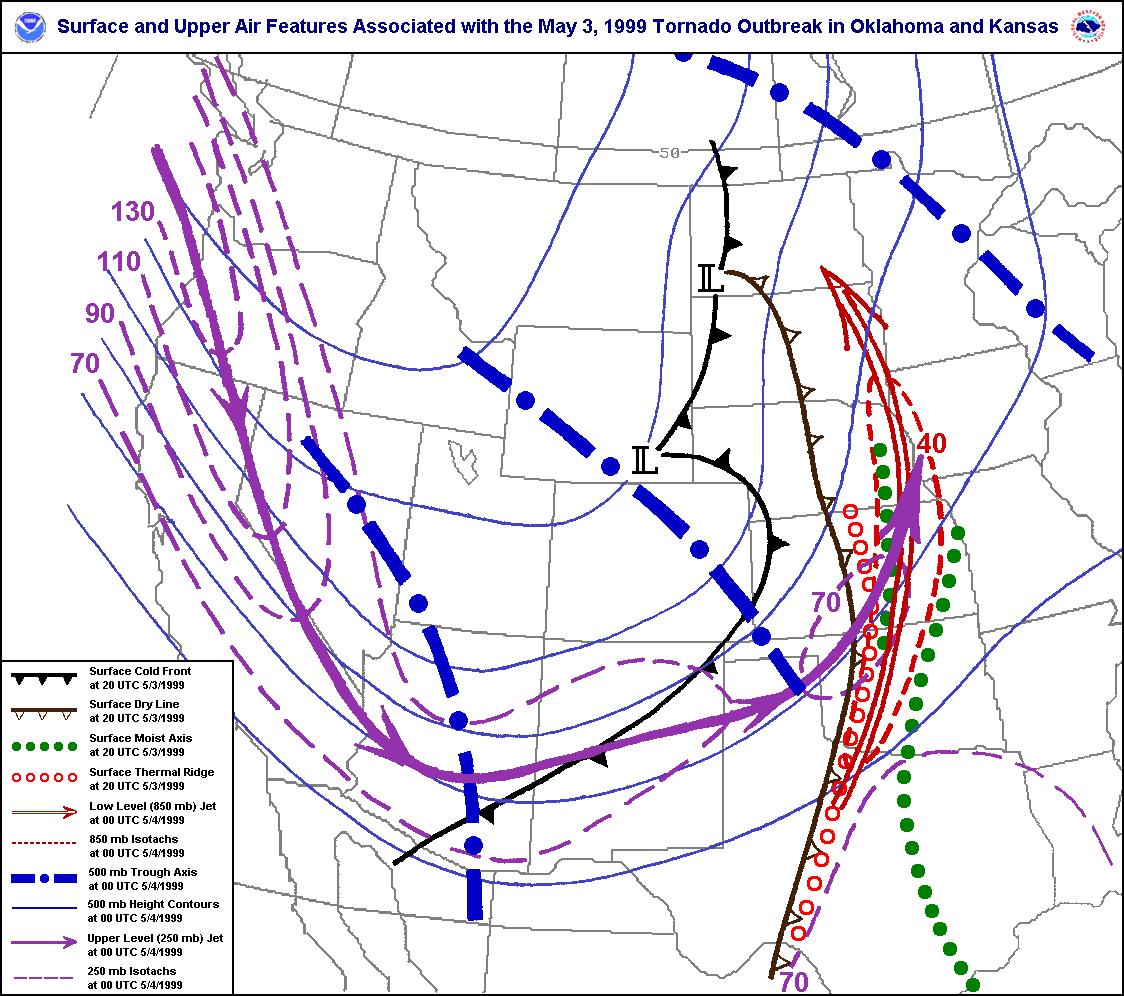
A map of the meteorological setup of the outbreak. The map displays surface and upper level atmospheric features associated with the outbreak.

The Mulhall tornado was part of a much larger outbreak which produced 71 tornadoes across five states throughout the Central Plains on May 3 alone, along with an additional 25 that touched down a day later in some of the areas affected by the previous day's activity (some of which were spawned by supercells that developed on the evening of May 3), stretching eastward to the Mississippi River Valley. The most prolific tornadic activity associated with the May 3 outbreak – and the multi-day outbreak as a whole – occurred in Oklahoma; 14 of the 66 tornadoes that occurred within the state that afternoon and evening produced damage consistent with the Fujita scale's "strong" (F2–F3) and "violent" (F4–F5) categories, which, in addition to the areas struck by the Bridge Creek–Moore tornado family, affected towns such as Mulhall, Cimarron City, Dover, Choctaw and Stroud.

=== Setup ===
The outbreak was caused by a vigorous upper-level trough that moved into the Central and Southern Plains states on the morning of May 3. That morning, low stratus clouds overspread much of Oklahoma, with clear skies along and west of a dry line located from Gage to Childress, Texas. Air temperatures at 7:00 a.m. Central Daylight Time ranged in the mid to upper 60s °F (upper 10s to near 20 °C) across the region, while dew point values ranged in the low to mid 60s °F (mid to upper 10s °C). The Storm Prediction Center (SPC) in Norman, Oklahoma, a division of the National Weather Service, initially issued a slight risk of severe thunderstorms early that morning stretching from the Kansas-Nebraska border to parts of southern Texas, with an intended threat of large hail, damaging winds and tornadoes. By late morning, the low cloud cover began to dissipate in advance of the dry line, but during the afternoon high cirrus clouds overspread the region, resulting in filtered sunshine in some areas that caused atmospheric destabilization. The sunshine and heating, combined with abundant low-level moisture, combined to produce a very unstable air mass. Upper air balloon soundings observed strong directional wind shear, cooling temperatures at high atmospheric levels, and the increased potential of CAPE values potentially exceeding 4000 J/kg, levels that are considered favorable for supercells and tornadoes.

=== Forecast and initiation ===
The SPC's Day 1 Convective Outlook for May 3, showing the Categorical Graphic

As observations and forecasts began to indicate an increasing likelihood of widespread severe weather conditions even more favorable for strong tornadoes, the SPC issued a moderate risk of severe weather at 11:15 a.m. CDT for portions of Kansas, Oklahoma and Texas along and near the Interstate 40 corridor.

... N CENTRAL TX/OK/SRN KS ...

LOW LEVEL JET WILL MAINTAIN SIGNIFICANT INFLOW OF LOW LEVEL MOISTURE WITH SURFACE DEWPOINTS AROUND 65F. CLEARING SKIES EVIDENT ON VISIBLE IMAGES WILL FURTHER CONTRIBUTE TO STRONG DESTABILIZATION OVER REGION WITH LATE AFTERNOON MUCAPES FORECASTED FROM 3500 TO 4500 J/KG OVER MDT RISK AREA. AS SHORT WAVE APPROACHES WRN OK/TX BORDER…LIFTING WILL DEEPEN NEAR/ALONG DRYLINE WITH THUNDERSTORMS INCREASING AS THEY MOVE EWD INTO INSTABILITY AXIS. 50 KT MID LEVEL SWLY FLOW SPREADING OVER LOW LEVEL JET AXIS WILL PROVIDE SUFFICIENT SHEAR FOR A FEW STRONG OR VIOLENT TORNADIC SUPERCELLS GIVEN THE ABUNDANT LOW LEVEL MOISTURE AND THE HIGH INSTABILITY.

— NWS Storm Prediction Center (SPC), May 3, 1999 1630 UTC Day 1 Convective Outlook

At 3:49 p.m. CDT, the SPC − having gathered enough data to surmise that there was a credible threat of a significant severe weather outbreak occurring within the next few hours − amended its Day 1 Convective Outlook to place the western nine-tenths of the main body of Oklahoma, central and south-central Kansas and the northern two-thirds of Texas under a high severe weather risk, denoting a higher than normal probability of strong (F2+) tornadoes within the risk area. About 40 minutes after the revised outlook's issuance, at 4:30 p.m. CDT, the SPC issued a tornado watch for western and central Oklahoma, effective from 4:45 p.m. until 10:00 p.m. CDT that evening, for the threat of tornadoes, hail up to three inches (7.6 cm) in diameter, wind gusts to 80 mph (130 km/h) and intense lightning. As that happened, the first thunderstorm cell of the unfolding event had already formed over southwestern Oklahoma.

== Tornado summary ==
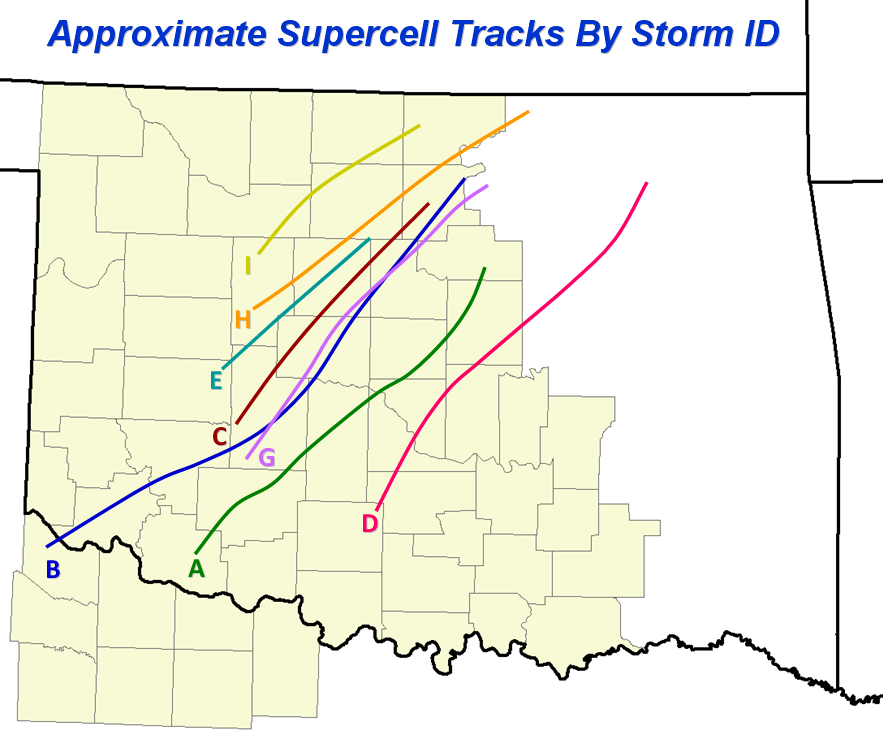
Approximate tracks of the supercells during the outbreak. The supercell that spawned the F4 tornado is marked "B" in blue.

The supercell thunderstorm that eventually produced the Mulhall tornado, designated as supercell "B" (NWS Norman designated lettered names for the three tornado-producing supercells in the outbreak in storm surveys) first developed in northern Texas around 4:20 p.m. CDT, near the city of Quanah, Texas. After crossing the Red River into Oklahoma, the cell performed a "right split", in which the supercell splits into two separate storms; the leftmost cell continued north and failed to produce any tornadoes, while the rightmost cell continued to the right east of the main wind shear vector. Over the next five hours, the supercell produced 19 weak tornadoes, one of which was rated an F2 that struck near Piedmont, while the rest were all rated F0 and F1. After the 19th tornado, an F0, lifted at 9:12 p.m., the associated mesocyclone in the supercell "cycled" and began showing signs of producing another tornado, of which would become the Mulhall tornado.

=== Formation, track into Abell ===
The tornado initially touched down at 9:25 p.m. CDT about 7 miles (11 km) southwest of the town of Crescent. It initially caused damage to areas near the intersection of State Highways 33 and 74, damaging two houses and a few businesses. Afterwards, it quickly strengthened and widened to 1 mile (1.6 km) in width as it tracked to the east of Crescent, crossing Oklahoma State Highway 74C, severely damaging multiple homes in the process. Here, the tornado became violent, causing F4 damage to a brick home, removing the walls of the house and partially removing the foundation of the home. The wedge tornado continued into the unincorporated community of Abell, causing additional F4 damage, and killing a woman within her home, with numerous power flashes visible. Six people were injured here as a result of the tornado.

=== Mulhall ===
Exiting the community of Abell, the violent tornado then tracked into the outskirts of the town of Mulhall. At this point, the tornado had reached a peak width of 1 mile (1.6 km), meaning that despite not tracking directly into the town, most of Mulhall was still subjected to the violent winds of the tornado. Widespread F4 damage was observed across the city, with numerous houses having roofs removed, while many other homes were either severely damaged or outright flattened at F4 intensity. Additionally, the city's water tower, its primary source of water for residents, was blown away and destroyed, while the Mulhall/Orlando Elementary School was destroyed. Two-thirds of the town of Mulhall was destroyed by the tornado. Remarkably, no fatalities occurred as a result despite the severe damage to the town, likely due to advanced warning time. Had it struck head-on, though, the damage may have been worse, as storm chaser Roger Edwards, who was chasing the tornado, claimed that based on his observations, the Muhall tornado may have been of F5 intensity on the level of the Bridge Creek–Moore tornado that had just occurred to the south.

A Doppler On Wheels (DOW) mobile radar that was traveling north on Interstate 35 observed this tornado as it crossed Mulhall. The DOW documented one of the largest ever observed core flow circulation with a distance of 1,600 m (5,200 ft) between peak velocities on either side of the tornado, a DX30 windfield extending up to 4.5 km (2.8 mi) and a roughly 7 km (4.3 mi) width of peak wind gusts exceeding 43 m/s (96 mph), based on a parametric damage-swath model. The DOW measured a complex multi-vortex structure, with several vortices containing winds of up to 257 mph (414 km/h) rotating around the tornado. The 3D structure of the tornado has been analyzed in a 2005 article in the Journal of the Atmospheric Sciences by Wen-Chau Lee and Joshua Wurman.

=== Noble County to Perry and dissipation ===
After exiting Mulhall, the tornado weakened considerably with lesser damage being observed to the north as it entered Logan County. It struck the Roselawn Cemetery and blew over several tombstones and fences, uprooting all of the trees within the cemetery. Approaching and then crossing over Interstate 35 in northwestern Payne County, it overturned a semi-truck trailer and flipped two nearby cars parked under an overpass; one person was killed when their car was sucked out from underneath the overpass and dropped on its top. The tornado then moved into Noble County, where additional damage occurred in the Boonsboro Addition, where 20 mobile homes were destroyed and several dozens of others severely damaged. Nearing the town of Perry, the tornado began weakening but caused one last portion of significant damage to three homes along U.S. Highway 64, resulting in one person being severely injured. The tornado then rapidly weakened and lifted at 10:45 p.m. CDT, approximately 3 miles (4.8 km) northeast of Perry.

=== Analysis ===
The Mulhall tornado was on the ground for approximately an hour and 20 minutes, reached a peak width of 1 mile (1.6 km), and tracked 39 miles (63 km), the second-longest track of the tornado outbreak it was associated with. Only 2 fatalities occurred despite the long-track and violent nature of the tornado, which may have been the result of advanced warning time. 26 people were injured as a result.

== Aftermath ==
About 80 percent of the town was destroyed. Following the destructive and widespread tornado outbreak, President Bill Clinton signed a major disaster declaration for eleven Oklahoma counties on May 4. In a press statement by the Federal Emergency Management Agency (FEMA), then-director James Lee Witt stated that, "The President is deeply concerned about the tragic loss of life and destruction caused by these devastating storms." The American Red Cross opened ten shelters overnight across central Oklahoma, housing 1,600 people immediately following the disaster. By May 5, this number had lowered to 500. Throughout May 5, several post-disaster teams from FEMA were deployed to the region, including emergency response and preliminary damage assessment units. The U.S. Department of Defense deployed the 249th Engineering Battalion and placed the U.S. Army Corps of Engineers on standby for assistance. Medical and mortuary teams were also sent by the U.S. Department of Health and Human Services. By May 6, donation centers and phone banks were being established to create funds for victims of the tornadoes.

Debris removal finally began on May 12 as seven cleanup teams were sent to the region, more were expected to join over the following days. That day, FEMA also declared that seven counties − Canadian, Craig, Grady, Lincoln, Logan, Noble and Oklahoma − were eligible for federal financial assistance. By May 13, roughly $1.6 million in disaster funds had been approved for housing and businesses loans. This quickly rose to more than $5.9 million over the following five days. By May 21, more than 3,000 volunteers from across the country traveled to Oklahoma to help residents recover. With a $452,199 grant from FEMA, a 60-day outreach program for victims suffering tornado-related stress was set up to help them cope with trauma.

Applications for federal aid continued through June, with state approvals reaching $54 million on June 3. By this date, the Army Corps of Engineers reported that 964,170 cubic yards (737,160 m^{3}), roughly 58%, of the 1.65 million cubic yards (126 ha-m) of debris had been removed. Assistance for farmers and ranchers who suffered severe losses from the tornadoes was also available by June 3. After more than a month of being open, emergency shelters were set to be closed on June 18. On June 21, an educational road show made by FEMA visited the hardest hit areas in Oklahoma to urge residents to build storm cellars. According to FEMA, more than 9,500 residents applied for federal aid during the allocated period in the wake of the tornadoes. Most of the applicants lived in Oklahoma and Cleveland counties, 3,800 and 3,757 persons respectively. In all, disaster recovery aid for the tornadoes amounted to roughly $67.8 million by the end of July 2.

== See also ==
- List of North American tornadoes and tornado outbreaks
- List of tornadoes in the 1999 Great Plains tornado outbreak − a chronological list of the tornadoes (as compiled in National Weather Service damage surveys and local storm reports) that occurred over the seven-day period of the outbreak from May 2 to 5, 1999
- List of Cleveland County, Oklahoma tornadoes
- 1999 Bridge Creek–Moore tornado - a violent F5 tornado that struck areas South of Mulhall just hours earlier
