= Four Counties Corner, Oklahoma =

- Unincorporated community
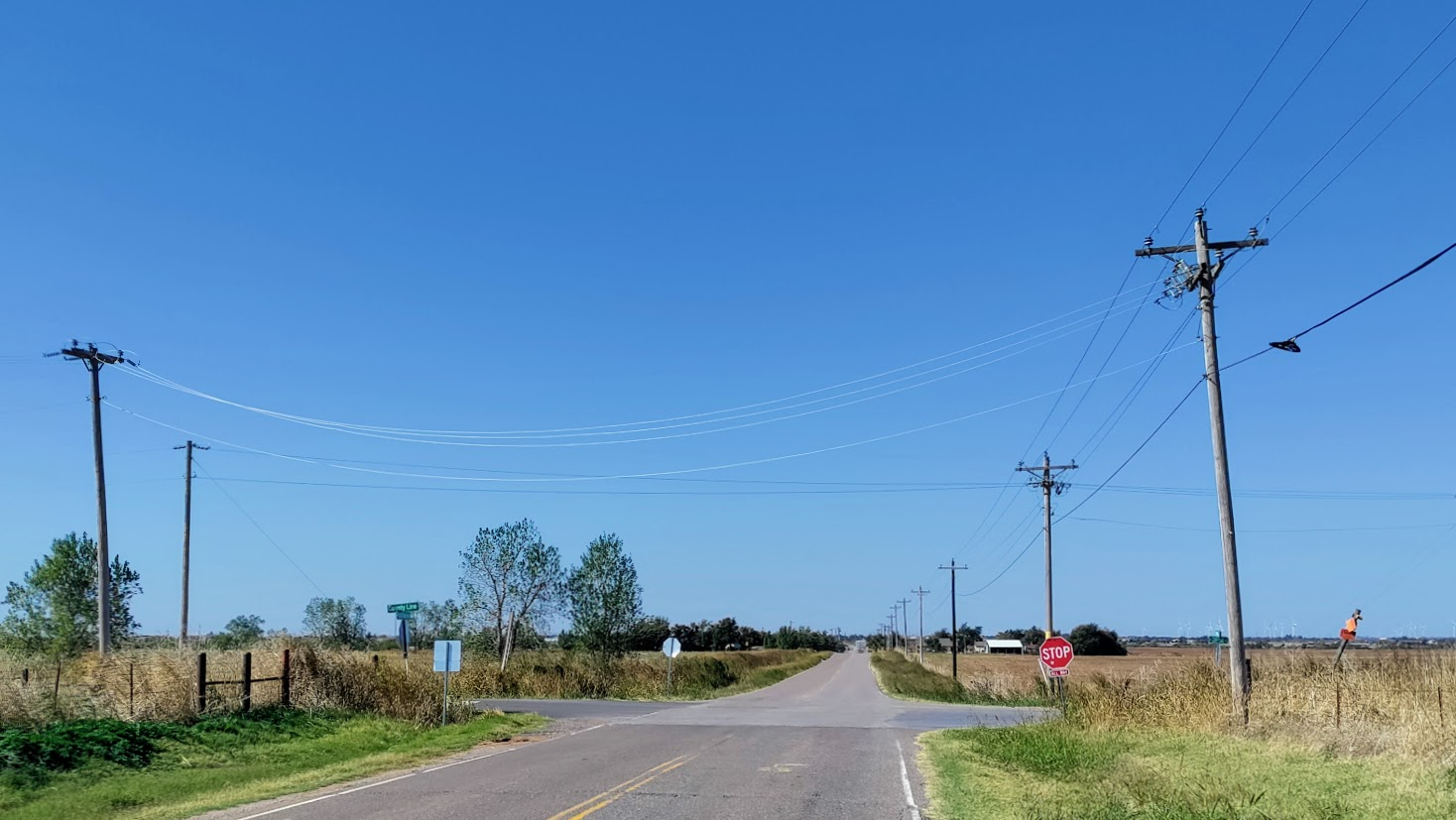

- Location within the state of Oklahoma Four Counties Corner (the United States)
- Coordinates: 35°43′33.37″N 97°40′26.18″W
- Country: United States
- State: Oklahoma
- County: Oklahoma, Kingfisher, Logan, Canadian
- Elevation: 1,165 ft (355 m)
- Time zone: UTC-6 (Central (CST))
  - Summer (DST): UTC-5 (CDT)
- Area code: 405

Four Counties Corner is a suburban unincorporated community that is centered on the quad-point where four counties meet: Kingfisher, Logan, Oklahoma and Canadian. It is one of only two such county quad-points in the state of Oklahoma, and is also a public school district tri-point, with the districts of Deer Creek, Cashion, and Piedmont all meeting at this same corner.

It was previously known as "Lockridge."

== History ==
The community was first known as "Lockridge," a small community created after the land run of 1889, the name being derived from the first letters of the four counties that meet at the ridge near the quad-point. At its height (in the first decade of the 1900s) the town had five general stores, a drug store, a hardware store, two saloons, a train depot, two grain elevators, a cotton gin, a creamery, a post office, a service station and garage, and a telephone company.

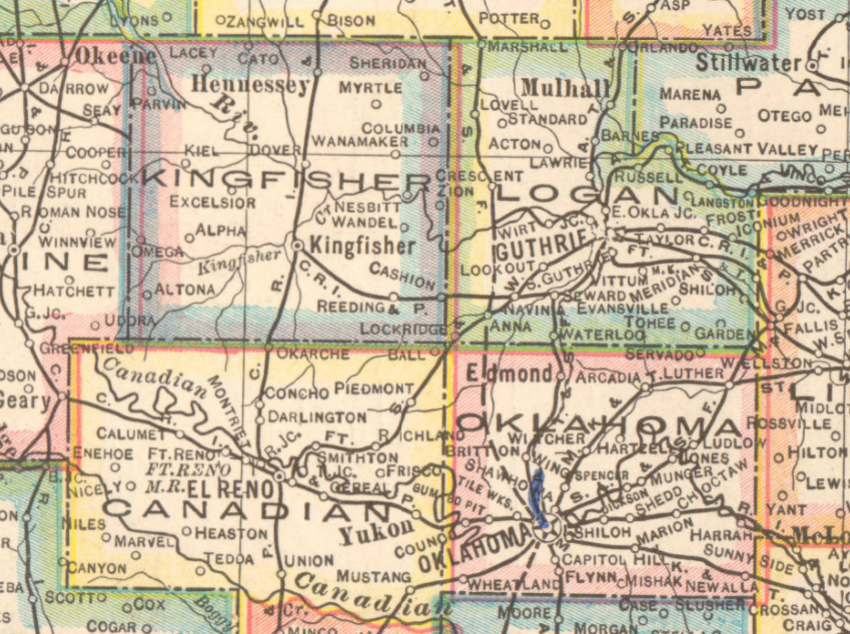
Detail from 1910 Oklahoma Map that shows Lockridge at the junction of 4 counties

The town went into serious decline in 1922 when the St. Louis, El Reno and Western Railway closed its depot in Lockridge, with most of the businesses closing over the next two decades, and the post office closing in 1928.

St. Patrick's Catholic Church (one of the oldest rural Catholic churches in Oklahoma) was open from 1891 to 1959, until 1967 when the building burned down, but the cemetery remains.

== Present ==
Today, Four Counties Corner is in the process of transitioning from a rural community to a suburban one, with growing population in the area due to the expansion of the Oklahoma City metropolitan area.

The Four Counties electric substation of Western Farmers Electric Coop (built in 2021) is located one mile west of the quad-point and serves electric customers throughout the four county area.
