= Oklahoma City metropolitan area =

Oklahoma City Metropolitan Area
- Metropolitan Statistical Area
- Oklahoma City, OK Metropolitan Statistical Area
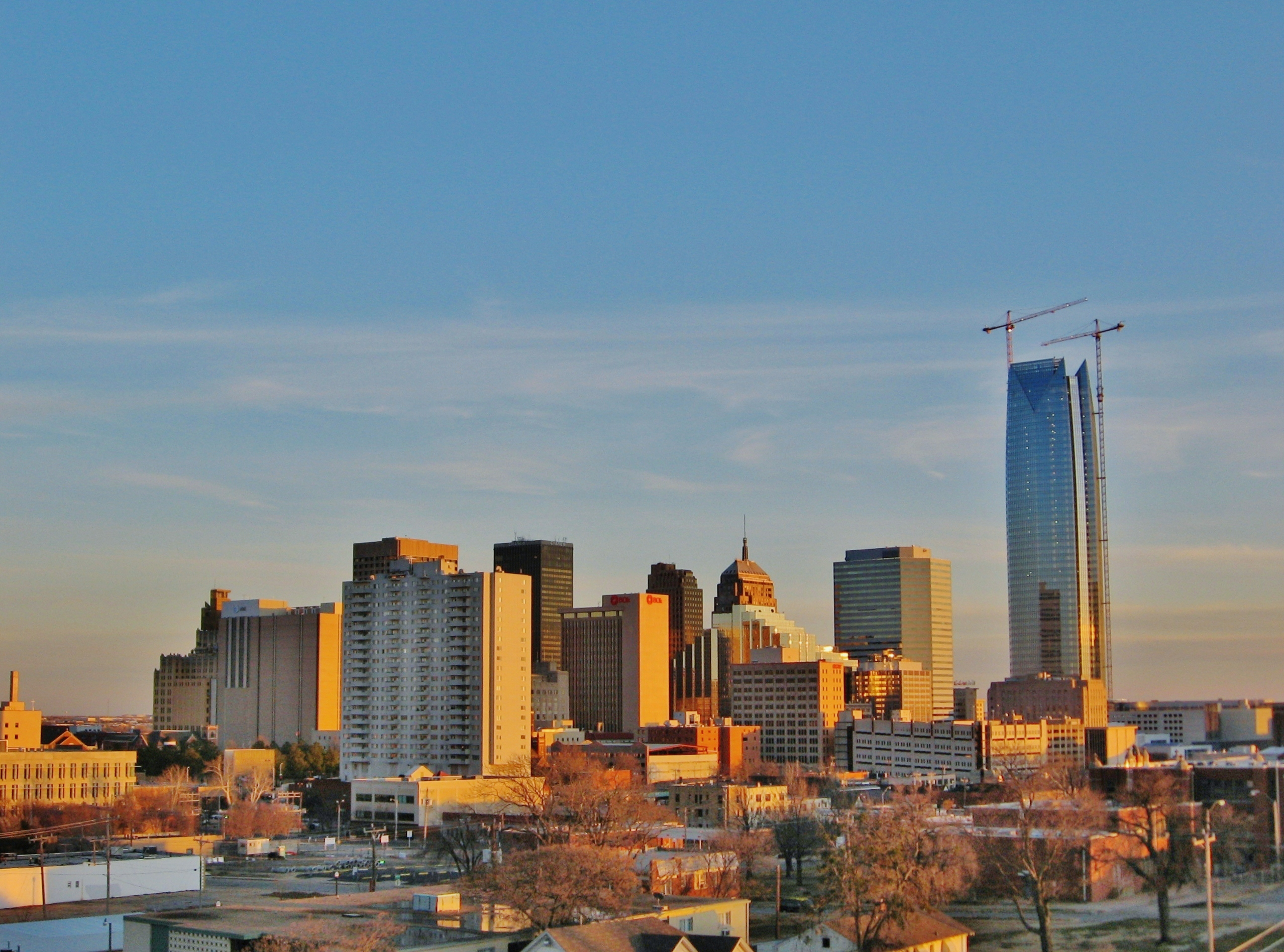
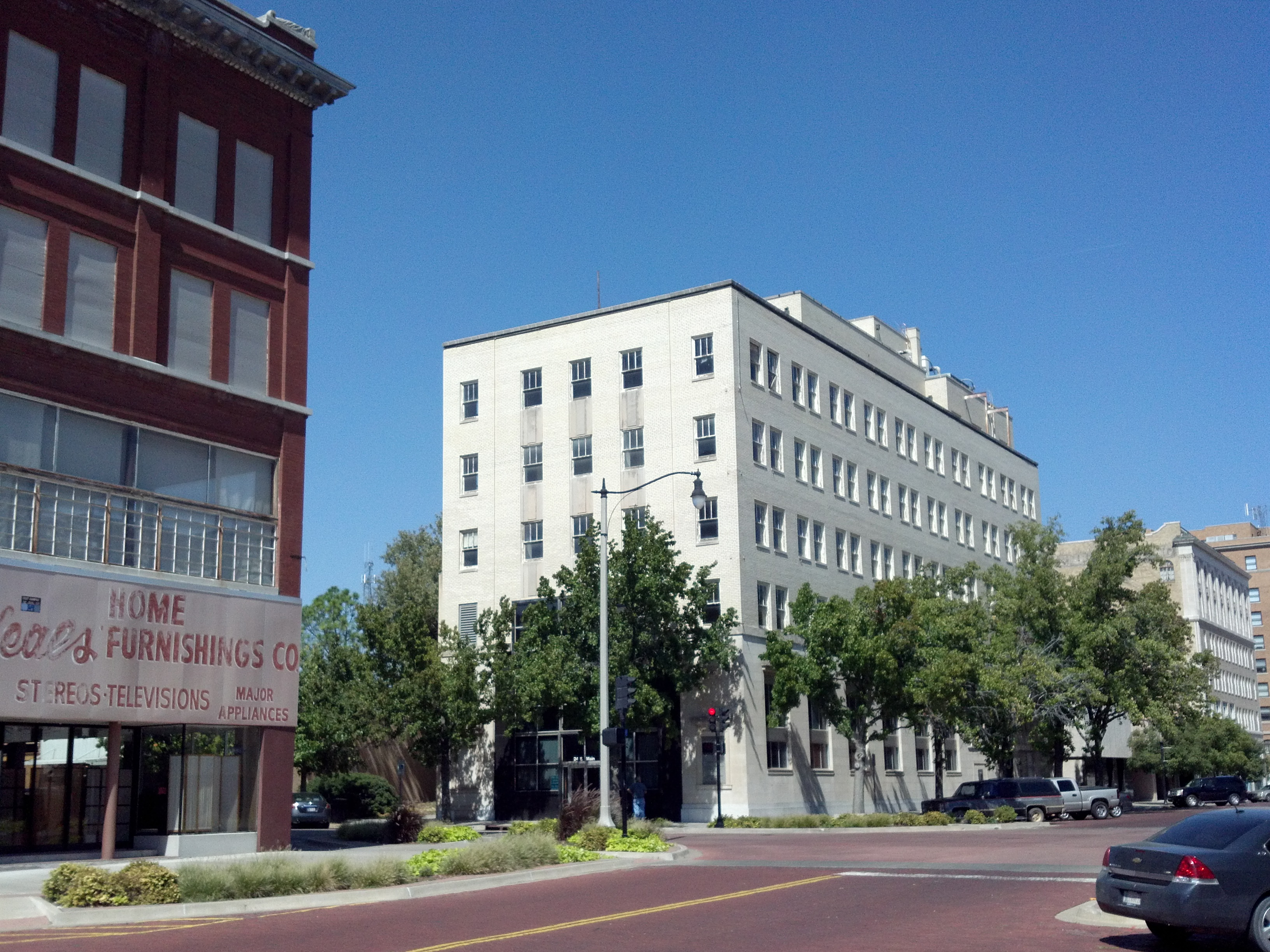
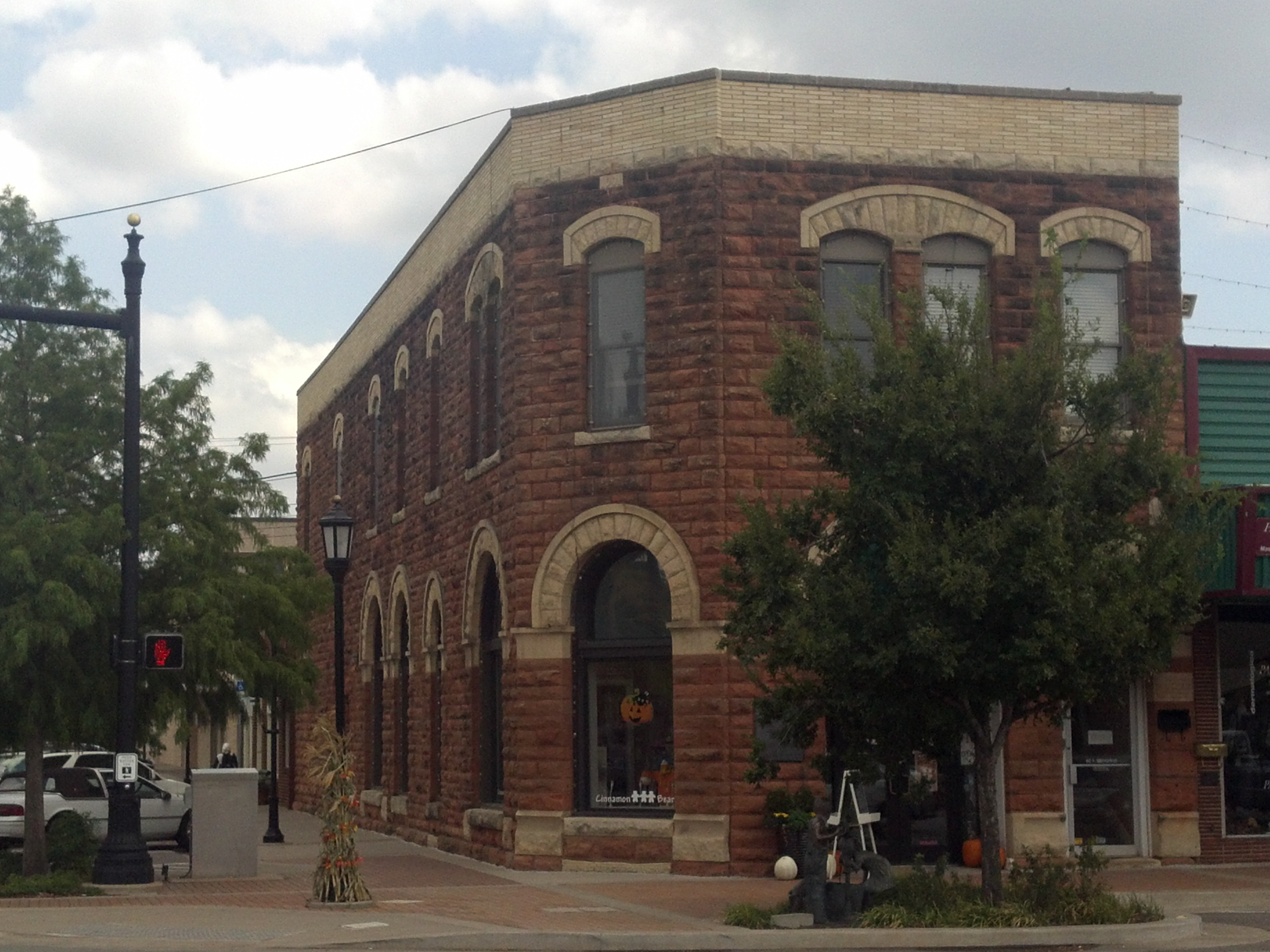
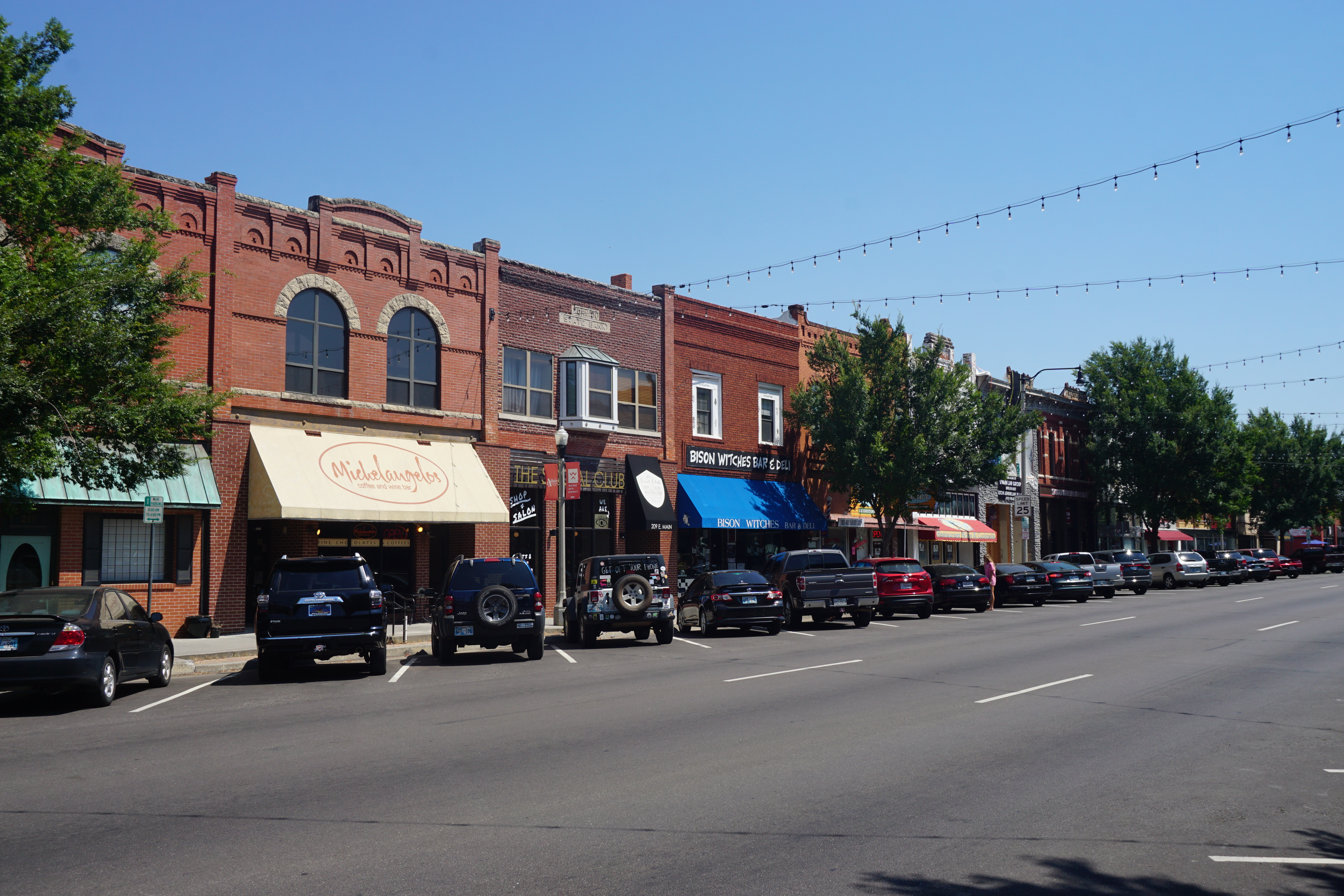
- Top: Left to Right, Downtown Oklahoma City, Bell Street Historic District of Shawnee, Downtown Edmond, Downtown Norman
Interactive Map of Oklahoma City–
Shawnee, OK CSA
Oklahoma City
Oklahoma City, OK MSA
Shawnee, OK µSA
- Coordinates: 35°30′N 97°30′W
- Country: United States
- State: Oklahoma
- Principal City: Oklahoma City
- Secondary Cities: Norman; Edmond; Moore; Midwest City; Shawnee

Area
  - Total: 6,359 sq mi (16,470 km^{2})

Population (2020 Census)
  - Total: 1,425,695
  - Rank: 41st in the U.S.
  - Density: 221/sq mi (85.3/km^{2})
  - CSA Population: 1,498,693
  - CSA rank: 39th in the U.S.

GDP
  - Total: $100.054 billion (2023)
  - Per capita: $70,179 (2023)
- Time zone: UTC-6 (CST)
  - Summer (DST): UTC-5 (CDT)
- Area codes: 405, 572

The Oklahoma City metropolitan area is an urban region in Central Oklahoma. It is the largest metropolitan area in the state of Oklahoma and contains the state capital and principal city, Oklahoma City. It is often known as the Oklahoma City Metro (sometimes shortened to simply "the Metro"), or Greater Oklahoma City in addition to the nicknames Oklahoma City itself is known for, such as OKC or "the 405".

Counties in the Oklahoma City metropolitan area include Canadian, Cleveland, Grady, Lincoln, Logan, McClain, and Oklahoma. According to the 2020 U.S. census, the metropolitan region had a population of 1,425,695, up from 1,083,346 at the 2000 census.

The Micropolitan Statistical Area of Shawnee (in Pottawatomie County) is included in Oklahoma City's Combined Statistical Area (CSA) which brings the area population to 1,498,693.

== Communities ==
The following are cities and towns in the Oklahoma City, OK Metropolitan Statistical Area categorized based on the United States Census Bureau 2025 population estimates. No population estimates are released for census-designated places (CDPs), which are marked with an asterisk (*). These places are categorized based on their 2020 Census population.

Principal City

- Oklahoma City (partial) (Note: Oklahoma City lies in four counties – Canadian, Cleveland, Oklahoma, and Pottawatomie. Most of the city is in Oklahoma County with portions extending into the neighboring counties. The portion of Oklahoma City in Pottawatomie County is part of the Shawnee, OK Micropolitan Statistical Area, while the Canadian, Cleveland, and Oklahoma County portions are part of the Oklahoma City, OK Metropolitan Statistical Area.) (719,849)

Places with 100,000 to 200,000 inhabitants

- Norman (130,943)
- Edmond (100,479)

Places with 50,000 to 99,999 inhabitants

- Moore (63,609)
- Midwest City (58,799)

Places with 10,000 to 49,999 inhabitants

- Yukon (27,615)
- Mustang (24,571)
- Del City (21,138)
- El Reno (20,730)
- Bethany (20,315)
- Chickasha (17,313)
- Newcastle (15,198)
- Choctaw (12,549)
- Guthrie (12,257)
- Warr Acres (10,552)
- Blanchard (10,013)

Places with 1,000 to 9,999 inhabitants

- Piedmont (partial) (9,427)
- The Village (9,276)
- Tuttle (8,708)
- Noble (7,748)
- Harrah (7,212)
- Purcell (7,030)
- Slaughterville (4,332)
- Nichols Hills (3,864)
- Spencer (3,857)
- Goldsby (3,591)
- Jones (3,222)
- Chandler (2,963)
- Stroud (partial) (2,913)
- Prague (partial) (2,427)
- Nicoma Park (2,294)
- Union City (2,129)
- Lexington (2,046)
- Langston (1,787)
- Luther (1,694)
- Minco (1,580)
- Crescent (1,429)
- Okarche (partial) (1,196)
- Maysville (partial) (1,096)
- Forest Park (1,035)
- Meeker (1,031)
- Rush Springs (1,020)

Places with fewer than 1,000 inhabitants

- Dibble (992)
- Geary (partial) (983)
- Cashion (partial) (971)
- Davenport (861)
- Ninnekah (833)
- Washington (780)
- Wellston (727)
- Wayne (690)
- Cole (669)
- Valley Brook (636)
- Carney (575)
- Calumet (524)
- Verden (521)
- Alex (513)
- Amber (466)
- Cedar Valley (440)
- Cedar Lake* (404)
- Tryon (404)
- Coyle (342)
- Agra (330)
- Bridge Creek (316)
- Mulhall (partial) (244)
- Marshall (233)
- Byars (209)
- Pocasset (196)
- Arcadia (187)
- Crescent Springs* (184)
- Warwick (180)
- Twin Lakes* (178)
- Cimarron City (162)
- Etowah (162)
- Woodlawn Park (153)
- Orlando (partial) (140)
- Norge (126)
- Sparks (120)
- Middleberg* (99)
- Kendrick (96)
- Lake Aluma (87)
- Bradley (85)
- Rosedale (68)
- Smith Village (52)
- Lovell* (28)
- Seward* (26)
- Fallis (20)
- Meridian (17)

== Demographics ==
Historical population
Census	Pop.	Note	%±
1900	25,915		—
1910	85,232		228.9%
1920	116,307		36.5%
1930	221,738		90.6%
1940	244,159		10.1%
1950	325,352		33.3%
1960	511,833		57.3%
1970	640,889		25.2%
1980	860,969		34.3%
1990	958,839		11.4%
2000	1,083,346		13.0%
2010	1,252,987		15.7%
2020	1,425,695		13.8%
2025 (est.)	1,512,813		6.1%
U.S. Decennial Census

=== Metropolitan Statistical Area ===
The Oklahoma City, OK Metropolitan Statistical Area includes seven counties in Oklahoma.

County	Seat	2025 estimate	2020 census	Change	Area	Density
Oklahoma	Oklahoma City	822,125	796,292	+3.24%	718 sq mi (1,860 km^{2})	1,145/sq mi (442/km^{2})
Cleveland	Norman	303,973	295,528	+2.86%	558 sq mi (1,450 km^{2})	545/sq mi (210/km^{2})
Canadian	El Reno	187,189	154,405	+21.23%	906 sq mi (2,350 km^{2})	207/sq mi (80/km^{2})
Grady	Chickasha	59,128	54,795	+7.91%	1,105 sq mi (2,860 km^{2})	54/sq mi (21/km^{2})
Logan	Guthrie	55,473	49,555	+11.94%	749 sq mi (1,940 km^{2})	74/sq mi (29/km^{2})
McClain	Purcell	49,647	41,662	+19.17%	580 sq mi (1,500 km^{2})	86/sq mi (33/km^{2})
Lincoln	Chandler	35,278	33,458	+5.44%	966 sq mi (2,500 km^{2})	37/sq mi (14/km^{2})
Total		1,512,813	1,425,695	+6.11%	5,582 sq mi (14,460 km^{2})	271/sq mi (105/km^{2})

=== Combined Statistical Area ===
The Oklahoma City–Shawnee, OK Combined Statistical Area is made up of eight counties in Oklahoma. The statistical area includes the Oklahoma City, OK Metropolitan Statistical Area and the Shawnee, OK Micropolitan Statistical Area.

Statistical Area	2025 Estimate	2020 Census	Change	Area	Density
Oklahoma City, OK Metropolitan Statistical Area	1,512,813	1,425,695	+6.11%	5,582 sq mi (14,460 km^{2})	271/sq mi (105/km^{2})
Shawnee, OK Micropolitan Statistical Area	75,102	72,454	+3.65%	793 sq mi (2,050 km^{2})	95/sq mi (37/km^{2})
Total	1,587,915	1,498,149	+5.99%	6,375 sq mi (16,510 km^{2})	249/sq mi (96/km^{2})

The Oklahoma City metropolitan area, being the state's principal and largest metropolitan statistical area, had a population of 1,425,695 at the 2020 census, up from 1,252,987 in 2010; the 2021 American Community Survey estimated its population increased to 1,441,647. With a 2021 median age of 36.1, the sex ratio was 51% female and 49% male.

According to the U.S. Census Bureau in 2010, its racial and ethnic makeup was 67.4% non-Hispanic white, 10.4% African American, 4.1% Native American, 2.8% Asian, 0.1% Pacific Islander, 5.5% from other races or ethnicities, 5.2% multiracial, and 11.3% Hispanic or Latino of any race. During the 2021 American Community Survey, its racial and ethnic makeup was 62% white, 10% African American, 3% Native American, 3% Asian, 1% other, 8% multiracial, and 14% Hispanic or Latino of any race.

In 2021, there were an estimated 565,309 households with an average of 2.5 persons per household; among them, 61% were married-couples and 18% were non-family households. Approximately 51% of its population was married. Of its 615,726 housing units at the census estimates, 92% were occupied and 64% were owner-occupied. An estimated 32% of its housing units were constructed since 2017, reflecting the metropolitan population growth. There was a median owner-occupied value of $190,800 and 36% of its units ranged from $100–200,000, while 17% were valued at under $100,000.

As of 2016, the U.S. Census Bureau estimated the median household income in the MSA was $55,065, and the median family income was $68,797. The per capita income for the MSA in 2015 was $27,316. For the population age 25 years and over, 88.4% was a high school graduate for higher, and 29.8% had a bachelor's degree or higher. By the 2021 ACS census estimates, its median household income increased to $61,815; 40% of the population made under $50,000 while 32% made from $50–100,000 annually. The metropolis had a per capita income of $32,703. Among the population economically, 14.5% of its population lived at or below the poverty line. According to Forbes, its cost of living was 6% below the national average.

Religiously and spiritually, the Association of Religion Data Archives in 2020 reported that the Southern Baptist Convention was the metropolitan area's largest Christian tradition with 213,008 members, Christianity being the area's predominant religion. Non/interdenominational Protestants were the second largest tradition with 195,158 members. The Roman Catholic Church claimed 142,491 adherents throughout the metropolitan region and Pentecostals within the Assemblies of God USA numbered 48,470. The remainder of Christians in the area held to predominantly Evangelical Christian beliefs in numerous evangelical Protestant denominations. Outside of Christendom, there were 4,230 practitioners of Hinduism and 2,078 Mahayana Buddhists. An estimated 8,904 residents practiced Islam during this study, making it the second-largest religion in the area.

== Economy ==
The metropolitan region has, since the 21st century, grown into a diversified economy. Its diverse economy has been primarily stimulated by oil and natural gas, fast food, retail, banking, telecommunications, and technology companies. Notable companies with a large presence in the area include,

- Expand Energy (Headquarters)
- Devon Energy (Former Headquarters)
- Continental Resources (Headquarters)
- Paycom (Headquarters)
- Sonic (Former Headquarters)
- Taco Mayo (Headquarters)
- Hobby Lobby (Headquarters)
- Boeing (Regional Headquarters)

== Education ==
Notable colleges and universities in the Oklahoma City metro include,

- University of Oklahoma
- University of Central Oklahoma
- Oklahoma State University–Oklahoma City
- Langston University
- Oklahoma Baptist University
- Oklahoma Christian University
- Oklahoma City University
- Southern Nazarene University

== Sports ==
Team	Sport	League	Stadium
Oklahoma City Thunder	Basketball	National Basketball Association	Paycom Center
Oklahoma City Blue	Basketball	NBA G League	Paycom Center
Oklahoma City Comets	Baseball	Pacific Coast League	Chickasaw Bricktown Ballpark
Oklahoma City Energy	Men's soccer	USL Championship (Division 2)	Taft Stadium
Oklahoma City Football Club	Women's soccer	Women's Premier Soccer League	Stars Field

== Transportation ==
=== Major airports ===
- OKC Will Rogers International Airport (passenger and cargo)
- Tinker Air Force Base (military)
- University of Oklahoma Westheimer Airport (general, university)
- Wiley Post Airport (general)

=== Major highways ===
- I-35
- I-40
- I-44
- I-235
- I-240
- US 62
- US 77
- US 277
- SH-3
- SH-4
- SH-9
- SH-37
- SH-74
- SH-152

=== Mass transit ===
- Citylink Edmond, local Edmond and Commuter Bus to downtown Oklahoma City
- Heritage Express Trolley, connects Heritage Park with downtown El Reno
- EMBARK, state's largest transit agency; bus and trolley service throughout Oklahoma County and, as of August 2019, for Norman
- Oklahoma City Streetcar, tram service within the city of Oklahoma City (primarily downtown)
- Oklahoma City Regional Transit District, planned commuter rail and expanded metropolitan bus service

==== Campus mass transportation ====
- CART, campus service for the University of Oklahoma
