= Brickopolis =

Entertainment venue in Oklahoma City, Oklahoma, U.S.

Coordinates: 35°27′54″N 97°30′33″W

Brickopolis Entertainment
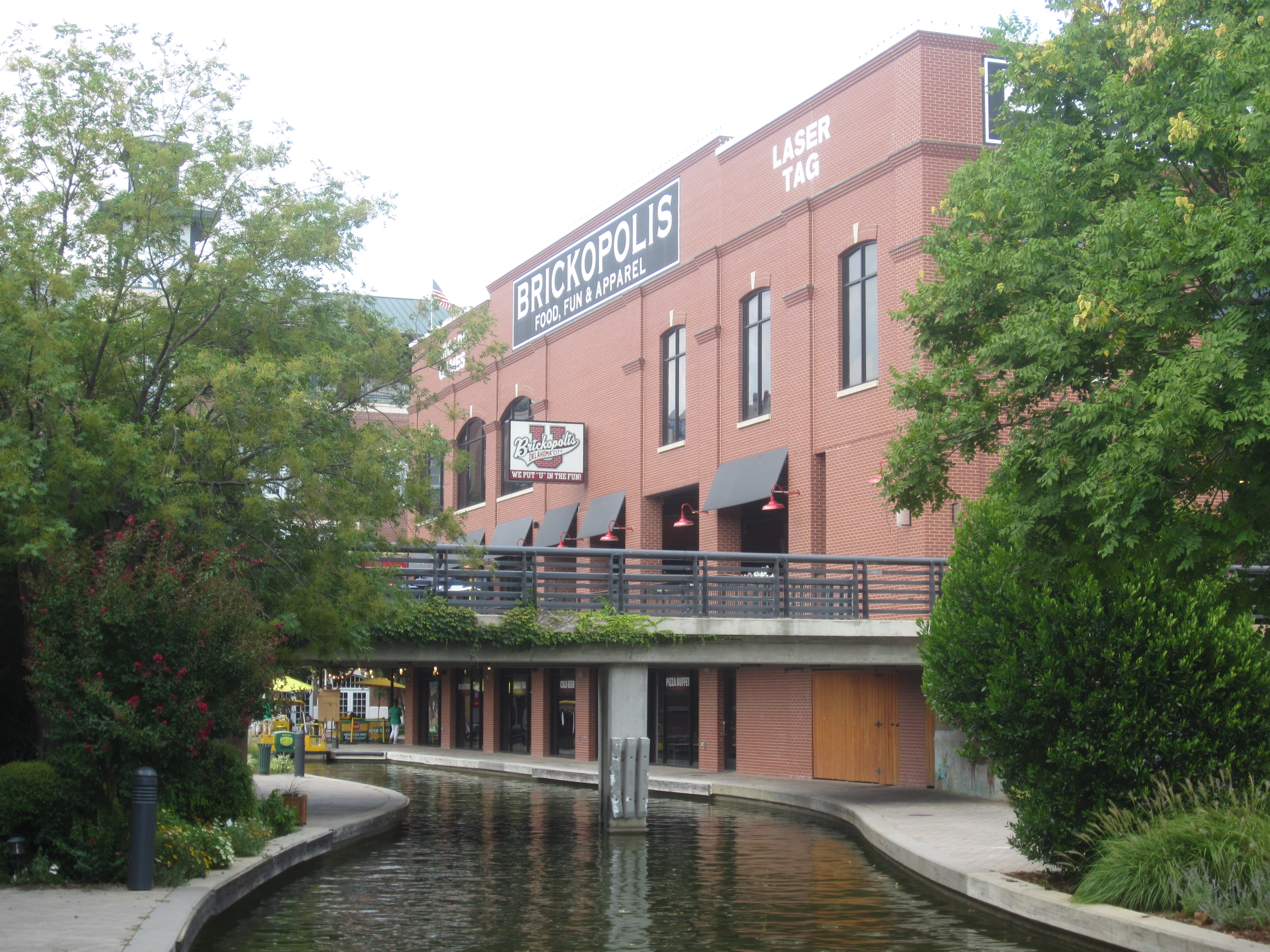
- The venue's exterior along the Bricktown Canal in 2019
- Industry: Entertainment
- Founder: Chris Johnson
- Headquarters: Bricktown, Oklahoma City, Oklahoma, United States
- Number of locations: 1 (2019)
- Area served: Oklahoma City metropolitan area

Brickopolis is a three-story entertainment venue in Bricktown, Oklahoma City, in the U.S. state of Oklahoma. Features include an arcade, laser tag, and an 18-hole miniature golf course. Brickopolis was opened by owner Chris Johnson in 2015.

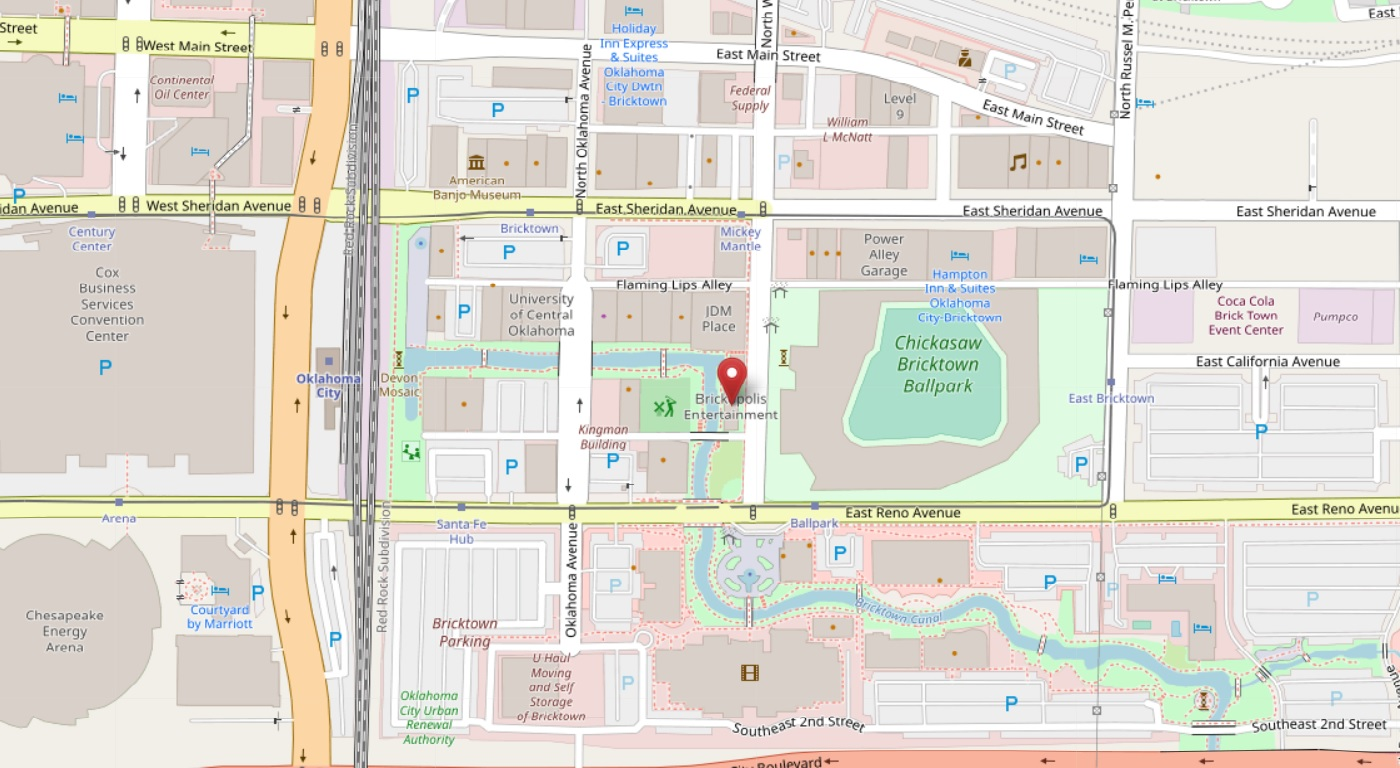
Location in Oklahoma City
