= Lucille Mulhall =

American cowgirl (1885–1940)

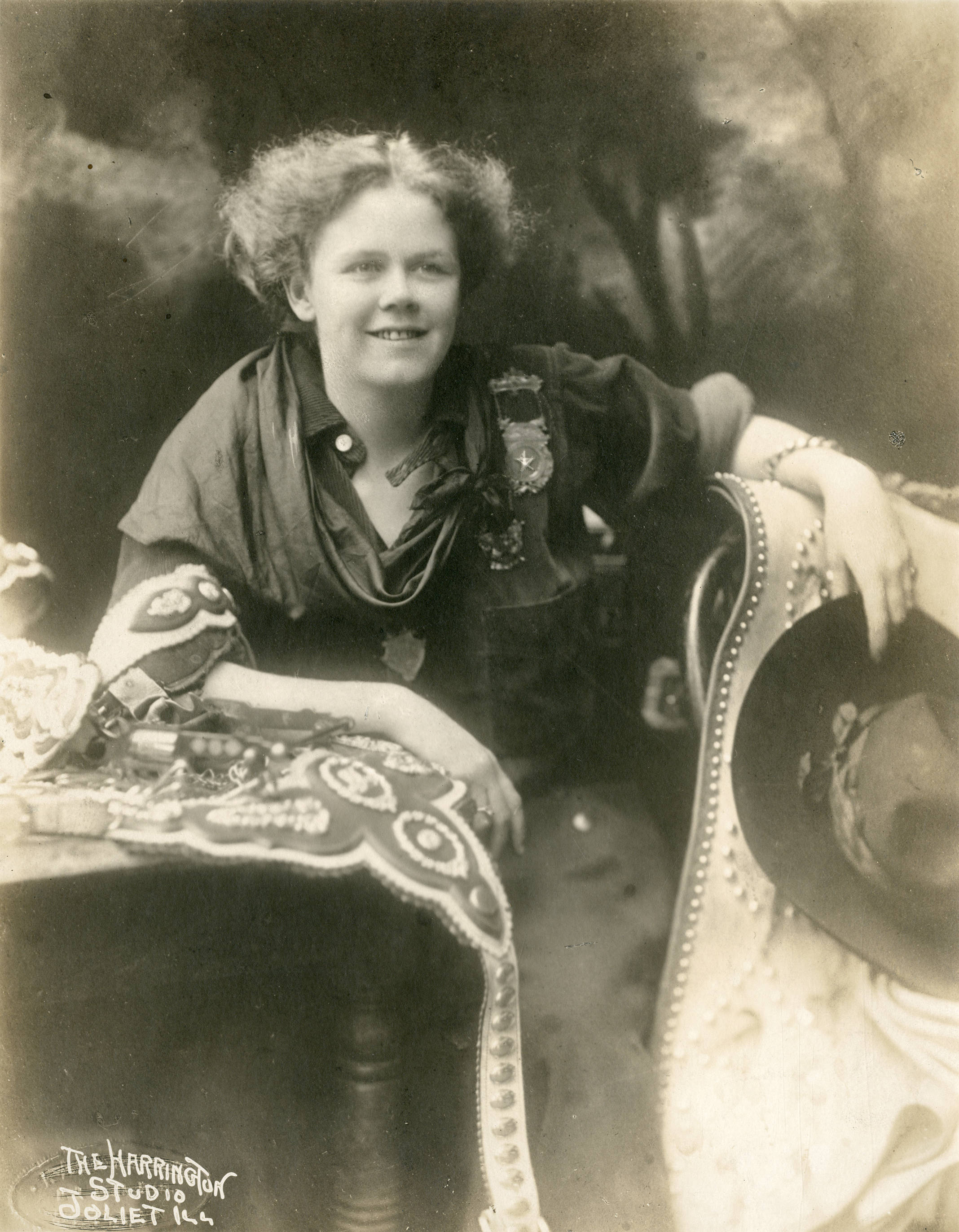
- Mulhall circa 1914
- Born: October 21, 1885; St. Louis, Missouri, U.S.
- Died: December 21, 1940 (aged 55); Logan County, Oklahoma, U.S.
- Occupation: Cowgirl

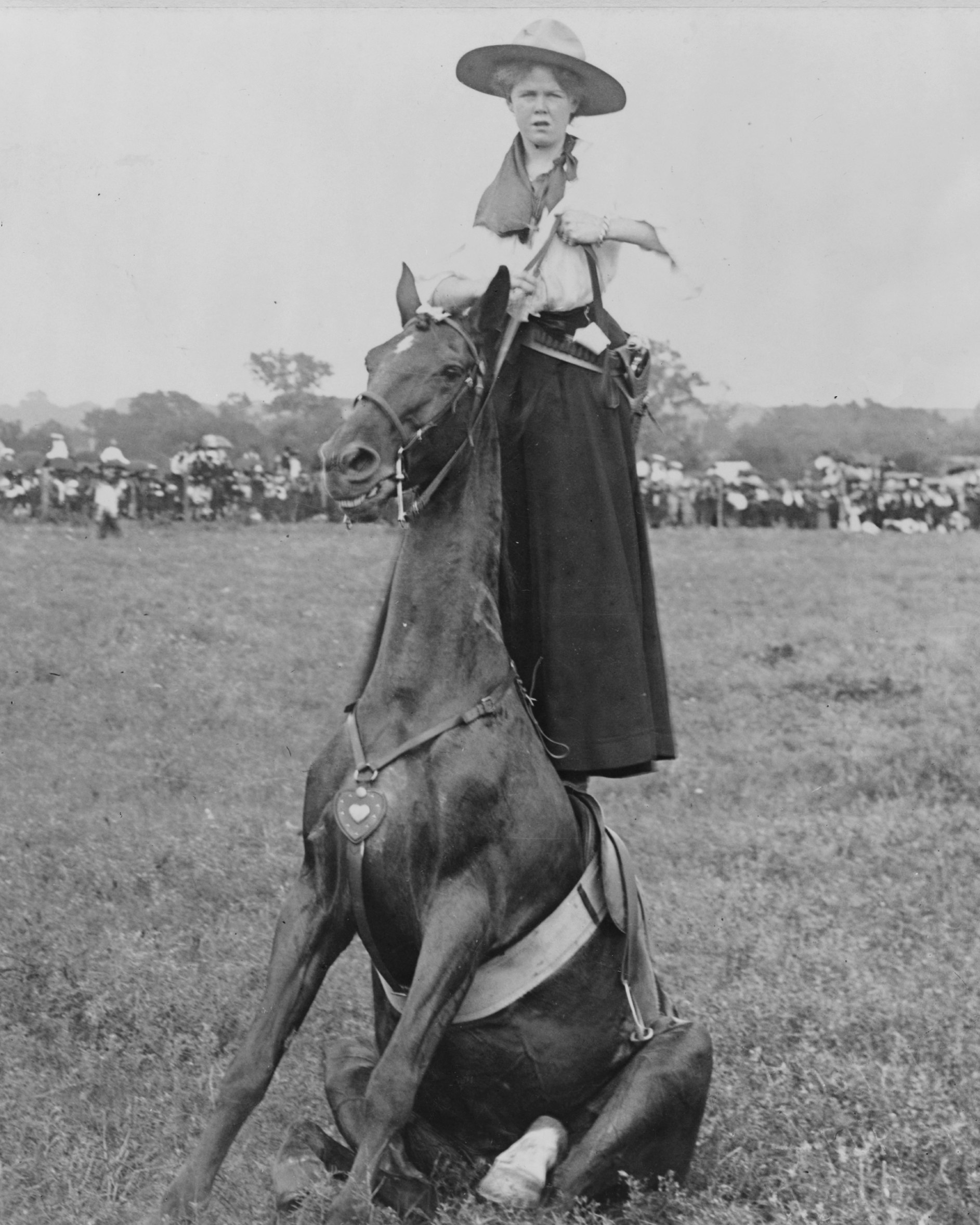
Mulhall performing c. 1909

Lucille Mulhall (October 21, 1885 – December 21, 1940) was a well-known cowgirl and Wild West performer.

== Biography ==
Mulhall was born in St. Louis, Missouri to Col. Zach Mulhall and Agnes Mulhall. Her parents brought her to the Oklahoma Territory in 1889. She was raised on her family's Mulhall Ranch in Oklahoma Territory, near what is now Mulhall, Oklahoma.

Mulhall was known as one of the first women to compete with men in roping and riding events. She was called "Rodeo Queen," "Queen of the Western Prairie," and "Queen of the Saddle," among many other appellations. She began performing in her father's rodeo show, the Mulhall Wild West Show, in 1899. Alongside other acts from her father's show, she performed at President William McKinley's inauguration ceremony in 1901. In 1903, she set the world record for steer roping after roping a steer in thirty seconds in Dennison, Texas.

She starred in the Miller Brothers' 101 Ranch Wild West Show, formed her own troupe in 1913 and performed in many rodeo and Wild West shows throughout her career. She produced her own rodeo in 1916. She retired to her family's ranch in Mulhall around 1922.

Mulhall died in Logan County, Oklahoma, in an automobile accident less than a mile from the Mulhall Ranch.

== Legacy ==
The National Cowboy and Western Heritage Museum entered Mulhall to the Rodeo Hall of Fame in 1975, and into the National Cowgirl Museum and Hall of Fame in 1977.
