= Mulhall United Methodist Church =

Historic church in Oklahoma, United States

- U.S. National Register of Historic Places
- Location within Oklahoma Location within the United States
- Location: Bryant and Craig Sts., Mulhall, Oklahoma
- Coordinates: 36°3′48″N 97°24′13″W
- Area: less than one acre
- Built: 1894
- Architectural style: Late Gothic Revival
- NRHP reference No.: 84003145
- Added to NRHP: June 22, 1984

Mulhall United Methodist Church is a historic church at Bryant and Craig Streets in Mulhall, Oklahoma. It was built in 1894 and added to the National Register in 1984.

It was deemed notable as "the oldest church building still intact in north central Oklahoma having been constructed during the Oklahoma Territorial year of 1894 and continuous religious services have been held in it for almost 95 years", and because "it is the oldest and best remaining example of Gothic Revival architecture as applied to a church in north central Oklahoma".

It is a one-and-a-half-story building, 38 by 51 feet (12 m × 16 m) in plan.
