= Cedar Valley, Oklahoma =

Cedar Valley is a town in Logan County, Oklahoma, United States. The population was 405 as of the 2020 United States census, up about 40.6% from the 288 reported at the 2010 census, and up nearly seven times the figure of 58 reported in 2000. It is part of the Oklahoma City Metropolitan Statistical Area. It is primarily a bedroom community, since more than 90 percent of the employed inhabitants commute to work in other towns. The main attraction is Cedar Valley Golf Club, which is by far the largest business in town.

== History ==
Golf course developer Duffy Martin constructed the Cedar Valley Golf Club during 1973–4 in rural Logan County, near Cedar Creek, an unincorporated place with 61 residents in 1960. Several residences were also built on the property, and the new community had an estimated population of 33 by 1980. Residents voted to incorporate Cedar Valley in July 1982. Two additional golf courses opened in the early 1980s. Cimarron National Golf Club opened in August 1992 and Aqua Canyon opened in 1994. The town population was 61 in the 1990 census, 58 in 2000 and 288 in 2010.

== Geography ==
Cedar Valley is 8 miles (13 km) west of Guthrie and one mile south of the Cimarron River.

According to the United States Census Bureau, the city has a total area of 0.5 square miles (1.3 km^{2}), all land.

== Demographics ==
Historical population
Census	Pop.	Note	%±
1990	61		—
2000	58		−4.9%
2010	288		396.6%
2020	405		40.6%
U.S. Decennial Census

=== 2020 census ===
As of the 2020 census, Cedar Valley had a population of 405. The median age was 58.5 years. 14.8% of residents were under the age of 18 and 36.5% of residents were 65 years of age or older. For every 100 females there were 86.6 males, and for every 100 females age 18 and over there were 94.9 males age 18 and over.

<0.1% of residents lived in urban areas, while 100.0% lived in rural areas.

There were 172 households in Cedar Valley, of which 20.3% had children under the age of 18 living in them. Of all households, 75.0% were married-couple households, 7.6% were households with a male householder and no spouse or partner present, and 15.1% were households with a female householder and no spouse or partner present. About 11.7% of all households were made up of individuals and 8.1% had someone living alone who was 65 years of age or older.

There were 185 housing units, of which 7.0% were vacant. Among occupied housing units, 96.5% were owner-occupied and 3.5% were renter-occupied. The homeowner vacancy rate was 1.7% and the rental vacancy rate was <0.1%.

Racial composition as of the 2020 census
Race	Percent
White	79.5%
Black or African American	1.0%
American Indian and Alaska Native	5.4%
Asian	0.2%
Native Hawaiian and Other Pacific Islander	<0.1%
Some other race	3.5%
Two or more races	10.4%
Hispanic or Latino (of any race)	7.4%

=== 2000 census ===
As of the census of 2000, there were 58 people, 28 households, and 19 families residing in the city. The population density was 117.2 inhabitants per square mile (45.3/km^{2}). There were 30 housing units at an average density of 60.6 per square mile (23.4/km^{2}). The racial makeup of the city was 87.93% White, 5.17% Native American, 1.72% from other races, and 5.17% from two or more races. Hispanic or Latino of any race were 3.45% of the population.

There were 28 households, out of which 21.4% had children under the age of 18 living with them, 60.7% were married couples living together, 7.1% had a female householder with no husband present, and 32.1% were non-families. 28.6% of all households were made up of individuals, and 17.9% had someone living alone who was 65 years of age or older. The average household size was 2.07 and the average family size was 2.53.

In the city, the population was spread out, with 15.5% under the age of 18, 1.7% from 18 to 24, 17.2% from 25 to 44, 34.5% from 45 to 64, and 31.0% who were 65 years of age or older. The median age was 56 years. For every 100 females, there were 100.0 males. For every 100 females age 18 and over, there were 88.5 males.

The median income for a household in the city was $53,125, and the median income for a family was $54,375. Males had a median income of $60,833 versus $41,250 for females. The per capita income for the city was $26,766. None of the population and none of the families were below the poverty line.

== Points of interest ==
The Town of Cedar Valley is built around the privately owned Cedar Valley Golf Club and its associated housing development. The golf club has two par seventy championship courses, Augusta and International; golf is the primary business within the town limits.

Martin also developed Cimarron Golf Course, opened to the public in 1982, and Aqua Canyon, opened in 1984.
