= Meridian, Logan County, Oklahoma =

Meridian, Oklahoma
- Town
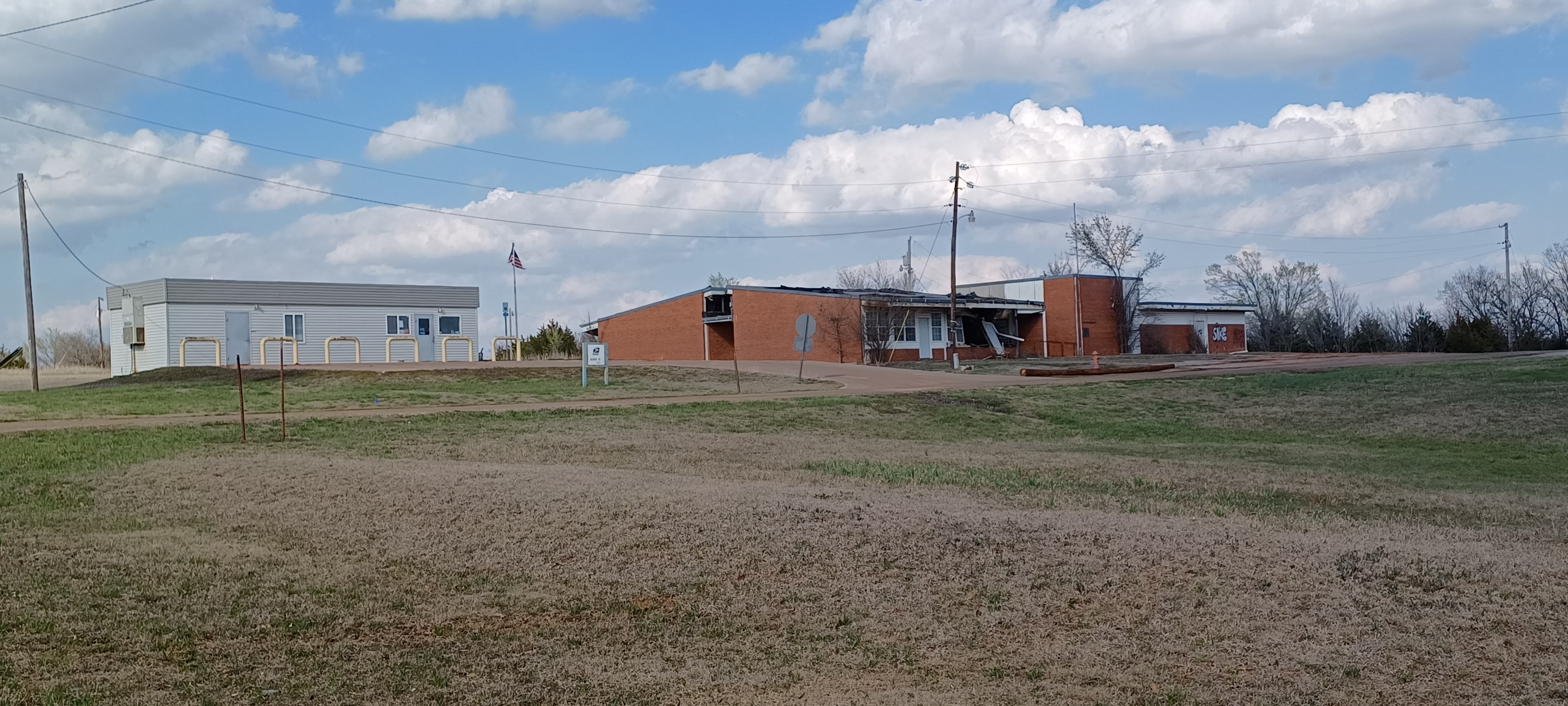
- Post office and abandoned school building in Meridian, Oklahoma

- Location within Oklahoma Location within the United States
- Coordinates: 35°50′39″N 97°14′44″W
- Country: United States
- State: Oklahoma
- County: Logan

Government
  - Mayor: Tod Hardin

Area
  - Total: 0.20 sq mi (0.52 km^{2})
  - Land: 0.20 sq mi (0.52 km^{2})
  - Water: 0 sq mi (0.00 km^{2})
- Elevation: 1,034 ft (315 m)

Population (2023)
  - Total: 8
  - Density: 70.3/sq mi (27.15/km^{2})
- Time zone: UTC-6 (Central (CST))
  - Summer (DST): UTC-5 (CST)
- FIPS code: 40-47800
- GNIS feature ID: 2412984

Meridian is a town in eastern Logan County, Oklahoma, United States. The population was 38 at the 2010 census, a decline of 29.5 percent from the figure of 54 in 2000. It is part of the Oklahoma City Metropolitan Statistical Area. The community name was chosen because of its location on the Indian meridian.

== History ==
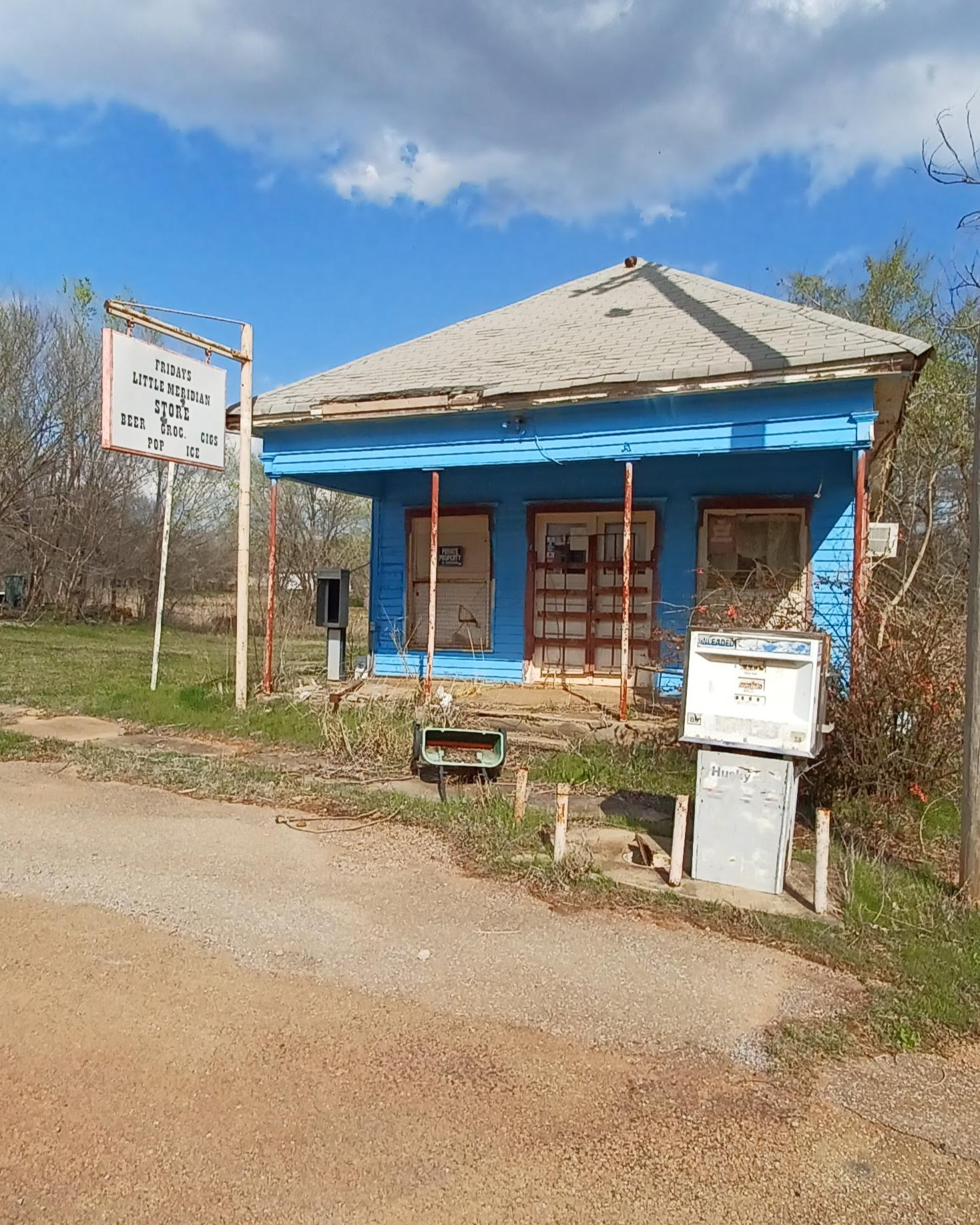
Abandoned gas station in Meridian, Oklahoma.

Non-Indians settled in this community in two stages. The west side at the time of the Land Run of 1889, and the east side when the Iowa, Sac and Fox, Kickapoo, Absentee Shawnee, and Citizen Band Potawatomi lands were opened in 1891. the Meridian Right-of-way and Townsite Company platted a town, which was incorporated in 1902. (Note: The name initially proposed for the community was Allen, to honor the new store owner, who had been elected a delegate to the Oklahoma Territorial Legislature in 1892. Allen declined the honor, and proposed the name Meridian selected instead. Allen was reelected to a second term in the Territorial Legislature. His wife, Lucy, became the first postmistress in Meridian.) Sarah Harbor opened the first store in 1893, and sold it in 1895 to Miles William Allen, a successful claimant in the 1889 Land Run. A post office opened in Harbor's store on March 10, 1894

In 1903 the Missouri, Kansas and Oklahoma Railroad (later the Missouri, Kansas and Texas Railway, Katy) built a branch line to Guthrie that passed through Meridian. Fort Smith and Western Railroad also laid track through the town. In March 1907 the Anti-Jim Crow Convention met in Meridian, where the main objective was to organize opposition to the proposed constitution for the State of Oklahoma.

== Geography ==
Meridian is 12.5 miles (20.1 km) southeast of Guthrie, the seat of Logan County.

According to the United States Census Bureau, the town has a total area of 0.2 square mile (0.5 km^{2}), all land.

== Demographics ==
Historical population
Census	Pop.	Note	%±
1910	199		—
1920	201		1.0%
1930	165		−17.9%
1940	210		27.3%
1950	187		−11.0%
1960	160		−14.4%
1970	104		−35.0%
1980	78		−25.0%
1990	45		−42.3%
2000	54		20.0%
2010	38		−29.6%
2020	14		−63.2%
U.S. Decennial Census

=== Racial and ethnic composition ===
Meridian town, Oklahoma – Racial and ethnic composition Note: the US Census treats Hispanic/Latino as an ethnic category. This table excludes Latinos from the racial categories and assigns them to a separate category. Hispanics/Latinos may be of any race.
Race / Ethnicity (NH = Non-Hispanic)	Pop 2000	Pop 2010	Pop 2020	% 2000	% 2010	% 2020
White alone (NH)	8	7	3	14.81%	18.42%	21.43%
Black or African American alone (NH)	45	29	7	83.33%	76.32%	50.00%
Native American or Alaska Native alone (NH)	0	0	0	0.00%	0.00%	0.00%
Asian alone (NH)	0	0	0	0.00%	0.00%	0.00%
Native Hawaiian or Pacific Islander alone (NH)	0	0	1	0.00%	0.00%	7.14%
Other race alone (NH)	0	0	1	0.00%	0.00%	7.14%
Mixed race or Multiracial (NH)	1	2	2	1.85%	5.26%	14.29%
Hispanic or Latino (any race)	0	0	0	0.00%	0.00%	0.00%
Total	54	38	14	100.00%	100.00%	100.00%

=== 2000 census ===
As of the census of 2000, there were 54 people, 23 households, and 14 families residing in the town. The population density was 271.5 inhabitants per square mile (104.8/km^{2}). There were 31 housing units at an average density of 155.9 per square mile (60.2/km^{2}). The racial makeup of the town was 14.81% White, 83.33% African American, and 1.85% from two or more races.

There were 23 households, out of which 17.4% had children under the age of 18 living with them, 43.5% were married couples living together, 13.0% had a female householder with no husband present, and 34.8% were non-families. 34.8% of all households were made up of individuals, and 17.4% had someone living alone who was 65 years of age or older. The average household size was 2.35 and the average family size was 3.07.

In the town, the population was spread out, with 25.9% under the age of 18, 1.9% from 18 to 24, 25.9% from 25 to 44, 20.4% from 45 to 64, and 25.9% who were 65 years of age or older. The median age was 37 years. For every 100 females, there were 125.0 males. For every 100 females age 18 and over, there were 122.2 males.

The median income for a household in the town was $25,500, and the median income for a family was $26,000. Males had a median income of $29,167 versus $25,893 for females. The per capita income for the town was $9,056. There were 28.6% of families and 25.9% of the population living below the poverty line, including 5.6% of under eighteens and 16.7% of those over 64.
