= Twin Lakes, Oklahoma =

- Census-designated place
- Location within Oklahoma Location within the United States
- Coordinates: 35°52′05″N 97°39′55″W
- Country: United States
- State: Oklahoma
- County: Logan

Area
  - Total: 0.43 sq mi (1.12 km^{2})
  - Land: 0.39 sq mi (1.02 km^{2})
  - Water: 0.039 sq mi (0.10 km^{2})
- Elevation: 965 ft (294 m)

Population (2020)
  - Total: 178
  - Density: 451.6/sq mi (174.37/km^{2})
- Time zone: UTC-6 (Central (CST))
  - Summer (DST): UTC-5 (CDT)
- ZIP Code: 73028 (Crescent)
- Area codes: 405/572
- FIPS code: 40-75575
- GNIS feature ID: 2812854

Twin Lakes is an unincorporated community and census-designated place (CDP) in Logan County, Oklahoma, United States. It was first listed as a CDP prior to the 2020 census. As of the 2020 census, Twin Lakes had a population of 178.

The CDP is on the western edge of Logan County, bordered to the west by Kingfisher County. The Cimarron River forms the southern edge of the community. It is 6 miles (10 km) southwest of Cimarron City, 17 miles (27 km) west of Guthrie, and 39 miles (63 km) by road north of downtown Oklahoma City.

== Demographics ==
Historical population
Census	Pop.	Note	%±
2020	178		—
U.S. Decennial Census

=== 2020 census ===
As of the 2020 census, Twin Lakes had a population of 178. The median age was 51.3 years. 18.0% of residents were under the age of 18 and 24.7% of residents were 65 years of age or older. For every 100 females there were 93.5 males, and for every 100 females age 18 and over there were 105.6 males age 18 and over.

0.0% of residents lived in urban areas, while 100.0% lived in rural areas.

There were 90 households in Twin Lakes, of which 11.1% had children under the age of 18 living in them. Of all households, 53.3% were married-couple households, 21.1% were households with a male householder and no spouse or partner present, and 22.2% were households with a female householder and no spouse or partner present. About 30.0% of all households were made up of individuals and 13.3% had someone living alone who was 65 years of age or older.

There were 169 housing units, of which 46.7% were vacant. The homeowner vacancy rate was 12.2% and the rental vacancy rate was 0.0%.

Racial composition as of the 2020 census
Race	Number	Percent
White	161	90.4%
Black or African American	0	0.0%
American Indian and Alaska Native	4	2.2%
Asian	2	1.1%
Native Hawaiian and Other Pacific Islander	0	0.0%
Some other race	0	0.0%
Two or more races	11	6.2%
Hispanic or Latino (of any race)	5	2.8%
