= Zona Maie Griswold =

American singer

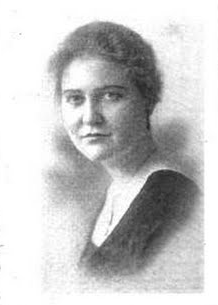
- Zona Maie Griswold, from a 1917 publication.
- Born: December 19, 1889; Mulhall, Oklahoma
- Died: November 26, 1961 (aged 71); Des Moines, Iowa
- Other names: Zona Griswold, Zona Maie Fimmen (after marriage)
- Occupations: opera singer, concert

Zona Maie Griswold (December 19, 1889 – November 26, 1961) was an American soprano singer from Texas.

== Early life and education ==
Zona Maie Griswold was born in Mulhall, Oklahoma and raised in Dallas, Texas, the daughter of John Nelson Griswold and Florence Belle Young Griswold. Her father worked as a railroad freight agent; her mother was a song composer. Zona Maie Griswold studied voice at the New England Conservatory of Music, with further training in Berlin.

== Career ==
In 1914 Griswold was one of the soloists at the Texas State Saengerfest. She also sang with the Grand Saline Band and the Apollo Chorus of Fort Worth.

During her time in New York, Griswold was soloist at Glen Ridge Congregational Church in New Jersey, and sang regularly at other churches and clubs, and often on radio in the 1920s. "Her limpid, clear, vibrant tone quality, her excellent musicianship, and her serious devotion to artistic ideals have gained for her a widespread demand to sing more songs more frequently," according to a 1924 report.

She appeared (as an opera singer) on Broadway in The Guardsman (1924-1925). She also taught singing in New York.

== Personal life ==
Zona Maie Griswold married businessman Edward August Fimmen in 1916. They had daughters, Zona Maie (born 1917) and Florence Lilly (born 1919). She was widowed when Edward died in 1947. She died from Parkinson's disease in 1961, aged 71, while living with her daughter in Des Moines, Iowa. She was buried in Dallas.
