= Crescent Springs, Oklahoma =

- Census-designated place
- Location within Oklahoma Location within the United States
- Coordinates: 35°53′48″N 97°36′10″W
- Country: United States
- State: Oklahoma
- County: Logan

Area
  - Total: 0.39 sq mi (1.00 km^{2})
  - Land: 0.36 sq mi (0.93 km^{2})
  - Water: 0.027 sq mi (0.07 km^{2})
- Elevation: 1,017 ft (310 m)

Population (2020)
  - Total: 184
  - Density: 509.9/sq mi (196.89/km^{2})
- Time zone: UTC-6 (Central (CST))
  - Summer (DST): UTC-5 (CDT)
- ZIP Code: 73028 (Crescent)
- Area codes: 405/572
- FIPS code: 40-18275
- GNIS feature ID: 2812853

Crescent Springs is an unincorporated community and census-designated place (CDP) in Logan County, Oklahoma, United States. It was first listed as a CDP prior to the 2020 census. As of the 2020 census, Crescent Springs had a population of 184.

The CDP is in western Logan County, bordered to the south by Cimarron City. Oklahoma State Highway 74 forms the eastern edge of the CDP; the highway leads north 4 miles (6 km) to Crescent and south 26 miles (42 km) to the Northwest Expressway in Oklahoma City. Guthrie is 11 miles (18 km) to the east of Crescent Springs via Highways 74 and 33.

Lake Lattawanna is a reservoir in the eastern part of Crescent Springs; its outlet leads south through Cimarron City to the Cimarron River.

== Demographics ==
Historical population
Census	Pop.	Note	%±
2020	184		—
U.S. Decennial Census

=== 2020 census ===
As of the 2020 census, Crescent Springs had a population of 184. The median age was 54.0 years. 14.1% of residents were under the age of 18 and 25.5% of residents were 65 years of age or older. For every 100 females there were 106.7 males, and for every 100 females age 18 and over there were 105.2 males age 18 and over.

0.0% of residents lived in urban areas, while 100.0% lived in rural areas.

There were 86 households in Crescent Springs, of which 14.0% had children under the age of 18 living in them. Of all households, 36.0% were married-couple households, 40.7% were households with a male householder and no spouse or partner present, and 20.9% were households with a female householder and no spouse or partner present. About 51.2% of all households were made up of individuals and 25.6% had someone living alone who was 65 years of age or older.

There were 106 housing units, of which 18.9% were vacant. The homeowner vacancy rate was 0.0% and the rental vacancy rate was 42.9%.

Racial composition as of the 2020 census
Race	Number	Percent
White	148	80.4%
Black or African American	1	0.5%
American Indian and Alaska Native	7	3.8%
Asian	3	1.6%
Native Hawaiian and Other Pacific Islander	0	0.0%
Some other race	0	0.0%
Two or more races	25	13.6%
Hispanic or Latino (of any race)	9	4.9%
