= Coyle, Oklahoma =

- Town
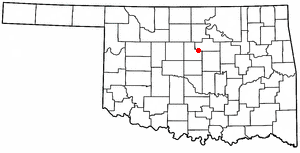
- Location of Coyle, Oklahoma
- Coordinates: 35°57′07″N 97°14′10″W
- Country: United States
- State: Oklahoma
- County: Logan

Area
  - Total: 0.78 sq mi (2.03 km^{2})
  - Land: 0.78 sq mi (2.03 km^{2})
  - Water: 0 sq mi (0.00 km^{2})
- Elevation: 919 ft (280 m)

Population (2020)
  - Total: 350
  - Density: 446.0/sq mi (172.19/km^{2})
- Time zone: UTC-6 (Central (CST))
  - Summer (DST): UTC-5 (CDT)
- ZIP code: 73027
- Area codes: 405/572
- FIPS code: 40-17950
- GNIS feature ID: 2412381
- Website: townofcoyle.myruralwater.com

Coyle is a town in Logan County, Oklahoma, United States. As of the 2020 census, Coyle had a population of 350. It is part of the Oklahoma City metropolitan area. The town was named for William Coyle, an influential Guthrie business man.

Founded in Oklahoma Territory before statehood, Coyle initially prospered as an agricultural town and because of the arrival of the railroad. However, the demand for the area's principal crop, cotton, declined sharply after World War I. Rail service ended during the 1950s. By 2000, it was estimated that 95 percent of the employed residents commuted to work in larger towns nearby.

== History ==
Free Museum in Coyle, Oklahoma

Coyle began as an agricultural community in 1899 when the Eastern Oklahoma Railway, a subsidiary of the Atchison, Topeka & Santa Fe Railway built a branch line from Guthrie to Cushing. William H. Coyle, a Guthrie entrepreneur, and U. C. Guss were employed as purchasing agents by the railroad company to acquire right of way, and were awarded an opportunity to select a townsite as a bonus for their successful work. They chose a location 2 miles (3.2 km) south of Iowa City, a community previously established on the Cimarron River. (Note: Iowa City had been established at the time of the 1889 Land Run in Antelope Township of what would become Logan County in Oklahoma Territory.) Almost all of the Iowa City residents moved to the new location as soon as they became aware that the railroad route would bypass Iowa City. The Iowa City post office remained at the old location, while a new post office was established in the new town, which was named Coyle after its founder. The Coyle post office opened May 5, 1900. Iowa City became a ghost town even before Oklahoma Territory became part of the state of Oklahoma.

Agriculture supported the town's economy, with cotton being the main crop. Early businesses in Coyle included a bank, a blacksmith, cotton gins, a drug store, a furniture store, some general stores, a lumberyard, and a photographer. (Note: The pharmacist happened to be the father of Mildred Anderson, who later married the noted newsman and author, Bob Considine. Miss Anderson was born in Coyle in 1908.) The Cimarron Valley Clipper newspaper began publication in 1900 and continued until 1949. The town had two saloons until 1904, when temperance crusader Carrie Nation visited Coyle and held a public debate with Coyle's Superintendent of Schools, Martin E. Trapp. Immediately afterward, the city government outlawed the saloons.

After WWI, the demand for cotton declined sharply, causing many local farms to become unprofitable. The population of Coyle continued to increase, reaching a peak of 440 at the 1940 census. Railroad service ended in the late 1950s. Since then, about 95 percent of the employed residents of Coyle have commuted to work in larger towns nearby, such as Stillwater, Guthrie, and Oklahoma City.

== Geography ==
Coyle is 14 miles (23 km) northeast of Guthrie, the seat of Logan County and 1 mile (1.6 km) west of the confluence of Fitzgerald Creek and the Cimarron River. Coyle is located in North Cimarron Township of Logan County.

According to the United States Census Bureau, the town has a total area of 0.6 square miles (1.6 km^{2}), all land.

== Demographics ==
Historical population
Census	Pop.	Note	%±
1910	413		—
1920	408		−1.2%
1930	421		3.2%
1940	440		4.5%
1950	360		−18.2%
1960	292		−18.9%
1970	303		3.8%
1980	345		13.9%
1990	289		−16.2%
2000	337		16.6%
2010	325		−3.6%
2020	350		7.7%
U.S. Decennial Census

=== 2020 census ===
As of the 2020 census, Coyle had a population of 350. The median age was 32.3 years. 27.1% of residents were under the age of 18 and 10.6% of residents were 65 years of age or older. For every 100 females there were 120.1 males, and for every 100 females age 18 and over there were 133.9 males age 18 and over.

0.0% of residents lived in urban areas, while 100.0% lived in rural areas.

There were 124 households in Coyle, of which 48.4% had children under the age of 18 living in them. Of all households, 42.7% were married-couple households, 23.4% were households with a male householder and no spouse or partner present, and 26.6% were households with a female householder and no spouse or partner present. About 19.4% of all households were made up of individuals and 9.6% had someone living alone who was 65 years of age or older.

There were 164 housing units, of which 24.4% were vacant. The homeowner vacancy rate was 2.3% and the rental vacancy rate was 4.5%.

Racial composition as of the 2020 census
Race	Number	Percent
White	274	78.3%
Black or African American	18	5.1%
American Indian and Alaska Native	2	0.6%
Asian	0	0.0%
Native Hawaiian and Other Pacific Islander	2	0.6%
Some other race	7	2.0%
Two or more races	47	13.4%
Hispanic or Latino (of any race)	18	5.1%

=== 2000 census ===
As of the census of 2000, there were 337 people, 136 households, and 82 families residing in the town. The population density was 541.2 inhabitants per square mile (209.0/km^{2}). There were 154 housing units at an average density of 247.3 per square mile (95.5/km^{2}). The racial makeup of the town was 81.60% White, 10.98% African American, 5.64% Native American, 0.30% from other races, and 1.48% from two or more races. Hispanic or Latino people of any race were 0.89% of the population.

There were 136 households, out of which 38.2% had children under the age of 18 living with them, 44.9% were married couples living together, 11.0% had a female householder with no husband present, and 39.0% were non-families. 35.3% of all households were made up of individuals, and 15.4% had someone living alone who was 65 years of age or older. The average household size was 2.48 and the average family size was 3.33.

In the town, the population was spread out, with 29.7% under the age of 18, 12.5% from 18 to 24, 28.5% from 25 to 44, 19.0% from 45 to 64, and 10.4% who were 65 years of age or older. The median age was 31 years. For every 100 females, there were 105.5 males. For every 100 females age 18 and over, there were 95.9 males.

The median income for a household in the town was $23,625, and the median income for a family was $32,000. Males had a median income of $21,406 versus $18,750 for females. The per capita income for the town was $13,588. About 16.3% of families and 23.9% of the population were below the poverty line, including 32.9% of those under age 18 and 24.4% of those age 65 or over.
