= Logan County, Oklahoma =

County in Oklahoma, United States

- County
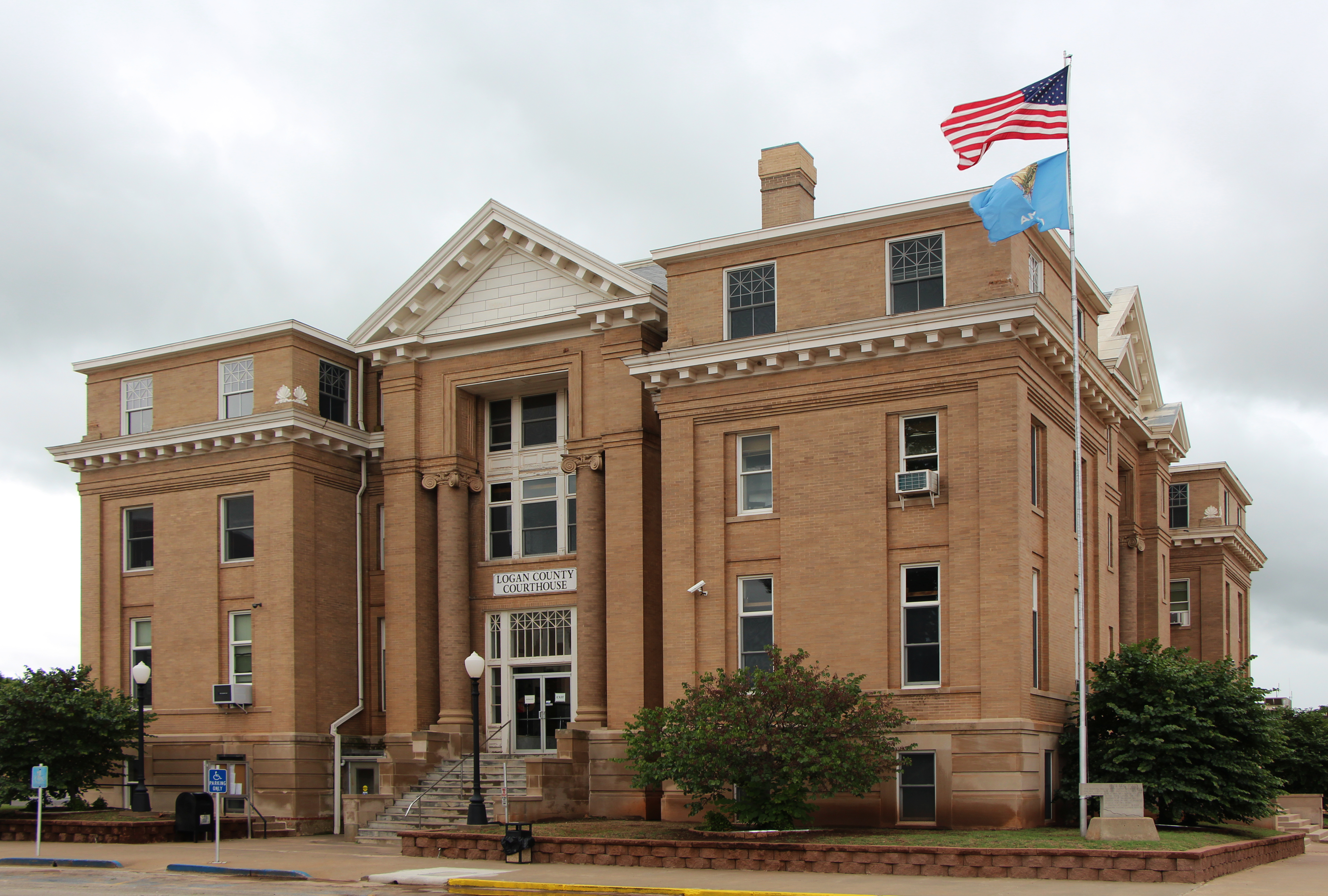
- Logan County Courthouse, Guthrie, Oklahoma

- Location within the U.S. state of Oklahoma
- Coordinates: 35°55′N 97°27′W
- Country: United States
- State: Oklahoma
- Founded: 1890
- Named for: John A. Logan
- Seat: Guthrie
- Largest city: Guthrie

Area
  - Total: 749 sq mi (1,940 km^{2})
  - Land: 744 sq mi (1,930 km^{2})
  - Water: 5.0 sq mi (13 km^{2}) 0.7%

Population (2020)
  - Total: 49,555
  - Estimate (2025): 55,473 ▲
  - Density: 66.6/sq mi (25.7/km^{2})
- Time zone: UTC−6 (Central)
  - Summer (DST): UTC−5 (CDT)
- Congressional district: 3rd
- Website: www.logancountyok.com

Logan County is a county located in the U.S. state of Oklahoma. As of the 2020 census, the population was 49,555. Its county seat is Guthrie.

Logan County is part of the Oklahoma City metropolitan area. Guthrie served as the capital of Oklahoma Territory from 1890 until 1907 and of the state of Oklahoma from 1907 until 1910.

== History ==
Following the Oklahoma Organic Act of 1890, which established the Oklahoma Territory, Logan County was designated as County One, of the six counties created out of Unassigned Lands. The town of Guthrie was designated as the county seat and the capital of Oklahoma Territory. The county was named on August 5, 1890, for U. S. Senator, John A. Logan, of Illinois.

The land in what became Logan County had been settled during the 1820s and 1830s by the Creek and Seminole tribes after the forced Indian Removal by the federal government from their traditional historic territories in the American Southeast. These tribes supported the Confederate States of America during the Civil War, in part based on the CSA promise of an American Indian state if they won. The United States required the tribes that supported the Confederacy to make new Reconstruction Treaties in 1866.

As part of the treaties, the US reduced the lands of these tribes, designating certain areas as Unassigned Lands. This 2 million-acre area was reserved for years after the war as potential reservation lands for the Plains tribes, who were mostly settled in other areas. Congress passed a law in 1889, after the Indian Wars, to open the land to non-Indian settlement under terms of the 1862 Homestead Act. The land rush (or run) took place on April 22, 1889, whereby people rushed to establish homestead plots.

The three easternmost townships were added to the county in 1891, after areas of the Sac and Fox lands were also opened to non-Indian settlement, following allotment of communal lands to individual tribal households under implementation of the Dawes Act. This law resulted in massive losses of Indian land. The US classified lands remaining after allotment as "surplus" and allowed them to be sold to non-Natives. That same year, Cora Victoria Diehl won the first election for the county register of deeds, becoming the first woman elected in Oklahoma Territory.

Before 1889, the Kansas Southern Railway (later the Atchison, Topeka and Santa Fe Railway) had built a line from the Kansas-Oklahoma border to Purcell in Indian Territory. Stations built in the present Logan County were Beaver Creek (now Mulhall, Oklahoma) and Deer Creek (now Guthrie). After the land run, Guthrie, Oklahoma developed into a center of trade for the county and region, connected by railroads to other markets.

The Denver, Enid and Gulf Railroad (later the Atchison, Topeka and Santa Fe) ran from Guthrie to Enid, Oklahoma. The Choctaw, Oklahoma and Western Railroad (later the Chicago, Rock Island and Pacific Railway) ran between Guthrie and Chandler, Oklahoma, while the Missouri, Kansas and Texas Railroad ran east from Guthrie to Fallis, Oklahoma. From 1916 to 1944, the Oklahoma Railway Company interurban line ran between Guthrie and Oklahoma City.

== Geography ==
According to the U.S. Census Bureau, the county has a total area of 749 square miles (1,940 km^{2}), of which 744 square miles (1,930 km^{2}) is land and 5.0 square miles (13 km^{2}) (0.7%) is water. The county lies in the Red Bed Plains physiographic area. It is drained by the Cimarron River and the smaller streams Cottonwood Creek and Ephraim Creek.

=== Major highways ===
- Interstate 35
- U.S. Highway 77
- State Highway 33
- State Highway 51
- State Highway 74
  - State Highway 74C
  - State Highway 74D
  - State Highway 74E
  - State Highway 74F
- State Highway 105

=== Adjacent counties ===
- Garfield County (north)
- Noble County (north)
- Payne County (northeast)
- Lincoln County (east)
- Oklahoma County (south)
- Kingfisher County (west)

== Demographics ==
Historical population
Census	Pop.	Note	%±
1900	26,563		—
1910	31,740		19.5%
1920	27,550		−13.2%
1930	27,761		0.8%
1940	25,245		−9.1%
1950	22,170		−12.2%
1960	18,662		−15.8%
1970	19,645		5.3%
1980	26,881		36.8%
1990	29,011		7.9%
2000	33,924		16.9%
2010	41,848		23.4%
2020	49,555		18.4%
2025 (est.)	55,473	▲	11.9%
U.S. Decennial Census; 1790-1960 1900-1990; 1990-2000 2010

Age pyramid for Logan County, Oklahoma, based on census 2000 data.

=== 2021 estimates ===
By 2021 census estimates, its median household income was $74,744 with a poverty rate of 13.1%.

=== 2020 census ===
As of the 2020 census, the county had a population of 49,555. Of the residents, 25.9% were under the age of 18 and 15.6% were 65 years of age or older; the median age was 38.2 years. For every 100 females there were 98.6 males, and for every 100 females age 18 and over there were 96.1 males.

The racial makeup of the county was 74.9% White, 6.6% Black or African American, 3.5% American Indian and Alaska Native, 0.6% Asian, 3.4% from some other race, and 11.0% from two or more races. Hispanic or Latino residents of any race comprised 8.1% of the population.

There were 17,565 households in the county, of which 36.3% had children under the age of 18 living with them and 20.5% had a female householder with no spouse or partner present. About 21.3% of all households were made up of individuals and 9.5% had someone living alone who was 65 years of age or older.

There were 19,307 housing units, of which 9.0% were vacant. Among occupied housing units, 79.1% were owner-occupied and 20.9% were renter-occupied. The homeowner vacancy rate was 1.6% and the rental vacancy rate was 8.6%.

=== 2000 census ===
As of the census of 2000, there were 33,924 people, 12,389 households, and 8,994 families residing in the county. The population density was 46 inhabitants per square mile (18/km^{2}). There were 13,906 housing units at an average density of 19 units per square mile (7.3/km^{2}). The racial makeup of the county was 81.6% White, 11.0% Black or African American, 2.9% Native American, 0.3% Asian, 0.1% Pacific Islander, 1.2% from other races, and 2.9% from two or more races. 2.9% of the population was Hispanic or Latino of any race.

As of 2000, there were 12,389 households, out of which 33.70% had children under the age of 18 living with them, 59.2% were married couples living together, 9.8% had a female householder with no husband present, and 27.4% were non-families. 23.7% of all households were made up of individuals, and 9.7% had someone living alone who was 65 years of age or older. The average household size was 2.57 and the average family size was 3.04. In the county, the population was spread out, with 25.5% under the age of 18, 12.0% from 18 to 24, 26.5% from 25 to 44, 23.7% from 45 to 64, and 12.3% who were 65 years of age or older. The median age was 36 years. For every 100 females, there were 97.60 males. For every 100 females age 18 and over, there were 92.90 males.

As of 2000, the median income for a household in the county was $36,784, and the median income for a family was $44,340. Males had a median income of $31,345 versus $22,677 for females. The per capita income for the county was $17,872. About 8.7% of families and 12.9% of the population were below the poverty line, including 15.0% of those under age 18 and 13.0% of those age 65 or over.

== Politics ==
Voter Registration and Party Enrollment as of June 30, 2023
Party	Number of Voters	Percentage
Democratic	6,248	19.95%
Republican	19,466	62.16%
Unaffiliated	5,601	17.89%
Total	31,315	100%

Logan County is a reliably Republican county. Since 1960, it has only supported the Democratic presidential nominee twice; in 1964, when it backed Lyndon B. Johnson by a 53-47% margin, and in 1976, when it narrowly backed Jimmy Carter by a 50-48% margin. Barack Obama barely received a quarter of the county's vote in 2012, a poorer showing than that of even George McGovern in 1972. No Democratic candidate for governor has carried the county since Brad Henry in 2006, or for U.S. Senate since David Boren in 1990.

United States presidential election results for Logan County, Oklahoma
Year	Republican		Democratic		Third party(ies)	
Year	No.	%	No.	%	No.	%
1908	3,768	61.07%	2,183	35.38%	219	3.55%
1912	2,546	52.96%	1,700	35.37%	561	11.67%
1916	2,270	49.38%	1,701	37.00%	626	13.62%
1920	4,618	64.96%	2,209	31.07%	282	3.97%
1924	4,445	58.78%	2,366	31.29%	751	9.93%
1928	6,277	72.72%	2,251	26.08%	104	1.20%
1932	3,959	40.68%	5,773	59.32%	0	0.00%
1936	4,609	45.66%	5,425	53.74%	61	0.60%
1940	5,427	53.08%	4,752	46.47%	46	0.45%
1944	4,586	54.48%	3,795	45.09%	36	0.43%
1948	3,817	48.16%	4,109	51.84%	0	0.00%
1952	6,172	64.18%	3,444	35.82%	0	0.00%
1956	5,326	64.94%	2,875	35.06%	0	0.00%
1960	5,121	64.49%	2,820	35.51%	0	0.00%
1964	3,787	46.95%	4,279	53.05%	0	0.00%
1968	3,960	48.55%	2,508	30.75%	1,689	20.71%
1972	6,543	68.85%	2,760	29.04%	200	2.10%
1976	4,382	47.96%	4,594	50.28%	160	1.75%
1980	6,311	63.16%	3,246	32.49%	435	4.35%
1984	8,356	69.76%	3,551	29.65%	71	0.59%
1988	6,947	59.36%	4,603	39.33%	154	1.32%
1992	6,071	43.97%	4,453	32.25%	3,282	23.77%
1996	5,949	48.46%	4,854	39.54%	1,474	12.01%
2000	8,187	63.61%	4,510	35.04%	173	1.34%
2004	11,474	70.21%	4,869	29.79%	0	0.00%
2008	12,556	68.71%	5,717	31.29%	0	0.00%
2012	12,314	72.27%	4,724	27.73%	0	0.00%
2016	13,633	71.83%	4,248	22.38%	1,098	5.79%
2020	15,608	72.35%	5,455	25.29%	511	2.37%
2024	17,748	73.49%	5,901	24.44%	500	2.07%

== Communities ==
=== Cities ===
- Cedar Valley
- Crescent
- Guthrie (county seat)

=== Towns ===
- Cashion
- Cimarron City
- Coyle
- Langston
- Marshall
- Meridian
- Mulhall
- Orlando

=== Census-designated places ===
- Crescent Springs
- Lovell
- Seward
- Twin Lakes

=== Unincorporated communities ===
- * Four Counties Corner (formerly Lockridge)

== Notable people ==
- Edward P. McCabe
- During the early 1890s, noted lawman and gunman James Masterson served as a county Deputy Sheriff for Logan County.
- Angie Debo (1890 - 1988), historian

== National Register of Historic Places ==
Sites listed on the National Register of Historic Places:

- Carnegie Library, Guthrie
- Co-Operative Publishing Company Building, Guthrie
- Angie Debo House, Marshall
- Guthrie Armory, Guthrie
- Guthrie Historic District, Guthrie
- Langston University Cottage Row Historic District, Langston
- Logan County Courthouse, Guthrie
- Methodist Church of Marshall, Marshall
- Morris House, Langston
- Mulhall United Methodist Church, Mulhall
- Oklahoma State Bank Building, Mulhall
- Scottish Rite Temple, Guthrie
- St. Joseph Convent and Academy, Guthrie

== Media ==
Newspaper

- Guthrie News-Leader "Serving Logan County since 1892"
