= Lovell, Oklahoma =

- Census-designated place
- Location within Oklahoma Location within the United States
- Coordinates: 36°03′22″N 97°38′11″W
- Country: United States
- State: Oklahoma
- County: Logan

Area
  - Total: 0.11 sq mi (0.28 km^{2})
  - Land: 0.11 sq mi (0.28 km^{2})
  - Water: 0 sq mi (0.00 km^{2})
- Elevation: 1,024 ft (312 m)

Population (2020)
  - Total: 28
  - Density: 263/sq mi (101.6/km^{2})
- Time zone: UTC-6 (Central (CST))
  - Summer (DST): UTC-5 (CDT)
- ZIP Code: 73028 (Crescent)
- Area codes: 405/572
- FIPS code: 40-44200
- GNIS feature ID: 2812855

Lovell is a census-designated place (CDP) in Logan County, Oklahoma, United States. It was first determined by the United States Census Bureau prior to the 2020 census. As of the 2020 census, Lovell had a population of 28.

The CDP is in northwestern Logan County, 3 miles (5 km) west of State Highway 74. It is 10 miles (16 km) northwest of Crescent and 24 miles (39 km) northwest of Guthrie.

== Demographics ==
Historical population
Census	Pop.	Note	%±
2020	28		—
U.S. Decennial Census

=== 2020 census ===
As of the 2020 census, Lovell had a population of 28. The median age was 50.5 years. 3.6% of residents were under the age of 18 and 14.3% of residents were 65 years of age or older. For every 100 females there were 211.1 males, and for every 100 females age 18 and over there were 200.0 males age 18 and over.

0.0% of residents lived in urban areas, while 100.0% lived in rural areas.

There were 16 households in Lovell, of which 18.8% had children under the age of 18 living in them. Of all households, 81.3% were married-couple households, 12.5% were households with a male householder and no spouse or partner present, and 6.3% were households with a female householder and no spouse or partner present. About 12.6% of all households were made up of individuals and 0.0% had someone living alone who was 65 years of age or older.

There were 17 housing units, of which 5.9% were vacant. The homeowner vacancy rate was 0.0% and the rental vacancy rate was 0.0%.

Racial composition as of the 2020 census
Race	Number	Percent
White	20	71.4%
Black or African American	0	0.0%
American Indian and Alaska Native	0	0.0%
Asian	0	0.0%
Native Hawaiian and Other Pacific Islander	0	0.0%
Some other race	2	7.1%
Two or more races	6	21.4%
Hispanic or Latino (of any race)	1	3.6%
