= Overpass myth =

Misconception regarding overpasses and tornadoes

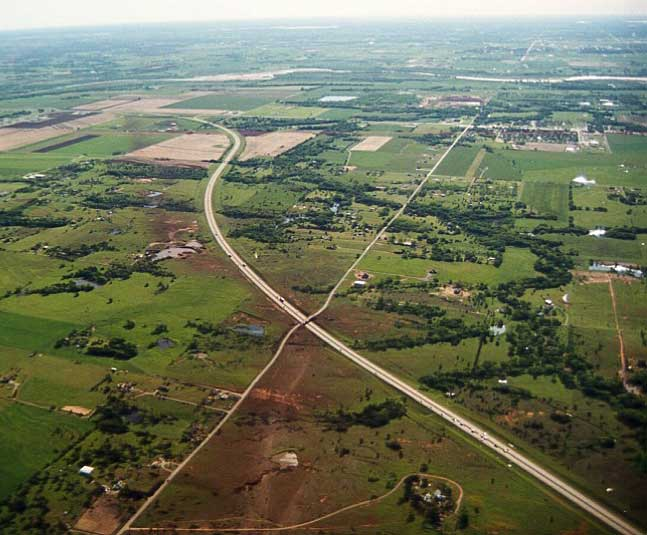
- An overpass impacted by the 1999 Bridge Creek-Moore tornado, where two people died
- Type: Tornado myth
- Fatalities attributed to myth: >3 (2 from the 1999 Bridge Creek-Moore F5 tornado and 1 from a weaker F2 tornado in Payne County)
- Hazards: Flying debris; Intense winds

The overpass myth, also known as the tornado overpass myth, refers to a common misconception that overpasses, usually located on highways, are a safe location to take shelter during a tornado. The myth gained mainstream attention in 1991 when a news crew had sheltered under an overpass during a weaker F2 tornado that didn't directly hit them and has been responsible for numerous deaths as a result of tornadoes, notably during the 1999 Bridge Creek–Moore tornado.

== History ==
The myth first gained mainstream attention in 1991, when a video of a news crew sheltering under a Kansas Turnpike overpass during an F2 tornado was spread across the United States, being watched by millions of people during newscasts and other television outlets. The video led many viewers to believe that overpasses were safe places to take shelter during tornadoes. The news crew survived with only minor injuries, further leading people to believe the myth. In May 1997, several drivers and videographers took shelter under a highway overpass to avoid a deadly F5 tornado that hit Jarrell, Texas; the overpass narrowly avoided being struck. One of the deadliest instances of the overpass myth being followed occurred on May 3, 1999, when two people were killed and over a dozen more were injured while sheltering under several overpasses from a violent tornado near Moore, Oklahoma. As a result, the myth was addressed by the National Weather Service at that year's National Weather Association Annual Meeting in Biloxi, Mississippi.

In a February 2024 publication of First Coast News, Dr. Harold Brooks with the National Weather Service stated in an interview with the channel that "Going under an overpass is just not a good idea for tornado safety. What we really want to think about with what makes something safe in a tornado is we're worried about horizontal winds, and we're not so much worried about debris falling on top of you but worried about stuff blowing sideways at you".

== Hazards ==
The location of a news crew under an overpass during a tornado in 1991. The broadcast helped popularized the overpass myth.

Several meteorologists have advocated that overpasses are insufficient shelter from tornado winds and debris, and may be among the worst places to take refuge during a violent tornado. The embankment under an overpass is higher than the surrounding terrain, and the wind speed increases with height. Additionally, the overpass design may create a wind tunnel effect under the span, further increasing the wind speed. Many overpasses are completely exposed underneath and most lack hanging girders or a crawlspace-like area to provide sufficient protection from debris, which can travel at high speeds even in weak tornadoes. People stopping underneath overpasses may also block the flow of traffic, putting others in danger.

Dangers involving overpasses during tornado events include flying debris impaling people taking shelter under overpasses, people being blown out from under the overpass, a structural failure of the overpass itself and other non-deadly hazards, including stopped vehicles under overpasses making it difficult for emergency vehicles to reach a tornado disaster site.

== Depiction in media ==
The myth is referenced in the 2024 movie Twisters, when the main characters take shelter under an overpass at the beginning of the movie, resulting in the deaths of several people.

== See also ==
- List of common misconceptions
- Tornado myths
