= Mulhall, Oklahoma =

- Town
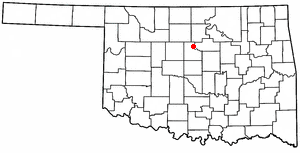
- Location of Mulhall, Oklahoma
- Coordinates: 36°03′48″N 97°24′14″W
- Country: United States
- State: Oklahoma
- Counties: Logan

Area
  - Total: 0.81 sq mi (2.11 km^{2})
  - Land: 0.81 sq mi (2.11 km^{2})
  - Water: 0 sq mi (0.00 km^{2})
- Elevation: 994 ft (303 m)

Population (2020)
  - Total: 212
  - Density: 260.7/sq mi (100.65/km^{2})
- Time zone: UTC-6 (Central (CST))
  - Summer (DST): UTC-5 (CDT)
- ZIP code: 73063
- Area codes: 405/572
- FIPS code: 40-49900
- GNIS feature ID: 2413028

Mulhall is a town in Logan (mostly) and Payne counties in Oklahoma, United States. The population was 212 as of the 2020 United States census. It is part of the Oklahoma City metropolitan area.

== History ==
The town began as a railroad station for the Santa Fe railroad, and was originally named Alfred, for the son of an attorney. The town is named for Zach Mulhall, father of Lucille Mulhall, who was the first official 'cowgirl' to actually compete against men in rodeo events and win. (Note: Zach Mulhall (1847-1931) was a local rancher, railway livestock agent and Wild West show proprietor. He was elected mayor of the town in 1890.) The town name was changed from Alfred to Mulhall shortly after the land run of 1889 because there were two towns named 'Alfred' at that time, according to a petition made by Zach to the railroad.

Zach Mulhall hosted his own show for many years across the country, with Lucille starring in those shows along with her siblings. Zach and the Mulhall family were also friends with the Miller Brothers of 101 Ranch Fame in nearby Ponca City and often performed with them and shared talent for their shows when needed. Will Rogers and Tom Mix were also integral parts of the early years of the shows and Will (then performing under the stage name, "The Cherokee Kid}") is credited with teaching Lucille how to twirl-another talent for which she was known.

Carrie Nation visited Mulhall in 1901 to tell the town saloons about the evils of liquor and warning that she would return. The town immediately ordered the saloon out of business.

In 1907, ''Leslie's Weekly'' carried a picture of Lucille, calling her the world's champion lariat thrower, a title she won in San Antonio. It also states that she entertained President Theodore Roosevelt.

About 80 percent of the town was destroyed on May 3, 1999, 110 years after the town's founding, by a violent high-end F4 tornado (possibly F5 before hitting the town) which was recorded to be well over one mile wide at times. The town's water tower collapsed due to the violent winds. Fortunately, police were able to warn residents of the imminent danger and no one in Mulhall was killed. However, besides the water tower collapsing, the wedge tornado also leveled 60–70% of the 130 homes in Mulhall and destroyed the Mulhall/Orlando Elementary School.

Lucille's Restaurant, located in the old Bank Building, was one of the few original structures to survive the tornado. The restaurant boasted eclectic photographs of Lucille and her family during the heyday of their lives and performances in Wild West shows featured in the decor. On September 2, 2009, the restaurant was extensively damaged by fire. It was rebuilt and catered to a variety of customers from families to bikers. On October 21, 2018, it closed permanently. On March 12, 2021, the restaurant was purchased by new owners and is being reopened under the name Lucille's Chuckwagon on May 20, 2021. The Methodist church also survived, and is pictured behind the old Mulhall School.

== Geography ==
Mulhall is 13 miles (21 km) north of Guthrie. According to the United States Census Bureau, the town has a total area of 0.2 square miles (0.52 km^{2}), all land.

== Demographics ==
Historical population
| Census | Pop. | Note | %± |
|---|---|---|---|
| 1900 | 564 | | — |
| 1910 | 441 | | −21.8% |
| 1920 | 385 | | −12.7% |
| 1930 | 374 | | −2.9% |
| 1940 | 406 | | 8.6% |
| 1950 | 320 | | −21.2% |
| 1960 | 253 | | −20.9% |
| 1970 | 250 | | −1.2% |
| 1980 | 301 | | 20.4% |
| 1990 | 199 | | −33.9% |
| 2000 | 239 | | 20.1% |
| 2010 | 225 | | −5.9% |
| 2020 | 212 | | −5.8% |
U.S. Decennial Census

=== 2020 census ===
As of the 2020 census, Mulhall had a population of 212. The median age was 45.0 years. 27.8% of residents were under the age of 18 and 16.0% of residents were 65 years of age or older. For every 100 females there were 87.6 males, and for every 100 females age 18 and over there were 84.3 males age 18 and over.

0.0% of residents lived in urban areas, while 100.0% lived in rural areas.

There were 86 households in Mulhall, of which 37.2% had children under the age of 18 living in them. Of all households, 53.5% were married-couple households, 14.0% were households with a male householder and no spouse or partner present, and 22.1% were households with a female householder and no spouse or partner present. About 20.9% of all households were made up of individuals and 15.1% had someone living alone who was 65 years of age or older.

There were 98 housing units, of which 12.2% were vacant. The homeowner vacancy rate was 0.0% and the rental vacancy rate was 0.0%.

Racial composition as of the 2020 census
| Race | Number | Percent |
|---|---|---|
| White | 184 | 86.8% |
| Black or African American | 0 | 0.0% |
| American Indian and Alaska Native | 7 | 3.3% |
| Asian | 1 | 0.5% |
| Native Hawaiian and Other Pacific Islander | 0 | 0.0% |
| Some other race | 3 | 1.4% |
| Two or more races | 17 | 8.0% |
| Hispanic or Latino (of any race) | 9 | 4.2% |

=== 2000 census ===
As of the census of 2000, there were 239 people, 88 households, and 69 families residing in the town. The population density was 957.3 inhabitants per square mile (369.6/km^{2}). There were 94 housing units at an average density of 376.5 per square mile (145.4/km^{2}). The racial makeup of the town was 91.63% White, 1.67% Native American, 1.26% Pacific Islander, 0.84% from other races, and 4.60% from two or more races. Hispanic or Latino of any race were 3.35% of the population.

There were 88 households, out of which 37.5% had children under the age of 18 living with them, 62.5% were married couples living together, 11.4% had a female householder with no husband present, and 20.5% were non-families. 17.0% of all households were made up of individuals, and 9.1% had someone living alone who was 65 years of age or older. The average household size was 2.72 and the average family size was 2.96.

In the town, the population was spread out, with 27.2% under the age of 18, 7.5% from 18 to 24, 28.0% from 25 to 44, 23.0% from 45 to 64, and 14.2% who were 65 years of age or older. The median age was 34 years. For every 100 females, there were 95.9 males. For every 100 females age 18 and over, there were 89.1 males.

The median income for a household in the town was $31,750, and the median income for a family was $37,969. Males had a median income of $30,500 versus $21,875 for females. The per capita income for the town was $13,804. About 14.1% of families and 15.4% of the population were below the poverty line, including 11.6% of those under the age of eighteen and 18.8% of those 65 or over.

== Notable people ==
- Zona Maie Griswold (1889–1961), concert singer, born in Mulhall

== See also ==
- List of cities and towns in Oklahoma
