= Cimarron City, Oklahoma =

- Town
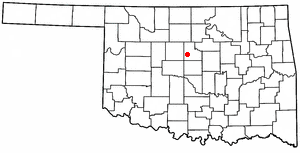
- Location of Cimarron City, Oklahoma
- Coordinates: 35°53′19″N 97°36′08″W
- Country: United States
- State: Oklahoma
- County: Logan

Area
  - Total: 1.79 sq mi (4.64 km^{2})
  - Land: 1.69 sq mi (4.37 km^{2})
  - Water: 0.10 sq mi (0.27 km^{2})
- Elevation: 968 ft (295 m)

Population (2020)
  - Total: 155
  - Density: 91.9/sq mi (35.49/km^{2})
- Time zone: UTC-6 (Central (CST))
  - Summer (DST): UTC-5 (CDT)
- FIPS code: 40-14500
- GNIS feature ID: 2413203

Cimarron City is a town in Logan County, Oklahoma, United States. As of the 2020 census, Cimarron City had a population of 155. It is part of the Oklahoma City Metropolitan Statistical Area. Cimarron City is a combination bedroom and retirement community.

== History ==
Cimarron City is a planned community that was founded in July 1973 by real estate developers. J. L. Swaim, a former Oklahoma resident residing in Chico, California, and real estate dealer Don McLaughlin, of Oklahoma City. Leon Spitz, an Oklahoma City engineer, designed the residential section. The community grew slowly, as homes were constructed for families and retirees who wanted to live amid a rural ambience. Residents who still work typically must commute to Oklahoma City, Guthrie, Edmond or Crescent. It incorporated in 1974, and was named for the Cimarron River, which flows through the southwestern part of the town.

== Geography ==
Cimarron City lies 2 miles (3.2 km) south of Crescent and 10 miles (16 km) west of Guthrie.

According to the United States Census Bureau, the town has a total area of 1.7 square miles (4.4 km^{2}), of which, 1.6 square miles (4.1 km^{2}) of it is land and 0.1 square miles (0.26 km^{2}) of it (7.56%) is water.

== Demographics ==
Historical population
Census	Pop.	Note	%±
1990	71		—
2000	110		54.9%
2010	150		36.4%
2020	155		3.3%
U.S. Decennial Census

=== 2020 census ===
As of the 2020 census, Cimarron City had a population of 155. The median age was 44.3 years. 25.2% of residents were under the age of 18 and 21.3% of residents were 65 years of age or older. For every 100 females there were 103.9 males, and for every 100 females age 18 and over there were 96.6 males age 18 and over.

0.0% of residents lived in urban areas, while 100.0% lived in rural areas.

There were 55 households in Cimarron City, of which 36.4% had children under the age of 18 living in them. Of all households, 52.7% were married-couple households, 18.2% were households with a male householder and no spouse or partner present, and 20.0% were households with a female householder and no spouse or partner present. About 30.9% of all households were made up of individuals and 21.9% had someone living alone who was 65 years of age or older.

There were 64 housing units, of which 14.1% were vacant. The homeowner vacancy rate was 3.4% and the rental vacancy rate was 0.0%.

Racial composition as of the 2020 census
Race	Number	Percent
White	138	89.0%
Black or African American	0	0.0%
American Indian and Alaska Native	10	6.5%
Asian	0	0.0%
Native Hawaiian and Other Pacific Islander	0	0.0%
Some other race	0	0.0%
Two or more races	7	4.5%
Hispanic or Latino (of any race)	4	2.6%

=== 2000 census ===
As of the census of 2000, there were 110 people, 44 households, and 30 families residing in the town. The population density was 69.2 inhabitants per square mile (26.7/km^{2}). There were 49 housing units at an average density of 30.8 per square mile (11.9/km^{2}). The racial makeup of the town was 90.91% White, 1.82% African American, 4.55% Native American, 0.91% from other races, and 1.82% from two or more races. Hispanic or Latino of any race were 1.82% of the population.

There were 44 households, out of which 34.1% had children under the age of 18 living with them, 54.5% were married couples living together, 9.1% had a female householder with no husband present, and 31.8% were non-families. 27.3% of all households were made up of individuals, and 6.8% had someone living alone who was 65 years of age or older. The average household size was 2.50 and the average family size was 3.03.

In the town, the population was spread out, with 28.2% under the age of 18, 2.7% from 18 to 24, 28.2% from 25 to 44, 30.9% from 45 to 64, and 10.0% who were 65 years of age or older. The median age was 40 years. For every 100 females, there were 120.0 males. For every 100 females age 18 and over, there were 125.7 males.

The median income for a household in the town was $34,219, and the median income for a family was $50,625. Males had a median income of $30,938 versus $9,583 for females. The per capita income for the town was $17,380. There were 10.3% of families and 14.3% of the population living below the poverty line, including 31.3% of under eighteens and 14.3% of those over 64.
