= Paleoworld season 1 =

Paleoworld
- Season 1
- No. of episodes: 13

Season chronology
- Next → Season 2

Paleoworld (season 1) is the first season of Paleoworld.

== Episodes ==
No.	Title	Original release date
1	"Rise of the Predators"	28 September 1994
This episode explores predator dinosaurs from primitive ones to advanced ones. Animals unnamed sauropod rhynchosaur Eoraptor Herrerasaurus Tyrannosaurus rex Dimetrodon Exaeretodon Staurikosaurus Syntarsus Coelophysis neotheropods (identified as Jurassic and Cretaceous theropods) ornithomimids Gallimimus Utahraptor dromaeosaurs Deinonychus Velociraptor Protoceratops Troodon cerritosaur Fossil sites featured Valley of the Moon Ghost Ranch
2	"Carnosaurs: The Giant Predators"	28 September 1994
This episode explores large meat eating dinosaurs; the carnosaurs. Animals Albertosaurus ornithomimids ankylosaurs Triceratops Seismosaurus Carnotaurus Cryolophosaurus Tyrannosaurus rex Fossil sites Alberta Badlands
3	"Flight of the Pterosaurs"	2 October 1994
This episode explores the world of pterosaurs. Animals pterodactyls Pteranodon Mosasaurus Quetzalcoatlus rhamphorhynchoids pterodactyloids Nyctosaurus (unidentified) Pterodactylus Fossil sites featured Niobrara Chalk Beds Solnhofen limestone
4	"Back to the Seas"	9 October 1994
This episode explores the evolution of whales. Animals Archaeopteryx Pakicetus Rodhocetus Zygorhiza Basilosaurus mesonychians Indocetus Ambulocetus prehistoric pinnipeds manatees mosasaurs Fossil sites featured Shark Tooth Hills
5	"Missing Links"	23 October 1994
This episode explores human evolution. Animals Homo erectus Peking Man Homo sapiens saber-toothed cave lion
6	"Sea Monsters"	30 October 1994
This episode explores the prehistoric marine reptiles. Animals ichthyosaurs Triassic ichthyosaur Jurassic ichthyosaur Bottlenose dolphin plesiosaurs thaumatosaur Elasmosaurus pilosaur Peloneustes kronosaur Platecarpus Mosasaurus maximus megalodon great white shark
7	"Tale of a Sail"	6 November 1994
This episode explores the dynasty of mammal-like reptiles. Animals Dimetrodon Ophiacodon Edaphosaurus Estemmenosuchus Lystrosaurus Inostrancevia alexandri Cynognathus Thrinaxodon Morganucodon Fossil sites featured Texas Red Beds
8	"Attack of the Killer Kangaroos"	13 November 1994
This episode explores the glory days of marsupials. Animals flesh-eating kangaroo (possibly Ekaltadeta) Cocopalia saber-toothed marsupial borhyaenids marsupial lion giant kangaroo (possibly Procoptodon) giant wombat hippopotamus sized marsupial Tasmanian wolf Tasmanian devil Opossum Common kangaroo Fossil sites featured Riversleigh
9	"Dino Sex"	19 November 1994
This episode explores the sex life of dinosaurs. Animals Tyrannosaurus Pachycephalosaurus ceratopsians Triceratops Pachyrhinosaurus Brontosaurus duck-billed dinosaurs Kritosaurus Saurolophus Lambeosaurus Parasaurolophus Stegosaurus
10	"The Legendary T-rex"	27 November 1994
This episode explores Tyrannosaurus. Animals Tyrannosaurus Velociraptor duck-billed dinosaurs horned dinosaurs Allosaurus Troodon Nanotyrannus
11	"Dino Doctors"	11 December 1994
This episode explores new clues about lives of dinosaurs. Animals Hadrosaurs Sauropods Diplodocus Mamenchisaurus Velociraptor
12	"The Mysteries of Extinction"	21 December 1994
This episode explores the extinction of the dinosaurs. Animals Tyrannosaurus Triceratops
13	"Mistaken Identity"	15 January 1995
This episode explores mistakes of paleontologists about prehistory. Animals Protoceratops Oviraptor giant sloths mammoths mosasaurs Iguanadon Megalosaurus Brontosaurus Camarasaurus Diplodocus Apatosaurus
