= Paleoworld season 4 =

Paleoworld
- Season 4
- No. of episodes: 10

Season chronology
- ← Previous; Season 3

Paleoworld (season 4) is the fourth season of Paleoworld. It includes the episodes "Prehistoric Sharks" and "Dinosaur Doomsday" which aired in 1998.

== List of episodes (in original order) ==
No.	Title	Original release date
1	"The Loch Ness Secret"	10 October 1997
This episode explores the secret behind the Loch Ness monster. Animals ichthyosaurs mosasaurs Plesiosaurus
2	"Dawn of the Dinos"	9 January 1998 (UK)
This episode explores Coelophysis. Animals Coelophysis Metoposaurus phytosaurs Desmatosuchus Fossil sites featured Ghost Ranch
3	"Killer Raptors"	1 February 1998 (UK)
This episode explores raptors. Animals Tenontosaurus Deinonychus Utahraptor Megaraptor Fossil sites featured somewhere near Hell Creek Formation Como Bluff
4	"Clash of the Titans"	6 February 1998 (UK)
This episode explores T. rex vs Giganotosaurus. Animals Tyrannosaurus Giganotosaurus Carcharodontosaurus
5	"Prehistoric Sharks"	27 March 1998 (UK)
This episode explores prehistoric sharks and their relatives. Animals rhizodont Stethacanthus Falcatus Cretoxyrhina mosasaurs megalodon
6	"Valley of Venom"	4 May 1998
This episode explores snake evolution. Animals Pachyrhachis Hovasaurus mosasaur Paleopython
7	"Baby Monsters"	4 May 1998
This episode explores baby dinosaurs. Animals duck-billed dinosaurs Maiasaura Troodon Oviraptor Therizinosaurus
8	"Secrets of the Brontosaurus"	6 May 1998
This episode explores Brontosaurus. Animals Brontosaurus Camarasaurus Diplodocus
9	"Dinosaur Doomsday"	23 June 1998 (UK)
This episode explores the extinction of the dinosaurs. Animals unnamed Hadrosaur
10	"Valley of the Uglies"	27 June 1998 (UK)
This episode explores a valley with full of monstrous mammals. Animals Diatryma panzer croc unnamed elephant shrew like mammal Cimolestes (unidendified) Hyaenodon horridus unnamed saber-toothed cat (possibly Dinictis) killer hogs Dinohyus brontotheres oreodonts Fossil sites featured White River Badlands
