= Paleoworld season 3 =

Paleoworld
- Season 3
- No. of episodes: 13

Season chronology
- ← Previous; Season 2 Next → Season 4

Paleoworld (Season 3) is the third season of Paleoworld.

== List of episodes (In original order) ==
List of episodes
Nº	Episode title	Fossil sites	Animals	Air date
1	Ancient Crocodiles	Big Bend National Park US, Purus and Manaus Brazil.	Deinosuchus, Gryposaurus, Notosuchia (Hoofed Crocodylomorph) Thalattosuchia (Crocodylomorph with Fins) and Purussaurus.	30 September 1996
2	Dawn of the Cats	La Brea Tar Pits, White River, US	Smilodon, Megalonyx (Giant Sloth), Dire Wolf, Eusmilus, Barbourofelis and Teleoceras.	7 October 1996
3	Boneheads	Hell Creek, US.	Pachycephalosaurus, Homalocephale and Stygimoloch.	14 October 1996
4	Amber Hunters	Dominican Amber, Dominican Republic.	Toxorhynchites.	21 October 1996
5	Dinos in the Snow	Prince Creek, US.	Ugrunaaluk (Edmontosaurus), Nanuqsaurus (Albertosaurus), Pachyrhinosaurus (Triceratops), Lambeosaurus, Parasaurolophus, Stegosaurus, Allosaurus and Sauropods.	18 October 1996
6	Armored Dinos	Morrison and Cedar Mountain, US.	Stegosaurus, Allosaurus, Gastonia and Utahraptor.	4 November 1996
7	Flesh on the Bones	Kem Kem Beds, Morocco	Deltadromeus, Carcharodontosaurus, Onchopristis (Saw Fish) and Lissodus (Shark):	11 November 1996
8	Ape Man	Rift Valley, Ethiopia	Australopithecus.	18 November 1996
9	Horns and Herds	Hell Creek, US and Dinosaur Park, Canada.	Triceratops, Tyrannosaurus, Torosaurus, Chasmosaurus, Styracosaurus, Einiosaurus, Pachyrhinosaurus, Achelousaurus, Unescoceratops and Centrosaurus.	9 December 1996
10	Treasure Island	Maevarano, Madagascar.	Rapetosaurus (Titanosaur), Majungasaurus and Vorona.	16 December 1996
11	Dino Diet	California, Indiana, Montana, US.	Cows, Deinonychus, Komodo dragon, Maiasaura, Pteranodon, Sauropods, Triceratops, and Tyrannosaurus rex.	23 December 1996
12	Dwarf Dinos	Hateg Island and Bauxite of Cornet, Romania	Balaur, Telmatosaurus, Zalmoxes, Magyarosaurus, Valdosaurus and Bihariosaurus.	4 July 1997
13	Early Birds	Solnhofen, Germany, Las Hoyas, Spain and Anacleto Argentina.	Archaeopteryx, Velociraptor, Iberomesornis, Concornis, Eoalulavis, Neuquenornis, Patagopteryx and Alvarezsaurus.	11 July 1997
