= 1999 Bridge Creek–Moore tornado =

F5 tornado in Oklahoma, U.S.

Coordinates: 35.22°N 97.73°W

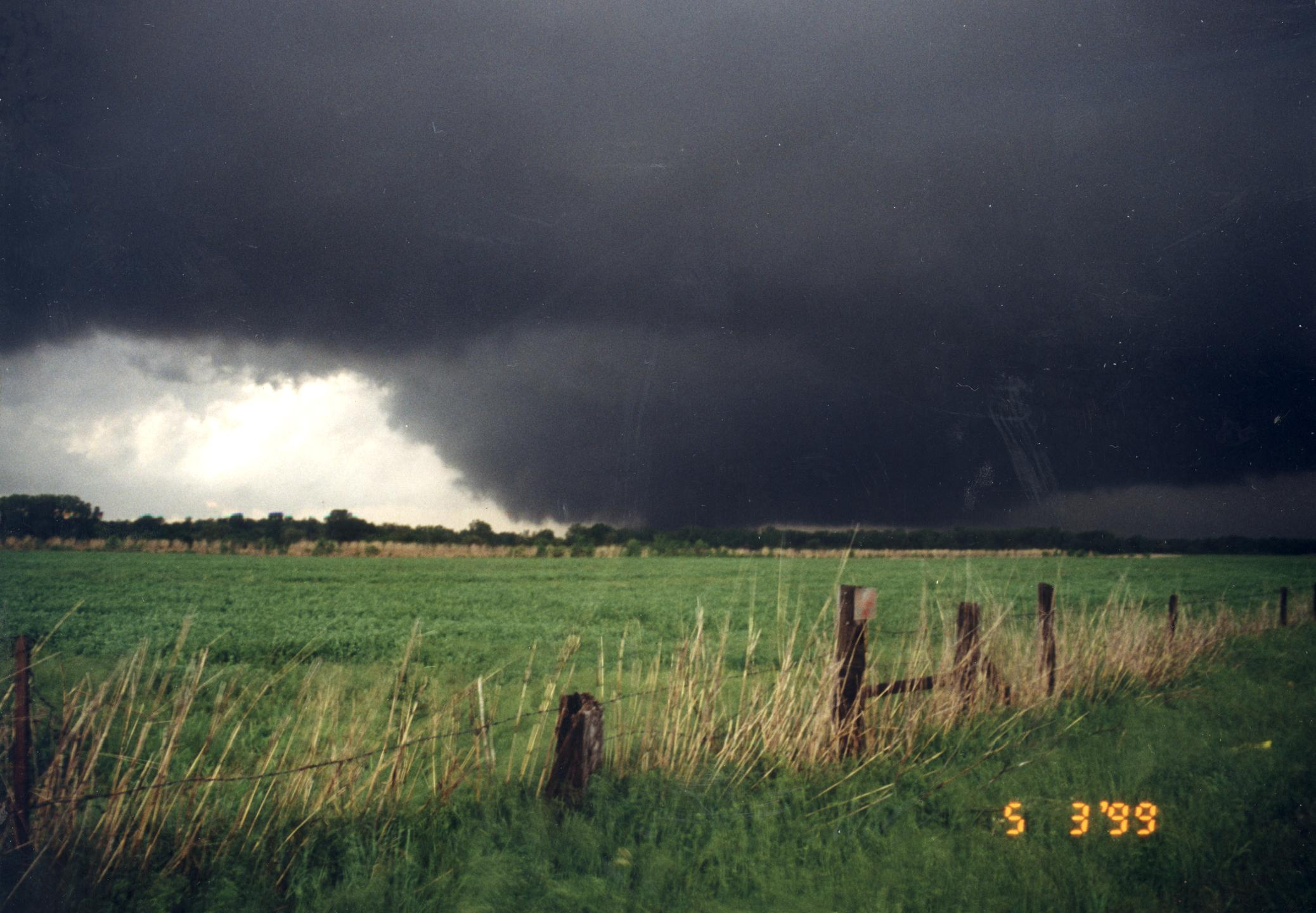
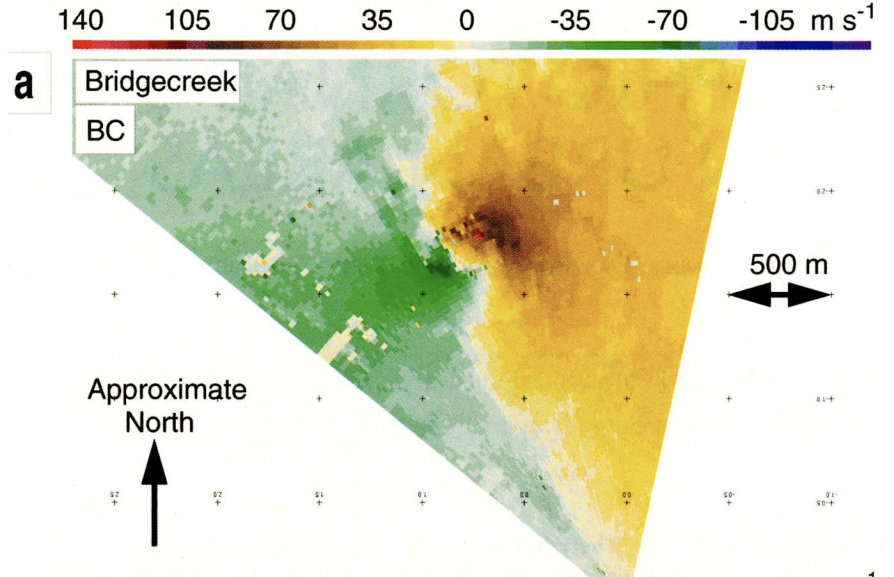
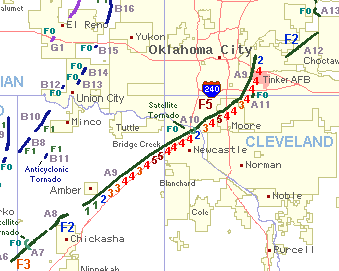
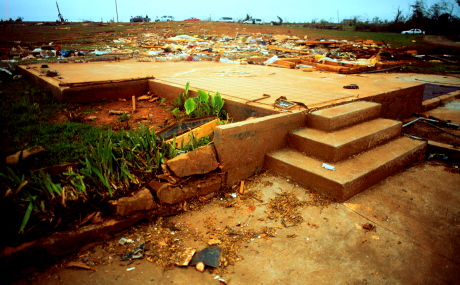
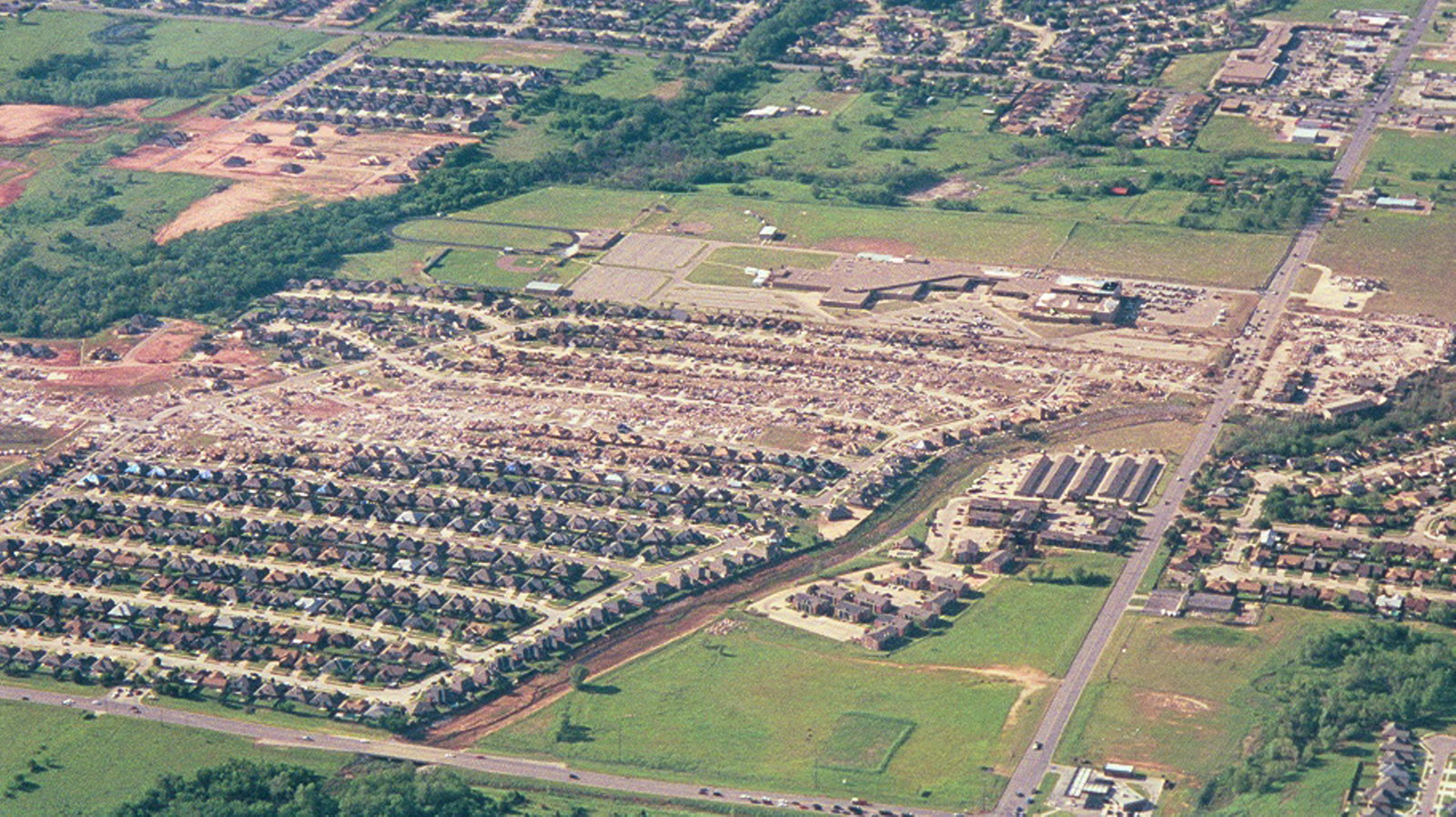
- Clockwise from top: View of the tornado near its peak intensity in Bridge Creek; track of the F5 tornado (center track) and other tornadoes near Oklahoma City during the outbreak; F5 damage to a neighborhood in Moore; a home that was swept clean at F5 intensity in Bridge Creek; Doppler on Wheels (DOW) scan of the tornado at the moment of its peak intensity just off Interstate 44 at 6:53 p.m. (23:53 UTC)

Meteorological history
- Formed: May 3, 1999, 6:23 p.m. CDT (UTC−05:00)
- Dissipated: May 3, 1999, 7:48 pm. CDT (UTC−05:00)
- Duration: 1 hour, 25 minutes

F5 tornado
- on the Fujita scale
- Max width: 1,760 yards (1.0 mi; 1.6 km)
- Path length: 38 miles (61 km)
- Highest winds: 321 mph (517 km/h) (Worldwide record high as measured by Doppler on Wheels [DOW] radar) (Note: It is officially accepted that the rating for this tornado is F5; however, a ±20 mph (32 km/h) wind speed ambiguity from initial estimates has occasionally led some people to suggest that this tornado may have briefly been an F6 tornado. On the original Fujita Scale, F6 was a theoretical classification for an "inconceivable tornado", with a wind speed in excess of 318 mph (512 km/h), but no tornado ever produced winds officially at or above 319 mph (513 km/h). The United States National Weather Service has officially maintained that the Bridge Creek–Moore tornado is an F5 tornado, and will not be reclassified F6.)

Overall effects
- Fatalities: 36 (+5 indirect)
- Injuries: 583
- Damage: $1 billion (1999 USD) $1.9 billion (2025 USD)
- Areas affected: Grady, McClain, Cleveland and Oklahoma counties in Oklahoma; with the worst impacts occurring in the towns/cities of Bridge Creek, Moore, Oklahoma City, Del City, and Midwest City
- Part of the 1999 Great Plains tornado outbreak and tornadoes of 1999

The 1999 Bridge Creek–Moore tornado was a large, long-lived, and exceptionally violent F5 tornado that produced the highest tornado wind speed ever recorded by doppler weather radar—321 miles per hour (517 km/h), measured by a Doppler on Wheels (DoW). One of the strongest tornadoes ever recorded to affect a metropolitan area, the tornado devastated southern portions of Oklahoma City, Oklahoma, as well as surrounding municipalities to the south and southwest of the city during the early evening of Monday, May 3, 1999. The tornado covered 38 miles (61 km) during its 85-minute existence, destroying thousands of homes, killing 36 people (plus another five indirectly), and causing US$1 billion (1999 USD) in damage, ranking it as the fifth-costliest on record not accounting for inflation. Its severity prompted the first-ever use of the tornado emergency statement by the National Weather Service.

The tornado first touched down at 6:23 p.m. Central Daylight Time (CDT) in Grady County, roughly two miles (3.2 km) south-southwest of the town of Amber. It quickly intensified into a violent F4, and gradually reached F5 status after traveling 6.5 miles (10.5 km), at which time it struck the town of Bridge Creek, where parts of the community were rendered unrecognizable. It fluctuated in strength, ranging from F2 to F5 status before it crossed into Cleveland County where it reached F5 intensity for a third time shortly before entering the city of Moore. By 7:30 p.m., the tornado crossed into Oklahoma County and battered southeastern Oklahoma City, Del City, and Midwest City before dissipating around 7:48 p.m. just outside Midwest City. The greatest impacts from the tornado occurred near peak intensity in the densely populated southern suburbs and exurbs of the Oklahoma City metropolitan area. A total of 8,132 homes, 1,041 apartments, 260 businesses, eleven public buildings, and seven churches were damaged or destroyed.

Large-scale search and rescue operations immediately took place in the affected areas. A major disaster declaration was signed by President Bill Clinton the following day (May 4) allowing the state to receive federal aid. In the following months, disaster aid amounted to $67.8 million. Reconstruction projects in subsequent years led to a safer, tornado-ready community. On May 20, 2013, nearby areas adjacent to the 1999 storm's track were again devastated by another large and violent EF5 tornado, resulting in 24 fatalities and extreme damage in the South Oklahoma City/Moore area.

== Meteorological synopsis ==
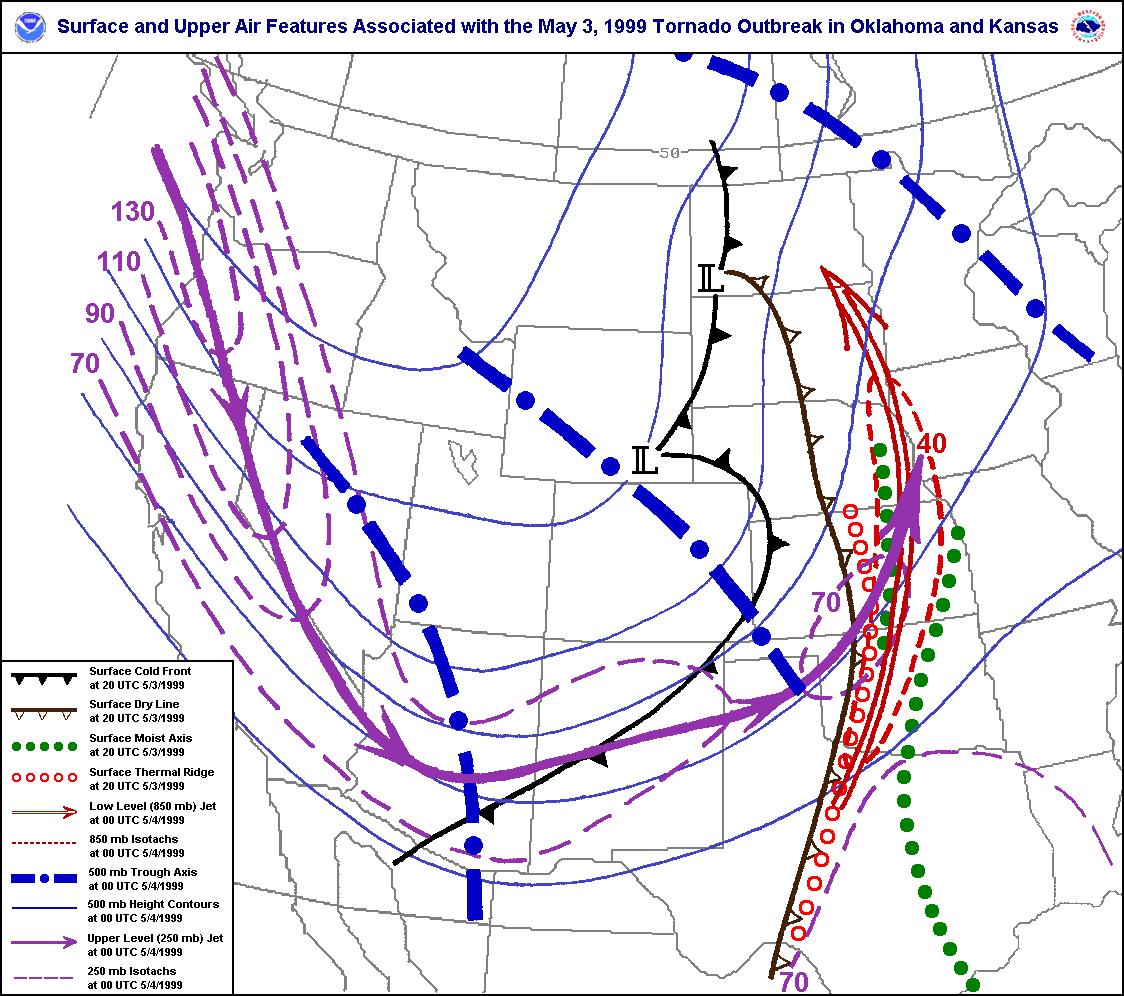
A map of the meteorological setup of the outbreak. The map displays surface and upper level atmospheric features associated with the outbreak.

The Bridge Creek–Moore tornado was part of a much larger outbreak which produced 71 tornadoes across five states throughout the Central Plains on May 3 alone, along with an additional 25 that touched down a day later in some of the areas affected by the previous day's activity (some of which were spawned by supercells that developed on the evening of May 3), stretching eastward to the Mississippi River Valley. The most prolific tornadic activity associated with the May 3 outbreak – and the multi-day outbreak as a whole – occurred in Oklahoma; 14 of the 66 tornadoes that occurred within the state that afternoon and evening produced damage consistent with the Fujita scale's "strong" (F2–F3) and "violent" (F4–F5) categories, which, in addition to the areas struck by the Bridge Creek–Moore tornado family, affected towns such as Mulhall, Cimarron City, Dover, Choctaw and Stroud.

=== Setup ===
The outbreak was caused by a vigorous upper-level trough that moved into the Central and Southern Plains states on the morning of May 3. That morning, low stratus clouds overspread much of Oklahoma, with clear skies along and west of a dry line located from Gage to Childress, Texas. Air temperatures at 7:00 a.m. Central Daylight Time ranged in the mid to upper 60s °F (upper 10s to near 20 °C) across the region, while dew point values ranged in the low to mid 60s °F (mid to upper 10s °C). The Storm Prediction Center (SPC) in Norman, Oklahoma, a division of the National Weather Service, initially issued a slight risk of severe thunderstorms early that morning stretching from the Kansas-Nebraska border to parts of southern Texas, with an intended threat of large hail, damaging winds and tornadoes. By late morning, the low cloud cover began to dissipate in advance of the dry line, but during the afternoon high cirrus clouds overspread the region, resulting in filtered sunshine in some areas that caused atmospheric destabilization. The sunshine and heating, combined with abundant low-level moisture, combined to produce a very unstable air mass. Upper air balloon soundings observed strong directional wind shear, cooling temperatures at high atmospheric levels, and the increased potential of CAPE values potentially exceeding 4000 J/kg, levels that are considered favorable for supercells and tornadoes.

=== Forecast and initiation ===
The SPC's Day 1 Convective Outlook for May 3, showing the Categorical Graphic

As observations and forecasts began to indicate an increasing likelihood of widespread severe weather conditions even more favorable for strong tornadoes, the SPC issued a moderate risk of severe weather at 11:15 a.m. CDT for portions of Kansas, Oklahoma and Texas along and near the Interstate 40 corridor.

... N CENTRAL TX/OK/SRN KS ...

LOW LEVEL JET WILL MAINTAIN SIGNIFICANT INFLOW OF LOW LEVEL MOISTURE WITH SURFACE DEWPOINTS AROUND 65F. CLEARING SKIES EVIDENT ON VISIBLE IMAGES WILL FURTHER CONTRIBUTE TO STRONG DESTABILIZATION OVER REGION WITH LATE AFTERNOON MUCAPES FORECASTED FROM 3500 TO 4500 J/KG OVER MDT RISK AREA. AS SHORT WAVE APPROACHES WRN OK/TX BORDER…LIFTING WILL DEEPEN NEAR/ALONG DRYLINE WITH THUNDERSTORMS INCREASING AS THEY MOVE EWD INTO INSTABILITY AXIS. 50 KT MID LEVEL SWLY FLOW SPREADING OVER LOW LEVEL JET AXIS WILL PROVIDE SUFFICIENT SHEAR FOR A FEW STRONG OR VIOLENT TORNADIC SUPERCELLS GIVEN THE ABUNDANT LOW LEVEL MOISTURE AND THE HIGH INSTABILITY.

— NWS Storm Prediction Center (SPC), May 3, 1999 1630 UTC Day 1 Convective Outlook

At 3:49 p.m. CDT, the SPC − having gathered enough data to surmise that there was a credible threat of a significant severe weather outbreak occurring within the next few hours − amended its Day 1 Convective Outlook to place the western nine-tenths of the main body of Oklahoma, central and south-central Kansas and the northern two-thirds of Texas under a high severe weather risk, denoting a higher than normal probability of strong (F2+) tornadoes within the risk area. About 40 minutes after the revised outlook's issuance, at 4:30 p.m. CDT, the SPC issued a tornado watch for western and central Oklahoma, effective from 4:45 p.m. until 10:00 p.m. CDT that evening, for the threat of tornadoes, hail up to three inches (7.6 cm) in diameter, wind gusts to 80 mph (130 km/h) and intense lightning. As that happened, the first thunderstorm cell of the unfolding event had already formed over southwestern Oklahoma.

== Storm development and tornado summary ==
=== Supercell thunderstorm develops ===
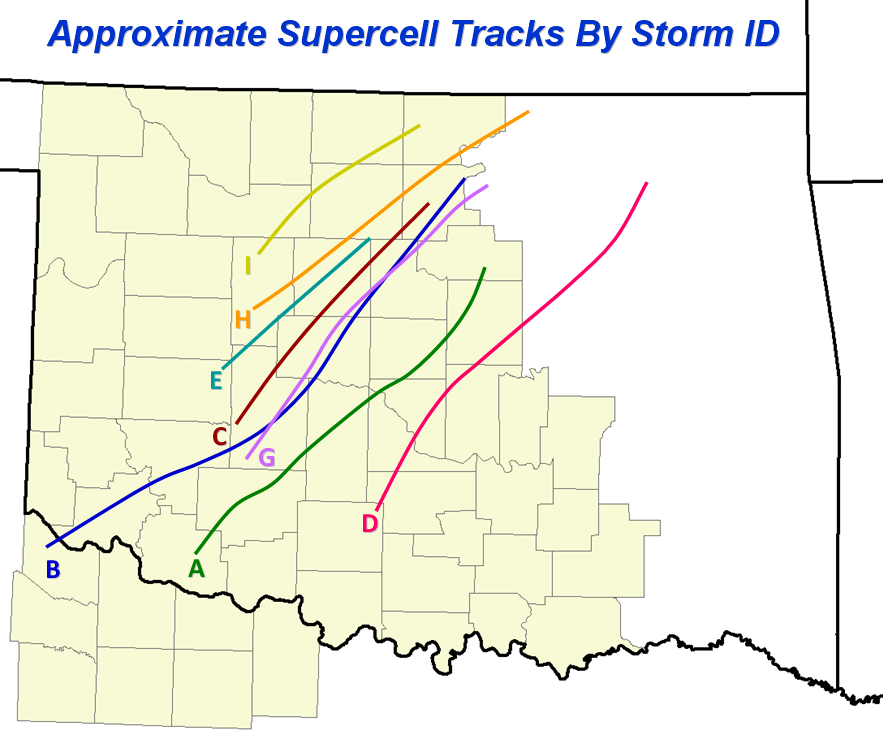
Approximate tracks of the supercells during the outbreak. The supercell that spawned the F5 tornado is marked "A" in green.

The thunderstorm that eventually produced the F5 tornado began developing around 3:20 p.m. CDT that afternoon over northeastern Tillman County (southwest of Faxon). Despite the lack of overall lift prevalent in the region, the storm formed out of a contrail-like horizontal area of convective clouds that developed during peak surface heating over southwestern Oklahoma, located well ahead of the dry line that was still positioned farther to the west, which provided enhanced lift and speed shear necessary to develop the supercell. Tracking northeast, the storm strengthened and entered Comanche County shortly after 4:00 p.m. CDT. By 4:15 p.m. CDT, the NWS Norman office issued a severe thunderstorm warning for Comanche County, as the initial storm continued to rapidly intensify over the southern half of the county; there, hail up to 1.75 inches (4.4 cm) in diameter fell.

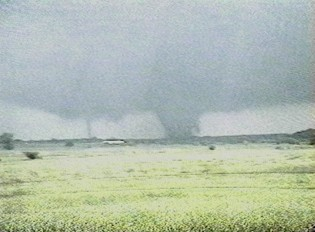
An F3 tornado near Chickasha (right) and an associated satellite tornado (left). These two were predecessor tornadoes to the Bridge Creek–Moore tornado.

As the supercell's mesocyclonic rotation began to rapidly strengthen at the cloud base, a tornado warning was issued for the counties of Comanche, Caddo, and Grady at 4:50 p.m. CDT; one minute later, a small tornado roughly 25 yards (75 ft) in diameter − the first of fourteen associated with supercell "A" (NWS Norman designated lettered names for the three tornado-producing supercells in the outbreak in storm surveys) − developed seven miles (11 km) east-northeast of Medicine Park along U.S. Route 62. Five more tornadoes developed as the storm continued northeast; a sixth one, which would be given an F3 rating, formed a short time later and caused substantial damage in central Grady County, including some to the Chickasha Municipal Airport, where roofs were torn off of two hangars.

=== Bridge Creek–Moore tornado forms ===
At 6:23 p.m. CDT, a ninth tornado associated with supercell "A" began about two miles (3.2 km) south-southwest of Amber. The tornado rapidly intensified and grew in size as it crossed Oklahoma State Highway 92, attaining F4 strength about 4 miles (6.4 km) east-northeast of Amber. It quickly grew into a wedge tornado, varying between one-quarter and one mile (0.40 and 1.61 km) in width at various points throughout the track. Damage consistent with this rating was sustained over the following 6.5 miles (10.5 km) of the path before striking Bridge Creek. There, it attained the highest-possible rating on the Fujita Scale, F5. As it passed just to the north and east of Interstate 44 near the Oklahoma State Highway 4 interchange, a mobile Doppler On Wheels (DOW) radar operated by the University of Oklahoma’s Mobile Radar Research Lab – now the Flexible Array of Radars and Mesonets (FARM) – that was traveling northeast and observing the tornado from the south, initially recorded winds of 301 mph (484 km/h) within the tornado at 6:54 p.m. CDT – subsequent reanalysis in 2021 revised this value to 321 mph (517 km/h), the highest wind speed ever recorded within a tornado.

Damage in Bridge Creek was extreme, as many homes were swept away completely, leaving only concrete slabs where the structures once stood. Damage surveyors noted that the remaining structural debris from some of the homes in this area was finely granulated into small fragments, and that trees and shrubs were completely debarked. A few of these homes were bolted to their foundations. Approximately 200 houses and mobile homes were destroyed, and hundreds of other structures were damaged. The Ridgecrest Baptist Church in Bridge Creek was also destroyed in the process. Extensive ground scouring occurred, and vehicles were thrown hundreds of yards from where they originated, including a mangled pickup truck that was found wrapped around a telephone pole. About one inch (25 mm) of asphalt was scoured off one road.

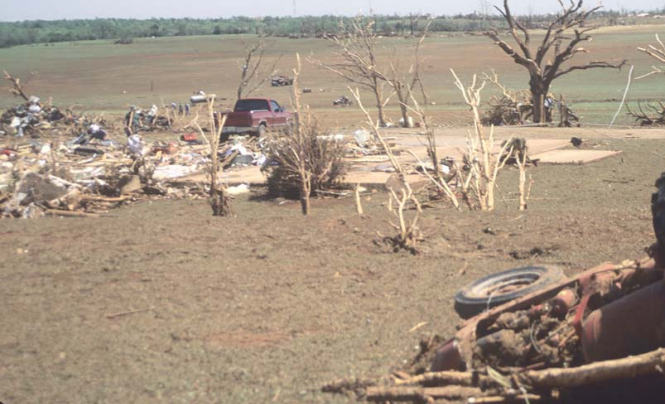
The foundation of a house in Bridge Creek that was completely destroyed at F5 intensity, with notable ground scouring and debarking of trees

Twelve people died in Bridge Creek, nine of whom were in mobile homes; all fatalities and the majority of injuries were concentrated in the Willow Lake and Southern Hills Additions and Bridge Creek Estates, consisting mostly of mobile homes. Over 39 people were injured in the area as well. Continuing northeastward, the tornado briefly weakened to F4 status before re-strengthening to F5 intensity as it neared the Grady-McClain County line, where a car was thrown roughly 0.25 mi (0.40 km) in the air, and a well-built home with anchor bolts was reduced to a bare slab. At this time, it had attained a width of one mile (1.6 km), having grown to its largest width after crossing the South Canadian River into the southern Oklahoma City limits. The tornado then became quickly rain-wrapped; Jim Gardner, then-helicopter pilot for KFOR-TV, reported during the station's live coverage of the storm that the tornado was at least one mile wide, and was embedded (or "rain-wrapped") in the precipitation core associated with the main circulation, making it difficult to see.

As it was becoming clear that a particularly violent tornado was moving into some of the most densely populated areas of central Oklahoma, around 6:57 p.m. CDT, NWS Norman issued the first-ever tornado emergency for southern portions of the Oklahoma City metropolitan area. David Andra, a meteorologist at the NWS Norman office, said that, in drafting the enhanced warning, he wanted to "paint the picture [to residents] that a rare and deadly tornado was imminent in the metro area."

SEVERE WEATHER STATEMENT
NATIONAL WEATHER SERVICE NORMAN OK
657 PM CDT MON MAY 3 1999

...TORNADO EMERGENCY IN SOUTH OKLAHOMA CITY METRO AREA...

AT 657 PM CDT...A LARGE TORNADO WAS MOVING ALONG INTERSTATE 44 WEST OF NEWCASTLE. ON ITS PRESENT PATH...THIS LARGE...DAMAGING TORNADO WILL ENTER SOUTHWEST SECTIONS OF THE OKLAHOMA CITY METRO AREA BETWEEN 715 PM AND 730 PM. PERSONS IN MOORE AND SOUTH OKLAHOMA CITY SHOULD TAKE IMMEDIATE TORNADO PRECAUTIONS.

THIS IS AN EXTREMELY DANGEROUS AND LIFE THREATENING SITUATION. IF YOU ARE IN THE PATH OF THIS LARGE AND DESTRUCTIVE TORNADO...TAKE COVER IMMEDIATELY.

DOPPLER RADAR HAS INDICATED THIS STORM MAY CONTAIN DESTRUCTIVE HAIL TO THE SIZE OF BASEBALLS...OR LARGER.

For its initial usage, the enhanced wording was released as part of a standalone Severe Weather Statement (SAME code: SVS), which were (and still are) normally meant to update the public on an existing tornado warning or severe thunderstorm warning. For tornado warnings, the SVS provides updated information on the approximate location of the storm's base-level rotation or, if it occurred after the initial warning was issued, a tornado reported by the public, civil defense personnel or storm spotters, or with the later advent of dual-polarization radar in the early 2010s, verified by the observance of a tornado debris signature. (In future issuances, tornado emergencies were issued within either the initial tornado warning issuance or an SVS providing updated information on a tornado warning already in effect.) Two minutes later, at 6:59 p.m. CDT, the SPC issued a Particularly Dangerous Situation tornado watch for much of the central third of Oklahoma, effective from 7:15 p.m. until midnight CDT on the early morning of May 4; the SPC watch product discussion noted that the extreme instability compensated for "somewhat marginal" wind shear to enhance the threat of strong to violent tornadoes.

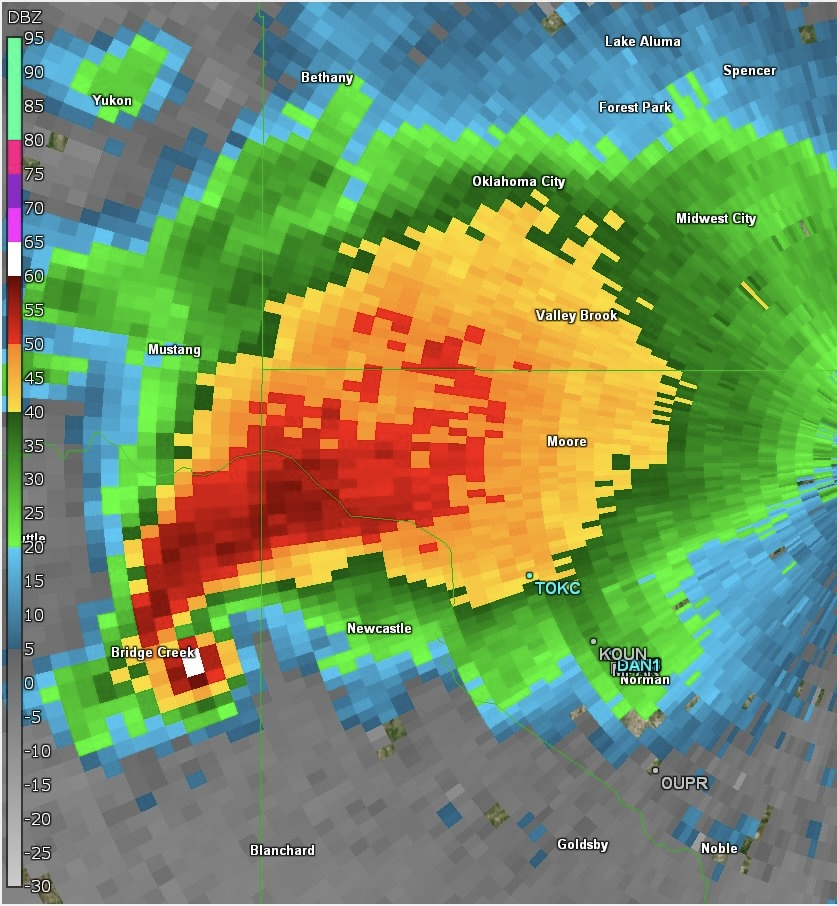
NEXRAD radar image of the tornado with a debris ball evident, as it approached the city of Moore

Paralleling I-44, the tornado narrowed as it moved into McClain County, where it crossed the highway twice at F4 intensity, killing a woman who was blown out from an underpass where she was attempting to seek shelter after being dragged down the embankment by the intense channeling winds; her 11-year-old son − with whom the woman vacated their stalled car nearby − survived, staying held tight onto the steel girders of the overpass. A man who helped the mother and son up the overpass suffered severe injuries to his leg, which was partially sliced by a highway sign thrown by the winds. At 7:10 p.m. CDT, a satellite tornado touched down over an open field north of Newcastle; it was rated as an F0 due to lack of damage. In McClain County, 38 homes and 2 businesses were destroyed, some of which were leveled at F4 intensity, were flattened; seventeen people were injured.

=== Tornado enters Moore ===
After crossing the Canadian River, the tornado entered Cleveland County and weakened to F2 intensity. By this time, it had entered the south side of Oklahoma City. Several minutes after entering the county, it widened and re-intensified to F4 status, and then moved directly into the city of Moore, reaching F5 intensity for a third time. Some of the most severe damage took place in Cleveland County, mainly in Moore, where 11 people were killed and 293 others were injured. The tornado caused an estimated $450 million in damage across the county. The first area impacted in Moore was the Country Place Estates subdivision, where 50 homes were destroyed and one was swept cleanly from its foundation at F5 intensity. Several vehicles were picked up and tossed nearly 0.25 mi (0.40 km) away from their previous location. According to local police, an airplane wing, believed to have been from an airport in Grady County (possibly lofted into the storm's updraft when the supercell's sixth tornado hit Chickasha Municipal Airport), was found near Country Place Estates. Then, the powerful tornado struck the densely populated Greenbriar Eastlake Estates at F5 intensity, killing three people and reducing entire rows of homes to rubble. In one instance, four adjacent homes were completely destroyed, with only concrete slabs remaining, warranting an F5 rating at that location. Three other homes in this housing division also received F5 damage, with the remaining destruction rated high-end F4. Severe debarking of trees was noted in this area. At the Emerald Springs Apartments, three more people were killed and a two-story apartment building was mostly flattened at F5 intensity.

As the tornado entered Cleveland County, NWS Norman activated emergency procedures, preparing to evacuate staff and others present at the facility in the event that the supercell should turn right, placing areas surrounding the Norman campus in the tornado's path (under NOAA protocol in situations posing a danger to personnel at local Weather Forecast Offices and related guidance centers, responsibility over the issuance of warnings and statements on the unfolding outbreak would have been transferred to the nearest NWS Forecast Office, based in Tulsa, while the SPC's forecasting responsibilities would be turned over to the 557th Weather Wing at Offutt Air Force Base). The supercell, however, continued on a northeastward track, sparing the Norman area.

Safety precautions were also enacted elsewhere in and near the storm's path; council members and citizens at Moore City Hall − where a council meeting was scheduled to be held that evening − sheltered in place in the building's first-floor restrooms, away from the multiple large-pane windows at its façade. In downtown Oklahoma City, spectators attending sporting events held that evening involving two of the city's minor league teams – a regular season Pacific Coast League baseball game between the Oklahoma RedHawks and the Memphis Redbirds (which was suspended during the second inning) and Game 2 of the Ray Miron President's Cup series between the Central Hockey League's Oklahoma City Blazers and Huntsville Channel Cats – were also evacuated to shelter in an underground storage area connected to the Southwestern Bell Bricktown Ballpark and Myriad Convention Center amid concerns that the storm would jog northward and place Oklahoma City itself in the tornado's path. Flights were grounded at Will Rogers World Airport as the northern edge of the supercell (containing hail up to 1.25 inches (3.2 cm), straight-line wind gusts up to 70 mph (110 km/h), and moderate to heavy rain) approached the area; the tornado turned right, away from southwestern parts of the city proper located within Oklahoma County, shortly before airport officials began evacuating employees and visitors at the terminals. Traffic on I-35 in southern Oklahoma City and northern Moore became backed up for several miles, as drivers evacuated from their vehicles to seek shelter under an overpass overlooking South Shields Boulevard.

Just outside the Eastlake Estates, an honors ceremony was being held at Westmoore High School at the time of the tornado. Adequate warning time allowed those at the school to seek shelter, however, and more than 400 adults and students attending the awards ceremony at the school's auditorium were moved to the main building, sheltering in reinforced hallways and bathrooms. Ultimately, Westmoore High sustained heavy damage and dozens of cars that were in the school's parking lot were tossed around, some of which were completely destroyed or thrown into nearby homes. No injuries took place at the school, though a horse was found dead between a couple of destroyed cars in this area. The tornado proceeded through additional densely populated areas of Moore shortly thereafter, where several large groups of homes were flattened in residential areas, with a mixture of high-end F4 and low-end F5 damage noted in the survey. Near Janeway Avenue, four people were killed in an area where multiple homes were completely destroyed. A woman, who took shelter with her husband and two children, was also killed when she was blown out from under the Shields overpass on I-35. The tornado weakened somewhat as it moved through the Highland Park neighborhood of Moore, but still caused widespread F3 and F4 damage.

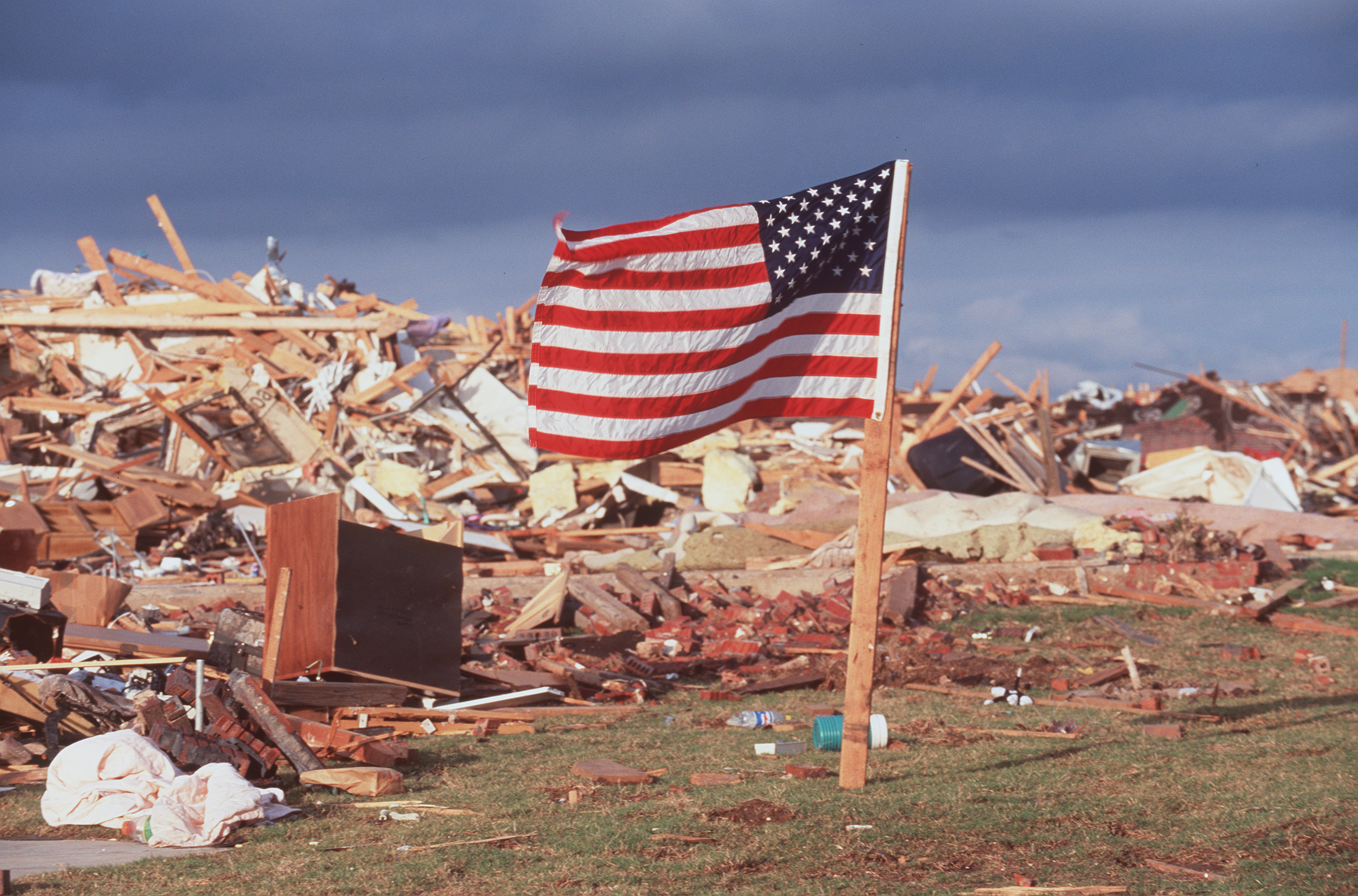
An American flag blows in the wind next to the remains of a home destroyed by the tornado.

The tornado entered Oklahoma County and struck the southeast fringes of Oklahoma City, where it re-intensified to high-end F4 strength; two people were killed in this area as a building housing a trucking company was completely destroyed. Shortly before it tracked into the county, patrons and employees at Crossroads Mall were evacuated to storage areas in the basement of the building. Numerous industrial buildings were leveled in this area of the city. A freight railroad car, weighing 36,000 pounds (16,000 kg) was thrown 0.75 miles (1.21 km). The car bounced as it traveled, remaining airborne for 50 to 100 yards (46 to 91 m) at a time. Multiple homes were also completely destroyed in southeast Oklahoma City, and one woman was killed in that area. Crossing Southeast 44th Street into Del City, the tornado moved through the highly populated Del Aire housing addition, killing six people and damaging or destroying hundreds of homes, with many sustaining F3 to F4 damage. Seven people were killed as a direct result of the tornado in Del City, and hundreds of homes were damaged or destroyed.

The tornado then crossed Sooner Road, and subsequently damaged an entry gate and several buildings at Tinker Air Force Base; it then crossed 29th Street into Midwest City, destroying one building at the Boeing Complex and damaging two others. Widespread F3/F4 damage continued as the tornado moved across I-40, affecting a large business district. Approximately 800 vehicles at Hudiburg Auto Group were damaged, located just south of I-40. Hundreds of vehicles at the dealership were moved from their original location on the lot, and dozens of vehicles (including 30 awaiting tune-ups or repairs at Morris' Auto Machine and Supply, and an unoccupied Mid-Del School District bus) were picked up and tossed northward across the interstate into several motels, being carried a distance of approximately two-tenths of a mile. Numerous motels and other businesses, including Hampton Inn, Comfort Inn, Inn Suites, Clarion Inn, Cracker Barrel, and portions of Rose State College, were destroyed. While some of the damage through this area was rated high-end F4, low-end F5 was considered. The tornado then continued into another residential area located between Southeast 15th and Reno Avenue, where three fatalities occurred. Damage consistent with high-end F4 wind speeds was inflicted to four homes in this area. Two of these homes were located between Southeast 11th and 12th Streets, near Buena Vista, and the other two homes were located on Will Rogers Road, just south of Southeast 15th. Damage then diminished rapidly to F0/F1 strength as the tornado crossed Reno Avenue, before dissipating three blocks north of Reno, between Sooner Road and Air Depot Boulevard (south of the Midwest City–Oklahoma City line). Throughout Oklahoma County, 12 people were killed and 234 others were injured while losses amounted to $450 million.

== Impact and casualties ==
Thirty-six people were killed as a direct result of the storm and five more died of indirect causes in the hours following it; most of the indirect deaths were due to heart attacks or injuries suffered while trying to seek shelter. One survivor was uninjured but committed suicide by a self-inflicted gunshot wound in an apparent reaction to losing his home in the tornado. According to the Oklahoma Department of Health, an estimated 583 people were injured by the tornado, accounting for those who did not go to the hospital or were unaccounted for. A total of 8,132 homes, 1,041 apartments, 260 businesses, eleven public buildings, and seven churches were damaged or destroyed. Estimated damage costs totaled $1.2 billion, making it the first recorded tornado to exceed $1 billion in total estimated damages.

This was the deadliest tornado recorded in Oklahoma since a long-track F5 tornado killed 107 people in Woodward on April 9, 1947. It was also the deadliest tornado ever recorded in the Oklahoma City metropolitan area; the previous record was held by an F4 tornado that affected southwestern portions of the city on June 12, 1942, which killed 31 people and caused $500,000 in damage ($14.4 million in 2025 USD when adjusted for inflation). It was the costliest tornado in U.S. history until it was surpassed by an EF4 tornado that hit Tuscaloosa and northern portions of Birmingham, Alabama, on April 27, 2011, causing an estimated $2.45 billion in damage. As of 2015, the Bridge Creek–Moore tornado is the fourth-costliest tornado, having also been surpassed by the EF5 tornadoes that hit Joplin, Missouri on May 22, 2011, and areas of Moore near the 1999 storm track on May 20, 2013. In addition, this was the 50th and final tornado in the United States to be rated F5 on the original Fujita Scale before the current Enhanced Fujita scale was implemented on February 1, 2007.

NWS researchers estimated that the death toll from the storm would likely have exceeded 600 had it not been for the advanced warning through local television and radio stations and proper safety precautions being exercised by area residents. Because Oklahoma has historically been climatologically prone to tornadic activity, Oklahoma City-area television stations KFOR-TV (channel 4), KOCO-TV (channel 5) and KWTV (channel 9) – each of which provided continuous coverage of the outbreak that spawned the Bridge Creek–Moore tornado and its ensuing aftermath from the event's start on the afternoon of May 3 through the evening of May 4 – have long relied on state-of-the-art radar technology and visual confirmation from news helicopters and in-house storm chasing fleets to cover severe weather events. The three network-affiliated stations, other local media outlets and the NWS also routinely conduct various tornado preparedness symposiums to ensure residents undertake precautions in the event a tornado or other severe weather affects their area.

== Aftermath ==
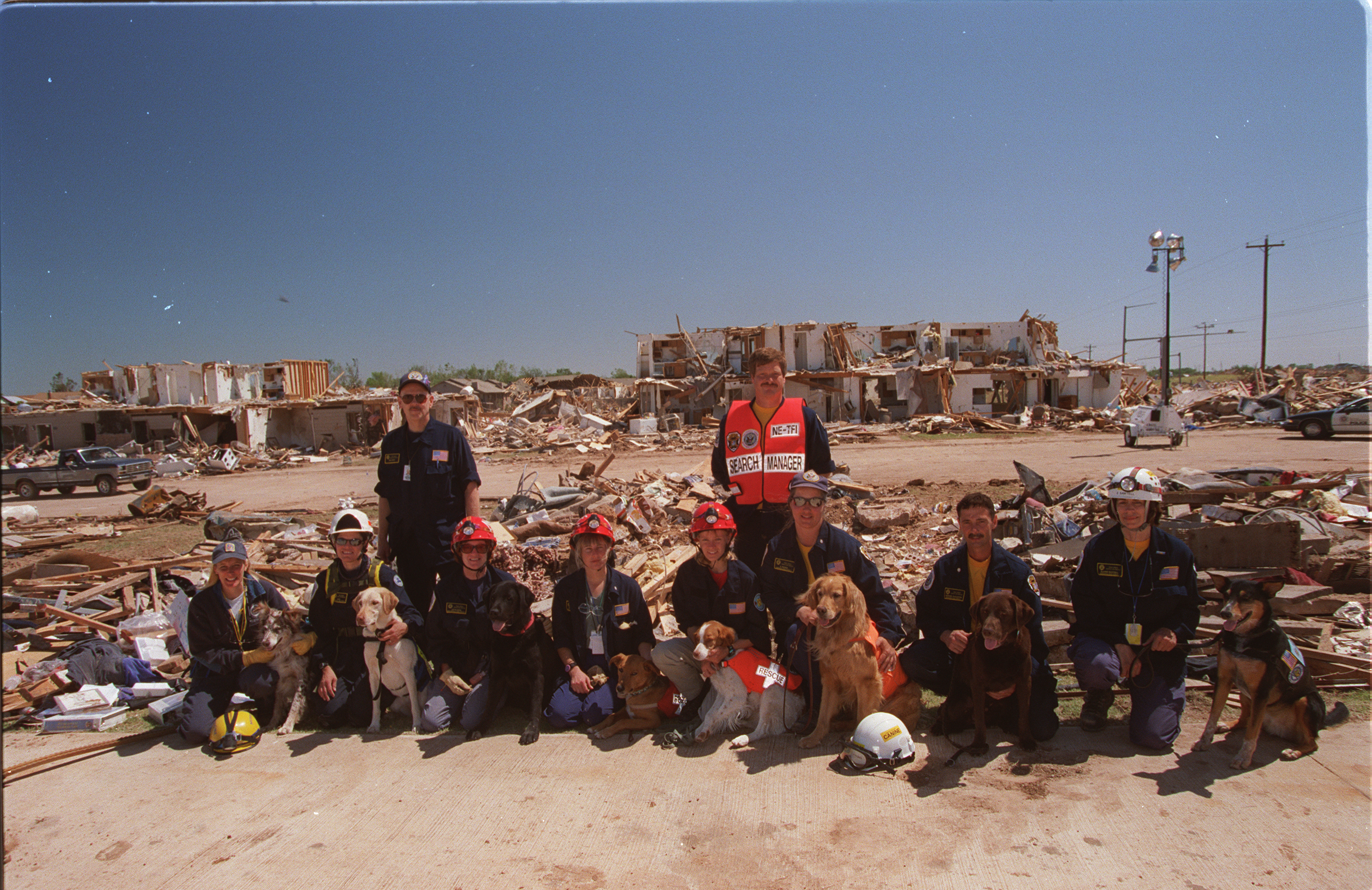
Urban search and rescue teams were deployed to help search for missing persons in the wake of the tornado.

Following the destructive and widespread tornado outbreak, President Bill Clinton signed a major disaster declaration for eleven Oklahoma counties (including the four that were affected by the Bridge Creek–Moore tornado, Cleveland, McClain, Grady and Oklahoma) on May 4. In a press statement by the Federal Emergency Management Agency (FEMA), then-director James Lee Witt stated that, "The President is deeply concerned about the tragic loss of life and destruction caused by these devastating storms." The American Red Cross opened ten shelters overnight across central Oklahoma, housing 1,600 people immediately following the disaster. By May 5, this number had lowered to 500. Throughout May 5, several post-disaster teams from FEMA were deployed to the region, including emergency response and preliminary damage assessment units. The U.S. Department of Defense deployed the 249th Engineering Battalion and placed the U.S. Army Corps of Engineers on standby for assistance. Medical and mortuary teams were also sent by the U.S. Department of Health and Human Services. By May 6, donation centers and phone banks were being established to create funds for victims of the tornadoes.

Continuing search and rescue efforts for thirteen people who were listed as missing through May 7 were assisted by urban search and rescue dogs from across the country. Nearly 1,000 members of the Oklahoma National Guard were deployed throughout the affected region. The American Red Cross had set up ten mobile feeding stations by this time and stated that 30 more were en route. On May 8, a disaster recovery center was opened in Moore for individuals recovering from the tornadoes. According to the Army Corps of Engineers, roughly 500,000 cubic yards (382,277 m^{3}) of debris was left behind and would likely take weeks to clear. Within the first few days of the disaster declaration, relief funds began being sent to families who requested aid. By May 9, roughly $180,000 had been approved by FEMA for disaster housing assistance.

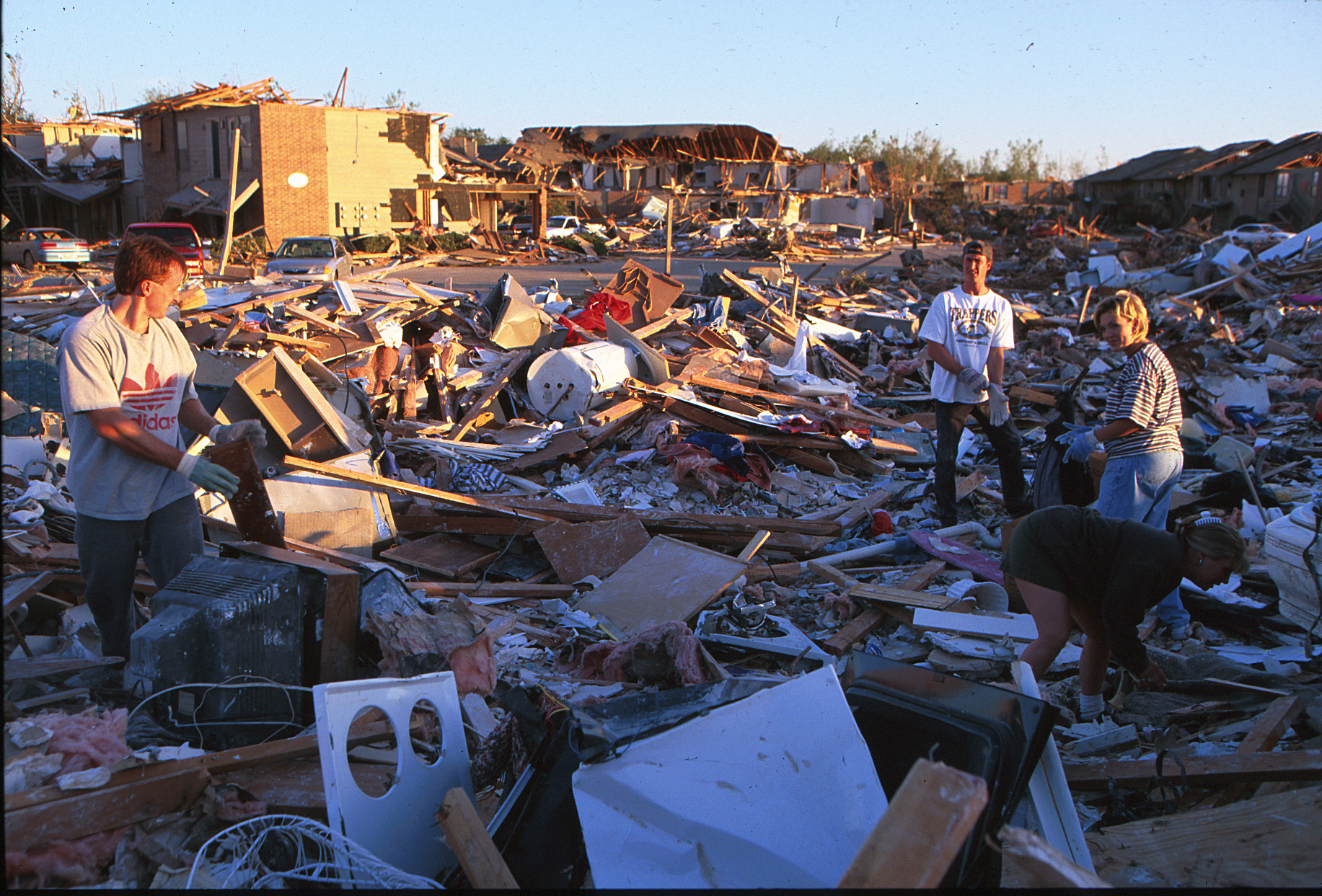
Residents search for belongings in the remains of their homes.

Debris removal finally began on May 12 as seven cleanup teams were sent to the region, more were expected to join over the following days. That day, FEMA also declared that seven counties − Canadian, Craig, Grady, Lincoln, Logan, Noble and Oklahoma − were eligible for federal financial assistance. By May 13, roughly $1.6 million in disaster funds had been approved for housing and businesses loans. This quickly rose to more than $5.9 million over the following five days. By May 21, more than 3,000 volunteers from across the country traveled to Oklahoma to help residents recover; 1,000 of these volunteers were sent to Bridge Creek to clean up debris, cut trees, sort donations and cook meals. With a $452,199 grant from FEMA, a 60-day outreach program for victims suffering tornado-related stress was set up to help them cope with trauma.

Applications for federal aid continued through June, with state approvals reaching $54 million on June 3. By this date, the Army Corps of Engineers reported that 964,170 cubic yards (737,160 m^{3}), roughly 58%, of the 1.65 million cubic yards (126 ha-m) of debris had been removed. Assistance for farmers and ranchers who suffered severe losses from the tornadoes was also available by June 3. After more than a month of being open, emergency shelters were set to be closed on June 18. On June 21, an educational road show made by FEMA visited the hardest hit areas in Oklahoma to urge residents to build storm cellars. According to FEMA, more than 9,500 residents applied for federal aid during the allocated period in the wake of the tornadoes. Most of the applicants lived in Oklahoma and Cleveland counties, 3,800 and 3,757 persons respectively. In all, disaster recovery aid for the tornadoes amounted to roughly $67.8 million by the end of July 2.

Over the following four years, a $12 million project to construct storm shelters for residents across the Oklahoma City metropolitan area was enacted. The goal was to create a safer community in a tornado-prone region. By May 2003, a total of 6,016 safe rooms were constructed. On May 9, 2003, the new initiative was put to the test as a tornado outbreak in the region spawned an F4 tornado, which took a path similar to that of the Bridge Creek–Moore tornado. Due to the higher standards for public safety, no one was killed by the 2003 tornado, a substantial improvement in just four years. On May 20, 2013, an EF5 tornado impacted some of the same areas affected by the 1999 storm, tracking through the heart of Moore. Throughout the city, 24 people were killed (along with one additional person who died as an indirect result of the tornado) and more than 230 were injured.

=== Highway overpass misconception ===
From a meteorological and safety standpoint, the tornado also brought into question the use of highway overpasses as shelters. Prior to the events on May 3, 1999, videos of people taking shelter in overpasses during tornadoes in the past – most notably one filmed near Wichita, Kansas, during the April 26, 1991, tornado outbreak involving a television news crew from Wichita NBC affiliate KSNW (channel 3), who sheltered under an overpass on the Kansas Turnpike alongside other bystanders who found themselves in the path of the tornado – gave the public misunderstanding that overpasses provided shelter from tornadoes. For nearly twenty years, meteorologists had questioned the safety of these structures; however, they lacked incidents involving loss of life. In the 1991 footage, the subjects were able to safely ride out the tornado due to an unlikely combination of events: the storm in question was a weak tornado, the tornado did not directly strike the overpass, and the overpass was of a unique design.

The May 1999 tornado outbreak proved concerns that highway overpasses were dangerous places to seek shelter during a tornado, as three overpasses were directly struck by tornadoes, with a fatality taking place at each one. Two of these were from the F5 Bridge Creek–Moore tornado while the third was from a comparatively less intense F2, which struck a rural area in Payne County, north-northeast of Oklahoma City; many other serious to life-threatening injuries also occurred at these locations. The casualties at the three overpasses are attributed to the Venturi effect, as tornadic winds were accelerated in the confined space of each of the overpasses that the tornadoes passed through, increasing the chances that those riding out the tornado would be blown out at high speeds even if they tried to anchor themselves to the girders. According to a study by the National Oceanic and Atmospheric Administration (NOAA), seeking shelter in an overpass "is to become a stationary target for flying debris."

=== Engineering flaws ===
Preliminary damage surveys conducted by a group of structural engineers from Texas Tech University determined that many of the frame homes that were destroyed by the Bridge Creek−Moore tornado were constructed below minimal residential building code standards, discovering some structural deficiencies that violated codes, which were considered to be inadequate for regions prone to tornadic activity (under federal building code standards, frame homes that were properly strapped and bolted would have withstood winds between 152 and 157 mph (245 and 253 km/h), equivalent to an F3 tornado). The team, led by meteorological researcher Charles Doswell and storm damage engineer/meteorologist Tim Marshall, determined that nails attached to a plywood roof deck in one damaged home were not properly anchored to the rafters; several homes in rural areas that were swept nearly 300 feet (91 m) from their original location did not have anchor bolts that secured the frame to their foundations, as was the case at Country Place Estates, where the homes − which left a trail of debris strewn 3,000 feet (910 m) away from their location − were attached to the concrete foundations by tapered cut nails that extended only a half-inch to the bases; many homes that were left at least partially standing also had their garage doors (mainly those made from aluminum material) collapse inward, allowing the tornado's destructive winds to enter the houses.

Marshall discovered other building and vehicle remains that became debris missiles, including a twisted 36-inch (0.91 m) steel beam, a steel leg broken off of a lawn chair that was impaled into a 5-by-5-inch (13 cm × 13 cm) post by the violent winds and a six-foot (180 cm) section of a sewer pipe that was blown into the interior hallway of one house through the front door. The team's findings also revealed that several homes were obliterated before they experienced the full impact of the vortex's peak wind velocities, with some disintegrating as the external winds surrounding the parent tornado reached speeds of F2 intensity. Three months later, as homes were being built in the damage path, Marshall found their construction to be scarcely superior to that of the homes destroyed in the May 3 storm.

The FEMA corroborated with Doswell and Marshall's findings in its Building Performance Assessment Team Report on the May 3 outbreak, noting that much of the structural damage resulted from strong winds generated by the tornado and associated windborne debris that often "produced forces on buildings not designed to withstand such forces" and in some cases, were due to improper construction techniques and "poor selection" of materials used in their construction. The report acknowledged that federal construction code requirements needed to be revised above the then-current minimum standards to allow newer buildings to better withstand higher wind speeds consistent with tornadoes of lesser intensity than the one that devastated Bridge Creek and Moore, thereby lessening the degree of damage, fatalities and injuries that are probable in buildings of typically less reinforced construction.

== In popular culture ==
The events and survivor accounts of the tornado were profiled in an episode of Discovery Channel's Critical Rescue (produced by New Dominion Pictures), aired in 2003 and NHNZ's Ultimate Disaster (Mega Disaster) on National Geographic Channel in 2006.

== See also ==
- List of North American tornadoes and tornado outbreaks
  - List of tornadoes with confirmed satellite tornadoes
- List of tornadoes in the 1999 Great Plains tornado outbreak − a chronological list of the tornadoes (as compiled in National Weather Service damage surveys and local storm reports) that occurred over the seven-day period of the outbreak from May 2 to 5, 1999
- List of Cleveland County, Oklahoma tornadoes
- List of notable media in the field of meteorology
- 1999 Mulhall tornado – An F4 tornado that struck Mulhall, Oklahoma later that night
- 1991 Red Rock tornado − A long-track and extremely violent F4 tornado that struck northern Oklahoma, which was the previous record holder for the highest wind measurements observed by radar

Preceded by Wichita Falls, TX (1979)	Costliest U.S. tornadoes on Record; May 3, 1999	Succeeded by Tuscaloosa–Birmingham, AL (2011)
