= Real Crime =

- Title card
- Also known as: Real Crime with Mark Austin
- Presented by: Mark Austin (2008–2011)
- Narrated by: Diana Weston (2001–2004); Paul McGann (2006–2007)
- Country of origin: United Kingdom
- Original language: English
- No. of series: 10
- No. of episodes: 72

Production
- Running time: 60 minutes

Original release
- Network: ITV
- Release: 6 June 2001 – 28 November 2011

Real Crime is a British documentary television series produced by ITV Studios for the ITV network. Each episode examines a notorious crime and includes interviews with relatives of the victims. It was broadcast from 2001 to 2011, and ended after ten series. From 2008 until 2011, each episode was presented by Mark Austin and from 2010 was listed as Real Crime with Mark Austin.

== Episodes ==
=== Series 1 (2001) ===
- Wednesday 6 June 10:20pm – The Hunt for Wearside Jack
- Wednesday 13 June 10:20pm – I Was a Great Train Robber
- Wednesday 20 June 10:20pm – Ben Needham: Somebody Knows
- Wednesday 27 June 10:20pm – The Rachel Nickell Story
- Wednesday 11 July 10:35pm – Who Killed the Pageant Queen? – Murder of JonBenét Ramsey
- Wednesday 5 September 10:20pm – The Gang the Krays Feared
- Wednesday 12 September 10:20pm – Suzy Lamplugh

=== Series 2 (2002) ===
- Monday 18 March 11:00pm – Kenny Noye: A Face from the Past
- Friday 12 April 11:00pm – Justice for Julie
- Tuesday 7 May 9:00pm – Crocodile Tears
- Tuesday 14 May 9:00pm – Tracie Andrews: Blood on her Hands
- Monday 24 June 10:30pm – Mr Nice Guy
- Monday 1 July 11:00pm – Starring John Bindon
- Monday 15 July 11:00pm – The Truth About the Babes in the Wood
- Monday 29 July 10:25pm – Cracking the Killers' Code
- Monday 5 August 11:00pm – The Heiress and the Kidnapper
- Monday 12 August 10:25pm – Angel of Death: The Beverly Allitt Story
- Monday 30 September 11:00pm – Britain's Richest Killer

=== Series 3 (2003) ===
- Sunday 27 April – Justice for My Daughter
- Monday 29 September 11:00pm – 'Til Death Us Do Part
- Tuesday 14 October 9:00pm – Lady Jane
- Sunday 21 December 11:20pm – A Mind to Murder

=== Series 4 (2004) ===
- Monday 5 January 11:00pm – Jeremy Bamber
- Monday 26 January 11:00pm – Love You to Death
- Monday 29 March 11:00pm – Girlsnatcher
- Tuesday 15 June 9:00pm – Who Killed the Pageant Queen?: The Prime Suspect

=== Series 5 (2006) ===
- Monday 3 July 9:00pm – Skydiver: Murder or Suicide?
- Monday 2 October 11:00pm – Married to a Monster: At Home with the M25 Rapist

=== Series 6 (2007) ===
- Tuesday 9 January 11:00pm – The Caroline Dickinson Murder
- Tuesday 16 January 11:00pm – Lady in the Lake
- Tuesday 27 February 11:00pm – The Beauty Salon Murder
- Tuesday 20 March 11:00pm – The Almost Perfect Murder
- Tuesday 27 March 11:00pm – The Perverted World of Marc Dutroux
- Tuesday 17 April 11:00pm – Killed by a Perfect Son
- Tuesday 24 April 11:00pm – A Killer Came Calling
- Tuesday 1 May 11:00pm – A Deadly Secret
- Tuesday 8 May 11:00pm – Nailing the Nail Bomber

=== Series 7 (2008) ===
- Monday 28 April 9:00pm – Murder at Harvey Nicks
- Wednesday 25 June 9:00pm – The Fight for Sarah's Law
- Monday 22 September 10:35pm – Serial Killer on Camera
- Monday 29 September 10:35pm – The 30 Year Secret
- Monday 6 October 10:35pm – The Hunt for Mr Swirl
- Thursday 16 October 9:00pm – A Very Special Constable
- Thursday 23 October 9:00pm – Death of a Hostess
- Thursday 30 October 9:00pm – The Suffolk Strangler
- Thursday 13 November 10:40pm – The Cat and Mouse Killer
- Wednesday 19 November 10:50pm – Diamond Geezers
- Thursday 27 November 10:40pm – Killer on the Run
- Thursday 4 December 10:40pm – The Angel of Death
- Thursday 11 December 9:00pm – James Bulger: A Mother's Story
- Monday 15 December 10:40pm – Death on the Bay
- Wednesday 17 December 10:40pm – The Mystery of the Missing Earl

=== Series 8 (2009) ===
- Monday 15 June 9:00pm – Rhys Jones: Caught in the Crossfire
- Monday 22 June 9:00pm – Rachel Nickell: Case Closed
- Monday 29 June 9:00pm – Sally Anne Bowman: Death on the Doorstep
- Monday 6 July 9:00pm – Hannah's Killer: Nowhere to Hide
- Thursday 23 July 10:35pm – The Man Who Didn't Cry
- Thursday 30 July 10:35pm – A Shot in the Dark
- Thursday 6 August 10:35pm – The Tesco Bomber
- Tuesday 1 December 10:35pm – Bombers on the Run

=== Series 9 (2010) ===
- Thursday 14 January 10:35pm – Tobin: Portrait of a Serial Killer
- Monday 16 August 9:00pm – Death on Duty
- Monday 23 August 9:00pm – Murder of a Father
- Thursday 2 September 9pm – Yvonne Fletcher: Justice Betrayed
- Monday 27 September 10:35pm – Bringing Down the Gooch
- Monday 4 October 10:35pm – Britain's Biggest Heist
- Monday 11 October 10:35pm – The Black Cab Rapist
- Monday 18 October 10:35pm – Gunn Law

=== Series 10 (2011) ===
- Monday 7 November 10:35pm – The Game Show Killer
- Monday 14 November 10:35pm – The Jigsaw Murder
- Monday 21 November 10:35pm – Fallen Angel
- Monday 28 November 10:35pm – Raoul Moat: Manhunt
