= Paleoworld season 2 =

Paleoworld
- Season 2
- No. of episodes: 13

Season chronology
- ← Previous; Season 1 Next → Season 3

Paleoworld (Season 2) is the second season of Paleoworld.

== List of episodes (In original order) ==
No.	Title	Original release date
1	"African Graveyard I: Hunting Dinosaurs"	30 September 1995
This episode explores African Dinosaurs. Animals Afrovenator Unnamed plant-eater dinosaur (possibly Jobaria) Spinosaurus
2	"African Graveyard II: Discovering Dinos"	7 October 1995
This episode explores African Dinosaurs. Animals Unnamed small carnivore dinosaur (possibly Deltadromeus) Unnamed large carnivore dinosaur (possibly Carcharodontosaurus)
3	"Earthshakers"	14 October 1995
This episode explores biggest land creatures that ever walked. Animals Sauropods Argentinosaurus Brachiosaurus Amphicoelias
4	"Trail of the Neanderthal"	21 October 1995
This episode explores 'Neanderthals. Animals Neanderthal Homo erectus Modern human
5	"Monsters on the Move"	28 October 1995
This episode explores the footprints of Dinosaurs. Animals Allosaurus Iguanodon Apatosaurus Unnamed Allosaurus like predator Unnamed Ornithopod Unnamed Coelurosaur
6	"Mystery of Dinosaur Cove"	4 November 1995
This episode explores Dinosaurs that lived at south pole. Animals unnamed Dromaeosaur Qantassaurus Kunbarrasaurus(unidentified) Leaellynasaura Serendipaceratops Timimus Unnamed Labyrinthodont (possibly Koolasuchus) Unnamed Allosaur (possibly Australovenator)
7	"Dinos in the Air"	18 November 1995
This episode explores the evolution of birds. Animals Archaeopteryx Protoavis Raptors Deinonychus
8	"Mammoths!"	2 December 1995
This episode explores Mammoths. Animals Columbian mammoth Miocene elephants Pygmy mammoth Woolly mammoth Clovis people Imperial mammoth Fossil Sites Featured The Mammoth Site in Hot Springs, South Dakota Santa Rosa Island
9	"Are Rhinos Dinos?"	16 December 1995
This episode explores natural history of rhinos. Animals Triceratops Arsinotherium Brontotheres Hyrachyus Paraceratherium Menoceras Teleoceras Elasmotherium
10	"Killer Birds"	6 January 1996
This episode explores killer birds. Animals Archaeopteryx Phorusrhacids Andalgalornis Titanis Megatherium Glyptodon Diadiaphorus Argentavis
11	"Island of the Giant Rats"	10 February 1996
This episode explores a gigantic rat. Animals Amblyrhiza
12	"The Land That Time Forgot"	1 March 1996
This episode explores the land before Dinosaurs, Mammal-like reptiles. Animals Dinocephalian Rhachiocephalus Gorgonopsian Dicynodonts Cistecephalus Lystrosaurus Temnospondyli (identified as primitive amphibian) Euparkeria Fossil Sites Karoo Basin Lystrosaurus Zone
13	"Troodon: Dinosaur Genius"	9 March 1996
This episode explores Troodon. Animals Troodon Tyrannosaurus Stegosaurus Edmontosaurus Fossil Sites Lance Formation identified as Dragon's Grave
