= Critical Rescue =

American docudrama television series

- Genre: Docudrama
- Narrated by: Jim Cissell
- Country of origin: United States
- Original language: English
- No. of seasons: 1
- No. of episodes: 14

Production
- Executive producer: Tom Naughton
- Producer: Tom Naughton
- Running time: 50 minutes
- Production company: New Dominion Pictures

Original release
- Network: Discovery Channel
- Release: February 6 – August 28, 2003

Critical Rescue is an American docudrama television series that is produced by New Dominion Pictures and ran on the Discovery Channel from February 6, 2003 to August 28, 2003. The series is streaming on The Roku Channel, Fawesome, FilmRise (due to Radial Entertainment's acquisition of New Dominion Pictures library in 2026), Vix (in Spanish-dubbed version under the title Zona de Peligro), Tubi, Pluto TV and Amazon Prime Video.

== Episodes ==
No.	Title	Original release date	Prod. code
1	"Officer Down"	February 6, 2003	001
The North Hollywood shootout.
2	"Ominous Warning"	February 13, 2003	002
Rescuers of the 1989 Loma Prieta earthquake in San Francisco Bay Area.
3	"Fateful Journey"	February 20, 2003	003
Rescuers of a train collision in California in April 2002.
4	"Buried Alive"	May 1, 2003	004
Trench collapses at a construction site in Brandon, Florida in 1998.
5	"Race Against Time"	March 13, 2003	005
Rescuers of the incident during Independence Day on July 4, 2001 in Middle Bass Island in Ohio.
6	"When Seconds Count"	March 20, 2003	006
Rescuers of the elevator explosion in Haysville, Kansas in 1998.
7	"Submerged"	March 27, 2003	007
Rescuers of a snowstorm in Vermont in 1997.
8	"F-5"	April 10, 2003	008
Rescuers of the 1999 Bridge Creek–Moore tornado in Oklahoma on May 3, 1999.
9	"Thin Ice"	April 17, 2003	009
Rescuers of a snowstorm in Rhode Island in 1995.
10	"Heroes on the Potomac"	May 29, 2003	010
Rescuers of the Air Florida Flight 90 plane crash during a blizzard in 1982.
11	"Trapped"	June 5, 2003	011
Survivors of the Sunshine Mine fire in Idaho in 1972.
12	"Camille's Wrath"	June 12, 2003	012
Survivors of Hurricane Camille in 1969.
13	"Swept Away"	June 26, 2003	013
Rescuers of a flood in Texas in October 1998.
14	"Firestorm"	August 28, 2003	014
Rescuers of the Oakland firestorm of 1991 in Oakland, California.

== See also ==
- Rescue 911 - a similar television series that ran from 1989 until 1996.
- Live Rescue - a similar television series that ran from 2019 until present.
- 24 Hours in A&E - a similar television series in the United Kingdom that ran from 2011 until present.
