= Murders of Rachel and Lillian Entwistle =

British murderer (born 1978)

Neil Entwistle
- Born: 18 September 1978 (age 48); Nottinghamshire, England, UK
- Occupation: Computer programmer
- Spouse: Rachel Souza (m. 2003; died 2006)
- Children: 1
- Parent(s): Clifford and Yvonne Entwistle
- Status: Incarcerated
- Conviction: Two counts of first degree murder
- Penalty: Life imprisonment

Details
- Victims: Rachel Souza; Lillian Entwistle
- Date: 20 January 2006
- Country: United States
- Location: Hopkinton, Massachusetts
- Weapon: .22
- Date apprehended: 8 February 2006
- Imprisoned at: Old Colony Correctional Center

Neil Entwistle (born 18 September 1978) is an English man convicted of murdering his American wife, Rachel, and their infant daughter, Lillian, on 20 January 2006, in Hopkinton, Massachusetts, United States. He was sentenced to life imprisonment without parole and is incarcerated at Old Colony Correctional Center in Bridgewater, Massachusetts.

== Background ==
Neil Entwistle was born in Worksop near Nottingham and attended the University of York, receiving a master's degree in electronic engineering. He grew up in Worksop with his parents, Clifford and Yvonne, and his younger brother Russell. Entwistle's home was working class; his father was a coal miner and his mother was a cook at a school canteen.

While at university, Entwistle met Rachel Souza, an American who was studying abroad. They married on 23 August 2003, in Plymouth. The couple moved to Worcestershire, where their daughter Lillian was born on 9 April 2005. Entwistle worked in computing and his wife as a teacher of English, Drama and Theatre Studies at St. Augustine's Catholic High School in Redditch. After migrating to the US, the couple stayed with Rachel's mother and stepfather, Joseph and Priscilla Matterazzo, in Carver, Massachusetts, before finding a house of their own in Hopkinton, located 26 miles (42 kilometers) west of Boston.

== Murders ==
The bodies of 27-year-old Rachel and 9-month-old Lillian were found on 22 January 2006 in the master bedroom of the family's rented home, where they had been living for ten days. Autopsy results showed that Rachel died of a gunshot wound to the head and Lillian of a gunshot wound to the torso. The bullet that passed through Lillian also pierced Rachel's left breast. The bullets were so small that the one in Rachel's head went undetected until the autopsy.

Hours after the deaths of his wife and daughter, Entwistle purchased a one-way ticket to London at about 5:00 a.m. (EST) on 21 January and boarded a British Airways flight that departed Boston at 8:15 a.m. His speedy departure from the crime scene was not the only reason he raised suspicion: Entwistle's DNA was found on the handle of the same .22 caliber handgun owned by his father-in-law, Joseph Materazzo, that he told authorities he had used only once, months earlier, while practising at Materazzo's shooting club. DNA matching that of his wife was found on the gun's muzzle. A set of keys to Materazzo's house were found in the car Entwistle left at Boston's Logan International Airport.

A search of Entwistle's computer revealed that days before the murders, he had viewed a website that described "how to kill people" and searched for escort services. Contrary to outward appearances, Entwistle had been unemployed since September 2005 and was indebted at the time of the murders. Though he claimed an income of $10,000 per month from an "offshore account" set up by his previous employer in the UK, Entwistle had no such income or account. He was also more than $30,000 in credit card debt and was under investigation by eBay for numerous fraudulent transactions. Authorities suspected a financial motivation for the murders.

== Investigation and evidence ==
On the evening of 21 January, the day after the murders are believed to have been committed, police officers visited the Entwistles' home after Rachel's friend reported her missing. Though the police conducted a cursory inspection of the house, they failed to notice Rachel's and Lillian's bodies, obscured under a pile of bedding in the master bedroom. A second and more thorough search the following evening discovered their bodies.

On 23 January, a Massachusetts State Police trooper called Entwistle at his parents' home in Worksop. The call lasted two hours and was recorded. Entwistle told the trooper that, on the morning of the murders, he had left his Hopkinton home at around 9:00 a.m. (EST) to run an errand and that his wife and daughter had both been alive and well, in the bed in the couple's master bedroom. He claimed that when he returned, at around 11:00 a.m., he found both had been shot dead, and had no idea who had killed them. Entwistle covered their bodies with a blanket and did not alert authorities. Entwistle claimed that he was so distraught upon seeing the corpses of his wife and daughter that he decided to kill himself. However, because he was unable to bring himself to end his life with a knife, he drove the family car to the Materazzos' house to get a .22 caliber revolver. Finding the house locked, he told police that he decided to fly home to England to see his parents.

Police subsequently named Entwistle as a person of interest in the investigation, and later issued an international arrest warrant. On 9 February 2006, Entwistle was arrested on a London Underground train at Royal Oak station following a detailed search of his parents' house. After an initial request that he not be sent back to the US, he later agreed to be extradited. Middlesex County district attorney Martha Coakley (who had successfully prosecuted British au pair Louise Woodward in 1997) told a press conference after Entwistle's arrest:

On Thursday night [19 January 2006], Rachel was alive and had spoken with family members.

At some time on Friday morning, Neil Entwistle — with a firearm we believe he had secured at sometime before that from father-in-law Joseph Materazzo — shot Rachel Entwistle in the head and then proceeded to shoot baby Lillian, who was lying on the bed next to her mother.

We believe possibly this was intended to be a murder-suicide, but we cannot confirm that. Obviously the murder was effected, but the suicide was not.

What we believe happened next was that Neil Entwistle returned the gun to his father-in-law's home in Carver, then made preparations to leave the country. As we know, he was observed at Logan International Airport.

He purchased a one-way ticket on British Airways at approximately 5:00 a.m. on Saturday morning, 22 January. He was on an 8:15 a.m. flight to the United Kingdom on that day. Based upon forensic information late Tuesday afternoon that linked the .22 handgun owned by Joseph Materazzo both to Neil Entwistle and to Rachel, we believed we had probable cause to seek an arrest warrant for Neil Entwistle's arrest.

== Arrest and events prior to trial ==
Rachel and Lillian were buried in Evergreen Cemetery in Kingston, Massachusetts, with the surname Souza on their graves. They were buried in a single coffin.

On 8 February 2006, a week after their funerals, Entwistle was arrested by the extradition unit of London's Metropolitan Police at his parents house in Worksop, Nottinghamshire. He eventually waived his right to contest the extradition order and was returned to the U.S. on 15 February where he was arraigned at Framingham District Court and ordered to be held without bail at Middlesex County jail in Cambridge. On 28 March, Entwistle was indicted on two counts of murder, the illegal possession of a firearm, and the illegal possession of ammunition. He pleaded not guilty. In December 2006, nearly a year after the murders, officers at the Middlesex County jail found letters from Entwistle to his parents and his legal team which indicated he was depressed and might be contemplating suicide. As a result, he was transferred to Bridgewater State Hospital for mental evaluation before being returned to Middlesex County. Forensic psychiatrist Christopher Cordess believed Asperger syndrome explained Entwistle's behavior, and Dr. David Holmes concurred.

After numerous delays, the Middlesex superior court began juror selection in June 2008. There were concerns that, due to the high-profile nature of the case, Entwistle would not receive a fair trial. Some media reported that potential jurors were indicating that they had already formed significant views on his guilt.

== Trial and conviction ==
Entwistle's trial for double murder began on 2 June 2008 in Woburn, Massachusetts. His legal team, led by Elliot Weinstein, unsuccessfully fought proposals by the prosecution to use DNA evidence. He also unsuccessfully fought to suppress other evidence found in the family home, due to the lack of a warrant. Entwistle called no witnesses, nor did he testify in his own defense.

Entwistle was found guilty of all charges on 25 June 2008 and sentenced to life imprisonment without the possibility of parole, the mandatory sentence for first degree murder in the state of Massachusetts. Judge Diane Kottmyer made it clear that this was a whole life sentence, subject only to a governor's pardon or successful appeal. Kottmyer imposed two life sentences on the murder charges and ten years of probation on the firearms and ammunition charges, all to run concurrently, and the condition that he never profit from the sale of his story.

Entwistle was first incarcerated at the Souza-Baranowski Correctional Center. In August 2008, he was tricked into shaving his head in an attempt to secure the protection of a white supremacist prison gang. Instead of giving him protection, the gang had reportedly said: "It's a nice gesture on your part but we're gonna kill you." Entwistle was put into protective custody (i.e., Administrative Segregation or "AdSeg") as a result, and in December, he was transferred to Old Colony Correctional Center, a medium security prison in Bridgewater. The Department of Corrections confirmed that Entwistle's transfer was for his own safety, and that the threats against his life were quite serious.

== Aftermath and appeals ==
Entwistle's conviction was automatically appealed to the Massachusetts Supreme Judicial Court. He arranged for a new lawyer to represent him in his appeal, since his original lawyer, Weinstein, was diagnosed with pancreatic cancer and dropped the case to focus on recovery. On appeal, Entwistle argued that the searches of the family home were carried out without warrants and the evidence seized as a result should have been suppressed during the trial. The appeal was rejected in August 2012. The U.S. Supreme Court declined to hear the case in January 2013. Entwistle has thus exhausted all of his appeals.

In October 2008, Entwistle's parents filed a complaint of harassment with the UK Press Complaints Commission (PCC) against their local newspaper, the Worksop Guardian; the complaint was rejected. His parents continue to insist that their son is innocent of the murders, that Rachel was the true killer and that he will eventually be cleared and released from prison. Entwistle's mother said after the trial: "The evidence points to Rachel murdering our grandchild and then committing suicide".

== Media ==
In 2008, a book titled Heartless: The True Story of Neil Entwistle and the Cold Blooded Murder of His Wife and Child, was released by author Michele R. McPhee.

In December 2012, the British broadcaster Channel Five aired an Entwistle documentary entitled The Man Who Didn't Cry.

== See also ==
- Crime in Massachusetts
- Sharpe family murders
- Charles Stuart (murderer)
- Murder of Laci Peterson
- Watts family homicides
- Federico murder case
