= Murder of Sally Anne Bowman =

English murder case

Sally Anne Bowman
- Born: 11 September 1987; Carshalton, London, England
- Died: 25 September 2005 (aged 18); Croydon, London, England
- Cause of death: Murder (stab wounds)
- Education: BRIT School
- Occupation: Model
- Known for: Murder victim

Sally Anne Bowman (11 September 1987 – 25 September 2005) was an English hairdresser and model who was murdered in the early hours of 25 September 2005 in Croydon, London. 18 year-old Bowman had been robbed, raped and repeatedly stabbed. Mark Dixie, who had a history of robbery and sexual offences, was convicted of the murder and sentenced to life imprisonment with a recommended minimum of 34 years.

== Life and career ==
Sally Anne Bowman was born on 11 September 1987 in Carshalton, South London, the youngest of four daughters born to Linda Bowman and daughter of Paul Bowman, who later divorced. She attended the BRIT School for Performing Arts and Technology in Croydon. Six-foot-tall Bowman had dreams of one day appearing on the cover of Vogue and had been compared to supermodel Kate Moss. After leaving school in 2004, she worked part-time as a hairdresser and model. In January 2005, she joined Pulse Model Management, a local modelling agency. She became the face of Swatch watches, and took part in the Swatch Alternative Fashion Week in April 2005.

== Murder ==
At 22:00 on 24 September 2005, Bowman, her older sister Nicole, and a group of friends went to Lloyd's Bar in Croydon, where they stayed until 01:00. After leaving the bar, Bowman waited outside for fifteen minutes before being taken to a friend's house by taxi.

She contacted her ex-boyfriend, Lewis Sproston, and he agreed to pick her up and take her home after she told him Nicole had been arrested for fighting. She took a taxi back into Croydon town centre, where Sproston picked her up at around 02:20 and drove her to her house at 25 Blenheim Crescent. Whilst in the car, Bowman and Sproston had a quarrel, each accusing the other of infidelity, which had contributed to their recent split.

Shortly after 04:00, Bowman left the car and Sproston drove off. Minutes later, Bowman was stabbed in the neck and stomach, and was then raped as she lay dead or dying. Her handbag, cardigan, underwear and mobile phone were stolen. Police initially treated Sproston as a suspect, and he was subsequently arrested. After being held for four days, DNA evidence eliminated him as a suspect and he was released without charge.

== Investigation and trial ==
On 28 June 2006, 35-year-old Croydon man Mark Dixie was arrested on suspicion of murdering Bowman. He was charged with Bowman's murder and remanded in custody to await trial. This development came after police discovered a DNA link to the murder, having taken a DNA swab from Dixie when they arrested him two weeks earlier for allegedly being involved in a brawl at the pub where he was working as a chef.

After more than eighteen months on remand, Dixie went on trial at the Old Bailey in the City of London on 4 February 2008, charged with the murder of Sally Anne Bowman. He admitted to raping her after finding her on the ground outside her home, but denied murdering her; and said that he did not realize she was dead or dying when he found her.

Dixie was found guilty of Bowman's murder by a unanimous verdict on 22 February 2008 after three hours of jury deliberation. At the Old Bailey later that day, Judge Gerald Gordon sentenced Dixie to life imprisonment with a minimum term of 34 years, meaning that he is unlikely to be considered for parole until at least 2040, when he will be seventy years of age. It was subsequently revealed that Dixie was already a convicted serial sex offender.

== Calls for a national DNA register ==
Following Dixie's murder conviction, Detective Superintendent Stuart Cundy, who had led the Bowman investigation, said: "It is my opinion that a national DNA register—with all its appropriate safeguards—could have identified Bowman's murderer within 24 hours. Instead it took nearly nine months before Mark Dixie was identified, and almost two-and-a-half years for justice to be done."

The calls for such a register were, however, turned down by ministers and other politicians who claimed that it would raise practical as well as civil liberties issues. Linda Bowman, Sally Anne's mother, has continued to call for a national DNA register to be introduced.

A documentary about the murder was broadcast on BBC One on 8 April 2008. Another TV documentary, as part of ITV's Real Crime series documented Bowman's killing, with interviews, the history of the case and reconstructions included, aired on 29 June 2009.

== Aftermath ==
On 11 September 2008, a memorial was held to mark what would have been Bowman's 21st birthday. Balloons were released in Central Croydon outside Primark in North End. In August 2017, Bowman's family revealed that her ashes had been exhumed four years previously as her grave had been repeatedly targeted by vandals.

== See also ==
- Murder of Eve Stratford, unsolved 1975 murder in London of another young model
- David Smith, another British killer and multiple rapist
