= Albert Johnson Walker =

Canadian criminal

- Born: August 9, 1946 (age 80); Paris, Ontario, Canada
- Other names: David W. Davis, Ronald Joseph Platt, The Rolex Killer
- Occupations: Financial planner, mortgage broker
- Spouse: Barbara Walker
- Children: 4
- Status: Incarcerated - BC Prison
- Criminal charges: Murder; Theft; Embezzlement
- Penalty: Life imprisonment (murder); 4 years (embezzlement)

Albert Johnson Walker (born 1946), also known as The Rolex Killer, is a Canadian criminal serving a prison term for embezzlement and murder. He is known for murdering an Englishman whose identity he had been assuming, and for posing for years as though his own daughter were his wife.

== Early life ==
Originally from Paris, Ontario, Walker was a high school drop-out. After doing numerous odd jobs, he was eventually hired as a bank teller for a trust company. He also started filing other people's income tax returns. Walker quit his job at the trust company some two years later to establish his own freelance bookkeeping business, "Walker Financial Services Incorporated."

== Walker Financial ==
In over a decade, Walker Financial grew into a six-branch operation with about thirty employees. In 1986, a stock deal that Walker had invested in collapsed.

As a mortgage broker and financier, by 1990 Walker had defrauded about seventy Canadian clients of CA$3.2 million (equivalent to $6.7 million in 2025). That year, he fled to Europe with his 15-year-old daughter, the second oldest of his four children with his ex-wife, Barbara. In 1993, Walker was charged in Canada with 18 counts of fraud, theft and money laundering. Over a period of time, Walker became Canada's most wanted criminal and the fourth most wanted by Interpol.

== Time in England ==
Walker eventually made his way to Harrogate in North Yorkshire where he lived with his daughter, who neighbours believed was his wife. During this time, that daughter had two children, the paternity of whom has not been revealed. He changed his name to David Davis and began a business career with television repairman Ronald Joseph Platt.

Platt, raised in Canada, wished to return to his home country. Walker bankrolled this trip, but claimed he needed Platt's driving licence, signature stamp and birth certificate for the business. When Platt left for Canada in 1992, initially with the intent of permanently settling there, Walker assumed his identity.

== Murder and conviction ==
Platt ran out of money in Canada and returned to England in 1995. Walker took Platt out on a fishing trip on 20 July 1996 and murdered him, weighed him down with an anchor, and dumped his body in the sea. Two weeks later the body was discovered in the English Channel by fisherman John Copik with a Rolex wristwatch being the only identifiable object on the body. Since the Rolex movement had a serial number and was engraved with special markings every time it was serviced, British police traced the service records from Rolex.

Ronald Joseph Platt was identified as the owner of the watch and the victim of the murder. In addition British police were able to determine the date of death by examining the date on the watch calendar and since the Rolex movement had a reserve of two to three days of operation when inactive and it was fully waterproof, they were able to determine the time of death within a small margin of error. Walker was apprehended approximately two months later.

In the spring of 1998, Walker's preliminary hearing was held in the magistrates court in Teignmouth, Devon, England. On 27 April 1998, Walker pleaded not guilty in his murder trial in the English city of Exeter. He was found guilty in 1998 and received an automatic life sentence for murder. Had Walker not been convicted, the Foreign and Commonwealth Office would have transferred him back to Canada to face his fraud charges.

== Transfer to Canada ==
On 22 February 2005, The Globe and Mail reported that Walker would be transferred to a Canadian prison, where he faced additional charges of fraud, theft and money laundering.

On 23 July 2007, Walker was sentenced in Kingston, Ontario, to four years for fraud and one year concurrent for violations of the Bankruptcy and Insolvency Act. He started serving his life sentence in Canada at Kingston Penitentiary. When that prison was permanently closed in 2013 he was transferred to a prison in the Canadian province of British Columbia.

== Parole ==
In June 2023, after 26 years of incarceration, then-77-year-old Walker was granted a temporary day parole for 60 days; the program tests a prisoner's ability to follow the conditions of the parole, including a strict curfew, and examines how they start their reintegration to society. The test period included Walker being barred from working in the financial industry and from contacting his ex-wife or children, nor his victims.

In February 2024, Walker was denied ongoing day parole, despite a recommendation by Correctional Services Canada, because the Parole Board of Canada said there were "...concerns with how you presented the index offences to your community parole officer while on day parole.”

== Media ==
In 1998, two books were published detailing the story of Albert Walker. Toronto Star journalist Bill Schiller wrote A Hand in the Water: The Many Lies of Albert Walker, while Toronto Sun journalist Alan Cairns wrote Nothing Sacred: The Many Lives and Betrayals of Albert Walker.

In 2000, the episode "Time Will Tell", of the series Forensic Files, details the investigation of Ronald Platt's murder and the capture of Albert Walker.

In 2000, a theatrical play by Peter Colley, Stolen Lives, The Albert Walker Story, was performed at the Blyth Festival in Blyth, Ontario.

The 2002 made-for-TV movie, AKA Albert Walker, documents Walker's crimes and eventual arrest.

In 2002, Walker's ex-wife, Barb Walker, self-published a book entitled Dancing Devil: My Twenty Years with Albert Walker, detailing her life with Walker leading up to his departure from Canada with their daughter.

In 2005, the episode "Body Double", of the documentary crime series Interpol Investigates, detailed the murder investigation.

In 2007, the episode "The (Almost) Perfect Murder", of the documentary series Real Crime, examines the background behind Walker's arrest in England.

In 2010, British soap opera Coronation Street aired a storyline that bore a striking resemblance to the Albert Walker/Ronald Platt murder, in which character John Stape, after being struck off the Teaching Register for kidnapping a school girl, steals the identity of a former colleague, Colin Fishwick, to once again gain employment as a teacher. Fishwick had emigrated to Canada, allowing Stape to freely assume his identity. But Fishwick chose to return to the UK, uncovering Stape's deception and ultimately dying during a confrontation with Stape. Although Stape was not directly responsible for Fishwick's death (Fishwick had been beaten savagely by another man just days before their confrontation and had succumbed to his injuries), Stape chose not to report the death. He knew he could easily be shown to have a motive for murdering Fishwick and buried his body in a construction site instead.

In 2025, Canadian Broadcasting Corporation's (CBC) podcast "Uncover" presented this story in Season 32: Sea of Lies.
