= Interpol Investigates =

- Genre: Docudrama
- Starring: Michael Shapiro (narrator)
- Composer: Ed Smart
- Original language: English
- No. of seasons: 1
- No. of episodes: 12

Production
- Production company: New Dominion Pictures

Original release
- Network: National Geographic
- Release: August 3, 2004 – February 13, 2005

Interpol Investigates is an American docudrama television series which aired on National Geographic Channel. The program follows Interpol as its members search for the minute clues left behind by culprits.

== Episodes ==
No.	Title	Original release date
1	"The Serpent"	August 3, 2004
Discover how Interpol convicted elusive fraudster Charles Sobhraj, who preyed on Western tourists traveling in Southeast Asia during the 1970s.
2	"Body Double"	August 10, 2004
After stealing millions from his clients and colleagues, Albert Johnson Walker flees Canada, taking his daughter with him. With the help of British police, Interpol finally track him to an English village.
3	"Tracks of a Stalker"	August 17, 2004
A murderer spreads terror through Europe as he kills women through France by train. British, French, and Portuguese police have learned the name of the killer, Sid Ahmed Rezala.
4	"One-Way Ticket"	August 24, 2004
A boat carrying over 300 illegal Chinese immigrants runs aground in New York Harbor. Several died while trying to swim to safety, while others are taken in custody by INS officials. New York Police, the Coast guard, the Thai, and Hong Kong Police, and Interpol work together to put the human smuggling operation led by Sister Ping into custody.
5	"Missing Link"	September 7, 2004
An automotive repair shop explodes in Managua, killing two people. The same day, businessman Abilio Diniz is kidnapped in broad daylight. The two seemingly unrelated events are actually connected by a terrorist organization.
6	"Rising Sun"	September 14, 2004
See how Mireille Balestrazzi's relentless pursuit of art thieves led to her eventual appointment to the executive committee of Interpol itself.
7	"Deadly Traffic"	October 5, 2004
Track the Juarez drug cartel's ringleader, Amado Carrillo Fuentes, through Mexico and South America in a tale of violence, intimidation and corruption.
8	"Stealing History"	October 12, 2004
Discover how the British police, Interpol and Egyptian Antiquities Police tracked down art smuggler Jonathan Tokeley-Parry and brought him to justice.
9	"Fatal Compulsion"	October 26, 2004
Ira Einhorn killed his girlfriend in Philadelphia in the late 1970s and then vanished. Find out how Interpol finally tracked him to France.
10	"Terror in the Skies"	November 23, 2004
Follow the FBI and Interpol as they track the terrorist responsible for hijacking Egypt Air Flight 648 in 1985 after his release from a Malta prison.
11	"Lethal Obsession"	November 30, 2004
In 1985 Derek & Nancy are murdered in their Bedford County, Virginia home. Interpol tracks the killers, Jens Söring and Elizabeth Haysom across Europe & Asia to their final capture.
12	"Betrayed"	January 18, 2005
In 1985, DEA agents are arrested for selling drugs. Darnell Garcia escapes police and Interpol is brought in to capture the fugitive.
13	"Dangerous Company"	February 13, 2005
Dubbed a "modern day Bonnie and Clyde", Nova Guthrie & Craig Michael Pritchert were arrested in South Africa in 2003 after 6 luxurious years on the run from police.
