= Federico murder case =

2018 domestic homicide case in Chesterfield County, Virginia

- Motive: Domestic homicides and killing of witnesses

Details
- Date: August - December 2018
- Locations: Chesterfield County, Virginia, U.S.
- Targets: Estranged wife, wife's boyfriend, unborn child, brother, and father
- Killed: Wife's boyfriend
- Injured: Wife (paralyzed)
- Weapons: Gun, fire, contract murder

Notes
- Convicted: Josh Federico, Joseph Federico, Constantine Trikoulis Died in prison: Wendy Federico Pending sentencing: Laura Miller, Hunter Federico

The Federico murder case was a criminal case which took place in Chesterfield County, Virginia, United States, in which Josh Federico shot his wife, Sarah, killed her boyfriend Lawrence Howell, and attempted to kill her unborn child. Following his arrest, Federico conspired with family members and friends to hire someone to kill his father-in-law and brother-in-law. Five people have been implicated in these crimes.

== Background ==
Josh Federico was a regional sales manager for Commonwealth Home Care, working in Richmond, Virginia. His wife, Sarah, owned and operated a small horse farm, Blackwater Stables, in Chesterfield County. The Federicos, who had been married for six years, separated four months prior to the shooting. Sarah moved out of the family home and filed a protective order against her estranged husband, alleging that Josh had engaged in extreme cruelty and had caused her to crash her car into a tree as the two fought for possession of her cell phone. Josh filed for divorce June 12, 2018, claiming Sarah had committed adultery on multiple occasions with three different men.

Prior to leaving Josh, Sarah had met Lawrence Howell the previous April. Howell left his 3-year-old son and girlfriend in Florida to move in with Sarah in her new home in Chesterfield County; Howell had two other children from a previous marriage and was the father of the unborn child involved in the shooting. The home Sarah shared with Howell was broken into earlier in the same month of the shooting, with her safe, computers and gun being stolen.

== Multiple attempted murders ==
In the early morning hours of August 24, 2018, Sarah Federico was shot multiple times, critically wounding her and her unborn child. The following day, the incinerated remains of Howell were found in a fire pit on the lot adjacent to Josh's home. Sarah identified Josh as her attacker.

At trial, Sarah testified that Josh, from whom she had been separated for several months, fatally shot Howell after he took their dogs outside early on the morning of the shooting. Frightened by the gunfire but still not clear as to what was happening, Sarah witnessed Howell stumbling inside the house and collapsing behind the living room couch. At that point, she looked for her gun but it wasn’t in the drawer where she usually kept it.

With her husband now in the house, and dressed in black, she ran to a first-floor bathroom and tried escaping out of a window, but couldn’t get it open. Federico burst in and shot her in the arm; she collapsed on the floor. Sarah testified that her husband then directed her into the hallway, saying “he was going to make it look like Larry and I were fighting.” Wounded, she went out on the front porch with Josh following. Scared about what might come next, Sarah didn’t try to flee as Josh began cleaning up the bloody scene with paper towels and bleach. At one point, Josh directed Sarah to scratch her dead boyfriend’s face to make it appear they had been fighting, then had her fire a gun with her left hand into some paper towels; she was right-handed and had been shot in the right arm.

Josh Federico then went upstairs for a time; when he returned he calmly dragged Howell’s body out the garage door with a tarp and put him in Sarah's GMC Yukon. Sarah Federico was in the kitchen when Josh Federico returned; he went into the living room, grabbed a pillow, and used it to silence the sound of gunfire as he shot her again — this time in the abdomen. Sarah Federico collapsed on the floor and played dead, as Josh Federico put his hand over her mouth to see if she was still breathing.

After hearing him walk toward the garage, Sarah Federico said she got up and took off running through a patch of woods and briars to the home of her nearest neighbors, Richard and Patricia Brigman. Sarah Federico realized that Josh Federico was behind her as she fled, and as she climbed the steps to her neighbors’ second-floor deck, she was shot for the third time — in the back. She was frantically banging on the back door when she was shot, and she fell over the threshold when the Brigmans, who were awakened by their barking dogs and the gunfire, opened the inner door. “She was covered in blood from head to toe,” Richard Brigman testified. As Sarah Federico moaned in pain on the floor, she told the Brigmans that her husband had shot her and killed Howell.

Howell’s remains were found days later in a burn pit on Federico’s farm where a prosecutor said he used tires to basically “cremate” the body.

== Manhunt ==
The United States Marshals Service joined forces with the local police in a three day search for Federico. A fire department medic spotted the shirtless murder suspect walking near a church and this led to an intense 3 hour, 30-man, ground search consisting of members of the Richmond Police Department SWAT team, the FBI, the Bureau of Alcohol, Tobacco and Firearms, the U.S. Marshals Service’s regional fugitive task-force, and K9 search and rescue dogs. Joshua Federico was found hiding in an abandoned home and arrested and charged with first-degree murder, malicious wounding and use of a firearm in commission of a felony. Federico's friend was also arrested and charged as an accessory after the fact to first-degree murder. Federico's son, Hunter, was arrested after police found guns and illegal drugs in his home after a manhunt related search.

== Solicitation to murder of wife, father and brother ==
Chesterfield detectives obtained a wiretap for two phone numbers belonging to Joseph Federico (Josh's brother) after they uncovered evidence that Josh Federico, along with family and friends, was plotting a murder-for-hire scheme to kill Sarah Federico, her unborn child, Edward Grove, Sr. (her father) and Edward Grove, Jr. (her brother).

Phone conversations involving Joshua Federico, Joseph Federico, Wendy Federico, and a family acquaintance Constantine Trikoulis, were recorded in which they discussed how to hire someone to carry out the murders and how much it would cost. Wendy Federico said the family should hire their own "resource" instead of working through Joshua's jail contacts, at one point saying, "If I have to do it, I will." An undercover Virginia State Police agent met with Joseph Federico in late November who told the agent that his brother was set on wiping out his wife and her family members. Law enforcement raided the home of Joshua Federico in December 2018 in connection to a murder-for-hire plot and recovered hundreds of thousands of dollars in cash that was either hidden or buried at the Federico's farm.

Federico was then charged with three counts of conspiracy to commit capital murder, solicitation to commit capital murder, attempted capital murder and two counts of felony obstruction of justice. Joseph Federico (brother), and Wendy Federico (mother) were both charged with three counts of conspiracy to commit capital murder and two counts of felony obstruction of justice. Family acquaintance Constantine Trikoulis was charged with three counts of conspiracy to commit capital murder, two counts of felony obstruction of justice and accessory after the fact to first-degree murder. Laura Miller, an acquaintance of Joshua Federico, is facing charges as an accessory to homicide after the fact.

== Trial ==
A preliminary hearing in Chesterfield General District Court was held to decide whether or not the long list of charges against the Federicos and Trikoulis should be certified to the higher court. Judge Keith Hurly certified the three conspiracy charges all three defendants faced to Chesterfield Circuit court. Judge Hurly also certified a solicitation charge leveled against Joshua and Joseph Federico connected to the plot. The judge dismissed several other charges that all three defendants faced, including attempted capital murder and obstruction of justice. All three were held without bond while their case made its way over to Chesterfield Circuit Court.

Four members of the Federico family were indicted by a Chesterfield Grand Jury:

=== Joshua Federico ===
- One count of solicitation to commit murder (felony)
- One count of attempting to commit capital murder (felony)
- Three counts of conspiring with another to commit a felony (felony)
- Two counts of obstruction of justice (felony)
- Two counts of attempted obstruction of justice (felony)

In August 2019, Joshua Federico was convicted of murdering Howell, attempting to murder his estranged wife, malicious wounding, multiple weapons violations, and a burglary charge. The jury recommended two life sentences plus 43 years in prison.

In July 2020, Joshua Federico, in a plea agreement, pleaded guilty to conspiracy to commit capital murder, solicitation to commit capital murder, attempted capital murder and obstruction of justice. In return, several accompanying charges were dropped. In accordance with the agreement Federico was sentenced to 110 years in prison with 100 years suspended. The 10-year active sentence will be tacked on to the two life terms plus 43 years he is serving.

=== Joseph Federico ===
- One count of solicitation to commit murder (felony)
- One count of attempting to commit capital murder (felony)
- Three counts of conspiring with another to commit a felony (felony)
- Two counts of obstruction of justice (felony)
- Two counts of attempted obstruction of justice (felony)

Joseph Federico, 43, pleaded no contest to two counts of conspiracy to commit capital murder, solicitation to commit capital murder and obstruction of justice. Several accompanying charges were dropped. In accordance with the plea agreement, Federico was sentenced to 70 years in prison with 55 suspended, giving him 15 to serve. He had no prior criminal record.

=== Wendy Federico ===
- Three counts of conspiring with another to commit a felony (felony)
- Two counts of obstruction of justice (felony)
- Two counts of attempted obstruction of justice (felony)

The brothers’ mother, Wendy Federico, 64, also was charged in the plot, but she died of cancer April 16 while awaiting trial. She had been held in the medical tier of Riverside Regional Jail throughout her 16 months of incarceration, but was transferred April 15 to a Hopewell hospital, where she died, due to complications that arose from her regularly scheduled chemotherapy treatments.

=== Constantine Trikoulis ===
The Commonwealth’s Attorney withdrew three counts of conspiracy to commit capital murder for hire and one count of being an accessory after the fact to murder against Constantine “Dino” Trikoulis. Trikoulis, 32, pleaded no contest to one misdemeanor count of obstruction of justice and was given a 12-month suspended jail term.
