= New Dominion Pictures =

American television production company (founded 1989)

New Dominion Pictures, LLC.
- Industry: Television
- Founded: 1989; 37 years ago
- Founder: Tom Naughton
- Headquarters: Chesapeake, Virginia
- Key people: Nicolas Valcour (CEO); Kristen Eppley (EVP of Distribution); Kelly Tucker (Director of Development); Jenny Chung (Showrunner); Heidi Allen (Post Production Supervisor); Shirley Bohn (VP of Finance and Production)
- Products: Documentary, reality, non-fiction television programs, specials
- Owner: Radial Entertainment
- Website: www.newdominion.com

New Dominion Pictures, LLC. (also registered as New Dominion Pictures Virginia Beach or New Dominion Pictures Virginia) is an American television production company based in Chesapeake, Virginia, and mainly specialized on producing documentary, reality, and non-fiction television programming and specials.

The company was founded in 1989 by Tom Naughton who also served as the executive producer.

New Dominion has produced programs for major TV networks including Discovery Channel, Destination America, The History Channel and National Geographic.

In August 2023, New Dominion announced that it would partner with M2 Pictures to acquire the distribution rights to the shows from their library, including Wicked Attraction.

On March 4, 2026, Los Angeles-based Radial Entertainment (backed by Oaktree Capital Management, formed by the 2025 merger of FilmRise and Shout! Studios) announced that it would acquire the rights to the New Dominion Pictures library, with the exception of shows produced by M2 Pictures, that New Dominion retains distribution rights to.

In 2025, New Dominion Pictures placed all of their physical assets, including their 6-acre Suffolk campus as well as various movie production equipment, up for auction. The building was sold to a local church and a company representative said all 5 remaining employees will continue to work remotely.

== Television shows ==
- Paleoworld (1994-1997)
- The New Detectives: Case Studies in Forensic Science (1996-2005)
- Ghost Stories (1997-1998)
- The FBI Files (1998-2006)
- Daring Capers (1999-2002)
- Diagnosis: Unknown (2000-2002)
- The Prosecutors: In Pursuit of Justice (2000)
- Navy Seals: The Untold Stories (2001)
- Critical Rescue (2003)
- The Boys of H Company (2003)
- Interpol Investigates (2005)
- A Haunting (2005–2022)
- FantomWorks (2013)
