= Paleoworld =

- Genre: Documentary
- Narrated by: Ben Gazzara (season 1); Nick Schatzki (seasons 2 and 3); Ted Maynard (season 4); Susan Rae (Europe)
- No. of seasons: 4
- No. of episodes: 49

Production
- Running time: 25 minutes
- Production company: New Dominion Pictures

Original release
- Network: The Learning Channel (TLC)
- Release: September 28, 1994 – 1999

Related
- When Dinosaurs Roamed America, Beyond T-rex, Valley of the T. rex and The Ultimate Guide: T-rex

Paleoworld (Jurassica in Europe) is an American documentary television series that aired on The Learning Channel from 1994 to 1999. The series focused on paleontology and comprised 50 half-hour episodes spread over four seasons. It was the first multi-season television series dedicated to paleontology. Clips from the series were frequently used within other paleontology programs aired by the Discovery Channel and other channels owned by the Discovery Network.

== Reception ==
Season 1 (1994) featured a smooth style and was narrated by Ben Gazzara. This series had many musical scenes, and some considered the show calm and relaxing; it also used much more paleoart than later series. Season 2 (1995) and Season 3 (1996) lost the musical element (as well as changing the narrator to Nick Schatzki), which resulted in a more conventional-style nature documentary. Even so, Seasons 2 and 3 were still perceived as maintaining the quality standard. For Season 4 (1997), the series changed narrators again (this time to Ted Maynard), and viewers felt that the show suffered a drop in quality, shifting from being musical and calm, to full-on and repetitive. Consequently, Season 4 was cancelled mid-season, and the series was ended.

== Spin-offs ==
In July 1997, a kid-friendly version of the show called Bonehead Detectives of the Paleoworld, hosted by Rebecca Budig and Danny Tamberelli, aired as a part of Discovery Channel's "Discovery Kids" slot on Sunday mornings. It lasted for only one season (July 1997 to May 1998), and it consisted of just 18 episodes.

In August 1999, TLC aired the 6-episode mini-series When Dinosaurs Ruled, hosted by Jeff Goldblum. This was a Paleoworld spin-off which combined clips from older Paleoworld episodes along with segments describing new discoveries.

== Release ==
Currently, the entire series is not available for purchase. Many DVDs and VHS tapes have been made with episodes from the series; however, most of them have been discontinued and are no longer available to purchase. Three DVDs of Paleoworld with five episodes on each were released in Australia in 2002, and a five-disc set with only 15 episodes from the series was released in the US and Canada. The three-disc set was re-released in 2010.
