= 1999 Dover–Hennessey tornado =

F4 Tornado that struck Dover, OK

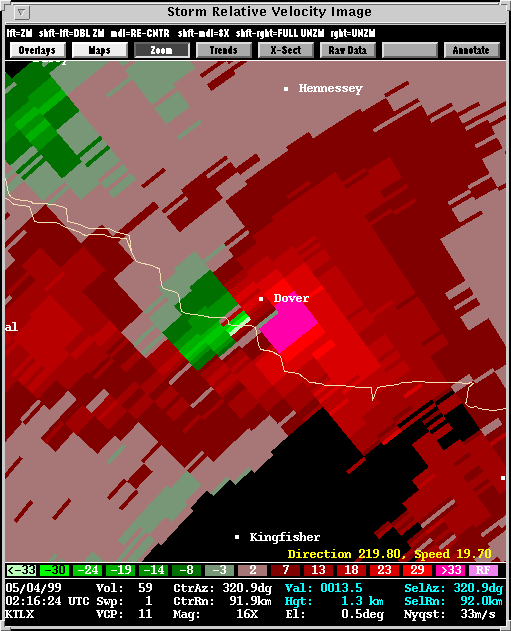
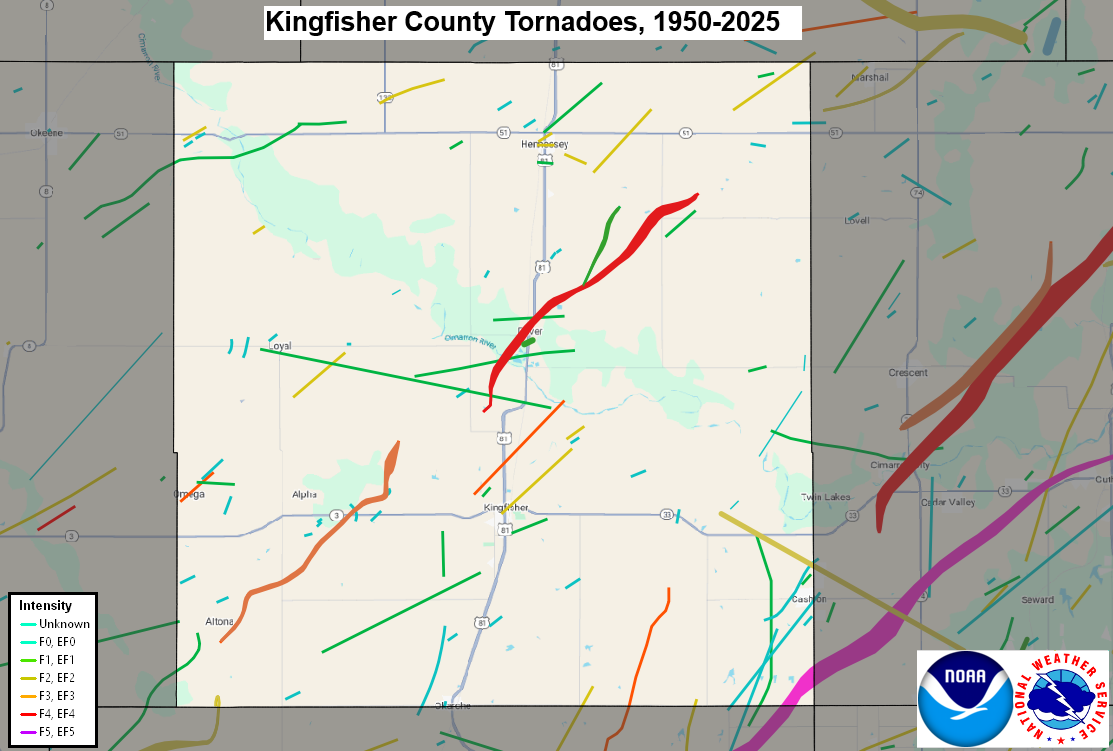
- Counter-clockwise from the top: The tornado near the town of Dover; A Doppler weather radar velocity screenshot of the mesocyclone that produced the tornado over the city of Dover; A map of all Kingfisher County tornadoes since 1950 (note Dover in the center)

Meteorological history
- Formed: May 3, 1999, 9:10 p.m. CDT (UTC−05:00)
- Dissipated: May 3, 1999, 9:38 pm. CDT (UTC−05:00)
- Duration: 28 minutes

F4 tornado
- on the Fujita scale
- Max width: 880 yards (0.50 mi; 0.80 km)
- Path length: 15 miles (24 km)
- Highest winds: 207–260 mph (333–418 km/h)

Overall effects
- Fatalities: 1
- Injuries: 11
- Damage: $2.5 million (1999 USD)
- Areas affected: Kingfisher County, Oklahoma, especially Dover and parts of Hennessey, Oklahoma
- Part of the 1999 Great Plains tornado outbreak and tornadoes of 1999

In the evening hours of May 3, 1999, an exceptionally violent high-end F4 tornado struck the western portion town of Dover, Oklahoma, causing $2.5M (1999 USD) in damages, with about one-third of the homes and buildings in town demolished by the tornado. Occurring as part of a larger tornado outbreak occurring over the region, it was on the ground for 28 minutes, travelled approximately 15 miles (24 km) had a peak width of 880 yards (0.50 mi; 0.80 km), caused 1 fatality and caused over 11 injuries.

The tornado touched down at 9:10 p.m. Central Daylight Time (CDT) in the middle of Kingfisher County, about 4 miles (6.4 km) south-southwest of Dover, producing minor damage, growing in width. Shortly before crossing a nearby river, it rapidly grew in width to its peak width, entering Dover as it produced significant damage towards the western part of the town, with many mobile homes swept away. After the tornado had fully passed Dover, it continued northeast, where it tracked into open fields near Hennesey. As the tornado neared the end of its path, a smaller, short-lived satellite tornado formed beside it, producing only F1 damage. Then, after about 28 minutes of being on the ground, the tornado dissipated.

== Meteorological synopsis ==
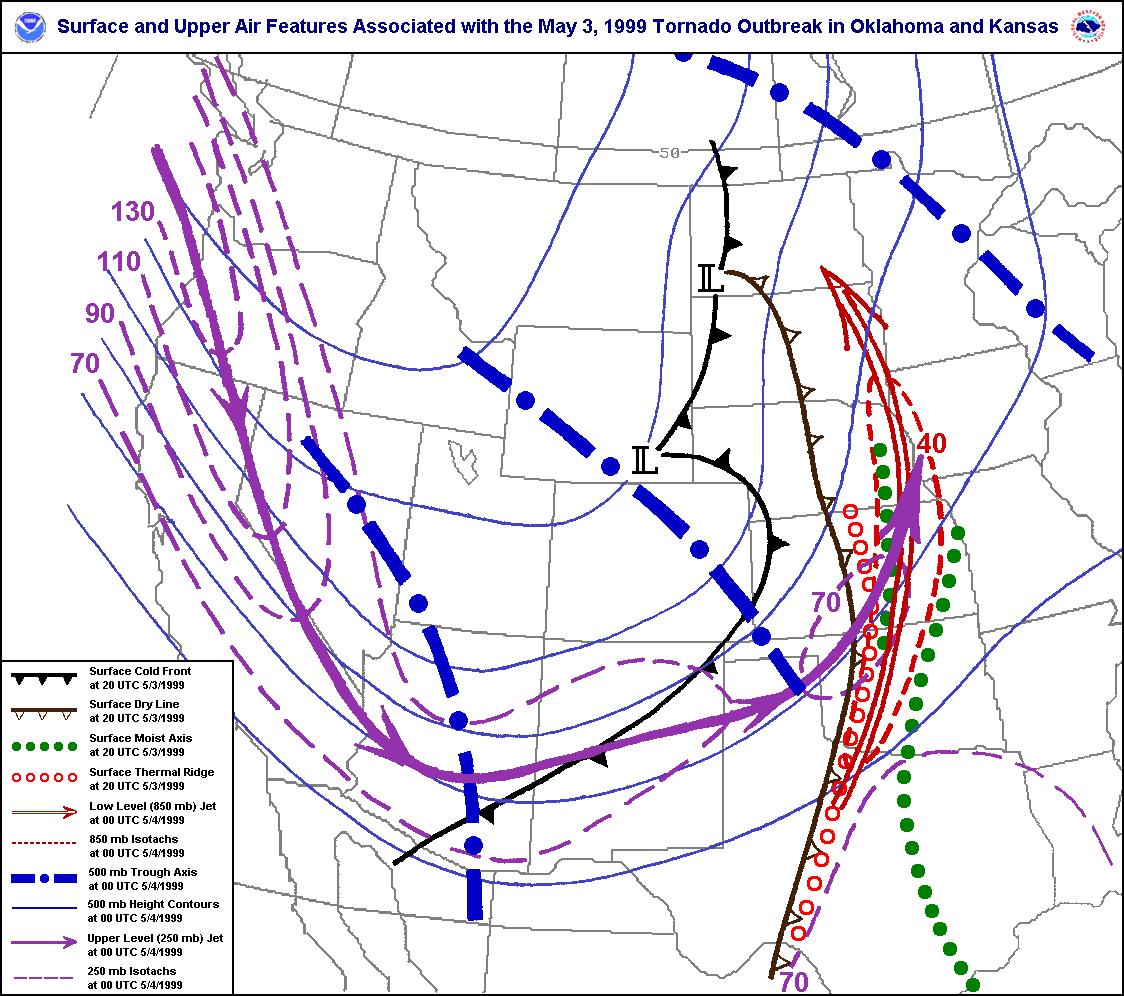
A map of the meteorological setup of the outbreak. The map displays surface and upper level atmospheric features associated with the outbreak.

The Dover tornado was part of a much larger outbreak which produced 71 tornadoes across five states throughout the Central Plains on May 3 alone, along with an additional 25 that touched down a day later in some of the areas affected by the previous day's activity (some of which were spawned by supercells that developed on the evening of May 3), stretching eastward to the Mississippi River Valley. The most prolific tornadic activity associated with the May 3 outbreak – and the multi-day outbreak as a whole – occurred in Oklahoma; 14 of the 66 tornadoes that occurred within the state that afternoon and evening produced damage consistent with the Fujita scale's "strong" (F2–F3) and "violent" (F4–F5) categories, which, in addition to the areas struck by the Bridge Creek–Moore tornado family, affected towns such as Mulhall, Cimarron City, Dover, Choctaw and Stroud.

=== Setup ===
The outbreak was caused by a vigorous upper-level trough that moved into the Central and Southern Plains states on the morning of May 3. That morning, low stratus clouds overspread much of Oklahoma, with clear skies along and west of a dry line located from Gage to Childress, Texas. Air temperatures at 7:00 a.m. Central Daylight Time ranged in the mid to upper 60s °F (upper 10s to near 20 °C) across the region, while dew point values ranged in the low to mid 60s °F (mid to upper 10s °C). The Storm Prediction Center (SPC) in Norman, Oklahoma, a division of the National Weather Service, initially issued a slight risk of severe thunderstorms early that morning stretching from the Kansas-Nebraska border to parts of southern Texas, with an intended threat of large hail, damaging winds and tornadoes. By late morning, the low cloud cover began to dissipate in advance of the dry line, but during the afternoon high cirrus clouds overspread the region, resulting in filtered sunshine in some areas that caused atmospheric destabilization. The sunshine and heating, combined with abundant low-level moisture, combined to produce a very unstable air mass. Upper air balloon soundings observed strong directional wind shear, cooling temperatures at high atmospheric levels, and the increased potential of CAPE values potentially exceeding 4000 J/kg, levels that are considered favorable for supercells and tornadoes.

=== Forecast and initiation ===
The SPC's Day 1 Convective Outlook for May 3, showing the Categorical Graphic

As observations and forecasts began to indicate an increasing likelihood of widespread severe weather conditions even more favorable for strong tornadoes, the SPC issued a moderate risk of severe weather at 11:15 am. CDT for portions of Kansas, Oklahoma and Texas along and near the Interstate 40 corridor.

... N CENTRAL TX/OK/SRN KS ...

LOW LEVEL JET WILL MAINTAIN SIGNIFICANT INFLOW OF LOW LEVEL MOISTURE WITH SURFACE DEWPOINTS AROUND 65F. CLEARING SKIES EVIDENT ON VISIBLE IMAGES WILL FURTHER CONTRIBUTE TO STRONG DESTABILIZATION OVER REGION WITH LATE AFTERNOON MUCAPES FORECASTED FROM 3500 TO 4500 J/KG OVER MDT RISK AREA. AS SHORT WAVE APPROACHES WRN OK/TX BORDER…LIFTING WILL DEEPEN NEAR/ALONG DRYLINE WITH THUNDERSTORMS INCREASING AS THEY MOVE EWD INTO INSTABILITY AXIS. 50 KT MID LEVEL SWLY FLOW SPREADING OVER LOW LEVEL JET AXIS WILL PROVIDE SUFFICIENT SHEAR FOR A FEW STRONG OR VIOLENT TORNADIC SUPERCELLS GIVEN THE ABUNDANT LOW LEVEL MOISTURE AND THE HIGH INSTABILITY.

— NWS Storm Prediction Center (SPC), May 3, 1999 1630 UTC Day 1 Convective Outlook

At 3:49 pm. CDT, the SPC, having gathered enough data to surmise that there was a credible threat of a significant severe weather outbreak occurring within the next few hours, amended its Day 1 Convective Outlook to place the western nine-tenths of the main body of Oklahoma, central and south-central Kansas and the northern two-thirds of Texas under a high severe weather risk, denoting a higher than normal probability of strong (F2+) tornadoes within the risk area. About 40 minutes after the revised outlook's issuance, at 4:30 pm. CDT, the SPC issued a tornado watch for western and central Oklahoma, effective from 4:45 p.m. until 10:00 pm. CDT that evening, for the threat of tornadoes, hail up to three inches (7.6 cm) in diameter, wind gusts to 80 mph (130 km/h) and intense lightning. As that happened, the first thunderstorm cell of the unfolding event had already formed over southwestern Oklahoma.

== Tornado summary ==
=== Thunderstorm formation ===
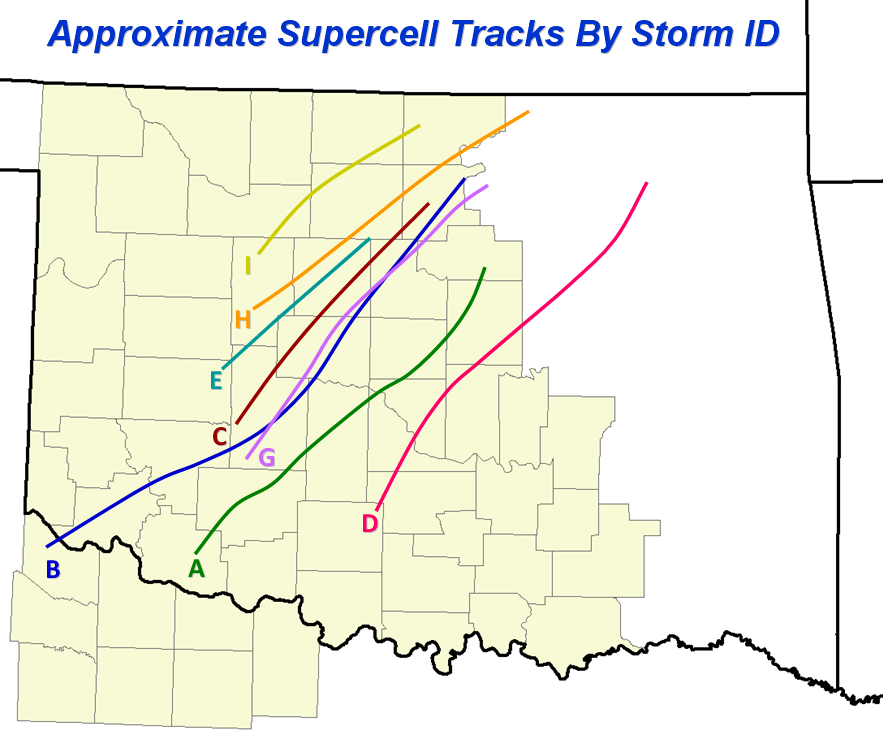
A map of the path of supercells during the 1999 Great Plains tornado outbreak. The "E" is the cell that produced the Dover tornado.

The long-lived supercell thunderstorm that produced the Dover tornado, designated E, formed south-southwest of Blaine County, Oklahoma at 7:57 pm. CDT. It began to grow in strength as it tracked northeast, with a prominently rotating updraft detected early in life. Shortly afterwards, Thunderstorm E joined into a prior formed squall line ranging from Geary, Oklahoma to Hennessey, Oklahoma. The thunderstorm's mesocyclonical rotation strengthened to be tornadic, with it producing its first tornado, E1 which was brief and produced F0 damage. Tornado E2 tracked 11.9 miles (19.2 km) northeast, producing a maximum of F1 damage.

Tornado E3 was an exceptionally strong tornado that struck the small community Altona, Oklahoma as it produced high-end F3 damage, dissipating 7 miles (11 km) west-northwest of Kingfisher, Oklahoma. Tornado E3 also had multiple satellite tornadoes, such as E4 and E5. Shortly after tornado E3 dissipated, the thunderstorm's mesocyclone recycled, tracking for an hour before strengthening immensely just prior to producing the Dover tornado, E6, then it's satellite, E7, before the thunderstorm's eventual dissipation.

The supercell overall produced 7 tornadoes and hail 2.75 inches (7.0 cm) in diameter.

=== Formation and Dover ===
The now recycling mesocyclone steadily began to become tornadic once again, with a Mesocyclone Strength Index (MSI) value of 7,477 recorded. Then at 9:10 pm. CDT, shortly after tornado E3 dissipated, The 6th tornado touched down a mile west of US Route 81, 4 miles (6.4 km) south-southwest of Dover, Oklahoma at F1 intensity. It tracked northeastward through farmland, not inflicting major damage towards structures. The tornado was now produced weak damage at F1 intensity, mainly binded against outbuildings, trees, and Utility poles. Shortly afterwards, It began to progressively grow in width as it tracked along Route 81, shifting eastward onto a track through the Cimarron River, where Dover was ahead.

High-end F4 Damage to a two-story frame home in Dover, Oklahoma

Approaching the Cimarron river, the tornado began to rapidly grow to its maximum width of 880 yards (0.50 mi; 0.80 km) and shifted more eastward towards the town as it intensified. After spotting the tornado vortex signature (TVS) on Doppler weather radar velocity, the Kingfisher County Emergency Management director commanded local law enforcements of Dover, such as fire department and police forces, to traverse the streets with their sirens to warn all residents of the town of Dover to take shelter, as the town did not have a tornado siren. Ten to twenty minutes after the warnings, the tornado entered into the south-southwestern portion of Dover at F3 intensity.

As the tornado tracked northeastward through the southwestern part of Dover, the tornado, initially at F3 intensity, produced extensive damage against 34 mobile homes, 56 houses, and other various structures in which either damaged or blatantly swept away. The tornado, having strengthened to F3-F4 intensity, also completely levelled over 100 powerlines, causing a large-scaled power outage for the town. Trees were also found with either heavy loss of branches, stripped of bark, or mobile home frames forcefully wrapped around them. Residents reported the tornado to have sounded like an oncoming freight train, or an aircraft's jet engine.

The local elementary school and high school were reportedly heavily damaged by the tornado, with it inflicting $300K (1999 USD) in damages towards the schools of Dover. The tornado also struck a large frame home, causing a single fatality, which was a woman chose to not take immedient action after the warnings. The tornado also heavily damaged the town's local scoreboard for baseball games. As the tornado continued northeastward, the tornado struck a steel-reinforced concrete two-story frame home in northern Dover, completely sweeping its walls away at high-end F4 intensity.

=== Satellite and dissipitation ===
Tornado vortex signature on the Doppler weather radar velocity still of the Dover F4 and the weaker satellite

After passing through Dover, the tornado continued northeast of the town, crossing Route 81 into the open fields. As it moved through northeastern Kingfisher County, it began to slowly weaken in intensity, maintaining its width.

At 9:30 p.m CDT, A smaller satellite tornado began forming alongside the Dover tornado, tracking an opposite direction, moving north-northeast towards Hennessey, Oklahoma. This minor tornado then dissipated just south of Hennesey, only ever producing F1 damage. Afterwards, the Dover tornado began decreasing in size and strength, eventually roping out and dissipating 8 minutes later 4 miles (6.4 km) east-southeast of Hennessey.

In total, the Dover-Hennessey tornado was tracked for 15 miles (24 km), had a maximum width of 880 yards (0.50 mi; 0.80 km), caused 11 injuries and 1 fatality, caused $2.5 million (1999 USD) in damages, and lasted 28 minutes.

== Aftermath ==
After the storm's passing, on May 4, 1999, at around 5:10 p.m. CDT (UTC–05:00), the National Weather Service in Norman, Oklahoma released a Public information statement on the tornado outbreak, officially classifying the Dover tornado an F4 rating on the Fujita scale after damage surveys concluded.

PUBLIC INFORMATION STATEMENT

NATIONAL WEATHER SERVICE NORMAN OK 510 PM CST TUE MAY 4 1999

...MORE PRELIMINARY INFORMATION ON THE MAY 3 TORNADO OUTBREAK IN CENTRAL OKLAHOMA...

SURVEYS BY NOAA METEOROLOGISTS CONTINUE THIS AFTERNOON...AND WILL RESUME ON WEDNESDAY...HOWEVER PRELIMINARY SURVEY RESULTS INDICATE THAT A PORTION OF THE TORNADO DAMAGE FROM THE BRIDGE CREEK AREA WEST OF NEWCASTLE...INTO THE EAST LAKE ESTATES DEVELOPMENT IN SOUTHWEST OKLAHOMA CITY IS IN THE F5 CATEGORY. THIS IMPLIES WIND SPEEDS IN EXCESS OF 260 MPH. THIS WAS PART OF THE TRACK PRIOR TO MOORE AND MIDWEST CITY.

ANOTHER VIOLENT TORNADO...RATED F4...OCCURRED AT DOVER IN KINGFISHER COUNTY. A THIRD VIOLENT TORNADO...ALSO RATED F4...OCCURRED THREE MILES EAST OF CRESCENT.

A NUMBER OF OTHER SITES HAVE BEEN SURVEYED...INCLUDING...

SEMINOLE COUNTY...ONE F2 AND TWO F1 TORNADOES FROM ABOUT ONE MILE EAST OF PINK TO THE NORTHWEST SIDE OF SHAWNEE...TO JUST SOUTH OF MEEKER IN LINCOLN COUNTY.

LOGAN COUNTY...F3 DAMAGE FROM JUST SOUTH OF CIMARRON CITY TO MULHALL...WITH THE F4 DAMAGE EMBEDDED EAST OF CRESCENT.

KINGFISHER COUNTY...IN ADDITION TO THE F4 AT DOVER...F3 DAMAGE STARTING ABOUT 8 MILES SOUTHWEST OF DOVER. TWO OTHERS...RATED F1...FROM A FEW MILES NORTHEAST OF GEARY INTO SOUTHWEST KINGFISHER COUNTY. ANOTHER...RATED F0...ABOUT 4 MILES LONG...WEST AND NORTHWEST OF OKARCHE.

CADDO AND GRADY COUNTIES... THE START OF AT LEAST TWO TRACKS IN THE VICINITY OF ANADARKO ARE STILL BEING SURVEYED...BUT INITIAL RATINGS ARE IN THE F1 RANGE. THE START OF THE TRACK LEADING INTO BRIDGE CREEK WAS RATED F3 TO F4 FROM WEST TO NORTH OF CHICKASHA.

— NWS Norman, OK, 1150 AM CST May 4th 1999 Public information statement

Due to the tornado's destruction of the powerlines, the entire town had no power for two days before they could repower the town with generators. During debris removal, Dover had replaced their storm warning system by purchasing a tornado siren from the town of Stillwater, Oklahoma. The tornado had uprooted and heavily damaged almost all trees in nearby parks, causing the Oklahoman Forestry Department to heavily replant and landscape. Classes were cancelled until power was restored in the schools.

President Bill Clinton signed a major disaster declaration for eleven Oklahoma counties on May 4, including Kingfisher. In a press statement by the Federal Emergency Management Agency (FEMA), then-director James Lee Witt stated that, "The President is deeply concerned about the tragic loss of life and destruction caused by these devastating storms." The American Red Cross opened ten shelters overnight across central Oklahoma, including one within the Dover Christian Church, housing a total of 1,600 people immediately following the disaster. By May 5, this number had lowered to 500. Throughout May 5, several post-disaster teams from FEMA were deployed to the region, including emergency response and preliminary damage assessment units. The U.S. Department of Defense deployed the 249th Engineering Battalion and placed the U.S. Army Corps of Engineers on standby for assistance. Medical and mortuary teams were also sent by the U.S. Department of Health and Human Services. By May 6, donation centers and phone banks were being established to create funds for victims of the tornadoes.

On May 12, FEMA also declared that seven counties, Canadian, Craig, Grady, Lincoln, Logan, Noble and Oklahoma, were eligible for federal financial assistance. By May 13, roughly $1.6 million in disaster funds had been approved for housing and businesses loans. This quickly rose to more than $5.9 million over the following five days. By May 21, more than 3,000 volunteers from across the country traveled to Oklahoma to help residents recover. With a $452,199 grant from FEMA, a 60-day outreach program for victims suffering tornado-related stress was set up to help them cope with trauma.

In Kingfisher, Oklahoma, a benefit concert was held on May 28th to aid victims of the Dover tornado. It went on from 6:00–9:00 pm CDT, and was provided for free by Dover's School district. The concert reserved the last performances for local artists of Kingfisher County.

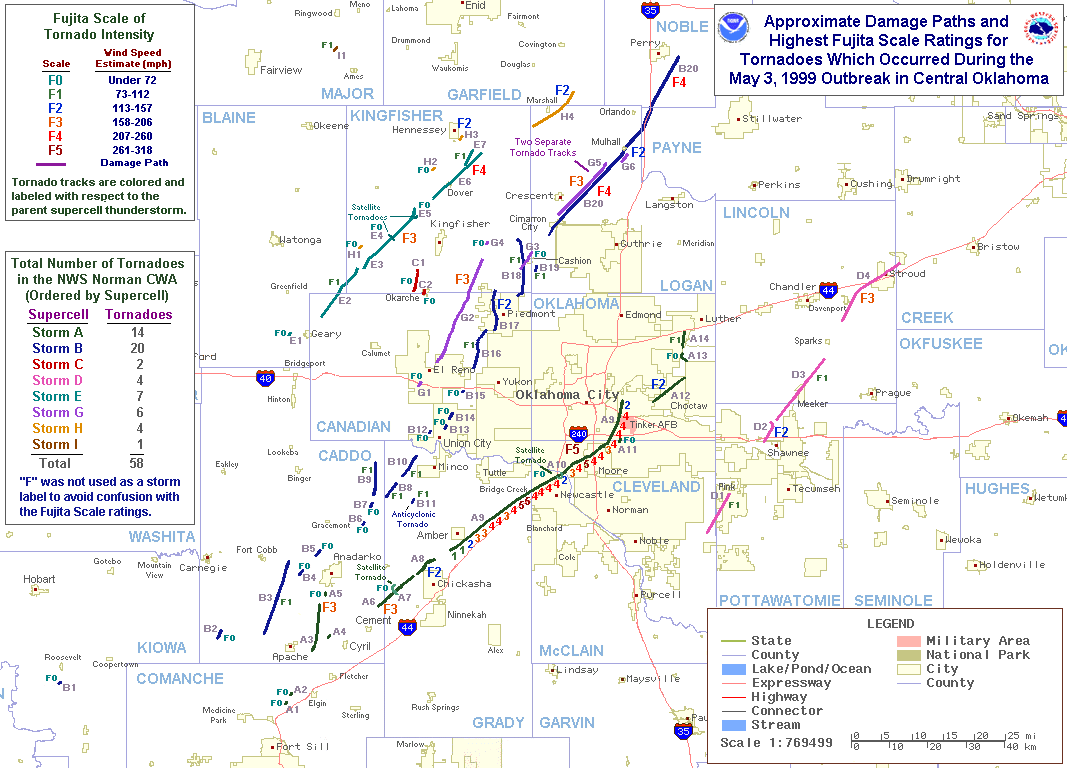
Tornadoes in the 1999 Great Plains tornado outbreak near the Oklahoma City metro area, note Dover off center to the north indicated by the "F4"

Applications for federal aid continued through June, with state approvals reaching $54 million on June 3. By this date, the Army Corps of Engineers reported that 964,170 cubic yards (737,160 m^{3}), roughly 58%, of the 1.65 million cubic yards (126 ha-m) of debris had been removed. Assistance for farmers and ranchers who suffered severe losses from the tornadoes was also available by June 3. After more than a month of being open, emergency shelters were set to be closed on June 18. On June 21, an educational road show made by FEMA visited the hardest hit areas in Oklahoma to urge residents to build storm cellars. According to FEMA, more than 9,500 residents applied for federal aid during the allocated period in the wake of the tornadoes. In all, disaster recovery aid for the tornadoes amounted to roughly $67.8 million by the end of July 2.

== See also ==
- List of North American tornadoes and tornado outbreaks
- List of tornadoes in the 1999 Great Plains tornado outbreak − a chronological list of the tornadoes (as compiled in National Weather Service damage surveys and local storm reports) that occurred over the seven-day period of the outbreak from May 2 to 5, 1999
- 1999 Bridge Creek–Moore tornado – a violent F5 tornado that struck areas elsewhere in Oklahoma just hours earlier
