= 1999 Great Plains tornado outbreak =

Tornado outbreak in May 1999

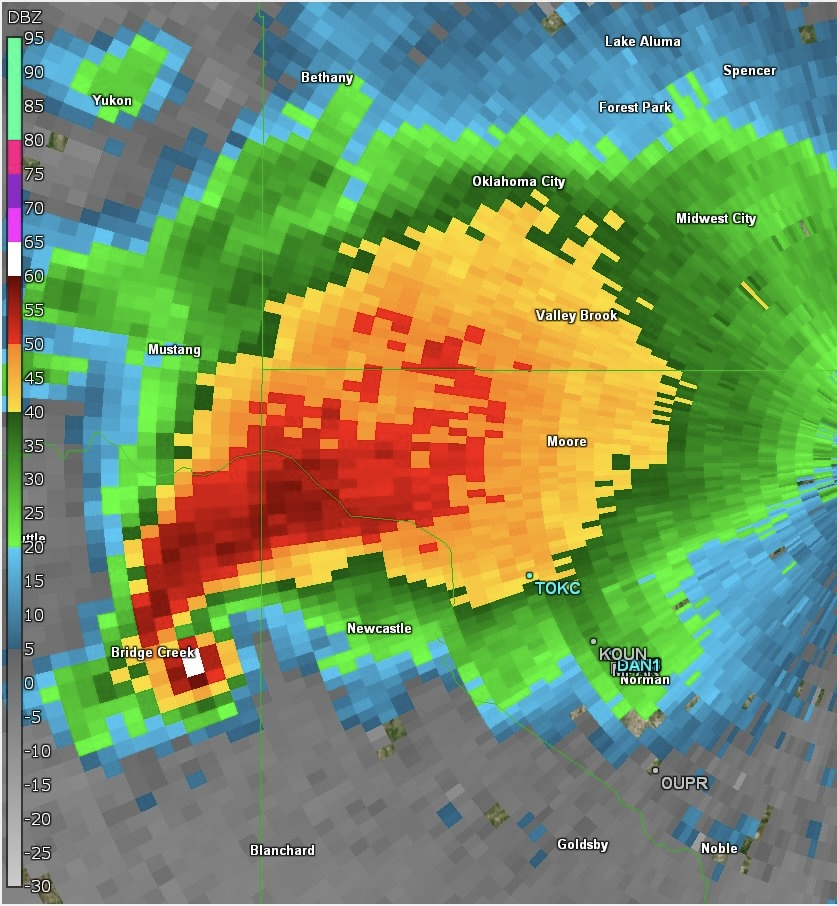
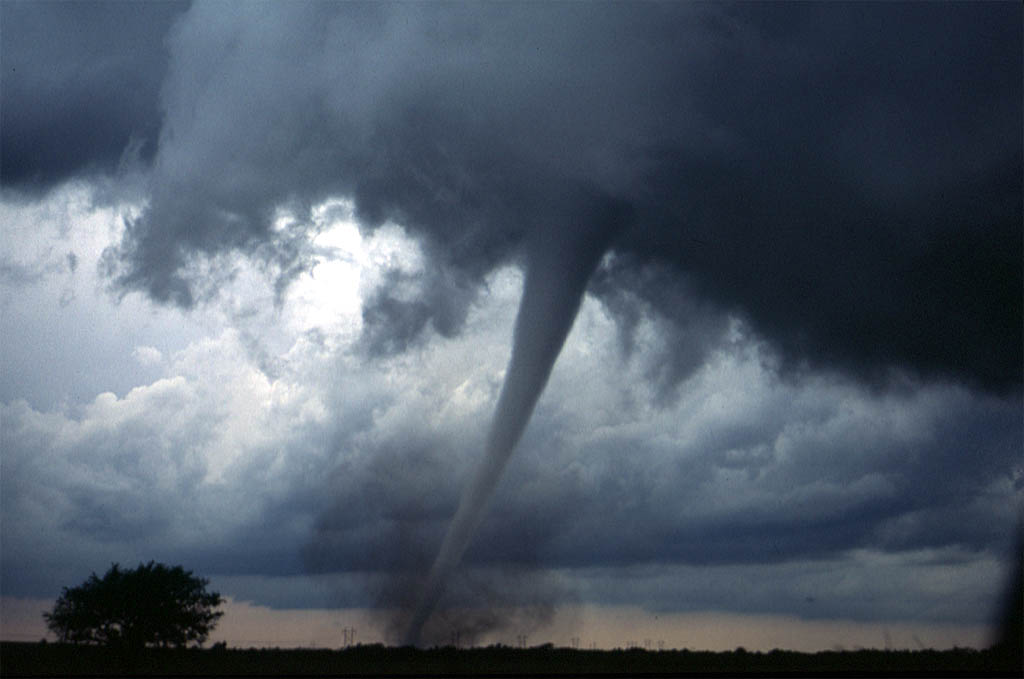
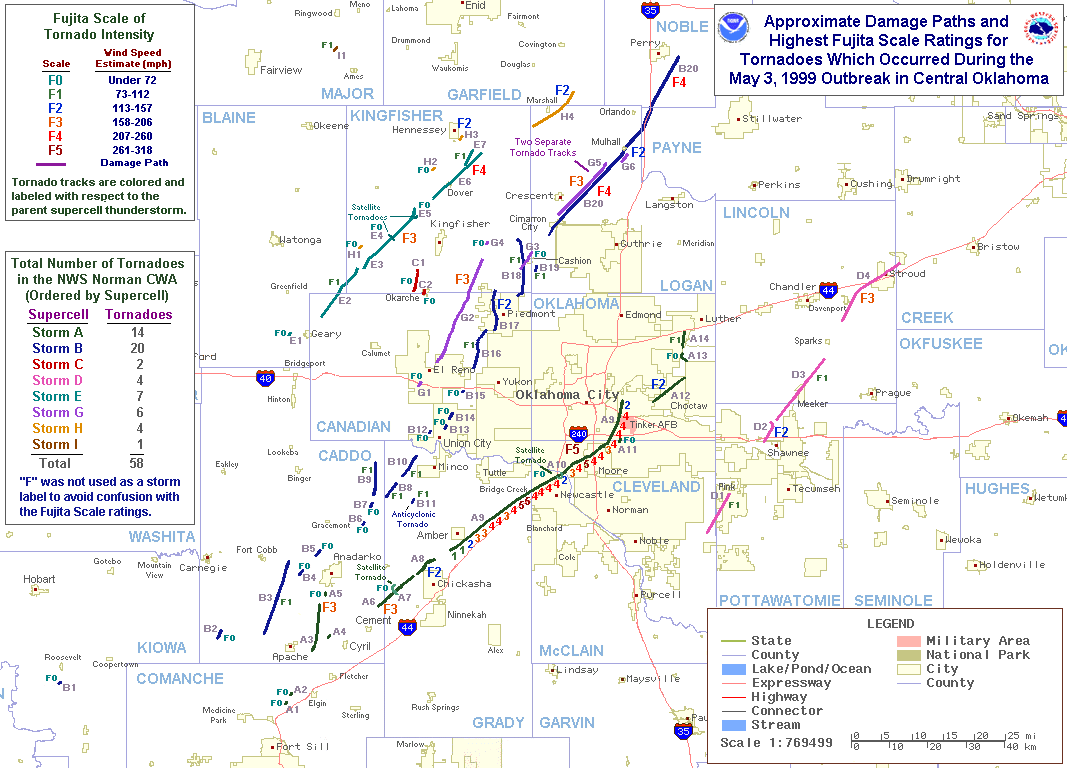
- Clockwise from top: Satellite image of supercells developing across central Oklahoma late on May 3; a tornado near Anadarko, Oklahoma; tracks of all the tornadoes spawned by the outbreak in Oklahoma; radar reflectivity image of the F5 tornado that impacted Bridge Creek and Moore

Meteorological history
- Duration: May 2–5, 1999

Tornado outbreak
- Tornadoes: 141
- Max. rating: F5 tornado
- Duration: 2 days, 8 hours and 1 minute
- Highest winds: Tornadic – 321 mph (517 km/h) (Southwest Oklahoma City, OK F5 tornado on May 3)
- Highest gusts: Non-tornadic – 115 mph (185 km/h) (Claxton, TN non-tornadic on May 7)
- Largest hail: 4.5 in (11 cm) in diameter (multiple locations on May 3)

Overall effects
- Fatalities: 50 fatalities (+7 non-tornadic)
- Injuries: 895
- Damage: $1.5 billion (1999 USD)
- Areas affected: Midwestern, Southern United States, Great Plains
- Part of the Tornado outbreaks of 1999

From May 2–5, 1999, a large, historic, and devastating tornado outbreak took place across much of the Central United States, causing catastrophic impacts. During this three-day event, 141 tornadoes touched down in these areas. The most dramatic events unfolded during the afternoon of May 3 through the early morning hours of May 4 when more than half of these storms occurred. Oklahoma experienced its largest tornado outbreak on record from this event, with 70 confirmed, in what is referred to as the May 3 outbreak, or more officially by the National Weather Service (NWS) and NOAA as the Great Plains Tornado Outbreak of May 3–4, 1999, or the Oklahoma/Kansas tornado outbreak. The most notable of these was the F5 Bridge Creek–Moore tornado which devastated Oklahoma City and suburban communities. The tornado killed 36 people and injured 583 others; losses amounted to $1 billion, making it the first billion-dollar tornado in history. Overall, 50 people lost their lives during the outbreak and damage amounted to $1.4 billion.

On May 2, a strong area of low pressure moved out of the Rocky Mountains and into the High Plains, producing scattered severe weather and ten tornadoes in Nebraska. The following day, atmospheric conditions across Oklahoma became significantly more favorable for an outbreak of severe weather. Wind profiles across the region strongly favored tornadic activity, with the Storm Prediction Center stating, "it became more obvious something major was looming" by the afternoon. Numerous supercell thunderstorms developed across the state as well as bordering areas in Kansas and Texas. Over the following 48 hours, May 3–4, 116 tornadoes touched down across the Central United States.

In 2023, tornado expert Thomas P. Grazulis published the outbreak intensity score (OIS) as a way to rank outbreaks. The outbreak received 145 OIS points, ranking it as a historic tornado outbreak.

== Meteorological synopsis ==
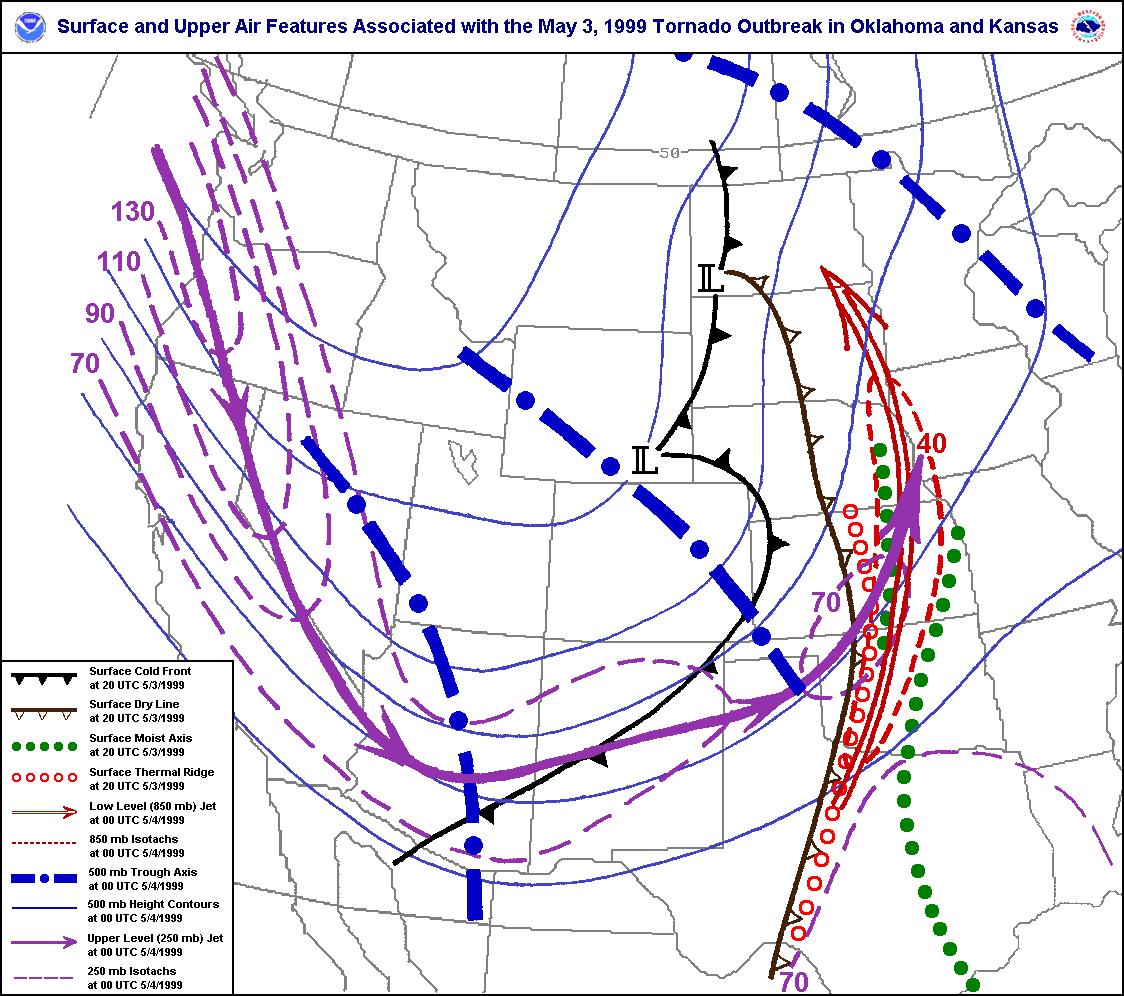
A map of the meteorological setup of the 1999 Oklahoma tornado outbreak. The map displays surface and upper level atmospheric features associated with the outbreak.

On the morning of May 3, in its Day 1 Convective Outlook for the United States, the Storm Prediction Center (SPC) – based in Norman, approximately 10 miles (16 km) south of the tornado's eventual damage path – issued a slight risk of severe thunderstorms from southern Nebraska to central Texas. SPC analysis had detected the presence of a dry line that stretched from western Kansas into western Texas that was approaching a warm, humid air-mass over the Central Plains; the condition ahead of the dry line and a connecting trough positioned over northeastern Colorado appeared to favor the development of thunderstorms later that day that would contain large hail, damaging straight-line winds, and isolated tornadoes.

SPC forecasters initially underestimated the atmospheric conditions that would support tornadic development that afternoon and evening. Around 4:00 a.m. CDT that morning, Doppler radar and wind profile data indicated a 90-knot (100 mph; 170 km/h) streak of elevated jet stream winds along the California−Nevada border, though weather balloon soundings sent up the previous evening by National Weather Service (NWS) offices in the western U.S. and numerical computer model data failed to detect the fast-moving air current as it moved ashore from the Pacific Ocean. In addition, the dry line was diffused, with surface winds behind and ahead of the boundary moving into the region from a southerly direction. SPC meteorologists began to recalculate model data during the morning to account for the stronger wind profiles caused by the jet streak; the data acknowledged that thunderstorms would occur within the Central Plains, but disagreed on the exact area of greatest severe weather risk.

By 7:00 a.m. CDT, CAPE (convective available potential energy) values began exceeding 4,000 J/kg, an extreme value well above the climatological threshold favoring the development of severe thunderstorms. Despite conflicting model data on the specified area where thunderstorms would develop, the newly available information that denoted a more favorable severe thunderstorm setup in that part of the state prompted the SPC to upgrade the forecasted threat of severe weather to a moderate risk for south-central Kansas, much of the western two-thirds of Oklahoma, and the northwestern and north-central portions of Texas at 11:15 a.m. CDT that morning, which now indicated that the atmospheric conditions present would "provide sufficient shear for a few strong or violent tornadic supercells given the abundant low level moisture and the high instability." The increasing threat of a severe weather/tornado outbreak for late that afternoon into the evening was reemphasized by NWS Norman forecasters in a Thunderstorm Outlook issued by the office at 12:30 p.m. CDT.

Depicts radar imagery (reflectivity) taken by the National Weather Service NEXRAD radar, KTLX, in Central Oklahoma during the May 1999 tornado outbreak. This imagery is from May 3. (Click for high-quality.)

By the early afternoon, forecasters at both the SPC and NWS Norman forecast office (both of which shared an office complex near Max Westheimer Airport at the time), realized that a major event was likely to take place based solely on observational data from radar and weather satellite imagery and balloon soundings, as the computer models remained uncooperative in helping meteorologists determine where the greatest threat of severe storms would occur.

Conditions became highly conducive for tornadic development by 1:00 p.m. CDT as wind shear intensified over the region (as confirmed by an unscheduled balloon sounding flight conducted by the NWS Norman office), creating a highly unstable atmosphere. The sounding balloon recorded winds blowing southwesterly at 20 and 50 mph (32 and 80 km/h) respectively at the surface and at the 12,000-foot (3,700 m) level, southerly winds of 40 mph (64 km/h) and westerly winds of 20 mph (32 km/h) at 20,000 feet (6,100 m); it also indicated that a capping inversion over the region was weakening in southwestern Oklahoma and north Texas. With the warm air above the surface cooling down, this allowed warm air at the surface the chance to rise and potentially create thunderstorms. Although cirrus clouds − a bank of which had developed in west Texas and overspread portions of Oklahoma later in the morning − were present through much of the day, an area of clearing skies over western north Texas and southwestern Oklahoma early that afternoon allowed for the sun to heat up the moisture-laden region, creating significant atmospheric instability.

At 3:49 p.m. CDT, the SPC − having gathered enough data to surmise that there was a credible threat of a significant severe weather outbreak occurring within the next few hours − amended its Day 1 Convective Outlook to place the western nine-tenths of the main body of Oklahoma, central and south-central Kansas and the northern two-thirds of Texas under a high severe weather risk, denoting a higher than normal probability of strong (F2+) tornadoes within the risk area. About 40 minutes after the revised outlook's issuance, at 4:30 p.m. CDT, the SPC issued a tornado watch for western and central Oklahoma, effective from 4:45 p.m. until 10:00 p.m. CDT that evening, for the threat of tornadoes, hail up to three inches (7.6 cm) in diameter, wind gusts to 80 mph (130 km/h) and intense lightning. As that happened, the first thunderstorm cell of the unfolding event had already formed over southwestern Oklahoma.

== Confirmed tornadoes ==
Confirmed tornadoes by Fujita rating
FU	F0	F1	F2	F3	F4	F5	Total
0	68	39	17	10	4	1	141

=== Bridge Creek–Moore, Oklahoma ===
Bridge Creek–Moore, Oklahoma
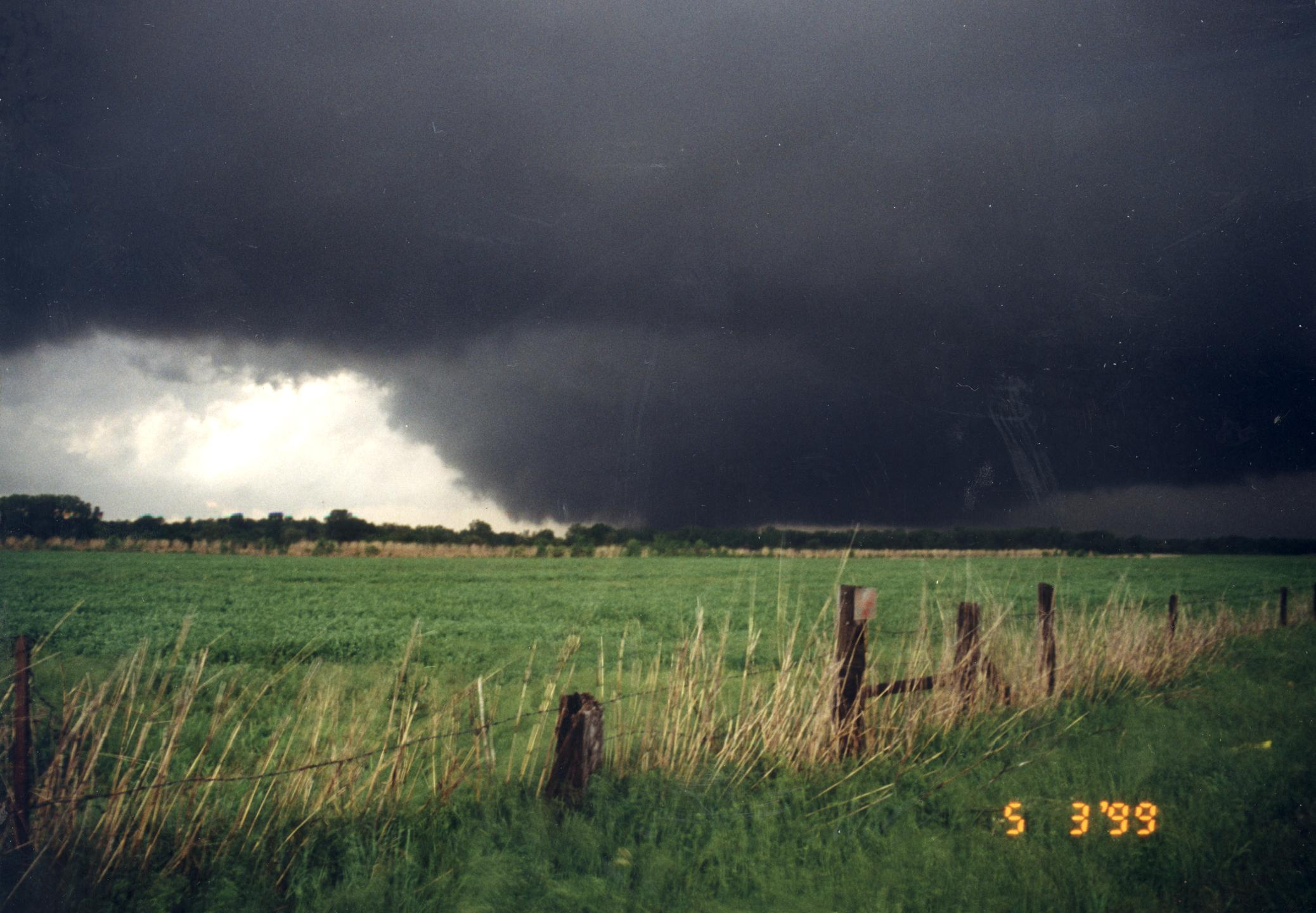
- The tornado near peak intensity in Bridge Creek.

Meteorological history
- Formed: May 3, 1999, 6:23 p.m. CDT (UTC−05:00)
- Dissipated: May 3, 1999, 7:48 pm. CDT (UTC−05:00)
- Duration: 1 hour, 25 minutes

F5 tornado
- on the Fujita scale
- Highest winds: 321 mph (517 km/h) (as measured by mobile Doppler radar)

Overall effects
- Fatalities: 36 (+5 indirect)
- Injuries: 583
- Damage: $1 billion (1999 USD)

At approximately 3:30 p.m. CDT, a severe thunderstorm began forming in Tillman County in southwestern Oklahoma; a severe thunderstorm warning was issued for this storm by the National Weather Service Weather Forecast Office in Norman at 4:15 p.m. CDT. The storm quickly developed supercell characteristics and began exhibiting potentially tornadic rotation, resulting in the National Weather Service issuing the first tornado warning of the event for Comanche, Caddo, and Grady counties approximately 35 minutes later at 4:50 p.m. CDT.

The first tornado from this supercell touched down 7 miles (11 km) east-northeast of Medicine Park at 4:51 p.m. CDT; it produced four additional tornadoes as it tracked northeast into Caddo County, the strongest of which (rated as an F3) touched down 2 miles (3.2 km) west-southwest of Laverty and dissipated 2.5 miles (4.0 km) west-northwest of downtown Chickasha. This large tornado had exhibited a companion satellite tornado for a few minutes.

The storm produced the most significant tornado of the outbreak, which touched down just southwest of the Grady County community of Amber at 6:23 p.m. CDT and headed northeast, parallel to Interstate 44, just after another tornado had passed over the airport in Chickasha. The storm continued moving northeast, destroying the community of Bridge Creek and crossing I-44 just north of Newcastle. The tornado then crossed the Canadian River, passing into far southern Oklahoma City. As it passed over Bridge Creek, around 6:54 p.m., a Doppler On Wheels mobile Doppler weather radar detected wind speeds of 302 mph (486 km/h) – later revised to 321 mph (517 km/h) – inside the tornado at an elevation of 105 ft (32 m). These winds, however, occurred above the ground, and winds at the surface may not have been quite this intense. The tornado continued on into Moore, then passed over the intersection of Shields Boulevard and Interstate 35 and back into Oklahoma City, crossing Interstate 240 near Bryant Avenue. The storm then turned more northerly, striking parts of Del City and Tinker Air Force Base near Sooner Road as an F4. The storm damaged and/or destroyed several businesses, homes and churches in Midwest City. Some damage in this area was rated as high-end F4, although F5 was considered. The tornado diminished over Midwest City and finally lifted near the intersection of Reno Avenue and Woodcrest Drive.

Thirty-six people died in this tornado, and over 8,000 homes were badly damaged or destroyed. The tornado caused $1 billion in damage, making it the second-costliest tornado in U.S. history, and the most costly in history from 1999 to 2011, at which point it was surpassed by the 2011 Tuscaloosa–Birmingham tornado and again by the 2011 Joplin tornado. It was also the deadliest tornado to hit the U.S. since the April 10, 1979 F4 tornado that hit Wichita Falls, Texas, which killed 42 people.

=== Wellington–Haysville–South Wichita, Kansas ===
Wellington–Haysville–South Wichita, Kansas
- The tornado captured as it was impacting Haysville, Kansas

Meteorological history
- Formed: May 3, 1999, 8:13 p.m. CDT (UTC−05:00)
- Dissipated: May 3, 1999, 8:55 pm. CDT (UTC−05:00)
- Duration: 42 minutes

F4 tornado
- on the Fujita scale
- Highest winds: 207–260 mph (333–418 km/h)

Overall effects
- Fatalities: 6
- Injuries: 150
- Damage: $145 million (1999 USD)

This violent tornado first touched down north of Wellington, Kansas around 8:13 p.m. CDT, downing several power poles in the area, and tracked north-northeast. Along its path, two mobile homes, three sheds, and a pole barn were destroyed while nine other buildings sustained damage. Four people were injured in Sumner County, Kansas, three of which occurred when a mobile home was destroyed. About 20 minutes after touching down, the tornado crossed into Sedgwick County about 1 mi (1.6 km) west of Peck. At 8:35 p.m. CDT, the now violent tornado struck a mobile home park in Haysville, destroying much of the subdivision and killing three people. Continuing into the city's central business district, the tornado caused further damage and killed a fourth person. Throughout Haysville, 186 buildings were damaged or destroyed. Continuing into South Wichita, the tornado leveled the Lakeshore and Pacesetter mobile home parks, killing two residents. The tornado maintained a general northeast track before dissipating in the College Hill District of Northeast Wichita.

In total, the tornado killed six people in total and injured more than 145 others along its 24 mi (39 km)-long path. Approximately $145 million in damages were caused by the tornado, most of which came from Haysville. It was the second of two deadly twisters Haysville was severely impacted by in the 1990s, with the previous being the 1991 Andover tornado. Throughout Sedgwick County, 1,109 buildings were destroyed and 7,371 buildings were damaged, 2,456 severely.

=== Dover–Henessey, Oklahoma ===
Dover–Henessey, Oklahoma
- The tornado near Dover

Meteorological history
- Formed: May 3, 1999, 9:10 p.m. CDT (UTC−05:00)
- Dissipated: May 3, 1999, 9:38 p.m. CDT (UTC−05:00)
- Duration: 28 minutes

F4 tornado
- on the Fujita scale
- Highest winds: 207–260 mph (333–418 km/h)

Overall effects
- Fatalities: 1
- Injuries: 11
- Damage: $2.5 million (1999 USD)

This violent high-end F4 tornado struck the town of Dover, Oklahoma, causing US$2.5M (1999 USD) in damages, with the northern part of town taking a direct hit, damaging and destroying about one-third of the homes and buildings in town.

After the supercell that eventually produced the tornado, designated E, began signs of rotation and intensification near Geary, Oklahoma, at 9:10 p.m. Central Daylight Time, the tornado touched down a mile west of Route 81, 4 miles south-southwest of Dover, Oklahoma near the town of Geary, Oklahoma. It started to slowly grow in width, not damaging any major structures. In this phase, the tornado caused F1 damage mainly restricted to outbuildings, trees, and telephone poles. It then began to rapidly grow in size, and shifted Northeast towards the city of Dover. Approaching the Cimarron river, the tornado began to rapidly grow to its maximum width of 880 yards (0.50 mi; 0.80 km) and shifted towards the town's direction promptly. Upon crossing the river and reaching maximum width, it began to strengthen. Officials including sheriffs and wardens traversed the streets to warn all residents of the town of Dover to take shelter, before the storm's eventful arrival. Ten to twenty minutes after the warnings, the tornado had arrived, ripping through the northwest part of town. Initially, the tornado dealt damages up to F3, however eventually F4 Damage was observed, with 34 mobile homes, houses, and various structures were either damaged or blatantly destroyed, including a steel-reinforced concrete home reduced to its foundation, with all of its walls swept away. Trees were found with heavy loss of branches and stripped of all of their bark. During its passing over Dover, one resident chose to not take immediate action after the warnings, and was killed after the tornado collapsed their large frame home.

After its rampage over Dover, it continued northeast of the town, mainly over open fields. It began to weaken significantly, with damage at this point observed to be F1, though it somewhat maintained its width. At 9:30 p.m. CDT (UTC–05:00) A second tornado formed alongside with the dying F4 headed towards Hennessey, though was highly weak and short-lived. Maximum observed destruction from this minor vortex was F1. Then, the tornado rapidly weakened, and eventually dissipated 8 minutes later, 7 miles east-southeast of Hennessey, Oklahoma.

In total, the tornado covered 15 miles, had a maximum width of 0.5 miles (0.8 km), and lasted 28 minutes. Around eleven were injured and one was killed. The tornado had caused around $2.5M (1999 USD) in damages, with one-third of the town devastated by the storm.

=== Cimarron City–Mulhall–Perry, Oklahoma ===
Cimarron City–Mulhall–Perry, Oklahoma
- The tornado near Mulhall, Oklahoma.

Meteorological history
- Formed: May 3, 1999, 9:25 p.m. CDT (UTC−05:00)
- Dissipated: May 3, 1999, 10:45 p.m. CDT (UTC−05:00)
- Duration: 1 hour, 20 minutes

F4 tornado
- on the Fujita scale
- Highest winds: 257 mph (414 km/h) (as measured by mobile Doppler radar)

Overall effects
- Fatalities: 2
- Injuries: 26
- Damage: $100 million (1999 USD)

Late in the evening on May 3 at 9:25 p.m. CDT, this destructive tornado touched down 3 miles (4.8 km) southwest of Cimarron City in Logan County, Oklahoma, eventually hitting the town of Mulhall, located north of Guthrie. This wedge tornado, which tracked a 39-mile (63 km) path, was very wide and at times exceeded one mile (1.6 km) in width. According to storm chasing meteorologist Roger Edwards, it may have been as violent or more than the F5 Bridge Creek–Moore tornado (however, it was officially rated as an F4).

A Doppler On Wheels (DOW) mobile radar observed this tornado as it crossed Mulhall. The DOW documented the largest-ever-observed core flow circulation with a distance of 1,600 m (5,200 ft) between peak velocities on either side of the tornado, and a roughly 7 km (4.3 mi) width of peak wind gusts exceeding 43 m/s (96 mph), making the Mulhall tornado the largest tornado ever measured quantitatively. The DOW measured a complex multi-vortex structure, with several vortices containing winds of up to 257 mph (414 km/h) rotating around the tornado. The 3D structure of the tornado has been analyzed in a 2005 article in the Journal of the Atmospheric Sciences by Wen-Chau Lee and Joshua Wurman. The tornado severely damaged or destroyed approximately 60–70% of the 130 homes in Mulhall, destroying the Mulhall/Orlando Elementary School and toppling the city's water tower.

After the tornado dissipated at approximately 10:45 p.m. CDT in southeastern Noble County, 3 miles (4.8 km) northeast of Perry, many of the same areas of Logan County struck by the Mulhall tornado were hit again by an F3 tornado. However, this one was produced by a separate supercell that touched down 2.5 miles (4.0 km) south of Crescent at 10:56 p.m. CDT. Damage caused by this tornado was indistinguishable from damage caused by the earlier F4 tornado. 25 homes were destroyed and 30 others were damaged near Crescent, with much of the damage believed to have been caused by both tornadoes.

=== Stroud, Oklahoma ===
Stroud, Oklahoma
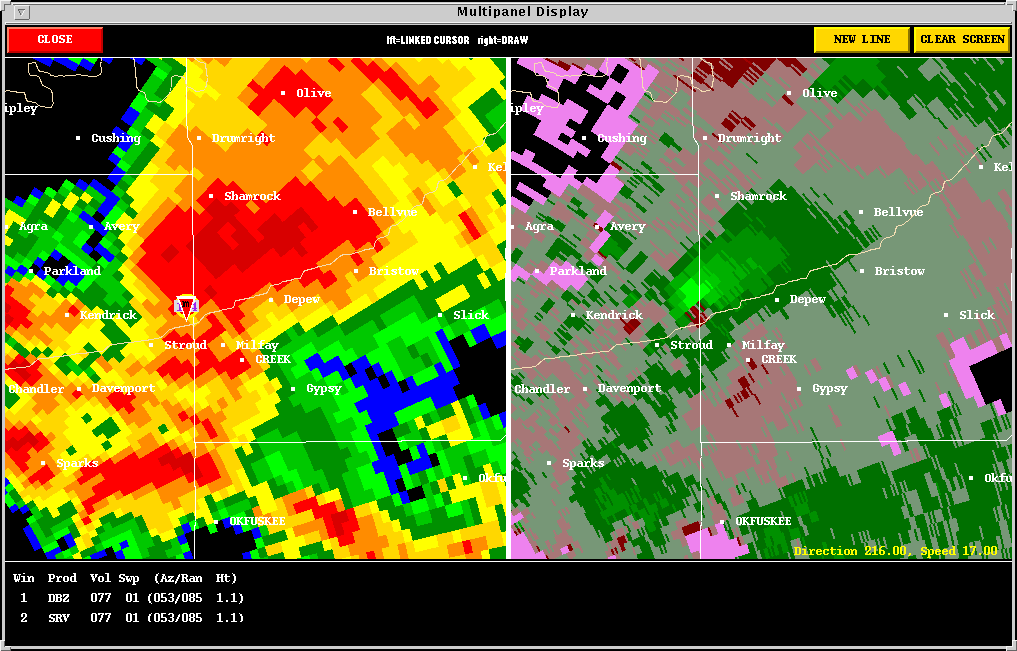
- A radar image of the supercell as the tornado struck Stroud.

Meteorological history
- Formed: May 3, 1999, 10:10 p.m. CDT (UTC−05:00)
- Dissipated: May 3, 1999, 10:50 p.m. CDT (UTC−05:00)
- Duration: 40 minutes

F3 tornado
- on the Fujita scale
- Highest winds: 158–206 mph (254–332 km/h)

Overall effects
- Fatalities: 0
- Injuries: 7

At 10:10 p.m. CDT, this intense and damaging tornado touched down 3 miles (4.8 km) north-northeast of Sparks in Lincoln County, Oklahoma, with only sporadic tree damage occurring as it tracked north-northeast toward Davenport. Scattered damage of high-end F0 to low-end F1 intensity occurred to some homes and businesses on the southeast side of Davenport, though a house located just south of town lost more than half of its roof. As the tornado continued to track northeast, parallel with Interstate 44 and State Highway 66, Stroud took a direct hit as the storm intensified to F2 strength; the trucking terminal of the Sygma food distribution warehouse on the west side of town was destroyed with some girders and siding from the warehouse thrown northwest across State Highway 66, and the Stroud Municipal Hospital suffered significant roof damage, which resulted in significant water damage within the building. The most severe damage, consistent with an F3 tornado, occurred at the Tanger Outlet Mall at 10:39 p.m. CDT with almost all of the stores suffering roof damage at minimum, though sections of seven storefronts were destroyed and the exterior walls of the Levi's store were collapsed inward. The mall was evacuated in advance of the tornado, resulting in no injuries or loss of life in the building. The tornado finally dissipated 1 mile (1.6 km) south of Stroud Lake at 10:50 p.m. CDT.

While there were no fatalities overall in Stroud, the economic impact of the tornado has been compared to the loss of Tinker Air Force Base, General Motors, and a major regional hospital for the Stroud region as compared to Oklahoma City at that time. Approximately 800 jobs were lost in a community of approximately 3,400 people due to the damage of the Sygma distribution warehouse and Tanger Outlet Mall, neither of which were rebuilt. Stroud's recovery was later complicated by the September 11, 2001, terrorist attacks, although the town has since recovered as a result of higher oil and gas prices. Local leading industries include Service King, an oilfield manufacturing facility, and Mint Turbines, a helicopter engine reconditioning facility. Stroud is also now a downloading facility location for oil produced in the northern United States into the Cushing pipeline network.

=== Other tornadoes ===
The May 3 tornado event was part of a three-day event that included tornadoes in the states of Kansas, Texas and Tennessee. Other fatalities during the event included one person killed in Texas on May 4 by an F3 tornado that tracked 71.5 miles (115.1 km) from near Winfield, Texas, to southwest of Mineral Springs, Arkansas, and three people killed in Tennessee on May 5 and 6 by an F4 tornado that struck the town of Linden.

== Non-tornadic events ==
Flash flooding killed one person in Camden County, Missouri, on May 4. On May 6, lightning struck and killed a man in Cobbtown, Georgia.

== Aftermath ==
=== Disaster assistance ===
Structural damage in Oklahoma
	Oklahoma and Cleveland counties	Other counties
Homes destroyed	1,780	534
Homes damaged	6,550	878
Businesses destroyed	85	79
Businesses damaged	42	54
Public buildings destroyed	4	7
Apartments destroyed	473	568

On May 3–4, the day after the initial outbreak event, President Bill Clinton signed a federal disaster declaration for eleven Oklahoma counties. In a press statement by the Federal Emergency Management Agency (FEMA), then-director James Lee Witt stated that "The President is deeply concerned about the tragic loss of life and destruction caused by these devastating storms." The American Red Cross opened ten shelters overnight, housing 1,600 people immediately following the disaster, decreasing to 500 people by May 5. On May 5, several emergency response and damage assessment teams from FEMA were deployed to the region. The United States Department of Defense deployed the 249th Engineering Battalion and placed the U.S. Army Corps of Engineers on standby for assistance. Medical and mortuary teams were also sent by the U.S. Department of Health and Human Services. By May 6, donation centers and phone banks were being established to create funds for victims of the tornadoes. Within the first few days of the disaster declaration, relief funds were sent to families requesting aid. Roughly $180,000 had been approved by FEMA for disaster housing assistance by May 9.

Debris removal began on May 12 as seven cleanup teams were sent to the region with more teams expected to join over the following days. That day, FEMA also granted seven Oklahoma counties (Canadian, Craig, Grady, Lincoln, Logan, Noble and Oklahoma) eligibility for federal financial assistance. Roughly $1.6 million in disaster funds had been approved for housing and business loans by May 13, increasing to more than $5.9 million over the following five days. Applications for federal aid continued through June, with state aid approvals reaching $54 million on June 3. According to FEMA, more than 9,500 Oklahoma residents applied for federal aid during the allocated period in the wake of the tornadoes, including 3,800 in Oklahoma County and 3,757 in Cleveland County. Disaster recovery aid for the tornadoes totaled to roughly $67.8 million by July 2.

=== Concerns with using overpasses as storm shelters ===
Outbreak death toll
State	Fatalities	County	County total
Kansas	6	Sedgwick	6
Oklahoma	40	Cleveland	11
Oklahoma	40	Grady	12
Oklahoma	40	Kingfisher	1
Oklahoma	40	Logan	1
Oklahoma	40	McClain	1
Oklahoma	40	Payne	1
Oklahoma	40	Pottawatomie	1
Oklahoma	40	Oklahoma	12
Tennessee	3	Perry	3
Texas	1	Titus	1
Total	50		
All deaths were tornado-related

From a meteorological and safety standpoint, the tornado called into question the use of highway overpasses as shelters from tornadoes. Prior to the events on May 3, 1999, videos of people taking shelter in overpasses during tornadoes in the past (such as an infamous video from the April 26, 1991 tornado outbreak taken by a news crew from Wichita NBC affiliate KSNW) created public misunderstanding and complacency that overpasses provided adequate shelter from tornadoes. Although meteorologists had questioned the safety of these structures for nearly 20 years, there had been no evidence supporting incidents involving loss of life. Three overpasses were directly struck by tornadoes during the May 3 outbreak, resulting in fatalities at each location. Two occurred as a result of the Bridge Creek–Moore F5, while the third occurred in rural Payne County, which was struck by an F2 tornado. According to a study by the National Oceanic and Atmospheric Administration, seeking shelter in an overpass "is to become a stationary target for flying debris"; the wind channeling effect that occurs within these structures along with an increase in wind speeds above ground level, changing of wind direction when the tornado vortex passes, and the fact most overpasses do not have girders for people to take shelter between also provide little to no protection.

== See also ==
- Climate of Oklahoma City
- List of North American tornadoes and tornado outbreaks
- Tornado outbreak of April 28–30, 1960
- Ultimate Tornado (documentary)
- 2013 Moore tornado – Crossed some of the same areas as the 1999 F5
