= Mesocyclone Strength Index =

Index based on the strength of rotation within a mesocyclone

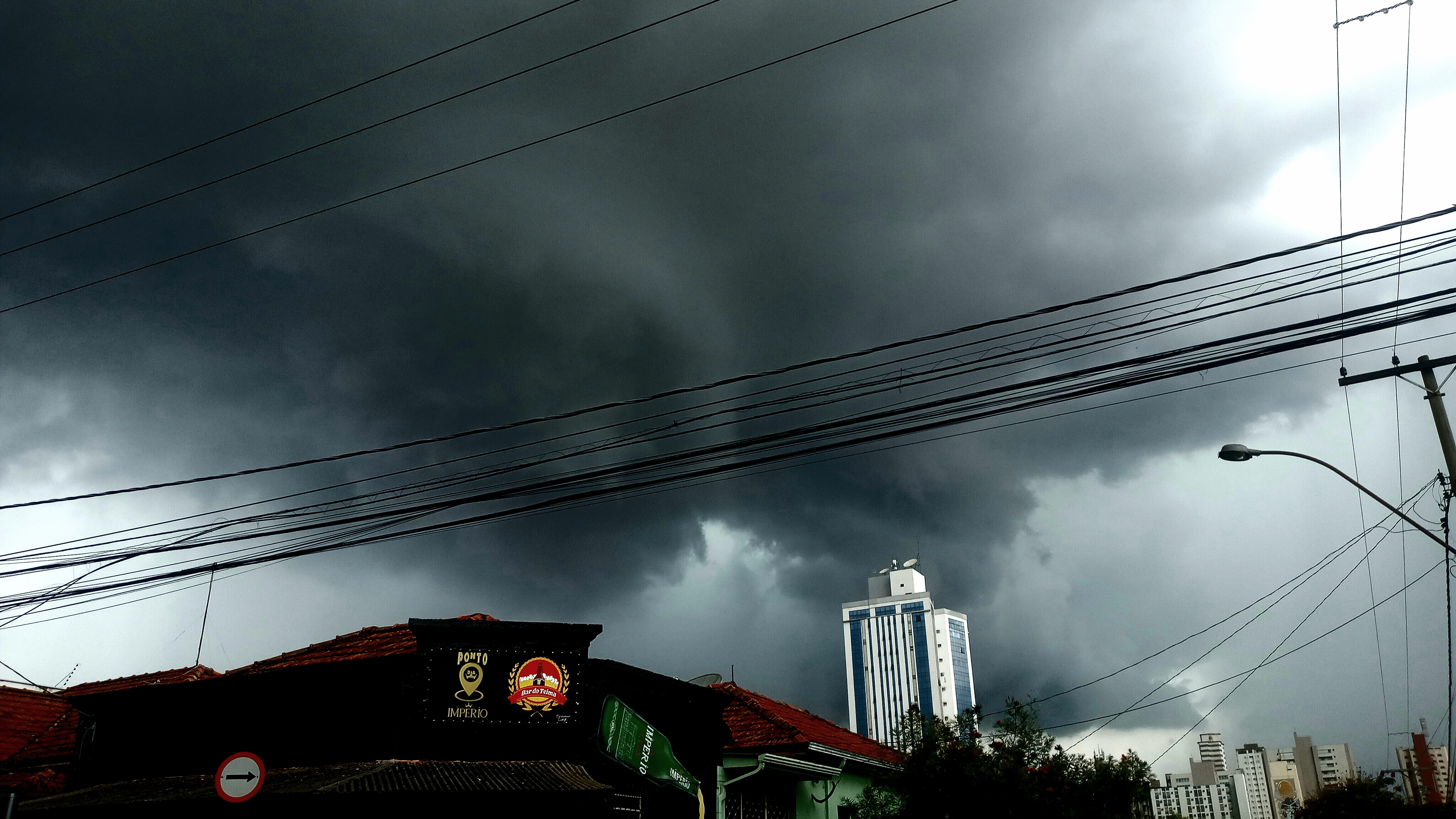
A mesocyclone formation over Piraciaba, Brazil

The mesocyclone strength index (MSI) is a vortex rotation strength index used in tornado prediction and mesoscale meteorology. Produced by the National Severe Storms Laboratory as one of the five parameters for the mesocyclone detection algorithm (MDA), it is usually found on doppler weather radar velocity.

== Detection ==
=== MSI values ===
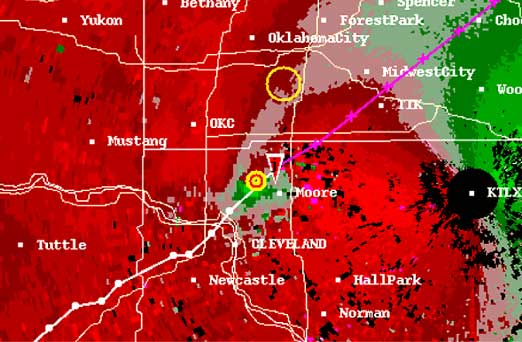
Mesocyclone detection on the historic 1999 Bridge Creek–Moore tornado

Mesocyclones after detected by the MDA get a computer-calculated MSI value alongside the Tornado Vortex Signature (TVS). Values greater than 3,600 MSI are considered tight, with tornadic formation usually likely in the mesocyclonical region.

In various radar programs, MSI is usually shown by hovering or tapping on TVS.

=== Calculation ===
MSI is automatically calculated via vertically integrating maximum values of windshear's vorticity and multiplying it by 1000, accounting for air density spanning across the radar site's beamwidth at the top of the windshear's origin, then vertically integrating the whole of the vortex, with the result divided by depth of beamwidth, to normalize the depth of various mesocyclones.

== MSI of Notable tornadoes ==
- 1999 Dover–Hennessey tornado - MSI value of 7,477
- 1999 Mulhall tornado - MSI value of 4,233
