= Annette Blackburn Ehler =

American civic leader

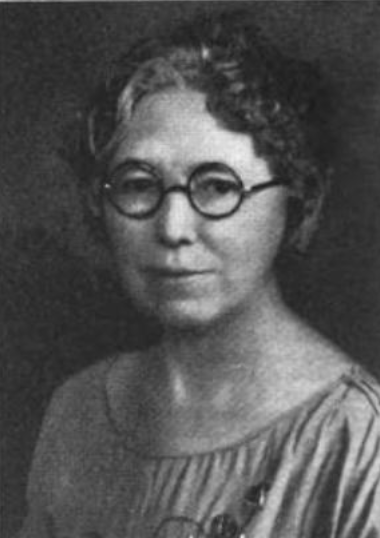
- Ehler, from a 1925 publication
- Born: Annette Belle Blackburn; August 10, 1864; Lawrenceville, Illinois, U.S.
- Died: May 9, 1947 (aged 82); Hennessey, Oklahoma, U.S.
- Other name: Annette Haskett
- Occupations: Civic leader, educator, writer, newspaper publisher

Annette Belle Blackburn Ehler (August 10, 1864 – May 9, 1947) was an American civic leader. She wrote, taught, published a newspaper, and was the first woman to serve as mayor of Hennessey, Oklahoma. She was inducted into the Oklahoma Hall of Fame in 1936.

== Early life and education ==
Blackburn was born in Lawrenceville, Illinois, the daughter of William Blackburn and Amanda Ellen Rawlings Blackburn. She graduated from Ohio State Normal College and Kingfisher College.

== Career ==
Ehler taught school in Illinois, Montana, and Oklahoma. She wrote, lectured, and published the Hennessey Press-Democrat for three years. She served two terms as mayor of Hennessey, Oklahoma, and president of the town's school board. She was a delegate to the Democratic National Convention in 1924. She was an "ardent believer in a qualification vote for all sexes and races." She also believed that she met assassin John Wilkes Booth, living incognito in Oklahoma, long after his apparent death in 1865.

Ehler was a leader of the Order of the Eastern Star and the International Order of the Rainbow for Girls in Oklahoma. She was Eastern Star editor of The Oklahoma Mason. She was active in the Daughters of the American Revolution, the National League of American Pen Women, and the Oklahoma Historical Society. She was inducted into the Oklahoma Hall of Fame in 1936. She created the Pat Hennessey Memorial Garden, and gifted it to the city of Hennessey in 1941.

== Publications ==
Ehler wrote songs, poems, study materials, local history, and a novel.

=== Poetry ===
- "Only a Tramp" (1899)
- "Our Last Farewell" (1900)
- The Firefly (1911, collection of poetry)
- "Your Book of Life" (1921)
- "My Garden" (1924)
- "Silence" (1938)

=== Books and articles ===
- Study Outline of Greek Mythology
- Rhetorical and Literature Outline
- A Text on Grammar
- "Along the Chisholm Trail" (1922 article)
- "The Need for Rainbow" (1925 article)
- Back to the Old Ambraw (novel)
- Echoes of the Chisholm Trail (local history booklet)
- Blue Book of the Eastern Star (19 editions between 1917 and 1945)

== Personal life ==
Blackburn married Marion Allen Haskett in 1892; they had a daughter. Haskett died in 1900, and their daughter died in 1901. In her bereavement she moved to Oklahoma, where her brothers and sister lived. She married Frederick Ehler in 1907. Her second husband died in 1937, and she died after a stroke in 1947, at age 82, at her home in Hennessey.
