= Dover, Oklahoma =

- Town
- Location within Oklahoma Location within the United States
- Coordinates: 35°58′53″N 97°54′39″W
- Country: United States
- State: Oklahoma
- County: Kingfisher

Area
  - Total: 0.31 sq mi (0.80 km^{2})
  - Land: 0.31 sq mi (0.80 km^{2})
  - Water: 0 sq mi (0.00 km^{2})
- Elevation: 1,037 ft (316 m)

Population (2020)
  - Total: 400
  - Density: 1,287.7/sq mi (497.19/km^{2})
- Time zone: UTC-6 (Central (CST))
  - Summer (DST): UTC-5 (CDT)
- ZIP code: 73734
- Area codes: 405/572
- FIPS code: 40-21350
- GNIS feature ID: 2412447

Dover is a town in Kingfisher County, Oklahoma, United States. As of the 2020 census, Dover has a population of 400.

== History ==
The area around Dover was ideal for cattle grazing, By 1884, all the land had been leased to cattlemen. The Red Fork Traders' Ranch had been established near the Chisholm Trail. The land was opened for settlement by the Land Run of 1889, and the trading post was well-placed to benefit from the farmers that settled nearby.

The Rock Island built a track through the Traders' Ranch and constructed abridge across the Cimarron River in October 1889. A settlement called Red Wing grew up around the ranch. On March 1, 1890, a post office was established renaming the community "Dover" after the city in England. By 1893, the community had an estimated 150 residents, growing to about 500 by 1910.

Dover was the site on April 3, 1895, where the outlaw gang known as the Wild Bunch held up a Rock Island train. The gang was unable to open the safe containing $50,000 in army payroll, so they robbed the passengers instead. A posse surprised and scattered the gang around noon. Thus Dover has the distinction of being the place of the last robbery by the Wild Bunch as a gang, although its individual members kept up the robberies and killings until their own demises.

On September 18, 1906, a bridge across the Cimarron River near Dover collapsed beneath a Rock Island train bound for Fort Worth, Texas from Chicago. The bridge was a temporary structure unable to withstand the pressure of debris and high water. Replacement with a permanent structure had been delayed by the railroad for financial reasons. Several sources report that over 100 persons were killed, although this figure is disputed. The true number may be as low as 4.

On May 3rd, 1999, a tornado destroyed about one-third of the town, killing one, and injuring eleven.

== Geography ==
Dover is located 9 miles (14 km) north of Kingfisher.

According to the United States Census Bureau, the town has a total area of 0.3 square miles (0.78 km^{2}), all land.

== Demographics ==
Historical population
Census	Pop.	Note	%±
1980	570		—
1990	376		−34.0%
2000	367		−2.4%
2010	464		26.4%
2020	400		−13.8%
U.S. Decennial Census

=== 2020 census ===
As of the 2020 census, Dover had a population of 400. The median age was 36.5 years. 30.2% of residents were under the age of 18 and 13.5% of residents were 65 years of age or older. For every 100 females there were 95.1 males, and for every 100 females age 18 and over there were 92.4 males age 18 and over.

0.0% of residents lived in urban areas, while 100.0% lived in rural areas.

There were 140 households in Dover, of which 46.4% had children under the age of 18 living in them. Of all households, 44.3% were married-couple households, 22.9% were households with a male householder and no spouse or partner present, and 22.9% were households with a female householder and no spouse or partner present. About 26.4% of all households were made up of individuals and 13.5% had someone living alone who was 65 years of age or older.

There were 163 housing units, of which 14.1% were vacant. The homeowner vacancy rate was 1.1% and the rental vacancy rate was 11.9%.

Racial composition as of the 2020 census
Race	Number	Percent
White	247	61.8%
Black or African American	2	0.5%
American Indian and Alaska Native	8	2.0%
Asian	1	0.2%
Native Hawaiian and Other Pacific Islander	0	0.0%
Some other race	78	19.5%
Two or more races	64	16.0%
Hispanic or Latino (of any race)	165	41.2%

=== 2000 census ===
As of the census of 2000, there were 367 people, 138 households, and 98 families residing in the town. The population density was 1,187.5 inhabitants per square mile (458.5/km^{2}). There were 151 housing units at an average density of 488.6 per square mile (188.6/km^{2}). The racial makeup of the town was 84.74% White, 2.18% African American, 1.91% Native American, 6.54% from other races, and 4.63% from two or more races. Hispanic or Latino of any race were 14.99% of the population.

There were 138 households, out of which 42.0% had children under the age of 18 living with them, 53.6% were married couples living together, 9.4% had a female householder with no husband present, and 28.3% were non-families. 26.1% of all households were made up of individuals, and 13.0% had someone living alone who was 65 years of age or older. The average household size was 2.66 and the average family size was 3.22.

In the town, the population was spread out, with 31.6% under the age of 18, 8.7% from 18 to 24, 30.0% from 25 to 44, 19.3% from 45 to 64, and 10.4% who were 65 years of age or older. The median age was 34 years. For every 100 females, there were 93.2 males. For every 100 females age 18 and over, there were 94.6 males.

The median income for a household in the town was $34,219, and the median income for a family was $36,563. Males had a median income of $24,583 versus $18,636 for females. The per capita income for the town was $17,287. About 11.0% of families and 15.1% of the population were below the poverty line, including 17.8% of those under age 18 and 6.1% of those age 65 or over.
