= Altona, Oklahoma =

- Unincorporated community
- Location within Oklahoma and the United States Altona (the United States)
- Coordinates: 35.78°N 98.17°W
- Country: United States
- State: Oklahoma
- County: Kingfisher
- Time zone: UTC-6 (Central (CST))
  - Summer (DST): UTC-5 (CDT)

Altona is an unincorporated community in Kingfisher County, Oklahoma, United States.

== History ==
The Altona post office was established on October 5, 1892, by James T. Oswalt.

In 1902, a fossiliferous dolomite that overlaid a stratum of shale which originated from the Permian period was named after the town's post office.

On January 31, 1906, The post office was discontinued by order, with mail re-routed to Omega, Oklahoma.

On May 3, 1999, the town was hit by an F3 rated tornado, and caused 4 injuries.
