= Climate of Oklahoma City =

Oklahoma City

Climate chart (precipitation, max. and min. temperature)
J	F	M	A	M	J	J	A	S	O	N	D
1.4 50 29	1.6 55 33	3.1 63 41	3.1 72 50	4.7 80 60	4.9 88 68	2.9 94 72	3.3 93 71	4.1 85 63	3.7 73 52	2 62 40	1.9 51 31
- █ Average max. and min. temperatures in °F
- █ Precipitation totals in inches
- Source: NOAA
Metric conversion
J	F	M	A	M	J	J	A	S	O	N	D
35 10 −2	40 13 0	78 17 5	78 22 10	118 27 15	125 31 20	74 34 22	83 34 22	103 29 17	94 23 11	50 16 4	48 10 −1
- █ Average max. and min. temperatures in °C
- █ Precipitation totals in mm

Oklahoma City lies in a temperate humid subtropical climate (Köppen: Cfa), with frequent variations in weather daily and seasonally, except during the consistently hot and humid summer months. Consistent winds, usually from the south or south-southeast during the summer, help temper the hotter weather. Consistent northerly winds during the winter can intensify cold periods. The normal annual mean temperature is 61.4 °F (16.3 °C); the coolest year was 1895 with a mean of 57.9 °F (14.4 °C), while the warmest 2012 at 64.1 °F (17.8 °C). Precipitation averages 36.52 inches (928 mm) annually, falling on an average 84 days, with the warmer months receiving more; annual precipitation has historically ranged from 15.74 in (400 mm) in 1901 to 56.95 in (1,447 mm) in 2007. The sun shines about 69% of the time, with monthly percent possible sunshine ranging from 60% in December to 80% in July.

== Winter ==
Winters are typically cool, relatively dry, and somewhat brief, albeit highly variable. January has a normal mean temperature of 39.2 °F (4.0 °C), but temperatures reach freezing on an average 71 days and fail to rise above freezing on an average 8.3 days, and, with an average in December through February of 6.3 days reaching 70 °F (21 °C), warm spells are common and most winters see the thermometer rise that high. The last reading 0 °F (−18 °C) or colder occurred on February 18, 2021. The official record low is −17 °F (−27 °C) on February 12, 1899, while the lowest daily maximum is 2 °F (−17 °C) on February 12, 1905 and January 11, 1918; the coldest month on record was January 1930 with a mean temperature of 23.1 °F (−4.9 °C). Snow occurs in almost every winter, with the normal seasonal snowfall being 7.6 inches (19.3 cm); winter accumulation has ranged from trace amounts in 1931−32 and 1934−35 to 25.2 in (64.0 cm) in 1947−48. The most snow in one day was 13.5 inches (34.3 cm) on December 24, 2009.

== Spring ==
In spring (March to early June), Oklahoma City lies in a zone of frequent conflict between warm, moist air from the Gulf of Mexico and cold, dry air from Canada. Furthermore, the "dryline," separating hot, dry air from Mexico and the southwestern U.S. from warm, moist air from the Gulf of Mexico, often spawns strong to severe thunderstorms across central Oklahoma. Accordingly, precipitation sees a marked uptick in spring, not uncommonly accompanied by severe weather, including severe thunderstorms, large hail, and tornadoes, especially from mid-April to early June, with May the highest-risk month. Oklahoma City, and central Oklahoma generally, is one of the most tornado-prone places in the world.

The average date of the last spring freeze is March 29, while the first 90 °F (32 °C) of summer can be expected on May 6.

== Summer ==
Summers are very hot and rather humid, but from mid-June onward, are relatively dry, with less-severe and less-frequent showers and thunderstorms compared to the late-April to early-June period. In many years, long stretches of hot, dry weather, punctuated by occasional shower/thunderstorm activity, predominate. July has a normal mean temperature of 83.0 °F (28.3 °C). On average, temperatures reach 90 °F (32 °C) on 70 days per year and 100 °F (38 °C) on 10.4, and in the worst heat waves may reach the former mark on every day of a month. (Note: The annual number of 90 °F (32 °C)+ days has ranged from 19 in 1906 to 113 in 1998; the corresponding range for 100 °F (38 °C) is 0 as recently as 2021 to 63 in 2011.) The official record high is 113 °F (45 °C) on August 11, 1936 and August 3, 2012, while the highest daily minimum is 84 °F (29 °C) on August 3, 2012; the hottest month on record was July 2011 with a mean temperature of 89.2 °F (31.8 °C), followed closely by August 2011.

== Autumn ==
On average, Oklahoma City experiences a secondary peak in precipitation in September and October, compared to the heat and dryness of July and August. Temperatures cool off quickly in the autumn, especially in November, but daytime temperatures can be warm (26 to 34 °C or 80s to low 90s °F) into mid-October. A testament to the high variability of conditions in autumn is the extreme temperature drop of November 11, 1911, with a daily high and low of 83 and 17 °F (28 and −8 °C), both of which still hold as the record high and low for the date. The last 90 °F (32 °C) of the warm season can be expected on September 26, and the average date of the first freeze in autumn is November 6.

== Severe weather ==
Oklahoma City has a very active severe weather season from March through June, especially during April and May. Located in the center of a region colloquially known as Tornado Alley, Oklahoma City is prone to especially frequent and severe tornadoes, as well as very severe hailstorms and occasional derechoes. Tornadoes have occurred in every month of the year in Oklahoma City, and a secondary smaller peak also occurs during the early autumn, especially in mid-September to late-October. The Oklahoma City metropolitan area is one of the most tornado-prone major cities in the world, with about 150 tornadoes striking within the city limits since 1890. Since the time weather records have been kept, Oklahoma City has been struck by thirteen violent tornadoes, eleven F/EF4's and two F/EF5's. On May 3, 1999 parts of southern Oklahoma City and nearby suburbs suffered one of the most powerful tornadoes on record, an F5 on the Fujita scale, with wind speeds estimated by radar at 318 mph (510 km/h). On May 20, 2013, far southwest Oklahoma City, along with Newcastle and Moore, was hit again by another EF5 tornado; that one was 0.5 to 1.3 miles (0.80 to 2.09 km) wide and killed 23 people. On May 31 of that same year, another outbreak affected the Oklahoma City area, including an EF1 and an EF0 within the city and a tornado several miles west of the city that was 2.6 miles (4.2 km) in width, the widest tornado ever recorded, and it, as was the May 3, 1999 F5, was one of the most powerful tornadoes on record.

== Statistics ==
Climate data for Oklahoma City (Will Rogers World Airport), 1991−2020 normals, (Note: Mean monthly maxima and minima (i.e. the expected highest and lowest temperature readings at any point during the year or given month) calculated based on data at said location from 1991 to 2020.) extremes 1890−present (Note: Official records for Oklahoma City were kept at the Weather Bureau Office from November 1890 to December 1953, and at Will Rogers World Airport since January 1954. For more information, see Threadex)
Month	Jan	Feb	Mar	Apr	May	Jun	Jul	Aug	Sep	Oct	Nov	Dec	Year
Record high °F (°C)	83 (28)	92 (33)	97 (36)	100 (38)	104 (40)	107 (42)	110 (43)	113 (45)	108 (42)	97 (36)	87 (31)	86 (30)	113 (45)
Mean maximum °F (°C)	71.7 (22.1)	77.1 (25.1)	84.2 (29.0)	86.9 (30.5)	92.3 (33.5)	96.4 (35.8)	102.4 (39.1)	101.5 (38.6)	96.2 (35.7)	88.9 (31.6)	79.1 (26.2)	71.2 (21.8)	103.8 (39.9)
Mean daily maximum °F (°C)	49.3 (9.6)	53.8 (12.1)	62.9 (17.2)	71.1 (21.7)	78.9 (26.1)	87.5 (30.8)	93.1 (33.9)	92.2 (33.4)	83.9 (28.8)	72.8 (22.7)	60.7 (15.9)	50.4 (10.2)	71.4 (21.9)
Daily mean °F (°C)	38.2 (3.4)	42.3 (5.7)	51.2 (10.7)	59.3 (15.2)	68.2 (20.1)	76.9 (24.9)	81.7 (27.6)	80.7 (27.1)	72.7 (22.6)	61.1 (16.2)	49.2 (9.6)	40.0 (4.4)	60.1 (15.6)
Mean daily minimum °F (°C)	27.0 (−2.8)	30.8 (−0.7)	39.5 (4.2)	47.5 (8.6)	57.6 (14.2)	66.2 (19.0)	70.3 (21.3)	69.1 (20.6)	61.5 (16.4)	49.4 (9.7)	37.7 (3.2)	29.5 (−1.4)	48.8 (9.3)
Mean minimum °F (°C)	11.7 (−11.3)	15.4 (−9.2)	21.5 (−5.8)	32.3 (0.2)	43.8 (6.6)	56.6 (13.7)	63.6 (17.6)	61.7 (16.5)	48.4 (9.1)	33.8 (1.0)	21.7 (−5.7)	14.3 (−9.8)	7.5 (−13.6)
Record low °F (°C)	−11 (−24)	−17 (−27)	1 (−17)	20 (−7)	32 (0)	46 (8)	53 (12)	49 (9)	35 (2)	16 (−9)	9 (−13)	−8 (−22)	−17 (−27)
Average precipitation inches (mm)	1.32 (34)	1.42 (36)	2.55 (65)	3.60 (91)	5.31 (135)	4.49 (114)	3.59 (91)	3.60 (91)	3.72 (94)	3.32 (84)	1.68 (43)	1.79 (45)	36.39 (924)
Average snowfall inches (cm)	1.8 (4.6)	1.8 (4.6)	0.8 (2.0)	0.0 (0.0)	0.0 (0.0)	0.0 (0.0)	0.0 (0.0)	0.0 (0.0)	0.0 (0.0)	0.0 (0.0)	0.5 (1.3)	1.8 (4.6)	6.7 (17)
Average precipitation days (≥ 0.01 in)	5.0	5.7	6.9	7.9	10.0	8.6	6.0	6.7	7.1	7.5	5.8	5.7	82.9
Average snowy days (≥ 0.1 in)	1.3	1.3	0.4	0.1	0.0	0.0	0.0	0.0	0.0	0.1	0.3	1.4	4.9
Average relative humidity (%)	66.6	65.7	61.3	61.1	67.5	67.2	60.9	61.6	67.1	64.4	67.1	67.8	64.9
Average dew point °F (°C)	23.7 (−4.6)	28.0 (−2.2)	35.2 (1.8)	45.1 (7.3)	55.8 (13.2)	63.7 (17.6)	65.3 (18.5)	64.4 (18.0)	59.5 (15.3)	47.7 (8.7)	37.0 (2.8)	27.5 (−2.5)	46.1 (7.8)
Mean monthly sunshine hours	200.8	189.7	244.2	271.3	295.2	326.1	356.6	329.3	263.7	245.1	186.5	180.9	3,089.4
Mean daily daylight hours	10.1	10.9	12.0	13.1	14.1	14.5	14.3	13.4	12.4	11.3	10.3	9.8	12.2
Percentage possible sunshine	64	62	66	69	68	75	80	79	71	70	60	60	69
Average ultraviolet index	3	4	6	8	9	10	10	9	8	5	3	2	6.4
Source 1: NOAA (relative humidity and sun 1961−1990)
Source 2: Weather Atlas(Daylight-UV)

Climate data for Oklahoma City
Month	Jan	Feb	Mar	Apr	May	Jun	Jul	Aug	Sep	Oct	Nov	Dec	Year
Mean daily daylight hours	10.0	11.0	12.0	13.0	14.0	15.0	14.0	13.0	12.0	11.0	10.0	10.0	12.1
Average Ultraviolet index	3	4	6	8	9	10	10	9	8	5	3	2	6.4
Source: Weather Atlas

See or edit raw graph data.

== See also ==
- Climate of Oklahoma
