= Hennessey, Oklahoma =

- Town
- Motto: "A Light on the Prairie"
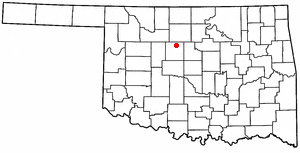
- Location of Hennessey, Oklahoma
- Coordinates: 36°06′20″N 97°53′56″W
- Country: United States
- State: Oklahoma
- County: Kingfisher
- Established: April 22, 1889

Area
  - Total: 3.75 sq mi (9.72 km^{2})
  - Land: 3.71 sq mi (9.60 km^{2})
  - Water: 0.046 sq mi (0.12 km^{2})
- Elevation: 1,158 ft (353 m)

Population (2020)
  - Total: 2,151
  - Density: 580.2/sq mi (224.01/km^{2})
- Time zone: UTC-6 (Central (CST))
  - Summer (DST): UTC-5 (CDT)
- ZIP code: 73742
- Area codes: 405/572
- FIPS code: 40-33700
- GNIS feature ID: 2412746
- Website: hennesseyok.org

Hennessey is a town in Kingfisher County, Oklahoma, United States. As of the 2020 census, Hennessey had a population of 2,151.

== History ==
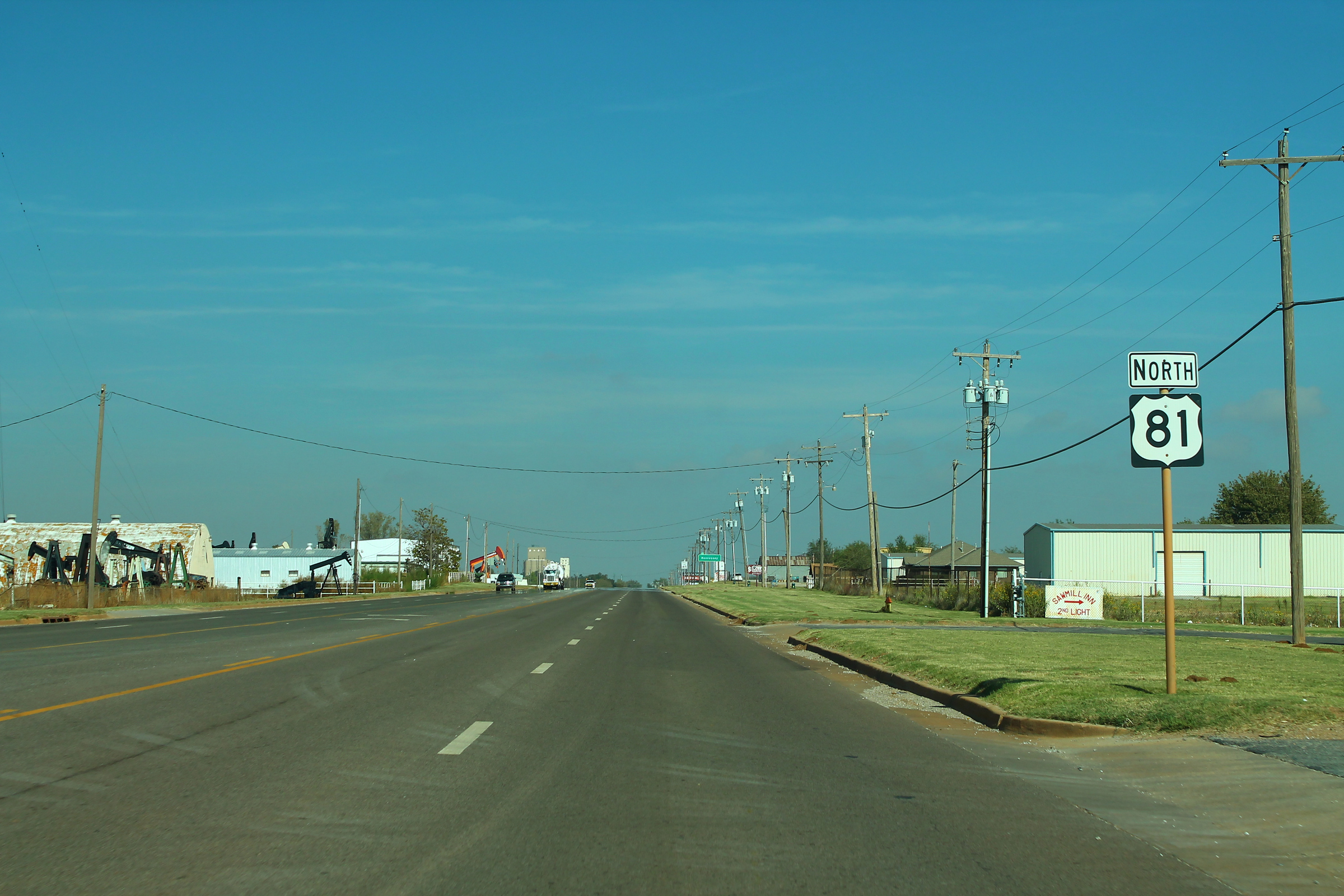
U.S. Route 81 in Hennessey, October 2016

Hennessey is named after Pat Hennessey, an Irish freighter who was killed at the present townsite in April 1874. He was said to have been burned on a wagon wheel, either by native Cheyenne tribesmen or White horse thieves.

The Pat Hennessey Memorial Park can be found at Iowa and Arapaho streets. The location of his body is another story. Pat Hennessey was originally buried next to the location of his death in a shallow grave. Rocks were placed over his body, and teamsters passing by would continue to place markers on his grave. At some point in history Hennessey's body was moved. It is possible his relatives came from Ireland and reclaimed his body. In any case, it is not at the marker site at Memorial Park: excavations there produced no remains.

The town was laid out by the Hennessey Townsite Company after the land run of April 22, 1889. The Chicago, Kansas and Nebraska Railway, which was owned by the Chicago, Rock Island and Pacific Railway, built a line from Kansas through the Cherokee Outlet, and the first train arrived in September 1889. The town was incorporated on June 10, 1890.

Hennessey is the home town of former NFL fullback Leon Crosswhite and actor Nicki Aycox.

== Geography ==
Hennessey is located in northern Kingfisher County on the Chisholm Trail, the historic cattle trail on which is based today's U.S. Route 81. US 81 leads south 18 miles (29 km) to Kingfisher, the county seat, and north 20 miles (32 km) to Enid. Oklahoma State Highway 51 passes through the north side of the town, leading east 48 miles (77 km) to Stillwater and west 23 miles (37 km) to Okeene.

According to the United States Census Bureau, Hennessey has a total area of 3.7 square miles (9.7 km^{2}), of which 0.04 square miles (0.1 km^{2}), or 1.23%, are water.

=== Climate ===
Climate data for Hennessey, Oklahoma
Month	Jan	Feb	Mar	Apr	May	Jun	Jul	Aug	Sep	Oct	Nov	Dec	Year
Mean daily maximum °F (°C)	46.2 (7.9)	51.7 (10.9)	62.2 (16.8)	72.7 (22.6)	81.0 (27.2)	89.9 (32.2)	95.9 (35.5)	94.3 (34.6)	85.4 (29.7)	74.7 (23.7)	59.8 (15.4)	48.8 (9.3)	71.9 (22.2)
Mean daily minimum °F (°C)	23.9 (−4.5)	28.6 (−1.9)	37.2 (2.9)	47.6 (8.7)	56.8 (13.8)	65.6 (18.7)	70.6 (21.4)	68.9 (20.5)	61.0 (16.1)	49.6 (9.8)	37.5 (3.1)	27.3 (−2.6)	47.9 (8.8)
Average precipitation inches (mm)	0.9 (23)	1.2 (30)	2.4 (61)	2.7 (69)	4.7 (120)	4.2 (110)	2.6 (66)	2.9 (74)	4.1 (100)	2.3 (58)	1.9 (48)	1.0 (25)	30.8 (780)
Source 1: weather.com
Source 2: Weatherbase.com

== Demographics ==
Historical population
Census	Pop.	Note	%±
1900	1,367		—
1910	1,665		21.8%
1920	1,310		−21.3%
1930	1,271		−3.0%
1940	1,342		5.6%
1950	1,264		−5.8%
1960	1,228		−2.8%
1970	2,181		77.6%
1980	2,287		4.9%
1990	1,902		−16.8%
2000	2,058		8.2%
2010	2,131		3.5%
2020	2,151		0.9%
U.S. Decennial Census

=== 2020 census ===
As of the 2020 census, Hennessey had a population of 2,151. The median age was 35.4 years. 27.3% of residents were under the age of 18 and 14.6% of residents were 65 years of age or older. For every 100 females there were 97.9 males, and for every 100 females age 18 and over there were 94.8 males age 18 and over.

0.0% of residents lived in urban areas, while 100.0% lived in rural areas.

There were 766 households in Hennessey, of which 38.5% had children under the age of 18 living in them. Of all households, 52.5% were married-couple households, 18.7% were households with a male householder and no spouse or partner present, and 23.1% were households with a female householder and no spouse or partner present. About 26.1% of all households were made up of individuals and 11.6% had someone living alone who was 65 years of age or older.

There were 909 housing units, of which 15.7% were vacant. The homeowner vacancy rate was 4.2% and the rental vacancy rate was 13.3%.

Racial composition as of the 2020 census
Race	Number	Percent
White	1,368	63.6%
Black or African American	15	0.7%
American Indian and Alaska Native	67	3.1%
Asian	9	0.4%
Native Hawaiian and Other Pacific Islander	0	0.0%
Some other race	390	18.1%
Two or more races	302	14.0%
Hispanic or Latino (of any race)	798	37.1%

== High school athletics ==
Girls Cross Country State Champions 2011 Class 2A

Girls Track State Champions 1972 Class 2A 1989 Class 2A 1990 Class 2A 1991 Class A 2011 Class 2A 2012 Class 2A

Boys Track State Champions 2012 Class 2A

Football State Champions 2010 Class 2A 2011 Class 2A

Baseball State Champions 1987 Class 2A

Oklahoma Band Masters State Champions 2011 class 2A 2012 class 2A

== Notable people ==
- Nicki Aycox (1975–2022), actress, musician, born in Hennessey
- Annette Blackburn Ehler (1864–1947), mayor, writer, educator, historian

== See also ==
- List of municipalities in Oklahoma
