= National Register of Historic Places listings in Seminole County, Oklahoma =

Location of Seminole County in Oklahoma

This is a list of the National Register of Historic Places listings in Seminole County, Oklahoma.

This is intended to be a complete list of the properties on the National Register of Historic Places in Seminole County, Oklahoma, United States. The locations of National Register properties for which the latitude and longitude coordinates are included below, may be seen in a map.

There are 18 properties listed on the National Register in the county.

This National Park Service list is complete through NPS recent listings posted March 21, 2025.

== Current listings ==
	Name on the Register	Image	Date listed	Location	City or town	Description
1	Alice Brown House		March 31, 1982 (#82003701)	Chestnut St. 34°56′46″N 96°31′43″W	Sasakwa	
2	Jackson Brown House	Jackson Brown House	June 27, 1980 (#80003299)	1200 S. Muskogee Pl. 35°08′53″N 96°29′25″W	Wewoka	
3	Silas L. Brown House		August 5, 1985 (#85001697)	107 S. Seminole; 35°09′29″N 96°29′12″W	Wewoka	
4	W.E. Grisso Mansion	W.E. Grisso Mansion	January 27, 1975 (#75001573)	612 State Highway 9E; 35°14′50″N 96°39′52″W	Seminole	
5	Home Stake Oil and Gas Company Building	Home Stake Oil and Gas Company Building	May 14, 1986 (#86001094)	315 E. Broadway; 35°13′27″N 96°40′04″W	Seminole	
6	Hotel Aldridge	Hotel Aldridge	May 14, 1986 (#86001083)	3rd St. and Wewoka Ave. 35°09′24″N 96°29′29″W	Wewoka	
7	J. Coody Johnson Building	J. Coody Johnson Building	August 5, 1985 (#85001744)	124 N. Wewoka St. 35°09′35″N 96°29′28″W	Wewoka	
8	Konawa Armory	Konawa Armory	May 20, 1994 (#94000483)	625 N. State St. 34°57′51″N 96°45′05″W	Konawa	
9	Mekasukey Academy		March 28, 1974 (#74001668)	Southwest of Seminole; 35°11′25″N 96°43′18″W	Seminole	
10	Rosenwald Hall	Rosenwald Hall	September 28, 1984 (#84003427)	College St. 35°10′27″N 96°35′56″W	Lima	
11	Roulston-Rogers Site	Roulston-Rogers Site	November 27, 1978 (#78002262)	Address Restricted	Sasakwa	
12	Seminole County Courthouse	Seminole County Courthouse	August 24, 1984 (#84003429)	120 S. Wewoka Ave. 35°09′29″N 96°29′27″W	Wewoka	
13	Seminole High School	Seminole High School	March 31, 2022 (#100007546)	501 North Timmons St. 35°13′39″N 96°40′38″W	Seminole	The city's 1930 former high school building.
14	Seminole Municipal Building	Seminole Municipal Building	September 8, 2015 (#15000580)	401 N. Main St. 35°13′36″N 96°40′07″W	Seminole	
15	Seminole Whipping Tree	Seminole Whipping Tree	May 22, 1981 (#81000468)	120 S. Wewoka Ave. 35°09′29″N 96°29′28″W	Wewoka	
16	Sinclair Loading Rack	Sinclair Loading Rack	August 5, 1985 (#85001698)	U.S. Route 270; 35°12′57″N 96°38′20″W	Seminole	System for loading oil of Sinclair Oil Company into railroad tankcars. Demolished.
17	Strother Memorial Chapel	Strother Memorial Chapel	September 2, 2003 (#03000880)	1201 Van Dr. (inside the Maple Grove Cemetery); 35°14′02″N 96°41′08″W	Seminole	
18	Wewoka Switch and Side Tracks	Wewoka Switch and Side Tracks	September 26, 1985 (#85002475)	State Highway 56; 35°09′39″N 96°29′28″W	Wewoka	

== See also ==
- List of National Historic Landmarks in Oklahoma
- National Register of Historic Places listings in Oklahoma
