= Nobletown, Oklahoma =

Coordinates: 35°12′11″N 96°31′47″W

Nobletown is a populated place in Seminole County, Oklahoma at an elevation of 840 feet. It is about five miles northwest of Wewoka, Oklahoma, the county seat.

Nobletown is centered between Wewoka Lake to the east, and Sportsman Lake, together with the associated Sportsman Lake Recreation Area, to the west.
