= Dewright, Oklahoma =

Ghost town in Oklahoma, US

Dewright
- Ghost town
- Location in Oklahoma
- Coordinates: 35.0850°N 96.7250°W
- Country: United States
- State: Oklahoma
- County: Seminole

Dewright is a former rural settlement and now a ghost town located about seven miles southeast of Maud, in Seminole County, Oklahoma, United States. The town existed primarily during the early 1930s and was part of the region's agricultural and oil boom era.

== History ==
Dewright was established during the late stages of the Greater Seminole Oil Field boom, which began in 1926 and transformed Seminole County into one of the most productive oil fields in the United States. Unlike major boomtowns such as Seminole and Cromwell, Dewright remained a small rural community serving oil workers and farmers in the surrounding area.

The settlement was named for Dewey Wright, its first postmaster, who operated the local post office from its opening on June 24, 1931, until its closure on November 30, 1939. The post office was a critical institution for the community, as mail service often defined a town's official existence during this period.

Dewright never developed beyond a cluster of houses, a general store, and the post office. Its economy relied on subsistence farming and minor oil-related employment. The lack of railroad access and paved roads limited growth, and when oil production declined in the late 1930s, residents moved to larger towns such as Wewoka and Seminole. By the early 1940s, Dewright was effectively abandoned.

== Location and present status ==
The former townsite lies in western Seminole County near the county line with Pottawatomie County, southeast of Maud. Today, no visible structures remain; the area consists of farmland and oil lease roads. Dewright is recognized as a ghost town and is documented in historical records maintained by the Oklahoma Historical Society.

== Legacy ==
Although short-lived, Dewright reflects the pattern of ephemeral communities that emerged during Oklahoma’s oil boom era. These towns often sprang up around drilling activity and disappeared once production declined. Dewright's name survives in postal history and in lists of Seminole County’s vanished settlements.

== See also ==
- Ghost towns in Oklahoma
- Greater Seminole Oil Field
- Seminole County, Oklahoma
- Maud, Oklahoma
- Oil boom towns
