= KWSH =

- Wewoka, Oklahoma; United States
- Frequency: 1260 kHz

Programming
- Format: Country

Ownership
- Owner: One Ten Broadcasting Group, Inc.
- Sister stations: KIRC, KSLE

History
- Former call signs: KSMI (1948–1951)

Technical information
- Licensing authority: FCC
- Facility ID: 65629
- Class: B
- Power: 1,000 watts
- Transmitter coordinates: 35°10′10″N 96°32′30″W
- Translators: K249FH (97.7 MHz, Seminole)

Links
- Public license information: Public file; LMS
- Website: kirc1059.com/stations/

KWSH (1260 AM) is a radio station licensed to serve the community of Wewoka, Oklahoma. The station is owned by One Ten Broadcasting Group, Inc., and airs a country music format.

The station was assigned the call sign KSMI by the Federal Communications Commission on February 25, 1948. The station changed its call sign to KWSH on May 1, 1951.

== Translators ==
Call sign	Frequency	City of license	FID	ERP (W)	HAAT	Class	FCC info
K249FH	(97.7 MHz) FM	Seminole, Oklahoma	202724	250	81 m (266 ft)	D	LMS
