= Vamoosa, Oklahoma =

Coordinates: 34°59′08″N 96°40′12″W

Vamoosa is a populated place in Seminole County, Oklahoma. It is east-northeast of Konawa Reservoir, and less than 6 miles east-northeast of the town of Konawa, Oklahoma. It is situated just east of US Route 377 on EW140 Road. It had a post office from May 19, 1906 to March 20, 1918.

The slang English word vamoose, meaning "depart quickly", originated in the Spanish word vamos, which means "let’s go". There is a theory that Native Americans named the town Vamoosa after the land runs elsewhere in Oklahoma, since they felt they needed to get out and relocate to another part of the state. The name has been a source of interested amusement, as when the Tulsa World asked rhetorically in a travel article, "If you just want to get out of town, what could be more appropriate than Vamoosa?"
