= KSLE =

- Wewoka, Oklahoma; United States
- Broadcast area: Seminole, Oklahoma
- Frequency: 104.7 MHz
- Branding: Planet 104.7

Programming
- Format: Oldies

Ownership
- Owner: One Ten Broadcasting Group, Inc.
- Sister stations: KWSH, KIRC

History
- Former call signs: KWSH-FM
- Call sign meaning: SeminoLE

Technical information
- Licensing authority: FCC
- Facility ID: 77278
- Class: A
- ERP: 1700 watts
- HAAT: 154 meters (506 feet)
- Transmitter coordinates: 35°05′31″N 96°32′29″W

Links
- Public license information: Public file; LMS
- Website: kirc1059.com/stations/

KSLE (104.7 FM, "Planet 104.7") is a radio station licensed to serve Wewoka, Oklahoma. The station is owned by One Ten Broadcasting Group, Inc. It airs an Oldies music format.

The station has been assigned these call letters by the Federal Communications Commission since October 1, 1999.

== Office Location ==
KSLE-FM phone number is 405-273-5753 & 405- 382–0186. KSLE-FM office address is located in the KIRC/ One Ten Broadcasting building at 2 East Main Street in Shawnee, Oklahoma 74804.
