= Seminole Producer =

Newspaper in Oklahoma, US

- Type: Daily newspaper
- Format: Broadsheet
- Owner(s): Stu Phillips
- Editor: Stu Phillips
- Founded: March 1, 1927; 98 years ago
- Headquarters: Seminole, Oklahoma
- Circulation: 5,400
- Website: seminoleproducer.com

The Seminole Producer is a daily newspaper circulated throughout Seminole County, Oklahoma. Founded in 1927 by James T. Jackson and Sadie Jackson, it is the only daily newspaper in Seminole County, and the largest newspaper within an 18-mile radius of Seminole, Oklahoma. The paper currently has a circulation of 5,400.

== History ==
The Seminole Producer was founded on March 1, 1927 by James T. Jackson and his wife Sadie Jackson. They had come to Seminole after selling a printing plant in Kansas. Its owner moved the printing plant to Seminole, Oklahoma, where the Seminole Morning Tribune was established. Upon failure of the Tribune, the plant was sold back to Jackson, who did job printing in order to maintain the Producer before the paper's rise to prominence. Despite a slow start, the Seminole Producer rose in popularity after it reported on corruption cases in the county's police department. The Jacksons owned the Seminole Producer until 1946. In 1946, the paper was purchased by Milt and Tom Phillips. The paper would later purchase and assimilate the Seminole County News in 1948, and the Wewoka Times and Wewoka Democrat in 1950. (Note: At some point, the Seminole Producer acquired the assets of newspapers in Konawa, Oklahoma.) Tom Phillips died of cancer in 1956, and the Wewoka papers were sold. In order to retain employees, Milt sold minority interests to three of his staffers Alex Adwan, Ted Phillips, and Carroll Sciance, with Adwan later selling his share. Carroll continued to partner with Milt until Milt's death in 1979. Carroll continued in partnership with Ted until 1992 when he died. Upon Carroll's death, Ted Phillips' son Stu Phillips took Carroll's place as co-owner with Ted. After Ted Phillips died in 2004, Stu Phillips became the editor and publisher of the Producer.

== Milt Phillips Award ==
The Milt Phillips Award is an annual award given by the Oklahoma Press Association to outstanding journalists in Oklahoma. Established in 1978, the award is named after former Seminole Producer owner Milt Phillips. The award recognizes individuals based on quality publishing, and their service to the local community and state.

== End of Phillips Ownership ==
The unexpected sudden death of Stu Phillips at the age of 55 on December 30, 2018, ended the Phillips family connection with the Producer. The Seminole Economic Development Council (SEDC) realized that the area could lose the paper and the jobs connected to its existence, and put together a plan to save the institution. (Note: SEDC is a public trust that was created to promote economic development in the Seminole area. The Seminole city manager is the executive director of the SEDC, and the mayor and two council members are on the nine-person board of directors.)

The Seminole Community Foundation quickly became involved in helping the SEDC to buy the newspaper business. Foundation President, Shari Carter, said: <Indent>

The Seminole Economic Development Council has reached an agreement in principle to purchase the assets of three Seminole County newspapers following the Dec. 30 death of Stu Phillips, the Seminole Producer's third-generation publisher.

“SEDC is in the job creation and job retention business," said attorney Jack Mattingly Sr., chairman of the Seminole Economic Development Authority. "When it became clear to us that not only were we going to lose jobs but a big piece of our history, we decided to do what we could to save the newspaper."

Assets of the Seminole, Wewoka and Konawa newspapers are included in the pending sales agreement, which the Seminole Economic Development Council worked out with assistance from the Seminole Community Foundation, officials said.

Seminole Community Foundation president, Shari Carter, issued the following statement about her organization's involvement.“It is clear that the newspaper business is tough right now, but we just couldn't allow it to shut its doors without a fight, those employees mean a lot to our city. And collectively the Seminole, Wewoka and Konawa newspapers are an important anchor in our county.”

Steve Saxon, Seminole's city manager and SEDC's executive director, clarified the rescue strategy: "The structure of the acquisition is pretty simple. "We are buying the assets of the company and our intent is to lease or sell those assets to someone with business acumen and experience with publishing. That person or company has not been identified. SEDC has zero intention of running the newspaper."
