= KIRC =

- Seminole, Oklahoma; United States
- Broadcast area: Shawnee, Oklahoma
- Frequency: 105.9 MHz
- Branding: Real Country

Programming
- Format: Country music

Ownership
- Owner: One Ten Broadcast Group, Inc.
- Sister stations: KWSH, KSLE

History
- Call sign meaning: Keeping It Real Country

Technical information
- Licensing authority: FCC
- Facility ID: 50351
- Class: A
- ERP: 4,400 watts
- HAAT: 117 meters (384 ft)
- Transmitter coordinates: 35.30778°N 96.75500°W

Links
- Public license information: Public file; LMS
- Website: kirc1059.com

KIRC 105.9 FM is a radio station licensed to Seminole, Oklahoma, USA. The station broadcasts a country music format and is owned by One Ten Broadcast Group, Inc.
