= Lima Rosenwald School =

School in Oklahoma, US, 1921 to 1966

- Rosenwald Hall
- U.S. National Register of Historic Places
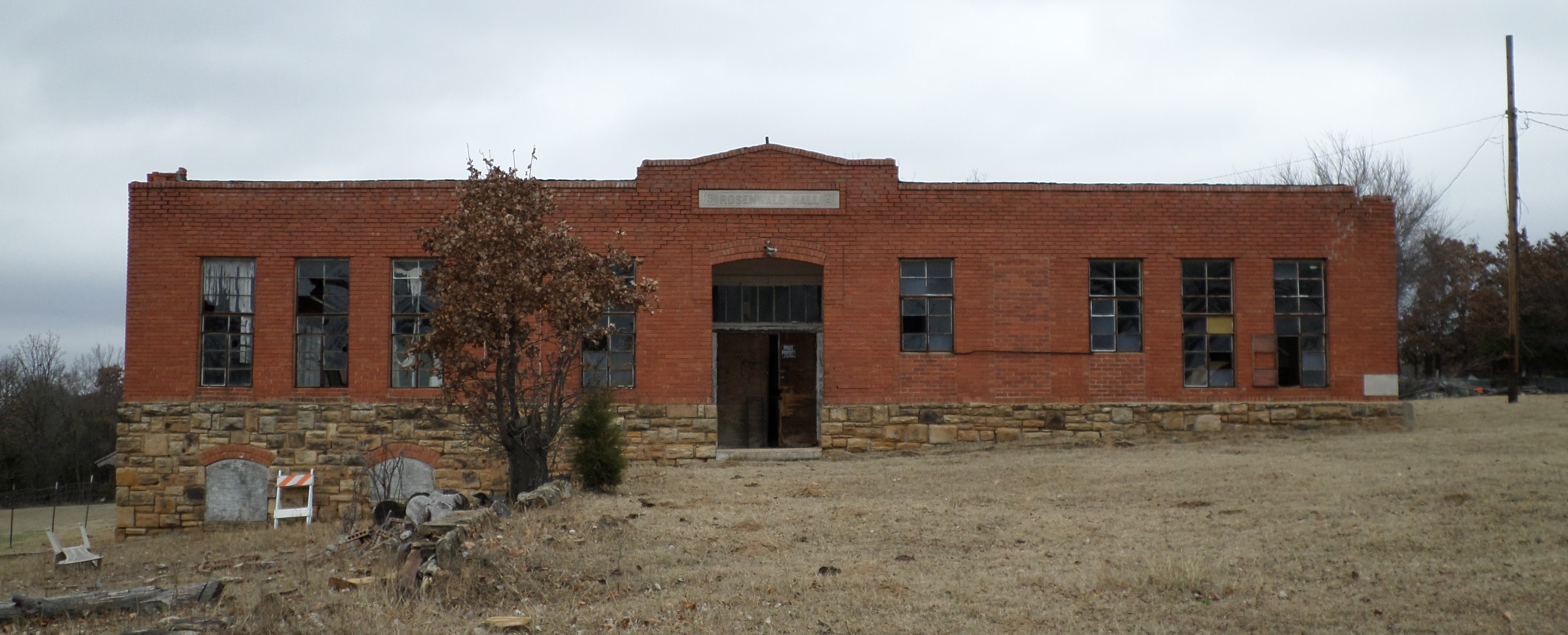
- Location: College Street, Lima, Seminole County, Oklahoma, U.S.
- Coordinates: 35.1742°N 96.5988°W
- Built: 1921
- Part of: Educational Resources of All-Black Towns in Oklahoma
- NRHP reference No.: 84003427
- Added to NRHP: September 28, 1984

Lima Rosenwald School (1921–1966), also known as Rosenwald Hall, was a Rosenwald school built in 1921 in Lima, Oklahoma, U.S.. It has been listed on the National Register of Historic Places (NHRP) since September 28, 1984, for significant contributions to Black social history. Additionally it is part of the NRHP survey, "Educational Resources of All-Black Towns in Oklahoma" from 1984.

== History ==
This school served the all-Black community of Lima from 1921 to 1966, as the only elementary school, a period of 45 years. Afters the school closure from 1966 until 1985, the property was used as a day care center, and was still owned by the school district. It was later used as a town hall briefly, before being abandoned.

The Lima Rosenwald School is the only remaining school building in any of the existing thirteen all-Black towns in Oklahoma, constructed with funds by the Rosenwald Fund. There once were 5,000 or so Rosenwald Schools in the United States, serving Black American students.

== See also ==
- List of Rosenwald schools
- National Register of Historic Places listings in Seminole County, Oklahoma
