= Vance Trimble =

American journalist (1913–2021)

- Born: Vance Henry Trimble; July 6, 1913; Harrison, Arkansas, U.S.
- Died: June 16, 2021 (aged 107); Wewoka, Oklahoma, U.S.
- Known for: Pulitzer Prize-winning journalist and author

Vance Henry Trimble (July 6, 1913 – June 16, 2021) was an American journalist. He won a Pulitzer Prize for national reporting in recognition of his exposé of nepotism and payroll abuse in the U.S. Congress. Trimble worked in the newspaper business for over fifty years. He was inducted into the Oklahoma Journalism Hall of Fame in 1974. He published numerous books after his retirement.

== Early life ==
Vance Henry Trimble was born July 6, 1913, in Harrison, Arkansas. His mother was a writer, and his father was a lawyer and town mayor. The family fled to Oklahoma in 1920 after their lives were endangered by civil unrest in the wake of a railroad strike.

Mr. Trimble began working as a cub reporter at age 14 in Okemah, Oklahoma, and while attending high school in Wewoka. He graduated in 1931 and was married a year later to Elzene Miller. [2] In high school, Trimble was the editor of the school newspaper as well as a full-time reporter for the Multan Times Democratic as a courthouse reporter, sports editor, and city editor. At age eighteen, Trimble married Elzene Miller on January 9, 1932. The two met in high school when they both worked on the school newspaper. Elzene worked at a florist shop and Trimble lost his job a week after they wed, which led to their cross country travels in order to find employment.

== Career ==
During the American Great Depression, Trimble worked wherever he could write. He maintained two to three newspaper jobs around the Seminole and Maud area, but only for a limited amount of time. Eventually, Trimble and his wife took to the road to find him a newspaper job. Along the way Trimble would repair typewriters, adding machines, and cash registers for money. After a year and a half, Trimble got jobs in Muskogee, Tulsa, and Okmulgee. The dailies he worked for include the Seminole Morning News, the Seminole Producer, the Okmulgee Times and the Muskogee Phoenix. Trimble also worked as financial editor of the Tulsa Tribune, and as editor of the Maud Enterprise. After being fired for joining the Newspaper Guild, Trimble went to work for The Beaumont Enterprise and The Port Arthur News in Texas.

In 1939, Trimble joined Scripps Howard as a copy editor for the Houston Press. Within six months, he was promoted to city editor. During World War II, he was assigned to the Army Signal Corps and served as editor of Camp Beale base's newspaper near Marysville, California, for two years. Thereafter, he and his family returned to Houston, "where he had a new home built on a small lot." He was appointed managing editor of the Press in 1950.

In 1955, Trimble was transferred to the Scripps Howard National Bureau in Washington, D.C. as night editor. He found this role to be duller than his previous job in Houston and decided to look for stories to investigate outside of his normal requirements. He came across a book by Raymond Clapper about nepotism in the United States Congress that had been published thirty years prior. After looking into current payrolls, he found that around twenty percent of Congress had family members on their payroll. Following its publication in The Washington Daily News, Trimble had a daily story for six months. As a result, then-Senate Majority Leader Lyndon Johnson decided to open up the payroll records of the U.S. Senate to bring them up to date.

As a result of his work, Trimble was awarded the 1960 Pulitzer Prize for National Reporting, the Sigma Delta Chi Award for Washington coverage, and the Raymond Clapper Memorial Award – referred to as the "triple crown". Trimble remained in Washington until 1963, when he was appointed editor of The Kentucky Post, a regional edition of The Cincinnati Post based in Covington, Kentucky. He drastically improved the paper during his time as editor. Two of his greatest mentors in the newspaper business were Walker Stone and Paul Miller. Trimble served at The Kentucky Post until 1979.

Trimble appeared on the CBS television program, I've Got a Secret, on the May 4, 1960 episode. His secret was "We all won Pulitzer Prizes this week."

== Retirement ==
Trimble constructed a monument to his wife after her death, dubbed the Oakwood Singing Tower, where she was buried in Wewoka. Though he had retired in Kentucky, Trimble moved back to Wewoka to be closer to his wife even in death. When asked the secret to a long life, Trimble responded, "stay in love." He published several books after leaving the newspaper business and even worked to have them available as e-books. Trimble and his wife donated $25,000 to the Wewoka Public Library for an expansion to hold approximately 5,000 books being donated from the couple's personal library.

== Personal life ==
Trimble married Elzene Miller in 1932. Together, they had one child, Carol Ann Trimble Nordheimer, who predeceased him in February 2021.They remained married for 67 years until her death on July 5, 1999.

== Published works ==
Along with being an award-winning journalist, Trimble published numerous books, including:

- The Astonishing Mr. Scripps: The Turbulent Life of America's Penny Press Lord ISBN 9780813806792
- Heroes, Plain Folks, and Skunks: The Life and Times of Happy Chandler ISBN 9780933893740
- Sam Walton: The Inside Story of America's Richest Man ISBN 9780451171610
- The Uncertain Miracle: The History of Hyperbaric Medicine ISBN 9780385045827
- Ronald Reagan, the Man from Main Street, USA ISBN 9780880140256
- The Scripps Howard Handbook, 3rd rev. ed.
- Faith in My Star: A Selection of His Own Words That Showcases the Vision and Vitality of E. W. Scripps
- Overnight Success: Federal Express and Frederick Smith, Its Renegade Creator ISBN 9780517585108
- Alice & J.F.B.: The Hundred-Year Saga of Two Seminole Chiefs ISBN 9780970539946
- Bing Crosby: Love & Mystery
- An Empire Undone: The Wild Rise and Hard Fall of Chris Whittle ISBN 9781559723091
- Choctaw Kisses, Bullets and Blood ISBN 9780970539960
- Poetry With My Love (ed.)
- Will Rogers and His Daredevil Movie ISBN 9781477578513
