= Seminole County Courthouse =

Seminole County Courthouse may refer to:

- Seminole County Courthouse (Georgia), Donalsonville, Georgia
- Seminole County Courthouse (Oklahoma), Wewoka, Oklahoma
