= Dixon, Oklahoma =

Census-designated place in Seminole County, Oklahoma

Coordinates: 35°09′34″N 96°31′18″W

Dixon is a census-designated place in Seminole County, Oklahoma, at an elevation of 863 feet. As of the 2020 census, Dixon had a population of 168. It is less than two miles west of Wewoka, Oklahoma, the county seat. It is located on Business 270, being an offshoot of US Route 270 which bypasses Dixon to the west and south.

== Demographics ==
=== 2020 census ===
As of the 2020 census, Dixon had a population of 168. The median age was 42.5 years. 23.2% of residents were under the age of 18 and 17.3% of residents were 65 years of age or older. For every 100 females there were 93.1 males, and for every 100 females age 18 and over there were 81.7 males age 18 and over.

0.0% of residents lived in urban areas, while 100.0% lived in rural areas.

There were 73 households in Dixon, of which 26.0% had children under the age of 18 living in them. Of all households, 34.2% were married-couple households, 17.8% were households with a male householder and no spouse or partner present, and 37.0% were households with a female householder and no spouse or partner present. About 35.6% of all households were made up of individuals and 12.3% had someone living alone who was 65 years of age or older.

There were 91 housing units, of which 19.8% were vacant. The homeowner vacancy rate was 0.0% and the rental vacancy rate was 6.7%.

Racial composition as of the 2020 census
Race	Number	Percent
White	77	45.8%
Black or African American	27	16.1%
American Indian and Alaska Native	42	25.0%
Asian	4	2.4%
Native Hawaiian and Other Pacific Islander	0	0.0%
Some other race	3	1.8%
Two or more races	15	8.9%
Hispanic or Latino (of any race)	10	6.0%

== Education ==
It is in the Wewoka Public Schools school district.
