= Oleta Crain =

- Born: Oleta Lawanda Crain; September 8, 1913; Earlsboro, Oklahoma, U.S.
- Died: November 7, 2007 (aged 94); Denver, Colorado, U.S.
- Military career
- Allegiance: United States of America
- Branch: United States Army, United States Air Force
- Service years: 1943–1963
- Rank: Major
- Awards: Air Force Longevity Service Award with four bronze oak leaf clusters United States Department of Labor Distinguished Service Award; Colorado Women's Hall of Fame (1988)
- Other work: Regional administrator, United States Women's Bureau, Denver (1984–1998)

Oleta Lawanda Crain (September 8, 1913 – November 7, 2007) was an African-American military officer, federal civil servant, and advocate for black women's rights and desegregation. Out of 300 women nationwide who entered officer training in the U.S. military in 1943, she was one of the three African Americans. She served in the United States Air Force for 20 years, retiring with the rank of major. In 1964 she began working for the United States Department of Labor in Washington, D.C., becoming regional administrator of its Women's Bureau in Denver, Colorado, in 1984. She traveled and spoke extensively to women about employment rights, wages, and career opportunities. She received numerous awards and honors, and was inducted into the Colorado Women's Hall of Fame in 1988.

== Early life and education ==
Oleta Lawanda Crain was born to V. Paula Crain in Earlsboro, Oklahoma, and grew up in Wewoka. She graduated from Douglass High School and studied at Langston University for three years, but received her bachelor's degree in social science from Lincoln University in Jefferson City, Missouri. She later earned an undergraduate degree in business administration from the University of Maryland's extension university in Heidelberg, Germany.

She took courses at the John F. Kennedy School of Government at Harvard University, Cambridge University in England, and the University of Vienna School of International Relations in Austria. After joining the civil service, she earned her master's degree in public administration at Northeastern University.

== Military career ==
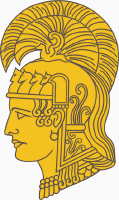
Pallas Athene, official insignia of the Women's Army Corps

In the early 1940s Crain taught gym and history in a segregated school in Hugo, Oklahoma. She decided to move to Colorado to find better-paying work and in 1942 obtained a job at the Denver Ordnance Plant cleaning toilets. She was inspired to enlist after seeing a Women's Army Auxiliary Corps poster calling for women to join military bands to aid the war effort. Upon enlisting, however, she learned that they were not seeking black women. Crain completed basic training and then applied to officer training. She was one of three black women out of 300 women nationwide to enter officer training in 1943.

Crain was promoted to corporal in December 1942 and to company leader of an African-American unit in February 1943. In September, she was discharged from the Women's Army Auxiliary Corps so she could enter regular service in the Women's Army Corps as an Air Force Second Lieutenant.

Crain was constantly exposed to racial discrimination in the army. For example, as officers in training, the black women were not allowed to sleep in the same barracks as the white women, but were housed in private rooms. Nor were they permitted to use the showers at the same time as whites. When Crain would take her African-American company to the swimming pool for their weekly exercises, they were usually informed that "the schedule had been changed". If they did get to swim, the pool would be cleaned the following day. Crain often joked about the discrimination, telling a journalist who was coming to interview her, "The building has two elevators. Mine is at the back".

First Lieutenant Crain was retained in the U.S. military after World War II. The Pentagon asked her to stay following the desegregation of the army "because she got along so well with the troops". She was promoted to captain in May 1948 and was transferred to Westover Air Force Base in Massachusetts to work in intelligence. When she was accused of being a communist by her superior officer, Crain underwent months of investigations and emerged with a top-secret security clearance.

She later served as personnel director at Elmendorf Air Force Base in Anchorage, Alaska (1951), test control officer at an American base in Ruislip, England (1952–1955), and manpower officer at Lindsey Air Station in Germany. She retired from active duty in June 1963 with the rank of major.

== Federal civil service career ==
In 1964, Crain was hired by the United States Department of Labor in Washington, D.C. as a manpower development specialist. She moved to the Boston office to serve as associate regional administrator for the agency's Office of Job Service for the New England states; at the same time, she earned her master's degree at Northeastern University and taught night school there for five years. By 1974 she had advanced to the post of women's program coordinator and equal employment opportunity officer for the Boston office, and spoke to women around the country about their employment rights.

In 1984, she was transferred to Denver, Colorado, to serve as regional administrator of the agency's Women's Bureau for the states of Colorado, Montana, North Dakota, South Dakota, Utah, and Wyoming. Focusing on improving employment conditions, wages, and career options for women, she interacted with both individuals and women's groups. She also supervised conferences on "child care, health benefits, job training, working conditions, and earnings ratios". She retired in December 1998.

== Awards and honors ==
Crain received an Air Force Longevity Service Award with four bronze oak leaf clusters, a Distinguished Career Service award from the United States Department of Labor, and a Martin Luther King Jr. Humanitarian Award. Kentucky Governor Edward Breathitt conferred on her the honor of Kentucky Colonel. Crain was inducted into the Colorado Women's Hall of Fame in 1988.

The U.S. Department of Labor posthumously cited her contribution during Black History Month in 2018, whose theme was "African Americans in Times of War".

== Death and legacy ==
Crain died in Denver on November 7, 2007, at the age of 94.

Crain donated her collection of documents and memorabilia from her service in the Women's Army Auxiliary Corps and the United States Air Force during the 1940s to the Blair-Caldwell African American Research Library in Denver.

The Denver chapter of Delta Sigma Theta sorority, of which Crain was a member, established the Oleta Lawanda Crain Scholarship in her honor. The $2,000 scholarship is awarded to female high-school seniors from Missouri, Oklahoma, and California who plan to study in a historically black college. The Oleta Crain Enrichment Academy Community Center in Denver was also named in her honor.

== Sources ==
- Beaton, Gail M. (2012). Colorado Women: A History. University Press of Colorado. ISBN 978-1607322078.
- Reid, Careth; Beckford, Ruth (2017). The Picture Man: From the Collection of Bay Area Photographer E.F. Joseph, 1927–1979. Arcadia Publishing. ISBN 978-1467125659.
- Varnell, Jeanne (1999). Women of Consequence: The Colorado Women's Hall of Fame. Big Earth Publishing. ISBN 1555662145.
