= Sportsman Lake =

Lake in Oklahoma, USA

Coordinates: 35.211°N 96.550°W

Sportsman Lake is a 354-acre flood control and recreation lake, with 15 miles of shoreline, located in central Oklahoma. It is situated to the east of the town of Seminole and northwest of Wewoka, the Seminole County seat.

The Sportsman Lake Recreational Facility, being the associated 1400-acre wildlife refuge surrounding the lake, includes boat docks and ramps; primitive campsites as well as RV sites; equestrian trails and facilities; and, other amenities.
