= Konawa Reservoir =

- Location within Oklahoma Location within the United States
- Location: Seminole County, Oklahoma, United States
- Coordinates: 34°57′35″N 96°42′26″W
- Lake type: reservoir
- Primary inflows: Jumper Creek
- Primary outflows: Jumper Creek
- Basin countries: United States
- Surface area: 1,350 acres (550 ha)
- Average depth: 17 ft (5.2 m)
- Max. depth: 49.8 ft (15.2 m)
- Water volume: 23,000 acre⋅ft (28 hm^{3})
- Shore length^{1}: 20 mi (32 km)
- Surface elevation: 924 ft (282 m)
- Settlements: Konawa, Oklahoma
- ^{1} Shore length is not a well-defined measure.

Konawa Reservoir (also known as Konawa Lake or Lake Konawa) is a reservoir located in Seminole County, Oklahoma. The lake covers approximately 1,350 acres (5.5 km^{2}) and has a capacity of 23,000 acre-feet (28,000,000 m^{3}). It is owned by Oklahoma Gas and Electric (OG&E) Company. and was constructed in 1968-70, to provide cooling for a nearby gas-fired electric power generation plant. It impounds Jumper Creek, about 2 miles (3.2 km) east of the city of Konawa, Oklahoma.

== Description ==
Konawa Reservoir supplies cooling water for a gas-fired electric power generation plant owned by Oklahoma Gas and Electric (OG&E) Company and located in Seminole County, Oklahoma. The plant has three steam-driven turbine generators and a gas turbine with a combined capacity of 1,534 megawatts (MWe). When the three main steam-driven generators are on-line, the plant must circulate a million gallons of water per minute (GPM) through its exhaust steam condensers.

The reservoir has a surface area of 1,350 acres (5.5 km^{2}), a shoreline of 20 miles (32 km) and a rated capacity of 23,000 acre-feet (28,000,000 m^{3}). The mean depth is 17 feet (5.2 m) and the maximum depth is 49.8 feet (15.2 m). The pool surface elevation is 924 feet (282 m) above mean sea level. The lake level is maintained by pumping water from the South Canadian River as needed.

== Recreation ==
Rod and reel fishing is allowed at Konawa. State fishing laws apply and a valid fishing license is required. Water skiers and personal watercraft are also allowed to use the lake. Houseboats are prohibited.

== Wildlife ==
In 2003, Konawa ranked first among Oklahoma Lakes larger than 1,000 acres in the production of Largemouth bass. Other species of fish include:Channel Catfish, Flathead Catfish, Hybrid Striped Bass, Sunfish and White Bass.
