= J. Coody Johnson Building =

- U.S. National Register of Historic Places
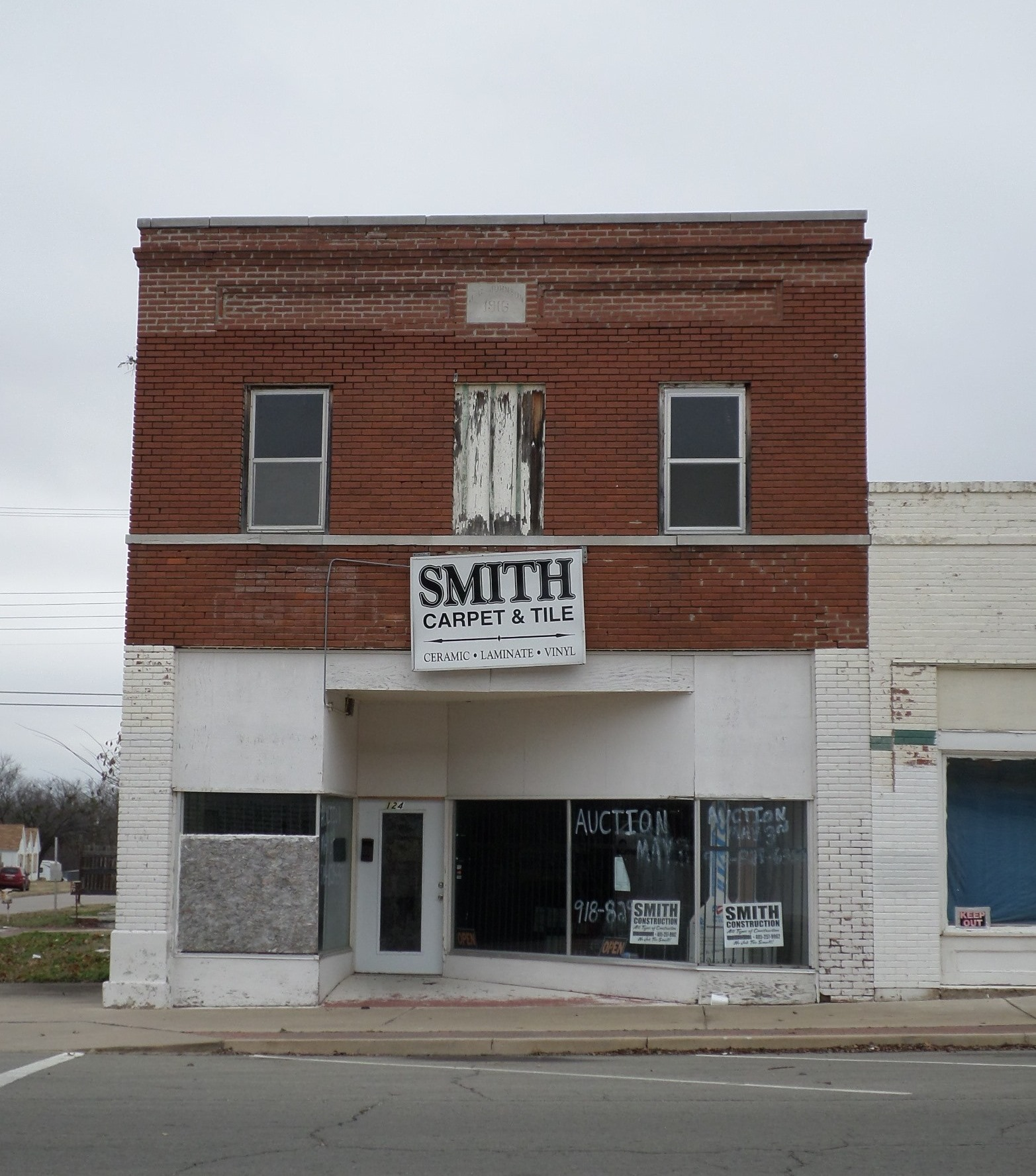

- Location within Oklahoma Location within the United States
- Location: 124 N. Wewoka St., Wewoka, Oklahoma
- Coordinates: 35°09′35″N 96°29′28″W
- Area: less than one acre
- Built: 1916
- Built by: Witherspoon & Woods
- NRHP reference No.: 85001744
- Added to NRHP: August 5, 1985

The J. Coody Johnson Building, at 124 N. Wewoka St. in Wewoka, Oklahoma, was built in 1916. It was listed on the National Register of Historic Places in 1985.

It was deemed significant for its association with J. Coody Johnson, a grandson of slaves to the Creek Nation who became a Howard University-educated lawyer and who represented the Creek Nation before the U.S. Supreme Court.

In 1916, he had this two-story building on Wewoka Street built to house his law office. It later held offices of the Black Panther Oil Company, the first black-owned petroleum company in Oklahoma.

It is a two-story, 24 by 60 feet (7.3 m × 18.3 m), commercial building with a parapeted, sloped roof. It has brick finished walls, with brick laid in running bond on three sides and common bond on the rear.

The building was built by Witherspoon & Woods, a builder active in Oklahoma at the time.
