= Silas L. Brown House =

- U.S. National Register of Historic Places
- Location within Oklahoma Location within the United States
- Location: 107 S. Seminole, Wewoka, Oklahoma
- Coordinates: 35°09′29″N 96°29′12″W
- Area: less than one acre
- Built by: Silas Brown
- NRHP reference No.: 85001697
- Added to NRHP: August 5, 1985

The Silas L. Brown House, at 107 S. Seminole in Wewoka, Oklahoma, was built about 1910. It was listed on the National Register of Historic Places in 1985.

It was deemed significant for association with Silas L. Brown, the first black dentist in Wewoka, and as one of the oldest and best-preserved homes in the black community of Wewoka.

It is a two-story clapboarded building, about 25 by 60 feet (7.6 m × 18.3 m) in plan, with a hipped roof and an offset gable on its front facade. It has a one-story open porch and a one-story wing.
