= Earlsboro, Oklahoma =

- Town
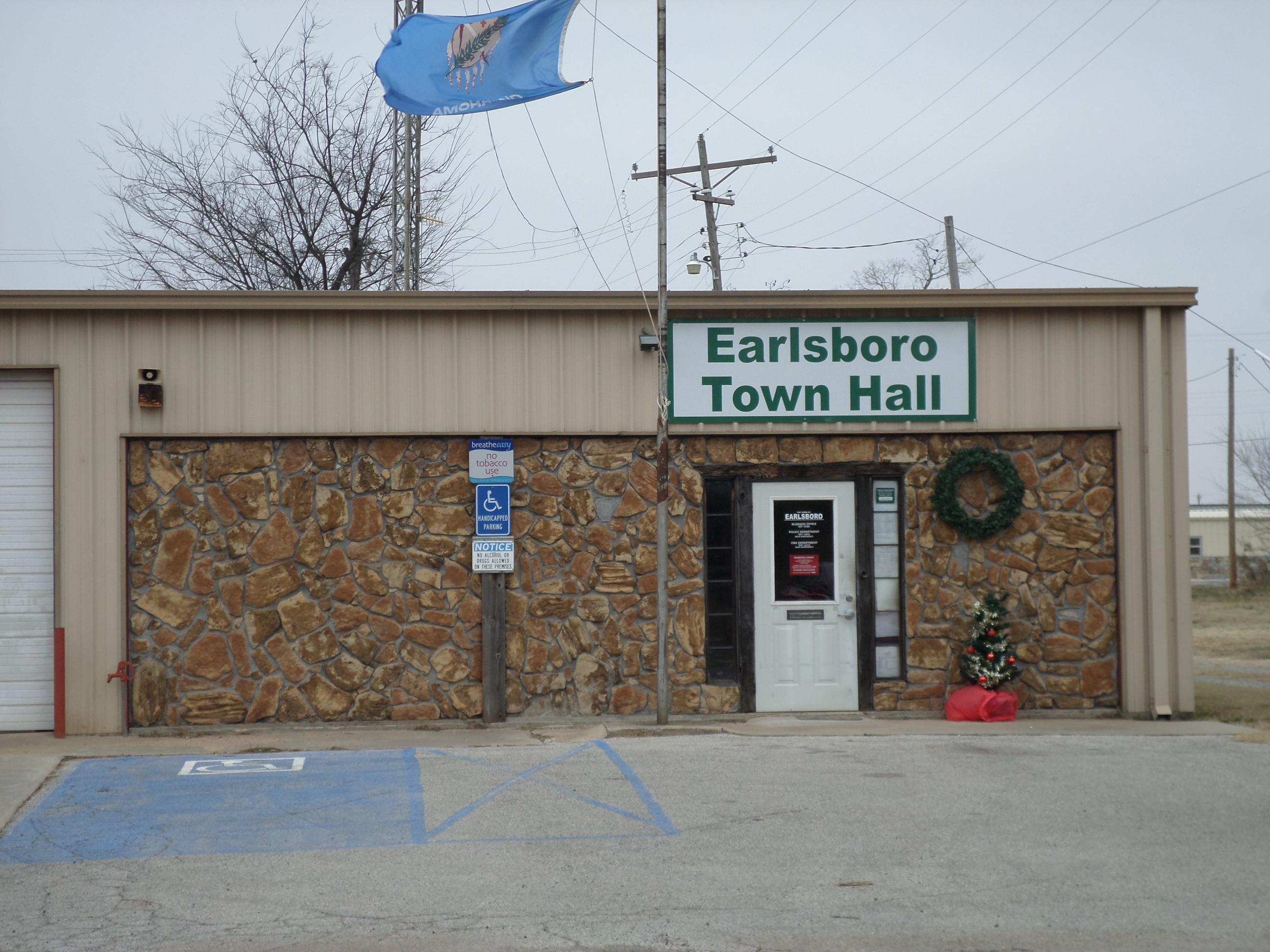
- Earlsboro Town Hall
- Nickname: The Boro
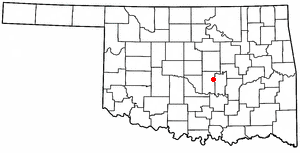
- Location of Earlsboro, Oklahoma
- Coordinates: 35°19′41″N 96°48′05″W
- Country: United States
- State: Oklahoma
- County: Pottawatomie

Government
  - Mayor: LaCosta Ann Rawls

Area
  - Total: 9.31 sq mi (24.11 km^{2})
  - Land: 9.29 sq mi (24.07 km^{2})
  - Water: 0.015 sq mi (0.04 km^{2})
- Elevation: 1,017 ft (310 m)

Population (2020)
  - Total: 594
  - Density: 63.9/sq mi (24.68/km^{2})
- Time zone: UTC-6 (Central (CST))
  - Summer (DST): UTC-5 (CDT)
- ZIP code: 74840
- Area code: 405
- FIPS code: 40-22500
- GNIS feature ID: 2412458

Earlsboro is a town in Pottawatomie County, Oklahoma, United States. The population was 594 by the 2020 United States census. It was once called "...the town that whisky built and oil broke."

== History ==
The town of Earlsborough (as it was spelled on the town plat) began in 1891, when the Choctaw Coal and Railway (later the Choctaw, Oklahoma and Gulf Railroad) built a line west from the Seminole Nation into Oklahoma Territory. The town was located one-half mile inside Oklahoma Territory. It was named for James Earls, a local African American who had served as an orderly for Confederate General Joseph Wheeler during the Civil War. The spelling of the town name changed when the Earlsboro post office opened on June 12, 1895.

The town had an economic boom from the outset because Indian Territory was legally "dry," but Oklahoma Territory was not. The first three businesses were saloons, and it was said that 90 percent of the merchants were engaged in liquor sales. By 1905, the town had a population estimated at 500. Many customers were visitors from Indian Territory.

Statehood brought prohibition to all of Oklahoma, and the population of Earlsboro quickly dropped to 387. The local economy subsequently relied on agriculture instead of liquor. Oil was struck nearby on March 1, 1926. The first well produced 200 barrels a day. News of the strike attracted workers, and the town population increased to an estimated ten thousand people within two months. The ensuing boom led to construction of a one hundred thousand dollar hotel, a large theater, and many different kinds of business. In 1929, the town passed a $225,000 bond issue to construct a water and sewer system. The population was officially 1,950 at the 1930 census.

The oil boom turned into a bust when production declined precipitously in 1932. The newcomers, now deeply in debt, fled the scene, abandoning homes and businesses. The city went into bankruptcy, since it could no longer pay its debts. In 1959 the Daily Oklahoman reported that Earlsboro "was the town that whisky built and oil broke."

On May 4, 2022, an EF2 tornado struck the southeastern part of town before looping around and striking the eastern half of the town, damaging homes, power lines, and buildings. An additional EF1 tornado began near the starting point of the first tornado, causing additional damage as it moved east.

== Geography ==
According to the United States Census Bureau, the town has a total area of 9.2 square miles (24 km^{2}), of which 9.2 square miles (24 km^{2}) is land and 0.04 square miles (0.10 km^{2}) (0.22%) is water.

== Demographics ==
Historical population
Census	Pop.	Note	%±
1910	638		—
1920	317		−50.3%
1930	1,950		515.1%
1940	486		−75.1%
1950	278		−42.8%
1960	257		−7.6%
1970	248		−3.5%
1980	266		7.3%
1990	535		101.1%
2000	633		18.3%
2010	628		−0.8%
2020	594		−5.4%
U.S. Decennial Census

=== 2020 census ===
As of the 2020 census, Earlsboro had a population of 594. The median age was 40.3 years. 26.4% of residents were under the age of 18 and 17.2% of residents were 65 years of age or older. For every 100 females there were 100.0 males, and for every 100 females age 18 and over there were 98.6 males age 18 and over.

0.0% of residents lived in urban areas, while 100.0% lived in rural areas.

There were 228 households in Earlsboro, of which 35.5% had children under the age of 18 living in them. Of all households, 50.4% were married-couple households, 21.9% were households with a male householder and no spouse or partner present, and 21.1% were households with a female householder and no spouse or partner present. About 25.5% of all households were made up of individuals and 11.9% had someone living alone who was 65 years of age or older.

There were 252 housing units, of which 9.5% were vacant. The homeowner vacancy rate was 1.6% and the rental vacancy rate was 0.0%.

Racial composition as of the 2020 census
Race	Number	Percent
White	395	66.5%
Black or African American	33	5.6%
American Indian and Alaska Native	68	11.4%
Asian	0	0.0%
Native Hawaiian and Other Pacific Islander	0	0.0%
Some other race	7	1.2%
Two or more races	91	15.3%
Hispanic or Latino (of any race)	24	4.0%

=== 2010 census ===
As of the census of 2010, there were 628 people living in the town. The population density was 68 inhabitants per square mile (26/km^{2}). There were 260 housing units at an average density of 27 per square mile (10/km^{2}). The racial makeup of the town was 70.46% White, 11.22% African American, 12.16% Native American, 0.32% Asian, 0.16% from other races, and 5.69% from two or more races. Hispanic or Latino of any race were 1.42% of the population.

There were 229 households, out of which 34.2% had children under the age of 18 living with them, 68.0% were married couples living together, 8.8% had a female householder with no husband present, and 19.7% were non-families. 18.0% of all households were made up of individuals, and 10.1% had someone living alone who was 65 years of age or older. The average household size was 2.78 and the average family size was 3.13.

In the town, the population was spread out, with 25.8% under the age of 18, 11.1% from 18 to 24, 25.6% from 25 to 44, 23.1% from 45 to 64, and 14.5% who were 65 years of age or older. The median age was 37 years. For every 100 females, there were 89.5 males. For every 100 females age 18 and over, there were 91.1 males.

The median income for a household in the town was $28,214, and the median income for a family was $32,396. Males had a median income of $30,956 versus $15,865 for females. The per capita income for the town was $12,488. About 11.3% of families and 12.6% of the population were below the poverty line, including 9.2% of those under age 18 and 20.7% of those age 65 or over.

== Education ==
Most of the town is within the Earlsboro Public Schools school district, while some parts are in the Strother Public Schools district, and some are in South Rock Creek Public School district (elementary).

== Notable residents ==
- Oleta Crain, African-American military officer and federal civil servant
- Ival Goodman, MLB all-star
- Joe Liggins, R&B pianist
- Jimmy Liggins, R&B guitarist and brother of Joe Liggins
- Ernest McFarland, Governor of Arizona and Senate Majority Leader from Arizona
- Willie Stargell, Hall of Fame American baseball player

== Notable events ==
The podcast Song Salad, with hosts Shannon and Scott (featuring special guest Abby Trott), covered the town of Earlsboro in episode 66 (June 2017). https://soundcloud.com/songsaladpodcast/ep-66-shinda-ushi-dead-cows
