= James Coody Johnson =

- Born: 1864
- Died: February 1927 (aged 62–63); Wewoka, Oklahoma
- Citizenship: Muscogee Nation; Seminole Nation of Oklahoma; American (circa. 1900)
- Occupation: lawyer

James Coody Johnson (1864 – February 1927) was an African-Creek entrepreneur, interpreter, lawyer and politician. He was a leading advocate for African-American rights and dual citizen of the Creek and Seminole nations.

== Early life ==
James Coody Johnson was born in 1864 at Fort Gibson to Robert Johnson, an African-Creek interpreter to the Seminole nation, and Elizabeth Davis Johnson. She was the daughter of Sarah Davis, a leading free African-Creek merchant who had purchased her freedom and that of her two daughters. Sarah Davis owned and operated a hotel in the Creek Agency village in present-day Arkansas. Johnson is listed as a Creek Freedman on the Dawes Rolls.

Johnson grew up speaking Seminole and English. He was educated at the Presbyterian Mission near Wewoka, Oklahoma. The Seminole nation sponsored his college education at Lincoln University, a historically black college (HBCU) in Pennsylvania. After graduation in 1884, Johnson returned to the Indian Territory and spent the next year and a half as a cowboy.

== Career ==
In 1866, the Creeks' treaty with the United States after the Civil War granted full citizenship to Creek slaves. African Creeks, as they were called, made achievements in education and politics.

After his father died in 1886, Johnson returned to the Creek country and became an interpreter to Federal Judge Isaac C. Parker. After studying law (reading law) under Judge Parker, Johnson was admitted to practice in the federal courts.

Johnson was one of the few Freedmen accorded dual citizenship in both the Creek and Seminole nations. He became an advisor to the Seminole Chief Halputta Micco and an official interpreter to the Seminole nation.

Before Oklahoma achieved statehood in 1907, Johnson was president of the Negro Protection League. Johnson was a leading advocate for African-American rights and opposed introduction of Jim Crow laws in Oklahoma. With statehood and the requirement to register for land allotments, African Creeks lost much of the freedom they had in earlier decades. The Dawes Commission, ruling that African descent barred people from being considered full members of the Creek Nation, divided its peoples after statehood.

He continued to work for the exercise of full citizenship rights by African Americans after the new legislature passed laws imposing segregation and other restrictions.

== Death and memorials ==
Johnson died at his home in Wewoka, Oklahoma, in February 1927.

The J. Coody Johnson Building in Wewoka, which he built in 1916 to hold his law offices, was listed on the National Register of Historic Places in 1985.
