= Butner, Oklahoma =

Populated place in Oklahoma, US

Coordinates: 35°15′39″N 96°27′32″W

Butner is a populated place in Seminole County, Oklahoma, at an elevation of 925 feet. It is about 6 miles south of Cromwell, Oklahoma, on Oklahoma State Highway 56. It had a post office from June 1, 1903, to November 30, 1906. It was named for one Thomas Butner, an early settler.

Butner Public Schools are actually located in Cromwell. The district was created in its present form in 1961 as a consolidation of the Excelsior, Cromwell and Butner public school districts.
