= Marjorie Rowland Clarke =

American artist and sculptor

- Born: Marjorie Jane Rowland; 1908; Baltimore, Maryland
- Died: 1997 (aged 88–89); Towson, Maryland
- Other names: Marjorie Jane Clarke, Mrs. Carl Clark
- Occupations: artist, sculptor
- Notable work: Historical Background of Wewoka

Marjorie Rowland Clarke (1908–1997) was an American artist and sculptor who won the federal commission to complete the post office mural for Wewoka, Oklahoma, as part of the Section of Painting and Sculpture′s projects, later called the Section of Fine Arts, of the Treasury Department. In addition to her mural, the University of Maryland medical buildings exhibit her sculptures.

== Early life ==
Marjorie Jane Rowland was born in 1908, in Baltimore, Maryland, to Mary Virginia (née Zollickoffer) and James M. H. Rowland. Her father was an obstetrician and the dean of the University of Maryland School of Medicine. Rowland attended Girls' Latin School in Baltimore, graduating in 1925. She went on to further her education at Goucher College. Completing her studies in 1929, Rowland then studied sculpture at the Maryland Institute College of Art. In 1933, she graduated earning a scholarship to study abroad from the Rinehart School of Sculpture. That same year, she married Carl Dame Clarke.

== Career ==
In 1936, Clarke created a bust of her father for the medical library at the University of Maryland. The sculpture was commissioned in celebration of Dr. Rowland's twentieth anniversary as the dean and fortieth anniversary as part of the university faculty. In 1941, she won a federal commission to complete a post office mural as part of the New Deal projects of the Works Progress Administration. The painting, Historical Background of Wewoka is still extant in the Wewoka, Oklahoma, post office. Clarke worked as a sculptor until 1975, but continued exhibiting until 1989, when she held her last showing Goucher College.

== Death and legacy ==
Clarke died January 16, 1997, at Towson, Maryland. Her works at the University of Maryland are on exhibit in the medical buildings. Her husband, dedicated two books to her: Molding and Casting for Moulage Workers, Sculptors, Artists, Physicians, Dentists, Criminologists, Craftsmen, Pattern Makers and Architectural Modelers (1946) and Metal Casting of Sculpture (1948). In the earlier volume, he confirmed that she was consulted to confirm that the information was technically correct and to discuss the problems involved with plaster casting. He also included photographs of her sculptures in the book.
