= Sinclair Loading Rack =

- U.S. National Register of Historic Places
- Location within Oklahoma Location within the United States
- Nearest city: Seminole, Oklahoma
- Coordinates: 35°12′57″N 96°38′20″W
- Area: less than one acre
- Built: 1928
- Built by: Sinclair Oil Co.
- NRHP reference No.: 85001698
- Added to NRHP: August 5, 1985

The Sinclair Loading Rack, near Seminole, Oklahoma, was built in 1928 by Sinclair Oil. It was listed on the National Register of Historic Places in 1985. It has apparently been demolished.

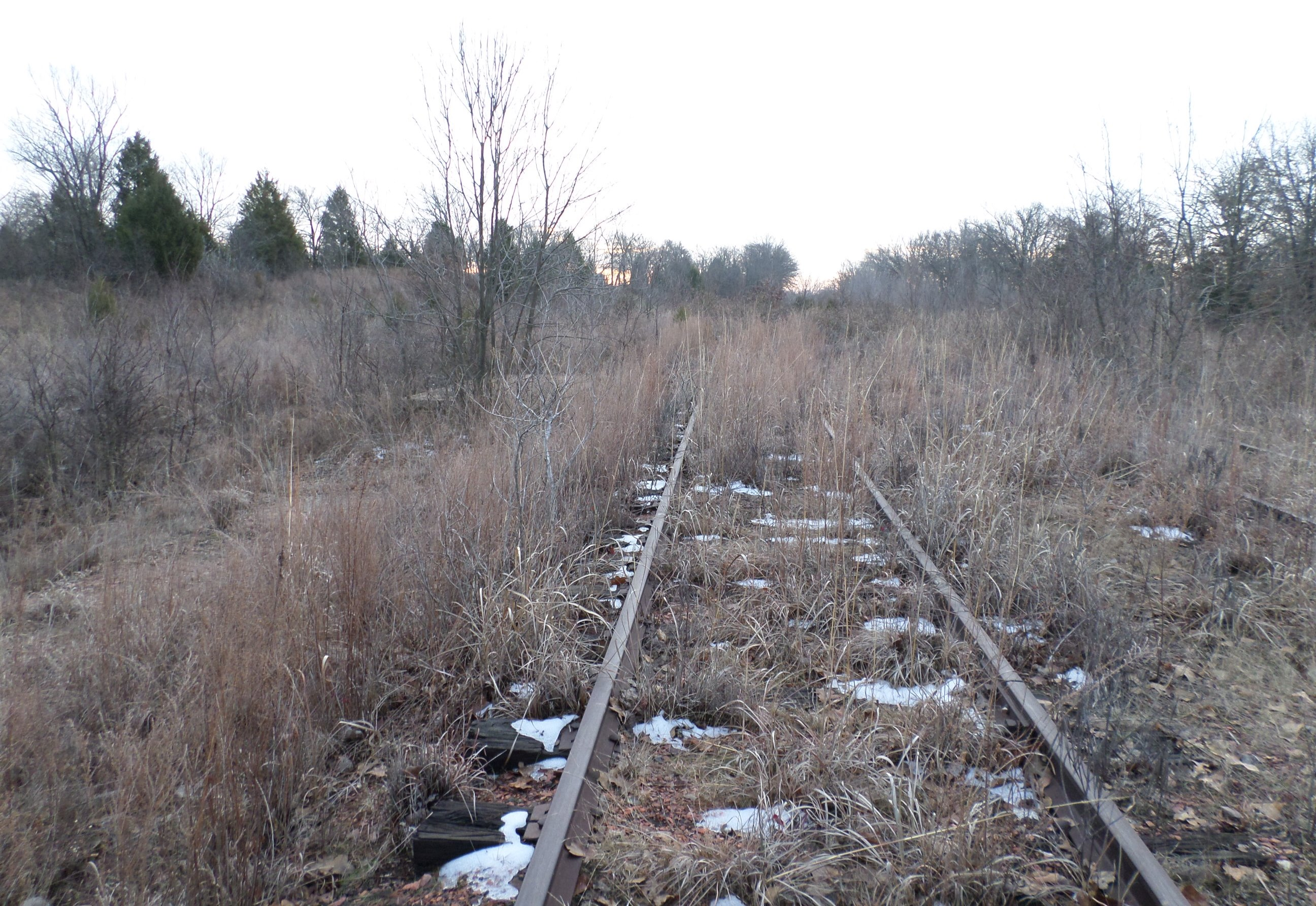
Photo in 2015 of tracks leading to former site
