= Wewoka Lake =

- Interactive map of Wewoka Lake
- Location: Wewoka, Oklahoma
- Coordinates: 35°11′32″N 96°31′17″W
- Type: Reservoir
- Surface area: 500 acres (200 ha)
- Shore length^{1}: 10 miles (16 km)
- ^{1} Shore length is not a well-defined measure.

Wewoka Lake, sometimes called Lake Wewoka, is a 500-surface-acre reservoir in Oklahoma, with 10 miles of shoreline. It is located just northwest of the City of Wewoka, Oklahoma, the Seminole County seat.

While developed by the City of Wewoka in the 1920’s as a water reservoir, opportunities at the lake today include fishing & boating; RV & primitive camping; and, swimming & water skiing.
