= Lima, Oklahoma =

- Town
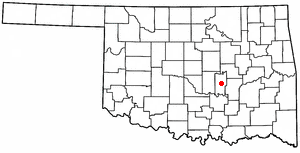
- Location of Lima, Oklahoma
- Coordinates: 35°10′25″N 96°35′53″W
- Country: United States
- State: Oklahoma
- County: Seminole

Area
  - Total: 0.47 sq mi (1.22 km^{2})
  - Land: 0.47 sq mi (1.22 km^{2})
  - Water: 0 sq mi (0.00 km^{2})
- Elevation: 889 ft (271 m)

Population (2020)
  - Total: 68
  - Density: 143.9/sq mi (55.57/km^{2})
- Time zone: UTC-6 (Central (CST))
  - Summer (DST): UTC-5 (CDT)
- FIPS code: 40-43000
- GNIS feature ID: 2412895

Lima is a town in Seminole County, Oklahoma, United States. It is one of the thirteen remaining historically All-Black towns in the state. The population was 68 at the time of the 2020 census, a 28.3% increase over 2010s figure of 53.

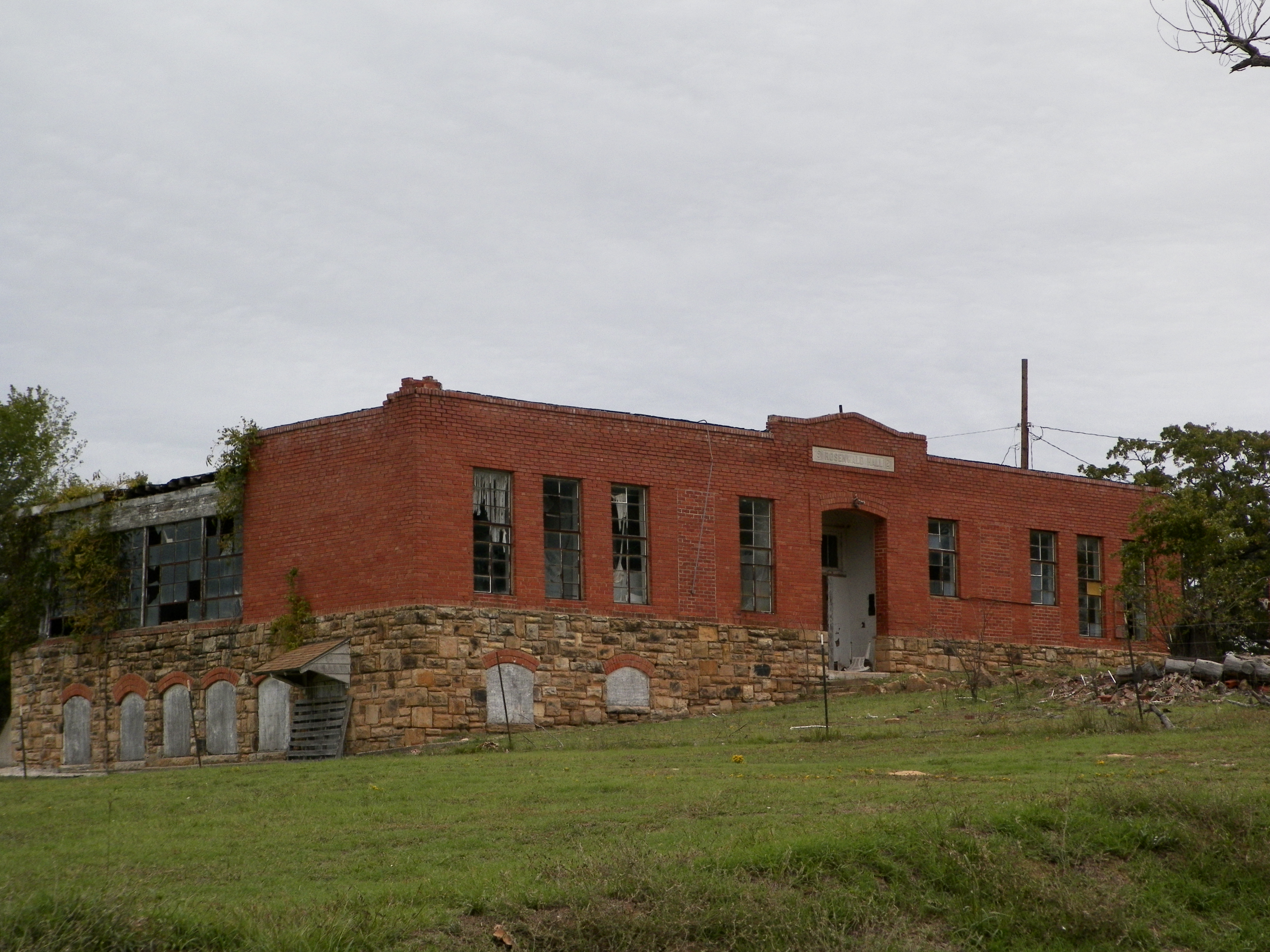
The Rosenwald Hall school in Lima, active from 1921 to 1966

== History ==
The historical African American community of Lima was named for the local limestone quarries, which existed by 1904. The town of Lima had a post office from 1907 until 1957. The first town postmaster was named Grudge V. Gross. Lima was incorporated in 1913, and it was established along an existing railroad line for the Chicago, Rock Island and Pacific Railroad. The Lima Observer newspaper was founded in 1914.

In 1921, the Rosenwald Fund helped to finance the founding of the Rosenwald Hall school in Lima; which remained in the community until its closure in 1966. In 1926, the Greater Seminole Oil Field was founded, and with its opening brought White residents to the town, who then created a separate eastern village named, "New Lima".

== Geography ==
According to the United States Census Bureau, the town has a total area of 0.5 square miles (1.3 km^{2}), all land.

== Demographics ==
Historical population
| Census | Pop. | Note | %± |
|---|---|---|---|
| 1920 | 146 | | — |
| 1930 | 239 | | 63.7% |
| 1970 | 238 | | — |
| 1980 | 256 | | 7.6% |
| 1990 | 133 | | −48.0% |
| 2000 | 74 | | −44.4% |
| 2010 | 53 | | −28.4% |
| 2020 | 68 | | 28.3% |
U.S. Decennial Census

=== 2020 census ===
As of the 2020 census, Lima had a population of 68. The median age was 47.0 years. 25.0% of residents were under the age of 18 and 22.1% of residents were 65 years of age or older. For every 100 females there were 83.8 males, and for every 100 females age 18 and over there were 82.1 males age 18 and over.

0.0% of residents lived in urban areas, while 100.0% lived in rural areas.

There were 26 households in Lima, of which 26.9% had children under the age of 18 living in them. Of all households, 50.0% were married-couple households, 11.5% were households with a male householder and no spouse or partner present, and 34.6% were households with a female householder and no spouse or partner present. About 11.5% of all households were made up of individuals and 3.8% had someone living alone who was 65 years of age or older.

There were 30 housing units, of which 13.3% were vacant. The homeowner vacancy rate was 0.0% and the rental vacancy rate was 33.3%.

Racial composition as of the 2020 census
| Race | Number | Percent |
|---|---|---|
| White | 12 | 17.6% |
| Black or African American | 31 | 45.6% |
| American Indian and Alaska Native | 10 | 14.7% |
| Asian | 0 | 0.0% |
| Native Hawaiian and Other Pacific Islander | 0 | 0.0% |
| Some other race | 1 | 1.5% |
| Two or more races | 14 | 20.6% |
| Hispanic or Latino (of any race) | 9 | 13.2% |

=== 2000 census ===
As of the census of 2000, there were 74 people, 30 households, and 18 families residing in the town. The population density was 159.9 inhabitants per square mile (61.7/km^{2}). There were 39 housing units at an average density of 84.3 per square mile (32.5/km^{2}). The racial makeup of the town was 43.24% White, 36.49% African American, 5.41% Native American, and 14.86% from two or more races. Hispanic or Latino of any race were 2.70% of the population.

There were 30 households, out of which 13.3% had children under the age of 18 living with them, 40.0% were married couples living together, 16.7% had a female householder with no husband present, and 36.7% were non-families. 33.3% of all households were made up of individuals, and 10.0% had someone living alone who was 65 years of age or older. The average household size was 2.47 and the average family size was 3.05.

In the town, the population was spread out, with 28.4% under the age of 18, 5.4% from 18 to 24, 18.9% from 25 to 44, 33.8% from 45 to 64, and 13.5% who were 65 years of age or older. The median age was 44 years. For every 100 females, there were 117.6 males. For every 100 females age 18 and over, there were 89.3 males.

The median income for a household in the town was $18,750, and the median income for a family was $15,625. Males had a median income of $23,125 versus $14,375 for females. The per capita income for the town was $6,473. There were 47.4% of families and 59.7% of the population living below the poverty line, including 70.4% of under eighteens and 40.0% of those over 64.

== Education ==
It is in the New Lima Public Schools school district.

== See also ==
- Boley, Brooksville, Clearview, Grayson, Langston, Redbird, Rentiesville, Summit, Taft, Tatums, Tullahassee, and Vernon, other "All-Black" settlements that were part of the Land Run of 1889.
- New Lima Public Schools
