= New Lima Public Schools =

School district in Oklahoma, United States

Coordinates: 35°10′19″N 96°35′31″W

New Lima Public Schools is a school district headquartered in Lima, Oklahoma, United States. The district contains an elementary school and a combined middle/high school. The district-wide mascot is the falcon. The population of the school is approximately 300. In 1957, with the end of segregation, the Lima and New Lima schools merged creating the current one-school district.

As of January 2, 2025 the superintendent for New Lima Public Schools is Rhonda Barkhimer. The high school principal Kent Lee. The elementary school principal is Stacy Glenn.

The district includes Lima and parts of Seminole.

== Athletics ==
New Lima High School has won four Oklahoma High School Boys Class B Championships in 1967, 1968, 1977, and 1978.

Center Eddie Louie was named the Oklahoma state Boys' Basketball Player of the Year for 1978. Jim Knapp, New Lima long time coach, won the state’s Boys' Basketball Coach of the Year in 1978; he also won the title in 1973. Louie also led the team to the state’s Tournament of Champions Champion earlier that season. The Oklahoman named the 1978 New Lima Boys Basketball team as the #24 "best in sports," noting, "1978 New Lima boys basketball: 31-0. Tiny Class B state champs also won Tournament of Champions, beating Tulsa Washington. Senior stars Eddie Louie and George Allen finished careers 113-10 with two state crowns." They also won the 1978 Class B Baseball State Championship over Eakly, 3-0.

The New Lima girls continued the school's winning basketball tradition: winning the 1984 and 1985 Girls Class B Championships.
