= Seminole County, Oklahoma =

County in Oklahoma, United States

- County
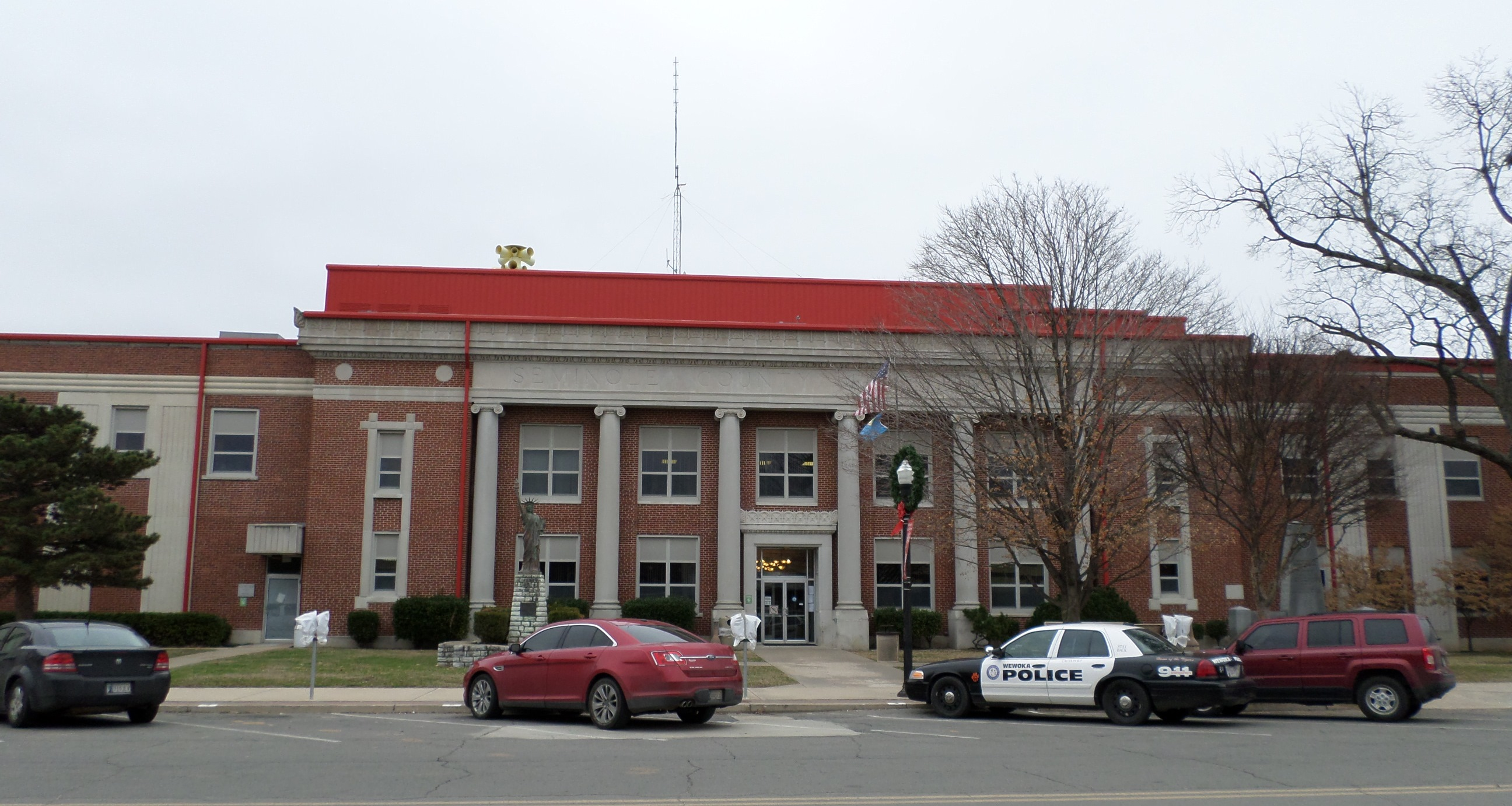
- Seminole County Courthouse in Wewoka

- Location within the U.S. state of Oklahoma
- Coordinates: 35°10′N 96°37′W
- Country: United States
- State: Oklahoma
- Founded: 1907
- Seat: Wewoka
- Largest city: Seminole

Area
  - Total: 640 sq mi (1,700 km^{2})
  - Land: 633 sq mi (1,640 km^{2})
  - Water: 7.6 sq mi (20 km^{2}) 1.2%

Population (2020)
  - Total: 23,556
  - Estimate (2025): 23,441 ▼
  - Density: 37.2/sq mi (14.4/km^{2})
- Congressional district: 5th
- Website: seminolecountyok.com

Seminole County is a county located in the U.S. state of Oklahoma. As of the 2020 census, the population was 23,556. Its county seat is Wewoka. Most of the county was a reservation for the Seminole Nation of Oklahoma which still retains jurisdiction over some land in the county. A small portion of land at the eastern end of the county belonged to the Muscogee (Creek) Nation.

Seminole County is notable for the Greater Seminole Field, one of the most important oil fields ever found, which is still producing. It extends into nearby counties. In the early years of the oil boom, workers and adventurers flooded into the county, rapidly tripling the population. As oil production later declined, jobs and residents left.

== History ==
Seminole County has been an important part of the Oklahoma and United States petroleum industry for over 80 years. The Greater Seminole Field was one of the most important oil fields ever found and is still producing. Discovered one field after another in 1926, it contained an estimated 822,000,000 barrels (130,700,000 m^{3}) of oil. To group the fields together, the oil companies decided to come up with a name, and this was suggested by Paul Hedrick, oil editor of the Tulsa World. Early oil discoveries in the area were the Wewoka oil field and Cromwell oil field, both discovered in 1923. Then, on July 16, 1926, the Fixico No. 1 well reached the Wilcox sand at 4073 feet, bringing in the Seminole City Field. Located within the Greater Seminole area are 6 of Oklahoma's 22 giant oil fields, including Earlsboro, St. Louis, Seminole, Bowlegs, Little River, and Allen. Total production from the Greater Seminole area from 1926 to 1936 was 702,157,800 barrels, or 18% of all production in Oklahoma.

The Maud field, discovered in 1927 by Amerada Petroleum, was the first discovery using reflection seismology. This marked the beginning of the use of modern geophysical methods in the petroleum industry.

The Seminole County Courthouse was built in 1927.

== Geography ==
According to the U.S. Census Bureau, the county has a total area of 640 square miles (1,700 km^{2}), of which 633 square miles (1,640 km^{2}) is land and 7.6 square miles (20 km^{2}) (1.2%) is water. The county is bounded on the north by the North Canadian River and on the south by the Canadian River.

=== Adjacent counties ===
- Okfuskee County (northeast)
- Hughes County (east)
- Pontotoc County (south)
- Pottawatomie County (west)

== Demographics ==
Historical population
| Census | Pop. | Note | %± |
|---|---|---|---|
| 1910 | 19,964 | | — |
| 1920 | 23,808 | | 19.3% |
| 1930 | 79,621 | | 234.4% |
| 1940 | 61,201 | | −23.1% |
| 1950 | 40,672 | | −33.5% |
| 1960 | 28,066 | | −31.0% |
| 1970 | 25,144 | | −10.4% |
| 1980 | 27,473 | | 9.3% |
| 1990 | 25,412 | | −7.5% |
| 2000 | 24,894 | | −2.0% |
| 2010 | 25,482 | | 2.4% |
| 2020 | 23,556 | | −7.6% |
| 2025 (est.) | 23,441 | ▼ | −0.5% |
U.S. Decennial Census; 1790-1960 1900-1990; 1990-2000 2010

Seminole County, Oklahoma – Racial composition
| Race (NH = Non-Hispanic) | 2020 | 2010 | 2000 | 1990 | 1980 |
|---|---|---|---|---|---|
| White alone (NH) | 59.9% (14,109) | 67.2% (17,133) | 69.9% (17,401) | 74.3% (18,885) | 78% (21,417) |
| Black alone (NH) | 3.9% (920) | 4.5% (1,152) | 5.5% (1,375) | 7.5% (1,913) | 7.7% (2,106) |
| American Indian alone (NH) | 18.7% (4,411) | 17.7% (4,500) | 17.1% (4,256) | 16.7% (4,236) | 13.4% (3,681) |
| Asian alone (NH) | 0.3% (72) | 0.3% (65) | 0.2% (53) | 0.1% (37) | 0.3% (73) |
| Pacific Islander alone (NH) | 0% (8) | 0.1% (16) | 0% (12) | 0.1% (37) | 0.3% (73) |
| Other race alone (NH) | 0.4% (89) | 0.1% (22) | 0% (9) | 0% (1) | 0% (13) |
| Multiracial (NH) | 11.8% (2,771) | 6.6% (1,691) | 5% (1,236) | — | — |
| Hispanic/Latino (any race) | 5% (1,176) | 3.5% (903) | 2.2% (552) | 1.3% (340) | 0.7% (183) |

=== 2020 census ===
As of the 2020 census, the county had a population of 23,556. Of the residents, 24.5% were under the age of 18 and 18.2% were 65 years of age or older; the median age was 39.9 years. For every 100 females there were 98.3 males, and for every 100 females age 18 and over there were 96.5 males.

The racial makeup of the county was 61.3% White, 3.9% Black or African American, 19.7% American Indian and Alaska Native, 0.3% Asian, 1.7% from some other race, and 13.1% from two or more races. Hispanic or Latino residents of any race comprised 5.0% of the population.

There were 8,978 households in the county, of which 31.8% had children under the age of 18 living with them and 28.2% had a female householder with no spouse or partner present. About 28.6% of all households were made up of individuals and 13.5% had someone living alone who was 65 years of age or older.

There were 10,712 housing units, of which 16.2% were vacant. Among occupied housing units, 68.7% were owner-occupied and 31.3% were renter-occupied. The homeowner vacancy rate was 2.9% and the rental vacancy rate was 15.8%.

The most reported ancestries in 2020 were:

- English (14.5%)
- Irish (8.6%)
- German (7%)
- The Seminole Nation of Oklahoma (6.8%)
- Seminole (6%)
- The Muscogee (Creek) Nation (4.2%)
- Mexican (4%)
- African American (3.7%)
- Cherokee (2.7%)
- The Chickasaw Nation (1.9%)

=== 2000 census ===
As of the 2000 census, there were 24,894 people, 9,575 households, and 6,788 families residing in the county. The population density was 15/km^{2} (39/mi^{2}). There were 11,146 housing units at an average density of 7/km^{2} (18/mi^{2}). The racial makeup of the county was 70.74% White, 5.59% Black or African American, 17.39% Native American, 0.22% Asian, 0.05% Pacific Islander, 0.74% from other races, and 5.28% from two or more races. 2.22% of the population were Hispanic or Latino of any race. 94.7% spoke English, 2.9% Muskogee and 1.7% Spanish as their first language.

There were 9,575 households, out of which 30.70% had children under the age of 18 living with them, 53.30% were married couples living together, 13.30% had a female householder with no husband present, and 29.10% were non-families. 25.90% of all households were made up of individuals, and 13.10% had someone living alone who was 65 years of age or older. The average household size was 2.54 and the average family size was 3.05.

In the county, the population was spread out, with 26.30% under the age of 18, 9.00% from 18 to 24, 24.40% from 25 to 44, 23.40% from 45 to 64, and 16.70% who were 65 years of age or older. The median age was 38 years. For every 100 females there were 93.20 males. For every 100 females age 18 and over, there were 90.00 males.

The median income for a household in the county was $25,568, and the median income for a family was $30,791. Males had a median income of $25,954 versus $18,285 for females. The per capita income for the county was $13,956. About 16.70% of families and 20.80% of the population were below the poverty line, including 28.90% of those under age 18 and 14.40% of those age 65 or over.

== Life expectancy and health ==
Of 3,142 counties in the United States in 2014, the Institute for Health Metrics and Evaluation ranked Seminole County 3,014 in the average life expectancy at birth of male residents and 3,108 in the life expectancy of female residents, the lowest life expectancy of Oklahoma counties, and among the lowest life expectancy for all counties. Males in Seminole County lived an average of 70.2 years and females lived an average of 75.4 years compared to the national average for life expectancy of 76.7 for males and 81.5 for females.

In the 1980-2014 period, the average life expectancy in Seminole County for females declined by 0.4 years while male longevity increased by 2.7 years compared to the national average for the same period of an increased life expectancy of 4.0 years for women and 6.7 years for men. Seminole County ranked in the worst performing 10 percent of all counties. High rates of smoking and obesity for both sexes and a low level of physical activity for males appear to be contributing factors to the relatively short life expectancy.

In 2020, the Robert Wood Johnson Foundation ranked Seminole country as 61st (of 77 counties in Oklahoma) in "health outcomes," as measured by length and quality of life.

== Politics ==
Voter Registration and Party Enrollment as of June 30, 2023
| Party | Number of Voters | Percentage |
|---|---|---|
| Democratic | 3,999 | 32.34% |
| Republican | 6,160 | 49.81% |
| Others | 2,208 | 17.85% |
| Total | 12,367 | 100% |

United States presidential election results for Seminole County, Oklahoma
| Year | Republican | | Democratic | | Third party(ies) | |
| Year | No. | % | No. | % | No. | % |
|---|---|---|---|---|---|---|
| 1908 | 1,168 | 45.47% | 945 | 36.78% | 456 | 17.75% |
| 1912 | 715 | 27.03% | 1,172 | 44.31% | 758 | 28.66% |
| 1916 | 872 | 26.82% | 1,444 | 44.42% | 935 | 28.76% |
| 1920 | 3,382 | 60.73% | 1,869 | 33.56% | 318 | 5.71% |
| 1924 | 2,326 | 40.05% | 3,007 | 51.77% | 475 | 8.18% |
| 1928 | 8,072 | 64.60% | 4,423 | 35.40% | 0 | 0.00% |
| 1932 | 3,348 | 21.60% | 12,154 | 78.40% | 0 | 0.00% |
| 1936 | 4,001 | 25.37% | 11,695 | 74.17% | 72 | 0.46% |
| 1940 | 6,880 | 38.05% | 11,167 | 61.75% | 36 | 0.20% |
| 1944 | 4,560 | 39.00% | 7,116 | 60.86% | 16 | 0.14% |
| 1948 | 3,423 | 29.65% | 8,122 | 70.35% | 0 | 0.00% |
| 1952 | 6,668 | 48.52% | 7,076 | 51.48% | 0 | 0.00% |
| 1956 | 5,230 | 47.00% | 5,897 | 53.00% | 0 | 0.00% |
| 1960 | 5,505 | 56.40% | 4,256 | 43.60% | 0 | 0.00% |
| 1964 | 3,676 | 35.84% | 6,582 | 64.16% | 0 | 0.00% |
| 1968 | 3,711 | 38.09% | 3,889 | 39.92% | 2,142 | 21.99% |
| 1972 | 6,879 | 70.02% | 2,746 | 27.95% | 199 | 2.03% |
| 1976 | 4,237 | 41.53% | 5,874 | 57.58% | 91 | 0.89% |
| 1980 | 5,067 | 49.95% | 4,726 | 46.58% | 352 | 3.47% |
| 1984 | 6,009 | 59.91% | 3,957 | 39.45% | 64 | 0.64% |
| 1988 | 4,078 | 44.95% | 4,911 | 54.13% | 84 | 0.93% |
| 1992 | 3,253 | 31.77% | 4,624 | 45.16% | 2,363 | 23.08% |
| 1996 | 2,935 | 35.67% | 4,225 | 51.34% | 1,069 | 12.99% |
| 2000 | 4,011 | 50.99% | 3,783 | 48.09% | 72 | 0.92% |
| 2004 | 5,624 | 60.66% | 3,648 | 39.34% | 0 | 0.00% |
| 2008 | 5,600 | 65.29% | 2,977 | 34.71% | 0 | 0.00% |
| 2012 | 4,856 | 65.13% | 2,600 | 34.87% | 0 | 0.00% |
| 2016 | 5,613 | 69.84% | 2,071 | 25.77% | 353 | 4.39% |
| 2020 | 6,011 | 72.10% | 2,150 | 25.79% | 176 | 2.11% |
| 2024 | 5,951 | 73.98% | 1,951 | 24.25% | 142 | 1.77% |

== Communities ==
=== Cities ===
- Konawa
- Maud (also in Pottawatomie County)
- Seminole
- Wewoka (county seat)

=== Towns ===
- Bowlegs
- Cromwell
- Lima
- Sasakwa

=== Unincorporated communities ===
- Butner
- Dixon (also a census-designated place)
- Little
- Nobletown
- Schoolton (part of the town of Cromwell)
- Vamoosa
- Wolf

=== Ghost town ===
- Dewright

== Education ==
Unified school districts include:

- Bowlegs Public Schools
- Butner Public Schools
- Konawa Public Schools
- Maud Public Schools
- New Lima Public Schools
- Sasakwa Public Schools
- Seminole Public Schools
- Strother Public Schools
- Varnum Public Schools
- Wewoka Public Schools

There is one elementary school district: Justice Public School.

== Transportation ==
=== Major highways ===
- I-40
- US 270
- US 377 / SH-99
  - SH-99A
- SH-9
  - SH-9A
- SH-3E
- SH-39
- SH-56
- SH-59

== See also ==
- National Register of Historic Places listings in Seminole County, Oklahoma
- Seminole County, Georgia
- Seminole County, Florida
