= Konawa, Oklahoma =

Konawa, Oklahoma Konawv (Creek)
- City
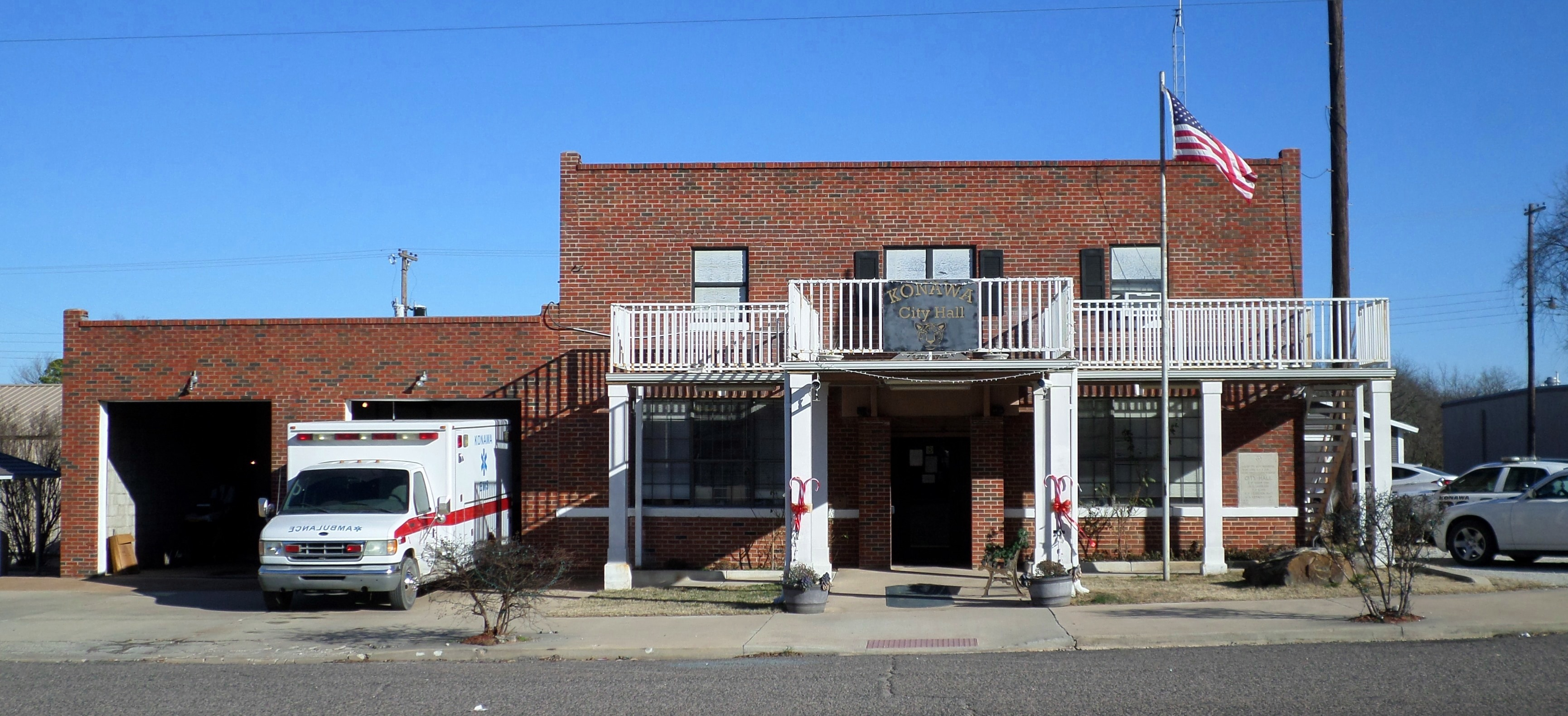
- Konawa City Hall

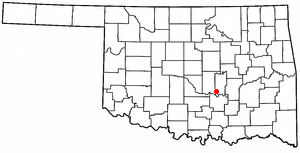
- Location of Konawa, Oklahoma
- Coordinates: 34°57′28″N 96°45′10″W
- Country: United States
- State: Oklahoma
- County: Seminole

Area
  - Total: 1.31 sq mi (3.40 km^{2})
  - Land: 1.31 sq mi (3.40 km^{2})
  - Water: 0 sq mi (0.00 km^{2})
- Elevation: 981 ft (299 m)

Population (2020)
  - Total: 1,288
  - Density: 980.7/sq mi (378.66/km^{2})
- Time zone: UTC-6 (Central (CST))
  - Summer (DST): UTC-5 (CDT)
- ZIP code: 74849
- Area code: 580
- FIPS code: 40-40200
- GNIS feature ID: 2411555

Konawa (Creek: Konawv) is a city in Seminole County, Oklahoma, United States. The population was 1,288 at the time of the 2020 census. Konawa is a Seminole word meaning, "string of beads."

== History ==
Located in southwestern Seminole County, Konawa, a Seminole word meaning "string of beads," lies at the intersection of State Highways 9A and 39. On January 7, 1904, Tom West, a mixed-blood Seminole, sold George Northrup a plot of land that became the Konawa townsite. The post office was established on July 15, 1904, with Robert C. Lovelace as postmaster. Early-day establishments included the first newspaper, the Konawa Chief, hardware and drug stores, lumberyards, a blacksmith, and a bank. In 1903, the Missouri, Kansas and Oklahoma Railroad (later the Missouri, Kansas and Texas Railway) bypassed the nearby town of Violet Springs. Most families and businesses moved to other towns. Some moved their houses to Konawa, and many of these buildings continued to stand at the turn of the twenty-first century.

Konawa served as a trade center for a surrounding agricultural region. At 1907 statehood, population stood at 620. The Konawa Leader has informed the citizens since 1917. During the 1920s streets were paved, several oil wells were drilled, and a new high school was built. In November 1931, Konawa attracted the attention of Pretty Boy Floyd, who robbed the First National Bank. During World War II, the Konawa National Guard Armory (National Register of Historical Places, NR 94000483), a WPA project, housed German prisoners of war. On February 17, 1961, a tornado destroyed downtown Konawa and injured five individuals.

The Sacred Heart Mission, which was the forerunner of St. Gregory's University moved in 1876 from its original location in Atoka to a location near Konawa and became an abbey and later a school. After a disastrous fire in 1901 that destroyed the school and the monastery, the monks accepted an offer from the town of Shawnee and began construction of the Catholic University of Oklahoma and St. Gregory's Abbey in 1910. In 1927, the abbey completely relocated from Konawa to Shawnee.

The energy industry remained a mainstay of the local economy, with oil-field service companies still important. In May 1968, Oklahoma Gas and Electric Corporation broke ground for the Seminole Power Plant, creating the 1,350-acre Konawa Reservoir at a cost of $45 million. By 1975, the third power unit with an output of more than 1.6 million kilowatts was built. Konawa Reservoir is one of Oklahoma's top trophy lakes.

In August 1963, Konawa hosted its first All-Night Gospel Singing. During its heyday, an estimated twenty-five thousand people attended the annual event. The town maintains a council-city manager type of government. At the turn of the twenty-first century, Konawa had 1,479 residents.

== Geography ==
According to the United States Census Bureau, the city has a total area of 1.4 square miles (3.6 km^{2}), all land.

The town is on Oklahoma State Highway 39, and is the endpoint for one section of State Highway 9A. Lake Konawa is directly to the east.

=== Climate ===
Climate is characterized by relatively high temperatures and evenly distributed precipitation throughout the year. Temperatures are high and can lead to warm, oppressive nights. Summers are usually somewhat wetter than winters, with much of the rainfall coming from convectional thunderstorm activity. The Köppen Climate Classification subtype for this climate is "Cfa" (Humid Subtropical Climate).

== Demographics ==
Historical population
Census	Pop.	Note	%±
1910	701		—
1920	896		27.8%
1930	2,070		131.0%
1940	2,205		6.5%
1950	2,707		22.8%
1960	1,555		−42.6%
1970	1,719		10.5%
1980	1,711		−0.5%
1990	1,508		−11.9%
2000	1,479		−1.9%
2010	1,298		−12.2%
2020	1,288		−0.8%
U.S. Decennial Census

=== 2020 census ===
As of the 2020 census, Konawa had a population of 1,288. The median age was 36.8 years. 25.8% of residents were under the age of 18 and 15.1% of residents were 65 years of age or older. For every 100 females there were 96.6 males, and for every 100 females age 18 and over there were 90.4 males age 18 and over.

0% of residents lived in urban areas, while 100.0% lived in rural areas.

There were 483 households in Konawa, of which 37.3% had children under the age of 18 living in them. Of all households, 37.5% were married-couple households, 19.5% were households with a male householder and no spouse or partner present, and 35.4% were households with a female householder and no spouse or partner present. About 32.3% of all households were made up of individuals and 13.4% had someone living alone who was 65 years of age or older.

There were 596 housing units, of which 19.0% were vacant. Among occupied housing units, 52.0% were owner-occupied and 48.0% were renter-occupied. The homeowner vacancy rate was 5.8% and the rental vacancy rate was 17.1%.

Racial composition as of the 2020 census
Race	Percent
White	56.6%
Black or African American	1.6%
American Indian and Alaska Native	25.4%
Asian	0.1%
Native Hawaiian and Other Pacific Islander	0%
Some other race	2.2%
Two or more races	14.1%
Hispanic or Latino (of any race)	5.2%

=== 2010 census ===
As of the 2010 United States census, there were 1,298 people living in the city. The racial composition of the city is 64.5% White, 21.5% Native American, 9.6% from two or more races, 2.4% Black, 0.4% Pacific Islander and 0.2% Asian. 1.5% were Hispanic or Latino of any race.

=== 2000 census ===
As of the 2000 census, there were 1,479 people, 551 households, and 360 families living in the city. The population density was 1,083.9 inhabitants per square mile (418.5/km^{2}). There were 657 housing units at an average density of 481.5 per square mile (185.9/km^{2}). The racial makeup of the city was 70.11% White, 1.89% African American, 22.92% Native American, 0.20% Asian, 0.81% from other races, and 4.06% from two or more races. Hispanic or Latino of any race were 2.16% of the population.

There were 551 households, out of which 35.4% had children under the age of 18 living with them, 45.0% were married couples living together, 16.9% had a female householder with no husband present, and 34.5% were non-families. 31.0% of all households were made up of individuals, and 16.9% had someone living alone who was 65 years of age or older. The average household size was 2.53 and the average family size was 3.19.

In the city, the population was spread out, with 28.9% under the age of 18, 9.0% from 18 to 24, 25.2% from 25 to 44, 19.9% from 45 to 64, and 17.0% who were 65 years of age or older. The median age was 36 years. For every 100 females, there were 91.1 males. For every 100 females age 18 and over, there were 86.5 males.

The median income for a household in the city was $17,300, and the median income for a family was $23,375. Males had a median income of $21,771 versus $15,208 for females. The per capita income for the city was $10,474. About 31.2% of families and 31.5% of the population were below the poverty line, including 42.4% of those under age 18 and 24.1% of those age 65 or over.

== Education ==
The town is in the Konawa Public Schools school district.
