= Seminole County Courthouse (Oklahoma) =

- U.S. National Register of Historic Places
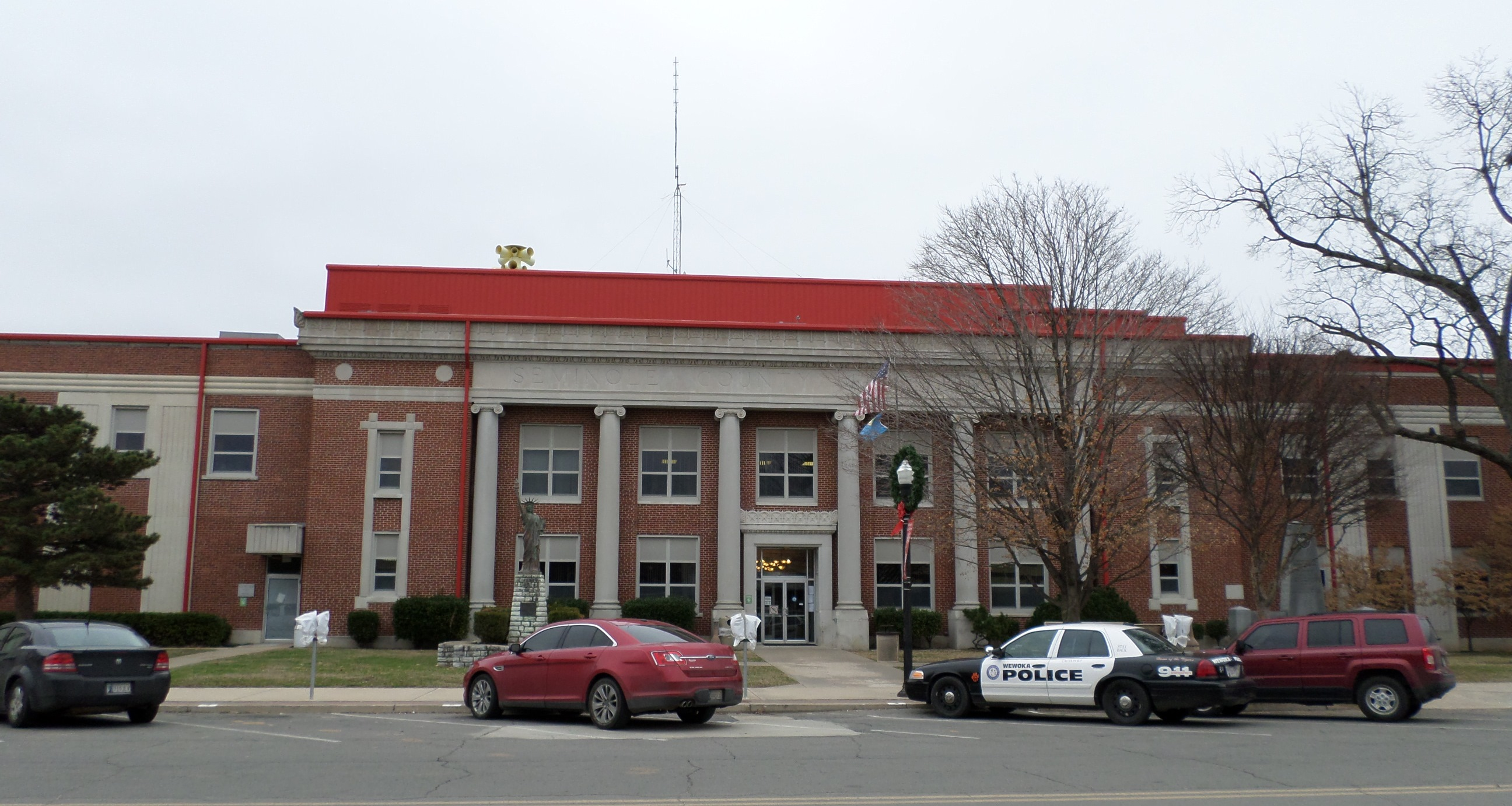
- The courthouse in December 2014

- Location within Oklahoma Location within the United States
- Interactive map showing the location of Seminole County Courthouse
- Location: 120 S. Wewoka St., Wewoka, Oklahoma
- Coordinates: 35°9′29″N 96°29′27″W
- Built: 1927, 1939
- Architect: Maurice Baldwin; Mannot & Reid
- MPS: County Courthouses of Oklahoma TR
- NRHP reference No.: 84003429
- Added to NRHP: August 24, 1984

The Seminole County Courthouse is a two-story red brick courthouse building whose original, central portion was built in 1927. It was expanded in 1939 in a Works Progress Administration project, and other renovation was done in the 1970s, compatibly with the original design. It was listed on the National Register of Historic Places in 1984.
