= Seminole, Oklahoma =

Seminole, Oklahoma Semvnole (Creek)
- City
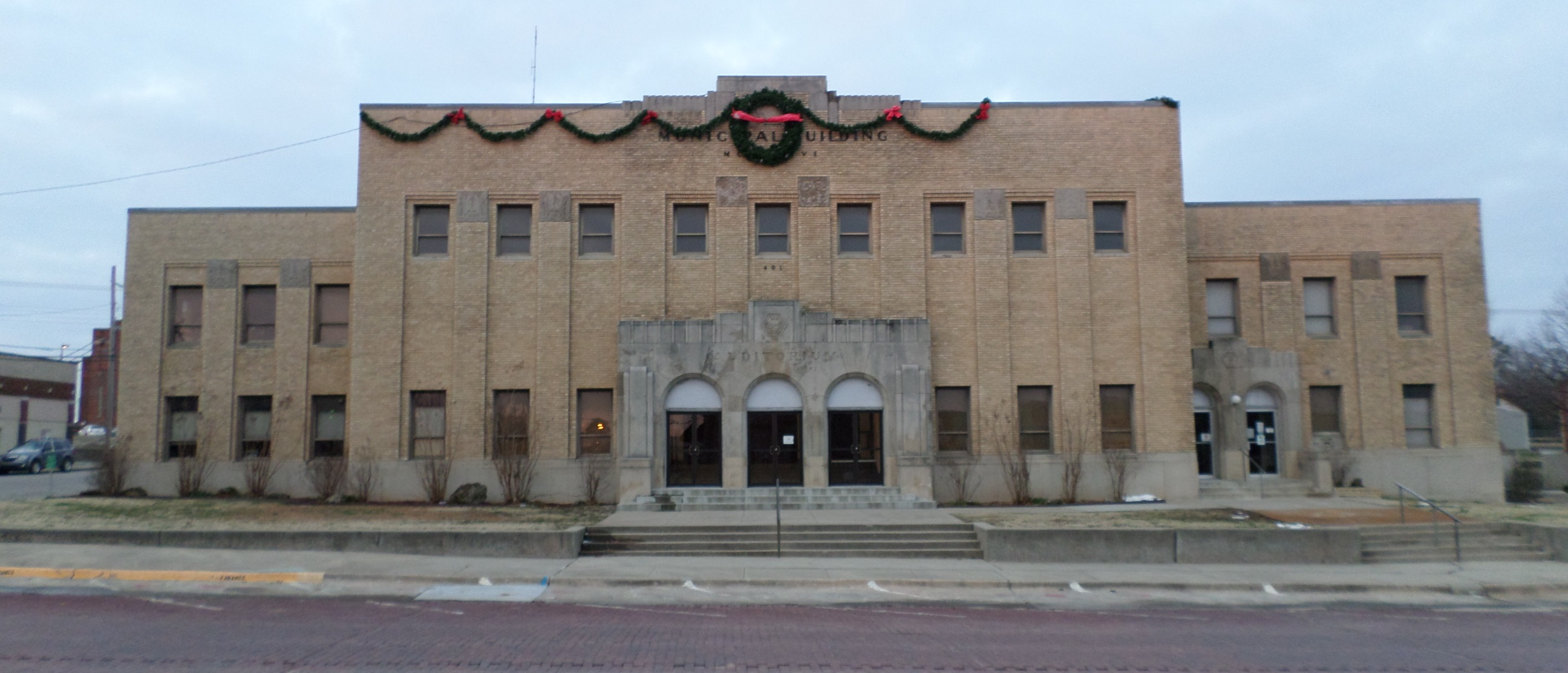
- The Seminole Municipal Building, which is on the National Register of Historic Places

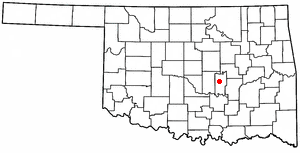
- Location of Seminole, Oklahoma
- Coordinates: 35°14′06″N 96°38′58″W
- Country: United States
- State: Oklahoma
- County: Seminole

Area
  - Total: 14.25 sq mi (36.91 km^{2})
  - Land: 13.70 sq mi (35.48 km^{2})
  - Water: 0.55 sq mi (1.43 km^{2})
- Elevation: 938 ft (286 m)

Population (2020)
  - Total: 7,146
  - Density: 522/sq mi (201.4/km^{2})
- Time zone: UTC-6 (Central (CST))
  - Summer (DST): UTC-5 (CDT)
- ZIP codes: 74818, 74868
- Area code: 405
- FIPS code: 40-66350
- GNIS feature ID: 2411865
- Website: www.seminole-oklahoma.net

Seminole (Creek: Semvnole, Meskwaki: Sheminônîheki) is a city in Seminole County, Oklahoma, United States. As of the 2020 census, Seminole had a population of 7,146. Seminole experienced a large population growth in the 1920s due to an oil boom.

== History ==
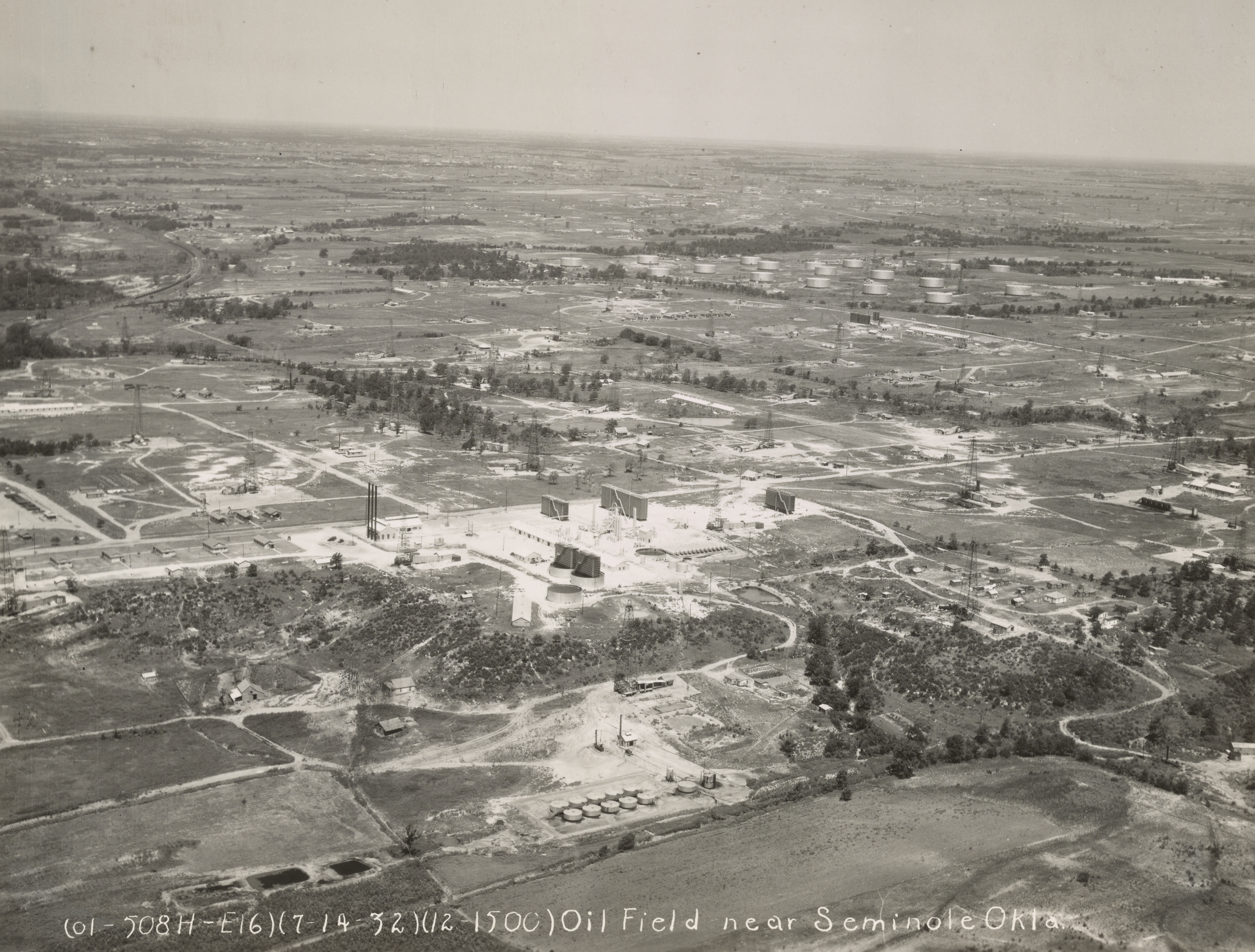
Oil wells in Seminole, 1932

The city was platted in 1906 as a relocation setting for the residents of Tidmore, when the railroad line was placed north of the town. When Oklahoma Territory and Indian Territory merged to become the U.S. state of Oklahoma in 1907, there were 206 residents.

Seminole competed to be the county seat of Seminole County, but lost to Wewoka. The town of Seminole was incorporated as a city in December 1924.

Upon the discovery of a high-producing oil well in the city in 1926, Seminole transformed from a town of 854 to a boom town of 25,000 to 30,000 residents. In August 1970 Seminole hosted its first All-Night Gospel Singing. During its heyday an estimated twenty-five thousand people attended the annual event. After the boom, the population declined to about 11,000 and remained that way until 1970.

There are multiple structures in the Seminole area listed on the National Register of Historic Places. They include the Home Stake Oil and Gas Company Building, Mekasukey Academy, the Seminole Municipal Building, the Sinclair Loading Rack, Strother Memorial Chapel, and the W.E. Grisso Mansion.

The city was heavily damaged by an EF2 tornado on May 4, 2022.

== Geography ==
According to the United States Census Bureau, the city has a total area of 14.5 square miles (38 km^{2}), of which 13.9 square miles (36 km^{2}) is land and 0.6 square miles (1.6 km^{2}) (3.93%) is water.

=== Climate ===
Climate data for Seminole, Oklahoma (1991–2020)
Month	Jan	Feb	Mar	Apr	May	Jun	Jul	Aug	Sep	Oct	Nov	Dec	Year
Mean daily maximum °F (°C)	51.8 (11.0)	56.5 (13.6)	65.0 (18.3)	73.6 (23.1)	81.0 (27.2)	89.0 (31.7)	94.8 (34.9)	94.7 (34.8)	86.7 (30.4)	76.1 (24.5)	63.5 (17.5)	53.6 (12.0)	73.9 (23.3)
Daily mean °F (°C)	39.0 (3.9)	43.3 (6.3)	51.6 (10.9)	60.2 (15.7)	69.3 (20.7)	77.7 (25.4)	82.8 (28.2)	82.0 (27.8)	73.9 (23.3)	62.5 (16.9)	50.6 (10.3)	41.5 (5.3)	61.2 (16.2)
Mean daily minimum °F (°C)	26.2 (−3.2)	30.1 (−1.1)	38.1 (3.4)	46.8 (8.2)	57.6 (14.2)	66.4 (19.1)	70.8 (21.6)	69.3 (20.7)	61.1 (16.2)	48.9 (9.4)	37.6 (3.1)	29.4 (−1.4)	48.5 (9.2)
Average precipitation inches (mm)	1.91 (49)	2.40 (61)	2.89 (73)	4.50 (114)	5.39 (137)	4.84 (123)	3.74 (95)	3.59 (91)	4.81 (122)	4.09 (104)	2.66 (68)	2.37 (60)	43.19 (1,097)
Average snowfall inches (cm)	1.9 (4.8)	0.2 (0.51)	0.6 (1.5)	0.0 (0.0)	0.0 (0.0)	0.0 (0.0)	0.0 (0.0)	0.0 (0.0)	0.0 (0.0)	0.0 (0.0)	0.1 (0.25)	1.6 (4.1)	4.4 (11.16)
Source: NOAA

== Demographics ==
Historical population
Census	Pop.	Note	%±
1910	476		—
1920	854		79.4%
1930	11,459		1,241.8%
1940	11,547		0.8%
1950	11,863		2.7%
1960	11,464		−3.4%
1970	7,878		−31.3%
1980	8,590		9.0%
1990	7,071		−17.7%
2000	6,899		−2.4%
2010	7,488		8.5%
2020	7,146		−4.6%
U.S. Decennial Census

=== 2020 census ===
As of the 2020 census, Seminole had a population of 7,146. The median age was 34.7 years. 25.5% of residents were under the age of 18 and 14.9% of residents were 65 years of age or older. For every 100 females there were 95.7 males, and for every 100 females age 18 and over there were 92.0 males age 18 and over.

87.9% of residents lived in urban areas, while 12.1% lived in rural areas.

There were 2,703 households in Seminole, of which 34.6% had children under the age of 18 living in them. Of all households, 36.2% were married-couple households, 20.1% were households with a male householder and no spouse or partner present, and 35.2% were households with a female householder and no spouse or partner present. About 32.3% of all households were made up of individuals and 14.0% had someone living alone who was 65 years of age or older.

There were 3,189 housing units, of which 15.2% were vacant. Among occupied housing units, 53.7% were owner-occupied and 46.3% were renter-occupied. The homeowner vacancy rate was 2.9% and the rental vacancy rate was 16.7%.

Racial composition as of the 2020 census
Race	Percent
White	59.0%
Black or African American	3.3%
American Indian and Alaska Native	19.9%
Asian	0.5%
Native Hawaiian and Other Pacific Islander	<0.1%
Some other race	2.5%
Two or more races	14.8%
Hispanic or Latino (of any race)	6.4%

=== 2000 census ===
As of the 2000 census, there were 6,899 people, 2,760 households, and 1,827 families residing in the city. The population density was 494.7 inhabitants per square mile (191.0/km^{2}). There were 3,172 housing units at an average density of 227.4 per square mile (87.8/km^{2}). The racial makeup of the city was 73.42% White, 3.97% African American, 16.38% Native American, 0.32% Asian, 0.04% Pacific Islander, 0.72% from other races, and 5.15% from two or more races. Hispanic or Latino of any race were 2.61% of the population.

There were 2,760 households, out of which 30.7% had children under the age of 18 living with them, 46.6% were married couples living together, 15.3% had a female householder with no husband present, and 33.8% were non-families. 29.3% of all households were made up of individuals, and 15.9% had someone living alone who was 65 years of age or older. The average household size was 2.45 and the average family size was 3.02.

In the city, the population was spread out, with 26.5% under the age of 18, 10.5% from 18 to 24, 24.3% from 25 to 44, 19.7% from 45 to 64, and 19.1% who were 65 years of age or older. The median age was 36 years. For every 100 females, there were 87.8 males. For every 100 females age 18 and over, there were 81.7 males.

The median income for a household in the city was $25,120, and the median income for a family was $29,091. Males had a median income of $26,765 versus $17,474 for females. The per capita income for the city was $12,946. About 16.3% of families and 19.9% of the population were below the poverty line, including 28.2% of those under age 18 and 8.9% of those age 65 or over.

== Education ==
The majority of the city is within the Seminole Public Schools school district. Seminole High School is that district's comprehensive high school.

Parts of Seminole are within these districts: Varnum Public Schools, Butner Public Schools, and New Lima Public Schools.

Seminole State College is located in the city.

== Transportation ==
Seminole is served by US Route 270, US Route 377, Oklahoma State Highway 3E, and Oklahoma State Highway 9.

Seminole Municipal Airport (KSRE, or FAA ID: SRE), owned by the city and located about 3 miles to the north, features two runways, the longer of which is paved and 5004’ by 75’.

Commercial air transportation is available out of Will Rogers World Airport, about 63 miles west-northwest.

== Recreation ==
Sportsman Lake is to the east-southeast of the city. Along with the associated 1400-acre wildlife refuge which surrounds it, the lake offers boat docks and ramps; primitive campsites as well as RV sites; equestrian trails and facilities; and, other amenities.

Wewoka Lake is further to the east-southeast. While developed by the City of Wewoka in the 1920’s as a water reservoir, opportunities at the lake today include fishing & boating; RV & primitive camping; and, swimming & water skiing.

== Notable people ==
- David Boren (1941–2025), former Oklahoma Governor, State Senator, and former President of the University of Oklahoma
- Ronald Chase (1934-2025), arts educator, painter, actor, photographer, filmmaker, opera designer
- Aaron Gwyn (born 1972), novelist and short story writer
- Enoch Kelly Haney (1940–2022), Principal Chief of the Seminole Nation, artist, and former Oklahoma State Senator
- Edmond Harjo (1917–2014), Seminole Code Talker during World War II and recipient of the Congressional Gold Medal
- Arthur Jones (1926–2007), founder of Nautilus, Inc.
- Joe Liggins (1916–1987), musician, early pioneer of rock and roll, The Honeydripper.
- Jesse Pearson (1930–1979), actor and screenwriter, born in Seminole in 1930
- Troy N. Smith (1922–2009), founder of Sonic Drive-In
- William C. Wantland (born 1934), Bishop of the Episcopal Diocese of Eau Claire
- Jesse Mashburn (born 1933), Olympic medalist in athletics
