= Wewoka, Oklahoma =

Wewoka, Oklahoma Ue-Wohkv (Creek)
- City
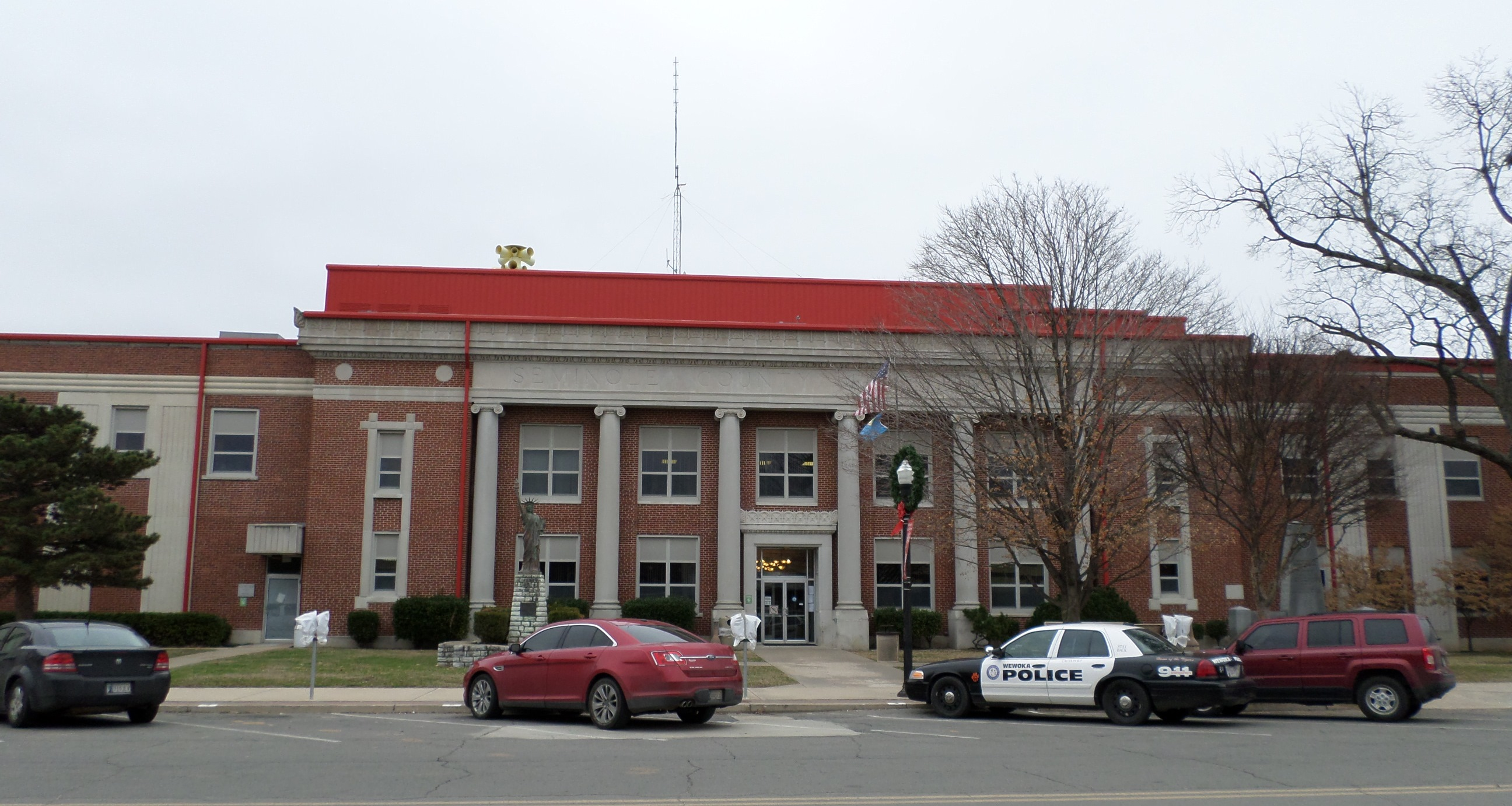
- Seminole County Courthouse

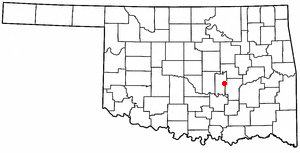
- Location of Wewoka, Oklahoma
- Coordinates: 35°08′38″N 96°29′48″W
- Country: United States
- State: Oklahoma
- County: Seminole

Government
  - Type: Council-manager

Area
  - Total: 4.84 sq mi (12.54 km^{2})
  - Land: 4.84 sq mi (12.54 km^{2})
  - Water: 0 sq mi (0.00 km^{2})
- Elevation: 873 ft (266 m)

Population (2020)
  - Total: 3,133
  - Density: 647.3/sq mi (249.91/km^{2})
- Time zone: UTC-6 (Central (CST))
  - Summer (DST): UTC-5 (CDT)
- ZIP code: 74884
- Area codes: 405 and 572
- FIPS code: 40-80550
- GNIS feature ID: 2412246
- Website: City website

Wewoka (Creek: Ue-Wohkv) is a city in Seminole County, Oklahoma, United States. The population was 3,271 at the 2020 census. It is the county seat of Seminole County. Founded by John Coheia, a Black Seminole, and Black Seminoles in January 1849, Wewoka is the capital of the Seminole Nation of Oklahoma.

== History ==
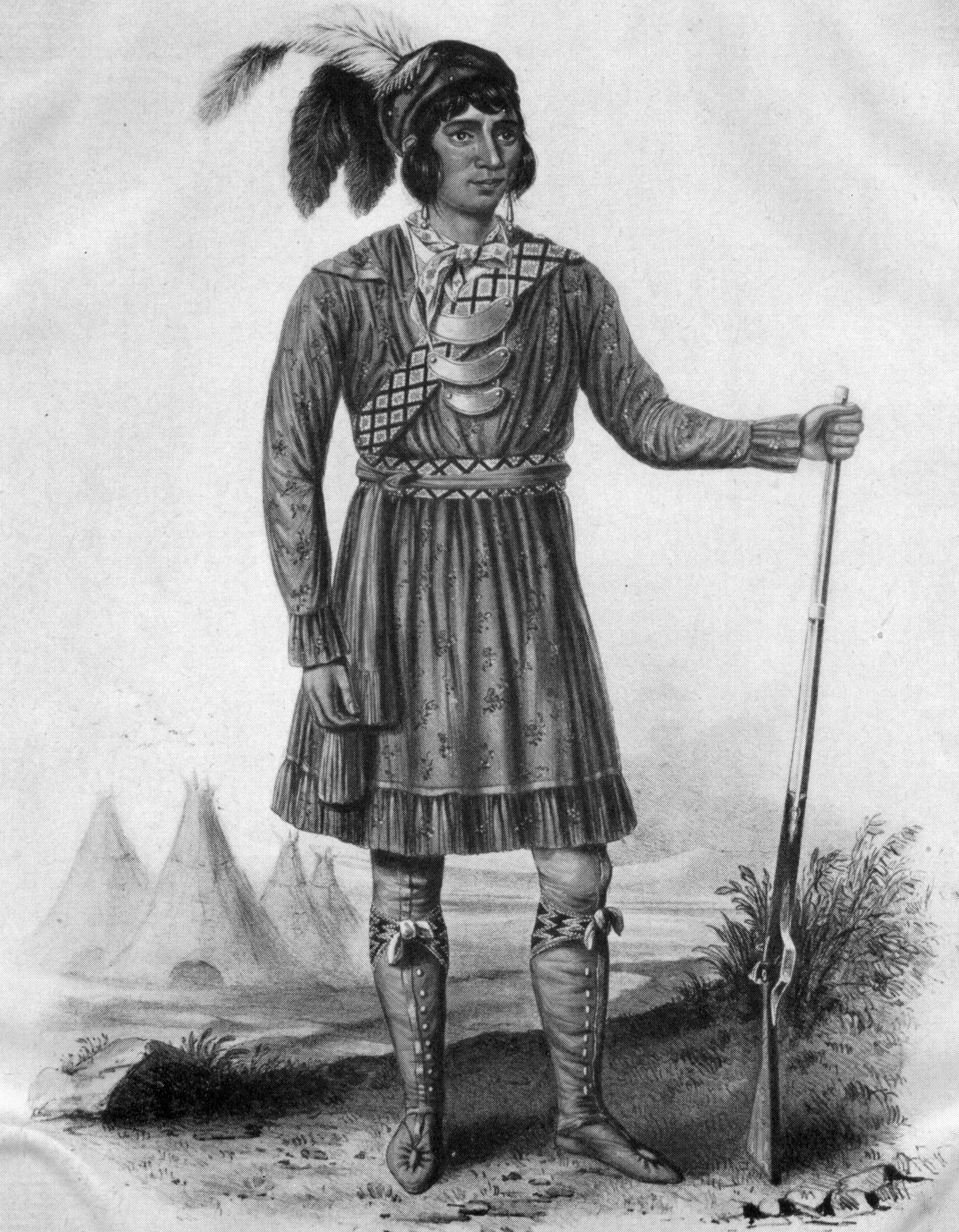
The city may have been named for the wife of Osceola. (1838 lithograph)

Wewoka's history begins with Black Seminole John Horse, who was also known as Gopher John. In the spring of 1849, Horse and a group of Black Seminoles founded a settlement near modern-day Wewoka. Seeking safety and autonomy from the Creek Nation, they established a community located at the falls of a small stream, lying in the fertile lands between the North and South Canadian Rivers. The steady rush of water over the falls gave rise to the name We-Wo-Ka – meaning "Barking Water" in the Mvskoke (Seminole) language. Other historians say he named the settlement Wewokea after Osceola's second wife who was of both Seminole and African ancestry.

In autumn of 1849, Horse and Seminole chief Wild Cat led Seminole families into Mexico to avoid the attempts of slavers to raid families and capture people of African descent. The Mexican government offered Wild Cat, Horse and other Seminoles land in Mexico if they could rid the land of renegades who were terrorizing Mexican citizens. Wild Cat was the next hereditary chief of the Seminole Nation but the government appointed its first chief John Jumper instead. The descendants of Wildcat and his band were split for a time between Wewoka, Texas, and Mexico until 1918.

The city was founded in 1866 when Elijah J. Brown, an employee of the federal government led Seminole refugees from Leroy, Kansas to Indian Territory. During the American Civil War, the Seminole Nation had sided with the Confederacy, although many tribe members fled to the relative safety of Kansas, where they remained for the duration of the war. In 1866, after the Confederacy surrendered, the United States government required the Seminole Nation to sign a new treaty, which required them to emancipate their slaves, give freedmen who wanted to stay in the territory full rights as citizens, including voting in the tribe. Brown led the refugees back to Wewoka, here he built himself a house and established a trading post. Freedmen settled in Wewoka along with the Seminole and Elijah Brown was the only legal white settler in the town. The trading post had several subsequent proprietors before it was bought by two Seminole brothers, John Frippo Brown and A. J. Brown, and became the Wewoka Trading Company in 1891. (Note: A third partner, C. L. Long, who became secretary of the Trading Company, joined the enterprise.) Rev. James Ross Ramsey, a Presbyterian missionary, founded the Ramsey Mission (considered the first school in present Seminole County) in 1866. A post office was established on May 13, 1867, with E. J. Brown as first postmaster. The Seminole Nation made Wewoka their capital city and Seminole Governor John Brown had a log house erected at Wewoka as the Seminole capitol in 1877. (Note: After the Seminole national government ceased to exist when Oklahoma was granted statehood on November 16, 1907, the former capital building became the county courthouse of the newly created Seminole County, Oklahoma.) (Note: County offices remained in the old capitol until a new county court house was completed in 1929.)

During the existence of the Seminole Nation as a political entity, the federal government was required by treaty to make payments directly to qualified tribe members. A popular sight was the pay wagon, accompanied by several armed Seminole light horsemen who rapidly unloaded the gold bullion, silver coins and paper money, and make a mad dash from the train station to the Wewoka Trading Company building, where it was delivered to A. J. Brown, who was also the Treasurer of the Seminole Nation. Brown kept the bulk payment in the company vault until he distributed it directly to the proper recipients.

The Choctaw, Oklahoma and Gulf Railroad (C O & G) built a railroad line from McAlester to Oklahoma City that passed through Wewoka. (Note: The Chicago, Rock Island & Pacific Railroad (CRI & P or Rock Island) gained control of the C O &G in 1902. The C O & G was formally merged into the Rock Island Railroad in 1948.)

The city was formally platted in 1897. The Seminole National Council ordered that decreed that the lots could be sold only to American Indians. However, the decision was overturned in 1902 and sales were opened to white settlers.

In 1907, Wewoka became part of the state of Oklahoma, which was admitted to the union. In 1908 it was designated as the county seat of Seminole County, Oklahoma, winning out in an election against the city of Seminole, Oklahoma. (Note: The election was protested, so a new election was held in 1920, but with the same result.) Early newspapers were the Wewoka Herald, Wewoka Democrat, and the Seminole County Capital.

The city developed around the house that Andrew Jackson Brown and his wife Mannie Lou built at 11th Avenue and Muskogee. Brown was the brother of Seminole Governor John Brown and the two owned and operated the Wewoka Trading Company. They were prominent Seminole of Creek and Scottish ancestry. Descendants included two prominent Seminole chiefs, Lucy Brown McKellop and her husband John F. McKellop. The house still stands, the last remaining structure of the Nineteenth Seminole Republic. It straddles the border between the Seminole and Creek nations and is listed on the National Register of Historic Places.

On March 16, 1923, oil was discovered two miles southeast of Wewoka by R. H. Smith, part of the Greater Seminole Oil Field. Great wealth was realized by many Seminole in 1925 with the exploration of the Magnolia Petroleum Company. In the 1920s and 30s the great Seminole Oil Fields were the largest suppliers of oil anywhere in the world. In 1925 the population of Wewoka was 1,520. By 1927 the population increased to over 20,000, as adventurers and workers came, to make their fortunes. It rapidly had become the third-largest city in Oklahoma.

From 1927 to the present, the oil companies took out as much as they could get. As the oil decreased, jobs and people left the city. By 1950 the population of Wewoka was 6,753 and in 1960 it was 6,300. The population continued a steady decline, but the city has continued as the commercial center of the region. The 1980s and 1990s were difficult for the city. Businesses left town and poverty greatly increased.

The city leaders tried to protect themselves by refusing to allow competition, like Wal-Mart, to enter the city. Holdenville and Seminole do have Wal-Mart stores. Seminole's Wal-Mart has the super-center configuration offering groceries as well as dry goods.

Douglass High School was established for African American students during segregation, and Frederick Douglass Moon served as a teacher and its principal.

The crime rate in Wewoka during the 1980s increased; the radio commentator Paul Harvey called Wewoka "Little Chicago," because it had a higher crime rate per capita than the city of Chicago. The violence in the city caused people to avoid coming to Wewoka and gave the city a reputation that continues to linger.

By the mid-1990s, new leadership began to turn commerce around in the city. The police force was increased and began to get the crime rate under control. The crime rate by 2001 was below average for the state of Oklahoma. The historic downtown received a face lift of new sidewalks, streets, lights and flowers. Wewoka was selected as one of Channel 5's Top Five Cities in 2004.

The city of Wewoka continues to work to attract businesses and maintain population. The current population of Wewoka is just over 3,500. The projections show that the city will continue to decrease in the coming years. The ethnic diversity continues, with 52% white, 22% American Indian and 18% African American. The average household income is approximately $37,000 a year, a substantial increase over 2002. According to the demographic comparison, the number of households is decreasing, but the income of those living in Wewoka is increasing.

== Geography ==
According to the United States Census Bureau, the city has a total area of 4.8 square miles (12.5 km^{2}), all land.

== Demographics ==
Historical population
Census	Pop.	Note	%±
1910	1,022		—
1920	1,520		48.7%
1930	10,401		584.3%
1940	10,315		−0.8%
1950	6,747		−34.6%
1960	5,954		−11.8%
1970	5,284		−11.3%
1980	5,472		3.6%
1990	4,050		−26.0%
2000	3,562		−12.0%
2010	3,430		−3.7%
2020	3,133		−8.7%
U.S. Decennial Census

=== 2020 census ===
As of the 2020 census, Wewoka had a population of 3,133. The median age was 38.5 years, 25.9% of residents were under the age of 18, and 18.8% of residents were 65 years of age or older. For every 100 females there were 92.8 males, and for every 100 females age 18 and over there were 88.9 males age 18 and over.

0% of residents lived in urban areas, while 100.0% lived in rural areas.

There were 1,151 households in Wewoka, of which 32.5% had children under the age of 18 living in them. Of all households, 30.7% were married-couple households, 24.0% were households with a male householder and no spouse or partner present, and 36.6% were households with a female householder and no spouse or partner present. About 35.7% of all households were made up of individuals and 18.3% had someone living alone who was 65 years of age or older.

There were 1,511 housing units, of which 23.8% were vacant. Among occupied housing units, 52.8% were owner-occupied and 47.2% were renter-occupied. The homeowner vacancy rate was 6.0% and the rental vacancy rate was 18.8%.

Racial composition as of the 2020 census
Race	Percent
White	47.3%
Black or African American	13.7%
American Indian and Alaska Native	23.5%
Asian	0.3%
Native Hawaiian and Other Pacific Islander	0%
Some other race	1.0%
Two or more races	14.2%
Hispanic or Latino (of any race)	4.4%

=== 2010 census ===
As of the 2010 census, there were 3,430 people, 3,177 households, and 803 families residing in Wewoka. The average household size was 2.56 and the average family size was 3.23. Less than 30% of the population was under the age of 18 and 16.3% was age 65 or older.

=== 2000 census ===
The 2000 census counted 3,271 people, 1,390 households, and 884 families residing in the city. The population density was 736.1 inhabitants per square mile (284.2/km^{2}). There were 1,762 housing units at an average density of 364.1 per square mile (140.6/km^{2}). The racial makeup of the city was 51.04% White, 19.88% African American, 21.45% Native American, 0.28% Asian, 0.08% Pacific Islander, 1.04% from other races, and 6.23% from two or more races. Hispanic or Latino of any race were 2.39% of the population.

There were 1,390 households, out of which 30.1% had children under the age of 18 living with them, 40.0% were married couples living together, 19.0% had a female householder with no husband present, and 36.4% were non-families. 33.4% of all households were made up of individuals, and 18.3% had someone living alone who was 65 years of age or older. The average household size was 2.45 and the average family size was 3.14.

In the city, the population was spread out, with 27.8% under the age of 18, 9.4% from 18 to 24, 23.4% from 25 to 44, 19.5% from 45 to 64, and 19.8% who were 65 years of age or older. The median age was 37 years. For every 100 females, there were 84.1 males. For every 100 females age 18 and over, there were 80.4 males.

The median income for a household in the city was $19,490, and the median income for a family was $27,130. Males had a median income of $22,467 versus $17,670 for females. The per capita income for the city was $12,039. About 26.6% of families and 29.8% of the population were below the poverty line, including 42.0% of those under age 18 and 20.0% of those age 65 or over.

The drive from Wewoka to the nearest major metropolitan area Oklahoma City is a little over one hour. The drive to Tulsa is a little over 1.5 hours. The nearest interstate highway to Wewoka, I-40, is 15 miles.

== Education ==
The majority of the town is in the Wewoka Public Schools school district, while a portion to the south is in the Justice Public School elementary school district.

The "2011 Academic Performance Index" score for the Wewoka School District was 749. The statewide average score for this measure for 2009–10 was 1092. In comparison, other public schools in the region scored as follows:

- Holdenville, 979
- Wetumka, 925
- Konawa, 1060
- Seminole, 966
- Varnum, 985

Wewoka Public Schools was not marked as a "School in Need of Improvement" in this state-generated report card. Although the school system was scored low, some Wewoka Public School system alumni of all races and social-strata regularly earn Ph.D.s, J.D.s, and other professional degrees in later life.

The Wewoka Public School system has a large brick high school building, designed and constructed during the Great Depression by the WPA. The high school auditorium serves for community events as well.

Wewoka is a 20-minute drive from an associate degree-granting college at Seminole State College. In addition, Wewoka is a 45-minute drive from two Ph.D.-degree-granting universities in Shawnee: Oklahoma Baptist University and St. Gregory's University (St. Gregory's University is now closed). East Central University is a 50-minute drive from Wewoka. The University of Oklahoma is an hour and 20 minutes from Wewoka, with Oklahoma State University being one hour and 45 minutes away.

== Economy ==
The first successful oil well in the Wewoka area, Betsy Foster Number One, began producing in March, 1923, leading to a boom in the population of oil field workers. Lake Wewoka was built as a reservoir to assure the city water supply, and an amusement park at the lake soon followed. Agriculture was a major component of the Wewoka economy, with important products being cotton, peaches, peanuts, pecans, and Silvermine variety of corn. Cattle raising was also important. Although the population declined significantly during and right after World War II, it began to stabilize later in the 20th century. Major employers in the city have included Wewoka Brick Company, the Wewoka Packing Plant, the Oklahoma Clothing Manufacturing Company, Lillian Russell (dress manufacturing), Acker Industries (steel products), and Plasteck Central (aircraft parts).

== Recreation ==
Wewoka Lake is to the north-northwest of town. While developed by the City of Wewoka in the 1920s as a water reservoir, opportunities at the lake today include fishing & boating; RV & primitive camping; and, swimming & water skiing.

Sportsman Lake is to the northwest. Along with the associated 1400-acre wildlife refuge which surrounds it, the lake offers boat docks and ramps; primitive campsites as well as RV sites; equestrian trails and facilities; and, other amenities.

== Governance ==
Wewoka has a council-manager form of government. The city has five wards, each of which has one representative on the city council.

== Culture ==
=== Post office ===
In 1941, as part of the New Deal projects of the Works Progress Administration, Marjorie Rowland Clarke won a federal commission from the Section of Painting and Sculpture′s projects, later called the Section of Fine Arts, of the Treasury Department to paint a mural for the Wewoka post office. The painting, Historical Background of Wewoka can still be seen in the building.

=== Museums ===
The Seminole National Museum opened in 1974, after about ten years of planning by the Seminole community in Oklahoma. It is housed in a native stone building that initially served as the Wewoka Community Center, after it was built by the Works Progress Administration (WPA) in 1934. It operates as a non-profit organization, and does not charge an admission fee to visitors. The building has expanded from the original 1,800 square feet (170 m^{2}) to 4,000 square feet (370 m^{2}) and includes display space, a research library, an arts and crafts center, an art gallery, a small office and a gift shop. The museum offers educational courses both on site and on the road (both in Oklahoma and in other parts of the United States. The museum estimates that it has had over half a million visitors from every state in the U.S. and over 100 other countries, since its opening.

Vance Trimble, a Pulitzer Prize winning news reporter, editor and author, donated an extensive collection of research materials he used in writing his book, Alice & J. F. B., a biography of Seminole chiefs Alice Brown Davis and John F. Brown. Trimble had turned down a request for these materials from the University of Oklahoma Western History Collection because the subjects of the book were central to the history of the Seminoles and the city of Wewoka.

=== Events ===
Wewoka is home to an annual Sorghum Days celebration in the fall. Sorghum molasses is prepared on-site at the Seminole Nation Museum grounds. The sorghum is cooked from cane juice pressed in an authentic mule-driven cane press, a rarity today. Sorghum is sold on fry-bread on the museum grounds for visitors to enjoy. Sorghum is not an agricultural crop of the Wewoka area; a small patch is grown for this celebration. Past Sorghum Day parade marshals include actor Ken Curtis, best known for his portrayal of Festus Haggen on the long-running CBS western television series Gunsmoke.

== Notable people ==
- Huey Battle (d. 1991), who attended Douglas High School in Wewoka, was the first African-American in Oklahoma to earn a doctoral degree from Oklahoma State University.
- Lee P. Brown (born 1937), the first African-American mayor of Houston, Texas, was born in Wewoka in 1937 to sharecropper parents. He served as public safety commissioner of Atlanta, Georgia and police chief in Houston.
- Oleta Crain (1913–2007), African-American military officer and federal civil servant.
- Dale Douglass (1936–2022), professional golfer and member of the 1969 Ryder Cup team was born in Wewoka. He joined the professional tour in 1960.
- James Coody Johnson (1864–1927), African-American lawyer practicing in or near Wewoka in the early 20th century. He testified before the U.S. Supreme court. As a Creek speaker, he served as an interpreter for the noted Judge Isaac C. Parker. For a time, he lived about 5 miles north of Wewoka. He sponsored an annual circus near his house. The J. Coody Johnson office building in Wewoka is listed on the National Register of Historic Places.
- William Shaffer Key (1889–1959), American military officer, lived in Wewoka prior to World War I.
- Gil Morgan (born 1946), professional golfer and current member of the Champions Tour was born in Wewoka. He joined the professional tour in 1972 and won seven events between 1977 and 1990. His more prominent success has been in the Champions Tour where he has won 24 events, including the Tradition title in 1997 and 1998, and the Senior Players Championship in 1998.
- Don E. Schultz (1934–2020), most notable for his research and writing on Integrated Marketing Communications and considered the "father" of that discipline. Longtime faculty member of Northwestern University, and one of the 80 Most Influential People in sales and marketing according to Sales and Marketing Management magazine. Born in Wewoka; graduated high school in nearby Seminole, Oklahoma.
- Juanita Kidd Stout (1919–1998), the first African-American woman elected as judge in the United States, was born in Wewoka. She graduated from a segregated high school in Wewoka at the age of 16. She spent a significant part of her career as a judge in Philadelphia. She regularly returned to Oklahoma, spending time in Tulsa for summer breaks. In addition, she was the first black woman to serve on any state's supreme court. She is buried at the Westwood Cemetery in Wewoka.
- Vance Trimble (1913–2021), American journalist and Pulitzer Prize winner. Lived briefly in Wewoka from 1929 to 1931; then retired to Wewoka after his wife died in 1999.
- James Thrash (born April 28, 1975) is a former American football wide receiver. He was signed by the Philadelphia Eagles as an undrafted free agent in 1997. He played college football at Missouri Southern State University.Thrash also played for the Washington Redskins. He currently works on the Commanders' player development staff.
- Mack Lyon (1921-2015) was a televangelist who hosted In Search of the Lord's Way from 1980 to 2010.
