= John Brown (Seminole chief) =

Last principal chief of the Seminole Nation and Confederate States Army officer

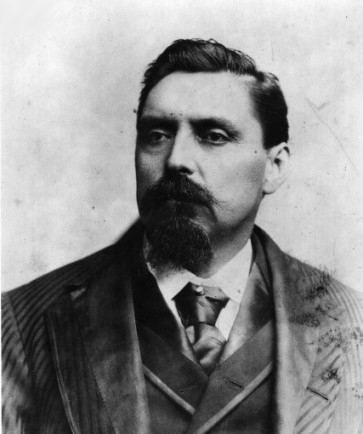
- John Brown

Last Principal Chief of the Seminole Tribe of Oklahoma, 1885-1901, 1905-1906 leader
- Preceded by: Big John Chupco / John Jumper
- Succeeded by: Hulputta Micco

Personal details
- Born: October 23, 1842 Near Fort Gibson, Oklahoma
- Died: October 21, 1919 (aged 76) Sasakwa, Oklahoma
- Spouse(s): Lizzie Jumper, and two other wives
- Relations: Brother, Andrew Jackson Brown, sister, Alice Brown Davis
- Children: Twelve known children
- Parent(s): Dr. John Frippo Brown, Lucy Nancy Redbeard
- Known for: Confederate States Army officer

John Frippo Brown (October 23, 1842 – October 21, 1919) was the last principal chief of the Seminole Nation, serving 1885–1901 and 1905–1906. He served as a Confederate States Army officer during the American Civil War.

== Early life and education ==
John Brown was born into the Tiger Clan of his Seminole mother, Lucy Nancy Greybeard, on October 23, 1842, near Fort Gibson, Oklahoma. He was of mixed race and was the eldest child of seven; their father was Dr. John Frippo Brown, Sr., a physician from Scotland. He had six siblings, including Alice Brown Davis, who in 1922 was appointed as the Seminoles' first woman chief. A brother was Andrew Jackson Brown, who later served the tribe as treasurer. They were raised in both their parents' cultures but lived among and identified as Seminole. He is listed as 1/2nd Seminole by Blood on the Dawes Rolls.

Brown served in the Confederate Army as an officer under the Seminole chief John Jumper. He represented the Seminole Nation in postwar negotiations as a Southern Treaty Commission Delegate and signed the Reconstruction Treaty of 1866.

In 1867, Brown's parents died in a cholera epidemic. His 15-year-old sister Alice moved from their home near Fort Gibson to Wewoka, Oklahoma to live with him.

== Chief of the Seminole Nation ==
After the Seminole Nation agreed to the Reconstruction Treaty of 1866, there was a period of friction due to the U.S. government's recognition of Big John Chupco as the Chief of the Seminole. However, the majority of the tribe followed the leadership of John Jumper. The tribe soon elected its own chief and chose Jumper, who resigned soon afterward. Brown, who was a member of the Tiger Clan and Jumper's son-in-law, was next elected chief. His younger brother Andrew Jackson Brown served as treasurer.

Brown served as "governor" of the tribe from 1885 to 1901, when Hulputta Micco defeated him. Following Micco's death in 1905, Brown was re-elected and served until tribal government was abolished in 1906 in preparation for admitting the Indian and Oklahoma territories as the state of Oklahoma.

Brown negotiated the Seminole agreement with the Dawes Commission in 1897, which preceded the division of communal land into plots for separate households, as part of a plan for assimilation to majority culture. He served as a delegate to the Sequoyah Constitutional Convention in 1905, the effort by Native Americans in Indian Territory to write a constitution for an all-Indian-controlled state, to be admitted separately from the eastern section of present-day Oklahoma. They were unsuccessful in gaining US Congressional approval for such an action.

As chief of the tribe, Brown traveled to Washington, D.C., frequently to meet with national leaders. During that time he befriended U.S. President Theodore Roosevelt.

== Personal life ==
Brown owned a ranch southeast of Wewoka and ran the Wewoka Trading Company with his brother Andrew. Ordained as a minister, he was the pastor of the Spring Baptist Church from 1894 until his death.

He married Lizzie Jumper, whose father served as chief of the Seminole shortly after the Civil War. After her death, Brown married twice more. He had at least 12 known children.

== Death ==
John Frippo Brown died at Sasakwa, Oklahoma on October 21, 1919.
