= Alice Brown Davis =

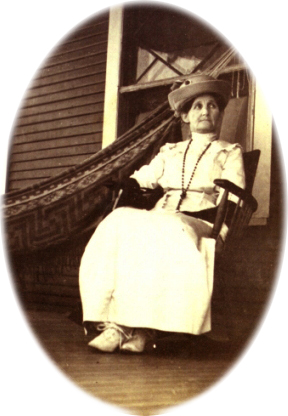
- Alice Brown Davis

Principal Chief of the Seminole Nation of Oklahoma
- In office 1922–1935
- Preceded by: Hulbutta Micco
- Succeeded by: Chief Chili Fish

Personal details
- Born: September 10, 1852 Park Hill, Indian Territory
- Died: June 21, 1935 (aged 82) Wewoka, Oklahoma
- Spouse: George Rollin Davis (m. 1874)
- Relations: Older brothers, John F. and Andrew Jackson Brown
- Children: Eleven children
- Parent(s): Dr. John Frippo Brown, Lucy Red Bird
- Education: Ramsay Mission School

Alice Brown Davis (September 10, 1852 – June 21, 1935) was the first female Principal Chief of the Seminole Nation of Oklahoma, and served from 1922 to 1935, appointed by President Warren G. Harding. She was of Seminole (Tiger Clan) and Scots descent. Her older brother John Frippo Brown had served as chief of the tribe and their brother Andrew Jackson Brown as treasurer.

== Early life and education ==
Alice Brown was born on September 10, 1852, in the Cherokee town of Park Hill, Indian Territory and grew up near Fort Gibson. Her father, Dr. John Frippo Brown, was from Scotland and a graduate of the University of Edinburgh. He accompanied the Seminole as a military surgeon during their forced removal from Florida. During this journey, he married Lucy Red Bird, a Seminole from Katcvlke or the Tiger Clan. As the Seminole have a matrilineal system, the children of a marriage belonged to the mother's clan. Her parents had a total of seven children. She is listed as 1/2nd Seminole by Blood on the Dawes Rolls.

Her older brothers John F. and Andrew Jackson Brown each started to serve the tribe by the time of the American Civil War. Four members of her mother's family developed as significant Seminole leaders from 1832 to 1935. Like her brothers, Alice Brown was well educated. One of her influential teachers was Caroline Bushyhead, a Cherokee. She learned both English and Mikasuki as first languages, and also attended the Ramsay Mission School, started by the Episcopal Church and then operated by Baptist missionaries.

During 1867, when Alice was 15 years old, a cholera epidemic broke out among the Seminole tribe, and she assisted her father in caring for the sick. After the epidemic, both her parents died, and she went to live with her oldest brother John at his ranch at Wewoka, the capital of the Seminole Nation. After completing her studies, Brown taught, most likely at Mesukey Academy for Boys in Sasakwa. Both there and likely at the girls' school Emakwha Academy, Brown Davis likely taught children of freedmen along with the Seminole, for the missionaries integrated the schools in 1874.

== Marriage and family ==
In 1874 at the age of 22, Brown married George Rollin Davis, a European-American merchant from Kansas. They moved to Arbeka, Indian Territory on Seminole Nation lands. They operated a trading post, post office, general store and the Bar X Bar ranch together until George's death. They were entrusted with the duties of disbursing the local Indians' headright money and the Civil War pensions for veterans and widows. Together the couple had eleven children.

George Davis died when Brown Davis' youngest child was still a toddler.

== Career ==
After 1885, she often worked with her brother, Chief John F. Brown, as an interpreter, liaison and assistant for the Seminole Tribe. She gained a broad knowledge of tribal issues.

In her 40s after her husband's death, Brown Davis became the postmistress of Arbeka, while running the ranch and trading post. She became the superintendent of the Seminole Nation's girls' school, Emahaka. Built in 1892, Emahaka was a highly modern institution teaching grades one through ten.

In order to enable Oklahoma to become a state, the federal government had required the end of tribal governments in Indian Territory. The tribes were supposed to turn over all functions to officials of the Bureau of Indian Affairs. Protective of her school and believing that Indians should be in charge of teaching their children, Brown Davis initially refused to yield authority over the school. Her brother John F. Brown was still Chief of the Seminole and finally persuaded her she had to yield under the law.

Brown Davis belonged to the congregation of the Spring Baptist Church at Sasakwa, Oklahoma, where her brother John became the pastor. She performed missionary work in Florida and was active in Muscogee Creek, Seminole, and Wichita Baptist Associations.

== Tribal governance ==
The Curtis Act dismantled tribal governmental and civic institutions. The Dawes Act broke up tribal landholdings, distributing allotments to individual households of registered tribal members. Land in excess of that was declared "surplus" by the federal government and sold to non-Indians. The 1906 Five Civilized Tribes Act finalized US federal government's dismemberment of tribal governments to make way for Oklahoma statehood in 1907.

During this tumultuous time, Brown Davis acted as an interpreter in court cases, as she was bilingual in English and Mikasuki. In 1903, she traveled to Mexico with a Seminole delegation to pursue possible land grant claims there. She returned in 1905 and 1910, but the outbreak of the Mexican Revolution destroyed Seminole hopes of settlement in Mexico.

In 1922, at the age of 70, Davis was appointed Principal Chief of the Seminole Nation by President Warren G. Harding. She was the first female chief of the Seminole tribe, and initially her appointment was controversial, despite her maternal clan's prominence. Eventually she won the support of her people and served until her death.

A key issue of her term was tribal land affairs. Based on a new survey of Seminole land in 1910, the US federal government reassigned some lands to the Muscogee Creek Nation, including the grounds of the Emakaha School and several Seminole churches. Brown Davis refused to sign the deeds over to the Creek and said, "If this be the cause of my resignation I will feel that I have done that which is right and just to myself and my people." Because of the long period of indecision about the land, the Emakaha School had to be emptied. It burned down and was not rebuilt.

== Death and legacy ==
Alice Brown Davis served as chief until her death on June 21, 1935, in Wewoka, Oklahoma. In 1961, she was inducted into the recently founded National Hall of Fame for Famous Native Americans in Anadarko, Oklahoma, and also the Oklahoma Hall of Fame. The University of Oklahoma named Davis Hall in her honor. At the 1964 World's Fair on Oklahoma Day, a bronze bust of her, sculpted by Willard Stone, was unveiled in Queens, New York.

== See also ==
- List of Native American politicians
- Native American women in politics
