= Sasakwa, Oklahoma =

Town in the United States

Sasakwa, Oklahoma Sasakwv (Creek)
- Town
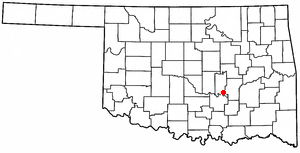
- Location of Sasakwa, Oklahoma
- Coordinates: 34°56′48″N 96°31′31″W
- Country: United States
- State: Oklahoma
- County: Seminole

Area
  - Total: 0.21 sq mi (0.55 km^{2})
  - Land: 0.21 sq mi (0.55 km^{2})
  - Water: 0 sq mi (0.00 km^{2})
- Elevation: 827 ft (252 m)

Population (2020)
  - Total: 80
  - Density: 374.7/sq mi (144.69/km^{2})
- Time zone: UTC-6 (Central (CST))
  - Summer (DST): UTC-5 (CDT)
- ZIP code: 74867
- Area code: 405
- FIPS code: 40-65500
- GNIS feature ID: 2413261

Sasakwa (Creek: Sasakwv) is a town in Seminole County, Oklahoma, United States. The population was 80 as of the 2020 census.

== History ==
Sasakwa was originally located at a site 12 miles (19 km) west of the present townsite, where Governor John E Brown, Seminole, established a trading post, cotton gin, and 16 room mansion where he fed vagrants and poor. A post office was established in 1880, and took the name from that given his trading post by Gov John E Brown, from the Seminole word meaning "wild goose". Sasakwa Female Academy existed at Sasakwa from 1880 to 1892. At that time Sasakwa was part of the [not sure it was Creek, part of Seminole nation today] Nation in the Indian Territory. The site of the present town was moved to where the train station was located.

In 1917, hundreds of men gathered on a farm near Sasakwa to protest the draft in World War I, an event called the Green Corn Rebellion.

== Geography ==
Sasakwa is located 13 miles (21 km) south of Wewoka, the county seat. According to the United States Census Bureau, the town has a total area of 0.2 square miles (0.52 km^{2}), all land.

The town is on Oklahoma State Highway 56; Lake Konawa is to the west.

== Demographics ==
Historical population
Census	Pop.	Note	%±
1910	241		—
1920	355		47.3%
1930	781		120.0%
1940	532		−31.9%
1950	365		−31.4%
1960	253		−30.7%
1970	321		26.9%
1980	335		4.4%
1990	169		−49.6%
2000	150		−11.2%
2010	150		0.0%
2020	80		−46.7%
U.S. Decennial Census

=== 2020 census ===
As of the 2020 census, Sasakwa had a population of 80. The median age was 38.0 years. 23.7% of residents were under the age of 18 and 25.0% of residents were 65 years of age or older. For every 100 females there were 77.8 males, and for every 100 females age 18 and over there were 84.8 males age 18 and over.

0.0% of residents lived in urban areas, while 100.0% lived in rural areas.

There were 31 households in Sasakwa, of which 41.9% had children under the age of 18 living in them. Of all households, 32.3% were married-couple households, 25.8% were households with a male householder and no spouse or partner present, and 32.3% were households with a female householder and no spouse or partner present. About 22.6% of all households were made up of individuals and 3.2% had someone living alone who was 65 years of age or older.

There were 44 housing units, of which 29.5% were vacant. The homeowner vacancy rate was 11.1% and the rental vacancy rate was 0.0%.

Racial composition as of the 2020 census
Race	Number	Percent
White	46	57.5%
Black or African American	2	2.5%
American Indian and Alaska Native	20	25.0%
Asian	0	0.0%
Native Hawaiian and Other Pacific Islander	0	0.0%
Some other race	1	1.2%
Two or more races	11	13.8%
Hispanic or Latino (of any race)	3	3.8%

=== 2000 census ===
As of the census of 2000, there were 150 people, 58 households, and 41 families residing in the town. The population density was 714.8 inhabitants per square mile (276.0/km^{2}). There were 77 housing units at an average density of 367.0 per square mile (141.7/km^{2}). The racial makeup of the town was 61.33% White, 1.33% African American, 28.67% Native American, and 8.67% from two or more races.

There were 58 households, out of which 27.6% had children under the age of 18 living with them, 48.3% were married couples living together, 19.0% had a female householder with no husband present, and 27.6% were non-families. 25.9% of all households were made up of individuals, and 15.5% had someone living alone who was 65 years of age or older. The average household size was 2.59 and the average family size was 3.02.

In the town, the population was spread out, with 30.7% under the age of 18, 9.3% from 18 to 24, 22.7% from 25 to 44, 20.7% from 45 to 64, and 16.7% who were 65 years of age or older. The median age was 35 years. For every 100 females, there were 74.4 males. For every 100 females age 18 and over, there were 79.3 males.

The median income for a household in the town was $20,750, and the median income for a family was $24,286. Males had a median income of $23,750 versus $13,542 for females. The per capita income for the town was $9,353. There were 19.6% of families and 24.3% of the population living below the poverty line, including 33.3% of under eighteens and 32.1% of those over 64.

== Education ==
It is in the Sasakwa Public Schools school district.

== Notable people ==
Sasakwa was home to Seminole Chiefs John Jumper and John F. Brown.
