= Seminole Nation of Oklahoma =

Native American tribe in Oklahoma

Seminole Nation of Oklahoma Este Semvnole Etvlwv (Creek)
- Indian reservation
- Location (red) in the U.S. state of Oklahoma
- Indian Removal: 1842
- Reservation Reconstituted: July 9, 2020; 6 years ago
- Capital: Wewoka, Oklahoma

Government
  - Body: Seminole Nation General Council
  - Principal Chief: Sena Yesslith (D)
  - Assistant Chief: Sheila Harjo (D)
  - Executive Secretary: Judy Jones (D)

Population
  - Total: 18,800
- Demonym: Seminole
- Time zone: UTC−06:00
  - Summer (DST): UTC−05:00 (CDT)
- Website: sno-nsn.gov

The Seminole Nation of Oklahoma (Creek: Este Semvnole Etvlwv) is a federally recognized Native American tribe based in the U.S. state of Oklahoma. It is the largest of the three federally recognized Seminole governments, which include the Seminole Tribe of Florida and the Miccosukee Tribe of Indians of Florida. Its citizens are descendants of the approximately 3,000 Seminoles who were forcibly removed from Florida to Indian Territory, along with 800 Black Seminoles, after the Second Seminole War. The Seminole Nation of Oklahoma is headquartered in Wewoka within Seminole County, Oklahoma. Of 18,800 enrolled tribal citizens, 13,533 live in Oklahoma. The tribe began to revive its government in 1936 under the Indian Reorganization Act. While its reservation was originally larger, today the tribal reservation and jurisdictional area covers Seminole County, Oklahoma, within which it has a variety of properties.

The few hundred Seminoles remaining in Florida fought against US forces in the Third Seminole war, and peace was made without their defeat. Today, descendants of those people have formed two federally recognized tribes. Together, the three tribes and unorganized Traditionals in Florida were awarded a land claims settlement valued in total at $16 million in 1976, for nearly 24 million acres of lands seized by the United States government in Florida in 1823; amounting to roughly $0.67 an acre.

== History ==
=== Florida ===
The history of the Seminole Nation of Oklahoma derives from the ethnogenesis of the tribe in Florida. The Seminole were composed of Indigenous American peoples who migrated into Florida after most of the original Indigenous tribes had declined or moved.

The Spanish explorer Pedro Menéndez de Avilés founded St. Augustine in 1565, the first permanent settlement in Florida after at least 60 years of sporadic Spanish visitation. He encountered complex Indigenous cultures whose people lived by hunting, fishing, farming and raising stock. Tribes from three different basic language groups: the Timuquan, Calusan, and Muskhogean, occupied Florida and lived in small and well-organized villages.

Although today the term Seminole is used, this name originated due to a European misnomer, which categorized a diverse group of autonomous tribes together under the name Seminole. The Spanish first recognized the speakers of the "core language" Mvskoke, and called them cimarrones, or "free people" (Seminole). Translated through several languages to English, this term came to apply to all of Florida's 18th-century inhabitants, and their neighbors who later fled to join them under pressure of European encroachment into their territories. The Seminole absorbed remnants of other Florida tribes into their own. The Oconee were the original "Seminole," who later included the Hecete, Eufaula, Mikasuki, Horrewahle, Tallahassee, Chiaha, and Apalachicola.

The Muscogee Creek Confederacy had a strong, longstanding presence in the Southeast. Fugitive runaway slaves and those freed under Spanish rule set up neighboring maroon communities and were close allies of the Indians. There was some intermarriage, but mostly the two peoples retained independent cultures, according to studies since the late 20th century. The blacks were armed and became allies in military conflicts. The African Americans became known as Black Seminoles or Seminole Maroons. The term cimarrones in Spanish was initially transliterated by the Creek as semvlonē. Semvlonē eventually morphed into Semvnole (still pronounced sem-uh-no-lee by Indigenous speakers).

The United States conducted the First Seminole War beginning in 1818, to reduce Seminole raids on Georgia communities and to break up armed black communities. In 1821 the US acquired Florida from Spain. White settlers, in search for additional fertile land, pressured government to move the Seminole. In 1823 the US forced most of the Seminole from northern areas of the territory to a reservation in central Florida under the Treaty of Moultrie Creek. Seminoles continued to leave the reservation and a second war was begun, the most expensive for the US, with many troops committed.

After the Second Seminole War of the 1830s, an estimated 3,000 Seminole and 800 Black Seminoles were removed to Indian Territory, with many taken by ship across the Gulf of Mexico and up the Mississippi for part of the journey. They were first put under the Creek on their reservation. The 1830s was the period of removal for the other of the "Five Civilized Tribes" of the American Southeast.

A few hundred Seminole remained in the Florida Everglades. With guerilla warfare, they resisted US forces during the Third and last Seminole War, when the US withdrew. Today their descendants have formed the federally recognized Seminole Tribe of Florida and Miccosukee Tribe of Indians of Florida.

=== Indian Territory ===
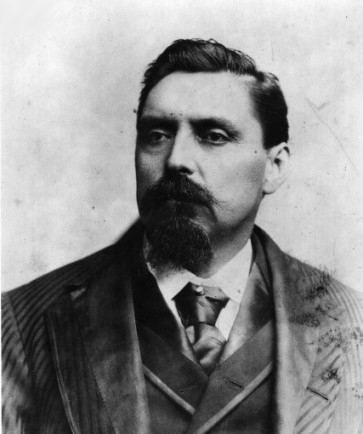
John Frippo Brown, Principal Chief of the Seminole Nation

After removal, the Oklahoma and Florida Seminole developed independently and had little contact for nearly 100 years. By the terms of a 1832 treaty, Seminole people were initially forced to share a reservation with the Muscogee Nation, however in 1845 United States promised to give the Seminole people their own reservation.

Micanopy, who had been principal chief since 1825, led the Seminole struggle to gain an independent reservation which succeeded in 1856. He died in 1849, after separate lands had been promised by the US for 1855. His sister's sons, John Jumper (1849–1853) and Jim Jumper (1853–1866), succeeded him as principal chiefs before the US began to interfere with tribal government.

While the Seminole maintained political independence from the Creek, the two peoples became closer through the 19th and early 20th centuries, as they shared strong cultural traditions and began to intermarry. The Seminole reservation originally encompassed what is now Seminole County, a roughly 15-mile strip between the Canadian River and North Canadian River, a total of 360,000 acres (1,500 km^{2}). The United States urged the Indians on reservations to adopt subsistence agriculture, but less than half the land was good for agriculture, and a third was not useful for stock raising or agriculture.

The Black Seminoles again developed towns near the Seminole as they had in the Florida frontier. Except for the struggle to protect their people against slave raiders from outside their communities, they enjoyed good relations with the Seminole.

After the American Civil War, in which many Seminole, including John Frippo Brown last Principal Chief of the Seminole Nation, had allied with the Confederacy, they were forced to make some land cessions under a new treaty with the US government. These included allocating a portion of their reservation for the Seminole Freedmen following emancipation of slaves in Indian Territory in 1866. The treaty granted the Black Seminoles who chose to stay on the reservation full citizenship in the tribe.

As they had in Florida, the Seminole strongly discouraged intermarriage with whites or adoption of European-American ways. In 1900 they were still mostly full bloods. They generally had little intermarriage with the Seminole maroons, who were recognized as having their own distinct culture. As the Seminole had a matrilineal kinship system, they believed children belonged to their mother's people. Mixed-race children belonged to the mother's people, whichever race that was.

Following the Seminole Agreement of 1909, the Seminole lands were allotted to individual households registered on the Dawes Rolls, in a federal plan to encourage subsistence farming and assimilation. Numerous interests wanted to extinguish the communal tribal lands to gain admission of Oklahoma (including Indian Territory) as a state. In 1900 the Seminole Freedmen numbered about 1,000, nearly one-third of the total Seminole tribe in Oklahoma. The Dawes Commission established two separate registration rolls for Seminole Indians and Freedmen. They became United States citizens in a racially segregated state.

The Seminole Freedmen suffered extra legal discrimination and restrictions in the state. Some left for Canada or other states. The segregation of the larger society drove a wedge between the communities. The Freedmen quickly lost land through unscrupulous land sharks, as their land sales were not supervised by the Indian Bureau. The Seminole also lost land, sometimes through the actions of overseers who were supposed to help them.

=== Current conditions ===
Today the Seminole Nation of Oklahoma is located in Seminole County, Oklahoma. The entire county of Seminole is a portion of the original Seminole Nation jurisdiction, and covers approximately 633 square miles. The county is a checkerboard of tribal trust property, Indian allotments, restricted Indian lands, and dependent Indian communities. Native Americans make up 22% of the population of Seminole County.

The Seminole County service population is 5,315 Tribal citizens, according to the Seminole Nation Tribal Enrollment Office. The total enrollment of the Seminole Nation of Oklahoma is approximately 17,000 citizens. According to 2000 U.S. Census data for Seminole County, the self-identified Native American (one race only) population is 4,328, and the Native American (one race or combination with other race) population is 5,485.

As of the Spring of 2022, the Chief was Lewis Johnson.

== Government ==
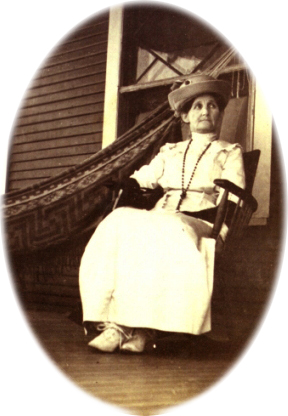
Alice Brown Davis (1852–1935), first woman to serve as Seminole Nation principal chief

As of 2025, the current administration is:

- Chief: Lewis J. Johnson
- Assistant Chief: Brian T. Palmer

The Seminole Nation of Oklahoma is a constitutional democracy headquartered in Wewoka, Oklahoma.

The 1898 Curtis Act threatened the existence of the tribe's government, but Congress continued the recognition of tribal governments indefinitely in 1906. With the Indian Citizenship Act of 1924, the Seminole became US citizens and received some services from the Bureau of Indian Affairs (BIA). Having enjoyed a unique alliance, the Seminoles (mostly full-blood) and the Seminole Freedmen became part of the segregated state of Oklahoma, which adversely affected their relations.

Under the Indian Reorganization Act of 1934, the Seminoles reorganized their government. At the time, some who had been opposed to Seminole Freedmen being allocated land also opposed their participation in government. As the Seminole Nation developed its constitution, some citizens wanted to exclude Seminole Maroons from the tribe, but the Constitution of the 1950s recognizes Freedmen as citizens.

On March 8, 1969, the Seminole Nation ratified a constitution, which restructured their government along more traditional lines. The Nation has been composed since the 19th century of 14 etvlwv, (Note: Also spelled itálwa, atilwa) matrilineal town bands, including two Freedmen bands, which each represent several towns. This social structure is also the basis of the Seminole political and religious life. Each band has an elected band chief and assistant band chief and meets monthly.

Each band elects two representatives to the General Council. Each band is governed by a set of bylaws that originate from the band. This structure was approved by the Commission of Indian Affairs on April 15, 1969.

The Seminole General Council, chaired by the Principal Chief and Assistant Chief, serves at the elected governing body. The Chief and Assistant Chief are elected at large every four years.

On July 1, 2000, the Seminole Nation held a referendum for a constitutional amendment establishing new enrollment rules: it said that citizens had to have one-eighth blood quantum (essentially documented descent from an Indian citizens on the Dawes Rolls). The General Council prohibited representatives from the two Freedmen Bands from participating. As a result of the change, about 1,200 Freedmen were excluded from citizenship and most benefits afforded to the tribe. The BIA said the referendum was invalid. The Nation sued the government, saying in Seminole Nation of Oklahoma v. Babbitt (later Seminole Nation of Oklahoma v. Norton) that it had the right to determine its own citizenship. The District Court for the District of Columbia rejected the Nation's arguments and restored the Freedmen citizenship and voting rights.

Tribal headquarters are located in Wewoka, Oklahoma, the seat of Seminole County. The general council meets at the council house on the Mekusukey Mission Tribal Grounds south of Seminole. The Nation has been developing a new tribal constitution that will eliminate the role of the Bureau of Indian Affairs (BIA) in tribal government operations.

Tribal government departments include administrative, executive, fiscal affairs, treasury, domestic violence, Indian Child Welfare, family and social services, enrollment, gaming, housing, education, language, communications, elder services, environmental, law enforcement, dialysis, youth, child care, roads, and Head start. Tribal departments are funded with either tribal revenue or federal/ state funding.

== Language ==
Historically, the Seminole spoke two mutually unintelligible Muskogean languages, Mikasuki (Mekusukey) and Muscogee. Muscogee was the dominant language in politics and society, so Mikasuki speakers also learned Muscogee. As of 2002, about one-quarter of the tribe still spoke Muscogee, and most of these, English; the remainder spoke only English. Mikasuki is extinct in Oklahoma (the latter is spoken among a majority of Miccosukee and Seminole in Florida).

English is the primary language of most of the Seminole Nation of Oklahoma. The tribe is establishing a Seminole Nation Language Program to revitalize its traditional Muscogee language.

== Location and land status ==
Today, the tribe manages 372 acres (1.51 km^{2}) of land held in trust by the federal government as their reservation. They have approximately 53 acres (0.21 km^{2}) of fee-simple land. An additional 35,443 acres (143.43 km^{2}) are allotted to supplement the tribal land base. The Seminole Tribal Jurisdiction Area, where it provides services to its citizens, includes most of Seminole County in south-central Oklahoma, approximately 45 miles east of Oklahoma City.

The Seminole Nation Tribal Complex is located in the town of Wewoka. The junction of U.S. 270 and Oklahoma Highway 56 is located at the town, approximately 30 miles southeast of the town of Shawnee. Wewoka is the site of several Seminole Nation programs and services.

The Mekusukey Mission (which includes tribal offices, recreational areas, industrial and commercial areas, and a cultural area) is located 2 miles south and 2 miles west of the city of Seminole.

== Land claims and trust suits ==
By 1961 the Oklahoma and Florida Seminole independently filed claims with the Indian Claims Commission for compensation for lands seized in Florida in 1823 at the time of the Treaty of Moultrie Creek, by which the Seminoles had moved into a reservation in central Florida, giving up their northern lands.

The federal government combined the claims and in 1976 awarded a total of $16 million to the peoples. They struggled for more than a decade to allocate it, leading to negotiations between the Oklahoma and Florida groups and more sustained contact than they had had for a century. The Miccosukee and Traditionals initially opposed settling for claims rather than seeking the return of land.

By this time, the Seminole Tribe of Florida and the Miccosukee Tribe of Indians of Florida had achieved federal recognition, and the Traditionals had legal representation. Richmond Tiger was Principal Chief of the Seminole Nation of Oklahoma. The settlement was put into a trust, earning interest.

In 1990, the groups agreed to the Seminole Nation of Oklahoma receiving three-quarters, based on early records from 1906-1914, when citizens had blood quantum, and the Florida Seminole to receive one-quarter, based on a reconstructed early 20th-century censuses. The Florida tribes and Traditionals had a higher percentage of full-bloods, and blood quantum requirements for citizenship. By 1990, the total settlement award was valued at $46 million with interest.

The Seminole Nation of Oklahoma declined to share the settlement benefits with Seminole Freedmen citizens, as the Black Seminoles had not been legally recognized in 1823 as citizens of the tribe. They contended they also had lost land which they owned and occupied. After failing to gain concessions from the Nation, two Freedmen's Bands filed suit against the Department of Interior in 1996. The BIA noted that, as legal citizens of the Seminole Nation since 1866, the Freedmen were supposed to share in all benefits. Their case was dismissed from federal district court, which said the Freedmen could not bring suit without the Seminole Nation's joining. Their appeal at that level also lost, and in 2004, the US Supreme Court affirmed that they could not sue without participation of the Nation.

In the meantime, in 2000, the Seminole Nation voted to restrict citizens to those of one-eighth blood quantum, essentially those with documented descent from ancestors listed as "Seminole by Blood" on the Dawes Rolls. This excluded numerous Freedmen who, although descending from an Indian ancestor, had only a Freedman ancestor listed on the Rolls. The registrars had tended to classify all persons of visible African ancestry as Freedmen, even if the individual had Seminole ancestry and was at the time considered an Indian citizen of the tribe. About 1,200 Freedmen were dropped from tribal citizenship rolls.

== Economic development and programs ==
The Seminole Nation of Oklahoma operates three gaming casinos, three tribal smoke shops, three gasoline stations, and a truck stop, which generate revenues for welfare, education, housing, and economic development. They operate their own housing authority, an alcohol and substance abuse program, a business and corporate regulatory commission, several family services, a food distribution program, environmental protection program, and social service programs. They issue their own tribal vehicle tags. In addition, the tribe administers their share of the judgment trust from the 1990 land claim settlement, from which citizens can draw for educational and other benefits. Their annual economic impact was $81 million in 2010.

== Tourism and recreation ==
The Nation holds its annual celebration, Seminole Nation Days, on the third weekend in September at the Mekusukey Mission Grounds, to celebrate tribal heritage and culture. The event is free and open to the public. The Nation provides free concerts, carnivals, and cultural events with the featured performer on Saturday evening. Other events include an art contest, banquet, princess pageant, cultural events, parade, and sports competitions. Food, art, and craft vendors and demonstrators are also on-site. A free traditional dinner is provided. Estimated attendance is 10,000.

The Mekusukey Mission has RV campsite facilities available year-round for a nominal fee. Also at the Mission are softball fields and a gymnasium, where tribal citizens hold athletic and cultural events year-round.

Traditional dances are held throughout the spring and summer months at ceremonial grounds. Visitors are reminded to treat cultural ceremonies and grounds with utmost respect and decorum. Invited attendees must adhere to the strict cultural guidelines and refrain from taking any photographs, videos and sound recordings.

Located in the town of Wewoka, the Seminole Nation Museum features exhibits on Seminole culture and history. An adjoining gallery and craft shop features contemporary and traditional Seminole crafts, including the women's brilliant patchwork textiles.

== Media and communications ==
A monthly newspaper the Cokv Tvlvme, publishes and distributes 10,000 copies directly to tribal citizens and as supplements in local papers. The Nation also produces a weekly radio program every Tuesday at 11 am on KWSH 1260AM. An interactive website, located at www.sno-nsn.gov, is updated regularly.

== Cultural ceremonies ==
For Seminole people who continue to observe traditional cultural ceremonial practices, life revolves around a cycle of ritual activities at the "ceremonial or stomp grounds." In modern times, these places of communion are where ceremonial dances, dinners, and ball games take place, mainly during weekends throughout the spring, summer, and early fall months.

Originally the individual town bands or etvlwv would physically organize in groups around the ceremonial ring. Seminole ceremonialism, based in Creek culture, guided every aspect of tribal life. Ceremonial teachings continue to guide those who participate in these traditions in modern times. The rituals were associated with major seasons and cycles of the year - related to planting and harvest, especially, and renewal of fertility.

Today the "ceremonial cycle" consists of four or five dances throughout the "dance season," of which Green Corn or Posketv-rakko (Big fast) is the most important. Depending on the ceremonial ground, Green Corn can last from four days (Thursday – Sunday) to seven days (Sunday – Sunday). Friday is known as Hoktak-'pvnkv Nettv (Women's Dance Day), when the Ribbon Dance occurs. Friday is also the day of the Yvnvsv 'Pvnkv (Buffalo Dance) for those ceremonial grounds whose dancers perform this dance. The signature dance, which takes place during the day on Saturday, is the Cetvhayv 'Pvnkv, or the Feather Dance, as it is commonly referred to in English.

During Green Corn, as well as the other ceremonies, participants commit to dancing, fasting, medicine taking, work, and other ritual activities. The purifying herbal medicine is accompanied by "scratching" of the participants' bodies. Generally administered to the arms and legs, but not limited to these areas, "scratching" is performed to alleviate spiritual and medical ailments by strengthening the individual. Green Corn can be likened to the combined equivalent of the European-American holidays of Thanksgiving, New Year's, and Easter.

During Green Corn, strained relationships among the tribe are to be reconciled and participants are expected to forgive the wrongs that occurred during the year. The nighttime songs refer to acknowledgement of tribal ancestors, spiritual entities, historical events, thanksgiving, and well wishing or prayers for the coming year. Daybreak on Sunday marks the completion of the Green Corn ceremony and the beginning of the new year for the ground members.

After removal, the Seminole established eight ceremonial grounds in Indian Territory. Today one, Ceyahv (Gar Creek), has a full ceremonial cycle observed with complete rituals by participants.

== Clan law ==
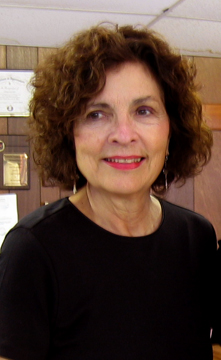
Mary Jo Watson, enrolled tribal citizens, former director of OU School of Art, and art historian

The clans are a fundamental part of Seminole society based on kinship patterns. Historically, clans have been identified with certain animals and spiritual beings to assist them. Upon doing so, individuals vowed to keep commitments associated with their particular being to remain in association from that point forward.

Over time, groups of people connected by descent became associated with particular animal spirits. They had duties as a clan related to the place of this spirit figure in their overall tribal religion. Various creation stories relate the hierarchy and symbolism of the various clans, and each clan represents essential qualities and responsibilities. These pertain to specific jobs or position held in the tribal ceremonial ground, as well as in the towns and at home. Each clan had a special talent, as well as a balance of weaknesses for various aspects of the spiritual world. The majority of Seminole people in the 21st century continue to identify with their clans.

Clan law and kinship are highly revered by the Seminole people, and are integral to their spiritual and ceremonial world. Clan law traditionally governs every aspect of tribal life, from the spiritual, to the governmental, to the social, including marriage rules.

The kinship systems is matrilineal; descent and inheritance are passed through the mother's lines. Children are born into their mother's clan and take their social status from that group. For example, if an individual's mother is of the Wotkvlke or Raccoon Clan, and the father is of the Hvlpvtvlke or Alligator Clan, that individual would belong to the Raccoon Clan. However, this person would also be related to the Alligator Clan, as a son or daughter. (The Navajo, who have a similar system, say that a child is born "to" the mother's clan and "for" the father's clan.) All other Raccoon Clan people and Alligator Clan people are considered the child's relations. Depending on the generation, they would be referred to as aunts and uncles, if the age of a fellow clansman was relative to that of the mother and father, or brother and sister, if the age of the clansman was relative to that of the child.

In this system, Seminole adults must marry a person outside of the clans of their parents. This rule prevented close relatives from marrying. In keeping with the previous example of children of a marriage between persons of the Raccoon and Alligator clans, if a Raccoon Clan woman married a man of the Raccoon or Alligator clans, it would be as if, in European-American mores, a woman married her brother, or according to age, a daughter married her father.

Historically, many marriages were arranged according to clan strength, or need for renewing life of a declining clan. For example, if the Bear Clan had responsibility to provide hereditary chiefs of a tribal town (atilwa), and there was a shortage of Bear Clan people in the town, its men would be encouraged to take a wife of the Bear Clan in another town. Her children would belong to the Bear Clan in her new town, and the males would be in the hereditary line for chiefs.

== Burial and mourning practices ==
Seminole people respect times of loss. Customarily, the passing of a loved one is observed by official mourning practices for four days. During this time, the family of the deceased carries out the final steps of the funeral. Modern Seminole people ensure that a loved one is buried within the four days after death. The time of mourning encompasses several customs and family traditions, which are carried out with the help of family and close friends, who provide support to the mourners through ritual activities. Many of the customs include times of fasting, participation in overnight vigils, and cooking, cleaning, and other activities.

The body of the deceased is customarily buried with his or her feet toward the East. Prior to Removal, in Florida, the Seminole buried their dead beneath the floor of the family's dwelling. In modern times in Oklahoma, the deceased are often buried in family cemeteries, where a small house is erected over the top of the grave. This house is sometimes referred to as a poyvfekcv-cuko (spirit house). In the house, the family and mourners place objects of meaning to the deceased, along with food set aside from the traditional meal prepared following the funeral services.

== Notable Oklahoma Seminoles ==
- Fred Beaver (1911–1980), easel painter, muralist
- Thomas Coker, long-serving member of Seminole General Council
- John Chupco (d. 1881), chief during the Trail of Tears
- John Frippo Brown, last elected Principal Chief before allotment, dissolution of government, and statehood
- Alice Brown Davis (1852–1935), appointed in 1922 by President Warren G. Harding as Principal Chief, first woman in that position
- Enoch Kelly Haney, politician and artist
- Benjamin Harjo, Jr., painter, printmaker, and youth advocate
- Edmond Harjo, last surviving Seminole Code Talker of World War II and 2013 recipient of the Congressional Gold Medal
- Sterlin Harjo, filmmaker
- Micanopy, principal chief through Removal until his death in 1849 in Indian Territory
- Johnny Tiger Jr., artist
- Mary Jo Watson, art historian, curator, educator
