= John Chupco =

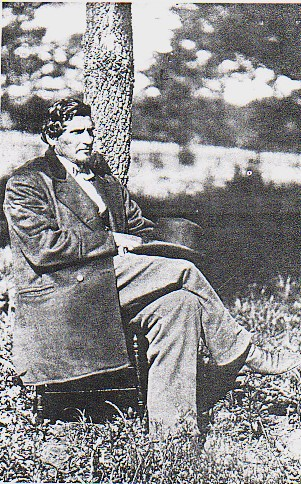
- Born: c. 1821; Spanish Florida or Florida Territory
- Died: February 17, 1881; Seminole Nation of Oklahoma
- Citizenship: Seminole
- Occupations: chief, sergeant, farmer, rancher
- Organization: Hvteyievlke Band
- Height: 2.0066 m (6 ft 7 in)

John Chupco (ca. 1821–1881) was a leader of the Hvteyievlke, or Newcomer, Band of the Seminole during the time of their forced relocation to Indian Territory. They were the last group to move from Florida to Indian Territory.

From 1861 to 1866, Chupco served as chief of the Seminole who supported the Union; they removed to Kansas for safety. There was great bitterness when the tribe divided over their loyalties during the war, with many supporting the Confederacy. Afterward Chupco and his band returned to Indian Territory, working to rebuild the tribe.

== Early life and education ==
John Chupco was born into a Seminole family in Florida. He grew up in traditional ways.

== Career ==
By the time of the Seminole forced relocation, Chupco was chief of the Hvteyievlke Band, which he led from Florida to Indian Territory under Indian Removal.

In 1861 when the American Civil War began, Chupco served as town chief. He refused to sign a treaty between the Seminole and the Confederate States of America. The Seminole leadership and members split over their alliances in the war, as did the Cherokee.

Chupco's tribal town followed Opothleyahola, the Muscogee Creek leader loyal to the Union, and they relocated to Kansas for safety. There Chupco enlisted in the Union Army and ultimately became a first sergeant in Company F, First Regiment, Indian Home Guard. From 1861 to 1866, Chupco served as chief of the Seminole who supported the Union.

After the war, he served as a Southern Treaty Commission Delegate. John Jumper led the Seminoles who had been allied with the Confederacy. Because of that group's alliance with the Confederacy, the United States insisted that the Seminole tribe had to sign a new treaty after the war. The split between these Seminole groups lasted until 1872, at which time the majority of the tribe elected Jumper as chief.

During Reconstruction, Chupco encouraged his tribe to rebuild their nation. In 1869, he joined the Presbyterian Church congregation in Wewoka, Oklahoma. He became a farmer and rancher. He resisted the creation of Oklahoma Territory, as he was concerned that opening up the area to European-American settlement would damage the future of the Seminole.

== Death ==
John Chupco died on February 17, 1881, in the Seminole Nation.

== See also ==
- Four Mothers Society
