= Green Corn Rebellion =

1917 uprising in rural Oklahoma during WWI

- Part of the American Theater of World War I and the Revolutions of 1917–1923
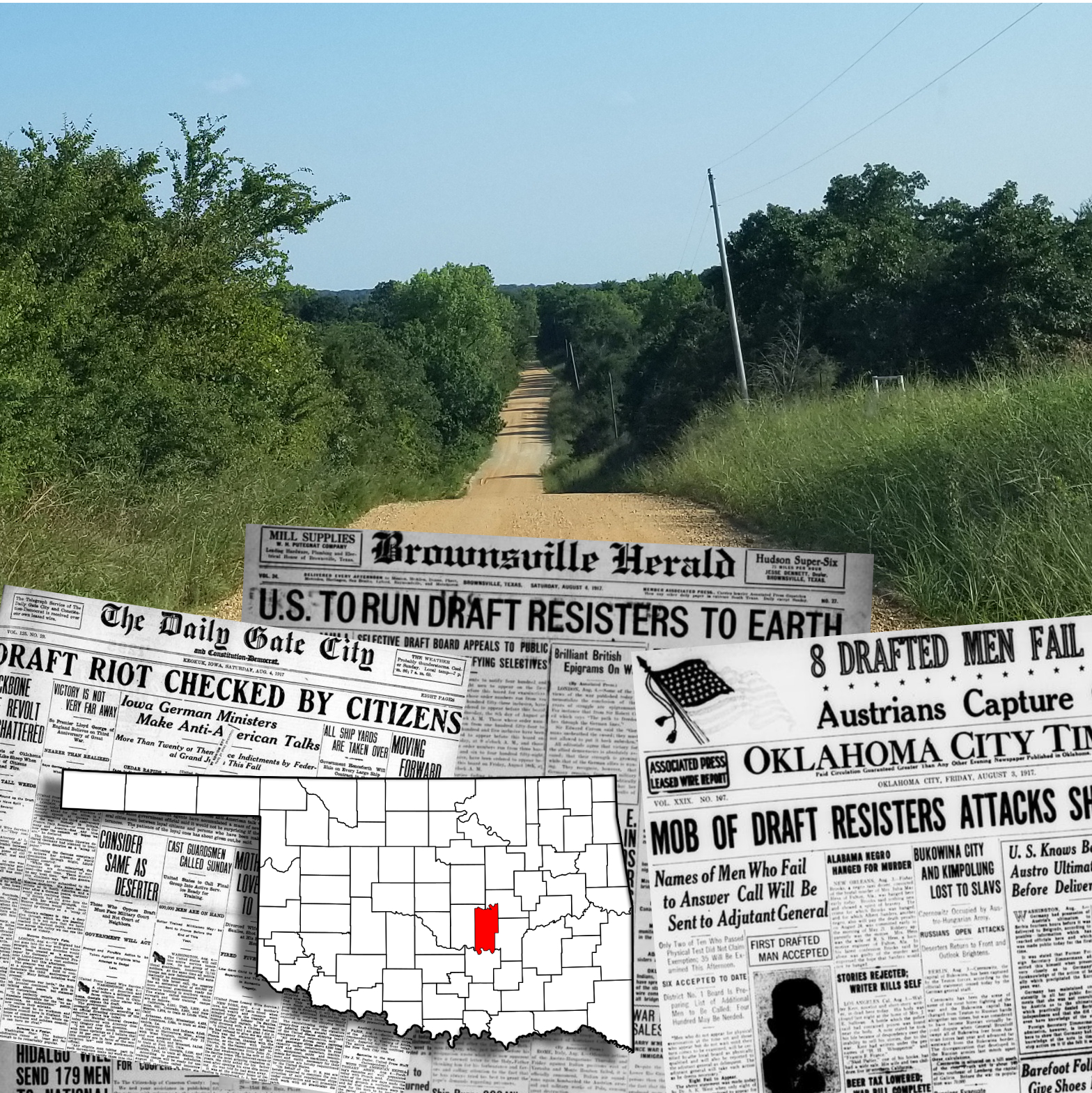
- The Green Corn Rebellion was centered in rural Seminole County in southeastern Oklahoma.
| Date | August 2–3, 1917 |
| Location | Seminole County, Oklahoma |
| Result | United States government victory: Rebellion contributed to outbreak of First Red Scare |

Belligerents
| Pontotoc Rebels: Working Class Union | United States |

Commanders and leaders
| John Spears | Woodrow Wilson |

Strength
| 800 to 1,000 | |

Casualties and losses
- 3 killed 450 arrested

The Green Corn Rebellion was an armed uprising and insurrection that took place in rural Oklahoma on August 2 and 3, 1917. The name "Green Corn Rebellion" was a reference to the purported plans of the rebels to march across the country and to eat "green corn" on the way for sustenance. They hoped to be joined by thousands of sympathizers, march to Washington, D.C., overthrow the federal government, abolish the draft, and end U.S. involvement in the war. Many of the rebels were aligned with the Socialist Party of America.

Betrayed by an informer in their midst, the country rebels met with a well-armed posse of townsmen. Shots were exchanged and three people killed. In the aftermath of the incident, scores of arrests were made and the Socialist Party of America, which had been strong in the region, was discredited in the public eye for allegedly having attempted to foment revolution. The incident became a pretext for national reprisals against the Industrial Workers of the World and the Socialist Party of America.

== Background ==
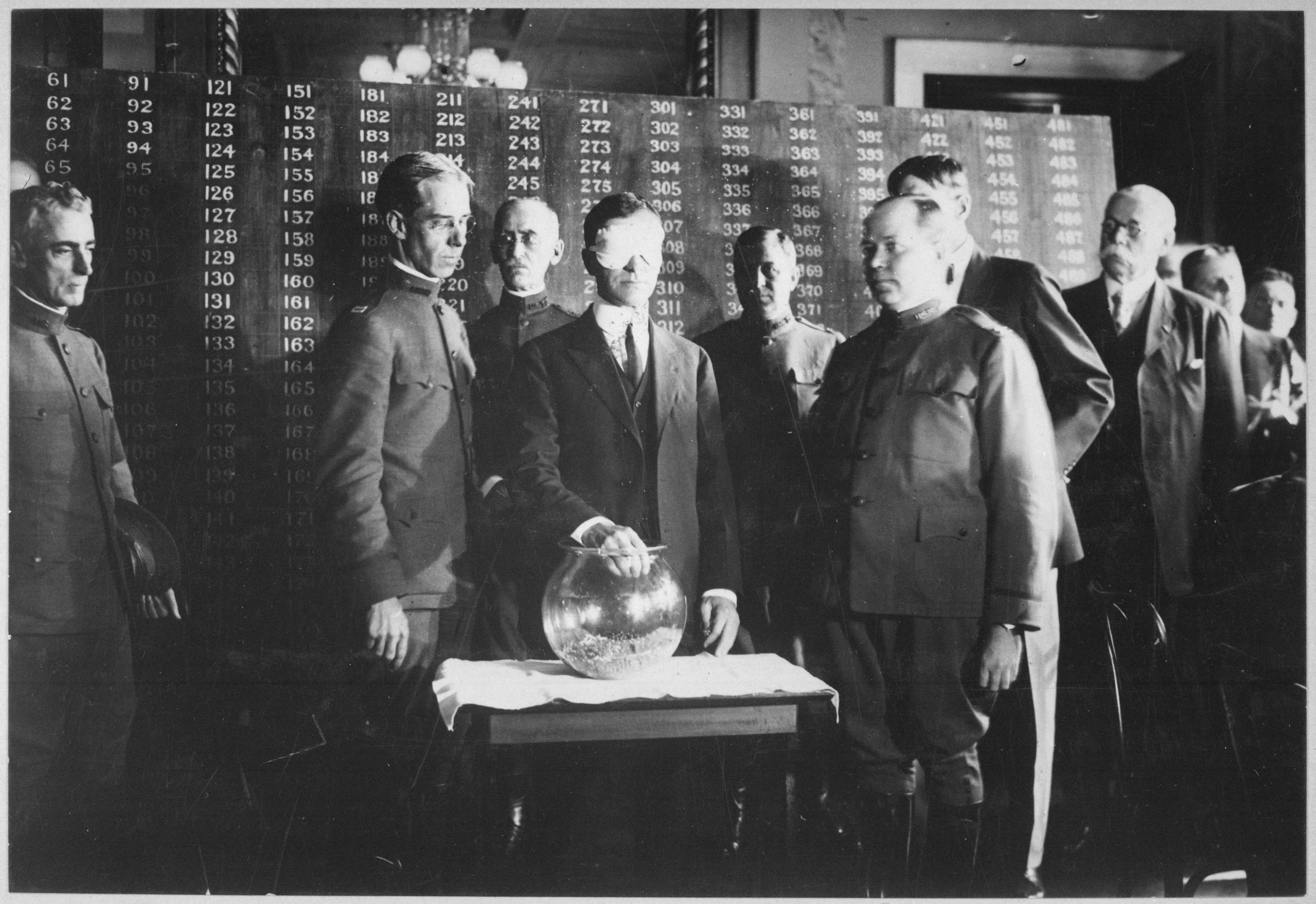
War Secretary Newton Baker draws the first number of the lottery that was created by the Selective Service Act of 1917.

On April 6, 1917, US President Woodrow Wilson, who had recently sworn into a second term of office for which he had run behind the slogan "He Kept Us Out of War," appeared between a joint session of the US Congress to ask for a declaration of war against Imperial Germany. Congress readily obliged Wilson's request by voting to declare war on Germany by a margin of 373–50 in the House of Representatives and 82–6 in the Senate.

The US government's decision to enter World War I was backed up with additional legislation imposing military conscription in America to staff the nation's wartime Army and Navy. On May 18, 1917, a draft bill became law. The bill called for all eligible young men nationwide to register for the draft on a single day, June 5, 1917. Isolated hotspots of anti-conscription activity occurred in some urban centers, but the registration process was generally an orderly affair, with the vast majority of young American men accepting their fate with what has been characterized as "a calm resignation."

On July 20, 1917, a blindfolded Newton D. Baker, the Wilson administration's Secretary of War, drew numbers choosing certain registered young men for mandatory military service. Opponents of the war continued their efforts to change America's course by holding meetings and distributing pamphlets. Among the leading organized forces in opposition to conscription and the war was the Socialist Party of America, whose April 1917 National Convention had declared its "unalterable opposition" to the war and urged the workers of the world to "refuse support to the governments in their wars."

== Situation in Oklahoma ==
Although it was a young state and had been admitted into the union only in November 1907, there was already a strong radical tradition in Oklahoma, whose impoverished tenant farmers of its southeast seized upon the millenarian fervor of the early Socialist Party in an attempt to improve their lives.

In the 1916 election, despite Wilson's siphoning a portion of the anti war vote for the Democratic ticket, the Socialist Party garnered more than a quarter of the votes cast in the 1916 election in Seminole County and 22% in neighboring Pontotoc County.

The Socialist Party was not the only active organizers in the area since in 1916, a radical tenant farmers' organization, the "Working Class Union (WCU)," claimed a membership of as much as 20,000 in Eastern Oklahoma alone. The group's ideology blended what one historian has called "a muddled industrial unionism with traditional southern forms of countervigilantism, self-defense, and opposition to conscription" and arose as a complement to the radical syndicalism of the Industrial Workers of the World, an organization that barred membership by tenant farmers.

Tenant farmers were predominantly young, the age group that was most impacted by conscription. Some 76% of Oklahoma farmers under 24 rented their land, and 45% of those between 25 and 33 were tenants. Most tenant farmers were white or black. Many of the young "dirt farmers" found their economic prospects hopeless since they were squeezed between a usurious credit system practiced by stores and substantial crop liens inflicted by landlords. The depleted condition of Oklahoma's land forced the input of twice as much labor as the sharecroppers of Mississippi and Louisiana to generate comparable yields. Disaffection was rife, and proposals for radical solutions found ready ears. The draft would have depleted much needed farm labor, and many farms would have been foreclosed, which would leave women and children destitute. There was no oil boom, little alternative work, and no welfare system.

Despite the WCU's highly-questionable membership claims, ballooning to 35,000 for the whole state of Oklahoma, it had by 1917 clearly established a solid foothold among the tenant farmers of Oklahoma. The organization was not tame and took the form of a secret society, with activities including night riding and the use of physical violence against its opponents.

Hostilities between the radical rural supporters of the WCU and the conservative forces of the towns of the region ran high, with dynamite used against cattle dipping vats late in 1915 in protest of a mandatory use of costly insecticide, which some felt was as lethal to dipped cattle as to the ticks and other parasites that they carried. The controversy was punctuated by a shotgun blast fired through the window of the Pontotoc County Attorney early in 1916. Conservative voices declared the action to be an act of political terrorism, but radicals charged the shot to be a provocation as "part of a concocted plan on the part of the officials and two or three newspapers to wreck the Socialist Party by pulling off a fake attempted assassination."

View of Roasting Ear Ridge (left side of the road) from south of the intersection of EW 1390 and NS 3630, facing South. North of Sasakwa, Seminole County, Oklahoma, August 4, 2017

Town dwellers, who had been subject to perennial attacks as "robbers, thieves, and grafters" by radical public speakers, were thoroughly convinced that the Socialists and the secret WCU were part of a single radical conspiracy to launch a long-desired revolution in their own locale.

The Muscogee Creek Nation during the rebellion was controlled by only 61 mixed blood Creek and intermarried white individuals. August 3 marked the end of the Muscogee Creek Green Corn Ceremony.

In early August 1917, before the rebellion, large numbers of African-American, European-American, and Native American men gathered at the farm of Joe and John Spears in Sasakwa, at Roasting Ear Ridge, to plan a march upon Washington, D.C., to end the war.

== Rebellion ==
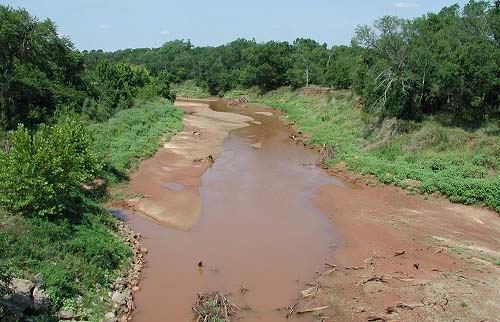
The Little River, near Sasakwa, Oklahoma, the site of an ambush of a Seminole County sheriff and deputy.

The Green Corn Rebellion is said to have started on Thursday, August 2, 1917, when a Seminole County sheriff, Frank Grall, and a visiting deputy sheriff, Bill Cross, were ambushed near the Little River, a tributary of the Canadian River. Raiding parties followed this action, cutting telephone lines and burning railroad bridges.

On Friday, August 3, exactly two weeks after the draft lottery in Washington, DC, an armed gathering assembled near the adjoining borders of Pontotoc, Seminole, and Hughes Counties, in southeastern Oklahoma. The uprising seems to have been spurred by the agitation of the Working Class Union, which was reported in one newspaper as having called its supporters to arms with a manifesto:

Now is the time to rebel against this war with Germany, boys. Boys, get together and don't go. Rich man's war. Poor man's fight. The war is over with Germany if you don't go and J.P. Morgan & Co. is lost. Their great speculation is the only cause of the war.

Unfortunately, no documents written by WCU members have survived, and the mentality of those taking up arms must be considered speculative by historians. The historian Garin Burbank argues that the coming of conscription threatened to decimate family economies by removing able-bodied young men, who were needed to harvest cotton. Burbank argues also that socialist ideas had found its mark in Oklahoma, with many poor farmers earnestly believing from their experiences in daily life in the reality of "exploitation" and accepting the notion that the European war was little more than capitalist business enterprise writ large.

The country people in short saw military conscription as an invasion of their rights and rebelled in an attempt to keep the government from taking away their sons.

Arming themselves, an estimated 800 to 1000 rebels, "the vast majority of old American stock," met on the banks of the South Canadian River and made plans to head east and to live off the land as they marched. They would eat roasted "green corn" and barbecued beef on the way, it was later said, and eventually join up with countless thousands of likeminded comrades, who would together march on Washington, DC, where they would overthrow "Big Slick" Wilson, repeal the Draft Act, and end the war.

The plans were instantly betrayed to local authorities by an informer. A posse of townsmen was formed and headed to the river banks to meet the ostensible revolutionaries. The so-called rebellion proved anticlimactic, as the historian Garin Burbank notes:

Catching sight of the advancing townsmen, the country people fired a few desultory shots and fled in disorder. This was the pathetic end of their overt resistance to the incursions of outside political authority.

The incident was over within a few hours, and mass arrests of participants were begun.

== Aftermath ==
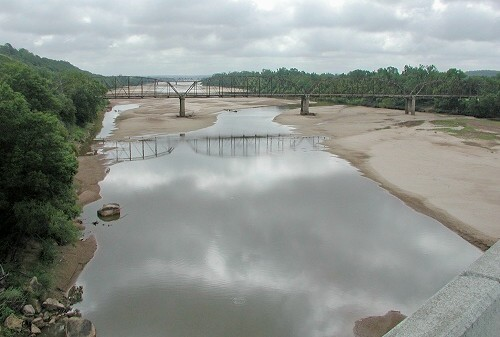
The Canadian River, in southeastern Oklahoma, near the location of the abortive Green Corn Rebellion.

A total of three people were killed in the Green Corn Rebellion in August 1917, one of whom was Clifford Clark, a black tenant farmer. Nearly 450 people were detained in connection with the incident, 266 of whom were released without charges being filed. Charges were levied against 184 participants, about 150 of whom were convicted or pleaded guilty and received jail and prison terms ranging from 60 days to 10 years. Those identified as leaders of the uprising received the heaviest sentences.

Most were soon paroled or pardoned, but five men remained in the federal prison in Leavenworth, Kansas, in February 1922.

The rebellion was used as a cudgel against the Socialist Party of Oklahoma, which was blamed for the incident, whose origins were, however, largely spontaneous and external. That was one in a series of events that undermined the American socialist movement and fueled the First Red Scare.

The Industrial Workers of the World shared the brunt of popular indignation although the organization had taken no part in the Green Corn Rebellion and had been related to the WCU only by the latter group being formed in response to the IWW's refusal to organize tenant farmers.

The IWW was still blamed for every action of the WCU, however, and the bogey Green Corn Rebellion was ultimately used as a justification for further national measures against the IWW.

An elderly Seminole-Muscogee Creek woman relayed to Roxanne Dunbar-Ortiz that her uncle had been imprisoned after the rebellion: "The full moon of late July, early August it was, the Moon of the Green Corn. It was not easy to persuade our poor white and black brothers and sisters to rise up. We told them that rising up, standing up, whatever the consequences, would inspire future generations. Our courage, our bravery would be remembered and copied. That has been the Indian way for centuries, since the invasions. Fight and tell the story so that those who come after or their descendants will rise up once again. It may take a thousand years, but that is how we continue and eventually prevail."

A fictionalized account of the abortive revolt can be found in William Cunningham's novel, The Green Corn Rebellion, which was published by Vanguard Press in 1935. The novel was republished by University of Oklahoma Press in 2010. Sam Marcy, the founder of the Workers' World Party, upheld the Green Corn Rebellion as the ideal working-class antiwar struggle in his book "The Bolsheviks and War," which was published in 1985.

In 2017, the centennial of the Green Corn Rebellion was marked by media coverage and the launch of a website to archive both historical and current interpretations of the event.

== See also ==
- Farmers' Alliance
- Populist movement
- Potlatch Riot of 1913
- San Diego free speech fight
