= Seminole =

Native American people originally from Florida

Este Semvnolvlke (Creek) yat'siminoli (Mikasuki)
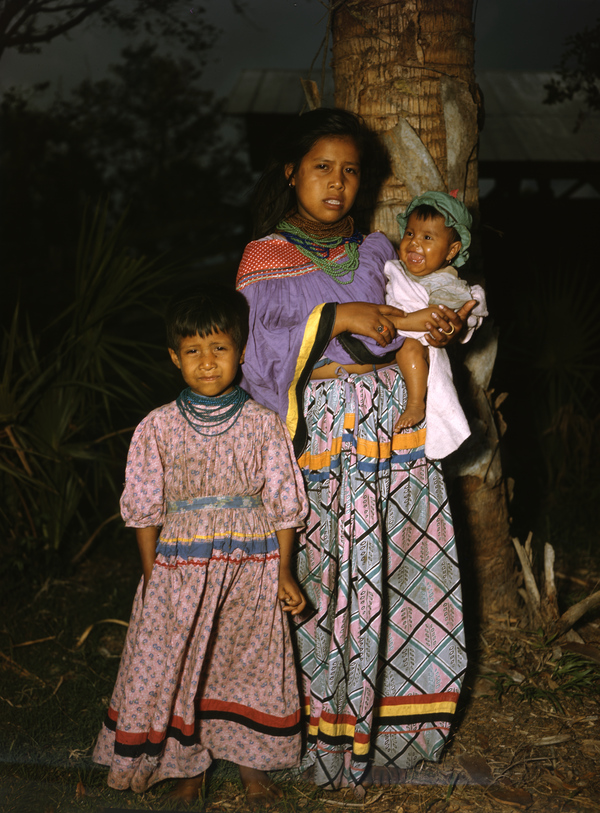
- A Seminole mother and her children from the Brighton Reservation in Florida, 1949

Total population
- est. 18,600; Seminole Nation of Oklahoma; 15,572 enrolled Seminole Tribe of Florida; 4,000 enrolled Miccosukee Tribe of Indians of Florida; 400 enrolled

Regions with significant populations
- United States ( Oklahoma and Florida)

Languages
- Main: English; Cultural: Mikasuki, Muscogee, Afro-Seminole Creole; Historical: Spanish

Religion
- Protestant, Catholic, Green Corn Ceremony

Related ethnic groups
- Ethnic origin: Choctaw, Muscogee, Yamasee, Yuchi, Gullah; Subgroup: Black Seminole, Miccosukee, Mascogos

The Seminole (Creek: Este Semvnolvlke, Mikasuki: yat'siminoli) are a Native American people who developed in Florida in the 18th century. Today, they live in Oklahoma and Florida, and comprise three federally recognized tribes: the Seminole Nation of Oklahoma, the Seminole Tribe of Florida, and the Miccosukee Tribe of Indians of Florida, as well as independent groups. The Seminole people emerged in a process of ethnogenesis from various Native American groups who settled in Spanish Florida beginning in the early 1700s, most significantly northern Muscogee Creeks from what are now Georgia and Alabama.

Old crafts and traditions were revived in both Florida and Oklahoma in the mid-20th century as the Seminole began seeking revenue from tourists traveling along the new interstate highway system. In the 1970s, Seminole tribes began to run small bingo games on their reservations to raise revenue. They won court challenges to initiate Indian gaming on their sovereign land. Many U.S. tribes have likewise adopted this practice where state laws have gambling, in order to generate revenues for welfare, education, and development.

Since the late 20th century, the Seminole Tribe of Florida has been particularly successful with gambling establishments, attracting many of the numerous tourists to the state. In 2007 they purchased the Hard Rock Café and have rebranded or opened several casinos and gaming resorts under that name. These include two large resorts on their Tampa and Hollywood reservations. Together these projects cost more than a billion dollars to construct.

== Etymology ==
According to the Seminole people, the word Seminole is derived from the Muscogee word simanó-li (National Alphabet: Semvnole). This has been variously translated as "frontiersman", "outcast", "runaway", "separatist", and similar words.

The word Seminole is possibly also from the Spanish cimarones, meaning "wild one", "untamed" or "runaway", as opposed to the christianized natives who had previously lived in the mission villages of Spanish Florida. In the 17th century the Spanish in Florida used cimaron or cimarrón to refer to christianized natives who had left their mission villages to live "wild" in the woods. Some of the Hitchiti- or Mikasukee-speakers who had settled in Florida identified themselves to the British as "cimallon" (Muskogean languages have no "r" sound, replacing it with "l").

The British wrote the name as "Semallone", and later Seminole. The use of cimallon by Hitchiti/Mikasukee-speaking bands in Florida to describe themselves may have been intended to distinguish themselves from the primarily Muskogee-speakers of the Upper Towns of the Muscogee Confederacy, called the "Creek Confederacy" by the British. After 1763, when they took over Florida from the Spanish, the British called all natives living in Florida "Seminoles", "Creeks", or "Seminole-Creeks".

== Culture ==
A group of Seminole people dancing around a fire in 1928

The people who constituted the nucleus of this Florida group either chose to leave their tribe or were banished. At one time, the terms "renegade" and "outcast" were used to describe this status, but the terms have fallen into disuse due to their negative connotations. The Seminole identify as yat'siminoli or "free people" because for centuries their ancestors had successfully resisted efforts to subdue or convert them to Roman Catholicism. They signed several treaties with the U.S. government, including the Treaty of Moultrie Creek and the Treaty of Paynes Landing.

Seminole culture is largely derived from that of the Creek. One of the more significant holdovers from the Creek was the Green Corn Dance ceremony. Other notable traditions include use of the black drink and ritual tobacco. As the Seminoles adapted to Florida environs, they developed local traditions, such as the construction of open-air, thatched-roof houses known as chickees. Historically the Seminoles spoke Mikasuki and Creek, both Muskogean languages.

== History ==
=== Origins ===
Florida was the home of several Indigenous cultures prior to the arrival of European explorers in the early 1500s. The introduction of Eurasian infectious diseases, along with conflict with Spanish colonists, led to a drastic decline of Florida's original native population. By the early 1700s, much of La Florida was uninhabited apart from Spanish colonial towns at St. Augustine and Pensacola. A stream of mainly Muscogee Creek began moving into the territory at that time to escape conflict with English colonists to the north and established their own towns, mainly in the Florida panhandle.

Native American refugees from northern wars, such as the Yuchi and Yamasee after the Yamasee War in South Carolina, migrated into Spanish Florida in the early 18th century. The Yuchi did not speak a Muskogean language (the Mikasuki language is Muskogean), but shared the culture of the Muscogee people (called "Creeks" by the English). They had belonged to the Muscogee Creek Confederacy before moving to Florida. More arrived in the second half of the 18th century, as the Lower Creeks, part of the Muscogee people, such as Chief Billy Emathla fled from several of their towns into Florida to evade the dominance of the Upper Creeks and pressure from encroaching colonists from the Province of Carolina. In 1818 chief Billy Emathla was identified as the chief of a Yuchi town of about 75 people associated with Mikasuki villages east of Tallahassee.

They spoke primarily Hitchiti, of which Mikasuki is a dialect. This is the primary traditional language spoken today by the Miccosukee in Florida. Joining them were several bands of Choctaw, many of whom were native to western Florida. Some Chickasaw had also left Georgia due to conflicts with colonists and their Native American allies. Also fleeing to Florida were African Americans who had escaped from slavery in the Southern Colonies.

The new arrivals moved into virtually uninhabited lands that had once been peopled by several cultures indigenous to Florida, such as the Apalachee, Timucua, Calusa and others. The native population had been devastated by infectious diseases brought by Spanish explorers in the 1500s and later colonization by additional European settlers. Later, raids by Carolina and Native American slavers destroyed the string of Spanish missions across northern Florida. Most of the survivors left for Cuba when the Spanish withdrew, after ceding Florida to the British in 1763, following Britain's victory in the French and Indian War.

John Swanton stated in the mid-20th century that the Seminole encountered and absorbed the Calusa who had remained in southwest Florida after the Spanish withdrew. More recent scholarship since the turn of the 21st century holds that there is no documentary evidence of that assertion.

=== 1700s to early 1800s ===
As they established themselves in northern and peninsular Florida throughout the 1700s, the various new arrivals intermingled with each other and with the few remaining Indigenous people. In a process of ethnogenesis, they constructed a new culture which they called "Seminole", a derivative of the Mvskoke' (a Creek language) word simano-li, an adaptation of the Spanish cimarrón which means "wild" (in their case, "wild men"), or "runaway" [men]. The Seminole were a heterogeneous tribe made up of mostly Lower Creeks from Georgia, who by the time of the Creek War (1813–1814) numbered about 4,000 in Florida. At that time, numerous refugees of the Red Sticks migrated south, adding about 2,000 people to the population. They were Creek-speaking Muscogee, and were the ancestors of most of the later Creek-speaking Seminole.

A few hundred escaped African-American slaves (known as the Black Seminoles) settled near the Seminole towns and, to a lesser extent, Native Americans from other tribes, and some white Americans. The unified Seminole spoke two languages: Creek and Mikasuki (mutually intelligible with its dialect Hitchiti), two among the Muskogean languages family. Creek became the dominant language for political and social discourse, so Mikasuki speakers learned it if participating in high-level negotiations. The Muskogean language group includes Choctaw and Chickasaw, associated with two other major Southeastern tribes.

In part due to the arrival of Native Americans from other cultures, the Seminole became increasingly independent of other Creek groups and established their own identity through ethnogenesis. They developed a thriving trade network by the time of the British and second Spanish periods, roughly 1767–1821. The tribe expanded considerably during this time, and was further supplemented from the late 18th century by escaped slaves from Southern plantations who settled near and paid tribute to Seminole towns. The latter became known as Black Seminoles, although they kept many facets of their own Gullah culture.

During the colonial years, the Seminole were on relatively good terms with both the Spanish and the British. In 1784, after the American Revolutionary War, Britain came to a settlement with Spain and transferred East and West Florida to it.

The Spanish Empire's decline enabled the Seminole to settle more deeply into Florida. They were led by a dynasty of chiefs of the Alachua chiefdom, founded in eastern Florida in the 18th century by Cowkeeper. Beginning in 1825, Micanopy was the principal chief of the unified Seminole, until his death in 1849, after removal to Indian Territory. This chiefly dynasty lasted past Removal, when the US forced the majority of Seminole to move from Florida to the Indian Territory, in modern Oklahoma, after the Second Seminole War. Micanopy's sister's son, John Jumper, succeeded him in 1849 and, after his death in 1853, his brother Jim Jumper became principal chief. He was in power through the American Civil War, after which the U.S. government began to interfere with tribal government, supporting its own candidate for chief.

After raids by Anglo-American colonists on Seminole settlements in the mid-18th century, the Seminole retaliated by raiding the Southern Colonies, primarily Georgia, purportedly at the behest of the Spanish. The Seminoles also maintained a tradition of accepting escaped slaves from Southern plantations, infuriating planters in the American South by providing a route for their slaves to escape bondage.

After the United States achieved independence, the U.S. Army and local militia groups made increasingly frequent incursions into Spanish Florida to recapture escaped slaves living among the Seminole. American general Andrew Jackson's 1817–1818 campaign against the Seminoles became known as the First Seminole War. Though Spain decried the incursions into its territory, the United States effectively controlled the Florida panhandle after the war.

=== Seminole Wars ===
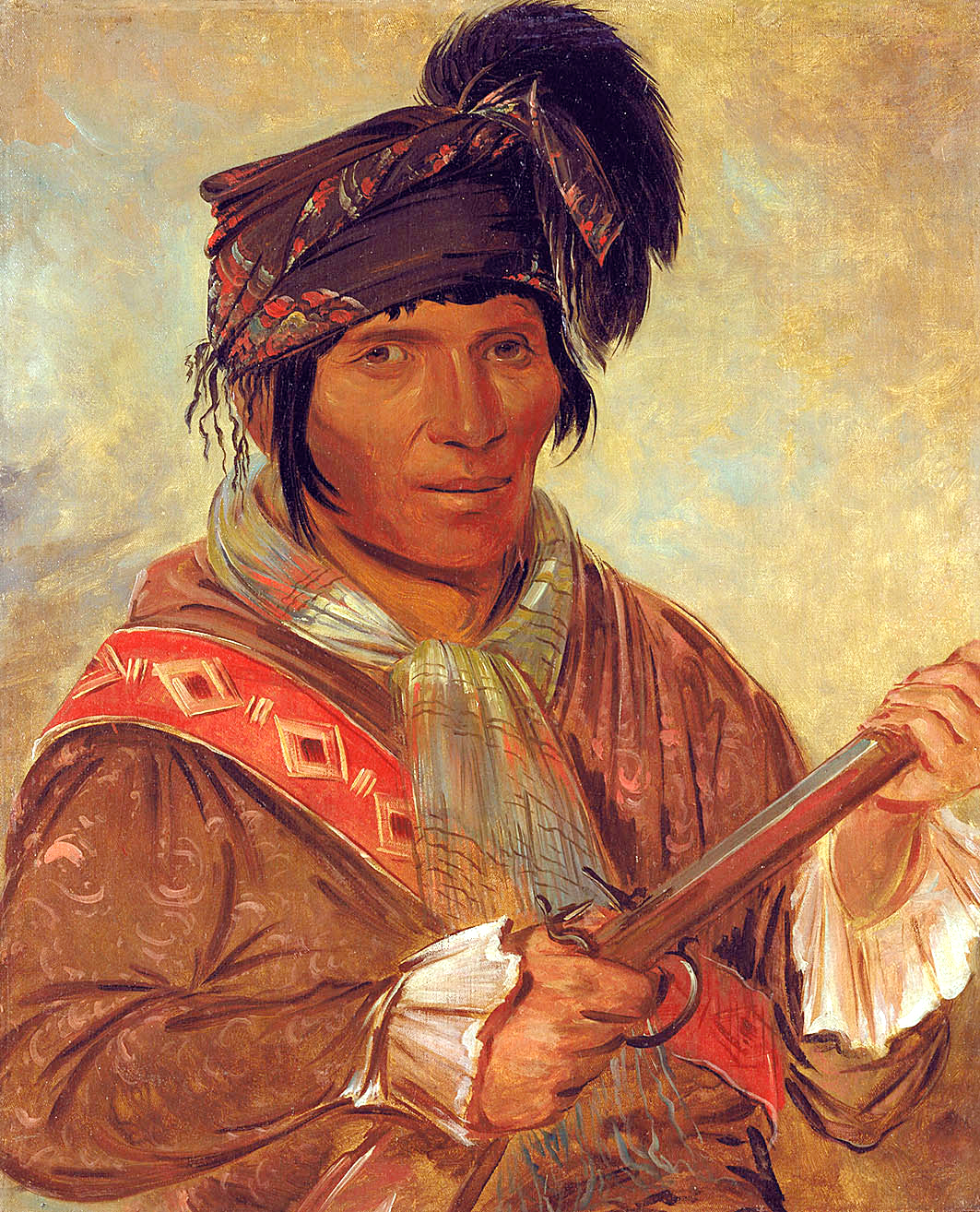
Coeehajo, Chief, 1837, Smithsonian American Art Museum

In 1819, the United States and Spain signed the Adams-Onís Treaty, which took effect in 1821. According to its terms, the United States acquired Florida and, in exchange, renounced all claims to Texas. President James Monroe appointed Andrew Jackson as military governor of Florida. As European American colonization increased after the treaty, colonists pressured the federal government to remove Natives from Florida. Slaveholders resented that tribes harbored runaway black slaves, and more colonists wanted access to desirable lands held by Native Americans. Georgian slaveholders wanted the "maroons" and fugitive slaves living among the Seminoles, known today as Black Seminoles, returned to slavery.

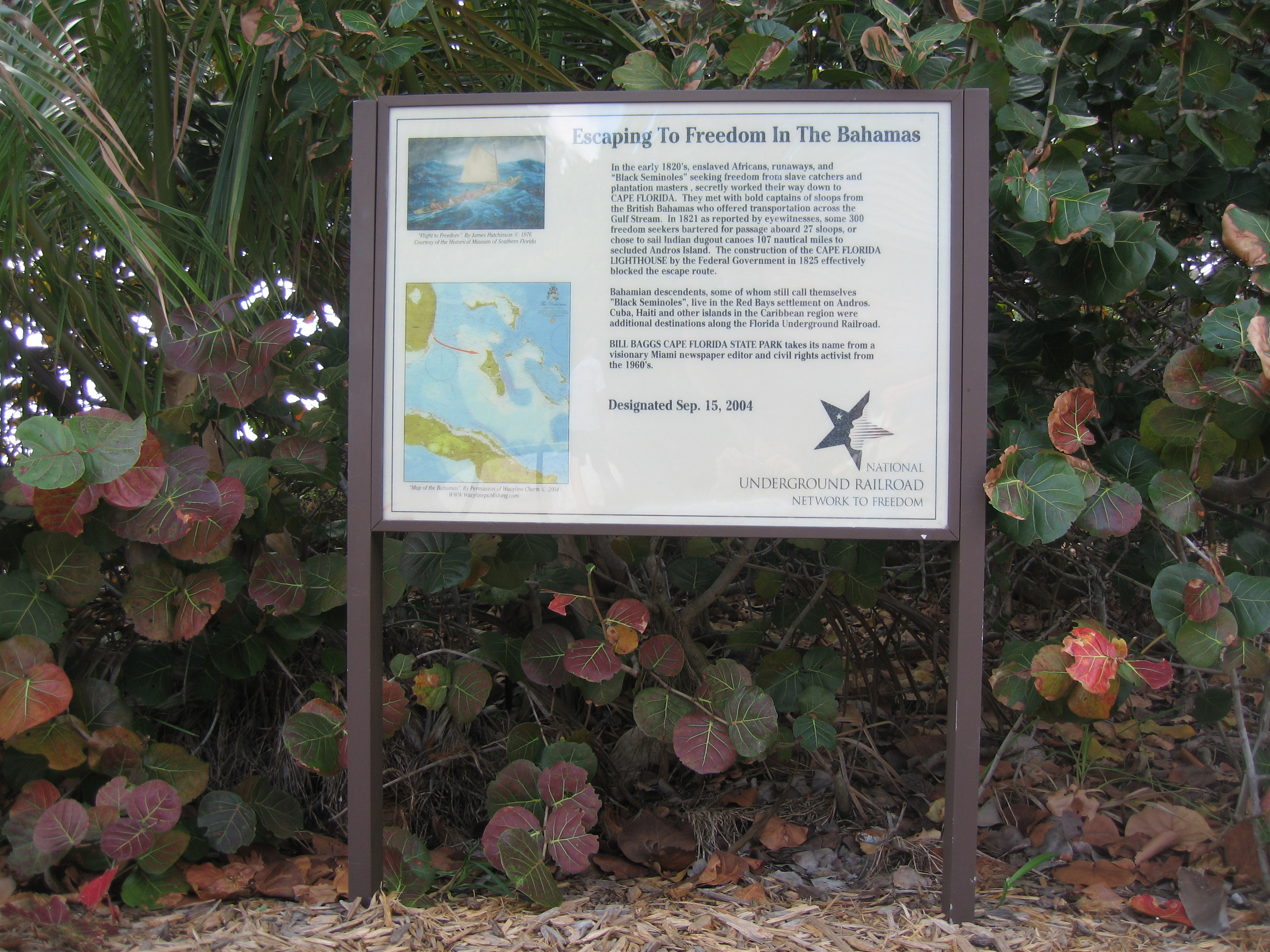
A sign at Bill Baggs Cape Florida State Park commemorating hundreds of enslaved African Americans who in the early 1820s escaped from this area with the help of British boat captains to freedom in the Bahamas.

After acquisition by the U.S. of Florida in 1821, many American slaves and Black Seminoles frequently escaped from Cape Florida to the British colony of the Bahamas, settling mostly on Andros Island. Contemporary accounts noted a group of 120 migrating in 1821, and a much larger group of 300 enslaved African Americans escaping in 1823. The latter were picked up by Bahamians in 27 sloops and also by travelers in canoes. They developed a village known as Red Bays on Andros.

Under colonists' pressure, the U.S. government made the 1823 Treaty of Camp Moultrie with the Seminoles, seizing 24 million acres in northern Florida. They offered the Seminoles a much smaller reservation in the Everglades, of about 100,000-acre (400 km^{2}). They and the Black Seminoles moved into central and southern Florida.

In 1832, the U.S. government signed the Treaty of Payne's Landing with a few of the Seminole chiefs. They promised lands west of the Mississippi River if the chiefs agreed to leave Florida voluntarily with their people. The Seminoles who remained prepared for war. White colonists continued to press for their removal.

In 1835, the U.S. Army arrived to enforce the treaty. The Seminole leader Osceola led the vastly outnumbered resistance during the Second Seminole War. Drawing on a population of about 4,000 Seminoles and 800 allied Black Seminoles, he mustered at most 1,400 warriors (President Andrew Jackson estimated they had only 900). They countered combined U.S. Army and militia forces that ranged from 6,000 troops at the outset to 9,000 at the peak of deployment in 1837.

To survive, the Seminole allies employed guerrilla tactics with devastating effect against U.S. forces, as they knew how to move within the Everglades and use this area for their protection. Osceola was arrested, in a breach of honor, when he came under a flag of truce to negotiations with the US in 1837. He died in jail less than a year later. He was decapitated, his body buried without his head.Lakeland News

Other war chiefs, such as Halleck Tustenuggee and John Jumper, and the Black Seminoles Abraham and John Horse, continued the Seminole resistance against the army. After a full decade of fighting, the war ended in 1842. Scholars estimate the U.S. government spent about $40,000,000 on the war, at the time a huge sum. An estimated 3,000 Seminoles and 800 Black Seminoles were forcibly exiled to Indian Territory west of the Mississippi, where they were settled on the Creek reservation. After later skirmishes in the Third Seminole War (1855–1858), perhaps 200 survivors retreated deep into the Everglades to land that was not desired by settlers. They were finally left alone and they never surrendered.

Several treaties seem to bear the mark of representatives of the Seminole tribe, including the Treaty of Moultrie Creek and the Treaty of Payne's Landing. The Florida Seminoles say they are the only tribe in America never to have signed a peace treaty with the U.S. government.

== American Civil War ==
During the American Civil War, the Confederate government of Florida offered aid to keep the Seminoles from fighting on the side of the Union. The Florida House of Representatives established a Committee on Indian Affairs in 1862 but, aside from appointing a representative to negotiate with the Seminole tribe, failed to follow its promises of aid. The lack of aid, along with the growing number of Federal troops and pro-unionists in the state, led the Seminoles to remain officially neutral throughout the war.

In July 1864, Secretary of War James A. Seddon received word that a man named A. McBride had raised a company of sixty-five Seminole who had volunteered to fight for the Confederacy. McBride claimed to have an understanding of Florida because of the time he had spent there fighting during the Seminole wars. While McBride never put such a company in the field, this letter shows how the Confederacy attempted to use Seminole warriors against the Union.

Other leaders, such as Halleck Tustenuggee and Sonuk Mikko (Billy Bowlegs), refused to sign, withdrew from Florida, and joined with the Union.

After the war, the United States government declared void all prior treaties with the Seminoles of Indian Country because of the "disloyalty" of some in allying with the Confederacy. They required new peace treaties, establishing such conditions as reducing the power of tribal councils, providing freedom or tribal membership for Black Seminoles (at the same time that enslaved African Americans were being emancipated in the South), and forced concessions of tribal land for railroads and other development.

=== Post-Seminole Wars and the 20th century ===
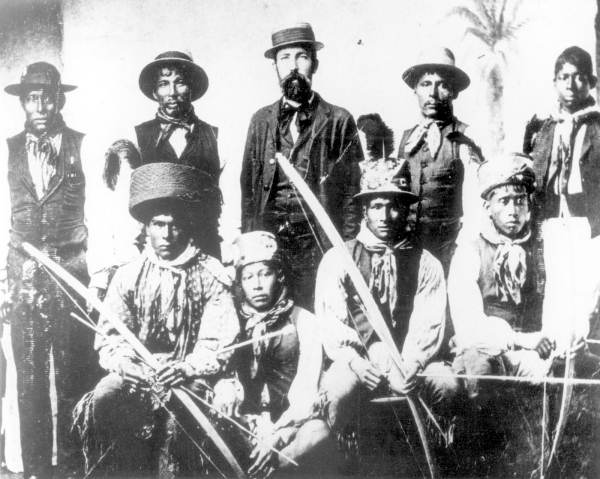
Captain Francis Asbury Hendry (center, standing) poses with a group of Seminole Indians

The 1868 Florida Constitution, developed by the Reconstruction legislature, gave the Seminoles one seat in the house and one seat in the senate of the state legislature. The Seminoles never filled the positions. After white Democrats regained control over the legislature, they removed this provision from the post-Reconstruction constitution they ratified in 1885. In the early 20th century, the Florida Seminoles re-established limited relations with the U.S. government. The Seminoles maintained a thriving trade business with white merchants during this period, selling alligator hides, bird plumes, and other items sourced from the Everglades.

In 1906, Governor Napoleon B. Broward began an effort to drain the Everglades in attempt to convert the wetlands into farmland. The plan to drain the Everglades, new federal and state laws ending the plume trade, and the start of World War I, which put a halt to international fashion trade, all contributed to a major decline in the demand for Seminole goods.

In 1930, they received 5,000 acres (20 km^{2}) of reservation lands. Few Seminoles moved to these reservations until the 1940s. They reorganized their government and received federal recognition in 1957 as the Seminole Tribe of Florida. During this process, the more traditional people near the Tamiami Trail defined themselves as independent. They received federal recognition as the Miccosukee Tribe of Indians in Florida in 1962.

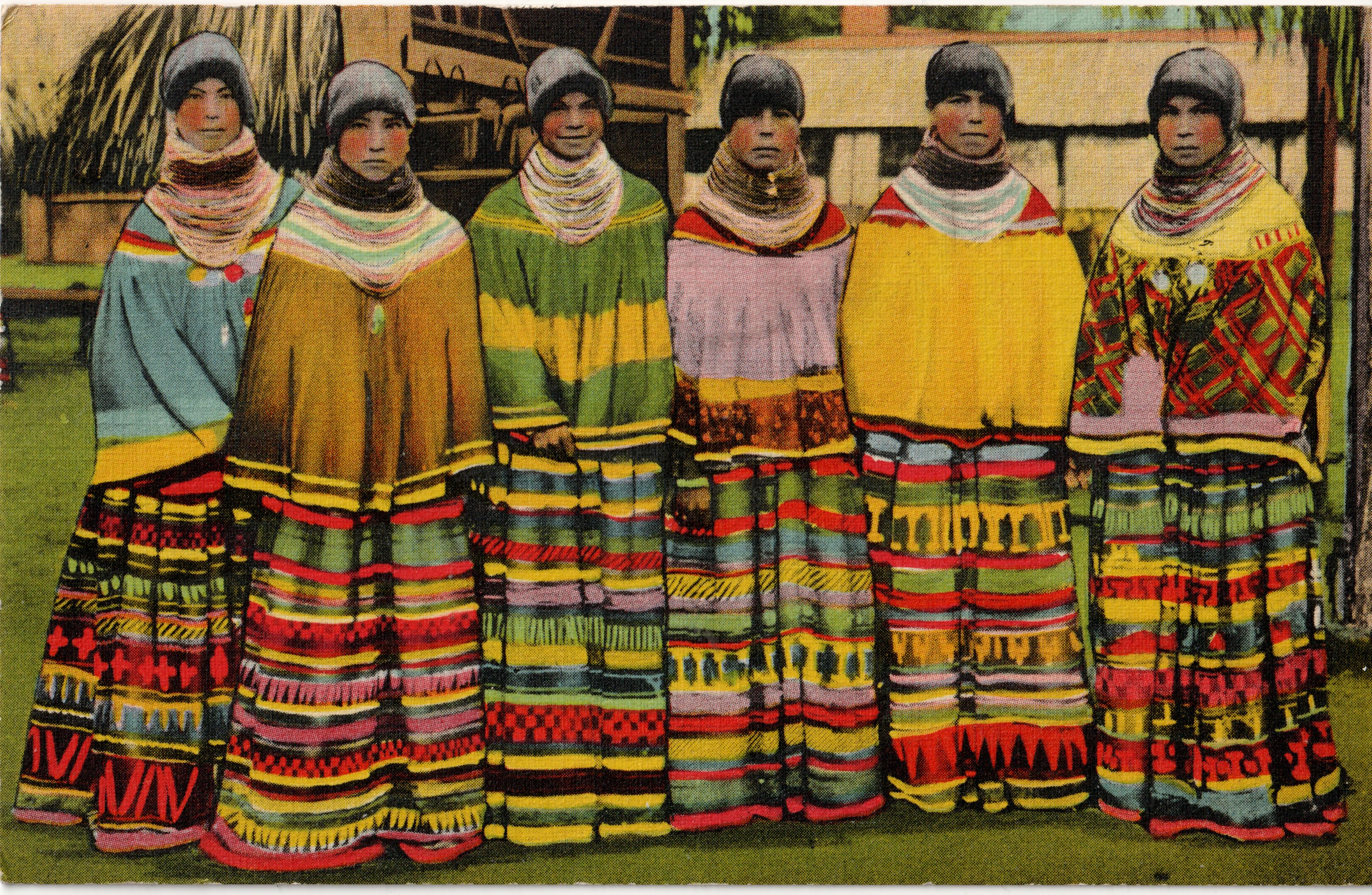
A group of Seminole women in approximately the 1930s

During World War II, roughly sixty-five Seminoles fled into the Everglades to avoid registering for the draft. The superintendent of the Seminole Indian agency in Dania was able to convince all but two of the group to eventually register.

In the 1950s, the Oklahoma and Florida Seminole tribes filed land claim suits, claiming they had not received adequate compensation for their lands. Their suits were combined in the government's settlement of 1976. The Seminole tribes and Traditionals took until 1990 to negotiate an agreement as to division of the settlement, a judgment trust against which members can draw for education and other benefits. The Florida Seminoles founded a high-stakes bingo game on their reservation in the late 1970s, winning court challenges to initiate Native American gaming, which many tribes have adopted to generate revenues for welfare, education, and development.

After removal, the Seminoles in Oklahoma and Florida had little official contact until well into the 20th century. They developed along similar lines as the groups strove to maintain their culture while struggling economically. Most Seminoles in Indian Territory lived on tribal lands centered in what is now Seminole County of the state of Oklahoma. The implementation of the Dawes Rolls in the late 1890s parceled out tribal lands in preparation for the admission of Oklahoma as a state, reducing most Seminoles to subsistence farming on small individual homesteads. While some tribe members left the territory to seek better opportunities, most remained.

Today, residents of the reservation are enrolled in the federally recognized Seminole Nation of Oklahoma, while others belong to unorganized groups. The Florida Seminole re-established limited relations with the U.S. government in the early 1900s and were officially granted 5,000 acres (20 km^{2}) of reservation land in south Florida in 1930. Members gradually moved to the land, and they reorganized their government and received federal recognition as the Seminole Tribe of Florida in 1957. The more traditional people living near the Tamiami Trail received federal recognition as the Miccosukee Tribe in 1962.

== Political and social organization ==
The Seminoles were organized around itálwa, the basis of their social, political and ritual systems, and roughly equivalent to towns or bands in English. They had a matrilineal kinship system, in which children are considered born into their mother's family and clan, and property and hereditary roles pass through the maternal line. Males held the leading political and social positions. Each itálwa had civil, military and religious leaders. They were self-governing throughout the nineteenth century, but cooperated for mutual defense. The itálwa continued to be the basis of Seminole society in Oklahoma into the 21st century.

== Languages ==
Historically, the various groups of Seminoles spoke two mutually unintelligible Muskogean languages: Mikasuki (and its dialect, Hitchiti) and Muscogee. Mikasuki is now restricted to Florida, where it was the native language of 1,600 people as of 2000, primarily the Miccosukee Tribe of Indians of Florida. The Seminole Nation of Oklahoma is working to revive the use of Creek among its people, as it had been the dominant language of politics and social discourse.

Muscogee is spoken by some Oklahoma Seminoles and about 200 older Florida Seminoles. The youngest native speaker was born in 1960. Today, English is the predominant language among both Oklahoma and Florida Seminoles, particularly the younger generations. Most Mikasuki speakers are bilingual.

== Ethnobotany ==
The Seminole use the spines of Cirsium horridulum (also called bristly thistle) to make blowgun darts.

== Contemporary ==
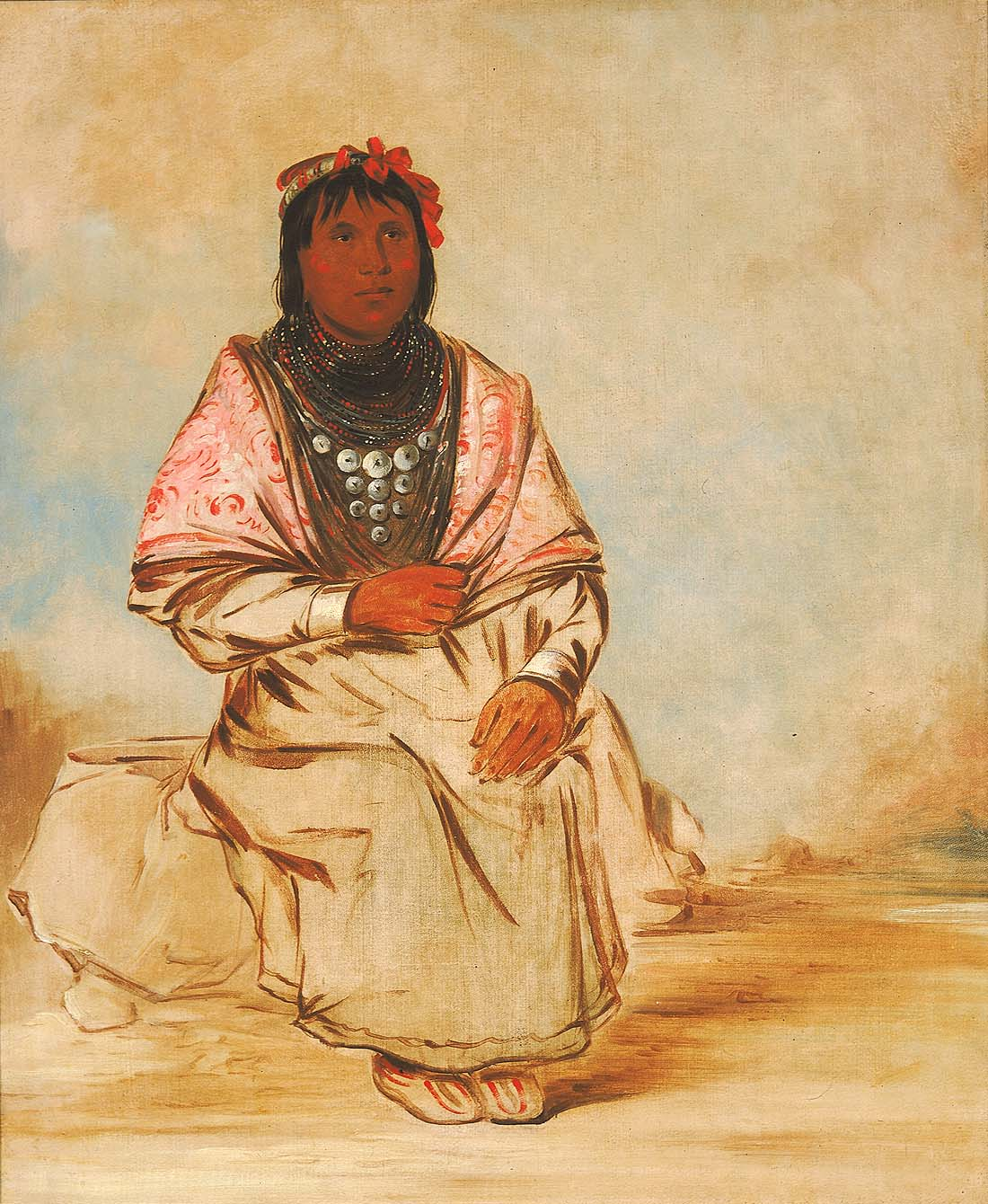
Seminole woman, painted by George Catlin, 1834

During the Seminole Wars, the Seminole people began to divide among themselves due to the conflict and differences in ideology. The Seminole population had also been growing significantly, though it was diminished by the wars. With the division of the Seminole population between Indian Territory (Oklahoma) and Florida, they still maintained some common traditions, such as powwow trails and ceremonies. In general, the cultures grew apart in their markedly different circumstances, and had little contact for a century.

The Seminole Nation of Oklahoma, and the Seminole Tribe of Florida and Miccosukee Tribe of Indians of Florida, described below, are federally recognized, independent nations that operate in their own spheres.

=== Religion ===
Seminole tribes generally follow Christianity, both Protestantism and Catholicism. They also observe their traditional Native religion, which is expressed through the stomp dance and the Green Corn Ceremony held at their ceremonial grounds. Indigenous peoples have practiced Green Corn rituals for centuries. Contemporary southeastern Native American tribes, such as the Seminole and Muscogee Creek, still practice these ceremonies.

As converted Christian Seminoles established their own churches, they incorporated their traditions and beliefs into a syncretic Indigenous-Western practice. For example, Seminole hymns sung in the Indigenous Muscogee language are inclusive of key Muscogee language terms. For example, the Muscogee term "mekko" or chief conflates with "Jesus". Also, hymns are frequently led by a song leader, a traditional Indigenous song practice.

In the 1950s, federal projects in Florida encouraged the tribe's reorganization. They created organizations within tribal governance to promote modernization. As Christian pastors began preaching on reservations, Green Corn Ceremony attendance decreased. This created tension between religiously traditional Seminoles and those who began adopting Christianity. In the 1960s and 1970s, some tribal members on reservations, such as the Brighton Seminole Indian Reservation in Florida, viewed organized Christianity as a threat to their traditions.

By the 1980s, Seminole communities were even more concerned about loss of language and tradition. Many tribal members began to revive the observance of traditional Green Corn Dance ceremonies, and some shifted away from Christian observance. By 2000, religious tension between Green Corn Dance attendees and Christians, particularly Baptists, decreased. Some Seminole families participate in both religions; these practitioners have developed a syncretic Christianity that has absorbed some tribal traditions.

== Land claims ==
In 1946, the Department of Interior established the Indian Claims Commission, to consider compensation for tribes that claimed their lands were seized by the federal government during times of conflict. Tribes seeking settlements had to file claims by August 1961, and both the Oklahoma and Florida Seminoles did so. After combining their claims, the Commission awarded the Seminole a total of $16 million in April 1976. It had established that, at the time of the 1823 Treaty of Moultrie Creek, the Seminole exclusively occupied and used 24 million acres in Florida, which they ceded under the treaty. Assuming that most blacks in Florida were escaped slaves, the United States did not recognize the Black Seminoles as legally members of the tribe, nor as free in Florida under Spanish rule. Although the Black Seminoles also owned or controlled land that was seized in this cession, they were not acknowledged in the treaty.

In 1976, the groups struggled on allocation of funds among the Oklahoma and Florida tribes. Based on early 20th century population records, at which time most of the people were full-blood, the Seminole Tribe of Oklahoma was to receive three-quarters of the judgment and the Florida peoples one-quarter. The Miccosukee and allied Traditionals filed suit against the settlement in 1976 to refuse the money; they did not want to give up their claim for return of lands in Florida.

The federal government put the settlement in trust until the court cases could be decided. The Oklahoma and Florida tribes entered negotiations, which was their first sustained contact in the more than a century since removal. In 1990, the settlement was awarded: three-quarters to the Seminole Tribe of Oklahoma and one-quarter to the Seminoles of Florida, including the Miccosukee. By that time the total settlement was worth $40 million. The tribes have set up judgment trusts, which fund programs to benefit their people, such as education and health.

=== Seminole Nation of Oklahoma ===
As a result of the Second Seminole War (1835–1842), about 3,800 Seminoles and Black Seminoles were forcibly removed to Indian Territory, the modern state of Oklahoma. During the American Civil War, the members and leaders split over their loyalties, with John Chupco refusing to sign a treaty with the Confederacy. From 1861 to 1866, he led as chief of the Seminole who supported the Union and fought in the Indian Brigade.

The split among the Seminoles lasted until 1872. After the war, the United States government negotiated only with the loyal Seminole, requiring the tribe to make a new peace treaty to cover those who allied with the Confederacy, to emancipate the slaves, and to extend tribal citizenship to those Seminole Freedmen who chose to stay in Seminole territory.

The Seminole Nation of Oklahoma now has about 16,000 enrolled members, who are divided into a total of fourteen bands; for the Seminole members, these are similar to tribal clans. The Seminole have a society based on a matrilineal kinship system of descent and inheritance: children are born into their mother's band and derive their status from her people. To the end of the nineteenth century, they spoke mostly Mikasuki and Creek.

Two of the fourteen are "Freedmen Bands," composed of citizens descended from Black Seminoles, who were legally freed by the U.S. and tribal nations after the Civil War. They have a tradition of extended patriarchal families in close communities. While the elite interacted with the Seminoles, most of the Freedmen were involved most closely with other Freedmen. They maintained their own culture, religion and social relationships. At the turn of the 20th century, they still spoke mostly Afro-Seminole Creole, a language developed in Florida related to other African-based Creole languages.

The Nation is ruled by an elected council, with two members from each of the fourteen bands, including the Freedmen's bands. The capital is at Wewoka, Oklahoma.

The Seminole Nation of Oklahoma has had tribal citizenship disputes related to the Seminole Freedmen, both in terms of their sharing in a judgment trust awarded in settlement of a land claim suit, and their membership in the Nation.

=== Florida Seminoles ===
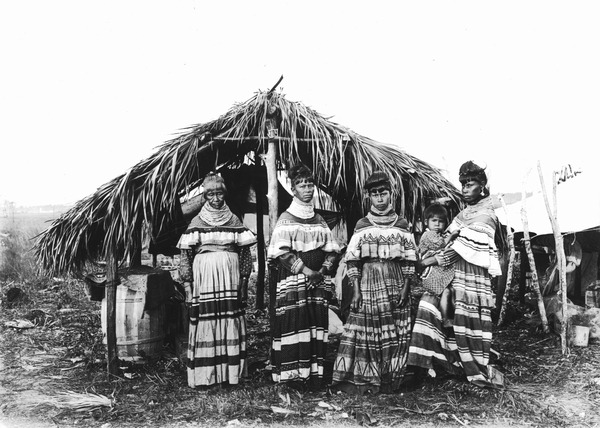
The Seminole family of tribal elder, Cypress Tiger, at their camp near Kendall, Florida, 1916. Photo taken by botanist, John Kunkel Small

The remaining few hundred Seminoles survived in the Florida swamplands, avoiding removal. They lived in the Everglades, to isolate themselves from European Americans. Seminoles continued their distinctive life, such as "clan-based matrilocal residence in scattered thatched-roof chickee camps." Today, the Florida Seminoles proudly note the fact that their ancestors were never conquered.

In the 20th century before World War II, the Seminoles in Florida divided into two groups; those who were more traditional and those willing to adapt to the reservations. Those who accepted reservation lands and made adaptations achieved federal recognition in 1957 as the Seminole Tribe of Florida.

Many of those who had kept to traditional ways and spoke the Mikasuki language organized as the Miccosukee Tribe of Indians of Florida, gaining state recognition in 1957 and federal recognition in 1962. (See also Miccosukee Tribe of Indians of Florida, below.) With federal recognition, they gained reservation lands and worked out a separate arrangement with the state for control of extensive wetlands. Other Seminole not affiliated with either of the federally recognized groups are known as Traditional or Independent Seminole, known formally as the Council of the Original Miccosukee Simanolee Nation Aboriginal People.

At the time the tribes were recognized, in 1957 and 1962, respectively, they entered into agreements with the US government confirming their sovereignty over tribal lands.

==== Seminole Tribe of Florida ====
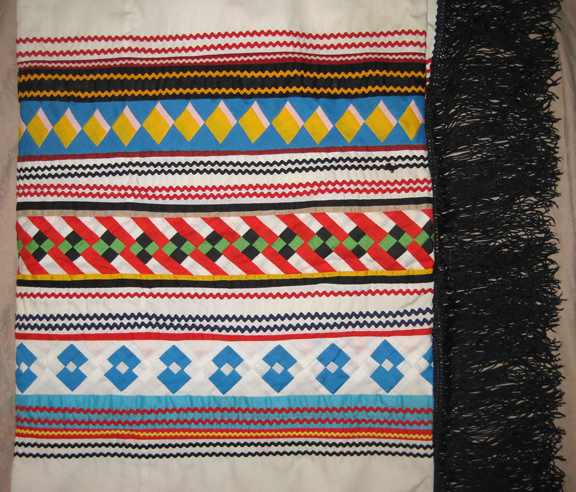
Seminole patchwork shawl made by Susie Cypress from Big Cypress Indian Reservation, ca. 1980s

The Seminoles worked hard to adapt, but they were highly affected by the rapidly changing American environment. Natural disasters magnified changes from the governmental drainage project of the Everglades. Residential, agricultural, and business development changed the "natural, social, political, and economic environment" of the Seminoles. In the 1930s, the Seminoles slowly began to move onto federally designated reservation lands within the region. The U.S. government had purchased lands and put them in trust for Seminole use.

Initially, few Seminoles had any interest in moving to the reservation land or in establishing more formal relations with the government. Some feared that if they moved onto reservations, they would be forced to move to Oklahoma. Others accepted the move in hopes of stability, jobs promised by the Indian New Deal, or as new converts to Christianity.

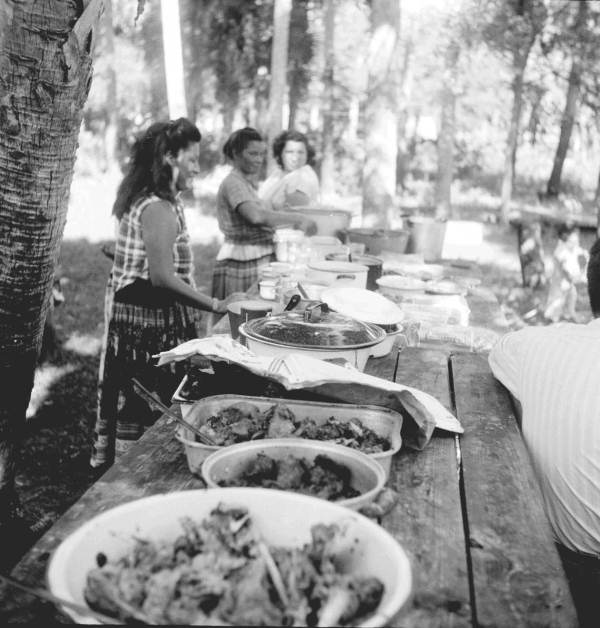
Seminoles' Thanksgiving meal mid-1950s

Beginning in the 1940s, more Seminoles began to move to the reservations. A major catalyst for this was the conversion of many Seminole to Christianity, following missionary effort spearheaded by the Creek Baptist evangelist Stanley Smith. For the new converts, relocating to the reservations afforded them the opportunity to establish their own churches, where they adapted traditions to incorporate into their style of Christianity. Reservation Seminoles began forming tribal governments and forming ties with the Bureau of Indian Affairs.

In 1957, the nation reorganized and established formal relations with the U.S. government as the Seminole Tribe of Florida. The Seminole Tribe of Florida is headquartered in Hollywood, Florida. They control several reservations: Big Cypress, Brighton Reservation, Fort Pierce Reservation, Hollywood Reservation, Immokalee Reservation, and Tampa Reservation.

==== Miccosukee Tribe of Indians of Florida ====
A traditional group who became known as the Trail Indians moved their camps closer to the Tamiami Trail connecting Tampa and Miami, where they could sell crafts to travelers. They felt disfranchised by the move of the Seminoles to reservations, who they felt were adopting too many European American ways. Their differences were exacerbated in 1950 when some reservation Seminoles filed a land claim suit against the federal government for seizure of lands in the 19th century, an action that the Trail Indians did not support.

Following federal recognition of the Seminole Tribe of Florida in 1957, the Trail Indians decided to organize a separate government. They sought recognition as the Miccosukee Tribe, as they spoke the Mikasuki language. It was not intelligible to Creek speakers, but some members of each group were bilingual in the two languages, especially as the Creek-speaking Seminole were more numerous.

The Miccosukee Tribe of Indians of Florida received federal recognition in 1962. The federal government assigned them their own reservation lands, collectively known as the Miccosukee Indian Reservation. The Miccosukee Tribe set up a 333-acre (1.35 km^{2}) reservation on the northern border of Everglades National Park, about 45 miles (72 km) west of Miami.

== Commerce ==
In the United States 2000 census, 12,431 people self-reported as Seminole American. An additional 15,000 people identified as Seminole in combination with some other tribal affiliation or race.

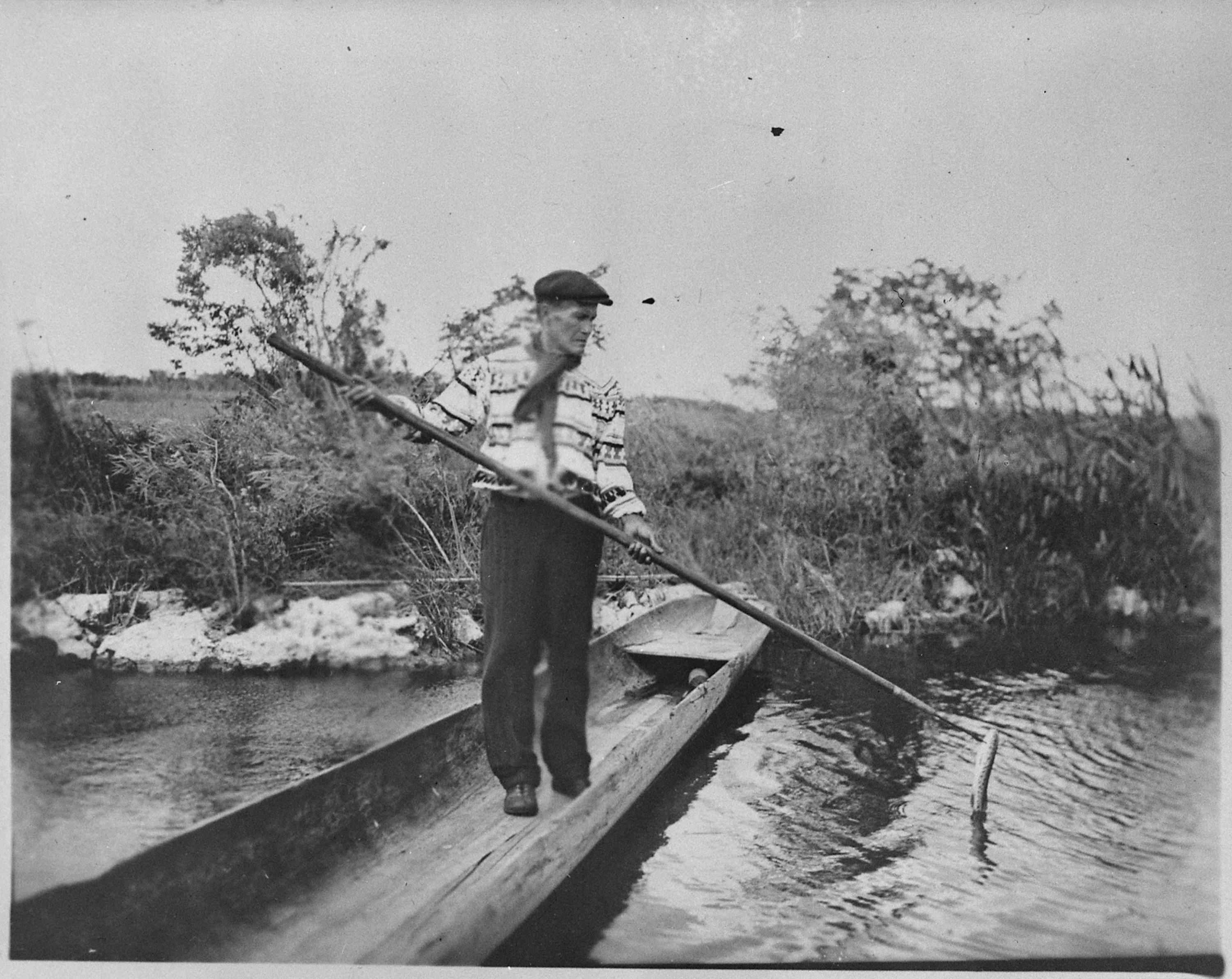
A Seminole spearing a garfish from a dugout, Florida, 1930

The Seminoles in Florida have been engaged in stock raising since the mid-1930s, when they received cattle from western Native Americans. The Bureau of Indian Affairs (BIA) hoped that the cattle raising would teach Seminoles to become citizens by adapting to agricultural settlements. The BIA also hoped that this program would lead to Seminole self-sufficiency. Cattle owners realized that by using their cattle as equity, they could engage in "new capital-intensive pursuits", such as housing.

Since then, the two Florida tribes have developed economies based chiefly on sales of duty-free tobacco, heritage and resort tourism, and gaming. On December 7, 2006, the Seminole Tribe of Florida purchased the Hard Rock Cafe chain of restaurants. They had previously licensed it for several of their casinos.

From beginnings in the 1930s during the Great Depression, the Seminole Tribe of Florida today owns "one of the largest cattle operations in Florida, and the 12th largest in the nation.

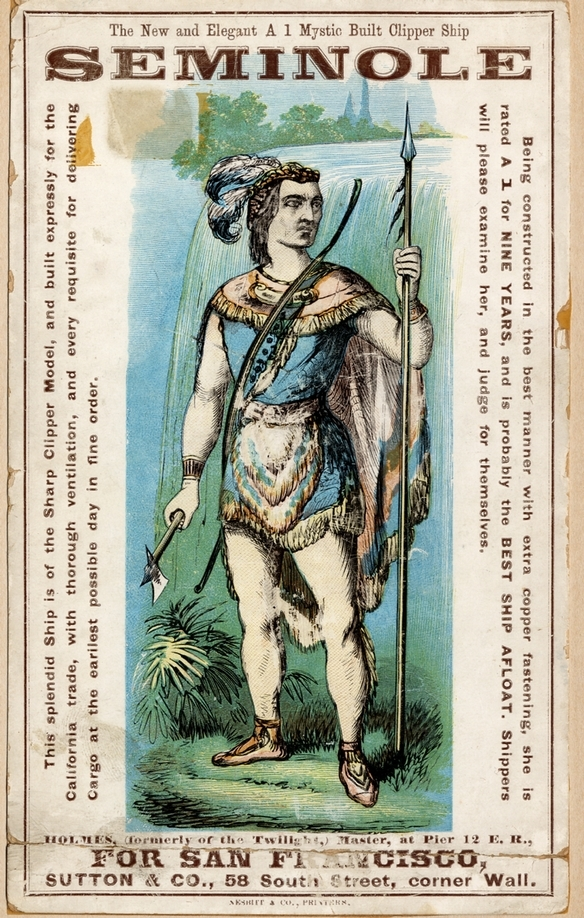
Seminole clipper ship card

In the early 20th century, Florida had a population boom after the Flagler railroad to Miami was completed. The state attracted a growing number of tourists from the North and Midwest, stimulating the development of many resort towns. In the following years, many Seminoles took jobs in the cultural tourism trade. By the 1920s, many Seminoles were involved in service jobs. In addition, they were able to market their culture by selling traditional craft products (made mostly by women) and by exhibitions of traditional skills, such as wrestling alligators (by men). Some of the crafts included woodcarving, basket weaving, beadworking, patchworking, and palmetto-doll making. These crafts are still practiced today.

In the 21st century, as gaming has become lucrative for the tribes, fewer Seminoles rely on crafts for income. The Miccosukee Tribe earns revenue by owning and operating a casino, resort, a golf club, several museum attractions, and "Indian Village". At "Indian Village", Miccosukee demonstrate traditional, pre-contact lifestyles to educate people about their culture.

"In 1979, the Seminoles opened the first casino on Indian land, ushering in what has become a multibillion-dollar industry operated by numerous tribes nationwide." This casino was the first tribally operated bingo hall in North America. Since its establishment, gaming on Native American sovereign land has been expanded under federal and state laws, and become a major source of revenue for tribal governments. Tribal gaming has provided secure employment, and the revenues have supported higher education, health insurance, services for the elderly, and personal income. In more recent years, income from the gaming industry has funded major economic projects, such as acquisition and development of sugarcane fields, citrus groves, cattle ranches, ecotourism, and commercial agriculture.

Numerous Florida place names honor the Seminole:

- Seminole County;
- Osceola County;
- Seminole, a city in Pinellas County;
- Seminole, a small community in Okaloosa County.
- Historic Seminole Heights, a residential district in Tampa, Florida.

There is also a Seminole County in Oklahoma, and a Seminole County in the southwest corner of Georgia (separated from Florida by Lake Seminole).

== Population history ==
The Seminole population appeared to be increasing during the early 19th century. It was estimated at 5,000 people in 1820, 4,883 people in 1821, as reported by Neamathla, 6,385 people in 1822, as reported by Captain Hugh Young, up to 10,000 people in 1836, at the beginning of the Second Seminole War.

Perhaps the population was increasing due to continued immigration of Indians to Florida, as well as due to assimilation of the remnants of tribes native to the region. During the Second Seminole War the Indians suffered heavy casualties. On 25 November 1841, it was reported that 623 Seminoles had been removed from Florida, with 3,190 at that time undergoing removal or about to be removed. The number of those who stayed in Florida was estimated in that report at 575.

Another source says that around 4,000 Seminole were removed to Indian Territory between 1832-1842. After their removal to Oklahoma, the Seminole population there numbered around 3,000 people in 1884 according to the enumeration published in 1886. The 1910 census reported only 1,729 Seminole.

== See also ==
- Seminole (clipper), an 1865 clipper ship
- Florida State Seminoles, athletic teams of Florida State University
