= John Jumper (Seminole chief) =

Principal Chief of the Seminole Nation 1849 - 1865 and 1882 - 1885

Colonel John Jumper
- Henehv Mēkko
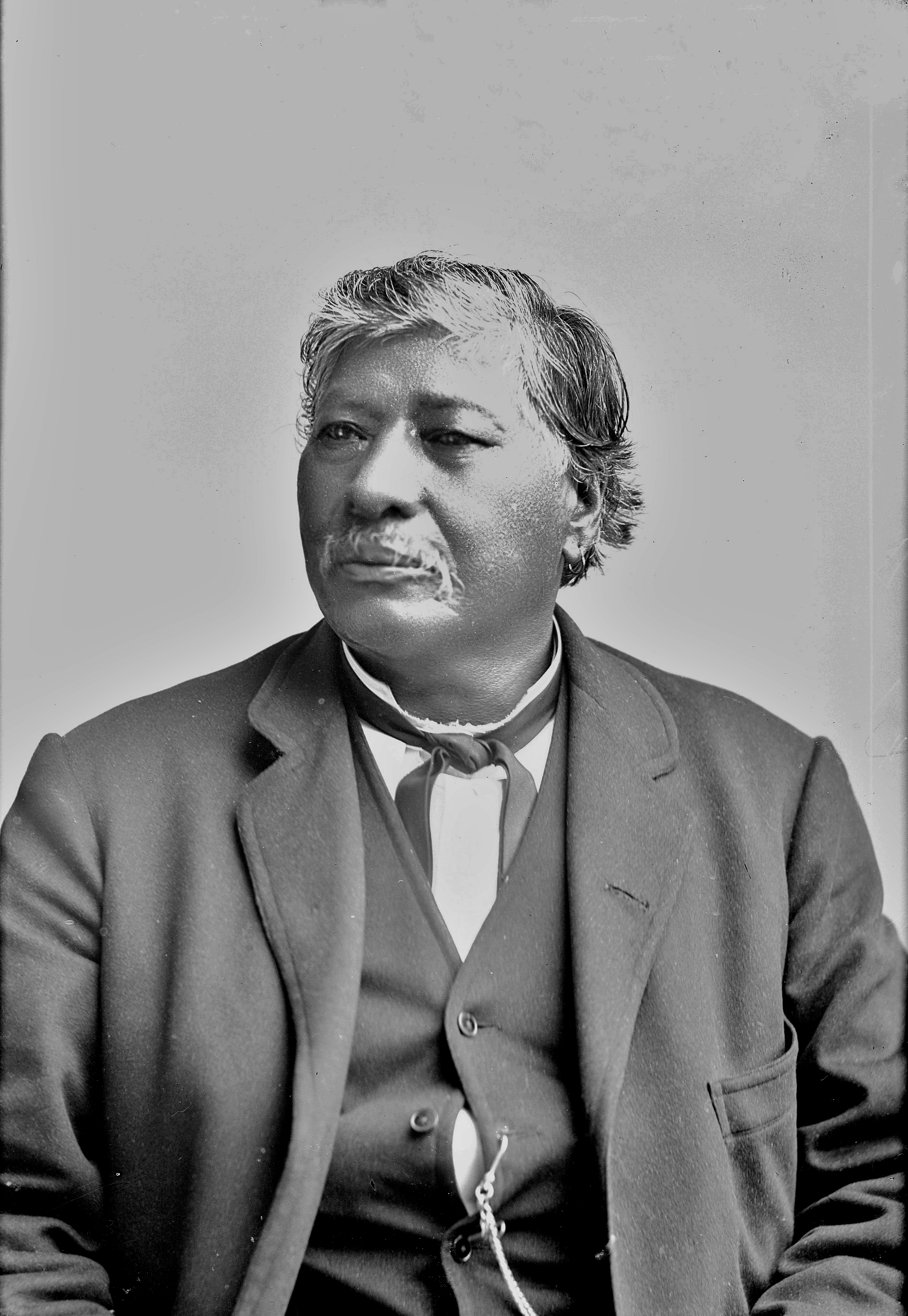
- John Jumper's Indian name was Heneha Mekko or "Assistant Chief"
- Born: c. 1820; Florida
- Died: September 21, 1896; Sasakwa, Indian Territory
- Burial place: Sasakwa, Seminole County, Oklahoma
- Military career
- Allegiance: United States of America; Confederate States
- Branch: Confederate Army
- Service years: 1861–1865 (CSA)
- Rank: Colonel
- Units: 1st Seminole Battalion and 1st Seminole Regiment

John Jumper or Heneha Mekko (Creek: Henehv Mēkko; c.1820 – September 21, 1896) was Principal Chief of the Seminole Nation from 1849 to 1865, and again from 1882 to 1885. He was also a Baptist pastor. Jumper led those Seminole who supported the Confederacy, signing a treaty with the new government in the hope of gaining an Indian state if they were successful. He served as a lieutenant colonel in the Confederate Army Seminole Mounted Volunteers.

== First chieftainship ==
Jumper fought against the United States in the Second Seminole War (1835 -1842), and was sent to Indian Territory after his capture. He was born into a prominent Seminole family, as his uncle was Micanopy, the leading chief of the Seminole tribe, and his father was Ote Emathla, a trusted advisor and brother-in-law of Micanopy and an important Seminole leader in his own right. Jumper became principal chief of the Seminoles after the death of his brother, James Jumper, in 1849. In 1850, he led a delegation to Florida to encourage the remaining Seminoles to move to Indian Territory also. As chief, he oversaw the establishment of the Seminole Nation in Indian Territory in 1856. He also supported the establishment of schools for his people by Presbyterian ministers.

== Civil War service ==
When the Civil War broke out, Chief Jumper reluctantly agreed to sign an alliance with the Confederate States of America. He also enlisted in the Confederate Army, first serving as a major in the First Battalion Seminole Mounted Rifles, and as lieutenant colonel of the First Regiment Seminole Volunteers. He led these troops in the battles of Round Mountain, Chusto-Talasah, Middle Boggy, and Second Cabin Creek.

== Post Civil War ==
After the Civil War, Jumper was ordained as a Baptist minister in 1865. He served as pastor of the Spring Baptist Church near the community of Sasakwa in the Seminole Nation, (Note: Sasakwa was in present-day Seminole County, Oklahoma.) Indian Territory, and remained as pastor there until 1894.

Because of the Seminole alliance with the Confederacy, the United States forced the tribe to sign a new peace treaty after the war. They were required to emancipate their slaves, and to offer those freedmen who wanted to stay in Indian Territory full citizenship in the tribe.

John Jumper represented the Southern Seminoles at the Fort Smith Council of 1865, where the U.S. Government recognized Union loyalist John Chupko as the Principal Chief of the Seminole Nation. (Note: Chupko and Billy Bowlegs were both Town Chiefs who refused to sign the alliance with the Confederacy. They and other Seminole Unionists joined Creek Unionists under Opotheleyahola in the withdrawal to Kansas. Chupko died in 1881.) Jumper was elected Principal Chief in 1882, and was succeeded by his son-in-law, John F. Brown in 1885.

== Death ==
John Jumper died at his home near Wewoka, Indian Territory on September 21, 1896.
