= Mystery Diners =

American reality television series (2012–2016)

- Genre: Reality
- Presented by: Charles Stiles
- Country of origin: United States
- Original language: English
- No. of seasons: 11
- No. of episodes: 143

Production
- Running time: 20–23 minutes
- Production company: T Group Productions

Original release
- Network: Food Network
- Release: December 14, 2011 – April 27, 2016

Mystery Diners is an American reality television series that aired on the Food Network from December 14, 2011, to April 27, 2016. Charles Stiles, the owner of California-based Business Evaluation Services and Mystery Shopper Services, hosts the series.

== Premise ==
The show focuses on the Mystery Diners, an organization led by Charles Stiles that goes undercover at restaurants at their owners' request, and sets up stings and hidden surveillance cameras to catch misbehaving employees in the act.

Season 9 saw Charles Stiles begin to use private investigators.

== Controversy around authenticity ==
A disclaimer at the end of the credits reads- "The people and events depicted in this program are real. Certain events may have been re-enacted for dramatic purposes."

Television reviewer Ben Pobjie wrote "Mystery Diners has achieved enormous success on SBS Food Network despite not attempting whatsoever to appear convincing. This show, which purports to 'expose' employees of restaurants ripping off their employers, contains so many implausible scenarios, inept actors and transparently fake denouements that it's really quite refreshing."

== Episodes ==
Season	Episodes	Original airing	
Season	Episodes	Season premiere	Season finale
1	8	December 14, 2011	June 29, 2012
2	13	October 19, 2012	January 25, 2013
3	13	April 19, 2013	July 10, 2013
4	13	July 17, 2013	October 9, 2013
5	13	January 6, 2014	March 31, 2014
6	13	April 7, 2014	June 30, 2014
7	13	July 30, 2014	October 13, 2014
8	13	October 13, 2014	January 7, 2015
9	15	February 4, 2015	April 29, 2015
10	14	June 3, 2015	October 21, 2015
11	15	November 4, 2015	April 27, 2016

Green text means the target/s was/were innocent.

Blue text means the target/s was/were guilty of a different crime/s or was/were tricked into being part of the main one.

Red text means the target/s was/were guilty of the main crime/s.

=== Season 1 (2012) ===
No. overall	No. in season	Title	Original release date	Prod. code	U.S. viewers (millions)
1	1	"Raiding the Bar"	December 14, 2011	YM0100H	1.21
Maeve McNamara, owner of Maeve's Residuals in Studio City, California, suspects that one of her newly hired bartenders might be over-pouring for customers, giving away too many free drinks, and over-tipping himself. Mystery Diners Shellene and Jessica go undercover as customers, and see bartender Rod drinking on the job, ignoring the regular customers in favor of Shellene and Jessica, over-pouring top-shelf alcohol, and only charging $12 for $122 worth of drinks. During the confrontation, Maeve fires Rod, forcing him to give the money from his tip jar to her. He states in his exit interview that he sees nothing wrong with building a clientele for Maeve, claiming she lost a good bartender. The narrator reveals that Rod has moved to Los Angeles and found new employment. Maeve hasn't had any more theft since Rod left, and all of her regulars have since returned. Mystery Diners: Shellene, Jessica. Targets: Rod.
2	2	"Catering on the Side"	May 20, 2012	YM0101H	1.32
Dennis Petty, owner of The Groves Bar & Grill in Gilbert, Arizona, becomes concerned about a large loss in food and supplies. Mystery Diners Danny, Shellene, and Sarah go undercover as a waiter and customers, and reveal that Dennis' recently-hired chef, David, is running his own catering business illegally using the restaurant's kitchen and supplies, and making business at The Groves suffer, with customers waiting extensively for their orders. During the confrontation, Dennis fires David, who states in his exit interview that he will continue his business without Dennis' supplies. The narrator reveals that David has gone out of business without his own overhead. The Groves' business has improved now that Dennis has all his food and supplies in check. Mystery Diners: Shellene, Danny, Sarah. Targets: David.
3	3	"Bringing Down the Haus"	May 25, 2012	YM0102H	1.28
Brett and Rose Hoffman, husband and wife owners of German restaurant Haus Murphy in Glendale, Arizona, disagree on almost everything, particularly the hiring of Rose's nephew-in-law, Gunnar, as their new restaurant manager, whom they fear is unqualified for the job. Mystery Diners Deanna, Danny, and Chris go undercover as a waitress, a customer, and a delivery man, and prove that Gunnar is a bad influence on staff, lazy, and unwelcoming to customers; he even steals beer right under his aunt's nose. During the confrontation, Rose fires Gunnar. In his exit interview, Gunnar states that Rose has betrayed him. The narrator reveals that Gunnar apologized for his actions and returned the stolen beer. Mystery Diners: Deanna, Danny, Chris. Targets: Gunnar.
4	4	"Big Earl's Gone Wild"	June 1, 2012	YM0103H	1.44
After losing thousands of dollars in unaccounted alcohol and hearing rumors of late-night staff parties, Kim Brennan, owner of Big Earl's Greasy Eats in Cave Creek, Arizona, contacts Charles, and Mystery Diners Shellene, Bradley, and Chris go undercover as a waitress and customers, hoping to score invitations to an after-hours bash. The suspected bartender, Claire, drinks on the job, pockets money that should have gone into the register, and throws an out-of-control party after the bar is closed. Kim returns to the restaurant to throw everybody out and fires Claire during the confrontation. In her exit interview, Claire maintains she did nothing wrong and claims she was set up. The narrator reveals that Claire apologized for her actions and found new employment. All of the bar's alcohol was accounted for, and revenue was back up at Big Earl's. Mystery Diners: Shellene, Bradley, Chris. Targets: Claire.
5	5	"F for Effort"	June 8, 2012	YM0104H	1.36
After receiving numerous bad-service reviews and noticing a 30% decline in revenue, Jay Wisniewski, owner of Caffe Boa in Tempe, Arizona, contacts Charles and the Mystery Diners to help him find the cause. Mystery Diner Danny goes undercover as a waiter, while Chris, Matt, and Leeann go as customers, and the four discover three problem employees: waiter Brad, waitress Gwen, and waitress-in-training Sophia. Despite calling the owner a dirty name, Gwen turns out to be a model employee. Brad is a good employee, but lacks confidence and has a temper. Sophia is the real problem: she drinks on the job, is rude to customers, and eats food off their plates. During the confrontation, Jay is disappointed by Gwen's insult but praises her work. He then encourages Brad to be more confident and fires Sophia. In their exit interviews, Gwen shows remorse for insulting her boss and states she is happy she was praised, while Brad promises to build his confidence. As for Sophia, she claims she was still able to serve properly and did nothing wrong by having something to eat and drink. The narrator reveals that Jay isn't sure where Sophia works now, but he hopes that she's learned her lesson. Brad has been taking a wine-appreciation course to build his knowledge of the menu. Gwen was promoted to head waitress. Profits and service are back to normal at Caffe Boa. Mystery Diners: Danny, Chris, Matt & Leeann. Targets: Brad, Gwen, Sophia.
6	6	"Managing Disaster"	June 15, 2012	YM0105H	1.35
Frank Vairo, owner of Amaro Italian Bistro in Cave Creek, Arizona, believes his manager, Tim, is acting inappropriately with the staff and picking favorites based on appearance. Mystery Diners Destiney (Charles' daughter) and Sarah go undercover and interview for waitress positions to see if Tim will hire an attractive server over a qualified one. This is proven true when Tim gets flirtatious with Destiney, much to Charles's ire. He also attempts to poach the staff by offering them jobs at his brother's own restaurant. During the confrontation, Tim gets into an argument with Frank and Charles, which ends with him quitting. Tim states in his exit interview that his and his brother's restaurant will be successful when they hire attractive female staff. The narrator reveals that the restaurant that Tim and his brother owned went out of business after a few months, and both are seeking employment. Frank has hired a new manager, and business has improved greatly. Mystery Diners: Sarah, Destiney. Targets: Tim.
7	7	"Grumpy Tom"	June 22, 2012	YM0106H	1.46
Charles and the Mystery Diners descend upon The Blue Moose in Scottsdale, Arizona, where longtime chef "Grumpy" Tom has a knack for disrespecting everyone in the place--including the newly-installed second-generation co-owner and manager Grey Haplin. Mystery Diner Jessica goes undercover as a waitress to prove just how grumpy Tom is and how his attitude negatively affects business. During the sting, Tom was impatient, verbally abusive, and had little respect for Grey's father and first-generation co-owner Sean Haplin. When Grey confronts him, he begins yelling as well, proving that he needs to control his own actions. When brought back to the control room for the confrontation, Tom initially walked out, but Charles lured him back in. After the discussion, they reached a compromise. The narrator reveals that Sean, Grey, and Tom implemented a training program. Tom and Grey have mutual respect. Mystery Diners: Jessica. Targets: Tom.
8	8	"Undercover Brother"	July 6, 2012	YM0107H	1.37
Rich Tyson, owner of 3 Tomatoes & A Mozzarella in Las Vegas, fears his brother/manager Andrew may not possess the skills to manage the front of the house like he does the back of the house. He also wants to look at veteran waitress Dawn, whom he fears is apathetic but turns out to be an asset to the restaurant. Mystery Diners Danny and Deanna go undercover as a customer and a waitress, and discover that Andrew is unprofessional with staff, easily agitated, and rude to customers, and even drinks on the job. Before Charles and Rich can confront him, he leaves the restaurant in the middle of his shift, and they are unable to catch him as he drives away. Rich praises Dawn and even promotes her to assistant manager. The narrator reveals that Andrew apologized for his actions and was given a second chance at his original position as kitchen manager. Business has never been better at 3 Tomatoes & A Mozzarella. Mystery Diners: Deanna, Danny. Targets: Andrew, Dawn.

=== Season 2 (2012–13) ===
No. overall	No. in season	Title	Original release date	Prod. code	U.S. viewers (millions)
9	1	"The Tipping Point"	October 19, 2012	YM0201H	1.06
After noticing low revenue and receiving numerous staff complaints that his recently-promoted head waiter, David, is not evenly distributing the pooled tips, James LaGrappe, general manager of D'Cache restaurant in North Hollywood, California, contacts Charles and the Mystery Diners to help him discover whether the rumor is true. Mystery Diners Destiney and Grant go undercover as a customer and a waiter, and they discover that David is telling customers that the card system is down and pocketing the money. In addition, he is popular with customers, having gained regulars (who James does not even know) by giving them free drinks and appetizers, but not with the staff, since he is arrogant towards them. The final straw for James comes when David tries to set up Grant by stealing an entire bill payment and then asking Grant to fetch the bill. During the confrontation, David tries to defend himself, stating that James giving tips to people who haven't earned them is stealing. James does not buy it, threatens to turn David over to the police unless he gives the money back, which he does, and then fires him. In his exit interview, David remains unremorseful, stating that he deserves more tips for bringing regulars into the restaurant. The narrator reveals that David still maintains that he did nothing wrong and was hired as a bartender at another restaurant. James has hired a new head server. Revenue and employee morale have both gone back up. Mystery Diners: Grant, Destiney. Targets: David.
10	2	"Something Smells Fishy"	October 26, 2012	YM0202H	1.13
When Mario Nasab, owner of La Traviata in Long Beach, California, has been receiving complaints from his customers about the quality of his fish, Charles and the Mystery Diners discover that Joe, a head chef inherited from previous ownership, might not be honest about what's in his high-priced dishes. Mystery Diners Rob and Shellene go undercover as a fish purveyor and a cook to reel in answers for Mario. During the sting, Joe has Shellene purchase non-organic ingredients and passes off cheap carp as Chilean sea bass, pocketing any leftover money Mario gave him to purchase ingredients for the day. During the confrontation, Mario demands the money back from Joe, who throws it in Mario's face after being fired. Joe states in his exit interview that fish is fish and expects Mario to call him back to make things up, which he says will not happen. The narrator reveals that Joe has not returned since the sting was taped. Mario rehired his former chef, Trinidad. The quality of food and customer satisfaction have risen again. Mystery Diners: Shellene, Rob. Targets: Joe.
11	3	"Getting a Leg Up"	November 2, 2012	YM0204H	1.08
Derrick Pipkin, owner of Pips on La Brea in Los Angeles, contacts Charles to investigate his waiter-turned-host Bob, who claims he hurt his leg on the day Derrick was to fire him for being rude to customers and employees. Bob threatened to sue Derrick, so Derrick made Bob a host. But Bob is still being lazy, and Derrick believes Bob is faking his injury. Mystery Diners Shellene, Lukas, and Tracy go undercover as a hostess, a customer, and a motorist with car trouble. During the sting, Bob does not train Shellene, refuses to walk Lukas to his table, and shouts at him across the dining room to tell him where to sit. Bob also refuses to sit Lukas outside until the latter bribes the former with a tip. Following this, Bob makes a rather racist remark about Lukas. He furthermore annoys Derrick and the customers by putting his foot on the desk. As Bob takes a smoke break in the parking lot, Charles brings in Tracy to pretend she has a flat tire. Infatuated by Tracy, Bob removes his cast and changes the tire before accepting an invite to drink and dance with her, exposing his scheme to Derrick. Derrick fires Bob during the confrontation, leg brace and all. Bob denies faking his injury in his exit interview and claims that the accusations Derrick made against him were ridiculous. The narrator reveals that Derrick has not seen Bob since the sting was taped. Pips has relaunched, and business has never been better. Mystery Diners: Shellene, Lukas, Tracy. Targets: Bob.
12	4	"Raising the Stakes"	November 9, 2012	YM0205H	1.04
Ali Rabbani, owner of Marrakesh Restaurant in Studio City, California, is concerned about a decline in customers, as well as discrepancies in his catering business and his manager John's behavior. Mystery Diners Rob, Loree, and Scarlett go undercover as a waiter, a dancer, and a customer to serve him the truth. Even before the sting, the Mystery Diners had noticed John's unprofessional behavior and learned that he has a gambling and alcohol addiction and never gets enough sleep. During the sting, he is caught drinking on the job, giving catering samples intended for Scarlett to his friends, closing the restaurant early so he and his friends could play poker, and stealing money from Ali's safe to support his gambling addiction. Ali fires John during the confrontation. John's exit interview states that he has been a loyal employee for two years and that Ali should have come to him earlier. The narrator reveals that John apologized to Ali and is seeking help for his gambling addiction. Ali has hired a new manager. Profits have gone back up. Mystery Diners: Rob, Loree, Scarlett. Targets: John.
13	5	"Extra Curricular"	November 16, 2012	YM0206H	0.97
Johnny Persico, owner of Pina Pizza House in Downey, California, has been noticing discrepancies in beer sales, as well as an increase in voided tickets, and believes his "frat-tastic" college-enrolled waiter, Jed, may not have his best interests at heart and might be taking the party off-campus and into his restaurant. Mystery Diners Grant and Jill go undercover as a busboy and a sorority girl to see if Jed is taking his job as seriously as he claims to take his classes. During the sting, he is caught displaying poor customer service by talking on his cell phone, drinking on the job, serving alcohol without seeing identification, and intentionally messing up orders to give his friends free pizza. Right before Johnny goes to confront Jed, he prepares to sell a keg of beer to Jill. Johnny fires Jed during the confrontation, and he shows remorse in his exit interview. The narrator reveals that Jed and his friends have not returned to the restaurant since the taping of this sting. Johnny is no longer losing money, and his food sales are all accounted for. Mystery Diners: Grant, Jill. Targets: Jed.
14	6	"Valet Disservice"	November 23, 2012	YM0203H	1.01
Ever since his regular valet driver, Jose, took a personal leave, George Sarkis, owner and head chef of Ca'Brea in Los Angeles, has been receiving complaints about his substitute valet driver Rob, who works at an independent valet company, as well as his delivery driver Dylan. With Mystery Diners Hank and Tracy posing as customers, Rob is seen rummaging through cars, stealing exposed money and a cell phone from Tracy's car, and taking Hank's Bentley for a delivery with Dylan, leaving the lot unattended. During the confrontation, George fires Rob and suspends Dylan for a week. In their exit interviews, Rob orders the cameraman to leave him alone while Dylan expresses remorse for his actions. The narrator reveals that the valet company also terminated Rob after being notified of his actions. Dylan no longer causes problems. Jose returned from his personal leave, and George is no longer getting complaints. Mystery Diners: Hank, Tracy. Targets: Rob, Dylan.
15	7	"Sleeping on the Job"	December 7, 2012	YM0207H	1.08
Marc Sgrizzi, owner and head chef of Parma in Las Vegas, has been noticing discrepancies in sales receipts and inventory with his high-end Italian deli meats and suspects that two of his employees, Peter and Diane, who have full access to the restaurant, are responsible for these losses. Mystery Diners Shane and Adam go undercover as a busboy and a customer, and discover that Peter is down on his luck and has been using restaurant supplies to pull himself up. As for Diane, she is shown to be an asset to the business and provides excellent customer service. Peter is caught bartering food for concert tickets, then selling the tickets to customers, using the restaurant's phone for personal calls (as he pawned his cell phone), which Diane calls him out on, and pawning Marc's prized prosciutto to get his cell phone back. During the confrontation, Peter explains that his mother evicted him six months earlier and was acting selfishly to survive. Marc reluctantly decides to give him a second chance and help him get back on his feet. In his exit interview, Peter shows remorse by stating that being homeless was no excuse for what he did. The narrator reveals that Marc has helped Peter get back on his feet and has finished expanding the restaurant, which is no longer losing money. Mystery Diners: Shane, Adam. Targets: Peter, Diane.
16	8	"Singles Night"	December 14, 2012	YM0208H	1.05
When Will Glenn, co-owner of Whiskey Dick's in Las Vegas, becomes concerned over a steady decline in female patrons and food and drink sales, Mystery Diners Shellene, Barbara, and Andy go undercover as a waitress and customers, and learn that Will's night manager Nikki, is serving more than just drinks from the bar. She is seen giving away free food and alcohol, reusing a promotion that Will discontinued a few months earlier, ignoring women coming to the restaurant, and encouraging the wait staff to take care of the men by setting up an unauthorized dating service that Will did not approve. During the confrontation, Will fires Nikki along with her servers. In her exit interview, Nikki claims she was fired just for helping customers. The narrator reveals that Will has not seen Nikki or her servers since the taping of this sting. Will has hired a new wait staff and manager. The female patrons and profits have returned. Mystery Diners: Shellene, Barbara, Andy. Targets: Nikki. NOTE: Will is the business partner of Rich Tyson from 3 Tomatoes & A Mozzarella (from "Undercover Brother").
17	9	"Sour Grapes"	December 21, 2012	YM0209H	N/A
Scott Ghormley, owner and head chef of Rhythm Kitchen in Las Vegas, suspects his sophisticated but slightly-arrogant wine sommelier Faz of somehow negatively affecting wine sales. Charles sends Mystery Diners Chelsea and Hollie in as customers to find out. During the sting, Faz is seen being rude to customers by pushing low-quality wine on customers instead of honoring their requests, accepting kickbacks from the wine distributor, and charging wine sales to his personal account. During the confrontation, Scott fires Faz for his theft and rudeness and takes over the sommelier responsibilities himself. Faz's exit interview has him maintaining that he did not steal anything. The narrator doesn't reveal what happened to Faz after getting fired, but he does mention that wine sales and customer satisfaction have improved. Mystery Diners: Chelsea, Hollie. Targets: Faz.
18	10	"Night Shift"	January 4, 2013	YM0210H	1.22
Janaya Mallow, general manager of Putter's Bar & Grill in Las Vegas, has been noticing dramatic drops in sales during the graveyard shift. Mystery Diners Adam, Hollie, and Barbara go undercover as customers, and discover that overnight bartender J.R. has been running his own bar out of Putter's called "The Junkyard." He taps his own beer, allows his friends to pour their own drinks and cook their own food, and leaves the restaurant during his shift to go to his other job as a limo driver while asking one of his friends to manage the bar. During the confrontation, J.R. recognizes Charles and immediately leaves while ordering the pursuing cameraman to stop following him. The narrator reveals that Janaya doesn't know J.R.'s current whereabouts and has hired a new overnight bartender. Profits have returned to normal. Mystery Diners: Adam, Hollie, Barbara. Targets: J.R..
19	11	"My Brother's Keeper"	January 11, 2013	YM0211H	N/A
Nico Santucci, owner of Capo's Italian Cuisine in Las Vegas, has been hearing complaints that his brother/manager, Dominick, is acting inappropriately with female employees and customers. Mystery Diners Andy and Jennifer go undercover as customers. In addition to catching Dominick hitting on female patrons, they discover that Larry, a disgruntled waiter, has been stealing money and supplies from the restaurant. During the confrontation, Nico fires Larry and gives Dominick a second chance. In his exit interview, Dominick shows remorse and promises to curb his behavior for his brother. The narrator reveals that Dominick has toned down his behavior and that Larry has apologized for his actions and found employment elsewhere. Business at Capo's has never been better. Mystery Diners: Andy, Jennifer. Targets: Dominick, Larry. NOTE: This restaurant was later featured on Paramount Network's Bar Rescue, hosted by Jon Taffer in 2021.
20	12	"Love Hurts"	January 18, 2013	YM0212H	1.07
Jeff and Rhonda Wyatt, husband and wife owners of Marche Bacchus in Las Vegas, contact Charles regarding the breakup of their manager, Layla, and waiter, Flavio. The drama following the break-up has caused most of the waitstaff to quit. In addition, the owners have received complaints that Layla isn't distributing tables evenly, and rumors are circulating that Flavio is aggressive toward female employees. Mystery Diners Destiney, Chris, and Rodrigo go undercover as a hostess and customers and discover that Layla is still hung up on Flavio, punishing him by not giving him any tables, as well as the other servers who interact with him. Flavio states that he has learned his lesson about dating coworkers and is not tempted to flirt. Meanwhile, Layla is seen flirting inappropriately with Chris and Rodrigo, and offers them free wine and appetizers, but retracts her offer after indirectly learning they are not interested in her. She even throws water in Flavio's face in front of customers. During the confrontation, the owners fire Layla. Layla states in her exit interview that Flavio used and abused her and hooked up with every girl in the restaurant. The narrator doesn't reveal what happened to Layla afterwards, but he does mention that Jeff and Rhonda implemented a strict no-dating policy amongst their staff and hired a new manager. Employee morale and customer satisfaction have both returned to normal. Mystery Diners: Destiney, Chris, Rodrigo. Targets: Layla, Flavio.
21	13	"Where's the Beef?"	January 25, 2013	YM0213H	1.06
Adam Gomes, owner of Via Brasil in Las Vegas, is concerned that meat sales are not being reflected in his register, and suspects that either his manager, J.P., or head waiter, Darin, is stealing meat or letting customers take leftovers home, which is against the restaurant's policy. Mystery Diners Allison, Andy, and Lou go undercover as a waitress, a meat distributor, and a customer. While they see that Darin is a model employee, they catch J.P. breaking the restaurant's policy against taking food home, stealing meat, and scamming customers with a fake charity in exchange for free trips to the buffet, which Lou is not fooled by after noticing some inaccuracies on the poster. During the confrontation, Adam fires J.P. and threatens to call the police if he returns. In his exit interview, J.P. says that by the next year, the charity will be the biggest thing the world has seen, and he will be a hero. The narrator reveals that J.P.'s fake charity has not been heard of since the taping of this sting. Darin was promoted to J.P.'s former position as manager. All of the meat was accounted for, and profits have returned to normal. Mystery Diners: Allison, Andy, Lou. Targets: J.P., Darin.

=== Season 3 (2013) ===
No. overall	No. in season	Title	Original release date	Prod. code	U.S. viewers (millions)
22	1	"Dining in the Dark"	April 19, 2013	YM0302H	1.11
Hernan Stutzer, owner of Catharsis in Miami, has been receiving complaints about inappropriate touching and theft of items during the restaurant's monthly "Dining in the Dark" event, and suspects that three newly-hired servers, Cary, Gaby, and Juan, are responsible for these complaints. Mystery Diners Billy and Hollie go undercover as a waiter and customer, and discover that, while Juan is a model employee, Cary and Gaby have created a game by stealing from customers and screwing with them and their food, with the loser buying the winner drinks. Hernan fires them during the confrontation. In their exit interviews, Cary is annoyed about being fired, but even more annoyed that Gaby threw him under the bus, while Gaby claims she got fired for returning Hollie's sunglasses, which Cary stole as part of the game. The narrator reveals that Cary and Gaby have gone their separate ways. Juan has been promoted to head waiter, and Hernan has installed security cameras to discourage this kind of behavior from happening again. Mystery Diners: Billy, Hollie. Targets: Cary, Gaby, Juan.
23	2	"Cheese-Burglar"	April 26, 2013	YM0301H	1.13
When Stephanie Vitori and Danielle "D-Rock", owners of Cheeseburger Baby in Miami Beach, notice sales discrepancies, they ask Charles to investigate an ex-con waiter they hired named Guillermo to give him a second chance at life. Mystery Diners Tracy and John go undercover as a waitress and a customer, and reveal that Guillermo is innocent. (But he's short-tempered with difficult customers.) Waitress Krystia is behind the theft and is framing Guillermo due to his criminal past, making him her scapegoat. During the confrontation, Krystia tries to defend herself, but the owners are fed up with her lies and order her to confess. She eventually returns the money, but they fire her and apologize to Guillermo for thinking he had stolen it. The narrator reveals that Krystia was never heard from again. Guillermo was celebrating his 10-month anniversary at Cheeseburger Baby. The owners have implemented a new theft-preventing register system and are no longer losing money. Mystery Diners: Tracy, John. Targets: Guillermo, Krystia
24	3	"Party Monster"	May 3, 2013	YM0303H	1.06
George Farge, owner of George's On Sunset in Coral Gables, Florida, thinks his staff is going too far with the party atmosphere after noticing significant revenue loss, and suspects that his manager, Danny, bartender Wayne, and waiter Ivan are giving away free food and drinks. Mystery Diners Rob and Jenny go undercover as a customer and a waitress, and discover that, while Ivan is shown to be an asset to the business, Danny and Wayne have turned the restaurant into a frat house; they over-serve women free shots, give their friends free food and letting them drink from a beer bong called "The Worm", and put too many flaming sparklers in a birthday sundae, which threatens to burn down the whole restaurant while Danny wears George's Napoleon hat. During the confrontation, George fires Danny and Wayne. The narrator reveals that Danny and Wayne found employment elsewhere. Ivan has been promoted to Danny's former position as manager. Revenue has gone back up, and only George is allowed to wear his Napoleon hat. Mystery Diners: Jenny, Rob. Targets: Wayne, Ivan, Danny.
25	4	"Catch of the Day"	May 10, 2013	YM0304H	1.28
Luis Garcia, owner of Garcia's Seafood in Miami, has been noticing an unusually low amount of stone crabs and an increased amount of wasted product, and believes that his fisherman, Alex (whose father worked for Luis' business long ago), is stealing from him while prep cook Cal is cooking his own way. With Mystery Diner Harry posing as a dockhand, the team finds out that Alex has been drinking on the job, selling the catch to another buyer, and keeping the money for himself, while Cal has been lazy with filleting the fish. Luis goes rough on Alex during the confrontation, fires him, and then gives Cal one more chance to improve his filleting skills. In their exit interviews, Alex states that other fishermen have gotten away with stealing and making more money than he has, while Cal shows remorse and admits he needs to pay more attention to how he is supposed to cook. The narrator reveals that Alex is working at another fishing company. Cal has improved his filleting skills and is no longer wasting product. Luis has installed an expensive security system to watch his restaurant from his office. There is no more missing inventory at Garcia's Seafood. Mystery Diners: Harry. Targets: Alex, Cal.
26	5	"All in the Family"	May 17, 2013	YM0305H	0.99
U.J. Mollere, owner of R&O's Restaurant in Metairie, Louisiana, has been noticing several new employees quitting without explanation. His main suspects are his niece/floor manager, Amanda, his niece/waitress, Dee Dee, and his nephew/busboy, Chris. Mystery Diners Deanna and Andrew go undercover as a waitress and a customer, and discover big problems: Dee Dee is rude to customers and non-family employees, and rubs food on her body. Chris is constantly late and studies obsessively late at night for school, getting only a few moments of sleep. Amanda, on the other hand, is shown to be a model employee. During the confrontation, U.J. fires Dee Dee for her blatant disrespect and forbids her to return. She threatens to send her mother to confront him on her way out. Chris apologizes, saying he has college work to do, and his uncle says he will talk to his mother about it. The narrator reveals that Dee Dee has apologized for her actions after being reprimanded by her mother and has moved on to another job. With a lighter workload, Chris has gotten straight A's. Amanda was promoted to assistant manager. U.J. has hired new employees who are fitting in with his family. Mystery Diners: Deanna, Andrew. Targets: Amanda, Dee Dee, Chris. NOTE: This restaurant was later featured on the Travel Channel's Man v. Food, hosted by Casey Webb in 2017.
27	6	"Friends with Benefits"	May 24, 2013	YM0306H	1.21
Arthur "King Creole" and Shawnette "Tambourine Green" Humphrey, husband and wife owners of World Famous N'awlins Jazz Café and Oyster Bar in New Orleans, have just opened their restaurant two months earlier and are getting complaints of poor customer service. Mystery Diners Nicole, Andrew, and Damon go undercover as a waitress, a customer, and a seafood distributor, and discover that their manager, Chastity, has accepted unauthorized delivery deals and staffed the place with her friends, most of whom are not qualified, including bartender Sinae. Roger, a waiter and Chastity's boyfriend, is shown constantly taking breaks, and they are both shown eating a messed-up order and being rude to difficult customers. During the confrontation, the owners fire Chastity and Roger. In her exit interview, Chastity remains unremorseful for her actions and states that since the owners are married, they should not have problems with their employees dating. Charles states that Sinae could be a good employee. The narrator doesn't mention what happened to Chastity and Roger afterwards, but he does mention that Sinae was offered a second chance, only to quit. The owners have fired Chastity's friends and hired qualified people. Business is now booming at the World Famous N'awlins Café. Mystery Diners: Nicole, Andrew, Damon. Targets: Chastity, Roger, Sinae.
28	7	"Barbecue Blues"	May 31, 2013	YM0309H	1.20
Terry Wootan, owner of Cooper's Old Time Pit Bar-B-Que in Fort Worth, Texas, receives news from his friends that they bought a barbecue sauce that is identical to his family's secret recipe from a food truck in Arlington, Texas and suspects that his head chef Bobby is selling the recipe to his competitors since he is the only non-family employee who knows the recipe. Mystery Diners Ben, Justin, and Andy go undercover as a prep cook and business people and discover that Bobby did share the recipe with the rest of the kitchen staff, but he is not the one selling it. Terry's nephew/manager, Michael, is. During the confrontation, Terry fires him. Michael's exit interview reveals that he was trying to increase his uncle's business's revenue. Afterwards, Terry gifts Charles a cowboy hat in appreciation for his help. The narrator reveals that Michael was disowned from the family business. Bobby was let off with a warning, and he and the rest of the kitchen staff have signed non-disclosure agreements. Michael's scam inspired Terry to bottle and sell his barbecue sauce at his own discretion. Mystery Diners: Ben, Andy, Justin. Targets: Bobby, Michael.
29	8	"No Laughing Matter"	June 7, 2013	YM0307H	0.96
Keith Chifici, owner of Deanie's Seafood in New Orleans, has been receiving complaints from customers about his manager, Bill, a wannabe comedian, and is worried that some of his other employees may be taking advantage of Bill. Mystery Diners Andrew and Deanna go undercover as a waiter and a customer, and learn that while Bill's jokes are hurting the business, waiter Carlos has been taking advantage of Bill by drinking on the job and stealing wine while he performs his stand-up routine in the middle of the restaurant. During the confrontation, Keith fires Carlos and suspends Bill for three months with a demotion to waiter on his return. In their exit interviews, Carlos remains unremorseful, stating that the wine was cheap, while Bill says his suspension is a step in the right direction for his comedy career. The narrator reveals that Carlos is working at another restaurant. Bill continues his dream of being a professional comedian and performs at clubs around New Orleans. Customer satisfaction is back up at Deanie's Seafood. Mystery Diners: Andrew, Deanna. Targets: Bill, Carlos.
30	9	"Crazy Hearts"	June 14, 2013	YM0308H	1.18
A.J. "Poppy" Tusa, owner of The Crazy Lobster in New Orleans, has been receiving complaints from his management and customers about constant fighting between the kitchen staff, particularly the grill supervisor Rick and cook Jason; also, his nephew/bartender Shane, a part-time animal trainer, has been bringing wild animals into the restaurant. Mystery Diners Nicole and Amber go undercover as a waitress and a customer, and reveal the cause of the kitchen staff's feud: waitress Felecia has been playing Rick and Jason against each other since she is dating Jason and having an affair with Rick. This is causing Rick to constantly pick on and berate Jason in the hope that Jason will quit, leaving him with Felecia all to himself. Meanwhile, Shane tries to impress Amber by showing off a baby alligator. During the confrontation, Jason lashes out at Rick upon what was revealed as Poppy breaks up the argument. Poppy fires Felecia and Rick and suspends Jason and Shane for two weeks. In his exit interview, Jason expresses concern over what will happen if he sees Felecia again. The narrator reveals that Felecia and Rick have gone their separate ways. Jason has been promoted to Rick's former position as grill supervisor. Shane no longer brings wild animals into the restaurant. Life at The Crazy Lobster is now a little less chaotic. Mystery Diners: Nicole, Amber. Targets: Jason, Rick, Shane, Felecia.
31	10	"Off the Menu"	June 21, 2013	YM0310H	1.21
Francesco Farris, owner of Zio Cecio in Dallas, has been hearing reviews about Tex-Mex food being served in his Italian restaurant, as well as hearing numerous customers request this food repeatedly. Mystery Diners Tracy and Justin go undercover as a waitress and a customer, and prove that Francesco was right to be concerned: his head chef Tim and floor manager Allison have been running a weekly cash-only side business serving subpar Tex-Mex food called "La Paqueña Cocina"; Allison also tells the waitstaff to push the Tex-Mex menu for a cash incentive and poaches customers with plans to open their own restaurant in six months. During the confrontation, Francesco fires Tim and Allison. In their exit interviews, Allison complains of unfair treatment, and Tim states that he's one of Dallas' best chefs and will be successful in six months. The narrator reveals that there is no indication of whether Tim and Allison were successful in opening their own Tex-Mex restaurant. Francesco has hired a new head chef and floor manager. Tex-Mex food is no longer being served in the restaurant. Mystery Diners: Tracy, Justin. Targets: Tim, Allison.
32	11	"Chop Shop"	June 28, 2013	YM0311H	1.57
Rick Fairless, owner of Stroker's Ice House, a biker bar and grill and motorcycle shop in Dallas, and his mother hire Charles to investigate a revenue dip that might be caused by his manager Chris, who replaced his mother when she retired. Mystery Diners Hollie and Justin go undercover as a waitress and a customer, and find that while Chris is not behind the loss, he is a very inattentive manager. Meanwhile, waitresses Sammi and Kim have been stealing money behind Chris's back, while Chris plays video games. Sammi is seen stealing and selling motorcycle parts with her mechanic boyfriend, Lobo, who works at Rick's motorcycle shop. Rick fires Sammi and Lobo during the confrontation, and his mother tells them to take Kim with them. The narrator reveals that Lobo, Sammi, and Kim have found new employment. Chris was demoted to bartender, only to resign. Rick's mother has temporarily returned to work and is interviewing new managers. Rick is no longer losing money or motorcycle parts. Mystery Diners: Hollie, Justin. Targets: Chris, Kim, Sammi, Lobo.
33	12	"An Officer and a Gentleman"	July 3, 2013	YM0312H	1.41
Keith "Buttons" Hicks, owner and head chef of Buttons Restaurant in Dallas, has been receiving complaints from his staff about his ex-military manager, Tony, being too strict, therefore costing the restaurant employees and customers. Mystery Diners Ben, Justin, and Nicole go undercover as a waiter and customers, and see Tony make Otis, an ROTC trainee who idolizes him, do push-ups and run laps around the restaurant for being 48 minutes late and improperly dealing with a difficult customer, and cause Buttons' best waitress, Shanitha, to quit. During the confrontation, Tony states that he was only keeping the employees in line and tells Buttons to fire him if he must. Having also served in the military, Buttons decides not to fire Tony. Instead, he advises him to mellow his approach. In his exit interview, Tony expresses remorse and admits he needs to learn how to have fun. Charles advises Keith to rehire Shanitha. The narrator reveals that although Tony still expects perfection from the staff, he is taking a more positive approach to his job. Shanitha was immediately rehired and promoted to head waitress. The employees are now getting along with Tony. Mystery Diners: Ben, Justin, Nicole. Targets: Tony, Otis.
34	13	"Cooking the Books"	July 10, 2013	YM0313H	1.70
Jamie and Francine Alba, husband and wife owners of Sisley Italian Kitchen in Sherman Oaks, California, hire Charles to investigate financial discrepancies that might be caused by their bookkeeper Pamela. Mystery Diners Loree and Mark go undercover as a waitress and a busboy and catch Pamela arriving late, making personal phone calls, and sleeping and eating on the job. Still, she is actually honest when she reports a cash discrepancy to manager Mike. Mike is revealed to be behind the discrepancies by collecting an extra paycheck for a fictitious employee named Hector Rodriguez, collecting a check for a window-cleaning company after firing them (which he did not have the authority to do), and making the bussers clean the windows. During the confrontation, Mike tries to defend himself, saying that the restaurant was getting cleaned, but the owners have had enough and fire him. In his exit interview, Mike states he knows what he is worth and can find a job anywhere. As for Pamela, the owners suspended her for her negligence at Charles's advice. The narrator reveals that Mike and "Hector" have stopped collecting undeserved paychecks. Pamela returned to work following her suspension and is now more attentive on the job. Jamie and Francine are no longer losing money at Sisley Italian Kitchen. Mystery Diners: Loree, Mark. Targets: Pamela, Mike.

=== Season 4 (2013) ===
No. overall	No. in season	Title	Original release date	Prod. code	U.S. viewers (millions)
35	1	"Chef's Choice"	July 17, 2013	YM0401H	1.45
Patrick Holleran, owner of Buster's Beach House in Long Beach, California, is concerned about increased pouring costs that may have been caused by his bartender, K.P., after noticing several bottles of top-shelf alcohol missing and not being accounted for. Mystery Diners Tracy and Shelby go undercover as a waitress and a customer, and confirm that K.P. is stealing money by charging customers for top-shelf alcohol but ringing them up for well drinks, and using fruit slices to count how much money to pocket. In addition, head chef Johnny has been responsible for sexual-harassment cases unknown to Patrick and showing a preference for the female waitstaff (he is also shown verbally abusing waiter Brian by calling him "Brianna", even after being told to stop). During the confrontation, Patrick forces K.P. to give back the money, then fires him and Johnny. Johnny is remorseful in his exit interview and plans to make reparations for his actions. The narrator reveals that K.P. has found employment elsewhere. Johnny has apologized for his behavior and is seeking counseling. Patrick has hired a new head chef and bartender. There is no more missing money, alcohol, or fruit. Mystery Diners: Tracy, Shelby. Targets: K.P., Johnny.
36	2	"Naked Lunch"	July 24, 2013	YM0402H	1.14
After losing several sushi models, Bruce, owner of Lotus on Flower in Los Angeles, fears that one of his best customers is behaving inappropriately during the restaurant's "naked sushi" dining experience. Charles sends Mystery Diner Christine undercover as a model to discover who is encouraging the inappropriate behavior. Mystery Diners: Christine Targets: NOTE: This episode only aired once and was pulled from Food Network's rotation for unknown reasons.
37	3	"Strange Brew"	July 31, 2013	YM0403H	1.42
Michael Madlock, owner of Newport Beach Brewing Company in Newport Beach, California, has been hearing reviews about beers being sold that he does not brew, as well as noticing a decline in beer sales, even with more customers, and suspects that his brewmaster, Derek, is running a side business. Mystery Diners Amber and Grant go undercover as a customer and a barback, and discover that Derek is not behind the side business. Michael's bartender Mike is, along with waiter Danny. Mike admits he is brewing his own flavor brands of beer at home, which turn out disgusting, and promoting them at Michael's restaurant. The decline in sales is then revealed; Mike refuses to accept credit cards, since his beer is not in the system. During the confrontation, Michael fires Mike. Mike remains unremorseful in his exit interview, claiming that Michael lost an opportunity to market and sell his flavored beer brands that could have helped his business. The narrator reveals that Mike has been unsuccessful in promoting his own beer. Danny has also been terminated for his involvement and is now working at another restaurant. Derek continues to be a valuable employee. No more off-menu drinks are being served. Mystery Diners: Grant, Amber. Targets: Derek, Mike, Danny.
38	4	"Employee of the Month"	August 7, 2013	YM0404H	1.32
After hearing customer complaints of employees constantly arguing, Vic Parrino, owner of Colombo's Italian Steakhouse in Los Angeles, fears that the Employee of the Month competition is the reason, with four-time Employee of the Month-winning waitress Dayna possibly bragging about her winning streak. Mystery Diners: Grant and Shelby go undercover as a waiter and a customer, and prove Vic correct: waiter Marco is jealous of Dayna constantly winning and shows it by spitting on her car. Dayna is seen rigging the competition by badmouthing her co-workers and sabotaging Marco by throwing away his ticket orders as soon as they're printed. After she insults a customer, Vic confronts and attempts to fire her, warning her to get her car off his property before he calls a tow truck. Still, when she apologizes and pleads to keep her job, Vic reluctantly gives her a second chance, but says she must pay him $1,000 back ($250 was part of the prize per month). In her exit interview, Dayna states that she has been overly competitive for the past four months. The narrator reveals that Dayna has apologized to everyone and repaid the money ever since she was given a second chance. The Employee of the Month competition has been discontinued, and Vic instead rewards the entire staff for working together. With the employees being treated equally, tension has disappeared. Mystery Diners: Grant, Shelby. Targets: Marco, Dayna.
39	5	"While the Cat's Away..."	August 14, 2013	YM0405H	1.21
After nearly losing his life in a paragliding accident in Brazil, Kevin Aksacki, owner of Gauchos Village in Glendale, California, is finding discrepancies in his revenue and inventory since his return to the business; he suspects that his general manager Miguel is responsible for these losses since he is in charge of ordering and receiving the food, as well as his chef Gabriel, who handles the meat. Mystery Diners Grant and Amber go undercover as a waiter and a customer, and see Miguel badmouthing Kevin to the staff, letting female customers take leftovers home (which is against normal practice of a churrascaria), selling large amounts of meat to the staff for cheap prices and keeping the money for himself, and using the meat and the restaurant's alcohol to host a cookout at his house. Gabriel, on the other hand, is shown to have nothing to do with Miguel's actions. During the confrontation, Miguel claims the cookout was supposed to be a surprise for Kevin to celebrate his return, but Kevin doesn't believe him and fires him. In his exit interview, Miguel claims the restaurant was successful while Kevin was recovering from his accident. The narrator reveals that Miguel has found employment elsewhere. Gabriel has been promoted to executive chef. Kevin has returned to full-time work, retrained the staff, and is no longer experiencing inventory problems. Mystery Diners: Grant, Amber. Targets: Miguel, Gabriel.
40	6	"Too Many Cooks"	August 21, 2013	YM0406H	1.30
Pascal Berthoumieux, owner of Bistro Bordeaux in Evanston, Illinois, has received complaints about his new head chef, Mark. Mystery Diners Jay and Nicole go undercover as a waiter and a food critic, and discover that, while Mark is verbally abusive to the rest of the kitchen staff due to his anger management issues, the real culprit is sous chef Brian, who believes he should have been promoted to head chef and badmouths Mark to the whole staff behind his back. Brian also tells customers that he is the head chef and tampers with food so that Mark will be fired and he can step into the position. During the confrontation, Brian tries to defend his actions. Still, Charles points out that he is the last person who should be the head chef after he was caught on tape sabotaging Mark's orders, making negative comments to the waitstaff, and lying to cover up his scam. Pascal fires Brian, who claims in his exit interview that he should be the head chef. Pascal apologizes to Mark and advises him to work on his anger issues. The narrator reveals that Brian has not yet been rehired as a sous chef. With no one sabotaging his food, Mark no longer has anger issues at work. Pascal's restaurant is getting positive reviews. Mystery Diners: Jay, Nicole. Targets: Mark, Brian.
41	7	"Wine on Wheels"	August 28, 2013	YM0407H	1.37
Gary "Big" Strauss and Tony "Little" D'Alessandro, owners of Big and Little's Restaurant in Chicago, have been hearing rumors that employees are illegally selling alcohol to customers at their restaurant, which does not have a liquor license, but allows customers to bring their own drinks. Mystery Diners Siera and Destiney go undercover as a food runner and a customer, and catch manager Gregg charging an unauthorized $10 corkage fee for any outside liquors and doing a side business selling alcohol with his friend Enrique, who is posing as an employee of the restaurant, which nearly attracts the attention of a passing police car. Tony attempts to confront Enrique, but he drives off before he can. He and Gary subsequently fire Gregg and order him to inform Enrique that he is never to return. In his exit interview, Gregg states that he was trying to bring more customers into the restaurant. The narrator reveals that Gregg and Enrique were never heard from again. Everyone else involved was either reprimanded or terminated. Alcohol is no longer being served at Big and Little's. Mystery Diners: Siera, Destiney. Targets: Gregg, Enrique. NOTE: One of the owners, Tony, competed on Season 6 of Gordon Ramsay's Hell's Kitchen in 2009, finishing in 14th place. This restaurant was also previously featured on Guy Fieri's Diners, Drive-Ins and Dives in 2011.
42	8	"Lactose Intolerant"	September 4, 2013	YM0408H	1.35
Chris Johnston, owner of Cheesie's Pub and Grub in Chicago, suspects his manager Joe, cashier Sara, and best friend/waiter Patrick have fixed his grilled-cheese-eating contest (there have been nine winners over the course of two months, and most of them are petite women), leading to a decline in alcohol sales (two hours of free drinks are part of the prize). Mystery Diners David and Destiney go undercover as customers participating in the contest, and discover that Patrick and Sara have been playing by the rules for male contestants they do not know, but cheating to help their friends and attractive female contestants win, and giving away undeserved free drinks behind Chris and Joe's backs. In addition, they give free drinks to the winners' friends who come in with them, even though only the winner is supposed to receive them. Patrick and Sara are also caught accepting money from their friends in exchange for all the food and drinks they want. During the confrontation, Patrick protests that his actions were good for Cheesie's, but Chris does not believe him and fires him and Sara. In his exit interview, Patrick fumes that his best friend fired him over a grilled-cheese contest. The narrator reveals that Patrick and Sara have apologized for their actions and moved on to other jobs. Chris has implemented new rules for his grilled-cheese-eating contest to discourage cheating by customers or staff. No one is cheating in the contest anymore. Mystery Diners: David, Destiney. Targets: Joe, Patrick, Sara.
43	9	"Deliver Us from Evil"	September 11, 2013	YM0409H	1.27
Danny Alberga, owner of Bella Luna Café in Chicago, has been receiving complaints about his delivery service, particularly delivery drivers Mike and Chris. For the first time on the show, the sting is not carried out at the restaurant, but instead in the drivers' cars and at the Mystery Diners' homes. With Mark going undercover as a delivery driver, and Brian, David, and Adriana as customers, Mike is seen running personal errands and taking smoke breaks between deliveries. Despite this, he manages to make Brian's delivery right on time. But Danny mentioned one of the complaints was about deliveries being late, implying that Mike has been late on some deliveries because of it. Meanwhile, Chris charges extra delivery fees, eats delivery food, insults customers who refuse messed-up orders, and displays road rage while driving recklessly. During the confrontation, Danny lets Mike off with a warning and fires Chris. In his exit interview, Chris walks away and yells at a car. The narrator reveals that Chris is working at another restaurant. Mike no longer runs errands during his job. Danny is no longer receiving complaints about his delivery service. Mystery Diners: Mark, Brian, David, Adriana. Targets: Mike, Chris. NOTE: This restaurant was later featured on Guy Fieri's Diners, Drive-Ins and Dives in 2018.
44	10	"Throw Mama from the Restaurant"	September 18, 2013	YM0410H	1.16
Tommy Brower, owner of Gigi Restaurant & Lounge in Philadelphia, is concerned about a recent drop in younger clientele and suspects that his mother/hostess Mariann is discriminating against younger customers. Mystery Diners Miranda, Gregg, and Denise go undercover as a waitress and customers, and learn that, while Mariann has been scolding certain younger customers for inappropriate behavior, waitress Erika is the one behind the discrimination, thinking young people are too cheap; she has Mariann sit older customers outside on the patio, and younger customers inside and at the bar. During the confrontation, Tommy and Mariann fire Erika. In her exit interview, Erika remains unremorseful, wanting richer customers to reward her for her service. Tommy apologizes to his mother when he sees she was trying to repair the damage Erika was causing to the customer. The narrator reveals that Erika is working at another restaurant. Mariann has learned to ease up on younger customers and is still working alongside her son. Young customers are no longer being discriminated against at Gigi's. Mystery Diners: Miranda, Gregg, Denise. Targets: Mariann, Erika.
45	11	"Security Issues"	September 25, 2013	YM0411H	1.07
Dave and Mike Frank, sibling owners of Del Rossi's Cheesesteak Co. in Philadelphia, have been hearing complaints about their security guard "Fury" (who has worked at nightclubs in the past) being too rough with customers and bossy with the staff. Mystery Diners Kiara and Joe go undercover as a customer and a security guard, and confirm that Fury has let his position go to his head; he is seen searching his coworkers' lockers for weapons and treating the restaurant's entrance like a nightclub, not allowing customers in if they just had alcohol (even if they don't seem intoxicated), keeping the restaurant at his own capacity, and doing checks on customers as if he was an airport security officer. He is also endangering lives by not letting drunk people sober up with food before driving home. The team also discovers cashier Matthew taking advantage of Fury by stealing food from the restaurant. During the confrontation, the owners fire Matthew. Matthew, in his exit interview, claims he should get free food for his hard work. The owners then reprimanded Fury and put him on probation. Fury is remorseful for his actions in his exit interview and promises to change his attitude. The narrator reveals that Matthew has apologized and paid for the items he stole. Fury has adopted a more friendly approach in his job. Revenue is up 15% at Del Rossi's. Mystery Diners: Joe, Kiara. Targets: Fury, Matthew.
46	12	"What a Drag"	October 2, 2013	YM0412H	1.24
Bob Berkowitz, owner of Venture Inn in Philadelphia, is hearing complaints from both his regular and cross-dressing customers that the weekly quiz night is rigged and suspects that the 10-time Drag Queen champion Bridgette Jones is cheating, and his manager Joe is helping her since he is in charge of running the show. Mystery Diners Danny and Kiara go undercover as a Drag Queen and a waitress. They discover that Joe isn't behind the rigging. It is actually bartender Scott who is seen stealing the question-and-answer sheets from Joe's office computer and feeding the answers to Bridgette Jones through an earphone. Kiara manages to obtain another copy of the answers with Charles feeding them to Danny, and he and Bridgette Jones tie for first place. They are then given a tiebreaker question, which Scott tries to look up but gets distracted by Kiara, allowing Danny to answer correctly and win the contest. During the confrontation, Bob fires Scott and informs him that Bridgette Jones is not allowed to return. In his exit interview, Scott calls his firing "messed up" and calls Charles a "D-List Sherlock Holmes". The narrator reveals that Scott has found employment elsewhere. Bridgette Jones no longer attends quiz night. Joe has locked his computer with a password, and a different winner has been chosen each week. Mystery Diners: Kiara, Danny. Targets: Joe, Bridgette Jones, Scott.
47	13	"Three's a Crowd"	October 9, 2013	YM0413H	1.11
Marvin Graaf, owner of Falls Taproom in Philadelphia, has been hearing rumors from his best friend Morris that his girlfriend/manager Jessica is rude to customers and doesn't think the bar's rules apply to her since she and Marvin are dating. Mystery Diners Miranda and Kevin go undercover as a waitress and a customer, and discover that while Jessica has a bit of an attitude, Morris is the real problem. He has been drinking too much, spreading lies to Marvin and Jessica in hopes that he will have Jessica to himself, harassing customers and Jessica, and wandering into the kitchen and behind the bar while drunk. During the confrontation, Marvin ends his friendship with Morris and bans him from the bar. In his exit interview, Morris expresses remorse for his behavior and plans to make amends for his misdeeds. Marvin apologizes to Jessica, who will only forgive him if they go out shopping the next day. The narrator reveals that Morris has apologized to Marvin and begun making reparations for his past misdeeds in hopes of regaining Marvin's friendship. Marvin and Jessica have gotten engaged and are planning their wedding for next year. No more drama is happening at Falls Taproom. Mystery Diners: Miranda, Kevin. Targets: Jessica, Morris.

=== Season 5 (2014) ===
No. overall	No. in season	Title	Original release date	Prod. code	U.S. viewers (millions)
48	1	"Tastes Like Chicken"	January 6, 2014	YM0502H	1.19
Mitch Fox, owner and head chef of Source in San Francisco, has been hearing reviews about real meat being served in his vegan restaurant. His main suspects are his manager, Kevin, and cashiers Sydney and Xavier. Mystery Diners Amber, Nate, and Brianna go undercover as customers and a food runner and learn that none of the employees have been serving meat. Still, they see Xavier lying to customers about the food served. Sydney (who is a hardcore vegan) shows intolerance to non-vegan customers by refusing service to those who request real cheese, which is served at the restaurant despite being mostly vegan. In addition, the cook, Tony, is seen bringing in his own alcohol and drinking on the job. Even worse, Xavier eats a fast-food burger in front of the restaurant, despite Source employees being allowed to have one free meal per shift. During the confrontation, Xavier quits his job. In his exit interview, Xavier (from Peru) states that he came to America believing it was the land of the free and maintains that he did nothing wrong by eating a burger during his break. Mitch lets Sydney off with a warning and tells Tony to take time off after Charles breathalyzes him. He states in his exit interview that he plans to return as a better person. The narrator reveals that Xavier is working elsewhere. Sydney is less critical of non-vegans. Tony is working on his alcohol addiction and hopes to return to work. Mitch's customers are no longer being offered meat. Mystery Diners: Brianna, Amber, Nate. Targets: Kevin, Sydney, Xavier, Tony.
49	2	"Fired Up"	January 13, 2014	YM0501H	0.99
Ken Looney, owner of Looney's BBQ in San Leandro, California, asks Charles to investigate his staff when he hears that some of them are pranking customers with Devil's XXX, the restaurant's hottest barbecue sauce, and suspects that his two newest waiters, Matt and Ellory, are behind the pranks. In addition, he's been having a hard time keeping employees recently. Mystery Diners Brianna, Kiel, and William go undercover as customers and a waiter, and reveal that Matt and general manager Mark are behind the pranks. Mark has been setting a bad example by hazing the staff by forcing the waiter with the lowest sales at the end of each week to eat the XXX sauce (which explains why so many new employees have been quitting) while rewarding the waiter with the highest sales with a free beer, which is illegal due to it causing employees to drink on the job, but has zero tolerance for messing with the customers. Meanwhile, Matt pranks the customers by loosening the lids on the sauce bottles and even spiking to-go orders with the XXX sauce. During the confrontation, Ken fires Matt and lets Mark off with a warning, telling the latter that his actions with the XXX sauce could put the restaurant out of business. In his exit interview, Matt remains unremorseful, stating that some of the customers deserved the XXX sauce for the way they treated him. Mark admits in his exit interview that he does have a tough management style, but promises to pull back for Ken. The narrator reveals that Matt found employment elsewhere. Mark has changed his attitude and no longer harasses the staff. The only customers eating the XXX sauce are the ones who order it. Mystery Diners: William, Kiel, Brianna. Targets: Ellory, Matt, Mark.
50	3	"Money on the Side"	January 20, 2014	YM0503H	1.14
Don Dial, owner and head chef of Rocco's Café in San Francisco, hires Charles to investigate rumors that his manager Erik is running unauthorized promotions. Mystery Diners Brianna and Nate go undercover as a waitress and a customer, and see that Erik has been running his own get-rich-quick scheme by charging customers $5 to change their orders, having his friend impersonate Jamie Foxx and selling photos and/or autographs to customers, and selling bogus t-shirts and hats with pictures of Don's grandfather Rocco. Don rants to Charles that he wouldn't even give the Mayor of San Francisco exclusive seating. In addition, busboy Christophe is seen smoking in front of the restaurant with Erik, eating on the job, and lying about not speaking English to get out of work. During the confrontation, Don fires Christophe, who shows remorse in his exit interview. When Erik tries to justify his actions, Don asks whether Erik looks like Alec Baldwin to him and whether Charles looks like Charles Bronson to him before firing Erik. In his exit interview, Erik states that his friend knows Jamie Foxx personally. The narrator reveals that Erik has found employment elsewhere. Christophe has also found new employment and no longer lies about not speaking English. Don's best waitress, Angela, has been promoted to assistant manager. Don is now able to enjoy time with his family and is the only one making promotions for his restaurant. Mystery Diners: Brianna, Nate. Targets: Erik, Christophe. NOTE: This restaurant was previously featured on Guy Fieri's Diners, Drive-Ins and Dives in 2009.
51	4	"Pardon My French"	January 27, 2014	YM0504H	1.04
Philippe Gardelle, owner and head chef of Chapeau! in San Francisco, has been receiving complaints that his wait staff is rude to customers. With Kiel going undercover as a waiter and Brianna, Nate, and Brooke as customers, the Mystery Diners confirm Philippe's suspicion when they catch waiter Renaud being rude to customers and smoking outside. They then catch another waiter, Michael, stealing Renaud's tips and badmouthing him to the customers behind his back. In addition, Philippe's son/busboy Andrew is disrespectful to the wait staff, constantly late to work, and secretly dating hostess Lizzy. During the confrontation, Renaud and Andrew both apologize for their behavior. Renaud admits he has been trying to quit smoking for a while and never intended to be rude to new customers. He had been smoking to alleviate the stress that he went through under Michael and his stunts. Philippe orders him to repay Renaud, then fires Michael. Philippe then lets Renaud and Andrew off with a warning and allows Andrew to continue his relationship with Lizzy on the condition that they keep it outside the restaurant. In their exit interviews, Renaud expresses remorse and promises to change his attitude, while Andrew promises to work harder to make his father prouder of him. The narrator reveals that Michael is working at another restaurant. Renaud has successfully quit smoking and adapted a friendlier approach. Andrew has a better work ethic, and he and Lizzy are keeping their relationship steady. Customer satisfaction is better than ever. Mystery Diners: Kiel, Brianna, Nate, Brooke. Targets: Renaud, Michael, Pascal, Andrew.
52	5	"Oktobertheft"	February 3, 2014	YM0505H	0.80
Cindy Kahl, co-owner of Speisekammer in Alameda, California, has been hearing staff complaints that the "Dirndl Girls" her ex-husband/business partner Peter hired have been getting drunk and soliciting for tips during Oktoberfest. Peter disagrees and thinks they're doing fine. Mystery Diners Hollie and Nate go undercover as a Dirndl Girl and a customer, and discover that Dirndl Girl Danielle is a model employee. Still, two others, Angela and Shayna, not only badmouth Cindy behind her back, but they also drink on the job, charge customers for shots that are supposed to be free while pocketing the money, steal tips, and rig a drink-holding contest to let their friends win. In addition, waiter Tim has been playing Cindy and Peter against each other to try to get out of work early. During the confrontation, Angela and Shayna defend themselves by saying that they were doing what Peter told them to do, but Peter fires them. In their exit interview, the girls claim that Peter hired them to party, then fired them for partying. Peter apologizes to Cindy and plans to confront Tim for his actions. The narrator reveals that Angela and Shayna are working elsewhere. Tim was let off with a warning after apologizing for his actions. Danielle continues to work part-time as a Dirndl Girl. Cindy and Peter are finally seeing eye to eye, and the spirit of Oktoberfest is no longer being tarnished at their restaurant. Mystery Diners: Hollie, Nate. Targets: Shayna, Angela, Danielle, Tim.
53	6	"Grapes of Wrath"	February 10, 2014	YM0506H	0.96
Michael Vujovich, owner and head chef of Bistro Baffi in Burien, Washington, notices that expensive bottles of wine and a valuable painting have disappeared from his restaurant while he was visiting his ill mother in Montenegro. His main suspects are his manager, Ron, and waitress Stacy. With Allison going undercover as a waitress, Julie and John as customers, and Benny as an art admirer, the Mystery Diners reveal that while Stacy is a model employee, Ron has been conducting secret art deals and giving away expensive wine to couples celebrating their wedding anniversaries. Charles has Julie and John each steal a bottle of wine to test the staff's attention spans. Julie manages to make it out with her bottle, but John is caught by waitress Michelle (who was tipped off by Allison), who lets him go after he bribes her to let him take his bottle home. During the confrontation, Michael orders Ron and Michelle to return the money they took from the Mystery Diners, then fires them both while stating that he hates thieves. In her exit interview, Michelle shows remorse and admits that she let her greed get the best of her. The narrator reveals that Michelle has apologized for her actions and found employment elsewhere. Ron still maintains that he did nothing wrong. Stacy has been promoted to head waitress. The staff has been better trained to keep closer watch on the wine and art, which is no longer being stolen. Mystery Diners: Allison, Julie, John, Benny. Targets: Ron, Stacy, Michelle.
54	7	"Greek Tragedy"	February 17, 2014	YM0507H	1.21
Nader Morcos, owner of My Greek and Italian Restaurant in Tacoma, Washington, has been noticing inventory problems and an increase in broken plates. His main suspects are his recently-promoted assistant manager, Steve, the best waitress, Sarah, and the busboy, Travis. Mystery Diners Brianna and Nadine go undercover as a waitress and a customer, and reveal that while Sarah is a model employee, Steve is seen putting too many shots in a traditional Greek appetizer called a saganaki (only calling for one shot), which is a fire hazard, and accepting a bribe from Nadine to conduct the Greek tradition of plate smashing, which Nader discontinued in his restaurant due to inventory costs. In addition, Steve has had Travis put flyers for the former friend's band in to-go orders. Steve and Travis close the restaurant early to party with the rest of the band. After kicking the party out, Nader confronts the duo, forcing Steve to give him the money to make up for the broken plates. Steve says he was going to give Nader the money anyway because he knew the plates would roughly add up to the amount he accepted, but Nader does not believe him, since there have been a lot of broken dishes in the trash that have not been paid for. Travis explains that he was forced to send the flyers, fearing that Steve would fire him if he didn't. Nader fires Steve and gives Travis another chance. Steve is unremorseful in his exit interview, claiming Nader promoted him to assistant manager, then handcuffed him so he couldn't run the restaurant the way it was supposed to be run. The narrator reveals that Steve is working at another restaurant. Travis no longer abuses his position to make extra cash. Sarah has been promoted to Steve's former position as assistant manager. Nader can now enjoy time with his family. Mystery Diners: Brianna, Nadine. Targets: Steve, Travis, Sarah.
55	8	"The Great Divide"	February 24, 2014	YM0508H	1.18
After inheriting some of their staff from the previous owner, James and Brianna Snyder, new husband and wife owners of Sam's Tavern in Seattle, believe there is a feud between the old employees and the new ones. The only employees from the previous ownership are manager Heidi, bartender Chelsea, and cook Reeves. Mystery Diners Nadine and Jason go undercover as a bartender and a customer, and point to Heidi, who is seen ignoring Brianna's instructions, being disrespectful to the new owners and new employees, favoring old customers by reserving tables for them (no reservations are required at the restaurant) and switching the orders so they would be served first, and spreading her negative behavior to Chelsea. Heidi is also shown scolding Nadine for dropping an empty glass, but not Chelsea when she drops a whole plate of food. Meanwhile, Reeves is shown to be welcoming towards new employees. During the confrontation, the owners fire Heidi and let Chelsea off with a warning. In their exit interviews, Heidi says it's in her blood to be a good manager, while Chelsea shows remorse and states Heidi did the same thing to her when she started at the old restaurant. The owners tell Charles they might name their upcoming child after him as thanks. The narrator reveals that Heidi has found employment elsewhere. Chelsea is now getting along with the new employees. Reeves has been promoted to head chef. The owners had their first child (but didn't name him Charles), and employee harmony has never been better. Mystery Diners: Nadine, Jason. Targets: Heidi, Chelsea, Reeves.
56	9	"Mascot Mayhem"	March 3, 2014	YM0509H	0.92
Blaine Cook, owner of Zippy's Giant Burgers in Seattle, has been receiving complaints from customers that his employee Aaron, who works as the costumed mascot Zippy the Yum Yum Burger Boy, is behaving erratically. Mystery Diners Nadine and John go undercover as a cashier and a customer, and discover that Aaron's unemployed friend and roommate "Dopey" Dan has been subbing as Zippy while Aaron visits his mother, who is recovering from a car accident, and runs errands for her. Sometimes, Dan has been drunk during his Zippy favor gigs. During the confrontation, Blaine expresses disappointment in Aaron for having Dan cover his shifts. Aaron explains that he was worried that if he asked for more time off, Blaine would fire him. Charles asks Aaron why he doesn't have Dan run his mother's errands. He answers that he would never trust Dan to run any errands for his mother. Blaine wonders in that case why Aaron would trust Dan to cover his Zippy shifts while he is intoxicated and have him be rude to customers. Blaine considers firing Aaron, but Dan comes to his defense, explaining that he was not expecting Aaron to call him for help today, and persuades Blaine not to fire Aaron for actions that were not his own. Blaine bans Dan from the restaurant and reluctantly gives Aaron another chance. In his exit interview, Aaron is remorseful and admits he should talk to Blaine the next time he has a family emergency. The narrator reveals that Aaron has made amends with Blaine and is the only one wearing the Zippy costume. Dan is still unemployed. Customers are no longer complaining about Zippy. Mystery Diners: Nadine, John. Targets: Aaron, Dan.
57	10	"Paranormal Activities"	March 10, 2014	YM0510H	0.91
Demetri Georgakopoulos, owner of Taverna Mazi in Seattle, believes his staff is getting too carried away with ghost stories and taking customers on "haunted tours" of the attic above the restaurant. His main suspects are his waiter Andy, his waitress Disele, and his bartender Ethan. Mystery Diners John, Lisa, and Hollie go undercover as a waiter, a psychic, and a customer, and reveal that Andy and busboy Edgar are pulling pranks on the staff and customers. Edgar messes with cook Russ by locking him in the walk-in freezer, and they both lock Hollie and her friend in the attic. During the confrontation, Demetri fires Andy and Edgar for their pranks. In his exit interview, Andy shows remorse and says the joke is on him. The narrator reveals that Andy and Edgar have found employment elsewhere. Unfortunately, the restaurant was forced to close down due to increased paranormal activity, but Demetri plans to relocate soon. Mystery Diners: John, Lisa, Hollie. Targets: Andy, Disele, Ethan, Edgar.
58	11	"Coupon Coup"	March 17, 2014	YM0511H	1.02
Aaron Kweskin, owner of The Hangout in Seal Beach, California, has been noticing excess coupon use and believes his employees are abusing the restaurant's coupon promotion. His main suspects are his manager, Jason, and waitresses Nicole, Ally, and Alison. Mystery Diners Shelby and Kiel go undercover as a waitress and a customer, revealing that Jason is not behind the coupon scam but is not doing any work at all; he leaves in the middle of his shift to go surfing. Before this, he is seen changing into his swimsuit in Aaron's office. Meanwhile, Alison is taking advantage of Jason by selling counterfeit coupons to her coworkers printed from a blank roll of register tape, while Nicole has Jason, who is oblivious to the large number of coupons, ring them up so they can pocket the money. During the confrontation, Aaron fires Alison and Jason, but not before Alison presumably recognizes Charles. In her exit interview, Alison states that worse things are going on in the world than a coupon ring. Jason states that while he is unhappy to lose his job, surfing is a big part of his life. The narrator reveals that Jason has apologized for his actions and is now a regular customer at the restaurant. Alison has found employment elsewhere. All other employees involved in the scam, including Nicole, have been terminated and replaced. Aaron is no longer receiving excess coupons. Mystery Diners: Shelby, Kiel. Targets: Jason, Ally, Nicole, Alison.
59	12	"Cover Charge"	March 24, 2014	YM0512H	1.15
David and Petra Vieira, husband and wife owners of Redballs Rock & Roll Pizza in Moorpark, California, have found discrepancies in their pizza supplies during band nights and suspect that their manager, Jesse, is giving away free pizza and drinks to customers during those nights. Mystery Diners Amber and Grant go undercover as a waitress and a customer, along with actor/musician Robbie Rist, who joins the sting as a special guest Mystery Diner, and is a regular performer at Redballs. Jesse is seen instructing waitress Erika to ring up slices of plain pizza as light beer to pay the bands, since they cost the same. Jesse is also seen using his own bouncer to collect money from patrons at the door and inside the restaurant, keeping the money for himself and withholding payment from the bands. One of the bands attempts to go on strike by stealing David's fire truck to make up for not being paid, forcing David to run out and stop them, while he also kicks the bouncer out of the restaurant. During the confrontation, the owners force Jesse to hand over the money he made from unauthorized cover charges, then fire him and Erika, who claims she could not refuse Jesse's proposition. The narrator reveals that Jesse and Erika have found employment elsewhere. Pizza chef Mike, whom the owners bought from Staten Island, has been promoted to Jesse's former position as manager. David and Petra are no longer experiencing discrepancies. Mystery Diners: Amber, Grant, Robbie. Targets: Jesse, Erika.
60	13	"Dinner Drama"	March 31, 2014	YM0513H	1.01
Peter Zappas, owner of the Encore Dinner Theatre in Tustin, California, has been hearing rumors that members of the wait staff are dating the cast members, leading to customer complaints about food being late and the performances not being as good as they usually are. Mystery Diners Amanda, Rob, and John go undercover as an actress, a waiter, and a customer, and reveal that waiter Connor has been stalking and trying to win over actress Hannah, who doesn't return his affection as she has a boyfriend, which she reveals to Amanda, and later to Connor, causing him to sulk over this and disrupt the show during the scenes featuring Hannah and actor Joseph, whom Connor thinks is Hannah's boyfriend. However, Hannah has been taking advantage of Connor's stalking to get special treatment from him, such as free food from the kitchen. In addition, bathroom attendant B.J. has been demanding tips from the customers and eating and drinking on the job. During the confrontation, Peter fires Connor after failing to hear that Hannah doesn't love him back, and B.J. storms out. In their exit interviews, Connor admits he may have taken things too far but insists he was following his heart, while B.J. sees nothing wrong with wanting to be tipped since his coworkers get tipped. The narrator reveals that Connor is working at another restaurant. A less pushy bathroom attendant has replaced B.J. The personal relationships between the wait staff and the cast members are no longer affecting the dinner service or stage performances. Mystery Diners: Amanda, Rob, John. Targets: Connor, Hannah, B.J..

=== Season 6 (2014) ===
No. overall	No. in season	Title	Original release date	Prod. code	U.S. viewers (millions)
61	1	"Mexicali Blues"	April 7, 2014	YM0601H	1.10
Esdras Ochoa and Javi Fregoso, owners of Mexicali Taco & Co. in Los Angeles, have been hearing rumors that customers are ordering off-menu items. They suspect that their cook, Rafael, is going rogue again after being caught causing the same problem before. Mystery Diners Brenda and Grant go undercover as a cashier and a customer, and discover that while Rafael is using the kitchen to make food for the staff without the owners' permission, he is not behind the off-menu orders. It is actually cashier Aissa who has been running a cash-only side business with her grandmother by selling off-menu items using the restaurant's tortillas, which the owners get from Mexicali, Mexico. During the confrontation, Aissa states that she was delivering the customers' food, but the owners fired her. In her exit interview, Aissa says she and her grandmother plan to buy a food truck together and will earn more than she did at her former employers. The narrator reveals that Aissa has found employment elsewhere. Her grandmother apologized for her involvement and stated that Aissa is a good girl. Rafael continues to be a loyal employee. All of the restaurant's tortillas are accounted for, and off-menu items are no longer being served to customers at Mexicali Taco & Co. Mystery Diners: Brenda, Grant. Targets: Rafael, Aissa.
62	2	"Trimming the Fat"	April 14, 2014	YM0602H	0.87
Chris Patterson, owner of Spring Street Smoke House in Los Angeles, is concerned about the loss of fat trimmings, which he sells to butcher shops and other restaurants, and believes that his prep cooks, Will and Albert, and busboy Charlie, are carelessly throwing the trimmings away. Mystery Diners Grant and Amber go undercover as a waiter and a customer and discover that Albert has been lazy about cutting the brisket. Charlie is caught stealing Chris's to-go supplies. Will is behind the loss of the trimmings; he puts them in an ice chest and sells them to an unknown business, keeping the money for himself. During the confrontation, Will protests that the trimmings are no big deal, while Charlie claims that he needed the to-go supplies for a family party, but Chris has had enough and fires them both. In their exit interviews, Will is shocked to be fired over fat, while Charlie shows remorse. Albert apologizes for improperly cutting the meat and claims he was tired. Chris suspends Albert for a week and gives him another chance by retraining him upon his return. The narrator reveals that Will is working at another restaurant. Charlie made reparations for stealing the to-go items. Albert has been retrained and no longer wastes meat. The fat trimmings are no longer being stolen. Mystery Diners: Grant, Amber. Targets: Will, Charlie, Albert.
63	3	"Food Truck Fiasco"	April 21, 2014	YM0603H	0.97
Peter Crest, owner of Roll'n Lobster Food Truck in Los Angeles, has been noticing extra mileage and not enough products being sold in his new truck, and suspects that his new food-truck drivers, Brian and Kevin, have been using it for personal errands. For the first time on the show, Charles and his team conduct the sting from a mobile command center. While Charles and Peter follow Brian and Kevin, Mystery Diners Shelby and John go undercover as customers with John ordering food from Brian and Kevin and Shelby from Peter's other drivers, Buck and Anthony. Peter is right to be concerned: Brian and Kevin run a stop sign, leave their location early, and operate a soul-food side business in Silver Lake (a part of town where Peter does not have a food license) with their friend Elijah. In addition, during their location work, Kevin is rude to difficult customers. Peter kicks Elijah out of the truck, then brings Brian and Kevin to Charles' mobile command center for the confrontation. Brian claims the side business was a lobster-by-day/soul-food-by-night promotion for Peter's business. Peter disagrees, stating that both Brian and Kevin were poaching his business by using his license to sell their own food. Peter fires both men, and they walk away after turning in their gear, while the camera crew is ordered to stop following them as they argue. Charles states that it's not a total loss, as Buck and Anthony followed the rules, and Peter can surely find more employees like them. The narrator reveals that Brian and Kevin have failed to start their own food-truck business. Buck and Anthony are now in charge of both trucks. Peter is now selling out of lobster rolls on both his food trucks every day. Mystery Diners: Shelby, John. Targets: Buck, Anthony, Brian, Kevin, Elijah.
64	4	"Charitable Donations"	April 28, 2014	YM0604H	0.90
Doug Guller, owner of Pelons Tex-Mex Restaurant in Austin, Texas, has been noticing discrepancies in food and alcohol sales. Mystery Diners Holly and Justin go undercover as a waitress and a customer, and discover that Doug's entire staff, led by manager Anthony and waiters John and David, are responsible for the discrepancies by soliciting donations for a real cancer charity called St. Baldrick's (which Doug sometimes donated to) in Doug's name with raffle tickets with plans to pool their own money to give $1,000 to the winner, which Justin proved by donating $100 for David to shave his head to be similar to Doug's shaved head. During the confrontation, Anthony accepts responsibility for his actions, and Doug lets him off with a warning, along with John and David. The narrator reveals that the staff only focus on their jobs. Doug was so moved, he continues to donate a portion of the restaurant's proceeds to several charities. Mystery Diners: Holly, Justin. Targets: Anthony, David, John. NOTE: This is the first episode in which something good is actually found.
65	5	"Bad Poets Society"	May 5, 2014	YM0605H	0.87
Danny Parrott and Jonathan Insley, owners of Old School Bar and Grill in Austin, Texas, are concerned about not turning a profit on their weekly poetry night, which was started by their manager Brian. Mystery Diners Samantha and Justin go undercover as a waitress and a customer, revealing that Brian has been giving away free drinks and appetizers to customers and poets who attend poetry night. Even worse, one of the poets performs a vulgar poem, causing customers to leave. In addition, waitress Cassie gives her friends free food using Brian's flyers. During the confrontation, the owners fire Brian and suspend Cassie for a week. Brian's exit interview still has him claiming that poetry night was good for the restaurant's business. The narrator reveals that Brian has apologized for his actions and is making amends while still supporting the Austin poetry community. Cassie is no longer giving food away. Danny and Jonathan have discontinued poetry night and are no longer losing money. Mystery Diners: Samantha, Justin. Targets: Brian, Cassie.
66	6	"Family Ties"	May 12, 2014	YM0606H	0.86
Carl Zapffe, owner of Bakehouse Restaurant and Bar in Austin, Texas, fears that a feud between his son/waiter Adam and head waitress Ali is threatening the harmony of his restaurant, leading to several employees quitting. Mystery Diner Holly goes undercover as a waitress, and confirms this. Ali scolds Adam for being late (even though he wasn't) and calls him vulgar insults while not smiling at anyone. Adam also reveals that he doesn't want to take over the restaurant when his father retires. The team also discovers that baker Benny has been using the restaurant's supplies to bake gluten-free brownies to sell at a farmer's market. He has also been taking advantage of Ali and Adam's feud to cover up his side business. During the confrontation, Carl fires Benny and lets Ali off with a warning, ordering her to change her attitude and to smile more at work. Adam apologizes to his father and admits he can't take over the business. Carl allows his son to quit and pursue his own career and lets him know he will be welcomed back anytime. In their exit interviews, Benny says he will bake his brownies elsewhere, while Adam says that even though taking over the restaurant is not in his best interest, he feels bad that his father chose Ali over him. Still, he plans to figure out what's out there for him. The narrator reveals that Benny has found employment elsewhere. Ali has changed her attitude and is hoping that Carl will promote her to assistant manager. Adam is now going to college part-time and studying to become a doctor. Employee harmony has returned to Bakehouse Restaurant and Bar. Mystery Diners: Holly. Targets: Adam, Ali, Benny.
67	7	"Fraternal Disorder"	May 19, 2014	YM0607H	1.01
Rick Engel, owner of Uncle Billy's Brew and Que in Austin, Texas, has been noticing kegs of Green Room, one of his best privately-brewed beers, missing and hearing rumors about this beer showing up at fraternity and sorority parties at nearby universities. Rick's main suspects are his manager, Trevor, the waiter Kevin, and the bartender Matt, since all three are former frat brothers. Mystery Diners Vanessa and Robin go undercover as a waitress and a customer, catch Kevin drinking on the job, scam Trevor into stealing food orders, and sell a keg of Green Room to his frat brothers with Matt's help. During the confrontation, Matt and Kevin tell Rick that the whole scam was Trevor's idea, and Kevin shows him the text messages to prove it. After Trevor's phone rings when Rick orders Kevin to call it, Rick fires the trio. Trevor's exit interview reveals his anger at Matt and Kevin for their plan to get him fired. The narrator doesn't reveal what happened to the trio afterwards. Still, he does mention that Rick has replaced them with a new manager, waiter, and bartender with no college-fraternity connections and has been distributing his beer to other local venues. Mystery Diners: Vanessa, Robin. Targets: Trevor, Kevin, Matt.
68	8	"Raw Deal"	May 26, 2014	YM0608H	1.17
Sylvia Heisey, owner of Beets Café in Austin, Texas, has seen two of her secret recipes from her raw-food menu online and suspects that her employees are selling her recipes. Mystery Diners Holly, Paul, and Robin go undercover as a waitress and customers, and prove Sylvia correct; head prep cook William sells Robin one of Sylvia's recipes for $60. To make matters worse, waitress Taylor is seen lying to customers about the benefits of raw food and claiming to be the restaurant's co-owner. Another waitress, Lacy, is caught forging ticket orders so the kitchen staff will pay for her mistake orders; Sylvia has a policy stating that if employees make mistake orders, they must pay for them, which has led to heated arguments between the staff. During the confrontation, William and Taylor try to defend themselves, but Sylvia fires them and gives Lacy another chance. William is remorseful during his exit interview, while Taylor claims she was fired for encouraging healthy eating. The narrator reveals that William has found employment elsewhere. Taylor has personally apologized for her lies. Lacy and the rest of the staff no longer have to pay for mistake orders. The only place you can enjoy Sylvia's food is at Beets Café. Mystery Diners: Holly, Paul, Robin. Targets: William, Taylor, Lacy.
69	9	"Scorpion Sting"	June 2, 2014	YM0609H	0.96
Paul Hymas, owner of Nacho Daddy in Las Vegas, has been noticing discrepancies in the expensive tequila and scorpions used in his "Scorpion Shots." Mystery Diners Peter and Andy go undercover as a barback and a customer, and discover that bartender Gino has a serious gambling addiction; he has been hustling customers, holding unauthorized drinking contests involving the Scorpion Shots, and giving away free food and drinks to pay off his gambling debts, with the help of waiter Jeremy. To make matters worse, manager Amber hasn't returned from picking her daughter up from volleyball practice. During the confrontation, Paul fires Gino and Jeremy. In their exit interviews, Gino remains confident that he will make more money by gambling, while Jeremy expresses remorse. The narrator reveals that Gino has checked into a gambling addiction recovery center. Jeremy has found employment elsewhere. Amber was let off with a warning and has now hired a babysitter for her daughter. Paul has hired a new bartender. Paul is no longer missing tequila and scorpions. Mystery Diners: Peter, Andy. Targets: Gino, Jeremy, Amber.
70	10	"Life's Not a Beach"	June 9, 2014	YM0610H	TBA
Marty Tunnell, owner of Barefoot Bob's Beach Bar & Gaming in Las Vegas, has been hearing employee complaints about his recently-hired manager, Patricia, and customer complaints about not being able to reserve the VIP room. Mystery Diners Hollie, Andy, and John go undercover as a bartender, a liquor sales representative, and a customer, and reveal that bartender Liz is behind the complaints; angry over still being a bartender and not being promoted to manager, she badmouths Patricia behind her back, ignores orders to remove her boyfriend and his friends from the VIP room so paying customers can enjoy it, gives away free drinks, and steals from Marty's expensive private cigar stash to further spoil her boyfriend's gang. At one point, Liz's boyfriend burns a pillow with a cigar, and she attempts to erase the evidence by throwing the pillow in the trash. Aside from eating a customer's food to cope with her stress, Patricia is shown to be a model employee, as she declines to make an unauthorized vodka deal with Andy. During the confrontation, Liz claims she should have been promoted to manager. Charles disagrees, citing how rude she is to customers and her failure to deal with her boyfriend's actions. Marty then fires her and lets Patricia off with a warning. In her exit interview, Liz expresses remorse and hopes her boyfriend is ready to help pay her bills now that she's out of a job. The narrator reveals that Liz has found employment elsewhere and broken up with her boyfriend. Patricia is doing better at her job. Profits for Marty's VIP room have doubled. Mystery Diners: Hollie, Andy, John. Targets: Patricia, Liz.
71	11	"Magic Hassle"	June 16, 2014	YM0611H	TBA
Rosele Napoli and her fiancé Peyman Zabeti, owner and head of P.R. and marketing of Sergio's Italian Gardens in Las Vegas, are concerned about a feud between their longtime pianist Shanti and their recently-hired magician Adam. Mystery Diners Hollie and John go undercover as a waitress and a customer and discover that waiter Jason is behind the feud because he believes Shanti and Adam are taking his tips. He pits them against each other by spreading lies to both of them about one trash-talking the other behind their backs, and scamming customers into giving him more tips, which he lies about giving to Adam, who is not allowed to accept tips. As Rosele returns to the restaurant to round up Adam, Shanti, and Jason for the confrontation, Adam botches a magic trick, which breaks several plates and sends Shanti slipping. During the confrontation where Jason's actions were revealed, Shanti and Adam get angry at Jason for setting them up. Jason tries to defend his actions, blaming Shanti and Adam for stealing his tips. Charles doesn't believe Jason and points out that he started the feud between them in the first place by spreading lies to both of them for his own amusement. Rosele fires Jason for his actions. In his exit interview, Jason is unremorseful, stating that Shanti and Adam were only entertaining while they were fighting. The owners decide that to limit future feuds, Shanti and Adam should have separate work schedules. Adam states in his exit interview that, even though he knows Shanti never insulted him in the first place, they are better off as solo performers. The narrator reveals that Jason no longer works in the restaurant industry. Adam and Shanti have put aside their differences and now work as a team. All of the employee tension has disappeared from the restaurant. Mystery Diners: Hollie, John. Targets: Adam, Shanti, Jason.
72	12	"Heavy Lifting"	June 23, 2014	YM0612H	TBA
Larissa Reis and Andrew Bick, owners of Protein House in Las Vegas, have been experiencing discrepancies with their expensive protein powder supply. Their main suspects are their manager, Aundrey, and the newest baristas, Nayeli and Sarah. Andrew is unable to join the sting due to family issues. Mystery Diners Kelli and Andy go undercover as a barista and a customer, and discover that Aundrey has instructed the baristas to put less protein powder in the smoothies so he can give some customers protein powder. He has also been recruiting customers for his training business and giving them free food as an incentive. To make matters worse, Sarah is rude to overweight customers by pushing them to order salad and insulting them behind their backs. During the confrontation, Aundrey accuses Charles of setting him up, but Larissa fires him and lets Sarah off with a warning. In their exit interviews, Aundrey says he will take his clientele elsewhere, while Sarah says the confrontation was her wake-up call to do better. The narrator reveals that Aundrey no longer works in the restaurant industry. Sarah has changed her attitude and no longer insults customers. All of Larissa and Andrew's protein powder is accounted for. Mystery Diners: Kelli, Andy. Targets: Aundrey, Nayeli, Sarah.
73	13	"The Italian Job"	June 30, 2014	YM0613H	TBA
John Arena, co-owner of Metro Pizza in Las Vegas, is concerned about a feud between his pizzeria and bakery, two different kitchens in the same restaurant, as well as rising costs in the bakery. His main suspects are his general manager, Albert, head pizza chef, Tony, and head baker, Amy. Mystery Diners Arielle and Andy go undercover as a waitress and a customer, and reveal that Albert and Tony are behind Amy's stress; she notices that flour is missing, and Albert blames her for it, while she accuses Tony. Following the argument, she is seen throwing skillets in the bakery kitchen and sabotaging Tony by throwing a customer's takeout order in the trash, forcing him to comp the customer's order. Albert is seen accepting bribes from employees and customers to get special treatment, including kicking paying customers out of their seats, giving them free desserts, calling in a fake order to steal cakes from the bakery, and stealing the bakery's flour to help his sister's restaurant, with Tony's help. During the confrontation, Tony recognizes Charles, and he and Albert both quit their jobs. In his exit interview, Albert is remorseful but explains that his sister was opening a restaurant and he was helping her because that's what family does. The narrator reveals that Tony and Albert have found employment elsewhere. Amy was let off with a warning and no longer fights with the pizzeria. Peace and harmony have returned to Metro Pizza. Mystery Diners: Arielle, Andy. Targets: Albert, Tony, Amy.

=== Season 7 (2014) ===
No. overall	No. in season	Title	Original release date	Prod. code	U.S. viewers (millions)
74	1	"Going to the Dogs"	July 30, 2014	YM0701H	TBA
Jeff Levitt and Dave Martin, owners of Shades Oceanfront Bistro, a dog-friendly restaurant in San Diego, discover discrepancies in their chicken and beef supply, and suspect that their head chef, Clint, is responsible for these losses. Mystery Diners Corinne and Seth go undercover as a waitress and a customer, along with Charles' dog Otto, the show's first-ever Mystery Diner dog. The team reveals that Clint has been stealing both meat and replacing them with dog food as revenge against the owners for letting the dogs be fed "people food". To make matters worse, recently-hired manager Alisha has been running a dog-sitting side business and is oblivious to the theft. In addition, she has been giving away free pupsicles and allowing waitress Genevieve and the rest of the staff to bring their dogs to work. During the confrontation, the owners fire Clint and Alisha. In his exit interview, Clint expresses remorse about the thefts but insists that dogs should only eat dog food. The narrator reveals that Clint and Alisha have found employment elsewhere. Genevieve was given a warning and no longer brings her dog to work. Jeff and Dave are no longer having discrepancies at Shades Oceanfront Bistro. Mystery Diners: Corinne, Seth, Otto. Targets: Clint, Alisha, Genevieve.
75	2	"Cocktail Fail"	August 6, 2014	YM0702H	TBA
Sarra Costello, owner of The Compass in Carlsbad, California, fears that a rivalry between her flair bartenders Levi and Steve is causing tension, negative reviews, and an increase in broken bottles. Mystery Diners Chelsea and Amanda go undercover as a waitress and a customer, and discover that Levi and Steve are both being played, waitress Andrea has been stealing tips from both bartenders, posting negative online reviews from her cell phone under the name "Angie W", stealing alcohol, and breaking empty bottles to pit them against each other, hoping they would both be fired. During the confrontation, Sarra fires Andrea after the latter argues with Charles in defense of her actions. Andrea remains unremorseful in her exit interview, stating that she had been trying to alleviate the waitstaff's frustrations, that she thinks Sarra made a big mistake by firing her, and that the waitstaff's tips will suffer because she kept Levi and Steve and booted her. When Charles tells Levi and Steve of Andrea's scam, they decide to end their rivalry, realizing that they had been acting out of frustration and should have suspected Andrea of sabotaging them. The narrator reveals that Andrea has found employment elsewhere. Levi and Steve have made amends and become good friends. Sarra has implemented a tip-sharing policy for her staff and is no longer missing alcohol or getting negative reviews about The Compass. Mystery Diners: Chelsea, Amanda. Targets: Levi, Steve, Andrea.
76	3	"Promotion Sabotage"	August 13, 2014	YM0703H	TBA
Isabel Cruz and Todd Camburn, owners of Barrio Star in San Diego, are disputing over which waiter they should promote to manager for their next restaurant in San Francisco: Cal or Mark. In addition, Todd has been getting complaints from customers about Mark messing up their orders. Mystery Diners Chelsea, Seth, and Shane go undercover as a waitress and customers, and discover that, while Cal is a model employee (besides voiding Seth's dessert without the manager's approval), waitress Jessica has been taking advantage of the owners' dispute by stalking Mark because she still has feelings for him after their first date and doesn't want him to leave the restaurant. When Mark tells her to leave him alone, Jessica retaliates by throwing something at him and deleting his customers' orders, making her the direct cause of their complaints about Mark. During the confrontation, the owners fire Jessica, embarrassed by her behavior. They then let Mark off with a warning, ordering him not to mix personal relationships with business. In her exit interview, Jessica insists that she was getting back at Mark for humiliating her. Mark hopes he can do a better job now that Jessica is gone. The narrator reveals that Jessica has found employment elsewhere. Cal has been promoted to manager and transferred to Isabel and Todd's new San Francisco restaurant. Mark has apologized and is next in line for a management promotion. The owners have implemented a no-dating policy in their restaurant, and all the drama has disappeared from Barrio Star. Mystery Diners: Chelsea, Shane, Seth. Targets: Cal, Mark, Jessica.
77	4	"Dueling Food Trucks"	August 20, 2014	YM0704H	TBA
Rival San Diego food-truck owners Marko Pavlinovic (owner of Mangia Mangia Mobile) and Brett Doogan (owner of Food Junkies Catering) work together with Charles to investigate revenue loss in both their trucks. With Seth going undercover as an employee at Crepes Bonaparte, another competing truck, and Corrine and Shane as customers, with Corrine ordering food from Food Junkies Catering and Shane from Mangia Mangia Mobile, the Mystery Diners reveal that Mangia Mangia Mobile employees David and Jose, and Food Junkies Catering employees Jacob and Stephen have gotten carried away with the rivalry, turning a friendly competition into a feud with the rival employees slinging insults at each other. Jacob is trying to drive customers away from the other trucks with a megaphone, in favor of Food Junkies Catering, prompting David to steal the megaphone angrily. Jose is also shown poaching customers with free samples at the other trucks while Jacob plants a large fish beneath Mangia Mangia Mobile beneath David and Jose, then catches him and steals his pants. To make matters worse, the feud spills over to the other trucks when an employee from Mastiff Sausage Company steals Marko's POS system with the Mangia Mangia Mobile e, and the Food Junkies Catering employees are blamed. The last straw comes for the owners when they see Jose locking the Food Junkies Catering employees in their own truck and disrupting the entire food court by starting a water gun assault with David. While Jose quits upon recognizing Charles during the confrontation, Marko fires David, Brett fires Jacob, and gives Stephen another chance. David states in his exit interview that he will get a job at a restaurant that isn't on wheels. Stephen states that almost getting fired was scary, and he will be professional moving forward. The narrator reveals that Jose, David, and Jacob have found employment elsewhere. Stephen has apologized and made amends with Brett. Marko and Brett have ended their rivalry and are no longer having problems. Mystery Diners: Seth, Corinne, Shane. Targets: Justin, David, Jose, Spumoni, Jacob, Stephen, Gerado.
78	5	"Trademark Trouble"	August 27, 2014	YM0705H	TBA
After fighting off a lawsuit over the rights to his signature sandwich, the "Torpasta", Damien Devine, owner of Devine Pastabilities in San Diego, suspects that his manager Seth and bartender Brittany, who both work full-time at the restaurant, are stealing and selling his creation, and are also responsible for inventory discrepancies involving missing signature stands and bread. Mystery Diners Amanda, Shane, and Andy go undercover as a waitress, a customer, and a restaurant executive, revealing that while Brittany lacks respect for Damien's creativity, she is a model employee. Seth had stolen the Torpasta recipe. He tried to sell a rip-off of it called the "Torpatty" as his own and tricked head chef Alfredo into helping him with the scheme, passing it off as a special. During the confrontation, Alfredo is spared when he learns of Seth's scam and returns to his job. Damien fires Seth for his actions. Seth states in his exit interview that he will sell another Torpasta ripoff called the "Roll Patty". The narrator reveals that Seth has found employment elsewhere. Alfredo has been promoted to kitchen manager. Damien is no longer missing inventory items. Mystery Diners: Amanda, Shane, Andy. Targets: Seth, Brittany, Alfredo.
79	6	"Customer Concerns"	September 3, 2014	YM0706H	TBA
Larry Herz, owner of 730 South in Denver, feels that either some of his regular customers have become too entitled or the wait staff has pushed them to get special treatment in exchange for bigger tips. His main suspects are his servers, Andy and Katrina, and regular customers Anthony, Sherry, Jim, and Irene. Mystery Diners Ariel and Conner go undercover as a waitress and a customer, and discover that the regulars weren't misbehaving and were actually fine with sitting in different locations of the restaurant. They see Katrina trying to stash a bag of hash browns for Anthony's usual against Larry's rules and berating hostess Mimi for removing a "Reserved" sign from Jim and Irene's table to seat Conner. He refuses to move to another table until Katrina bribes him by offering to comp half his meal. During the confrontation, Katrina claims that Jim and Irene were upset when their usual tables were taken. Larry points out that they weren't and were fine with sitting in a new location. Charles explains that the customers are angry with Katrina because she picked a fight with Mimi for doing her job. Katrina gets angry and quits her job before Larry can fire her. In her exit interview, she knows she's a good waitress. Larry praises Andy for his good work. The narrator reveals that Katrina has found employment elsewhere. Andy continues to be a model employee. Larry is no longer hearing complaints about his regular customers. Mystery Diners: Ariel, Conner. Targets: Andy, Katrina, Anthony, Sherri, Jim & Irene.
80	7	"Heavy Metal Mess"	September 10, 2014	YM0707H	TBA
Leah Dillon and Garret Stewart, owners of The Toad Tavern in Littleton, Colorado, have been noticing losses in food and alcohol sales, and think Leah's son/assistant manager Justin has become too entitled and focused on his dream of becoming a rock star. Mystery Diners Ashley, Dustin, and Andy go undercover as a waitress, a customer, and a music promoter, and confirm this; Justin is unable to answer questions about renting the bar out for a party and decides to show Ashley one of his band's songs during his shift. He also kicks the band that was meant to play that night out, just so he and his band can play to impress Andy with their thrash metal; this unsurprisingly drives customers away. Also, cook Richie, who is a member of Justin's band, is seen assisting him in kicking the other band out. In addition, waitress Christine has been taking advantage of Justin's inexperience and her coworkers' frustration that he is unqualified to be a manager by giving her friends free food and alcohol. During the confrontation, the owners fire Christine. In her exit interview, a tearful Christine maintains she did nothing wrong and believes Justin should have been fired for his negligence. As for Justin, Leah, and Garrett, they demote him to barback and promise that his band will get on stage the right way if they can be serious about their jobs. The narrator reveals that Christine is working at another restaurant. Justin has accepted his demotion and is more serious about his job while continuing to pursue his dream of becoming a rock star. The Toad Tavern is no longer having discrepancies. Mystery Diners: Ashley, Dustin, Andy. Targets: Justin, Richie, Christine.
81	8	"Vicious Cycle"	September 17, 2014	YM0708H	TBA
Lou Scileppi, owner of SliceWorks in Denver, notices a decrease in bicycle-delivery sales and an increase in delivery complaints. Mystery Diners Taylor and Jamie observe the delivery service from chase vehicles and find out that Lou's delivery man, Chris, has been juggling his delivery job with a bicycle tour he neglected to tell Lou about. He even has his passengers hold his delivery food. He then offers Taylor a ride, and she bribes him to let her buy the pizza he is delivering. Meanwhile, Lou's other deliveryman, Jason, makes his deliveries early and on time, but is seen riding his bike recklessly by running a red light and nearly being hit by a car; he is also seen displaying road rage, prompting a driver to call the restaurant to complain about Jason's recklessness. During the confrontation, Lou fires Chris and suspends Jason for a week. Chris says in his exit interview that he prefers his bike-tour job, while Jason promises to be more careful. The narrator reveals that Chris was also terminated from his bike-tour job after Lou contacted Chris's other boss and informed him of his scheme. Jason has apologized and is now more careful while making deliveries on his bike. Lou is no longer receiving complaints about the delivery service. Mystery Diners: Taylor, Jamie. Targets: Chris, Jason.
82	9	"Secret Pairings"	September 24, 2014	YM0709H	TBA
Peter and Delinda Fatianow, husband and wife owners of Indulge Bistro and Wine Bar in Highlands Ranch, Colorado, have been noticing discrepancies in wine and cheese costs. Mystery Diner Taylor goes undercover as a waitress and discovers that bartender Jeremy has been overpouring expensive wine for customers. Even worst, manager Jessica and waiter Scot have been running a bimonthly wine-tasting-event side business, before which Jessica is seen accepting an unauthorized wine delivery and stealing expensive bottles of wine and cheese from the restaurant for the event, while sending Scot out to buy sheep cheese, which the restaurant does not sell. During the confrontation, the owners fire Jessica and Scot after they hand over their latest pay from their side business. In their exit interviews, neither is remorseful, claiming it was for the good of Peter and Delinda's business, and Jessica adds that by firing Scot, they had lost their valuable source of cheese knowledge. The narrator reveals that Jessica and Scot were unsuccessful at opening their own wine bar. Jeremy apologized upon being reprimanded and now serves just the right amount of wine. Peter and Delinda are no longer missing cheese and wine at Indulge Bistro and Wine Bar. Mystery Diners: Taylor. Targets: Jessica, Jeremy, Scot.
83	10	"Vintage Scams"	October 1, 2014	YM0710H	TBA
Jimmy Nigg, owner of Rockabillies in Arvada, Colorado, becomes concerned about a decline in food and alcohol sales, especially during his restaurant's summer vintage car show, in addition to fewer cars showing up for the show. He suspects his manager, Chad, and servers Rachel and Sabrina are responsible for these losses. Mystery Diners Amber and Kyle go undercover as a waitress and a customer, and see Chad running a get-rich-quick scheme that is not only hurting Jimmy's business, but also forcing customers to pay an entry fee to look at vintage cars and inviting food vendors to operate in the parking lot, which explains the drop in food and alcohol sales. He also involves Sabrina in his scams by claiming they are for Jimmy's benefit. The team also sees Rachel ripping off the bar by selling customers beer from her own supply. During the confrontation, Jimmy fires Chad and Rachel and suspends Sabrina for a week, making her promise to let him know about any suspicious behavior in the future. In his exit interview, Chad maintains that his actions were for the good of the car show since the restaurant doesn't sell the food the vendors sell. The narrator reveals that Chad and Rachel have found employment elsewhere. Sabrina now reports all suspicious behavior to Jimmy. Jimmy's classic car show revenue has returned to normal. Mystery Diners: Amber, Kyle. Targets: Chad, Rachel, Sabrina. NOTE: This restaurant was later featured on Paramount Network's Bar Rescue, hosted by Jon Taffer in 2023.
84	11	"Partner in Crime"	October 6, 2014	YM0711H	TBA
Ondrea Faillace, co-owner of the Black Rose Tavern in Los Angeles, has been noticing multiple cash register mistakes and inventory discrepancies, and suspects that her new business partner Frank is behind these losses, making him the first restaurant owner on the show to appear as a suspect. Her other two suspects are waitress Carrie and Salem, a musician in Ondrea's Starving Musician's Program. Mystery Diners Amanda and Rob go undercover as a waitress and a tequila sales representative, and show Ondrea that Frank has been taking her generosity for granted by conducting his own scams; he is seen making unauthorized deals with brewing companies by covering up his crimes in using the cash register to delete inventory orders, then blaming Carrie for stealing the money, stealing Salem's free meals, and promoting unauthorized music events under the guise that it was for her charity. During the confrontation, Frank claims the restaurant was losing money because of the free food she gives the musicians, but Ondrea fires him and says she is ending their business partnership. In his exit interview, Frank maintains he did nothing wrong, arguing it was a good deed for Ondrea's business. The narrator reveals that Frank's unauthorized events were cancelled. Carrie was cleared of making any mistakes and continues to be a valuable employee. Ondrea's staff and Salem continue to participate in her charity. Mystery Diners: Amanda, Rob. Targets: Frank, Carrie, Salem.
85	12	"Café Coup"	October 6, 2014	YM0712H	TBA
Anthony and Anna Sinopoli, new husband and wife owners of Anthony's Café Aldente in Studio City, California, are concerned about the staff from the previous ownership practicing old policies. Mystery Diners Annalisa and Kiel go undercover as a waitress and a customer, and reveal that manager Julia, who believes she should own the restaurant now, attended the auction when the restaurant was put up for sale six months earlier but was outbid by Anthony and Anna, which has left her fuming. She manipulates the staff, particularly servers Sarah and Wendy, to keep practicing the former policies, sells unauthorized off-menu items (which Wendy is reluctant to do), and has customers sign a petition to force Anthony and Anna to give the restaurant to her. Julia also allows an accordion player named Smokey, who worked for the previous owner, to continue performing in the restaurant without the current owners' permission (Anthony did not like Smokey's music, so he fired Smokey), furthermore, annoying the customers by soliciting tips from them; Julia also gives him free food. Adding to the problems is head chef Rafet (the previous owner's brother), who is unwittingly involved in her schemes. During the confrontation, Julia recognizes Charles and defends herself, believing that Anthony and Anna are unqualified to be the owners. Charles points out that Julia's selfish behavior makes her the unfit one, and Anna fires her. In her exit interview, Julia says that Anthony and Anna will not last long in the restaurant, and she will buy it someday. The narrator reveals that Julia has been unsuccessful in her continued attempts to purchase the restaurant. Rafet was let off with a warning. The staff continues to work for Anthony and Anna and no longer practices old policies. Mystery Diners: Annalisa, Kiel. Targets: Julia, Rafet, Sarah, Wendy, Smokey.
86	13	"Daddy's Girl"	October 13, 2014	YM0713H	TBA
Joe and Fran Cavasino, husband and wife owners of Geppino's Sicilian Kitchen in Moorpark, California, have been hearing customer complaints of theft. Joe's main suspect is waiter McCall "Mac", who is dating their daughter/waitress, Brianna. But, doubtfully, Fran notes that Mac is extremely popular with female patrons. Mystery Diners Shelby and Destiney go undercover as a waitress and a customer and discover that the real thief is elderly busboy Hal, who also drinks on the job. Mac, however, is seen letting a female diner kiss him and agreeing to go out with Shelby after telling Brianna he had to study. During the confrontation, Fran fires Hal. In his exit interview, Hal claims that Mac framed him. Joe fires Mac for being a "scumbag" as Brianna breaks up with Mac. Brianna tells her parents that they did the right thing. Mac states that he and Brianna weren't exclusive. The narrator reveals that Mac has been unable to reconcile with Brianna. Hal is now working at a supermarket. Theft is no longer happening at Geppino's Sicilian Kitchen. Mystery Diners: Shelby, Destiney. Targets: Mac, Hal.

=== Season 8 (2014–15) ===
No. overall	No. in season	Title	Original release date	Prod. code	U.S. viewers (millions)
87	1	"Employee Discount"	October 13, 2014	YM0802H	TBA
Andy Hasroun, owner of 55 Degree Wine Shop and Link-n-Hops Restaurant in Los Angeles, has been noticing discrepancies at both his wine shop and restaurant and believes they are somehow related. His main suspects are Link-n-Hops bartender Jose and 55 Degree Wine cashier Max, who both work full-time. Mystery Diners Rob and Destiney go undercover as a bartender and a customer and reveal that Jose has been using his employee discount to buy beer from Max, which is also sold at the restaurant. Jose is also seen giving Max a free meal. In the restaurant, Jose charges customers full price, under-rings the sales, sells the beer he bought from Max, pockets the difference, and then later splits the money with Max. During the confrontation, Andy fires them both. In their exit interview, they see nothing wrong with using their employee discounts to make extra money for themselves. The narrator reveals that Jose and Max have found employment elsewhere. Andy no longer sells the same liquor at both businesses and no longer has discrepancies. Mystery Diners: Rob, Destiney. Targets: Jose, Max.
88	2	"Poaching Profits"	October 20, 2014	YM0803H	TBA
Lenny Bent, owner of Cookin' with Lenny Smokehouse in Chatsworth, California, has been noticing missing supplies and a decline in his catering business, and fears that someone on his staff is using his supplies to operate a side catering business. Mystery Diners Amanda and Kiel go undercover as a waitress and a customer. Also joining the sting is Charles's consultant and special guest Brooke Williamson, who is also a restaurateur and has had employees steal from her. Before the sting, Brooke reports seeing waitress Grace and manager J provide poor customer service. During the sting, Grace continues to prove herself a terrible employee, struggling to handle a customer with an accent and making a rude remark about that customer. The team reveals that J and cook Carlos have been running a side catering business, unknown to Lenny, called Delicious Dish, and using Lenny's recipes. J is seen poaching Lenny's employees, including a reluctant Grace, to help him and Carlos with the business, and poaching Kiel by lying that the minimum number of people per party that Lenny is willing to cater is 50, when it is actually 30. The team then follows J and Carlos to one of their gigs and uses a drone to capture the action. During the confrontation, J and Carlos claim they were trying to help the restaurant out, but Lenny fires them. In their exit interviews, J and Carlos state they hope Charles is proud of himself for getting two innocent employees fired. The narrator reveals that J and Carlos were unsuccessful at starting their own catering company. Grace was also terminated and has since apologized for her behavior. Lenny is no longer missing supplies, and his catering revenue has doubled. Mystery Diners: Amanda, Kiel, Brooke. Targets: J, Grace, Carlos.
89	3	"Missing Memorabilia"	October 20, 2014	YM0804H	TBA
Michael and Berenice Thomas, husband and wife owners of Fenders Moto-Cafe and Brew Pub in Portland, Oregon, have been missing some of their valuable motorcycle memorabilia, as well as donated motorcycle parts, which they use to support a local motorcycle enthusiast charity. Mystery Diners Shelby, Leslie, and Daniel go undercover as a waitress and customers, and discover that manager Joseph and waiter Sprague have been selling off the memorabilia and promoting a fake charity to make money for themselves. Joseph is also seen improperly dealing with a mother and her son when they disobey the restaurant's policy against sitting on the motorcycles set up for decoration, leading them to leave without paying for their meal. Charles tests the staff's attention spans by having Leslie steal a motorcycle part, which she manages to walk out with without getting caught. During the confrontation, Michael threatens to turn Joseph and Sprague over to the police unless they confess to their scheme. They do, and he fires them. In their exit interviews, Joseph and Sprague, although the former is relieved that Michael and Berenice didn't call the police, both agreed that their careers in the restaurant business have come to an end. The narrator reveals that Joseph and Sprague have found employment elsewhere. All of the memorabilia has been recovered, and customer donations are at an all-time high at Fender's Moto-Cafe. Mystery Diners: Shelby, Leslie, Daniel. Targets: Joseph, Sprague.
90	4	"Robbed Kabobs"	October 27, 2014	YM0805H	TBA
Ghaith and Tiffany Sahib, husband and wife owners of Dar Salam in Portland, Oregon, have been noticing a significant loss in their supplies and suspect that their employees are involved with an Iraqi food cart that operates near the restaurant. Mystery Diners Brianna and Jamie go undercover as a waitress and a customer, and prove the owners correct as their manager Aleck and prep cook Aníbal have been supplying the cart with the owners' food, including a Dar Salaam-exclusive dish called "mahshi." Another prep cook, Hector, is caught stealing fresh onions and potatoes for personal use. During the confrontation, the owners fire Aníbal and Aleck. Aleck's exit interview has him claiming that the Iraqi food cart was a missed opportunity for the owners and that multiple vendors will eventually surround the restaurant. The narrator reveals that Aleck and Aníbal have found employment elsewhere. Hector was also fired and has paid for the stolen onions and potatoes. The Iraqi food cart has gone out of business. Food and supplies are no longer missing at Dar Salam. Mystery Diners: Brianna, Jamie. Targets: Aleck, Hector, Aníbal.
91	5	"Behind the Eight Ball"	November 3, 2014	YM0806H	TBA
Kent Lewis, owner of Uptown Billiards Club in Portland, Oregon, is concerned that his social media expert, Sunny, is not doing his job, bringing in more customers. With Amber going undercover as a waitress, the Mystery Diners find out that Sunny has been letting his friends drink and play pool for free using coupons meant for paying customers, and that bartender Bri has been hustling customers with the help of a pool shark pretending to be drunk. During the confrontation, Kent fires Bri and terminates his contract with Sunny. In her exit interview, Bri denies ever hustling anyone. The narrator reveals that Bri has found employment elsewhere. Sunny still maintains his innocence. Kent's business is back to normal. Mystery Diners: Amber. Targets: Sunny, Bri.
92	6	"Thanksgiving Thievery"	November 10, 2014	YM0801H	TBA
Kristian Krieger, owner of Tavern on Main in El Segundo, California, suspects that his employees are stealing donations meant for his Thanksgiving food drive. Mystery Diners Shelby and Kiel go undercover as a waitress and a customer and prove Kristian correct: busboy Jean is seen stealing a can of peaches to eat on his break, and waitress Courtney is seen stealing donated items like wine and cupcakes, thinking people experiencing homelessness do not need them. Manager Joel has been oblivious to the theft and is seen ringing up larger-than-instructed discounts, as Courtney instructed in an apparent effort to boost her tips. During the confrontation, Kristian fires Courtney and lets Joel off with a warning. In their exit interviews, Courtney maintains she did nothing wrong and thinks that the drive was designed to make her look bad, while Joel states that Courtney almost getting him fired will motivate him to be more attentive. The narrator reveals that Courtney is working at another restaurant. Jean was also let off with a warning and has replaced all the peaches he stole. Joel now pays close attention to every detail at the restaurant. Kristian says his current food drive is shaping up to be his best one yet. Mystery Diners: Shelby, Kiel. Targets: Joel, Courtney, Jean.
93	7	"Food Cart Catastrophe"	November 17, 2014	YM0807H	TBA
Rod and Linda Gramlich, husband and wife owners of À La Carts Food Pavilion in Portland, Oregon, have been hearing complaints from their tenants about their recently-hired on-site manager, Sabrina. With Amber going undercover as an employee at Burger Guild, one of the food carts, the Mystery Diners confirm that Sabrina has let her position go to her head as she is seen charging the vendors a $10 cleaning fee and pocketing the money, getting a free haircut in place of the fake cleaning fee from Salon Bucci, the only non-food cart, and instructing custodian Marvin to steal soda and napkins from Azul Mexican Taqueria for an unauthorized burger vendor whom she leases a vacant cart to, keeping the money for herself. Mike, the owner of Burger Guild, does not fall for Sabrina's cleaning fee scam, but she extorts him by threatening to call the health department on him. He later confronts her and the other burger vendor, since there is supposed to be only one burger vendor in the same lot, sparking a dispute among the three, including Marvin, that almost leads to a physical fight. Rod breaks up the argument and brings Sabrina and Marvin back for the confrontation, during which the owners fire them both. Sabrina is unremorseful in her exit interview, saying that the lot will not run well without her. The narrator reveals that Sabrina and Marvin have found employment elsewhere. There are no more complaints from the vendors. Mystery Diners: Amber. Targets: Sabrina, Marvin.
94	8	"Local Celebrities"	November 24, 2014	YM0808H	TBA
Rashad and Kiauna Floyd, husband and wife owners of Amalfi's Italian Restaurant in Portland, Oregon, have been hearing customer complaints that waiters Justin and Patrick are going too far with the digital videos the owners produce to promote the restaurant, leading to their newfound fame getting in the way of their work. Mystery Diner Amber goes undercover as a waitress, and confirms this; Justin and Patrick are seen showing Amber their videos. But even worse, manager Michael feeds their egos by letting them leave mid-shift to get supplies for an unauthorized music video. During the confrontation, the owners fired Michael and put Justin and Patrick on probation for three months. The narrator reveals that Michael still champions the marketing campaign. Justin and Patrick continue to perform in the digital shorts with the owners' consent after completing their job responsibilities. Business at Amalfi's has never been better. Mystery Diners: Amber. Targets: Justin, Patrick, Michael.
95	9	"Memorabilia Mayhem"	December 1, 2014	YM0809H	TBA
Michael Gelfo, owner of Rock Island Cafe in Honolulu, has been noticing a drop in his restaurant's memorabilia sales. His main suspects are his manager, Maribelle, and waitresses Quiyamma and Gabriella, all of whom work full-time at the restaurant. Mystery Diners Jordan and John go undercover as a waitress and a customer, and reveal that, while Quiyamma is a model employee, Gabriella has been running her own get-rich-quick scheme by bringing worthless items from home and scamming customers into buying them, passing them off as collectibles and pocketing the money with a little help from Maribelle, who signs Don Ho's name on a ukulele to make it seem genuine. Meanwhile, Maribelle has been buying Michael's items such as a vintage toaster that Charles brought in specifically for the sting (the restaurant's employees are allowed to purchase the memorabilia, but they have to wait a few weeks after they become available to give the customers the first chance at them), then selling them to customers for inflated prices so she can pocket the difference. During the confrontation, Maribelle and Gabriella blame each other for the scam, but Michael has had enough and fires both of them. Gabriella states in her exit interview that there's no way the memorabilia can be authenticated. The narrator reveals that Maribelle and Gabriella have found employment elsewhere. Quiyamma has been promoted to assistant manager. Michael's memorabilia sales are back to normal. Mystery Diners: Jordan, John. Targets: Maribelle, Quiyamma, Gabriella.
96	10	"Deep Sea Delivery"	December 8, 2014	YM0810H	TBA
Angie Runyan, owner of Cha Cha Cha Salsaria in Honolulu, has been hearing rumors of an unauthorized boat delivery service. Mystery Diners Jordan and David go undercover as a waitress and a customer, and discover that the general manager, Jesus, and the cook, Matt, are behind the delivery service. However, except for implementing an additional $10 delivery charge to pay Jesus' friend, who owns the boat, they are not pocketing any money for themselves. In addition, waitress Leilani has been stealing food from the expediting station and giving it to her boyfriend for free. During the confrontation, Angie fires Leilani. In her exit interviews, Leilani claims that giving away free food is what all servers do. Then, Angie is moved by Jesus's plea when he explains how the delivery service has made more money for the restaurant, so she allows him to continue it, though she is reluctant. Jesus and Matt are remorseful in their exit interview and remain determined to prove their delivery service will work. The narrator reveals that Leilani has found employment elsewhere and has paid Angie for the stolen food. Jesus and Matt have made amends while their boat delivery service is on a trial run, and Angie has not regretted it. Mystery Diners: Jordan, David. Targets: Jesus, Matt, Leilani.
97	11	"Hawaiian Club Crashers"	December 15, 2014	TBA	TBA
Madeleine Noa, general manager of the Hawaii Yacht Club in Honolulu, has been receiving complaints about non-members sneaking into the members-only club, particularly during private luaus, leading some members to cancel their memberships. Mystery Diners Kylie and Jamie go undercover as a dancer and a non-member attempting to sneak in, and show Madeleine that two of her waitstaff, Tony and Jordan, have been sneaking their friends into members-only events, allowing them to consume food and drinks meant for members, and stealing clothes from the club's gift shop to disguise their friends. Meanwhile, waiter Blake is seen chasing away two non-members attempting to sneak in through the loading dock, while Jamie is turned away by doorwoman Linda. However, the non-members Blake chased away, who had infiltrated the club by boat, without getting caught, are revealed to be Tony's friends. During the confrontation, Madeleine fires Tony and Jordan. Jordan is remorseful in her exit interview, but claims she saw nothing wrong with letting her friends into the club. The narrator reveals that Tony and Jordan have found employment elsewhere. Blake and Linda were commended for their loyalty and promoted to assistant managers. Members are the only people enjoying the Hawaii Yacht Club. Mystery Diners: Kylie, Jamie. Targets: Tony, Jordan, Blake, Linda.
98	12	"Fyre on the Beach"	December 29, 2014	TBA	TBA
Allen Farinas, owner of Shore Fyre Grill in Honolulu, has been noticing discrepancies in sales and believes that his employees are treating the restaurant like a social club, along with the employees of Moku Surf Rentals next door. He contacts Charles to investigate not only his restaurant, but also the surf shop. Mystery Diner Jordan goes undercover as a cashier and points to big problems with cashier Keli'i, who often interacts with Derek, a cashier at the surf shop, by trading food for surfing-gear rentals, and often leaves in the middle of his shift to go surfing (he is not permitted to take breaks because the employees all work only five-hour shifts). Another cashier, Tiffany, comes to work late and intoxicated, and Derek is forced to cover for her (which he has not done before and has no clue how to run the POS system) while she naps and Keli'i surfs. During the confrontation, Allen fires Keli'i and Tiffany. In her exit interview, Tiffany maintains she did nothing wrong and did not have a hangover. Charles advises Allen to talk to the surf shop's owner about what happened. The narrator reveals that Keli'i and Tiffany have found employment elsewhere. Derek was let off with a warning by the owner of the surf shop and is now only focused on his job. Sales have never been better at Shore Fyre Grill. Mystery Diners: Jordan. Targets: Keli'i, Tiffany, Derek.
99	13	"Bad Credit"	January 7, 2015	TBA	TBA
Chai Chaowasaree, owner and head chef of Chef Chai in Honolulu, has been noticing multiple voided checks. Mystery Diners Jordan and David go undercover as a waitress and a customer, and discover that manager Minnie has been forcing her waitress friend Sara to void out customer bills for personal gain and lying to the waitstaff that the POS system is down to force customers to pay with cash so she can keep the money for herself. Minnie and Sara have also been badmouthing each other to the other employees. During the confrontation, Sara says she had been letting Minnie void checks under her code, which Minnie denies. Chai fires them both and orders them to leave the restaurant before he calls the police. Sara's exit interview has her regretting that she trusted Minnie and became friends with her in the first place. The narrator reveals that Minnie and Sara had ended their friendship. Chai has hired a new manager. Voided tickets are no longer a problem. Mystery Diners: Jordan, David. Targets: Sara, Minnie.

=== Season 9 (2015) ===
No. overall	No. in season	Title	Original release date	Prod. code	U.S. viewers (millions)
100	1	"Bowling for Dollars"	February 4, 2015	TBA	N/A
Bryan Alpert, owner of Corbin Bowling Center in Tarzana, California, has been noticing discrepancies in food sales and hearing complaints about rowdy customers. With Kendall going undercover as a bartender, the Mystery Diners discover that manager Michael has been filming rowdy customers led by the wild Waleed, who assures him that his videos will promote Corbin Bowl. Waleed uses inattentive head bartender Taylor's car for one video and throws a bowling ball through one of its windows, as discovered by Charles' private investigator Eliot, which led to Waleed being put on the board. During the sting, Waleed is seen going behind the front desk and making vulgar jokes over the bowling center's P.A. system, while Taylor gives Waleed and his friends food without ringing it up. On the lanes, Waleed's gang drives a family next to them away with their foul language, causing the father to demand a refund. Soon after, the gang disrupts a league game, and Michael threatens to call the police on them, but they ignore him and then film Waleed performing a very dangerous stunt. Bryan bans Waleed and his gang from the bowling center and brings Michael and Taylor to the control room for the confrontation, during which he fires them both. Taylor rants in her exit interview about losing her job for helping Waleed try to become an Internet sensation and her car window being broken. The narrator reveals that Michael has taken full responsibility for his actions. Taylor has found another job and is still trying to collect reparations from Waleed for her broken car window. Bryan has hired a new manager. Sales are up, and rowdy people are no longer disturbing the bowling center. Mystery Diner: Kendall. Private Investigator: Eliot. Targets: Michael, Taylor, Waleed.
101	2	"Deli Drama"	February 11, 2015	TBA	0.95
Lenny Rosenberg, owner of Lenny's Deli in Los Angeles, has been hearing complaints that his new head baker, Brittany, is making desserts the way she wants, not the way customers requested. Charles' private investigator, J.R., reveals that in his investigation, Brittany was fired from her previous three jobs, and her previous employers told him that she had an attitude and was unstable. Mystery Diners Kiel and Kendall go undercover as a couple planning their wedding and confirm her actions when they order a brown chocolate wedding cake, only to have her make a white chocolate wedding cake instead. In addition, with Shelby going undercover as a baker's assistant, the team finds that Brittany has also been badmouthing the other bakers. They also discover that elderly catering manager Barry has been lying that the cash registers are broken, pocketing the money, and overcharging customers for catering orders. Meanwhile, after Kiel and Kendall tell Brittany she did not make the cake the way they wanted, she loses her temper and starts throwing the cake around the bakery. During the confrontation, Lenny fires Brittany and strongly advises Barry to retire. In her exit interview, Brittany states that she plans to start her own bakery so customers will appreciate her creativity. The narrator reveals that Brittany has applied for several baking positions but remains unemployed. Barry has accepted his retirement, but still maintains his innocence. Lenny has promoted one of his more-trusted bakers to Brittany's former position as head baker. Customers are getting their desserts the way they want them. Mystery Diners: Shelby, Kiel, Kendall. Private Investigator: J.R. Targets: Brittany, Barry.
102	3	"Very Bad Bosses"	February 18, 2015	TBA	1.12
Joleen, co-owner of an undisclosed restaurant in Culver City, California, contacts Charles to do a reverse sting on her ex-husband/business partner Tony, who has been abusing his position by making offensive comments about the waitstaff's physical appearances and stealing their tips. Before the sting, Charles's private investigator, Eliot, reports that Tony is in a secret relationship with hostess Yasmeen, whom he promoted to assistant manager. For the first time on the show, actual restaurant employees appear as Mystery Diners: Joleen's waitstaff, Josiah and Charlotte. With Amanda going undercover as a customer, the team sees Tony ridiculing Charlotte for her appearance, eating in the kitchen, selling foie gras (which is illegal in California due to being considered animal cruelty) and having head chef Eric cook it, smoking inside the restaurant, and pocketing the waitstaff's tips from large parties. In addition, Yasmeen threatens to fire Charlotte unless she rings up large parties' checks as banquet checks. During the confrontation, Tony tells Charles to stay away from his business and storms out with Yasmeen, while Joleen lets Eric off with a warning. The narrator reveals that the ban on foie gras in California has been lifted between the filming and airing of the sting. The restaurant has closed down, forcing the employees to find employment elsewhere. Joleen has ended her partnership with Tony and plans to open another restaurant in the future. Mystery Diners: Amanda, Josiah, Charlotte. Private Investigator: Eliot. Targets: Tony, Yasmeen, Eric. NOTE: This was the first episode where the restaurant's name was not used, at the owner's request.
103	4	"Barrel of Monkeys"	February 25, 2015	TBA	0.99
Damian Doffo, owner of Doffo Winery in Temecula, California, has been noticing expensive wine barrels missing and believes that his tasting room manager, Chris, is responsible, since he has full access to the entire property, as well as his vineyard workers, Ricardo and Sean. Before the sting, Charles's private investigator, Patrick, places tracking devices inside the empty barrels. During the sting, he buys a tagged barrel from a furniture maker named Julio in Murrieta, concluding that the barrels are being secretly sold to him. Mystery Diners Humberto, Jamie, and Kendall go undercover as a vineyard worker and customers, and discover Ricardo stealing empanadas (the employees are allowed to have the food on their lunch break, but they have to buy them from Damian's sister) and conducting a scam with Sean and Chris that involves selling the barrels to Julio. Ricardo and Sean are also seen racing Damian's golf carts around the vineyard, throwing water balloons at each other, and crashing the carts. Patrick catches Sean, who flees, while Damian brings Ricardo and Chris in for the confrontation. He fires them and orders them to tell Sean he is fired, too. Chris, in his exit interview, says he'll let Damian cool down before apologizing to him. The narrator reveals that Chris, Ricardo, and Sean have found new employment in the area. The authorities contacted Julio and have just finished making reparations for his involvement in the scam. Wine barrels are no longer being stolen. Mystery Diners: Humberto, Jamie, Kendall. Private Investigator: Patrick. Targets: Chris, Ricardo, Sean, Julio.
104	5	"Red Hot Mess"	March 4, 2015	TBA	0.88
Sonny and Sage Sehmi, husband and wife owners of Hot Red Bus in Alhambra, California, have been hearing reviews about Indian food being served and their restaurant being open on Sundays, when it is supposed to be closed. With Kendall going undercover as a food blogger, the Mystery Diners report that Sonny's brother Pip, whom he fired two months earlier for being lazy, has been running a makeshift, reservation-only Indian restaurant called "The Wandering Elephant" inside Hot Red Bus with Sonny's manager Raj and head chef Koushik that involves bootleg versions of the restaurant's upcoming special sauce, as confirmed by Charles' private investigator Patrick. They are also seen collecting money to fund the pop-up restaurant by having Raj solicit the customers for $65 or more. During the confrontation, Sonny takes the money collected from the latest pop-up, and he and Sage fire Raj and Koushik and ban Pip from the restaurant. In their exit interviews, Raj and Koushik claim they were fired because of a family feud, while Pip counters that Sonny bringing the special sauce was like him going back to England to say he invented barbecue sauce. The narrator reveals that Raj and Koushik were unsuccessful at starting their own restaurant. Pip's parents scolded him, and he apologized to his brother. Sonny and Sage are preparing to open an Indian pop-up restaurant with their special sauce. Mystery Diners: Kendall. Private Investigator: Patrick. Targets: Pip, Raj, Koushik.
105	6	"Private Chef Sting"	March 11, 2015	TBA	1.03
Nico Santucci, owner of Capo's Italian Cuisine in Las Vegas (from "My Brother's Keeper"), contacts Charles again to help him with a personal problem at his new home in Los Angeles. Nico's relationship with his brother Dominick has improved since the first incident three years earlier. His new problem is that his guests have had things stolen from them during private dinner parties and other events at his house. His main suspects are his maid, Olivia, and her boyfriend Richard, Nico's personal chef/house manager. For the first time on the show, the restaurant owner appears as a Mystery Diner; Nico attends his dinner party during the sting, while his assistant, Mella, watches the action in the control room with Charles. Before the sting, Charles's private investigator, Patrick, reports seeing Richard sell something at a pawn shop. Mystery Diners Rob and Kiel go undercover as a waiter and a party guest, revealing that Olivia has been secretly stealing money from Nico's guests (which Richard did not know about). At the same time, Richard is seen urinating in the bushes, then touching a guest's food without washing his hands, popping pills (medicine he was prescribed following a car accident he was in from two weeks earlier), and spitting in Nico's food. During the confrontation, Nico fires both of them. The narrator reveals that Richard and Olivia have ended their relationship. Some of Nico's employees at Capo's Italian Cuisine have been transferred to his house. Nico's guests are no longer being robbed during his house parties. Mystery Diners: Nico, Rob, Kiel. Private Investigator: Patrick. Targets: Richard, Olivia.
106	7	"Mystery Wedding"	March 18, 2015	TBA	1.05
Kristy Oustalet and Sarah Worsley, owners of Moviesets in Slidell, Louisiana, are concerned about their props being stolen and/or damaged following each event at their prop-house-turned-event-center. Charles sends in Mystery Diners Rob and Ingrid to pose as a couple planning their wedding. Charles' private investigator, Eliot, has also rented a valuable prop from event manager Kayla, who is not authorized to rent it. The Mystery Diners discover that Kayla has not only booked the venue for two photo shoots and the fake wedding simultaneously, with assistant event manager Tony helping with the setup, but she has also been accepting kickbacks from a caterer named Scott, who has a shaky reputation. With the three events going on at the same time, Kayla's greed gets the best of her when an argument breaks out among her, Ingrid, Rob, and one of the photographers. During the confrontation, the owners fire Kayla. In her exit interview, Kayla fumes that Charles had no right to come in and tell her how to do her job. The narrator reveals that Kayla has attempted to start her own event-planning business with Scott. Tony was also terminated and has apologized for his involvement. Kristy and Sarah are no longer missing props, and there are no more double bookings. Mystery Diners: Ingrid, Rob. Private Investigator: Eliot. Targets: Kayla, Tony, Scott.
107	8	"Repeat Offender"	March 25, 2015	TBA	1.18
Cara Benson, owner of two New Orleans restaurants, Toast and Tartine, is concerned about an unhealthy competition between them. She is surprised when Charles and his private investigator, Patrick, find out that one of her Toast waitresses is Dee Dee, a former waitress at R&O's Restaurant whom Charles had previously busted two years earlier (as seen in "All in the Family"). With Shelby going undercover as a waitress at Toast and Nicole as a waitress at Tartine, the Mystery Diners discover that both restaurants have been selling each other's meals at the instruction of Toast manager Pat and Tartine manager Tiffany, who also involves Tartine cook Richard. In addition, Tiffany is seen sabotaging Toast by placing large prank to-go orders and letting them spoil. Dee Dee has turned over a new leaf since the last time Charles saw her and is doing everything she can to be a good employee, even going as far as to make Patrick a ham tartine, which is not on the menu. During the confrontation where Dee Dee remembers Charles, Cara fires Tiffany and lets Pat off with a warning. Dee Dee accuses Charles of trying to keep her unemployed, telling him that she did nothing wrong this time. Charles agrees, but he tells her that the only reason she is in this situation again is that she did not disclose her termination from her first encounter with him in her application. In the end, Cara suspends her for a month. The narrator reveals that Tiffany claims that her actions were in Tartine's best interest. Pat promised Cara that he would never go off-menu again. Dee Dee found a new part-time job during her suspension and continues to make up for her previous actions. The rivalry between Cara's restaurants has ended, and business at both of them has never been better. Mystery Diners: Shelby, Nicole. Private Investigator: Patrick Targets: Pat, Tiffany, Dee Dee, Richard.
108	9	"Too Many Tourists"	April 1, 2015	TBA	1.34
Roland Adams, owner of Marigny Brasserie in New Orleans, has been noticing an influx of rowdy tourists in his restaurant and a decrease in sales following a recent heart attack, and suspects that his general manager, Jonathan, is involved. Charles' private investigator, Eliot, reports that he ran into a woman named Jamie, who does not work for Roland and is running an unauthorized promotion for the restaurant, offering two-for-one drinks and tab discounts. Mystery Diner Nicole goes undercover as a waitress and reveals that recently-hired bartender Janeline is responsible for the influx and is in cahoots with Jamie, her friend, while Jonathan has been oblivious to her actions. Intoxicated customers, who heard about the promotion, are seen starting fights in the restaurant, leading to the police being called. Janeline is also seen charging non-customers $5 to use the bathroom and pocketing the money. The police nearly arrest Roland for the rowdy, drunken tourists. Still, Charles comes to his aid and explains that the drunks started the chaos, and they are arrested and removed as one of the police officers also recognizes Charles. During the confrontation, Roland fires Janeline. In her exit interview, Janeline claims that she was trying to improve the business when a police officer arrested her. Roland tells Jonathan he will deal with him the next day. The narrator reveals that Janeline was not charged with any crimes and has found employment at another bar. Jamie was given a restraining order prohibiting her from coming within 50 feet of the restaurant. Even though Jonathan was not involved in Janeline and Jamie's scam, his position was given to someone else. Roland's health improved, and the rowdy tourists have kept their distance from his restaurant. Mystery Diners: Nicole. Private Investigator: Eliot. Targets: Jonathan, Janeline, Jamie.
109	10	"The Spoils of Victory"	April 8, 2015	TBA	1.03
Daniel Victory, owner of Victory in New Orleans, has been noticing discrepancies in high-end alcohol and hearing reviews that his bartenders have been serving off-menu drinks he did not authorize, which might be the signature drinks of other bars around New Orleans. Because of this, he's also concerned that his signature drinks are being served at other restaurants and bars around town. His main suspects are his manager, Eliot, and head bartender, Katie. Charles' private investigator, Patrick, reports that Katie works at another bar and has been serving one of Daniel's signature cocktails, the Gas Mask. To make matters worse, Charles reports that just after his team finished setting up the hidden cameras in the bar, they had captured footage of an unidentified drifter sleeping in the VIP room. With Ingrid going undercover as a waitress, not only do the Mystery Diners reveal that Eliot knows the drifter and has been charging him rent to let him sleep in the bar, but he has also been throwing unauthorized parties in the VIP room when local celebrities visit, giving away free food and drinks, charging customers to join in, and pocketing the money. Also, Katie is seen serving drinks that Daniel's competitors make in his bar. During the confrontation, Daniel fires Eliot and Katie. In their exit interviews, Eliot claims he got fired for bringing celebrities and more customers into the bar, while Katie states that her job is to serve any drink a customer asks for. Daniel thanks Charles by creating a signature drink named after him. The narrator reveals that Eliot and Katie still maintained they had done nothing wrong but found employment elsewhere. The unidentified drifter was not seen since the taping of this sting. No more off-menu drinks are being served, and you can only get the Gas Mask at Victory. Mystery Diners: Ingrid. Private Investigator: Patrick Targets: Eliot, Katie.
110	11	"Cabin Fever"	April 15, 2015	TBA	1.17
Glen and Susan McIntyre, husband and wife owners of Gateway Restaurant and Lodge in Three Rivers, California, near Sequoia National Park, have been noticing discrepancies in food and alcohol costs and hearing complaints from their guests about theft and late-night parties taking place. Their main suspects are their night manager, Marino; the recently-hired waiter, Dean; and the maid, Siri. Charles' private investigator Eliot reports that he has seen Dean interacting with two women, who are not guests at the hotel, early in the morning, and throwing away trash bags filled with empty alcohol containers. Mystery Diners Kendall and Jamie go undercover as a maid and a guest, confirming that Marino, Dean, and Siri have been responsible for the parties. Siri and Dean have also been texting each other to let each other know when they can steal alcohol and toiletries from the guests. Marino is also seen lying to actual guests, claiming he will shut down the parties, and supplying the parties with the restaurant's food. The trio even let the guests drive the owners' new limo under the influence of alcohol (when the limo was brought to the hotel in the first place to prevent drinking and driving). Dean escapes into the woods, but the owners bring Marino and Siri back to the control room for the confrontation, during which they fire them and order them to tell Dean if they see him that he's fired too. In his exit interview, Marino states that the party was an appreciation party for all the hotel employees. The owners thank Charles by allowing him to stay at the hotel for free. The narrator reveals that Marino and Siri have found new employment in the area. Dean did not return to pick up his final paycheck. There are no more missing supplies or late-night parties happening at the lodge. Mystery Diners: Kendall, Jamie. Private Investigator: Eliot Targets: Marino, Siri, Dean.
111	12	"Train Robbery"	April 22, 2015	TBA	1.03
David Wilkinson, owner of Fillmore and Western Railway in Fillmore, California, is concerned about food discrepancies and rumors of unauthorized passengers during his train's dinner theater service. While using the caboose as the control room, with David covering up that it is under renovation, Charles uses two remote-operated drones. He has his private investigator, J.R., on the train going undercover as a passenger, and Mystery Diner Shelby as a waitress. The team reveals that passenger service manager Jessica has been sneaking her friends onto the train past inattentive conductor Will. That head chef, Bryan, has been stealing meat to help his brother save his failing diner in Santa Clarita. During the confrontation, David fires Jessica and Bryan and orders them to get off his train and walk home with their friends. The narrator reveals that Jessica has moved away from Fillmore. Bryan and his brother have apologized for their actions and are making reparations. David has also fired Will and replaced him with a more competent conductor. There are no more discrepancies or stowaways on his railway. Mystery Diners: Shelby. Private Investigator: J.R. Targets: Will, Bryan, Jessica. NOTE: This is the first episode since the season aired in which the private investigators did no investigative work related to the problems.
112	13	"Dusting for Prints"	April 29, 2015	TBA	N/A
After noticing almost $4,000 missing from her office safe, Keeli Lisack, owner of Fuzion in Huntington Beach, California, suspects that one of her managers is responsible since they're the only ones with access to her office. With help from Charles' private investigator Patrick, and Mystery Diners Kiel and Kendall going undercover as a custodian and a customer, the team finds the trouble when a fingerprint match through Patrick's scanner confirms that waiter Zach has been stealing from her with restaurant/comedy club manager John's help by hiding a camera in an office plant to tape Keeli entering the combination to her safe so they can steal from her later. During the confrontation, when John denies that his voice matches the one heard during the robbery, Patrick states that he has the technology to compare the voices. Keeli fires John and Zach and gives them three days to pay back the money they stole from her, or she will turn them over to the police. John's exit interview still has him claiming that he has a familiar-sounding voice while pointing out that he did not steal anything from Keeli. The narrator reveals that the authorities contacted John and Zach and have made a deal to pay back the stolen money. Keeli's other two managers, Alfred and Adam, continue to be valuable employees. Keeli's safe is no longer being broken into, and no more money is being stolen from Fuzion. Mystery Diners: Kiel, Kendall. Private Investigator: Patrick Targets: Alfred, Adam, John, Zach.
113	14	"Millions Gone Missing"	May 20, 2015	TBA	N/A
Mystery Diners counts down the series' Top 10 greatest moments in catching employee theft involving stolen food, alcohol, supplies, and money: At #10 is "The Tipping Point."; At #9 is "Thanksgiving Thievery."; At #8 is "Fraternal Disorder."; At #7 is "Barbecue Blues."; At #6 is "Heavy Lifting."; At #5 is "Going to the Dogs."; At #4 is "Sleeping on the Job."; At #3 is "Chop Shop."; At #2 is "My Brother's Keeper."; At #1 is "Catch of the Day."
114	15	"Sneakiest Schemes"	May 27, 2015	TBA	N/A
Mystery Diners counts down the Top 10 craziest schemes caught on videos, from operating unauthorized businesses to raising money for bogus charities, having people pose as celebrities, faking injuries, and even creating fake employees.: At #10 is "Catering on the Side."; At #9 is "Night Shift."; At #8 is "Fyre on the Beach."; At #7 is "Vicious Cycle."; At #6 is "Getting a Leg Up."; At #5 is "Money on the Side."; At #4 is "Food Truck Fiasco."; At #3 is "What a Drag."; At #2 is "Where's the Beef?"; At #1 is "Cooking the Books."

=== Season 10 (2015) ===
No. overall	No. in season	Title	Original release date	Prod. code	U.S. viewers (millions)
115	1	"Partner Problems"	June 3, 2015	TBA	N/A
Jamie Alba, co-owner of Sisley Italian Kitchen in Sherman Oaks, California (from "Cooking the Books," which has since relocated to Valencia), contacts Charles again to help determine if he should invest in a failing Torrance restaurant called Industry Sports Bar & Grill. Industry's owner James Mercado sees nothing wrong at first, but with Mystery Diners Kendall and Kiel going undercover as a waitress and a customer, the team discovers that the restaurant is infested with cockroaches and dead mice, the staff buys prepared frozen food from supermarkets since James cannot afford to pay his vendors, nobody checks the expiration dates on their food supplies, and head chef Jeff quit the night before the sting, with dishwasher Greg filling in for him and the waitstaff washing the dishes; the waitstaff also cleans the bathrooms as James also cannot afford janitorial staff. After seeing all these problems, Jamie refuses to invest in the restaurant. After Jamie leaves, James vows to Charles that he will fix them as Charles suggests that James get a bank loan, and he agrees. The narrator reveals that Jamie and James have gone their separate ways. James' loan application was rejected, forcing his restaurant to shut down and his staff to find employment elsewhere. James has vowed to continue fixing his problems and reopen his restaurant next year. Mystery Diners: Kendall, Kiel. Private Investigator: Patrick. Targets: Ryely, Brittany, Greg. NOTE: This is the first and only episode in which no employees were confronted.
116	2	"Art Show Sting"	June 10, 2015	TBA	N/A
Patricia Smith, curator of an undisclosed pop-up Culver City, California art gallery, has been getting charged more than what was budgeted for by her caterer, Oscar, at the end of each event. Mystery Diners Brianna and Jamie go undercover as a catering waitress and an art collector, and discover that Oscar's employees, not including one of the main suspects, catering waiter Brandon, have been eating food meant for guests behind his back, and that Patricia's assistant curator Michael has been conducting art scams with his friends by badmouthing the other artists and persuading them to buy artist Ian Schwartz's works of art for twice the price, keeping the extra money for himself, while also attempting to poach Oscar to cater his own event, which was revealed by Charles' private investigator Eliot. Michael is also caught stealing wine meant for guests and giving it to his friends as payment for their badmouthing. During the confrontation, Patricia fires Michael, who states in his exit interview that he had no control over his friends' badmouthing and sees nothing wrong with helping a struggling young artist make more money. The narrator reveals that Michael was unsuccessful in curating his own art exhibits. Patricia has apologized to Oscar, who has fired his problem employees. She is no longer being overcharged. Mystery Diners: Brianna, Jamie. Private Investigator: Eliot. Targets: Oscar, Michael, Brandon, Ian.
117	3	"Young Blood"	June 17, 2015	TBA	N/A
Joseph Harvey, owner of Harvey's Steakhouse in Huntington Beach, California, has been noticing a decline in older clientele and discrepancies in alcohol, and receiving complaints about the younger customers getting rowdy. With Mystery Diner Destiney going undercover as a waitress, the team discovers that Joseph's recently-promoted manager, Gage, is behind this; he, waitress Kelly, bartender Johnny, and hostess Jeanette have been hosting loud, unauthorized dance parties out on the patio. Even worse, Gage's friend attempts to erase the evidence of the party by hacking into the security system and replacing the current footage with the previous night's footage; Charles' private investigator Eliot manages to turn the current footage back on. Charles has enlisted former Geppino's Sicilian Kitchen busboy Hal (whom he previously busted in "Daddy's Girl" the year before), who is now a rehabilitated Mystery Diner, to book the patio for a 75th birthday party; however, Gage denies Hal's party the patio, claiming it is double-booked, and tries to make up for it by giving them free appetizers and desserts. He then comps the entire party's meal for Hal when Hal complains about the dance party. Charles starts to regret hiring Hal when Hal has trouble hearing Charles' orders and then disobeys him by not touching another customer's drink; he is also seen joining the dance party. When one of the elderly customers suffers what appears to be a heart attack outside the restaurant and is taken to the hospital, Joseph reaches his boiling point. During the confrontation, Gage tries to defend himself by claiming the restaurant needs younger customers, but Joseph orders him to hope the customer pulls through, then fires him. In his exit interview, Gage states that he no longer cares about his job. The narrator reveals that Gage has apologized for his actions. All other employees involved with the party were fired and replaced with loyal employees. The elderly customer in need of medical attention only had an anxiety attack and returned home the next day. Charles has decided to give Hal another chance and hopes to work with him again in the future. Dance parties are no longer happening at Harvey's Steakhouse. Mystery Diners: Destiney, Hal. Private Investigator: Eliot. Targets: Gage, Kelly, Johnny, Jeanette.
118	4	"Backdoor Bootlegging"	June 24, 2015	TBA	N/A
Rick Bennett, owner of Weiland Brewery Restaurant in Long Beach, California, has been noticing discrepancies with his specialty beer supply. Mystery Diners Brianna and Jamie go undercover as a waitress and a customer, and discover that Rick's head bartender, Kyle, and manager Mike are behind the discrepancies. Charles' private investigator, Patrick, reports seeing Kyle take crates out of the restaurant and hand them to an unauthorized delivery driver during the stakeout. During the sting, the same driver returns with the same crates. Mike helps him unload them, which are revealed to contain growlers, which are contraband at the restaurant, since the beer is not brewed there; Kyle and Mike are then seen filling the growlers with Rick's beer, during which Patrick puts a tracking device on the van. Meanwhile, waitress Gia is seen sabotaging waiter Sai, who has won the restaurant's monthly "Employee Incentive Program" numerous times, by throwing away his customers' orders, forcing Sai to comp the meals himself. During the confrontation, Mike and Kyle try to cover up their scam by saying that they were hosting a party to promote Rick's beer. Still, Rick does not believe them because this has been going on for too long for that to be the case, and fires them both as Charles says the van in question is about to be intercepted by police. A remorseful Kyle apologizes to Rick before leaving. Rick thanks Charles by giving him some of his beer for free. The narrator reveals that the authorities have contacted Kyle and Mike. Gia was embarrassed by her actions and has apologized for her behavior. Sai keeps winning the "Employee Incentive Program." Rick's sales are back to normal, and he is no longer missing beer. Mystery Diners: Brianna, Jamie. Private Investigator: Patrick. Targets: Kyle, Mike, Gia, Sai.
119	5	"Extracurricular Activities"	July 1, 2015	TBA	N/A
Arthur and Maria Cummins, husband and wife owners of The Real Food Academy in Miami Shores, Florida, have been finding packaging of non-organic food in their trash and processed ingredients that they never use, and are concerned that their cooking instructors are going off-curriculum. To make matters worse, the owners' reputation is on the line because they were recently visited by investors interested in franchising with them. With Mystery Diner Domenica and Charles' private investigator Eliot going undercover as cooking students, the team discovers that New Zealand instructor Murray is not only going off-curriculum, but also stalling his class by hiring his own camera crew to film his own online show called "The Cooking Kiwi" while selling his own brand and sending his assistant Julie to a supermarket to buy non-organic food as Eliot confirms. Meanwhile, Puerto Rican instructor Christina and her German assistant Maria (not to be confused with the owner) are seen sticking to the curriculum and using the required ingredients. During the confrontation, Murray recognizes Charles and claims he was trying to make the owners famous, but they fire him and tell Julie they will discuss her future the next day. In his exit interview, Murray states that even though he was fired, he is happy to have appeared on a Food Network show and hopes that executives from the network will sponsor his project. The narrator reveals that Murray was unsuccessful at making "The Cooking Kiwi" a household name. Julie was terminated for her involvement in Murray's scheme. Christina and Maria continue to be loyal instructors. Students are once again only using organic ingredients. Mystery Diners: Domenica. Private Investigator: Eliot. Targets: Murray, Christina, Maria, Julie.
120	6	"Hamburger Burglar"	July 8, 2015	TBA	N/A
Michell and Bella Sanchez, husband and wife owners of Latin House in Miami, have been hearing from their customers that they have had their products at local food trucks and events, and suspect that their employees have gotten ahold of and are selling their award-winning burger recipes, especially Michell's mother/off-site warehouse manager Chuchi, who, aside from the owners, is the only one who knows the recipes. Before the sting, Charles' private investigator, Eliot, reports that he has seen Chuchi give away a tray of 50 burgers to her friend Kathy, causing Michell to suspect that his mother is selling the recipes. Mystery Diners Estephanie and Jamie go undercover as a warehouse employee and a customer, and discover that restaurant manager Enrique and delivery driver Richard are behind the recipe leakage; Enrique is seen ordering more burgers than instructed from Chuchi, with Richard selling the extra burgers to competing food trucks and making money on the side for both of them, as Eliot confirms; he then deters Richard by turning off his van using a vehicle tracking/disabling device. During the confrontation, Chuchi rants about Enrique and Richard's actions in her native language, and the owners fire them. Enrique and Richard state in their exit interview that the owners did not let them explain themselves and blame Chuchi for going wild on them. Michell and Bella believe Chuchi's explanations that Kathy was hosting a charity picnic for her church, and Chuchi donated the burgers to the picnic. Though Michell did not translate what Chuchi said about Charles. The narrator reveals that Enrique has moved away from Miami. Richard has found employment elsewhere. Chuchi continues to forgive the owners for thinking she was a suspect, while remaining a loyal employee. People can only get Michell's burgers at Latin House. Mystery Diners: Estephanie, Jamie. Private Investigator: Eliot. Targets: Chuchi, Enrique, Richard, Kathy. NOTE: This restaurant was previously featured on Guy Fieri's Diners, Drive-Ins and Dives in 2014. One of the owners, Michell, later competed on Chopped in the Season 24 episode "Tailgate Fate" in November 2015, four months after the Mystery Diners episode aired; he was the runner-up.
121	7	"Unhappy Hour"	July 15, 2015	TBA	N/A
Singer and musician Jorge Moreno, owner of Moreno's Cuba Café and Riviera Hotel in Miami Beach (who once toured with Madonna and was the winner of the 2002 Latin Grammy Award for Best New Artist), has been noticing discrepancies in alcohol and seeing too many familiar faces who are definitely not guests anymore, and believes his staff is sneaking unauthorized guests into the cafe's free happy hour, which is only available to guests of the hotel. Mystery Diners Tina and Jamie go undercover as a waitress and a guest and discover that Jorge's bellhop, Alex, and bartender William have been running unauthorized promotions, stealing room keys, and selling them to tourists who are not hotel guests, for extra cash. William is also seen going into empty hotel rooms, eating on the job, and bringing his friends into the bar, giving them hotel keys so they can enjoy happy hour. Jorge publicly denounces Alex and William and brings them back to the control room for the confrontation, during which Alex claims the scam benefited Jorge's performances. Still, Jorge fires him and William, comparing their plot to organizing a concert. The narrator reveals that Alex and William have found employment elsewhere. Assistant hotel manager Morgan now keeps all the hotel room keys in a locked drawer. The only people enjoying happy hour at Moreno's Cuba Cafe are the guests of the Riviera Hotel. Mystery Diners: Tina, Jamie. Private Investigator: Patrick. Targets: Morgan, William, Alex.
122	8	"Missing Links"	July 22, 2015	TBA	N/A
Jeff Wilson, general manager of Emerald Hills Country Club in Hollywood, Florida, has been experiencing discrepancies in food and beer sales and receiving complaints about non-members sneaking in and playing golf for free, as well as complaints from his waitress, Marah, who has an attitude problem. Before the sting, Charles' private investigator, Patrick, reports that charges have been racked up on deactivated accounts of three deceased members (whose names have been bleeped for obvious privacy reasons), which explains the food discrepancies. Mystery Diners Brianna and Jamie go undercover as a beverage cart girl and a golfer, and discover serious problems with bagboy Andrew, who is in the PGA Apprentice Program, and beverage cart girl Natalie, who is the daughter of one of Jeff's closest friends; Andrew has been sneaking his friends into the country club, and Natalie is revealed to be part of a legacy scam, where she sells the club's beer to the club's members and her own beer to non-members for cash only, pocketing the money. Her trainer taught her this. As for Marah, not only is she seen badmouthing members behind their backs, but she is also responsible for hacking into the deceased members' accounts; she is seen getting herself and two other employees free meals by using the deactivated accounts of deceased members, which is a federal crime and punishable by imprisonment. After Andrew's friends get drunk and then drive a golf cart into a pond, leading to one of them getting injured, Charles calls this the most reckless behavior he has seen in over 20 years of running his company. During the confrontation, Jeff fires Natalie, Andrew, and Marah. As she leaves, Natalie begs Jeff not to tell her father about this. Jeff states that he'll think about it. In his exit interview, Andrew expresses remorse for his actions, which might have led to his being kicked out of the PGA Apprentice Program. Jeff thanks Charles for his help, and the two go outside to play a game of golf. The narrator reveals that Natalie, Andrew, and Marah have found employment elsewhere. All of the club's computers were updated with a firewall and security software to prevent deactivated accounts of deceased members from being accessed. Sales are back to normal, rowdy people are staying off the golf course, and deceased members are no longer being charged for food. Mystery Diners: Brianna, Jamie. Private Investigator: Patrick. Targets: Natalie, Andrew, Marah.
123	9	"History Mystery"	July 29, 2015	TBA	N/A
Lee Schulman, owner of Old Vinings Inn in Vinings, Georgia, has been hearing rumors of unauthorized American Civil War tours taking place inside his historical restaurant. Charles' private investigator Eliot, who is familiar with Civil War history, and Mystery Diner Kendall go undercover as a customer and a waitress, and discover that recently-hired waiter Darryl is behind the whole scam with his friend Eric, who knows nothing about the Civil War (i.e., saying the Civil War started in Atlanta when the first shot was actually fired at Fort Sumter or claiming that Abraham Lincoln was at the hotel before it existed). Darryl is also seen bringing in packaged food and ruining the wine by putting vinegar in it, passing both the wine and food off as if they were from the Civil War era. During the confrontation, Lee fires Darryl. The narrator doesn't reveal what happened to Darryl and Eric afterwards, but he does mention that unauthorized tours at Lee's restaurant are no longer happening. Mystery Diners: Kendall. Private Investigator: Eliot. Targets: Joseph, Darryl, Rick, Eric.
124	10	"Red Ink"	August 5, 2015	TBA	N/A
Former Jacksonville Jaguars guard Uche Nwaneri, owner of the Anchor Bar and Tattoo Studio in Atlanta, has been noticing discrepancies in food and alcohol sales. Charles' private investigator, Robin, reports that manager James has been keeping the bar open after hours with two of his friends. Mystery Diners Meagen and Justin go undercover as a bartender and a customer, and discover that James and the food truck's prep cook Caleb have been giving away free food to the other employees and running an unauthorized promotion known as "The Anchor Club", where customers get tattoos of anchors on their hands for three times the regular price, with James pocketing the extra money, and use those tattoos to get free food and alcohol anytime they want, ripping off Uche and the food truck's owner Brian. Meanwhile, bartender Jennifer is seen taking a break to get one of her tattoos touched up, and tattoo artist Nick is seen bartering tattoos for alcohol. During the confrontation, Uche fires James and informs Brian of Caleb's involvement in the scam. In his exit interview, James states he did nothing wrong by bringing in more customers. The narrator reveals that James still maintains that every decision he made was in the restaurant's best interest. Brian has fired Caleb and hired a new prep cook. The unauthorized tattoo promotion has been discontinued. Sales at the bar, food truck, and tattoo studio have returned to normal. Mystery Diners: Meagen, Justin. Private Investigator: Robin. Targets: Brian, Jennifer, James, Nick, Caleb.
125	11	"Tour Bust"	October 7, 2015	TBA	N/A
Danny Hamilton Sr. and his son, Danny Jr., owners of Star Café and Star Coaches in Atlanta, are concerned about missing food in their restaurant and a rise in fuel expenses on their local tour buses; they suspect one of their bus drivers. For the sting, Mystery Diner Jamie poses as Charles's private investigator, Robin's son, who wants one of the party buses for his birthday party. At the same time, Meagen goes undercover as a waitress. The team discovers that while bus driver Brian is doing his job, local bus booking agent Angela, bus driver Sam (a long-time friend of Danny Sr.'s), and line cook Joseph have been running a side business behind their backs involving stealing food and alcohol, booking unauthorized trips, and putting extra miles on the buses. Sam is also seen going off-schedule by picking up Jamie and his party after dropping off a scheduled group at a pizza parlor. During the confrontation, the owners fire Sam and Angela. Sam is remorseful during his exit interview, sad not only about losing his job but also about losing Danny Sr. as a friend. Danny Sr. and Danny Jr. then take the bus to pick up the people who were dropped off at the pizza parlor, and will fire Joseph later. The narrator reveals that Angela has retired. Sam continues to apologize for his actions. Joseph has also been terminated and is working at another restaurant. There are no more discrepancies in the kitchen or on the road. Mystery Diners: Meagen, Jamie. Private Investigator: Robin. Targets: Brian, Angela, Sam, Joseph.
126	12	"Skating on Thin Ice"	October 14, 2015	TBA	N/A
Joe and Shauna Grammatico, owners of Epic Rollertainment in Murrieta, California, have been noticing missing rental skates and discrepancies with food and alcohol. Charles' private investigator Eliot reports that he purchased a pair of skates online that look exactly like the owners' skates, leading them to suspect that their employees are stealing the skates and selling them online. Eliot and Mystery Diner Kendall go undercover as a customer and a food truck cashier, and discover that the employees are not stealing the skates at all. However, manager Eric, food truck cashier Brittany, and skate rental cashiers Danny and Kaelyn have been throwing unauthorized skating parties after Eric closes down the rink 45 minutes early and takes a $5 cover charge at the door for as long as his guests can stay and have all the food and alcohol they want. During the party, Brittany is seen getting drunk, while Eric leaves the bank-deposit bag exposed in the office. Not only do two partygoers steal skates from the rental counter (which explains how the skates have been getting stolen and sold online), but they also sneak into the office to steal the money. After Shauna says she can't watch anymore, all three kick the partygoers out of the rink, and Joe confronts the thieves and orders them to give back what they stole, or he will call the police, which they do. He then rounds up Eric, Brittany, Danny, and Kaelyn for Charles to confront, during which the owners fire all four and ban them from the rink. The narrator reveals that Eric, Brittany, Danny, and Kaelyn have found new part-time employment. All other problem employees were terminated, while the remaining ones were given bonuses for their loyalty. The two skate thieves were contacted by the authorities and were arrested for their crimes. All of Joe and Shauna's skates are accounted for, and there are no more late-night parties. Mystery Diners: Kendall. Private Investigator: Eliot. Targets: Eric, Brittany, Danny, Zach, Kaelyn.
127	13	"Drive-Thru Drama"	October 21, 2015	TBA	N/A
Byron Takeuchi, owner of B-Man's Teriyaki and Burgers in Azusa, California, has been noticing a decline in customers. Charles' private investigator Eliot and Mystery Diners Kiel and Stephanie go undercover as customers and a cashier, and reveal that manager Alberto and drive-thru cashier Hobbs have been pulling scams; Alberto is revealed to be an obsessive environmental activist and is seen charging customers extra for to-go bags, extra napkins, and refills, because he believes the customers are ruining the environment. Fortunately, he does not keep the money for himself. At one point, a customer spills teriyaki sauce on his pants, and a heated argument breaks out between him and Alberto when the latter tries to charge the customer 25 cents apiece for extra napkins, prompting the customer to storm out of the restaurant. Even worse, Hobbs is caught pocketing money by utilizing a "Pay It Forward" scam. During the confrontation, Byron fires Hobbs and suspends Alberto for a week. Alberto is remorseful in his exit interview, but states he will never stop trying to save the planet. The narrator reveals that Hobbs is working at a competing fast-food restaurant. Alberto no longer charges customers for extra napkins, bags, or refills, remains committed to saving the environment, and has started a recycling program. Customers are no longer being scammed. Mystery Diners: Stephanie, Kiel. Private Investigator: Eliot Targets: Alberto, Vanessa, Hobbs.
128	14	"Family Feuds"	October 28, 2015	TBA	N/A
The Mystery Diners count down the Top 10 favorite family feuds from dishonest siblings, thieving spouses, and dysfunctional families caught on tape.: At #10 is "Bringing Down the Haus."; At #9 is "Grumpy Tom."; At #8 is "Mexicali Blues."; At #7 is "Red Hot Mess."; At #6 is "Security Issues."; At #5 is "Heavy Metal Mess."; At #4 is "Managing Disaster."; At #3 is "Crazy Hearts."; At #2 is "Hamburger Burglar."; At #1 is "All in the Family."

=== Season 11 (2015–2016) ===
No. overall	No. in season	Title	Original release date	Prod. code	U.S. viewers (millions)
129	1	"Street Vendor Violation"	November 4, 2015	TBA	N/A
Freddy Braidy and Abdi Manavi, owners of Supperclub in Los Angeles, are concerned about lackluster dinner sales and a dip in bottle service sales. Before the sting, Charles' private investigator, Eliot, reports that he has seen manager Johnny buying three large boxes of vodka from a liquor store, causing the owners to believe he is running a side business. In addition, he discovered an unidentified sausage vendor who had been repeatedly told not to operate outside the club. With Eliot posing as the host of a large party and Mystery Diner Felicia going undercover as a bottle service girl, the team discovers that Johnny has been running a scam with his girlfriend Kate and one of her friends involving the vodka he earlier purchased by bringing it into the club, and selling them for less than half the price of the club's own vodka. Meanwhile, head bottle service girl Caymen believes she is not paid enough and is working with the unidentified sausage vendor to make extra money, which is causing the poor dinner sales. After Johnny cancels a table reservation to let Kate and her friend sell a bottle of vodka, Caymen snaps and kicks a tray full of drinks and gets into a heated argument with Johnny. When the owners confront Johnny and Caymen after breaking up the argument, they are brought before Charles, while the customers outside watch as one of them tells Charles to "give them Hell". Caymen storms off while claiming that she can get a better job at any other club in Hollywood. The owners fire Johnny as he walks off. The customers waiting outside express their displeasure with the two ex-employees as they leave and praise Charles for getting rid of them. The owners treat Charles to the bottle service as the customers continue to cheer. The narrator reveals that Johnny still maintains that he did nothing wrong. Caymen has apologized for her actions. The unidentified sausage vendor has not returned. Bottle service sales have returned to normal, and people can only get supper from Supperclub's kitchen. Mystery Diners: Felicia. Private Investigator: Eliot. Targets: Johnny, Robert, Caymen, Kate.
130	2	"From Russia Without Love"	November 11, 2015	TBA	N/A
Joey Shea, an aspiring Los Angeles restaurateur, hires Charles to investigate Russian chef Yanni and his manager wife Bella, with whom he wants to go into business before he invests his life savings in a new Russian-Mexican fusion restaurant he wants to call "The Russican." Joey's problem is that he cannot find any information about Yanni and Bella's backgrounds that matches what they have told him. He is also suspicious because Bella does not allow him or any of the wait staff to go into the kitchen. Charles tells Joey that they will run the sting at the next pop-up event, which some investors will attend. At the beginning of the sting, Charles' private investigator Stephanie confirms Joey's theory about Yanni and Bella's backgrounds. She too cannot verify their education or even their records of living in Russia. Mystery Diner Rob goes undercover as a waiter, but gets fired on the spot by Bella and thrown out for trying to go into the kitchen. Luckily, Charles brings in Mystery Diner Eva as a dinner guest, and the team discovers that Yanni and Bella are conducting a scam to rip off Joey and the other investors. Eva, who is half-Russian, also discovers that Bella does not speak Russian and that she and Yanni have been putting on fake Russian accents. Yanni and Bella are also shown to be in cahoots with head investor Travis, and prep cook Olga (who is also Bella's cousin) is sent to buy to-go orders from local Russian and Mexican restaurants before prepping them in the kitchen with bartender Troy's help, as confirmed by Stephanie. This leads Joey and Charles to conclude that Yanni and Bella are con artists, prompting Joey to force his way to the kitchen to round up Yanni, Bella, and Travis. During the confrontation, Bella mistakes Charles for a KGB agent, which further confirms that she is not Russian, as the KGB went defunct in 1991. She and Yanni come clean about not being Russian after Joey sees the evidence that they don't speak Russian. Joey informs them that their partnership is over and plans to call the police. Charles states that he already did the job, and they have just arrived. Yanni, Bella, and Travis are arrested by police officers outside, as Olga and Troy are also shown being arrested. The narrator reveals that Yanni, Bella, and Travis are currently being prosecuted following their arrest. Although accomplices in the scam, Olga and Troy cooperated with the authorities and will receive reduced sentences. Despite these discouraging events, Joey remains optimistic and still plans on opening his own restaurant in the near future. Mystery Diners: Rob, Eva. Private Investigator: Stephanie. Targets: Yanni, Bella, Olga, Troy, Travis.
131	3	"Steals on Wheels"	November 18, 2015	TBA	N/A
Dr. Cynthia Clark, owner of Homebound Meal Delivery in Pasadena, California, has been receiving several customer complaints about missing food and late deliveries, mostly from one of her regular elderly customers, Mary. While setting up a bait house operated by Mystery Diner Hal (who had previously appeared in "Daddy's Girl" and "Young Blood"), the team discovers that Chris, one of Cynthia's drivers, is the direct cause of the customers' complaints. He has been spending too much time socializing at some of his customers' homes and being late on his deliveries. He even plays cards with Hal, who has improved on his work ethic as a Mystery Diner since the incident from "Young Blood" (although he fell asleep before Chris' arrival and took out his earpiece, forcing one of Charles' producers to wake him up). Anna, Cynthia's other driver, is efficient and has never had a single customer complaint except from Mary, who has been lying to Cynthia that her meals are missing so she can eat them for free. However, Charles' private investigator, Patrick, reveals that she had previously been arrested for DUI. Head chef John has also been stealing food and supplies from the other businesses operating at the communal kitchen. During the confrontation, Cynthia fires John and lets Chris off with a warning, telling him to keep his conversations with customers to a minimum. Chris is remorseful during his exit interview, stating that although he cares deeply for the customers, he will spend less time with them going forward. The narrator reveals that John had begun making reparations to the other businesses he had stolen from in the communal kitchen. Anna has apologized for not being honest about her DUI and has not had any other traffic violations. Chris has been focused on his deliveries and keeping his conversations to five minutes. Cynthia personally delivers Mary's meals. Cynthia's customers are now getting their food on time. Mystery Diners: Hal. Private Investigator: Patrick. Targets: Anna, Chris, John, Mary.
132	4	"Secondhand Scam"	November 25, 2015	TBA	N/A
Luca Riemma, owner of Riemma Kitchen Warehouse in Los Angeles, has been receiving complaints from his customers about finding food residue inside factory-sealed appliances they had just purchased. Charles's private investigator, Melissa, reports that she found a roll of packaging labels in the trash titled "Tree Brothers Bakerama," causing Luca to suspect that one of his employees is running a side bakery business and using the appliances in the warehouse to bake their products. With Mystery Diner Jamie going undercover as an appliance salesman, the team discovers that night security guard Robert has been sneaking his triplet brothers into the warehouse after closing hours to bake muffins using the soon-to-be-delivered appliances for their business, "Three Brothers Bakerama"; the labels Melissa found had a typo. Just before the confrontation, Charles has Jamie sneak into the warehouse to spy on Robert and his brothers. However, Jamie nearly blows his cover when he accidentally bumps a trash can, but he barely manages to escape without revealing himself. During the confrontation, Robert offers Luca a partnership in his business, but Luca refuses, fires him, and bans him and his brothers from the warehouse. The narrator reveals that Robert has devoted all of his time and energynto his bakery business. However, he and his brothers have been unsuccessful at finding a new location for Three Brothers Bakerama. Luca's customers are no longer complaining about dirty appliances. Mystery Diners: Jamie. Private Investigator: Melissa. Targets: Robert (assisted by his fellow triplet brothers).
133	5	"Unhappy Holidays"	December 2, 2015	TBA	N/A
Nirav Patel, owner of Smokin' Barrel in Hoboken, New Jersey, has been noticing a decline in sales every holiday season. Mystery Diners Jamie and Elliott go undercover as a customer and a fundraiser Santa Claus (who has a permit), and reveal that manager Sammy is running a fake charity with an unidentified woman dressed as a street Christmas elf, who happens to be her friend. They also witness this elf being rude to passersby and customers, as well as Elliott, and catch her and Sammy splitting the money from their scam. The elf is also seen giving away unauthorized half-off coupons for restaurant meals to customers who donate $10 or more, which explains the decline in sales. Also, Charles' private investigator Dennis (who used to work for a Brooklyn precinct of the NYPD) reveals that waitress Mo was badly affected by Sammy's scam and had been secretly stealing toys for her own son from a real charity Nirav has been running as well, and has a problem with unpaid parking tickets. During the confrontation, Nirav fires Sammy and orders her to leave the restaurant before he calls the police. In her exit interview, Sammy states she was fired for bringing more customers into the restaurant. Mo apologizes for not admitting the fines and explains that she stole the toys because Sammy's scam has prevented her from getting enough tips to pay for Christmas presents for her son or her parking tickets. Nirav gives Mo another chance, but orders her to come to him if she ever ends up in such a bind again. The narrator reveals that Sammy still maintains the donations were intended for a legitimate charity. The elf was issued a restraining order prohibiting her from coming within 50 feet of the restaurant. Nirav has helped Mo pay her fines and buy her son's Christmas gifts. Business at Smokin' Barrel during the holidays has returned to normal. Mystery Diners: Jamie, Elliot. Private Investigator: Dennis Targets: Sammy, Mo, Elf.
134	6	"Comic Book Caper"	December 30, 2015	TBA	N/A
Vlane Carter, owner of Action Burger in Brooklyn and the creator of the Bio-Sapien comics, has been noticing some collectible comic books go missing such as one Green Lantern comic, one Hawkman comic, and one Donald Duck comic, as well as hearing rumors of heated debates between the staff and customers. Before the sting, Charles' private investigator Dennis reports that he found the stolen comics for sale as a bundle on a website where the seller cannot be identified. Unfortunately, for Vlane and the team, the comics had already sold out. Mystery Diners Beatrice and Jamie go undercover as a cashier and a customer, and discover that Jessica, whom Vlane hired to portray Bellona (a Bio-Sapien character), is behind the theft and sales of the comics, while taking advantage of manager Gary, has been debating with the customers about superheroes (like whose a better superhero), movies, actors, etc. Vlane's cook, Jon, is also seen leaving his post in the kitchen to take selfies with Jessica, leading to burgers burning and customers leaving the restaurant. Jessica is seen lying to Jamie about the value of an Iron-Man comic, claiming it is a reprint, and buys it from him for $10, with cashier Keenan loaning her the money; she then posts it for sale on the same website Dennis found for $350. During the confrontation, Vlane fires Jessica and orders her to return the Bellona costume immediately. She mentions in her exit interview that she will not give the Bellona costume back to Vlane. Gary apologizes for his negligence, and Vlane puts him on probation for three months. Vlane thanks Charles for his help and plans to name a burger after him. The narrator reveals that the authorities contracted Jessica, who was in the midst of making reparations. Vlane let his employees off with a warning, and they no longer engage in debates with customers. A new actress was hired to portray Bellona. Vlane's comic books are no longer being stolen. Mystery Diners: Beatrice, Jamie. Private Investigator: Dennis. Targets: Gary, Keenan, Jon, Jessica.
135	7	"Vicious Valets"	January 6, 2016	TBA	N/A
Kitty Hernandez, owner of Breuckelen Colony in Brooklyn, becomes suspicious after receiving complaints from her customers about receiving parking tickets, as her restaurant has a contract with a valet service, Vic's Valet. Kitty has also been noticing upswings in her water bills. She grows even more suspicious when Charles' private investigator, Daniel, reports that her contract with Vic's Valet was terminated two months earlier, but two valets from Vic's Valet, Sly and Paul, are still working outside the restaurant and have no city permits or business licenses. Upon calling Vic to learn about when the contract for the valet service ends, Kitty learns from Vic that her manager, Mark, had already terminated their contract (which he did not have the authority to do). Kitty tells Vic that she will rectify this when they meet in a few days. With Daniel observing the valet service from a chase vehicle and Mystery Diner Jamie going undercover as a customer, the team discovers that, since Sly and Paul no longer work for Vic, they are parking cars in locations away from the restaurant where parking is prohibited and running an illegal car wash service with help from some unidentified servicemen, which explains the water bill upswing. Sly is also seen disposing of parking tickets issued by the meter maid. The situation worsens when Kitty learns that Mark is the one behind the scam and has also been responsible for stealing citrus fruits and other ingredients to make the carwash business "organic". After a car gets towed away, Kitty brings Mark back to the control room for the confrontation, during which she fires him. In his exit interview, Mark claims he was doing a good deed for Kitty's business while stating the car wash service was a "visionary thing". Kitty thanks Charles for his help and plans to rectify the contract issue with Vic's Valet. The narrator reveals that Mark has not returned the Mystery Diners' calls. Sly and Paul were terminated from Vic's Valet. The car wash service has not returned. Kitty has reinstated her contract with Vic's Valet to handle the valet service. Kitty is no longer getting complaints, and her water bills are back to normal. Mystery Diners: Jamie. Private Investigator: Daniel. Targets: Mark, Sly, Paul.
136	8	"Venue Vandals"	January 13, 2016	TBA	N/A
Manny Martins, owner and head chef of Spanish Potato Grill in Brick Township, New Jersey, is planning on relocating his restaurant to a bigger location across town, but has been noticing theft and vandalism taking place at the new location while it is under construction, leading to the day of the grand reopening getting postponed again and again, as well as a decline in customers at the current location. Manny's main suspects are his manager, Toni, who, aside from him, is the only one with access to the new location, and his sous chef, Franky, with whom he has had arguments. Charles' private investigator, Daniel, reports that he has seen Franky making a deal with a realtor to open his own restaurant, leading Manny to believe it will be a Portuguese restaurant and that Franky will steal his recipes, too, since he has access to them. With Mystery Diner Megan going undercover as a waitress and Daniel staking out the new location, Toni is shown to be a model employee, and, like Manny, she believes that Franky is not qualified to run his own restaurant. The decline in customers is then revealed: hostess Crystal is seen lying about having any openings at the restaurant, directing customers to Franky's unopened new restaurant, and terrorizing them by pulling the fire alarm. Meanwhile, waiter Bryan is seen breaking into the new location, spray-painting "Manny sucks" on the wall, and smashing vases while stealing the POS system that is soon to be installed. Daniel catches Bryan trying to leave the scene and places him under citizen's arrest. Bringing him back to the restaurant's current location, Manny then collects Crystal and Franky. During the confrontation, with Daniel lingering by to be ready to take Bryan to the arriving police car, Manny gets angry at Franky and attempts to attack him, forcing Charles to restrain him. Crystal claimed that she smelled smoke and thought there was a fire. Manny disagrees with her claims by pointing out that he didn't see any smoke or fire in the restaurant, and fires all three of them. Manny then invites Charles for a dinner cooked personally by him. The narrator reveals that Franky lost his lease on the building he acquired and has been unable to secure a new location. Bryan was contacted by the authorities and returned the items he stole. Crystal still maintains no wrongdoing and has found employment elsewhere. Manny has successfully relocated Spanish Potato Grill, and business there has never been better. Mystery Diners: Megan. Private Investigator: Daniel. Targets: Franky, Crystal, Bryan, Toni.
137	9	"Lobster Looting"	January 20, 2016	TBA	N/A
Richard and Marilyn Schlossbach, sibling owners of Langosta Lounge in Asbury Park, New Jersey, are concerned about a discrepancy in their lobster supply. Mystery Diners Megan and Natale go undercover as a waitress and a customer, and discover different things happening; manager Diane is seen having her own order of lobsters at the bottom (fortunately, she is paying for them out of her own pocket and has the receipt to prove it). Even though efficient at her job, waitress Sam is seen promoting her own swimsuits to female customers in to-go bags while in cahoots with Eva, the manager of the Lightly Salted Surf Shop next door (which Marilyn owns as part of their property), with purchases being cash only. The lobster discrepancy is then revealed: waiter Mikey is a lobster activist, as he is seen lying to customers about the restaurant having no lobsters left, badmouthing lobster consumption, and stealing lobster traps from the marina, as confirmed by Charles' private investigator, Dennis. Mikey is also seen stealing lobsters from the lobster tank. During the confrontation, Mikey states that saving lobsters is more important to him than facing the consequences, but the owners fire him and let Sam and Eva go. Before Diane can prove she stole nothing, the owners see footage of Mikey fleeing to the beach in his latest attempt to preserve the lobster population, prompting Charles and Dennis to chase him and stop him. Marilyn states that they are at a loss for words for what he saw, and Richard orders Mikey to leave the property, with Dennis escorting him away to possibly turn him over to the police. Richard and Marilyn thank Charles for his help and plan to cook him a lobster dinner. The narrator reveals that Mikey remains unapologetic in his plans to preserve the lobster population. Without their own location, Sam and Eva were unsuccessful at selling their own swimsuit line. Diane was let off with a warning and no longer orders lobsters for her own consumption. Lobster sales are back to normal. Mystery Diners: Megan, Natale. Private Investigator: Dennis. Targets: Diane, Sam, Mikey, Eva.
138	10	"Tables Turned"	January 27, 2016	TBA	N/A
In a Mystery Diners first, two of El Toro De Oro's waitstaff Bryan Cid and Jessica Rubenstein in Maywood, California, hire Charles to see if horrifying accusations made against general manager Ryan are true, with the help of the restaurant's new owner Xavier Franco (who came in from Las Vegas and was friends with Ryan). Because Xavier is a hands-off owner, the team could not set up the hidden cameras and microphones without raising suspicion, as the narrator explained. Therefore, the camera operators and audio technicians had to pose as customers. Charles's makeup artists give Xavier a foolproof disguise so that he and Charles can pose as customers and conduct the sting from inside the restaurant. Senior Mystery Diner Amanda is also there, posing as a customer with her date on the patio. Bryan and Jessica also go undercover as Mystery Diners, marking the second time on the show since "Very Bad Bosses," where actual restaurant employees appear as the Mystery Diners. Xavier gets a good look at the abuse that Ryan is giving to his male waitstaff and bussers; he does not even have shift manager Stew properly train the new employees. Amanda tests Ryan's managerial skills by smashing a plate of food on the floor and having busboy Julio clean it up, which he was not trained to do. On top of that, he is also seen giving his girlfriend complimentary meals, allowing her to take paychecks, even though she is not an employee, and sexually harassing the female waitstaff. When Ryan is caught verbally abusing Stew, Amanda escorts Ryan to the restaurant's parking lot for the confrontation, where Xavier removes his disguise and scolds Ryan for the oppression he has caused with the entire restaurant staff. Ryan thought his actions were helping Xavier in handling the business, but Charles and Amanda disagreed. Charles and Xavier have evidence of his abuse that is not only hurting morale in the restaurant but also chasing customers away. Xavier fires Ryan and ends their friendship, stating that Ryan has not grown up at all. After Ryan departs, Charles and Amanda suggest to Xavier that he should let his staff know he appreciates them and promote one of his loyal staff members as general manager. The narrator reveals that Ryan has been unsuccessful at mending his friendship with Xavier. Ryan's girlfriend has not returned to the restaurant, and her last paycheck was cancelled before she could cash it. Stew has been promoted to general manager. Workplace harmony has returned, and employee morale has never been better at El Toro De Oro. Mystery Diners: Amanda, Bryan, Jessica. Targets: Ryan, Stew. Note: Because of how the sting was operated, no private investigators were used in this sting.
139	11	"Hot Meat"	March 30, 2016	TBA	N/A
Tony Rivoli, owner of Rivoli's in Toms River, New Jersey, begins to believe that his new meat purveyor, Eric, is selling him stolen goods after noticing a significant decrease in order prices. Mystery Diner Danny goes undercover as a waiter, which proves difficult for him since Rivoli's is a family-owned business and most employees are unfriendly towards outsiders. In addition, they are also shown to have zero tolerance for mispronouncing the restaurant's name. Meanwhile, Charles' private investigator Daniel does a background check on Eric (whose last name is bleeped) and reveals he is an ex-con where he did time in prison for three years from 2009 to 2012 for aggravated assault and is also wanted in Pennsylvania, Massachusetts, and Delaware. Eric also gave Tony a business card for a meat-packing company that the team discovered was bogus (the address was for an abandoned warehouse). Later, Daniel drives over to Eric's house, where his delivery truck is, and Eric's driver, Les, comes to pick him up. Daniel follows them to another abandoned building where another delivery truck is waiting. The team finds out that the meat being sold at low prices was actually from another meat-packing company, and that a delivery they received was from a truck driver named Omar. After they witness Omar trying to end Eric and Les' deal, only to be roughed up by them, Charles asks Daniel to call the police and to have them meet him at the restaurant. Meanwhile, Danny's cover is blown when the staff discovers that he has a wire on him, but Tony runs down there and clears things up with them. He then brings Eric and Les to the control room for the confrontation, during which the two police officers arrive at the same time and place handcuffs on the two culprits. Tony terminates his business relationship with Eric and Les, and the police officers then take them away. Happy that none of his staff and family were involved in Eric and Les' scheme, Tony thanks Charles and plans to cook him a pasta dish. The narrator reveals that Eric and Les are currently awaiting trial while no longer providing meat to anyone. The other meatpacking company was informed of the scheme, and Omar was terminated for his involvement. Tony rehired his old meat purveyor, and his meat prices are just right. Mystery Diners: Danny. Private Investigator: Daniel. Targets: Eric, Les, Omar.
140	12	"Rigged Rental"	April 6, 2016	TBA	N/A
Steve Kovach, owner of Nashville Street Tacos and The Stillery in Nashville, believes that people are living in his part-time apartment above Nashville Street Tacos while he is home in Phoenix, after noticing that his apartment is not the way he left it. Also, he has been noticing discrepancies in food sales at both restaurants. Charles' private investigator, Kimberly, reports that she found Steve's apartment listed online for $150 a night, along with a free continental breakfast. Mystery Diners Brooke and Jamie go undercover as a waitress at The Stillery and an apartment renter, and uncover serious problems with The Stillery manager Chris and Nashville Street Tacos prep cook Lacey when the latter is seen giving the former a copy of the key to Steve's apartment; Chris has been running a rental scam for a self-help group in Steve's apartment (under the name Justin) while he is away and later a party secretly booked by Kimberly for Jamie, who brings his cat Mr. Pickles over as a test because Steve is allergic to cats; Chris has also been charging renters $50 extra to bring pets, showing no concerns for Steve's health. Chris has also been offering unwelcome guests half-price discounts at both restaurants, which explains the food discrepancies. In addition, Lacey is seen upstairs cleaning the bathroom and taking out the trash before Jamie's party arrives to suppress any suspicions. During the confrontation, Chris claims that he was trying to help bring in extra money for both restaurants, but Steve does not believe him and fires him and Lacey. In his exit interview, Chris remains unremorseful and says Steve should not be concerned about his apartment, since it is empty most of the time. The narrator reveals that Chris and Lacey have found employment elsewhere. No more meetings or parties have been held in Steve's apartment. However, Steve was partly inspired to rent out his apartment, provided the occupants do not have pets and follow his house rules. His apartment and businesses are back to normal. Mystery Diners: Brooke, Jamie. Private Investigator: Kimberly. Targets: Matthew, Chris, Lacey, Evan.
141	13	"Love Hurts"	April 13, 2016	TBA	N/A
The Mystery Diners count down the Top 10 favorite love-related scams that broke hearts as well as love delusions: At #10 is "Promotion Sabotage."; At #9 is "Daddy's Girl."; At #8 is "Love Hurts."; At #7 is "Dinner Drama."; At #6 is "Life's Not a Beach."; At #5 is "Private Chef Sting."; At #4 is "Comic Book Caper."; At #3 is "Lobster Looting."; At #2 is "Singles Night."; At #1 is "Crazy Hearts."
142	14	"Crooked Contest"	April 20, 2016	TBA	N/A
Rose Melillo and Tom Kiermaier, owners of Belcourt Taps in Nashville, are hearing rumors that their songwriting contest is rigged, as they don't even tolerate copyright violations. Mystery Diner Katie goes undercover as a songwriter participating in the contest, along with special guest Mystery Diner and 80s pop star Tiffany Darwish, who is a longtime friend of Rose's. The team reveals that bartender Lee has been sabotaging the singers with free alcohol and getting them drunk so they cannot perform properly, and also setting off a blender to drown out the sound of their singing. Sound engineer Benjamin is seen messing with the sound and lighting controls, so the other performers, who are not intoxicated, cannot perform well either. On top of it, they are having contest performers sing songs written by Lee and rigging the votes so they can win, as confirmed by Charles' private investigator, Angela, who also reveals that Benjamin owns his own recording company. This leads up to a singer named Paige winning the contest with a song from Lee that contained lyrics from her phone. During the confrontation, Benjamin and Lee claim they were doing their jobs and the stage problems were legit, but the owners have seen the evidence and do not believe them. When Charles asks Paige if she wrote the song she sang, she does not answer and starts to cry silently, which Charles takes as a no. The owners fire Lee and Benjamin and tell Paige that she is disqualified. The narrator reveals that Lee and Benjamin have ended their collaboration. Outside of Paige, three singers who won previous contests with Lee's songs were also disqualified. Belcourt Taps' songwriting contest is no longer being rigged. Mystery Diners: Katie, Tiffany. Private Investigator: Angela. Targets: Benjamin, Bridgette, Marissa, Lee, Paige.
143	15	"Surprise Twists"	April 27, 2016	TBA	N/A
The Mystery Diners count down the Top 10 biggest twists that surprised Charles Stiles and the various owners that called for his help: At #10 is "The Spoils of Victory."; At #9 is "Cheese-Burglar."; At #8 is "Daddy's Girl."; At #7 is "Repeat Offender."; At #6 is "Charitable Donations."; At #5 is "Magic Hassle."; At #4 is "Mascot Mayhem."; At #3 is "From Russia Without Love."; At #2 is "Paranormal Activities."; At #1 is "Secondhand Scam."
