= Tri-State Music Festival =

Annual festival in Oklahoma

The Tri-State Music Festival is an annual festival in Enid, Oklahoma since 1932. It is named for the three original participating states, Oklahoma, Kansas, and Texas.

The festival includes a jazz festival, a parade, a grand concert and a carnival. It attracts approximately 8,000 participants and nearly 20,000 performances annually.

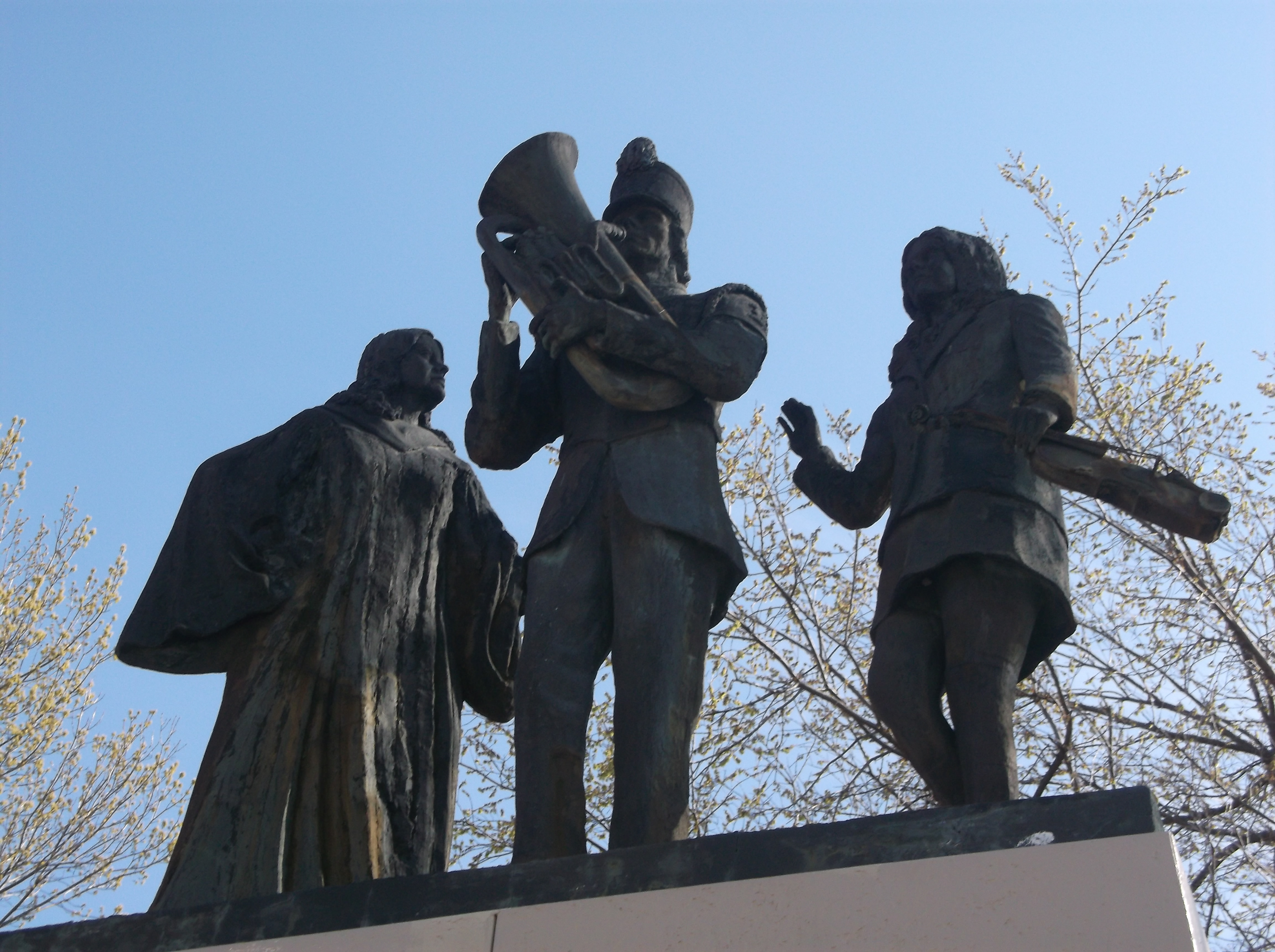
Tri-State Festival statue

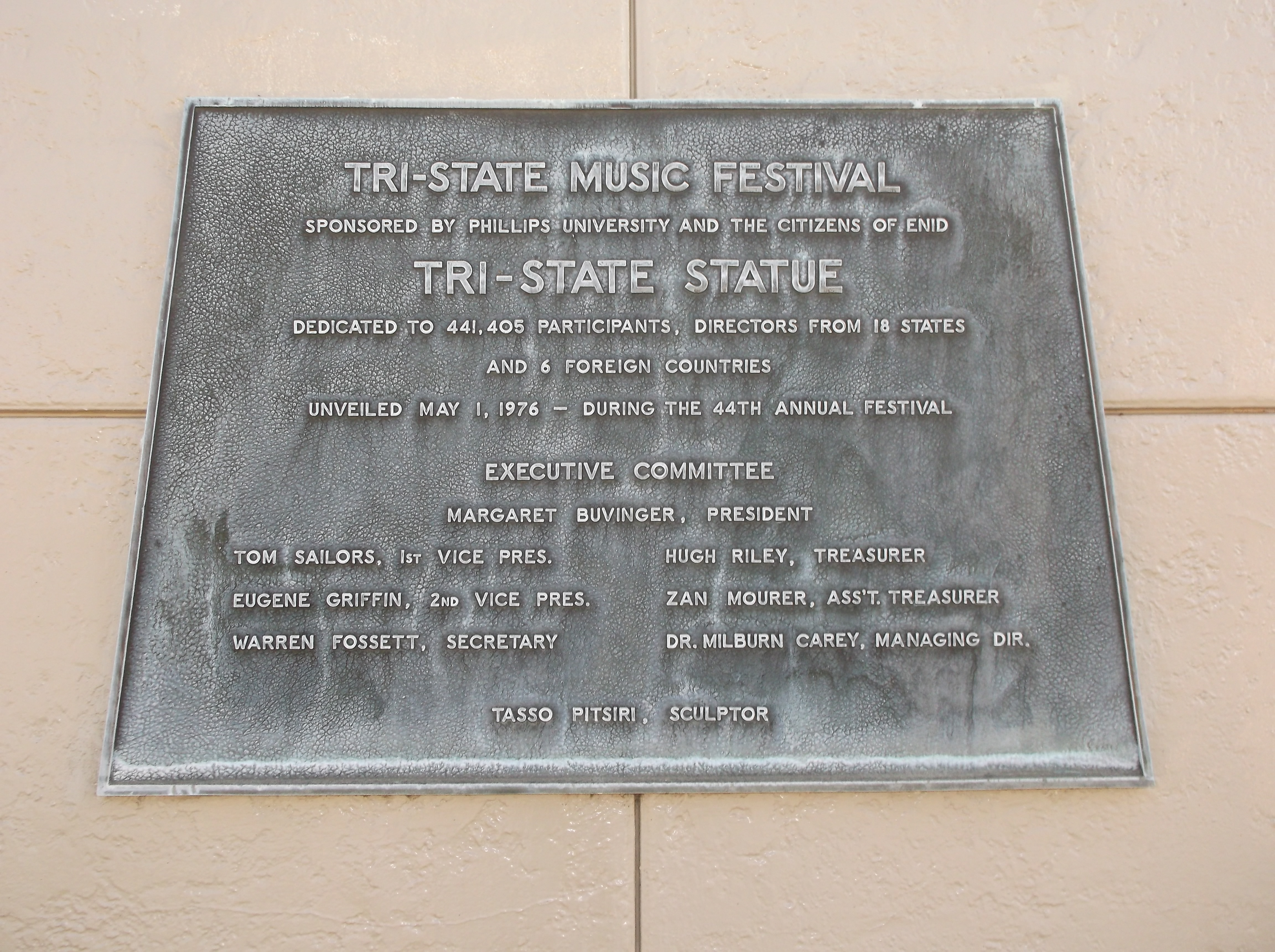
Tri-State Festival plaque

== History ==
The annual event began as Phillips Band Day in 1932, drawing bands from Oklahoma, Kansas, and Texas. In 1933, it was renamed the Tri-State Band Festival and eventually became the Tri-State Music Festival and expanded to include additional music groups.

The 2013 festival included a concert and guitar clinic with classical guitarist Edgar Cruz.

== Components ==
The 2012 Tri-State Music Festival included a parade and a Grand Concert at Chisholm Trail Expo Center. The event also includes a Tri-State Dance.

The festival also includes a jazz festival in downtown Enid, Oklahoma and an Ottaway Carnival in Oakwood Mall.
