= Pioneer-Pleasant Vale Schools =

School district in Oklahoma

Pioneer Pleasant Vale Schools

Location
- 6520 East Wood Road, Waukomis, Oklahoma 73773 Garfield County, Oklahoma

District information
- Type: Public
- Motto: Home of the Mustangs
- Grades: PK-12
- Established: 1892
- Superintendent: Brent Koontz

Other information
- Website: ppv.k12.ok.us

Pioneer-Pleasant Vale Schools is a school district in Garfield County, Oklahoma. The district consists of two schools, Pioneer High School in an unincorporated area (with a Waukomis address but not in Waukomis, grades 7–12) and Pleasant Vale Elementary (grades PK-6) in Enid.

The district boundary includes much of eastern Enid.
