= Enid, Oklahoma =

- City
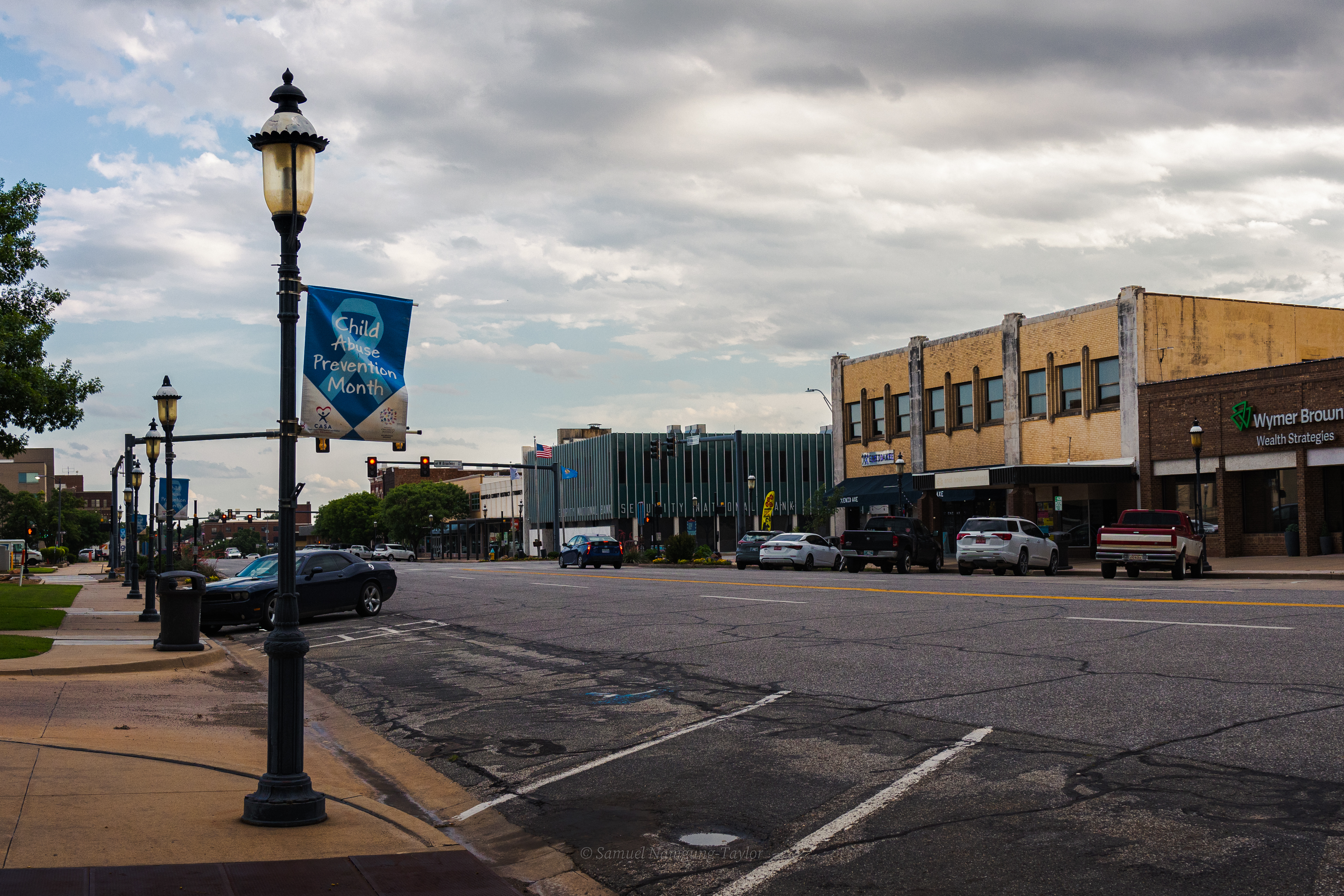
- Downtown Enid, 2026

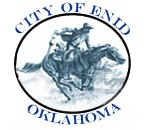
- Flag Seal
- Nicknames: "Wheat Capital of the United States", "Queen Wheat City of Oklahoma"
- Motto: "Purple Martin Capital of Oklahoma"
- Location in Garfield County and the state of Oklahoma

- Location in Oklahoma Location in the United States
- Coordinates: 36°24′2″N 97°52′51″W
- Country: United States
- State: Oklahoma
- County: Garfield
- Founded: 1893

Government
  - Type: Council-Manager
  - Mayor: David Mason
  - City Manager: Jerald Gilbert

Area
  - City: 74.02 sq mi (191.71 km^{2})
  - Land: 73.93 sq mi (191.49 km^{2})
  - Water: 0.081 sq mi (0.21 km^{2})
- Elevation: 1,250 ft (380 m)

Population (2020)
  - City: 51,308
  - Density: 694.0/sq mi (267.94/km^{2})
  - Metro: 62,846 (US: 384th)
- Time zone: UTC−6 (CST)
  - Summer (DST): UTC−5 (CDT)
- ZIP Codes: 73701, 73703
- Area code: 580
- FIPS code: 40-23950
- GNIS feature ID: 2410442
- Website: www.enid.org

Enid (/ˈiːnɪd/ EE-nid) is the ninth-largest city in the U.S. state of Oklahoma. It is the county seat of Garfield County. In the 2020 census, the population was 51,308. Enid was founded during the opening of the Cherokee Outlet in the Land Run of 1893, and is named after Enid, a character in Alfred, Lord Tennyson's Idylls of the King. In 1991, the Oklahoma state legislature designated Enid the "purple martin capital of Oklahoma." Enid holds the nickname of "Queen Wheat City" and "Wheat Capital" of Oklahoma and the United States for its immense grain storage capacity, and has the third-largest grain storage capacity in the world.

== Etymology ==
In summer 1889, Marcus A Low, the Rock Island general attorney, visited the local railroad station then under construction, and inquired about its name. Disliking the original name, he renamed the station Enid, after a character in Alfred, Lord Tennyson's Idylls of the King.

A more fanciful story of how the town received its name is popular. According to that tale, in the days following the land run, some enterprising settlers decided to set up a chuckwagon and cook for their fellow pioneers, hanging a sign that read "DINE". Some other, more free-spirited settlers, turned that sign upside down to read, of course, "ENID". The name stuck.

== History ==
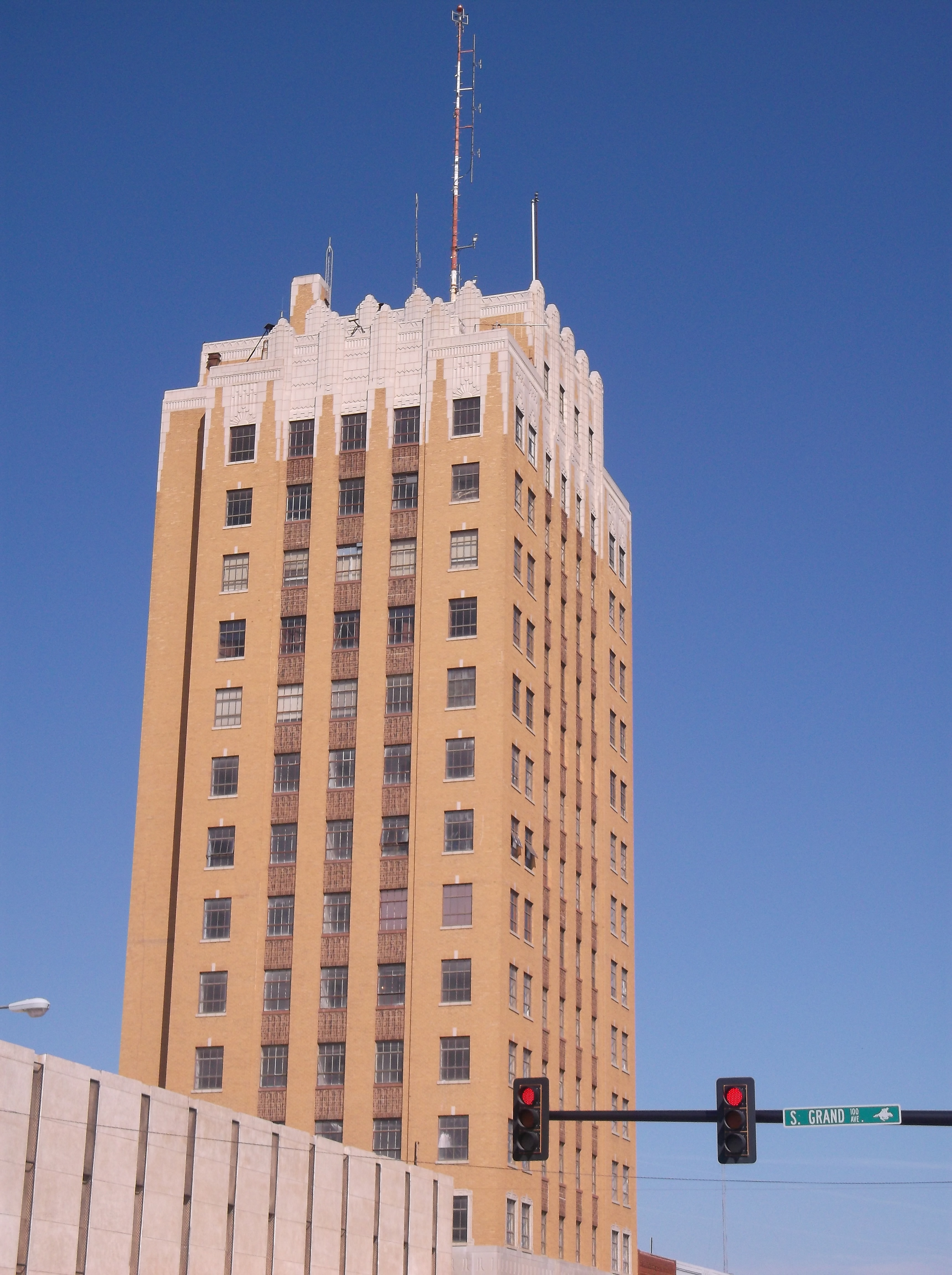
The Broadway Tower, Enid's tallest building, was built during the city's "Golden Age".

Prior to the Land Run of 1893, the land where present-day Enid, Oklahoma sits was part of O County in the Cherokee Outlet, and was occupied by the Cherokee people following the Treaty of New Echota and the Cherokee trail of tears. Historically, the area was a hunting ground for the Wichita, Osage, and Kiowa tribes. The Chisholm Trail, stage coach lines, mail routes, and railroads passed through stations in the town which was then known as Skeleton.

During the opening of the Cherokee Outlet in the Land Run of 1893, Enid was the location of a land office which is now preserved in its Humphrey Heritage Village, part of the Cherokee Strip Regional Heritage Center. Enid, the rail station, now North Enid, Oklahoma, was the original town site endorsed by the government. It was platted by the surveyor W. D. Twichell, then of Amarillo, Texas.

The Enid-Pond Creek Railroad War ensued when the Department of the Interior moved the government site 3 mi (5 km) south of the station prior to the land run, which was then called South Enid. During the run, due to the Rock Island's refusal to stop, people leaped from the trains to stake their claim in the government-endorsed site. By the afternoon of the run, Enid's population was estimated at 12,000 people, located in the Enid's 80-acre (320,000 m^{2}) town plat.

Enid's original plat in 1893 was 6 blocks wide by 11 blocks long, with the town square on the northwest end, West Hill (Jefferson) school on the southwest end, Government Springs Park in the middle southern section, and East Hill (Garfield) school on the far northeast corner. A year later, the population was estimated at 4,410, growing to 10,087 in 1907, the year of Oklahoma statehood.

The town's early history was captured in Cherokee Strip: A Tale of an Oklahoma Boyhood by Pulitzer Prize-winning author Marquis James, who recounts his boyhood in Enid.

He writes of the early town:

A trip to Enid was surely a marvelous treat, the stairways one saw being the very least of it. First off, on the edge of the prairie was a house here and house there--and not so many of them sod houses, either. Quite a few were even painted. Pretty soon the stores began, with the buildings touching each other and no front yards at all, only board sidewalks shaded by wooden awnings. Then you came to the Square. You never saw so many rigs or so many people.

— Cherokee Strip: A Tale of an Oklahoma Boyhood

Enid experienced a "golden age" following the discovery of oil in the region in the 1910s and continuing until World War II. Enid's economy boomed as a result of the growing oil, wheat, and rail industries. Its population grew steadily throughout the early 20th century in conjunction with a period of substantial architectural development and land expansion. Enid's downtown had the construction of several buildings including the Broadway Tower, Garfield County Courthouse, and Enid Masonic Temple.

In conjunction with the oil boom, oilmen such as T. T. Eason, H. H. Champlin, and Charles E. Knox built homes in the area. Residential additions during this period include Kenwood, Waverley, Weatherly, East Hill, Kinser Heights, Buena Vista, and McKinley. Union Equity, Continental, Pillsbury, General Mills, and other grain companies operated mills and grain elevators in the area, creating what is now the Enid Terminal Grain Elevators Historic District, and earning Enid the titles of "Wheat Capital of Oklahoma", "Queen Wheat City of Oklahoma," and "Wheat Capital of the United States".

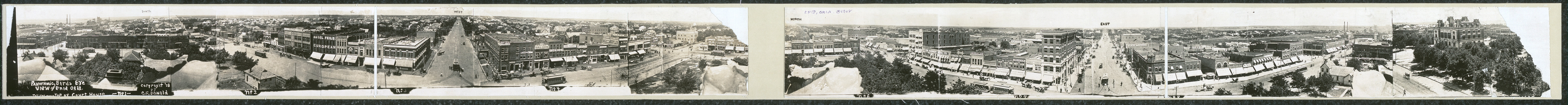
A panorama of Enid, from the top of the courthouse in 1908

== Geography ==
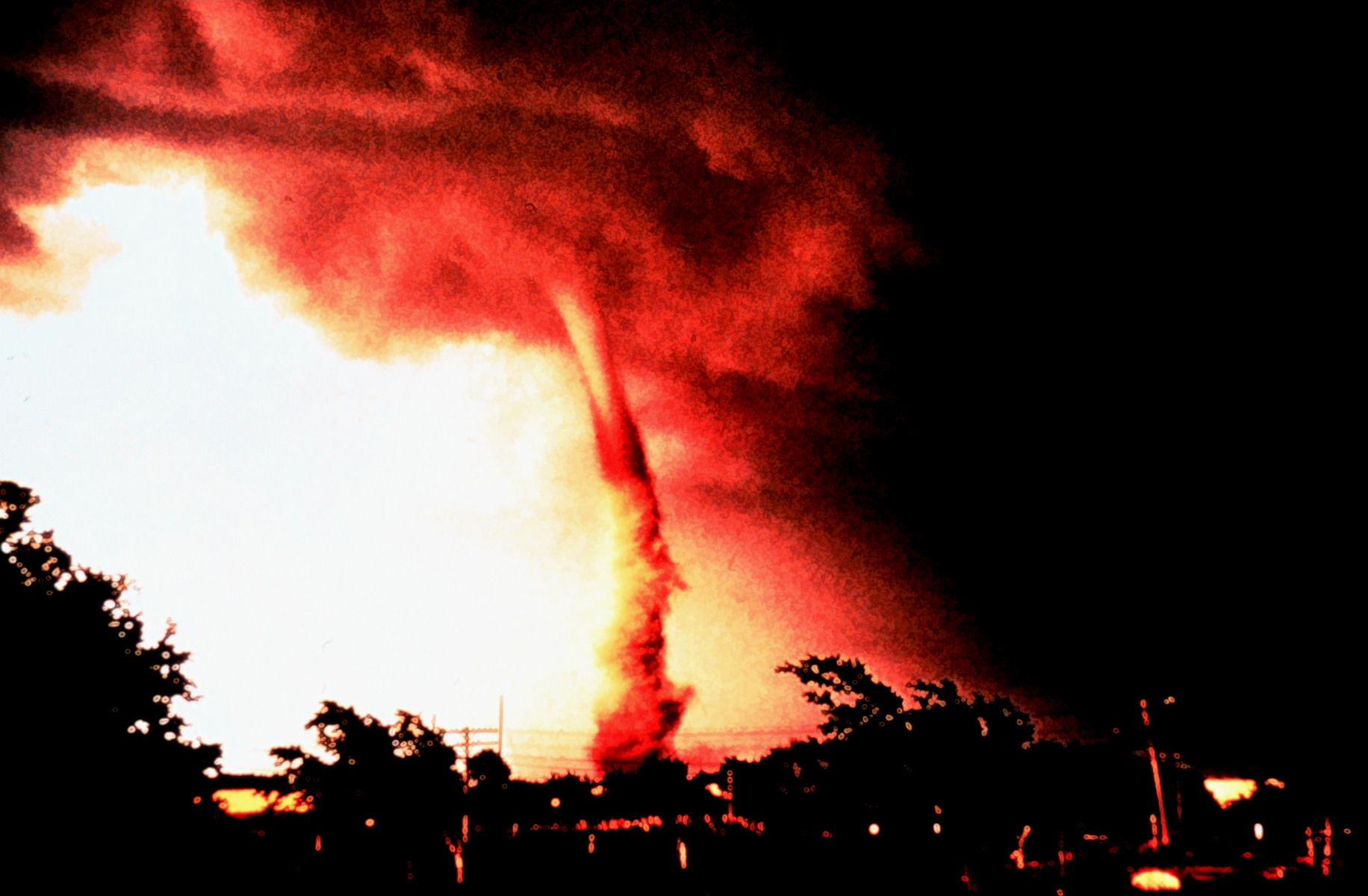
A tornado occurred in Enid on June 5, 1966. For years, this photo was featured on the cover of Weather Service publications on tornadoes and severe weather, and it was the sole tornado photograph in many textbooks.

Located in Northwestern Oklahoma, Enid sits at the eastern edge of the Great Plains. It is located 70 miles (110 km) north of Oklahoma City.

According to the United States Census Bureau, the city has a total area of 74.1 square miles (192 km^{2}), of which 74.0 square miles (192 km^{2}) is land and 0.1 square miles (0.26 km^{2}) (0.12%) is water.

=== Climate ===
Enid's weather conditions are characterized by hot summers, cold, often snowy winters, and thunderstorms in the spring, which can produce tornadoes. The greatest one-day precipitation total by an official rain gauge in Oklahoma was in Enid when 15.68 inches (398.3 mm) fell on October 11, 1973. Temperatures can fall below 0 °F or −17.8 °C in the winter, and reach above 100 °F or 37.8 °C in the summer. The highest recorded temperature was 118 °F (47.8 °C) in 1936. The lowest recorded temperature was −20 °F (−28.9 °C), in 1905. The warmest month is July. January is the coolest month. The maximum average precipitation occurs in June.

Climate data for Enid, Oklahoma (1991–2020 normals, extremes 1894–present)
Month	Jan	Feb	Mar	Apr	May	Jun	Jul	Aug	Sep	Oct	Nov	Dec	Year
Record high °F (°C)	84 (29)	92 (33)	100 (38)	101 (38)	104 (40)	111 (44)	115 (46)	118 (48)	109 (43)	100 (38)	92 (33)	85 (29)	118 (48)
Mean daily maximum °F (°C)	46.7 (8.2)	51.4 (10.8)	61.0 (16.1)	70.1 (21.2)	79.4 (26.3)	89.3 (31.8)	94.8 (34.9)	93.2 (34.0)	85.2 (29.6)	72.9 (22.7)	59.1 (15.1)	48.3 (9.1)	71.0 (21.7)
Daily mean °F (°C)	35.7 (2.1)	39.8 (4.3)	49.0 (9.4)	58.0 (14.4)	68.5 (20.3)	78.2 (25.7)	83.3 (28.5)	81.6 (27.6)	73.5 (23.1)	60.8 (16.0)	48.1 (8.9)	38.0 (3.3)	59.5 (15.3)
Mean daily minimum °F (°C)	24.7 (−4.1)	28.1 (−2.2)	37.0 (2.8)	45.9 (7.7)	57.5 (14.2)	67.1 (19.5)	71.8 (22.1)	70.0 (21.1)	61.7 (16.5)	48.8 (9.3)	37.1 (2.8)	27.8 (−2.3)	48.1 (8.9)
Record low °F (°C)	−14 (−26)	−20 (−29)	0 (−18)	18 (−8)	28 (−2)	43 (6)	50 (10)	45 (7)	33 (1)	17 (−8)	9 (−13)	−10 (−23)	−20 (−29)
Average precipitation inches (mm)	1.04 (26)	1.28 (33)	2.41 (61)	3.42 (87)	4.36 (111)	4.83 (123)	3.34 (85)	3.63 (92)	2.73 (69)	3.06 (78)	1.69 (43)	1.50 (38)	33.29 (846)
Average snowfall inches (cm)	2.4 (6.1)	2.0 (5.1)	1.5 (3.8)	0.0 (0.0)	0.0 (0.0)	0.0 (0.0)	0.0 (0.0)	0.0 (0.0)	0.0 (0.0)	0.0 (0.0)	0.4 (1.0)	3.1 (7.9)	9.4 (24)
Average precipitation days (≥ 0.01 in)	5.2	5.6	7.1	7.8	9.6	8.7	6.7	7.5	6.6	6.4	5.4	5.7	82.3
Average snowy days (≥ 0.1 in)	2.1	1.8	0.9	0.1	0.0	0.0	0.0	0.0	0.0	0.0	0.3	1.8	7.0
Source: NOAA

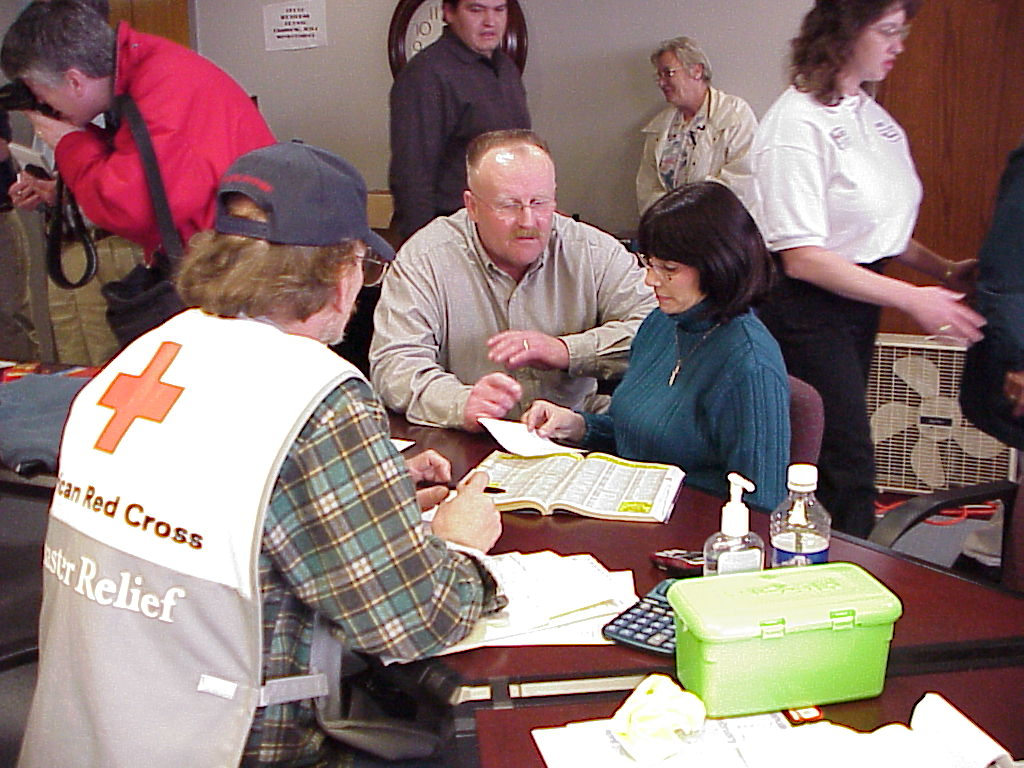
FEMA Director Joe M. Allbaugh talks with a disaster victim at the Red Cross Shelter in Enid during a tour of damage areas in 2002.

An ice storm struck Northwest Oklahoma in late January 2002. The storm caused over $100 million of damage, initially leaving some 255,000 residences and businesses without power. A week later, 39,000 Oklahoma residents were still without power. Enid, with its population of 47,000, was entirely without electricity for days. The Oklahoma Association of Electric Cooperatives reported over 31,000 electrical poles were destroyed across the state. The American Red Cross set up a shelter at Northern Oklahoma College.

Some other notable storms in Enid's history include:

- March 16, 1965: an F4 tornado 18.4 miles (29.6 km) away from the city center injured seven people and caused between $50,000 and $500,000 in damages.
- October 11–13, 1973: Oklahoma's greatest urban rainfall on record occurred. Known as the "Enid flood", an intense thunderstorm was centered over Enid with rainfall accumulations between 15 and 20 inches within a 100-square-mile (260 km^{2}) area. About 12 inches (300 mm) fell in three hours. Enid received 15.68 inches (398 mm), forcing residents to cut holes in rooftops to reach safety. Nine people died.
- May 2, 1979: an F4 tornado 7.5 miles (12.1 km) away from the Enid city center killed one person, injured 25 people and caused between $500,000 and $5,000,000 in damages.
- April 25, 2009: an EF2 tornado damaged the Chisholm Trail Expo Center. No one was injured or killed.
- April 23, 2026: an EF4 tornado, which would be part of a larger tornado and severe weather outbreak struck Vance Air Force Base and southern portions of the city, destroying multiple homes and causing significant damage. At least 10 injuries were reported, with no fatalities. This tornado would spark a tornado emergency. In the end, the tornado had max estimated windspeeds of 180 mph. Later surveys suggested the tornado may have harbored winds exceeding the threshold for EF5 intensity, but the official rating remains at EF4.

== Demographics ==
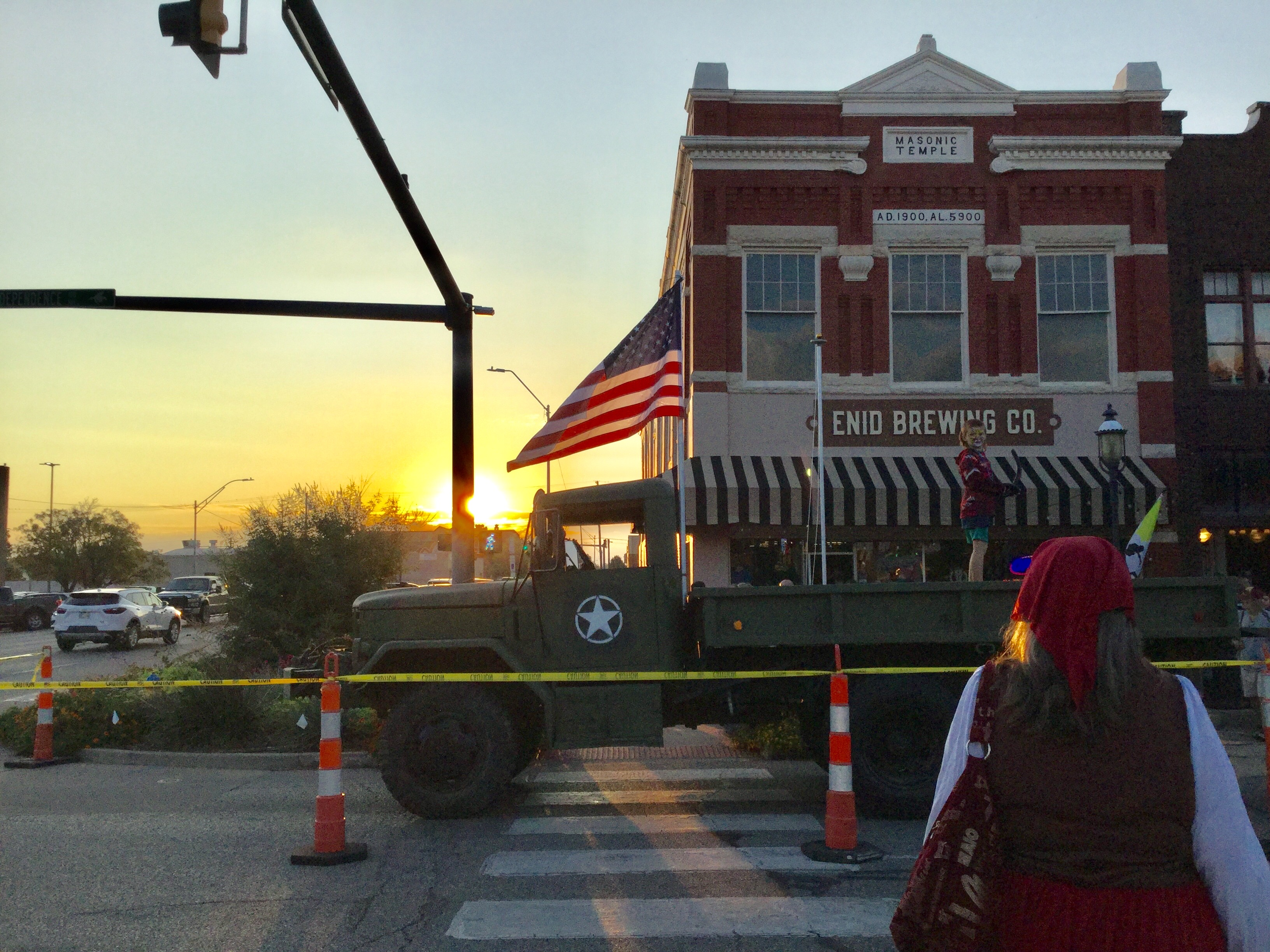
A masonic temple turned brewing company in downtown Enid, Oklahoma.

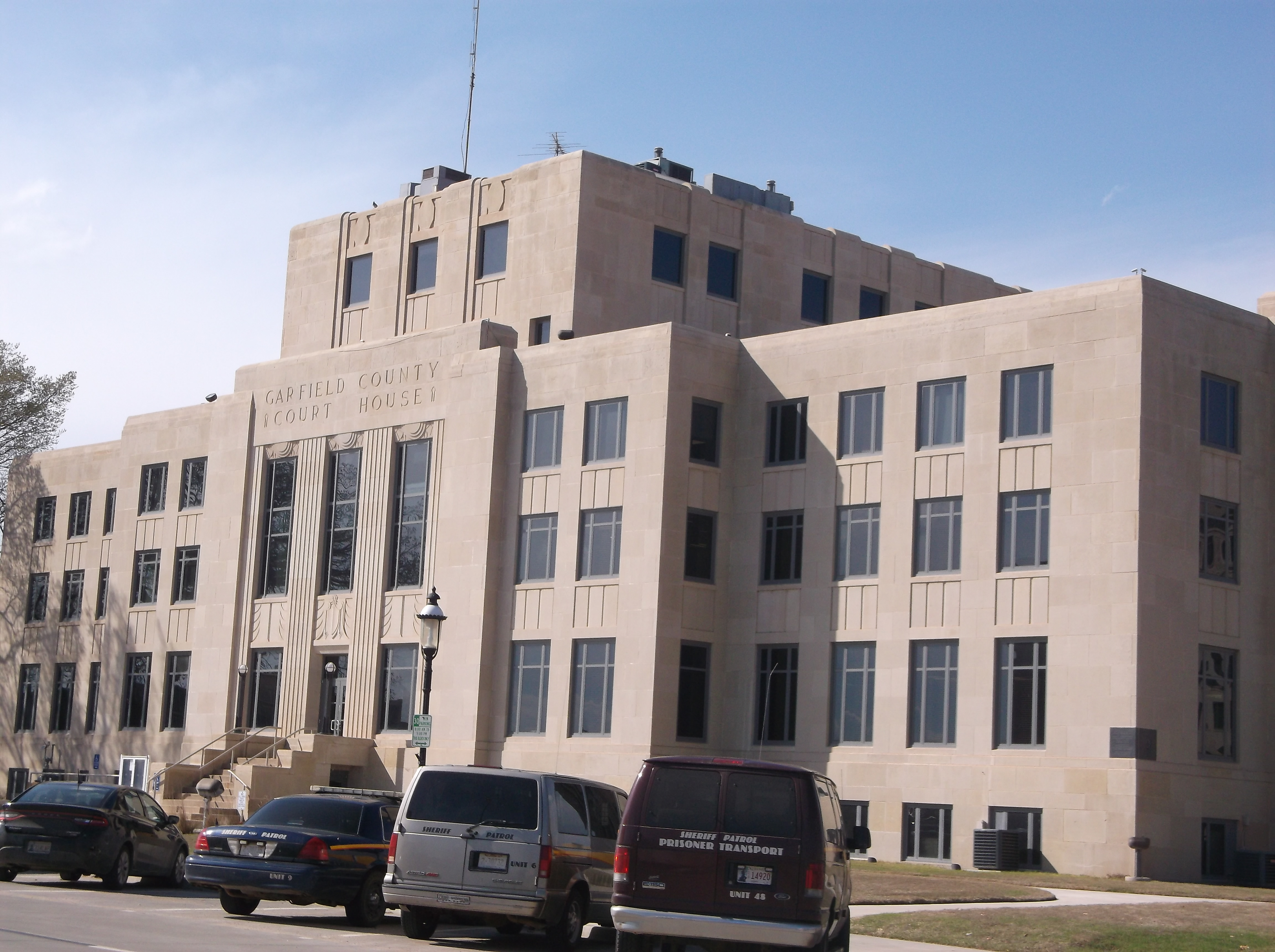
Enid is the county seat of Garfield County, and is home to the county courthouse.

Historical population
Census	Pop.	Note	%±
1900	3,444		—
1910	13,799		300.7%
1920	16,576		20.1%
1930	26,399		59.3%
1940	28,081		6.4%
1950	36,071		28.5%
1960	38,859		7.7%
1970	44,986		15.8%
1980	50,363		12.0%
1990	45,309		−10.0%
2000	47,045		3.8%
2010	49,379		5.0%
2020	51,308		3.9%

=== Racial and ethnic composition ===
Enid city, Oklahoma – Racial and ethnic composition Note: the US Census treats Hispanic/Latino as an ethnic category. This table excludes Latinos from the racial categories and assigns them to a separate category. Hispanics/Latinos may be of any race.
Race / Ethnicity (NH = Non-Hispanic)	2020	2010	2000	1990	1980
White alone (NH)	64.5% (33,088)	77.7% (38,390)	85.3% (40,109)	90.1% (40,827)	92.5% (46,567)
Black alone (NH)	3.2% (1,620)	3.5% (1,722)	3.9% (1,815)	4.4% (1,978)	4% (2,004)
American Indian alone (NH)	2.2% (1,106)	2.1% (1,054)	2.1% (967)	2.2% (992)	1.3% (676)
Asian alone (NH)	1.2% (638)	1.1% (520)	1% (468)	1.2% (537)	0.7% (347)
Pacific Islander alone (NH)	5.6% (2,896)	2.2% (1,075)	0.6% (268)		
Other race alone (NH)	0.2% (128)	0.1% (57)	0.1% (51)	0% (14)	0.1% (57)
Multiracial (NH)	6.8% (3,470)	3% (1,495)	2.4% (1,135)	—	—
Hispanic/Latino (any race)	16.3% (8,362)	10.3% (5,066)	4.7% (2,232)	2.1% (961)	1.4% (712)

=== 2020 census ===
As of the 2020 census, Enid had a population of 51,308, a median age of 35.2 years, and 26.0% of residents were under the age of 18, while 16.2% were 65 years of age or older. For every 100 females there were 98.1 males, and for every 100 females 18 and over, there were 96.9 males. The population density was 693.9 per square mile.

96.2% of residents lived in urban areas, while 3.8% lived in rural areas.

There were 19,733 households in Enid, of which 32.5% had children under the age of 18 living in them. Of all households, 44.7% were married-couple households, 20.4% were households with a male householder and no spouse or partner present, and 27.3% were households with a female householder and no spouse or partner present. About 30.8% of all households were made up of individuals, and 13.3% had someone living alone who was 65 years of age or older.

There were 22,866 housing units, of which 13.7% were vacant. Among occupied housing units, 60.1% were owner-occupied, and 39.9% were renter-occupied. The homeowner vacancy rate was 3.0%, and the rental vacancy rate was 15.7%.

QuickFacts reports an average household size of 2.55, that 49.4% of residents identify as female, 8.3% were foreign born, 13.2% had some form of disability, and 3,365 were veterans.

The most reported ancestries in 2020 were:

- English (18.2%)
- German (15.1%)
- Mexican (13.6%)
- Irish (11.1%)
- Marshallese (5.6%)
- African American (2.9%)
- Scottish (2%)
- Cherokee (2%)
- French (1.6%)
- Italian (1.5%)

Racial composition as of the 2020 census
Race	Percent
White	68.7%
Black or African American	3.3%
American Indian and Alaska Native	2.7%
Asian	1.3%
Native Hawaiian and Other Pacific Islander	5.7%
Some other race	7.6%
Two or more races	10.8%
Hispanic or Latino (of any race)	16.3%

=== Political affiliation ===
Enid has been predominantly a Republican stronghold since its days as part of Oklahoma Territory, owing to the influence of settlers from neighboring Kansas. Enid was named one of the top 10 most conservative cities in America in 2021 with over 60% of voters registering as Republicans.

Several politicians have called Enid home, including Oklahoma Territory's last governor Frank Frantz; U.S. Representative Page Belcher; US Congressman and former Enid mayor, Milton C. Garber; Oklahoma Lieutenant Governor Todd Lamb; U.S. Representative George H. Wilson; and James Yancy Callahan, the only non-Republican territorial congressional delegate. In 2023 Enid elected a former organizer for Identity Evropa who was at the 2017 Charlottesville Unite the Right rally to its city commission, who was recalled and defeated in 2024.

=== Religious affiliation ===
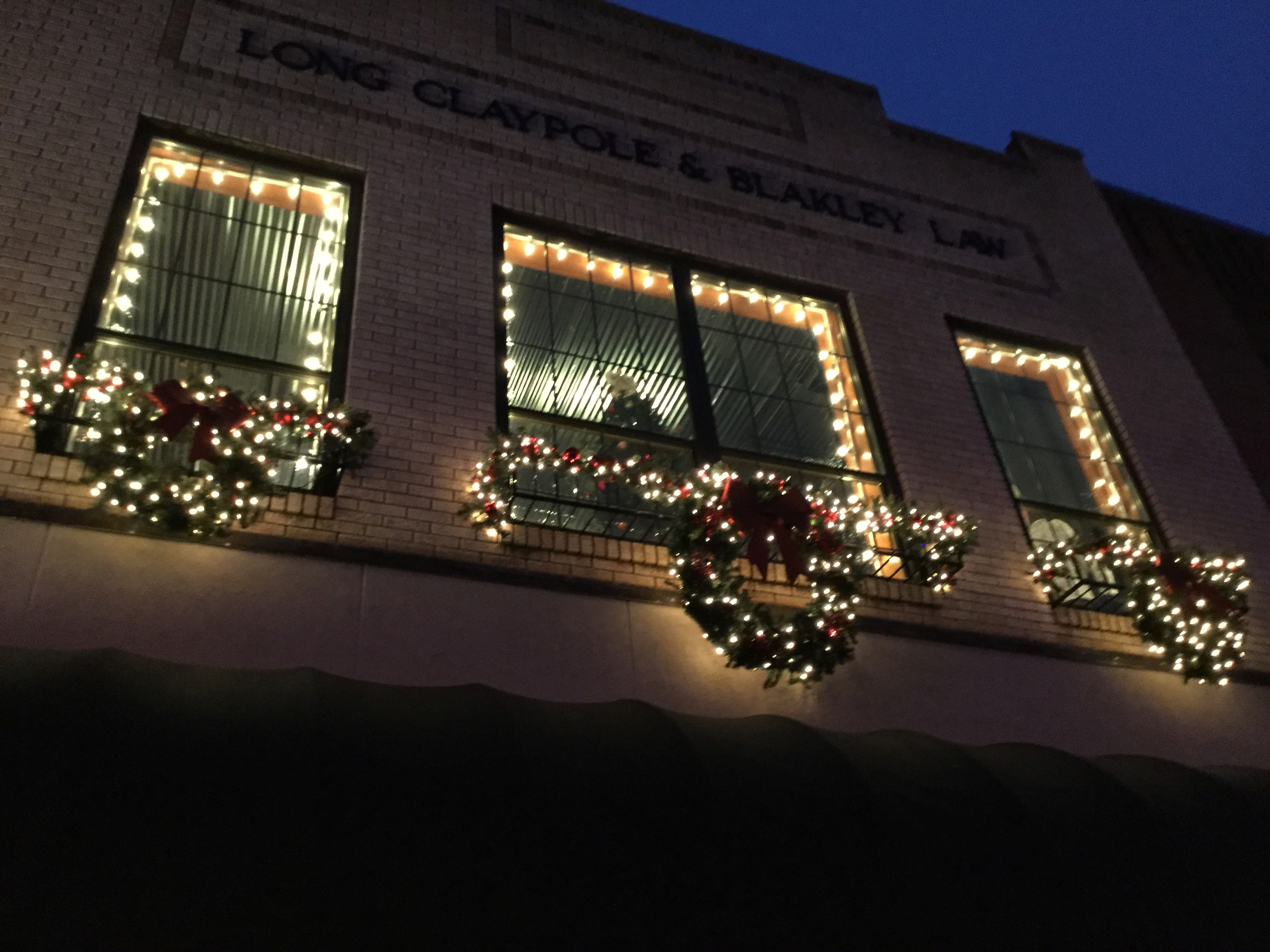
A business in downtown Enid decorated for the winter holiday season

Of the people in Enid, 61.9% claim affiliation with a religious congregation; 9.4% are Catholic, 39.2% are Protestant, 1.1% are Latter Day Saints and 12.2% are another Christian denomination. In 1987, there were 90 churches of 27 different denominations of Christianity. Downtown Enid boasted the world's largest fresh cut Christmas tree in 2021 and 2022, which was placed downtown in time for the annual Enid Lights Up the Plains festival.

Enid's Phillips University, formally affiliated with the Disciples of Christ, was a product of religious collaboration between followers of the Disciples of Christ, Presbyterian Church, and Judaism. Although Phillips University has closed, Enid still has a number of private Christian schools, including St. Paul's Lutheran School, Oklahoma Bible Academy, St. Joseph Catholic School, and Emmannuel Christian School.

The first Methodist circuit rider to arrive in Enid was the Reverend O. R. Bryant. This minister preached to a congregation of early settlers on Sunday, September 17, 1893, the day after the great run into the Cherokee Strip. The service was held on the courthouse lawn and was the first Protestant sermon delivered in Enid. This was the beginning of the First Methodist Church in Enid.

Enid has two Catholic congregations: St. Francis Xavier, founded in 1893, and St. Gregory, founded in 1971. St. Francis Xavier's Bishop Theophile Meerschaert was responsible for founding Calvary Catholic Cemetery in 1898. Enid is home to several Protestant churches. It has four Lutheran congregations: Immanuel, founded in 1899, Trinity, founded in 1901, St. Paul, founded in 1909, and Redeemer, founded in 1934.

Enid has several historically Black churches, including St. Stephen African Methodist Episcopal Church, First Missionary Baptist Church, and West Side Church of God in Christ (COGIC). The Southern Heights Ministerial Alliance brings local Black clergy together. Enid has two churches serving its Korean population, the Enid Korean Church of Grace and Peace United Methodist. Iglesia Cristiana El Shaddai, a Disciples of Christ congregation founded in 2001, serves the area Hispanic community. Enid Faith Ways Church is LGBTQ friendly.

Enid also has a small Bahá’í congregation that often meets in congregants' homes and serves some of Enid's Marshallese population.

Between 1925 and 1930 Enid was home to a small Jewish congregation called Emanuel, which met at the Loewen Hotel, founded by Al Loewen, a local merchant who served on the committee to create Phillips University. Lacking a synagogue building members of the Jewish community have held services at Convention Hall and local Masonic Temples, or by traveling to synagogues in other cities.

The Enid Cemetery has a Jewish section where many of early Enid's Jewish merchants are interred, including the founders of Kaufman's Style Shop, Herzberg's Department Store, Newman Mercantile, and Meibergen and Godschalk, Enid's first clothing store. During the Oklahoma territorial era, Enid elected Jewish resident Joseph Meibergen in 1897 as mayor. Enid was home to the Northwest Oklahoma chapter of the B'nai B'rith founded in 1926, the Enid Jewish Women's Council met in the 1930s and 1940s, and the Enid Jewish Chautauqua held programs as early as 1910.

Enid is the home of two Masonic Lodges, the Enid Lodge #80 and the Garfield Lodge #501. The Enid Lodge has many Jewish members.

=== Marshallese population ===
In 2014, Enid was the city with the fourth largest Marshallese population in the United States.

A push factor from the Marshall Islands was nuclear testing at Bikini Atoll. Missionaries from Phillips University visited the Marshall Islands, and Marshallese students at Phillips were among the first settlers from the island country. There were also significant numbers who worked at food plants from Advance Foods, now Tyson Foods. There were others who worked at Walmart. The Compact of Free Association allowed Marshallese to begin moving to Enid sometime circa 1987. In 2022 there were 2,800 Marshallese in Enid.

Initially Enid's Marshallese were younger. By the 21st century many elderly Marshallese came for medical care, and many of them died at younger ages than other elderly people due to health problems stemming from fallout from the nuclear tests and from poor diets; the nuclear tests made traditional Marshallese food inaccessible due to radiation, so U.S. junk food rations became a major element in the Marshallese diet. Since 1996, Marshallese citizens were unable to get health programs offered by the federal government due to the Personal Responsibility and Work Opportunity Act changing relevant laws. The Oklahoma government has the ability to allow Marshallese citizens in its state borders to get access to these federal health programs, but it chooses not to do so.

It is common for Marshallese in Enid to frequently change residences. As many Marshallese have not obtained U.S. citizenship, they lack power in governance. Business ownership and management are not common among Marshallese in Enid.

In 2014, there were 381 students in Enid Public Schools who were Marshallese in English language learner programs. Two of the elementary schools had at least 25% of their students being Marshallese ELL students. In 2017, the district had two liaisons for the Marshallese population. In 2017, 200 of the students at Enid High School were Marshallese. From 2014, the school had a student club where Marshallese students taught the overall student population about their culture. Longfellow Middle School also had such a club.

The Marshallese United Church of Christ is in Enid.

The 2024 documentary 67 Bombs to Enid deals with the relocation to Enid of Marshallese survivors of multiple nuclear tests in their islands.

=== African-American population ===
The neighborhoods of Southern Heights and East Park are historically Black neighborhoods in Enid. African-Americans have lived in Enid since the time of the September 1893 Land Run. Members of the Black community soon founded two Baptist churches in 1893, Grayson Missionary Baptist Church, and the First Baptist Church. St. Stephen's African Methodist Episcopal Church would follow in 1909. In 1996 Enid's First Missionary Baptist Church burned down in a fire during a spate of hate crimes across the American South. The community came together and rebuilt the church. The area near Government Springs Park became an area of Black settlement, coalescing beside these nearby institutions of community life. Prominent citizens of the Black community in early Enid included attorney Devotion Banks, Reverend Louis Johnson, Doctor Ollie Penny, Reverend Moses Ireland, and Reverend William Humphrey. Many Black citizens belonged to the Knights of Pythias fraternal organization.

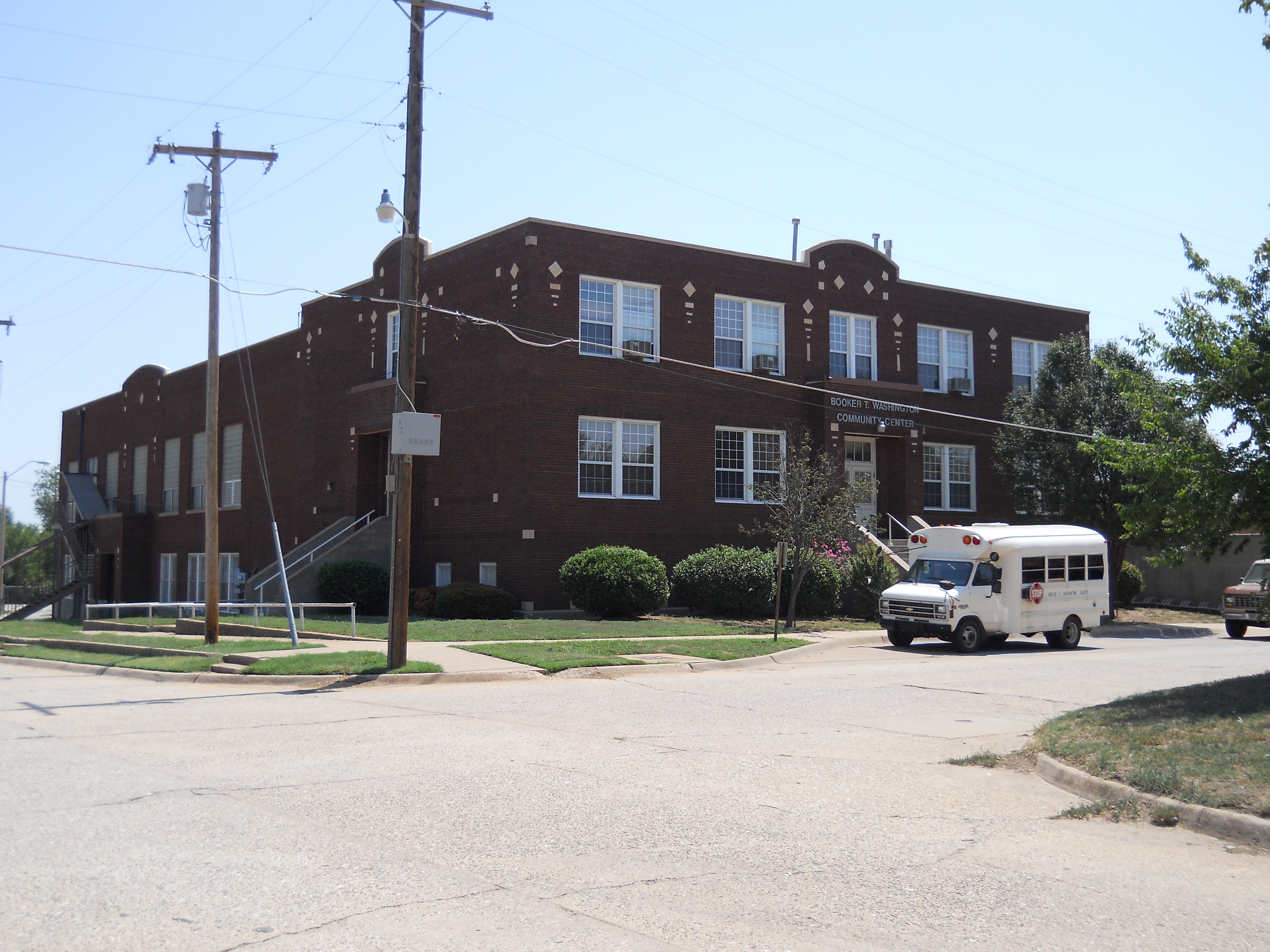
The former Booker T. Washington School is now a community center in Enid.

Booker T. Washington school was founded in 1896 with a brick school house erected in 1901. The school provided elementary through high school education for Black residents. Washington school was joined by Douglas elementary from 1918 to 1920 and George Washington Carver elementary in 1949. Having previously denied access to Black university students, Phillips University changed its policies after the Brown v. Board of Education ruling. In 1947 despite having no Black classmates, students at Phillips formed a chapter of the NAACP. The first instance of integration in Enid’s public school system occurred in June 1955 when two Black high school students, Leonard Harrison and Ralph Ballard, attended summer school at Emerson Junior High. Enid High School accepted its first Black students in the fall semester of 1955. Enid's public schools were not fully integrated until 1969 when Enid closed the elementary schools in the Southern Heights neighborhood and children were bussed to other schools. Citing economics and no foreign language education, the Enid School Board closed Booker T. Washington in 1960, and its 43 students were integrated into the wider school system. Despite strides forward in integrating local educational institutions, local restaurants and drug store lunch counters refused service to Black citizens. In 1958 the Black community organized sit-ins and held meetings between the Enid Negro Chamber of Commerce and the Enid Restauranteurs Association, but the effort failed. The restaurant owners used laws against loitering as grounds to notify police. Another sit-in occurred in May 1963 prior to the passage of the Civil Rights Act which integrated restaurants nationwide.

Another historically Black neighborhood nicknamed "Two Street" existed between South Second Street and South Grand Avenue near the Rock Island railroad tracks. The area was considered a Red Light district with gambling halls, saloons, and brothels. Despite statewide alcohol prohibition in Oklahoma, liquor sales were rampant across town. On July 31, 1917, Judge John C. Moore ordered that residents be evicted and the buildings condemned. Enid appointed its first Black policeman, Henry Backstrom, in the 1920s. Mr. Backstrom had previously served as principal of the Washington school for 11 years. Backstrom was acquitted after killing Fred Williams, a Black resident of Two Street, in the line of duty. He continued to serve for six years before studying at Langston University, and returning to the education field. Former Deputy Sheriff Lon Crosslin was injured during a gunfight while attempting to prevent a jewelry store robbery. Crosslin killed the two Black suspects, but the Klan justified collective punishment of the residents in retaliation for Crosslin's injury, issuing orders for residents of the Two Street district to leave Garfield County. Local police refused to protect Black residents and ordered them to obey the Klan. On October 26, 1921, a portion of Enid's Black population was driven out by the Klan. An estimated 1,000 members of the Klan held a car parade at midnight, and nearly two dozen Black citizens left town. Local Reverend A.G. Smith, Mayor William H. Ryan, former Deputy Sheriff Lon Crosslin, and the Enid Daily Eagle editorial staff praised the action. The mayor routinely received death threats for his public support of the action. Some Black residents resisted, returning to town only to be met by threats from the Klan. By 1922 at least ten former residents of the neighborhood had moved to the neighborhood by Government Springs Park. The Klan held additional parades through downtown Enid in 1922 and 1924. At least two Black men were tarred and feathered in separate incidents by the Klan in Enid in the 1920s, including Ed Warner and Walter O'Banion. There were additional reports of Klan activity in Enid in 1979 and 1985. On September 21, 1979, an 18 year old Black Enid High School student and football player named Mitchell Lee Sanford was hung from a tree. While local police ruled it a suicide, the FBI investigated it as a hate crime due to a recent resurgence in local Klan activity.

Enid's chapter of the NAACP was founded in 1941 by local educator Lewis J. Umstead who served as its president until 1952. The group organized a freedom rally in 1963. The NAACP has held multiple Oklahoma state conventions in Enid. Enid has named streets for notable Black citizens, including opera singer Leona Mitchell in 1981 and professional athlete Lydell Carr in 2023. In 1990 Enid named its municipal building for Dr. Martin Luther King, Jr., and in 1991 a monument bearing a quote from his "I have a dream" speech was erected on the property. An annual march is held in Enid honoring Dr. King. In 2020 residents of Enid participated in protests for Black Lives Matter.

In 2023 Ward 1 elected City Commissioner Judson Blevins, a white nationalist organizer with Identity Evropa, who marched at the Unite the Right rally. Local NAACP leader Lanita Norwood is a founding member of the Enid Social Justice Committee which has actively protested against Blevins, and initiated a recall election for April 2024. Blevins was defeated in the recall, replaced by Cheryl Patterson.

== Economy ==
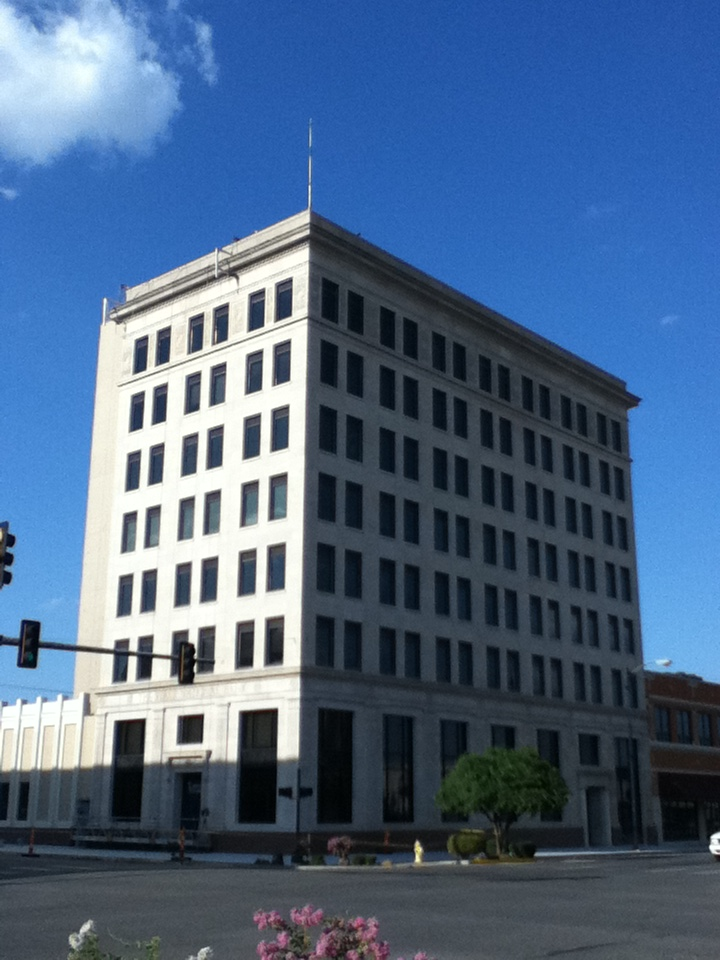
The First National Bank of Enid was another venture by oilman H.H. Champlin. During the Great Depression, it earned the distinction of being the only bank ever to be forcibly closed by the military.

When Enid participated in the City Beautiful movement in the 1920s, Frank Iddings wrote the city song, "Enid, The City Beautiful". "You're right in the center where the best wheat grows and you've got your share of the oil that flows," his lyrics read. These were the early staples of the Enid economy. Enid's economy saw oil booms and agricultural growth in the first half of the 20th century.

The Great Depression caused both of these staples to lose value, and many businesses in Enid closed. Enid recovered, prospering and growing in population until a second wave of bad economic times hit in the 1980s, when competition with the local mall and economic factors led Enid's downtown area to suffer. Since 1994, Enid's Main Street program has worked to refurbish historic buildings, boost the local economy, and initiate local events such as first Friday concerts and holiday celebrations on the town square.

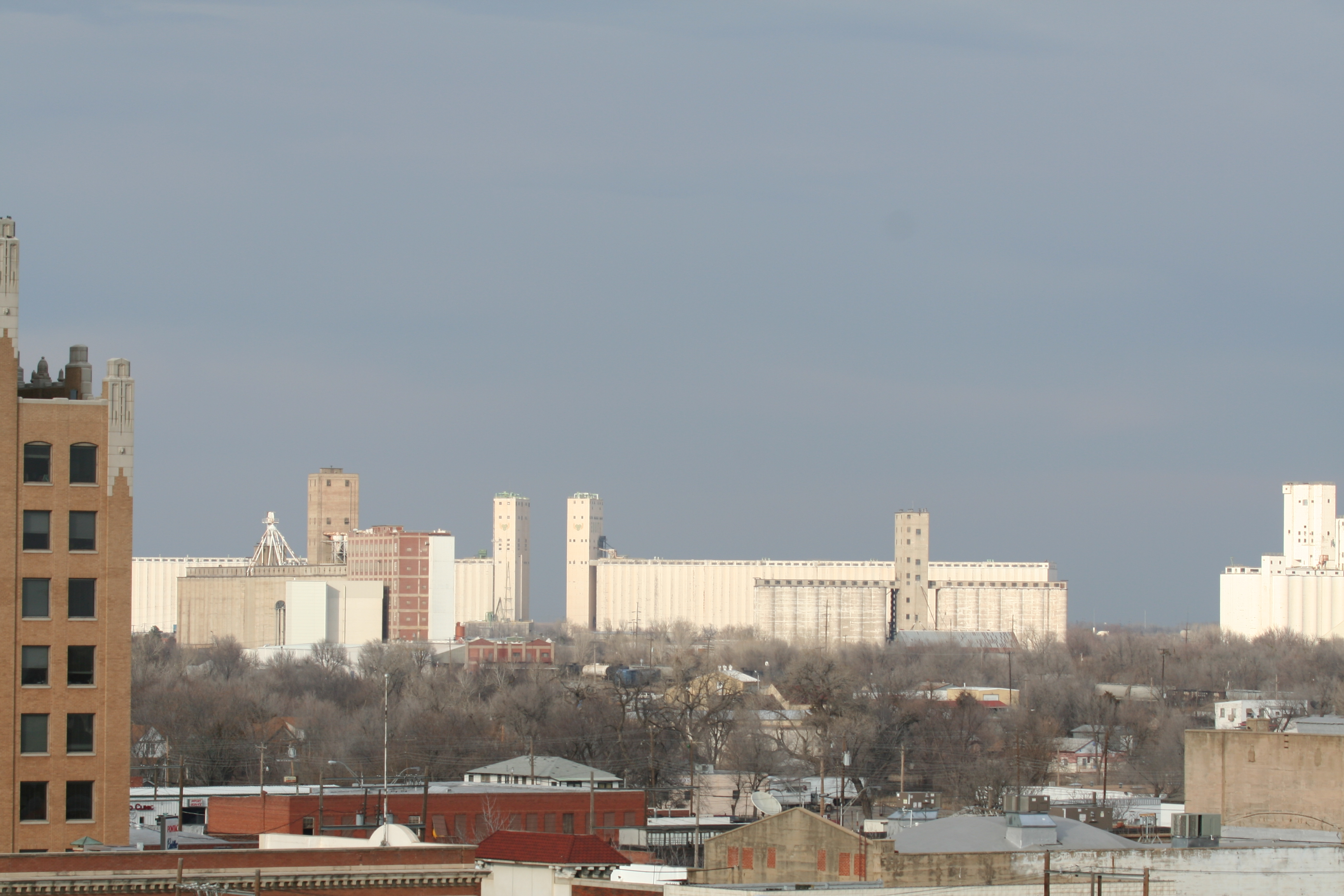
Enid holds the title of having the most grain storage capacity in the United States.

Companies with corporate headquarters in Enid:

- AdvancePierre Foods (prepared food products, primarily for institutional customers)
- Atwood Distributing, LP (farming supplies, hardware, pet supplies)
- Johnston Enterprises Inc. (grain processing, storage, and transportation; founded 1893)
- Pumpstar (manufacturer of concrete pumping equipment)
- Groendyke Transport (tank truck fleet operator; bulk liquid transport)

Companies with operations in Enid:

- The Koch Industries plant produces 10 percent of the anhydrous ammonia in the United States, a primary ingredient in fertilizer.
- Arctic Slope Regional Corporation provides base operations services at nearby Vance Air Force Base.
- Vertex provides aircraft maintenance services at Vance Air Force Base.

Historical companies in Enid:

- Champlin Oil Company: The company was founded in 1916 by H.H. Champlin and grew to operate service stations in 20 different states by 1944. In 1984, after a series of different owners, American Petrofina closed the operation. What remains is the H. H. Champlin Mansion, one of many Enid sites listed on the National Register of Historic Places.
- Geronimo Motor Company

=== Water pipeline to Enid from Kaw Lake ===
In 2020, the city of Enid began a multi-million dollar project to lay 70 miles of pipeline to transport 10 million gallons of water a day from Kaw Lake to a booster pump station in Enid. The pipeline is expected to provide a water to the city of Enid for the next 40–50 years. The city of Enid received $205 million in funding from the state of Oklahoma in December 2020, as part of its water pipeline project, the city's most expensive project ever.

In February 2021, the U.S. Army Corps of Engineers approved a National Environmental Policy Act Environmental Assessment led by the City of Enid and Garver for the Enid Kaw Lake Water Supply Program. The USACE's Finding of No Significant Impact (FONSI) means that the program has taken a significant step toward construction set to begin in the first half of 2021.

In June 2021, construction began at the lake's intake facility in Osage County on the vertical intake shaft, which then will micro-tunnel into the lake to gain access. The project's design engineering firm announced that nearly all the necessary land has been acquired for the 70-mile pipeline with 223 parcels of land accepted of the 230 total land parcels needed for the pipeline portion of the project.

== Arts and culture ==
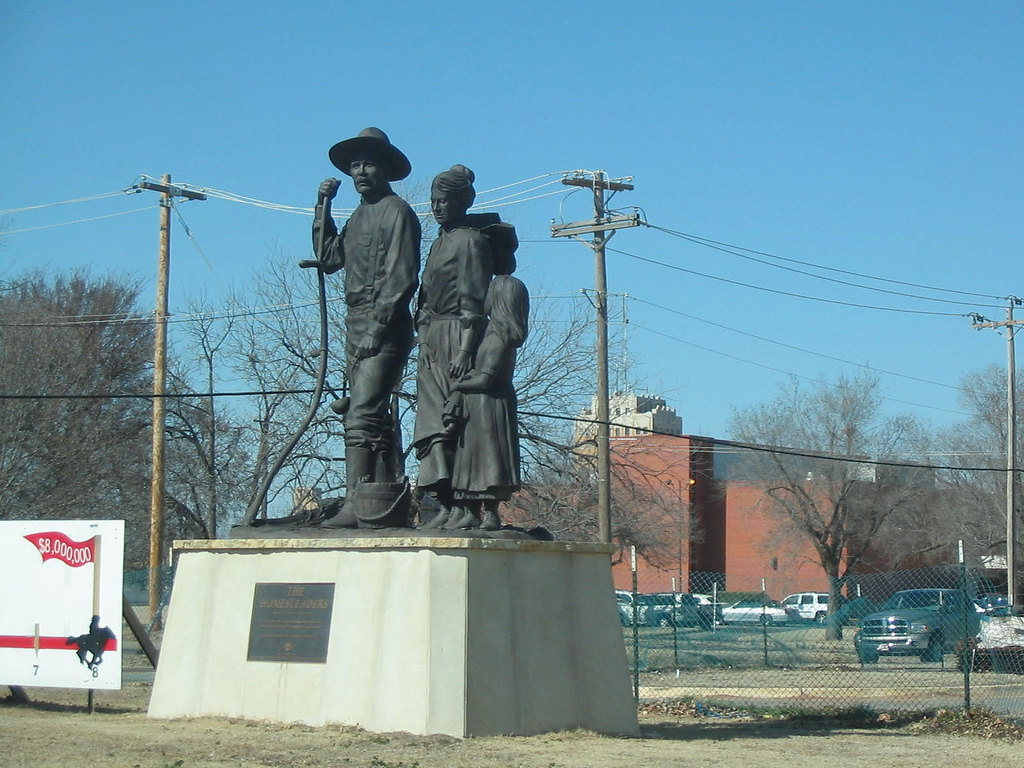
The Pioneer Family Statue by local artist, Harold Holden, outside the Cherokee Strip Regional Heritage Center.

Enid is home to the annual Tri-State Music Festival which was started in 1932 by Russell L. Wiley, who was Phillips University band director from 1928 to 1934. From 1933 to 1936, Edwin Franko Goldman headlined the festival. The festival takes place each spring in Enid.

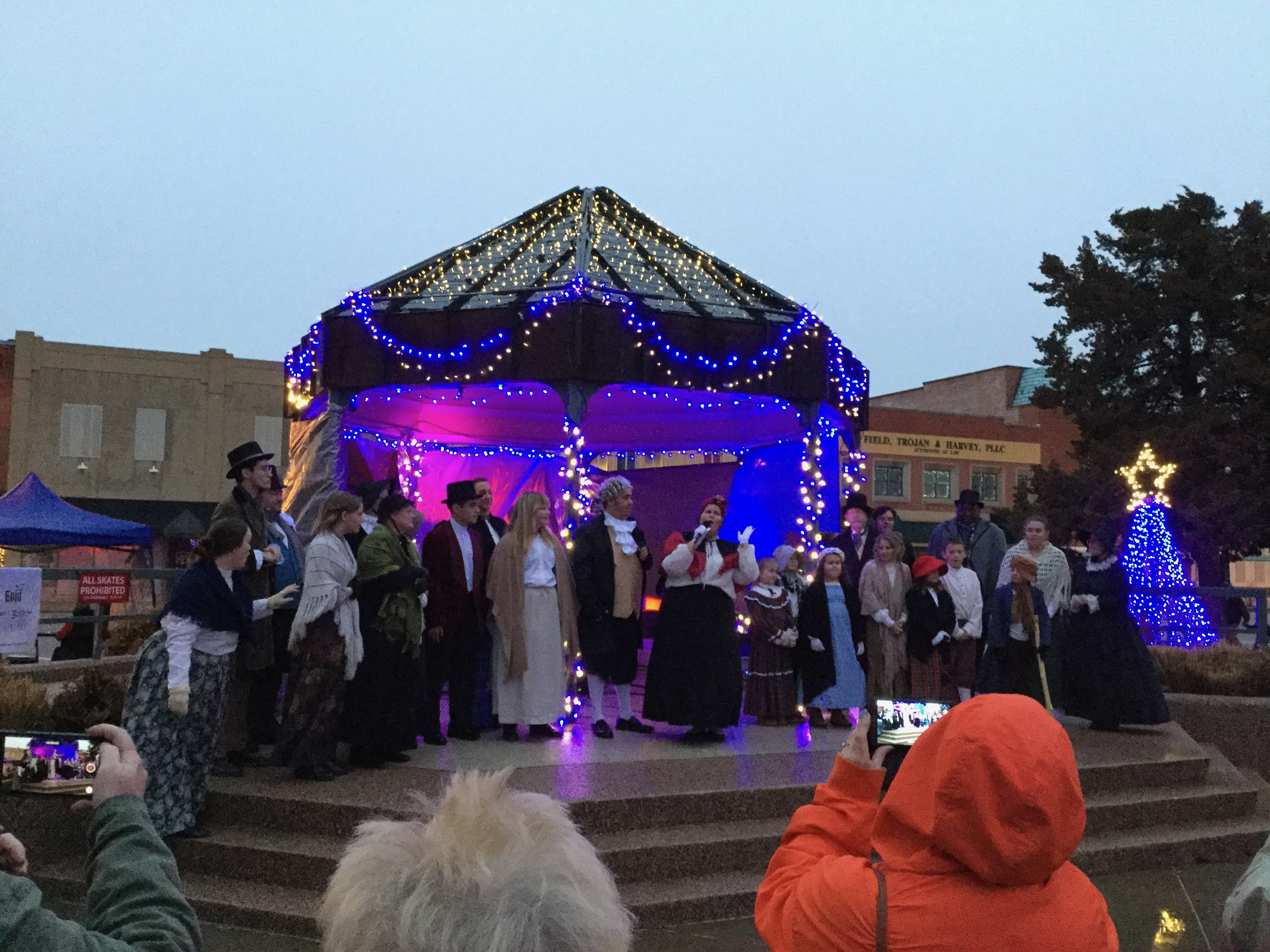
Actors from Gaslight Theatre at the Gazebo in downtown Enid, Oklahoma, during Enid Lights Up the Plains

In the summer, Enid's Gaslight Theatre hosts a production of Shakespeare in the Park, as well as year-round theater productions. The Enid Symphony Orchestra was formed in 1905 and is the oldest symphony in the state, performing year-round in the Enid Symphony Center. Enid's Chautauqua in the Park takes place each summer in Government Springs Park, providing five nights of educational performances by scholars portraying prominent historical figures. The Chautauqua program was brought to Enid in 1907 by the Enid Circle Jewish Chautauqua, and is now produced by the Greater Enid Arts and Humanities Council.

Enid's Cherokee Strip Regional Heritage Center preserves the local history of the Land Run of 1893, Phillips University, and Garfield County. The museum originated as the Museum of the Cherokee Strip in the 1970s, and reopened in April 2011. Enid also commemorates its land run history each September by hosting the Cherokee Strip Days and Parade. The Humphrey Heritage Village next to the museum offers visitors a chance to see the original Enid land office and other historical buildings.

Visitors to Enid's Railroad Museum of Oklahoma, located in the former Santa Fe Railway Depot, can see railroad memorabilia, explore historical trains, and watch model railroads in action. The Midgley Museum is operated by the Enid Masonic Lodge #80 and features the rock collection of the Midgley family. Leonardo's Discovery Warehouse, located in the former Alton Mercantile building in downtown Enid, is an arts and sciences museum, which features Adventure Quest, an outdoor science-themed playground. Simpson's Old Time Museum is a Western-themed museum by local filmmakers Rick and Larry Simpson. The pair closed their downtown business, Simpson's Mercantile, in 2006 to convert the building into a movie set and museum.

George's Antique Auto Museum features the sole existing Geronimo car, once manufactured in Enid. The Leona Mitchell Southern Heights Heritage Center and Museum records the history and culture of African Americans and Native Americans, featuring exhibits on Enid's former black schools (George Washington Carver and Booker T. Washington), and opera star Leona Mitchell. Enid also has 26 of the 32 sites on the National Register of Historic Places listings in Garfield County, Oklahoma.

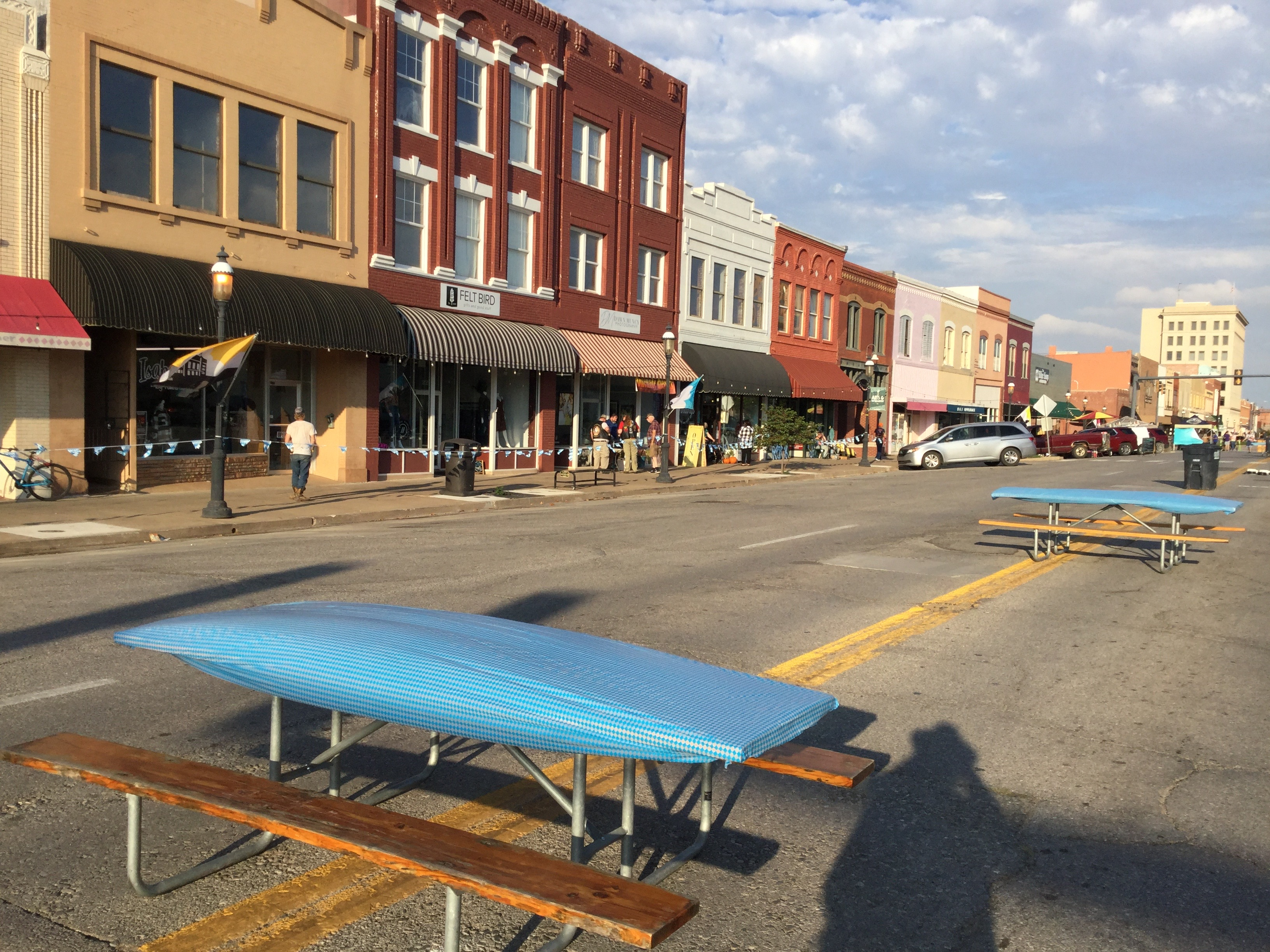
Downtown Enid during Oktoberfest

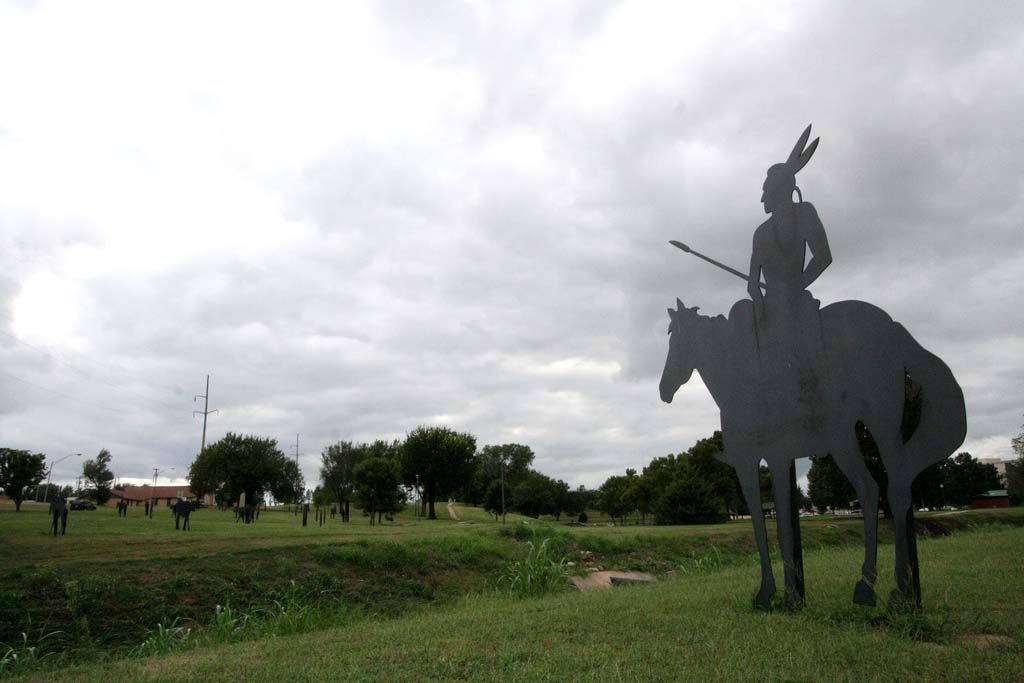
Government Springs Park in Enid was originally a watering hole on the Old Chisholm Cattle Trail.

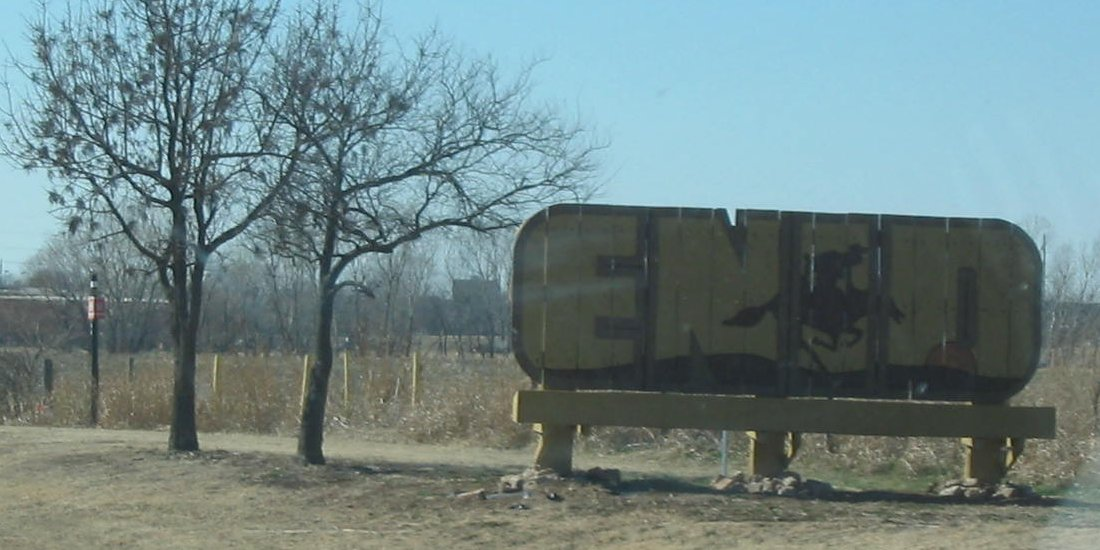
A sign welcoming visitors to Enid

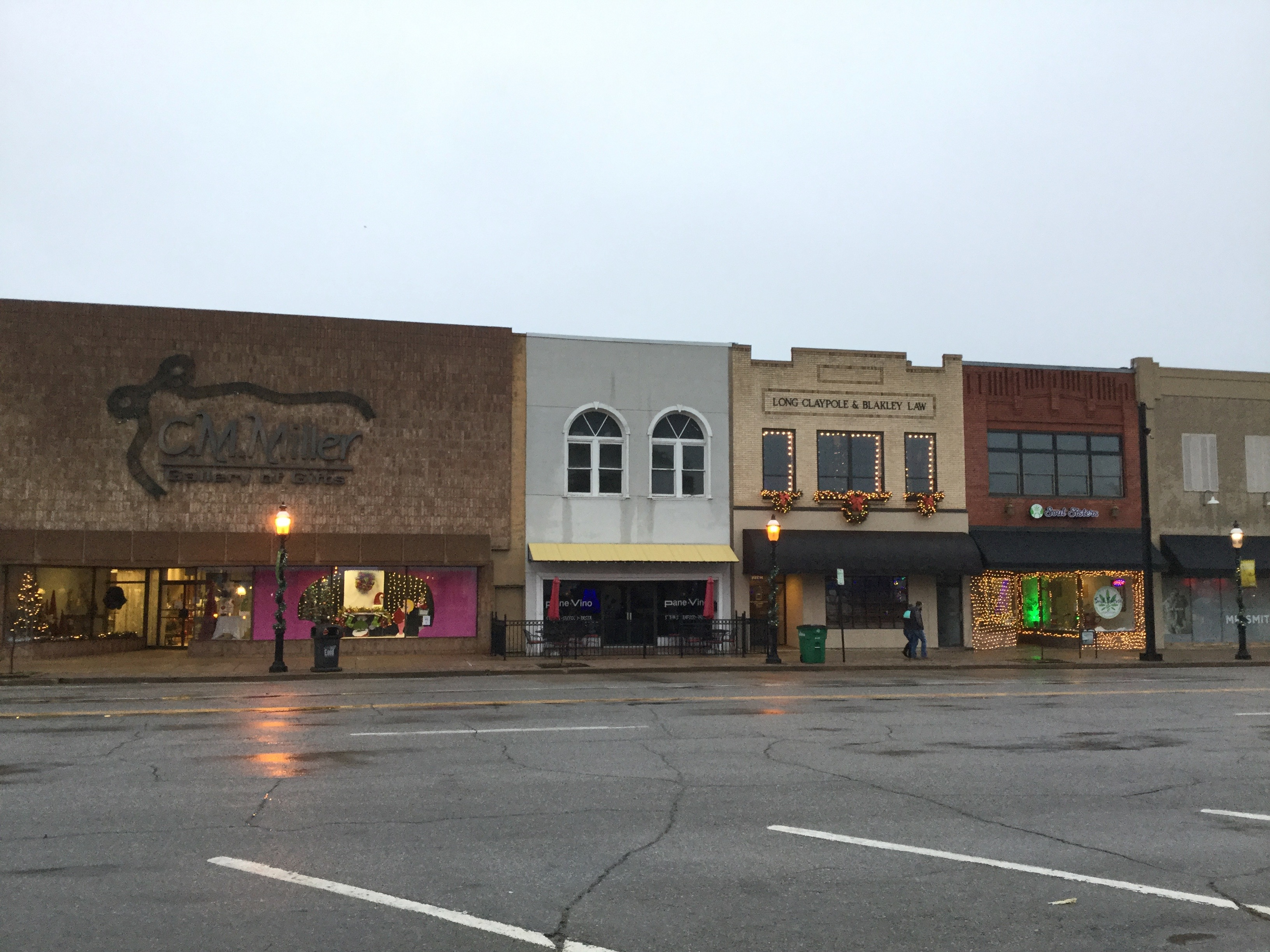
Downtown Enid in winter

== Parks and recreation ==
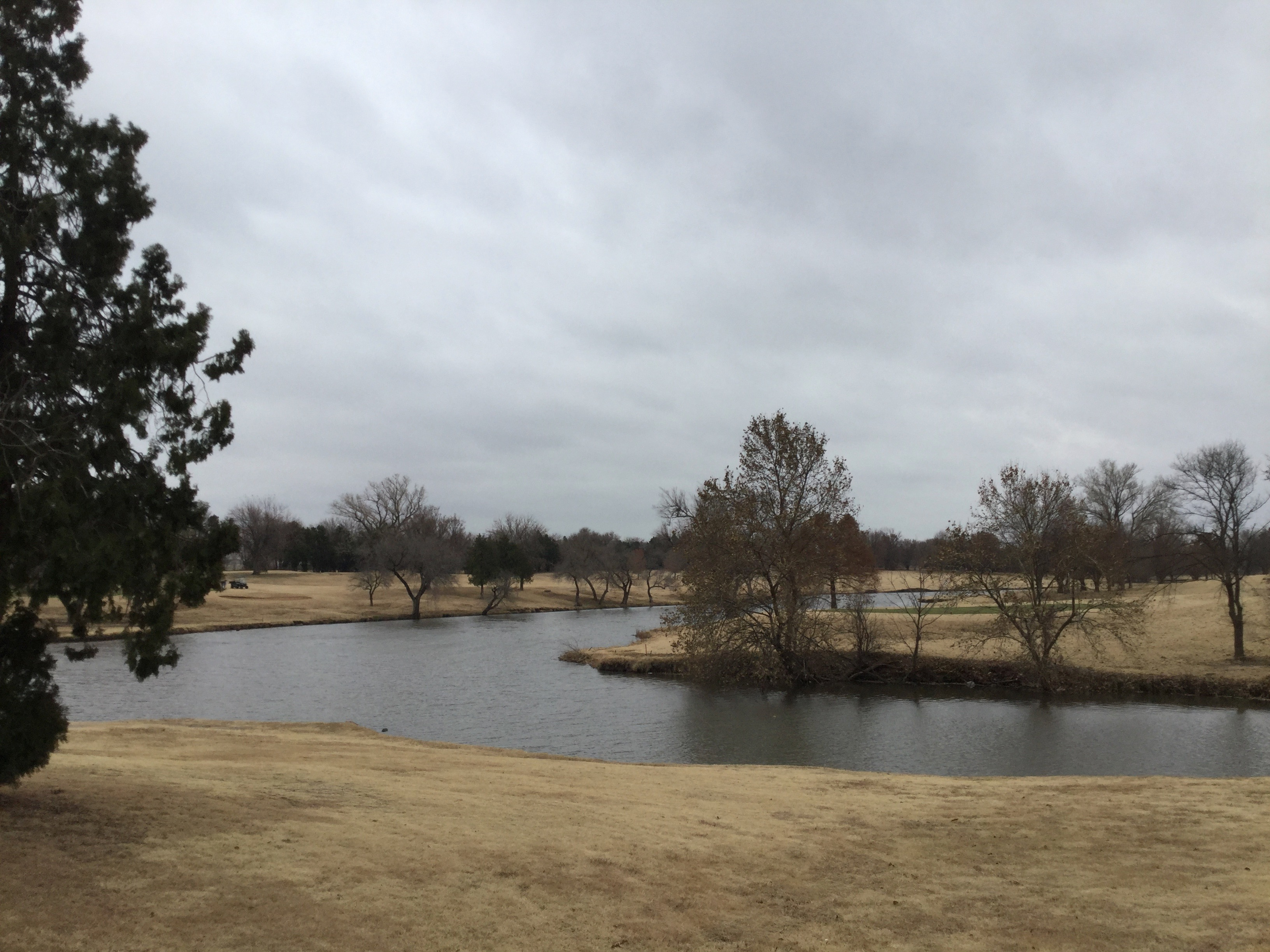
Meadowlake Park in Enid

Government Springs Park, also known as North Government Springs Park, was Enid's first park. Originally a watering hole on the Old Chisholm Cattle Trail, the park is built around a lake and includes the Dillingham Gardens, picnic pavilions, playground equipment, a performing arts pavilion, and more.

South Government Springs Park contains a sports complex with football fields complete with lights, two softball complexes with lights, and two tennis complexes made up of four lighted courts each.

The City of Enid maintains 25 additional parks or facilities including two splash pads, a pool, a bike park and a bird sanctuary.

The Great Salt Plains State Park, Great Salt Plains Lake, and Salt Plains National Wildlife Refuge are to the northwest. Canton Lake is the southwest. Sooner Lake is to the east. Carl Blackwell Lake is to the southeast.

== Sports ==
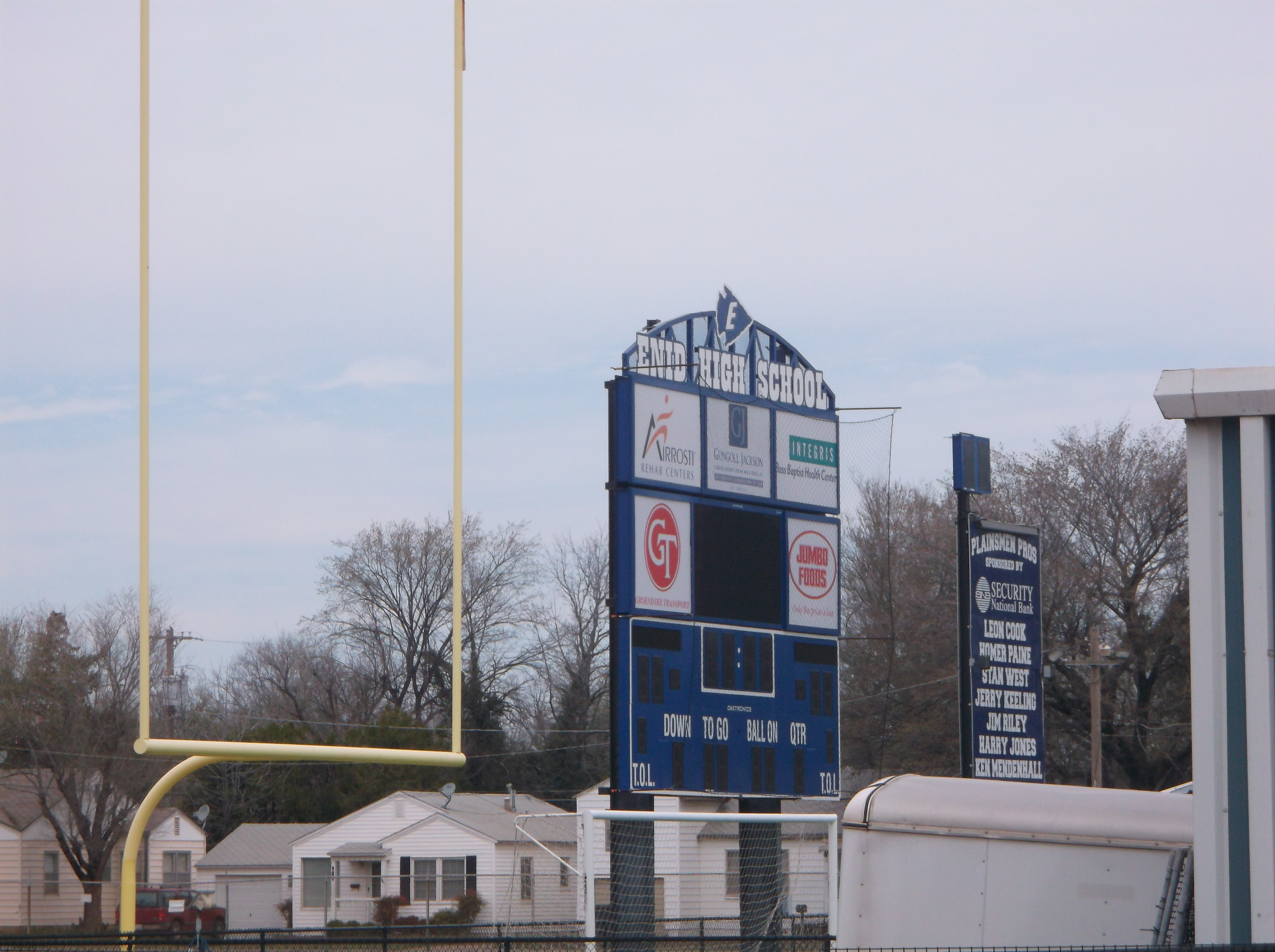
D. Bruce Selby Football Stadium

Enid has produced several athletes, including NFL football players Todd Franz, Steve Fuller, Ken Mendenhall, John Ward, Jeff Zimmerman, and Jim Riley; and the CFL's Kody Bliss. Brothers Brent Price and Mark Price became NBA players, and Don Haskins is a Hall of Fame basketball coach. USSF soccer player Andrew Hoxie; Major League Baseball pitchers Ray Hayward and Lou Kretlow; Olympian and runner Chris McCubbins; and Stacy Prammanasudh, an LPGA golfer, all were born or lived in Enid.

=== Baseball ===
The Enid Harvesters (active from 1920 to 1924) were named as the 20th-best minor league farm team ever by Minor League Baseball. They had a 104–27 record in the 1922 season. The Harvesters, along with their earlier counterparts the Enid Railroaders, were members of the Western Association. During the 1951 season, the team was an affiliate of the Houston Buffaloes, and were known as the Enid Buffaloes to match.

The Enid Majors youth baseball team won the American Legion Baseball World Series in 2005.

Several Enid teams played in the National Baseball Congress championships, winning the championship in 1945 by the Army Air Field (runners up in 1943 and 1944), in 1940 and 1941 by the Champlins, and in 1937 by the Eason Oilers (runners up in 1938).

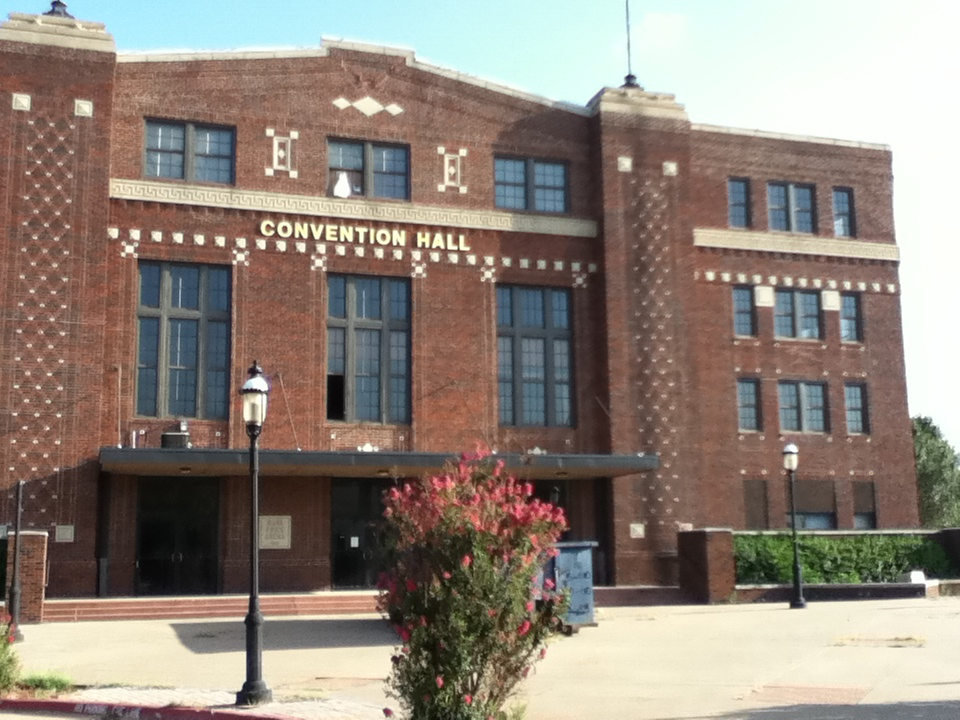
Enid's Convention Hall houses the Mark Price Arena. The Oklahoma Storm played their games at Mark Price Arena and the Chisholm Trail Expo Center.

Phillips University baseball teams, coached by Enid native Joe Record, went to the NAIA World Series three times during his tenure as head coach (1952–1981). Record was the NAIA Coach of the Year in 1973, and was inducted into the NAIA Hall of Fame in 1975.

The Northern Oklahoma College Enid Jets baseball team were conference champions in 2002, 2003, 2005 and 2018. They were Region II champions in 2002, 2004, 2018, and runners up in 2009. They were Southwest District Champions in 2002 and also received third place in the NJCAA World Series in that 2002 and 2018.

=== Basketball ===
Enid is currently home to the Enid Outlaws of The Basketball League (TBL), who play at Stride Bank Center.

The Oklahoma Storm USBL franchise called Enid home. Through their eight years in Enid (2000–2007 seasons), they won their division more than once, and won the USBL Championship in 2002.

=== Football ===
The Enid High School Plainsmen have won six state football championships, in 1919, 1942, 1964, 1965, 1966, and 1983. They went to the Oklahoma State Championship football game in 2006 and lost to the Jenks Trojans.

The Phillips University football teams, coached by John Maulbetsch, beat the University of Oklahoma and University of Texas football teams and lost only one game in the 1918 and 1919 seasons. When Phillips defeated Texas 10–0 in Austin, Texas, in October 1919, the Longhorns had not lost a game since 1917.

The Enid Enforcers is a semiprofessional/minor-league team which began play in the spring of 2008 in the Central Football League. Made up of players from Enid and the surrounding areas, the team has achieved national ranking status three times, amassing a CFL League Championship in 2012, two Northern Division Championships, and 47 league All-Star players, while helping numerous young men gain college athletic scholarships and boasting a 40-13 record in just five years. The Enforcers moved to the Premier Amateur Football Association in 2018 due to a league merger.

The Oklahoma Flying Aces played indoor football in Enid as members of Champions Indoor Football in 2019 and the National Arena League in 2024.

== Education ==
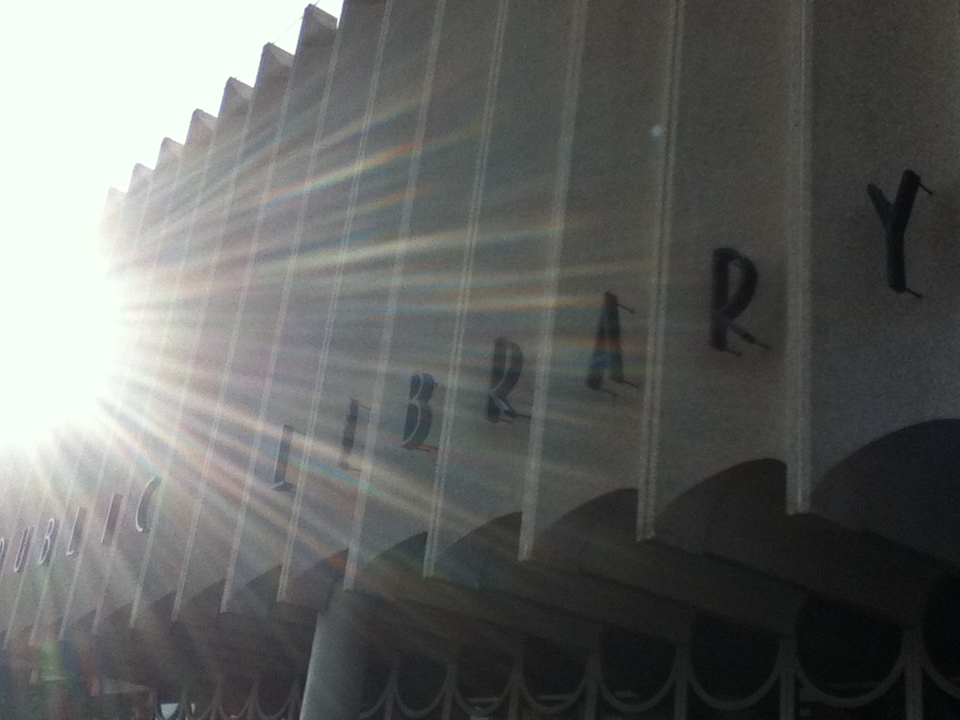
The Public Library of Enid and Garfield County

In the 2020 Census, 87% of residents had a high school diploma and 23.3% had a bachelor's degree or higher. Enid has several institutions of education and is served by seven school districts. They include:

- Enid Public Schools
- Chisholm Public Schools
- Kremlin-Hillsdale Schools
- Pioneer-Pleasant Vale Schools
- Waukomis Public Schools
- Drummond Public Schools
- Garber Public Schools

Pioneer-Pleasant Vale's elementary is often referred to as Pleasant Vale Elementary. The Cimarron Montessori School and Summerhill Children's House are the city's two Montessori style schools.

Several private Christian schools representing a variety of denominations are also located in Enid: Bethel Bible Academy, Emmanuel Christian School, Enid Adventist School, Hillsdale Christian School, Saint Joseph Catholic School, and Saint Paul's Lutheran School. Enid High School, Chisholm High School, and Oklahoma Bible Academy are the city's largest secondary education schools.

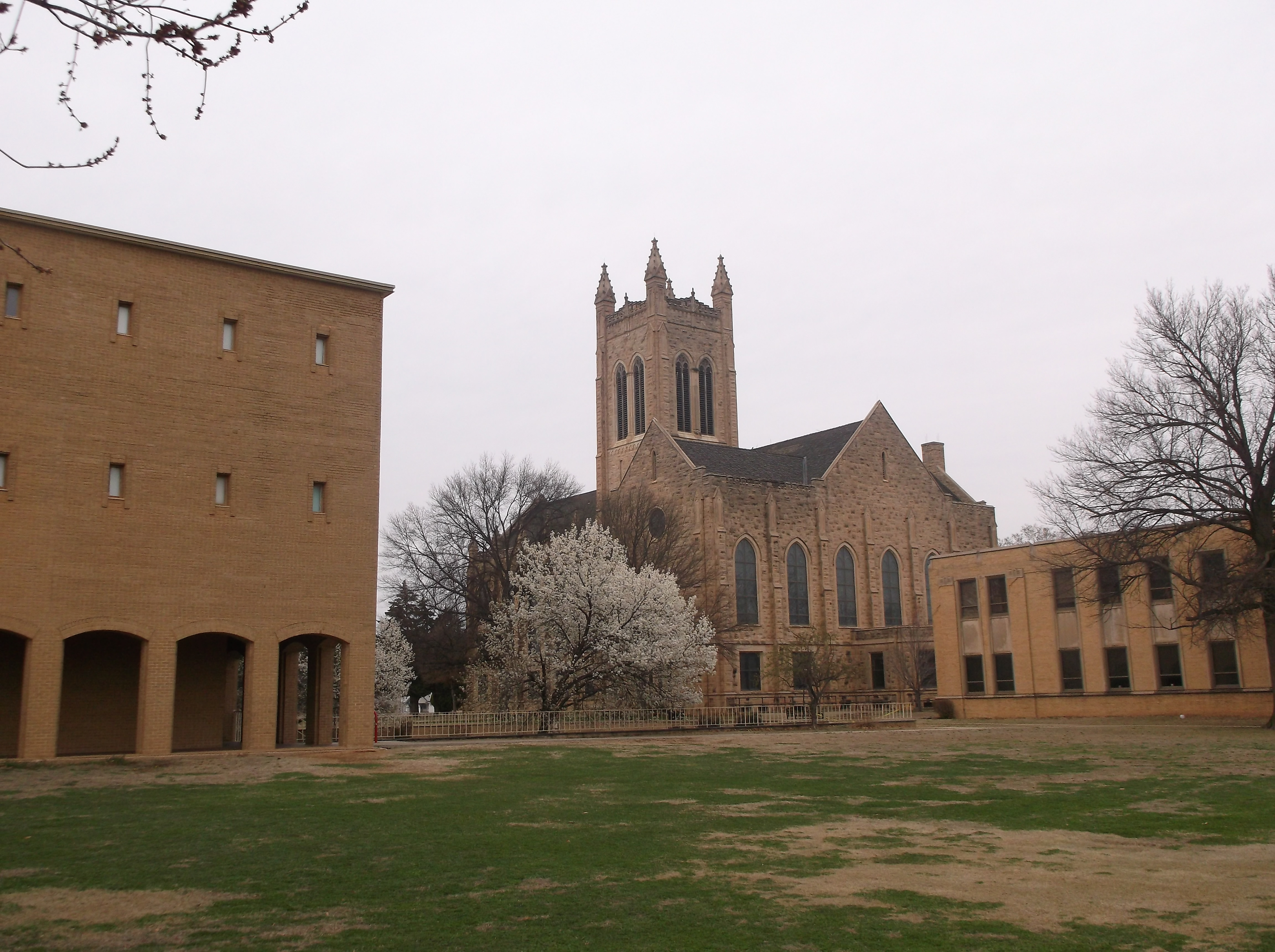
Northern Oklahoma College Enid Campus

Autry Technology Center, one of the CareerTech centers in Oklahoma run by the Oklahoma Department of Career and Technology Education, serves as the city's only vocational education institution. Northern Oklahoma College serves as Enid's community college, and Northwestern Oklahoma State University (NWOSU) provides bachelor and graduate-level education. Enid was formerly home to Phillips University, which closed in 1998. Its campus is now owned by Northern Oklahoma College. Philips University drew Marshallese to Enid in the 1970s.

The Public Library of Enid and Garfield County, established in 1899, also serves as an educational resource for the community. Enid was once home to a Carnegie library, which opened in 1910. After years of funding shortages, the building was condemned in 1957. The library's current modernist building was opened in 1964.

== Media ==
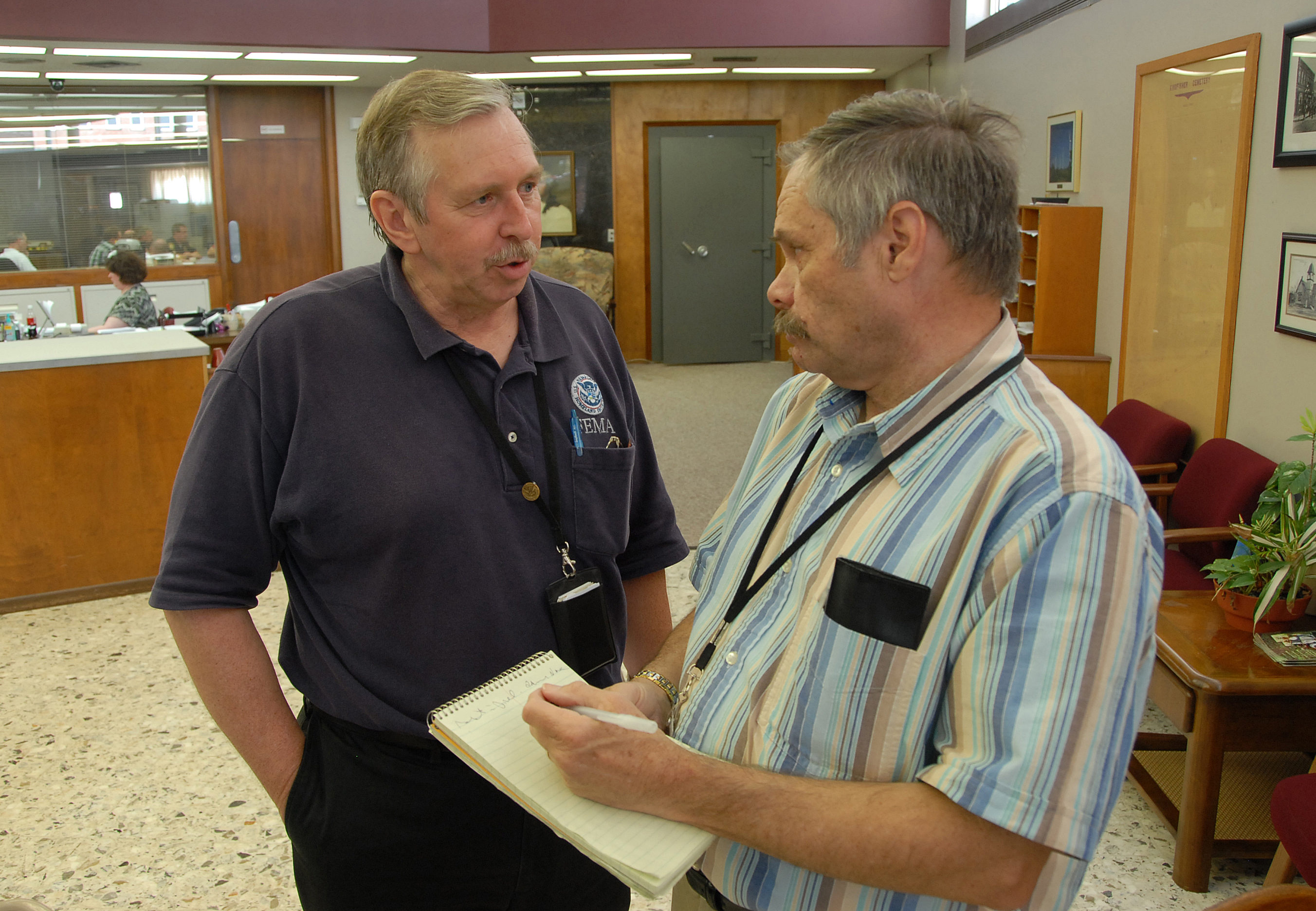
News and Eagle reporter Robert Barron interviews FEMA's Charles Henderson following the 2007 Kingfisher flood.

The Enid News & Eagle is the city's daily newspaper. Historically, the city had 28 newspapers. The Enid Eagle began publication in September 1893. The Enid Daily Wave, later the Enid Morning News, began in December 1893. In February 1923, the papers were combined to form the Enid Publishing Company.

Enid once had two local broadcast television stations. Public-access television station, PEGASYS, was founded in 1986. PEGASYS broadcast on cable channels 11 and 12, and 19. PEGASYS was managed by a non-profit, and aired largely volunteer produced community programming. In 2014, the city of Enid renamed it the Enid Television Network (ETN) and upgraded its broadcast equipment. In December 2019, ETN ceased its cable television broadcasts and transitioned to online streaming.

KXOK-LD briefly locally produced programming from Oakwood Mall in the early 2000s. It is now a Retro TV affiliate.

Enid was home to television station KGEO, an ABC affiliate from July 1954, to 1958, when it moved its transmitter to Oklahoma City, Oklahoma. The station is now KOCO-TV.

KQOB 96.9 FM broadcasts in a classic hits format. Stations KNID 107.1 FM and KOFM 103.1 FM specialize in country music. KKRD 91.1 FM and K226BR 93.1 FM are devoted to religious content. KCRC 1390 AM broadcast sports games. KGWA 960 AM and KZLS 1640 AM is a talk radio station, and KXLS 95.7 FM plays various musical genres.

EnidBuzz.com was one of the first digital media sources in Enid, beginning in 2005. After 20 years online it continues to provide daily news and information. Other digital media websites included ILoveEnid.com and Route60Sentinel.com.

== Infrastructure ==
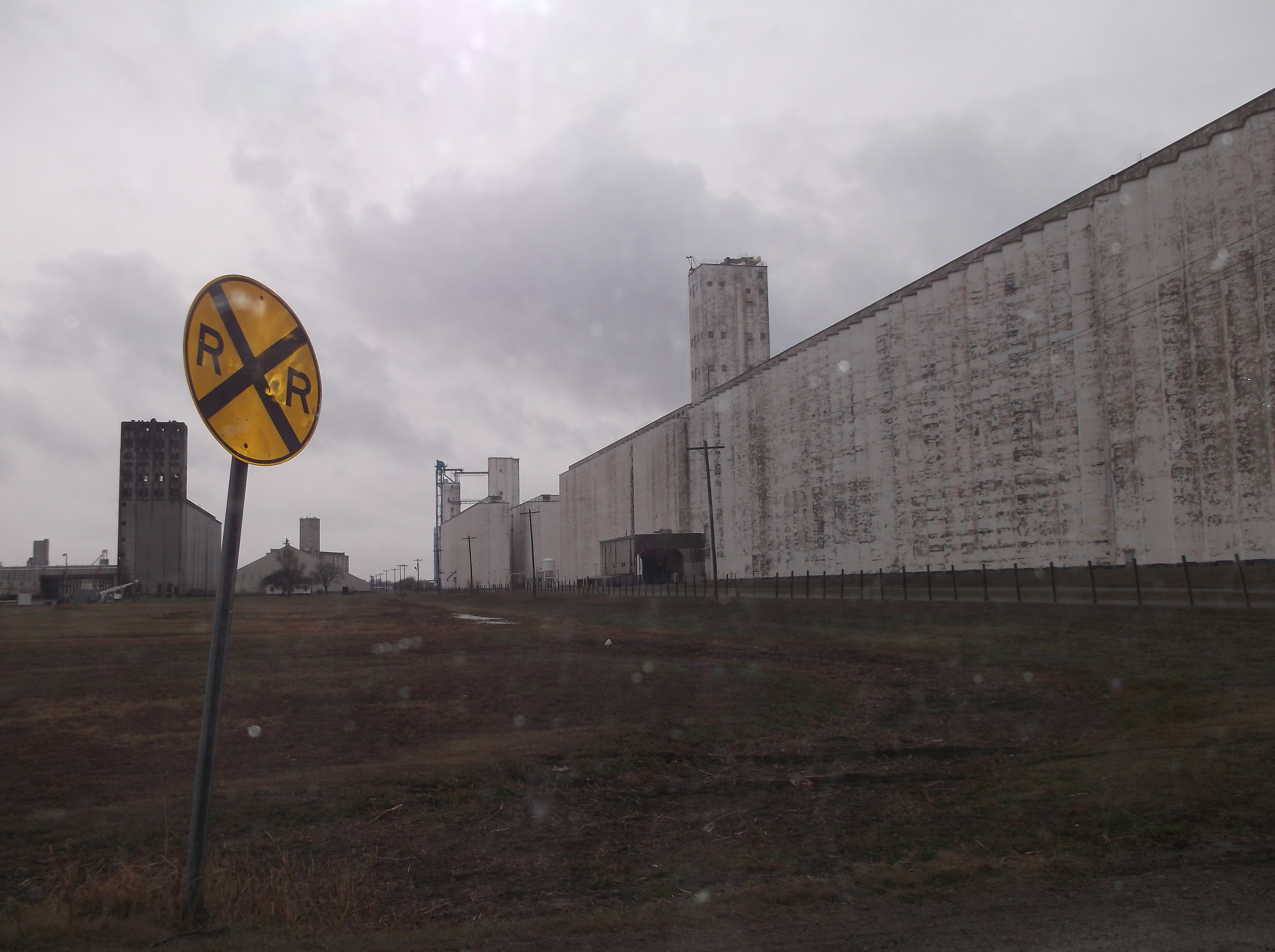
A grain elevator by the railroad in Enid

=== Healthcare ===
Enid has a number of medical clinics and two hospitals. INTEGRIS Health Enid Hospital has 207 beds throughout its three facilities. INTEGRIS Health Enid Hospital is the oldest hospital in Enid, founded in 1910, and incorporated in 1914 as Enid General Hospital and Training School for Nurses. St. Mary's Regional Medical Center, a 245-bed facility with 127 licensed professionals, was established in 1915 as Enid Springs Sanatorium.

Both Enid hospitals are affiliated with the Oklahoma Hospital Association, and their CEOs are FACHE certified. Clinics include the Garfield County Health Department and Veterans Affairs Clinic. Vance Air Force Base Clinic is operated by the 71st Medical Group, which consists of the 71st Medical Operations and Support Squadrons.

=== Transportation ===
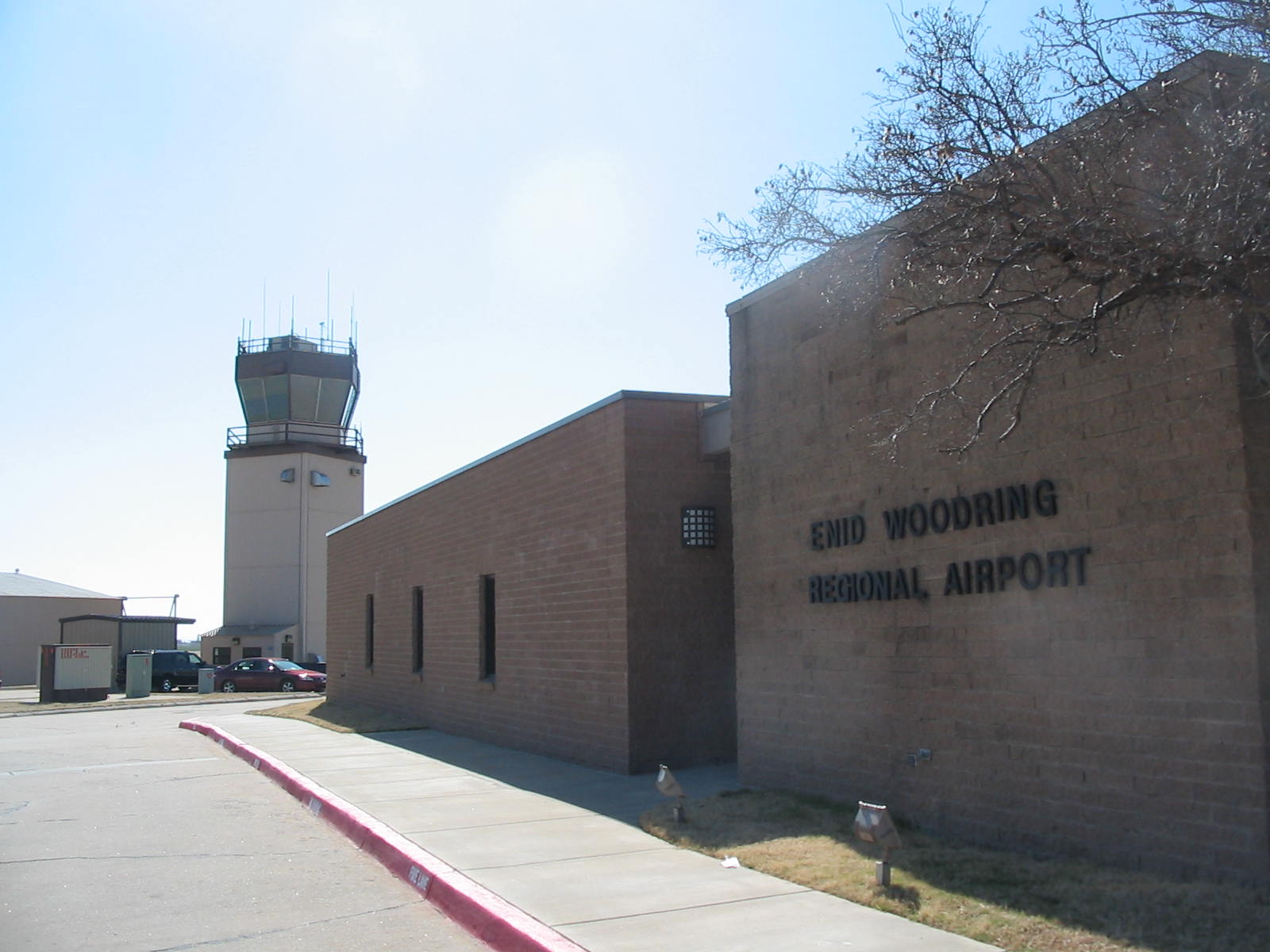
Enid's Woodring airport, named after barnstormer I.A. Woodring, was the first municipally owned airport in Oklahoma.

The main highways serving the City of Enid are U.S. Highway 81 Van Buren and U.S. Highway 412 Owen K. Garriott. U.S. Highway 64 runs west down Garriott and U.S. Highway 60 runs east. Both of these highways join together with highway 81 in North Enid, Oklahoma. State Highway 45 also runs through North Enid on Carrier Road.

Railroad development in Garfield County began four years prior to the land opening, and Enid became a central hub within the county, with rail systems running in ten directions. Historical railroads included Enid and Tonkawa Railway, Enid and Anadarko Railway, Blackwell, Enid and Southwestern Railway, Enid Central Railway and the Denver, Enid and Gulf Railroad. Enid's railroad history is displayed at the Railroad Museum of Oklahoma which is housed in the former Santa Fe railroad Depot. The Rock Island Depot is listed on the National Register of Historic Places.

Active railroad operations in Enid are Farmrail (FMRC) / Grainbelt Corporation (GNBC), BNSF Railway, and Union Pacific Railroad (UP). In the past, Atchison, Topeka & Santa (ATSF); Burlington Northern (BN); Chicago, Rock Island & Pacific (CRIP); Missouri-Kansas-Texas (MKT); North Central Oklahoma; and Saint Louis San Francisco "Frisco" (SLSF) connected Enid to the rest of Oklahoma by rail. BNSF has given site certification to the Easterly Industrial Park three miles east of the City, meaning the railroad has identified the location as an optimal rail-served site meeting ten economic development criteria, intended to minimize development risks customers may face.

From 1907 to 1929, Enid had its own streetcar system, operated by Enid City Railway. The street cars were later replaced by buses, following a declaration by the Enid government that made streetcars illegal.

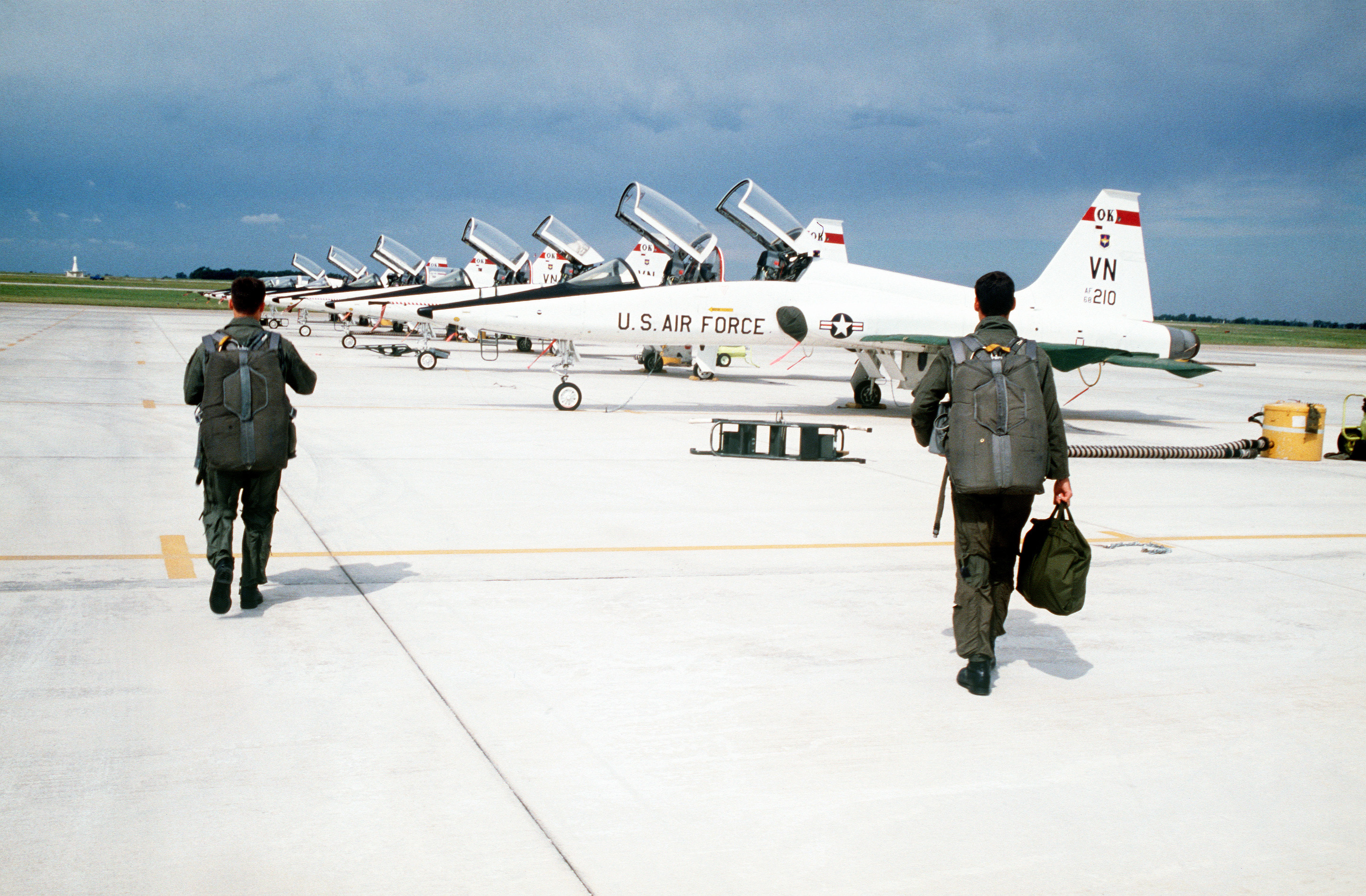
Military pilots have been training in Enid since 1941 with the founding of Vance Air Force Base.

Since 1984, the Transit, operated by Enid Public Transportation, has been in operation, providing on-demand shuttle services. The Transit also offers service to Oklahoma City's Will Rogers Airport, Greyhound Bus Service, and Amtrak Train Station.

==== Airports ====
- Enid Woodring Regional Airport (KWDG) (1167 feet above mean sea level) is located four miles (6 km) southeast of Enid at 36 degrees 22.75 north latitude and 97 degrees 47.47 west longitude. This Class D facility has a 6,249-foot (1,905 m) primary runway and a 3149 secondary runway. There is no scheduled air service.
- Will Rogers World Airport offers commercial air transportation, about 89 miles to the south.
- Vance Air Force Base (KEND) (1,307 feet above mean sea level) is located four miles (6 km) south of the city at 36 degrees 20.21 north latitude and 97 degrees 54.59 west longitude. It was founded in 1941 on land leased by the city of Enid to the United States Army Air Forces, now the United States Air Force. Vance also uses the KWDG facility for military training flights. Since its establishment the base, named after Lt. Col Leon Robert Vance, Jr., has been a major employer in the area.

=== Utilities ===
Enid's electricity is provided by Oklahoma Gas & Electric and natural gas by Oklahoma Natural Gas Company. The City of Enid provides water, wastewater, and trash collection services. Internet, television, and telephone providers include Suddenlink Communications, Pioneer Telephone, and AT&T.

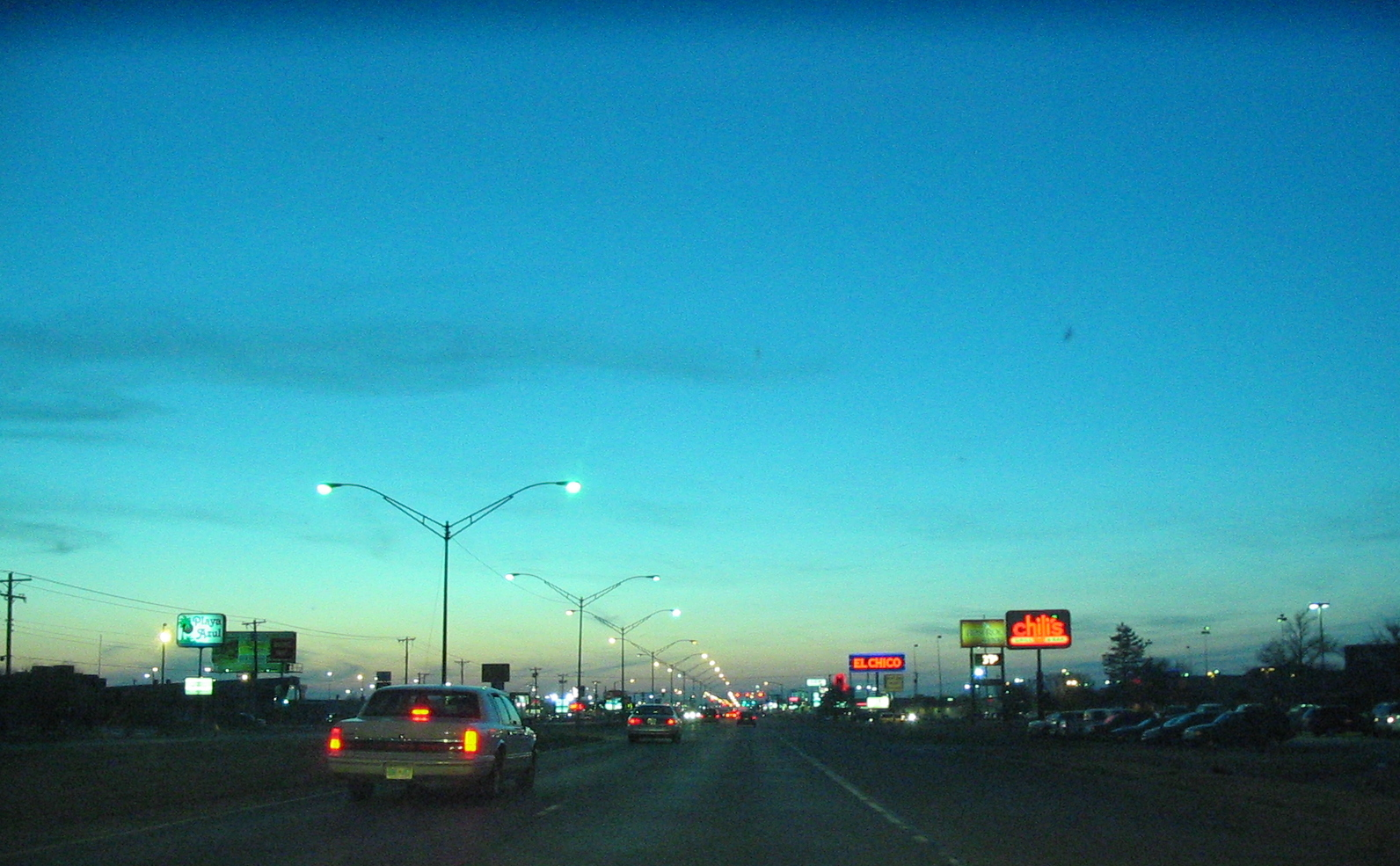
U.S. Route 412 (Owen K. Garriott) in Enid

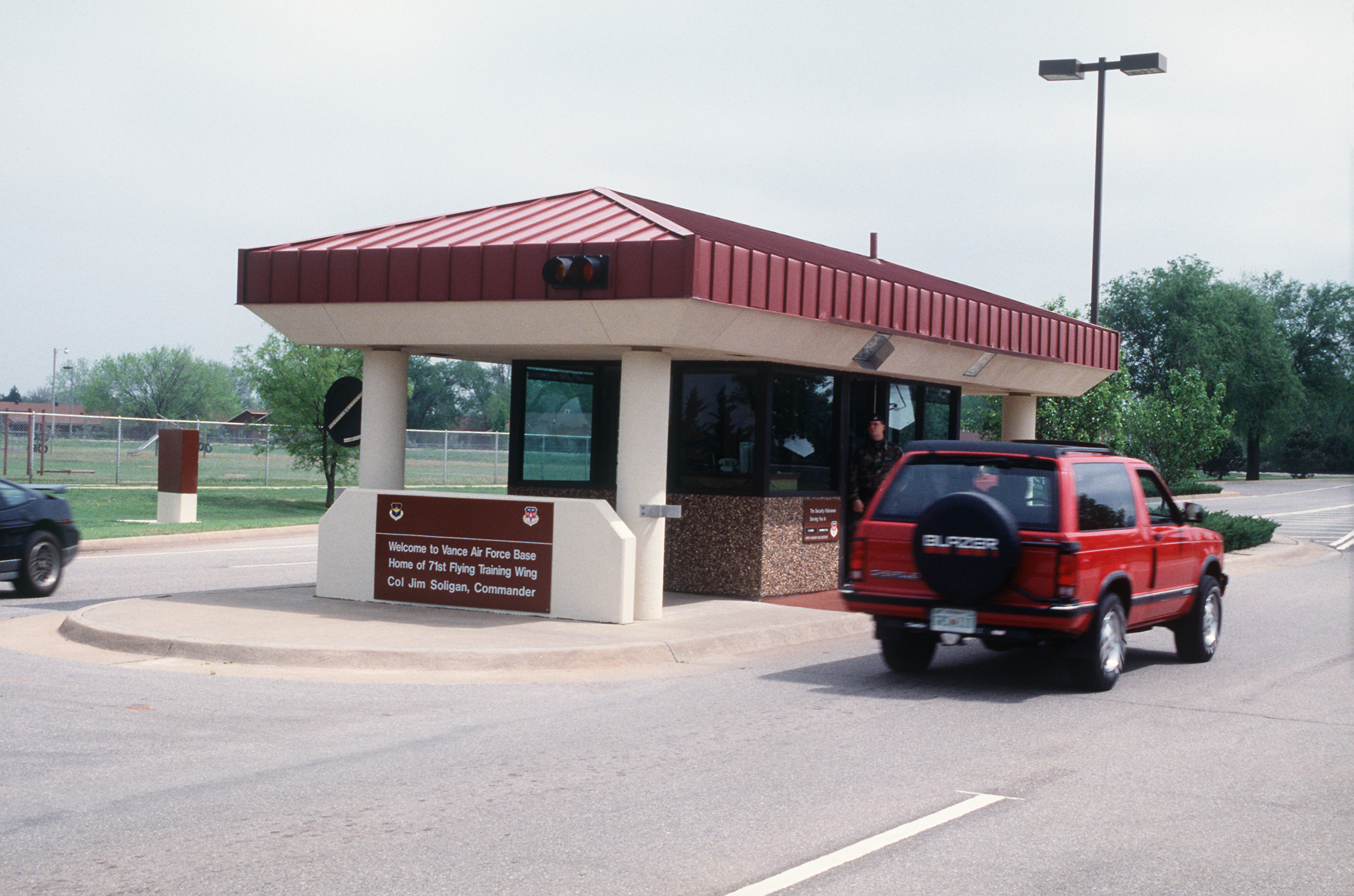
The gate to Vance AFB in Enid

== Notable people ==
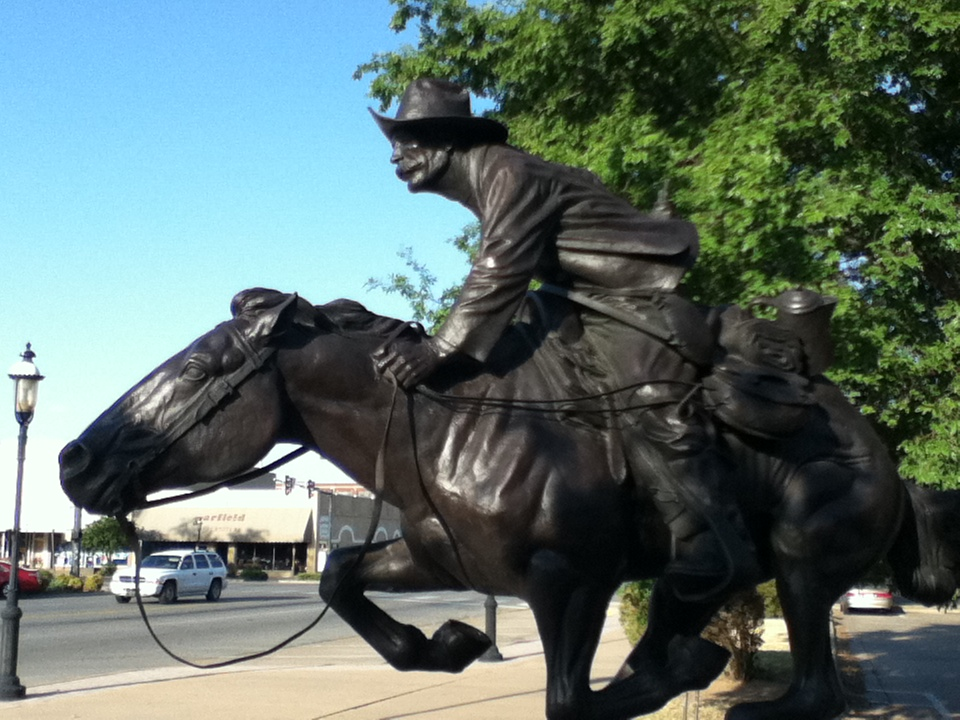
Boomer, a sculpture by Harold T. Holden, sits in downtown Enid by the Cherokee Strip Conference Center.

Enid's Frank Frantz was the seventh and final Oklahoma territorial governor. Enid has been home to several successful entrepreneurs, including oilman Herbert Champlin and casino owner Sam Boyd, founder of the Boyd Gaming Corporation. The arts have also flourished among Enid natives, including Native American painter Paladine Roye and Pulitzer Prize-winning author Marquis James.

Three Oklahoma State Poets Laureate, Betty Lou Shipley, Bess Truitt and Carol Hamilton, grew up in Enid. In 1937, the Enid Morning News referred to Don Blanding as the poet laureate of Enid, Oklahoma, and later he was dubbed the Poet Laureate of Hawaii and Honolulu. The local Don Blanding Poetry Society is named after him. Poets Quraysh Ali Lansana, J. Quinn Brisben, Louis Jenkins, and D.L. Lang also once called Enid home.

Actors Richard Erdman, Glenda Farrell, Lynn Herring, and Thad Luckinbill were all born in Enid, as was Emmy Award-winning director Sharron Miller. Many musicians have called Enid home, including violinist Kyle Dillingham, jazz great Sam Rivers, jazz pianist Pat Moran McCoy, folk singer and banjoist Karen Dalton, fingerstyle guitarist Michael Hedges and opera singer Leona Mitchell, with the last two having streets in Enid bearing their names. Mark Kelly, bass player of the Christian rock band Petra, calls Enid home.

Yahweh Ben Yahweh) was the founder of the religious group Nation of Yahweh.

Attorney Stephen Jones defended Timothy McVeigh after the Oklahoma City bombing.

A number of military heroes have also come from Enid, including former US Army Special Forces operator Bo Gritz, Medal of Honor recipient Harold Kiner, and Pearl Harbor hero USAF General Kenneth M. Taylor. Enid has a history of aviation professionals, from aviation pioneer Clyde Cessna, founder of the Cessna Aircraft Company, to Irving Woodring, one of the Army's "three Musketeers of aviation". Cessna's pioneering flights earned him the nickname the "Birdman of Enid". One of Enid's main streets is named after astronaut Owen K. Garriott. Enid's Air Force base is named for Medal of Honor recipient Leon Vance.

Some claim that two people involved in the Abraham Lincoln assassination lived and died in Enid. In 1901, Osborn H. Oldroyd wrote The Assassination of Abraham Lincoln Flight, Pursuit (sic), Capture, and Punishment of the Conspirators, which claimed that Sgt. Boston Corbett, the man who killed John Wilkes Booth in Virginia, resided in Enid, employed as a medicine salesman. Local legend holds that Corbett is buried in one of the unmarked graves in the Enid Cemetery.

In 1907, Finis L. Bates wrote The Escape and Suicide of John Wilkes Booth. The book claimed that David E. George, a tenant at the Grand Avenue Hotel who committed suicide by poison in 1903, was actually John Wilkes Booth. After sitting for years in Penniman's Funeral Home, George's mummified body later toured the carnival circuit. The 1937 short film The Man in the Barn by Jacques Tourneur revisits the story of George as Booth.

== In popular culture ==
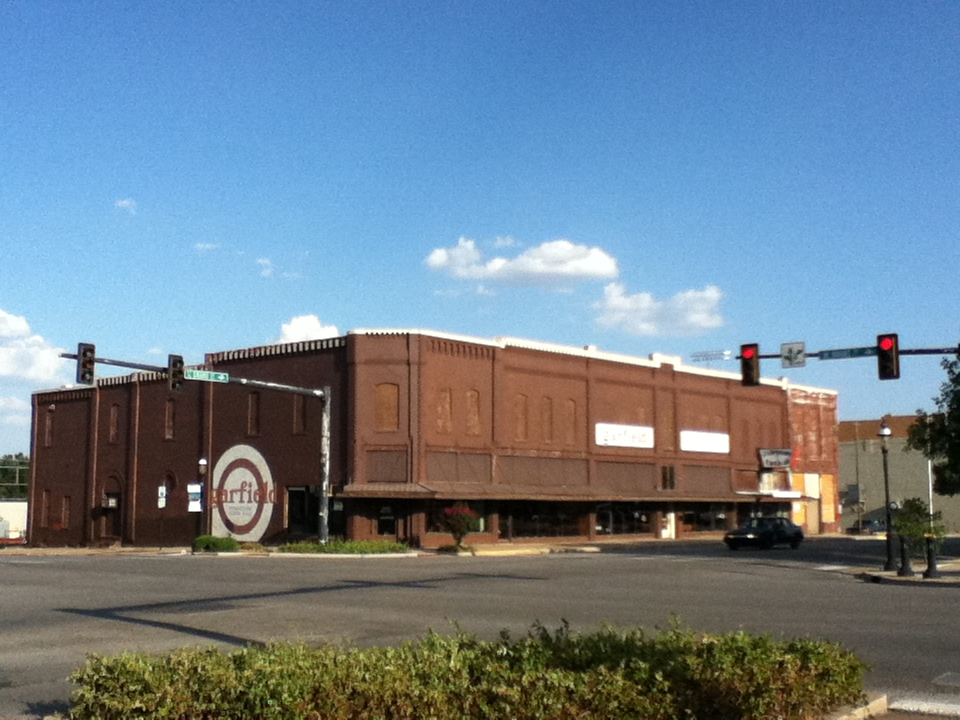
Garfield Furniture is housed in what used to be the Grand Hotel, where David E. George, who claimed to be John Wilkes Booth, committed suicide in 1903.

In 2019, the Oklahoma State Chamber of Commerce ranked Enid as "The best Oklahoma city in which to live." Enid was ranked the 28th best place in the US to raise a family in a 1998 Reader's Digest poll. and in the March 2004 issue of Inc. listed as one of the top 25 small cities in the US for doing business. Good Morning America listed Enid as one of its top five up and coming areas in a January 2006 episode.

Hollywood has come to Enid, shooting scenes from Dillinger in front of the Mark Price Arena and the Grand Saloon, the 1955 short film Holiday for Bands features Enid's Tri-State Music Festival, and portions of the film The Killer Inside Me were filmed in Enid's downtown square. The 2018 film Wildlife was also partially filmed in Enid.

According to television, Enid has been the site of hauntings and exorcisms. Ghost Lab featured Enid as part of an investigation of sites claimed to be haunted by John Wilkes Booth, and A Current Affair ran a segment on expensive religious exorcisms.

Enid is mentioned in passing in a few popular novels and films. In chapter 12 of The Grapes of Wrath, it is one of the towns that feeds into Route 66 from the north via Route 64.

In the CBS series The Big Bang Theory, character Sheldon Cooper contemplates moving to Enid because of its "low crime rate" and "high speed internet" service, but decides against it because the city lacks a model railroad store.' In fact, Enid does have a railroad museum at 702 N Washington St, Enid, the Railroad Museum of Oklahoma, complete with a gift shop featuring trains and box cars.

In the FX series The Americans, FBI agent Stan Beeman plans to relocate a family of Soviet defectors to Enid.

In the 2001 film Jurassic Park III, Paul and Amanda Kirby reside in Enid with their son Eric, who is stranded on Isla Sorna. Referring to a flock of Pteranodons, Amanda says, "I dare them to nest in Enid, Oklahoma."

== Sister city ==
Kollo, Niger was declared as Enid's sister city in August 2010, by Mayor John Criner.
