= Mystery dinner =

Theater dinner styled as a murder mystery

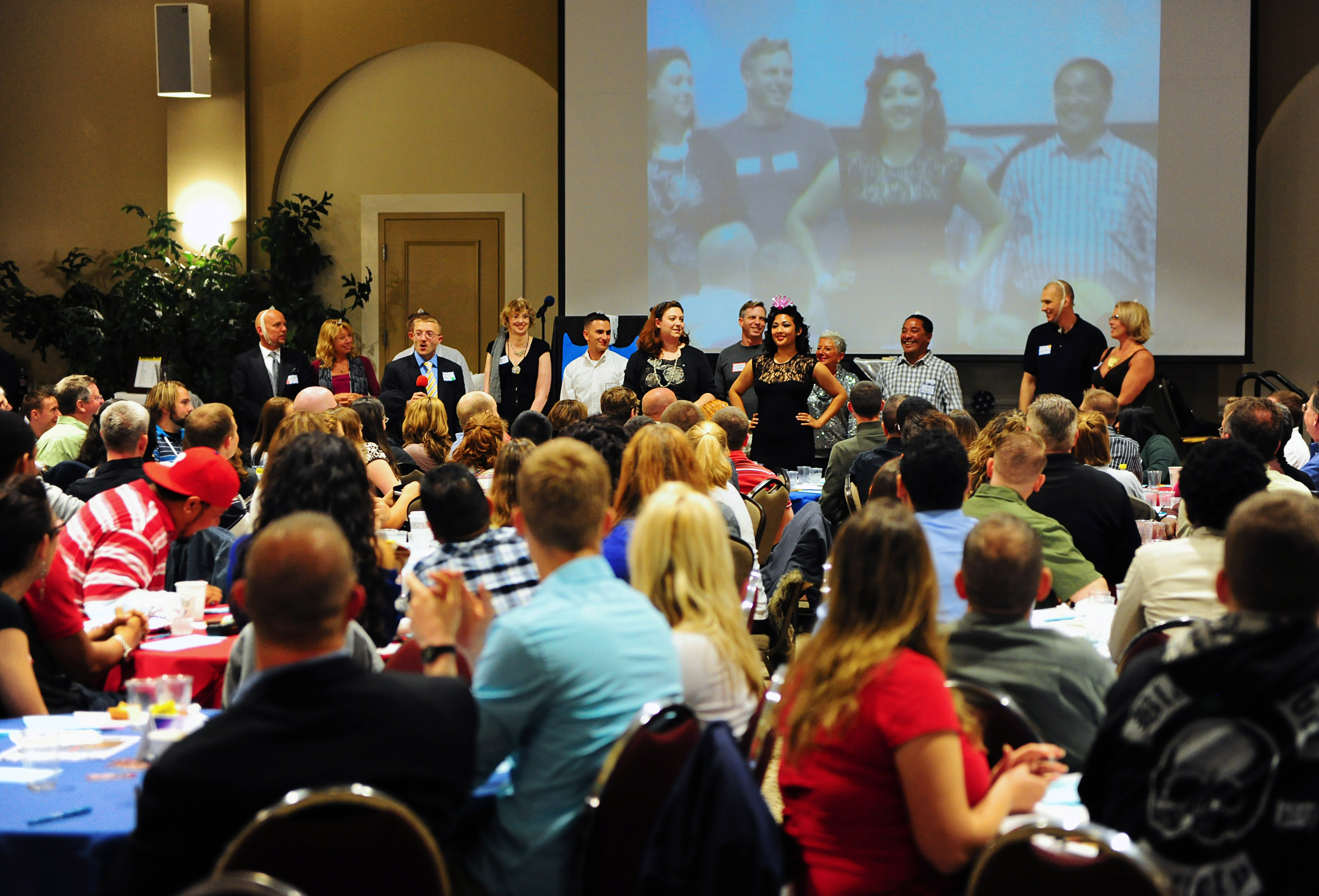
A mystery dinner event

A mystery dinner is a popular type of dinner theater in which the play is a murder mystery, and the diners are invited to solve the mystery as they eat and watch the play. In many mystery dinners, there is no separate stage from the eating area; instead, the actors are mixed in with the diners — and often improvise dialog with diners — creating a more immersive atmosphere.

There are numerous mystery dinner theaters throughout the United States and United Kingdom, these are established venues that provide public shows. Joy Swift is credited with inventing the murder mystery weekend – an interactive dinner theatre which runs uninterrupted from Friday to Sunday – at a hotel in Liverpool on 30 October 1981. She was awarded an MBE in the 2002 New Year Honours for her invention.

There are also kits available for "hosting your own murder mystery dinner" at home, as well as troupes of actors who perform (and cater) private shows, or mystery dinners, in client's homes. Some such kits may not be specifically written for a dinner event, but can be adapted to suit that purpose.

== See also ==
- List of dinner theaters
