= List of dinner theaters =

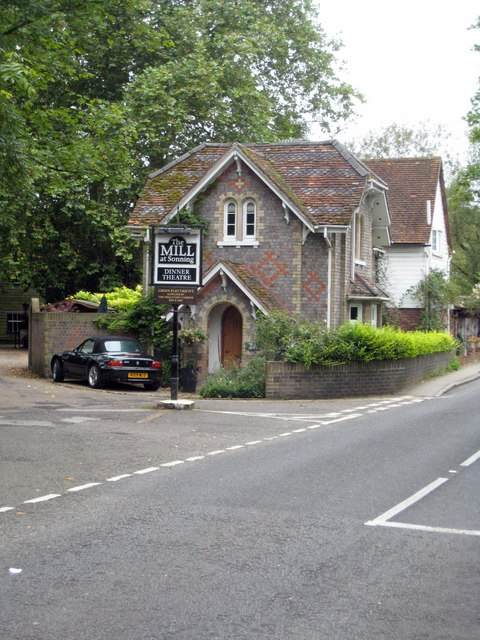
The Mill at Sonning

This is a list of dinner theaters. Dinner theater (sometimes called "dinner and a show") is a form of entertainment that combines a restaurant meal with a staged play or musical. Sometimes the play is incidental entertainment, secondary to the meal, in the style of a sophisticated night club or the play may be a major production with dinner less important and in some cases it is optional. Dinner theater requires the management of three distinct entities: a live theater, a restaurant, and usually a bar.

== Australia ==
- Stagedoor Dinner Theatre – Brisbane, Queensland, Australia

== United Kingdom ==
- Joy Swift's Original Murder Weekends – headquartered in Liverpool with shows in six cities across the United Kingdom
- The Mill at Sonning – converted from an 18th-century flour mill, it is located on an island in the River Thames at Sonning Eye in the English county of Oxfordshire

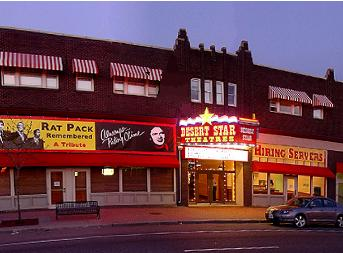
The Desert Star Theater

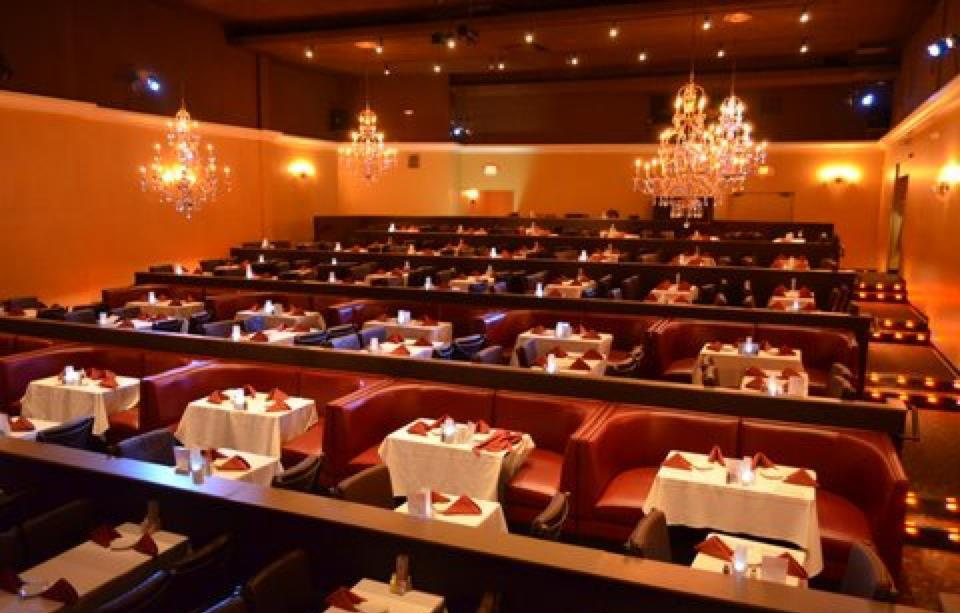
The interior of Encore Dinner Theatre

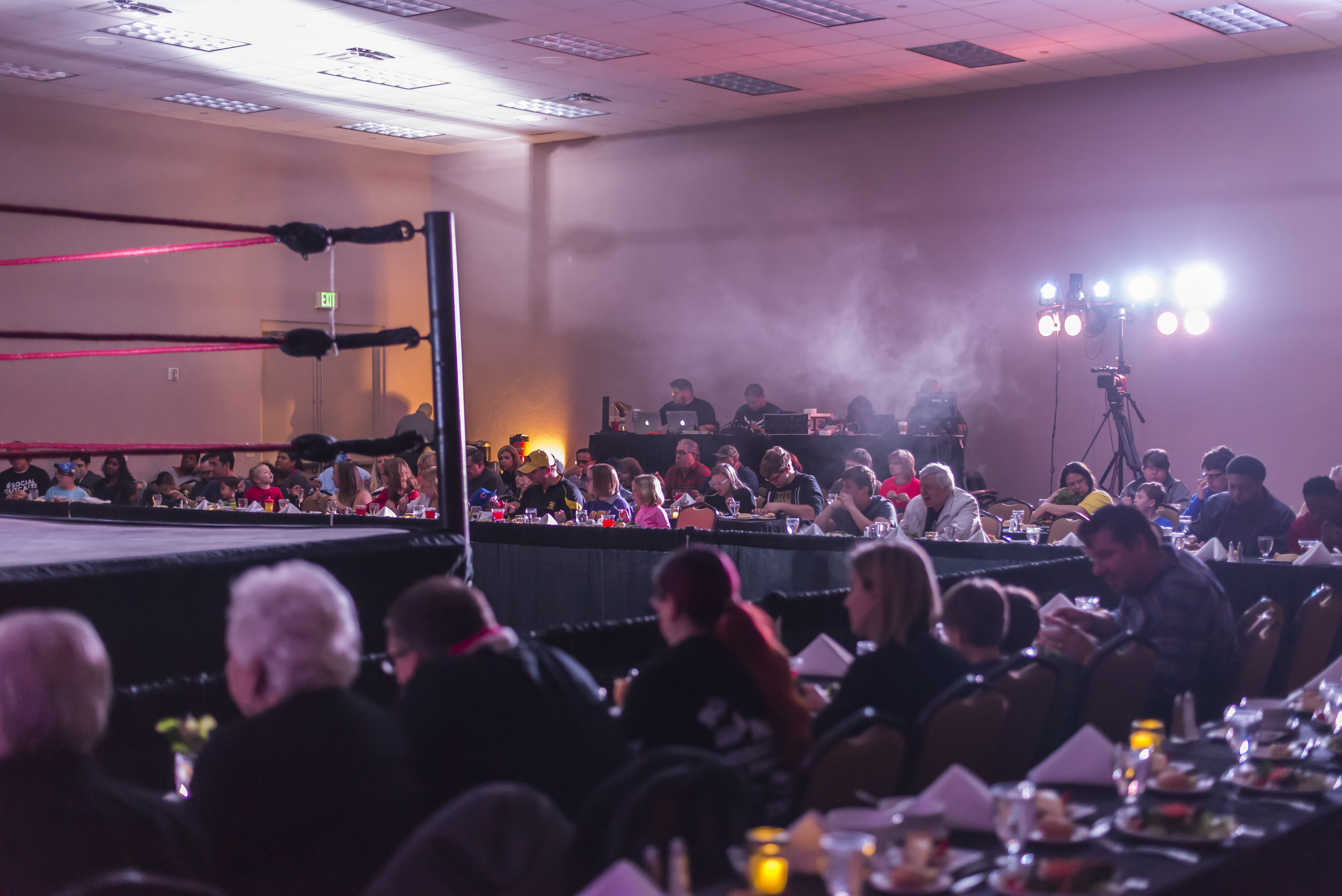
Manor Pro Wrestling Dinner Theater, Kissimmee, Florida

== United States ==
- Alhambra Dinner Theatre – Jacksonville, Florida, 1967
- Beef & Boards Dinner Theatre – Indianapolis, Indiana (since 1973)
- Chanhassen Dinner Theatres – Chanhassen, Minnesota (since 1968)
- Derby Dinner Playhouse – Clarksville, Indiana (since 1974)
- Desert Star Theater – Murray, Utah; listed on the U.S. National Register of Historic Places. It was later closed down and demolished, but rebuilt and expanded into the Iris Theater. The Iris then changed hands several times before being renamed the Vista.
- Encore Dinner Theatre – Tustin, California
- The Fireside Dinner Theatre — Fort Atkinson, Wisconsin (since 1966)
- Gaslight Theatre – Enid, Oklahoma
- The Harmony Theater — Hillsboro, Indiana
- La Comedia Dinner Theatre – Springboro, Ohio
- Laurie Beechman Theatre – in the basement of the West Bank Cafe at 407 West 42nd Street in the Manhattan Plaza apartment complex, just west of Times Square
- Medieval Times – chain of medieval-themed restaurants, featuring a tournament with sword-fighting and jousting
- Teatro ZinZanni – a circus dinner theater that began in the neighborhood of Lower Queen Anne in Seattle, Washington; expanded to a site on the waterfront at Pier 29 on The Embarcadero in San Francisco, California
- The Keeton Theatre – Nashville, Tennessee 2004
- Toby's Dinner Theatre – Columbia, Maryland
- Way Off Broadway Dinner Theatre – Frederick, Maryland

=== Herschend ===
A number of dinner theaters are owned by Herschend Entertainment including:

- Dolly Parton's Stampede – a chain of dinner theaters located in Pigeon Forge and Branson is owned by entertainer Dolly Parton and managed by World Choice Investments LLC, a joint venture between The Dollywood Company, Fred Hardwick, and Herschend Family Entertainment Corporation.
- Pirates Voyage Dinner and Show – a dinner theater in three locations that features Blackbeard, a pirate with a history along the North and South Carolina coasts
- Showboat Branson Belle – a dinner theater on Table Rock Lake in Branson, Missouri

=== Defunct ===
- Battle of the Dance – Anaheim, California (2011–2012)
- Drury Lane Theatre – a suburban Chicago theatre group, the original of which operated as a dinner theatre (1958–2003)
- Fulton Theatre – located at W. 46th St. in New York City; operated as a dinner for a few months in 1911 under the name Folies-Bergere; demolished
- Riverside Inn – Cambridge Springs, Crawford County, Pennsylvania; destroyed by fire in 2017
Active dinner theaters

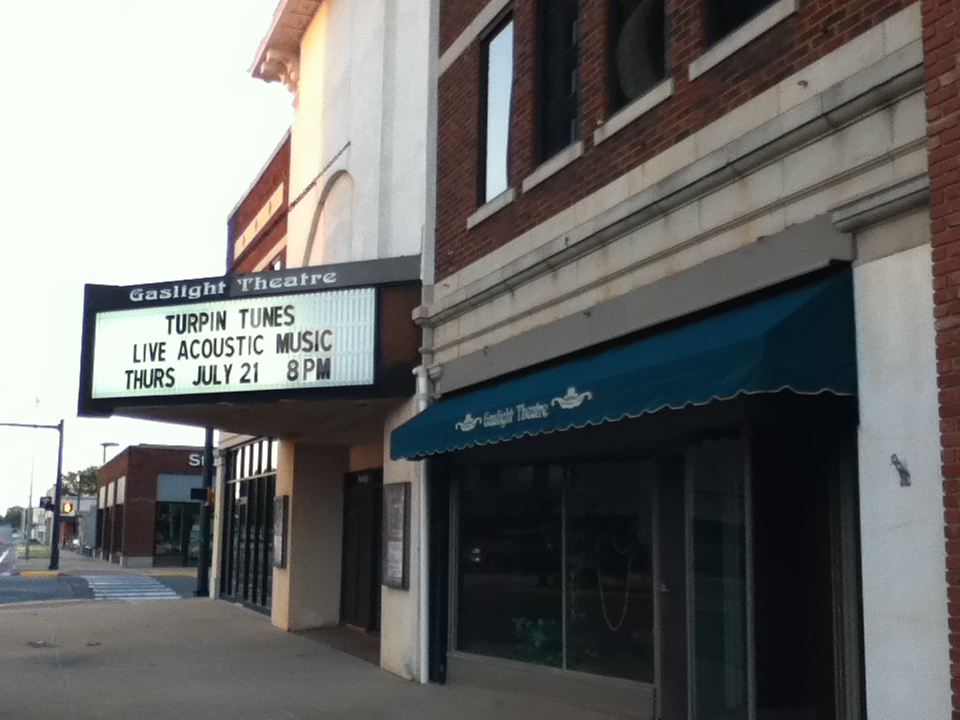
Gaslight Theatre

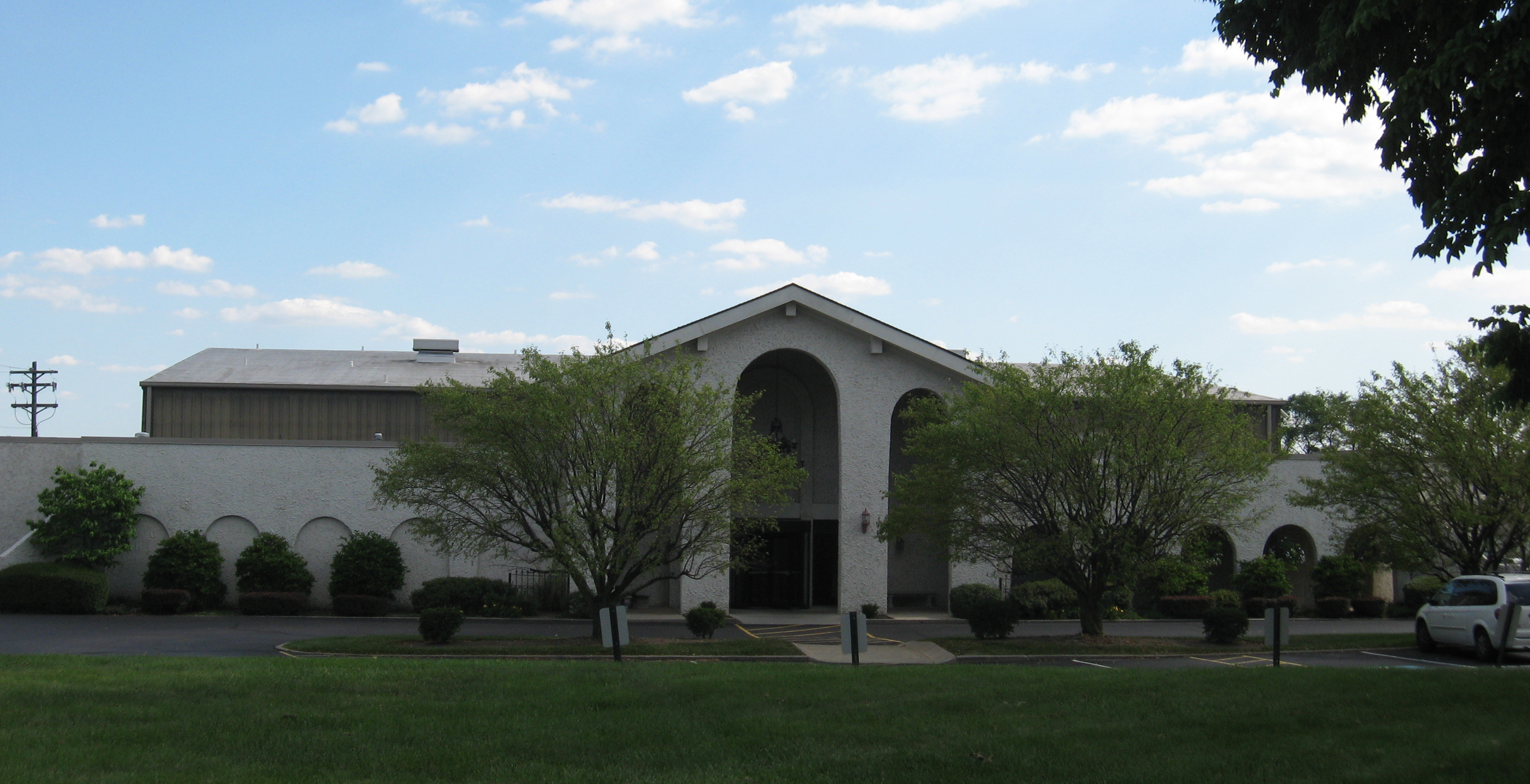
La Comedia Dinner Theatre

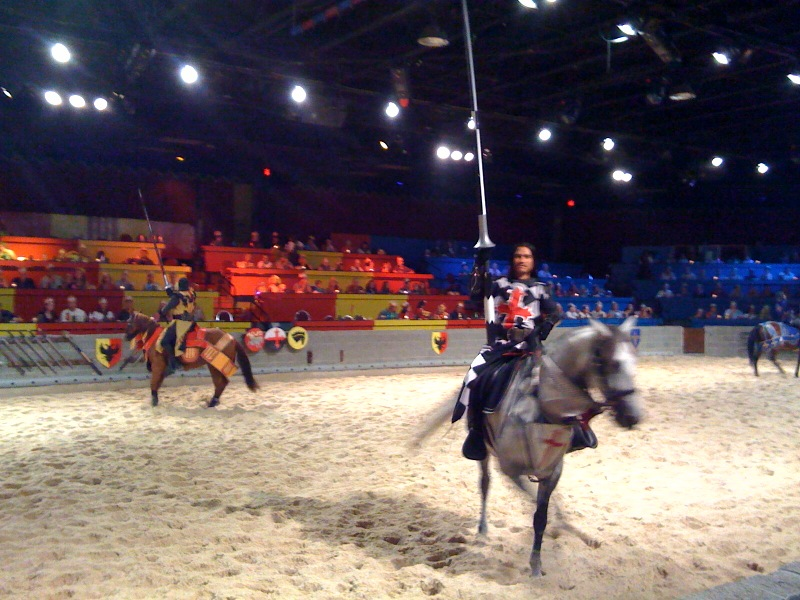
The introduction of the knights at Medieval Times dinner theater

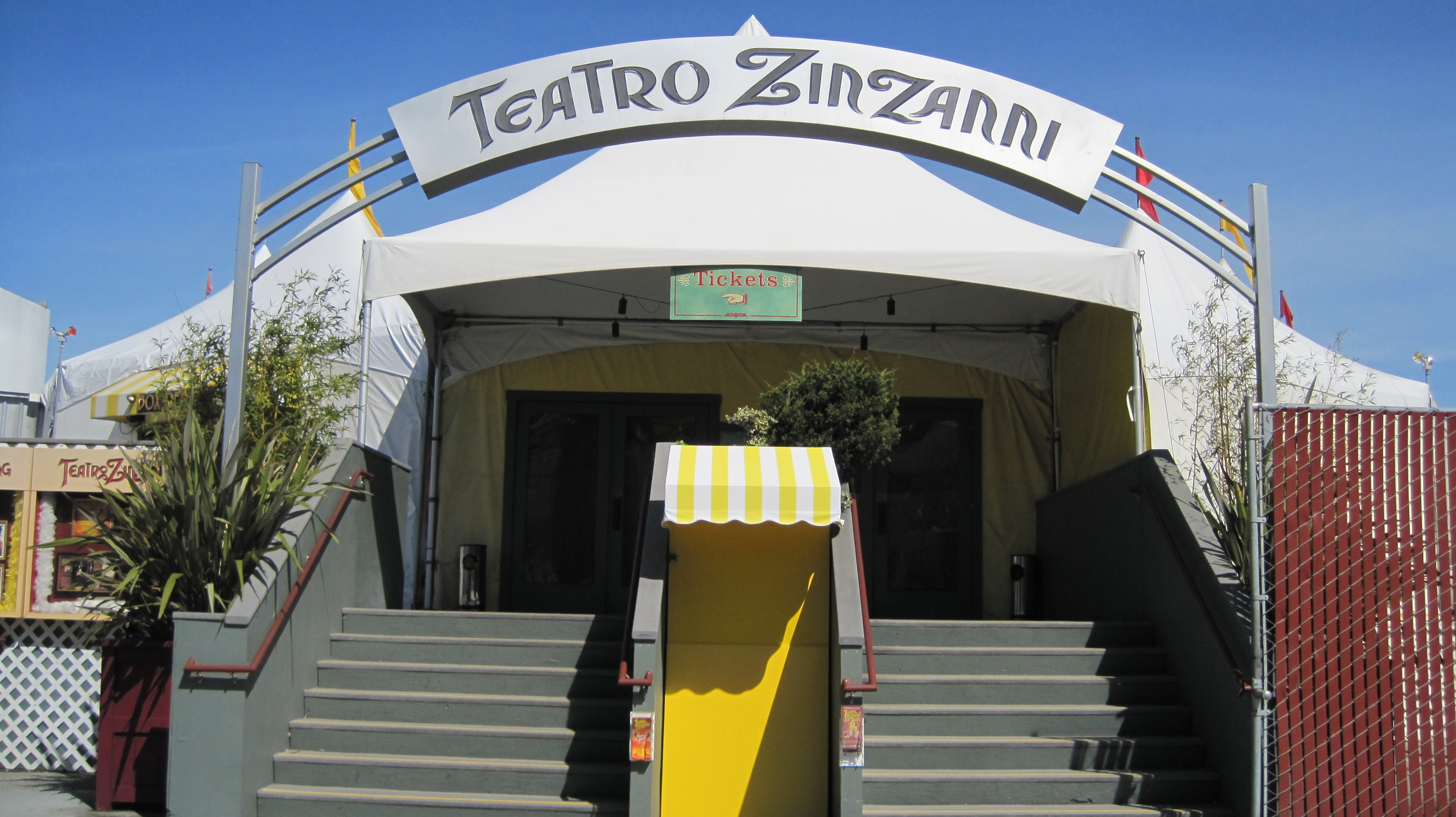
Teatro ZinZanni in San Francisco

== See also ==
- Lists of restaurants
- Lists of theatres
- Madrigal dinner
- Mystery dinner
- Luau
