= Encore Dinner Theatre =

Dinner theatre in Tustin, California

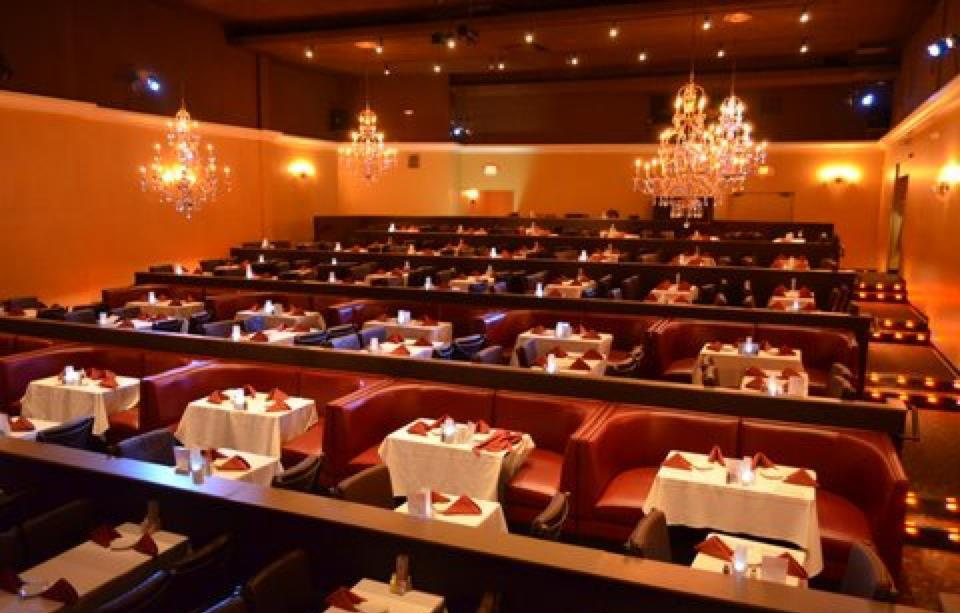
- Encore Dinner Theatre auditorium
- Interactive map of Encore Dinner Theatre
- Address: 690 El Camino Real; Tustin, California; United States
- Coordinates: 33.73849°N 117.8245°W
- Owner: Mani Properties, Inc.
- Capacity: 200-300

Website
- www.encoredinnertheatre.com

Encore Dinner Theatre is a dinner theater in Tustin, California with live performances such as plays, comedy acts and musical shows. The auditorium holds an audience of between 200 and 300 people, depending on the performance. Through the years, the venue has operated under different names and the current name came into use after the 2011 renovation.

== History ==
Originally opened as a venue for movies called Tustin Theater in 1962, the location changed owners twice before becoming a dinner theater in the 1980s. At that time, Elizabeth Howard assumed ownership and continuously operated Elizabeth Howard's Curtain Call Dinner Theater until her 2005 retirement. Main Place Christian Fellowship took over Curtain Call Dinner Theater until 2009 when Melissa Cook and Jeff Chamberlin became the owners. In 2011 Curtain Call Dinner Theater closed and remained vacant during the renovation. The first show at the new Encore Dinner Theatre took place late 2011. In 2014, the venue was featured on an episode of Food Network's Mystery Diners, hosted by Charles Stiles.

== Renovation ==
With an ownership change came a $1.5 million renovation in 2011. The lobby was remodeled while the auditorium interior was gutted and rebuilt with new chandeliers, stage lighting and dining furniture.

== See also ==
- List of dinner theaters
