= Alhambra Dinner Theatre =

Dinner Theatre Alhambra

Coordinates: 30.287004°N 81.500938°W

Alhambra Theatre & Dining
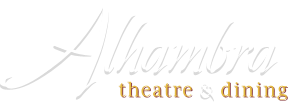
- Company type: Private
- Industry: Entertainment/Restaurant
- Founded: Jacksonville, Florida (1967)
- Founder: Ted Johnson
- Headquarters: Jacksonville, FL, United States
- Number of locations: Jacksonville, FL
- Key people: Tod Booth Sr., Director/Producer; DeJuan Roy, Food Service Director; Craig Smith, Theatre Partners Managing Member
- Owner: Theatre Partners
- Number of employees: 125
- Website: http://www.alhambrajax.com/

The Alhambra Theatre & Dining in Jacksonville, Florida, is the oldest continuously-running professional dinner theater in the United States, and the only professional resident theatre in Northeast Florida. USA Today's readers voted the venue the best dinner theatre in the US in April 2025.

== History ==
The Alhambra was built by Jacksonville businessman Leon Simon in 1967 and purchased by Tod Booth, Sr. in 1984. Booth moved to Jacksonville from Chicago, where he worked as artistic director for the Drury Lane Theaters. His family has frequently been involved, with daughter Jessica Booth and wife Lisa Valdini appearing in a number of shows and son Tod Jr. contributing in various aspects, including acting, directing and stage managing of the dinner theatre before becoming general manager and director of the Alhambra's Children's Theatre.

As with other dinner theaters of the 1970s, Alhambra initially relied on the appeal of former stars of film, television and music to attract customers. Alhambra's first such headliner was in Barefoot in the Park in 1969, which featured former Gilligan's Island costar Dawn Wells. Stars earned weekly pay between $1,500 and $5,000 for six to eight weeks as well as being able to enjoy the weather and amenities in Florida. According to Booth, "When their careers cooled, a star could learn a show and take it on the dinner theater circuit. That one show could be a meal ticket for a year or two." Other celebrities, including soap opera cast members, hosts from TV game shows, and Playboy Centerfold gals appeared in productions. In the early 1980s, however, it became difficult to hire former big names to act in dinner theatre. Booth explained: "They could make more in a day doing a commercial than they could make during the entire run of dinner theater show, and they didn't have to travel. Plus, a lot of the stars just started dying off." As a result, few of the performers had familiar names, but all were professionals, most with extensive experience on stage, in movies and TV. The show itself was promoted, rather than the headliner.

== Notable appearances ==
Since the 1970s, over 100 stars have graced the Alhambra stage:

Celebrity	Production	Year
Alan Sues	Send Me No Flowers	1972
Ann B. Davis	Lullaby; 3 on a Honeymoon	1972
Artie Johnson	The Seven Year Itch	1973
Barbara Britton	Forty Carats	1972
Barbara Eden	Social Security	2014
Barry Williams	The Odd Couple	2011
Bernie Kopell	The Sunshine Boys	2005
Betty Grable	Born Yesterday	1973
Bill Daily	Tribute	1981
Bob Crane	Beginner's Luck	1973
Bob Denver	Paisley Convertible	1973
Broderick Crawford	The Second Time Around	1976
Cesar Romero	Never Get Smart with an Angel	1978
Cindy Williams	Weekend Comedy	2013
Claude Akins	I Ought to Be in Pictures	1984
Cyd Charisse	Kindling	1978
Cyd Charisse	Bell, Book and Candle	1981
Dana Andrews	Best of Friends	1974
Dawn Wells	Barefoot in the Park	1969
Dennis Cole	And All the Girls Came Out to Play	1970
Dennis James	The Impossible Years	1979
Don Ameche	Girl in the Freudian Slip	1971
Dorothy Lamour	Fallen Angels	1973
Dorothy Lamour	Personal Appearance	1976
Dwayne Hickman	Natalie Needs a Nightie	1974
Eddie Bracken	Hotline to Heaven	1976
Elaine Joyce	6 Rms Riv Vu	1982
Esther Rolle	Nearlyweds	1976
Fabian Forte	Love is a Time of Day	1971
Fannie Flagg	Once More, with Feeling!	1972
Forrest Tucker	Plaza Suite	1977
Forrest Tucker	Captain Outrageous	1981
Frank Gorshin	Breaking Legs	1995
Frank Sutton	The Last of the Red Hot Lovers	1972
Gail Bliss	A Closer Walk with Patsy Cline	2000,01,02,04
Gale Gordon	Never Too late	1977
Gale Gordon	Love & Kisses	1979
Gary Burghoff	Boney Kern	1982
Gene Barry	Hot Shot	1977
Gene Rayburn	Lovers Leap	1980
George Hamilton	6 Rms Riv Vu	1974
Georgia Simmons	Tobacco Road	1970
Gig Young	Harvey	1974
Gordon Jump	Norman, Is That You?	1983
Hugh O'Brian	Cactus Flower	1974
Imogene Coca	A Girl Can Get Lucky	1970
Imogene Coca	Plaza Suite	1971
Jack Cassidy	Murder Among Friends	1976
Jack Kelley	Under the Yum Yum Tree	1975
James Drury	Catch Me If You Can	1972
James Drury	The Prisoner of Second Avenue	1976
James Drury	California Suite	1979
Jay Thomas	Chapter Two	1980
Jamie Farr	Lend Me a Tenor	2011
Joan Caulfield	Butterflies are Free	1972
Jay Thomas	See How They Run	1982
Jay Thomas	A Gentleman and a Scoundrel	1982
Joey Bishop	The Seven Year Itch	1981
John Carradine	Tobacco Road	1970
Jonathan Harris	The Pleasure of His Company	1972
Joyce DeWitt	Remember Me	2012
Judy Carne	Mary, Mary	1977
June Wilkinson	Pajama Tops	1970,75,76
June Wilkinson	The Ninety Day Mistress	1978
Keith Carradine	Tobacco Road	1970
King Donovan	A Girl Can Get Lucky	1970
King Donovan	Plaza Suite	1971
Lance E. Nichols	Driving Miss Daisy	2013
Lara Parker	The Ninety Day Mistress	2013
Lauren Tewes	Born Yesterday	1981
Leanza Cornett	Barefoot in the Park	1997
Lee Meredith	Champaign Complex	1968
Lee Meredith	The Marriage-Go-Round	1980
Liv Lindeland	Will Success Spoil Rock Hunter?	1972
Lyle Waggoner	Boeing-Boeing	1970
Loretta Swit	Murder Among Friends	2013
Mamie Van Doren	In One Bed, Out The Other	1971
Mamie Van Doren	A Dash of Spirits	1977
Marjorie Lord	How the Other Half Lives	1974
Martha Raye	Everybody Loves Opal	1979,83
Martin Milner	The Tender Trap	1980
Meredith MacRae	Sunday in New York	1971
Michael Learned	Driving Miss Daisy	2013
Mickey Rooney	See How they Run	1973
Milt Kamen	Take My Wife	1971
Morey Amsterdam	Who Wants Fat Hair	1978
Morgan Fairchild	Paisley Convertible; The Seven Year Itch	1973
Nancy Kulp	Busybody	1976
Paige O'Hara	The Sound of Music	1979; 1982
Pam Blair	Cactus Flower	1974
Pamela Mason	The Marriage-Go-Round	1975
Pernell Roberts	Any Wednesday	1974
Pat O'Brien	Paris is Out	1974
Patty Weaver	Any Wednesday	1978
Pia Zadora	The Drunkard	1971
Randolph Mantooth	Arsenic and Old Lace	1983
Ray Walston	You Know I Can't Hear You When the Water's Running	1976
Richard Egan	Hanky Panky	1978
Richard Egan	Broken Up	1979
Richard Karn	I Ought to Be in Pictures	2014
Robert Morse	Play It Again, Sam	1978
Robert Morse	Murder at the Howard Johnson's	1980
Robert Morse	Wally's Cafe	1984
Robert Q. Lewis	Norman, Is That You?	1971
Robert Reed	Wake Up, Darling	1974
Ruta Lee	Goodbye Charlie	1972
Sal Mineo	How The Other Half Lives	1974
Sally Struthers	Hello Dolly	2012
Sandra Dee	The Ninety Day Mistress	1975
Sandy Dennis	Same Time, Next Year	1979
Selma Diamond	Funny Girl	1977
Sid Caesar	The Last of the Red Hot Lovers	1982
Stephen Douglas	I Do! I Do!	1970
Sue Ane Langdon	The Owl and the Pussycat	1975
Tab Hunter	The Tender Trap	1973
Tab Hunter	Here Lies Jeremy Troy	1975
Vera Miles	Forty Carats	1972
Vera Miles	Painting Churches	1986
Veronica Hamel	Cactus Flower	1974
Vivian Vance	Arsenic and Old Lace	1974
Dawn Wells	Come Blow Your Horn	2017

The theatre features three-course served dinners and a full bar service. The bar hosts patrons who arrive early for happy hour. The facility uses a Thrust stage to give all 408 seats an excellent view. Several staff members have been at the venue for over 25 years.

== Brief closure ==
On August 31, 2009, the Alhambra Dinner Theatre suspended operations, citing the effect of the Late-2000s recession on attendance and expenses. The sale of the theatre to Theatre Partners, a group of local investors, was announced on October 28, 2009.

The group stated that operations would resume December 1, 2009, with A Christmas Carol, which has been a fixture in Jacksonville for more than 20 years. Former owner Tod Booth agreed to direct the shows, which were the primary attraction. The food was placed under the direction of DeJuan Roy, a popular local restaurateur, who has changed the menu with each show; table service replaced the buffet style of serving. The building's decor has been spruced up with new flooring, fixtures, paint and table place settings.

The new ownership group hosted a free outdoor dinner show on November 7, 2009, to celebrate the revival of the local theatre landmark. Chef Medure cooked on a grill and performers entertained with classic show tunes. It was announced that the first show for the 2010 Season would be High School Musical beginning December 30, 2009.

== Actors' Equity Association Do Not Work Order ==
The Alhambra Dinner Theatre is currently on the Actors' Equity Association's Do Not Work list meaning that Equity members are not permitted to work on any production produced or performed at the Alhambra Dinner Theatre under penalty of suspension or permanent expulsion not only from AEA but from the unions affiliated with the Associated Actors and Artistes of America known as the 4As unions which includes SAG-AFTRA, American Guild of Musical Artists, American Guild of Variety Artists and the Guild of Italian American Actors.

== See also ==
- List of dinner theaters
- Cabaret
