= Battle of the Dance =

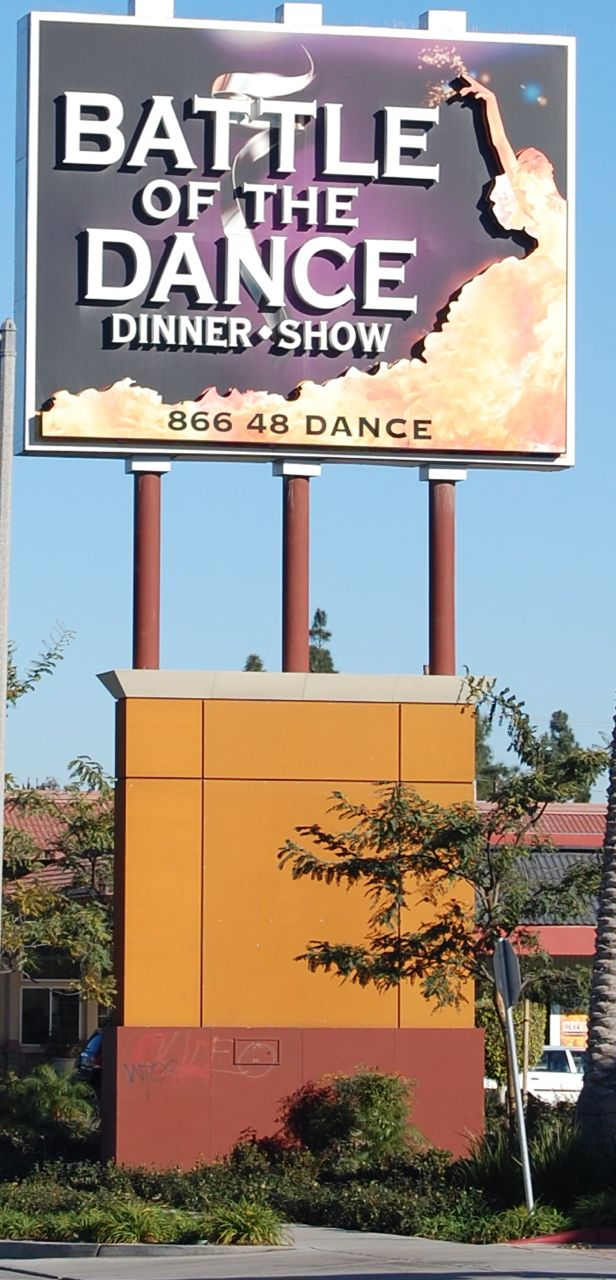
- Type: Private
- Founded: Anaheim, California, United States (February 2, 2011)
- Founder: Andrés Gelabert
- Defunct: June 18, 2012
- Fate: Closed
- Headquarters: 33°47′30″N 117°54′50″W, Anaheim, California, United States
- Number of locations: 1
- Area served: Southern California
- Number of employees: 200

Battle of the Dance was a dinner theater in Anaheim, California, featuring contrasting styles of dance—principally flamenco and Irish folk dancing—performed by a cast of over 40 dancers. Designed to cash in on the popularity of such shows as Dancing with the Stars and So You Think You Can Dance, the venture was very ambitious: the brainchild of Medieval Times founder Andrés Gelabert, backed by $10 million in investor capital, and performing in a dedicated 40,000 square foot venue. Performances debuted to much fanfare in February 2011, and the show met with critical success: for example, the Orange County Register said, "Without a doubt... some of the best flamenco and Spanish dancers you'll ever see," and called the choreography "masterful". However, the show never became a popular success, and it closed indefinitely just 16 months after its opening, in June 2012.

== History ==
=== Background ===
Battle of the Dance began as a concept by entertainment magnate Andrés Gelabert, who had previously had success with the dinner theater format, both in the U.S.-based Medieval Times chain, and with a flamenco-heavy dance review called "Son Amar" in his hometown of Majorca, Spain. With the success of dance-based TV shows in the U.S., Gelabert felt the time was right to try replicating that success with a live dance show. Identifying Anaheim as the home for his new venture, Gelabert said, "I'm here to show people first-class dancing and Southern California is one of the best places to do this." In 2010, construction began on the site of a long-abandoned Toys R Us store within walking distance of Disneyland. Most of the dancers were hired locally, with husband-and-wife choreographers Francisco Javier Valverde Hidalgo and Paloma Aznar Mendez reporting themselves both surprised and pleased with the depth of dancing talent to be found in Orange County.

=== Performance run ===
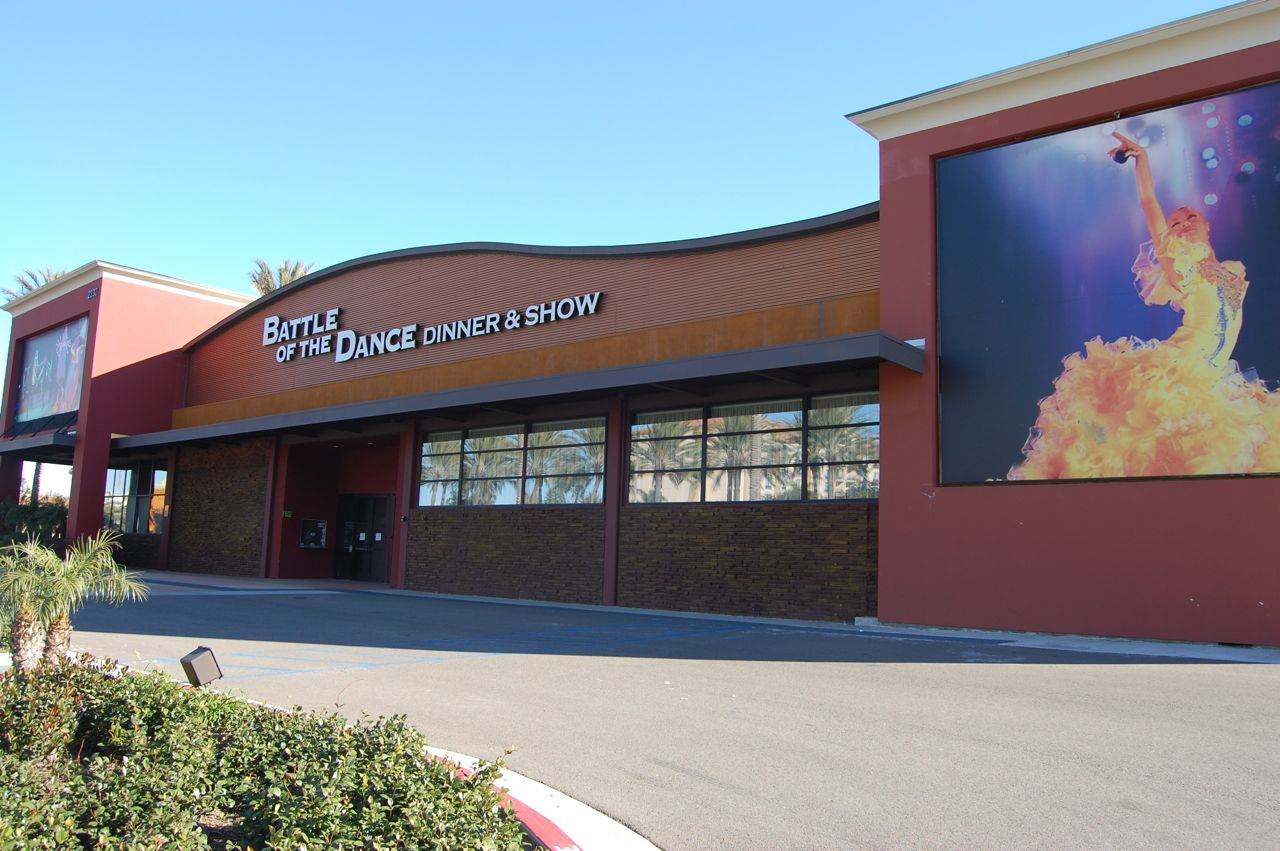
Battle of the Dance Theater

The opening of Battle of the Dance was much anticipated: for example, the 2011 edition of "Where Guestbook: Orange County" listed it among Anaheim's highlights, alongside such long-established attractions as Disneyland Resort, the Anaheim GardenWalk, and Angel Stadium. Opening day was February 1, 2011, with adult tickets priced from $60 to $90. Arriving patrons were greeted in the lobby by the dancers, who posed for photographs. In addition to the 950-seat theater/restaurant, the facility featured a gift shop with merchandise ranging from t-shirts to full flamenco dresses. The performance itself ran 1 hour, 45 minutes.

The show, set in the year 1588, opened with a recreation of a Spanish Armada ship wrecked on the Irish coast. The two cultures thus thrown together began attempting to out-do each other with their native dances, providing an opportunity to feature the two principle dance styles of the show: flamenco and Irish folk dancing. In addition to these, the performance also included musicians, magicians, comedians, acrobats and other artists.

=== Closure ===
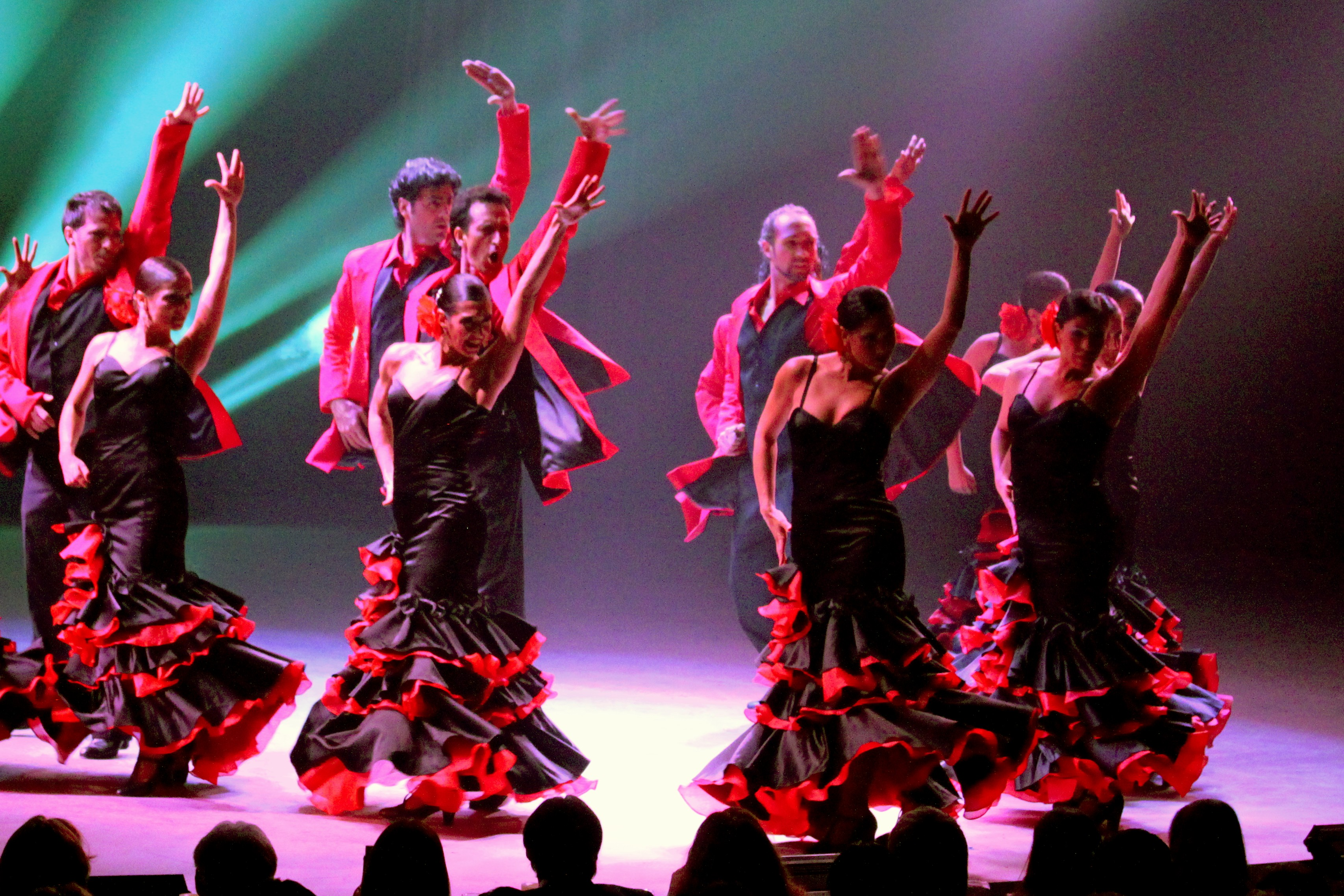
Performance at the show in 2011

The show never attracted large crowds. Part of the problem may have been the disappointing quality of the food, which even in the early going had been reviewed as "so-so" and was later described as "terrible" and "tragic". One reviewer described his entree as a "criminally dry macadamia-nut-crusted mahi mahi," and also faulted the theater decor, calling it "as chintzy as a community-college lecture hall" and saying, "One wonders where that $10 million went."

Management struggled to keep the show afloat, arranging for an out-of-town opening at the Flamingo Casino in Las Vegas during the end of 2011, and meanwhile renting out their spacious Anaheim theater. This only led to further legal and financial difficulties. First, a comedy and magic show called "Blink!" opened in the theater but soon closed abruptly after a contract dispute. Subsequent attempts to rent out the space, such as late night dances, live concerts, and "sexually oriented" acts including a porn star and topless DJ, led to a battery of noise and nuisance complaints, and were ultimately halted by the city of Anaheim as a violation of the theater's use permit. At a permit hearing, a company representative stated they were "ashamed" of acts. More trouble followed as the company was hit with two breach of contract lawsuits by performers cut from the show in an attempted cost savings.

During the last few months of performances, even deep discounts (via coupons and group-sales websites) and special promotions (e.g. a Mother's Day package) could not keep the theater filled, even on weekends. Finally, all remaining performances were cancelled; outstanding ticket holders were notified via paper signs taped up at all the entrances, with an e-mail address to contact for a refund. The closure left behind a raft of unpaid bills; claimants included choreographers, contractors and performers. Anaheim Mayor Tom Tait issued a public statement on the closing, stating, "It's always sad to see a local business close its doors... I look forward to seeing how this property will be turned around and what new business activity it will bring to the Resort area."

=== Later uses ===
In 2014, the theater reopened as the Centro del Mariachi dinner theater, dedicated to mariachi music and headlined by two-time Grammy winners Mariachi Divas de Cindy Shea, who are well-known fixtures at the nearby Disneyland Resort. As of July 2015 the site is a venue for private events such as weddings, receptions, and meetings, called the M3Live Anaheim Event Center.

== See also ==
- List of defunct restaurants of the United States
- List of dinner theaters
