= Mark Lipsky =

Mark Lipsky was the Executive Producer of The Nutty Professor (Jada Pinkett Smith), Metro which The A.V. Club called "too lazily assembled, and too stingy with the jokes, to even live up to its modest ambitions", Beverly Hills Cop III "considered by critics and admittedly by Murphy himself as the most disappointing film in the series", Goosed, Boomerang (Halle Berry, Martin Lawrence), Another 48 Hrs. (Nick Nolte) and Coming to America (James Earl Jones), Vampire in Brooklyn (Angela Bassett) and Harlem Nights (Richard Pryor, Danny Aiello), all starring Eddie Murphy. In addition, Lipsky has produced Tony n' Tina's Wedding and executive produced Precinct Hollywood for AMC.

Lipsky and his wife Judy live in New Jersey. They have three children and eight grandchildren.

== Filmography ==
He was producer for all films unless otherwise noted.

=== Film ===
Year	Film	Credit
1988	Coming to America	Executive producer
1989	Harlem Nights	
1990	Another 48 Hrs.	Executive producer
1992	Boomerang	Executive producer
1994	Beverly Hills Cop III	Executive producer
1995	Vampire in Brooklyn	
1996	The Nutty Professor	Executive producer
1997	Metro	Executive producer
1999	Goosed	
2004	Tony n' Tina's Wedding	
2012	Iniquity	Consulting producer
TBA	Fly Guys	
TBA	Never Give Up	
TBA	The Amazing Mr. Z	Executive producer

Miscellaneous crew

Year	Film	Role
1992	The Distinguished Gentleman	Personal manager: Eddie Murphy

=== Television ===
Year	Title	Credit	Notes
1989	The Arsenio Hall Show	Executive producer	
2016	Rock the House		Television film
2018	Johnny Watson: Functionally Dysfunctional		Television special
