= Ann Lippert =

American comedian and actress

- Notable work: Joni and Gina's Wedding

Ann Lippert is an American comedian and actress. She co-wrote the audience interactive comedy Joni and Gina's Wedding with Marianne Basford.

In her comedy, she parodies her family, her dad's bowling obsession, and relationships. As an actress she has had many parts in television and film. In 2014 she again co-directed Joni and Gina's Wedding at the Viva Las Vegas Events Center in Las Vegas, NV.

== Work ==
List of TV series Ann Lippert has worked on:

- It's a miracle (1998) as Wife
- S Club 7 in L.A (2000) as Waitress
- On Q Live (2005) as Guest
- Close to Home (2006) as Lanie Jenkins

List of videos and films Ann Lippert has worked on:

- Gay propaganda (2002) as Mr. Blond
- Salt the Blade and Twist the Knife: A Lesbian Love Tale (2003) as Director, Writer
- Memoirs of an Evil Stepmother (2004) as Woman in bandages
- Laughing Matters (2004)
- Finishing the Game (2007) as extra
- Love is Love (2007) as Church member
- Fully loaded (2011) as Pick-up girl
- Think like a man too (2014) as Police Officer
- Alongside Night (2014) as FEMA Agent Millicent Tobias
- Viena and the Fantomes (2020) as Brittany
