= Madrigal dinner =

Form of Renaissance dinner theater

A typical choir dressed for a madrigal dinner.

A madrigal dinner or madrigal feast is a form of Renaissance dinner theater often held by schools and church groups during the Christmas season. It is set in the Renaissance Era and is generally comedic in nature. The meal is divided into courses, each of which is heralded with a traditional song. A play is performed between the courses, and a concert of choral music concludes the festivities.

== Music ==
The music performed at a madrigal dinner is usually mixed choral music from the medieval to Renaissance periods. Both popular and sacred songs from the Renaissance are common, although modern music with Renaissance or biblical texts can often be heard. Most selections are in English, Italian, German, or French. Although the dinner takes its name from the madrigal genre of music, many other styles can be heard. Christmas carols are also featured.

Several selections performed at the presentation of the meal's courses are traditional to the madrigal dinner genre. These include The Wassail Song and the Boar's Head Carol. Although they may incorporate small phrases of Latin or French, the presentation songs are primarily sung in English. Each madrigal dinner has a complement of presentation music which is used every year.

== Dramatics ==
The play is performed either after the main course has been served, or in small acts between the courses. The theme is lighthearted and romantic, reminiscent of the King Arthur legends and often revolves around the marriage of a prince or princess. Many characters are canonical, including the King, Queen, and Court Jester who appear in every play. Other characters may be minstrels, thieves, wizards, knights, visiting royalty, Greek gods and goddesses, enchanted princesses, or many other mythical figures. Some recreate the court of Henry VIII. The audience is invited to play a role in the proceedings, either as members of the royal court or as guests at a royal event, such as a wedding or Christmas celebration. Audience participation is often used to enforce this role.

In addition, many madrigal dinners employ roving entertainers, who perform for the guests at their tables alone or in groups. These may be jugglers, poets, beggars, instrumentalists, comedians, or singers. At some shows, the singers will break into small groups and entertain among the audience - a practice known as wenching. The songs performed here are usually modern medievally-styled tunes, Christmas carols and other traditional tunes. Most wenching songs are upbeat and quick and many are bawdy.

== Food ==
Although intended to imitate a meal that might have been served during the Middle Ages, the food at a madrigal dinner is not strictly authentic. Courses usually include a wassail or drinks course, salad, a main course, and dessert. Although the "Boar's Head Carol" is the most popular madrigal song sung to announce the main course, the most popular meat for the main course is chicken, often specifically Cornish game hen.

== Symbolism ==
During the song which accompanies each course, a symbolic object may be carried to the king's throne by two or more ceremonial guards. A boar's head is the universal symbol of the main course. However, since the head is not actually part of the meal and will be used for many years, most madrigal dinners use an imperishable head. Sometimes this is the head of a real boar, pig, or javelina, preserved by taxidermy, and sometimes it is a replica, made from papier-mâché or plaster. The "Boar's Head Carol" equates the presentation of the head with the presence of Christ in the festivities.

== See also ==
- List of dinner theaters
- Medieval Times
