= Way Off Broadway Dinner Theatre =

Dinner theater and children's theater in Frederick, Maryland, US

Coordinates: 39°25′11″N 77°27′5″W

- Interactive map of Way Off Broadway Dinner Theatre
- Address: 5 Willowdale Drive; Frederick, Maryland 21702; United States
- Type: Dinner theater

Construction
- Opened: 1990 (As Keynote Dinner Theatre)

Website
- http://www.wayoffbroadway.com/

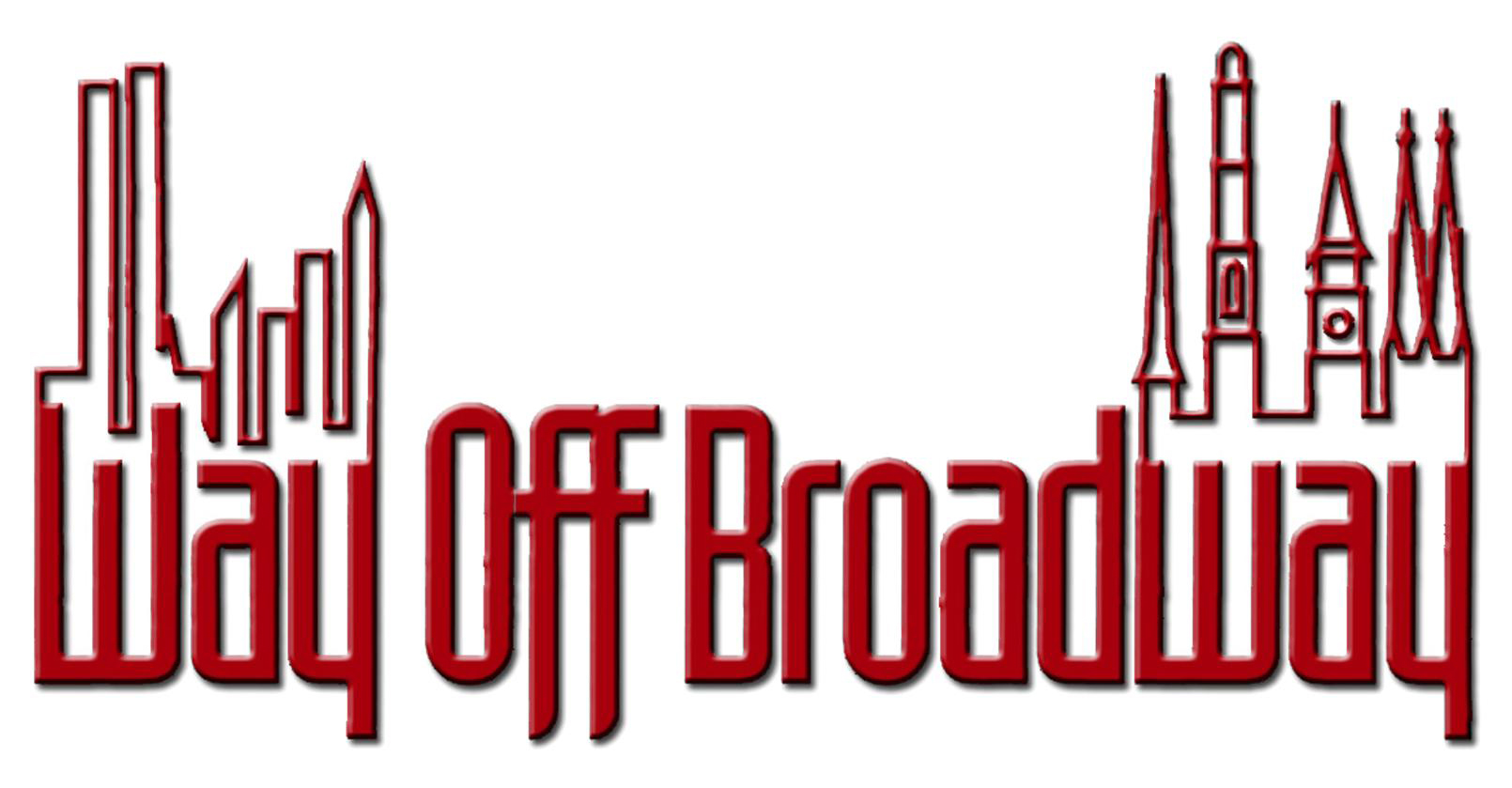

The Way Off Broadway Dinner Theater, also known as Way Off Broadway or WOB, is a regional dinner theater located in Frederick, Maryland, United States.

== History ==
The theater was first launched in 1990 as the Keynote Dinner Theatre under the direction of Don Wiswell with a production of the musical Grease. It was not until 1995, when the theater was purchased by the partnership of Pete Peterson, Terrance Warfield, and Jim Watkins, that it was renamed Way Off Broadway. The following year, Way Off Broadway's Children's Theatre was created, opening with an original production of Sleeping Beauty. It was also in 1996, a year and a half after they bought the theater, that Peterson, Warfield, and Watkins sold WOB to Susan Thornton, the creator of the Children's Theatre. Way Off Broadway was purchased by the Kiska family in 2002, beginning their ownership of the theater with a production of A Funny Thing Happened on the Way to the Forum.

In 2026, the theater was sold to the owners of The Washington County Playhouse (the sister theater of the original Keynote Dinner Theatre), Shawn R. and Laura J. Martin.

The first production of their inaugural season was The Hollow by Agatha Christie.

== Productions ==
=== Mainstage ===
Each season, Way Off Broadway produces five to six Broadway-style mainstage productions. These range from the classics by Rodgers and Hammerstein and Kender and Ebb, to contemporary and current stage shows by Andrew Lloyd Webber and David Yazbek. Way Off Broadway has been credited with bringing many theatrical premieres to the area. In 2009, WOB was one of the first theaters in the country to obtain the rights to produce a regional theater production of the musical comedy The Wedding Singer. Neil Simon’s The Goodbye Girl - The Musical, La Cage aux Folles, Thoroughly Modern Millie, Mel Brooks’ The Producers, All Shook Up, and Dirty Rotten Scoundrels all made their western Maryland regional theater debuts at WOB. During 2024, as part of WOB's 30th Anniversary Season, the theater produced the first production of Diana - The Musical following its Broadway premiere.

=== Theatre For Young Audiences ===
From 1996 - 2017, Way Off Broadway produced a full Theatre for Young Audiences season each year, presents four productions geared for young audiences and their families. These were originally musical adaptations of popular fairy tales and children's stories written specifically for the theater. Most notably was WOB's 2005 world premiere stage production of Mr. Willowby's Christmas Tree, based on the 1963 children's book of the same name by Robert Barry. Until that time, Jim Henson’s Muppets had been the only group to obtain the rights to adapt Barry’s story, turning it into a television Christmas special in 1995. In an interview, Barry later said he preferred Way Off Broadway’s adaptation, which had been written by Susan Thornton, the children’s theatre’s director, over the Muppets version.

In 2011, The Children’s Theatre at Way Off Broadway began to change its productions line-up to include stage versions of popular children’s books and movies. These were shows like Disney’s 101 Dalmatians, Cinderella, Aladdin, Peter Pan, and Alice in Wonderland; two incredibly successful runs of Pinkalicious – The Musical; Nickelodeon’s Dora the Explorer Live! Dora’s Pirate Adventure; a premiere production of Molly Shannon’s Tilly the Trickster; and the area's first production of Junie B. Jones - The Musical.

Beginning in 2018, the theatre transitioned to offering its theater for young audiences productions as special events held periodically throughout the year.

In the fall of 2019, Way Off Broadway co-produced the first regional theatre production of the new musical comedy The Book of Merman, which had made its Off-Broadway premiere the winter before at New York’s St. Luke’s Theatre. WOB’s production starred Melissa Ann Martin as Ethel Merman, Joseph Waeyaert as Elder Braithwaite, and Paul Cabell as Elder Shumway. The production was co-produced with Justin M. Kiska and Jessica Billones.

== Venue ==
The theater is located in Frederick, Maryland, west of Baltimore and north of Washington, D.C. Since it opened, it has operated in the same location, in the Willowtree Plaza along Route 40, also known as Frederick’s "Golden Mile." A traditional proscenium style theater, Way Off Broadway serves a buffet meal to its audiences, who watch the show from their tables. The serving staff is made up of cast and crew members from the productions.

== See also ==
- List of dinner theaters
