= La Comedia Dinner Theatre =

Dinner theatre in Springboro, Ohio, US

- La Comedia Dinner Theatre
- Interactive map of La Comedia Dinner Theatre
- Address: 765 W. Central Ave. Springboro, OH 45066; United States
- Coordinates: 39.56223°N 84.25920°W
- Owner: Dave and Sherry Gabert
- Capacity: 612
- Type: Off-Off Broadway; Dinner Theatre

Construction
- Opened: 1975, January 28
- Years active: 50

Website
- http://www.lacomedia.com/

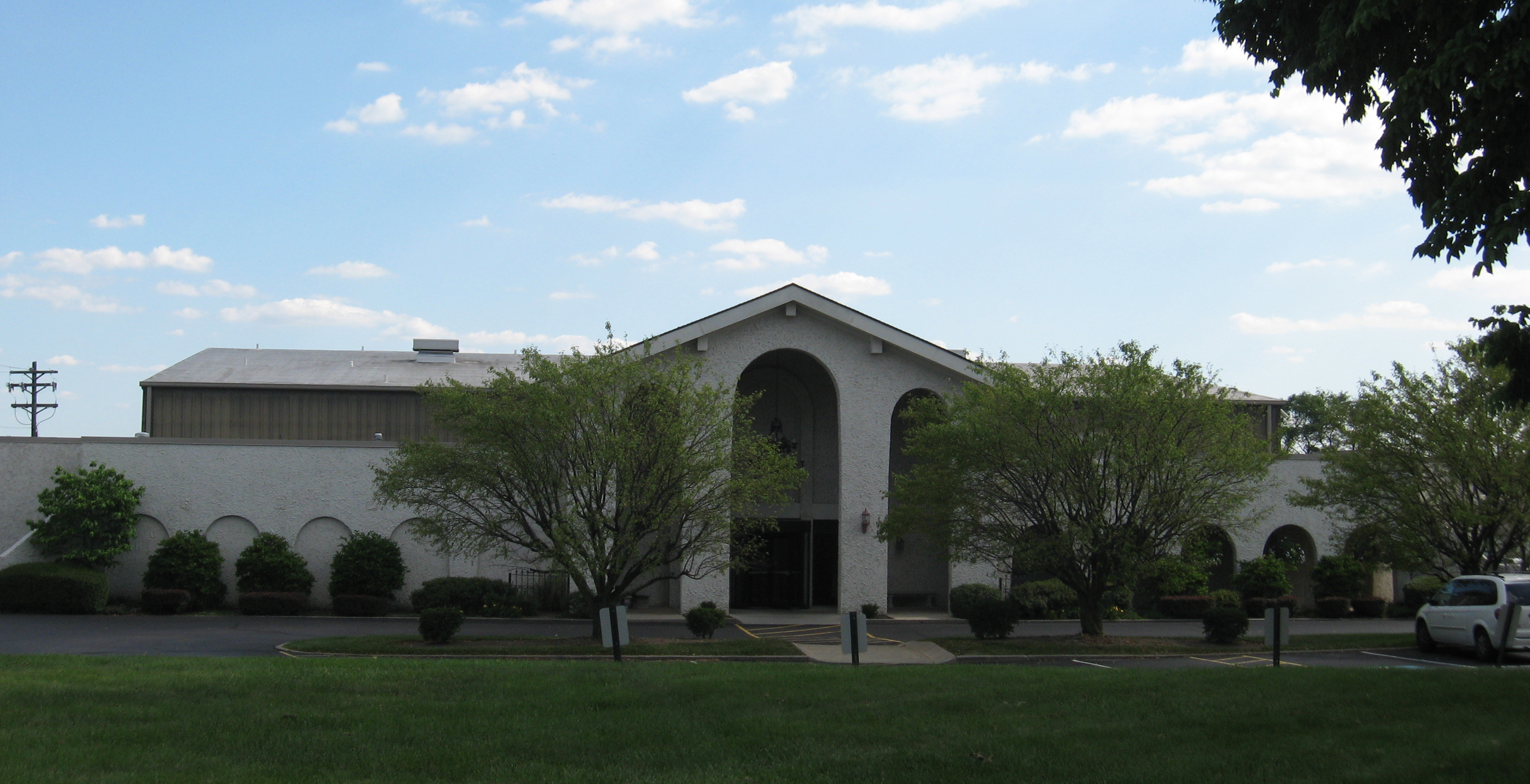
La Comedia Dinner Theatre storefront

La Comedia Dinner Theatre is located in Springboro, Ohio. La Comedia is one of the nation's oldest and largest professional dinner theaters with Broadway-style productions. Having entertained over six million guests, 2021 marks the 47th season. The theatre produces between 6 and 9 productions each year and also hosts music groups for short gigs. Guests are first served dinner buffet style and the show follows. Each production plays for about 6 to 8 weeks.

La Comedia opened January 28, 1975 with the production of 'A Funny Thing Happened on the Way to the Forum' under the direction of E.Mac Vestal, Jr. One of the first advertisements for the dinner theatre announced an "Exciting dinner and a Live Professional Broadway Stage Play", "both for only $6.65". At age 27, Joe and Marilyn Mitchell were the original producers and owners of La Comedia Dinner Theatre until they sold the establishment in 1987.

Former owners Joe Adkins and his family announced the sale of La Comedia to Dave and Sherry Gabert of Dayton, in a November 18, 2023 Facebook post.

== See also ==
- List of dinner theaters
