= Derby Dinner Playhouse =

Dinner theatre in Clarksville, Indiana, US

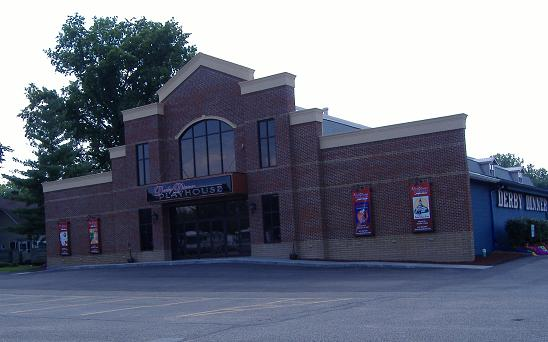
- Outside of Derby Dinner Playhouse
- Interactive map of Derby Dinner Playhouse
- Address: Clarksville, Indiana; United States
- Coordinates: 38.2806°N 85.7554°W

Website
- www.derbydinner.com

Derby Dinner Playhouse is a dinner theatre located in Clarksville, Indiana, that opened in 1974. The Derby is the only dinner theatre in the Louisville, Kentucky, area and in southern Indiana.

== History ==
In the early 1970s, several local business owners saw the need for an entertainment center that could host convention business, concerts and theatre productions. The Windmill Dinner Theatre group, which owned dinner theatres in Cincinnati and Indianapolis, constructed and managed the facility. Carolyn Thomas, then Derby General Manager, partnered with Bekki Jo Schneider to buy the center in 1985. As of 2009, Thomas was retired, but she and Schneider, who produces and oversees all aspects of the business, still own over 50% of the company. The other half is owned by small investors.

== Food ==
Derby Dinner offers a freshly prepared homestyle American buffet featuring fried chicken, fish, roast beef, a salad bar, hot rolls and beverages. Bountiful desserts, including the famous peanut butter pie, are a tradition. A full bar is also available. The "Overtures" vocal ensemble entertains patrons prior to the performance.

== Facility ==
The venue uses the theatre-in-the-round configuration, and the actors are professionals. Performances are on Tuesday through Sunday nights, with matinées on Wednesday and Sunday. Each year, the Derby presents eight mainstage shows, four Children's productions and ten concerts.

== See also ==
- List of attractions and events in the Louisville metropolitan area
- List of dinner theaters
