= Gaslight Theatre =

Theater company and theater in Enid, Oklahoma, United States

Coordinates: 36°23′56″N 97°52′47″W

- Enid Community Theatre
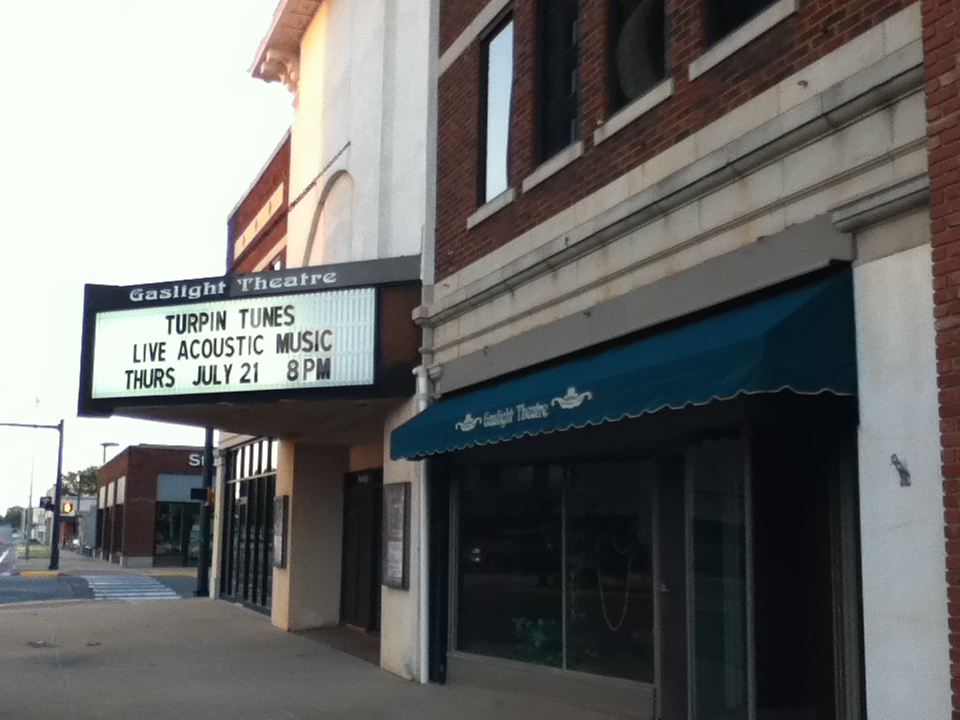
- The Gaslight Theatre
- Interactive map of Gaslight Theatre
- Address: 122 N. Independence; Enid, Oklahoma

Construction
- Opened: 1966

Website
- http://www.gaslighttheatre.org

The Gaslight Theatre is a nonprofit theatre troupe and venue in Enid, Oklahoma. Founded in 1966 as the Enid Community Theatre, the group stages productions of ten plays per year, including Shakespeare in the Park, musicals, and dinner theatre. Since 1989 Gaslight has called the historic Billings Theatre its home. It is located in the Enid Downtown Historic District.

== History ==
The Enid Community Theatre was formed in 1966, first performing at the former K-GEO TV studio on the 200 Block of East Randolph in Enid. Later, a converted warehouse in the 200 block of East Maple was the group's venue.

The Gaslight Theatre group renovated a former live theater and cinema building in 1989, located at 221 North Independence in Enid. It was built in 1924 by the Boller Brothers to house the Billings Theatre, which featured vaudeville acts and other live performances. In later decades a number of movie theaters were successively housed in the building, including the Criterion Movie House, the Chief Movie Theatre, and Cinema Twin.

== Productions ==
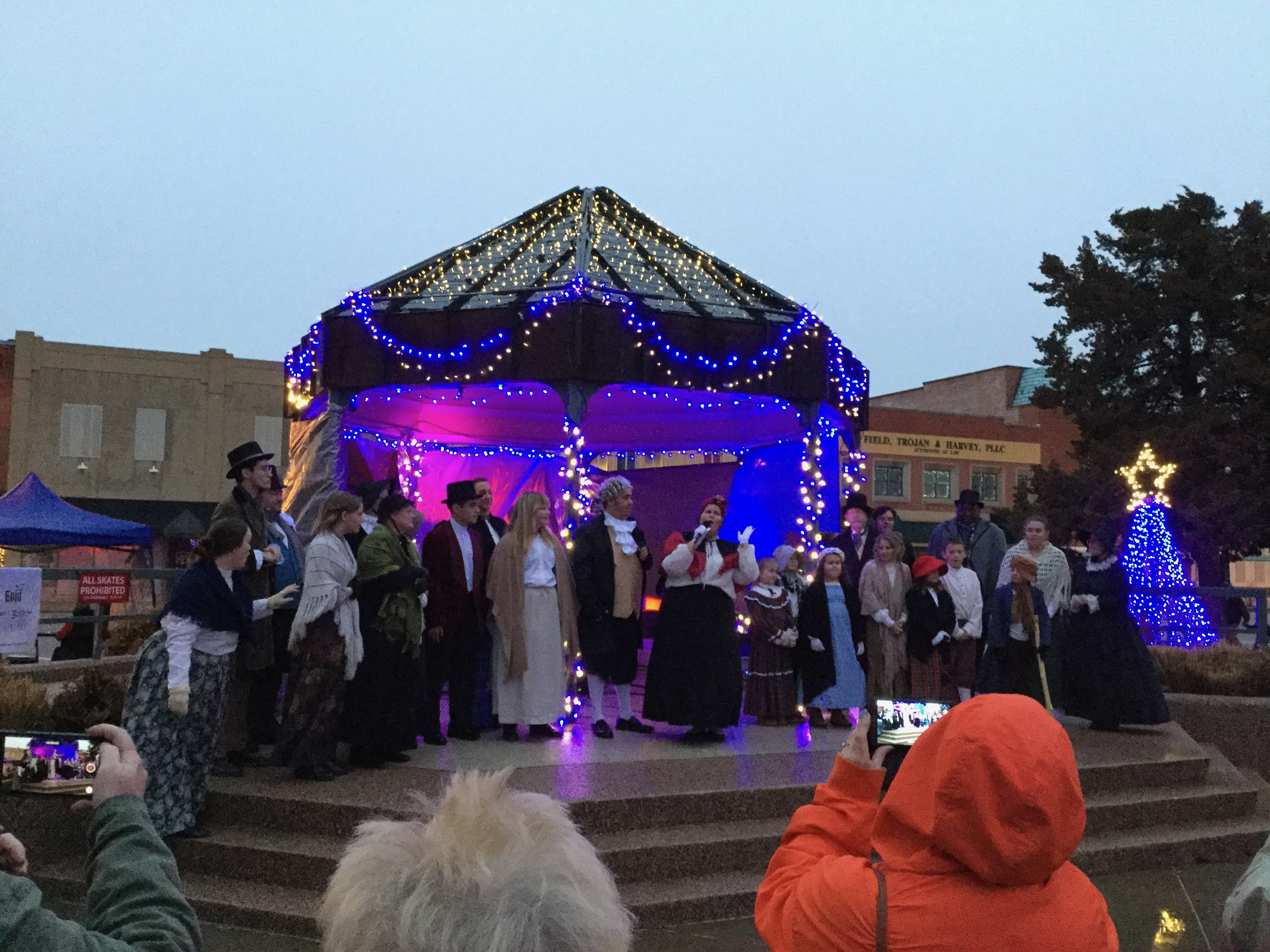
Actors from Gaslight Theatre at the gazebo in downtown Enid, Oklahoma during Enid Lights Up the Plains

Gaslight presents ten productions each year, including five regular season shows and a summer musical. In addition, dinner theatre is presented at the Stride Bank Center, Shakespeare in the Park is presented free in Government Springs Park, area teenagers present an annual play under the moniker of Gaslight Teens, and Gaslight host a children's drama camp production each summer.

Gaslight Theatre renovated their additional black box theater The Turpin Little Theatre in 2017 and reopened in 2018 with the new name The Turpin at Gaslight. The Turpin is named for long-time Gaslight actor, director, and supporter Dr. Jerry Turpin.

Gaslight Theatre holds an annual awards ceremony to honor volunteers and stage talent. The annual Charlie Awards Ceremony is named for Charles Norman Duff, a long-time supporter of the Gaslight Theatre. Volunteers regularly staff both onstage and backstage with support from community residents.

== See also ==
- List of dinner theaters
