= Joey and Maria's Comedy Italian Wedding =

Joey and Maria's Comedy Italian Wedding is an interactive dinner theater show written by Darlyne Franklin. Rights to the show are owned by Dillstar Productions of Rancho Cucamonga, California and is leased by Beverly Stickney, (president). The shows have been in Anaheim, California, San Diego, California, Palm Springs, California, Chicago, Illinois, Hartford, Connecticut and Boston, Massachusetts.

The show was written by the husband-and-wife team of Paul and Darlyne Franklin.

Audience members are active participants in the wedding nuptials and subsequent reception, which take place in a restaurant in Boston's North End owned by the bride's cousin and the play's master of ceremonies, Carmine Cannoli. The wedding, performed by "St. Anthony's" parish priest Pastor Fazool, brings together the families of two young lovers, Joseph Anthony Gnocchi and Maria Angelina Cavatelli. The cast of characters are all, in fact, named after Italian dishes. Chaos ensues during the ceremony with the unexpected arrival of Joey's provocatively dressed ex-girlfriend, Viola Vermicelli. Viola, it seems, is still in love with Joey. Despite Joey's roving eye, he's very much in love with Maria and loudly protests Viola's arrival. After the couple is joined, the cast leaves the room and are reintroduced one at a time by Carmine. A toast is raised by Joey's scatterbrained best man, Rocco Ravioli. During the toast, dinner is being served to the guests.

Upon its completion, the cast moves about the tables, chatting & flirting with the guests. After dinner, the party itself commences with traditional Italian-American flourishes such as a sing-along and a tarantella. The traditional bouquet and garter tosses place the guests who catch them in a rather bizarre and extremely funny onstage situation in which the male guest is asked to remove the garter from the leg of the female guest using only his teeth. The arrival of Maria's Mafioso godfather Don Ziti (often played by a selected good-sport audience member) also means the arrival of a large sum of money for the new couple. The "money" is handed over to Joey's cousin, bridesmaid Louisa Ravioli, for safekeeping. The money later turns up missing and a male guest is "accused" of stealing it. He's led out the door and is met by a hail of gunfire... which misses. Joey & Maria come back dressed in snazzy traveling clothes, ready for one final dance, then off to honeymoon in Vegas & spend some of that wedding dough... "and they all lived happily ever after!"

Very few parts of Joey and Maria's Comedy Italian Wedding are scripted, with the momentum of the play maintained by ad-libbed slapstick humor.

== See also ==
- Tony n' Tina's Wedding
