= Tony n' Tina's Wedding =

Tony n’ Tina’s Wedding
- Original language: English
- Written by: Artificial Intelligence comedy troupe
- Characters: Anthony Nunzio, Jr. Valentina Lynne Vitale et al.
- Genre: Environmental theatre Interactive theatre
- Setting: Italian American wedding Wedding reception

Premiere
- Date: November 11, 1985
- Place: New York City
- Official website

Tony n’ Tina's Wedding is an "environmental/immersive theatre" event based on a traditional Italian-American wedding and reception, with warm and intrusive stereotypes exaggerated for comic effect. Audience members are treated as guests at the wedding by the interactive, improvisational comedy cast.

Since opening February 14, 1988 in New York City, the piece has been staged in over 100 locations worldwide, including cities in Canada, Japan, Germany, the United Kingdom, and Australia.

Tony n’ Tina’s Wedding shares some similarities with a 1969 Australian play called Dimboola, by Jack Hibberd.

== History ==
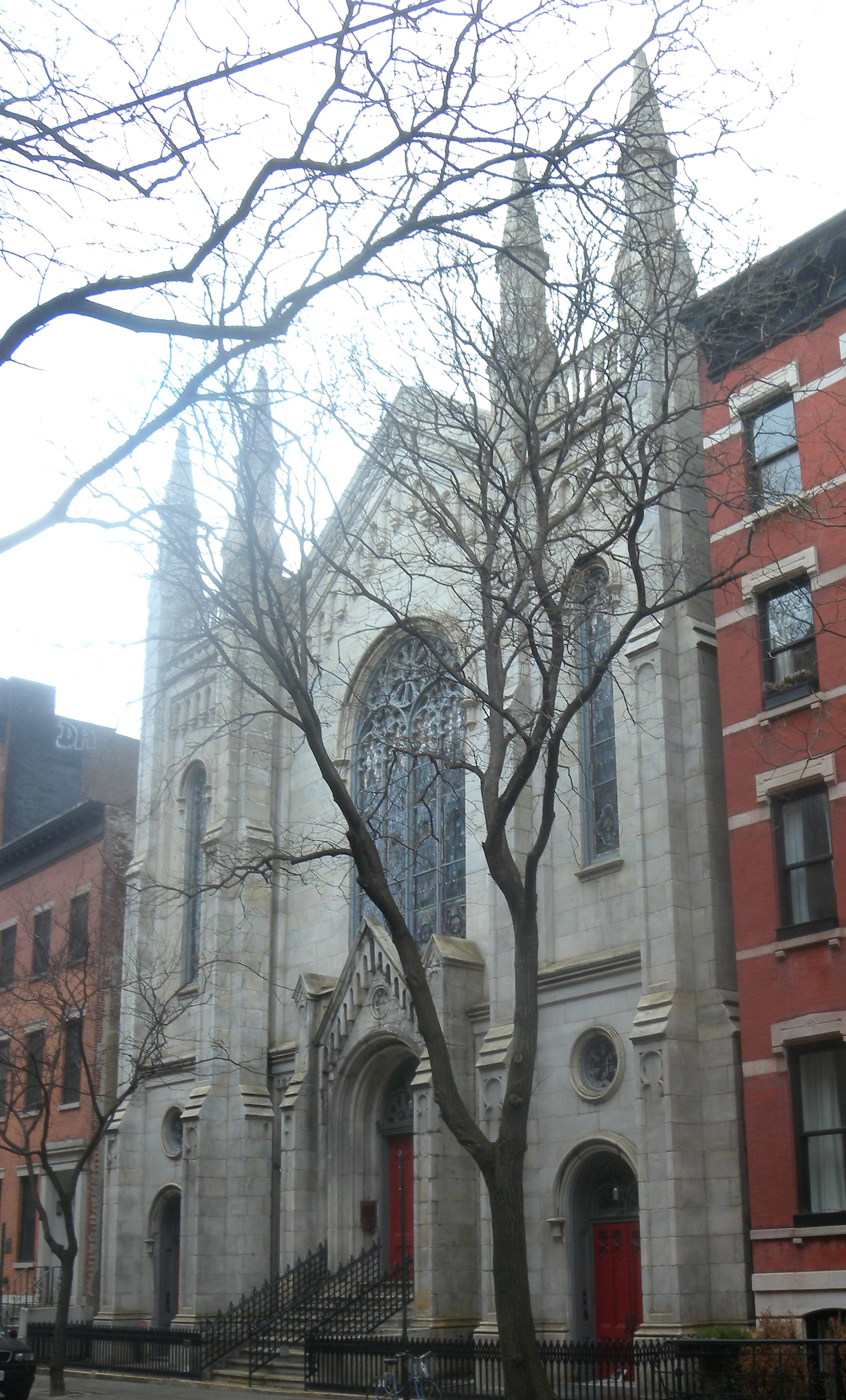
The setting for the wedding in the first off-off-Broadway production was the Washington Square United Methodist Church.

Thirteen original cast members share the copyright: Kevin Alexander, Tom Allen, James Altuner, Mark Campbell, Nancy Cassaro, Elizabeth Dennehy, Chris Fracchiolla, Jack Fris, Mark Nassar, Patricia Cregan Navarra, Larry Pellegrini, Susan Varon, and Moira Wilson. According to Cassaro, "Tony and Tina evolved when Mark [Nassar] and I were in college and found ourselves the outcasts of the drama department. We were doing improvisations of a young couple having a fight, and they became so real that the dorm master called wondering what was the matter. It snowballed as we enlisted other friends who created other characters."

The show was first performed in an American Legion Hall on West 14th Street on November 11, 1985. The off-off-Broadway production opened on February 6, 1988, with the first wedding held at the Washington Square Methodist Church in Greenwich Village and the reception at Carmelita's, a reception hall at 150 East 14th Street. It then played at St. John's Lutheran Church on Christopher Street before moving to a long run at St. Luke's Theatre, then at the Edison Hotel, and finally at Sweet Caroline's before ending its 22-year run on July 25, 2010. The original cast included the above 13 actors and also Mickey Abbate, Joanna Cocca, Kia Colton, Joe Corcoran, Vincent Floriani, Towner Gallagher, Eli Ganias, Jacob Harran, Jennifer Heftler, Elizabeth Herring, Tom Hogan, Monica Horan, Kevin A. Leonidas, Denise Moses, Phil Rosenthal, Charlie Terrat, and Michael Winther. It was originally produced by Joe and Dan Corcoran, two Hofstra alumni just starting on Wall Street.

Tony n’ Tina’s Wedding has been hosted in more than 200 cities including New York City, Las Vegas, Vancouver (where it had a 14-year run, closing only due to the 2010 Winter Olympics), Toronto, Montreal, Portland, Detroit, Dallas, Minneapolis, Orlando, San Francisco, Raleigh, and Chicago.

== Film adaptation ==
Tony n’ Tina’s Wedding: The Movie
- Directed by: Roger Paradiso
- Written by: Roger Paradiso
- Produced by: Tony Travis; Michael Tadross; Mark Lipsky
- Starring: Joey McIntyre; Mila Kunis; Adrian Grenier
- Distributed by: Emerging Pictures
- Release date: November 30, 2007 (Limited)
- Running time: 106 minutes (theatrical version); 110 minutes (DVD)
- Country: United States

The play was "freely" adapted for film by writer-director Roger Paradiso— "filmed primarily from the point of view of a lisping videographer"—with Joey McIntyre and Mila Kunis playing the title characters. The film premiered on May 3, 2004, at the Tribeca Film Festival and received a limited theatrical run three-and-a-half years later.

Upon its release, Slant Magazine gave the film zero out of four stars, calling it a "relentlessly unfunny detonation" of the play, and a "tin-eared disaster" featuring "profanity delivered at a Mamet-like rate." The New York Times called the film a "dated send-up of low-class comportment" and, noting the film's limited release, said, "exactly how limited will depend on your tolerance for tasteless behavior, extravagant overacting and a decibel level to rival the unveiling of Oprah's Favorite Things."

The film has since been released on DVD.

== See also ==
- Joey and Maria's Comedy Italian Wedding
- Joni and Gina's Wedding
