= Mr. Willowby's Christmas Tree =

- Based on: Mr. Willowby's Christmas Tree by Robert Barry Kermit the Frog by Jim Henson
- Written by: Mitchell Kriegman
- Directed by: Jon Stone
- Starring: Robert Downey Jr. Stockard Channing; Leslie Nielsen
- Narrated by: Kermit the Frog
- Music by: Michael & Patty Silversher
- Country of origin: United States
- Original language: English

Production
- Executive producer: Michael K. Frith
- Producer: Ritamarie Peruggi
- Cinematography: Tony Cutrono
- Editors: Jason Bielski; David Gumpel; Mark Oberthaler
- Running time: 30 minutes
- Production company: Jim Henson Productions

Original release
- Network: CBS
- Release: December 6, 1995

Mr. Willowby's Christmas Tree is a 1995 Christmas television special starring Robert Downey Jr., Stockard Channing and Leslie Nielsen, featuring Kermit the Frog as a narrator and various other Muppets created exclusively for the special. It was sponsored by Nabisco and originally aired December 6, 1995 on CBS.

The special was based on a 1963 book of the same name, by Robert Barry. In 2005, Mr. Willowby's Christmas Tree was adapted into a children's theater stage production by the Way Off Broadway Dinner Theatre.

== Plot ==
The special begins with the song "The Perfect Tree", which features both Mr. Willowby (Robert Downey Jr.) singing about his desire to find the perfect Christmas tree and, within Willowby's house, a father mouse singing that he will go out to get a tree for his family (his two children, Beverly and Ned, decide to come with him). After the song is finished, Willowby asks his butler, Baxter (Leslie Nielsen) where his tree is.

The special then follows the family of mice out in the woods looking for a tree. Eventually, the father mouse spots "the perfect tree", but it is far too large to fit into their tiny living quarters, so the family climbs the tree so that he can chop off the very top. Right when they reach the top, however, Willowby's lumberjacks arrive at the scene and cut the entire tree down (as they sing the song "We're Lumberjacks"). The family of mice hold on to the tree as it is brought to Willowby's house.

The tree is set up in the house, and Willowby notices it is slightly too tall. He has Baxter cut off the very top, and then tells him to bring up the top part of the tree (which the mouse family is in) to one of his staff, Swedish maid Miss Adelaide (Channing), whom Willowby describes as being a very lonely person who doesn't even come down for Christmas. However, this is part of Mr. Willowby's hidden agenda of getting Baxter and Adelaide to admit their secret love for each other.

Baxter does so, and while he is meeting with Adelaide, she describes her family's traditions at Christmas time. While they are talking, a romantic interest between the two of them is insinuated. At one point, Baxter notices the father mouse on the floor, but Adelaide says it is Christmastime and thus would be wrong to kill the mouse at this time. She places the mouse up on a banister, and he returns to the top of the tree with his children.

After Baxter leaves, Adelaide notices that the tree in her room is slightly too tall, so she cuts off the top and throws it out the window (with the mouse family in it). Before the father mouse can cut off the top, a bear picks up the tree and brings it home to her den and family to use as his own Christmas tree.

The bears engage in their Christmas festivities (The Honeypot Waltz), and eventually notice that the tree is too tall. They cut off the top (which once again has the mice in it) and throw it outside. The family of mice laugh at all they've been through that evening, only to then be picked up (along with the remnants of the tree) by an owl.

Meanwhile, back at the manor, Mr. Willowby is piling gifts around the tree, but notices he doesn't hear Baxter anywhere. To his great satisfaction, he quickly finds the butler standing in the snow underneath Miss Adelaide's window, listening to her sing.

The owls set up the tree in their own den, and then engage in an angelic chorus (the mouse family speculates that they never knew owls could be so musical). Eventually, they too notice that the tree they have is too tall, and so they cut off the top and throw it (along with the mice) outside.

The father mouse then raises his axe to cut off a tree from the remnants that have been thrown outside, but then realizes that the tree as it is actually the perfect size for his own home. He and the other mice return to the manor. But Baxter catches Beverly by the tail, grousing over the possible mouse infestation. Fortunately at that moment, Willowby's Christmas Ball is about to begin, and as the guests arrive, he hears Miss Adelaide leaving her room. Knowing how she would feel, he releases Beverly and tells her to "Hurry home for Christmas." The mice race into their den with the tree, cheering that their Christmas can begin.

Meanwhile, Mr. Willowby's Christmas party is in full swing. Adelaide comes down this time, and begins to dance with Baxter. With Mr. Willowby joining their dance for a moment, he turns to gaze upon the tree, and launches into a final rendition of "The Perfect Tree".

The show ends with the narrator Kermit The Frog leaving the darkened manor at party's end, wishing the audience Happy Holidays and good night. As the credits roll, Ned and Beverly begin relating their adventure to their mother while father dozes by the fireplace.

== Cast ==
- Robert Downey Jr. as Mr. Willowby
- Stockard Channing as Miss Adelaide
- Leslie Nielsen as Baxter the Butler

=== Muppet performers ===
- Bill Barretta as Bear
- Julianne Buescher as Beverly Mouse
- Steve Whitmire as Bear, Kermit the Frog, Owl
- Kevin Clash as Father Mouse, Owl
- Bruce Lanoil as Owl, Bear
- David Rudman as Ned Mouse

== Accolades ==
Score- and songwriters Patty and Michael Silversher were nominated at the 48th Primetime Emmy Awards for the song "The Perfect Tree". The special also won a Casting Society of America award for "Best Casting for TV Nighttime Special".
