= Stagedoor Dinner Theatre =

Dinner theatre in Brisbane, Australia

Coordinates: 27°26′50.62″S 153°02′18″E

StageDoor Dinner Theatre was officially opened on 17 July 2002 by Judy Cornwell (Daisy from Keeping Up Appearances). StageDoor Dinner Theatre is Brisbane's first permanent dinner theatre, with more than 54 productions to date.

The dinner theatre is located in the lower level of the Twelfth Night Theatre complex in Bowen Hills, Brisbane. This is the permanent home to Starbuck Productions, a Queensland-based production company. Starbuck was established in early 1990s and has produced live entertainment in venues such as the Queensland Performing Arts Centre, The Suncorp Piazza, Seagulls International Showroom, the Twelfth Night Theatre and in regional touring venues throughout south east Queensland.

Productions have included Hollywood Legend Mickey Rooney, Rhonda Burchmore, The Australian Tom Jones Spectacular and Little Shop of Horrors.

The company is owned and run by radio and television producer and performer Damien Lee and dance school proprietor Doreen Thomas. Now at the StageDoor Dinner Theatre they have produced the classic Neil Simon comedy The Odd Couple, Dan Goggin's Nunsense, the award-winning rock musical Return to the Forbidden Planet, the family Christmas Pantomime SC Superstar, the New Year's cabaret Rock Down The Clock, the heartwarming British drama Beautiful Thing, and the Southern Hemisphere Premiere of Gilligan's Island: The Musical which had a run of 34 weeks, over three productions.

StageDoor has also held a number of single performance shows, for example featuring Tom Burlinson, Amanda Muggleton and more recently Ian Maurice.

== Productions ==
=== 2013 ===
- Gilligan’s Island the Musical
- The Great Easter Egg Hunt
- Tuckshop the Musical

=== 2012 ===
- Rock Down the Clock
- Solid Gold Disco
- Ghouls Night Out
- David the Friendly Dragon
- Getting Even with Steven
- Mid Life the Crisis Musical
- Alladin and his Really Cool Lamp

=== 2011 ===
- Rock N Roll INFERNO
- David The Friendly Dragon
- Classic Elizabeth Taylor for Mother's Day
- Getting Even With Steven
- 1970s CABARET PARTY
- MID-LIFE! The Crisis Musical
- Aladdin and His Really Cool Lamp
- Santa Rocks
- Broadway Busted
- The Sacred Garden

=== 2010 ===
- Rock Down the Clock
- Rock n Roll Inferno
- SC Superstar
- Behind the Bright lights
- The Super Family Fun Show
- The Natasha York Duo
- Mother and Son
- The Great Easter Egg Hunt – 10–18 April
- Dare to be Bare – March – April
- Rocky Horror Show – February – March

=== 2009 ===
- Back to the 70s 80s 90s – 31 December
- G'Day Santa – 5 – 24 December
- Club 80s – 23 October – 19 December
- No News is Good News – 15 August – 17 October
- Super Family Fun Show – 19 September – 4 October
- Deathtrap – 19 June – 8 August
- Stiff – 17 – April 2008
- I Have a Hunch – 13 February – 111 April

=== 2008 ===
- Pop Goes the 70s – 31 December
- Spaced Out Santa – 6 – 24 December
- Solid Gold Disco – 22 October – 20 December
- Mavis Bramston Reloaded – 20 August – 18 October
- How to Get Almost Anyone to Sleep with You – 10 October
- Stagedoor Unplugged – 18 June – 16 August
- Little Tin Soldier – 30 June – 13 July
- Ian Maurice's Mother's Day Cabaret – Sunday 11 May
- Bouncers – 19 April – 14 June
- Ian Maurice Bears All with Natalie Mead – 30 March
- Ian Maurice Bears All – 24 February
- The Outback Pub – 14 February – 19 April

=== 2007 ===
- Rock Down the Clock – 31 December 2007
- Santa Rocks – 3–24 December 2007
- Rock n Roll Inferno – 12 October – 22 December 2007
- Agatha Christie's The Hollows – 10 August to 6 October 2007
- Naked Boys Singing – 8 June to 4 August 2007
- The Enchanted Forest – 25 June to 8 July
- Shirley Valentine – 6 April to 2 June 2007
- Ian Maurice's Mother's Day Cabaret – Sunday 13 May
- City Gym – The Musical – 2 February to 31 March 2007

=== 2006 ===
- Rock N Roll Beach Party – 31 December 2006
- Gilligan's Island: The Musical – 12 October to 23 December 2006
- Santa Down Under – 4 to 24 December 2006
- Nunsensations: The Nunsense Vegas Revue – 3 August to 7 October 2006
- Ghost Writers – 15 to July29uly 2006
- Ian Maurice – Live in cabaret – 23 July 2006
- The Emperor's New Clothes – 26 June – 9 July 2006
- Broadway Busted – 29 March- 27 May
- Me and Jezebel – 3 February to 25 March 2006

=== 2005 ===
- Blues Brothers Bash – 31 December 2005
- Pirates Down Under – 3 November to 24 December
- SC Superstar – 28 November to 24 December
- Walk this way – 22 September to 29 October 2005
- Friends and Relations – 4 August to 17 September 2005
- No News is Good News – 9 – June 2005
- David the Friendly Dragon – 20 June – 3 July 2005
- Gilligan's Island: The Musical – 31 – March 2005
- Agatha Christie's Murder on the Nile – 3 February to 26 March 2005

=== 2004 ===
- Stayin Alive 05 Disco – 31 December 2004
- Spaced Out Santa – 29 – November 2004
- Forbidden Planet – 28 October- 18 December
- Dare to be Bare – 23 September – 23 October
- A Swell Party – 26 – August
- The Sacred Garden – 1 – July 2004
- The Great Fairytale Robbery – 28 – June
- The Rise and Fall of Little Voice – 6 May – 26 June 2004
- Bouncers – 11 March – 1 May 2004
- Beautiful Thing – 22 March – 13 April,
- The First Sunday in December – 29 January – 6 March 2004
- Aladdin and his Really Cool Lamp – 5 to 25 January 2004

=== 2003 ===
- Rock Down the Clock – 31 December 2003
- SC Superstar – 3 to 24 December 2003
- The Outback Club – 6 – November 2003
- Look Who's Talking – 18 September – 1 November 2003
- Ladies Night – 26 August – 13 September 2003
- My Three Mothers in Law – 3 – July 2003
- An Intimate Luncheon with Amanda Muggleton – 17 July 2003
- Funny Money
- It's My Party and I'll Die If I Want To
- Rachel Beck & Ian Stenlake
- Tom Burlinson
- Sleuth

=== 2002 ===
- Rock Down the Clock – 31 December 2002
- SC Superstar – 25 November 22 December 2002
- A Bedful of Foreigners – 14 – October 2002
- Nunsense – 8 August – 27 October 2002
- The Odd Couple – 9 July to 8 August 2002

== See also ==
- List of dinner theaters
- Twelfth Night Theatre
- List of restaurant chains in Australia
