= Chanhassen Dinner Theatres =

Dinner theater and comedy club in Minnesota

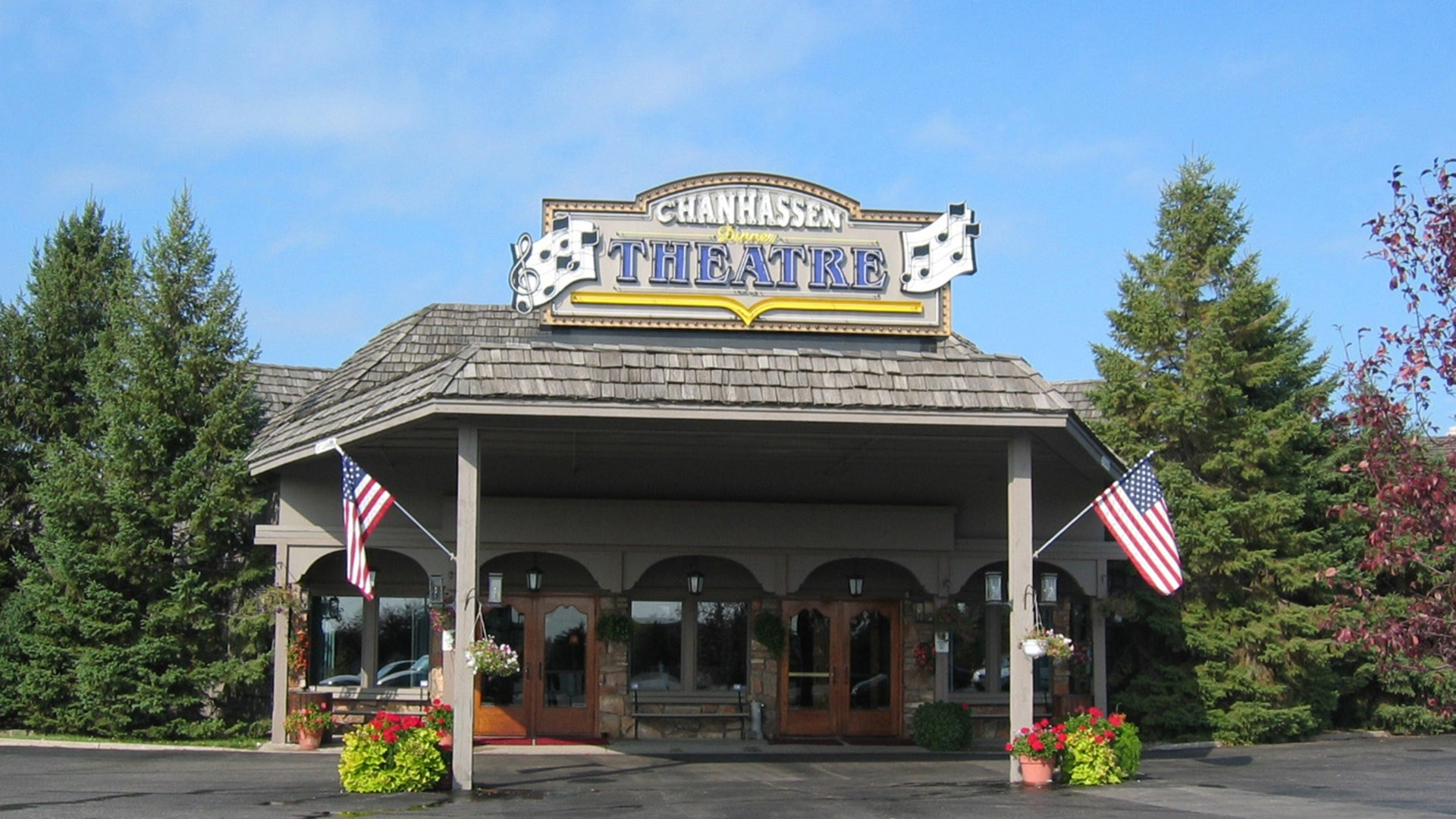
- Address: 501 West 78th Street; Chanhassen, Minnesota; United States

Construction
- Opened: 1968
- Years active: 1968 - Present
- Architect: Herbert "Herb" Bloomberg

Website
- https://chanhassendt.com/

The Chanhassen Dinner Theatres is a dinner theater, comedy club and venue located in Chanhassen, Minnesota. As a part of the National Dinner Theatre Association (NDTA), the Chanhassen Dinner Theatres is often cited as one of the largest professional dinner theatre companies in the United States.

== History ==
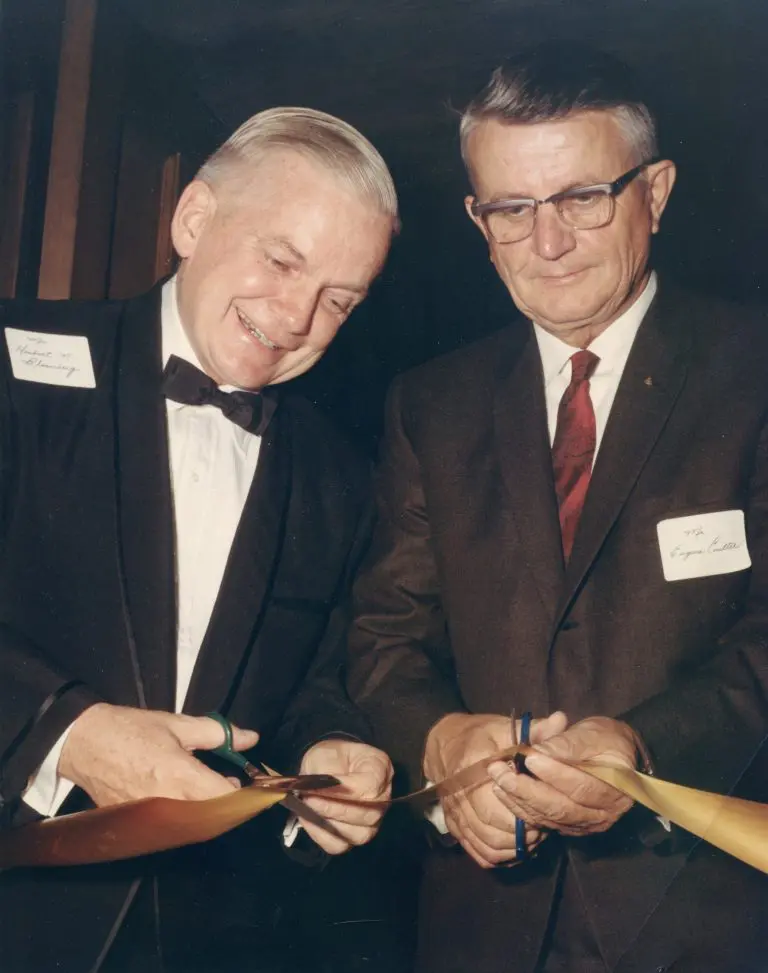
Founder Herb Bloomberg (left) & Chanhassen Mayor Eugene Coulter (right) cut the ribbon on opening night, October 11, 1968

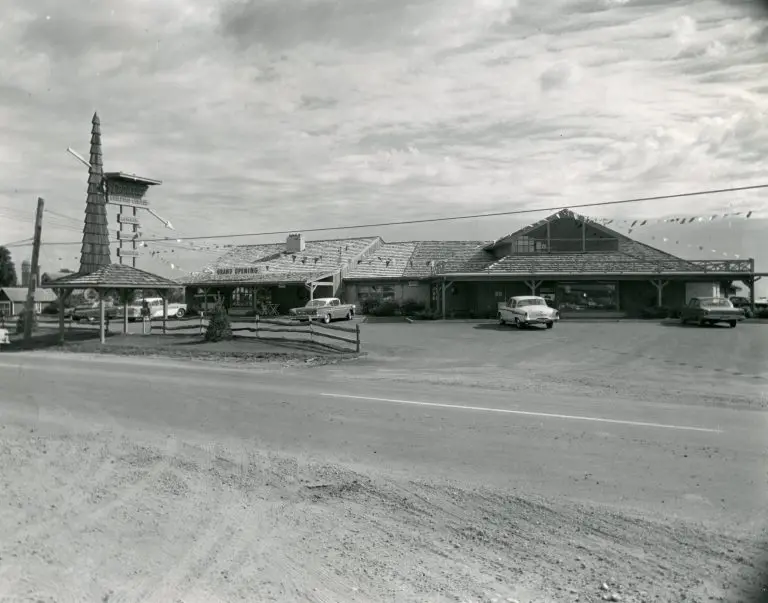
The original "The Frontier" building of the Chanhassen Dinner Theatres

=== The Bloomberg Family ===
Herbert "Herb" Bloomberg and Carolyn Bloomberg founded the Chanhassen Dinner Theatres (CDT) in 1968. The Bloomberg family first moved to Chanhassen in 1958 from the Twin Cities area. Herb was a drafter and builder who had previously designed several buildings throughout Minnesota including; the Old Log Theatre in Minnetonka, Minnesota, the Hazeltine National Golf Club's Clubhouse in Chaska, Minnesota, the Quadna Mountain Ski Lodge and Chalet in Hill City, Minnesota, the Gold Bond Lodge on Lake Minnesuing in Wisconsin, the conservation of the St. James Hotel in Red Wing, Minnesota, and numerous custom homes. As fans of Broadway theatre from their frequent vacations in New York City, the Bloombergs purchased land in Chanhassen, Minnesota and eventually built a dinner theater which opened in 1968. From 1968-1989 the Bloomberg family operated the facility as a theatre, comedy club, and venue.

=== Theatre Productions ===
The theatre's first production was How to Succeed in Business Without Really Trying. Other featured musical productions include Annie, I Do! I Do!, Fiddler on the Roof, Les Misérables, and Joseph and the Amazing Technicolor Dreamcoat.

=== Stevie Ray's Comedy Cabaret ===
Besides theatre, the CDT also offers a comedy club named Stevie Ray's Comedy Cabaret. Stevie Ray’s is a comedy troupe which also offers classes on improv and stand-up comedy. The troupe, which formed in 1989 and first played the Dinner Theatre in 1993, took up permanent residency in April 2010, replacing The Playhouse.

=== New Ownership ===
In 1989 the Bloomberg family sold the Chanhassen Dinner Theatres to local Minnesota entrepreneur and owner of the Harlem Globetrotters, Thomas Scallen. In 2010 Scallen sold the complex to a group of local Chanhassen investors including Michael Brindisi and Tamara Kangas Erickson.

== In Media ==
The Chanhassen Dinner Theatres were used as a filming location for the José Feliciano scene in the 1996 Cohen brothers film Fargo. The Theatres were used as a stand-in for the Carlton Celebrity Room, once a real venue in Bloomington, Minnesota which had been demolished after a bankruptcy a decade before filming.
