= The Ninety Day Mistress =

- Original language: English
- Written by: J.J. Coyle
- Subject: sex
- Genre: comedy

Premiere
- Date: 25 October 1967
- Place: Biltmore Theatre

The Ninety Day Mistress is a 1967 sex comedy play. The original production starred Walter Abel, Martin Milner and Dyan Cannon and ran for 24 performances.

== Premise ==
A woman, Leona, will only go out with men for ninety days. She picks up a man, Danny, not knowing he's a private investigator hired to investigate her mother Judith.

== Opening night cast ==
- Walter Abel as Bill Hastings
- Doris Belack as Phyllis
- Dyan Cannon as Leona Hastings
- Nicolas Coster as Alan
- Ruth Ford as Judith Hastings
- Tony Lo Bianco as Rudy Avarian
- Martin Milner as Danny Liken

== Production history ==
The production marked the Broadway directorial debut of Philip Rose, who was a successful producer with plays such as A Raisin in the Sun and The Owl and the Pussycat. Rose read several scripts looking for something to direct, "referably a serious one that allowed me to make what I hoped would be an important and impressive Broadway directing debut. After reading many scripts, I finally settled on one which was not particularly serious or important and, as it turned out, not very impressive. But at the time I thought it would be funny and at the very least entertaining." It was the first produced play by J.J. Coyle who was a dancer and choreographer.

The play had a pre-Broadway try out in March 1967 at the Playhouse in New Jersey, where Owl and the Pussycat had been previewed. The cast included Darryl Hickman and Susan Anspach alongside Walter Abel, Mary Cooper, Dors Belack (Rose's wife), Tony Lo Bianco and Nicolas Coster. The Record called it "mirth provoking".

Hickman was replaced by Martin Milner, Cooper by Ruth Ford and Anspach by Beverley Ballard. THe new cast tried out the play at Bucks County. The Morning Call said it "makes for a night of humorous entertainment." Dyan Canon then replaced Ballard as the female lead. She had previously appeared on Broadway in The Fun Couple and toured in How to Succeed in Business but was best known at the time for being married to Cary Grant; she had just filed divorce proceedings against him. The play continued to tour out of town then played Broadway.

The play was profiled in the William Goldman book The Season: A Candid Look at Broadway. Goldman argued the play "had enough laughs to succeed. What killed it, I think, was that it was a masquerade and not well enough disguised: the notion of constantly compulsively changing partners because it gets so dull if you don’t is basically a homosexual one, and I think the play was basically a homosexual play." Goldman argued "if the girl had been cast as a boy, the play might have worked... People are always talking about how they'd like to see Virginia Woolf and Streetcar done all male. I'd like to add Ninety-Day Mistress to the list."

Rose wrote in his memoirs "we received mixed reviews, with many saying that the play was amusing but a piece of fluff, which was certainly valid. Our smallish audiences, however, were having a good time, while we fought to stay alive."

Cannon was married to Cary Grant at the time of the production. According to Rose, they were separated but during the play's run they reconciled, then split up again. Rose says Grant offered him money to keep the play going on the condition Cannon was fired from the production but Rose refused.

== Notes ==
- Rose, Philip (2001). You can't do that on Broadway!. Limelight Editions.
