= Joni and Gina's Wedding =

Joni and Gina's Wedding is a 2002 American interactive dinner theater comedy, conceived by Marianne Basford and written by Ann Lippert and Marianne Basford, under the production company Hilarity Ensues. It was originally produced by Basford and directed by Lippert. Audience members are "wedding guests" who mingle with actors posing as members of an eclectic wedding party.

The show opened on June 29, 2002, at the Oxwood Inn in Van Nuys, California, and subsequent productions have had successful runs at venues such as the Palms, the Hollywood Improv, the legendary El Cid and Oil Can Harry's. Celebrities such as Hannah Waddingham, Alison Arngrim from Little House on the Prairie and comedian/activist Robin Tyler have appeared in productions. A portion of the proceeds was donated to the Equality Campaign, which helped to fight against U.S. constitutional amendments that discriminate against same-sex marriage.

In 2004, Joni and Gina's Wedding won the Curve magazine Theater Award for being a positive presence in lesbian theater.

== Plot ==
An all-American military family joins an overbearing Jewish family as they attend their gay daughters' wedding and wild reception. The party begins as wedding guests arrive and mingle at the bar area where appetizers and cocktails are served. Family members also mingle and greet patrons who are soon escorted into the "church" for the "almost holy" union of the two young lovers: Joni Gottlieb, a Jewish sports enthusiast, and Gina Spaulding, the independent daughter of a rigid military family. After dinner, the wedding cake and champagne are served, and the real fun begins. Guests participate in a not-so-traditional bouquet toss, learn to line dance, dance the Hora, and have many surprises. The three-ring circus ends as everyone participates in a sing-along finale.
