= Joy Swift =

British businesswoman

Joy Swift MBE
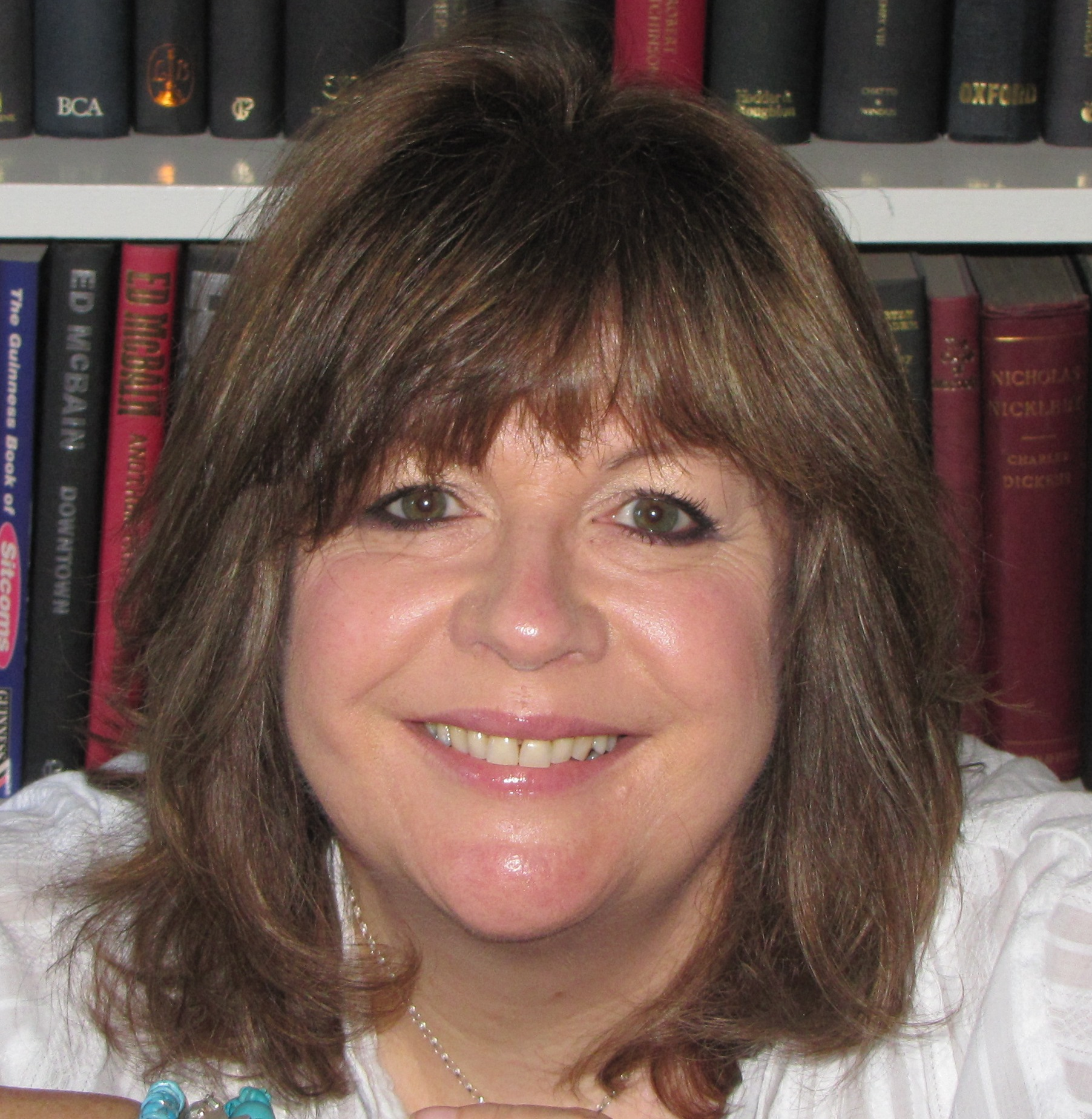
- Born: Joy Angela Swift; 2 October 1956 (age 69); Blundellsands, Liverpool
- Education: Merchant Taylors' Girls' School
- Occupations: Businesswoman, writer and events organiser
- Years active: 1981–present
- Website: Joy Swift

Joy Angela Swift MBE (born 2 October 1956) is a businesswoman, writer and events organiser from Liverpool, who is best known as the inventor of the murder mystery weekend.

== Early life and family background ==
Swift was born in Blundellsands, Liverpool, to Norman and Thelma (née Lake), Swift is the youngest of three children. Her father Norman was the fourth generation to run the family owned timber merchants business.

== Career ==
Swift went to college to study graphic design but she left to take up full-time employment at the Liverpool Echo. Swift left three years later to join a small chain of hotels.

== Murder mystery weekend ==
In 1981, she came up with the idea of an interactive murder mystery that would allow hotel guests to become sleuths. Swift hired local actors to play the main characters and on 30 October 1981, she staged her first murder mystery weekend. In 1983, Swift staged her first murder mystery weekend outside of the UK in New York.

In 1989, Michael Aspel hosted a televised interactive murder mystery set at a wedding called Murder Weekend, devised and written by Swift, which invited viewers to solve a whodunnit to win a prize. The five episodes were entitled Dream Of Monks A-Coughing: A Funeral's In The Offing, Dream Of Gulls A-Screeching: Heed The Parson's Preaching, Dream Of Toms A-Snarling: A Quarrel With Your Darling, Dream Of Vipers Hissing: Your Favourite Dog's Gone Missing and Dream Of Yaks A-Mooing: Sign Of Your Undoing and were broadcast over three nights on ITV from August 18 to 20. The cast included and David Delve, Eric Allen, John Hudson and Jason Salkey.

In April 2007, Swift published her first paperback, The Joy Of Murder. The book included a biography of Swift, behind-the-scenes anecdotes and a solvable whodunnit. In October the same year, Swift travelled to Egypt to stage four week-long murder mystery cruises billed as Death On The Nile.

In November 2007 as part of Liverpool's 800th birthday celebrations, Swift created a solvable whodunnit for her local newspaper entitled The Great Echo Murder Mystery. She wrote an historical plot that was printed each day as a two-page police evidence board of clues. Readers submitted their solutions in writing and 10 winners attended the denouement, where the murderer was revealed.

In May 2011, Litmus Films produced a six-minute segment for Japan's national broadcaster NHK about Swift and her murder mystery weekends. Two years later, Swift wrote and co-directed a 90-minute interactive murder mystery for NHK, which screened on the channel over three nights. Viewers attempted to solve a whodunnit at the same time as three studio experts.

In 2020 during the global Covid-19 pandemic, Swift created a unique realistic online whodunnit for sleuths around the world, Murder Mystery Investigation. The first online game was launched, titled Cold Case #1 - Lockdown. In 2021 the second online game was released, titled Cold Case #2 - Family Ties.

== Awards and nominations ==
In the 2001 New Year Honours, Swift was appointed a member of the Member of the British Empire (MBE) for services to tourism as the inventor of the murder mystery weekend. She collected her MBE from Prince Charles at an investiture on 2 May 2002.

In 2006, Swift collected a Prestige Award for Excellence in Tourism and Leisure Services at a ceremony hosted by Sefton Chamber of Commerce.

At the inaugural Independent Travel Awards, announced on 25 September 2015, Swift was nominated for the Reader’s Choice Award with David Attenborough, Patrick Leigh Fermor and Michael Palin.

In 2016, Murder Weekends were nominated for Best Special Interest Holiday Company in the Daily Mirror Travel Awards.

In 2021 Joy Swift's Original Murder Mystery Investigations Cold Case #1 - Lockdown was a finalist and Cold Case #2 - Family Ties won Gold at the EscapeTheRoomers Player Choice Awards for Online Games
