= Dinner theater =

Theatrical genre

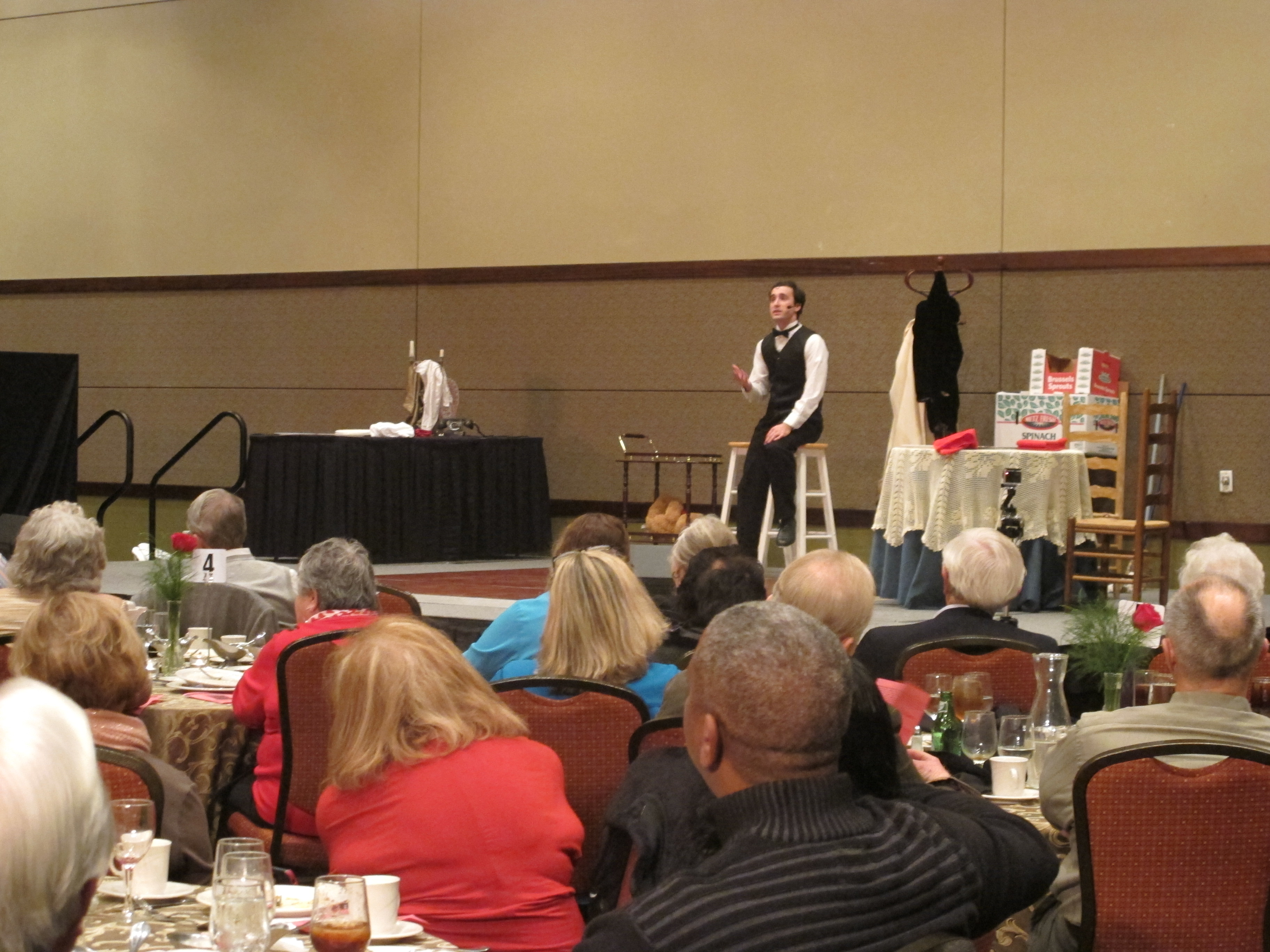
Audience watching a dinner theater show by the Actors' Theatre of South Carolina

Dinner theater (sometimes called dinner and a show) is a form of entertainment that combines a restaurant meal with a staged play or musical. In the case of a theatrical performance, sometimes the play is incidental entertainment, secondary to the meal. In the style of a night club, the play may be the main feature of the evening, with dinner less important or optional. "Dinner and a show" can also refer to a restaurant meal in combination with live concert music, where patrons listen to a performance during a break in the meal.

Dinner theater requires the management of three distinct entities: a live theater, a restaurant and, usually, a bar.

== History ==
The Madrigal dinners in the Renaissance were early forms of dinner theater. Some early dinner theaters, known as "theatre restaurants", served dinner in one room and staged the play in another.

=== Notable venues in the United States ===
==== NarroWay Productions ====
NarroWay Productions is a non-profit Christian Dinner Theatre, founded by Yvonne Clark and Rebecca Martin in September 1996, located in Fort Mill, South Carolina. The theater started out in the "King's Arena" amphitheater. After 8 years of performing at the King's Arena amphitheater, their lease had ended and they were forced to switch locations. In 2005 an old gambling warehouse, on Carowinds Blvd, went for sale. after some negotiation, the owner of the warehouse agreed to sell the property to NarroWay Productions under value. Since then they have written 5+ new shows, they created 3 shops across the parking lot, including a cafe, which has since been closed, a gift shop, and an ice cream shop. They have even hosted a golf tournament.

==== Barksdale Theatre ====
Barksdale Theatre in Richmond, Virginia, founded in 1953 by David and Nancy Kilgore at the Hanover Tavern, was the first formal dinner theater in the United States. After the theatre was established, an adjoining room in the theatre was changed to accommodate a buffet dinner for groups attending the performance, eventually becoming available to all patrons.

==== Drury Lane Theatres ====
Tony DeSantis opened the Martinique Restaurant in Evergreen Park, Illinois and began producing plays in 1949 in a tent adjacent to the restaurant to attract customers. The enterprise was successful, prompting him to build his first theater, Drury Lane Evergreen Park in 1958. It was the first of six dinner theaters he started and a local entertainment fixture for 45 years before closing in 2003. Drury Lane North began operations in 1976 and was sold to the Marriott Lincolnshire Resort, becoming the Marriott Theatre. Drury Lane Oak Brook Terrace opened in 1984. The facility uses local performers and shows are limited to musicals.

==== Meadowbrook Theatre Restaurant ====
Cedar Grove, New Jersey, was the location of the Meadowbrook Theatre Restaurant, which opened in 1960 with 700+ seats of table service. It closed after 13 years, in part due to nearby competition from Broadway and Actors' Equity Association (Equity) requirements that the facility follow the rules that applied to Broadway theatres, including pay scales and other restrictions.

==== Candlelight Theatre Restaurant ====
The first facility where dinner and the show were together in one room was the Candlelight Theatre Restaurant in Washington, D.C. Bill Pullinsi was a theater student in 1959 who conceived and implemented the entertainment concept at the Presidential Arms Hotel during summer breaks with partner Tony D'angelo. The venture was successful but it was unable to convert to a year-round operation due to the hotel's convention business. Pullinsi returned to his Chicago home and with D'Angelo, opened the Candlelight Dinner Playhouse, first in a building owned by his grandfather, then in a new facility with seating for 550. The Candlelight introduced several innovations which drew on D'Angelo's skill as an electrical engineer, including the hydraulic stage, lighting equipment located in the mezzanine, and stage wagons on wheels.

==== Barn Dinner Theatres ====
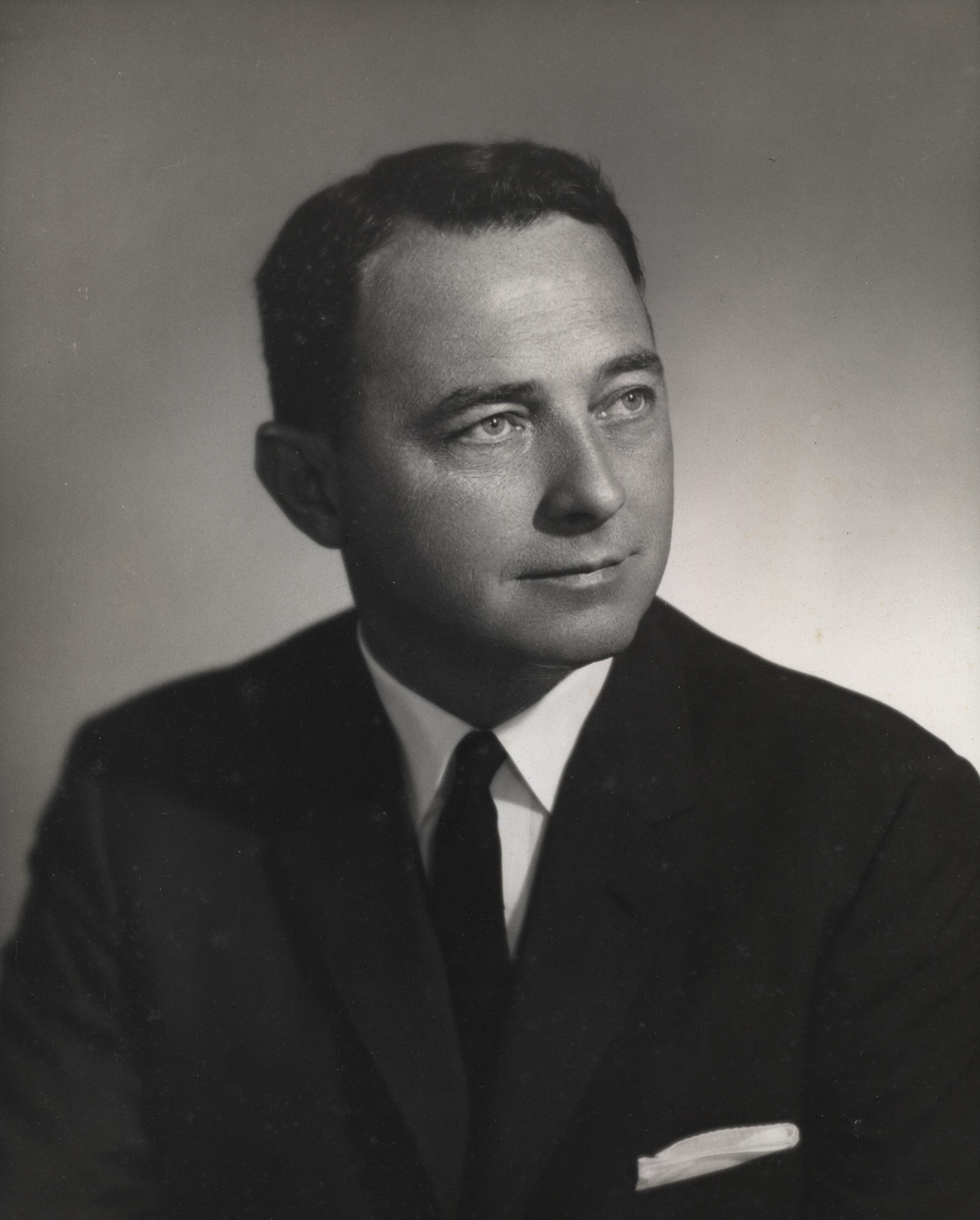
Howard Wolfe

Howard Douglass Wolfe, an entrepreneur from Roanoke, Virginia, created the Barn Dinner Theatre franchise and has been called the "Father of Dinner Theater". He began the franchise in 1961 with Conley Jones. The chain included 27 theaters in New York, Virginia, North Carolina, Tennessee, Texas, Louisiana, and Georgia. Each franchise featured Wolfe's architectural barn designs, farm-themed decorations that included a plow and other tools, and a stage elevator that Wolfe called the "Magic Stage". At the end of an act or scene, the stage would disappear into the ceiling, then reappear set for the next scene. The whole process took less than a minute. During the franchise phase of The Barn, all the productions were staged at a studio in New York City, then sent out to the individual theaters. At the break-up of the franchise, the production facilities were moved to Nashville. In its early days, the performance's cast also served as the waiters and waitresses. Actors were selected and cast in New York and resided in living quarters above the theater for the duration of the productions. Mickey Rooney and many other well-known performers acted in roles at The Barn.

The Barn in Greensboro, North Carolina, was founded in 1964 and is the oldest continuously running dinner theater in America and the last of the original Barn Dinner Theatres.

==== Chaffin's Barn ====
Chaffin's Barn in Nashville, Tennessee, opened in 1967, as Nashville's first professional theater. Known as a place where many actors landed their first paid professional "gigs", The Barn was forced to close in October 2020, after 50 years of business due to the COVID-19 pandemic.

==== Alhambra Dinner Theatre ====
The Alhambra Dinner Theatre in Jacksonville, Florida was opened in 1967 by Leon Simon. It was purchased in 1985 by Tod Booth, who left Chicago's Drury Lane Theatres. The Alhambra is the oldest dinner theater still open. The facility uses a thrust stage to provide all 400 seats with an unobstructed view.

==== Chanhassen Dinner Theatres ====
Chanhassen Dinner Theatres in the Minneapolis-Saint Paul area were founded in 1968.

Chanhassen claims to be the largest professional dinner theater in the U.S. The Main Stage seats 577, the Fireside Theatre contains 230 seats for non-dining patrons, and the Playhouse Theatre has tables for 126. The Main Stage production cast are members of Actors Equity.

Herb Bloomberg, who designed and built the expanded Old Log Theatre near Lake Minnetonka, subsequently constructed and operated the Chanhassen Dinner Theatres. The Old Log Theatre has an attached dining room. Revenue from food sales is necessary for financial success, but is not a dinner theater.

==== Carousel Dinner Theatre ====
The Carousel Dinner Theatre opened in 1973 and moved to Akron, Ohio in 1988 to what had been a Las Vegas-style nightclub. With 1200 seats, it was the largest dinner theater in the United States until it closed in 2009. Some believe the theater was a victim of the late 2000s US economic crisis, however it was more likely the change in ownership and poor decisions on their part that triggered events leading to the theatre closing.

==== Beef & Boards Dinner Theatre ====
Beef & Boards Dinner Theatre in Indianapolis, Indiana, opened in 1973 and was one of a chain of dinner theatres founded by J. Scott Talbott. It has a 450-seat house and features Broadway shows and concerts preceded by a buffet dinner. It is a professional Equity theatre.

==== Riddlesbrood Touring Theater ====
The Riddlesbrood Touring Theater Company stages dinner theater, murder mystery shows, and comedy shows. Based in Stratford, New Jersey, some of their shows have been performed entirely in made-up languages and have incorporated ideas from the New Thought movement.

==== Westchester Broadway Theatre ====
Westchester Broadway Theatre in Elmsford, NY. The theatre continuously presents Broadway Musical Revivals and many special events and concerts including tribute bands, comedy shows, rock bands, dance shows, magic shows, and more. It is the longest running year-round professional theatre in the State of New York. The Theatre originally opened as An Evening Dinner Theatre on July 9, 1974. In 1991, the theatre moved to a larger performance space with state-of-the-art technology, hydraulic lifts, increased seating capacity, and many other features. The theatre was also given the new name, "Westchester Broadway Theatre".

The Derby Dinner Playhouse

The Derby Dinner Playhouse in Clarksville, Indiana opened in 1974, and has operated continuously. They utilized a "magic stage" similar to those used by the Barn Dinner Theatre. An orchestra, if utilized, plays in the "attic", out of sight.

== Popularity and decline ==
Dinner theaters as regional entertainments for local audiences in the US peaked in the 1970s. Alhambra Dinner Theatre owner Tod Booth stated that in 1976, there were 147 professional dinner theaters in operation nationwide. The dinner theaters that used former movie actors to star in the productions were particularly successful. Van Johnson, Lana Turner, Don Ameche, Eve Arden, Mickey Rooney, June Allyson, Shelley Winters, Dorothy Lamour, Tab Hunter, Betty Grable, Sandra Dee, Mamie Van Doren, Joan Blondell, Debbie Reynolds, Cyd Charisse, Kathryn Grayson, Betty Hutton, Jane Withers, Martha Raye, Elke Sommer, Donald O'Connor, Roddy McDowall, Jane Russell, Cesar Romero, and Ann Miller are just a few Hollywood stars who were featured in dinner theatre. Actors from well remembered television series, such as Betty White, Ann B. Davis, Vivian Vance, Bob Denver, Jo Anne Worley, Bernie Kopell, Dawn Wells, Ken Berry, Gavin MacLeod, Nancy Kulp, Frank Sutton, and Bob Crane were also used as headliners. Burt Reynolds owned a dinner theater in Jupiter, Florida from 1979 to 1997, as did actor Earl Holliman, who owned the Fiesta Dinner Playhouse in San Antonio, Texas.

The boom ended in the mid-1980s, and many of the theaters closed. Film and television stars ceased working in dinner theater. Booth commented: "They could make more in a day doing a commercial than they could make during the entire run of dinner theater show, and they didn't have to travel. Plus, a lot of the stars just started dying off. It was a fine gig for a while." He said that, in 1999, you could count the number of surviving professional dinner theaters on two hands. There was a stigma attached to dinner theater and audiences got tired of such shows like Last of the Red Hot Lovers and Arsenic and Old Lace.

=== Resurgence ===
After 2000, new dinner theaters began opening. Chicago's original Drury Lane Water Tower Place was founded in 1976, but closed in 1983. A new $7 million version opened in 2004. The Desert Star Theater in Murray, Utah opened a dinner theater in 2004 and the Gathering Dinner Theatre in Jacksonville opened in early 2009. At the end of 2006, the National Dinner Theatre Association had 32 members, compared to 9 in 1999.

The COVID-19 pandemic of 2020 led to a resurgence of the form as a way of giving employment back to musicians and entertainment back to patrons in an industry severely affected by closures.

== Different types ==
=== Union vs. non-union ===
In the United States, union theatres are known as equity theatres, where performers are members of the Actors' Equity Association, the union that represents professional stage actors and stage managers. Union shows have a higher cost because equity contracts typically require the theater to pay for lodging, a minimum salary, insurance and pension payments, among other work rules regarding auditions and hiring.

The reduction in professional dinner theaters from 147 in 1976 to 9 in 1999 was partly because union theaters changed to non-union to reduce expenses. Although actors are often housed at non-union theatres, salary for non-union actors may be significantly lower than at Equity theaters.

=== Commercial vs. non-profit ===
Tony DeSantis commented that theater operations break even at best, while the restaurant and especially the bar, are more likely to be profitable. While many theaters operate as not-for-profit organizations in order to take advantage of grants and funding from government agencies or private foundations, most dinner theaters are commercial businesses. Commercial dinner theatres often have shows six or seven nights a week and matinees. They also have short breaks between shows, usually less than a week.

An example of a non-profit theater is the Starlight Dinner Theatre in Lansing, Michigan, where the dinner is catered. The shows are staged at a school cafetorium and the season includes only four productions with four performances per production (on Friday and Saturday nights).

Some non-profits use amateur actors or casts where the leading role may be a professional with the rest of the cast composed of amateurs.

== Variations ==
=== Tourist ===
Vacation American destinations such as Las Vegas, Destin, Florida, Branson, Missouri, Pigeon Forge, Tennessee, Anaheim, and Los Angeles, California, saw the emergence of specialty dinner theaters, where the show stays the same for an extended run because the vast majority of their customers are tourists, not local residents. The most popular vacation destination in the United States, Orlando, Florida, had more than a dozen dinner theaters operating in 1999; through the 1990s, sixteen opened and closed there.

=== Murder mystery ===
Murder mystery games are interactive dinner theater events that have become popular on their own. The productions may be public where anyone can attend for the price of admission, or private where a company, social group or organization sponsors an event for its members. While utilizing the "dinner and a show" concept, the murder mystery show generally targets a smaller audience than typical dinner theater. Public performances usually feature professional actors while private showings may offer "roles" to the guests who participate in the production as either characters or detectives.

=== Others ===
The Wedding Comedy is similar to Murder Mystery as the staging requirements are minimal and the audience has interaction with the actors while they perform. Joey and Maria's Comedy Italian Wedding was written by Darlyne Franklin in 1992 and the franchise rights were sold in 2001. Other examples include Tony n' Tina's Wedding and a gay version, Joni and Gina's Wedding.

Riverboat Dinner Cruises combine a showboat with a meal. They are limited to locations on a navigable body of water, such as the Showboat Branson Belle or the Goldenrod Showboat.

Madrigal dinners a.k.a. Madrigal Feasts are seasonal, typically held during the Christmas season. They are often staged by educational or religious entities for fundraising and include food, singing, poetry, humor, costumes, and a play from the Middle Ages, ranging from medieval to the Renaissance periods.

Medieval Times Dinner and Tournament is a chain of dinner theaters with shows featuring horses and jousting.

== See also ==
- Cabaret
- List of dinner theaters

== Sources ==
- Lynk, William M. Dinner Theatre-A Survey and Directory, Greenwood Publishing (1993) ISBN 0-313-28442-3
- McAuley, Muriel: Going On...Barksdale Theatre, The First Thirty-One Years, Taylor Publishing, 1984. ISBN 0-9613905-0-6
- Miller, Michael (2008). The complete idiot's guide to music history. Indianapolis, Indiana: Alpha. ISBN 978-1592577514. OCLC 180755051.
