= Media portrayals of bisexuality =

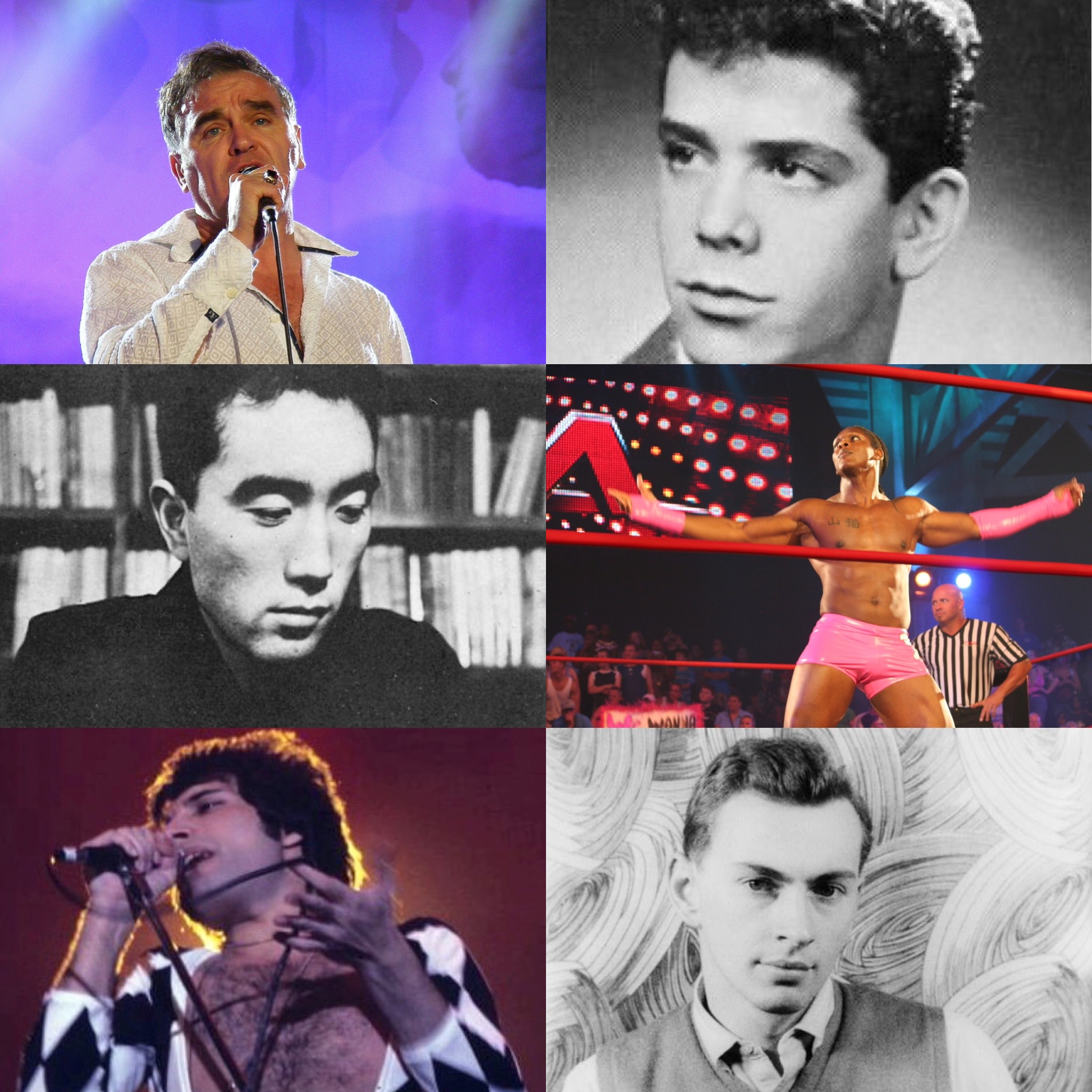
Some notable bisexual men: Morrissey, Lou Reed, Yukio Mishima, Orlando Jordan, Freddie Mercury, and Gore Vidal.

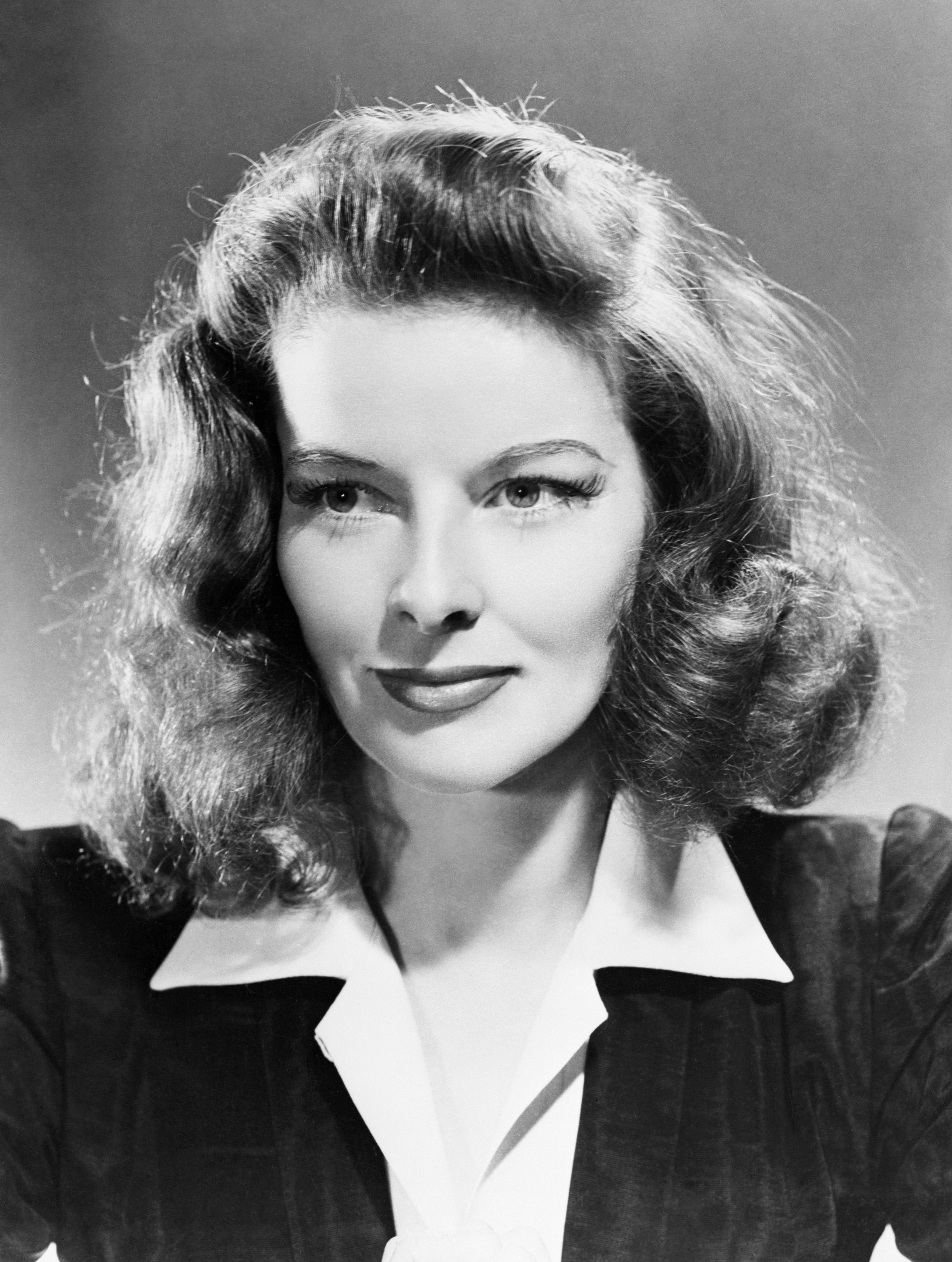
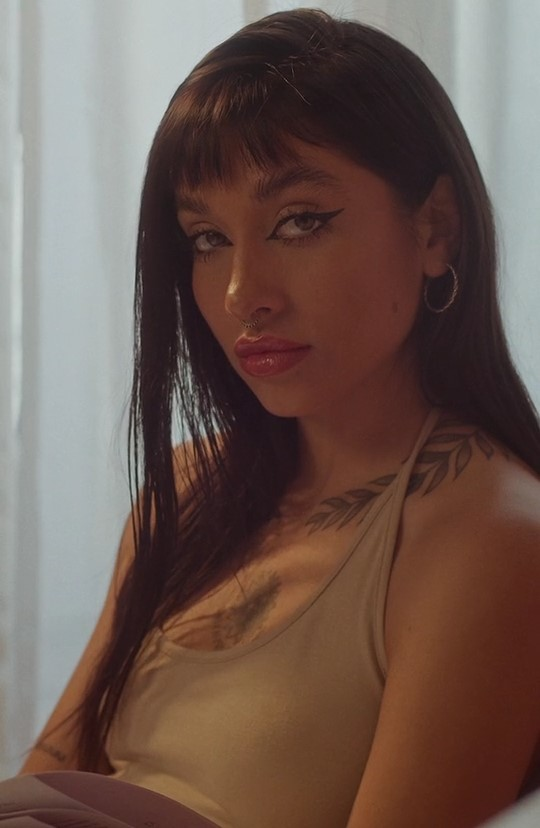
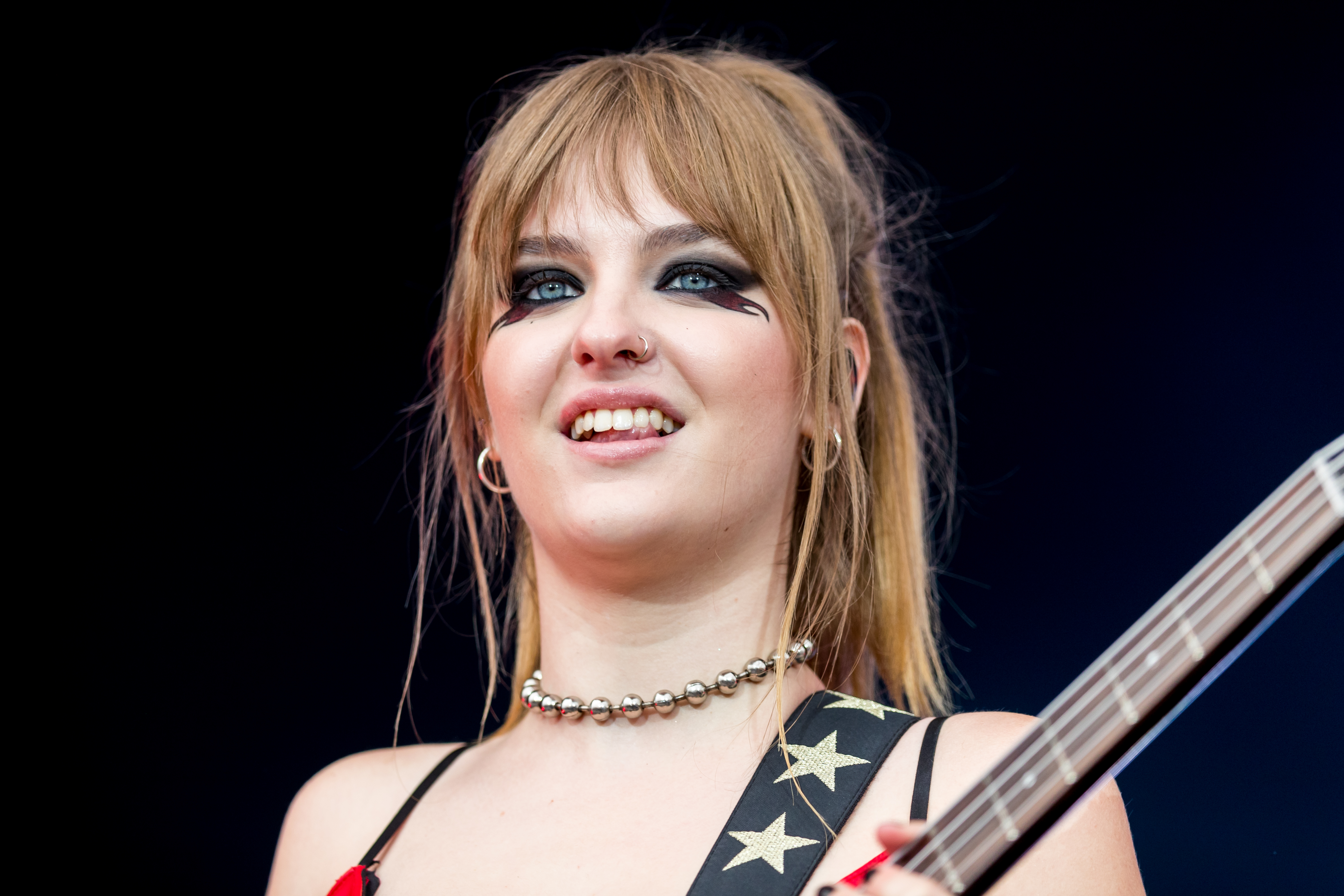
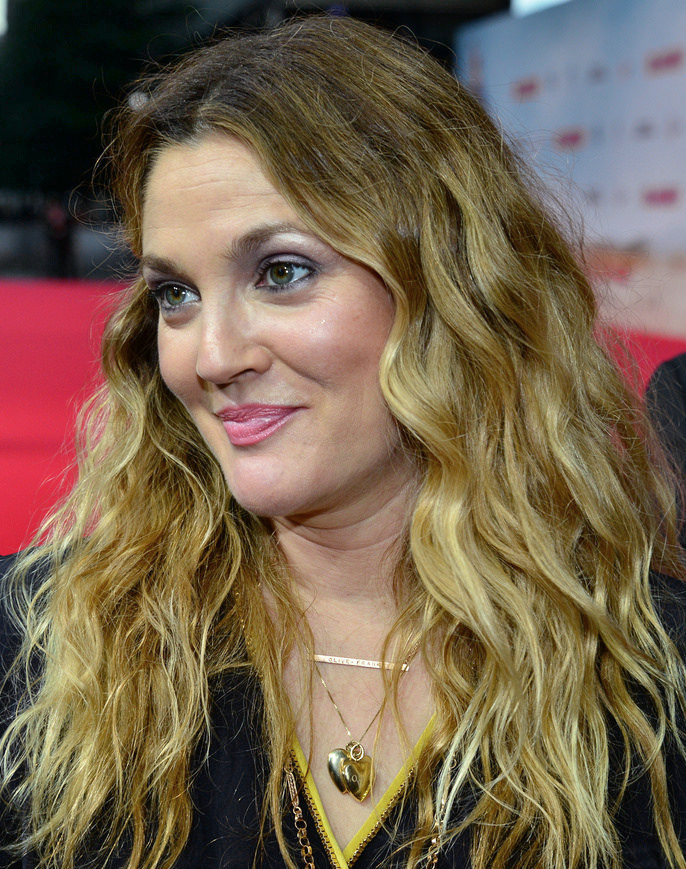
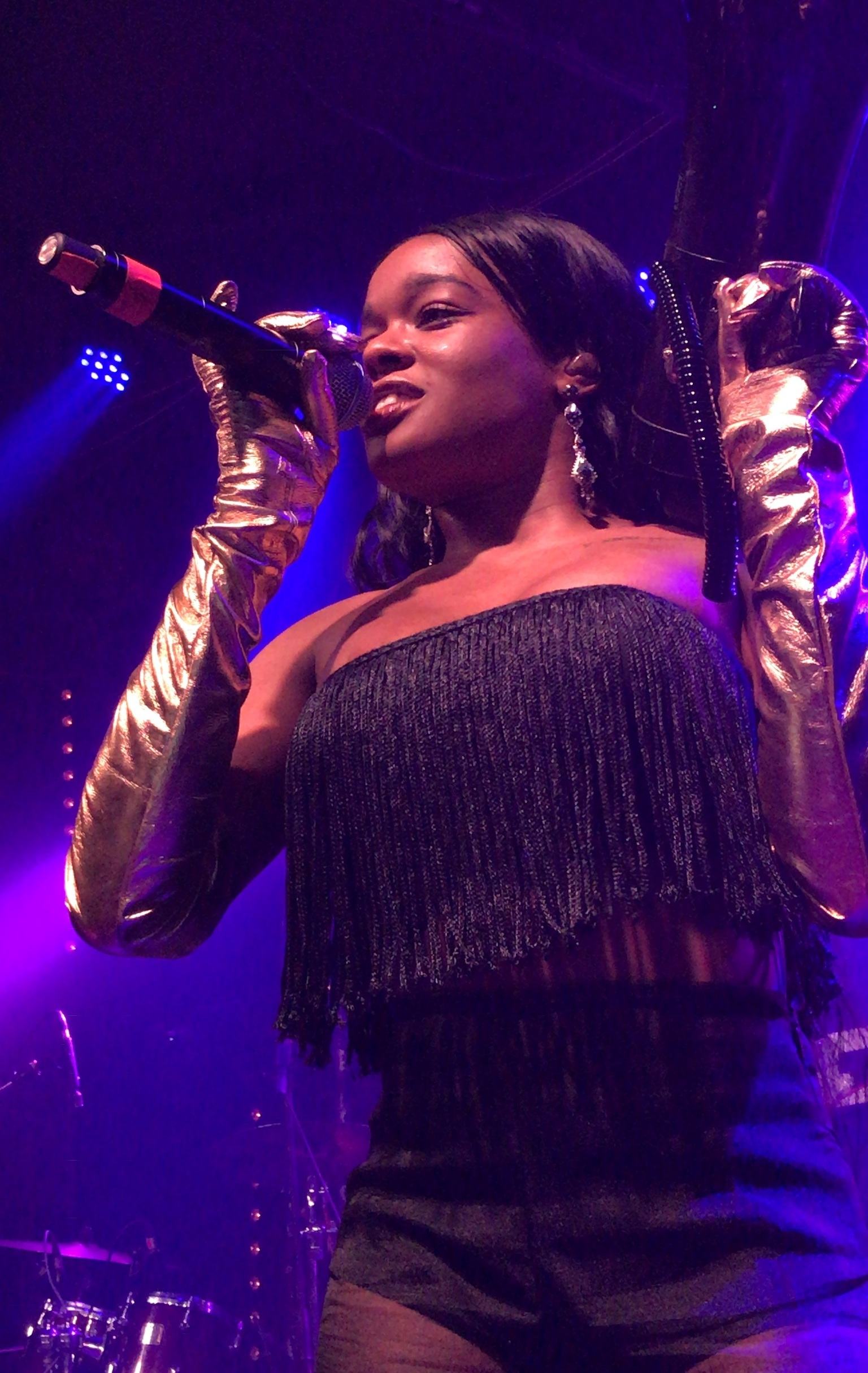
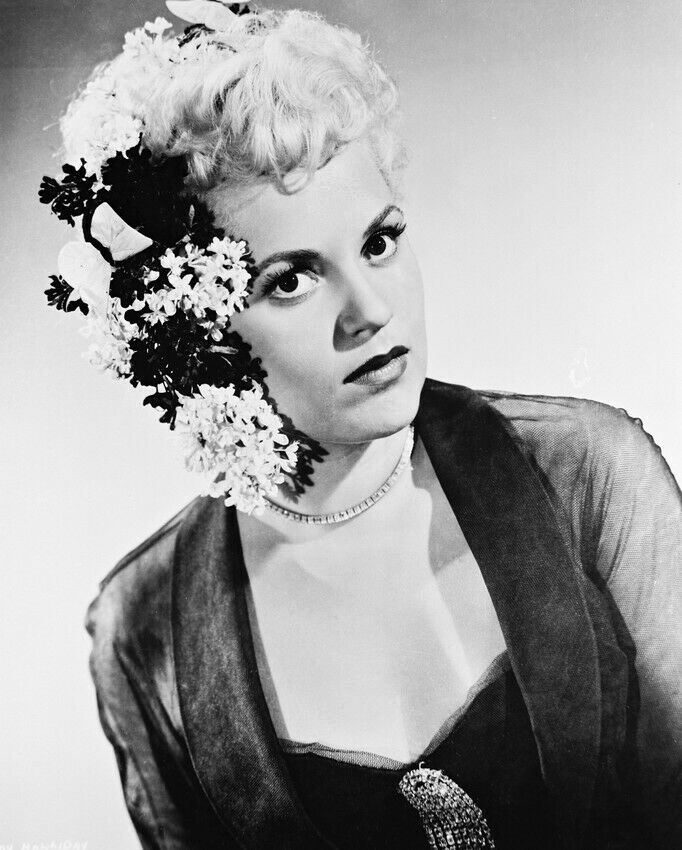
Some notable bisexual women: Katharine Hepburn, María Becerra, Victoria De Angelis, Drew Barrymore, Azealia Banks, and Judy Holliday
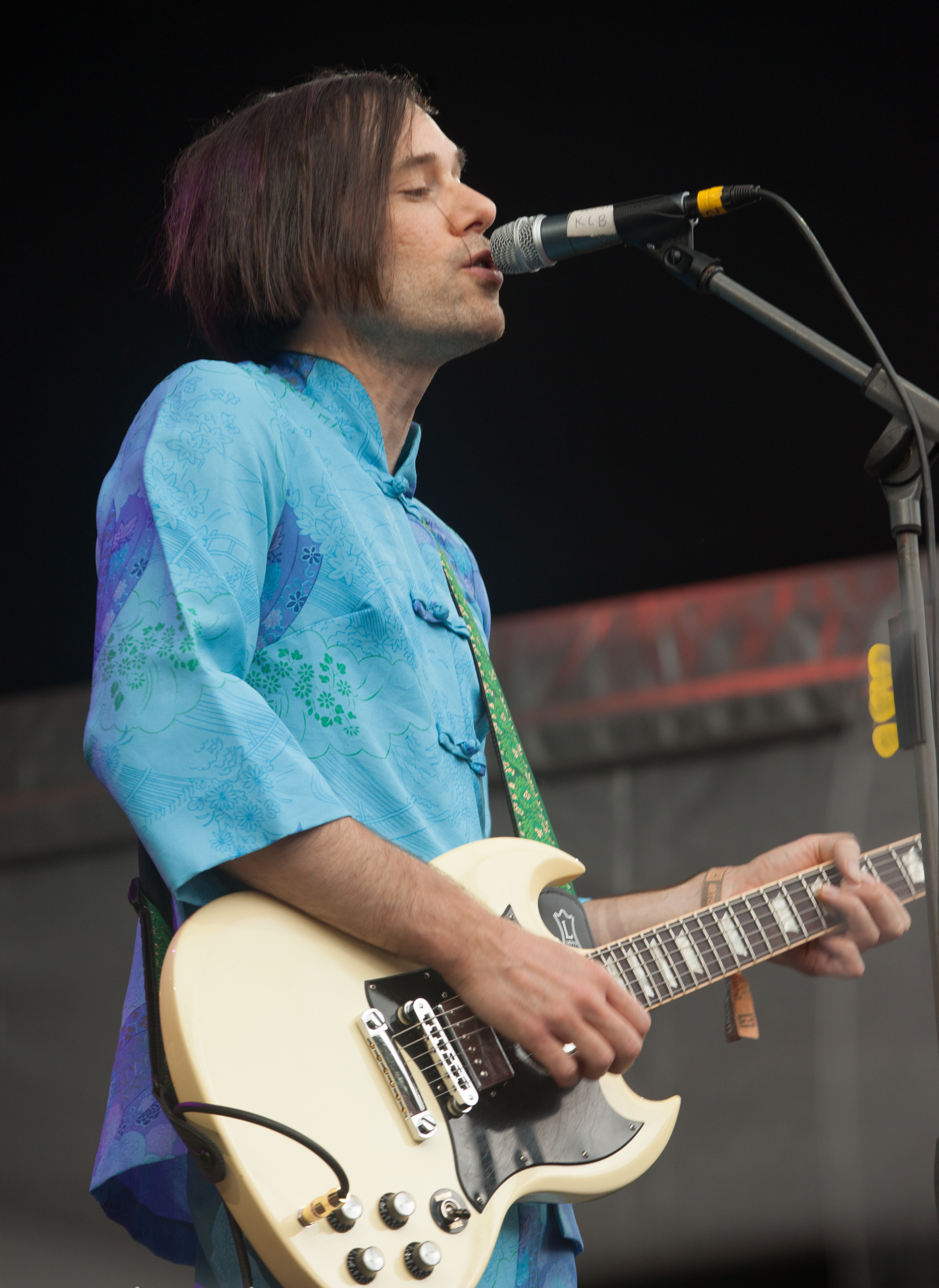
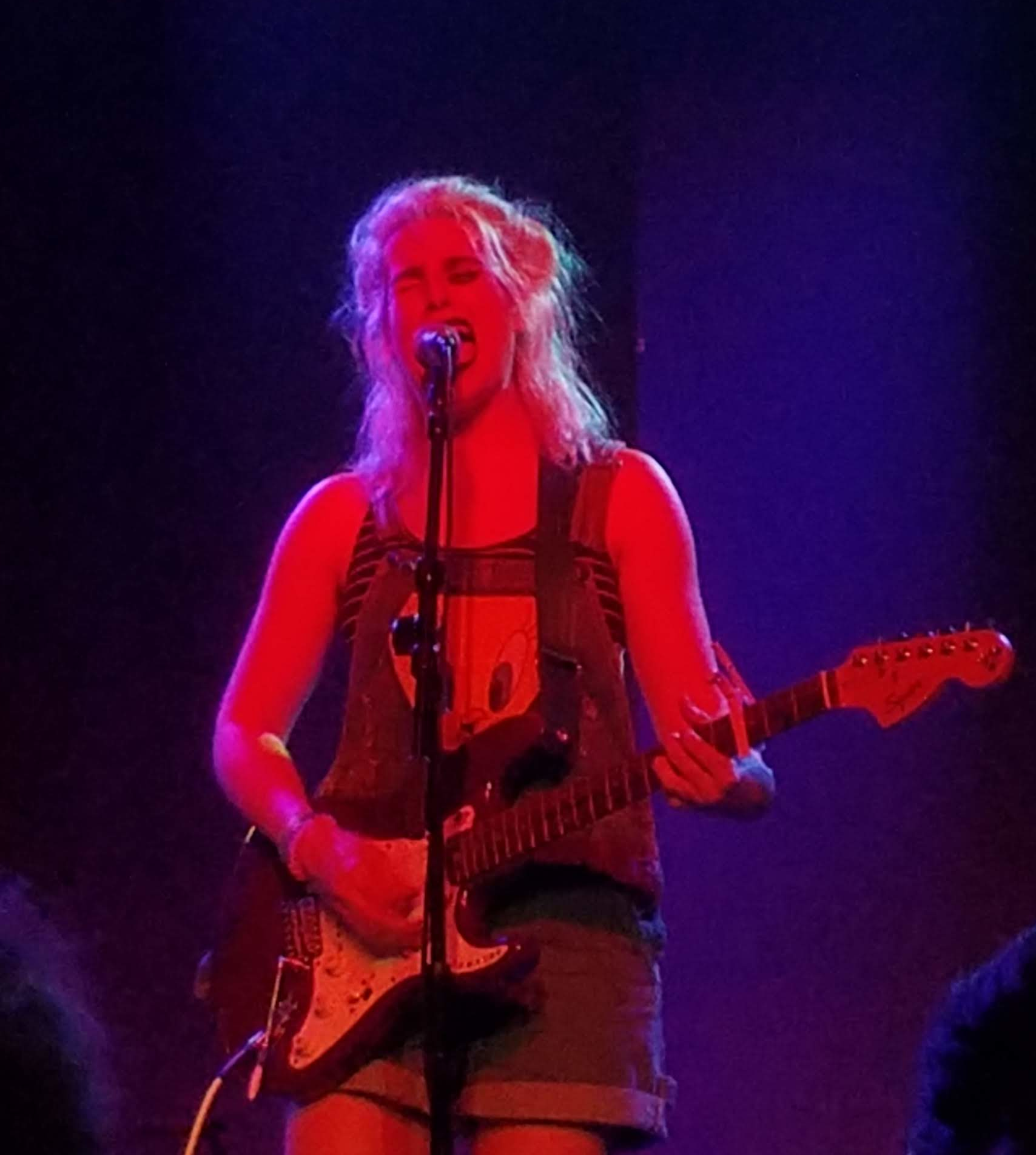
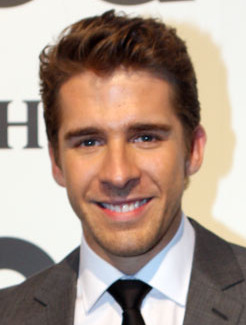
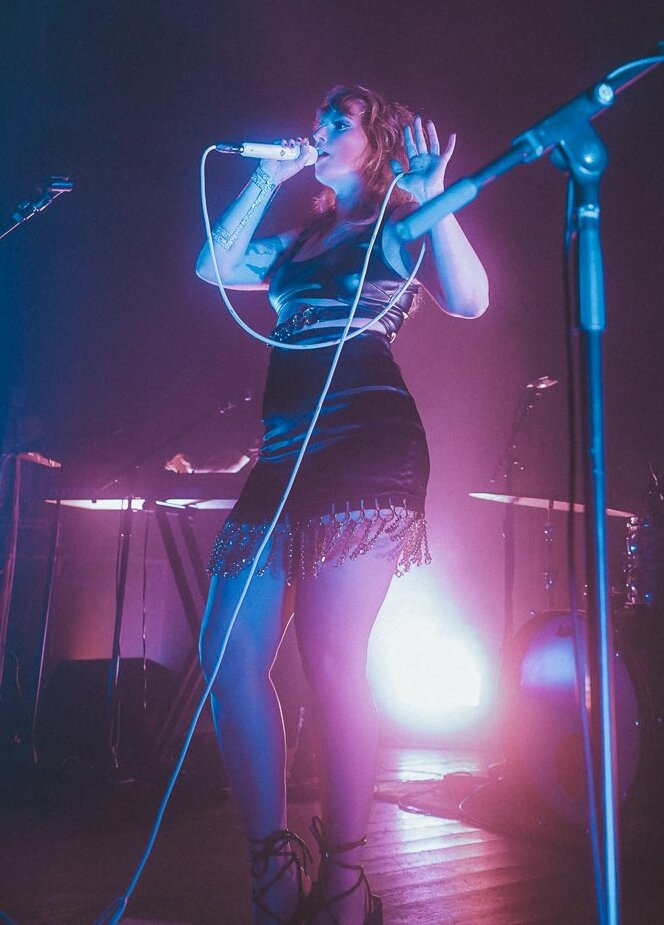
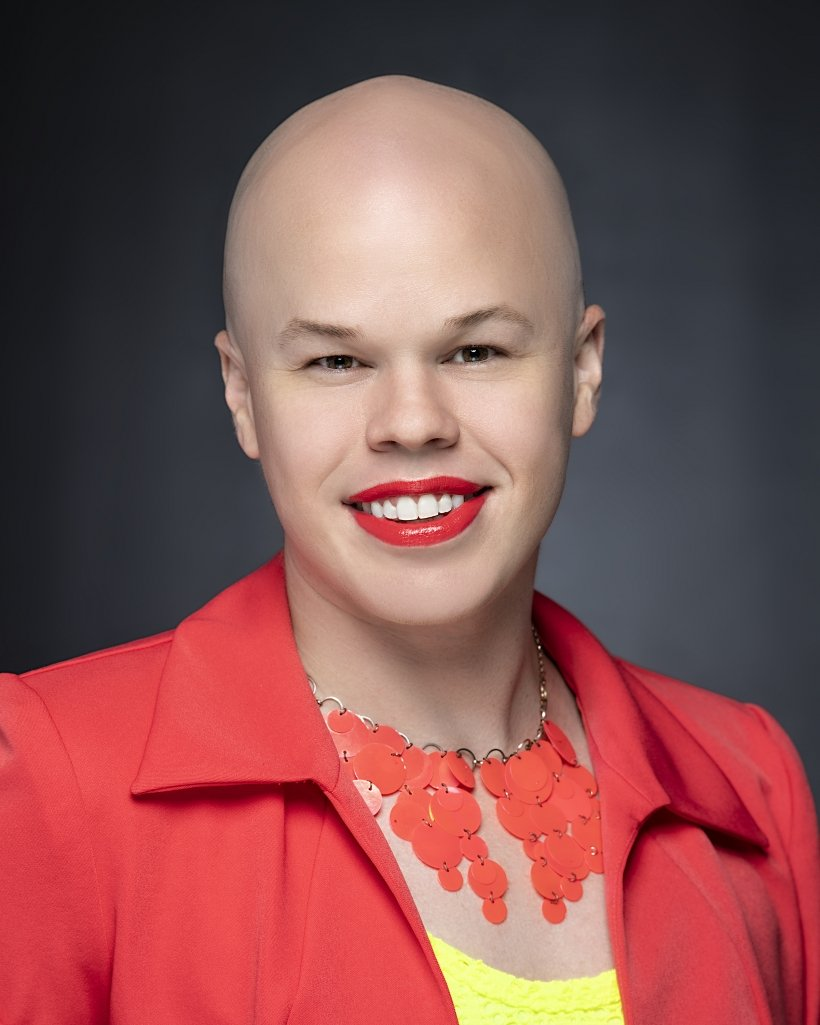
Some notable bisexual non-binary people: Kevin Barnes, Sir Babygirl, Mae Martin, Hugh Sheridan, Emily Blue, and Sam Brinton

The portrayals of bisexuality in the media reflect societal attitudes towards bisexuality in the existing media portrayals. Throughout history, numerous bisexual characters have appeared in television series, including cartoons, anime, video games and web series, along with literature, comics, radio, and other mediums.

Bisexuality is a sexual orientation that refers to the romantic or sexual attraction towards people of more than one gender. Bisexual characters have been featured in animation and anime for years. Despite this representation, "not all queer presentation" is created equal as one scholar noted, with representation of bisexual and transgender characters lagging behind lesbians and gay men in some respects, with this representation important in the U.S. political climate while GLAAD called for Hollywood to produce more films with LGBTQ characters.

== Film ==
In a 2002 report analyzing bisexuality in various mediums, specifically movies, television, and music, GLAAD criticized the track record of the movie industry in the United States, when it came to representation, and inclusion, of bisexuality, stating that often bisexual content is either "removed from novels that films are based on," removed from original screenplays when filming begins, or is taken out on the cutting room floor. This report praised the films Flirting With Disaster (1996), My Own Private Idaho (1991), The Color Purple (1985), French Twist (1995), Rocky Horror Picture Show (1975), and Henry & June (1990) for being "fair, accurate and inclusive" when it came to bisexual characters. However, the film Basic Instinct (1992) was described as "one of the worst examples of biphobia ever put on a screen" while Inside Daisy Clover (1965) and Spartacus (1960) were criticized for their removal of scenes with "bisexual content." Basic Instinct also received controversy from the bisexual community for portraying a bisexual as a psychopathic killer.

In 2005, the site Out Films, listed 10 Hollywood films which they felt had the best bisexual representation. Apart from My Own Private Idaho, which GLAAD had listed in their report, the site listed nine other films: Kissing Jessica Stein (2001), De-Lovely (2004), Water Drops on Burning Rocks (2004), Sunday, Bloody Sunday (1971), Midnight Cowboy (1969), Kinsey (2004), Cabaret (1972), Y Tu Mama Tambien (2001), and Midnight Express (1978).

In 2018, the British Film Institute argued that bisexuals are often not explored in cinema, with the worse examples of films being "downright squeamish about their characters' bisexuality." They noted this was the case in films such as Alexander (2004), Caligula (1978), and Skyfall (2012), and added that bisexual women are "even less visible in Hollywood films," apart from Young Man with a Horn (1950). As such, BFI criticized portrayals in films like The Fox (1967) and Gia (1998). The Institute further notes films, including those not bisexual "in the conventional sense," where characters enjoy "sex with men and women," apart from those noted by GLAAD and Out Films: Sex in Chains (1928), Les Biches (1968), Theorem (1968), Score (1974), The Comedian (2012), and Appropriate Behavior (2014). The same year, Ariel Sobel, in an article in The Advocate, praised Rooney Mara in The Girl With the Dragon Tattoo (2011) for portraying "the ultimate queer superhero" and called her character, Lisbeth Salander, "a testament to the brilliance of bisexual women." Sobel also pointed to Tully (2018) as a film about "a woman who happens to be queer" and argued that it "showcases how LGBTQ people go through all sorts of milestones," then experiencing them.

In February 2020, Pride.com said that while corporations "seem content to live in their heteronormative worlds," sources reported that Sony was creating a live-action movie with Spider-Man as bisexual and having a boyfriend.

In September 2020, Zachary Zane and Adrianna Freedman concluded in an article in Men's Health that it is "not easy to find a movie with bisexual characters," especially not easy to find one "that offers a positive and authentic depiction of bisexuality," saying this is terrible for bisexual people. As such, the article pointed to 16 films which have done a great "or at least reasonably decent" job at depicting bisexuality, most of which had not been highlighted by GLAAD or Out Films: Atomic Blonde (2017), Booksmart (2019), Call Me By Your Name (2017), Imagine Me and You (2005), Brokeback Mountain (2005), Behind the Candelabra (2013), Colette (2018), and Dare (2009). However, one of their selections, Bohemian Rhapsody (2018), was criticized for its portrayal of Mercury's sexuality and use of homophobic tropes. Another selection, Chasing Amy (1997), was praised by The Advocate for its "exploration of sexual politics" and the troubles that bisexual women encounter when taking "on straight partners." The same magazine argued that Frida (2002), one of Zane and Freedman's selections, highlights an "underacknowledged bisexual," Frida Kahlo, and called The Kids Are All Right (2010), also chosen by Zane and Freedman, was "the most accomplished film about queer women created by a queer woman." In 2021, Marya E. Gates of Nerdist restated that clear bisexuality is rare in film and also wrote that several acclaimed bisexual-themed films did not "get it", suggesting there were only few examples of bisexuality in film that are explicit and genuine, naming examples Appropriate Behavior (2014), Moonlight (2016) and Shiva Baby (2020).

In December 2020, Apoorva Nijhara examined bisexuality in Bollywood films, noting those which had positive or negative representation. She noted that Bollywood has not tried to counter stigma against bisexual people, stating that "bisexuality happens to be the least explored topic when it comes to Bollywood," citing Fire (1996), Dedh Ishqiya (2014), and Padmaavat (2018) as examples of bad representation. However, she points to bisexual-positive themes in Honeymoon Travels Pvt. Ltd. (2007) and Margarita with a Straw (2014), calling the latter film the "only movie that has actually shown bisexuality in perfect light."

== Live-action television ==
In 2003, GLAAD concluded that there were have only been "a few bisexual characters on TV." The report cited Steven Carrington in the soap opera, Dynasty (1981–1989) who "had a long term love affair with Luke" but got married, had a child, and later lived with his former lover, Bart, as the first example. The same report also cited C.J. Lamb, played by Amanda Donohoe, in the NBC drama L.A. Law (1986–1994), and Nancy, played by Sandra Bernhard in Roseanne (1988–2018), as bisexual, calling the latter "probably the most recent portrayal of bisexuality." The report concluded that while bisexual characters had been popular in television shows, even raising ratings, "there are no bisexual characters on primetime today," supposing this is the case because networks have "chosen to ignore bisexuality in the plots of their shows."

In 2015, Eliel Cruz, in Slate, praised American Horror Story for its bisexual representation with Ramona Royale falling for The Countess and a man, a trans female bartender of the Blue Parrot Lounge named Liz Taylor who was married to a woman before coming out as transgender but falls in love with a male model, and Will Drake, buyer and new owner of the Hotel Cortez, called himself bisexual in one episode. Cruz called this unique because unlike lesbian and gay characters, "bisexual characters rarely say the word bisexual in media," with GLAAD even counting bisexual characters in their annual reports even though "the majority of characters never using the word bisexual." She said the effect of this is that "bisexuals are severely underrepresented in the culture" and are often badly represented, with Drake's character as an "example of what can happen with television producers and writers get our community right."

In 2018, The Advocate pointed to five TV shows as having positive bisexual representation: The Good Wife (Kalinda Sharma), Game of Thrones (Oberyn Martell), Grey's Anatomy (Callie Torres), House of Cards (Frank Underwood), and How to Get Away with Murder (Annalise Keating).

In 2019, Madison Lennon of Screen Rant explained that while it can be "difficult to find bisexual characters that don't fall prey to offensive stereotypes" and there have been "some great depictions of bisexuality over the years." As such, Lennon listed relatable representations of bisexuality in TV, apart from one mentioned by The Advocate in 2018: Max in Black Sails, Nico Minoru in Runaways, Clarke Griffin in The 100, Rosa Diaz in Brooklyn Nine-Nine, Ilana Wexler in Broad City, Sara Lance in Arrow and Legends of Tomorrow, Magnus Bane in Shadowhunters, Lucifer Morningstar in Lucifer, and Miles Hollingsworth III in Degrassi: The Next Generation.

During the HBO special Home Videos stand-up comedian and director Jerrod Carmichael talked about his sexuality, revealing that he has had relationships with both men and women.

In 2021, Nerdist writer Marya E. Gates wrote that bisexual representation often featured biphobia, but argued that in the preceding years, representation had both increased and improved, highlighting Hannibal, Crazy Ex-Girlfriend, Jane the Virgin, and Schitt's Creek.

== Anime and animated series ==
Isaiah Jones of CBR, posting during BiWeek in September 2019, explained that throughout anime there have many bisexual characters, all with their own "circumstances and stories relating to their sexuality." Jones then listed ten bisexual characters in anime series, ranging from the late 1990s to the present. This list included Honoka Maki in Kiznaiver (2016), Ranka in Ouran High School Host Club (2006), Yukari Sendou in Rosario + Vampire (2008), Suruga Kanbaru in Monogatari (2009-2012), Pitohui in Sword Art Online Alternative Gun Gale Online (2018), Miku Izayoi in Date A Live II (2014), Apollo in Is It Wrong to Try to Pick Up Girls in a Dungeon? (2015–Present), Ertegun in Carole & Tuesday (2019), and Ash Lynx in Banana Fish (2018). However, Megan Peters of Comic Book stated in 2018 that "Pitohui has never acknowledged her sexual preference," meaning that the canon is "wide open" and some argued that Ertegun is a "massive jerk" and is self-serving.

Ryouji Fujioka (also known as Ranka), the father of protagonist Haruhi Fujioka, was praised by Angela Goulene of CBR for being a "groundbreaking" queer parent. Goulene noted that Ranka is a crossdresser who performs as a drag queen, is accepted by his mother, and is shown as a "completely normal parent," who cares about his own daughter. She further says that despite his flaws, he is a "caring, loving father" who speaks fondly of Fujioka's mother, saying the show should be applauded for its "normalcy with which queerness and cross-dressing are approached in the show." Ranka also brings home male lovers, has cross-dressing friends, and asserts he is bisexual.

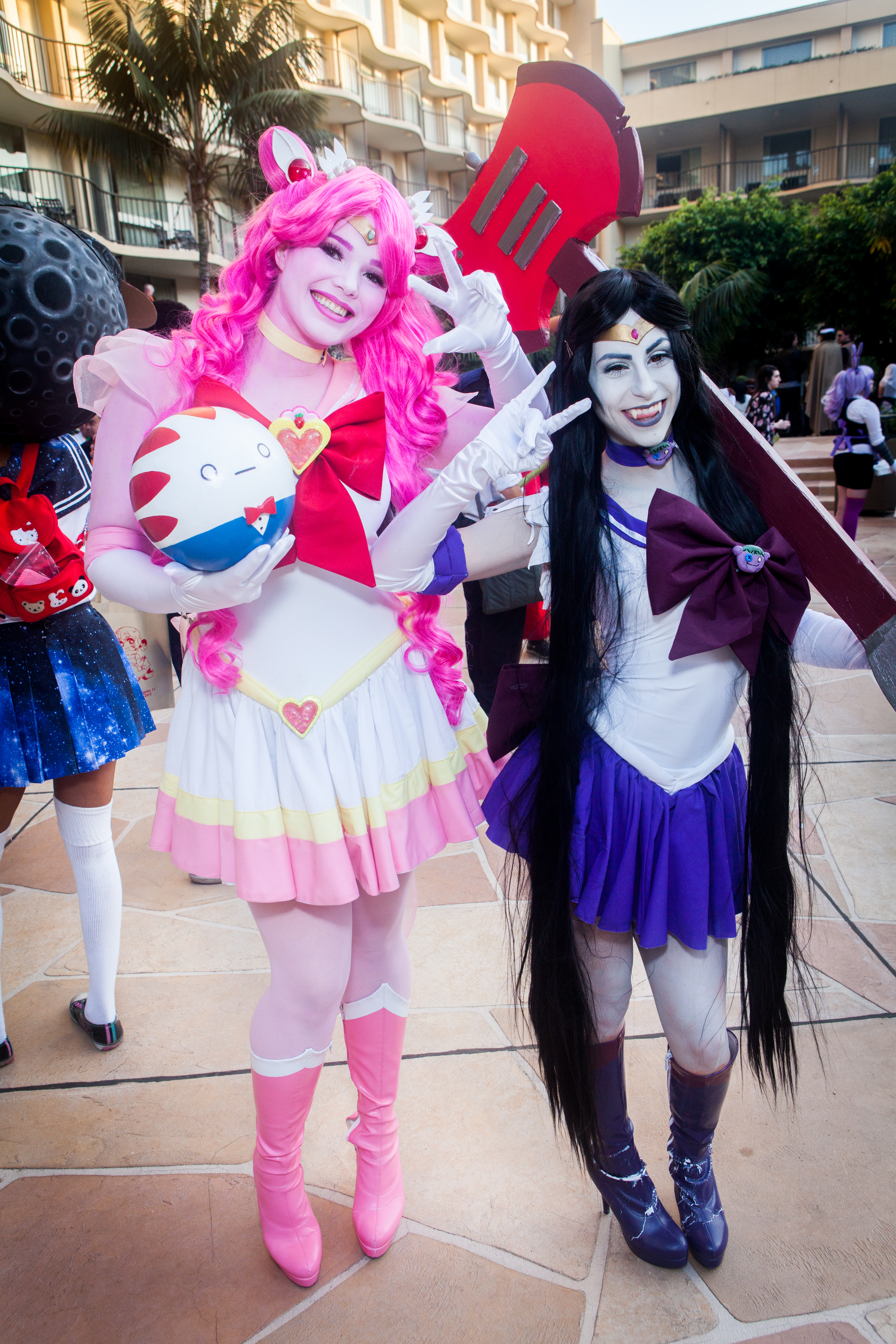
Cosplay at Anime LA 2015 of Marceline and Princess Bubblegum

In 2020, Pride.com talked about several characters in Western animation which they consider "bi icons." This includes Stewie Griffin in Family Guy (1999–Present), Roger Smith in American Dad! (2005–Present), Pam Poove in Archer (2009–Present), Sterling Archer in Archer (2009–Present), Bob in Bob's Burgers (2011–Present), and Rick in Rick and Morty (2013–Present), six characters in popular adult animations. The article also noted Korra in the all-ages animation, The Legend of Korra (2012-2014). The same website described Luz Noceda, the protagonist of The Owl House (2020–2023) as an "awesome" LGBTQ character, noting that she had crushes on male characters and on her friend, Amity, as confirmed by series creator Dana Terrace. In August 2020, Rebecca Sugar confirmed that Marceline the Vampire Queen of Adventure Time (2010-2018) was bisexual, noting that people began to recognize her as bisexual based on "her interactions with other people...[and] her feelings about herself," noting that she had never seen that before and that this was as "revelation" to her. Marceline has a canon relationship with another sapphic woman, Princess Bonnibel "Bonnie" Bubblegum, confirmed in the season finale when both kiss each other, confirming their relationship, which had been hinted at and subtle since the episode "What Was Missing," leading fans to ship these characters. A November 2020 episode of Adventure Time: Distant Lands, "Obsidian," also shines a light on Marcy and Bonnie's relationship.

In the commentary for Stewie Griffin: The Untold Story, the writers describe how they were going to make Stewie discover he was gay but decided to scrap this idea in order to retain Stewie's sexual ambiguity for writing purposes. MacFarlane planned for the series' third season to end with Stewie coming out of the closet after a near-death experience. (Note: MacFarlane told Playboy "We had an episode that went all the way to the script phase in which Stewie does come out. It had to do with the harassment he took from other kids at school. He ends up going back in time to prevent a passage in Leviticus from being written: 'Thou shalt not lie with mankind as with womankind. It is an abomination.' But we decided it's better to keep it vague, which makes more sense because he's a one-year-old. Ultimately, Stewie will be gay or a very unhappy repressed heterosexual.") The show's abrupt cancellation, before later continuing, caused MacFarlane to abort these plans, and the episode "Queer Is Stewie?" was produced, but never shown.

The Nickelodeon animated series The Legend of Korra included two bisexual girls as some of its protagonists: Korra and Asami Sato. The two girls are both initially romantically interested in the same man, but after putting their feelings aside, they manage to become friends. Over the course of the series, their relationship is shown growing and developing, and eventually culminates in the final scene, which indicated the start of a romantic relationship between Korra and Asami. The series was lauded for its unprecedented representation of bisexuality in American children's television, as well as its portrayal of a same-sex relationship between bisexual women. The creators later confirmed the intention of the ending scene was to show Asami and Korra becoming a romantic couple. In the graphic novel The Legend of Korra: Turf Wars, which is the sequel to the animated series, Korra and Asami are in a relationship.

== Video games ==
In June 2017, Sean Murray of The Gamer noted that while many video games in the early 2000s have gay characters, bisexuality didn't appear more in games until the 2010s, when "different romance options" are shown.

This included Jacob Frye in Assassin's Creed Syndicate (2015), Kelly Chambers in Mass Effect 2 (2011), Axton in Borderlands 2 (2012), Trevor Philips in Grand Theft Auto V (2013), Vamp in Metal Gear Solid 2: Sons of Liberty (2001), Javier Garcia in The Walking Dead: A New Frontier (2016), Tatsuya Suou in the Persona 2 duology (1999 and 2000), Kanji Tatsumi in Persona 4 (2008), Rhajat in Fire Emblem Fates (2015), Max Caulfield in Life Is Strange (2015), and Mae in Night in the Woods (2017). Murray also pointed to all the characters in The Elder Scrolls V: Skyrim (2011) and Fallout 4 (2015), the player character in Fable II (2008), and a protagonist in Saints Row: The Third (2011).

Separate from that, in Danganronpa V3: Killing Harmony, Shuichi Saihara is represented to be bisexual. Unique to Danganronpa V3: Killing Harmony, the player can pick a character of their choosing to spend a night with, while playing as Shuichi. They can pick any character regardless of gender, and Shuichi is shown to participate in explicitly romantic and sexual activities with characters of both male and female gender during these events.

Also, in Fallout: New Vegas, the player can use two perks, granting new dialogue options with (and increased damage to) both the same and opposite sex in the game.

== Radio, podcasts, and web series ==
Having been created as a radio program in 1937 and transitioning to television in 1952, Guiding Light is the oldest television series in the world to feature bisexual characters; Olivia Spencer and Natalia Rivera Aitoro. Olivia was introduced in 1999 and Natalia in 2007, with the two women realizing they are bisexual and beginning a relationship in 2008. In 2011, presenter and singer-songwriter Tom Robinson on BBC Radio 4 explored the topic of bisexuality.

There are a few podcasts that have bisexual characters and discuss bisexuality. Bisexuali-tea, hosted by Rin Ryan and Sasha Fernandez, and produced by AWOL at American University, is a bi-weekly podcast, discussing "various topics related to LGBTQ+ life in college." Hello Good Bis!, hosted by Rose and Annie, tries to provide context about "the bisexual experience," talking to people, sharing stories and advice. Mark Bryant in "The Bright Sessions", in an April 2018 episode, uses the term bisexual, showing romantic interest in both men and women, going with a guy to prom while Barry and Darla Abiatti in "The Blood Crow Stories" are bisexual and homoromantic.

As of October 2009, there is a bisexual "webisode" series known as "A Rose By Any Other Name" being released on YouTube that was directed by Independent film director and bisexual rights advocate Kyle Schickner of Fencesitter Films. The plot of the series revolves around a lesbian identified woman who falls in love with a straight man, and goes on to realize she is actually bisexual, and the reaction of both her friends and her boyfriend's friends.

Rager Antinian in Hero Squad: Under the Dragon's Shadow was confirmed to be bi/pan in Episode 6, when he said he was "down for anything" and "very curious" in reference to seducing a male character while the series KTHNXBI follows the daily lives of two bisexual individuals: Ben and Emily. In the actual play series Critical Role (2015), the character Vax'ildan was confirmed by his player Liam O'Brien as bisexual in a Q&A as was the character Allura Vysoren by her creator Matthew Mercer on the aftershow Talks Machina. Also, Panic Grimtongue and Greckles Birdman in The Unexpectables are bisexual. Panic is depicted as having multiple love interests, primarily male. Greckles is shown having attraction to the character Remy Corbeau. Both characters hired male and female escorts in episode 26.

== Music ==
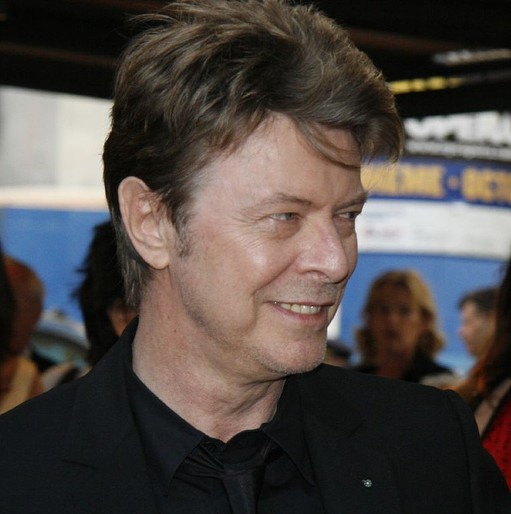
Bisexual English singer-songwriter and actor, David Bowie in September 2006

In 2003, GLAAD, in a report, focused on bisexual representation in the music industry, noting that bisexuality in music "has been prevalent...dating back to at least the 1920's and 1930's," citing musicians such as Bessie Smith and Josephine Baker, along with Elton John, Janis Joplin, and David Bowie in the 1960s and 1970s. Their report noted that in the 1990s "more bisexual men and women in the industry" came out of the closet, including artists such as Ani DiFranco, Tom Robinson, Jill Sobule, Joan Osborne, Sophie B. Hawkins, and Meshell Ndegeocello. The report predicted that this would open the doors for "other artists to come out and express their whole selves through the powerful medium of music." This was reaffirmed by The Advocate which stated that there are "plenty of songs about being attracted to both men and women" from LGBT music, sometimes lamenting "what it's like to be bisexual in their music," even songs from heterosexual artists, and listed 29 tracks which focus on bisexuality.

The Advocate and Pride.com both highlighted various popular music songs about bisexuality. Both publications pointed to Panic! at the Disco's "Girls / Girls / Boys" (2013), Demi Lovato's "Cool for the Summer" (2015), The Veronicas' "Take Me on the Floor" (2008), Lady Gaga's "Poker Face" (2008), and Book of Love's "Pretty Boys and Pretty Girls" (1988), as examples of such songs. At the same time, College Magazine and Pride.com noted that Janelle Monáe's "Make Me Feel" (2018) focused on bisexuality, while The Advocate and College Magazine said the same about the song "Girls / Girls / Boys" and David Bowie's "John, I'm Only Dancing" (1972). Each of these publications listed an array of other songs, but none of these tracks were duplicated on the lists of other publications.

== Literature ==
Donald E. Hall on the now-defunct glbtq Encyclopedia Project extensively focused on bisexual literature, noting that while bisexual experiences appear throughout literature, it is often not discussed from a bisexual perspective, with specific or implied evidence of erotic activity by a single character with another character is considered as evidence of their "primary sexual orientation" as heterosexual or homosexual, relying on an existing gender binary, leading to bisexual erasure. Hall aimed to counter this trend, first highlighting specific theories of bisexuality posed by Sigmund Freud, Wilhelm Stekel, and Fred Klein, then noting that bisexuality existed among ancient Greeks and Romans, with mention in works by "Homer, Anacreon...Pindar...Plutarch, Cicero, and Catullus," along with vaue references in Satyricon by Petronius and in the "life and work of Sappho". The project also pointed to bisexual themes in sonnets by William Shakespeare and Marlowe, in the activities by French writer Madame de La Fayette and English poet Katherine Philips, and the writings of Lord Byron. Erotic Victorian works such as The Adventures of a Schoolboy (1866) and My Secret Life (1888) were noted as having bisexual themes. Hall also pointed to the title character in Mademoiselle de Maupin (1835) as "explicitly bisexual," the love affairs of a poet named Paul Verlaine, the works of Walt Whitman, the poetry of Emily Dickinson, and the works of Oscar Wilde. Further, it was noted that early twentieth century works revolve around the idea of a "true" heterosexual or homosexual identity, even within works with bisexual characters like Maurice (1914), The Well of Loneliness (1928), and Orlando: A Biography (1928). Hall said this is because bisexual appeared in this literature in a "a tortured, tense state," citing many novels by D. H. Lawrence, while later novels like Brideshead Revisited (1945) and Giovanni's Room (1956) portrayed bisexuality as a phase that characters need to move past to avoid "personal disaster." Countering this, the project stated, were the afterward of The City and the Pillar (1948), works by Colette, the French novelist, the sci-fi novel The Left Hand of Darkness (1969), Woman on the Edge of Time (1976), The Color Purple (1982) as well in the works of Hélène Cixous and Kate Millett. Furthermore, the short stories of Paul Bowles, Ancient Evenings (1983), The Man Who Fell in Love with the Moon (1991), the "works of David Leavitt and the poet Gavin Dillard" for their positive bisexual representation. Finally, Hall concluded with a call for action:

...the discourse on sexuality has rewidened since the mid-twentieth century so that validation for bisexuals is no longer impossible to locate in literature and social movements. Conceptualizations in the 1990s of a broad notion of a "queer" identity...have been welcomed by many in the subsumed communities, even as others have resisted any revision in the narrower, binarized notions of identity...But simplistic designations of all human beings as fundamentally heterosexual or homosexual are clearly as oppressive toward some people as institutionalized homophobia has been toward gays and lesbians...in recognizing the unique interests of the bisexual community, as well as the numerous ways such interests intersect with those of the gay and lesbian communities, we can come to a better understanding of social history and the rich heritage of literary traditions and representations that counter heterosexism and challenge the narrow, tradition-bound, and oppressive categories through which society identifies and thereby judges people.

The wending "discourse of sexuality" and improved bisexual representation was reflected in novels such as John Glassco's Fetish Girl (1972), Jane Ransom's novel, Bye-Bye, Tom Perrotta's Little Children, Seanan McGuire's October Daye novels, Stieg Larsson's The Girl Who Played with Fire, and Ellen Kushner's The Privilege of the Sword. Kusher, on a post on her Tumblr confirmed one of the novel's characters as bisexual.

== Comics ==
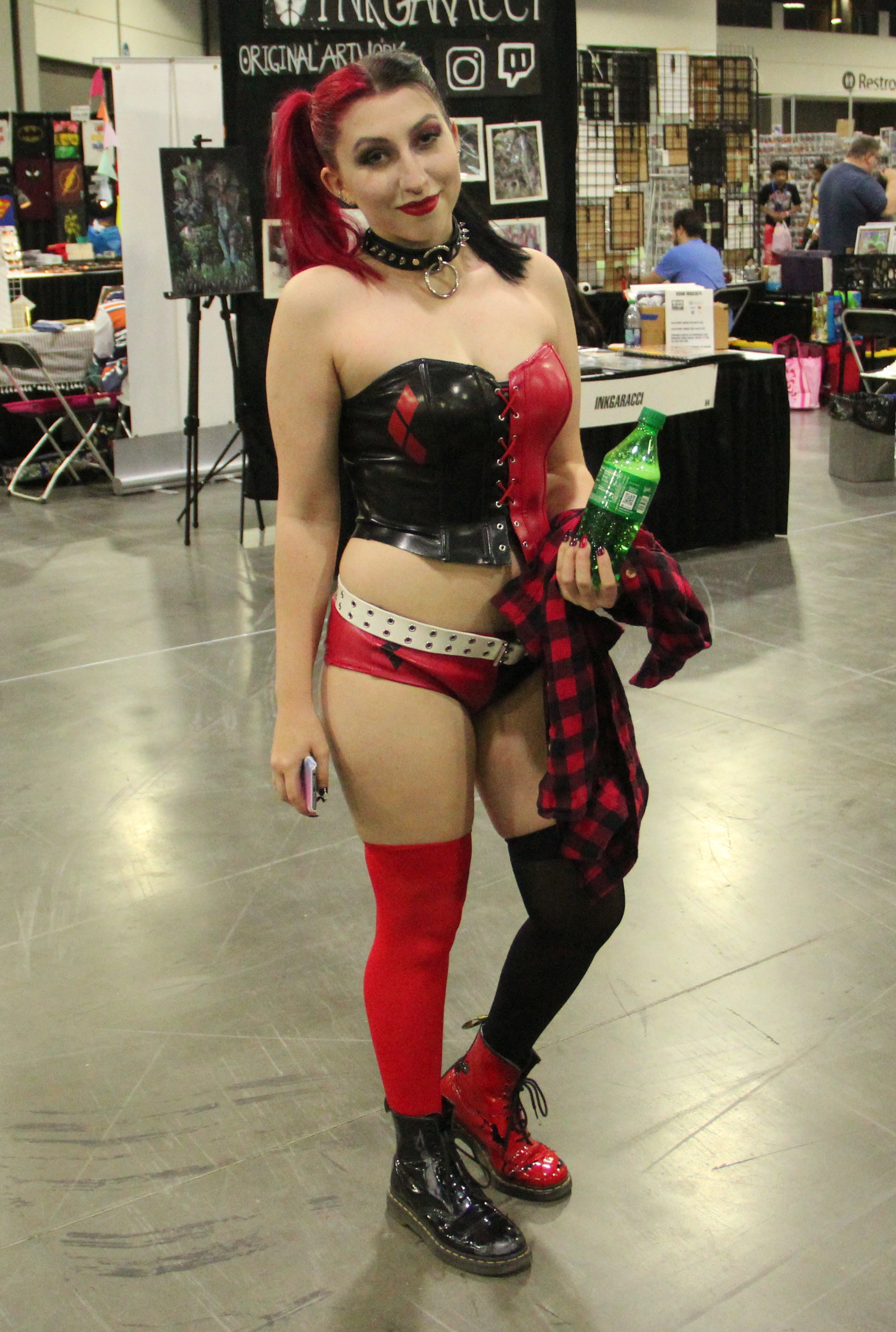
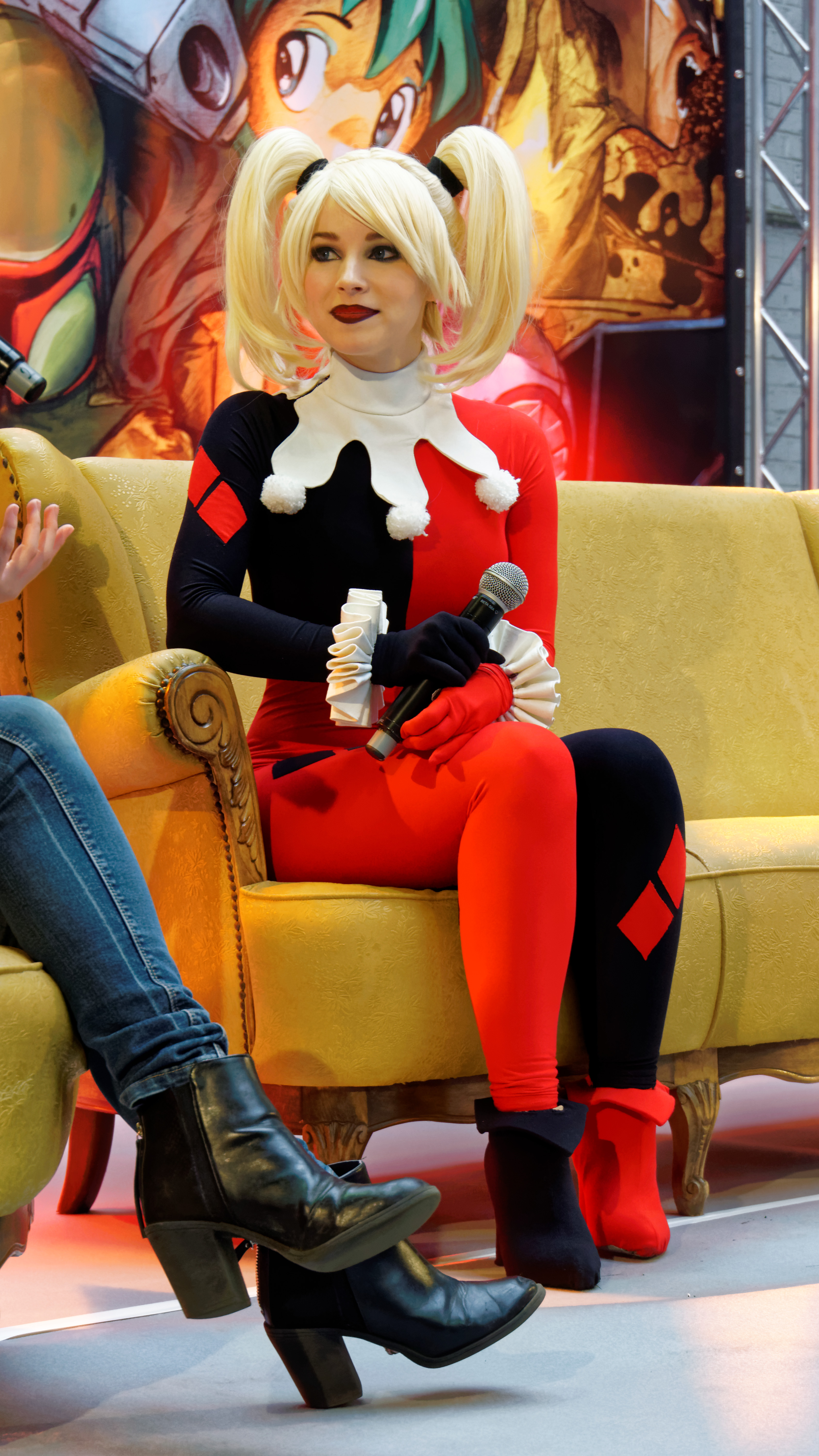
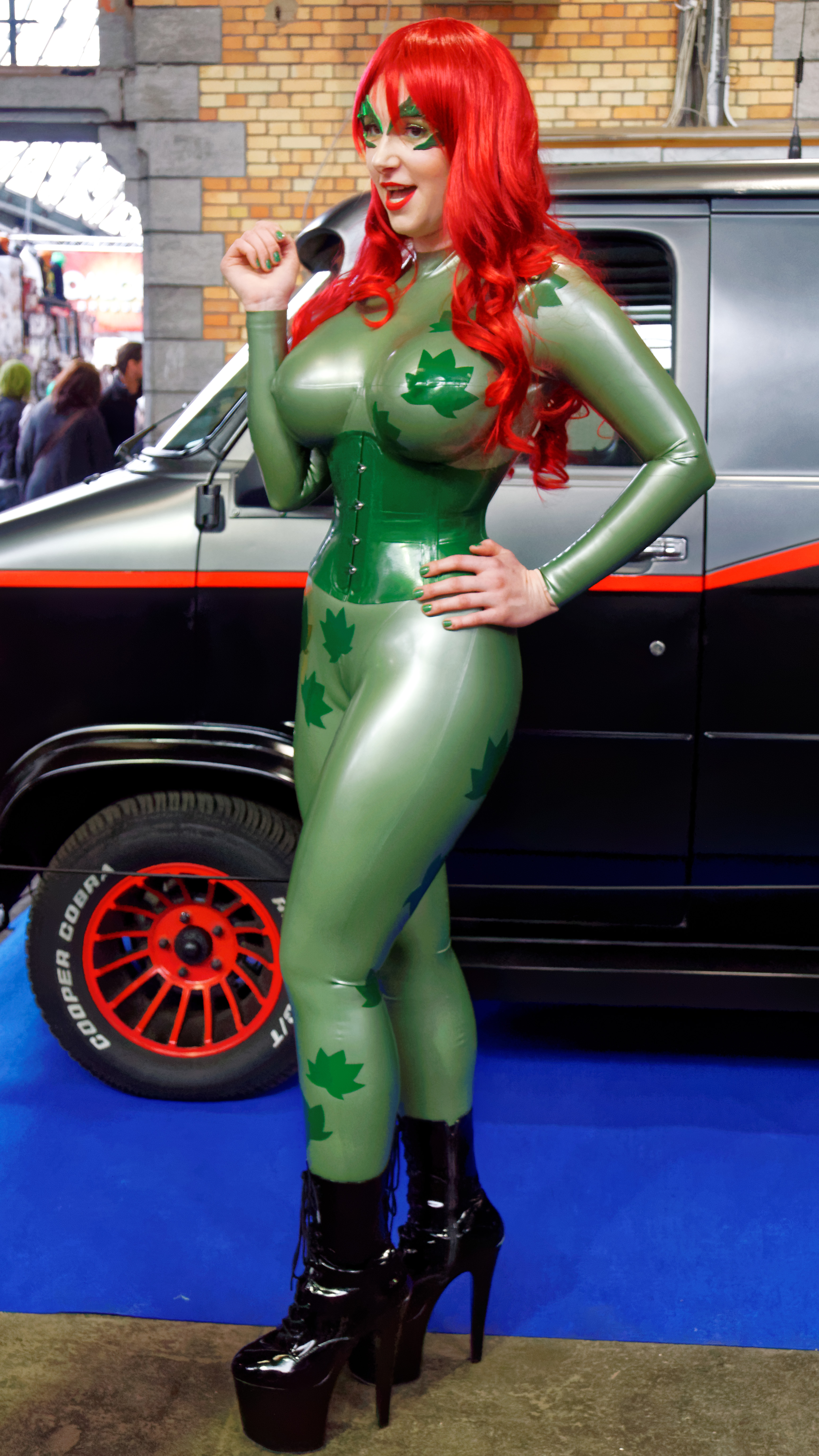
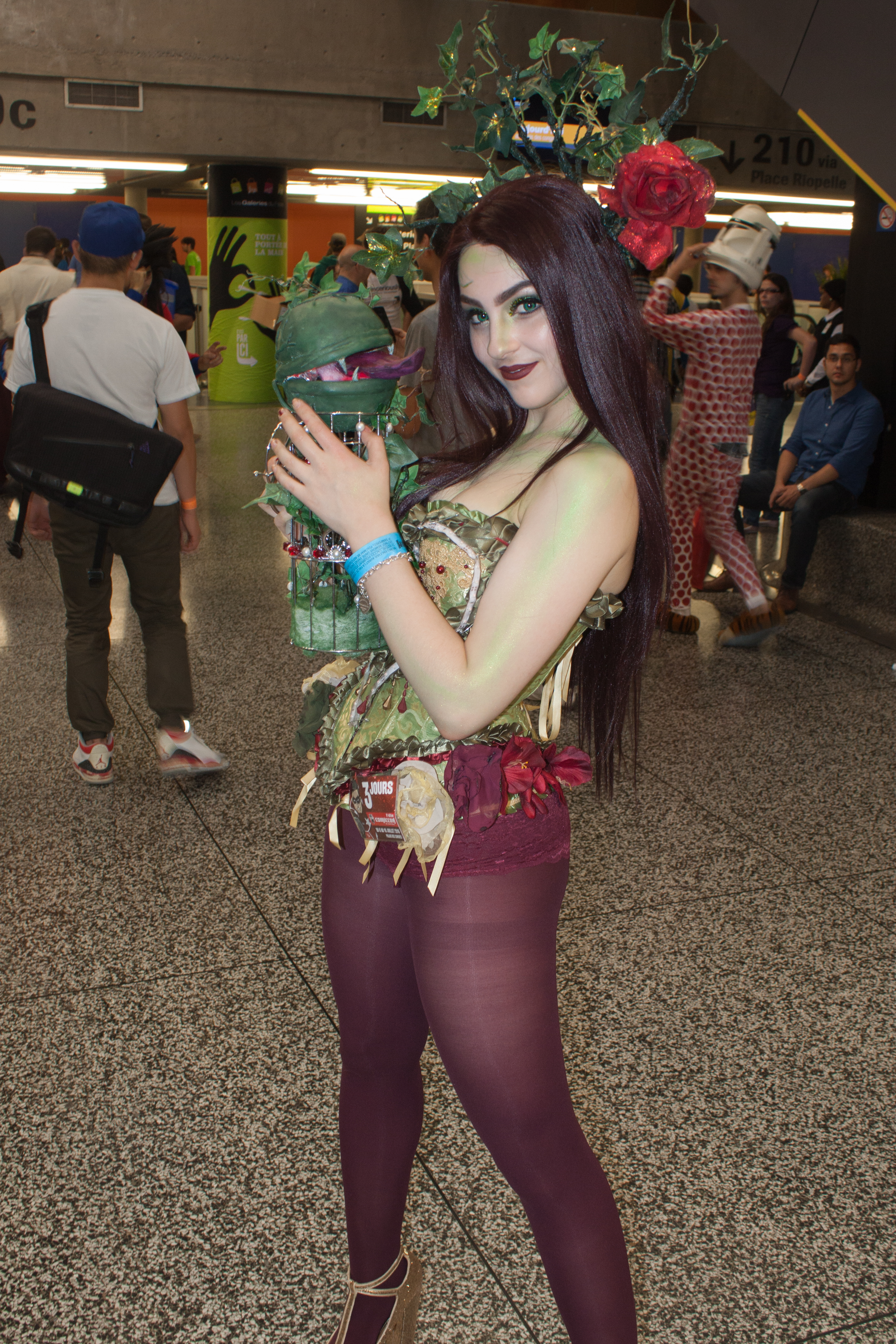
Cosplays of the bisexual characters Harley Quinn and Poison Ivy

Comic books and webcomics have featured numerous bisexual characters over the years. This includes characters such as Mystique, Loki, Valkyrie, and even Wonder Woman. Wonder Woman was confirmed as bisexual in a September 2016 interview with comic book writer Greg Rucka. While The Mary Sue argues that Loki is not canonically genderfluid or bisexual, Loki was confirmed as bisexual in the book "Loki: Agent of Asgard" as well as in the Loki television series and by the director, Kate Herron, of the Loki series, and elsewhere as genderfluid.

Screen Rant, in an article about Marvel characters who are confirmed as bisexual and those who are only seen that way by fans, stated that Deadpool and Tony Stark are canon bisexual. In the same article, Screen Rant notes that some fans consider Peter Parker, Sam Wilson, Carol Danvers, Bucky Barnes, and Steve Rogers to be bisexual, but this is not canon. On Parker, this is promoted by a "vocal subsection of the LGBTQ+ comic fandom" with fans shipping Parker with male characters on fan fictions on Archive of Our Own dating back to 2002. On the other hand, The Geekiary noted further characters from DC Comics, with a qualifier that the characters they listed likely fell under the term of pansexual due to the fact that bisexuality exists "on a spectrum." Their list included John Constantine, Catwoman, Harley Quinn, Poison Ivy, Jericho, Jeanette, Daken, Shatterstar, and Homelander. Daken, as noted by a writer for the character, regularly seduces male and females to suit his own ends, with writer Marjorie Liu calling him "no more homosexual than he is heterosexual," adding it "about control" for Daken. In X-Factor in 2010, Peter David, Shatterstar tries to explore his new world of sexual potential for the first time.

In 2020, a new Guardians of the Galaxy comic from Marvel portrayed the character Peter Quill, otherwise known as Star-Lord, as in a "polyamorous bisexual relationship." CNET further stated that Valkyrie is another bisexual woman in Marvel comics and would be "portrayed as bisexual on screen" in Thor: Love and Thunder.

== See also ==
- Biphobia
- The Bisexual Option
- Bi the Way
- Bisexual lighting
- List of bisexuals
- LGBT stereotypes
- Media portrayal of lesbianism
- Media portrayals of transgender people
- Media portrayal of asexuality
- Media portrayal of pansexuality
- Media portrayal of LGBT people
