= Rose by Any Other Name... =

1997 film

- Directed by: Kyle Schickner
- Written by: Kyle Schickner
- Produced by: Kyle Schickner; Sahira Yasmin Dasti
- Starring: Cathy DeBuono; Kyle Schickner
- Cinematography: David Oye
- Edited by: Kyle Schickner; John Feddersen
- Music by: Mark Lanz Weiser
- Production company: FenceSitter Films
- Distributed by: Global Telemedia Inc.
- Release date: March 11, 1997
- Running time: 92 minutes
- Country: United States
- Language: English
- Budget: $150,000

Rose By Any Other Name... is a 1997 American satirical romantic comedy film written, produced, directed by and starring Kyle Schickner. The plot and title are loosely based on William Shakespeare's Romeo and Juliet, the film is set in the US around the turn of the 21st century, gently poking fun at life, manners, morals as well as the tensions within the modern LGBT and liberal communities. The film was followed by a web series of the same name.

== Plot ==
The story follows the main characters Rose, a comfortably lesbian woman, and Anthony, a decent progressive heterosexual man who serendipitously meet and then unexpectedly find themselves falling for each other. Rose has to navigate the reaction of her friends (they aren't thrilled) and her family (they are) while Anthony too has to deal with his friends who are equally nonplussed.

== Production ==
The story was written and produced by Kyle Schickner, a bisexual rights activist as well as being a film producer, writer, director and actor. It began as a successful Off-Off-Broadway Production in 1996 at New York City's Sanford Meisner Theater which was turned into a well received 1997 Indie film by Schickner's FenceSitter Films. In 2008/2009 FenceSitter Films began working with an American Cable TV Network to spin off Rose by Any Other Name ... into a weekly TV series.

== Controversy and web series ==
According to Schickner after production had gotten underway "at the 11th hour as they were setting up to shoot the pilot the network expressed concern over how the cutting-edge social theme might play with some of their core viewership and decided to look at more data to see what kind of response the show might get". So with the assistance of American Institute of Bisexuality the project was turned into a web series with each webisode being posted on the FenceSitter Films YouTube channel. Episodes 7–9 and 11 are no longer available on said channel due to a successful copyright claim.

== See also ==
- List of media portrayals of bisexuality
- Bisexual community
- Chasing Amy
- Bob & Rose
