= Steam (film) =

- Theatrical release poster
- Directed by: Kyle Schickner
- Written by: Kyle Schickner
- Starring: Ally Sheedy; Ruby Dee; Kate Siegel; Chelsea Handler
- Cinematography: David Oye
- Edited by: Thom Obarski
- Music by: Damian Montano
- Distributed by: FenceSitter Films
- Release date: November 15, 2007
- Running time: 120 minutes
- Country: United States
- Language: English

Steam is a 2007 film written and directed by Kyle Schickner, produced by FenceSitter Films, and starring Ruby Dee, Ally Sheedy and Kate Siegel.

== Plot ==
A college student, a single middle aged mother and an older widow meet in a steam room.

Elizabeth (Kate Siegel) is a college freshman, beginning to understand her lesbian identity in the shadow of her strict Catholic parents. Laurie (Ally Sheedy) is just beginning a relationship with her son's young coach while her ex-husband tries to use their son against her. An older widow, Doris (Ruby Dee), after years of loneliness, has met a new man.

The film weaves their stories together, exploring the similarities that connect three very different women.

== Cast ==
- Kate Siegel as Elizabeth
- Ally Sheedy as Laurie
- Ruby Dee as Doris
- Alan Ritchson as Roy
- Chelsea Handler as Jacky
- Charles Robinson as Reverend Patterson
- DeWanda Wise as Lynn
- Reshma Shetty as Niala
- Lane Davies as Frank
- Zach Mills as TJ

== Critical reception ==
Critics Notebook, in its review, says, "Steam" is meant to be a film about women coming together despite the differences in their lives, but instead of giving them parts to sink their teeth into, Doris, Elizabeth, and Laurie have to spend their time getting shouted at, patronized, or lectured by various men.

New York Guru describes the overall film as having a weak screenplay alongside stilted dialogue that fails to bring any of the characters to life, despite Ally Sheedy's decent performance in the film.
