= Harlem Nights =

1989 film by Eddie Murphy

- Theatrical release poster by Drew Struzan
- Directed by: Eddie Murphy
- Written by: Eddie Murphy
- Produced by: Mark Lipsky; Robert D. Wachs
- Starring: Eddie Murphy; Richard Pryor
- Cinematography: Woody Omens
- Edited by: Alan Balsam; George Bowers
- Music by: Herbie Hancock
- Production company: Eddie Murphy Productions
- Distributed by: Paramount Pictures
- Release date: November 17, 1989
- Running time: 116 minutes
- Country: United States
- Language: English
- Budget: $30 million
- Box office: $60.9 million

Harlem Nights is a 1989 American crime comedy-drama film starring, written and directed by Eddie Murphy. The film co-stars Richard Pryor, Redd Foxx (in his last film appearance before his death in 1991), Danny Aiello, Michael Lerner, Della Reese and Murphy's older brother Charlie. The film was released theatrically on November 17, 1989, by Paramount Pictures. The film tells the story of "Sugar" Ray and Vernest "Quick" Brown as a team running a nightclub in the late 1930s in Harlem while contending with gangsters and corrupt police officials.

Harlem Nights is, as of 2026, Eddie Murphy's only directorial effort. He had always wanted to direct and star in a period piece, as well as work with Pryor, whom he considered his greatest influence in stand-up comedy. Reviewers panned the film, with Gene Siskel and Roger Ebert choosing Harlem Nights as ranking among the worst films of 1989. At the 10th Golden Raspberry Awards, Murphy won the Golden Raspberry Award for Worst Screenplay.

The film grossed $60.9 million against a production budget of $30 million.

== Plot ==
In 1918 Harlem, small-time gambling operator Sugar Ray is nearly killed by a disgruntled customer, but his young errand boy, Vernest Brown, shoots the man dead. Discovering that Vernest is an orphan, Ray takes him in and raises him as his son.

In 1938, the now-affluent Ray and Vernest—known as Quick—run the upscale Club Sugar Ray, with gambling and dancing in the front and a brothel in the back. The club's success threatens the business interests of ruthless white gangster Bugsy Calhoune, who sends corrupt police sergeant Phil Cantone to demand a majority of the weekly earnings. Realizing this will destroy the club, Ray proposes relocating to another city, but Quick is eager to confront Calhoune. Ray chastises him for his reckless immaturity, warning that such defiance will only get him killed. Still, Ray suggests a scheme to strike back before leaving: on the night of a much-anticipated boxing match between their friend, world heavyweight champion Jack Jenkins, and Michael Kirkpatrick, Ray's crew will rob the betting houses—most of them owned by Calhoune—of more than $750,000 in cash. (Note: $750,000 in 1938 is equivalent to $17.2 million in 2025.) Ray and his associates also wager on Kirkpatrick to win, convincing Calhoune that Jenkins will throw the fight and leading him to stake $500,000 on Kirkpatrick.

After Calhoune has his enforcer Tommy Smalls murdered for embezzling funds, Quick visits Smalls' apartment in search of information but leaves upon discovering his corpse. Smalls' brother Reggie sees Quick leaving and assumes he is the killer. Quick meets Calhoune's Creole mistress, Dominique LaRue, for a romantic dinner, unaware that Calhoune is accompanying her. Calhoune offers him a job managing the Pitty-Pat Club, which Quick declines. Outside, Quick is ambushed by Reggie and his friends; he kills them in self-defense, believing they were sent by Calhoune to assassinate him. Later, Calhoune sends Dominique to seduce Quick. Suspicious, Quick finds a gun hidden in her bed and unloads it. When Dominique, unaware, tries to use the weapon against him, Quick shoots her dead. Ray sends Quick into hiding, while Calhoune retaliates by having the club destroyed.

Ray learns that Calhoune's bagman, Richie Vento, will be collecting the betting cash. His friend Madame Vera arranges for one of her escorts, Sunshine, to seduce Richie and persuade him to let her accompany him on the collection. Richie gathers the money and stores it in his car, placing it beside Sunshine's identical bag. An arranged car crash allows Ray and Quick, disguised as policemen, to step in. They seize the money bag, claiming Sunshine is a heroin dealer and that the bag holds narcotics. Two white officers then arrive, dismiss Ray and Quick, and take Sunshine and the bag into custody. Cantone, who has been overseeing the delivery, follows Ray and Quick to an abandoned bank and confronts them. They reveal they had anticipated his involvement, trap him inside the vault, and promise to have him released in a few days.

Calhoune realizes he has been deceived when Jenkins easily defeats Kirkpatrick. He returns home in a rage after also learning that Ray's crew have destroyed the Pitty-Pat. Richie unknowingly delivers Sunshine's bag to Calhoune, who discovers it is filled with parcels of sugar and deduces that Ray is behind the scheme. Vera, apparently fearful for her safety, visits Calhoune and claims that Ray and Quick are at Ray's house. Calhoune leads his men there, but they trigger hidden explosives that kill them all.

On the outskirts of Harlem, Ray and Quick pay off the white officers for their part in the scheme and divide the stolen money. Knowing they can never return, yet believing there is nowhere like Harlem, Ray lingers on the skyline one last time before departing with Quick and their friends to begin a new life.

== Cast ==
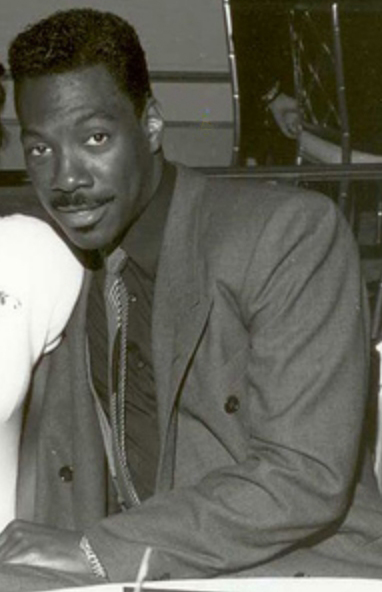
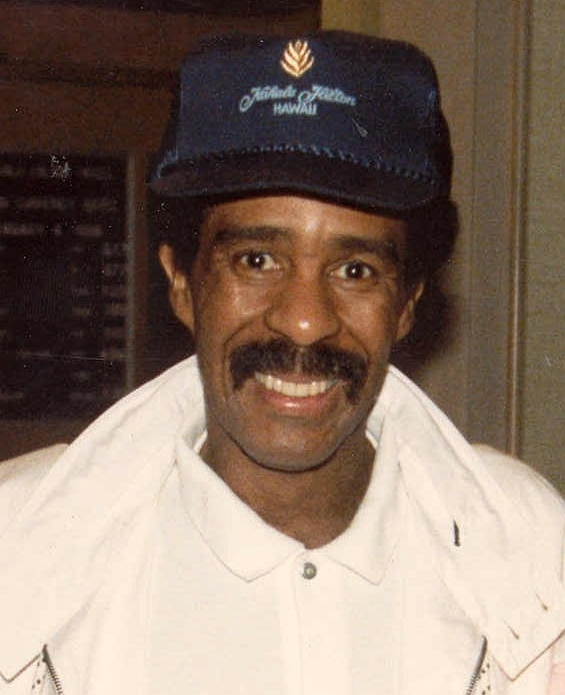
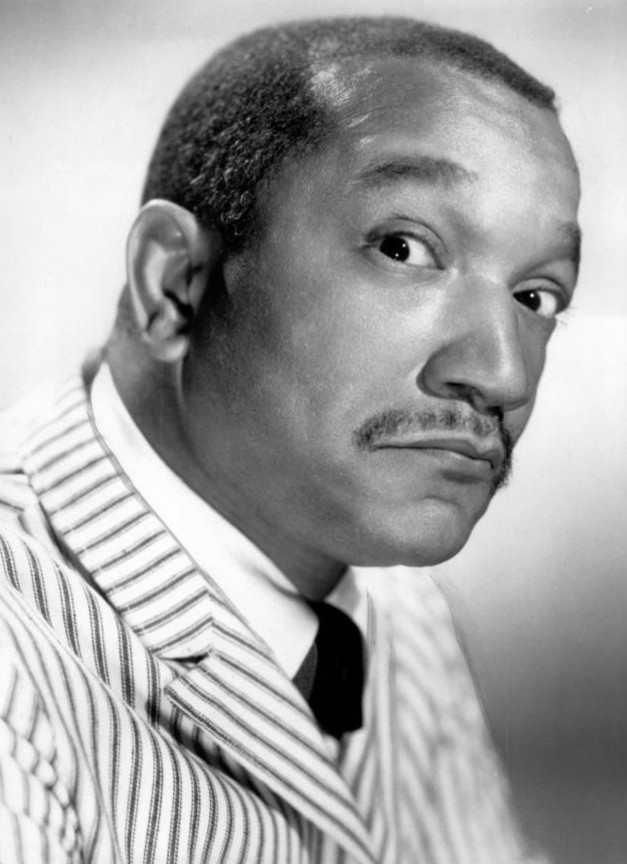
Eddie Murphy (pictured in 1988), Richard Pryor (1986), and Redd Foxx (1966)
- Eddie Murphy as Vernest "Quick" Brown, Sugar Ray's adopted son who helps him run his club
  - Desi Arnez Hines II as Young Vernest "Quick" Brown
- Richard Pryor as "Sugar Ray" Raymond, a candy store owner who also operates an illegal after-hours nightclub
- Redd Foxx as Bennie "Snake Eyes" Wilson, a nearly-blind craps dealer
- Danny Aiello as Sergeant Phil Cantone, a crooked cop who works for Bugsy Calhoun
- Michael Lerner as "Bugsy" Calhoune, the crime boss who owns most of the after-hours clubs in Harlem
- Della Reese as Vera Walker, the madam at Ray's club
- Stan Shaw as Jack Jenkins, the current heavyweight boxing champion
- Jasmine Guy as Dominique La Rue, Bugsy Calhoun's mistress
- Berlinda Tolbert as Annie Raymond, Sugar Ray's wife
- Vic Polizos as Richie Vento, the bag man who makes cash pickups for Bugsy Calhoun
- Lela Rochon as "Sunshine", a prostitute who works at Ray's club
- David Marciano as Tony, one of Bugsy Calhoun's goons
- Arsenio Hall as Reggie Smalls, Tommy's brother
- Thomas Mikal Ford as Tommy Smalls, the manager of one of Bugsy Calhoun's clubs
- Robin Harris as Jerome
- Charlie Murphy as Jimmy
- Miguel A. Núñez Jr. as Broken Nose Man
- Ji-Tu Cumbuka as Toothless Gambler
- Reynaldo Rey as Gambler
- Robi Reed as Employer
- Ty Granderson Jones as Crapshooter
- Steve White as Patron
- Nona Gaye as Patron
- Kathleen Bradley as Lady
- Carmen Filpi as Doorman
- Rick Aiello as Man
- Mike Genovese as Desk Sergeant
- William Utay as Cop
- Michael Buffer as Announcer
- Eugene Robert Glazer as Detective Hogan
- Michael Stroka as Detective Simms
- Woody Omens as Ringside Announcer

== Production ==
The part of Dominique La Rue, played by Jasmine Guy, was originally cast with actress Michael Michele. Michele was fired during production because, according to Eddie Murphy, she "wasn't working out". Michele sued Murphy, saying that in reality she was fired for rejecting Murphy's romantic advances. Murphy denied the charge, saying that he had never even had a private conversation with her. The lawsuit was settled out of court for an undisclosed sum.

"It's turning out to be more pleasant than I expected," Richard Pryor told Rolling Stone. "[Murphy is] wise enough to listen to people. I seen him be very patient with his actors. It's not a lark to him. He's really serious." "He's on top of the world and he's doing a hell of a job," agreed Redd Foxx. "He sure knows how to handle people with sensitivity. He'll come over to your side and give private direction—he never embarrasses anyone." "You walk around here and look at the people," added Pryor. "Have you ever in your life seen this many black people on a movie set? I haven't."

About the movie's reception, Murphy said:

It wasn't a pleasurable experience. I just wanted to direct—just to see if I can do it. And I found out that I can't, and I won't do it anymore. And the biggest thing is I didn't enjoy doing it. The problem with Harlem Nights wasn't the directing as much as it was the writing of it. It was just written fucked up, and that's because I threw it together real quick. And then it was disappointing because Richard wasn't the way I thought Richard was gonna be. I thought it would be like a collaborative thing where I would get to work with my idol, and then it would be like, "This is great." But Richard would come to the set, say his line and leave, it wasn't like a collaborative thing.

Later he said:

That movie was a blur. It was Richard [Pryor], Robin Harris—all comedians. I remember Richard and Redd Foxx laughing offstage during the whole movie. The funniest shit was off camera, we're all just crying. Redd was a really funny dude, he would have the set screaming all the time. But afterwards it was like, Whoa, that's a lot of work. I was really young when I did it. I had one foot in the club, and one foot on the set, a lot of shit going on. It's amazing it came together.

He also said he didn't know Pryor was sick at the time.

He was sick with MS by then, but nobody knew it was going on. And I was like a puppy to him 'cause he was my idol. "Hey! Let's go make this movie!" I never put it together what was happening till afterwards. So it was kind of sad, that part of it.

== Release ==
=== Box office ===
Harlem Nights was released in the United States and Canada on November 17, 1989. During its opening weekend it grossed a total of $16.1 million from 2,180 theaters—an average of $7,383 per theater—making it the highest-grossing film of the weekend, ahead of Look Who's Talking ($8.5 million) in its sixth week of release, and the debuting The Little Mermaid ($6 million). This broke the record for an opening three-day gross during the pre-Christmas end of year period. In its second weekend, Harlem Nights fell to the number 2 position with a $11.1 million gross—a 30.8% drop from the previous week—placing it behind the debut of Back to the Future Part II ($27.8 million) and ahead of The Little Mermaid ($8.4 million). By its third weekend, Harlem Nights fell to the number 3 position with a $5.2 million gross, placing it behind Back to the Future Part II ($12.1 million) and the debut of National Lampoon's Christmas Vacation ($11.8 million).

In total, Harlem Nights grossed $60.9 million, making it only the 21st-highest-grossing film of 1989 in the United States and Canada. The film's gross outside of these countries is unknown.

=== Movie theater shooting controversy ===
On November 17, 1989, two men were shot in the parking lot outside of the AMC Americana 8 theater in the Detroit suburb of Southfield, Michigan. According to witnesses quoted in the Detroit Free Press, the shooting happened on opening night taking place during a shooting spree in the film's opening. A 22-year-old woman, who panicked and ran into traffic, was in critical condition two days later at the city's Providence Hospital; her name was withheld by police. Less than an hour after the shooting, police arrived at the theater to find a 24-year-old Detroit man who had shot at an officer. The gunman was wounded when the officer shot him back in the theater parking lot. The incident caused the theater chain to cancel showings of Harlem Nights and install metal detectors. One resident of the area, D'Shanna Watson, said:

There were so many people in the theater and there was so much going on, they stopped the movie three times.

Later that night, brawlers were ejected from a Sacramento theater showing Harlem Nights. Their feud continued in a parking lot and ended with gunshots. Two 24-year-old men were seriously injured. An hour later, Marcel Thompson, 17, was fatally shot in a similar fight at a theater in Richmond, California. When police stopped the projection of Harlem Nights to find suspects, an hour-long riot erupted. In Boston, two separate stabbings left two injured outside Loew’s Cinema 7 and Mayor Raymond Flynn saw so many fistfights taking place in a crowd leaving Harlem Nights that he at first threatened to close the theater down but decided to tighten police security at the theater. Flynn blamed the film for the riot, stating that it "glorifies violence." However, Raymond Howard, a lieutenant of the Richmond police department, defended the film, saying, "There's nothing wrong with the show. But this tells me something about the nature of kids who are going to see these shows."

If there's a fight at McDonald's, what does that have to do with McDonald's? ... If there's a fight at Giants Stadium, are you going to blame the Giants? Of course not. It's not about the Eddie Murphy movie.

— Bob Wachs, Eddie Murphy's manager, on the movie theatre incidents, December 4, 1989.

== Reception ==
=== Critical response ===
Michael Wilmington noted in the Los Angeles Times that the "production design lacks glitter. The movie also lacks the Harlem outside the gaudy gangland environs, the poverty, filth, pain, humanity, humor and danger that feeds these mobster fantasies."

Both Gene Siskel and Roger Ebert panned the film; it was featured on their "Worst of 1989" review episode of their series At the Movies with Siskel stating that it was racist, sexist, and badly directed, and Ebert agreeing with him, also adding that they thought Murphy was directing a film to call himself a director.

About the negative reception, Eddie Murphy said:

There was a validity to a lot of things that people were saying about Harlem Nights but then they went extra mean on it because it was me. I guess they viewed it as someone with an ego out-of-control doing all these things... It wasn't that at all. As much as "let me see if I can do that" and I did. And I was like "I don't like this. I'm never doing this again".

On the review aggregator website Rotten Tomatoes, 28% of 36 critics' reviews are positive, with an average rating of 3.9/10. The website's consensus reads: "An all-star comedy lineup is wasted on a paper-thin plot and painfully clunky dialogue." However, the Rotten Tomatoes audience approval stands at 80%. Metacritic, which uses a weighted average, assigned the film a score of 16 out of 100, based on 14 critics, indicating "overwhelming dislike".

=== Accolades ===
- Stinkers Bad Movie Awards:
  - Worst Picture
- Golden Raspberry Award:
  - Worst Screenplay (Eddie Murphy)

Nominated

- Academy Awards:
  - Academy Award for Best Costume Design (Joe I. Tompkins)
- Golden Raspberry Award
  - Worst Director (Eddie Murphy)

== Footnotes ==
Awards
Preceded by Caddyshack II	Stinker Award for Worst Picture; 1989 Stinkers Bad Movie Awards	Succeeded by The Bonfire of the Vanities
