= Strange Fruit (film) =

- Theatrical release poster
- Directed by: Kyle Schickner
- Written by: Kyle Schickner
- Cinematography: David Oye
- Edited by: Michael Simms, Kyle Schickner
- Music by: Sidney James
- Distributed by: FenceSitter Films
- Release date: 2004
- Running time: 115 minutes
- Country: United States
- Language: English

Strange Fruit is a 2004 film written and directed by Kyle Schickner and starring Kent Faulcon as William Boyals and Berlinda Tolbert as Emma Ayers. It was produced by FenceSitter Films. The title comes from the 1939 Billie Holiday song.

== Premise ==
New York attorney William Boyals has escaped the Louisiana bayou of his childhood, but he must return to investigate the death of a childhood friend who, like Boyals himself, was both black and gay.

== Cast ==
- Kent Faulcon as William Boyals
- Berlinda Tolbert as Emma Ayers
- David Raibon as Duane Ayers
- Christopher Warren as Cedric
- Sam Jones as Sheriff Jensey
- Vergil J. Smith as Jo-Jo
- Shane Woodson as Jordan Walker
- Ed Brigadier as Arnold West
- Charlie Schroeder as Tommy
- Jared Day as Deputy Conover
- Jon Finck as Deputy Adams
- Ron Bottitta as Dep. Curtis Butler
- Christopher May as Deputy Mathers
- Cecile M. Johnson as Martha Boyals
- Alex Boling as Paulie (voice)
- Emily Gorgen as Tanya
- Earl Thompson as Manny
- Harace Carpenter as Buddy Bleu
- Leon Morenzie as Walter Durant
- Ron Allen as Kelvin Ayers
- Walt Turner as Jerry West
- Wilbert Lewis as Preacher
- Gavin Lewis as André
- Carlo Daquin as Derrik
- Tommy Cole as Diesel
- Tory Andrews as Angry Gaytor Patron
- Arthur LeBlanc as Cyril
- Randy Maggiore as Lowell
- Lakesha Lenoir as Ruby
- Ted Duhon as Deputy Guidry
- Agnes DeRouen as Reporter
- Richard Pushkin as Doctor
- David L. Corrigan as Deputy Blaine

== Production ==
When told by producers, who had offered the film a $6 million budget, that the lead character could not be both black and gay, Kyle Schickner left the studio to produce the film for only $250,000.
