= 1989 Stinkers Bad Movie Awards =

12th Award ceremony by the Stinkers Bad Movie Awards

The 12th Stinkers Bad Movie Awards were released by the Hastings Bad Cinema Society in 1990 to honour the worst films the film industry had to offer in 1989. As follows, there was only a Worst Picture category with provided commentary for each nominee, as well as a list of films that were also considered for the final list but ultimately failed to make the cut (26 films total).

== Worst Picture Ballot ==
Film	Production company(s)
Harlem Nights	Paramount Pictures
Best of the Best	Taurus Entertainment
Eddie and the Cruisers II: Eddie Lives!	Scotti Bros
The Gods Must Be Crazy II	Columbia Pictures
Wicked Stepmother	MGM, United Artists

=== Dishonourable Mentions ===
- Cyborg (Cannon)
- Earth Girls Are Easy (Vestron)
- Erik the Viking (Orion)
- Fletch Lives (Universal)
- Her Alibi (Warner Bros.)
- The January Man (MGM)
- K-9 (Universal)
- The Karate Kid Part III (Columbia)
- Lock Up (TriStar)
- Next of Kin (Warner Bros.)
- Old Gringo (Columbia)
- Pink Cadillac (Warner Bros.)
- The Return of Swamp Thing (Millimeter Films)
- Road House (MGM/UA)
- Rude Awakening (Orion)
- See No Evil, Hear No Evil (TriStar)
- She's Out of Control (Columbia)
- Slaves of New York (TriStar)
- Speed Zone (Orion)
- Star Trek V: The Final Frontier (Paramount)
- Tango & Cash (Warner Bros.)
- UHF (Orion)
- Uncle Buck (Universal)
- Weekend at Bernie's (Fox)
- Wired (Taurus)
- Young Einstein (Warner Bros.)
