= Wicked Stepmother =

1989 American black comedy film by Larry Cohen

- Theatrical release poster
- Directed by: Larry Cohen
- Written by: Larry Cohen
- Produced by: Robert Littman
- Starring: Bette Davis; Barbara Carrera
- Cinematography: Bryan England
- Edited by: David Kern
- Music by: Robert Folk
- Production company: Metro-Goldwyn-Mayer
- Distributed by: Metro-Goldwyn-Mayer
- Release date: February 3, 1989 (U.S.)
- Running time: 93 minutes
- Country: United States
- Language: English
- Budget: $5 million
- Box office: $70,580 (North America)

Wicked Stepmother is a 1989 American black comedy fantasy film written, produced, and directed by Larry Cohen and starring Bette Davis and Barbara Carrera.

It is best known for being the last film of Bette Davis, who withdrew from the project after filming began, citing major problems with the script, Cohen's direction, and the way she was being photographed. Cohen later claimed she really dropped out due to ill health but avoided publicizing the truth for fear it would affect potential future employment. Davis disputed this claim.

== Synopsis ==
The original plot cast Davis as the title character, a chain-smoking witch named Miranda, who has married Sam while his vegetarian daughter Jenny and son-in-law Steve are on vacation. They return to find their new stepmother has filled their refrigerator with meat and played havoc with their collection of herbs. To explain Davis' absence, the script was rewritten to introduce Miranda's daughter Priscilla, a witch who inhabited Miranda's cat. They both share one existence in human form and while one is human the other must live in the form of a cat the rest of the time. Priscilla takes on a human form while Miranda's spirit inhabits the body of the cat. Priscilla then sets out to defeat Jenny who has figured out that there is something going on. Priscilla uses witchcraft and deception to convince everyone Jenny is wrong. The entire time she refuses to switch bodies with Miranda. Jenny then figures out that they are witches and tries to stop them from ruining her family.

The film ends with a hint at a possible sequel.

== Cast ==
- Bette Davis as Miranda Pierpoint
- Barbara Carrera as Priscilla Pierpoint
- Lionel Stander as Sam
- Colleen Camp as Jenny Fisher
- David Rasche as Steve Fisher
- Shawn Donahue as Mike Fisher
- Tom Bosley as Lieutenant MacIntosh
- Richard Moll as Nathan Pringle
- Evelyn Keyes as Witch Instructor
- James Dixon as Detective Flynn
- Seymour Cassel as Feldshine

Joan Crawford, who died in 1977, appears in an archival photograph as the deceased wife of Sam and mother of Jenny. The estranged relationship between Jenny and her late mother is a reference to the exposé memoir Mommie Dearest, written by Crawford's adopted daughter, Christina Crawford. Crawford had an alleged bitter rivalry with Davis during the filming of What Ever Happened to Baby Jane? (1962).

== Reception ==
=== Box office ===
Wicked Stepmother was released in the United States on February 3, 1989, and became a box-office bomb, grossing $43,749 in its opening weekend and $70,580 in North America on a budget of $5 million.

=== Critical response ===
A review in Fangoria lambasted Wicked Stepmother, stating that "this mind-boggingly awful comedy/fantasy offers no laughs, but does provide some of the creepiest moments of half-dead acting ever committed to film" and "emerges as the first unmitigated disaster from the usually reliable Cohen and a tarnish on the memory of Bette Davis". VideoHound's Golden Movie Retriever gave the film one and a half bone out of four in its 1991 edition, but revised it to one later on, concluding that "Davis's move was wise; the result is dismal, and would have been had she stayed". Blockbuster Entertainment's Guide to Movies and Videos labeled Wicked Stepmother a "horror cheapie" and rated it one out of five stars. In contrast, TV Guide calls the film "a good-natured, occasionally hilarious spookshow, graced with a few ingenious special effects and sassily acted—with Davis giving a gleefully nasty, if abbreviated, last film performance".

=== Accolades ===
Year	Award	Category	Recipient	Result	Ref.
1990	12th Stinkers Bad Movie Awards	Worst Picture	Wicked Stepmother	Nominated	

== See also ==
- List of American films of 1989
