= Berlinda Tolbert =

American actress

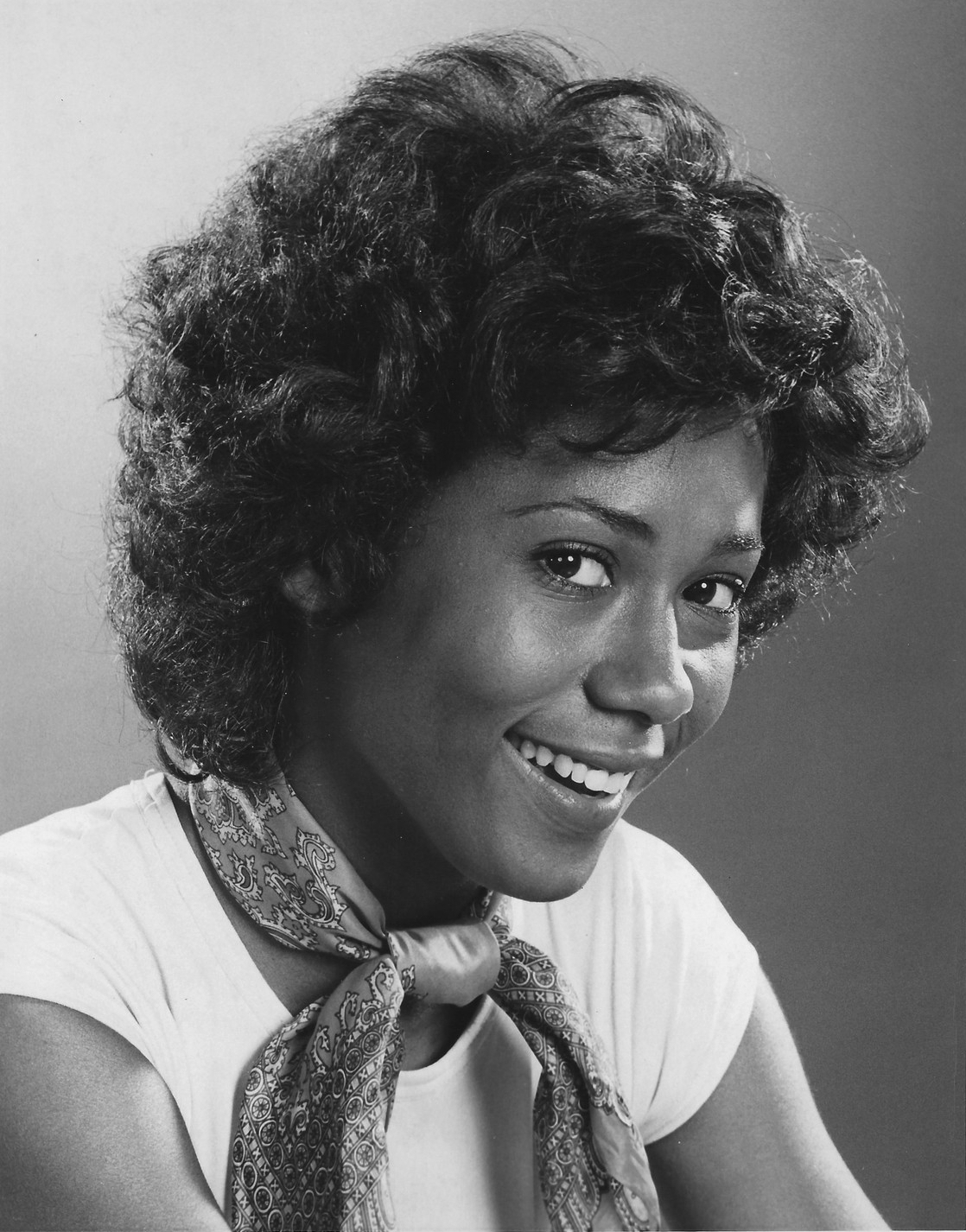
- Tolbert in 1975
- Born: November 4, 1949 (age 76)
- Education: University of North Carolina School of the Arts
- Occupation: Actress
- Years active: 1973–2013
- Known for: Jenny Willis Jefferson – The Jeffersons
- Spouse: Bob Reid (m. 1979)

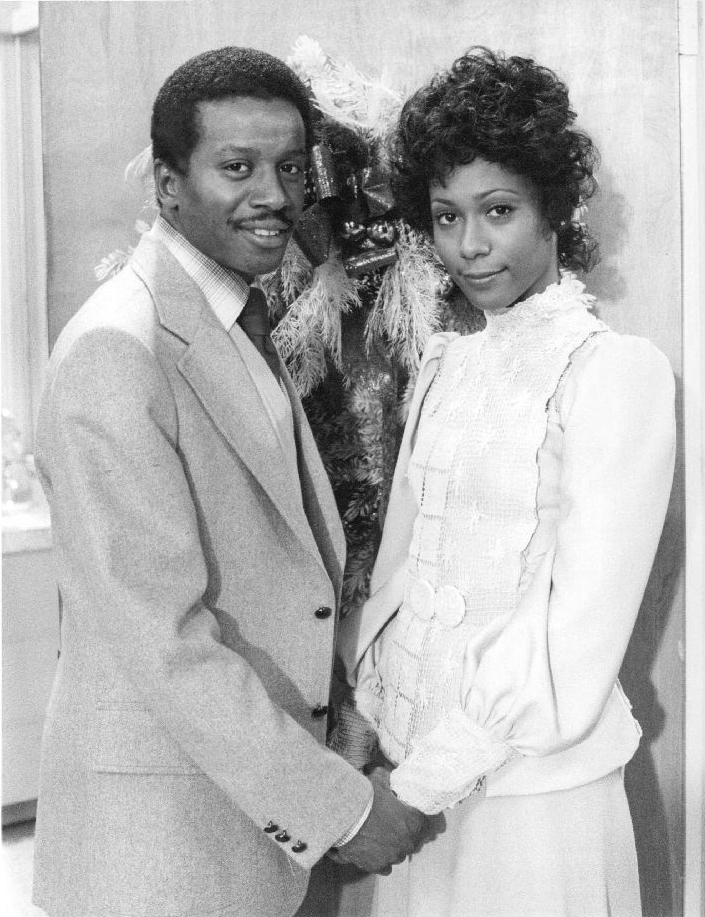
Damon Evans and Tolbert on TV's The Jeffersons (1976)

Berlinda Tolbert (born November 4, 1949) is an American film and television actress. Tolbert is best known for her role as Jenny Willis Jefferson, the daughter of Tom and Helen Willis on the CBS sitcom The Jeffersons, which originally aired from 1975 until 1985.

== Early life and education ==
Tolbert majored in theater at the University of North Carolina School of the Arts in Winston-Salem. She also studied drama in London.

== Career ==
In a 2013 interview, Tolbert stated, "I've only had one job in my entire life... professional actress." She got her first film part from Martin Scorsese in Mean Streets in 1973, when she was in acting school.

=== The Jeffersons ===
On The Jeffersons, Tolbert played Jenny, the daughter of interracial couple Tom and Helen Willis. Jenny had become engaged, as played by a different actress, to Lionel Jefferson, the son of George and Louise, when they were still characters on Norman Lear's "All In The Family". They married and had a daughter. Tolbert played the role of Jenny for the run of the series, from 1975 to 1985.

=== Later career ===
In 1981, Tolbert competed for the CBS team on Battle of the Network Stars. In 1983, Tolbert starred in the Maya Angelou play On A Southern Journey. Following the cancellation of The Jeffersons in 1985, Tolbert appeared in films including Harlem Nights, Goodfellas, and Patriot Games, and television shows including ER, Six Feet Under, and CSI: Crime Scene Investigation. Tolbert appeared in the 2011 indie film Last Ride on the Midwest Pacific.

== Personal life ==
Tolbert married journalist Bob Reid in 1979.

== Filmography ==
=== Film ===
Year	Title	Role	Notes
1974	Airport 1975	Anne	Uncredited/ film debut
1989	Beverly Hills Brats	Nina	
1989	Harlem Nights	Annie	
1990	Goodfellas	Berlinda	
1992	Patriot Games	Sissy	
1994	Dangerous Touch	Sasha Taylor	
2004	Strange Fruit	Emma Ayers	
2007	Live!	Clarissa Boyd	
2011	Last Ride on the Midwest Pacific	Angeline	

=== Television ===
Year	Title	Role	Notes
1974	That's My Mama	Polly Carstairs	Episode: Clifton's Dubious Romance
1974	Sanford and Son	Delores	Episode: Sanford and Niece
1974	The Streets of San Francisco	Chris Jackson	Episode: For Good or Evil
1975	All in the Family	Jenny Willis	Episode: The Jeffersons Move on Up
1975	Mannix	Jobina Rogell	Episode: Chance Meeting
1975	S.W.A.T.	Joanne Wyatt	Episode: Death Score
1975	Police Woman	Lily Thomas	Episode: The Chasers
1975–1985	The Jeffersons	Jenny Willis Jefferson / Jenny Willis	166 episodes
1981–1984	Fantasy Island	Sandy Hoffman / Linda Bell / Billie Joe	3 episodes
1981–1985	The Love Boat	Lynda Miles / Patty Phelps	2 episodes
1983	Matt Houston	Janey Lennox	Episode: The Rock and the Hard Place
1984	Airwolf	Lea Logana	Episode: And They Are Us
1985	Hotel	Michelle Todd	Episode: Resolutions
1987	Amen	Darlene	Episode: Thelma's Reunion
1990	Gabriel's Fire	Shelly	Episode: To Catch a Con: Part 2
1990	Jake and the Fatman	Sharon Lee	Episode: Goodbye
1993	FBI: The Untold Stories	Mary Smith	Episode: Mary
1997	Sabrina, The Teenage Witch	Mrs. Hecht	Episode: The Crucible
1998	7th Heaven	Ms. Hanover	Episode: It Takes Two, Baby
1998	The Army Show	Phyliss Henchy	2 episodes
1999	Home Improvement	Noreen	Episode: The Long and Winding Road: Part 1
2001	Dead Last	Yolanda	Episode: The Problem with Corruption
2003	Half & Half	Denise	Episode: The Big Forbidden Fruit Episode
2004	ER	Nancy Natarelli	Episode: Blood Relations
2004	Strong Medicine		Episode: Cinderella in Scrubs
2005	Six Feet Under	Debra	Episode: Time Flies
2007	CSI: Crime Scene Investigation	Barbara	Episode: Leapin' Lizards
