= Jane Ransom =

American poet

Jane Reavill Ransom is a prize-winning American popular science writer, novelist and poet.

== Biography ==
Ransom graduated from Harrison High School in 1976. She received her B.A. in journalism from Indiana University Bloomington. She holds a Master of Arts in English with a concentration in creative writing, as well as a Master of Arts in Comparative Literature, from New York University.

From 1984 to 1989, she was a New York Daily News national/international editor. She was also an editor for the San Juan Star. In 1990 she held a New York University fellowship in comparative literature, 1988–90. From 1997 to 2002, she was professor of creative writing at Rutgers University and New York University. In 2004, she was distinguished poet in residence at Saint Mary's College of California.

She currently lives in Durham, North Carolina. She is the granddaughter of poet and critic John Crowe Ransom.

== Bibliography ==
Non-Fiction

- Self-Intelligence: The New Science-Based Approach for Reaching Your True Potential

Fiction

- Bye-Bye

Poetry

- Without Asking (Story Line Press, 1989)
- Scene of the Crime (Story Line Press, 1997)

== Prizes and awards ==
- Nicholas Roerich Poetry Prize for Without Asking
- New York University Press Prize 1996 for Fiction for Bye-Bye
- Mamdouha S. Bobst Award for Bye-Bye
- Poetry fellowships at the New York Foundation for the Arts and the Massachusetts Council for the Arts
- Residences at Yaddo and MacDowell
