= Kyle Schickner =

American film director

- Kyle Schickner at work
- Born: New Jersey, United States

Kyle Schickner is an American film producer, writer, director, actor and a bisexual civil rights activist. He is the founder of FenceSitter Films, a production company devoted to entertainment for women, and sexual and ethnic minorities. He currently lives and works in Los Angeles, where he directs films, music videos, a Web series and commercials for his production company FenceSitterFilms.

== Career ==
Schickner attended Harvard from 1993 to 1995 before dropping out to start Off-Off-Broadway theater company, Fencesitter Productions. Based out of the Stanford Meisner Theater, the company produced four successful plays, three of which were written and directed by Schickner himself.

While in college, inspired by hearing a talk given by bisexual rights activist Lani Ka'ahumanu, he formed BIAS (Bisexuals Achieving Solidarity) the first college bisexual rights group in the United States. After seeking out the campus' gay and lesbian organization, Schickner recalls, "I knew I was bisexual, but those who ran the club didn't believe it." He later went on to appear on CNN, Montel Williams, Jane Pratt and several other national television shows, helping to give visibility to what was at that time a largely invisible community.

After writing and producing three successful plays, Schickner moved to cinema in hope of reaching a wider audience. In 1995, FenceSitter Films (the former Fencesitter Productions) started production on Rose by Any Other Name..., a film based on Schickner's most successful play. According to the official website, FenceSitter Films was "founded on the belief that films don't need straight white men as heroes in order to be successful and entertaining." He says, "I wanted to make films [that] a person of color, a woman, or a bisexual person would enjoy watching." Schickner has written and directed five feature films, several commercials and music videos and is now currently producing a Web series of Rose by Any Other Name....

His features include romantic comedy Rose by Any Other Name..., mockumentary Full Frontal, and the critically acclaimed thriller Strange Fruit. His most current feature film, Steam, stars Oscar-nominated actress Ruby Dee, 1980s and indie icon Ally Sheedy as well as up-and-coming young actress Kate Siegel.

== Filmography ==
=== Feature films ===
- Steam (2007) (producer, director, writer)
- Paradise Lost (2006) (producer, director, writer, actor)
- Strange Fruit (2004) (producer, director, writer, actor)
- Full Frontal (2001) (executive producer, director, writer, actor)
- Rose by Any Other Name... (1997) (producer director, writer, actor)

=== Web series ===
- Rose by Any Other Name... (2009) (producer director, writer, actor)
