= FenceSitter Films =

American film and television production company

- Industry: Entertainment
- Founded: 1995
- Headquarters: Los Angeles
- Key people: Kyle Schickner
- Products: Motion pictures, television programming, new media
- Website: www.fencesitterfilms.com

FenceSitter Films is a film production and television production company founded by Kyle Schickner an American film producer, writer, director, actor and a bisexual civil rights activist.

== History ==
It was originally formed in 1995 as FenceSitter Productions, but later the name was changed to the current FenceSitter Films. According to the official website, FenceSitter Films was "founded on the belief that films don't need straight white men as heroes in order to be successful and entertaining." Schickner said, "I wanted to make films [that] a person of color, a woman, or a bisexual person would enjoy watching."

The first feature film made in 1997 was the romantic comedy Rose by Any Other Name... and was the film version of Schickner's most successful Off-Off-Broadway play.

Additional feature films have included the mockumentary Full Frontal and the critically acclaimed thriller Strange Fruit. The most current feature film, Steam, stars Oscar-nominated actress Ruby Dee, 1980s and indie icon Ally Sheedy as well as up-and-coming young actress Kate Siegel.

In late 2008 into 2009 FenceSitter Films began working with an American Cable TV Network to spin-off Rose by Any Other Name... into a weekly TV series. However, according to Schickner "at the 11th hour as they were setting up to shoot the pilot the network expressed concern over how the cutting-edge social theme might play with some of their core viewership and decided to look at more data to see what kind of response the show might get". So with the assistance of American Institute of Bisexuality the project was turned into a Web series with each Webisode being posted on the FenceSitter Films YouTube channel.

== Filmography ==
=== Feature films ===
- Steam (2007) (producer, director, writer)
- Paradise Lost (2006) (producer, director, writer, actor)
- Strange Fruit (2004) (producer, director, writer, actor)
- Full Frontal (2001) (executive producer, director, writer, actor)
- Rose by Any Other Name... (1997) (producer director, writer, actor)

=== Web series ===
- Rose by Any Other Name... (2009) (producer director, writer, actor)
