= Bye-Bye (novel) =

1997 book by Jane Ransom

- First edition
- Author: Jane Ransom
- Language: English
- Publisher: New York University Press
- Publication date: 1997
- Publication place: United States
- Media type: Print (hardback & paperback)
- Pages: 197 pp (Hardback edition) & 176 pp (Paperback edition)
- ISBN: 0-8147-7490-3 (Hardback edition)
- OCLC: 35990421
- Dewey Decimal: 813/.54 21
- LC Class: PS3568.A579 B94 1997

Bye-Bye is the first novel by Jane Ransom, for which she won the 1996 New York University Press Prize for Fiction. It was published by the New York University Press.

== Plot ==
The bisexual, nameless narrator decides to abandon her life with her husband, changing her name and her appearance. The story follows her obsession with Andorgenie, a mysterious performance artist, and her relationships with different men and women, none of whom she really likes.
