= Rachel Anna Haines =

- Born: December 1842; Mason County, Kentucky, U.S.
- Died: May 1912 (aged 69); Portland, Oregon, U.S.
- Occupation: Homesteader
- Known for: Leader of the Boomer movement
- Spouse: David L. Payne (common-law marriage)

Rachel Anna Haines (1842-1912) was an American homesteader and a leader of the Boomer movement to open up the Unassigned Lands of Indian Territory. She was the common-law wife of David L. Payne and is sometimes referred to as the "Mother of Oklahoma."

== Early life ==
Rachel Anna Haines was born in December 1842 in Mason County, Kentucky. During her childhood her family moved to Missouri, Iowa, and Kansas. She met David L. Payne in Doniphan County, Kansas. In 1868, her family moved to Emporia, Kansas and Rachel work as a dressmaker. Once her family had saved up enough money, they moved to California, Washington Territory, and finally settled in Portland, Oregon.

== Boomer movement ==
In 1879, Haines returned to Kansas to join David L. Payne and the Boomer movement. The Boomers sought to open up the Unassigned Lands in Indian Territory (later Oklahoma Territory). In 1879, 1882, and 1884, Haines, Payne and their followers were expelled by the U.S. Army from the Unassigned Lands for illegally attempting to homestead there. During the 1884 attempt she almost shot her arresting officer, but was talked down by Payne. She was with Payne when he died on November 28, 1884, and afterward announced she and Payne had been common law married with intentions to officially wed once they had settled in the Unassigned Lands. She claimed Payne was the father of her son George.

In 1885, she attempted to enter the Unassigned Lands a fourth time and was again expelled. When the lands were opened in the Land Run of 1889, Haines staked a claim and began to homestead, but her claim was challenged after it was alleged she staked it early. Her homestead was cancelled in November 1894.

== Later life and death ==
Haines returned to the Pacific Northwest after the loss of her homestead. When the state of Oklahoma later requested to move David L. Payne's body from Kansas to be interred in a monument in Oklahoma she refused to consent unless her homestead was returned. By that point, her former homestead had been split up and was part of Oklahoma City. For her role in advocating the settlement of Oklahoma, she is sometimes known as the "Mother of Oklahoma." She died in Portland, Oregon in May 1912.
