= Land Rush of 1889 =

1889 land run in Oklahoma, US

Oklahoma Land Rush of 1889
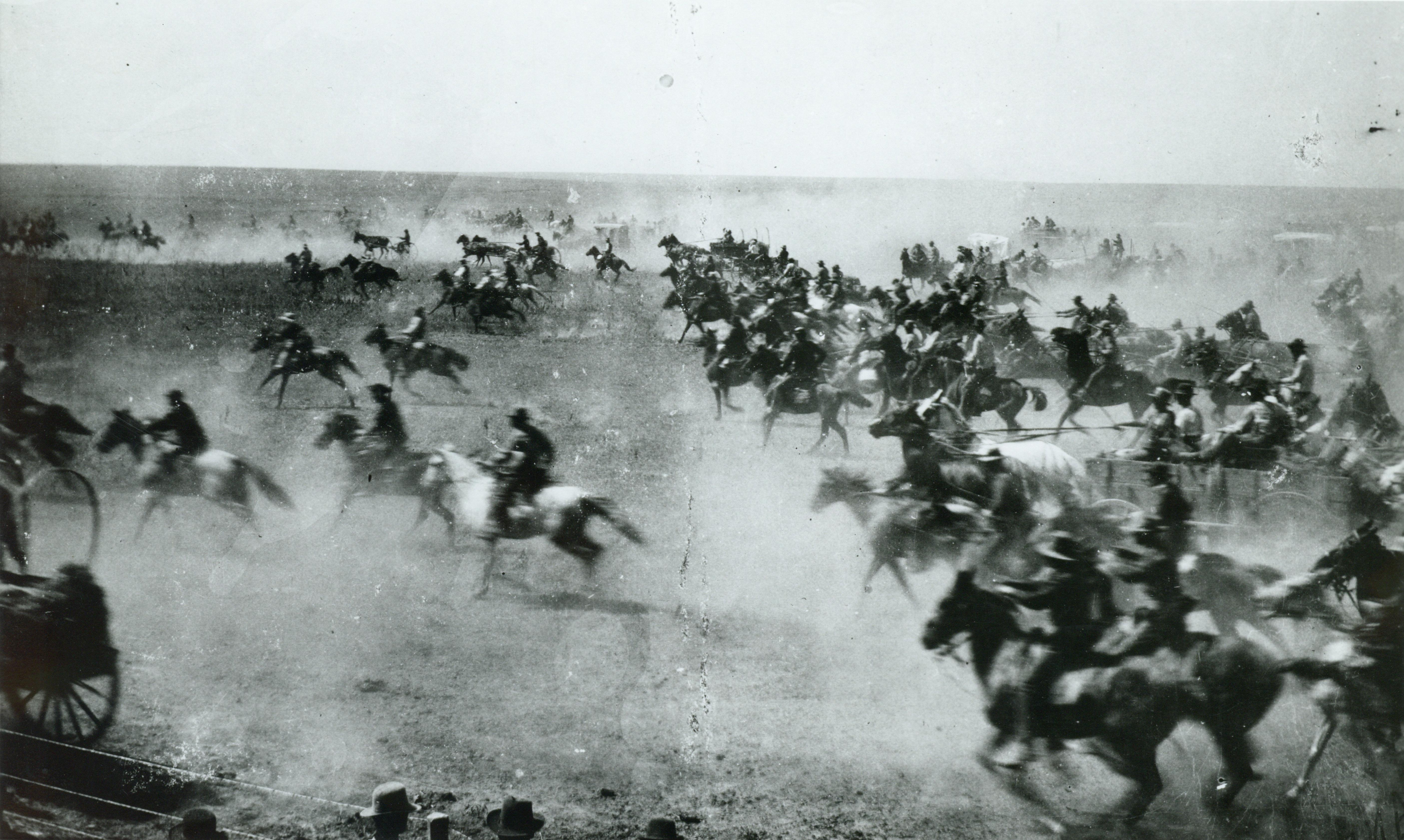
- The land rush in progress
- Date: April 22, 1889
- Location: Central Oklahoma
- Also known as: Oklahoma Land Rush

The Land Rush of 1889 was the first land run into the Unassigned Lands of the former western portion of the federal Indian Territory, which had decades earlier since the 1830s been assigned to the Creek and Seminole native peoples. The area that was opened to settlement included all or part of the Canadian, Cleveland, Kingfisher, Logan, Oklahoma, and Payne counties of the present-day U.S. state of Oklahoma. The land run started at high noon (12:00 pm) on April 22, 1889. An estimated 50,000 people were lined up at the start, seeking to gain a piece of the available two million acres (8,100 km^{2}).

The Unassigned Lands were considered some of the best unoccupied public land in the United States. The Indian Appropriations Act of 1889 was passed and signed into law with an amendment by congressman William McKendree Springer that authorized 23rd president Benjamin Harrison to open the two million acres (8,100 km^{2}) of the western portion of the remaining Indian Territory (established in 1834 with a much greater allotment set aside for the southeastern native tribes of extensive lands of the previous Louisiana Purchase of 1803, west of the Mississippi River), during the administration of 7th president Andrew Jackson (1767-1845, served 1829-1837).

The additional land opening being authorized by Congress also included the adjacent western Unassigned Lands for settlement. A quarter-century earlier, the 16th president Abraham Lincoln (1809-1865, served 1861-1865), had earlier signed the famous Homestead Act of 1862 during the American Civil War which allowed settlers to claim lots of up to 160 acres (0.65 km^{2}), provided that they lived on the land and improved it for several years.

== Overview ==
During the mid-19th century, the time when the American Civil War was at its peak, President Abraham Lincoln developed a strategy to increase land ownership and development by signing the Homestead Acts into law. It was intended to open western lands to allow people to settle on what the government considered to be "idle" tracts of land. The majority of occupants in Indian Territory (which became most of present-day Oklahoma) belonged to the so-called Five Civilized Tribes: the Cherokee, Chickasaw, Choctaw, Muscogee, and Seminole, who had been forcibly removed in the 1830s from their traditional territories in the Southeast.

The government passed an Act called the Dawes Severality (or Dawes Act) in 1887 that aimed to extinguish communal tribal holdings. It proposed that the tribes' communal lands be allocated to heads of households by 160-acre plots, to encourage them to adopt subsistence farming. A stated aim of the Act was to enhance assimilation of tribal members to mainstream European-American practices. It markedly reduced the amount of land owned by the tribes, because the government declared as 'surplus' any lands left over after distribution, and made them available for sale to non-Native Americans. The settlers were also allowed to take up the subdivided land in many places. However, the Dawes Act was not enforced on the five tribes that were considered civilized since they were later exempted. The exemption was to take effect until the year 1902, when the household heads of the five “civilized” tribes were to take 160-acre plots.

After the Civil War, the other Indian tribes that had been relocated to the Territory had been assigned approximately one half of the total landmass occupied by the five tribes. The five tribes had allied with the Confederacy and were forced to give up some of the Indian lands. On April 22, 1889, the day that the government had set aside for the settlement, the crowd in the Oklahoma settlement land was overwhelming. When the signal for the process of land registration was raised, thousands of people rushed across the border as the Oklahoma land rush began. Approximately fifty thousand people; young and old, men and women rushed to try their luck in acquiring the 12,000 land tracts that were available.

== Native American tribes in Indian Territory ==
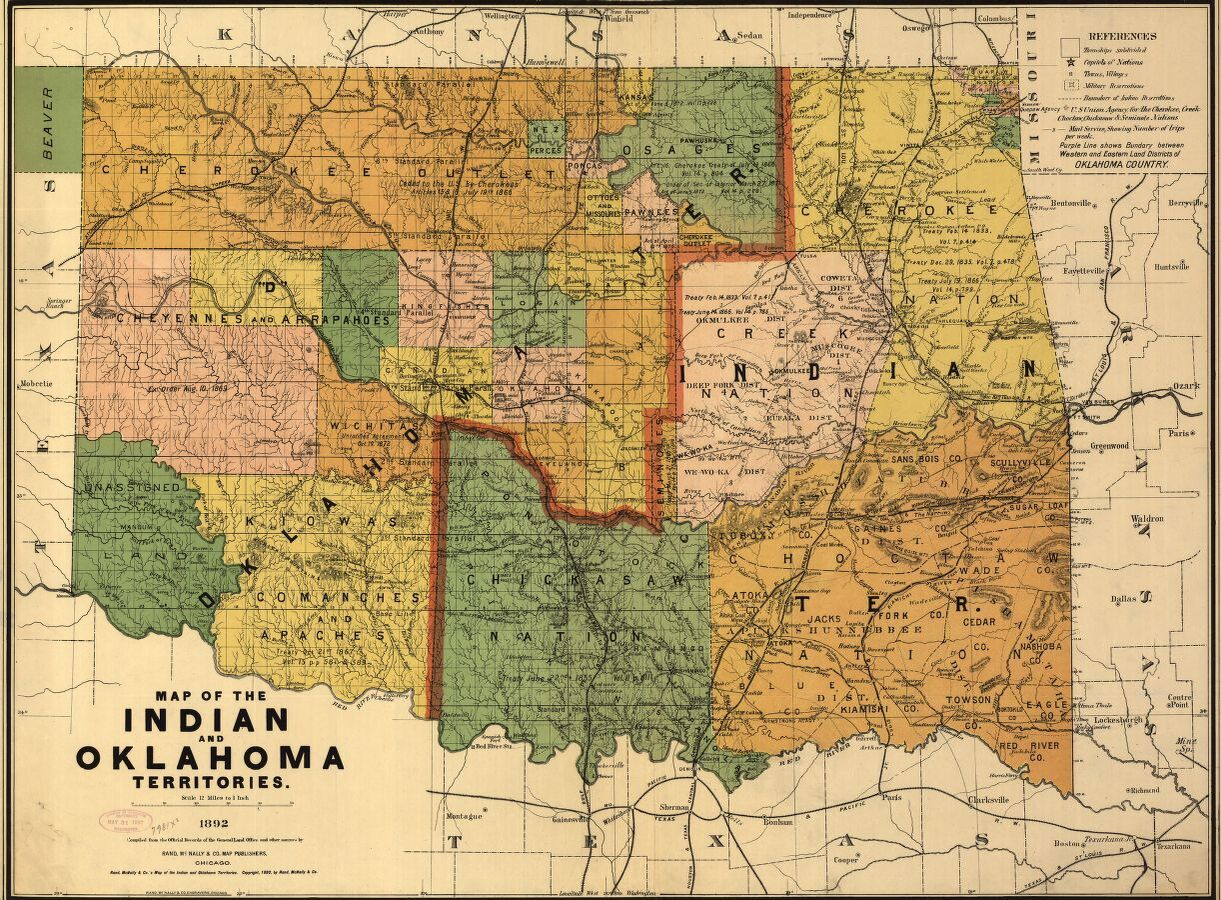
Map of Oklahoma 1892

The removal of Native Americans to Indian Territory started after the election of Andrew Jackson to the presidency in 1828. He believed that Indian Removal from the Southeast was needed to extinguish Native American land claims and enable development by European Americans in Georgia, Alabama, and Mississippi, which still had numerous Native Americans occupying their territories. President Jackson signed the Indian Removal Act on May 28, 1830.

=== Choctaw ===
The Choctaw were the first tribe to concede to removal in 1830. They agreed to give up their land and move to the designated Indian Territory. The main portions of the Choctaw tribe moved to Indian Territory from 1830 to 1833, with the promise that they would be granted autonomy and receive annuities to aid in resettlement. Many died on the long journey to the new territory.

=== Creek ===
The Creek were the next tribe to move to Indian Territory. In 1829 they had held a council, agreeing that they would submit to state laws in order to stay on their lands. But, continued pressure from settlers and the state government resulted in the Creek ceding most of its lands in what became Alabama to the United States. By 1836, the entire Creek Tribe had been removed to Indian Territory. They had suffered armed conflict with settlers and effectively a civil war within the bands of the tribe.

=== Cherokee ===
The Cherokee were the third tribe to be removed to Indian Territory. Tribal leaders Chief John Ross, and other high-ranking families worked to keep their lands, challenging Georgia state actions against them. They were upheld by the US Supreme Court in Worcester v. Georgia, which said that Georgia had no authority over them. But President Jackson refused to enforce the ruling that recognized the Cherokee Nation as a community with its own boundaries, and that Georgia residents could not enter their lands without consent of the Cherokee. Chief John Ross believed that removal was inevitable and worked to gain the best deal possible from the federal government. Opponents gained a new treaty, but by the end of the 1830s, most of the tribe was forced to remove to Indian Territory, accompanied by US military forces. By the end of 1838, most of the Cherokee tribe had been fully removed from the Southeast. Those who remained became state and federal citizens without tribal standing. Of the 18,000 who traveled west from 1835 to 1838, about 4,000 died on what became known as the Trail of Tears.

=== Chickasaw ===
The Chickasaw elected to leave their lands freely and did not suffer like the Cherokee tribe. The tribe had adopted some European-American practices: gaining some formal education for their children, building churches, and farming. They struggled with encroachment by the state government of Mississippi. Beginning in 1832 they signed a collection of treaties with the US, and gained some better terms than the other tribes. They left for Indian Territory in the winter of 1837–38 and paid the Choctaw to be able to settle on some of their lands.

=== Seminole ===
The Seminole Tribe was tricked into signing a removal treaty and the Seminole War is what followed. This was the bloodiest and costliest Indian war in United States history. Chief Osceola and his tribe hid in the Everglades in Florida, where the military sought to hunt them down. Many were captured and sent to Indian Territory in chains. Osceola surrendered and died in prison. The war and removal reduced their population by 40%. The Seminole in the Everglades never surrendered and their descendants today comprise two federally recognized tribes in the state. According to the 1859 census, 2,254 Seminole remained in Florida.

=== Plains tribes in the territory ===
The US also relocated tribes here from the upper Midwest. After the Indian Wars on the Great Plains, the US also relocated some western tribes to Indian Territory. The Quapaw and Seneca were placed in Northeast Oklahoma with the Cherokee. By 1845 they were joined by the Shawnee, Lenape, and Kickapoo.

After Texas was admitted into the Union in 1846, the US forced removal of the Caddo, Kiowa, and parts of the Comanche tribes in Indian Territory. By 1880, the Wyandot, Cheyenne, Arapaho, Wichita, and other smaller tribes had been removed from surrounding states and reassigned to Indian Territory.

== Start of the Boomer Movement ==
With the end of the Civil War, land hungry people sought land in the West. White Americans pressed their legislators to open the Indian Territory. Certain Native Americans like Elias C. Boudinot encouraged other Native Americans to participate in the effort to welcome westward expansion. From 1870 to 1879, thirty-three bills were introduced in Congress to open the territory for settlement.

Legislation was passed by Congress in 1866 that permitted railroads to be laid in sections of 40 miles (64 km) on either sides of the Indian Territory. The two companies in charge of creating these railroads were the Atlantic and Pacific (A&P). Their contracts were eventually rescinded due to not finishing the projects in the agreed time. Railroad companies that came after them took it as their responsibility to finish the project, and saw a way to strengthen their contracts by introducing the movement of settlement in the Indian Territory. The railroads employed people such as C. C. Carpenter to spread false information in newspapers of the Indian Territory being open to settlement through Congress's Homestead Acts. Both black and white migrants began to move to the Oklahoma Territory. President Rutherford B. Hayes warned these early agitators for settlement (who came to be known as "boomers" in figurative reference to the loudness of their demands) against moving into the Indian lands. He ordered the military to use force to ensure this.

== Boomers and Sooners ==
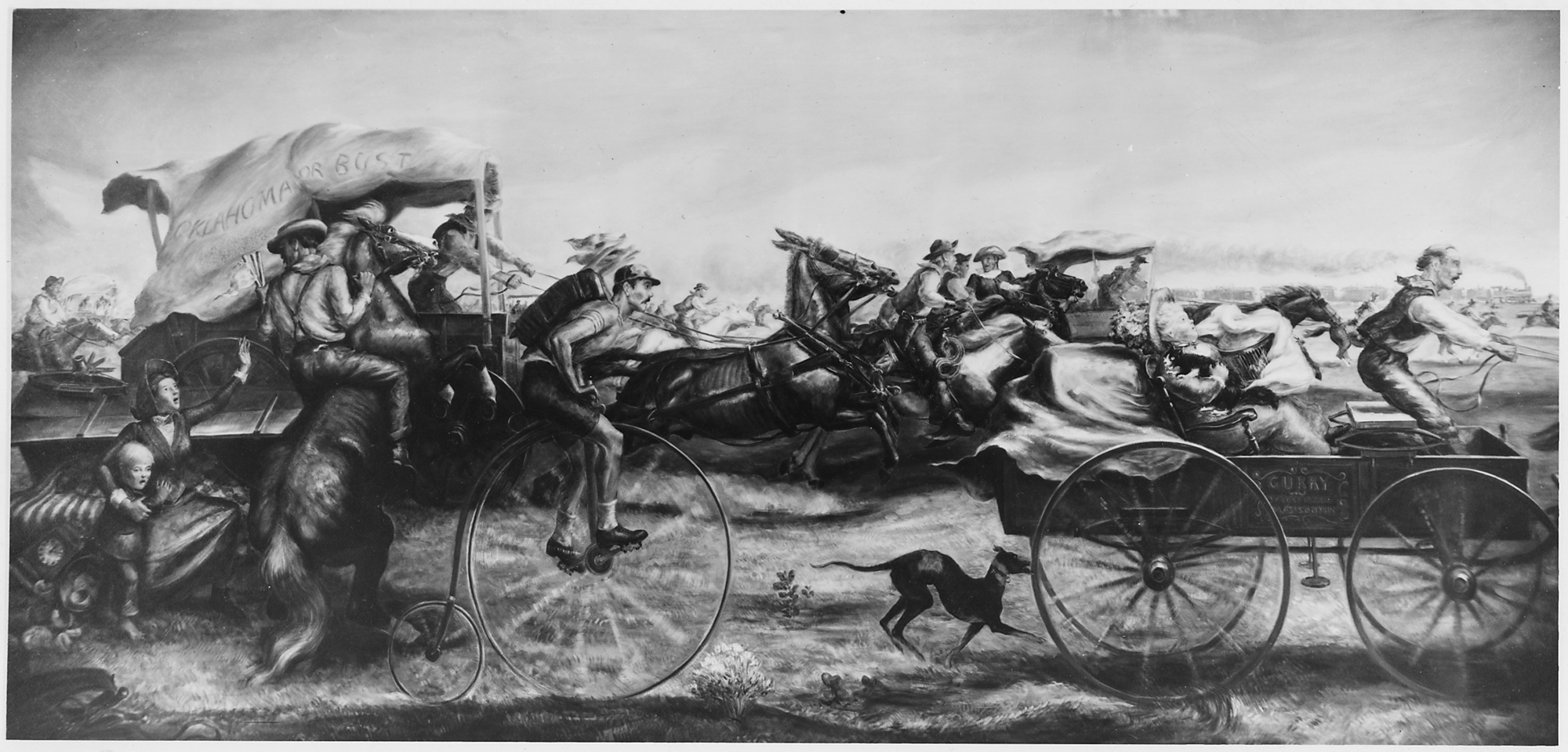
"The Oklahoma Land Rush, April 22, 1889", by John Steuart Curry

A number of the people who participated in the run entered the unoccupied land early and hid there until the legal time of entry to lay quick claim to some of the most choice homesteads. These people came to be identified as "Sooners". This led to hundreds of legal contests that were decided first at local land offices and eventually by the U.S. Department of the Interior. Arguments included what constituted the "legal time of entry". The settlers who entered the territory at the legally appointed time are sometimes known as "boomers", although confusingly, the term also refers to those who campaigned for the opening of the lands, led by David L. Payne. The University of Oklahoma's fight song, "Boomer Sooner", derives from these two names. The school "mascot" is a replica of a 19th-century covered wagon, called the "Sooner Schooner." When the OU football team scores, the Sooner Schooner is pulled across the field by a pair of ponies named "Boomer" and "Sooner.” There are a pair of costumed mascots also named "Boomer" and "Sooner" as well.

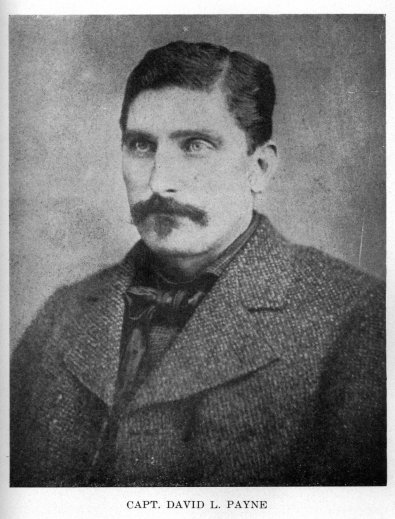
David L. Payne

=== David Payne ===
Captain David L. Payne took advantage of the boomer movement to occupy and create the Oklahoma Territory. He and other enthusiasts created the Oklahoma Colony, allowing settlers to join with the fee of a minimum of one dollar. Then once settled in the Oklahoma Territory they organized themselves as a town-site company that sold lots of land from a range of $2–25 depending on the demand of the Boomer Movement. Cattlemen, afraid that these boomers would take their land, worked alongside the military to keep them out. Settlers thought it their right to occupy the lands as they had purchased it with cash and by doing so, their title was invested in the U.S. government. Even so, the military was at constant work to arrest the boomers unlawfully on Indian Territory, although they were generally released without having to go to trial.

On November 28, 1884, Payne met his end at a hotel in Kansas due to poison found in his glass of milk. It is speculated that it was organized by cattlemen unhappy with the success of the Boomer Movement.

=== William Couch ===
William Couch was a former lieutenant under Payne. He did not possess the brash personality of his predecessor, but, he had a kindred personality and spoke with strength. He rigorously studied all treaties, court cases, and laws regarding the Oklahoma land issue in order to present logical and concise boomer claims. He had led unsuccessful movements into Indian Territory, but under military and legal pressure the Oklahoma movement stagnated. It was rebooted with the construction of the Santa Fe Railroad line across the middle of Indian Territory from Arkansas City, Kansas, to Gainesville, Texas. Certain that the lands would be opened to settlement shortly after the construction of the railroad was completed in the spring of 1887, the Oklahoma movement again slowed down.

By December 1887 the inaction of Congress reignited the movement behind Couch's leadership. After a conference of boomers was held in Kansas, the conference sent delegates Sydney Clarke, Samuel Crocker, and Couch to Washington to promote the passage of an act to open Oklahoma lands for settlement. After Couch and company presented the bill to Congress, it faced opposition from state representatives George T. Barnes of Georgia, Charles E. Hooker of Mississippi, and Colonel G.W. Harkins of the Chickasaw Nation. They opposed it because the U.S. government had promised the land to the Indian Nations living there and the government did not have the right to open up land in the territory to settlement.

The Springer Oklahoma Bill, which was proposed by Illinois representative William M. Springer, was meant to use the Homestead Act to open the lands for settlement. Arguments over the payment for the lands continued until the legislative session ended and the bill was not passed. In December, Couch presented the Springer Oklahoma Bill to Congress again, which led to the passage of the Indian Appropriation Bill. With this bill, Congress paid $1,912,952.02 to the Seminole and Creek Nations in exchange for 2,370,414.62 acres of unassigned land. A section giving the president the authority to open the land to settlement was added.

=== African-Americans ===
African Americans had been trying to find communities they could settle without the worries of racism against them. When the Land Rush took place, black families had been building their own way of life and culture since the Reconstruction era. Even in the Oklahoma Territory, the five main Native American Tribes had to sign agreements with the US government that they would no longer practice slavery, and if they continued, they would be exempted from their land by the United States.

During the Land Rush, it was a growing belief within the African American community that this opening of free land was their opportunity to create communities of their very own, without the influence of racism. Their intentions were to make Oklahoma a state just for them. One organization that took advantage of this movement was the Oklahoma Immigration Organization owned by W. L. Eagleson. Eagleson spread the announcement of recolonization to the black community throughout the United States, especially focused in the South.

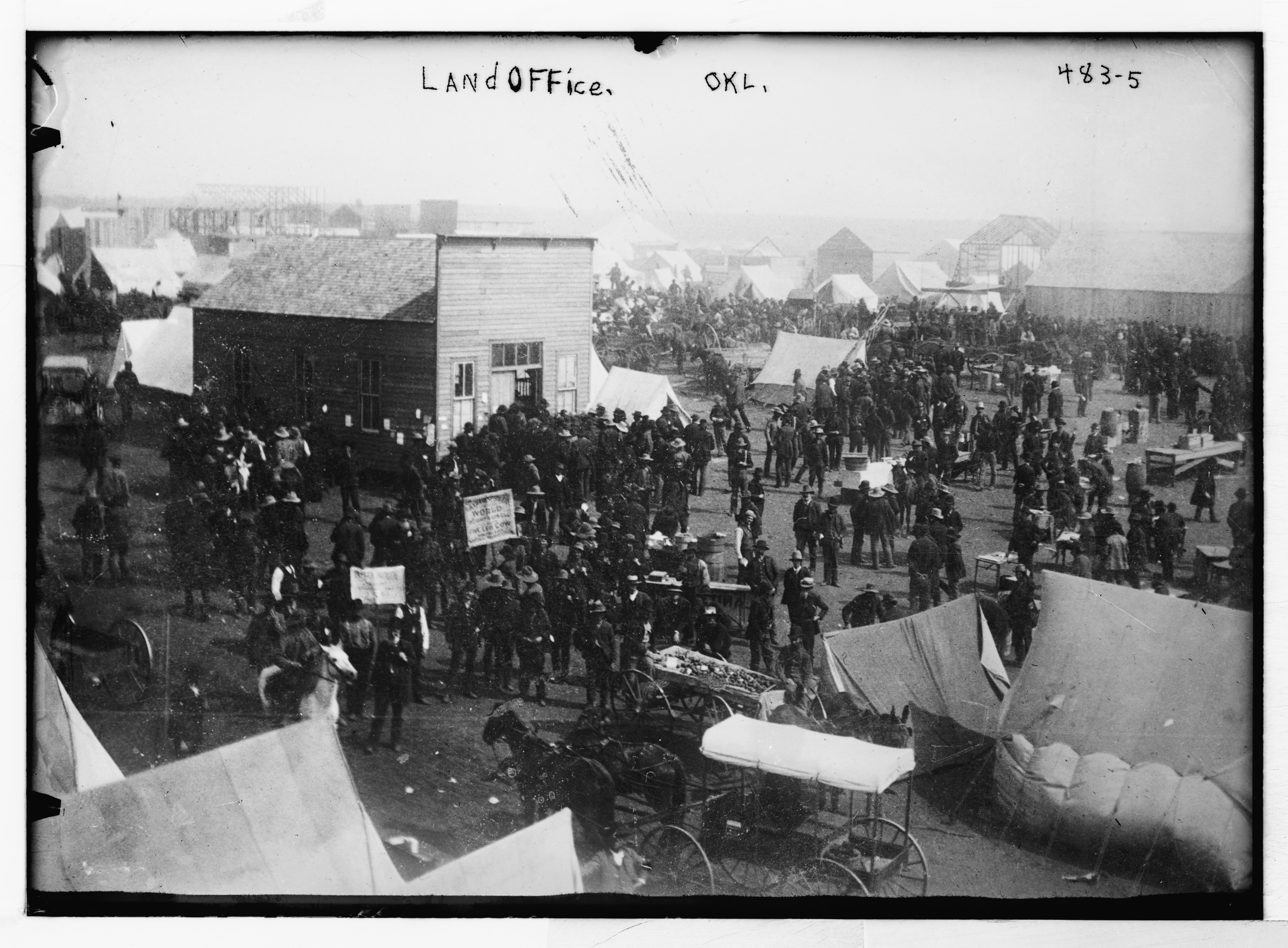
U.S. land office after the Land Rush of 1889.

One attempt to make Oklahoma a black state was to appoint Edward Preston McCabe as the governor of the Oklahoma Territory. This would make it easier for black families to settle within the region during the land rush. This plan failed, as there seemed to be less and less excitement of immigrating to the new land, and instead McCabe had to settle to being a treasurer in Logan County of Oklahoma.

The attempts of people like Eagleson and McCabe were not completely futile as their support of the black family did enthuse many to continue to move to the Oklahoma Territory. These movements did become townships, such as Kingfisher.

== Rush for land ==
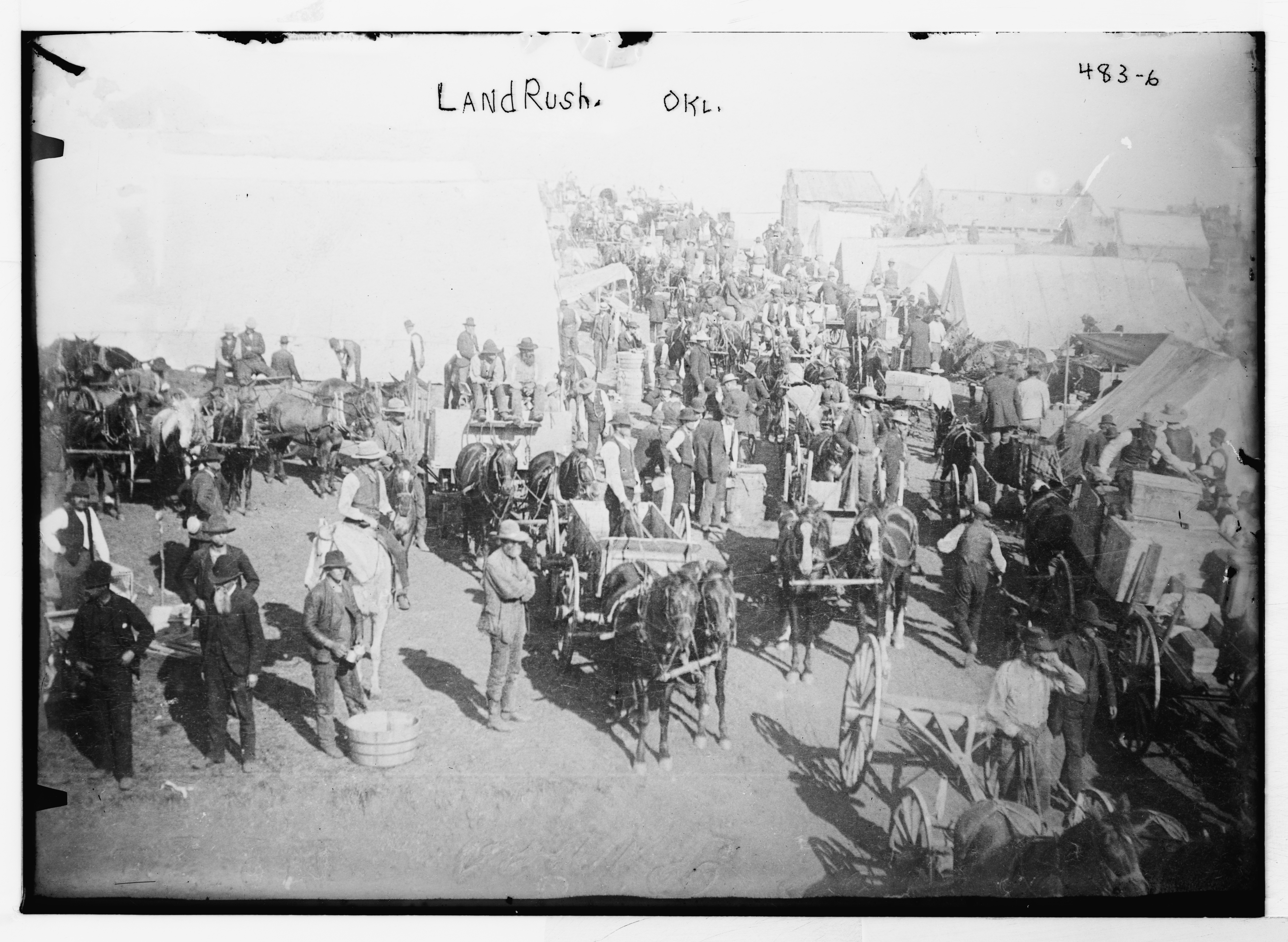
Settlers waiting to stake their claims on the unassigned lands.

After the passage of the Indian Appropriation Bill, President Benjamin Harrison made the declaration that on April 22, 1889, at 12 o'clock noon that the Unassigned Land in Indian Territory would be open for settlement. At the time of the opening, which was indicated by gunshot, the line of people on horse and in wagons dispersed into a kaleidoscope of motion and dust and oxen and wagons. The chase for land was frenzied and much chaos and disorder ensued. The rush did not last long, and by the end of the day nearly two million acres of land had been claimed. By the end of the year, 62,000 settlers lived in the Unassigned Lands located between the Five Tribes on the east and the Plains Tribes on the west.

== Rapid growth ==
By the end of the day (April 22, 1889), both Oklahoma City and Guthrie had become cities of around 10,000 people each. As Harper's Weekly reported:

At twelve o'clock on Monday, April 22d, the resident population of Guthrie was nothing; before sundown it was at least ten thousand. In that time streets had been laid out, town lots staked off, and steps taken toward the formation of a municipal government.

Many settlers immediately started improving their new land or stood in line waiting to file their claims. Children sold creek water to homesteaders waiting in line for five cents a cup, while other children gathered buffalo dung to provide fuel for cooking. By the second week, new settlers had opened schools; children were taught by volunteers paid by pupils' parents until regular school districts could be established. Within one month, Oklahoma City had five banks and six newspapers.

On May 2, 1890, the Oklahoma Organic Act was passed creating the Oklahoma Territory. This act included the Panhandle of Oklahoma within the territory. It also allowed for central governments and designated Guthrie as the territory's capital.

=== Expansion of cities ===
With the signal of troops to cross into the territory, over a dozen Santa Fe trains pulled into Oklahoma Territory, but most migrants traveled on horseback, in wagons, and on foot. Establishing a claim involved placing a stake with the claimant's name and place of entry at a U.S. land, one of which was located in Guthrie and the other in Kingfisher. The settler had to live on the claimed section of land for a five-year period and visibly improve it (including with buildings) before they could attain the title to the property. That period could be shortened to fourteen months if the settler paid a price of $1.25 per acre.

Guthrie, Oklahoma City, Kingfisher, El Reno, Norman, and Stillwater were six of the townsites established in 1889. They were designated as county seats. Guthrie was named capital of the Territory and later was capital of the state of Oklahoma for a brief period.

Oklahoma City was designated as the permanent capital of the state. On April 23, Oklahoma City contained more than 12,000 people. Within an hour of land being opened, 2,500 settlers occupied lands in a township that they initially named Lisbon, but would later be called Kingfisher.

== In popular culture ==
- Hollywood has produced motion pictures illustrating the Oklahoma Land Run of 1889 and pioneer life on the land claims. Two of these, both named Cimarron, were based upon the 1929 novel of the same name by Edna Ferber:
  - Cimarron (1931): directed by Wesley Ruggles; cast includes Richard Dix, Irene Dunne, and Estelle Taylor. It was an Academy Award Winner for Best Art Direction, Best Picture, Best Writing and Adaptation.
  - Cimarron (1960): directed by Anthony Mann and Charles Walters; cast includes Glenn Ford, Maria Schell, and Anne Baxter.
- The Oklahoma City 89ers was the original name for the Oklahoma City Triple-A Minor League Baseball from 1962 to 1997, when the team played at the now-demolished All Sports Stadium at the state fairgrounds. The team is known now as the Oklahoma City Comets. Among the most notable players for the 89ers were Juan González, National Baseball Hall of Fame inductee Ryne Sandberg, Rubén Sierra and Sammy Sosa.
- The drama film Far and Away (1992), starring Tom Cruise and Nicole Kidman, depicts a young Irish couple immigrating to the States with hopes of participating in the Cherokee Outlet (or Strip) land run (1893 just north of the Unassigned Lands) and staking claim to their own land.
- The Rush is the central theme of the comic album Ruée sur l'Oklahoma, the 14th album of the Belgian comics series Lucky Luke.

== See also ==
- Benjamin Harrison
- Nannita Daisey, claimed to be the first woman to file a claim on Oklahoma land
- Boomers (Oklahoma settlers)
