= Charles C. Carpenter (settler) =

- Occupations: Jayhawker, Union officer in the American Civil War, Oklahoma Boomer

Charles C. Carpenter (fl. 19th century) was a Boomer leader who organized and instigated the first unauthorized attempt to homestead the Unassigned Lands in Oklahoma Territory in May 1879.

== Pre-Boomer life ==
According to official U.S. Civil War documents, Carpenter was born in Ohio, was a Jayhawker before the American Civil War, and had served as a scout and spy for Major General John C. Frémont during his command of the Army's Department of the West from May to November 1861. Later in the war, he commanded the Jessie Scouts, an irregular organization named for Frémont's wife, Jessie Benton Frémont, daughter of Missouri senator Thomas Hart Benton. Of his service in the scouts, Union Army Capt. William McMichael in a letter to General Ulysses S. Grant dated January 10, 1862 wrote that Carpenter was "admirably adapted for the dangerous services in which he engages. During the times that General Fremont was in command, he several times performed such services as clearly indicated that he adds great shrewdness to the reckless courage which he undoubtedly possesses." He also represented himself at times to be an officer of the U.S. Detective Police force. All of his service claims cannot be proved, but certainly suggest he was a man of significant ability, if somewhat flamboyant in style. In 1876, Carpenter had led an effort to settle Americans in the Black Hills of South Dakota, where settlement on Native American lands had also been forbidden by the federal government, an experience which may have influenced him to take up the Boomer cause.

== Boomer leader ==
During his leadership of the Boomer effort, Carpenter was described as a striking character who affected long Custer-like hair and fringed buckskin, and was characterized as either "a scalawag of the worst type, a burly, swaggering, reckless character" or as a Moses leading his people to the Promised Land, depending on whether the describer agreed with his politics, or not. In the media of the day, he was sometimes styled "Colonel" Carpenter and "General" Carpenter, but no source of a military rank other than his rank of Captain during his Civil War service has been documented.

In late April 1879, Carpenter and his wife traveled from Kansas City, Kansas to Independence, Kansas to set up a headquarters for organizing the potential settlers and soliciting donations from town merchants to support the effort. Carpenter issued a statement announcing that "All parties and colonists wishing to join my expedition to the Indian Territory will concentrate at Independence, Kansas, between May 5th and 7th," from which location he instructed the Boomers to move into Oklahoma and rendezvous at his general headquarters at Carpenter's City, eighteen miles west of the Sac and Fox Nation Agency, "where the general headquarters of the Governor of the Territory will be established," implying that he was to be the future governor.

A poster printed advertising the rush advised parties accompanying Carpenter's colony to purchase their outfits at Independence, Kansas, adding that "parties will have no trouble in getting transportation at Independence for hauling their goods into the Territory."

When the Boomers set out for the Unassigned Lands, Carpenter remained in Montgomery County, Kansas, where Inspector John McNeil of the U.S. Indian Service was sent to order him to cease his activities. When confronted by McNeil, Carpenter ceased his support of the Boomers and left the border area, effectively ceding leadership of the Boomers to David L. Payne.

Carpenter's Boomers established a nominal settlement called City of Oklahoma on Deep Fork River (Deep Fork of the North Canadian River). The creek where they camped, in present Payne County, Oklahoma, was given the name "Boomer Creek."

Anticipating the Boomers' move, U.S. President Rutherford B. Hayes had issued a proclamation on April 26, 1879 forbidding homestead entry of the Oklahoma lands. U.S. Army troops from Fort Reno were sent to eject the Boomers and destroy their improvements, ending the first major Boomer episode.
