= Oklahoma Organic Act =

Statute used by the United States Congress

- Other short titles: Organic Act Oklahoma
- Long title: An Act to provide a temporary government for the Territory of Oklahoma, to enlarge the jurisdiction of the United States Court in the Indian Territory and for other purposes.
- Nicknames: Oklahoma Organic Act of 1890
- Enacted by: the 51st United States Congress
- Effective: May 2, 1890

Citations
- Public law: 51-182
- Statutes at Large: 26 Stat. 81

Legislative history
- Introduced in the Senate as S. 895 by Orville H. Platt (R–CT) on February 4, 1890; Passed the Senate on February 13, 1890 (27-16); Passed the House on March 3, 1890 (154-96, in lieu of H.R. 6786); Reported by the joint conference committee on April 20, 1890; agreed to by the House on April 21, 1890 (Agreed) and by the Senate on April 23, 1890 (50-5); Signed into law by President Benjamin Harrison on May 2, 1890

An Organic Act is a generic name for a statute used by the United States Congress to describe a territory, in anticipation of being admitted to the Union as a state. Because of Oklahoma's unique history (much of the state was a place where aboriginal natives have always lived and after forced removal many other tribes were relocated here) an explanation of the Oklahoma Organic Act needs a historic perspective. In general, the Oklahoma Organic Act may be viewed as one of a series of legislative acts, from the time of Reconstruction, enacted by Congress in preparation for the creation of a united State of Oklahoma. The Organic Act created Oklahoma Territory, and Indian Territory that were Organized incorporated territories of the United States out of the old "unorganized" Indian Territory. The Oklahoma Organic Act was one of several acts whose intent was the assimilation of the tribes in Oklahoma and Indian Territories through the elimination of tribes' communal ownership of property.

== History ==
=== Indian Relocation ===
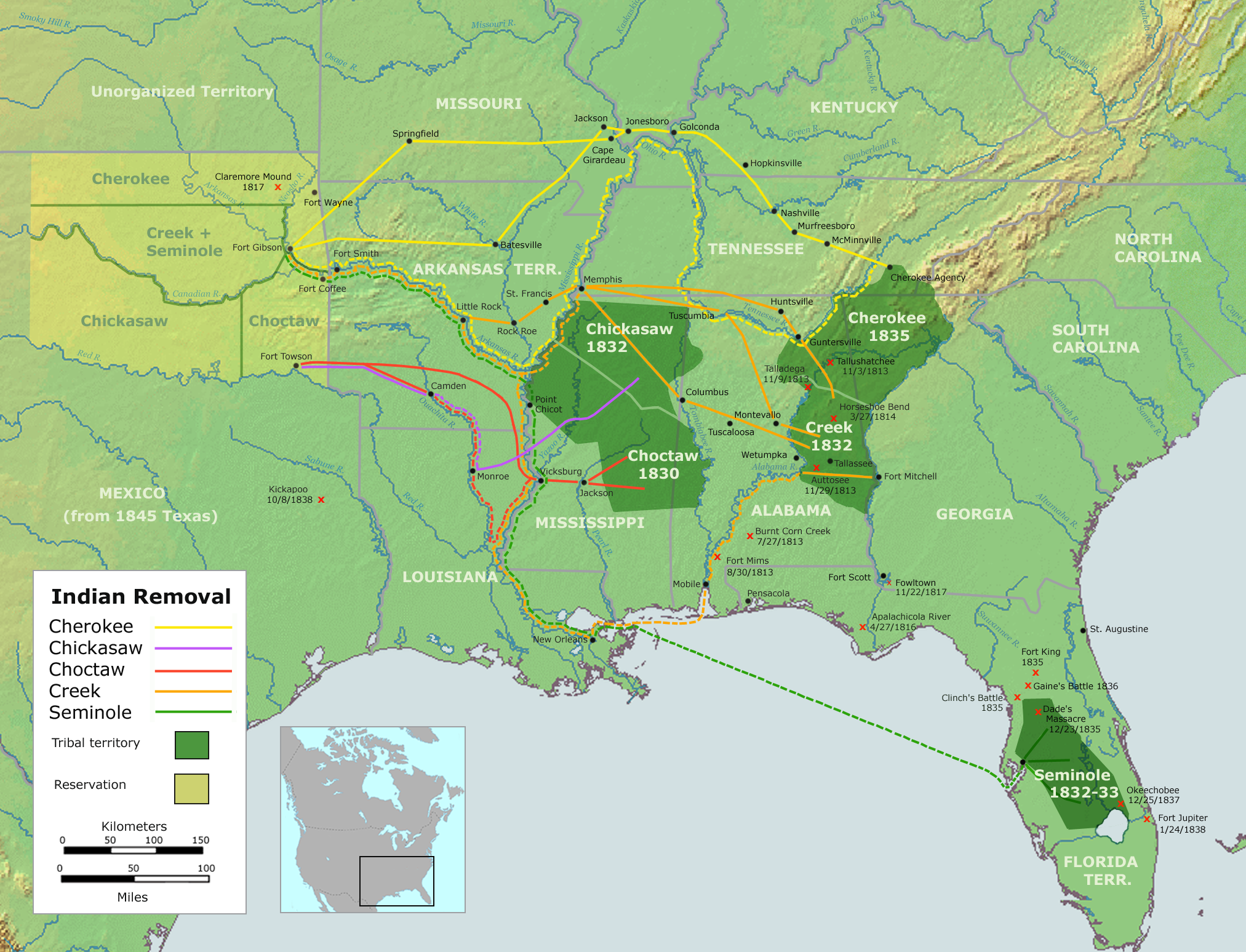
Routes of southern removals to the first Indian Territory of the Five Civilized Tribes.

"Indian removal" was a nineteenth-century policy of the US Government to relocate aboriginal natives living east of the Mississippi River to lands west of the river.

The Indian Removal Act, a specific implementation of the Removal Policy, was signed by President Andrew Jackson on May 28, 1830. The Act transformed most of the current state of Oklahoma into an Indian Territory, where southern aboriginal natives (Cherokee, Chickasaw, Choctaw, Creek and Seminole, also called the Five Civilized Tribes) were relocated. The Trail of Tears is a name given to the forced relocation of the Choctaw Nation in 1831.

In 1834, Congress created the first Indian Territory, with the Five Civilized Tribes occupying the land that became the State of Oklahoma, excluding its panhandle.

=== Civil War ===
See: Indian Territory in the American Civil War

Several members of the Five Civilized Tribes owned slaves and had sympathies with the Confederacy. All of the Five Civilized Tribes signed treaties placing themselves "under the protection of the Confederate States of America".

During the Civil War, Congress passed a statute concerning the Abrogation of treaties with Indian Tribes, (codified at 25 USC Sec. 72) which states:

Whenever the tribal organization of any Indian tribe is in actual hostility to the United States, the President is authorized, by proclamation, to declare all treaties with such tribe abrogated by such tribe if in his opinion the same can be done consistently with good faith and legal and national obligations.

=== Reconstruction ===
As part of the Reconstruction effort following the Civil War, a "Southern Treaty Commission" was formed to meet with Indian tribes to negotiate new treaties. A result of these "Reconstruction Treaties" with various tribes was that the land allocated to the Five Civilized tribes was reduced to the eastern part of the territory, making room for relocation of other Indian tribes. Later, other aboriginal people, such as the Apache, Comanche, Delaware, Kiowa, Cheyenne and Arapaho Tribes and the Osage Nation were also forced to relocate to the Territories (there are currently 38 federally recognized tribes in Oklahoma).

==== Treaty of Washington (1866) ====
The Southern Treaty Commission formulated the 1866 Treaty of Washington with the Choctaw and Chickasaw Nations which contained the following provisions:

- Abolished slavery
- agreed to legislation that Congress and the President "may deem necessary for the better administration of justice and the protection of the rights of person and property within the Indian territory.".
- Choctaw and Chickasaw tribes received $300,000, selling tribal lands west of 98 west longitude to the United States
- General amnesty for siding with Confederate States of America
- Tribes grant right of way for rail roads authorized by Congress; A Land patent, or "first-title deed" to alternate sections of land adjacent to rail roads would be granted to the rail road upon completion of each 20 mile section of track and water stations
- Agree to participate in the Indian Territory Legislature, with proportional representation from all tribes over 500 members
  - Laws take effect unless suspended by Secretary of the Interior or President of the United States
  - No laws shall be inconsistent with the US Constitution, or laws of Congress, or treaties of the US
  - No legislation regarding "matters pertaining to the legislative, judicial, or other organization, laws, or customs of the several tribes or nations, except as herein provided for"
  - Superintendent of Indian Affairs (or appointee) is the presiding officer
  - Secretary of Interior appoints secretary
  - "The Choctaws and Chickasaws also agree that a court or courts may be established in said Territory with such jurisdiction and organization as Congress may prescribe: Provided, That the same shall not interfere with the local judiciary of either of said nations."
- Within each county, a quarter section of land shall be held in trust for the establishment of seats of justice therein, and also as many quarter-sections as the said legislative councils may deem proper for the permanent endowment of schools
- Provides for each man, woman, and child to receive 160 acres of land as an allotment.
- A Land patent, or "first-title deed" shall be issued as evidence of allotment, "issued by the President of the United States, and countersigned by the chief executive officer of the nation in which the land lies"
- All treaties and parts of treaties inconsistent herewith be, and the same are hereby, declared null and void.

==== Osage Nation Purchase of Land in Cherokee Outlet ====
Under the Cherokee Reconstruction Treaty of 1866, the Osage Nation began the process of purchasing approximately 1,570,059 acres in the Cherokee Outlet from the Cherokee Nation. The Osage Reservation was part of Oklahoma Territory under the Oklahoma Organic Act of 1890 and was made a semiautonomous district by the Enabling Act of 1906. With the passage of the Osage Allotment Act of June 28, 1906 (34 Stat. 539 c. 3572), each member of the tribe received an average allotment of 659.51 acres, with no surplus land remaining and the tribe retained ownership of mineral under the land (held in trust by the US Government).

==== Committee on Territories ====
The United States House Committee on Territories was initially formed in 1825. Shortly after the Civil War, the Committee began discussing how best to assimilate the Five Civilized Tribes and how to combine Indian Territory and Oklahoma Territory. It was decided that one component of assimilation would be the distribution of property held in-common by the tribe to individual members of the tribe.

A second component of this decision was that in 1871, Congress decided that the United States would no longer deal with Indian tribes through a formal treaty-making process, providing that "[n]o Indian nation or tribe within the territory of the United States shall be acknowledged or recognized as an independent nation ...".

From the 1870s through the early 1900s, the Committee on Territories heard arguments from the Five Civilized Tribes that the lands within their territory should not be included within the State of Oklahoma and that a separate State of Sequoyah should be created for the Tribes.

==== Indian Appropriations Act of 1889 ====
The Cherokee Commission, created by Section 14 of the Indian Appropriations Act of March 2, 1889, was empowered to acquire land in the Cherokee Outlet not occupied by tribes, and to acquire excess land of other tribes in the Oklahoma Territory for non-indigenous homesteading. Eleven agreements involving nineteen tribes were signed over the period of May 1890 through November 1892. Investigations for Commission irregularities continued through the end of the 20th Century.

The 1889 Act also opened the Unassigned Lands to homesteaders, which included the Land Run of 1889 that settled Oklahoma City, Oklahoma.

== Contents of Organic Act - Oklahoma Territory Established ==
Congress rejected the Five Civilized Tribes' argument for a State of Oklahoma and a separate State of Sequoyah. On May 2, 1890, the Oklahoma Organic Act was passed officially creating Oklahoma Territory, which initially excluded lands occupied by the Five Civilized Tribes, but reorganized the legal system of Indian Territory, providing for a mechanism to consolidate Oklahoma and Indian Territories.

"The purpose of the Organic Act was to begin the process of creating a state and forming a government, while still allowing time to divide the property of the Five Civilized Tribes and transfer the property from communal to individual ownership."

The act also included the "Public Lands" or "No-man's land" in the present-day Oklahoma panhandle. This land had been part of Texas, But was north of the limit for slavery set by the Compromise of 1850 and so had been given up by Texas upon its entry into the union.

=== Components of Oklahoma and Indian Territories ===
In the 1890s both Oklahoma and Indian Territories contained Indian Reservations.

Indian Territory was primarily a consolidation of the Five Civilized Tribes plus an assortment of tribes in the northeast part of the territory, land administered by the Quapaw Indian Agency.

Oklahoma Territory was essentially an amalgamation of what was left over; land unassigned to other territories and states.

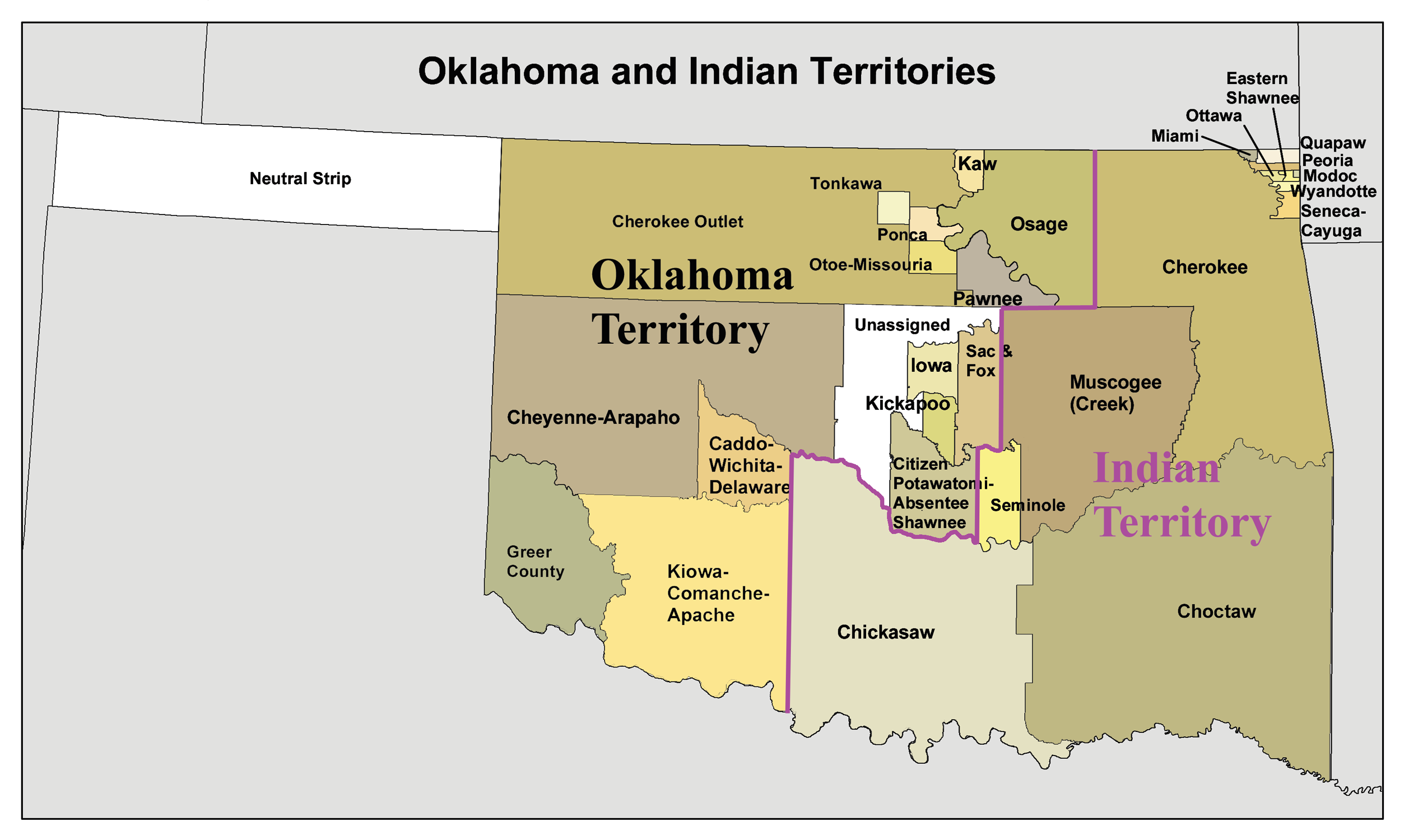
Oklahoma and Indian Territory, 1890s

Major components of what would become the State of Oklahoma include:

- Indian Territory
  - Cherokee Nation
  - Chickasaw Nation
  - Choctaw Nation
  - Muscogee (Creek) Nation
  - Seminole Nation
  - Land administered by the Quapaw Indian Agency
- Oklahoma Territory
  - Cherokee Outlet
  - Osage Nation
  - "Leased lands" of the Chickasaw and Choctaw Nations, west of the ninety-eighth degree of west longitude
  - Ceded lands of the Seminole and Muscogee (Creek) Nations
  - Unassigned Lands
  - Cimarron Territory - the Oklahoma Panhandle
- Disputed land, Greer County, Texas

=== Civil and Criminal Law in Oklahoma and Indian Territories ===
The Oklahoma Organic Act specifically extended civil and criminal Arkansas laws over the Indian Territory. Historically, non-Indians were not allowed in Indian Territory and the Federal Court in Ft. Smith, Arkansas had jurisdiction over Indian Territory. Arkansas recognizes the doctrine of Riparian water rights, based on English common law, and generally accepted in the eastern part of the United States.

For the Oklahoma Territory, the laws of Nebraska were to prevail. Water rights in Oklahoma Territory and the western United States, water rights were generally allocated under the principle of prior appropriation.

Today Oklahoma has a unique set of water rights statues based on groundwater and streamwater. The owner of land owns the groundwater underlying such land and surface water standing on the land, however the Oklahoma Water Resources Board regulates non-domestic use. Stream water is considered to be publicly owned and subject to appropriation by the Oklahoma Water Resources Board.

The organic act created several Federal District Courts, both in the Indian Territory and Oklahoma Territory. The act also preserved Indian court civil authority by stipulating that "and any person residing in the Territory of Oklahoma, in whom there is Indian blood, shall have the right to invoke the aid of courts therein for the protection of his person or property, as though he were a citizen of the United States: Provided, That nothing in this act contained shall be so construed as to give jurisdiction to the courts established in said Territory in controversies arising between Indians of the same tribe, while sustaining their tribal relations"

=== Homestead / Land Use ===
The Oklahoma Organic Act provided for a mechanism for Indian tribes to allocate their communally held land to individual tribal members, and to distribute unallocated property to non-Indians. A Land patent, or "first-title deed" would be granted to both tribal members, who received allotments, and to homesteaders who, after a period of time, claimed and improved (or in some cases purchased for $1.25 per acre) the homestead lands via a Land run.

Two sections in each Oklahoma Territory township were to be reserved, in the form of a Land grant, as public school lands, with money from land leases to be used to pay for public education. Later, the Oklahoma Constitution established the Oklahoma Commissioners of the Land Office to manage this resource.

Section-line roads to provide access to land parcels, were to be maintained on each side of every one-mile-square section throughout the territory. This requirement does not apply to the former Osage Reservation, now Osage County, Oklahoma.

=== US Citizenship ===
Members of an Indian Tribe, who were not already citizens, could apply to become citizens of the United States.

In an effort to entice Indians of Indian Territory to accept their land allotments, it was provided that upon acceptance of an allotment, the Indians were declared to be Citizens of the United States. "Provided, that the Indians who become Citizens of the United States under the provisions of this act do not forfeit or lose any rights or privileges they enjoy or are entitled to as members of the tribe or nation who which they belong."

=== Railroads ===
Existing railroad easements were to remain in effect. Railroads were also given the right to "cross, intersect, join or unite it railroad with any other railroad now constructed or that may hereafter be constructed at any point upon its routes"

=== Powers Reserved to US Government and Tribes ===
"Congress may at any time hereafter change the boundaries of said Territory, or attach any portion of the same to any other State or Territory of the United States without the consent of the inhabitants of the Territory hereby created: Provided, That nothing in this act shall be construed to impair any right now pertaining to any Indians or Indian tribe in said Territory under the laws, agreements, and treaties of the United States, or to impair the rights of person or property pertaining to said Indians, or to affect the authority of the Government of the United States to make any regulation or to make any law respecting said Indians, their lands, property, or other rights which it would have been competent to make or enact if this act had not been passed"

== Dawes Act and Dawes Commission ==
The Dawes Act, (also called "The General Allotment Act") was adopted by Congress in 1887, and authorized a survey of Indian tribal land for the purposes of dividing the land into allotments for individual Indians. Dawes Act was amended in 1891 and again in 1906 by the Burke Act. The General Allotment Act's "goal was to end tribal ownership of land by assimilating Indians as part of an agrarian society." Individual ownership of land was seen as an essential step. The act also provided that the government would purchase Indian land "excess" to that needed for allotment and open it up for settlement by non-Indians.

The Dawes Commission was created by Congress in 1893 as a further attempt to convince the members of tribes to receive their tribal land allotments. Members of the Five Civilized Tribes (Indian Territory) were exempt from the original Dawes Act legislation, and the Dawes Commission was to convince the Five Civilized Tribes to agree to cede tribal title of Indian lands. The commission established procedures for members of Indian tribes in Oklahoma Territory to register with their respective Indian Nations (only one nation if there was mixed ancestry), and procedures to receive land allotments.

The Curtis Act of 1898 amended the Dawes Act, abolishing all tribal courts and gave the United States exclusive jurisdiction over "all controversies growing out of the titles, ownership, occupation, possession, or use of real estate, coal, and asphalt."

== Proposed State of Sequoyah ==
A Constitutional Convention was convened by residents of Indian Territory and proposed to Congress that a State of Sequoyah be admitted to the Union. Charles N. Haskell was selected to represent the Creek Nation at the convention, and later became the first Governor of the State of Oklahoma. William H. Murray, represented the Chickasaw and later became the first Speaker of the Oklahoma House of Representatives after statehood, and was elected the ninth Governor of Oklahoma. The proposal failed to gain acceptance in Washington.

== Five Civilized Tribes Act (April 26, 1906) ==
The Five Civilized Tribes Act of April 26, 1906 can be seen as the final act leading to Oklahoma Statehood. One of the act's purposes was to pave the way "for Oklahoma's admission to the union on an "Equal footing with the original States", conditioned on its disclaimer of all right and title to lands "owned or held by any Indian, tribe, or nation."

In the Act, Congress unilaterally diminished the power of the five sovereign tribal governments, lost powers were reinstated by the Oklahoma Indian Welfare Act of 1936. The Department of the Interior took over the Indian schools, school funds, and tribal government buildings and furniture. The law provided that the President may appoint a principal chief for any of the tribes. If a chief failed to sign a document presented to him by U.S. authorities, he was either to be replaced or the document could be simply approved by the Secretary of the Interior. The law also provided that:

- That the principal chief of the Seminole Nation is hereby authorized to execute the deeds to allottees in the Seminole Nation prior to the time when the Seminole government shall cease to exist.
- Coal and asphalt lands are reserved for sale when their leases expire
- When land allotments (Land patent) have been made to all members and freedmen of the tribes, surplus lands may be sold by the Secretary of the Interior with proceeds deposited in the United States Treasury to the credit of the respective tribes.
- Power companies operating in Indian Territory are empowered to construct, own and operate dams, canals, and reservoirs across any non-navigable stream for the purpose of generating and distributing electrical power, light and heat to other places.
- Upon dissolution of the Tribes, tribal land shall not become public lands nor property of the United States, but shall be held in trust by the United States for the use and benefit of the Indians respectively comprising each of said tribes
- "That the tribal existence and present tribal governments of the Choctaw, Chickasaw, Cherokee, Creek, and Seminole tribes or nations arc hereby continued in full force and effect for all purposes authorized by law, until otherwise provided by law, but the tribal council or legislature in any of said tribes or nations shall not be in session for a longer period than thirty days in any one year: Provided, That no act, ordinance, or resolution (except resolutions of adjournment) of the tribal council or legislature of any of said tribes or nations shall be of any validity until approved by the President of the United States: Provided further, That no contract involving the payment or expenditure of any money or affecting any property belonging to any of said tribes or nations made by them or any of them or by any officer thereof, shall be of any validity until approved by the President of the United States."
- That all Acts and parts of Acts inconsistent with the provisions of this Act be, and the same are hereby, repealed

== Enabling Act of 1906 ==
The Oklahoma Enabling Act of June 16, 1906 provided for the people of Oklahoma and Indian Territories to elect delegates to a state constitutional convention, and established the Territorial capital in Guthrie, Oklahoma, until 1913, when a permanent capital would be selected by a statewide election.

The act also provided "that nothing contained in the said constitution shall be construed to limit or impair the rights of person or property pertaining to the Indians of said Territories (so long as such rights shall remain unextinguished) or to limit or affect the authority of the Government of the United States to make any law or regulation respecting such Indians, their lands, property, or other rights by treaties, agreement, law, or otherwise, which it would have been competent to make if this Act had never been passed."

The same act also provided for the people of New Mexico and of Arizona to form a constitution and State government and be admitted into the Union.

At the time President Roosevelt proclaimed Oklahoma a state on November 16, 1907, there were no Indian Reservations within the state boundaries; former Indian Lands were either held by the U.S. Government in trust for members of the tribes, were allotted to members of the tribe, or distributed through land runs for settlers to homestead, ultimately receiving a Land patent as title to the land. Tribal governments were basically relegated to settling disputes between tribal members based on tribal custom, and being a conduit for federally sponsored community support. Some tribes distributed royalty income to members from oil and gas leases on tribal grounds.

== See also ==
- Treaty with Choctaws and Chickasaws and the Confederacy
- Aboriginal title in the United States
- Johnson v. McIntosh, 21 U.S. (8 Wheat.) 543 (1823), is a landmark decision of the U.S. Supreme Court that held that private citizens could not purchase lands from Native Americans.
- Reconstruction Treaties that were formulated by the Congressional Southern Treaty Commission during the post-Civil War Reconstruction period
- Oklahoma Enabling Act stating requirements for Oklahoma Statehood
- Former Indian Reservations in Oklahoma
