= Boomers (Oklahoma settlers) =

Settlers of Oklahoma when it was called "Unassigned Lands"

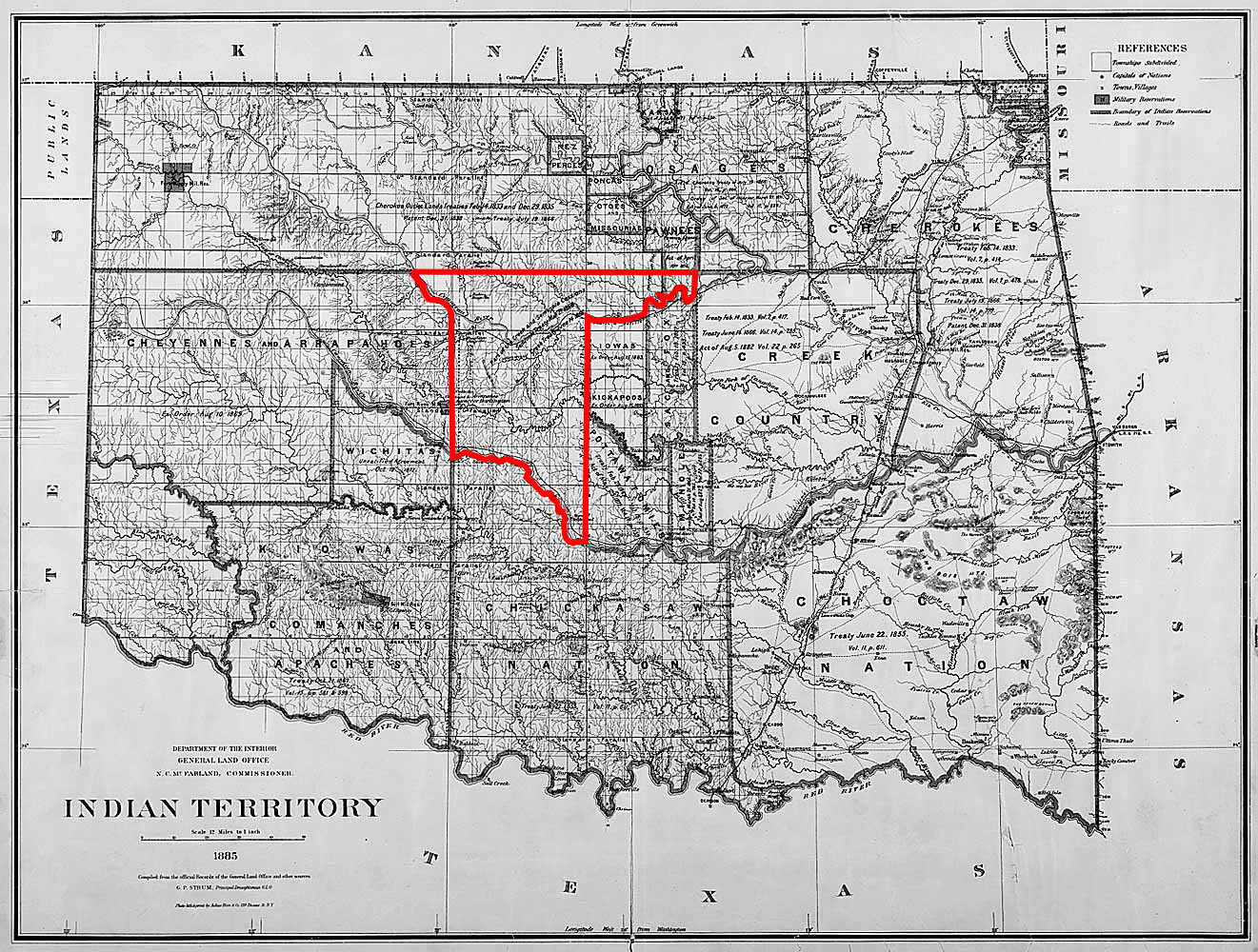
Unassigned Lands – 1885

"Boomers" is the name used for a group of settlers in the Southern United States in what is now the state of Oklahoma.

They were participants in the "Boomer Movement." These participants were white settlers from 1879–1889 who believed the so-called "Unassigned Lands" within the Indian Territory were public property and open to anyone for settlement, not just Indian tribes. Their belief was based on a clause in the Homestead Act of 1862 which said that any settler could claim 160 acres (0.65 km^{2}; 0.25 sq mi) of "public land."

The land was said to be public because it had been set aside for Indian reservations, yet the allotment for some tribes was reduced as a result of allying with the Confederacy during the Civil War and the Reconstruction Treaties that followed. The name "Boomer" came from figuratively making noise and raising hell for their claims. Some Boomers entered the Unassigned Lands and were removed more than once by the Army on the Frontier. Charles C. Carpenter was the earliest leader of the Boomer movement, but was eventually succeeded by David L. Payne. Payne helped grow the movement by founding the Southwestern Colonization Company, which served to organize the movement. After his death, Payne was succeeded by William L. Couch.

President Grover Cleveland opened the Indian Territory to settlement by signing the Indian Appropriations Act of 1889 on March 2, 1889. The result was the Land Rush of 1889. In it, rushers could be divided into two groups: the Sooners were settlers who illegally entered the Unassigned Lands prior to the April 22, 1889 official opening in order to claim lands without competition, and the (redundantly named) "Boomers" were settlers that actually participated in the race to grab the best land.

After its founding in 1890, the University of Oklahoma adopted "Boomers" as the nickname of their football team, after having first tried "Rough Riders." In 1908, the name was changed to "Sooners", the current team name. Their fight song is "Boomer Sooner". The OU "mascot" is the Sooner Schooner, a Conestoga wagon that crosses the field when the University of Oklahoma football team scores. It is pulled by a pair of ponies named "Boomer" and "Sooner". There are a pair of costumed mascots also named "Boomer" and "Sooner".
