= Reconstruction Treaties =

United States and Native American treaties

On the eve of the American Civil War in 1861, a significant number of Indigenous peoples of the Americas had been relocated from the Southeastern United States to Indian Territory, west of the Mississippi. The inhabitants of the eastern part of the Indian Territory, the Five Civilized Tribes, were suzerain nations with established tribal governments, well established cultures, and legal systems that allowed for slavery. Before European Contact these tribes were generally matriarchial societies, with agriculture being the primary economic pursuit. The bulk of the tribes lived in towns (some covering hundreds of acres and containing thousands of people) with planned streets, residential and public areas. The people were ruled by complex hereditary chiefdoms of varying size and complexity with high levels of military organization.

By the middle of the 19th century, the United States Government had started leasing land from the Five Civilized Tribes (ex. Choctaw and Chickasaw) in the western, more arid, part of Indian Territory. These leased lands were used to resettle several Plains Indian tribes that tended to be nomadic in nature, embracing the horse culture. At the extreme, the Comanche society was based on patrilinear and patrilocal extended family sharing a common language; they did not develop the political idea of forming a nation or tribe until their relocation to Indian Territory.

At the beginning of the Civil War, the Union army was withdrawn from Indian Territory exposing the Five Civilized Tribes to aggression from the Plains Indians. The Confederacy filled the vacuum. All of the Five Civilized Tribes as well as other surrounding tribes signed treaties with the Confederacy. As a part of reconstruction, the Southern Treaty Commission was created by Congress to write new treaties with the Tribes that sided with the Confederacy.

An important consequence of the Reconstruction Treaties, signed in 1866, was the emancipation of 7,000 black slaves and the abolition of slavery.

== Civil War ==
The Choctaw Nation and Chickasaw Nation in Indian Territory strongly support the Confederacy which signed the Treaty with Choctaws and Chickasaws. The Cherokee Nation, Muscogee (Creek) Nation and Seminole Nation had troops fighting on both sides. Other tribes such as Osage, Seneca, Seneca and Shawnee of the Neosho Agency, and Quapaw Tribes also signed treaties with the Confederacy.

During the Civil War, the Union Congress passed a statute that gave the President the authority to suspend the appropriations of any tribe if the tribe is "in a state of actual hostility to the government of the United States… and, by proclamation, to declare all treaties with such tribe to be abrogated by such tribe"(25 U.S.C. Sec. 72).

== Reconstruction Era ==
The term Reconstruction Era typically covers the transformation of the Southern United States in the decade after the Civil War. However, the reconstruction of the Indian Territory lasted significantly longer and fostered policy changes that impacted other tribes in the rest of the country.

=== Southern Treaty Commission ===
As a component of Reconstruction, a "grand council was called by the President of the United States, through the department of the Interior, to which a summons was issued to each of the five tribes to send representatives. This call was mandatory as far as it related to all Indian tribes which had been identified by treaty or otherwise with the late southern confederacy. Word was also given to other tribes, many of whom had reservations in Kansas." The Council of the Southern Treaty Commission, held in Fort Smith, Arkansas, was attended by hundreds of Indians representing dozens of tribes. Over the next several years the commission negotiated treaties with different tribes that resulted in additional relocations to Indian Territory and the de facto creation (initially by treaty) of an unorganized Oklahoma Territory.

In September 1865, the Southern Treaty Commission, headed by Dennis N. Cooley, Commissioner of Indian Affairs met with delegates of the Five Civilized Tribes as well as other tribes in Fort Smith. At the meeting Cooley informed the tribes that by joining the Confederacy, their previous treaties were null and void, and that new treaties would need to be negotiated. Key components of new treaties would be the abolishment of slavery, providing homes for the freedmen, and giving up part of their lands for the settlement of other American Indians.

It was stated that it was the policy of the US Government that "all nations and tribes in the Indian Territory be formed into one consolidated government after the plan proposed by the Senate of the United States, in a bill for organizing the Indian territory."

One result of the meeting was an "agreement" (not an officially ratified treaty) that served as a basis for the treaties that were signed the following year. In the agreement, the tribes agreed to "in all things recognize the government of the United States as exercising exclusive jurisdiction over them, and will not enter into any allegiance or conventional arrangement with any state, nation, power or sovereign whatsoever; that any treaty of alliance for cession of land, or any act heretofore done by them, or any of their people, by which they renounce their allegiance to the United States, is hereby revoked, cancelled, and repudiated"

The council adjourned, and was called back to order the middle of 1866.

Negotiations with the Osage Nation continued with the Canville Treaty signed a few days later.

=== Committee on Territories ===
The United States House Committee on Territories was initially formed in 1825. Shortly after the Civil War, the Committee began discussing how best to assimilate the Five Civilized Tribes into the Union. Two significant decisions were made by the committee with regards to how the Union interacted with the Native Americans:

1. It was decided that Indian removal had limited effectiveness and that the new policy would be one of assimilation. One component of assimilation would be the distribution of property held in-common by the tribe to individual members of the tribe.
2. In 1871, Congress decided that the United States would no longer deal with Indian tribes through a formal treaty-making process, providing that "[n]o Indian nation or tribe within the territory of the United States shall be acknowledged or recognized as an independent nation . . .".

These decisions were implemented over subsequent years through numerous "reconstruction treaties" and subsequent laws, including the Indian Appropriations Act, Homestead Act (which provided a framework for land runs), Dawes Act, Dawes Commission, Curtis Act of 1898 (which extended the allotment process to the tribes of Indian Territory and limited the scope of tribal courts and governments), Oklahoma organic act in 1890, and the Five Civilized Tribe Act of April 26, 1906 which "Provide for the Final Disposition of the Affairs of the Five Civilized Tribes in Oklahoma."

== Tribes making treaties with the Confederacy ==
When the Union troops withdrew from Indian Territory, the Five Civilized Tribes were unprotected from attack by the Plains Indians that had been settled in the western part of the Territory. General Benjamin McCulloch and Brigadier General Albert Pike were placed in command of Indian Territory for the Confederacy, and offered protection to the tribes in the eastern part of the territory.

Tribes that entered into treaties with the Confederacy were left "without any treaty whatever or treaty obligations for protection by the United States" and include:

- Five Civilized Tribes
  - Creek Nation - July 10, 1861
  - Choctaw and Chickasaw - July 12, 1861
  - Seminole - August 1, 1861
  - Cherokee - October 7, 1861
- Other Tribes
  - Shawnees, Delawares, Wichitas and affiliated tribes residing on "leased territories" (the western part of Choctaw and Chickasaw territories) - August 12, 1861
  - Comanches of the Prairie - August 12, 1861
  - Osage - October 21, 1861
  - Quapaw - October 4, 1861
  - Senecas as well as Senecas and Shawnee of the Neosho Agency - October 4, 1861

== Southern Treaty Commission Delegations ==
=== Federal ===
Brigader General Bussey was in command of the Post at Ft. Smith. Representing the Federal Government were:

- Secretary of the Interior: James Harlan
- Commissioner of Indian Affairs: Dennis N. Cooley (President of the Commission)
- Superintendent of Indian Affairs for the Southern Superintendency: Elijah Sells
- Special Commissioner Ely S. Parker (a member of the Seneca Nation and future commissioner of Indian affairs under President Ulysses S. Grant)
- Commissioner of the General Land Office: James M. Edmunds
- Thomas Wistar of Pennsylvania
- Major General William S. Harney, United States Army
- Major General Harron, United States Army
- Chief Clerk of the Indian Bureau: Mr. Mix (Secretary of the Commission)
- United States Agents
  - JB Abbott: Shawnees in Kansas
  - Isaac Coleman: Choctaw and Chickasaw
  - JW Dunn: Creek, Milo Gookins, Wichitas, and tribes on land leased from Chickasaws and Choctaws
  - Justin Harlan: Cherokee
  - George A Reynolds: Seminole
  - Major Snow: Osage, Quapaws, Senecas and Shawnees of the Neosho Agency

=== Tribal ===
Tribes represented include Osage, Senecas, Seneca and Shawnee of the Neosho agency, Shawnee, Quapaw and Wyandotts. From Kansas the Chickasaw, Choctaw, Delawares, and Sacs and Foxes.

- Choctaw: Colonel RM Jones (President), JR Kingsbury (Secretary), David Birney
- Chickasaw: Colbert Carter (President), Lewis Johnson (Secretary), AG Griffith, (Maharda Colbert-Interpreter)
- Osage: Me-lo-tah-mo-ne, Wa-dah-ne-ga

Some tribes sent two delegations, one representing a Southern faction and the other representing a Northern faction. The Government typically negotiated only with the Northern delegates.

- Cherokee
  - Northern: headed by John Ross (Cherokee chief), Colonel Reese, Pas-co-fa, Fos-har-go, Cho-Cote Har-go, Fos-hut-she
  - Southern: headed by Elias Cornelius Boudinot (a colonel in the Confederate States Army, and a territorial representative in the Confederate Congress) and Stand Watie (a brigadier general of the Confederate States Army, and the last Confederate general in the field to surrender.)
- Muscogee (Creek)
  - Northern: Mik-ko-hut-kee (Little White Chief), Sanford Berryman
  - Southern: Colonel Daniel N. McIntosh
- Seminole
  - Northern: John Chupco
  - Southern: John Brown

== Treaties of Washington ==
Many of the Reconstruction Treaties were titled with the phrase "Treaty of Washington." These treaties replaced the treaties that were voided when the tribes signed treaties with the Confederacy. Some Indian tribes signed treaties at the Ft. Smith conference. The Five Civilized Tribes agreed to draft treaties, but final treaties were signed in Washington, D.C. during the year of 1866.

- Five Civilized Tribes
  - The Chickasaw and Choctaw signed the Chickasaw and Choctaw Treaty of Washington, Proclaimed on July 10, 1866
  - Creek August 11, 1866
  - Cherokee Reconstruction Treaty of 1866 (August 11)
  - Seminole treaty ratified on August 16, 1866
- Tribes occupying Leased Land of Choctaw and Chickasaw tribes
  - Shawnees October 14, 1868
  - Delawares August 10, 1866
- Other Tribes
  - Osage Jan 21 1867
  - Sac and Fox 1867

All the treaties contained:

- amnesty for all crimes committed against the United States prior to the treaties
- included specific provisions of peace and friendship toward the United States
- notice that previous treaties were null and void
- the Tribes acknowledgement of the supremacy of the United States Government, its Constitution, and its laws: past, present and future
- clause stating that no federal legislation could interfere with their tribal organization
- tribes would provide Land grants in their various domains for rights-of-way for railroad (and sometimes telegraph) construction through Indian Territory

=== Freedman tribal rights ===
Different tribes addressed freedman tribal rights (resulting from the abolition of slavery) in different ways. The Cherokee, Creek, and Seminole treaties gave the freedmen unqualified rights, while the Choctaw and Chickasaw treaty gave them the choice of being adopted into their nations or being removed by the federal government and settled elsewhere. The Chickasaw however refused to accept the Freedmen into the Chickasaw Nation on the grounds that the Nation was so small that absorbing their Freedmen would dilute the Chickasaw Nation. This refusal resulted in the Chickasaw Freedmen spending a significant number of years being citizens of no country at all.

=== Intertribal Council ===
The Intertribal Council evolved into the Territorial Legislature for the Indian Territory described in the Oklahoma organic act which established Oklahoma and Indian Territories. Each tribe would have one representative, with an additional representative for each one thousand tribal members. The superintendent of Indian affairs would serve as the council's chief executive.

== Land concessions ==
=== Choctaw and Chickasaw ===
The Choctaw and Chickasaw Nations had a single Reconstruction Treaty, the Choctaw and Chickasaw Treaty of Washington (1866). in which they sold land west of the 98 longitude to the United States for $300,000. Much of this land was previously "leased" to the Federal Government and was the home of other Indian tribes.

=== Cherokee ===
Cherokee gave up their "Neutral Lands" in southeastern Kansas and the Cherokee Strip, to be sold to the highest bidder for not less than $1.25 an acre. They also agreed to sell land to the Osage Nation and to allow the federal government to settle other tribes in the Cherokee Outlet in exchange for payment made by the government to the Cherokee Nation.

=== Muskogee (Creek) ===
The Creek ceded the western half of their lands to the Federal Government for $975,168, about $0.30 per acre

=== Seminole ===
The Seminole sold all of their land in the western part of the territory for $0.15 per acre to the Federal Government. The Seminole then purchased from the Federal Government about two hundred thousand acres of land (the current Seminole County, Oklahoma) for $0.50 per acre (former Creek land).

=== Osage ===
The Osage Nation originated in the Ohio River valley in present-day Kentucky. After years of war with invading Iroquois, they become the dominant power in an area between the Missouri and Red rivers. The Reconstruction era treaties provided an excuse for the Osage to be moved to an area in Oklahoma Territory. With the 1865 Treaty with the Osage the tribe sells significant territory in Kansas and Missouri to the US for $1.25 per acre. The Drum Creek Treaty of 1870 provided that the remainder of Osage land in Kansas be sold and the proceeds used to relocate the tribe to the Cherokee Outlet. That Osage purchased the land from the Cherokees, receiving Fee simple title, provided the tribe with a legitimately that later allowed them more autonomy when the State of Oklahoma was formed. The land purchased is now the present Osage County, Oklahoma.

=== Tribes of the Quapaw Indian Agency ===
The tribes of the Quapaw Indian Agency are the Eastern Shawnee, Miami, Modoc, Ottawa, Peoria of the Illinois Confederation, Quapaw Tribe, Seneca and Cayuga of the Iroquois Confederacy, and Wyandotte, and some small remnants of other tribes. The tribes were originally removed from California, Illinois, Indiana, Ohio and New York to Kansas, Missouri and Arkansas Territory in the 1820s and 1830s. The post-Civil War Treaties negotiated by the Southern Treaty Commission with the various tribes relocated these tribes to an area northeast of the Cherokee nation, chiefly in what is today Ottawa and Delaware Counties in Oklahoma. Many of the tribal governments are located in Miami, Oklahoma.

== See also ==
- Native Americans in the United States
- Tribal sovereignty in the United States
- Native American self-determination
