= David L. Payne =

American politician

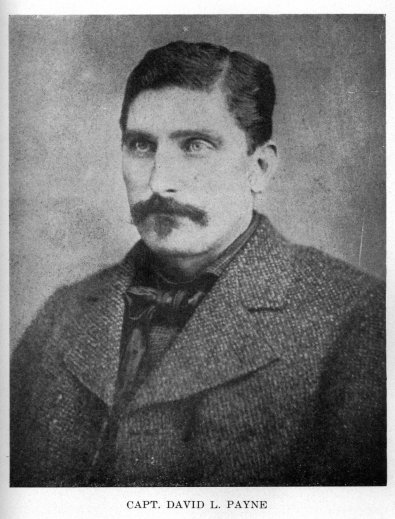
- David L. Payne
- Born: December 30, 1836; Grant County, Indiana, U.S.
- Died: November 28, 1884 (aged 47); Wellington, Kansas, U.S.
- Other name: "Father of Oklahoma"
- Occupation: American politician
- Spouse: Rachel Anna Haines (common law wife)

David Lewis Payne (December 30, 1836 – November 28, 1884) was an American soldier and pioneer. Payne is considered by some to be the "Father of Oklahoma" for his work in opening the state to settlement.

He organized, trained, and led the "Boomer Army" on its forays into the Unassigned Lands. Payne's excursions into the Unassigned Lands, trips led by others, and lobbying of Congress by railroad interests eventually convinced the government to open the Unassigned Lands for settlement in 1889, about four years after Payne's death. The formation of Indian Territory and Oklahoma Territory followed, and Oklahoma became a state in 1907.

== Early life and education ==
Payne was born in 1836 in Grant County, Indiana, on a farm near Fairmount. He grew up working on his father's farm. During winters he attended the local rural school.

In the spring of 1858, Payne and his brother left home intending to join in the Utah War. Their interest evidently waned by the time they crossed the Missouri River, as they stopped in Doniphan County, Kansas. There, in Burr Oak Township, Payne acquired some land and built a sawmill. It soon failed and Payne fell to hunting to support himself. Eventually private parties and then the Federal government hired him to scout for their various expeditions. These activities led to his exploration of what would later become Oklahoma.

== Career ==
At the opening of the Civil War, Payne enlisted in the 4th Kansas Volunteer Infantry. In April 1862, his regiment and the 3rd Kansas Infantry and 5th Kansas Infantry were consolidated to form the 10th Kansas Infantry. He served from August 1861 to August 1864 as a private in Company F. During his service the unit saw action in Kansas, Missouri, Arkansas, and the Cherokee Nation, including the Battle of Prairie Grove in 1862.

At the end of his three-year service Payne returned to Doniphan County and was elected to the Kansas House of Representatives, serving in the 1864, 1865, and 1872 sessions.

In March 1865, Payne enlisted for one year in the 15th Kansas Cavalry as a private assigned to Company H. The unit had been activated in response to a January state legislative resolution which called for the organization of a regiment of veteran volunteer cavalry to protect western Kansas from Indian activity.

In July 1867, Kansas Governor Samuel Johnson Crawford issued a proclamation calling for volunteers to protect Kansans from Indian attacks in the west. The 18th Kansas Cavalry was brought up for four months as a result. Payne enlisted and was mustered in as the captain of Company D. This battalion replaced the Seventh Cavalry which had been transferred to the Platte River for the summer. In October 1868, Payne mustered in as a lieutenant in Company H of the 19th Kansas Cavalry, which served in a winter campaign against Indians on the western Great Plains. During this campaign, Payne served as a scout for General Philip Sheridan.

In 1870 Payne moved to Sedgwick County, near Wichita, and the following year he was again elected to the Kansas House of Representatives. This led to appointments as Postmaster at Fort Leavenworth in 1867 and as Sergeant-at-arms for two terms of the Kansas Senate. In 1875 and 1879, Payne served as assistant to the Doorkeeper of the United States House of Representatives.

During the intervals between political engagements and military service, Payne supported himself by hunting, scouting, and guiding wagon trains.

=== Boomer ===
In 1866, shortly after the Civil War, the Federal government forced many tribes in the Indian Territory into making concessions. The government accused the various tribes of abrogating the standing treaties by joining the Confederacy. As a result, some two million acres (8,000 km^{2}) of land in the center of Indian Territory were ceded to the United States and thought by many to be public domain land.

Elias Boudinot, a Cherokee citizen working as a lobbyist in Washington, D.C., published an article about the public land issue in the February 17, 1879, edition of the Chicago Times. Dr. Morrison Munford of the Kansas City Times began referring to this tract as the "Unassigned Lands" or "Oklahoma" and to the people agitating for its settlement as Boomers. Munford is the first person to use the terms "boom" and "boomer" to describe the movement of white settlers into these lands. To prevent settlement of the land, President Rutherford B. Hayes issued a proclamation in April 1879 forbidding unlawful entry into Indian Territory.

Inspired by Boudinot, Payne began his efforts to enter and settle the public domain lands as allowed by existing law. He returned from his job in Washington and returned to Wichita in 1879. On his first attempt to enter Indian Territory, in April 1880, Payne and his party laid out a town they named "Ewing" on the present-day site of Oklahoma City. The Fourth Cavalry arrested them, took them to Fort Reno, then escorted them back to Kansas. Payne was furious, as public law (specifically the Posse Comitatus Act) prohibited the military from interfering in civil matters. Payne and his party were freed, which effectively denied them access to federal and state courts.

Anxious to prove his case in court, Payne and a larger group returned to Ewing in July 1879. The Army again arrested the party, escorted them back to Kansas, and freed them. This time, however, Payne was charged under the Indian Intercourse Act and brought to trial in Fort Smith, Arkansas, in March 1881. Judge Isaac C. Parker ruled against Payne and fined him the maximum amount of US$1,000, but since Payne had no money and no property, the fine could not be collected. The ruling settled nothing about the public lands, however, and Payne continued his activities unabated. He organized and led several more expeditions into the territory, even forming a newspaper called the Oklahoma War Chief, the first in the Cherokee Outlet, which he published in several sites along the Kansas-Indian Territory border.

During one of his last ventures, Payne insisted on a public trial, so he and his group were hauled several hundred miles to Fort Smith. The trip began at Fort Reno and proceeded to Fort Sill, Henrietta, Texas, Texarkana, Arkansas, Little Rock, Arkansas, and then finally to Fort Smith. During another trip in July 1884, the army seized his Oklahoma War Chief press, burned his buildings, and took Payne and his group through the Cherokee Nation after their arrest. The party was paraded through the streets of Tahlequah, past the Indian people who hated him for his attempts to seize part of their lands.

Public sentiment grew so great over his mistreatment at the hands of the military that the government finally granted his trial. Payne was turned over to the United States District Court for the District of Kansas at Topeka. In the fall term, Judge Cassius G. Foster quashed the indictments and ruled that settling on the Unassigned Lands was not a criminal offense. Boomers celebrated, but the government refused to accept the decision.

Between expeditions, Payne often spoke to crowds of admirers and recruited more Boomers. At breakfast the day after such an address in Wellington, Kansas, on November 27, 1884, Payne collapsed and died of heart failure. His funeral filled the Methodist Episcopal Church in Wellington and thousands filed past his grave.

Payne's family moved his remains to Oklahoma in 1995. On April 22, 1996, a monument was dedicated at his final resting place in Stillwater, Oklahoma. Payne County, of which Stillwater is the county seat, is named in his honor.

William Couch succeeded Payne as leader of the Boomer movement.

== See also ==
- Neutral Strip
- Sooners
