= Sooners =

Settlers in Oklahoma, now a demonym

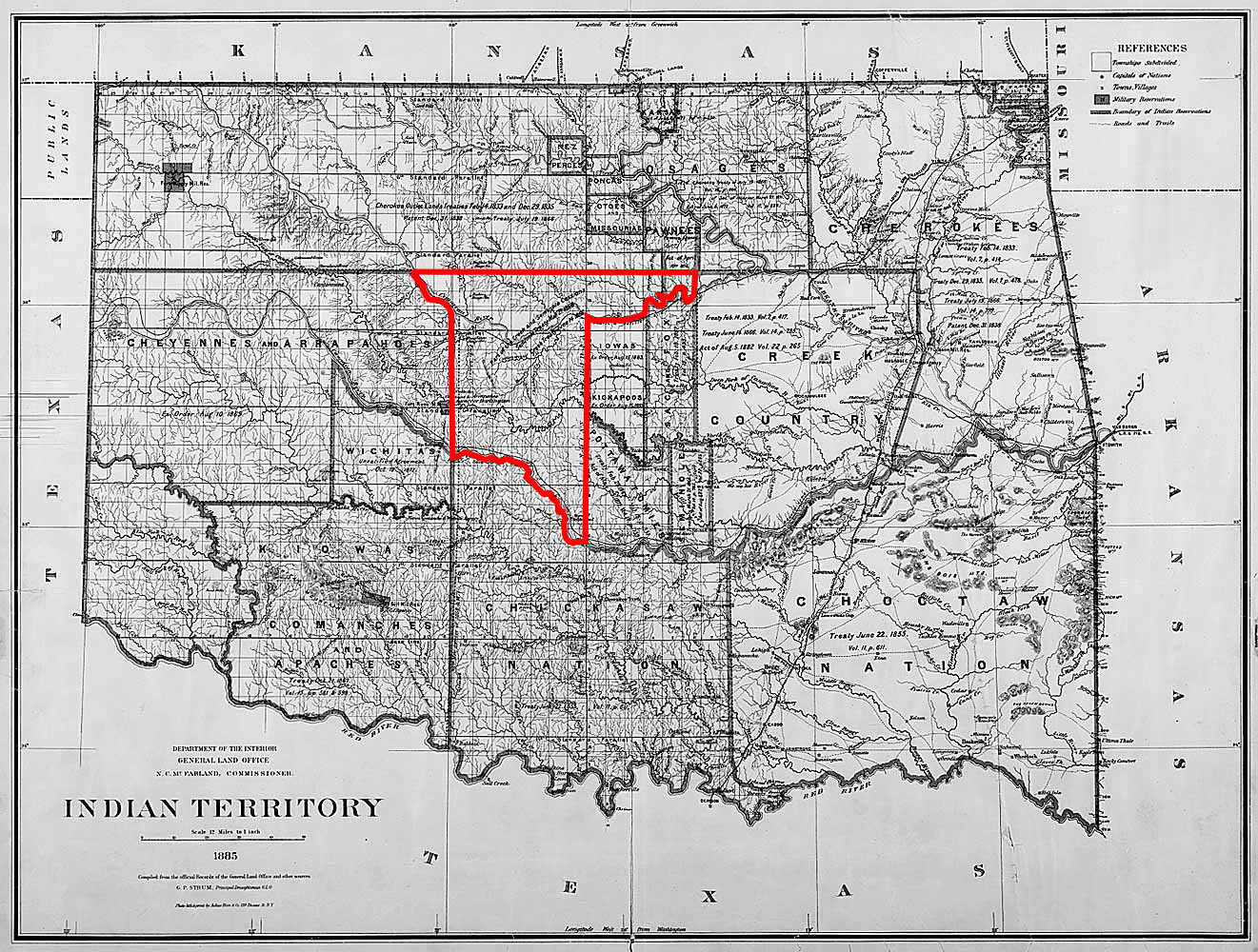
Unassigned Lands – 1885

Sooners is the name given to settlers who entered the Unassigned Lands illegally in what is now the state of Oklahoma before the official start of the Land Rush of 1889. The Unassigned Lands were a part of Indian Territory that, after a lobbying campaign, were to be opened to American settlement in 1889. President Benjamin Harrison officially proclaimed the Unassigned Lands open to settlement on April 22, 1889. As people lined up around the borders of the Oklahoma District, they waited for the official opening. It was not until noon that it officially was opened to settlement. The name derived from the "sooner clause" of Proclamation 288 — Opening to Settlement Certain Lands in the Indian Territory, which stated that anyone who entered and occupied the land prior to the opening time would be denied the right to claim land.

The designation "Sooner" had a very negative connotation. While both "Boomers" and Sooners were appropriating land legally reserved for native Americans, Sooners gained more negative notoriety in the mainstream American historical narrative because they were utilizing an extralegal advantage by arriving before the legally authorized period. The common framing of this telling of history in which only the Sooners are painted in a negative light illustrates a common bias toward erasing native histories altogether. However, these negative connotations cooled as time passed after 1889 and land claims were settled. In 1908, the University of Oklahoma football team adopted the nickname "Sooners". The U.S. state of Oklahoma has adopted the nickname the "Sooner State" since the 1920s.

== Characteristics ==
Sooners are not to be confused with deputy marshals, land surveyors, railroad employees, and others who were able to legally enter the territory early. Sooners who crossed into the territory illegally at night were originally also sometimes called "moonshiners" because they had entered "by the light of the moon". These Sooners would hide in ditches at night and suddenly appear to stake their claim after the land run started, hours ahead of legal settlers.

== Relationship with Boomers ==
The term Boomer relating to Oklahoma refers to participants in the "Boomer Movement", white settlers who believed the Unassigned Lands were public property and open to anyone for settlement, not just Native American tribes. Their reasoning came from a clause in the Homestead Act of 1862, which said that any settler could claim 160 acres (0.65 km^{2}) of public land. Some Boomers entered and were removed more than once by the United States Army.

Those who actually observed the official start of the land run and began the race for free land often found choice sections of land already occupied by Sooners or, in some cases, by Boomers. Problems with Sooners continued with each successive land run; in an 1895 land run as much as half of the available land was taken by Sooners. Litigation between legitimate land-run participants and Sooners continued well into the 20th century, and eventually the United States Department of the Interior was given ultimate authority to settle the disputes.

== Sports ==
In 1908, the University of Oklahoma adopted "Sooners" as the nickname of its football team, after having first tried "Rough Riders" and "Boomers". Eventually, Oklahoma became known as "The Sooner State". The school fight song is titled "Boomer Sooner". The school "mascot" is a replica of a 19th-century covered wagon, called the "Sooner Schooner". When the OU football team scores the Sooner Schooner is pulled across the field by a pair of ponies named "Boomer" and "Sooner". There are a pair of costumed mascots also named "Boomer" and "Sooner".
