= William Couch =

American politician (1850-1890)

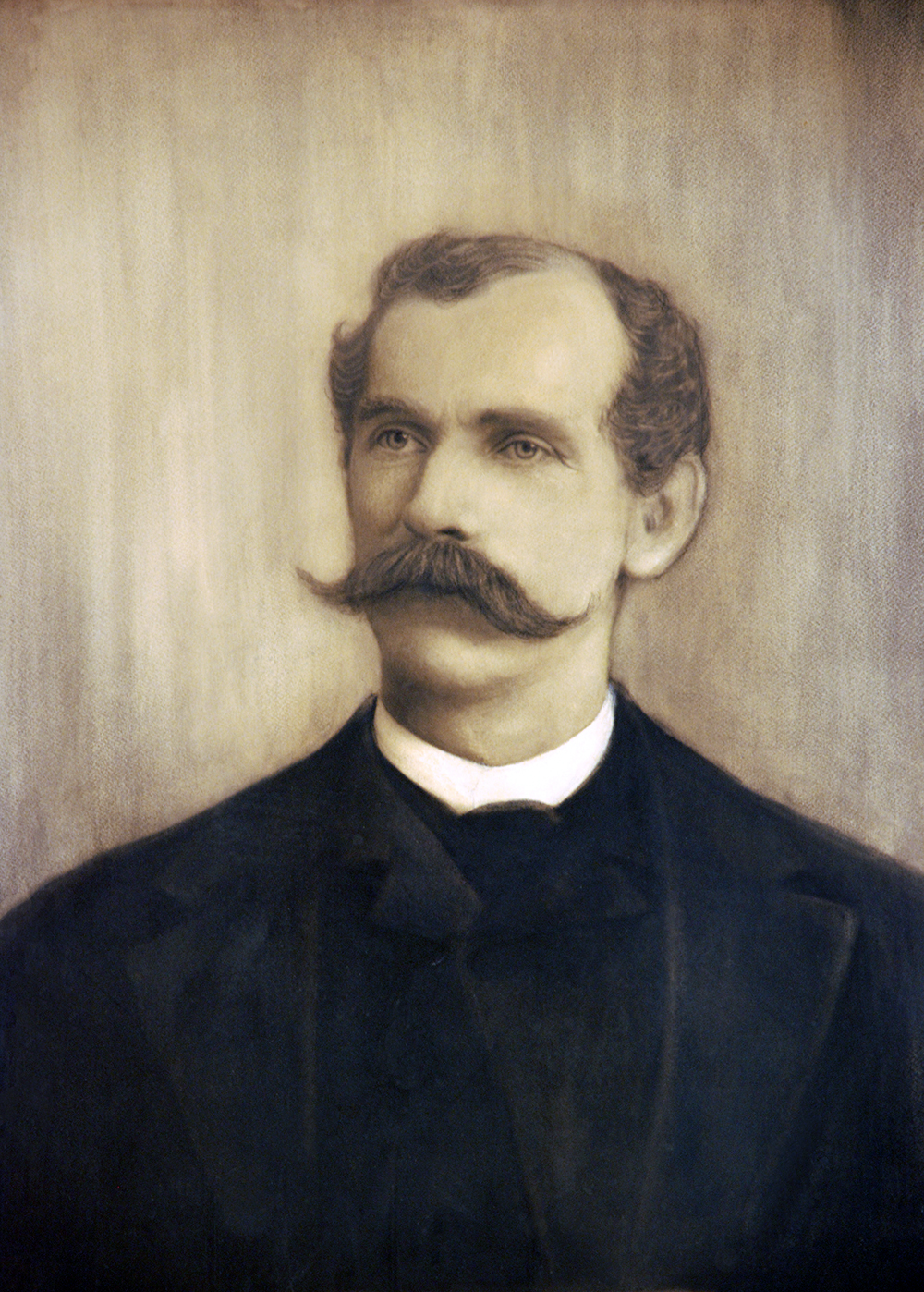
- William L. Couch in 1889

1st Mayor of Oklahoma City
- In office April 27, 1889 – November 11, 1889
- Preceded by: position established
- Succeeded by: Sidney Clarke (acting)

Personal details
- Born: November 20, 1850 Wilkes County, North Carolina
- Died: April 21, 1890 (aged 39) Oklahoma City, Oklahoma
- Children: Ciscero Couch

William Lewis Couch (November 20, 1850 – April 21, 1890), a native of North Carolina and later a resident of Kansas, was best known as a leader of the Boomer Movement and as the first provisional mayor of Oklahoma City, Oklahoma in 1889. He joined the Boomer Movement in 1880 and became the sole leader of the movement after David L. Payne's death on November 28, 1884. He participated in the Oklahoma Land Run on April 22, 1889.

== Early life ==
Couch was born in Wilkes County, North Carolina, on November 20, 1850, as the eldest child of Meshach H. and Mary Bryan Couch. His father moved the family to Kansas after the end of the Civil War. He had little formal education, although he became known as an avid reader. Couch married Cynthia Gordon, a Quaker woman who was older than himself. They later moved to Butler County, Kansas, in 1871, where they bought a farm near Douglass. When a railroad was built from Emporia to Wichita about 1874, Couch gave up farming to become an entrepreneur in Wichita. His businesses included selling grain, operating an elevator, trading and selling horses and mules, and running a combination hardware and grocery store. However, he soon lost much of his fortune because of reverses in the financial markets. Only the profits in his livestock business enabled him to support his family.

== Boomer movement ==
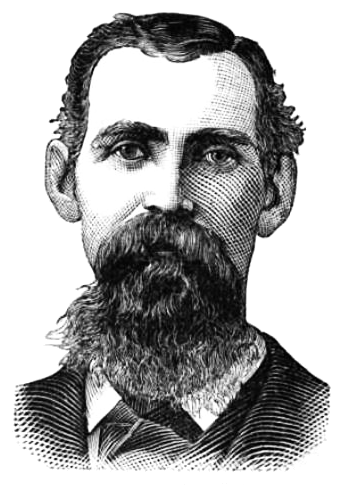
Couch in 1888.

In the fall of 1879, Couch heard David L. Payne give a talk about the availability of land for homesteads in Indian Territory (which Payne called "Oklahoma Country"). Payne asserted that the land in the territory was public land and thus should be free to homesteaders. Meanwhile, the U.S. government was already busy forcing Indian tribes onto these lands and warning would-be settlers that the lands were not free. Nevertheless, Couch became an enthusiastic follower of Payne's movement, formally joining the Boomers in 1880. William moved his family back to Douglass, where his father could look after them. By then, William and Cynthia had five children. William then became more active in the Payne movement and checking out locations that might make suitable homesteads.

Couch joined the Boomer Movement in 1880. Inspired by Payne, he soon became one of the Boomer leaders. In February, 1883, he led a group of Boomers into Indian Territory to stake out land claims. The army intervened, arrested the would-be settlers and interned them at Fort Reno, until they returned to Kansas. Couch immediately began planning new forays into the Oklahoma Country. He led two new expeditions, one in August 1883 and the other in April 1884. (Note: William's father, Meshack, evidently joined the April 1884 expedition, for that is when he claimed a homestead within the present site of Oklahoma City.)

William Couch became the sole leader of the movement after David L. Payne died of a heart attack in Wellington, Kansas, on November 28, 1884. One of his first acts in this new role was to lead a group of about 300 would-be settlers from Wellington across the Cherokee Outlet to a suitable area inside Indian Territory. On December 12, 1884, the expedition came to a stream that they named Still Water. A detachment of the U.S. Cavalry quickly arrived to cut off the Boomers' supplies, after which the invaders were arrested and forced out of the territory. After being released from custody, Couch spent the next few years in Washington, D. C., lobbying for the opening of the Unassigned Lands to public settlement. His arguments ultimately succeeded.

== End of political career and death ==
He participated in the Oklahoma Land Run on April 22, 1889, and was elected provisional mayor of the newly founded Oklahoma City, Oklahoma, on April 27, 1889. He remained mayor until he resigned on November 11, 1889. (Note: Couch resigned because "...he was one of the homestead claimants to the quarter section west of the city and under the provisions of the law it was necessary for a homesteader to establish actual residence upon his land within six months from the date of actual entry upon the land.) On April 4, 1890, he was shot by J. C. Adams in a duel involving a dispute over his homestead claim, and died on April 21, 1890. (Note: Couch was hit in one knee by a rifle ball and died of blood poisoning several days after the shootout.) Adams was arrested, tried in a federal court and spent several years in prison. The claims of both men were eventually dismissed.

== See also ==
- Boomers (Oklahoma settlers)
- David L. Payne
- Oklahoma Territory
