= Quapaw Indian Agency =

Coordinates: 36.6°N 94.8°W

The Quapaw Indian Agency was a territory that included parts of the present-day Oklahoma counties of Ottawa and Delaware. Established in the late 1830s as part of lands allocated to the Cherokee Nation, this area was later leased by the federal government and known as the Leased District. The area that became known as the Quapaw Agency Lands contained 220,000 acres and was located in the northeastern corner of Oklahoma where that state adjoins Missouri and Kansas.

After the Civil War, the Cherokee were forced to cede the land and the US assigned it to several other tribes. This area was settled prior to 1874 by 24 Indian groups. These range from full Indian tribes down to the remnants of several larger Indian groups whose main body settled elsewhere.

The agency was disbanded in 1890 by the Oklahoma Organic Act, which was designed to extinguish tribal communal land claims. The land was attached to an Indian Territory prior to passage of the Dawes Act and distribution of plots to individual households. Another Indian reserve, the Miami Indian Agency based in Miami, Oklahoma was disbanded at the same time. All Native American claims were extinguished prior to Oklahoma's admission to statehood in the 20th century.

== History ==
Among the tribes who were forcibly removed to these lands from east of the Mississippi River were people of the Algonquin and the Iroquois tribes. In the early colonial period, they had been enemies, however, due to the forced close proximity, and subsequently living and working together, tensions died down and the cultures which had once been separate, began to share some cultural practices and intermarry. Several Siouan nations also were located here such as the Quapaw, Osage, Ponca, Kansa, and Omaha. These old tribes had once occupied many hundreds of thousands of acres in Ohio, Illinois, Indiana, Arkansas, Oklahoma and Oregon.

Since early territorial days of 1867, a federal Indian agency operated to manage the relationship between the federal government and these various tribes, supervising provision of annuities and supplies, for instance. But not all of the business handled by the agent was tribal business. The Indian Agent often found acted as a mediator in settling neighborhood and family disputes, as well.

Because the land was originally given to the Quapaw Tribe, this area was renamed in the 19th century as the Quapaw Agency Lands. Prior to this, it and other nearby areas had been known as the Neosho Indian Agency, the Shawnee Indian Agency, and the Seneca Indian Agency, representing major tribes settled in the area. The agency was originally located four miles west of Seneca, Missouri, and later moved to Wyandotte in the Indian Territory as the Native Americans were settled there.

In 1873, 153 surviving members of a Modoc band formerly headed by Captain Jack (Kintpuash), were relocated here from northern California after their defeat. Kintpuash was hanged, executed by the US Army for charges of war crimes. The Modoc were long colocated with the Shawnee on their reserve at what became known as the Quapaw Agency. The agency did not receive sufficient supplies and the Modoc suffered greatly in their first months.

In 1920, two agencies were established; the Seneca and Quapaw. In 1922 they were combined again and became the Quapaw Agency.

Due to the proximity of their reservations, there were many intermarriages among members of the tribes in this northeast area. Several tribes eventually merged their governments. Some of the individual listings below will lead the researcher to the federally recognized tribal names by which these nations are known today.

== Primary Tribes ==
The Primary tribes of the Quapaw Indian Agency were:

- Eastern Shawnee, from Indiana, and Ohio
- Miami, from Illinois, Indiana, and Ohio
- Modoc, from the California-Oregon border
- Ottawa, from Michigan, Ohio, and Illinois
- Peoria of the Illinois Confederation, from Illinois,
- Quapaw Tribe, from Arkansas along the western bank of the Mississippi River
- Seneca and Cayuga of the Iroquois Confederacy, from New York
- Wyandotte, from Ohio

== Other Resources ==
=== Daniel B. Dyer Collection ===
John D. Miles, a Quaker, was employed as the Indian Agent from 1872 to 1884. Daniel B. Dyer was employed as Indian agent at the Quapaw Indian Agency from 1881 to 1884. The Daniel B. Dyer Collection located at The University of Kansas Libraries, Kenneth Spencer Research Library includes photographs of Quapaw and Osage Indians and the Quapaw and Modoc Methodist Mission. The collection also contains picture post cards of scenes in Oklahoma and Indian portraits from 1889 to 1908. A part of the peace policy of President Grant was to assign Quakers as Indian Agents.

=== National Archives Southwest Region ===
Many records of the Quapaw Agency are in the National Archives Southwest Region (Ft. Worth)[3], including:

Census records—Eastern Shawnee, 1882–1940 Miami, 1888–1940 Modoc, 1885–1890 Nez Perce, n.d. Ottawa, 1883–1888 Peoria, 1883–1959 Quapaw, 1885–1933, with updates to 1955 Seneca, 1877–1940 Wyandot, 1871–1956 Death rolls, 1931–1935 Birth rolls, 1931–1935 Miami applications and rejected applications, 1972–1973 Land and property records, 1873–1959 School records, 1882–1940 And many other administrative files and correspondence

Letters received by the Office of Indian Affairs from the Quapaw Agency, 1871–1880, have been microfilmed by the National Archives as part of their Microcopy Number M234, Rolls 703-713[4]. Copies are available at the National Archives and at the Family History Library and its family history centers on their microfilm roll numbers 1661433 thru 1661443.

Reports of Inspection of the Field Jurisdictions of the Office of Indian Affairs, 1873-1900 have been microfilmed by the National Archives as part of Microcopy Number M1070. The reports for Quapaw Agency, 1874–1898, are on rolls 41-42 of that Microcopy set[5]. Copies are available at the National Archives, their Regional Archives, and at the Family History Library and its family history centers (their microfilm roll numbers 1617714-1617715).

Microfilm copies of ...Narrative and Statistical Reports... for the Quapaw Agency, 1921–1938, are included in National Archives Microcopy M1011, Rolls 111-112[6], available in the National Archives system and in the collections of the Family History Library in Salt Lake City, beginning with their microfilm numbers 1724329-1724330.

Annual Indian Census Rolls were taken at this agency for 1885–1900 and 1922 thru 1939. These rolls have been microfilmed by the National Archives as part of their Microcopy Number M595, rolls 411-416[7]. Copies of these records are also available at the National Archives, their Regional Archives, and at the Family History Library and its family history centers (their microfilm roll numbers 581405-581410). These census rolls are also available online at Ancestry.com's subscription web site.

Quapaw Agency Records 1872-1948 (school, census, vital, allotment, and annuity) FHL Collection, film: 1204600 first film of a collection.

== See also ==
- Quapaw Indians
