= Indian Appropriations Act =

Several related U.S. laws

Indian Appropriations Acts
- Long title: Various acts making appropriations for the current and contingent expenses of the Indian Department, and for fulfilling treaty stipulations with various Indian tribes
- Acronyms (colloquial): IAA
- Enacted by: the 31st United States Congress
- Effective: 1851: February 27, 1851; 1871: March 3, 1871; 1885: March 3, 1885; 1902: May 27, 1902; (And various subsequent years)

Citations
- Statutes at Large: 1851 Act: 9 Stat. 574; 1871 Act: 16 Stat. 544; 1885 Act: 23 Stat. 362; 1902 Act: 32 Stat. 245

Codification
- Acts amended: Various historical Indian treaties
- Acts repealed: 1871 Act effectively ended the federal practice of treaty-making with tribes.
- U.S.C. sections created: 1851: Created the U.S. Indian reservation system.; 1871: Declared tribes are no longer independent nations.; 1885: Allowed negotiation/sale of unoccupied lands (Oklahoma).; 1902: "Dead Indian Act" permitted sale of allotted inherited lands.

The Indian Appropriations Act is the name of several acts passed by the United States Congress. A considerable number of acts were passed under the same name throughout the 19th and early 20th centuries, including the Appropriation Bill for Indian Affairs of 1851 and the 1871 Indian Appropriations Act. This was rooted in efforts to turn Indians into wards of the government. The power to prescribe this act came from revoking recognition of independence as nations, or tribes.

== 1851 Act ==
The 1851 Indian Appropriations Act allocated funds to move Western tribes onto Indian reservations where they would be protected and enclosed by the United States government. According to the federal government at that time, reservations were to be created in order to protect the Indians from increasing numbers of Americans moving to the West. This act set the precedent for modern-day Indian reservations.

There are differing explanations as to why this act was instituted, one of which is that Indians' control of land and natural resources around the country was regarded as a serious potential threat to Americans' expansionary and economic goals.

Another explanation is that due to the country's fixed amount of land, the previously unrestricted presence of the Natives' living under different tribal laws but outside the jurisdiction of American Law began to unintentionally, but naturally, conflict legally with the growing number of Americans settling on more and more lands. This quickly posed a potentially dangerous security and insurance concern for many enterprising Americans, and the federal government, responsible for protecting its own citizens, was expected to respond with a solution not known before and departing from that previously practiced by the British Empire.

The most utilized explanation originated in the 1830s, nearly two decades before the passing of this Act, when many Americans agreed with President Jackson theories conceptualized by President Thomas Jefferson in 1803, that Native Americans needed to be resettled westward for their own protection. As decided, Native Americans in the South were forced to move to the Great Plains, but by the 1850s, Americans began to move into that area as well. Thus, the federal government, acting on such exigency and on Americans' long-standing sentiments regarding the Indians, passed the Indian Appropriations Act of 1851, placing Native Americans on reservations given there were no other lands available for another forced relocation.

As a consequence, conflict in the Great Plains region was aggravated when settlers began to move into the final remaining land and Native Americans had no place in which to be relocated.

== 1871 Act ==
According to the Indian Appropriation Act of March 3, 1871, no longer was any group of Indians in the United States recognized as an independent nation by the federal government. Putting to rest debates on the dichotomy of recognized and unrecognized for varying tribes, the Act clearly states that "No Indian nation or tribe within the territory of the United States shall be acknowledged or recognized as an independent nation." Moreover, Congress directed that all Indians should be treated as individuals and legally designated "wards" of the federal government. Before this bill was enacted, the federal government signed treaties with different Native American tribes, committing the tribes to land cessions, in exchange for specific lands designated to Indians for exclusive indigenous use as well as annual payments in the form of cash, livestock, supplies, and services. These treaties, which took much time and effort to finalize, ceased with the passage of the 1871 Indian Appropriation Act, declaring that "no Indian nation or tribe" would be recognized "as an independent nation, tribe, or power with whom the United States may contract by treaty." On the other hand, the statute also declared "no obligation of any treaty lawfully made and ratified with any such Indian nation or tribe prior to March 3, 1871, shall be hereby invalidated or impaired." Thus, it can be argued that this bill made it significantly easier for the federal government to secure lands that were previously owned by Native Americans.

== 1885 Act ==
After several attempts by the Oklahoman Boomers to enter Indian Territory, Congress passed the 1885 Act which allowed Indian tribes and individual Indians to sell unoccupied lands that they claimed to be their own.

== 1889 Act ==
After years of trying to open Indian Territory, President Grover Cleveland, on March 2, 1889, signed the 1889 Act which officially opened the Unassigned Lands to non-native settlers under tenets of the Homestead Act. On a side-note, Grover Cleveland signed the Act into law days before his successor, Benjamin Harrison, took over as President of the United States. However, under a section in this original act, those who entered these unassigned lands illegally, before their respective racing times as designated in the President's opening proclamation, would be denied the rights to the lands they claimed. These people were termed "Sooners," with this section of the act being termed as the "sooner clause." But there was growing political pressure to open these unassigned lands to settlement quickly. Thus, later in 1889, an amendment to the Indian Appropriations Act allowed President Benjamin Harrison to be involved in this historical bill as well, proclaiming unassigned lands were open for settlement under much less stringent rules.

== Long-term effects ==
Though the United States continued to negotiate with tribes until the 1950s, the end of treaty-making signaled a decline in Indian sovereignty, leaving them in a "state of political limbo–no longer recognized as capable of formally treating with the federal government," but still separate nonconstitutional political entities. The 1871 Act significantly curtailed tribal sovereignty and autonomy, as decisions regarding land use, governance, and resource management were increasingly controlled by the federal government.

Legal implications today stem from this Act. Tribal sovereignty and the federal government's responsibility towards tribes are still subjects of ongoing legal battles and negotiations. The act's restrictions on tribal sovereignty have been challenged and modified over time, but its legacy continues to shape the relationship between Native American tribes and the federal government.

== See also ==
- Cherokee Commission
- Dawes Act
- Indian Peace Commission
- Medicine Lodge Treaty
- Treaty of Fort Laramie (1868)
