= Cherokee Outlet =

Section of the Indian Territory (Oklahoma) reserved for the Cherokee nation

Coordinates: 36.5°N 98.0°W

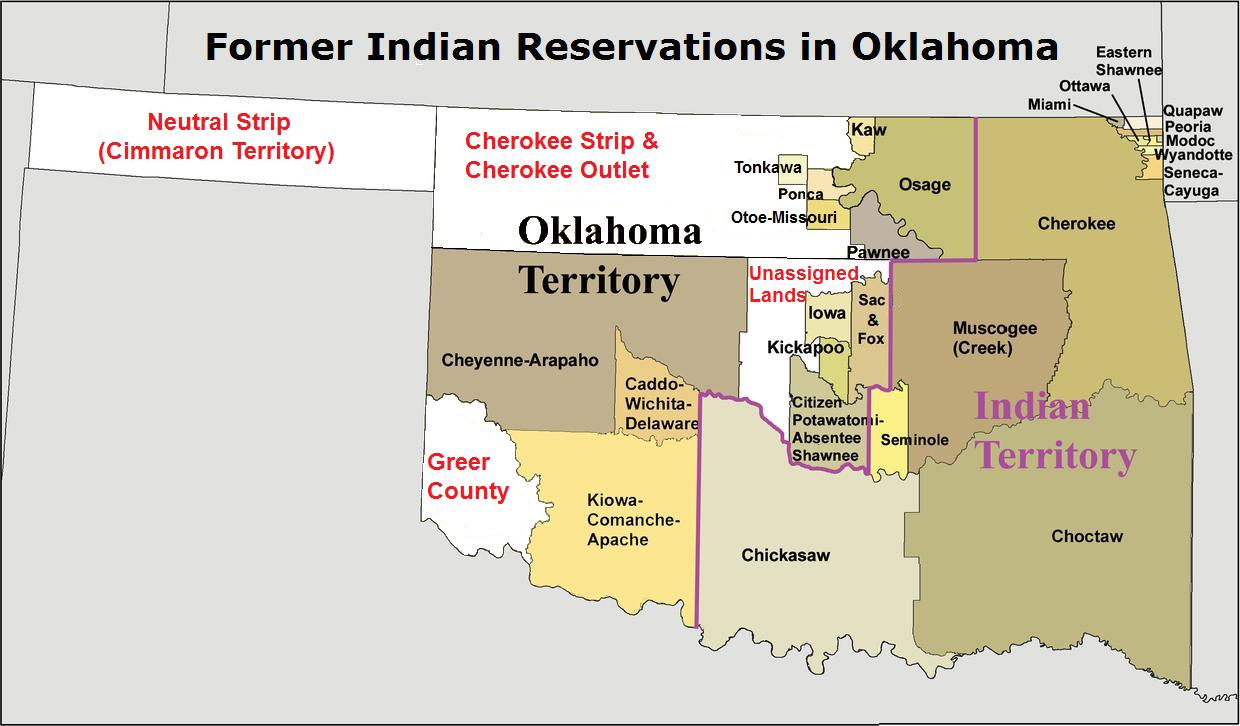
Oklahoma, the Cherokee Outlet, and Indian reservations established in the state and in the Cherokee Outlet.

The Cherokee Outlet, or Cherokee Strip (Cherokee: ᏅᏓᏱᎸᎢ, romanized: nudayilvi), was located in the northern part of what is now the state of Oklahoma. It was a 60-mile-wide (97-kilometer) parcel of land south of the Oklahoma–Kansas border between 96 and 100°W. The Cherokee Outlet was created in 1834 from a treaty signed at Fort Gibson the previous year.

The United States forced the Cherokee Nation of Indians to cede to the United States all lands east of the Mississippi River in exchange for a reservation and an "outlet" in Indian Territory (later Oklahoma). At the time of its creation, the Cherokee Outlet was about 225 miles (362 km) long. The cities of Enid, Woodward, Ponca City, and Perry were later founded within the boundaries of what had been the Cherokee Outlet.

The first section of land called the Cherokee Strip was a 2.5-mile (4.0 km)-wide piece of land running along the northern border of the Cherokee Outlet and in extreme southern Kansas. It was the result of the Osage Reservation's southern border and the language of the Fort Gibson Treaty of 1833 that involved the Cherokee Nation.

The 1833 treaty reads, in part:

[...] thence up said Grand river [the Neosho] as far as the S. line of the Osage reservation, extended if necessary; thence up and between said S. Osage line, extended W. if necessary [...]
—excerpt from Treaty of Fort Gibson, 1833

Although the Osage Reservation was close to the southern extent of the State of Kansas, formed long after the Fort Gibson treaty, it was unexpectedly a little ways north of the 37th parallel north. Maps of the era conflated the two.

When Nebraska and Kansas were surveyed around 1861 by Mark W. Delahay and others, the Osage Reservation was found to be entirely within Kansas, but the borders did not coincide with each other. The gap between the Osage lands and Kansas border could finally be determined by an accurate survey, which began for this region around 1867. It was an obscure fact that would not come into play until after the Osages left their reserve around 1871, when the lands in southern Kansas were being surveyed and patented by white settlers.

This 2 or 3 mile gap produced the Cherokee Strip— lands which were in Kansas but originally part of the Cherokee Outlet. The white citizens of Kansas wanted this strip of land, which resulted in a windfall for the Cherokees, as they were guaranteed a $1 per acre payment, as required in Article 17 of the July 19, 1866 treaty. Because of the mixup and all of the land cessions of the Osages, land patents in places like Montgomery County, Kansas ended up with several different sources: the Osage Diminished Reserve, Osage Ceded Lands, Osage Trust Lands, and Cherokee Strip Lands for property close to the Oklahoma border.

The whole of the Cherokee Outlet (60-miles wide) was later often called the Cherokee Strip.

== Creation ==
In 1834, the treaty between the Cherokees and the United States obligated the Cherokees to move west of the Mississippi River to lands assigned them in Indian Territory (later Oklahoma). Their new lands included a 7.0-million-acre reservation and "a perpetual outlet west...as far west as the sovereignty of the United States" extended. The parcel of land extending west from the Cherokee reservation became known as the Cherokee Outlet.

In 1838, in what is called the Cherokee removal or Trail of Tears, most of the Cherokees, living primarily in northern Georgia, were forcibly relocated to Indian territory and their new lands. A census in 1835 had counted 16,500 Cherokees. They were destined for the main reservation guaranteed in 1833, not the Cherokee Outlet which remained virtually uninhabited for decades afterward.

It was not until the 1870s until the Cherokee Outlet got a substantial number of settlers.

== Civil war and its aftermath ==
The Cherokee Outlet was seldom used for decades after its creation. The Cherokees were farmers rather than ranchers or hunters, but the nomadic and warlike Plains Indians recognized no ownership of the outlet except by themselves, and used the outlet for hunting. They resisted encroachments on their range, whether by white intruders or other Indians. Consequently, only a few Cherokees took advantage of the outlet to the west of their homes for hunting or to graze cattle. With the coming of the American Civil War in 1861, the Cherokees and other Indians living in Indian Territory were divided between support for the Union and the Confederate States of America. A substantial number of Cherokees were slave owners. The census of 1835 counted 1,592 slaves among the Cherokees and 7.4% of Cherokees were slave owners. The attraction of Cherokees toward the Confederacy was magnified by a statement in fall 1860 by William Seward, a prominent supporter of Unionist presidential candidate Abraham Lincoln, who said that the Cherokees and other Indians should be expelled from Indian Territory and relocated.

After the American Civil War, the United States demanded a new treaty (see Reconstruction Treaties) to punish the Cherokees because of the support of many of them for the Confederacy. The new treaty (ratified on July 19, 1866) required the Cherokee to sell land in the Cherokee Outlet to other Indian tribes and to allow them to move into and live in the Outlet. The price for the land was to be negotiated with the U.S. president deciding on a price if one could not be agreed to by the Cherokee and the Indian tribes wishing to buy the land.

Meanwhile, the Indian peoples in neighboring Kansas came under intense pressure from the U.S. government and White settlers. With new lands available to them in the Cherokee Outlet, the various Indian people living in Kansas were induced by the U.S. to sell their lands and to purchase new lands in the Cherokee Outlet. The Osage moved to lands (now Osage County, Oklahoma) in the Cherokee Outlet in 1872, followed shortly by the Kaw, Nez Perce, Otoe-Missouria, Pawnee, Ponca, and Tonkawa. The Osage had enough in funds (managed by the U.S. government) to pay for their new lands in the Cherokee Outlet; the U.S. government failed to pay for the land sold to the other tribes until the 1880s, and then paid less than the price asked by the Cherokees.

The practical impact of this settlement of non-Cherokee Indians in the eastern portion of the Cherokee Outlet was to cut the Cherokee off from easy access to the western part of the outlet, thus making it "virtually useless" to them.

== Cattle grazing ==
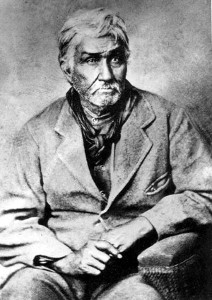
Jesse Chisholm, a mixed-blood Cherokee, pioneered cattle drives through the Cherokee Outlet.

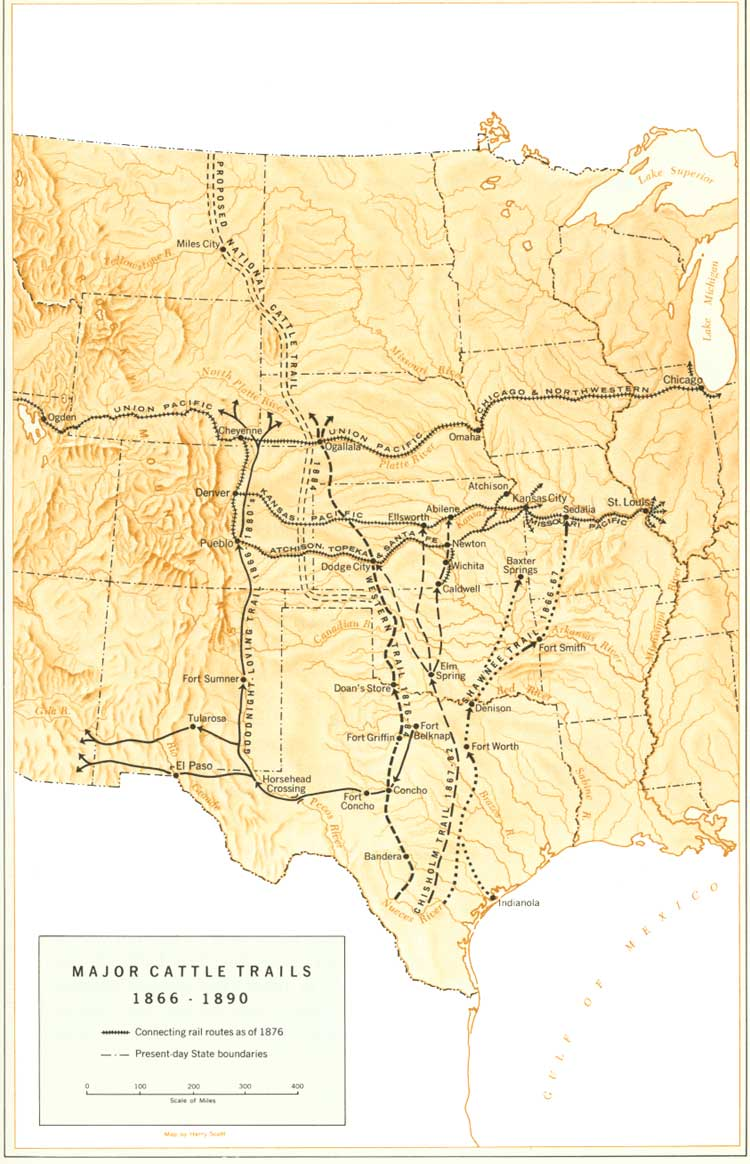
Most of the cattle drives going north from Texas passed through the Cherokee Outlet.

In 1865, mixed-blood Cherokee Jesse Chisholm laid out the Chisholm Trail from Texas to Kansas, and the next year, the first large cattle herd was driven through the Cherokee Outlet from Texas to the railroad in Abilene, Kansas. The Chisholm Trail passed through the present city of Enid and entered Kansas near Caldwell. Cattle drives following the Chisholm Trail, and numerous side trails continued to pass through the outlet for the next 20 years. The Cherokees collected, but with difficulty, 10 cents per head of cattle passing through the outlet.

The Texans began to halt in the outlet to graze and winter their cattle. Ranchers in Kansas also began to use the outlet for grazing their herds. The Cherokees attempted to collect fees for grazing rights, which were confirmed by the U.S. Senate in 1878, but collection of the fees was difficult. In 1880, cattlemen, mostly Kansans, formed the Cherokee Strip Livestock Association to manage a chaotic situation in the outlet. After the incorporation of the association in Kansas in 1883, the Cherokees negotiated a five-year lease of the outlet to the association for $100,000 per year. At the end of five years, the Cherokee Tribal Council put the lease up for bid, hoping to get a better price, and leased it again to the Cherokee Strip Livestock Association for $200,000 annually. The more than 100 members of the Livestock Association divided up the land, erecting fences and corrals and building ranch houses.

Also during the 1880s, Captain Bill McDonald, acting as deputy U.S. marshal for the Southern District of Kansas and the Northern District of Texas, cleared the Cherokee Outlet of cattle thieves and train robbers, who had taken to hiding out in what they thought was a kind of "no-man's land".

== Boomers ==
The lease to the Cherokee Strip Livestock Association was nullified by Congress in 1890, which then authorized purchasing the land from the Cherokees for $1.25 per acre. Having previously rejected a bid from the cattlemen to buy the land for $3.00 per acre, the Cherokee protested in vain that the government price was too low. President Benjamin Harrison forbade all grazing in the Cherokee Outlet after October 2, 1890, which eliminated all profit from leasing the land. After that, the Cherokee sold off the land at prices ranging from $1.40 to $2.50 per acre. The Cherokee Strip Live Stock Association disbanded in 1893, the same year the outlet was opened to non-Indian settlement.

Actual payment did not occur until 1964, when the Cherokee finally settled their claims against the U.S. government for the actual value of the Cherokee Strip land opened to settlement in 1893. This amounted to about $14.7 million, which was paid to the original allotment holders or their heirs. The tribe also received an additional $2 million in accrued interest.

The Organic Act of 1890 incorporated the unassigned lands into the new Oklahoma Territory. Oklahoma became the 46th state on November 16, 1907.

== Cherokee Strip land run ==
In 1889, Congress authorized the Cherokee Commission to persuade the Cherokee to cede their complete title to the Cherokee Outlet. After a great amount of pressure, and confirmed by a treaty Congress approved March 17, 1893, the Cherokee agreed, for "the sum of $8,595,736.12, over and above all other sums" to turn title over to the United States government. On September 16, 1893, the eastern end of the Cherokee Outlet was settled in the Cherokee Strip land run, the largest land run in the United States and possibly the largest event of its kind in history.

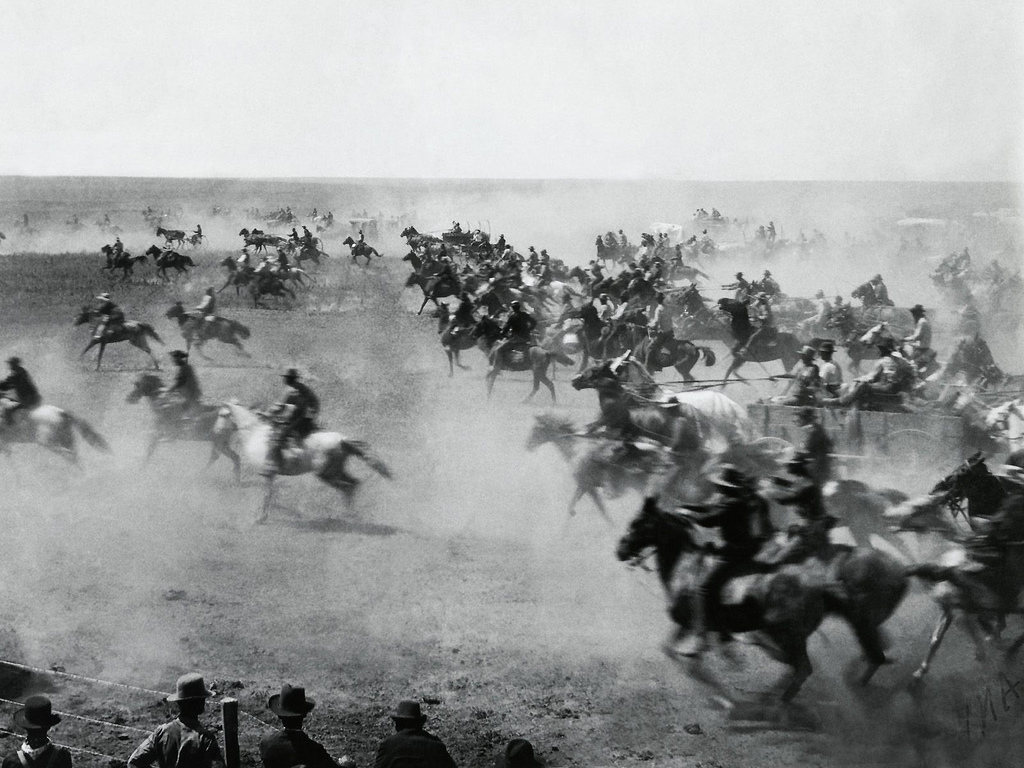
Photograph of the land rush by William S. Prettyman who participated in it and served as a mayor of Blackwell

== In popular fiction ==
The Cherokee Outlet and the actions of the cattlemen play a prominent role in a portion of the Matt Braun Western novel The Kincaids. The names of the characters have been changed, but the basic actions taken are explored. The 1897 land run serves as the setting of films such as 1925's Tumbleweeds starting William S. Hart and 1939's The Oklahoma Kid starring James Cagney and Humphrey Bogart. In Mark Twain's 1896 comic novel The American Claimant, the naive character Washington Hawkins arrives in Washington, D.C., upon being appointed the Congressional delegate for the Cherokee Strip.
