= Unassigned Lands =

Lands in Oklahoma that were not assigned to any native tribes

- Homestead
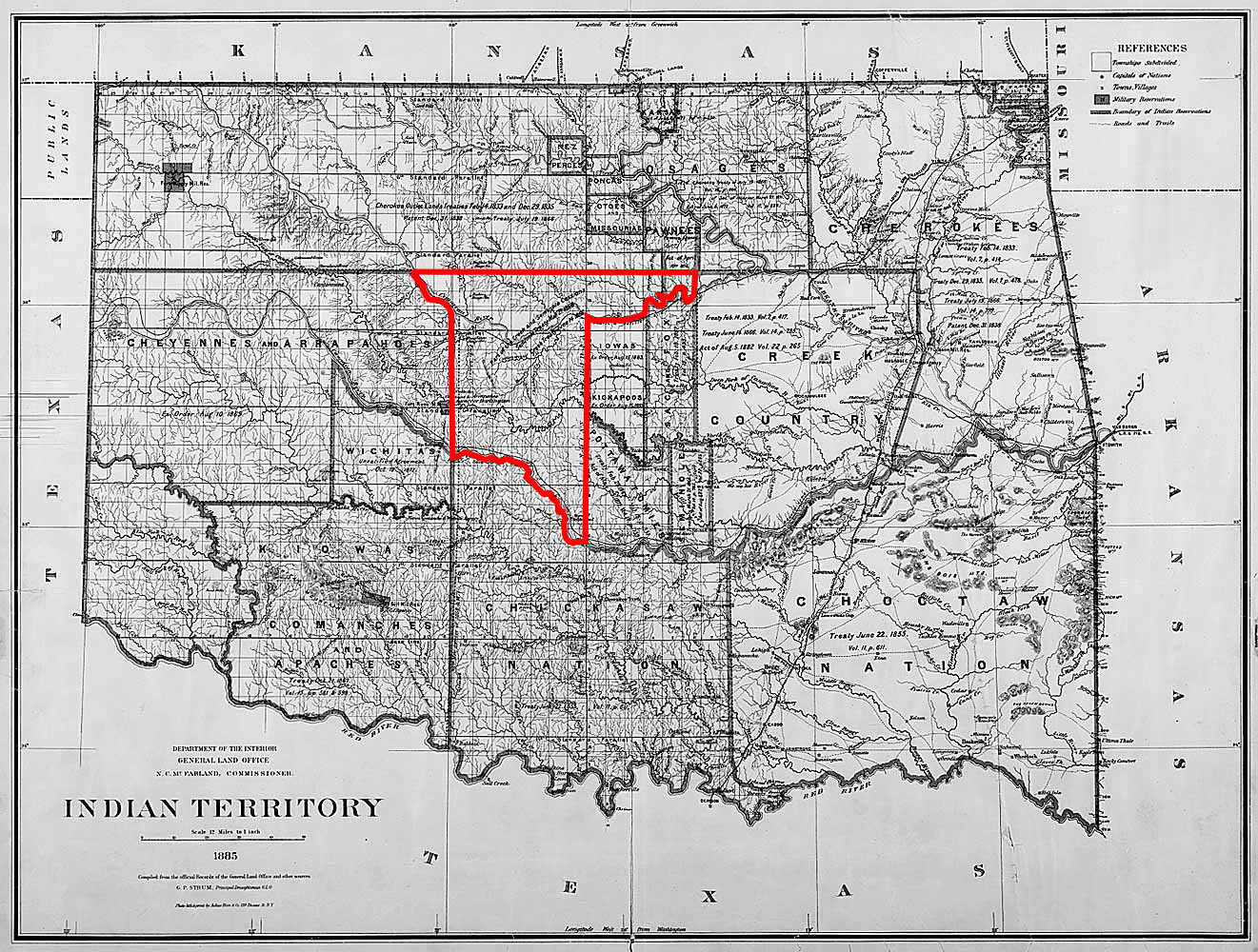
- Map of the Unassigned Lands—1885
- Country: United States
- State: Oklahoma
- Counties: Canadian, Cleveland, Kingfisher, Logan, Oklahoma, Payne
- Oklahoma Territory: May 2, 1890 – Organic Act

Area
  - Total: 1,887,796.47 acres (763,964.13 ha)
  - Land: 2,949 sq mi (7,640 km^{2})

The Unassigned Lands in Oklahoma were in the center of the lands ceded to the United States by the Creek (Muskogee) and Seminole Indians following the Civil War and on which no other tribes had been settled. By 1883, it was bounded by the Cherokee Outlet on the north, several relocated Indian reservations on the east, the Chickasaw lands on the south, and the Cheyenne-Arapaho reserve on the west. The area amounted to 1,887,796.47 acres (2,950 sq mi; 7,640 km^{2}).

In 1889, this territory was offered by the federal government to non-Native Americans for settlement in the Oklahoma Land Rush.

== Indian era ==
The Treaty of Indian Springs, February 12, 1825, provided for a delegation of Creeks to visit the west in order that

they may select any other territory, west of the Mississippi, on Red, Canadian, Arkansas, or Missouri Rivers

to replace their lands in Georgia. A dispute arose between the Lower Creek Council, which signed the treaty, and the Upper Creek Council, which objected. The dispute led to the killing of General William McIntosh, the chief of the Lower Creeks, and left the treaty in doubt. Despite that, the Creeks were relocated to the west. On February 14, 1833, the Treaty of Okmulgee was signed at Fort Gibson. In it the Creeks finally agreed to cede their lands in the east. Article 2 of the 1833 treaty defined the land chosen under the 1825 treaty as being west and south of the Cherokee lands and bordering the Canadian River on the south and what was then the Mexican border on the west.

In the Seminole Treaty signed March 28, 1833, but not ratified, the Seminole agreed to settle on the Little River portion of the Creek lands in Indian Territory. Some Seminole moved but the rest retreated within Florida. The US tried again to remove them, resulting in the Second Seminole War. After the Second War, most of the Seminole moved to the Indian Territory. A treaty between the Creek and the Seminole tribes, ratified August 16, 1856, by the US Senate, gave the Seminole the agreed-upon tract of Creek land between the Canadian River on the south and the North Fork of the Canadian River on the north.

The divisions within the Creek people continued up through the Civil War. The Council, then under control of the Lower Creek, signed a treaty of support with the Confederacy on July 10, 1861. Creek support for the South was not unanimous, however. After a series of armed confrontations, Opothleyahola's pro-Union Creeks, belonging mostly to the Upper Creek, were driven into Kansas during the winter of 1861–62. They suffered a huge loss of life, as did their limited number of Seminole allies under Halleck Tustenuggee.

When the Confederacy lost the Civil War, the United States forced the Creek nation into a new treaty, and forced them to cede some lands in compensation for having supported the wrong side. Under Article 3 of the 1866 Creek Treaty, the Creek agreed to cede the western portion of their lands

In compliance with the desire of the United States to locate other Indians and freedmen thereon, the Creeks hereby cede and convey to the United States, to be sold to and used as homes for such other civilized Indians as the United States may choose to settle thereon ... the west half of their entire domain ... [for] ... the sum of thirty (30) cents per acre ($74.13/km^{2}), amounting to nine hundred and seventy-five thousand one hundred and sixty-eight dollars ...

The Seminoles' active support of the Confederacy cost them much more land than it did the Creeks. Article 3 of the Seminole Treaty, ratified July 19, 1866, required that

the Seminoles cede and convey to the United States their entire domain ... [for] ... the sum of three hundred and twenty-five thousand three hundred and sixty-two ($325,362) dollars, said purchase being at the rate of fifteen cents per acre ($37.07/km^{2}).

By the same treaty, the Seminole were the first tribe relocated to the ceded Creek land. Several tribes of Eastern Indians were also moved to the eastern end of the ceded Creek land. The Absentee Shawnee and Citizen Band of Pottawatomi shared a reserve; also, the Sac and Fox. Later, the Kickapoo were moved in and, lastly, the Iowa. The combined Cheyenne Arapaho tribe was given the western end of the Creek and Seminole land, along with some land ceded from the other tribes. Most of the former Creek and Seminole land, as was true for the rest of central and western Indian Territory, was already leased from the Indian tribes for grazing by large cattle ranching companies.

== Pro-settlement campaign ==
During the Choctaw-Chickasaw Treaty negotiations of 1866, the Principal Chief of the Choctaws, Allen Wright, coined the term Oklahoma and suggested it as the name for all of Indian Territory.

— Oklahoma Historical Society

In about 1879, Elias C. Boudinot began a campaign, perhaps at the behest of one of his clients, the M–K–T Railroad, to open the land "unoccupied by any Indian" to settlement by non-Indians. He pointed out in a letter published in 1879 that four of the Five Civilized Tribes, unlike the Cherokee, had extinguished their complete title to the lands ceded following the Civil War and received full payment.

He also said:

Whatever may have been the desire or intention of the United States Government in 1866 to locate Indians and negroes upon these lands, it is certain that no such desire or intention exists in 1879. The Negro since that date, has become a citizen of the United States, and Congress has recently enacted laws which practically forbid the removal of any more Indians into the Territory.

He suggested that the area was now Public Land and suggested the names "Unassigned Lands" and "Oklahoma" for the district.

In an attempt to prevent encroachment, President Rutherford B. Hayes issued a proclamation on April 26, 1879, forbidding trespass into the area

which Territory is designated, organized, and described by treaties and laws of the United States and by executive authorities as the Indian's country ...

It was too late. Almost immediately speculators and landless citizens began organizing and agitating for the opening of the land to settlement. The newspapers generally referred to these pro-settlement forces as Boomers and followed Boudinot's lead in referring to the area as the Unassigned Lands or Oklahoma.

The Boomers planned excursions, which they called raids, into the area and surveyed townsites, built homes, and planted crops. The United States sent troops to round them up and expel them. The raids continued for several years. The Boomers tried to get a legal opinion as to the status of the public lands, but the government, instead of charging them for illegal settlement of Indian land, charged them only under the Intercourse Act. Finally, in United States vs. Payne in 1884, the United States District Court at Topeka, Kansas ruled that settling on the Unassigned Lands was not a criminal offense.

The government refused to accept the decision and continued to raid the squatters. Finally General Pleasant Porter, the Creek Council's delegate to Washington, offered to relinquish all Creek claims to that part of the ceded territory which remained unassigned. On January 31, 1889, the United States and the Creek agreed to quit any claims to title of the land. The Creek received approximately $2,250,000.

== Settlement and statehood ==
The Springer Amendment was immediately added to the Indian Appropriation Act of 1889 to authorize settlement under the provisions of the Homestead Act of 1862. The amendment, however, denied the settlers their squatter's rights. The lands were to be settled by a land run. The original settlers were rounded up and expelled.

On April 22, 1889, the Oklahoma lands were settled by what would later be called the Run of '89. Over 50,000 people entered on the first day, among them several thousand freedmen and descendants of slaves. Tent cities were erected overnight at Oklahoma City, Kingfisher, El Reno, Norman, Guthrie and Stillwater, which was the first of the settlements.

Federal troops of the United States Army provided law enforcement; the closest criminal and civil jurisdictions were the federal courts of the United States District Court for the Western District of Arkansas, with its courthouse centered in the border town to the east of Fort Smith, Arkansas. Despite that, the district and territory was generally peaceful with its longtime infamous federal judge Isaac C. Parker (1838–1896), and a posse of his United States deputy marshals. Most land disputes were settled without bloodshed, although a few took years to resolve.

The passage of the Organic Act of 1890 by the United States Congress, signed by 23rd President Benjamin Harrison (1833–1901, served 1889–1893), incorporated the former western Unassigned Lands into the newly organized federal Oklahoma Territory, (which endured 17 years until 46th statehood in 1907). Under the congressional act, local officials were appointed to handle civil and criminal matters until elections were held. Under the later Curtis Act of 1898, the communal lands of the Five Civilized Tribes in the adjacent Indian Territory to the east, were allocated to registered heads of households, thus extinguishing tribal title. The federal government declared any excess lands as "surplus" and allowed sale to non-Native Americans. In 1907, the new State of Oklahoma (the merger of the full Indian Territory and former Oklahoma Territory areas) was admitted as the 46th state in the American Union.
