= Chisholm Trail Museum =

Chisholm Trail Museum may refer to:

- Chisholm Trail Museum (Wellington, Kansas)
- Chisholm Trail Museum (Kingfisher, Oklahoma)
- Chisholm Trail Outdoor Museum (Cleburne, Texas)

== See also ==
- Chisholm Trail Heritage Center, in Duncan, Oklahoma
- Chisholm Trail Historical Museum, in Waurika, Oklahoma
