= Eastern Oklahoma Railway =

Former railway in Oklahoma

Overview
- Locale: Oklahoma
- Dates of operation: 1899–1907

Technical
- Track gauge: 4 ft 8 1/2 in (1,435 mm)
- Length: 477 mi (768 km)

The Eastern Oklahoma Railway was incorporated under the laws of Oklahoma Territory on July 24, 1899. The railroad constructed much of its own track. This included Guthrie junction (Eastern Oklahoma junction) to Cushing junction, 47.9 miles, in the 1900-1902 timeframe; Ripley to Esau Junction (passing through Pawnee), 40.4 miles, also in the 1900-1902 timeframe; Newkirk to Pauls Valley (via Ralston, Cushing and Shawnee), 182.5 miles, in the 1900-1904 timeframe; and, Davis to Sulphur, 9.3 miles, in 1906.

But the railroad also acquired a number of other lines. Purchases included the Guthrie and Western Railway, which had a line from Seward to Cashion, 10.6 miles, acquired on June 16, 1902; the Kiowa, Chickasha and Fort Smith Railway, which had a line from Pauls Valley to Lindsay, 24.2 miles, acquired on March 14, 1904; and, the Denver, Enid and Gulf Railroad, which had constructed line from Guthrie to the Oklahoma-Kansas state line near Kiowa, Kansas, 112.1 miles, acquired on May 22, 1907.

The railroad was operated by the Atchison, Topeka and Santa Fe Railway (AT&SF) from its opening day of January 1, 1900. It was sold to the AT&SF, which owned all its capital stock, on June 20, 1907, at which point it had about 477 miles of track. The sale had been previously approved by Congress.

Much of the trackage has since been abandoned.
