= Cashion, Oklahoma =

- Town
- Cashion's post office

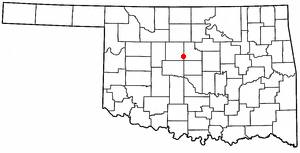
- Location of Cashion, Oklahoma
- Coordinates: 35°48′03″N 97°40′37″W
- Country: United States
- State: Oklahoma
- Counties: Kingfisher, Logan

Area
  - Total: 1.31 sq mi (3.38 km^{2})
  - Land: 1.31 sq mi (3.38 km^{2})
  - Water: 0 sq mi (0.00 km^{2})
- Elevation: 1,129 ft (344 m)

Population (2020)
  - Total: 850
  - Density: 652.0/sq mi (251.74/km^{2})
- Time zone: UTC-6 (Central (CST))
  - Summer (DST): UTC-5 (CDT)
- ZIP code: 73016
- Area codes: 405/572
- FIPS code: 40-12650
- GNIS feature ID: 2413177
- Website: www.cashionok.org

Cashion is a town in Kingfisher and Logan counties in the U.S. state of Oklahoma. The Logan County portion of Cashion is part of the Oklahoma City Metropolitan Statistical Area. The population was 850 as of the 2020 United States census, up 6% from the 802 reported at the 2010 census.

== History ==
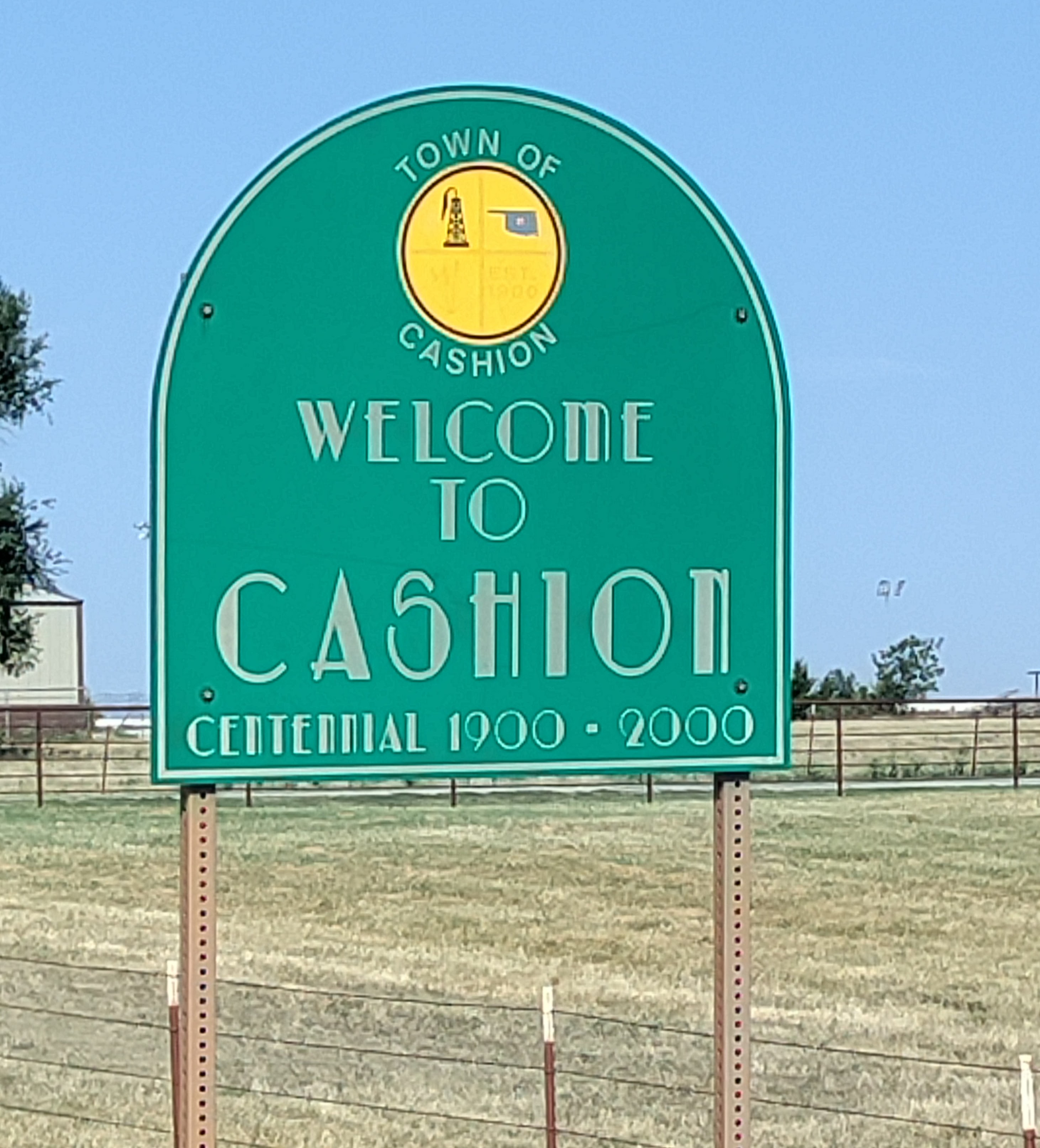
The welcome sign in Cashion

Cashion began as the town of Downs, Oklahoma on a hill 3 miles (5 km) south of the Cimarron River. The Oklahoma legislature had once passed a bill to make Downs the capitol of Oklahoma Territory, but the bill was vetoed a few days later by George W. Steele, the first governor of the territory. Once when later Governor Abraham Jefferson Seay was on the road and spent the night in Downs, the townspeople claimed they were the capitol for that night because the governor had the Great Seal of Oklahoma Territory with him at the time.

In 1900, the Guthrie and Kingfisher Railway (later part of the Rock Island Railroad), which was building east from Kingfisher, and the Guthrie and Western Railway (an affiliate of the Santa Fe Railroad), which was building west from Seward, agreed to connect at a point a half-mile south of Downs. The site was on land owned by the Guthrie & Kingfisher Improvement Company, which sold lots, with the area becoming the town of Cashion. Since supplies to Downs had up to this point only been moved by wagons, the merchants in Downs, wanting to be on the rail line, relocated to Cashion along with most of the residences, leaving the former Downs site as agricultural land.

Cashion was named for Roy Cashion of Hennessey, Oklahoma. Roy, a graduate of the Hennessy Class of 1897, had a strong passion and belief in the freedom of the Cuban people. His graduation speech was entitled "Liberty for Cuba". When the territorial governor asked for volunteers, Cashion's name was first one on the list. He passed through this area on his way to join Teddy Roosevelt's Rough Riders in the Spanish–American War. On July 1, 1898, Cashion was killed by a gunshot to the head in the famous charge on San Juan Hill in Cuba. He is believed to be the first Oklahoman to die in battle on foreign soil.

Incorporated in Oklahoma Territory in 1901, Cashion experienced a boom. Its growth peaked by 1915 and 1916. At this time, two railroads were running two trains a day into town from both Guthrie (the Santa Fe) and Kingfisher (the Rock Island). An oil boom brought in the "Cashion Pool", which was considered the largest single pool ever discovered. It ran from south of Cashion to just west of Enid.

Cashion was known as "The Town Too Tough to Die". While the neighboring towns of Downs, Wandell, Big Four, Lockridge, Navina, Reeding, Columbia and Lincoln Town all folded up and vanished in the Great Depression or shortly thereafter, Cashion hung on. However, the population declined as farms failed in the surrounding area. The Santa Fe Railroad abandoned its line in 1934, and the Rock Island removed its track in 1937. The population dropped from 291 in 1930 to 232 in 1940, then to its all-time low of 182 in 1950.

A resurgent economy created more jobs in nearby Guthrie and Kingfisher, causing new residents to move into Cashion. In 1960, the census recorded 221 residents. The 1970 census recorded 329. The 2020 census reports the population of the town as 850.

In August 2020, Cashion made national news after a police officer, Charlie Missinne, tasered 65 year old Debra Hamil after a traffic stop for a broken car light. Hamil was said by the officer to be "resisting arrest" The woman later accepted a plea bargain for misdemeanor charges of "resisting an officer, obstruction, eluding and officer and operating a vehicle with defective equipment."

== Geography ==
Cashion is located in southeastern Kingfisher County with the town limits extending east into Logan County. It is 18 miles (29 km) east-southeast of Kingfisher and the same distance southwest of Guthrie.

According to the United States Census Bureau, Cashion has a total area of 1.7 square miles (4.4 km^{2}), of which 1.9 acres (7,576 m^{2}), or 0.17%, are water.

== Demographics ==
Historical population
Census	Pop.	Note	%±
1910	289		—
1920	296		2.4%
1930	291		−1.7%
1940	232		−20.3%
1950	182		−21.6%
1960	221		21.4%
1970	329		48.9%
1980	547		66.3%
1990	430		−21.4%
2000	635		47.7%
2010	802		26.3%
2020	850		6.0%
U.S. Decennial Census

=== 2020 census ===
As of the 2020 census, Cashion had a population of 850. The median age was 33.6 years. 30.8% of residents were under the age of 18 and 11.9% of residents were 65 years of age or older. For every 100 females there were 97.7 males, and for every 100 females age 18 and over there were 94.1 males age 18 and over.

0.0% of residents lived in urban areas, while 100.0% lived in rural areas.

There were 318 households in Cashion, of which 49.1% had children under the age of 18 living in them. Of all households, 55.0% were married-couple households, 14.5% were households with a male householder and no spouse or partner present, and 25.2% were households with a female householder and no spouse or partner present. About 20.1% of all households were made up of individuals and 7.5% had someone living alone who was 65 years of age or older.

There were 358 housing units, of which 11.2% were vacant. The homeowner vacancy rate was 1.2% and the rental vacancy rate was 12.9%.

Racial composition as of the 2020 census
Race	Number	Percent
White	668	78.6%
Black or African American	3	0.4%
American Indian and Alaska Native	48	5.6%
Asian	1	0.1%
Native Hawaiian and Other Pacific Islander	0	0.0%
Some other race	14	1.6%
Two or more races	116	13.6%
Hispanic or Latino (of any race)	55	6.5%

=== 2000 census ===
As of the census of 2000, there were 635 people, 238 households, and 177 families residing in the town. The population density was 578.7 inhabitants per square mile (223.4/km^{2}). There were 262 housing units at an average density of 238.8 per square mile (92.2/km^{2}). The racial makeup of the town was 95.28% White, 0.16% African American, 1.73% Native American, 0.16% from other races, and 2.68% from two or more races. Hispanic or Latino of any race were 4.09% of the population.

There were 238 households, out of which 45.0% had children under the age of 18 living with them, 55.5% were married couples living together, 12.2% had a female householder with no husband present, and 25.6% were non-families. 24.8% of all households were made up of individuals, and 10.9% had someone living alone who was 65 years of age or older. The average household size was 2.67 and the average family size was 3.18.

In the town, the population was spread out, with 32.1% under the age of 18, 6.8% from 18 to 24, 29.0% from 25 to 44, 21.3% from 45 to 64, and 10.9% who were 65 years of age or older. The median age was 35 years. For every 100 females, there were 97.8 males. For every 100 females age 18 and over, there were 93.3 males.

The median income for a household in the town was $37,500, and the median income for a family was $44,844. Males had a median income of $31,012 versus $25,729 for females. The per capita income for the town was $16,513. About 11.4% of families and 15.6% of the population were below the poverty line, including 23.4% of those under age 18 and 24.6% of those age 65 or over.
