= Kingfisher County, Oklahoma =

County in Oklahoma, United States

- County
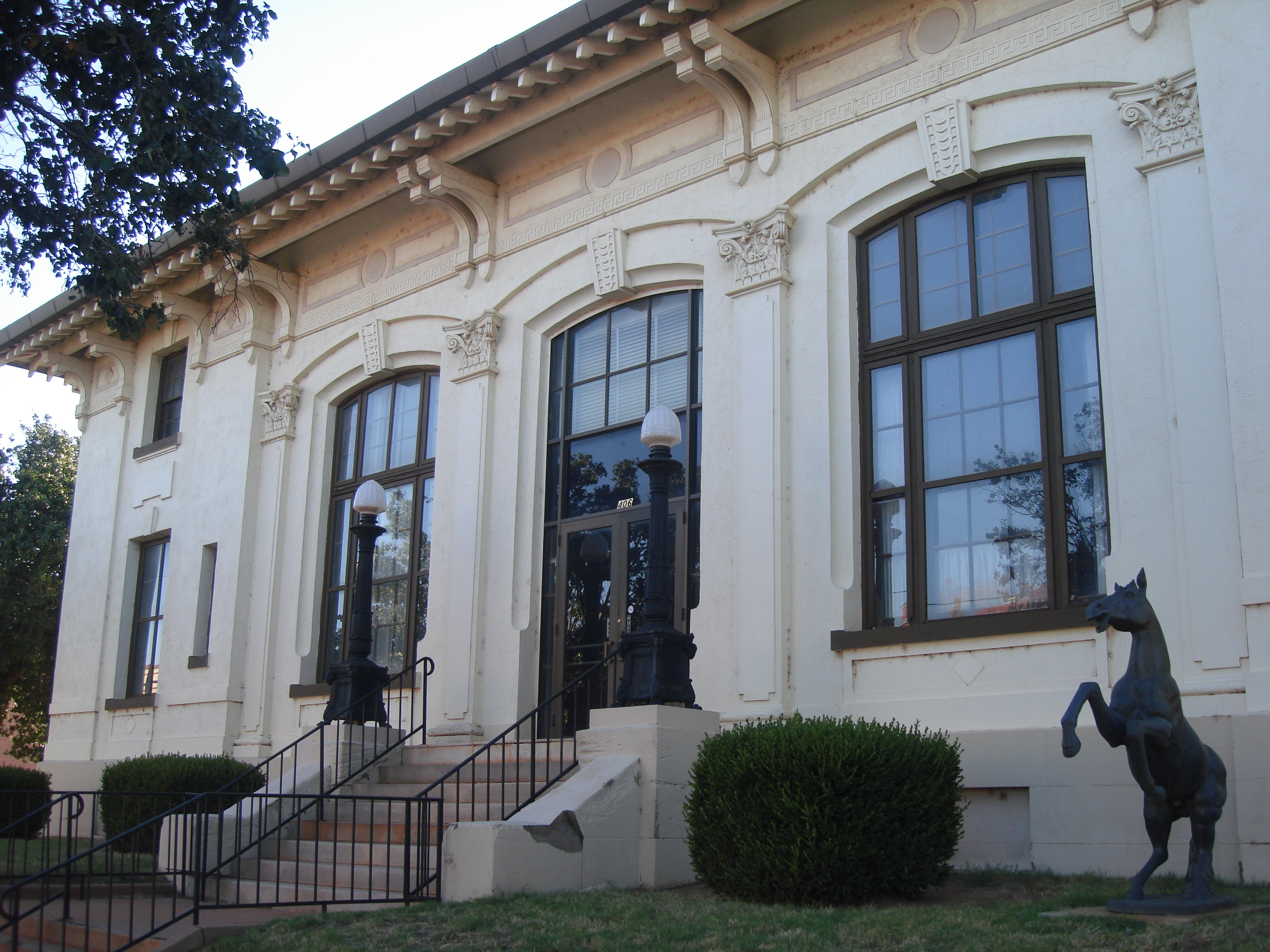
- Post Office in Kingfisher (2014)

- Location within the U.S. state of Oklahoma
- Coordinates: 35°56′N 97°56′W
- Country: United States
- State: Oklahoma
- Founded: May 2, 1890
- Seat: Kingfisher
- Largest city: Kingfisher

Area
  - Total: 906 sq mi (2,350 km^{2})
  - Land: 898 sq mi (2,330 km^{2})
  - Water: 7.9 sq mi (20 km^{2}) 0.9%

Population (2020)
  - Total: 15,184
  - Estimate (2025): 15,795 ▲
  - Density: 16.9/sq mi (6.53/km^{2})
- Time zone: UTC−6 (Central)
  - Summer (DST): UTC−5 (CDT)
- Congressional district: 3rd
- Website: https://kingfisher.okcounties.org/

Kingfisher County is a county located in the U.S. state of Oklahoma. As of the 2020 census, the population was 15,184. Its county seat is Kingfisher. The county was formed in 1890 and named Kingfisher by a vote of residents.

The land was given to the Creek Nation by the federal government, but was taken back after the American Civil War.

== History ==
Limited archaeological surveys may have discovered evidence of pre-contact peoples, including Paleo-Indian and Archaic (6000 BC - 1 AD) groups that used the area for hunting and foraging. The historic Osage, Cheyenne, and Comanche tribes traversed the prairie grasslands of this area.

Before the county's creation, The Chisholm Trail's many routes crossed the area. A stage road which paralleled the trail had important stops at Dover Station, King Fisher Station and Baker Station.

The area was given to the Creek Nation by the federal government after their forced removal from Georgia. At the end of the American Civil War, the Creeks were forced to cede the land back to the federal government for siding with the Confederacy. It became part of the Unassigned Lands, and the area was opened to non-Indian settlement in the land run on April 22, 1889. Several towns, including Kingfisher, Oklahoma developed soon after the land run.

Originally this area was called County 5, when the Organic Act of May 2, 1890, created Oklahoma Territory. At an August 5, 1890, election, the voters of County 5 overwhelmingly voted for the name "Kingfisher" over "Hennessey" and "Harrison". The origin of the name is unclear. The Encyclopedia of Oklahoma History and Culture mentions three different possibilities. The first is that the name memorialized a local rancher, David King Fisher. The second version is that King and Fisher were two different settlers, whose names were combined for the county and town. The third explanation was that the name was for a rancher named John Fisher and for whom Uncle Johns Creek was named.

In November 2022, four Chinese citizens were shot and killed and a fifth person wounded at a licensed medical marijuana grow operation on a 10-acre farm west of Hennessey, near the unincorporated community of Lacey. Local reporting described armed guards regularly posted outside the facility, and the publisher of a nearby community newspaper said the mail carrier frequently encountered armed guards with guns while delivering mail to the property.

== Geography ==
According to the U.S. Census Bureau, the county has a total area of 906 square miles (2,350 km^{2}), of which 898 square miles (2,330 km^{2}) is land and 7.9 square miles (20 km^{2}) (0.9%) is water. The principal waterway is the Cimarron River, which runs from northwest to east through the county.

=== Major highways ===
- U.S. Highway 81
- State Highway 3
- State Highway 33
- State Highway 51
- State Highway 74F
- State Highway 132

=== Adjacent counties ===
- Garfield County (north)
- Logan County (east)
- Canadian County (south)
- Blaine County (west)
- Major County (northwest)
- Oklahoma County (southeast)

== Demographics ==
Historical population
| Census | Pop. | Note | %± |
|---|---|---|---|
| 1910 | 18,825 | | — |
| 1920 | 15,671 | | −16.8% |
| 1930 | 15,960 | | 1.8% |
| 1940 | 15,617 | | −2.1% |
| 1950 | 12,860 | | −17.7% |
| 1960 | 10,635 | | −17.3% |
| 1970 | 12,857 | | 20.9% |
| 1980 | 14,187 | | 10.3% |
| 1990 | 13,212 | | −6.9% |
| 2000 | 13,926 | | 5.4% |
| 2010 | 15,034 | | 8.0% |
| 2020 | 15,184 | | 1.0% |
| 2025 (est.) | 15,795 | ▲ | 4.0% |
U.S. Decennial Census; 1790-1960 1900-1990; 1990-2000 2010

=== 2020 census ===
As of the 2020 United States census, the county had a population of 15,184. Of the residents, 26.6% were under the age of 18 and 17.4% were 65 years of age or older; the median age was 38.7 years. For every 100 females there were 98.0 males, and for every 100 females age 18 and over there were 96.9 males.

The racial makeup of the county was 76.7% White, 1.2% Black or African American, 3.1% American Indian and Alaska Native, 0.3% Asian, 8.4% from some other race, and 10.3% from two or more races. Hispanic or Latino residents of any race comprised 18.1% of the population.

There were 5,624 households in the county, of which 36.2% had children under the age of 18 living with them and 21.7% had a female householder with no spouse or partner present. About 24.2% of all households were made up of individuals and 12.2% had someone living alone who was 65 years of age or older.

There were 6,394 housing units, of which 12.0% were vacant. Among occupied housing units, 77.5% were owner-occupied and 22.5% were renter-occupied. The homeowner vacancy rate was 2.2% and the rental vacancy rate was 13.0%.

=== 2000 census ===
As of the census of 2000, there were 13,926 people, 5,247 households, and 3,893 families residing in the county. The population density was 15 people per square mile (5.8 people/km^{2}). There were 5,879 housing units at an average density of 6 units per square mile (2.3/km^{2}). The racial makeup of the county was 88.09% White, 1.59% Black or African American, 3.02% Native American, 0.22% Asian, 0.01% Pacific Islander, 4.34% from other races, and 2.74% from two or more races. 6.90% of the population were Hispanic or Latino of any race.

In 2000, there were 5,247 households, out of which 35.40% had children under the age of 18 living with them, 62.20% were married couples living together, 8.00% had a female householder with no husband present, and 25.80% were non-families. 23.50% of all households were made up of individuals, and 12.00% had someone living alone who was 65 years of age or older. The average household size was 2.60 and the average family size was 3.08.

In the county, the population was spread out, with 27.20% under the age of 18, 8.20% from 18 to 24, 26.80% from 25 to 44, 22.40% from 45 to 64, and 15.40% who were 65 years of age or older. The median age was 38 years. For every 100 females there were 95.10 males. For every 100 females age 18 and over, there were 92.90 males.

The median income for a household in the county was $36,676, and the median income for a family was $43,242. Males had a median income of $30,918 versus $19,819 for females. The per capita income for the county was $18,167. About 8.50% of families and 10.80% of the population were below the poverty line, including 14.30% of those under age 18 and 6.50% of those age 65 or over.

== Communities ==
=== Cities and towns ===
- Cashion
- Dover
- Hennessey
- Kingfisher (county seat)
- Loyal
- Okarche

=== Unincorporated communities ===
- Alpha
- Four Counties Corner (formerly Lockridge)
- Lacey
- Omega

== Politics ==
At the presidential level, Kingfisher County has voted predominantly Republican; the last Democratic presidential nominee to carry the county was Franklin D. Roosevelt in 1936.

Voter Registration and Party Enrollment as of June 30, 2023
| Party | Number of Voters | Percentage |
|---|---|---|
| Democratic | 1,319 | 15.17% |
| Republican | 6,422 | 73.88% |
| Others | 951 | 10.94% |
| Total | 8,692 | 100% |

United States presidential election results for Kingfisher County, Oklahoma
| Year | Republican | | Democratic | | Third party(ies) | |
| Year | No. | % | No. | % | No. | % |
|---|---|---|---|---|---|---|
| 1908 | 2,106 | 54.26% | 1,540 | 39.68% | 235 | 6.06% |
| 1912 | 1,527 | 48.90% | 1,235 | 39.55% | 361 | 11.56% |
| 1916 | 1,728 | 48.90% | 1,364 | 38.60% | 442 | 12.51% |
| 1920 | 3,220 | 61.77% | 1,744 | 33.45% | 249 | 4.78% |
| 1924 | 2,834 | 55.62% | 1,644 | 32.27% | 617 | 12.11% |
| 1928 | 4,063 | 69.08% | 1,780 | 30.26% | 39 | 0.66% |
| 1932 | 2,103 | 34.54% | 3,986 | 65.46% | 0 | 0.00% |
| 1936 | 2,539 | 38.17% | 4,081 | 61.35% | 32 | 0.48% |
| 1940 | 3,718 | 56.27% | 2,865 | 43.36% | 25 | 0.38% |
| 1944 | 3,417 | 60.92% | 2,175 | 38.78% | 17 | 0.30% |
| 1948 | 2,931 | 54.09% | 2,488 | 45.91% | 0 | 0.00% |
| 1952 | 4,873 | 76.96% | 1,459 | 23.04% | 0 | 0.00% |
| 1956 | 3,935 | 70.23% | 1,668 | 29.77% | 0 | 0.00% |
| 1960 | 3,501 | 65.78% | 1,821 | 34.22% | 0 | 0.00% |
| 1964 | 3,117 | 55.37% | 2,512 | 44.63% | 0 | 0.00% |
| 1968 | 3,558 | 64.64% | 1,226 | 22.27% | 720 | 13.08% |
| 1972 | 4,861 | 81.90% | 912 | 15.37% | 162 | 2.73% |
| 1976 | 3,443 | 58.39% | 2,372 | 40.22% | 82 | 1.39% |
| 1980 | 4,962 | 77.31% | 1,282 | 19.98% | 174 | 2.71% |
| 1984 | 5,528 | 82.68% | 1,125 | 16.83% | 33 | 0.49% |
| 1988 | 4,011 | 68.54% | 1,777 | 30.37% | 64 | 1.09% |
| 1992 | 3,479 | 54.27% | 1,379 | 21.51% | 1,553 | 24.22% |
| 1996 | 3,423 | 60.27% | 1,626 | 28.63% | 630 | 11.09% |
| 2000 | 4,693 | 77.49% | 1,304 | 21.53% | 59 | 0.97% |
| 2004 | 5,630 | 84.64% | 1,022 | 15.36% | 0 | 0.00% |
| 2008 | 5,372 | 84.19% | 1,009 | 15.81% | 0 | 0.00% |
| 2012 | 4,870 | 84.43% | 898 | 15.57% | 0 | 0.00% |
| 2016 | 5,156 | 84.10% | 786 | 12.82% | 189 | 3.08% |
| 2020 | 5,521 | 85.40% | 854 | 13.21% | 90 | 1.39% |
| 2024 | 5,745 | 85.06% | 923 | 13.67% | 86 | 1.27% |

== Economy ==
Agriculture has been the mainstay of the county since the area was opened for settlement in 1899. Wheat and rye have been the most important crops. Oil and gas exploration became important to the county economy during the 1920s, especially in that part of the county around Hennessey, Cashion and Dover. Roxana was a boomtown during that period, but quickly declined its population peaked at one thousand people. It is now considered a ghost town.

== Education ==
Kingfisher Academy, affiliated with the Congregational Church, was established in Kingfisher well before statehood. It remained open between 1890 and 1894. In 1895, the Association of Congregational Churches of Oklahoma Territory chartered Kingfisher College, and opened it for instruction on September 2, 1895.

== NRHP sites ==
The following sites in Kingfisher County are listed on the National Register of Historic Places:

- Burrus Mills Elevator C, Kingfisher
- Dow Grain Company Elevator, Okarche
- Farmers and Merchants National Bank, Hennessey
- Farmers Co-op Elevator, Hennessey
- Kiel-Dover Farmers Elevator, Dover
- Kingfisher Armory, Kingfisher
- Kingfisher College, Kingfisher
- Kingfisher Post Office, Kingfisher
- Seay Mansion, Kingfisher
