= Robert Martin (Oklahoma politician) =

Acting Governor of Oklahoma Territory

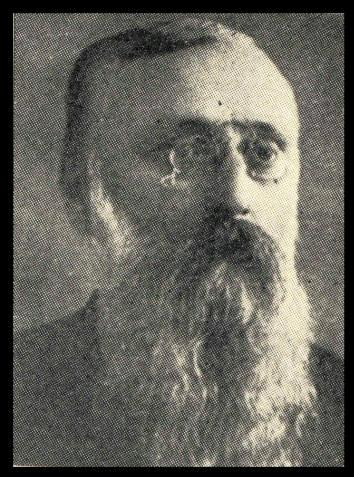
- Born: 1833; Beaver County, Pennsylvania, US
- Died: March 2, 1897 (aged 63–64); Guthrie, Oklahoma, US
- Occupations: Attorney, politician
- Known for: Secretary and Acting Governor of Oklahoma Territory

Robert Martin (1833–1897), a Republican lawyer and native of Pennsylvania who moved to Oklahoma Territory in 1889 and served as Secretary (1890–1893) and acting governor of Oklahoma Territory (1891 to 1892).

== Biography ==
Robert Martin was born in Frankfort Springs, Pennsylvania. He graduated from Westminster College in New Wilmington, Pennsylvania. While reading law, he taught high school in Steubenville, Ohio. In 1861, he married Ada Gilmore of Marietta, Ohio. The couple had two daughters. In 1862, he began a law practice in Steubenville. Later that year, he enlisted in the 126th Ohio Volunteer Infantry as an officer. Because of illness, Martin was discharged from the U.S. Army in November 1863. He returned to his law practice and became involved in Republican party politics.

Moving from Wichita, Kansas, he settled in Harrison, Oklahoma Territory, in 1889. He worked for the adoption of the Organic Act, and was part of the convention of July, 1899 that created Oklahoma Territory. He then moved to El Reno. When the territorial government was established, he was named as its secretary.

== Oklahoma politics ==
After a move to El Reno, Martin was appointed Secretary of Oklahoma Territory in 1890. at the same time US President Benjamin Harrison appointed George Washington Steele as Oklahoma Territory's first Governor. Serving as Governor Steele's second-in-command of the Territory, Martin assumed the governorship when Steele resigned on October 18, 1891. Martin would serve as acting governor until President Harrison appointed Abraham Jefferson Seay on February 1, 1892. Then Martin returned to his position as secretary, where he continued to serve until Grover Cleveland was elected president. Cleveland replaced the Seay administration with a Democratic regime in May, 1893. He moved to Guthrie where he was elected Mayor, serving until 1896. His chief accomplishment was retiring the city's debt and putting its financial house in order.

== Death ==
Martin died of a heart attack on March 2, 1897, in Guthrie and is buried in Summit View Cemetery, Guthrie, Logan County, Oklahoma.
