= Guthrie and Western Railway =

Overview
- Locale: Oklahoma
- Dates of operation: 1900–1902

Technical
- Track gauge: 4 ft 8 1/2 in (1,435 mm)
- Length: 10.6 mi (17.1 km)

The genesis of the Guthrie and Western Railway (G&WR) may be said to have occurred January 9, 1900, at a public meeting in the city of Guthrie, Oklahoma. At least one recollection of the evening involved the crowd being told that, while the town was already served by the Atchison, Topeka and Santa Fe Railway ("AT&SF"), it was not served by the Chicago, Rock Island and Pacific Railroad ("Rock Island"); and, if the town could raise $15,000, the Rock Island would-- perhaps under another name-- build a line from a connection with its track near Kingfisher into the city of Guthrie. What actually happened was that funding was raised for the G&WR, an affiliate of the AT&SF. Incorporated in Oklahoma Territory on that same date, the railroad during 1900 built from a point on the main line of the AT&SF between the stations of Seward and Guthrie, to Cashion, Oklahoma, 10.6 miles, where it met the rails of the Guthrie and Kingfisher Railway, which in turn connected to the tracks of the Rock Island at Kingfisher.

The line was operated by the AT&SF from its first day. A wholly owned subsidiary of the AT&SF, the railroad was sold June 16, 1902 to another AT&SF affiliate, the Eastern Oklahoma Railway. In subsequent history, the Eastern Oklahoma Railway was sold to the AT&SF on June 20, 1907. The line was abandoned in 1934.
