= Chisholm Trail Historical Museum =

Coordinates: 34.5154°N 97.9834°W

The Chisholm Trail Historical Museum was a museum in Waurika, Oklahoma which celebrated the historic Chisholm Trail. It covered the history of the Chisholm Trail and the people associated with it. Operation of the museum at one point was given to the Oklahoma Historical Society. The museum has since closed.

There are other museums dedicated to the Chisholm Trail, such as the Chisholm Trail Museum in Kingfisher, Oklahoma, the Chisholm Trail Heritage Center in Duncan, Oklahoma, the Chisholm Trail Museum in Wellington, Kansas, the Chisholm Trail Outdoor Museum in Cleburne, Texas and the Chisholm Trail Heritage Museum in Cuero, Texas.
