= Guthrie and Kingfisher Railway =

Overview
- Locale: Oklahoma
- Dates of operation: 1900–1937

Technical
- Track gauge: 4 ft 8 1/2 in (1,435 mm)
- Length: 16.0 mi (25.7 km)

The Guthrie and Kingfisher Railway (G&KR) was a shortline railroad connecting Kingfisher, Oklahoma and what became Cashion, Oklahoma, a distance of sixteen miles. The trackage was built in 1900, and was both abandoned & removed in 1937.

== History ==
The G&KR was incorporated December 29, 1899 under the laws of the Oklahoma Territory by inveterate railroad builder Warren Purdy, who wanted to construct a line to carry western Oklahoma agricultural products eastward from a connection with the Chicago, Rock Island and Pacific Railroad (Rock Island) at Kingfisher toward Guthrie, Oklahoma. Guthrie was the Oklahoma territorial capitol, and had a connection to the Atchison, Topeka and Santa Fe Railway (Santa Fe). However, a Santa Fe affiliate, the Guthrie and Western Railway, started building tracks west from a connection with the Santa Fe line at Seward, Oklahoma, just southwest of Guthrie. The railroads agreed to meet and connect at a point about one-half mile south of Downs, Oklahoma. With funding from the Rock Island, the G&KR built sixteen miles of track to the meeting point in 1900, the first train arriving on May 29, 1900. The site was on land owned by the Guthrie & Kingfisher Improvement Company, which sold lots, with the area becoming the town of Cashion. The G&KR obtained overhead trackage rights from both the Guthrie and Western and the Santa Fe into the city of Guthrie, thus completing the G&KR's purpose.

While the railroads created Cashion, they destroyed the town of Downs. Supplies to Downs were traditionally moved by wagon. When the railroads met at Cashion, all of the merchants in Downs, wanting to be on the rail line, relocated to Cashion along with most of the residences, leaving Downs as agricultural land.

The G&KR was conveyed to the Rock Island on October 8, 1900. The line was still in operation in 1934, but at that point the Santa Fe abandoned its stretch between Cashion and Seward. The G&KR, by then connecting nothing but Kingfisher and Cashion, abandoned its line on April 1, 1937, with the tracks being removed by June 4, 1937.
