= Chisholm Trail Museum (Wellington, Kansas) =

Coordinates: 37°16′12″N 97°23′55″W

The Chisholm Trail Museum in Wellington, Kansas is a museum that celebrates the Chisholm Trail. The Museum was formed in 1963 by a group of Wellington citizens. In 1965, the Hatcher Hospital Building was donated to the museum.

It includes artifacts of local domestic life.

There are other museums dedicated to the Chisholm Trail in Kingfisher, Oklahoma (The Chisholm), in Duncan, Oklahoma (the Chisholm Trail Heritage Center), the Chisholm Trail Outdoor Museum in Cleburne, Texas, and the Chisholm Trail Heritage Museum in Cuero, Texas. The museum in Waurika, Oklahoma (the Chisholm Trail Historical Museum) is now closed.
