= George Washington Steele =

American politician

George W. Steele
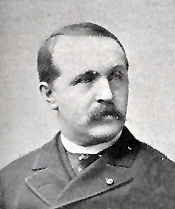

Member of the U.S. House of Representatives from Indiana's 11th district
- In office March 4, 1881 – March 3, 1889
- Preceded by: Calvin Cowgill
- Succeeded by: Augustus N. Martin
- In office March 4, 1895 – March 3, 1903
- Preceded by: Augustus N. Martin
- Succeeded by: Frederick Landis

1st Governor of Oklahoma Territory
- In office May 22, 1890 – October 18, 1891
- Appointed by: Benjamin Harrison
- Preceded by: None
- Succeeded by: Robert Martin as Acting Territorial Governor (Note: Robert Martin served as Acting Governor until President Harrison appointed Abraham Jefferson Seay to the Governorship)

Personal details
- Born: George Washington Steele; December 13, 1839 Fayette County, Indiana, U.S.
- Died: July 12, 1922 (aged 82) Marion, Indiana, U.S.
- Resting place: Odd Fellows Cemetery in Marion, IN
- Party: Republican
- Spouse: Marietta E. Swayzee
- Profession: Lawyer, Soldier, Statesman

George Washington Steele (December 13, 1839 – July 12, 1922) was an American lawyer, soldier, and politician who twice served as a representative for Indiana, from 1881 to 1889 and again from 1895 to 1903. Steele was also the first governor of Oklahoma Territory and was instrumental in developing the state's public education system and its two largest universities.

== Early life and the American Civil War ==
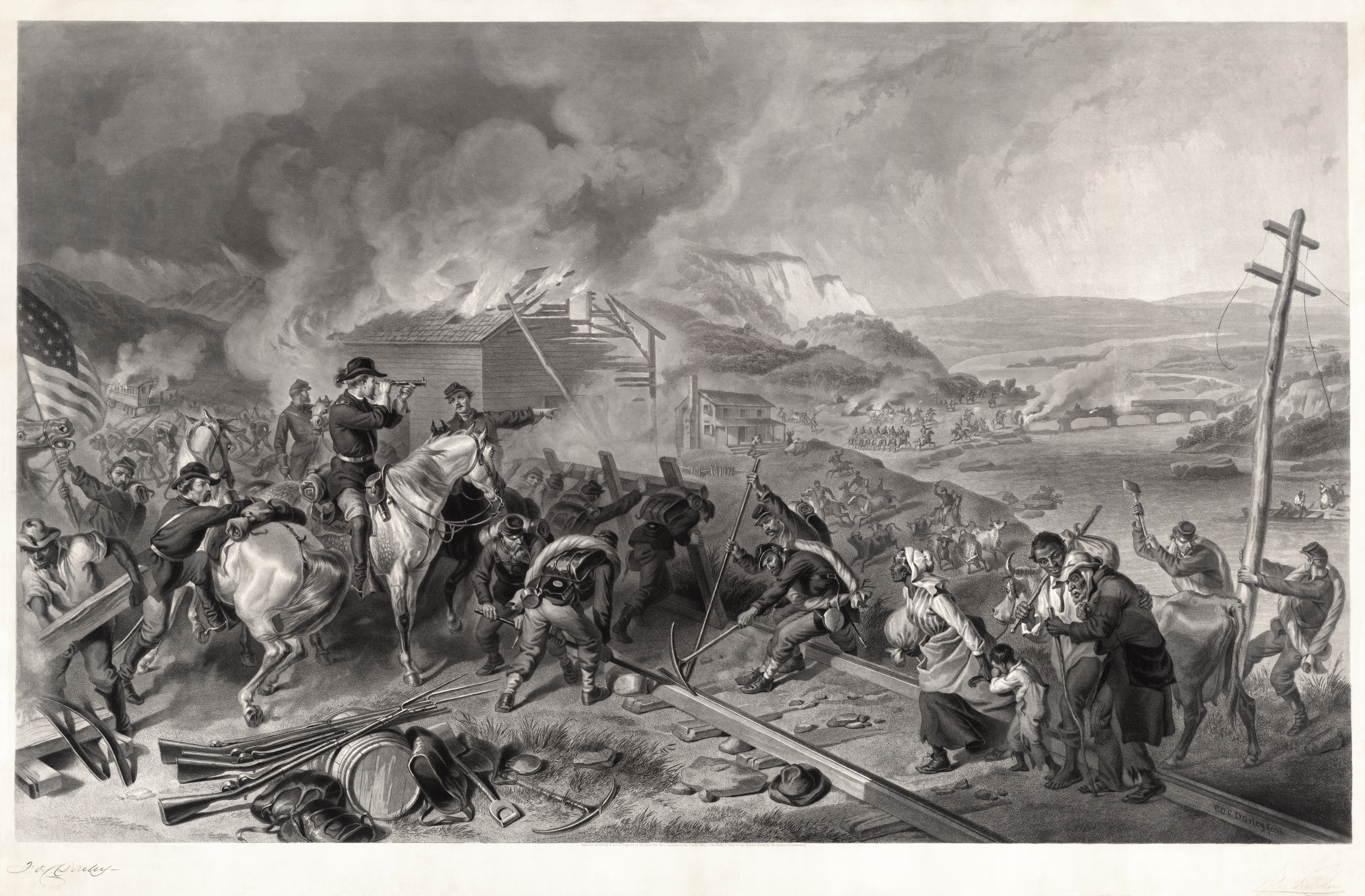
Steele served in Sherman's March to the Sea.

Steele was born to Asbury and Marie Louise Steele in Fayette County, Indiana, on December 13, 1839. He received an education from Indiana's public school system and then earned a law degree from Ohio Wesleyan University. Following the completion of his education, Steele passed the bar exam and set up a practice in Hartford City, Indiana.

Steele continued his law practice until 1861 with the outbreak of the American Civil War. Indiana stayed loyal to the Union, and Steele joined the 12th Indiana Regiment in the Union Army as a volunteer on May 2, 1861. He later transferred to the 101st Indiana Regiment, in which he served until the conclusion of the war. Steele served under Maj. Gen. William Tecumseh Sherman in his famous March to the Sea. Following the Carolinas campaign and the end of the war, Steele was promoted to the rank of lieutenant colonel in July 1865.

After the Civil War ended in the Union's favor and with the United States restored, Steele transferred from the volunteer army to the Regular Army. Steele was promoted to the rank of major and served in the 14th U.S. Infantry. His commission lasted for ten years, from February 23, 1866, to February 1876.

== Political career ==
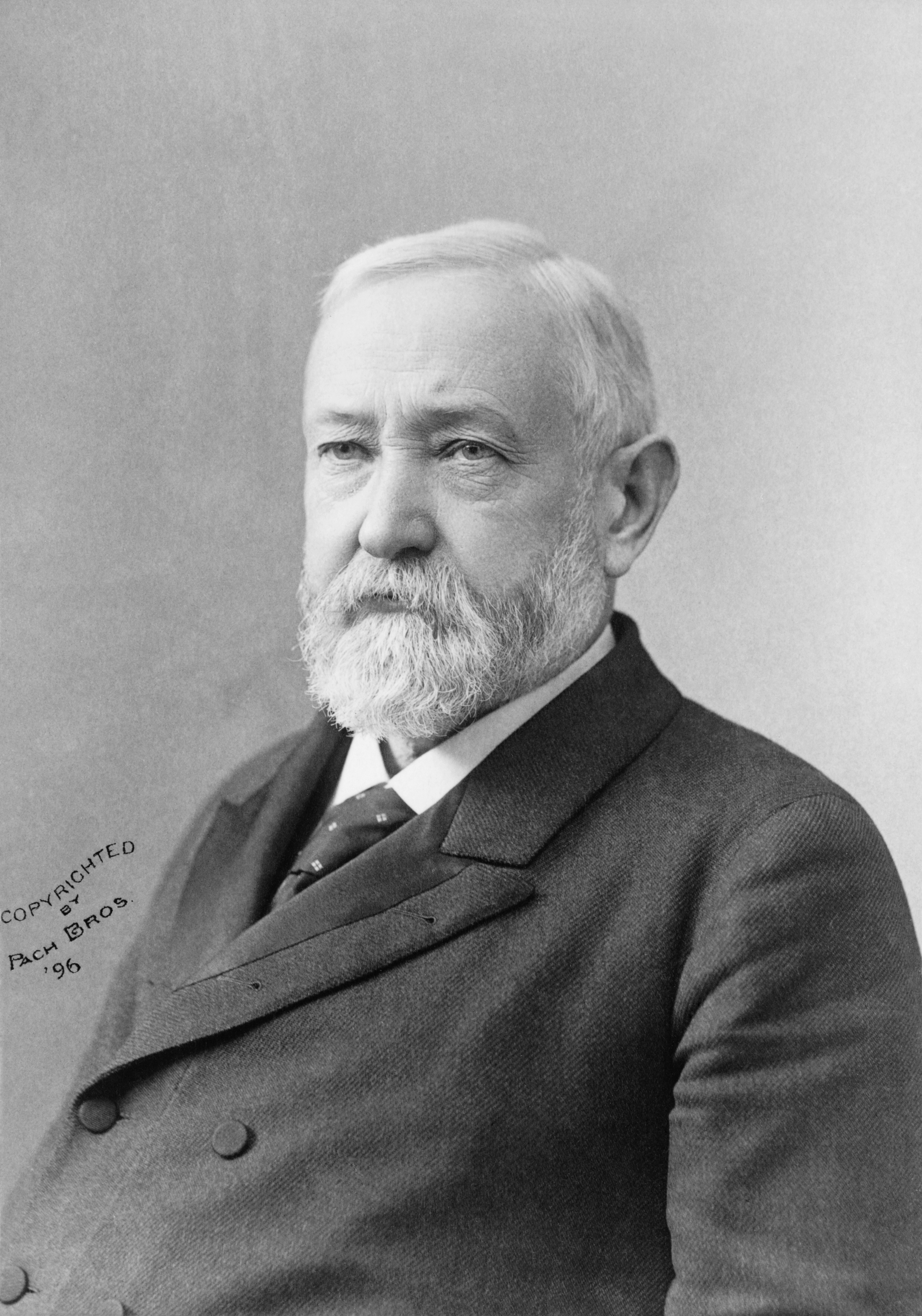
President Benjamin Harrison appointed Steele Governor of Oklahoma Territory.

Following his retirement from the army, Steele returned to Indiana, where he settled in Marion and established a business that engaged in agricultural pursuits and pork packing. Steele's loyalty to the Union led him to join the Republican Party. He became active in local politics and gained enough support to win the race to serve as a Congressman from Indiana's 11th District in 1880. Steele was inaugurated on March 4, 1883. He retained his post for eight years, winning reelection in 1882, 1884, and 1886.

After officially leaving office on March 3, 1889, Steele returned home to Marion. Within a year's time, on May 2, 1890, the western portion of the unorganized territory of modern-day Oklahoma became the Oklahoma Territory. Upon hearing reports of disorder and chaos in the new territory, President Benjamin Harrison wanted a former military officer to serve as the territory's first governor. Harrison appointed Steele to the office, and on May 22, 1890, Steele was inaugurated in Guthrie, Oklahoma Territory.

=== Governor of Oklahoma Territory ===
Immediately upon entering office, Governor Steele declared a state of emergency throughout the Territory. This allowed him to best use his experience as a military officer. Steele supplemented the orderly processes of government for the Territory's disorderly situation. Unfortunately for the Governor, much of his time was occupied with a dispute with the Oklahoma Territorial Legislature. The Legislature wanted to move the capital from Guthrie, first to Oklahoma City then to Kingfisher. All of these bills were vetoed by the Governor.

Steele also urged the creation of a public school system and universities of higher education in the Territory. Through his work, the Legislature approved and established two universities: one in Norman and another in Stillwater. The Norman Territorial University would become University of Oklahoma, with the Stillwater A&M College becoming Oklahoma State University.

After only seventeen months in office, Governor Steele resigned the governorship effective October 18, 1891. In his place, President Harrison appointed Abraham Jefferson Seay to the governorship. Robert Martin, Secretary of Oklahoma Territory, served as Acting Governor from October 18, 1891, until February 1892, when Governor Seay took the oath of office.

=== National Home for Disabled Volunteer Soldiers, Marion Branch ===
Returning to Marion, Steele remained a private citizen until he reentered state politics in 1894 when he was elected to once again represent Indiana's 11th District in the United States House of Representatives. His term officially began on March 4, 1895.

While in the House, Steele served as the Chairman for the House Committee on Manufactures, during the 57th United States Congress. Steele remained in office as a Congressman until 1903, after serving eight years.

The existence of the Marion Branch was due, in great part to the leadership of George Steele Sr. of Marion, who represented the 11th Congressional District of Indiana from 1880 to 1890. During his last term, he introduced legislation to establish a branch home in Grant County in the fiftieth session of congress, the measure coming up in December, and for seven months he watched the proceedings. The bill was approved by an Act of Congress and signed by President Grover Cleveland on July 23, 1888, entitled: "An Act to authorize the location of a Branch Home for Disabled Volunteer Soldiers in Grant County, Indiana, and For Other Purposes".

Approval of Steele's bill was received with great enthusiasm in Marion, where the local newspaper predicted that the expenditure for the branch would total at least $500,000. News of the bills passing was favorably received in Grant County and on July 30, 1888, a celebration took place and it was estimated that the streets of Marion were thronged with the largest assemblage ever reported in Marion. In early 1890 Steele became the first President of the First National Bank in Marion. However, at the request of President Benjamin Harrison, he took the position of governor of the Oklahoma Territory from mid 1890 to late 1891. Upon his return to Marion in 1894, he was elected Congressional representative for four more terms. Steele also served on the Board of Managers of the National Military Home at Marion from April 21, 1890, to December 10, 1904. On December 11, 1904, Steele became the third director of the Marion Branch, moving to the Director's House on the grounds and serving until his retirement on May 31, 1915.

== Death and legacy ==
Steele once again returned to life as private citizen in Marion. At the age of 83, Steele died on July 12, 1922, in Marion. He is buried there in Odd Fellows Cemetery.

Steele's most enduring legacy would not be found in his home state of Indiana or in national politics, but in Oklahoma. He instituted Oklahoma Territory's first public school system, as well as to help establish Oklahoma's premier universities: University of Oklahoma and Oklahoma State University. One observer noted his tenure as Governor: "He was a most capable executive and his unafraid service to the territory must not be minimized."

== See also ==
National Home for Disabled Volunteer Soldiers, Marion Branch

U.S. House of Representatives
Preceded by Calvin Cowgill	Member of the U.S. House of Representatives from Indiana's 11th congressional district 1881–1889	Succeeded by Augustus N. Martin
Preceded by Augustus N. Martin	Member of the U.S. House of Representatives from Indiana's 11th congressional district 1895–1903	Succeeded by Frederick Landis
