= Chisholm Trail Outdoor Museum (Cleburne, Texas) =

Outdoor Museum in Cleburne, Texas

The Chisholm Trail Outdoor Museum
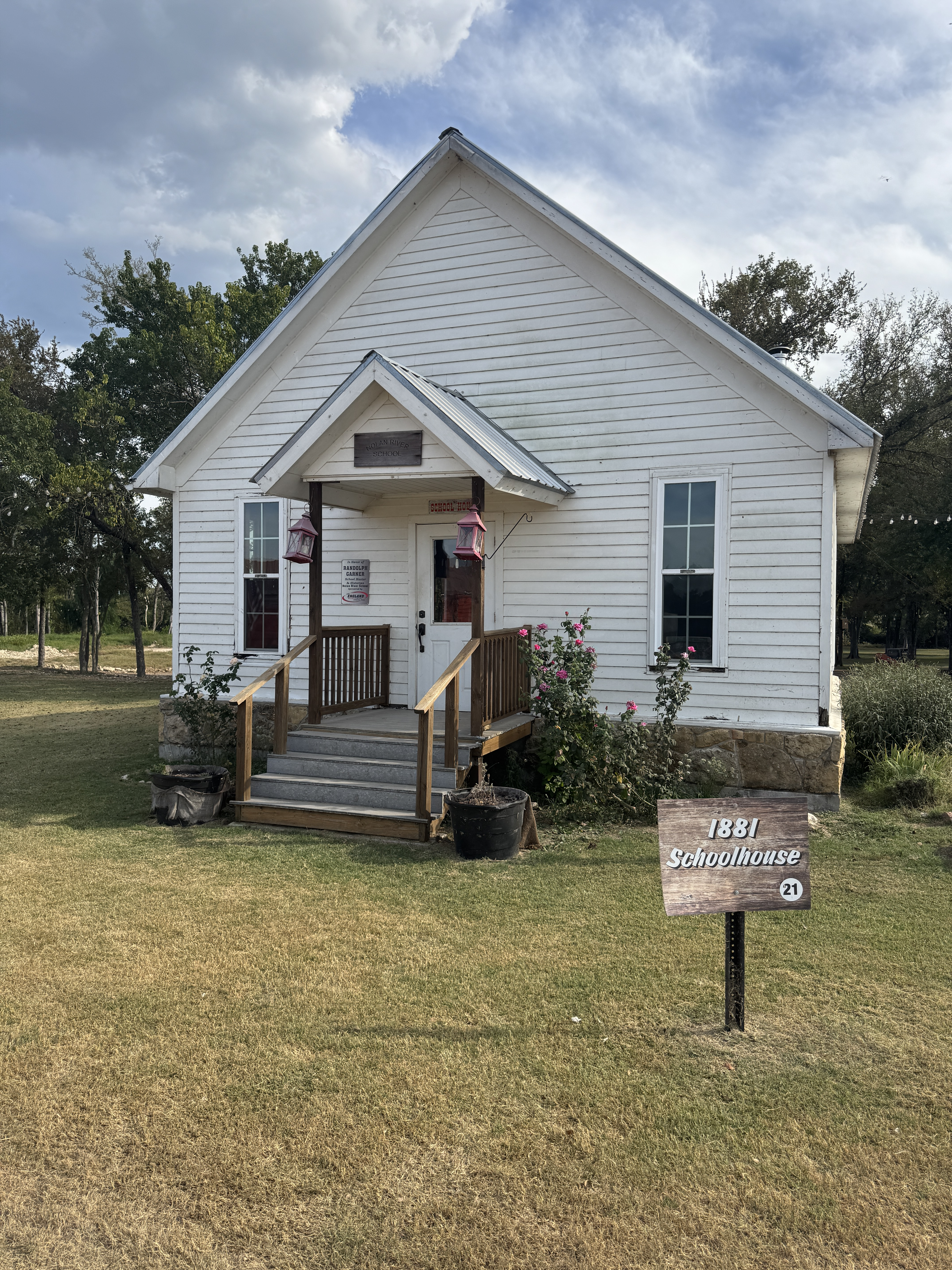
- The 1881 School House at the museum

- Location within Texas Location within the United States
- Location: Cleburne; Johnson County; Texas
- Coordinates: 32.323003°N 97.449156°W
- Website: www.thechisholmtrailoutdoormuseum.com

The Chisholm Trail Outdoor Museum in Cleburne, Texas is an outdoor museum that celebrates the Chisholm Trail.

The museum features a number of original, and recreated buildings, including the oldest surviving log Courthouse in Texas, from 1855. The museum also features a Western Memorabilia Museum, featuring items belonging to former Fort Worth city manager Douglas Harman.

Other attractions include a working blacksmith shop, a restored 19th-century stagecoach, a Texas Rangers and Civil War Museum, and a petting zoo.

== Big Bear Native American Museum ==
The Big Bear Native American Museum is located on the site, displaying the collection of Leonard "Big Bear" Beal, with items related to his own life traveling and working throughout he united states, including a short stint as a professional wrestler under the ring names Cowboy Beal and Tex Beal.

The collection features a number of artifacts, weapons and tools, as well as a number of local crafts and photographs related to the Native Americans in the region.

== Other Chisholm Trail museums ==
There are other museums dedicated to the Chisholm Trail in Kingfisher, Oklahoma (The Chisholm), in Wellington, Kansas (the Chisolm Trail Museum), in Duncan, Oklahoma (the Chisholm Trail Heritage Center), and the Chisholm Trail Heritage Museum in Cuero, Texas. The museum in Waurika, Oklahoma (the Chisholm Trail Historical Museum) is now closed.
