= Augustus N. Martin =

American politician

Augustus Newton Martin
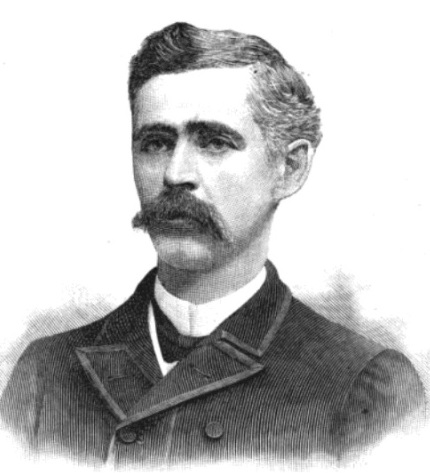
- From 1892's The History of the Democratic Party from Thomas Jefferson to Grover Cleveland

Member of the U.S. House of Representatives from Indiana's 11th district
- In office March 4, 1889 – March 3, 1895
- Preceded by: George Washington Steele
- Succeeded by: George Washington Steele

Personal details
- Born: March 23, 1847 Whitestown, Connoquenessing Township, Pennsylvania, U.S.
- Died: July 11, 1901 (aged 54) Soldiers' Home Hospital, Marion, Indiana, U.S.
- Resting place: Fairview Cemetery, Bluffton, Indiana, U.S.
- Party: Democratic

Augustus Newton Martin (March 23, 1847 – July 11, 1901) was an American lawyer, educator, and veteran of the Civil War who served three terms as a U.S. representative from Indiana from 1889 to 1895.

== Biography ==
Born near Whitestown, Connoquenessing Township, Pennsylvania, Martin attended the common schools and Witherspoon Institute, Butler, Pennsylvania, and graduated in February 1867 from Eastman Business College in Poughkeepsie, New York.

=== Civil War ===
On July 3, 1863, he enlisted in Company I, Fifty-eighth Regiment, Pennsylvania Volunteer Militia. He enlisted again, on February 22, 1865, in Company E, Seventy-eighth Regiment, Pennsylvania Volunteer Infantry, and served until discharged for disability August 30, 1865.

=== Career after the war ===
After his service in the Civil War, Martin taught school. He studied law in Bluffton, Indiana, in 1869. He was admitted to the bar in 1870 and practiced. He served as a member of the Indiana House of Representatives in 1875.

=== Political career ===
Martin was elected reporter of the Indiana Supreme Court in 1876 and served four years. He was an unsuccessful candidate for reelection in 1880. He lived in Austin, Texas from 1881 to 1883, and returned to Bluffton in 1883.

Martin was elected as a Democrat to the Fifty-first, Fifty-second, and Fifty-third Congresses (March 4, 1889 – March 3, 1895).

He served as chairman of the Committee on Invalid Pensions (Fifty-second and Fifty-third Congresses). He was an unsuccessful candidate for reelection to the Fifty-fourth Congress.

=== Later career and death ===
He engaged in the practice of law in Bluffton until his death at the Soldiers' Home Hospital, Marion, Indiana on July 11, 1901. He was interred in Fairview Cemetery in Bluffton.

U.S. House of Representatives
Preceded by George W. Steele	Member of the U.S. House of Representatives from Indiana's 11th congressional district 1889–1895	Succeeded by George W. Steele
