= Adam Binder series =

Series of urban fantasy novels by David R. Slayton

- White Trash Warlock (2010); Trailer Park Trickster (2021); Deadbeat Druid (2022); Rogue Community College (2024); Redneck Revenant (2025); Backwoods Banshee (2026)
- Author: David R. Slayton
- Country: United States
- Language: English
- Publisher: Blackstone Publishing
- Published: October 13, 2020 – present
- No. of books: 6

The Adam Binder novels are a series of urban fantasy novels by David R. Slayton. The main series consists of five novels, White Trash Warlock (2020), Trailer Park Trickster (2021), Deadbeat Druid (2022), Redneck Revenant (2025), and Backwoods Banshee (2026). The novels received critical praise for their depiction of poverty, LGBT issues, and family relationships in the setting of urban fantasy novels. A spin-off novel set between books three and four, Rogue Community College, was published in October 2024.

== Plot ==
=== White Trash Warlock ===
Adam Binder, a young gay boy living in Guthrie, Oklahoma, lives in poverty with his parents and older brother Robert. His father disappears when Adam is young. As a teenager, Adam begins to hear voices and visit the spirit world. Unwilling to accept the existence of magic, his mother and brother have him institutionalized. In the institution, Liberty House, Adam spirit walks and meets an elf named Perak, who teaches him to control his power. Adam falls in love with Perak, who eventually abandons him. Adam leaves Liberty House on his 18th birthday. He moves in with his grandaunt Sue, also a witch.

Adam investigates dark artifacts made from the bones of magical creatures. These artifacts were created by a warlock, or a witch who has turned to dark magic. He suspects that the warlock is his missing father and learns that one artifact was first found in Denver. Adam receives a call from his estranged brother, now a physician living in Denver, Colorado. Robert's wife Annie has been possessed by an evil spirit, and he begs Adam for help. Adam visits Denver, finding that all of the local witches have been killed by the same spirit that is possessing Annie. While investigating, the spirit takes control of a police officer and tries to kill Adam. An officer named Vic is shot, and Adam saves Vic's life through magic.

Adam beseeches the elves for help. Elves are immensely powerful immortals, but they cannot fight the spirit because it consumes magic. Adam meets the prince and princess of the elves, Silver and Argent, and learns that Perak was an alias for Silver. Vic and Adam begin a romantic relationship. Eventually, Adam discovers a magical tool used to bind the spirit, which has recently been broken.

He learns that Death has orchestrated the release of the spirit as well as Annie's possession. Death is angry that the spirit has evaded her for so long, but the spirit can be killed while it possesses someone. She turns Vic into a Reaper, one of her servants, as a consequence of Adam's intervention in his death. Adam uses dark magic to bind the spirit to Annie's body and then kills her, becoming a warlock in the process. Robert tells Adam that their father is dead; Robert killed him after he saw their father beating Adam as a child. Adam realizes that the other warlock cannot be his father, and vows to discover the warlock's true identity. As the novel ends, Adam is visited by Sue's familiar, heralding that something terrible has happened to her.

== Background ==
Author David Slayton drew on his own experiences while creating the novel. Like Adam, Slayton is originally from Guthrie, Oklahoma, is gay, and is a high school dropout. Later, Slayton received a degree in history from Metropolitan State University of Denver, which allowed him to incorporate his favorite local aspects into the book's setting. Slayton's father was a police officer. Slayton interviewed police officers and researched the Denver police force while creating the character of Vic.

White Trash Warlock, the first book of the series, was released on 13 October 2020. Trailer Park Trickster followed in 2021, Deadbeat Druid on 18 October 2022, and Redneck Revenant on 28 October 2025.

== Reception ==
Kirkus Reviews gave White Trash Warlock a positive review, calling it "stylish urban fantasy with fully realized characters". Publishers Weekly gave the novel a starred review, praising the worldbuilding and depictions of poverty. The review also praised the romance between Adam and Vic, stating that it balanced out the tense tone of the main plot. A review in Portland Book Review called the novel a "must-have book" and praised the complex family dynamics at the heart of the story.

Publishers Weekly wrote a positive review for Trailer Park Trickster, calling it an "emotionally rich page-turner" and praising the interweaving narratives of Adam and Vic.

White Trash Warlock was nominated for the 2021 Colorado Book Award for science fiction or fantasy.
