= Omega, Oklahoma =

- Unincorporated community
- Location within Oklahoma and the United States Omega (the United States)
- Coordinates: 35°52′13″N 98°11′52″W
- Country: United States
- State: Oklahoma
- County: Kingfisher
- Elevation: 1,198 ft (365 m)
- Time zone: UTC-6 (Central (CST))
  - Summer (DST): UTC-5 (CDT)
- GNIS feature ID: 1096269

Omega is an unincorporated community in Kingfisher County, Oklahoma, United States. Omega is 5.5 miles (8.9 km) west of Alpha. The ZIP Code is 73764.

== Education ==
Chisholm Trail Technology Center is located in Omega.
