= Chisholm Trail Heritage Center =

Museum in Duncan, Oklahoma

Coordinates: 34.5154°N 97.9834°W

The Chisholm Trail Heritage Center is a museum in Duncan, Oklahoma, which celebrates the historic Chisolm Trail. Among other exhibits, it features the Paul Moore bronze “On the Chisholm Trail,” which stands nearly 15-feet high atop its immense base and stretches almost 35-feet across the horizon. Separate from the museum, Trail Ruts at Monument Hill just outside of Duncan has visible traces of cattle hoofs and wagons actually left on the trail.

There are other museums dedicated to the Chisholm Trail in Kingfisher, Oklahoma (The Chisholm), in Wellington, Kansas (the Chisolm Trail Museum), the Chisholm Trail Outdoor Museum in Cleburne, Texas, and the Chisholm Trail Heritage Museum in Cuero, Texas. The museum in Waurika, Oklahoma (the Chisholm Trail Historical Museum) is now closed.
