= Kingfisher Post Office =

- U.S. National Register of Historic Places
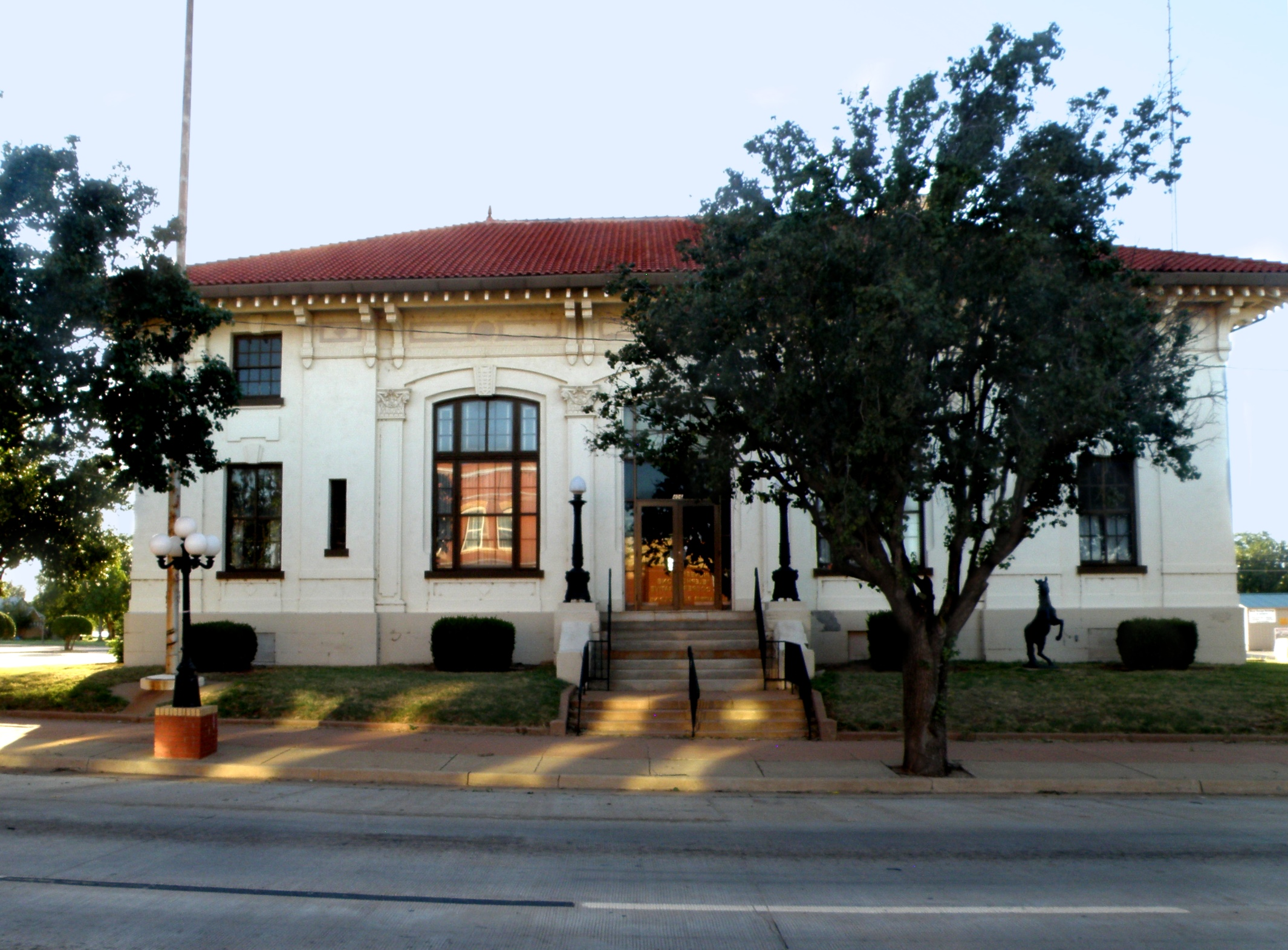

- Location within Oklahoma Location within the United States
- Location: 406 N. Main St., Kingfisher, Oklahoma
- Coordinates: 35°51′51″N 97°55′58″W
- Area: less than one acre
- Built: 1912–13
- Built by: Dieter & Wenzil Co.
- NRHP reference No.: 78002239
- Added to NRHP: January 20, 1978

The Kingfisher Post Office, also known as The Old Post Office, is the historic former post office in Kingfisher, Oklahoma. The post office was built by the Dieter & Wenzil Co. of St. Louis, Missouri; work on the building began on October 1, 1912, and finished on September 1, 1913. The stucco building has a red-tile hipped roof and cornices on each side. The post office operated until a larger post office opened in 1976.

The post office was listed on the National Register of Historic Places in 1978.
