= Governor Seay Mansion =

- Seay Mansion
- U.S. National Register of Historic Places
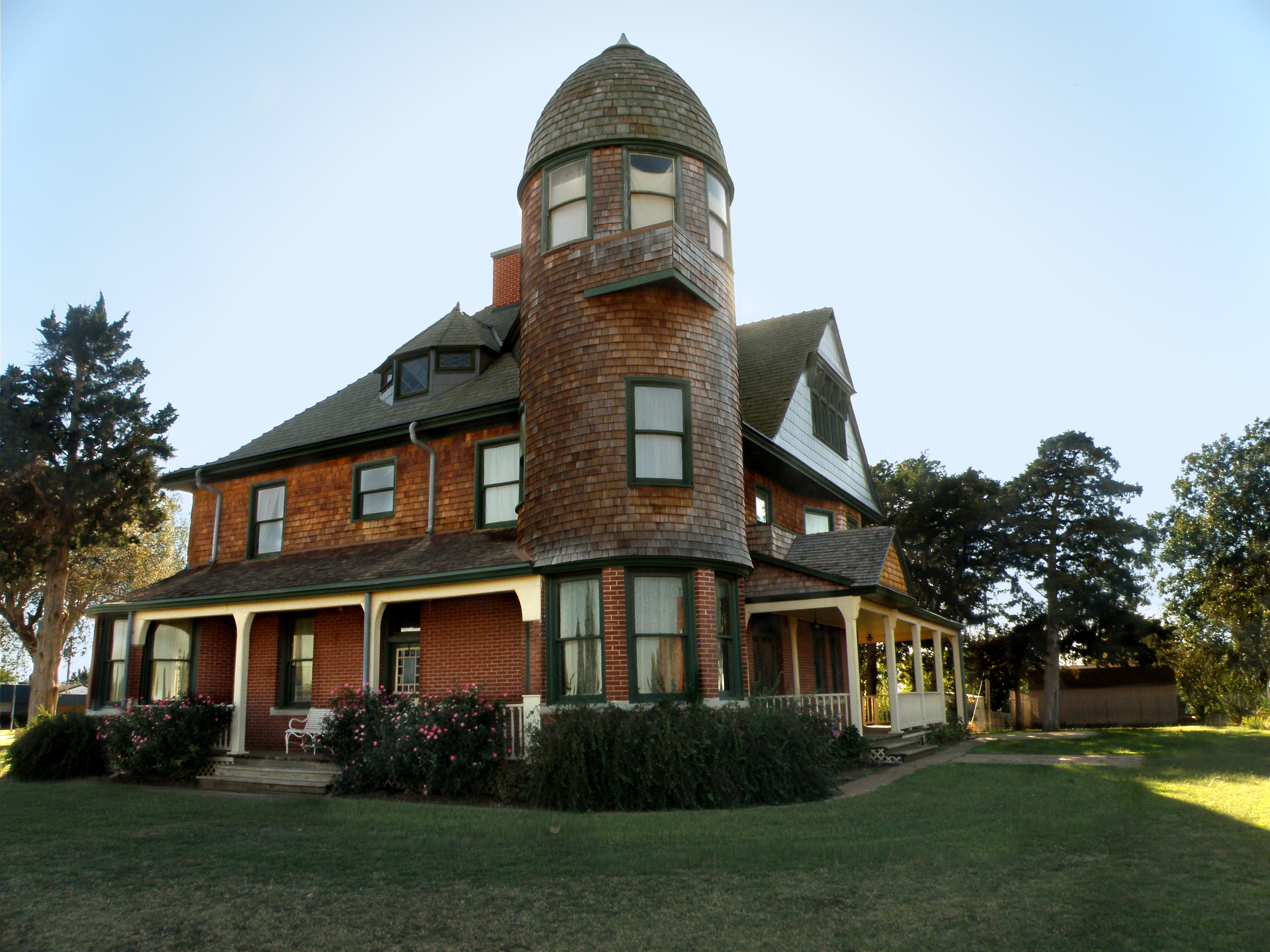

- Location within Oklahoma
- Location: 11th St. and Zellers Ave., Kingfisher, Oklahoma
- Coordinates: 35°50′56″N 97°56′21″W
- Area: 0.5 acres (0.20 ha)
- Built: 1892
- NRHP reference No.: 71000664
- Added to NRHP: March 24, 1971

The Governor Seay Mansion, at 11th St. and Zellers Ave. in Kingfisher, Oklahoma, was built in 1892. It was listed on the National Register of Historic Places in 1971 as Seay Mansion.

It is currently part of the Chisholm Trail Museum, which was established across the street before 1971. Admission to the museum includes entry to the Seay Mansion, which it calls Horizon Hill.

Built in 1892, it is a three-story red brick building which originally had a ballroom and a three-story tower, which were both removed in later renovations. A tower was added back later, however.

The building has some aspects of Queen Anne style, including the tower, some variety in exterior surface textures, and wraparound porches.

It was home of bachelor Abraham Jefferson Seay, the second governor of the Oklahoma Territory.
