= Alpha, Oklahoma =

- Unincorporated community
- Location within Oklahoma and the United States Alpha (the United States)
- Coordinates: 35°52′13″N 98°6′2″W
- Country: United States
- State: Oklahoma
- County: Kingfisher
- Elevation: 1,168 ft (356 m)
- Time zone: UTC-6 (Central (CST))
  - Summer (DST): UTC-5 (CDT)
- GNIS feature ID: 1100171

Alpha is an unincorporated community in Kingfisher County, Oklahoma, United States. Its altitude is 1165 feet (355 m). The post office was established November 7, 1893, and closed December 14, 1903. The Alpha site is 5.5 miles (8.9 km) east of Omega.

The Alpha school district closed in 1947. The Alpha Schoolhouse, the last structure in Alpha, was moved to the Frontier Country Historical Society Museum in Crescent in 2005.
