= 101st Indiana Infantry Regiment =

- Active: September 7, 1862 – June 24, 1865
- Disbanded: June 24, 1865
- Country: United States
- Allegiance: Union
- Branch: Infantry
- Size: Regiment
- Engagements: American Civil War: Defense of Cincinnati; Tullahoma Campaign (Battle of Hoover's Gap); Battle of Chickamauga; Battle of Missionary Ridge; Atlanta campaign; Battle of Rocky Face Ridge; Battle of Resaca; Battle of New Hope Church; Battle of Dallas; Battle of Marietta; Battle of Kennesaw Mountain; Battle of Atlanta; Battle of Jonesborough; Battle of Lovejoy's Station; Sherman's March to the Sea; Siege of Savannah; Carolinas campaign; Battle of Bentonville

Commanders
- Notable commanders: William Garver; Thomas Doan; George W. Steele

The 101st Regiment, Indiana Volunteer Infantry was an infantry regiment that served in the Union Army during the American Civil War. It fought in several major campaigns and battles in the Western Theater, including the Atlanta campaign and the Carolinas campaign. In 1862, the regiment was formed under the Army of the Ohio. From 1863 to 1865, attached to the Army of the Cumberland, XIV Army Corps.

== Overview ==
Organized at Wabash, Ind., and mustered in on September 7, 1862. Left State for Covington, Ky., September 7, and duty there till September 23. Moved to Louisville, Ky., September 23. Attached to 33rd Brigade, 10th Division, Army of the Ohio, September, 1862. 33rd Brigade, 10th Division, 1st Corps, Army of the Ohio, to November, 1862. 2nd Brigade, 5th Division (Centre), 14th Army Corps, Army of the Cumberland, to January, 1863. 2nd Brigade, 5th Division, 14th Army Corps, Army of the Cumberland, to June, 1863. 2nd Brigade, 4th Division, 14th Army Corps, to October, 1863. 2nd Brigade, 3rd Division, 14th Army Corps, to June, 1865. 1st Brigade, 3rd Division, 14th Army Corps, to June, 1865.

== Service ==
- Mustered in on September 7, 1862
- Defense of Cincinnati
- Tullahoma Campaign (Battle of Hoover's Gap)
- Battle of Chickamauga
- Battle of Missionary Ridge
- Atlanta campaign
- Battle of Rocky Face Ridge
- Battle of Resaca
- Battle of New Hope Church
- Battle of Dallas
- Battle of Marietta
- Battle of Kennesaw Mountain
- Battle of Atlanta
- Battle of Jonesborough
- Battle of Lovejoy's Station
- Sherman's March to the Sea
- Siege of Savannah - Savannah, Georgia
- Carolinas campaign
- Battle of Bentonville
- Grand Review of the Armies in Washington, D.C.
- Mustered out June 24, 1865

== See also ==
- List of Indiana Civil War regiments
