= Chisholm Trail Museum (Kingfisher, Oklahoma) =

The Chisholm Museum
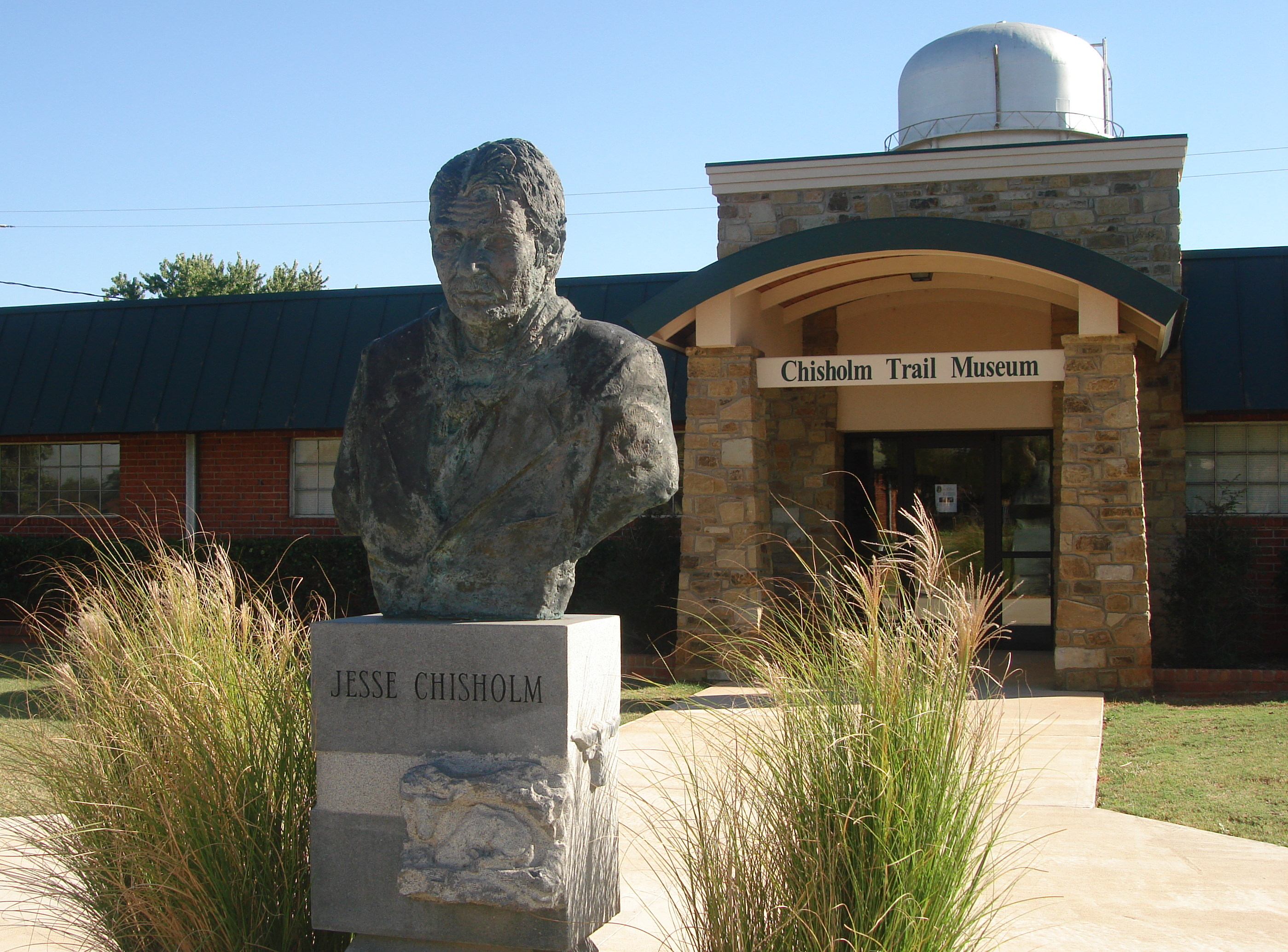

- Location within Oklahoma Location within the United States
- Location: Kingfisher; Kingfisher County; Oklahoma
- Coordinates: 35.848317°N 97.939452°W
- Website: www.thechisholm.org

The Chisholm Trail Museum in Kingfisher, Oklahoma, now known simply as The Chisholm, is a museum dedicated to collecting, preserving, and sharing the story of farming and ranching heritage across Oklahoma from its historical past through contemporary issues. At the museum site, there are six historic buildings: First Kingfisher Bank, Harmony Church, Gant Schoolhouse, the Cole Cabin, the Dalton Cabin, and the Governor Seay Mansion. Separate from the museum is a life-size statue of Jesse Chisholm, in the middle of downtown.

There are other museums dedicated to the Chisholm Trail in Duncan, Oklahoma (the Chisholm Trail Heritage Center), in Wellington, Kansas (the Chisolm Trail Museum), the Chisholm Trail Outdoor Museum in Cleburne, Texas, and the Chisholm Trail Heritage Museum in Cuero, Texas. The museum in Waurika, Oklahoma (the Chisholm Trail Historical Museum) is now closed.
