= Abraham Jefferson Seay =

American judge and politician

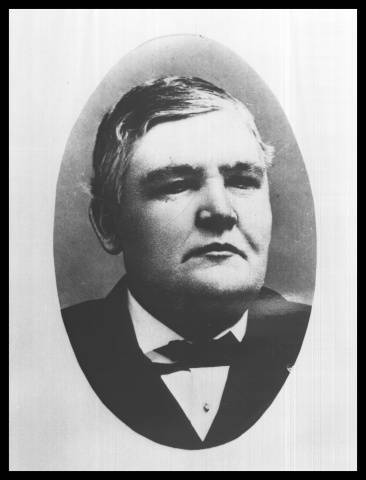

2nd Governor of Oklahoma Territory
- In office February 1, 1892 – May 7, 1893
- Appointed by: Benjamin Harrison
- Preceded by: Robert Martin as Acting Territorial Governor
- Succeeded by: William Cary Renfrow

Personal details
- Born: November 28, 1832 Amherst County, Virginia
- Died: December 12, 1915 Long Beach, California
- Party: Republican
- Spouse: Never married
- Profession: Soldier, lawyer, judge, banker

Abraham Jefferson Seay (November 28, 1832 – December 12, 1915) was an American lawyer, soldier, judge, and politician. Seay attained the rank of colonel in the Union army during the American Civil War. Later, Seay would serve as an associate justice on Oklahoma Territory's supreme court and as the second governor of the Oklahoma Territory.

== Early life and Civil War ==
Abraham Jefferson Seay was born to Cam and Lucy J. Seay at Amherst Court House, Amherst County, Virginia on November 28, 1832. Seay's family descended from English ancestry, with Seay able to trace his family to settlers who came to North America during the landing at Jamestown, Virginia, in 1642. At the age of three, Seay's father moved his family to Osage County, Missouri, where Seay's father started a farm and experimented in agriculture. During the winter of 1853 to 1854, Seay, at the age of 21, began working on the construction of Missouri Pacific Railroad. Seay used the money he earned from the railroad towards gaining an education.

In the spring of 1855, Seay enrolled at the Steelville Academy. His time at the academy was cut short when his father's death forced him to return home and assist his mother in caring for the farm and raising his ten other brothers and sisters. Despite this, Seay's time was alternated between teaching a public school and working on the farm. During his brief time at Steelville, Seay found an interest in law. He would spend years reading law materials at irregular intervals until, in August 1860, Seay moved to Cherryville, Missouri, where he entered a law office. Within months of the move, Seay, in April 1861 at the age of 29, was admitted to the Missouri bar association.

The same month Seay passed the bar exam, fighting began in the American Civil War. Immediately, Seay enlisted as a volunteer in the Union army. As a second lieutenant, Seay assisted in the enlistment of 200 men who become part of the 32nd Missouri Volunteer Infantry commanded by Colonel Francis Harwood Manter. Seay's work during the Civil War earned him several promotions. Seay was promoted successively to captain, major, and lieutenant colonel. Seay would serve the Union army well, fighting in the Battle of Elkhorn Tavern, Battle of Vicksburg, Battle of Jackson, Battle of Chattanooga, Battle of Lookout Mountain, Battle of Missionary Ridge, Battle of Atlanta, Battle of Savannah, the Capture of Columbia, and the Battle of Bentonville. Seay's last service came at Raleigh, North Carolina, while general Joseph E. Johnston surrendered. At the conclusion of the war, Seay left the army at the rank of colonel of his regiment.

== After the Civil War ==
Upon his return from the war, Seay was appointed by Governor Willard Preble Hall, county attorney of Crawford County. Later, Seay was advanced to circuit attorney before his retirement in 1870. After leaving government, Seay entered private practice until 1875. During that year, Seay was elected circuit judge of the 9th Missouri District. Following the end of his first six-year term, Seay would win reelection to a second six-year term.

Judge Seay declined a third term, preferring to resume his private practice. While in private practice, Seay entered into the realm of banking. Seay personally organized a bank at Union, Missouri, which he became president of until his death. Seay also personally strived to endorse the First National Bank of Rolla, Missouri. Later, Seay would become the president of that bank as well.

== Oklahoma Territory politics ==
In 1889, Oklahoma Territory was first opened to settlers. The United States Congress, passing the Oklahoma Organic Act, officially changed the unorganized land into a government-controlled territory with its own government. US President Benjamin Harrison appointed Major George Washington Steele to serve as the territory's first governor. President Harrison also appointed Seay to serve as an Associate Justice on the territory's Supreme Court, representing the Third Judicial District. (Note: The Third District encompassed Kingfisher, Canadian, and Beaver counties (at that time commonly called No Man's Land) of the unorganized territory from the 98th to the 100th Meridian and from Kansas to Greer County, Texas.)

Justice Seay would serve on the Supreme Court throughout Governor Steele's administration. On October 18, 1891, Governor Steele resigned his position and Robert Martin, the secretary of Oklahoma Territory, became the acting governor. Seay submitted his name to President Harrison to serve as the second governor. However, it would be three months later when Harrison officially appointed Seay to the office. On February 1, 1892, Justice Seay resigned from the judiciary and was inaugurated as the second governor of Oklahoma Territory at Guthrie.

Governor Seay would be in office for only sixteen months. The Encyclopedia of Oklahoma History and Culture rated him as "...an able and effective governor." (Note: However, Logan's history reported that as a jurist, "... he cared little for precedent and did not spend much of the time in court reading court documents, but decided every question as it was presented to him right off the bat.") During his tenure as governor, he oversaw the opening of the land run of the Cheyenne-Arapaho Reserve on April 19, 1892. He oversaw the creation of six new counties, selecting county seats and appointing county officials. He also promoted the Territory's educational system by introducing a tax on liquor to help pay for schools and advocating compulsory school attendance. He also convinced the legislature to appropriate $15,000 to create an Oklahoma exhibit for the 1893 World's Fair. This showcased the territory's agriculture and business potential so effectively that the practice continued for several World's Fairs after Oklahoma became a state.

Seay's governorship came to an abrupt end when Grover Cleveland became president and appointed William Cary Renfrow governor on May 7, 1893.

== Late life ==
Seay made his home in Kingfisher, building his mansion home there in 1892, where he lived with various members of his extended family. On November 23, 1899, he organized the Central State Bank of Kingfisher. Later, the bank's name was changed to the First National Bank of Kingfisher. On October 26, 1904, the bank was taken over by the Kingfisher National Bank. Despite that takeover, Seay retained his position as bank president.

Seay was an active member of the Episcopal Church, as well as a member of the Freemasons. He suffered a fall that fractured his hip in the early 1900s. The injury worsened as Seay aged, and he was eventually forced to use a wheelchair. He was advised to move to a better climate, and so in 1909, Seay purchased a home in Long Beach, California. Seay spent the rest of his life in California until his death on December 12, 1915. His remains were returned to Oklahoma for burial and interred in the cemetery at Kingfisher, where his grave is suitably marked and next to the grave of one of his sisters, Susan Isabel Seay Collins. His funeral was held at the Masonic Temple in Guthrie. Governor of Oklahoma Robert L. Williams and his staff attended the funeral.

== Sources ==
- Meserve, John Bartlett. "The Governors of Oklahoma Territory". Chronicles of Oklahoma 20:3 (September 1942) 218–227 (accessed August 28, 2006).
- Abraham Jefferson Seay
- Chisholm Trail Museum and Governor Seay Mansion
