= Chisholm Trail =

Historic trail in the central United States used for cattle drives

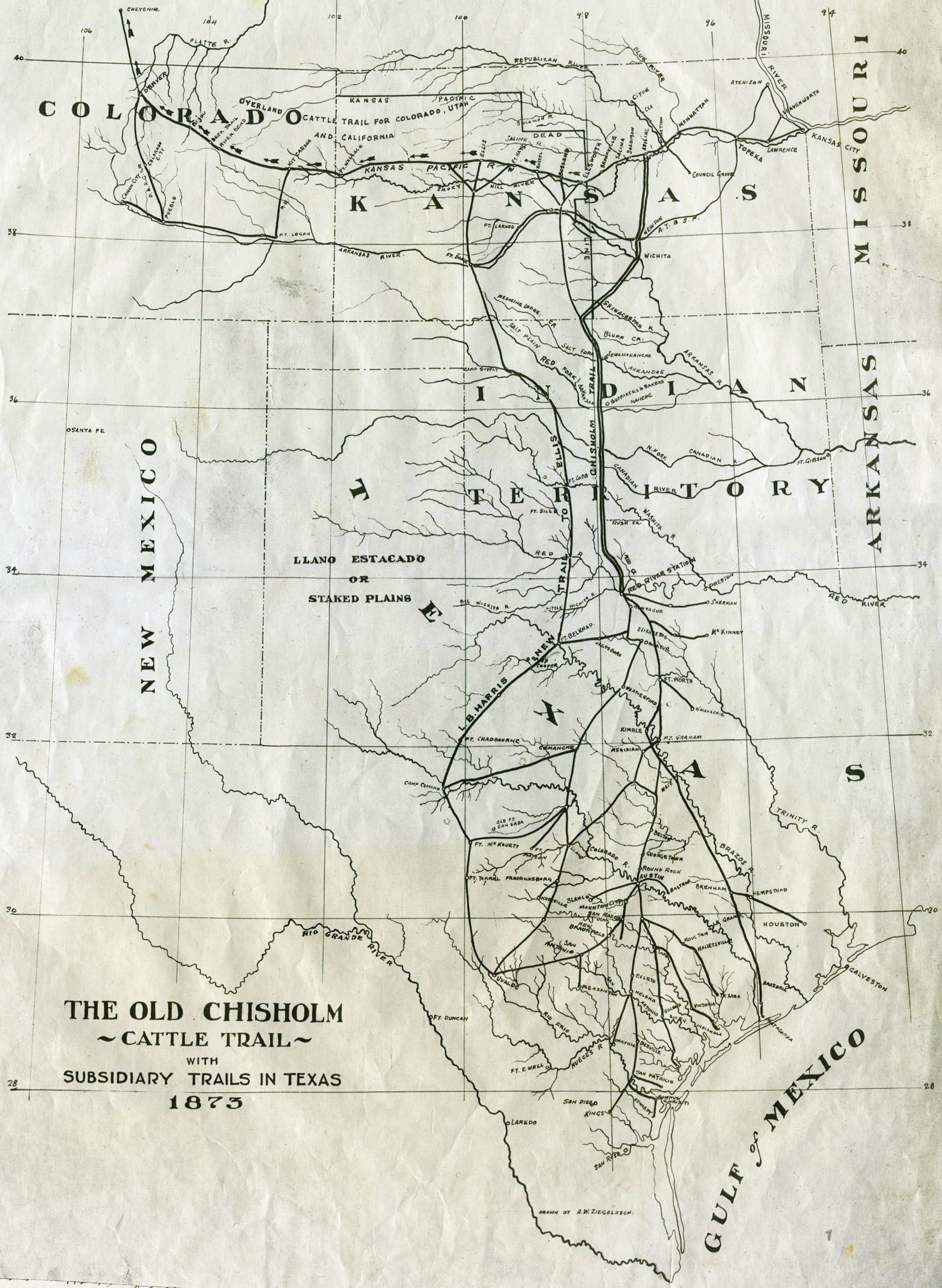
1873 Map of Chisholm Trail with Subsidiary Trails in Texas (from Kansas Historical Society)

The Chisholm Trail (/ˈtʃɪzəm/ CHIZ-əm) was a stock trail and wagon route used in the post-Civil War era to drive cattle overland from ranches in Southern Texas, across the Red River into Indian Territory, and northward to rail stops in Kansas. The trail consisted of a pathway established by Black Beaver in 1861 and a wagon road established by Jesse Chisholm around 1864. "The Chisholm Wagon Road went from Chisholm's trading post on the south Canadian River (north of Fort Arbuckle) to the Cimarron River crossing, to the Arkansas River at the future site of Wichita where Chisholm had another trading post and on north to Abilene," according to the Kraisingers. By 1869, the entire trail from Texas to Kansas became known as the Chisholm Trail.

== Overview ==
Texas ranchers using the Chisholm Trail had their cowboys start cattle drives from either the Rio Grande area or San Antonio. They joined the Chisholm Trail at the Red River, at the border between Texas and the Oklahoma Territory. They continued north to established railheads of the Kansas Pacific Railway in Abilene, Kansas, where the cattle were sold and shipped eastward. The trail is named for Jesse Chisholm, a multiracial trader from Tennessee of Cherokee and Scottish descent. Together with scout Black Beaver, he developed the trail to transport his goods from one trading post to another. The two men were the first to drive cattle north along this route.

== Business aspects ==
By 1853, Texas cattle were being driven into Missouri. Local farmers began blocking the herds and turning them back because the Texas Longhorns carried ticks that caused diseases in other species of cattle. Violence, vigilante groups, and cattle rustling caused further problems for the drovers. By 1859, the driving of cattle was outlawed in many Missouri jurisdictions. By the end of the Civil War, most cattle were being moved up the western branch of the trail, being gathered at Red River Station in Montague County, Texas.

In 1866, cattle in Texas were worth $4 per head, compared to over $40 per head in the North and East. Lack of market access during the Civil War had produced an overstock of cattle in Texas. In 1867, Joseph G. McCoy built stockyards in Abilene, Kansas. He encouraged Texas cattlemen to drive their herds to his stockyards. O. W. Wheeler answered McCoy's call, and he along with partners used the Chisholm Trail to bring a herd of 2,400 head from Texas to Abilene. This herd was the first of an estimated 5,000,000 head of Texas cattle to reach Kansas via the Chisholm Trail. McCoy's stockyards shipped 35,000 head in 1867 and became the largest stockyards west of Kansas City, Kansas.

The construction of the Union Pacific Railway through Nebraska eventually offered a cattle drive destination that was an attractive alternative to the Kansas Pacific Railroad. Between 1876 and 1884 some drives followed the Great Western Cattle Trail instead of the Chisholm Trail.

== Route ==
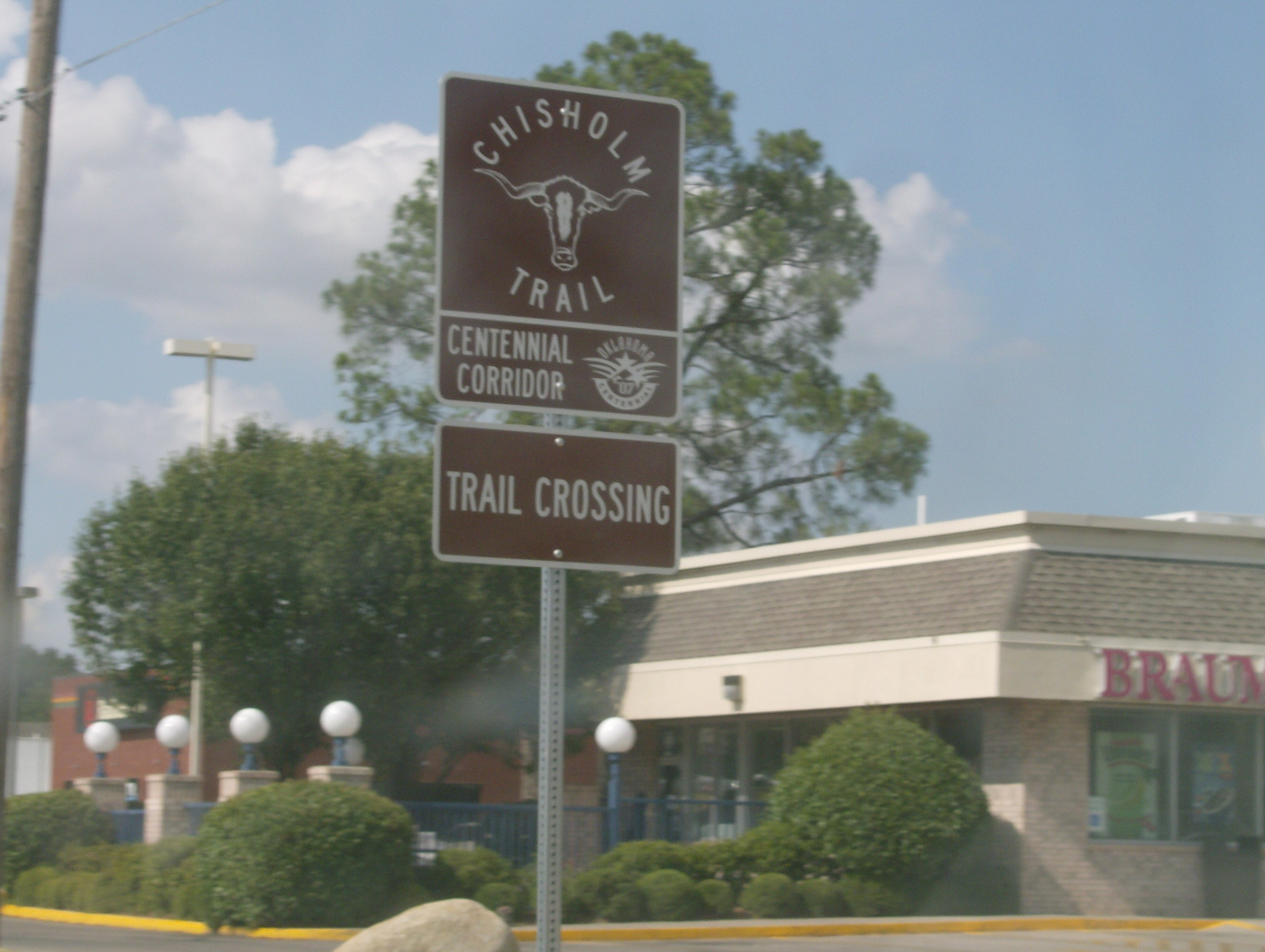
Chisholm Trail crossing through modern-day Duncan, Oklahoma

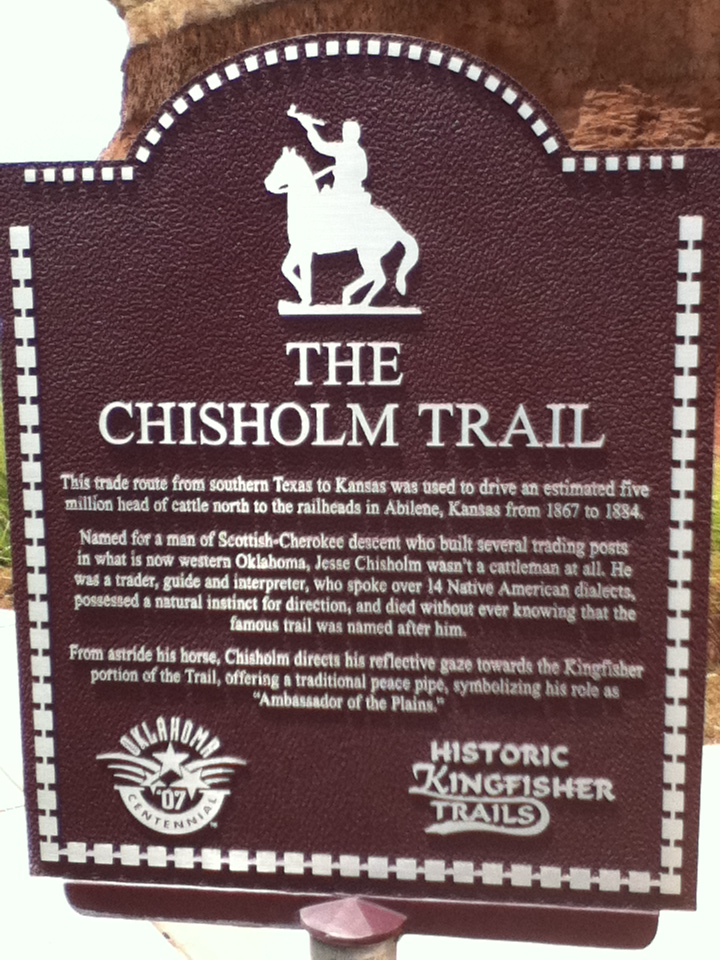
Chisholm Trail historical marker in Kingfisher, Oklahoma

In Texas, hundreds of feeder trails headed north and joined the main cattle trails. In the early 1840s, most cattle were driven up the Shawnee Trail. The Chisholm Trail was previously used by Indian hunting and raiding parties; the trail crossed into Indian Territory (present-day west-central Oklahoma) near Red River Station and entered Kansas near Caldwell. Through Oklahoma, the route of U.S. Highway 81 follows the Chisholm Trail through present-day towns of El Reno, Duncan, Chickasha, and Enid.

Historians generally consider the starting point of the Chisholm Trail to be either Donna or San Antonio. From 1867 to 1871, the trail ended in Abilene, Kansas, but as railroads were incrementally built south and westward, the end of the trail moved to other cities. Alternate routes to other cowtowns on the railroad offered less congestion and shorter routes.

The Abilene market became insignificant after 1871 as western Kansas took the lead. Ellsworth, Kansas began to see an influx of cattle on the "Ellsworth Trail" in 1872 as the route to Abilene became congested with settlers and the railroad promoted their new rail yards.

The Kansas Pacific Railway surveyed a new branch of the Chisholm Trail in Spring 1873. At the Salt Fork of the Arkansas River, it branched off to follow Pond Creek in Indian Territory and headed west to follow the creek to its headwaters before driving north, where it crossed into Kansas. From there, a new Cox's Crossing was established at Bluff Creek and a local businessman setup a store nearby.The crossing of the Arkansas River was established at Ellinwood.

The 1873 route was surveyed by William Cox, becoming "Cox's Trail" or simply the Ellsworth Trail. The railroad installed supply stores at Sewell's Ranch near the Pond Creek crossing, C.H. Stone's store at Cox's crossing of Bluff Creek, and E.C. Manning's Store at Kingman, Kansas, a short distance from the crossing of the Ninnescah River. The new route avoided settled areas and allowed better access to water along the route. Railroad employees were stationed along the trail to give guidance. Rival Atchison, Topeka and Santa Fe Railway would direct drovers to Wichita and other rail heads.

The end of the trail later moved to Newton and soon afterward to Wichita. From 1883 to 1887, the end of the trail was at Caldwell.

== Challenges ==
On the long trips—up to two months—cattlemen faced many difficulties. They had to cross major rivers such as the Arkansas and the Red and innumerable smaller creeks, as well as handle the topographic challenges of canyons, badlands, desolate plains, and low mountain ranges. Major drives typically started in the spring after the rains stimulated the growth of green grasses which the cattle would graze along the way. The spring drives, with those rains and higher water levels with the runoff, always meant more danger at the river crossings, which had few or no bridges suitable for large herds of cattle to cross. The half-wild Texas Longhorn cattle were contrary and prone to stampede with little provocation.

The days of longest sunlight, near mid-June, were also an important consideration in the timing of drives. In addition to natural dangers, the cowboys and drovers encountered rustlers and occasional conflicts with Native Americans. The cattle drives disrupted hunting and the cultivation of crops in the Indian Territory. Tribal members demanded that the trail bosses pay a toll of 10 cents per head to local tribes for the right to cross Indian lands (Oklahoma at that time was Indian Territory, governed from Fort Smith, Arkansas).

The only woman known to run her own cattle drive traveled from Texas to Wichita using the Chisholm Trail. Margaret Borland took her family, hired hands, and 2,500 Longhorns on the trail in 1873 in search of profit for her cattle, which were worth triple in Kansas over Texas prices. She died from what was called trail fever just after arriving in Wichita, after an otherwise successful journey.

== Representation in media ==
The cattle drives have been a popular topic among Western genre movies. At least 27 movies have portrayed fictional accounts of the first drive along the Chisholm Trail, including The Texans (1938), directed by James P. Hogan and starring Randolph Scott and Joan Bennett; and Red River (1948), directed by Howard Hawks and starring John Wayne and Montgomery Clift. Walter Brennan co-starred in both films.

The trail is the subject of at least two pop songs: "The Last Cowboy Song," written and recorded by Ed Bruce, also performed by The Highwaymen; and the song "The Old Chisholm Trail." Among those who have covered the song are Gene Autry, Girls of the Golden West, Woody Guthrie, Michael Martin Murphey, Tex Ritter, and Roy Rogers. Lead Belly (Huddie Ledbetter) also covered this song, although his version was titled "When I Was A Cowboy". Nova Scotia-born Wilf Carter recorded a version of the song, titled, "Come A Ty-ya Yippie Yi Yo".

== Legacy ==
Many schools in this region have been named after the Chisholm Trail, including:

- Chisholm Trail High School in Fort Worth, Texas
- Chisholm Trail Middle School in Olathe, Kansas
- Chisholm Trail Middle School in Round Rock, Texas
- Chisholm Trail Middle School in Rhome, Texas
- Chisholm Trail Elementary School in Park City, Kansas
- Chisholm Middle School in Newton, Kansas
- Chisholm High School in Enid, Oklahoma
- Chisholm Elementary School in Edmond, Oklahoma
- Chisholm Trail Elementary School in Sanger, Texas
- Chisholm Trail Elementary School in Belton. Texas

The Chisholm Trail is roughly traced by U.S. Route 81 through Oklahoma, and that state has multiple museums and sites paying respect to the trail. The Chisholm Trail Heritage Center in Duncan, Oklahoma has educational and interactive exhibits, a large monument depicting a scene from a Chisholm Trail cattle drive, and a trail walkway. Trail Ruts at Monument Hill just outside of Duncan has visible traces of cattle hoofs and wagons actually left on the trail. Kingfisher, Oklahoma, has a life-size statue of Jesse Chisholm in the middle of downtown, as well as the Chisholm Trail Museum and Governor Seay Mansion which gives a clear timeline of the trail. Yukon, Oklahoma, has the Chisholm Trail Watering Hole and historic marker, while Jesse Chisholm's gravesite is a bit further north outside Geary, Oklahoma. A mural in Enid, Oklahoma depicting the trail is located in the downtown area.

Lockhart, Texas, in Caldwell County, holds a four-day festival on the second weekend of June, to celebrate its place on the Chisholm Trail.

In 2014, the North Texas Tollway Authority constructed a 26-mile-long toll road named after the trail, the Chisholm Trail Parkway. It connects downtown Fort Worth to the nearby city of Cleburne in Johnson County. In 2017, the Texas Historical Commission released The Chisholm Trail: Exploring the Folklore and Legacy, an online tour and mobile app. The tour includes audio tracks and short videos that retell the history of communities and local heritage in towns and cities that line the route of the former Chisholm Trail.
