= Guthrie, Oklahoma =

- City
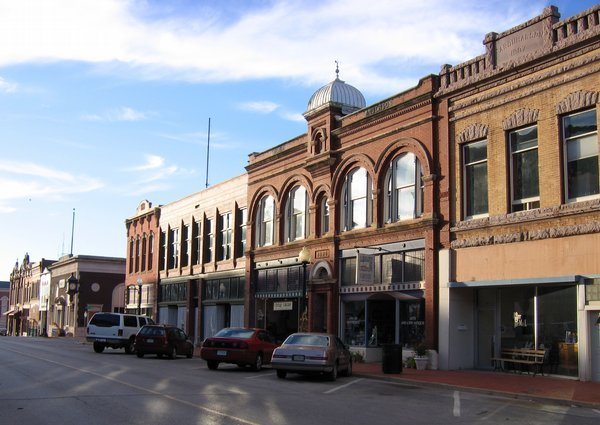
- Downtown Guthrie

- Location within Oklahoma Location within the United States
- Coordinates: 35°51′23″N 97°26′9″W
- Country: United States
- State: Oklahoma
- County: Logan
- Established: 1889

Government
  - Type: Council-Manager
  - Mayor: Adam Ropp

Area
  - Total: 18.43 sq mi (47.74 km^{2})
  - Land: 17.98 sq mi (46.58 km^{2})
  - Water: 0.45 sq mi (1.16 km^{2})
- Elevation: 1,040 ft (320 m)

Population (2020)
  - Total: 10,749
  - Density: 597.7/sq mi (230.78/km^{2})
- Time zone: UTC-6 (CST)
  - Summer (DST): UTC-5 (CDT)
- ZIP code: 73044
- Area codes: 405/572
- FIPS code: 40-31700
- GNIS feature ID: 2410678
- Website: cityofguthrie.com

- Guthrie Historic District
- U.S. National Register of Historic Places
- U.S. National Historic Landmark
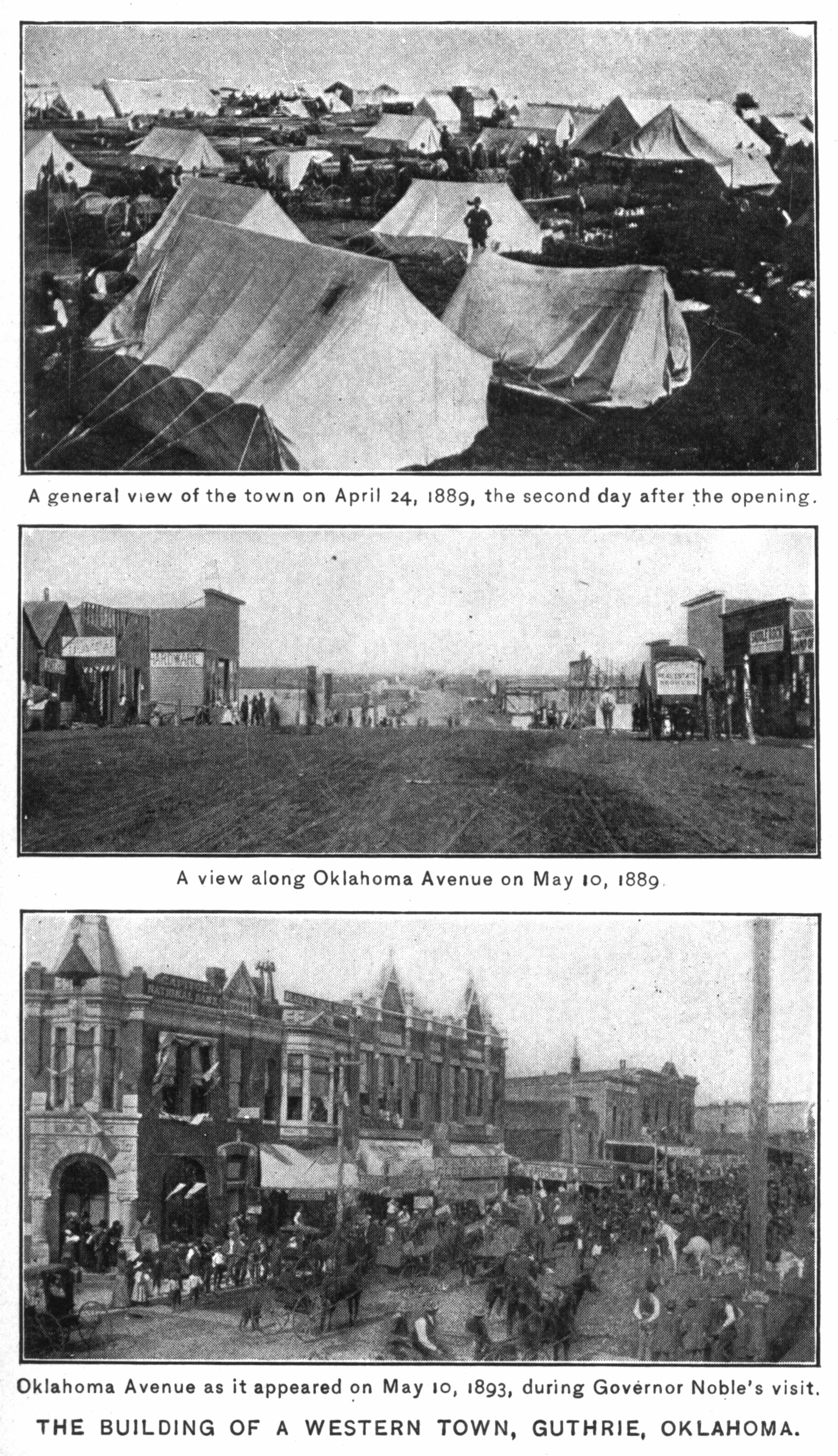
- Tent city on April 24, 1889, the second day after the opening. Two lower images are on May 10, 1889 and 1893 respectively.

- Location within Oklahoma
- Location: Guthrie, Oklahoma
- Coordinates: 35°51′23″N 97°26′9″W
- Built: 1927-29
- NRHP reference No.: 74001664

Significant dates
- Designated NRHP: June 13, 1974
- Designated NHL: January 20, 1999

Guthrie is a city in and the county seat in Logan County, Oklahoma, United States, and a part of the Oklahoma City Metroplex. As of the 2020 census, Guthrie had a population of 10,749. First known as a railroad station stop, after the Land Run of 1889, Guthrie immediately gained 10,000 new residents, who began to develop the town. It was rapidly improved and was designated as the territorial capital, and in 1907 as the first state capital of Oklahoma. In 1910, state voters chose the larger Oklahoma City as the new capital in a special election.

Guthrie is nationally significant for its collection of late 19th- and early 20th-century commercial architecture. The Guthrie Historic District includes more than 2,000 buildings and is designated as a National Historic Landmark. Historic tourism is important to the city, and its Victorian architecture provides a backdrop for Wild West and territorial-style entertainment, carriage tours, replica trolley cars, specialty shops, and art galleries.

== History ==
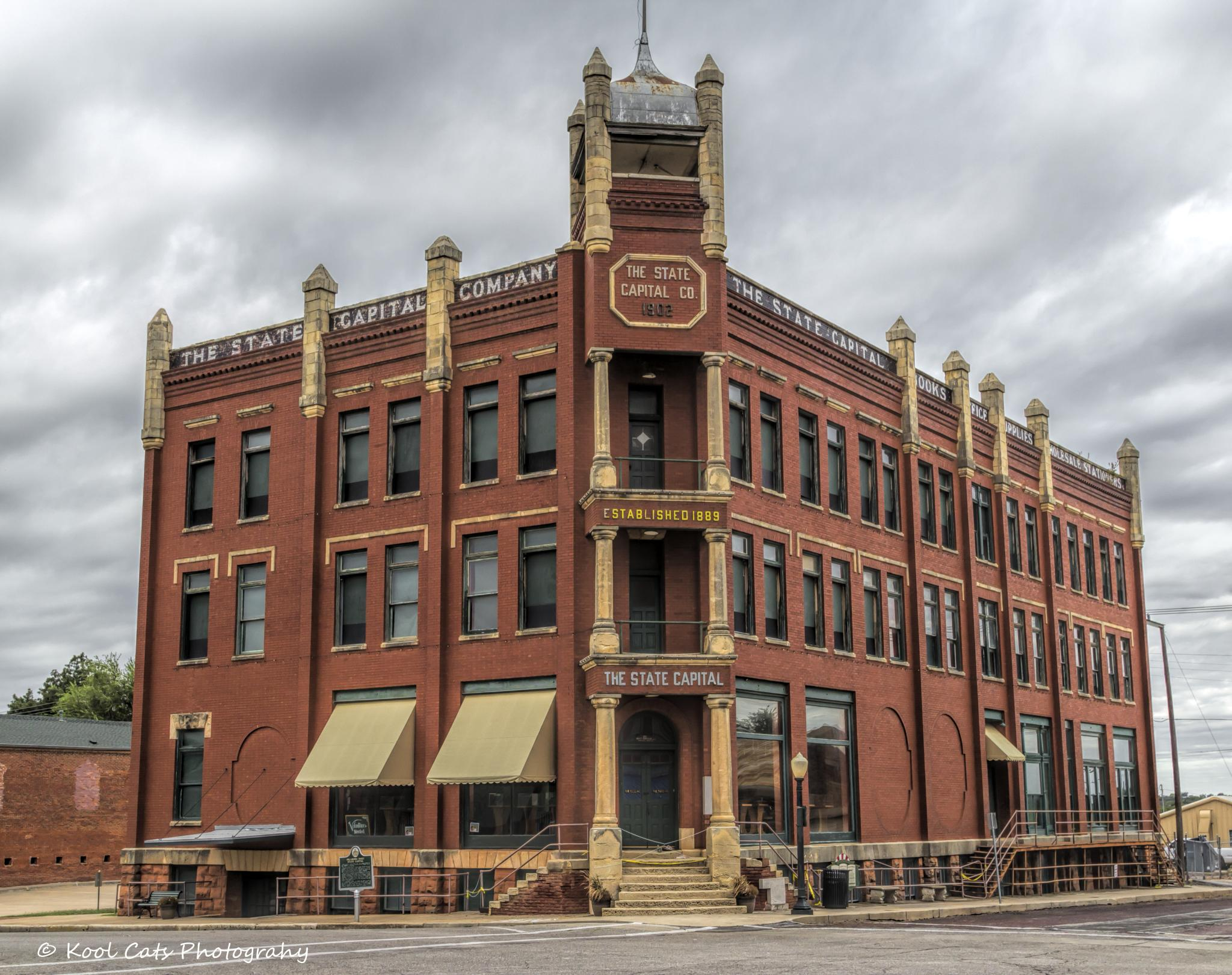
Oklahoma State Capital Company Building in Guthrie

Guthrie was established in 1887 as a railroad station called Deer Creek on the Southern Kansas Railway—later acquired by the Atchison, Topeka and Santa Fe Railway ("AT&SF")-- running from the Kansas–Oklahoma border to Purcell. The name was later changed to Guthrie, named for jurist John Guthrie of Topeka, Kansas. A post office was established on April 4, 1889.

In 1889, some 50,000 potential settlers gathered at the edges of the Unassigned Lands in hopes of staking a claim to a plot. At noon on April 22, 1889, cannons resounded at a 2,000,000-acre (810,000 ha; 8,100 km^{2}) section of Indian Territory, launching president Benjamin Harrison's "Hoss Race" or Land Run of 1889. People ran for both farmlands and towns.

During the next six hours, about 10,000 people settled in what became the capital of the new Territory of Oklahoma. Within months, Guthrie was developed as a modern brick-and-stone "Queen of the Prairie" with municipal water, electricity, a mass-transit system, and underground parking garages for horses and carriages.

Guthrie's western heritage includes the fact that, on April 13, 1898, outlaw Richard "Little Dick" West, a former member of the Wild Bunch gang, was in town when approached by legendary lawmen Heck Thomas and Bill Tilghman. He refused to surrender, and was killed in the resulting gunfight. He is buried in the Summit View Cemetery in Guthrie near outlaw Bill Doolin.

Guthrie’s early connection with rail travel was not completely defined by the AT&SF. Two other railroads indirectly served Guthrie, being the Guthrie and Kingfisher Railway and the Guthrie and Western Railway, which together connected the rails of the Chicago, Rock Island and Pacific Railroad (“Rock Island”) at Kingfisher with the AT&SF trackage serving Guthrie from a point near the town of Seward (just southwest of Guthrie) beginning in 1900. Another railroad, the Fort Smith and Western Railway, reached town from the east in 1903. Guthrie got its own streetcar service, the Guthrie Railway, in 1905, which constructed about 6.5 miles of rails. And, the Oklahoma Railway Company finished a 31-mile interurban line between Oklahoma City and Guthrie in 1916.

Hobart Johnstone Whitley, later known as the "Father of Hollywood, was the first president of the Guthrie Chamber of Commerce. Whitley built the first brick block building in the territory for his National Loan and Trust Company. He was asked by the local people to be the first governor of Oklahoma. Whitley traveled to Washington, DC, where he persuaded the U.S. Congress to allow Guthrie to be the new capital of the future state of Oklahoma. This was specified in the 1906 Oklahoma Enabling Act, which established certain requirements for the new state constitution. By 1907, when Guthrie became the state capital, it looked like a well-established Eastern city.

Guthrie prospered as the administrative center of the territory, but it was eclipsed in economic influence by Oklahoma City early in the 20th century. Oklahoma City had become a major junction for several railroads and had also attracted a major industry in the form of meat packing. Oklahoma City business leaders began campaigning soon after statehood to make Oklahoma City the new state capital, and in 1910, a special election was held to determine the location of the state capital; 96,488 votes were cast for Oklahoma City; 31,031 for Guthrie; and 8,382 for Shawnee. Governor Charles N. Haskell, who was in Tulsa on the day of the election, ordered his secretary W. B. Anthony to have Oklahoma Secretary of State Bill Cross obtain the state seal and transport it to Oklahoma City, despite having been served a restraining order by Logan County Sheriff John Mahoney blocking the transfer. Anthony obtained written authorization from Cross, retrieved the seal from the Logan County courthouse, and delivered it to Oklahoma City.

After the capital was transferred, Guthrie lost much of its government-related business and numerous residents. It began to dwindle in size and soon lost its status as Oklahoma's second-largest city, initially to Muskogee, then later to Tulsa. A challenge to the new state capital was heard in the Oklahoma Supreme Court; it upheld the election and moved in its ruling on February 9, 1911, as did the United States Supreme Court the same year.

n 1933, Claver College was founded by Sr Joseph O'Connor, a Benedictine religious sister from St. Joseph's Monastery in Tulsa, to serve the African American population of Guthrie. The college was supported with funding from Katharine Drexel (who had founded Xavier University of Louisiana, the nation's only Catholic HBCU, in 1925). The college was named after Peter Claver, a Jesuit missionary and the patron saint of African-American ministry. The college, a night school, operated out of a building that also hosted a grocery store. It ceased operations in 1944, and its former place of operation, the floodplain neighborhood of "Little Africa", was later destroyed. It has since experienced sustained restoration efforts.

The center district of Guthrie was designated a National Historic Landmark by the National Park Service in 1999, in recognition of the city's importance to state history, as well as its rich architecture.

On May 24th 2011 a Long Tracking EF5 tornado hit western north side of Guthrie causing EF2 to EF3 damage, fortunately the main city was spared

=== Culture ===
As a result of Guthrie's early loss of prominence, it has a well-preserved Victorian enclave. Whereas growth and inattentive urban planning caused other Oklahoma towns such as Oklahoma City to destroy much of their early downtown architecture, much of the entire central business and residential district of Guthrie is intact.

The National Finals Steer Roping Rodeo is held in Guthrie. On six occasions, Texas rodeo promoter Dan Taylor was chute director for the competition in Guthrie.

Historical tourism has become a significant industry for the town. Guthrie is the largest urban historic district in Oklahoma, containing 2,169 buildings, 1,400 acres (567 ha; 5.67 km^{2}), and 400 city blocks. Guthrie is a "Certified City"; it has received a Community Development Block Grant to inventory infrastructure features for capital-improvement planning.

To the south of Guthrie lie Liberty Lake and Guthrie Lake. Its museums include the Oklahoma Territorial Museum; it hosts the Oklahoma International Bluegrass Festival, which draws 15,000 visitors annually. In addition, Guthrie claims to be the "Bed and Breakfast" capital of Oklahoma.

Guthrie also hosts the Guthrie Scottish Rite Masonic Temple, one of the world's largest Masonic centers, which in years past has brought artists such as Henry Mancini, Lena Horne, Victor Borge, and Luciano Pavarotti to local audiences.

Guthrie has Oklahoma's oldest year-round professional theatre company, the Pollard Theatre Company. With an emphasis on creative story-telling to illuminate the shared human experience, the Pollard produces six or more plays and musicals annually, enlisting artists across the United States. The annual holiday favorite is A Territorial Christmas Carol.

Guthrie is served by the Guthrie News-Leader newspaper.

== Geography ==
Guthrie lies along one of the primary corridors into Texas and Mexico, and is a four-hour drive from the Dallas-Fort Worth metropolitan area. The city is located in the Frontier Country region in the center of the state. It is about 32 miles (51 km) north of Oklahoma City.

According to the United States Census Bureau, the city has a total area of 19.2 square miles (50 km^{2}), of which 0.5 sq mi (1.3 km^{2}) is covered by water. The total area is 2.81 percent water.

Guthrie is in the Sandstone Hills region of Oklahoma, known for hills of 250 to 400 feet (76 to 122 m) and oak forests and an ecological region known as the Cross Timbers.

=== Climate ===
Guthrie has a humid subtropical climate, with frequent variations in weather daily and seasonally, except during the consistently hot and humid summer months. Consistent winds, usually from the south or south-southeast during the summer, help temper the hotter weather. Consistent northerly winds during the winter can intensify cold periods.

Climate data for Guthrie, Oklahoma
Month	Jan	Feb	Mar	Apr	May	Jun	Jul	Aug	Sep	Oct	Nov	Dec	Year
Mean daily maximum °F (°C)	48.0 (8.9)	53.8 (12.1)	64.1 (17.8)	74.4 (23.6)	81.6 (27.6)	89.3 (31.8)	95.5 (35.3)	94.9 (34.9)	86.1 (30.1)	75.7 (24.3)	61.7 (16.5)	51.1 (10.6)	73.0 (22.8)
Mean daily minimum °F (°C)	24.6 (−4.1)	29.5 (−1.4)	38.5 (3.6)	49.2 (9.6)	57.7 (14.3)	66.4 (19.1)	71.0 (21.7)	69.5 (20.8)	62.2 (16.8)	50.5 (10.3)	38.9 (3.8)	28.6 (−1.9)	48.9 (9.4)
Average precipitation inches (mm)	1.2 (30)	1.7 (43)	2.8 (71)	2.7 (69)	5.0 (130)	4.2 (110)	2.3 (58)	2.3 (58)	4.3 (110)	2.7 (69)	2.3 (58)	1.5 (38)	32.9 (840)
Source 1: weather.com
Source 2: Weatherbase

== Demographics ==
Historical population
Census	Pop.	Note	%±
1890	5,333		—
1900	10,006		87.6%
1910	11,654		16.5%
1920	11,757		0.9%
1930	9,582		−18.5%
1940	10,018		4.6%
1950	10,113		0.9%
1960	9,502		−6.0%
1970	9,575		0.8%
1980	10,312		7.7%
1990	10,518		2.0%
2000	9,925		−5.6%
2010	10,191		2.7%
2020	10,749		5.5%
U.S. Decennial Census

=== 2020 census ===
As of the 2020 census, Guthrie had a population of 10,749. The median age was 38.5 years. 23.7% of residents were under the age of 18 and 19.0% of residents were 65 years of age or older. For every 100 females there were 91.0 males, and for every 100 females age 18 and over there were 87.2 males age 18 and over.

82.9% of residents lived in urban areas, while 17.1% lived in rural areas.

There were 4,198 households in Guthrie, of which 31.4% had children under the age of 18 living in them. Of all households, 40.1% were married-couple households, 18.5% were households with a male householder and no spouse or partner present, and 34.3% were households with a female householder and no spouse or partner present. About 32.0% of all households were made up of individuals and 14.6% had someone living alone who was 65 years of age or older.

There were 4,748 housing units, of which 11.6% were vacant. Among occupied housing units, 55.6% were owner-occupied and 44.4% were renter-occupied. The homeowner vacancy rate was 3.0% and the rental vacancy rate was 8.2%.

Racial composition as of the 2020 census
Race	Percent
White	71.4%
Black or African American	11.2%
American Indian and Alaska Native	3.2%
Asian	0.5%
Native Hawaiian and Other Pacific Islander	0%
Some other race	3.1%
Two or more races	10.6%
Hispanic or Latino (of any race)	7.4%

=== 2000 census ===
As of the 2000 census, 9,925 people, 3,854 households, and 2,474 families were residing in the city. The population density was 531.6 inhabitants per square mile (205.3/km^{2}). The 4,308 housing units had an average density of 230.7 per square mile (89.1/km^{2}). The racial makeup of the city was 75.84% White, 15.77% African American, 2.97% Native American, 0.42% Asian, 1.96% from other races, and 3.03% from two or more races. Hispanics or Latinos of any race were 3.79% of the population.

Of the 3,854 households, 29.2% had children under 18 living with them, 46.7% were married couples living together, 14.2% had a female householder with no husband present, and 35.8% were not families. About 32.1% of all households were made up of individuals, and 15.1% had someone living alone who was 65 or older. The average household size was 2.37 and the average family size was 2.99.

In the city, the age distribution was 24.7% under 18, 11.5% from 18 to 24, 24.7% from 25 to 44, 21.4% from 45 to 64, and 17.7% who were 65 or older. The median age was 37 years. For every 100 females, there were 86.3 males. For every 100 females 18 and over, there were 79.9 males.

The median income for a household in the city was $30,460, and for a family was $38,732. Males had a median income of $27,948 versus $21,186 for females. The per capita income for the city was $15,774. About 9.8% of families and 17.3% of the population were below the poverty line, including 18.1% of those under 18 and 18.4% of those 65 or over.

== In Media ==
=== Film ===
Several films have been shot in whole or in part within the city:

- Parts of Fast Charlie... the Moonbeam Rider (1979) were filmed in Guthrie.
- Guthrie's main street can be seen briefly in the movie Rain Man (1988) starring Dustin Hoffman and Tom Cruise.
- My Heroes Have Always Been Cowboys (1991) was filmed in Guthrie. Ben Johnson played Jesse Dalton.
- Twister (1996), the Warner Bros. movie starring Bill Paxton and Helen Hunt, used this town for the drive-in scene. In the original screenplay for this movie, it was going to be destroyed instead of Wakita.
- Public Enemies (1996) with Theresa Russell
- Elizabethtown (2005), a Cameron Crowe film
- Fingerprints (2006)
- The Killer Inside Me (2010) was filmed in Guthrie starring Jessica Alba, Kate Hudson, and Casey Affleck.
- Rudderless (2014) - directed by William H. Macy, starring Billy Crudup and Anton Yelchin
- Hellraiser: Judgment (2018) from the Hellraiser franchise
- The Girl Who Believes in Miracles (2021)
- Stillwater (2021) with Matt Damon
- Reagan (2024), the Ronald Reagan biography

=== Literature ===
- The protagonist of the Adam Binder series of fantasy novels is originally from Guthrie, as is series author David R. Slayton.
- Guthrie was the setting for The Curse of Yig, a horror story written by H. P. Lovecraft and Zealia Bishop.

== Notable people ==
- Byron Berline, bluegrass musician
- Leon Breeden, musician, educator, director of music at North Texas State University
- John Hazelton Cotteral, United States district and appellate judge
- Bill Doolin, the outlaw who founded the Wild Bunch, is interred at Summit View Cemetery in Guthrie.
- Dennis Thomas Flynn, postmaster and delegate to the territorial convention
- Helen Holmes, journalist, historian, Women's Army Corps officer, mayor of Guthrie
- Jerry Hopper, film and television director, was born in Guthrie.
- Joshua Key, United States Army soldier who deserted to Canada due to his opposition to the Iraq War
- France Laux, baseball broadcaster for St. Louis Cardinals, was born in Guthrie.
- Carrie Nation, Prohibition advocate and publisher of The Hatchet
- Ted Power, former professional baseball player, was born in Guthrie.
- Peter Ramondetta, professional skateboarder, was raised in Guthrie.
- Horace Speed, first district attorney for Oklahoma Territory, continued to live and practice law in Guthrie until 1913.
- Gene Stephenson, former Wichita State University baseball coach
- Phil Stephenson, former MLB player
- W.K. Stratton, author and journalist, was born and educated in Guthrie.
- Stanley Vestal, author of the American Old West, was partly reared in Guthrie.
- Hobart Johnstone Whitley, land developer, banker, Rock Island Railroad executive
- Marjorie Strider, artist
