= Seward, Oklahoma =

- Census-designated place
- Location within Oklahoma Location within the United States
- Coordinates: 35°47′48″N 97°29′13″W
- Country: United States
- State: Oklahoma
- County: Logan

Area
  - Total: 0.11 sq mi (0.28 km^{2})
  - Land: 0.11 sq mi (0.28 km^{2})
  - Water: 0 sq mi (0.00 km^{2})
- Elevation: 1,017 ft (310 m)

Population (2020)
  - Total: 26
  - Density: 240.9/sq mi (93.03/km^{2})
- Time zone: UTC-6 (Central (CST))
  - Summer (DST): UTC-5 (CDT)
- ZIP code: 73083
- Area codes: 405/572
- GNIS feature ID: 2805355

Seward is an unincorporated community and census-designated place (CDP) in Logan County, Oklahoma, United States. As of the 2020 census, Seward had a population of 26. Seward is 7 miles (11 km) south-southwest of Guthrie. Seward had a post office from May 15, 1889, to July 11, 1969. The community is named after William H. Seward.

The transmitter for KOSU (91.7 MHz FM) is located about 3 miles west of Seward.

== Demographics ==
Historical population
Census	Pop.	Note	%±
2020	26		—
U.S. Decennial Census

=== 2020 census ===
As of the 2020 census, Seward had a population of 26. The median age was 37.0 years. 34.6% of residents were under the age of 18 and 23.1% of residents were 65 years of age or older. For every 100 females there were 62.5 males, and for every 100 females age 18 and over there were 54.5 males age 18 and over.

0.0% of residents lived in urban areas, while 100.0% lived in rural areas.

There were 14 households in Seward, of which 50.0% had children under the age of 18 living in them. Of all households, 42.9% were married-couple households, 21.4% were households with a male householder and no spouse or partner present, and 21.4% were households with a female householder and no spouse or partner present. About 7.1% of all households were made up of individuals and 0.0% had someone living alone who was 65 years of age or older.

There were 14 housing units, of which 0.0% were vacant. The homeowner vacancy rate was 0.0% and the rental vacancy rate was 0.0%.

Racial composition as of the 2020 census
Race	Number	Percent
White	11	42.3%
Black or African American	7	26.9%
American Indian and Alaska Native	1	3.8%
Asian	1	3.8%
Native Hawaiian and Other Pacific Islander	2	7.7%
Some other race	0	0.0%
Two or more races	4	15.4%
Hispanic or Latino (of any race)	2	7.7%
