= Kingfisher, Oklahoma =

Kingfisher, Oklahoma Nowuukoh' Owuu' (Arapaho) Noma'héo'hé'e (Cheyenne)
- City
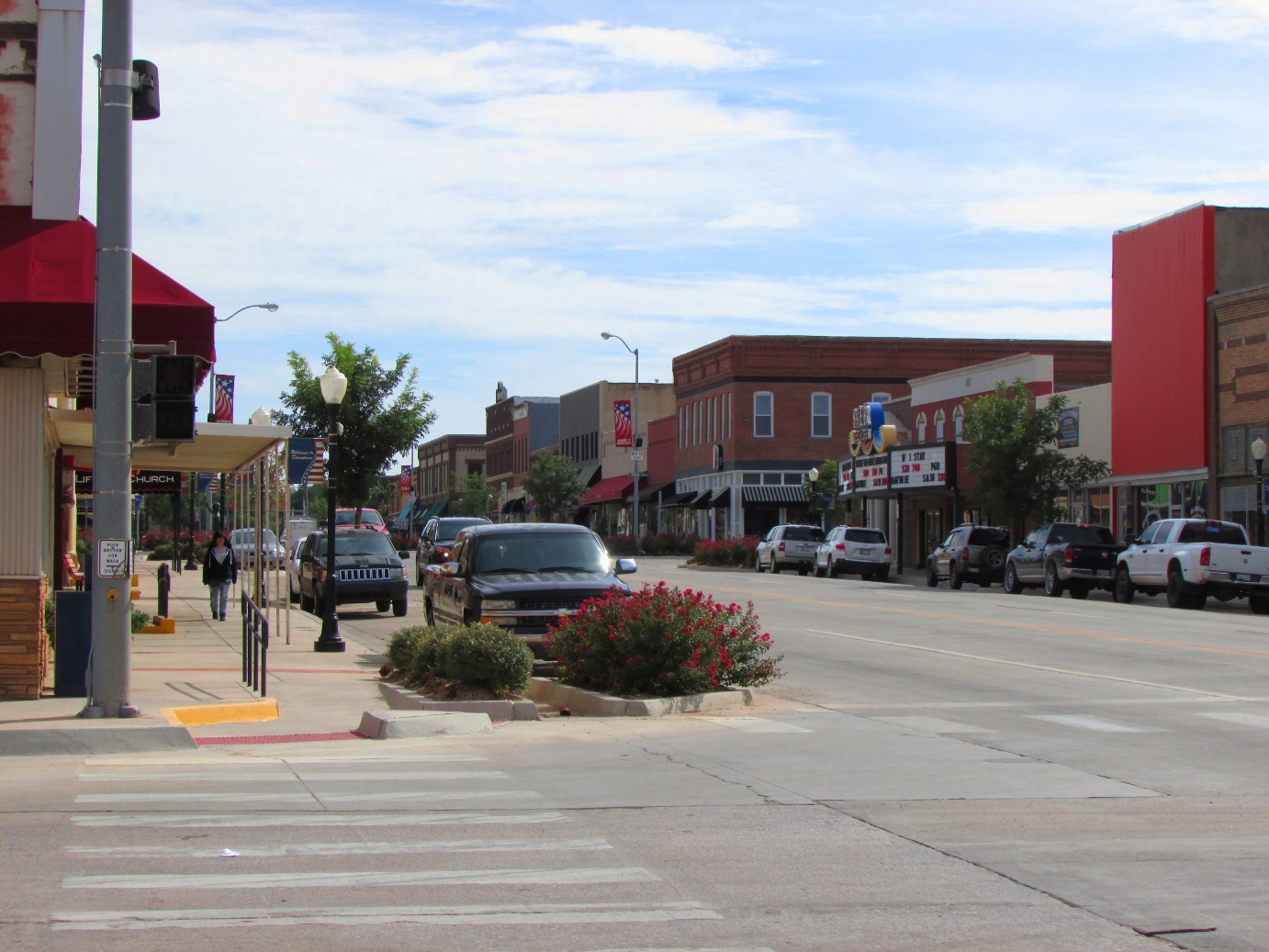
- Downtown Kingfisher in September 2014

- Location in Oklahoma and the United States Kingfisher (the United States)
- Coordinates: 35°51′22″N 97°56′20″W
- Country: United States
- State: Oklahoma
- County: Kingfisher

Area
  - Total: 4.52 sq mi (11.71 km^{2})
  - Land: 4.46 sq mi (11.56 km^{2})
  - Water: 0.058 sq mi (0.15 km^{2})
- Elevation: 1,089 ft (332 m)

Population (2020)
  - Total: 4,903
  - Density: 1,098.5/sq mi (424.12/km^{2})
- Time zone: UTC-6 (Central (CST))
  - Summer (DST): UTC-5 (CDT)
- ZIP code: 73750
- Area codes: 405/572
- FIPS code: 40-39850
- GNIS feature ID: 2411546
- Website: kingfisher.org

Kingfisher is a city in and the county seat of Kingfisher County, Oklahoma. The population was 4,903 at the time of the 2020 census. It is the former home and namesake of Kingfisher College. According to the Encyclopedia of Oklahoma History and Culture, Kingfisher is now primarily a bedroom community for people employed in Enid and Oklahoma City.

== History ==
=== 19th century ===
Kingfisher came into existence on April 22, 1889, when land owned by the federal government was opened to settlement by "land run". A huge area in what is now central Oklahoma was literally "peopled" by non-Native Americans overnight. The city is situated on a part of the Chisholm Trail, over which millions of Texas longhorns were driven to railheads in Kansas in the years immediately following the Civil War. Extension of the railroads and settlement of the open range ended this colorful era.

The town was named for an early resident who several landmarks were named for, a man named King Fisher.

The bill that opened Oklahoma Territory to non-Indian settlement limited the sizes of townsites to 320 acres (130 ha). Settlers in the Kingfisher area formed two communities: Kingfisher City, on the north side of the settlement, and Lisbon, on the south side. The two merged on June 14, 1890, and the resulting town was named Kingfisher. Oklahoma Territory was organized May 2, 1890, and consisted of the Unassigned Lands and the Panhandle. The Western District included present-day Kingfisher County, part of Canadian County and the Panhandle. Abraham Jefferson Seay, a Missouri native, was appointed as District Judge and moved to Kingfisher. In 1892, Seay was appointed as the second territorial governor by President Benjamin Harrison.

Railroads helped with Kingfisher’s growth: the Chicago, Kansas and Nebraska Railway (later part of the Rock Island) built through the area, the first passenger train arriving on October 23, 1889.

=== 20th century ===
The Coleman Company was founded in Kingfisher by W. C. Coleman in 1900.

In 1900, the Guthrie and Kingfisher Railway—also later part of the Rock Island—built east from Kingfisher, while the Guthrie and Western Railway—an affiliate of the Santa Fe Railroad—built west from Seward, Oklahoma, meeting at a point that became Cashion, Oklahoma, and giving Kingfisher access to the territorial capitol of Guthrie and the Santa Fe system. The Kingfisher to Seward line was abandoned in pieces in 1934 and 1937, but Kingfisher still has freight rail service on what is now the Union Pacific Railroad.

The Kingfisher County Development Foundation was created in 1958 for the purpose of assisting and promoting industrial, economic and civic growth within, and surrounding the Kingfisher area of Oklahoma.A present K.C.D.F. strategy includes the investment for development of the Kingfisher Industrial Park. The industrial park is located just south of Kingfisher, further closing the gap between Oklahoma City and Kingfisher. Kingfisher has quickly become a suburban community of the Oklahoma City Metropolitan Statistical Area, already home to many commuters to Oklahoma City. Kingfisher is a Certified City and has received a Community Development Block Grant to inventory infrastructure features for Capital Improvement Planning (CIP).

=== 21st century ===
On August 19, 2007, the city was 25% flooded when Kingfisher Creek and Uncle John Creek overflowed their banks, the result of heavy rain from Tropical Depression Erin. One woman died from drowning in the flood.

== Geography ==
Kingfisher is located south-central Kingfisher County 42 miles (68 km) northwest of Oklahoma City. U.S. Route 81 (Main Street) passes through the center of town, leading north 38 miles (61 km) to Enid and south 23 miles (37 km) to El Reno. Oklahoma State Highway 3 (Broadway Avenue) crosses US 81 in the center of town, leading east 29 miles (47 km) to Guthrie and west 27 miles (43 km) to Watonga.

According to the United States Census Bureau, Kingfisher has a total area of 4.1 square miles (10.6 km^{2}), of which 0.04 square miles (0.1 km^{2}), or 1.21%, are water. The city is drained by Kingfisher Creek, a northeast-flowing tributary of the Cimarron River.

=== Climate ===
Climate data for Kingfisher, Oklahoma
Month	Jan	Feb	Mar	Apr	May	Jun	Jul	Aug	Sep	Oct	Nov	Dec	Year
Record high °F (°C)	85 (29)	93 (34)	100 (38)	103 (39)	105 (41)	113 (45)	115 (46)	118 (48)	110 (43)	101 (38)	90 (32)	88 (31)	118 (48)
Mean daily maximum °F (°C)	47.4 (8.6)	53.8 (12.1)	63.3 (17.4)	72.4 (22.4)	80.5 (26.9)	89.5 (31.9)	95.2 (35.1)	94.3 (34.6)	85.8 (29.9)	74.9 (23.8)	60.0 (15.6)	49.9 (9.9)	72.4 (22.4)
Mean daily minimum °F (°C)	24.5 (−4.2)	29.4 (−1.4)	37.8 (3.2)	46.7 (8.2)	56.7 (13.7)	65.8 (18.8)	70.5 (21.4)	69.2 (20.7)	61.4 (16.3)	49.7 (9.8)	37.1 (2.8)	27.8 (−2.3)	48.2 (9.0)
Record low °F (°C)	−16 (−27)	−20 (−29)	−3 (−19)	15 (−9)	28 (−2)	45 (7)	51 (11)	44 (7)	29 (−2)	12 (−11)	6 (−14)	−14 (−26)	−20 (−29)
Average precipitation inches (mm)	1.14 (29)	1.51 (38)	2.66 (68)	3.23 (82)	5.01 (127)	4.32 (110)	2.22 (56)	2.75 (70)	3.53 (90)	2.57 (65)	2.38 (60)	1.63 (41)	32.95 (837)
Average snowfall inches (cm)	1.8 (4.6)	0.7 (1.8)	0.1 (0.25)	0 (0)	0 (0)	0 (0)	0 (0)	0 (0)	0 (0)	0 (0)	0.3 (0.76)	1.1 (2.8)	4.1 (10)
Average relative humidity (%)	72	70	71	69	73	69	60	60	65	69	73	75	69
Source: Oklahoma Climatological Survey

== Demographics ==
Historical population
Census	Pop.	Note	%±
1890	1,134		—
1900	2,301		102.9%
1910	2,538		10.3%
1920	2,446		−3.6%
1930	2,726		11.4%
1940	3,352		23.0%
1950	3,345		−0.2%
1960	3,249		−2.9%
1970	4,042		24.4%
1980	4,245		5.0%
1990	4,095		−3.5%
2000	4,380		7.0%
2010	4,633		5.8%
2020	4,903		5.8%
U.S. Decennial Census

=== 2020 census ===
As of the 2020 census, Kingfisher had a population of 4,903. The median age was 38.5 years. 26.4% of residents were under the age of 18 and 19.1% of residents were 65 years of age or older. For every 100 females there were 94.3 males, and for every 100 females age 18 and over there were 91.5 males age 18 and over.

0% of residents lived in urban areas, while 100.0% lived in rural areas.

There were 1,822 households in Kingfisher, of which 35.3% had children under the age of 18 living in them. Of all households, 49.3% were married-couple households, 18.2% were households with a male householder and no spouse or partner present, and 27.6% were households with a female householder and no spouse or partner present. About 29.0% of all households were made up of individuals and 16.1% had someone living alone who was 65 years of age or older.

There were 2,049 housing units, of which 11.1% were vacant. Among occupied housing units, 69.2% were owner-occupied and 30.8% were renter-occupied. The homeowner vacancy rate was 2.2% and the rental vacancy rate was 14.5%.

Racial composition as of the 2020 census
Race	Percent
White	75.7%
Black or African American	1.8%
American Indian and Alaska Native	3.6%
Asian	0.5%
Native Hawaiian and Other Pacific Islander	0%
Some other race	8.7%
Two or more races	9.7%
Hispanic or Latino (of any race)	16.9%

=== 2010 census ===
As of the census of 2010, there were 4,633 people, 1,804 households, and 1,217 families residing in the city. The racial makeup of the city was 83.9% White, 1.6% African American, 3.8% Native American, 0.5% Asian, 6.9% from other races, and 3.3% from two or more races. Hispanic or Latino of any race were 12.4% of the population.

There were 1,804 households, out of which 28.4% had children under the age of 18 living with them, 51.5% were married couples living together, 10.6% had a female householder with no husband present, and 32.5% were non-families while 29.2% of all households were made up of individuals. The average household size was 2.5 and the average family size was 3.06. The median age was 37 years. 52.1% of the population was female and 47.9% male.

As of the 2013 American Community Survey, the median income for a household in the city was $49,727, and the median income for a family was $59,408. Males had a median full-time income of $49,444 versus $32,996 for females. The per capita income for the city was $24,363. About 7.7% of families and 5.8% of the population were below the poverty line, including 7.9% of those under age 18 and 9.6% of those age 65 or over.

== Places of interest ==
Kingfisher's only permanent tourist attraction is the Chisholm Museum, which houses the Gov. Seay Mansion. This facility preserves relics and information of the community's unique heritage.

== Government ==
Kingfisher has a commission-manager government.

== Newspaper ==
A newspaper was published in Kingfisher from 1889 to 1963 under the names Kingfisher Free Press, The New World, Kingfisher Weekly Free Press, and Kingfisher Weekly Star and Free Press.

== Notable people ==
- George S. Benson, missionary, college administrator, conservative political activist and segregationist
- Don Blanding, poet
- Sol Butler, pioneering black Olympian and 1920s NFL player
- Arthur A. Collins, founder of Collins Radio Company
- Elmer Crumbley, jazz trombonist
- Erna P. Harris, journalist
- Curtis Lofton, NFL linebacker for the Oakland Raiders
- Carl Mays, MLB pitcher, 4-time World Series champion
- Joe Redington, founder of the Iditarod Sled Dog Race
- Abraham Jefferson Seay, Associate Justice of the Oklahoma Territorial Supreme Court and the third Governor of Oklahoma Territory
- Jace Sternberger, American football player
- James "Bud" Walton, co-founder of Walmart
- Sam Walton, founder of Walmart and Sam's Club
