= List of governors of Oklahoma =

List of People that were the Head of Government of Oklahoma

Standard of the governor of Oklahoma

The governor of Oklahoma is the head of government of the U.S. state of Oklahoma.

== List of governors ==
=== Oklahoma Territory ===
Oklahoma Territory was organized on May 2, 1890. It had seven governors appointed by the president of the United States.

Governors of the Territory of Oklahoma
No.	Governor	Term in office (Note: The range given is from the date the governor was confirmed by the Senate, or appointed by the President during a Senate recess, to the date the governor's successor was confirmed, unless noted.)	Appointed by
1	George Washington Steele (1839–1922)	May 14, 1890 (Note: Steele was nominated on May 10, 1890; confirmed by the Senate on May 14; and arrived in the territory on May 22.) – November 8, 1891 (544 days; resigned) (Note: Steele resigned due to frustration with the legislature. Territorial Secretary Robert Martin acted as governor until his successor arrived.)	Benjamin Harrison
2	Abraham Jefferson Seay (1832–1915)	January 18, 1892 (Note: Seay was nominated on January 5, 1892; confirmed by the Senate on January 18; and took the oath of office on February 2.) – May 6, 1893 (476 days; replaced) (Note: McMullin & Walker say Seay resigned when Grover Cleveland became president, but Cleveland's nomination of his successor specifies he is being removed.)	Benjamin Harrison
3	William Cary Renfrow (1845–1922)	May 6, 1893 (Note: Renfrow was appointed on May 6, 1893, during a Senate recess; nominated on August 18; and confirmed by the Senate on August 22. He was inaugurated on May 10.) – May 11, 1897 (1467 days; resigned) (Note: The nomination of Renfrow's successor specifies that Renfrow resigned but no reason is given.)	Grover Cleveland
4	Cassius McDonald Barnes (1845–1925)	May 11, 1897 (Note: Barnes was nominated on May 3, 1897; confirmed by the Senate on May 11; and took the oath of office on May 24.) – April 20, 1901 (1440 days; replaced)	William McKinley
5	William Miller Jenkins (1856–1941)	April 20, 1901 (Note: Jenkins was appointed on April 20, 1901, during a Senate recess, but was removed before he was formally nominated and confirmed.) – November 30, 1901 (225 days; removed) (Note: Jenkins was removed due to a corruption scandal, though he was later exonerated. Territorial Secretary William C. Grimes acted as governor until his successor arrived.)	William McKinley
6	Thompson Benton Ferguson (1857–1921)	November 30, 1901 (Note: Ferguson was appointed on November 30, 1901, during a Senate recess; nominated on December 5, 1901; and confirmed by the Senate on January 13, 1902. He took the oath of office on December 9, 1901.) – January 13, 1906 (1506 days; replaced)	Theodore Roosevelt
7	Frank Frantz (1872–1941)	January 13, 1906 (Note: Frantz was nominated on December 6, 1905, for a term beginning January 13; confirmed by the Senate on January 10, 1906; and was inaugurated on January 13, 1906.) – November 16, 1907 (673 days; lost election)	Theodore Roosevelt

=== State of Oklahoma ===
Indian Territory and Oklahoma Territory were combined and admitted to the Union as the State of Oklahoma on November 16, 1907.

The Constitution of Oklahoma calls for the election of a governor every four years, to take office on the second Monday in January after the election. Originally, governors could not succeed themselves, with no limit on total terms; a 1966 constitutional amendment allowed them to succeed themselves once. An amendment in 2010 limited them to eight years in total, retroactively applying to all living former governors. Should the office become vacant because of a death, resignation or removal of the governor, the lieutenant governor immediately succeeds to the governorship. After Jack C. Walton was impeached and removed in 1923, Lieutenant Governor Martin E. Trapp served in the office for the remainder of the term. He styled himself "Acting Governor," as the constitution only specified that the powers of the office devolved upon the lieutenant governor, hoping that he would not be prevented from running in the next election. However, the Oklahoma Supreme Court ruled in 1926 that, in the case of a vacancy in the office, the lieutenant governor becomes governor, and he was ineligible to run for a consecutive term. The governor and the lieutenant governor are not formally elected on the same ticket.

Governors of the State of Oklahoma
No.	Governor	Term in office	Party	Election	Lt. Governor (Note: Lieutenant governors represented the same party as their governor unless noted.)
1	Charles N. Haskell (1860–1933)	November 16, 1907 – January 9, 1911 (1151 days; term-limited) (Note: Under the original provisions of the 1907 constitution, governors were ineligible to succeed themselves.)	Democratic	1907	George W. Bellamy
2	Lee Cruce (1863–1933)	January 9, 1911 – January 11, 1915 (1464 days; term-limited)	Democratic	1910	J. J. McAlester
3	Robert L. Williams (1868–1948)	January 11, 1915 – January 13, 1919 (1464 days; term-limited)	Democratic	1914	Martin E. Trapp
4	James B. A. Robertson (1871–1938)	January 13, 1919 – January 8, 1923 (1457 days; term-limited)	Democratic	1918	Martin E. Trapp
5	Jack C. Walton (1881–1949)	January 8, 1923 – November 19, 1923 (316 days; impeached and removed) (Note: Walton was convicted on multiple charges of corruption, abuse of power, and for violating the state constitution by suspending habeas corpus.)	Democratic	1922	Martin E. Trapp
6	Martin E. Trapp (1877–1951)	November 19, 1923 – January 10, 1927 (1149 days; term-limited)	Democratic	Succeeded from lieutenant governor (Note: Jack C. Walton was impeached on October 23, 1923, at which point Trapp began acting as governor; per the 1926 Oklahoma Supreme Court ruling, when Walton was removed from office on November 19, Trapp became governor.)	Vacant
7	Henry S. Johnston (1867–1965)	January 10, 1927 – March 20, 1929 (801 days; impeached and removed) (Note: Johnston was convicted on a charge of general incompetence.)	Democratic	1926	William J. Holloway
8	William J. Holloway (1888–1970)	March 20, 1929 – January 12, 1931 (664 days; term-limited)	Democratic	Succeeded from lieutenant governor (Note: Henry S. Johnston was impeached on January 21, 1929, at which point Holloway began acting as governor.)	Vacant
9	William H. Murray (1869–1956)	January 12, 1931 – January 14, 1935 (1464 days; term-limited)	Democratic	1930	Robert Burns
10	E. W. Marland (1874–1941)	January 14, 1935 – January 9, 1939 (1457 days; term-limited)	Democratic	1934	James E. Berry
11	Leon C. Phillips (1890–1958)	January 9, 1939 – January 11, 1943 (1464 days; term-limited)	Democratic	1938	James E. Berry
12	Robert S. Kerr (1896–1963)	January 11, 1943 – January 13, 1947 (1464 days; term-limited)	Democratic	1942	James E. Berry
13	Roy J. Turner (1894–1973)	January 13, 1947 – January 8, 1951 (1457 days; term-limited)	Democratic	1946	James E. Berry
14	Johnston Murray (1902–1974)	January 8, 1951 – January 10, 1955 (1464 days; term-limited)	Democratic	1950	James E. Berry
15	Raymond D. Gary (1908–1993)	January 10, 1955 – January 12, 1959 (1464 days; term-limited)	Democratic	1954	Cowboy Pink Williams
16	J. Howard Edmondson (1925–1971)	January 12, 1959 – January 6, 1963 (1456 days; resigned) (Note: Edmondson resigned so that his successor would appoint him to the United States Senate.)	Democratic	1958	George Nigh
17	George Nigh (1927–2025)	January 6, 1963 – January 14, 1963 (9 days; retired) (Note: Nigh had already lost the Democratic nomination for governor when he succeeded Edmondson.)	Democratic	Succeeded from lieutenant governor	Vacant
18	Henry Bellmon (1921–2009)	January 14, 1963 – January 9, 1967 (1457 days; term-limited)	Republican	1962	Leo Winters (Note: Represented the Democratic Party)
19	Dewey F. Bartlett (1919–1979)	January 9, 1967 – January 11, 1971 (1464 days; lost election)	Republican	1966	George Nigh
20	David Hall (1930–2016)	January 11, 1971 – January 13, 1975 (1464 days; lost nomination)	Democratic	1970	George Nigh
21	David Boren (1941–2025)	January 13, 1975 – January 2, 1979 (1451 days; resigned) (Note: Boren resigned, having been elected to the United States Senate.)	Democratic	1974	George Nigh
22	George Nigh (1927–2025)	January 3, 1979 – January 12, 1987 (2932 days; term-limited) (Note: Under a 1966 amendment to the constitution, governors were ineligible to be elected more than two times in succession.)	Democratic	Succeeded from lieutenant governor	Spencer Bernard
22	George Nigh (1927–2025)	January 3, 1979 – January 12, 1987 (2932 days; term-limited)	Democratic	1978	Spencer Bernard
22	George Nigh (1927–2025)	January 3, 1979 – January 12, 1987 (2932 days; term-limited)	Democratic	1982	Spencer Bernard
23	Henry Bellmon (1921–2009)	January 12, 1987 – January 14, 1991 (1464 days; retired)	Republican	1986	Robert S. Kerr III
24	David Walters (b. 1951)	January 14, 1991 – January 9, 1995 (1457 days; retired)	Democratic	1990	Jack Mildren
25	Frank Keating (b. 1944)	January 9, 1995 – January 13, 2003 (2927 days; term-limited)	Republican	1994	Mary Fallin (Note: Represented the Republican Party)
25	Frank Keating (b. 1944)	January 9, 1995 – January 13, 2003 (2927 days; term-limited)	Republican	1998	Mary Fallin
26	Brad Henry (b. 1963)	January 13, 2003 – January 10, 2011 (2920 days; term-limited)	Democratic	2002	Mary Fallin
26	Brad Henry (b. 1963)	January 13, 2003 – January 10, 2011 (2920 days; term-limited)	Democratic	2006	Jari Askins
27	Mary Fallin (b. 1954)	January 10, 2011 – January 14, 2019 (2927 days; term-limited) (Note: Under a 2010 amendment to the constitution, governors are limited to serving eight years in total, not counting partial terms towards the limit.)	Republican	2010	Todd Lamb
27	Mary Fallin (b. 1954)	January 10, 2011 – January 14, 2019 (2927 days; term-limited)	Republican	2014	Todd Lamb
28	Kevin Stitt (b. 1972)	January 14, 2019 – Incumbent (Note: Stitt's second term began on January 9, 2023, and will expire on January 11, 2027; he is term-limited.) (in office 2870 days)	Republican	2018	Matt Pinnell
28	Kevin Stitt (b. 1972)	January 14, 2019 – Incumbent (in office 2870 days)	Republican	2022	Matt Pinnell
29	Mike Mazzei (b. 1965)	Governor-elect takes office January 11, 2027	Republican	2026	T. W. Shannon

== See also ==
- Gubernatorial lines of succession in the United States § Oklahoma
- First ladies and gentlemen of Oklahoma
- Lieutenant Governor of Oklahoma
- List of Oklahoma state legislatures

== Sources ==
- "Former Oklahoma Governors". National Governors Association.
- "Oklahoma Constitution". State Democracy Research Initiative. University of Wisconsin Law School.
- Glashan, Roy R. (1979). American Governors and Gubernatorial Elections, 1775-1978. Meckler Books. ISBN 0-7201-1511-6 – via Internet Archive.
- Kallenbach, Joseph E.; Kallenbach, Jessamine S. (1977). American State Governors, 1776-1976. Oceana Publications. ISBN 978-0-379-00665-0 – via Internet Archive.
- McMullin, Thomas A.; Walker, David (1984). Biographical Directory of American Territorial Governors. Meckler Publishing. ISBN 0-930466-11-X – via Internet Archive.
- Mullaney, Marie Marmo (1994). Biographical Directory of the Governors of the United States, 1988–1994. Greenwood Publishing Group. ISBN 0-313-28312-5 – via Internet Archive.
- Sobel, Robert; Raimo, John (1978). Biographical Directory of the Governors of the United States, 1789-1978. Vol. 3. Meckler Books. ISBN 0-930466-01-2 – via Internet Archive.
- Thorpe, Francis Newton, ed. (1909). The Federal and State Constitutions, Colonial Charters, and Other Organic Laws of the States, Territories, and Colonies Now or Heretofore Forming the United States of America. Vol. 5. United States Government Publishing Office – via Internet Archive.
