= Seminole burning =

1898 lynching near Maud, Oklahoma, US

- Location: 35°07′55″N 96°46′39″W; Near Maud, Oklahoma, US
- Date: January 8, 1898 c. 3:00 AM CST (UTC-5:00)
- Target: Lincoln McGeisey and Palmer Sampson
- Attack type: Lynching by live burning
- Deaths: 2

The Seminole burning was the lynching by live burning of two Seminole youth, Lincoln McGeisey and Palmer Sampson, near Maud, Oklahoma, on January 8, 1898.

On December 30, 1897, a woman named Mary Leard was murdered in her home by a Native American man. When her body was discovered by her husband and Maud townspeople the next day, a white mob began to form, and they combed the area to find the person guilty. They cornered, detained, kidnapped, tortured, and—in some cases—mock lynched several men over a few days, before they settled on two teenagers they thought were guilty of the crime: Lincoln McGeisey and Palmer Sampson. McGeisey and Sampson were chosen despite there being no evidence for a second killer, and the mob accused them of raping, murdering, and having sex with the dead body of Mary Leard. Although Sampson allegedly admitted guilt in the crime, both of them were likely innocent.

The mob chained the two together by the neck and brought them to a makeshift prayer site. They were surrounded by dry brush and wooden poles, and after a member of the mob lit the pile on fire, they burned alive. McGeisey's flesh sloughed off his body, and Sampson tried to struggle against the flames; both died. They were buried on Seminole land, their bodies still chained together.

Dozens of men were indicted in relation to the case. In front of judge John R. Thomas, special prosecutor Horace Speed led the prosecutions of the men involved in the lynching. Ultimately, six of them were convicted and imprisoned. It was the first successful lynching prosecution in the Southwestern United States.

== Background ==
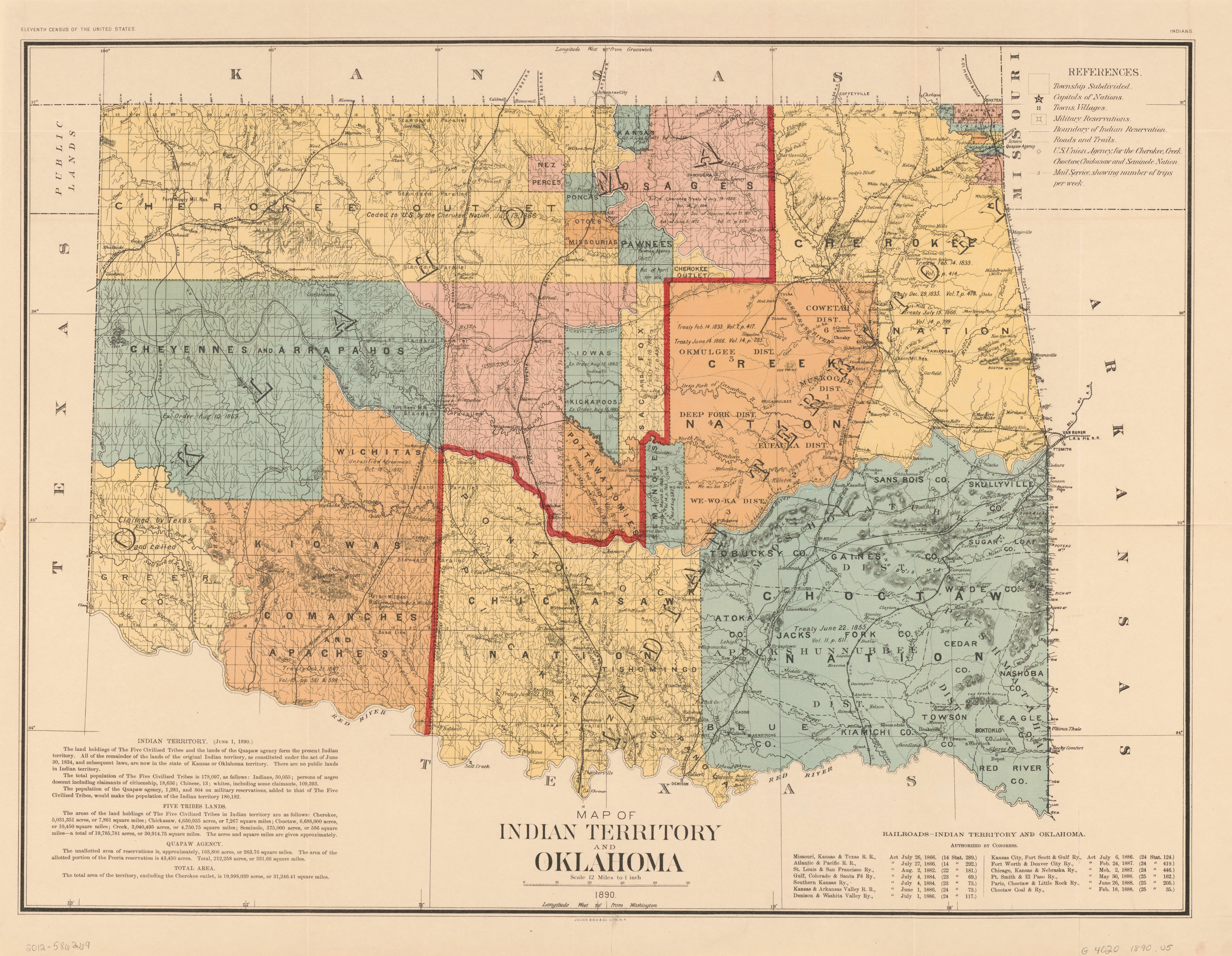
Map of the Oklahoma Territory (left) and Indian Territory (right) in the 1890s

=== Political background ===
Throughout the nineteenth century, the American government removed the Seminole people from Florida to the Indian Territory, a region that now lies in the eastern part of Oklahoma. The Five Civilized Tribes (including the Seminole) underwent the Reconstruction Treaties, which divided their land claims in the western and central parts of Oklahoma and opened it to settlement from other tribes. The Seminole people underwent social changes during this time of removal and resettlement, and transitioned into a mostly pastoralist lifestyle. In 1889, parts of this ceded land were opened to settlement by whites, and in 1890, it became organized as the Oklahoma Territory. On the Oklahoma side of its boundary with the Indian Territory sat Maud in Pottawatomie County.

In 1896, the Oklahoma and Indian Territories had at least ten lynchings altogether. In territorial history, most of those murdered in bouts of extrajudicial mob violence were black or Native Americans: For black people accused of crimes, they were frequently lynched; for Native Americans accused, they were sometimes lynched, depending on the accusation; and for white people accused, they were only infrequently lynched. In one case in Pottawatomie County in 1897, a mob attempted to lynch a man named Israel C. McGlothlin: He was hanged alive three times, but he ultimately survived.

=== Murder ===
On the evening of December 30, 1897, Mary Leard (also rendered as Mary Laird or Julia Laird) was at her home alone with her three children as her husband stayed at a friend's house. A Native American man with a distinctive scar on his cheek approached the house and left, only to return later that night. He chased Leard out of the house and tried to shoot her twice, but the gun failed. He murdered her by hitting her over the head with his gun, threw her infant daughter Cora on the floor, asked the children for money, and then fled.

Mary Leard's children left her dead body outside, and it was partially eaten by roaming pigs during the night. The next morning, the Leard children sought help, and Maud townspeople and their father returned to find her dead. Cora died from her injuries a few months later.

=== Victims ===
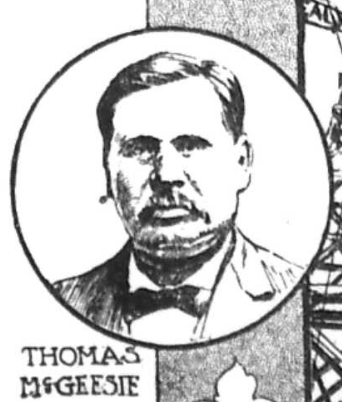
New York Herald drawing of Thomas McGeisey (here rendered as Thomas McGeesie) in 1899

Lincoln McGeisey (Note: Variously rendered as Lincoln McGeezy, Lincoln McGeesey, Lincoln McGeizy, J. Markus McGeisey, and Lincoln McGresey.) was the 18-year-old son of Seney and Thomas McGeisey. Thomas was a Seminole farmer, landowner, and public official who served as the superintendent of the Seminole Nation's public schools, and he was selected to visit Washington, D.C., in early 1898 in a Seminole delegation. He owned the land on which the Leards built their home. McGeisey had four siblings through his father: Martha, Nora, William, and James. They lived in a large, multistory house—uncharacteristic for most members of the Seminole Nation, who at the time lived in single room houses made of logs and mud—about 3.5 miles (5.6 km) west of Maud.

Palmer Sampson (Note: Sometimes spelled Palmer Samson in news accounts from the time.) was the uneducated 17-year-old son of Sukey Natuksie and Sampson Walker; he had a sister named Rhoda. (Note: His sister's last name is either Natuksie or Fixico. Sukey's last name is rendered variously as Natuksie, Sampson, and Cobuxey.) He was involved in crime, having earlier pleaded guilty to horse theft (whether he was sentenced for this crime is unknown), and he had only recently returned from the Kansas State Penitentiary for larceny. He could not understand or speak English.

== Mob ==
The general public acts in such cases [accusations of rape] on the theory that it is infinitely safer to summarily execute such criminals than run the risk of seeing them turned loose upon the community for the want of prosecution. [...] If speedy justice is not had in the courts of the country, there is a surer and swifter way, and there is no section on the American continent where the remedy will not be applied.

— Weekly Chieftan, 1898

After finding Leard's dead body, her husband and his friends looked for a man that met the description of the murderer: a Native American man with a distinctive cheek scar.

Though close acquaintances of the Leard family initially congregated and planned out their violence, this tight inner circle soon expanded, and many of its members were strangers to the Leards; they had no personal stake in the crime, and many traveled a great distance for the express purpose of lynching. The mob distorted the truth of the underlying crime: in their imagination, two men raped Leard, murdered her, assaulted Cora, left the scene, and then returned to have sex with Leard's corpse. Most members of the final mob did not understand the circumstances of the murder, including the fact that Leard had not been raped.

=== Violence ===
The mob combed through the area and arrested men who did not fit the physical description of Leard's murderer. On January 1, 1898, they arrested, tortured, and held in bondage a 19-year-old man named Billy (whose last name was either Harjo or Thlocco), attempting to extract a confession from him, but Leard's son never said he looked like his mother's killer. They arrested Thlocco again and threatened to murder him; he was released. Two other men, never identified by Leard's son as the killer, were also chained up and released. Around this time, they shot at a group of several Native American men; the men were not struck and were never arrested.

They arrested Lincoln McGeisey twice, but Leard's son testified that he did not kill Leard. They interrogated him—asking where he was on the night of the murder, to which he responded he was with family—stripped him down, and continued asking whether he murdered Leard. They strung a noose around his neck and threatened to immediately lynch him if he did not confess, but he continued to deny, so they attacked him, strung a noose around his neck again, and brought him back to the home.

They continued combing through the area in an attempt to find the killer, arresting and threatening several men. They invaded the home of John Washington, kidnapped him at gunpoint, and mock lynched him by stringing a noose around his neck and hanging him from a tree until he lost consciousness, then brought him down and brutalized him.

The mob intended to lynch Washington and McGeisey, even though Leard's husband thought McGeisey was innocent of the crime. They decided to release Washington in exchange for Palmer Sampson, a boy who also did not meet the description of the killer. McGeisey and Sampson were chained together at the neck while held in custody. Sampson allegedly admitted to the murder through a translator, even though neither Sampson nor McGeisey are likely to have committed the crime. On January 7, the plans to lynch Sampson and McGeisey were finalized with 64 accomplices present.

== Lynching ==
Stoically, the Indians went to their death. One of them, it is true, when the pain was unbearable, leaned forward and sucked the flames into his lungs. But the other, like the braves among his ancestors who had silently borne the worst tortures enemies could devise, stood erect until the flames ended his life, a dreadful punishment at the best made still more dreadful by the thought that the victims might have been innocent of the crime laid on them.

— New York Herald report, 1899 (Note: New York Herald 1898, sec. 6, p. 9.)

In the still-dark morning hours of January 8, 1898, a mob carried McGeisey and Sampson to a makeshift prayer site filled with dry brush, just south of the post office in Maud—a "tabernacle" in the local parlance. Leard had previously confessed her sins to the community at this location, and the mob wanted to "mingle their [McGeisey's and Sampson's] blood with her departed spirit".

They were shackled together by their necks to opposite sides of a tree, facing northwards, as the mob surrounded them with dry wooden poles from the site's brush arbor. According to a news account, their clothes were doused in oil. The mob offered the two a chance to pray; only McGeisey did, in his own language. One of the members of the mob, which consisted of more than two hundred people, then lit the wood on fire. Both McGeisey and Sampson were burned alive. McGeisey's muscle and skin dripped and slid off the right side of his body as he was burned. Unlike Sampson—who struggled against the heat and kicked pieces of burning wood away from his body—McGeisey did not wrangle his body away from the flames. A member of the mob took one of their bodies and impaled a skull with a stick, causing the still-boiling brains to be released. (Note: The impaler screamed in response to the brains oozing out of the skull, and members of the mob ran away in disgust.)

According to a newspaper report, their arms and legs burned away, leaving behind only unrecognizable "trunks" joined by padlocked chains. Still chained together, they were eventually recovered and buried on Seminole land.

== Immediate aftermath ==
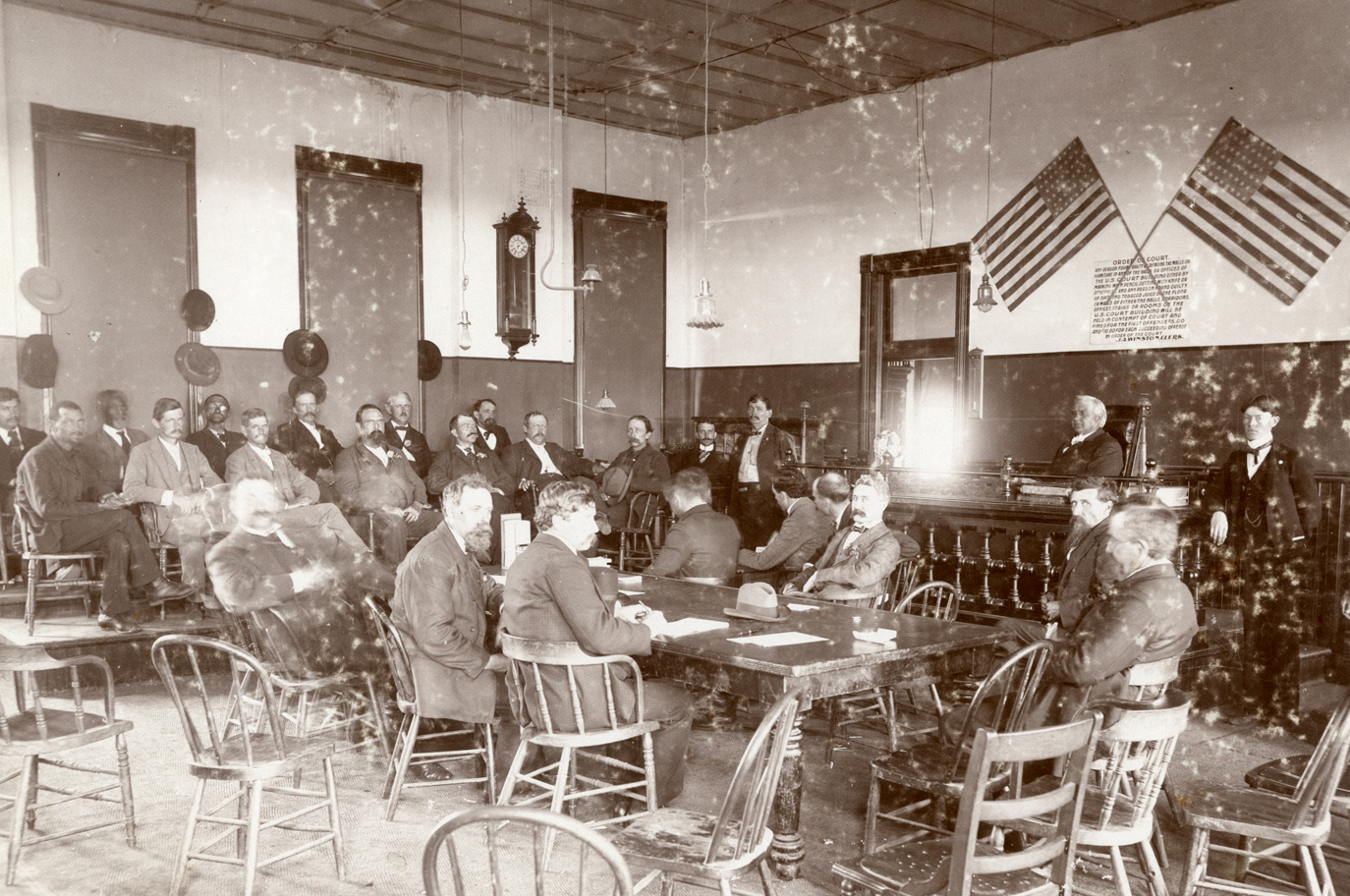
The trial of some of the members of the lynch mob (1899)

The white public of Oklahoma Territory largely supported those who lynched McGeisey and Sampson. Soon after the men were murdered, newspapers started claiming that members of the Seminole Nation were planning to target white Oklahomans in a race riot. Writers for the Weekly Oklahoma State Capital claimed on January 15, 1898—through a special bulletin—that in response to "the excesses of the armed bands of whites", Native American revenge was "imminent". This was a falsehood crafted by a communications employee in Earlsboro, Oklahoma, and officials from the Department of the Interior were unable to find any evidence of any insurrection.

=== Investigation and arrests ===
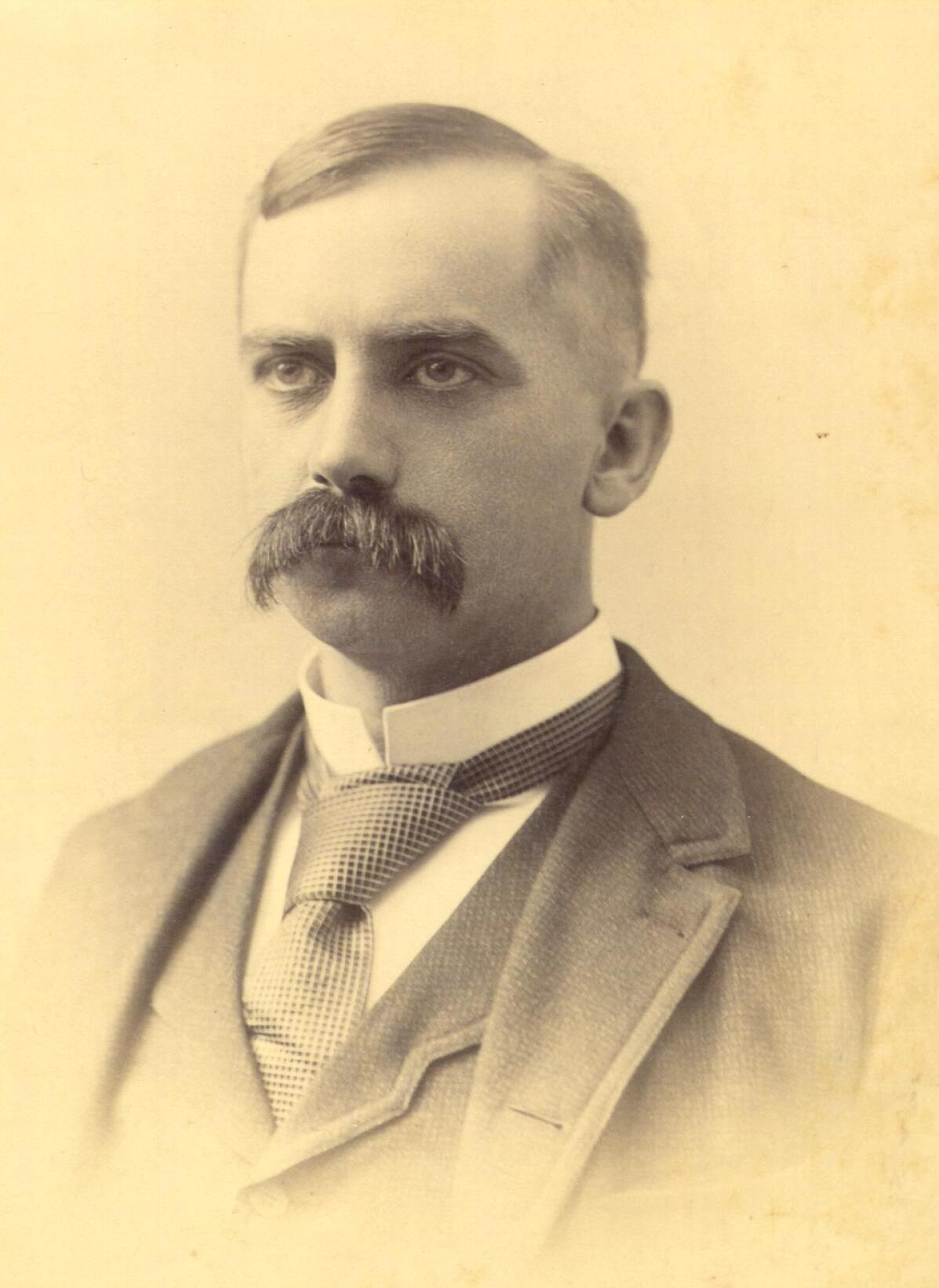
Special prosecutor Horace Speed in the 1890s

In January 1898, the federal government began investigating the lynching as a criminal conspiracy, but could not investigate it as murder since there was no applicable federal murder statute. There were complications in the investigation, however, as many witnesses, both white and Seminole, were reluctant to provide testimony, many of the Seminole witnesses did not speak English, and at least one witness was intimidated by a mob and forced to destroy his deposition.

Independently, Governor Cassius McDonald Barnes of the Oklahoma Territory offered a $1,000 reward for anyone who could secure a conviction against mob members for their role in "acts of lawlessness and barbarism". In February and March, several warrants were executed by federal investigators, but it remained difficult to find all of the members of the mob; out of around 90 people who were due to be arrested, only 67 had been located.

=== Indictments and trials ===
Horace Speed was appointed as a special prosecutor in April 1898. He successfully persuaded a grand jury to return indictments against dozens of men—45 on charges of kidnapping, which carried up to 21 years in prison and 49 on charges of arson, which carried up to 20 years in prison, albeit many of them successfully evaded capture for a time, and some found comfort in the territory of the Chickasaw Nation.

Before Judge John R. Thomas, Speed successfully prosecuted several men, some of whom requested a jury trial and some pleaded guilty. In total, six members of the mob were sentenced to prison: Deputy U.S. Marshal Nelson M. Jones (21 years), Andrew J. Mathis (10 years), Mont Ballard (10 years), Sam Pryor (pleaded guilty, 3 years), Bird Ivanhoe (pleaded guilty, 3 years), and H. Clay Roper (3 years). It was the first successful prosecution of lynching in the Southwestern United States. Jones was seen as one of the most culpable members of the mob, having recommended that the victims be tortured, made no attempt to notify his superiors about the mob, and gave directions to the mob. Mathis was found to have set fire to the brush that was heaped around the victims.

Mont Ballard served 7 years of his 10-year sentence and returned home to a celebration of hundreds in Maud who proclaimed his innocence. Nelson Jones, the last man serving prison time for his role in the lynchings, was released from USP Leavenworth on parole in November 1910.

On June 24, 1916, Mont Ballard, 53, was murdered by a friend, W.L. Harding, in a personal dispute. Harding, who shot and killed Ballard in front of a crowd in broad daylight, was convicted of murder and sentenced to life in prison.

While in prison, Andrew Mathis lost four fingers on his right hand during an accident in the woodworking department. He was released from prison in August 1906. On January 14, 1927, Andrew Mathis, now 60, was murdered in Arizona by his former housekeeper, Eva Dugan. Dugan, who was also a suspected serial killer, was convicted of first degree murder, sentenced to death, and executed by hanging on February 21, 1930.

=== Compensation ===
On July 1, 1898, after McGeisey and Sampson were exonerated of the murder, the United States Congress appropriated over $35,000 ($1,354,500 in 2025) in relation to the lynching. $5,000 was allotted to each family of the victims, $25,000 for the prosecutions for the lynchings, and $82.50 to Sampson's family and $1,113.25 to McGeisey's family for property damage. The legislation was written by Senator Matthew Quay of Pennsylvania. John Washington and George Harjo, who were both abducted and tortured prior to the lynchings, but not killed, also received compensation. John Washington was paid $500 for personal injury and $35 for loss of property. George Harjo was awarded $300 for personal injuries, as was William Thlloco. Four members of Seminole Lighthorse Police who were wrongfully detained, but not harmed, received $50 each. Another 13 Seminoles who were wrongfully detained received $25 each.

== Cultural legacy ==
One of the participants in the tortures and lynching—James Edwards Nix—wrote a memoir for his family in 1942, recounting his participation and suggesting that alcohol was the reason the murder and the lynching occurred. His great-grandchild, Kirsten Dyck, wrote in 2016 that the lynching was an instance of the ongoing genocide of indigenous peoples in the United States, and that the lynching was tantamount to a fractal massacre: individual "atrocities over large geographical areas" that contribute to genocide.

In 1996, Daniel F. Littlefield released Seminole Burning, an examination of the lynching. Historian Michael J. Pfeifer called it a "magisterial [...] case study" which "richly mined" the historical evidence of the lynching and its aftermath, and said Brundage's typology of lynch mobs was a "clear[] influence" on Littlefield's writing. He called for more examinations of the lynching of Native Americans, since there is extensive documentary evidence of their existence, and it is underrepresented in historical analyses.
