= Horace Speed =

American lawyer (1852–1924)

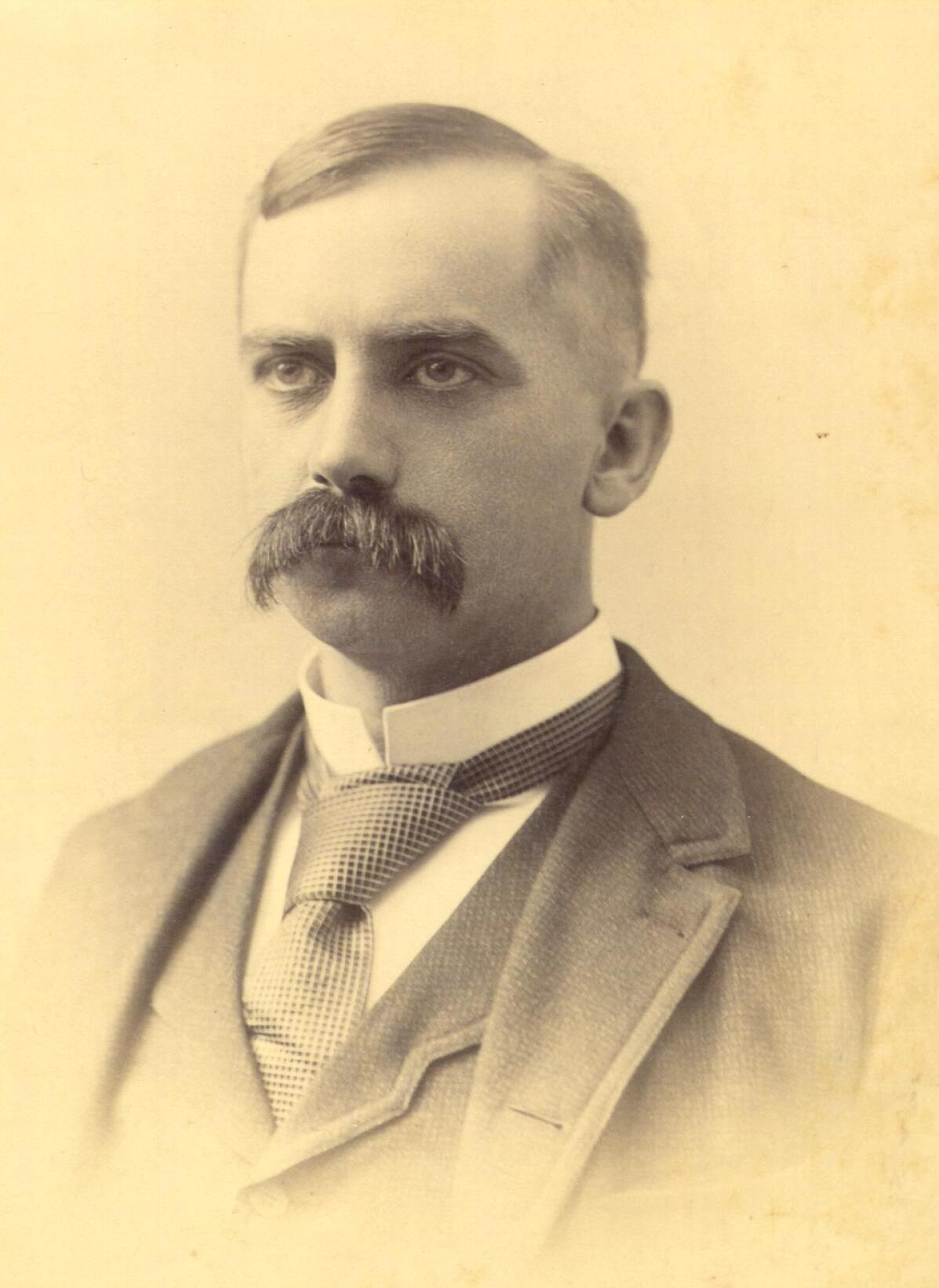
- Born: January 25, 1852; Nelson County, Kentucky
- Died: December 28, 1924 (aged 72); Tulsa, Oklahoma
- Occupation: Attorney
- Known for: First United States District Attorney for Oklahoma Territory

Horace Speed (January 25, 1852 – December 28, 1924) was an Oklahoma pioneer and the first United States District Attorney for Oklahoma Territory.

Speed was born in Nelson County, Kentucky, and was a prominent attorney in Indiana with Benjamin Harrison. In 1889, he moved to Winfield, Kansas, and following the Run of '89 he established a law practice in Guthrie, Oklahoma Territory. His experience with the Cherokee Commission led now President Benjamin Harrison to appoint him United States Attorney for the territory (1890–1894). He served again for a short time in 1900 as the last territorial US Attorney before it was divided into districts. As US Attorney he prosecuted many of the outlaws running rampant in the territory and the land fraud cases that troubled the land openings.

In 1901, following Territorial Governor William Miller Jenkins removal from office, President Theodore Roosevelt called Speed to Washington and offered him the governorship. Speed declined and Thompson Benton Ferguson was eventually appointed as a compromise.

After statehood, Speed moved to Tulsa and opened a law firm. He died there in 1924.

== Early life ==
Horace Speed was born to Thomas and Margaret (Hawkins) Speed on January 25, 1852, in Nelson County, Kentucky. He attended public school until he was 14 years old, then dropped out to work on his father's farm. When he was 17, he became a clerk for General John Parker Hawkins, assistant to the commissary general in Washington, D. C. He worked in that position for eight years, meanwhile studying law and was admitted to the bar. In 1877, he was hired by the law firm of Harrison, Haines and Miller, in Indianapolis, Indiana. The senior partner was General Benjamin Harrison, who would later be elected President of the United States. After one year at the firm, he resigned to start his own practice.

Speed continued his solo law practice in Indiana until 1889, when he moved to Winfield, Kansas. He did not remain long, because that was the year of the first Oklahoma land run, which he intended to enter. On April 22, 1889, the day of the run, he established his law office in Guthrie, Indian Territory. He had been appointed secretary for the Jerome Commission (a.k.a. Cherokee Commission), which negotiated the opening of the Cherokee Outlet with the Cherokee Nation.

== District Attorney ==
After the Oklahoma Territory was created in 1890, Speed was appointed as he first U. S. District Attorney for the Territory. One of his major targets in this position was a group of grafters who had so corrupted the Land Office that it had lost the confidence of the public. Speed was able to establish that he was incorruptible and enabled the service to win back the public's confidence.

In the so-called Cherokee Outlet cases, a group of cattlemen sought an injunction to restrain the Federal Government from removing their herds from the Cherokee Outlet. Speed, arguing for the government, resisted the move and got a court ruling establishing the right of the government to remove the cattle.

Speed was appointed as a special prosecutor on April 11, 1898, to investigate the lynching of two Seminole boys who had been accused of the rape and murder of a white woman and her baby. A mob of vigilantes had captured the boys, chained them to a tree and burned them to death. Speed's investigation identified the perpetrators and resulted in the arrest, conviction and sentencing of 45 white men for kidnapping and 45 for arson. It was the first time lynchers had been convicted in the Southwest.

In 1905, President Theodore Roosevelt offered to nominate Speed to become the sixth Governor of Oklahoma Territory. By then, Speed wanted to return to private life and declined the offer.

== Private life ==
Speed continued to live in Guthrie, where he maintained his own law office until 1913. Then he moved to Tulsa, where he was a partner with Fred R. Righter in the law firm of Speed and Righter. efn/Snodgrass wrote that he also returned to the U.S. District Attorney's office for another four-year term during this time. He lived and practiced law in Tulsa until he died at home on December 28, 1924. His funeral was held at the First Presbyterian Church in Tulsa.

On November 21, 1892, Speed had married his first wife, Jessie St. John Adams, who died May 24, 1894. On August 2, 1895, he married a second time, to Matilda McAlester who survived him. He was also survived by one son, Colonel Horace Speed Jr. of the U. S. Army, (Note: Horace, Jr. was born to Speed and Matilda.) and his sister, Miss Louise J. Speed of Louisville, Kentucky.

== Additional information ==
- Chapman, Berlin B. "How The Cherokees Acquired and Disposed of the Outlet." Chronicles of Oklahoma 16:1 March 1938 36–51. (accessed June 9, 2007)
- Doyle, Thomas H. "The Supreme Court of the Territory of Oklahoma". Chronicles of Oklahoma 13:2 June 1935 214–218. (accessed June 9, 2007)
- Foreman, Grant. "Obituary: Horace Speed." Chronicles of Oklahoma 25:1 1947 5–6. (accessed June 9, 2007)
- Peery, Dan W. "The First Two Years." Chronicles of Oklahoma 7:4 December 1929 419–457. (accessed June 9, 2007)
