= Frederick Ruple =

Swiss-American painter

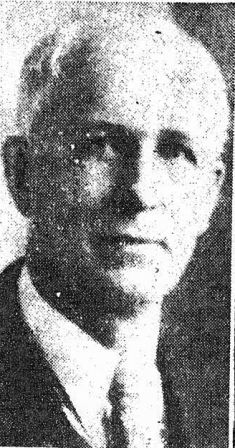
- Ruple in 1932
- Born: September 19, 1871; Switzerland
- Died: May 22, 1938 (aged 66); Tulsa, Oklahoma, U.S.
- Education: Photographer Carl Emil Gassler (1887-1891) Basel Switzerland
- Known for: Painting, portrait, murals, battle scenes, nature and Indians.
- Notable work: "The Spirit of 89" "Battle of Paris" "Tribal Camp Fire"

Frederick Ruple (September 19, 1871 – May 23, 1938) was a 20th-century Swiss-American painter, primarily of portraits. He was commissioned to paint Confederate Civil War battle scenes and murals. At times Ruple lived in Arkansas and Oklahoma where he traveled to study American Indians and early settlement in the Midwest. The Oklahoma Land Run of 1889 inspired Ruple to create his most famous painting "The Spirit of '89".

As a painter, Ruple took commission jobs that came from builders and decorators who hired him to paint murals and designs on public buildings. The work he did along these lines was among the most prominent in America.

== Early life ==
Frederick Ruple was born on September 19, 1871, in Unterhallau, a part of Hallau, in the canton of Schaffhausen, Switzerland. His parents were butcher Hermann Rupli and Barbara Neukomm.

Hermann Rupli wandered off to America without his family on May 24, 1872. Hermann and Barbara were divorced on November 12, 1874, according to Schaffhausen court records. Frederick was 3 years old at that time.

Frederick's mother relocated to Basel in 1885, when Frederick was 14 years old. Barbara Neukomm was registered in the address book of Basel in 1885 at the address Mattweg 53rd, from 1886 to 1891. She worked as a housekeeper at the address 30 Greifengasse, Basel. When Frederick Ruple was 14 he became an apprentice to an artificial limb manufacturer. In the summer of 1887, he attended the General school. When he was 16 years old he lived in Spores Gasse 16, Basel. He was in training as a photographer with Emil Gassler, at Aeschenvorstadt 42. On Gassler's poster it says in German: "Photographien in allen grossen portrait in oel"; in English this is: "Photographs in all sizes, portraits in oil".

In 1891, at age 19, Ruple immigrated with his mother to America. Around this time, his last name changed from Rupli to Ruple.

In the United States he first lived with his mother's sister in Cincinnati. During this time, an art dealer saw his drawings and ordered a copy of a photograph in colors, which was the first such piece of work sold in that country.

Ruple, while still a young man, moved to Little Rock to become the protégé of Mrs. James P. Eagle, wife of the state's governor at the time, and his work of painting portraits began. Governor Eagle, General Forest and other prominent men of the state sat for him.

== Personal life ==
After three years in America he married Almira C. King on December 25, 1894, in Belmont, Ohio. Almira was born June 1873, in West Virginia.

The 1900 U.S. Federal Census stated that Frederick (28) and Almira (26) lived in Lonoke, Arkansas; had been married for six years; and had a three-year-old son, Frederick D. Ruple. The boy was born on November 6, 1897, in New York in Cincinnati, Ohio.

The 1910 stated that Frederick and Almira had 2 sons and a daughter: Frederick D. (13 and born in Ohio); George W. (6 and born in Arkansas); and Almira C. (3 years old and born in Pennsylvania) living in their home in Ruddell township, Independence, Arkansas.

The 1920 Census stated that the couple were renting a home in Batesville, Independence, Arkansas.

An obituary in Southwest Times Record on March 7, 1925, reported that Almira (Mollie) (King) Ruple died March 5, 1925, in her home at 600 South 2 Twenty-First Street, while her family survived.

The 1930 stated that Frederick was by then married to Mildred Ruple (age 31), and that they lived with their son Robert Ruple (2) and daughter Mary Louise (six months) in Fayetteville, Arkansas. Fred and Myra also lived with them.

Frederick had his Fayetteville studio on the public square, along with a private painting school. Many of his paintings hung in private homes. Mary Louise attended Helen Dunlop Memorial School at Winslow before attending the University of Arkansas. George died from tuberculosis on September 13, 1934.

In 1936, Frederick Ruple resided at 2647 N Norfolk avenue in Tulsa, OK, and by 1938 he lived at 1505 S Columbia, Tulsa, OK, where he battled with poor health and died from a heart attack on May 23, 1938, in his house.

== Major works ==
=== The Spirit of '89 ===
The painting depicts the initial moments of the opening of Oklahoma for homesteading in 1889. The painting's central figure is Major Gordon W. Lillie (Pawnee Bill, the famous scout), who can be seen in his full scout outfit leading the run. The painting measures 9 feet by 12 feet (with frame).

Lew Wentz, a businessman from Ponca City, bought "The Spirit of '89". He presented it to Ponca City, which in turn gave it to the Oklahoma Historical Society, in whose building it now hangs.

=== Civil war paintings ===
Ruple's paintings from the US Civil War include depictions of Confederates battle scenes. His "Battle of Paris 1862" depicts a skirmish near Forrest Heights on the west side of the city, on March 11, 1862. The painting "General Nathan Bedford Forrest" depicts the Confederate war hero at the Battle at Bogler's Creek, Alabama, mounted on King Phillip with his sword drawn, surrounded by federals.

Ruple depicts the Battle of Brice's Crossroads, fought on June 10, 1864, in his painting "Edmund Winchester Rucker". The work shows General Forrest mounted on King Phillip, his sword sheathed, surrounded by his men.

=== Other major works ===
The painting "Tribal Camp Fire" hangs in the John Burroughs school building in Tulsa, OK.

While in Fayetteville he painted portraits of Dr. H. D. Wood and Major D. R. Davidson.

=== Portraits ===
Most of Ruple's fame came from celebrity portraits in Arkansas and Oklahoma, such as Confederate Generals and known politicians. His subjects included former United States Senator Robert L. Owen of Oklahoma; Supreme Court Judge U.M. Rose of Little Rock, Ark.; the father of Senator Joe Robinson; J.S. Parks and E. B. Kinsworthy, former Attorney-General of Arkansas; Mrs. Walter Ferguson, newspaper columnist; her husband, Arkansas Senator Caraway.; Judge Thomas of Muskogee, and William Busy of McAlester. William Busy of McAlester

In Batesville, Fayetteville and Fort Smith, Arkansas a number of his portraits survive.

=== Murals ===
Paul Heerwagen was an interior decorator who used Frederick Ruple to paint the four murals in the Capital Building in Little Rock, murals in the Strand Theater in Shreveport, LA, and murals of the Sahara Shrine Temple at Pine Bluff.

== Gallery ==
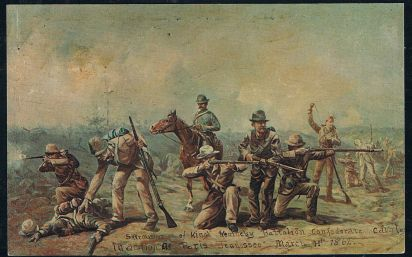
Battle of Paris, This skirmish was fought March 11, 1862, in the vicinity of Forrest Heights on the west margin of the city. Losses in killed and wounded were light on both sides. This painting, executed by Frederick Ruple, a veteran of skirmish, is owned by John P. Morrow Jr.

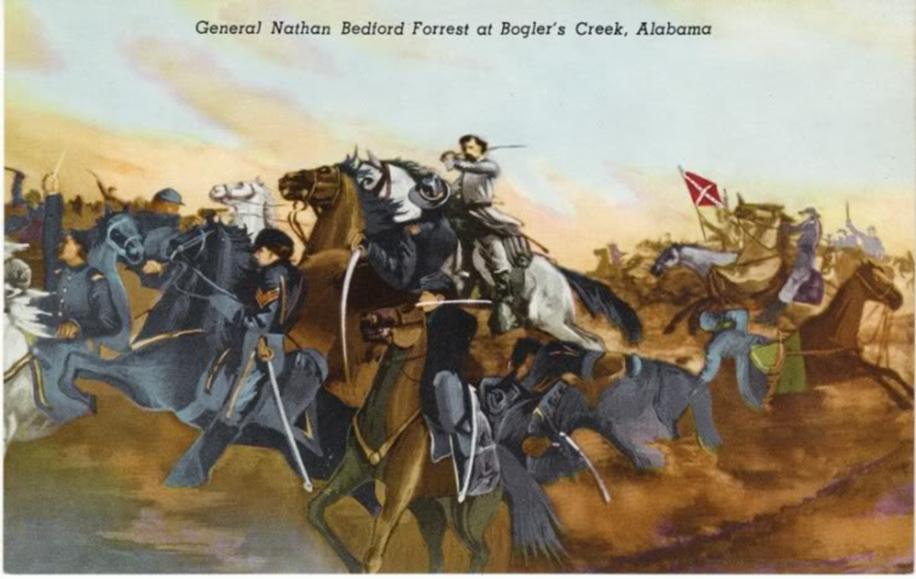
The last personal encounter of the Confederate General Nathan Bedford Forrest, April 1, 1865, at Ebecezer Church on Bogler's Creek, twenty miles North of Selma, Ala., his opposeat Capt. Jas. Taylor, 17th Indiana. Post-War railroad building took Gen. Forrest to Arkansas, where one of his comba became Forrest City. The painting was executed by Frederick Ruple at Batesville, Ark. for V.Y. Cook who served in Forrest's Cavalry.

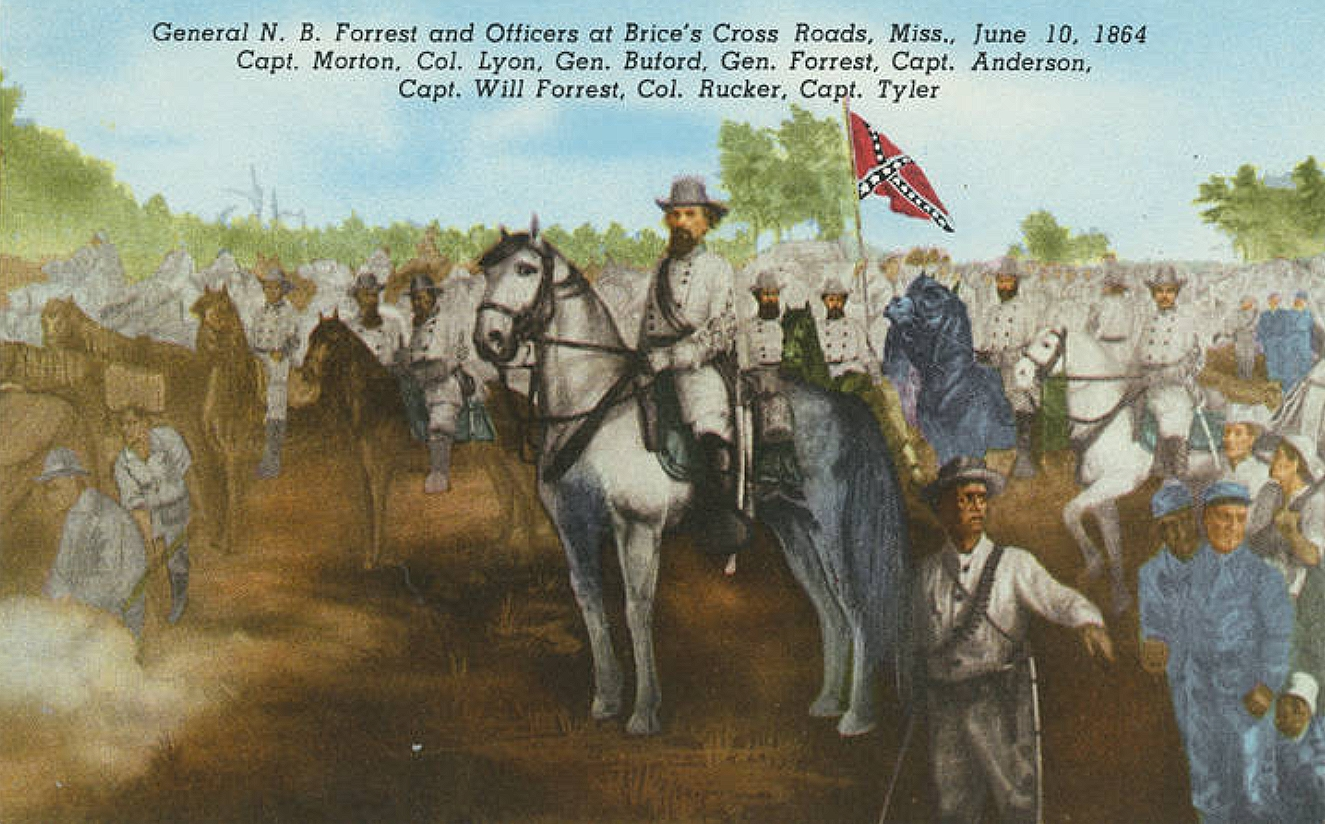
Reverse of the card reads: "This painting, executed by Frederick Ruple at Batesville, Ark., for V.Y. Cook who served in the battle under Forrest, hung for many years in the Courthouse in Memphis. Present whereabouts is unknown." Col. Rucker is, of course, Edmund Winchester Rucker, who lost an arm in the war. Fort Rucker, AL is named for him.
