= Walter Ferguson =

Walter Ferguson may refer to:

- Walter Ferguson (painter)
- Walter Ferguson (singer-songwriter)
- Walter Ferguson (politician), member of the Oklahoma Senate
- Walter Renwick Ferguson, member of the Ontario Provincial Parliament
