= Governor Barnes =

Governor Barnes may refer to:

- Cassius McDonald Barnes (1845–1925), 4th Governor of Oklahoma Territory
- Edward Barnes (British Army officer) (1776–1838), Governor of Ceylon from 1820 to 1822 (Acting) and from 1824 to 1831
- Roy Barnes (born 1948), 80th Governor of Georgia
