= Anton H. Classen =

American real estate developer

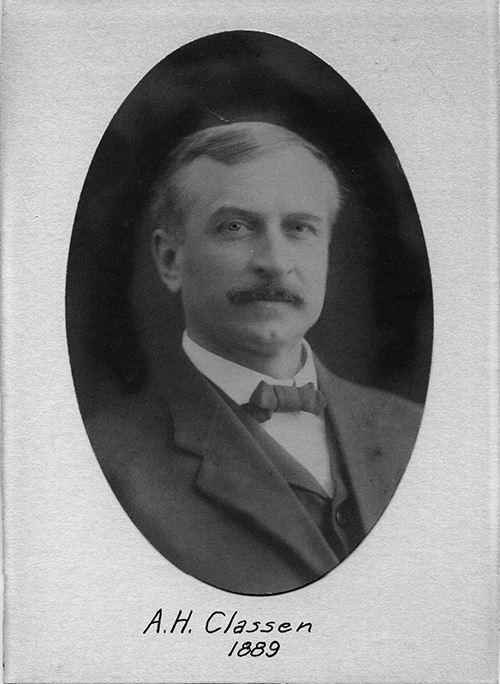
- Born: October 8, 1861; Pekin, Illinois, U.S.
- Died: December 30, 1922 (aged 61); Oklahoma City, Oklahoma, U.S.
- Education: University of Michigan Law School
- Occupation: Real estate developer
- Years active: 1890-1920
- Known for: Developer of Heritage Hills, Oklahoma City; namesake of Classen School of Advanced Studies and Northwest Classen High School; developer of Oklahoma City University
- Spouse: Ella D. Lamb (m. 1903)

Anton H. Classen was an American real estate developer active in Oklahoma City during the Oklahoma Territory era and early 20th century. The Classen School of Advanced Studies and Northwest Classen High School in Oklahoma City are both named after Classen.

== Biography ==
Anton H. Classen was born on October 8, 1861, in Pekin, Illinois, into a German American family. He attended public schools in Illinois and graduated from University of Michigan Law School in 1887. After graduation, he participated in the Land Run of 1889 originally settling in Guthrie. Believing the town had too many attorneys, he moved to Edmond, Oklahoma, where he opened a law office and edited the Edmond Sun. In 1897, President William McKinley appointed Classen receiver in the U.S. Land Office in Oklahoma City.

After moving to Oklahoma City, Classen began investing in real estate and developed Heritage Hills, Oklahoma City, in 1900. He also founded the Oklahoma Railway Company with John Wilford Shartel. He was the first president of the Oklahoma City Building and Loan Association and president of the Oklahoma City Chamber of Commerce. He helped bring Theodore Roosevelt's Rough Riders annual reunion to Oklahoma City in 1900. He helped found Epworth University (now Oklahoma City University) and married Ella D. Lamb in January 1903. He died on December 30, 1922, in Oklahoma City.
