= John Wilford Shartel =

American attorney and Oklahoma City developer

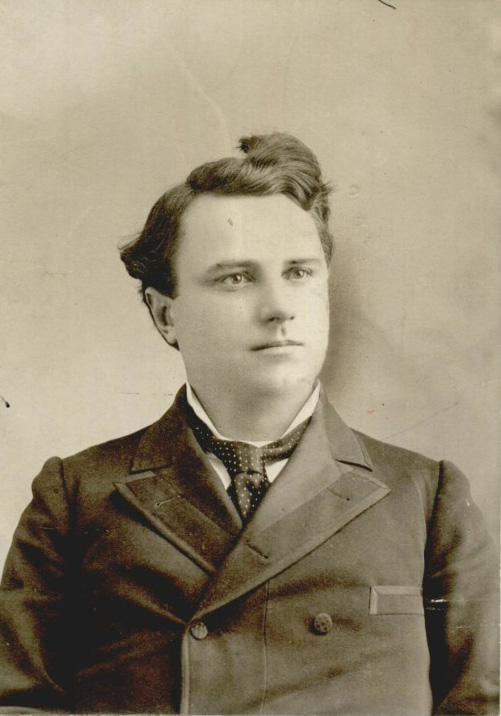
- Born: May 1, 1862; Harmonsburg, Pennsylvania, U.S.
- Died: April 13, 1926 (aged 63); Oklahoma City, Oklahoma, U.S.
- Known for: Early developer of Oklahoma City; co-founder of Oklahoma Railway Company
- Spouse: Effie Woods (m. 1888)
- Children: 2
- Relatives: Elva Shartel Ferguson (sister); Thompson Ferguson (brother-in-law); Walter Ferguson (nephew)

John Wilford Shartel was an American attorney and Oklahoma City developer active in Oklahoma Territory and the early 20th century.

== Early life, marriage, and family ==
John Wilford Shartel was born on May 1, 1862, in Harmonsburg, Pennsylvania, to David Elder Shartel and Mary Jane Wiley. After the civil war, his family moved to Kansas where Shartel attended public schools. Elva Shartel Ferguson was his sister and she married Thompson Ferguson. He started teaching at seventeen and graduated from Kansas Agricultural College in 1884. After graduation he studied law in Topeka and passed the Kansas Bar in 1886. He married Effie Woods on March 24, 1888, and they had two sons: Burke and Kent.

== Move to Oklahoma ==
In the 1890s, he settled in Guthrie, the capital of Oklahoma Territory. He was counsel for the Atchison, Topeka and Santa Fe Railway and handled land disputes after the Land Run of 1889. In 1898, he moved to Oklahoma City and was hired as counsel for Choctaw, Oklahoma and Gulf Railroad. By 1902, he joined Anton H. Classen to found the Oklahoma Railway Company and the company constructed transit lines around Oklahoma City and surrounding towns. He was vice-president 1902 to 1922, when Classen died and he succeeded him. He died on April 13, 1926, in Oklahoma City.
