= Maud, Oklahoma =

- Town
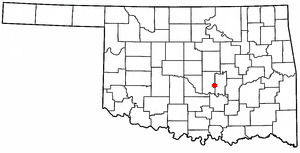
- Location of Maud, Oklahoma
- Coordinates: 35°7′55″N 96°46′42″W
- Country: United States
- State: Oklahoma
- Counties: Pottawatomie, Seminole

Government
  - Type: Aldermanic
  - Mayor: Jimmy Porterfield
  - Councilmembers: Kurtis Dustman, Lee Davis, Chad Votaw and Bobby Shatto

Area
  - Total: 1.05 sq mi (2.72 km^{2})
  - Land: 1.05 sq mi (2.72 km^{2})
  - Water: 0 sq mi (0.00 km^{2})
- Elevation: 978 ft (298 m)

Population (2020)
  - Total: 867
  - Density: 826.1/sq mi (318.97/km^{2})
- Time zone: UTC-6 (Central (CST))
  - Summer (DST): UTC-5 (CDT)
- ZIP code: 74854
- Area code: 405
- FIPS code: 40-46900
- GNIS feature ID: 2411050
- Website: maudok.gov

Maud is a city on the boundary between Pottawatomie and Seminole Counties in the U.S. state of Oklahoma. Its population was 867 by the 2020 United States census. The city was named for Maud Stearns, a sister to the wives of two men who owned the first general store.

== History ==
This community was established by 1890 on the dividing line between Oklahoma Territory and Indian Territory. In 1890, a barbed-wire fence was built along the street now called Broadway from the North Canadian River to the Canadian River to keep the Native Americans out of Oklahoma Territory. However, the fence failed to prevent the illegal sale of alcohol to residents of Indian Territory.

A post office was established on April 16, 1896.

In January 1898, a mob lynched two Seminole teenagers, Lincoln McGeisey and Palmer Sampson, by burning them alive near this same post office, in retaliation for their alleged murder of a white woman. Newspapers reported that the charred bodies remained chained to an oak tree for several days after the mob murdered them. Unlike in most lynchings, some members of the mob were actually convicted of participating in the violence. When one of these men was released from the federal penitentiary in Leavenworth in 1906, a celebratory crowd welcomed him home to Maud.

A railroad station was built by the Missouri, Kansas and Texas Railway in 1903. The first newspaper, the Maud Monitor, appeared in 1904, and lasted until about 1919. The city was formally incorporated on July 21, 1905. The 1910 census showed a population of 503.

Maud became a boom town in the early 1920s because oil was discovered nearby. The peak population was estimated at 10,000. The boom was short-lived, and the population was only 4,326 at the 1930 census.

== Geography ==
According to the United States Census Bureau, the city has a total area of 1.0 square mile (2.6 km^{2}), all land.

== Demographics ==
Historical population
Census	Pop.	Note	%±
1910	503		—
1920	637		26.6%
1930	4,326		579.1%
1940	2,036		−52.9%
1950	1,389		−31.8%
1960	1,137		−18.1%
1970	1,143		0.5%
1980	1,444		26.3%
1990	1,204		−16.6%
2000	1,136		−5.6%
2010	1,048		−7.7%
2020	867		−17.3%
U.S. Decennial Census

=== 2020 census ===
As of the 2020 census, Maud had a population of 867. The median age was 39.2 years. 24.9% of residents were under the age of 18 and 16.3% of residents were 65 years of age or older. For every 100 females there were 106.4 males, and for every 100 females age 18 and over there were 100.3 males age 18 and over.

0% of residents lived in urban areas, while 100.0% lived in rural areas.

There were 322 households in Maud, of which 34.2% had children under the age of 18 living in them. Of all households, 44.4% were married-couple households, 21.1% were households with a male householder and no spouse or partner present, and 26.1% were households with a female householder and no spouse or partner present. About 25.4% of all households were made up of individuals and 10.5% had someone living alone who was 65 years of age or older.

There were 380 housing units, of which 15.3% were vacant. Among occupied housing units, 73.0% were owner-occupied and 27.0% were renter-occupied. The homeowner vacancy rate was 2.5% and the rental vacancy rate was 5.4%.

Racial composition as of the 2020 census
Race	Percent
White	74.7%
Black or African American	1.7%
American Indian and Alaska Native	12.2%
Asian	0.1%
Native Hawaiian and Other Pacific Islander	0%
Some other race	0.9%
Two or more races	10.3%
Hispanic or Latino (of any race)	3.9%

As of the 2020 census the median income for a household in the city was $46,500, and the median income for a family was $50,000. Males had a median income of $26,944 versus $15,625 for females. 21.1% of residents live in poverty. 1.7% of the population is foreign-born.

6.1% of the population had attained a Bachelor's Degree or Higher. 71.9% of residents owned their home.

=== 2000 census ===
As of the census of 2000, there were 1,136 people, 435 households, and 301 families residing in the city. The population density was 1,174.3 inhabitants per square mile (453.4/km^{2}). There were 523 housing units at an average density of 540.6 units per square mile (208.7 units/km^{2}). The racial makeup of the city was 78.52% White, 0.18% Native American, 13.73% Native American, 0.26% Asian, 0.18% Pacific Islander, 0.26% from other races, and 6.87% from two or more races. Hispanic or Latino of any race were 2.55% of the population.

There were 435 households, out of which 36.6% had children under the age of 18 living with them, 51.3% were married couples living together, 14.7% had a female householder with no husband present, and 30.8% were non-families. 27.4% of all households were made up of individuals, and 15.4% had someone living alone who was 65 years of age or older. The average household size was 2.52 and the average family size was 3.07.

In the city, the population was spread out, with 28.1% under the age of 18, 9.0% from 18 to 24, 26.1% from 25 to 44, 19.8% from 45 to 64, and 17.0% who were 65 years of age or older. The median age was 36 years. For every 100 females, there were 85.3 males. For every 100 females age 18 and over, there were 80.4 males.

== Education ==
It is in the Maud Public Schools school district.

== Notable people ==
- Edmond Harjo, the last surviving Seminole Code Talker during World War II and a 2013 recipient of the Congressional Gold Medal, resided within or near Maud for most of his life.
- Wanda Jackson, pioneering rockabilly singer, known as the "Queen of Rockabilly," who has a street (Wanda Jackson Boulevard) named after her.
- Harold Cagle, athlete
