= William Cary Renfrow =

American politician

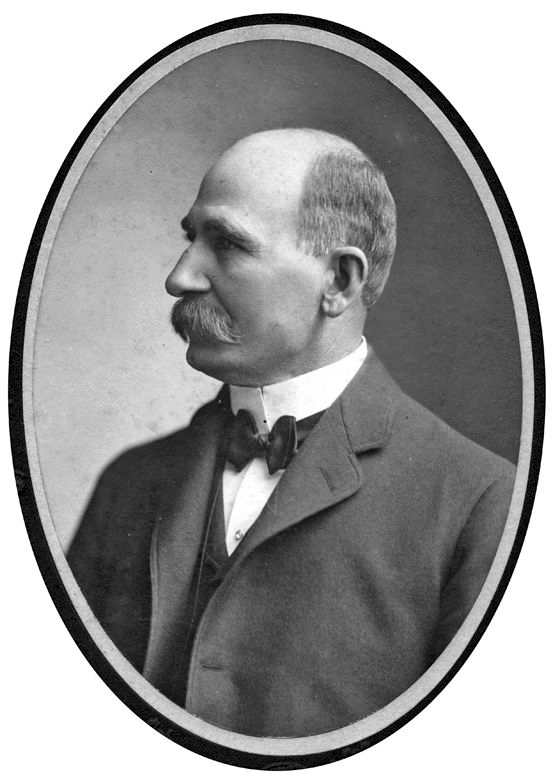

3rd Governor of Oklahoma Territory
- In office May 7, 1893 – January 31, 1897
- Appointed by: Grover Cleveland
- Preceded by: Abraham J. Seay
- Succeeded by: Cassius M. Barnes

Personal details
- Born: March 15, 1845 Smithfield, North Carolina, U.S.
- Died: May 24, 1922 (aged 77) Bentonville, Arkansas, U.S.
- Resting place: Oakland Cemetery; Russellville, Arkansas, U.S. 35°16′12.3″N 93°07′51.6″W
- Party: Democratic
- Spouse: Jennie B. York
- Occupation: businessman

Military service
- Allegiance: Confederate States
- Branch/service: Confederate Army
- Years of service: 1862–1865
- Rank: First sergeant
- Unit: Company C, 50th North Carolina Infantry Regiment
- Battles/wars: American Civil War

William Cary Renfrow (March 15, 1845 – January 31, 1922) was a native of North Carolina, United States. He enlisted in the Confederate Army at the age of 17. After being mustered out at the end of the American Civil War, he moved to Arkansas. He participated in the Land Run of 1889 in what would become Oklahoma Territory, and settled in Norman, Oklahoma, where he became a banker and an American businessman. President Grover Cleveland appointed him to serve as the third governor of Oklahoma from 1893 to 1897. After completing his term of office, he moved to Miami, Oklahoma, where he became active in the lead and zinc mining business. He later entered the oil and gas industry in Texas, which proved quite profitable. He died in Arkansas in 1922 while traveling to see his brother.

== Early life and military service ==
Renfrow was born at Smithfield, North Carolina on March 15, 1845. He attended the public schools which he left at the age of 17 years to enter the Confederate States Army in the American Civil War, and on February 25, 1862, enlisted in Company C, 50th North Carolina Infantry Regiment at Smithfield and was mustered into service at Camp Mangum on April 21, 1862, as a sergeant but subsequently was promoted to first sergeant. Robert Darius Lunsford was captain of Company C and Marshall D. Craton was the colonel of the 50th regiment at the time of his enlistment. The last muster rolls of his company available show that for July and August 1864 young Renfrow was being present.

== Business and political career ==
After his return from the war, Renfrow removed from North Carolina to the vicinity of Russellville, Arkansas where in 1865 he married Jennie B. York of Judsonia, Arkansas on October 17, 1875. He functioned as a deputy county official at Russellville in the 1880s. Upon the opening of Oklahoma for settlement in 1889, he located at Norman, Oklahoma where he was engaged in the banking business in association with T. M. Richardson of Oklahoma City. President Grover Cleveland appointed Renfrow as governor of Oklahoma Territory and on May 7, 1893, the oath of office was administered to him at Guthrie. (Note: According to an account in The Oklahoman, the Cleveland administration first offered the governorship to Leslie P. Ross, who turned down the opportunity. Ross recommended Renfrow for the position.) (Note: Historian Arrell Morgan Gibson identified Ross as a former mayor of Lawton, who previously ran against William H. Murray and Lee Cruce for the Territorial Governor position. Cruce won that election.) It has been reported that although Renfrow was relatively unknown in Oklahoma Territory, President Cleveland was set on appointing him because of his success in finance and his clean reputation. He was a Democrat, being the only governor from that party during the territorial period.

The outstanding event of his administration was the opening of the Cherokee Outlet on September 16, 1893. During his tenure, the U.S. Supreme Court transferred most of Greer County, Texas to Oklahoma in 1896, the Oklahoma Historical Society was formed and on February 21, 1895, Renfrow approved an act constituting that society as trustee for Oklahoma Territory. He was succeeded by Cassius M. Barnes, who entered office on May 24, 1897.

== Later life ==
After his retirement from office, Renfrow lived in Kansas City, Missouri for a few years, but later becoming engaged in the lead and zinc business in northeastern Oklahoma removed to Miami, Oklahoma, where he operated his mining business under the Renfrow Mining and Royalty Company and became an extensive owner of lead and zinc properties. Some two years prior to his death he embarked in the oil and gas business in the Mexia field in Texas where he spent a considerable portion of his time. His business ventures were highly successful. Renfrow died while sitting in the lobby of the Massey Hotel at Bentonville, Arkansas on January 31, 1922, while en route from Miami to Russellville on account of the illness of his brother. His is buried in the cemetery at Russellville by the side of his wife who died some years before.

== See also ==
- List of governors of Oklahoma
- List of people from North Carolina
