= Elva Shartel Ferguson =

American newspaper editor and First Lady of Oklahoma Territory

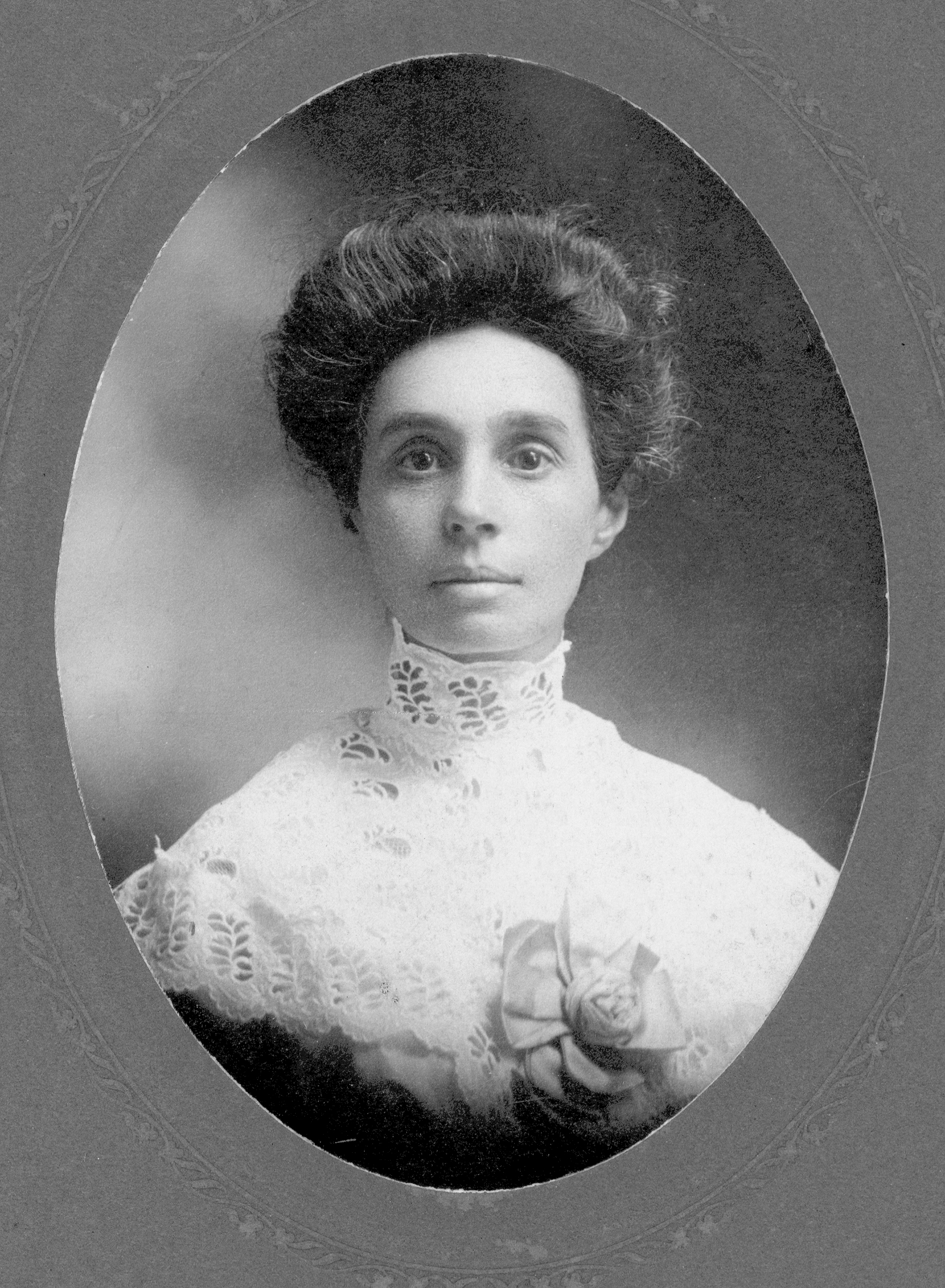

First Lady of Oklahoma
- In office November 30, 1901 – January 5, 1906
- Governor: Thompson Benton Ferguson
- Preceded by: Mary Cleaver Grimes
- Succeeded by: Matilda Evans Frantz

Personal details
- Born: Elva Shartel; April 6, 1869 Novelty, Missouri
- Died: December 18, 1947 (aged 78) Watonga, Oklahoma
- Political party: Republican
- Spouse: Thompson Benton Ferguson (m. 1885–1921)
- Children: 5, including Walter Ferguson
- Relatives: John Wilford Shartel (brother)

Elva Shartel Ferguson (April 6, 1869 – December 18, 1947) was an American newspaper editor who served as the First Lady of Oklahoma Territory between 1901 and 1906 during the tenure of her husband Thompson Benton Ferguson.

Raised the daughter of a newspaper editor in Sedan, Kansas, Ferguson married Thompson Benton Ferguson. The couple moved to Oklahoma Territory and participated in multiple land runs before founding the Watonga Republican. When her husband was appointed governor in 1901, she served as the First Lady of Oklahoma Territory until he left office in 1906. After her husband's death in 1921, she continued to be active in Republican Party politics and manage the Watonga Republican. Her writing served as the basis for Edna Ferber's novel Cimarron (1930) and she served as a technical advisor on the 1931 film of the same name.

== Early life and move to Oklahoma ==
Elva Shartel Ferguson was born Elva Shartel to David E. Shartel and Mary Jane Wiley in Novelty, Missouri, on April 6, 1869, and raised in Sedan, Kansas. Her father was the local newspaper editor until his death in 1890. In 1885, she married Thompson Benton Ferguson and the couple participated in three land runs: 1889, 1892, and 1893. In 1892, she established the Watonga Republican alongside Thompson Benton Ferguson. Elva worked as a writer and helped sell subscriptions.

== First Lady of Oklahoma Territory ==
In 1901 President Theodore Roosevelt appointed Thompson Benton Ferguson as the Governor of Oklahoma Territory, making Elva the First Lady of Oklahoma. While first lady, she lived in Guthrie and continued to write for the Watonga Republican.

== Later life, death, and family ==
After leaving office, the Fergusons returned to Watonga, Oklahoma. Her husband died in 1921. After his death she was active in Republican Party politics by chairing the state delegation to the national convention in 1924 and serving as the vice-chair of the Republican Party of Oklahoma from 1928 to 1932. She continued to work at the Watonga Republican until she retired and sold the paper in 1930. Her writing served as the basis for Edna Ferber's novel Cimarron (1930) and she served as a technical advisor on the 1931 film of the same name. In 1937 she published the book They Carried The Torch: The Story of Oklahoma's Pioneer Newspapers.

In her later life, she was active in the National League of American Pen Women and Order of the Eastern Star. In 1933 she was inducted into the Oklahoma Hall of Fame and in 1946 she was named Oklahoma Mother of the Year. She died on December 18, 1947, in Watonga.

Elva and Thompson had five children, but only two survived to adulthood: Walter Ferguson and Tom Jr.
