= Lucia Loomis =

American journalist (1887–1962)

- Born: March 29, 1887; Boggy Depot, Choctaw Nation, Indian Territory
- Died: February 27, 1962 (aged 74) near Cross City, Florida, U.S.
- Education: Hardin College; University of Oklahoma
- Occupation(s): Journalist and suffragette
- Spouse: Walter Ferguson

Lucia Loomis (also known as Lucia Loomis Ferguson and Mrs. Walter Ferguson; March 29, 1887 – February 27, 1962) was an American suffragist and journalist from the U.S. state of Oklahoma.

Loomis was born in Boggy Depot, Indian Territory. She met Walter Ferguson while attending the University of Oklahoma and they married after her graduation in 1908. The couple bought the Cherokee Republican newspaper and managed the paper with her husband. After selling the paper in 1919, she wrote for Elva Shartel Ferguson's Watonga Republican and she wrote the syndicated "A Woman's Viewpoint" column to compete with Edith Cherry Johnson's column in The Daily Oklahoman. She also wrote the "lovelorn" column in the Tulsa Tribune.

== Biography ==
Lucia Loomis was born on March 29, 1887, in Boggy Depot, Choctaw Nation, Indian Territory, (now Oklahoma) to Dr. Enos O. Loomis and Lena Arbogast. She attended school in Denison, Texas, at St. Xavier's Academy. After graduation she attended Hardin College before transferring to the University of Oklahoma. There she met Walter Ferguson and the couple married after her graduation in 1908. The couple moved to Alfalfa County and purchased the Cherokee Republican. She co-managed the paper with her husband and they would debate women's suffrage in a column, although both privately supported enfranchisement. She served as the vice president of the Oklahoma State Press Association in 1914 and 1915. She was elected chair of Alfalfa County, Oklahoma's first National American Woman Suffrage Association in 1918 and helped campaign for the passage of the 19th Amendment. During World War I, Herbert Hoover appointed her county chair of the Food Pledge Card Campaign Committee and she served on the Alfalfa County Council of Defense.

In 1919, the couple sold the paper and moved to Oklahoma City, although she continued to publish the occasional article in Elva Shartel Ferguson's Watonga Republican. In 1922 she started writing the "A Woman's Viewpoint" column for the Oklahoma News to compete with Edith Cherry Johnson's column in The Daily Oklahoman. In 1928, they moved to Tulsa and she started writing the "lovelorn" column for the Tulsa Tribune. Walter died in 1936 and Loomis became active in Tulsa philanthropy. She was inducted into the Oklahoma Hall of Fame in 1937. She died in an automobile accident on February 27, 1962, near Cross City, Florida, and was buried at Rose Hill Mausoleum in Tulsa, Oklahoma. She was posthumously inducted into the Oklahoma Journalism Hall of Fame in 1999.
