= Walter Ferguson (politician) =

American politician (1886–1936)

Member of the Oklahoma Senate from the 7th district
- In office 1917–1919
- Preceded by: A.C. Beeman
- Succeeded by: Joe Sherman

Personal details
- Born: 1886 Sedan, Kansas
- Died: 1936 (aged 49 or 50) Oklahoma City
- Party: Republican
- Spouse: Lucia Loomis
- Parents: Thompson Benton Ferguson (father); Elva Shartel Ferguson (mother)
- Relatives: John Wilford Shartel (uncle)

Walter Ferguson (1886 – 1936) was an American politician, newspaper owner, and banker who served in the Oklahoma Senate between 1917 and 1919.

Born to Thompson Benton Ferguson and Elva Shartel Ferguson in Sedan, Kansas, Ferguson accompanied his parents on multiple land runs in Oklahoma Territory before their family settled in Watonga, Oklahoma. He attended school during the height of his father's political career and later married Lucia Loomis. The couple founded a newspaper together and Ferguson was later elected to the Oklahoma Senate. He later sold his paper, Cherokee Republican, and became a banker.

== Biography ==
Walter Ferguson was born to Thompson Benton Ferguson and Elva Shartel Ferguson in Sedan, Kansas in 1886. He went to Oklahoma Territory with his parents on multiple land runs, eventually settling in Watonga, Oklahoma. When his father became Governor of Oklahoma Territory, Ferguson was sent to Wentworth Military Academy where he graduated in 1906. That year he went on to the University of Oklahoma and became a founding member and first president of Kappa Alpha Order, the school's first fraternity. In 1908, he left school and married Lucia Loomis and the couple bought the Cherokee Republican. He served in the 6th Oklahoma Legislature between 1917 and 1919 as a Republican representing the 7th district. He succeed A.C. Beeman and preceded Joe Sherman in office. In 1920 he sold the Cherokee Republican and moved to Oklahoma City and worked in advertising at a bank. In 1927 he was hired as the vice-president of the Exchange National Bank of Tulsa. He had three children: Benton, Ruth, and Tom. He died in 1936.
