= Edmond Harjo =

Seminole Code Talker from Oklahoma (1917–2014)

- Edmond Harjo at the Congressional Gold Medal ceremony, 2013
- Born: November 24, 1917; Maud, Oklahoma
- Died: March 31, 2014 (aged 96); Ada, Oklahoma
- Burial place: Seminole Nation Veterans Memorial Cemetery in Seminole, Oklahoma
- Military career
- Branch: U.S. Army
- Unit: Battery “A” 195th Field Artillery Battalion
- Known for: Seminole Code Talker
- Conflicts: Normandy landings and the Battle of the Bulge
- Awards: Good Conduct Medal, EAME service Ribbon with one Silver Star, Congressional Gold Medal
- Other work: teacher, concert pianist

Edmond Andrew Harjo (November 24, 1917 – March 31, 2014) was a Native American Seminole Code Talker during World War II. Harjo, who served with his brothers at Normandy landings and the Battle of the Bulge, was the last surviving code talker from the Seminole Nation of Oklahoma. On November 20, 2013, a group representing 33 Native American tribes were awarded the Congressional Gold Medal, the highest civilian honor bestowed by the United States Congress, for their service as code talkers. Harjo was the only surviving code talker present. He was presented with a silver duplicate of the gold medal representing his tribe.

== Early life ==
Harjo was born in Maud, Oklahoma, on November 24, 1917, on land that had been given to his mother, Yanna (née Grant) Harjo. His father was Tony Harjo. Edmond Harjo resided in the vicinity of Maud and Seminole, Oklahoma, for most of his life. He graduated from Seminole High School. Harjo obtained both his bachelor's degree and his master's degree from Oklahoma City University in Oklahoma City.

== Military service ==
Edmond Harjo and his brothers enlisted in the United States Army during World War II. Harjo served in the U.S. Army's 195th Field Artillery Battalion, serving with his brothers at Normandy in 1944 and the Battle of the Bulge in 1945. In 1944, Edmond Harjo was walking through a French orchard when he encountered another U.S. soldier singing in Muscogee language, widely known as Muscogee, under a tree. Harjo and the other soldier were overheard conversing by an army captain, who quickly put both to work at opposite ends of the army's radio signal. The story was later recounted by Speaker of the United States House of Representatives John Boehner at the Congressional Gold Medal award ceremony honoring Harjo in November 2013. Harjo's messages, which were spoken in the Seminole language, could not be easily translated by the Axis. Harjo soon trained as Seminole code talker, using his native language to foil Axis attempts to decode or decipher Allied communications during the war. He was awarded a silver Service star for his work as a code talker, as well as a European-African-Middle Eastern Campaign Medal and a Good Conduct Medal for his service during the war.

== Civilian career ==
Professionally, Harjo worked as a teacher during his career. He taught in the Maud Public Schools, the Justice Schools, and the Pickett Center school in Ada, Oklahoma, for many years. He was also a church elder at the Achena Presbyterian Church, which had been founded by his father, Tony Harjo, in 1884 in Maud, Oklahoma.

== Death ==
Edmond Harjo died from a heart attack at Mercy Hospital in Ada, Oklahoma, on March 31, 2014, at the age of 96. He was the last living Seminole code talker. Harjo never married and was survived by his nieces and nephews. His funeral was held at the Swearingen Funeral Home Chapel in Seminole, Oklahoma on April 1, 2014. He was buried at the Seminole Nation Veterans Memorial Cemetery, in Seminole, Oklahoma.
