= 50th North Carolina Infantry Regiment =

Infantry regiment of the Confederate States Army

- North Carolina State flag circa 1861
- Active: April 1862 to 26 April 1865
- Country: Confederate States of America
- Allegiance: North Carolina
- Branch: Confederate States Army
- Type: Infantry
- Engagements: New Bern; Averasborough; Bentonville

The 50th North Carolina Infantry Regiment was a volunteer infantry regiment that served in the Confederate Army during the American Civil War and was organized early in the war near Raleigh, North Carolina.

== Company Names (Local Designations) ==
- A, (Most soldiers were from Person County)
- B, (Most soldiers recruited from Robeson County)
- C, (Most soldiers were from Johnston County)
- D, (Most soldiers were from Johnston County – no specific name)
- F, "Moore Sharpshooters"
- G, "Rutherford Farmers"
- H, (Most soldiers recruited from Harnett County)
- I, "Rutherford Regulars" or "Rutherford Regulators"
- K, "Green River Rifles"

== Service ==
50th Infantry Regiment completed its organization in April 1862, at Camp Mangum, near Raleigh, North Carolina. Men of this unit were raised in the counties of Person, Robeson, Johnston, Wayne, Rutherford, Moore, and Harnett. Ordered to Virginia, it fought under General Daniel at Malvern Cliff, then returned to North Carolina. Here the 50th saw action at New Bern and Washington, transferred to J.G. Martin's Brigade, and for a time served at Wilmington. Later part of the regiment was stationed at Plymouth and part at Washington. In November 1864, it moved south and shared in the defense of Savannah, GA and skirmished along the Rivers' Bridge. Sent back to North Carolina it was placed in General Kirkland's Brigade. The unit continued the fight at Averasboro, North Carolina (15–16 March 1865) and fought its last battle at Bentonville, North Carolina (19–21 March 1865).

== Battles ==
Below is a listing of the battles of the 50th Infantry Regiment:

- Fought on 15 Jun 1862 at Richmond, VA.
- Fought on 30 Jun 1862 at Malvern Hill, VA.
- Fought on 16 Apr 1863 at Rodman's Point, Beaufort County SC.
- Fought on 25 Sep 1863 at Wilmington, NC.
- Fought on 10 Nov 1863 at New Bern, NC.
- Fought on 13 Nov 1863.
- Fought on 15 Feb 1864 at Washington, NC.
- Fought on 22 Feb 1864 at Wilmington, NC.
- Fought on 24 Mar 1864 at Cone Creek, NC.
- Fought on 15 Jul 1864 at Plymouth, NC.
- Fought on 29 Sep 1864 at Tyrrell Co, NC.
- Fought on 29 Sep 1864 at Plymouth, NC.
- Fought on 31 Oct 1864 at Plymouth, NC.
- Fought on 5 Dec 1864 at Fort Fisher, NC.
- Fought on 8 Dec 1864 at Savannah, GA.
- Fought on 9 Dec 1864 at Savannah, GA.
- Fought on 10 Dec 1864 at Savannah, GA.
- Fought on 15 Dec 1864 at Savannah, GA.
- Fought on 21 Dec 1864 at Savannah, GA.
- Fought on 22 Dec 1864 at Savannah, GA.
- Fought on 24 Dec 1864 at Savannah, GA.
- Fought on 1 Jan 1865.
- Fought on 5 Jan 1865 at Savannah, GA.
- Fought on 11 Jan 1865 at Augusta, GA.
- Fought on 15 Jan 1865 at Savannah, GA.
- Fought on 3 Feb 1865 at River's Bridge, Salkehatchie River, SC.
- Fought on 7 Feb 1865.
- Fought on 14 Feb 1865 at Charleston, SC.
- Fought on 4 Mar 1865 in Robeson County, NC.
- Fought on 8 Mar 1865 at Fayetteville, NC.
- Fought on 11 Mar 1865 at Fayetteville, NC.
- Fought on 12 Mar 1865 at Fayetteville, NC.
- Fought on 15 Mar 1865 at Averasboro, NC.
- Fought on 16 Mar 1865 at Averasboro, NC.
- Fought on 19 Mar 1865 at Bentonville, NC.
- Fought on 20 Mar 1865 at Bentonville, NC.
- Fought on 21 Mar 1865 at Bentonville, NC.
- Fought on 23 Mar 1865 at Goldsboro, NC.
- Fought on 24 Mar 1865 at Goldsboro, NC.
- Fought on 3 Apr 1865 at Richmond, VA.
- Fought on 3 Apr 1865 at Goldsboro, NC.
- Fought on 13 Apr 1865 at Raleigh, NC.

== Total strength and casualties ==
At the end, the 50th surrendered with about 250 men on 26 April 1865.

== Notable Individuals ==
- William Cary Renfrow – Governor of Oklahoma Territory

== See also ==
- List of North Carolina Confederate Civil War units
- North Carolina in the American Civil War
