= Elisabeth Enochs =

Elisabeth Randolph Enochs (née Shirley; August 15, 1895 - January 23, 1992) was an American government official and journalist. She received a 1956 Distinguished Service Award, and in 1957, she received an honor award from the Department of Health, Education, and Welfare.

== Early life and education ==
Elisabeth Randolph Shirley was born in Oklahoma Territory on August 15, 1895. She earned a graduate degree in law from George Washington University Law School in Washington, D.C.

== Career ==
Enochs worked as an instructor of French and Spanish at a girls preparatory school in Florida before becoming head of the Romance languages department at the Women's College of Alabama in Montgomery, Alabama in 1917. In 1927, she began working as a journalist for The New York Times, where she reported on international affairs.

Also in 1927, Enochs became a writer for the United States Children's Bureau, and was Director of the Bureau's International Cooperation Division from 1942 to 1951. There, she aided in the establishment of health clinics and support programs for mothers and children in Latin America.

In 1953, Enochs served as U.S. technical delegate to the Directing Council of the American International Institute for the Protection of Childhood. She also served as international service chief in the Office of the Commissioner for what would later become the Social Security Administration.

During World War II, Enochs worked as a translator for the United States Department of War.

As of 1963, Enochs was a social welfare advisor for the office of human resources and social development under the U.S. Department of State.

== Private Life and Death ==
In 1930, she married Captain John M. Enochs of the United States Navy at the American embassy in Brazil. Their wedding was reported in The New York Times. Captain Enochs died in 1932, two years after their marriage.

Enochs died of Parkinson's disease on January 23, 1992, aged 96, at Dewitt Army Hospital in Fort Belvoir, Virginia.
