= William C. Grimes (Oklahoma politician) =

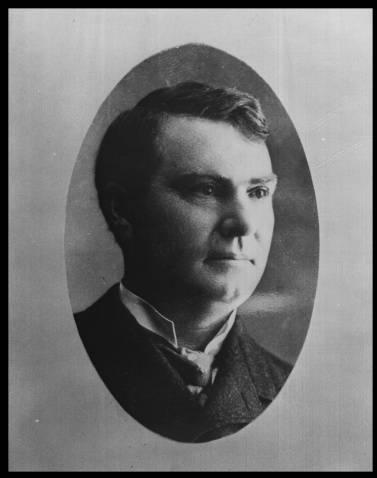

Governor of Oklahoma Territory (acting)
- In office November 30, 1901 – December 9, 1901
- Preceded by: William Miller Jenkins as Territorial Governor
- Succeeded by: Thompson Benton Ferguson as Territorial Governor

Secretary of Oklahoma Territory
- In office 1901–1906
- Preceded by: William Miller Jenkins
- Succeeded by: Charles H. Filson

United States Marshal for Oklahoma Territory
- In office August 22, 1890 – May 26, 1893
- Preceded by: Warren S. Lurty
- Succeeded by: Evett Dumas Nix

Personal details
- Born: November 6, 1857 New Lexington, Ohio, US
- Died: April 8, 1931 (aged 73) Santa Monica, California, US
- Party: Republican
- Profession: Businessman; Farmer

William C. Grimes (November 6, 1857 – April 8, 1931) was an American politician and businessman who had a major influence on Oklahoma politics. He most notably served as acting governor of Oklahoma Territory from November 30, 1901, to December 9, 1901. For many years, he served as chair of the Territorial Republican Committee. He also served as the territory's member of the Republican National Committee.

== Early life ==
Grimes was born near New Lexington, Ohio, on November 6, 1857, to George Washington Grimes. At the age of twenty, he moved to Nebraska where he became a newspaperman and later sheriff of Johnson County. He traveled south to participate in the Land Run of 1889 into the Unassigned Lands. He claimed land near Kingfisher, Oklahoma, and established a farm. He went into real estate, enlarged his farm, built business blocks and residential areas in town, and helped to establish Kingfisher College (active from 1895 to 1922). He also became active in Republican politics.

== Political career ==
Grimes was appointed U.S. marshal for Oklahoma Territory in 1890. During his career as marshal, which lasted until 1893, he established a sound mechanism for the enforcement of federal law.

Grimes was turned out of office by the administration of U.S. President Grover Cleveland. He continued to work in business and farming in Kingfisher. After the Republicans returned to national office, he was reinstalled in federal service. On May 12, 1901, he became territorial secretary under Governor of Oklahoma Territory William Miller Jenkins.

In 1901, William M. Jenkins was not reappointed Governor of Oklahoma Territory due to a major scandal over a state contract. Grimes became Acting Governor of Oklahoma Territory from November 30, 1901, to December 9, 1901. Although Grimes was accused of involvement in the suspect transaction, he continued to serve in the administration of Thompson Benton Ferguson until January 1906.

== Later years ==
After serving in the Ferguson's administration, Grimes moved to Oregon and later to California. He died in Santa Monica, California, on April 8, 1931.
