= William Miller Jenkins =

American lawyer and politician (1856–1941)

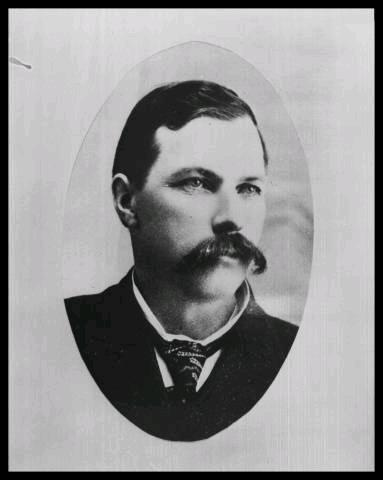

5th Governor of Oklahoma Territory
- In office April 15, 1901 – November 30, 1901
- Appointed by: William McKinley
- Preceded by: Cassius McDonald Barnes
- Succeeded by: William C. Grimes as Acting Territorial Governor ^{^{1}}

Personal details
- Born: April 25, 1856 Alliance, Ohio, U.S.
- Died: October 19, 1941 (aged 85) Sapulpa, Oklahoma, U.S.
- Resting place: South Heights Cemetery; Sapulpa, Oklahoma, U.S.
- Party: Republican
- Spouse: Delphina White (m. 1878)
- Profession: Politician; lawyer
- ^1William C. Grimes served as Acting Governor until President Roosevelt appointed Thompson Benton Ferguson to the Governorship

William Miller Jenkins (April 25, 1856 - October 19, 1941) was an American lawyer and Republican politician. He was appointed by President William McKinley in 1901 as the fifth governor of Oklahoma Territory. However, he had only served for six months when President Theodore Roosevelt removed him from office, after receiving complaints of political malfeasance. Although Jenkins was exonerated by subsequent investigations, his removal could not be undone, forcing his early retirement.

== Early life ==
The son of Henry J. and Lydia (Miller) Jenkins, William Miller Jenkins was born at Alliance, Ohio, on April 25, 1858. He attended public schools and then Mt. Union College at Alliance. He taught school in Stark County from 1876 until 1878. On December 21, 1878, Jenkins married Delphina White of Dublin, Indiana.

Jenkins and his wife removed to Shelby County, Iowa, in 1880, where he was admitted to the bar in 1883. (Note: Editor's note:This information conflicts with another source, which stated that Jenkins moved from Ohio to Shelby County, Louisiana, where he was admitted to the bar in 1893. The second statement is probably incorrect because, 1.political subdivisions in Louisiana are always named as parishes, and 2. there is no parish named Shelby.) In 1884, he relocated to Arkansas City, Kansas, where he opened a private law practice. In 1888, he served as a delegate to the Republican National Convention, where he was the first to cast a vote for William McKinley, who was running for the party's presidential nomination.

== Governorship ==
When the Cherokee Outlet was opened to settlement on September 16, 1893, causing a land-rush, Jenkins succeeded in securing a homestead in Kay County, where he practiced law until he entered government service. When President William McKinley appointed Cassius McDonald Barnes as Governor of Oklahoma Territory, he also appointed Jenkins to serve as the Territory's Secretary. Jenkins assumed that position in June 1897, and would serve for four years until President McKinley elevated him as Territorial Governor, effective May 13, 1901.

In August 1901, a lottery was held to open the Comanche-Kiowa-Apache and the Wichita-Caddo Indian reservations for settlement. The governor was accused of collaborating with certain Interior Department officials in naming other officials to government positions in the counties that were formed from the two reservations.

Questions of Governor Jenkins's fidelity arose following the renewal of contracts with the Oklahoma Sanitarium Company for the care of the insane in the Territory. Following the assassination of President McKinley on September 14, 1901, those questions developed into an outright opposition. Newly elevated President Theodore Roosevelt immediately received demands to remove Governor Jenkins from office. The Interior Department also examined the situation, and although the agency found no irregularities. Without affording the Governor an opportunity to defend himself, President Roosevelt summarily removed Jenkins from office on November 30, 1901. Territorial Secretary William C. Grimes became acting Governor until President Roosevelt appointed Thompson Benton Ferguson to the Governorship on December 9, 1901.

The Territorial Legislature also investigated the claims against Jenkins in 1903-5 and exonerated him. Territorial Governor Ferguson would later report to the Secretary of the Interior Jenkins had "suffered a great injustice."

== Late life and death ==
Jenkins returned to his farm in Kay County, then lived for a few years in Guthrie, Oklahoma. Subsequent to his retirement, Governor Jenkins spent a few years in Utah. (Note: The Digital Prairie source reports that Jenkins spent this time in California.) Upon returning to Oklahoma, he settled in Sapulpa, Oklahoma. In 1920, he was elected Court Clerk of Creek County, Oklahoma. He died at Sapulpa on October 19, 1941, and was buried in the South Heights Cemetery there.

== Notes ==
Political offices
Preceded by Cassius McDonald Barnes	Governor of Oklahoma Territory; 1901–1901	Succeeded by William C. Grimes; Acting Territorial Governor
