= Cassius McDonald Barnes =

American lawyer

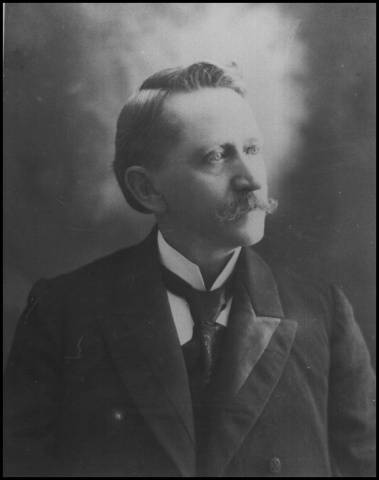

4th Governor of Oklahoma Territory
- In office May 24, 1897 – April 15, 1901
- Appointed by: William McKinley
- Preceded by: William Cary Renfrow
- Succeeded by: William Miller Jenkins

Personal details
- Born: August 25, 1845 Livingston County, New York, U.S.
- Died: February 18, 1925 (aged 79) Albuquerque, New Mexico
- Resting place: Summit View Cemetery in Guthrie, Oklahoma
- Party: Republican
- Spouses: Elizabeth Mary Bartlett (died 1908); Rebecca Cagle Forney
- Profession: Lawyer; soldier; politician

Cassius McDonald Barnes (August 25, 1845 – February 18, 1925) was a soldier in the Union Army in the American Civil War and a lawyer and Republican politician who served as the fourth governor of Oklahoma Territory.

== Biography ==
The son of Henry Hogan and Semantha Barnes, Cassius McDonald Barnes was born in Livingston County in western New York. When he was a young boy the family moved to Michigan. He attended both public schools and the Wesleyan Church Seminary in Albion, Michigan.

In 1861, at the age of sixteen, Barnes joined the Union Army as a volunteer soldier. His experience in telegraphy earned him a position in the Military Telegraph and Engineering Corps of the Union army. He served for the duration of the war and spent a portion of his enlistment as the secretary to Brigadier General Nathaniel Lyon. Barnes left the army at the age of twenty and moved to the capital city of Little Rock, Arkansas, where on June 6, 1868, he wed the former Elizabeth Mary Bartlett of North Adams, Massachusetts. His second marriage was to a divorcee, Rebecca Cagle Forney, in Chicago in 1910.

== Career ==
In 1876, Barnes, a Republican, moved to Fort Smith, Arkansas, to accept the position as Chief Deputy United States Marshal over the United States District Court for the Western District of Arkansas under Judge Isaac C. Parker. who was appointed the previous year by U.S. President Ulysses S. Grant as the federal judge.

Barnes gained a friendship with the powerful Clayton family, most notably former Governor of Arkansas and (then) U.S. Senator Powell Clayton. Through his friendship with Clayton, Barnes was appointed, by President Benjamin Harrison, as the Receiver of the United States Land Office at Guthrie, Oklahoma, in 1890 with the opening of Oklahoma Territory. He held that position for four years until the return of President Grover Cleveland.

During his tenure as receiver, Barnes studied law and passed the bar exam in 1893. He served as a member of the 3rd and 4th sessions of the Oklahoma Territorial Legislature from 1895 to 1897. During the 3rd session, he was Speaker of the body.

When President William McKinley, a Republican, took office in 1897, he appointed Barnes to replace the outgoing Democrat William Cary Renfrow as governor of Oklahoma Territory. Barnes formally took the oath of office on May 24, 1897. During his four-year term, Barnes defeated the attempts of the 6th Legislature to create numerous additional territorial institutions justified by the growing idea for the formation of the State of Oklahoma. Barnes promptly vetoed this legislation. His term in office ended on April 15, 1901, when William Miller Jenkins took the oath of office as his successor.

Governor Barnes continued to live in Guthrie, at which he served as the president of the Logan County Bank. He was elected to and served as mayor of Guthrie in from 1903 to 1905 and again in from 1907 to 1909. During his second term as mayor of Guthrie his wife, Elizabeth, died on May 27, 1908. He and second wife, Rebecca, relocated to Leavenworth, Kansas, where she served as an instructor in a girls seminary and became a postal telegraph operator there.

== Death and legacy ==
In his later years as his health began to fail, he relocated again, this time to New Mexico. He died at Albuquerque. His body was returned to Guthrie and interred at the Summit View Cemetery. Barnes was a member of the Episcopal Church, serving as a senior warden of the Guthrie church for many years. He was an active affiliate of both the Scottish and York rites of the Masonic fraternity.

Political offices
Preceded by William Cary Renfrow	Governor of Oklahoma Territory; 1897–1901	Succeeded by William Miller Jenkins
