= Thompson Benton Ferguson =

American politician

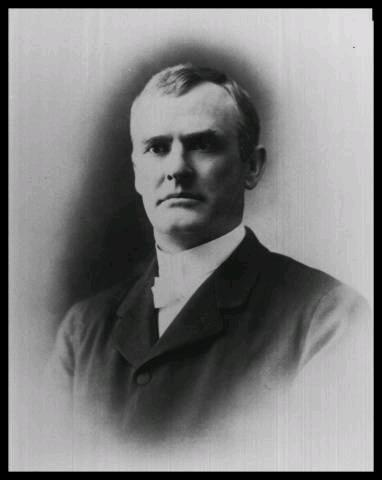

Governor of Oklahoma Territory
- In office November 30, 1901 – January 5, 1906
- Preceded by: William C. Grimes (acting)
- Succeeded by: Frank Frantz

Personal details
- Born: March 17, 1857 Polk County, Iowa, US
- Died: February 14, 1921 (aged 63) Oklahoma City, US
- Spouse: Elva Shartel Ferguson
- Children: 5, including Walter Ferguson
- Relatives: John Wilford Shartel (brother-in-law)

Thompson Benton Ferguson (March 17, 1857 – February 14, 1921) was the sixth governor of Oklahoma Territory.

== Early life ==
Ferguson was born on March 17, 1857, near Des Moines, Iowa. The following year, he moved to Emporia, Kansas, with his parents. His mother died in 1860, and his father enlisted in the Union Army at the beginning of the American Civil War. He was raised by his older sister and educated in public schools. He graduated from the Kansas State Normal School (now Emporia State University) at Emporia in 1884, financing his education through teaching. After finishing college, he was ordained as a Methodist minister and after a short time moved to Chautauqua County, Kansas. There, Ferguson taught school for nine years and married Elva Shartel Ferguson on June 9, 1885, in Sedan, Kansas. Shartel was the daughter of the local newspaper owner and when her father died in 1890, Ferguson took over the paper. Elva and Thompson had five children, but only two survived to adulthood: Walter Ferguson and Tom Jr.

== Career ==
In 1889, Ferguson joined the Oklahoma Land Run and staked a claim near Oklahoma City which he later sold and returned to Sedan, Kansas, where he purchased the Sedan Republican and edited it for two years. In October 1892, he moved to Watonga, Oklahoma Territory and established the Watonga Republican newspaper which he continued to publish until his death. He was appointed postmaster of Watonga in 1897.

President Theodore Roosevelt appointed Ferguson as the sixth Governor of Oklahoma Territory (anecdotally, when Roosevelt offered Ferguson the position via telegram, Ferguson's wife Elva accepted on his behalf without consulting him) and he assumed the office on November 30, 1901. He served until January 5, 1906. Upon retirement, he returned to his residence in Watonga. He made two notable attempts to return to his public service. He was a candidate for U.S. Representative from Oklahoma in 1907 and the Republican candidate for Governor of Oklahoma in 1910.

== Death ==
Ferguson died on February 14, 1921, in Oklahoma City, Oklahoma. After a formal tribute in the Chamber of the House of Representatives, presided over by then-Governor James B. A. Robertson, his remains were returned to Watonga and were interred at Watonga City Cemetery.

Political offices
Preceded by William C. Grimes; Acting Territorial Governor	Governor of Oklahoma Territory; Under President Theodore Roosevelt; 1901 - 1906	Succeeded by Frank Frantz
