= Oklahoma Territory =

Organized incorporated territory of the United States from 1890 to 1907

Coordinates: 35.4°N 97°W

Territory of Oklahoma
- Organized incorporated territory of the United States
- 1890–1907
- The Oklahoma Territory, including the Oklahoma panhandle, shown here together with Indian Territory, Arizona Territory and New Mexico Territory as the last four territories to gain statehood in the contiguous U.S.
- Capital: Guthrie
  - Type: Organized incorporated territory
- History
  - Organic act: 2 May 1890
  - statehood: 16 November 1907
Preceded by	Succeeded by
Indian Territory; Oklahoma panhandle	Oklahoma

The Territory of Oklahoma was an organized incorporated territory of the United States that existed from May 2, 1890, until November 16, 1907, when it was joined with the Indian Territory under a new constitution and admitted to the Union as the state of Oklahoma.

The 1890 Oklahoma Organic Act organized the western half of Indian Territory and a strip of country north of Texas known as No Man's Land (now the Oklahoma panhandle) into Oklahoma Territory. Native American reservations in the new territory were then opened to settlement in a series of land runs in 1890, 1891, and 1893.

Seven counties were defined upon the creation of the territory. They were originally designated by number and eventually became Logan, Cleveland, Oklahoma, Canadian, Kingfisher, Payne, and Beaver counties. The Land Run of 1893 led to the addition of Kay, Grant, Woods, Garfield, Noble, and Pawnee counties. In 1896, the Oklahoma Territory acquired Greer County, Texas, when the Supreme Court resolved the boundary case United States v. State of Texas in favor of the federal government. Today, this land in the southwest corner of the state is split into Greer, Jackson, Harmon, and part of Beckham counties.

== History ==
=== Organization ===
Oklahoma Territory began with the Indian Intercourse Act of 1834 when the United States Congress set aside land for Native Americans. At the time, the land was unorganized territory that consisted of the federal land "west of the Mississippi and not within the states of Missouri and Louisiana, or the territory of Arkansas..." By 1856, the territory had been reduced to approximately the modern-day borders of the state of Oklahoma, except for the Oklahoma panhandle and Old Greer County. These lands became known as Indian Territory, as they had been granted to certain Indian nations under the Indian Removal Act, in exchange for their historic territories east of the Mississippi River.

Until this point, Native Americans had exclusively used the land. In 1866, after the American Civil War, the federal government required new treaties with the tribes that had supported the Confederacy and forced them into land and other concessions. As a result of the Reconstruction Treaties, The Five Civilized Tribes were required to emancipate their slaves and offer them full citizenship in the tribes if they wanted to stay in the Nations. This forced many of the tribes in Indian Territory into making concessions.

U.S. officials forced the cession of some 2,000,000 acres (8,100 km^{2}) of land in the center of the Indian Nation Territory. Elias C. Boudinot, a railroad lobbyist, wrote an article that was published in the Chicago Times on February 17, 1879, that popularized the term Unassigned Lands to refer to this tract. Soon the popular press began referring to the people agitating for its settlement as Boomers. To prevent settlement of the land by European-Americans, President Rutherford B. Hayes issued a proclamation forbidding unlawful entry into Indian Territory in April 1879.

=== David Payne and the Boomers ===
The gravestone of David L. Payne

Despite federal obstruction, popular demands for the land did not end. Captain David L. Payne was one of the main supporters of the opening of Oklahoma to White settlement. Payne traveled to Kansas, where he founded the Boomer "Colonial Association". Payne's organization of 10,000 members hoped to establish a white colony in the Unassigned Lands. The formation of the group prompted President Hayes to issue a proclamation ordering Payne not to enter Indian Territory on February 12, 1880.

In response, Payne and his group traveled to Camp Alice in the Unassigned Lands, east of Oklahoma City. There, they made plans for a city, which they named "Ewing". The Fourth Cavalry arrested them and escorted them back to Kansas. Payne was furious, as the Posse Comitatus Act prohibited the military from interfering in civil matters. The federal government freed Payne and his party, effectively denying them access to the courts.

Anxious to prove his case in court, Payne and a larger group returned to Ewing in July. The Army again arrested the party and escorted them back to Kansas. Again they were freed, but this time the federal government charged Payne with trespassing under the Indian Intercourse Act; he went to trial in Fort Smith, Arkansas. Judge Isaac C. Parker ruled against Payne and fined him the maximum amount of $1,000. Since Payne had no money and no property, the government could not collect the fine. The ruling settled nothing on the question of the public domain lands, and Payne continued his activities.

Payne tried a third time to enter the Unassigned Lands. In December, Payne and his group moved along the northern border of Indian Territory. They were followed by a unit of cavalry under the command of Colonel J. J. Copinger. Copinger warned Payne that if he crossed the border that they would be "forcibly resisted". As the number of Boomers grew as people joined Payne, they sent a messenger to President Hayes asking permission to enter Indian Territory. After weeks of no response, Payne led his followers to the Unassigned Lands. Once again, they were arrested and Payne was sent back to Fort Smith. He was found guilty and sentenced to pay a $1,000 fine. Upon his release, he returned to Kansas, where he spent the next four years trying to open Oklahoma.

During Payne's last venture, this time into the Cherokee Outlet in 1884, the Army again arrested him. They took him several hundred miles under severe physical circumstances over a tortuous route to Ft. Smith. The public was outraged about his treatment by the military, and the U.S. government decided to try his case. Payne was turned over to the United States district court at Topeka, Kansas. He was indicted for the crime of bringing whiskey into Indian Territory, a federal offense. In the fall term, Judge Cassius G. Foster quashed the indictments and ruled that settling on the Unassigned Lands was not a criminal offense. The Boomers celebrated, but the federal government refused to accept the decision.

Payne immediately planned another expedition, but he did not lead it. On November 28, 1884, in Wellington, Kansas, the morning after a late-night address to the Boomers, he collapsed and died.

=== William Couch and the opening ===
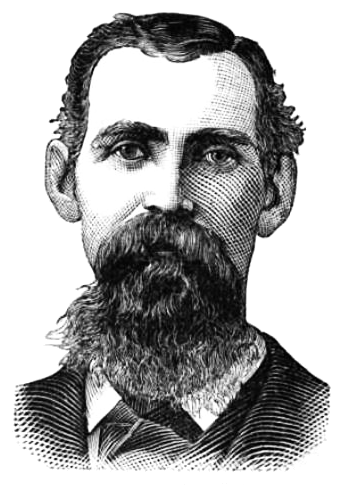
Captain W.L. Couch, 1888

After Payne's death, his associate, William L. Couch, assumed the leadership role. Couch moved the Boomers into Indian Territory and founded Camp Stillwater on December 12, 1884. President Chester Arthur sent a small detachment of troops to escort Couch out of the territory. When the soldiers arrived, 200 armed men met them and refused to move. After 600 troops arrived as reinforcements, the officers gave the Boomers the choice of leaving within 48 hours or being apprehended. After the Boomers refused to leave, the commanders moved their troops across the Kansas border and cut off Couch's supply lines. Soon their food was gone, and Couch and the other Boomers were escorted back to Kansas.

In response to Couch's claims that the federal government was discriminating against them, on March 3, 1885, Congress approved the Indian Appropriations Act of 1885. This act authorized negotiations for the cession of unoccupied lands belonging to the Creek, the Seminole, and the Cherokee. Couch stopped being a colonist and became a lobbyist.

Couch spent four years in Washington, D.C., trying to convince Congress to open the Oklahoma lands. Many Indians from the Five Civilized Tribes lobbied against Couch's actions. In January 1889, Pleasant Porter led a group of Muscogee (Creek) who offered to sell their unoccupied lands. Within weeks, they sold their "Unassigned Lands" to the United States. These lands embraced less than 3,000,000 acres (12,000 km^{2}) in the heart of Indian Territory.

On March 2, 1889, Congress passed an amendment to the Indian Appropriations Act of 1871, which provided for the creation of homestead settlements in the unassigned lands, to be known as Oklahoma Territory. President Benjamin Harrison announced that the Oklahoma lands would be opened on April 22 via land run.

=== Land Run and the Sooners ===
The Land Run of 1889, the first land run in the territory's history, opened Oklahoma Territory to settlement on April 22, 1889. Over 50,000 people entered the lands on the first day, among them thousands of freedmen and descendants of slaves. Couch and his Boomers, now numbering approximately 14,000, also entered the race. Those who entered Oklahoma before the official start of the race were called Sooners. The term referred to the "sooner clause" in the Indian Appropriations Act of 1889, which states that anyone who violated the official start would be denied a claim to the land.

When the run began at noon, men on thousands of horses, wagons, buggies, carts, and vehicles rushed across to Oklahoma. The law-abiders fought with the Sooners on several instances. A legal pioneer shot and wounded William Couch, a Sooner. He died on April 21, 1890, as a result of his wounds.

When the race was over, many disappointed pioneers were forced to leave the area without any claim. Of the 14,000 Boomers, only 1,000 had made claims. Tent cities grew overnight at Oklahoma City, Kingfisher, El Reno, Norman, Guthrie, and Stillwater, which were the first of the large settlements. Many lawsuits resulted because more than one person claimed a particular piece of land. Often this involved trying to determine which party was a legal claimant. A portion of the cases even went as far as the U.S. Supreme Court.

=== Early territorial period ===
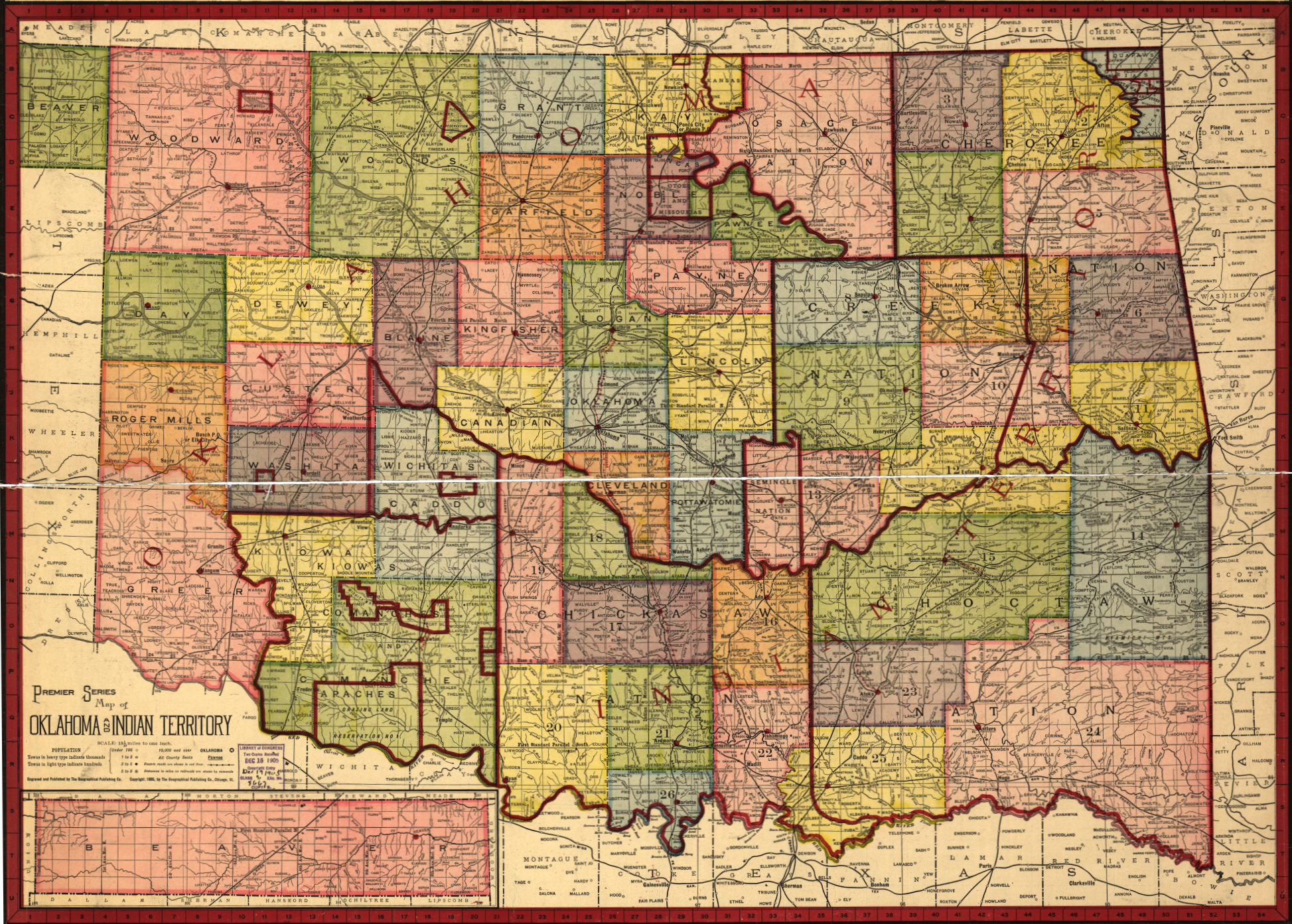
The Oklahoma Territory contained 26 counties plus the Osage Nation. Indian Territory consisted of 26 districts plus the Seminole Nation.

By the end of the day on April 22, 1889, there were more than enough settlers in the Unassigned Lands to require creation of a territorial government. However, the brief legislation that provided for the opening of the land called for no form of government in Oklahoma. No local police or courts were established; federal military troops provided law enforcement, and the United States District Court for the Western District of Arkansas under federal judge Isaac C. Parker was the only form of criminal and civil jurisdictions. Despite that, the district was generally peaceful. Most land disputes were settled without bloodshed, although a few took years to resolve. For over a year the people of Oklahoma Territory were semi-autonomous.

On May 2, 1890, Congress passed the Oklahoma Organic Act, which organized the western half of Indian Territory into Oklahoma Territory. The eastern half remained under Indian rule, predominantly that of the Five Civilized Tribes, as Indian Territory. Congress included in Oklahoma Territory the strip of country known as No Man's Land, embracing 3,681,000 acres (14,900 km^{2}), which became Beaver County.

In September 1890, the 1,282,434 acres (5,189.83 km^{2}) of the Sac and Fox, Iowa, and Pottawatomie reservations in the eastern part of Oklahoma Territory were opened to settlement. The following spring, the 4,397,771 acres (17,797.15 km^{2}) of Cheyenne and Arapaho lands in the center of the territory were opened. On September 16, 1893, the Cherokee Outlet was opened to settlement, adding 6,014,239 acres (24,338.76 km^{2}) of land.

In 1895, the Kickapoo reservation of 206,662 acres (836.33 km^{2}) was settled, and the year following Greer County, which had been considered a portion of Texas, was given to the territory by a decision of the Supreme Court of the United States. These developments, with the Kiowa, Comanche and Apache and Wichita reservations just opened, gave Oklahoma Territory a settled area of 24,000,000 acres (97,000 km^{2}), 1,725,646 acres (6,983.44 km^{2}) of which was still included in Indian reservations.

=== Path to statehood ===
With the passage of the Organic Act of 1890, Oklahoma Territory existed from 1890 to 1907. During that time, seven governors and two acting governors administered the territory. During its 17-year existence, little of note occurred because of the growing idea of statehood, which had originated in Indian Territory. Most of the governors stayed in office for only a few months; institutions founded during this time were the University of Oklahoma, the Territorial Normal School (University of Central Oklahoma), and the Oklahoma Agricultural and Mechanical School (Oklahoma State University).

In 1902, representatives of the Five Civilized Tribes met to work on securing statehood for Indian Territory and held a convention in Eufaula. In 1903, the representatives met again to organize a constitutional convention. The Sequoyah Constitutional Convention met in Muskogee on August 21, 1905. General Pleasant Porter, Principal Chief of the Creek Nation, was elected as president of the convention. The elected delegates decided that the executive officers of the Five Civilized Tribes would be appointed as vice-presidents: William C. Rogers, Principal Chief of the Cherokees; William H. Murray, appointed by Chickasaw Governor Douglas H. Johnston to represent the Chickasaw; Chief Green McCurtain of the Choctaw; Chief John Brown of the Seminole; and Charles N. Haskell, appointed by Porter to represent the Creek.

The convention drafted a constitution, drew up a plan of organization for the government, put together a map showing the counties to be established, and elected delegates to go to the United States Congress to petition for statehood. The convention's proposals were presented in a referendum in Indian Territory, in which they were overwhelmingly endorsed. The delegation received a cool reception in Washington. Eastern politicians, fearing the admission of two more Western states, put pressure on President Theodore Roosevelt. Roosevelt recommended that the Indian and Oklahoma Territories be granted joint statehood, which led to Congress passing the Oklahoma Enabling Act to allow this upon writing and ratifying a constitution.

The hard work of the Sequoyah State Constitutional Convention was not entirely lost. In 1906, when representatives from Indian Territory joined the Oklahoma State Constitutional Convention in Guthrie, they brought their constitutional experience with them. The Sequoyah Constitution served in large part as the basis for the constitution of the State of Oklahoma, which came into being with the merger of the two territories in 1907.

Territorial governor Frank Frantz oversaw the transition from territory to state. He was selected as the Republican nominee to serve as the state's first governor. He faced the Democratic Charles N. Haskell in the election on September 17, 1907. In the same election, the Oklahoma Constitution was proposed. The constitution was passed and Haskell was elected governor. Once the people of Oklahoma adopted the United States Constitution on November 16, 1907, Oklahoma and Indian Territories officially dissolved, and the State of Oklahoma was admitted to the Union as the 46th state.

== Government ==
With the passage of the Oklahoma organic act in 1890, the territorial government came into existence. The territorial government had no constitution, except for sections of the organic act creating it, which served as a semi-governing document. The organic act provided for a complete organization of the territory, defined the functions of the territorial government, placed limitations upon the acts of the legislative assembly, as well as that of the territorial officers. It also designated the town of Guthrie as the territorial capital.

Congress provided for the creation of a legislative branch elected by the people, but the executive and judicial branches of the territories were selected and appointed by the President of the United States, with the advice and consent of the United States Senate. The appointees included a governor, a secretary, three federal judges and a marshal. President Benjamin Harrison appointed George Washington Steele, a Republican from Indiana, as the first territorial governor.

=== Legislative branch ===
The organic act called for the establishment of a bicameral Territorial Legislative Assembly composed of a Territorial Council, the upper house of the assembly, and Territorial House of Representatives, the lower house of the assembly. The assembly could only create laws consistent with the Constitution of the United States and the organic act but did not require the consent of Congress to take effect. They had the same force of law, as did a law passed by a regular state government. Laws enacted by the assembly could be suspended by the President of the United States or revoked, in part or in their entirety, by an act of Congress.

When Steele took office, he issued an executive order on July 8, 1890, calling for the first elections to the assembly. The election was set for August 5, 1890. The assembly was to have convened August 12, but owing to the death of two members-elect, a special election was called, and the convening of the legislature was postponed until August 27, 1890.

The territorial assembly met for 120-day sessions in Guthrie. The first legislative session was narrowly divided between Republican and Democratic Party members, with Republicans having a slight edge in representatives. However, the Democrats allied with delegates from the People's Party (Populists) and thereby controlled both houses. Populist delegates were elected as presiding officers in both. The legislators spent most of the session arguing about the locations of the capital, the state university, state teachers' college, and the agricultural school. Only near the end of the session did they begin to address other issues necessary to create and maintain the territory. Steele became so disgusted by the political stalemate that he resigned his position and returned to Indiana. The Oklahoma Territorial Legislature met for the last time in 1905.

=== Executive branch ===
The territorial governor was vested with the executive power of the territory, was responsible for ensuring that its laws were faithfully executed, and served as the symbol of the federal government in the territory. The governor was the ex officio commander-in-chief of the territorial militia and the federal troops in the territory as well as ex officio Superintendent of Indian Affairs. The governor possessed the power to grant pardons for offenses against the laws of the territory. He could grant reprieves for offenses against the laws of the United States until the president made his decision on the matter. It was also the duty of the governor to outline the boundaries of the counties, name the county seats, and to appoint territorial and county officers with the consent of the territorial council.

Laws passed by the territorial assembly had to be presented to the governor for his approval. If he did not approve, he would veto if and return it to the assembly for reconsideration. The governor's veto could only be overridden by a two-thirds vote of the territorial assembly. The governor also had the right to convene the assembly into special session.

The territorial secretary served as the chief assistant to the governor, and in the event of a vacancy of the governorship the secretary would serve as the acting governor until the president appointed a new one. The secretary was responsible for recording and preserving the laws and proceedings of the assembly and the acts and proceedings of the governor. Copy of the same would semi-annually be submitted to the president, the president of the United States Senate, and the speaker of the United States House of Representatives for their review.

A territorial attorney was responsible for giving legal advice to the governor and assembly, served as the chief law enforcement official of the territory, and represented Oklahoma Territory and the United States in court cases. The territorial marshal was responsible for protecting the court system and for executing processes issued from the territorial courts.

==== List of governors ====
#	Name	Took office	Left office	Party	Appointed by	Photo
1	George Washington Steele	1890	1891	Republican	Benjamin Harrison	
–	Robert Martin	1891	1892	Republican	none (acting governor)	
2	Abraham Jefferson Seay	1892	1893	Republican	Benjamin Harrison	
3	William Cary Renfrow	1893	1897	Democratic	Grover Cleveland	
4	Cassius McDonald Barnes	1897	1901	Republican	William McKinley	
5	William Miller Jenkins	1901	1901	Republican	William McKinley	
–	William C. Grimes	1901	1901	Republican	none (acting governor)	
6	Thompson Benton Ferguson	1901	1906	Republican	Theodore Roosevelt	
7	Frank Frantz	1906	1907	Republican	Theodore Roosevelt	

=== Judicial branch ===
The territory's judiciary consisted of a territorial supreme court made up of three justices, a chief justice and two associate justices. Additional associate justices were added later as more counties were created in the territory. The judiciary was given a wide jurisdiction. It functioned as a United States Federal Court, but its jurisdiction extended to a trial of cases, both civil and criminal, arising under the code enacted by the territorial assembly. The court could sit half of the day as a federal court and the other half as territorial court. It would also serve as a supreme court and hear cases that had been appealed from territory's lower courts.

President Benjamin Harrison appointed Edward B. Green of Illinois as the first chief justice and John G. Clark of Wisconsin and Abraham J. Seay of Missouri as the first associate justices.

Oklahoma Territory was divided into seven Judicial Districts in 1902, as follows:

- First – Logan, Lincoln and Payne Counties
- Second – Canadian, Kingfisher, Cleveland, Washita and Custer Counties
- Third – Oklahoma and Pottawatomie Counties
- Fourth – Noble, Kay and Pawnee Counties
- Fifth – Garfield, Grant, Blaine and Roger Mills Counties
- Sixth – Woods, Woodward, Beaver, Day and Dewey Counties
- Seventh – Caddo, Comanche, Kiowa and Greer Counties

Charles Brown of Kansas was named the first Attorney General and Horace Speed of Guthrie (formerly of Indiana) was appointed the first United States attorney in Oklahoma.

=== Federal representation ===
The territory was entitled to elect one delegate to the United States House of Representatives to serve a two-year term. While unable to vote in the full House, the delegate was allowed to vote in a House committee of which the delegate was a member. The first territorial representative was David A. Harvey.

Four men represented Oklahoma Territory as non-voting delegates in the United States House of Representatives:

Congress	Delegate	Party	Years	Notes
51st	David Archibald Harvey	Republican	November 4, 1890 - March 4, 1893	
52nd	David Archibald Harvey	Republican	November 4, 1890 - March 4, 1893	
53rd	Dennis Thomas Flynn	Republican	March 4, 1893 - March 4, 1897	
54th	Dennis Thomas Flynn	Republican	March 4, 1893 - March 4, 1897	
55th	James Yancy Callahan	Free Silver	March 4, 1897 - March 4, 1899	
56th	Dennis Thomas Flynn	Republican	March 4, 1899 - March 4, 1903	
57th	Dennis Thomas Flynn	Republican	March 4, 1899 - March 4, 1903	
58th	Bird Segle McGuire	Republican	March 4, 1903 - March 4, 1907	
59th	Bird Segle McGuire	Republican	March 4, 1903 - March 4, 1907	

== Lands within the territory ==
- Unassigned Lands – April 22, 1889 – opened by land run.
- No Man's Land – May 2, 1890, assigned to Oklahoma Territory by Organic Act.
- Iowa reserve – September 22, 1891 – opened by land run.
- Sac and Fox reserve – September 22, 1891 – opened by land run.
- Tonkawa reserve – 1891 – allotment.
- Citizen Potawatomi and Absentee Shawnee reserve – September 22, 1891 – opened by land run.
- Cheyenne Arapaho reserve – April 19, 1892 – opened by land run.
- Cherokee Outlet – September 17, 1893 – opened by land run.
- Kickapoo reserve – May 4, 1896 – opened by land run.
- Greer County – March 16, 1896 – officially assigned to Oklahoma Territory (Supreme Court decision May 23, 1895, separated the county from Texas).
- Comanche, Kiowa, and Apache reserve – July 10 through August 6, 1901 – lottery.
- Wichita and Caddo reserve – July 10 through August 6, 1901 – lottery.
- Ponca and Otoe–Misouria reserve – 1904 – allotment.
- Kaw reserve – 1906 – allotment.
- Osage reserve – 1906 – allotment.
- Big Pasture – December 1906 – sealed bid.

== Counties ==
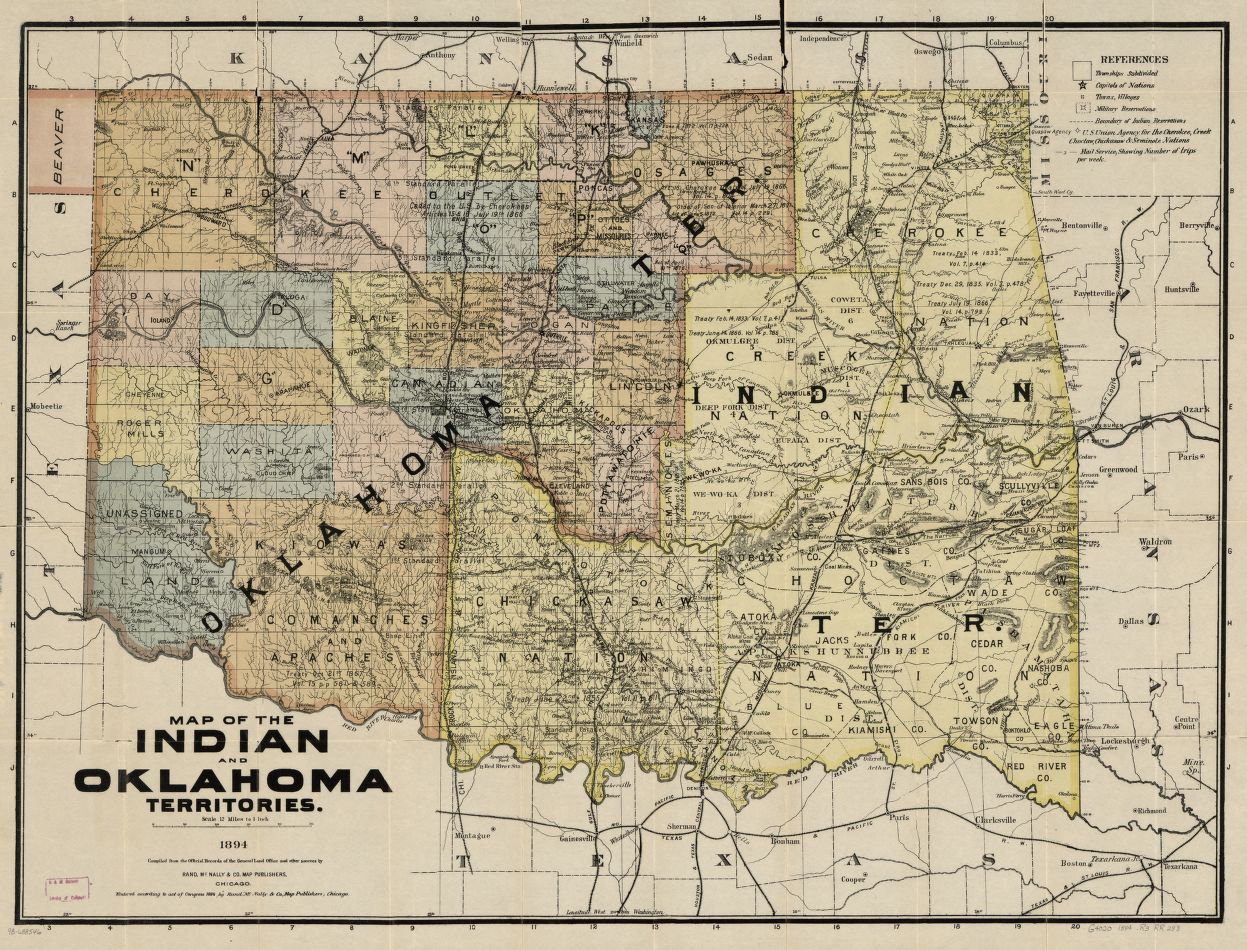
Map of Indian Territory and Oklahoma Territory in 1894, showing political subdivisions existing then. Both Territories ceased to exist November 16, 1907, when the State of Oklahoma became effective.

=== Original counties ===
When Oklahoma Territory was created in 1890, seven counties were defined and designated numerically. Thereafter, when additional lands were opened to settlement, new counties were designated by the letters of the alphabet. Later, by vote of the people, these were given permanent county names. The first seven numbered counties later were named as follows: Logan, Cleveland, Oklahoma, Canadian, Kingfisher, Payne and Beaver.

The Secretary of the Interior defined the boundaries and assigned the names of the three counties to be defined and their names assigned by executive proclamation when the Kiowa-Comanche and Wichita-Caddo Reservations were opened to settlement in 1901.

=== Greer County ===
Greer County, created by the Texas legislature on February 8, 1860, and named for John Alexander Greer, a Texas lieutenant governor, was land claimed by both Texas and the United States. The dispute arose from a map submitted with the Adams–Onís Treaty of 1819. The treaty stated that the boundary between the French claims on the north and the Spanish claims on the south of the United States was the Rio Roxo de Natchitoches (Red River) until it reached the 100th meridian west, as noted on John Melish's map published in 1818.

The upper reaches of the Red River were not surveyed, as required by the fourth article of the treaty, until 1852. The problem was that the 100th meridian on the Melish map was approximately 90 miles (140 km) east of the true 100th meridian and the Red River forked about 50 miles (80 km) east of the 100th meridian. Another survey team discovered the mapping error in 1857 and showed that the southern fork was the Red River should be the correct boundary described by the Adams–Onís Treaty. Texas rejected that assertion and claimed the land south of the North Fork. The United States claimed the land north of the South Fork, previously named the Prairie Dog Town River.

Texas continued to claim sovereignty over Greer County during and after the Civil War. It opened the land to veterans of the Texas Revolution and Confederate Army veterans and leased land to ranchers. In 1884, President Chester A. Arthur took a more active role in looking for a resolution of the dispute. However, the attempt failed to resolve anything. Meanwhile, area residents officially organized Greer County as a Texas entity in 1886, designating Mangum as the county seat. In 1890, Congress passed the Oklahoma Organic Act, which required the United States attorney general to resolve the boundary issue by filing suit against Texas.

The dispute went directly before the Supreme Court, since no lower court had jurisdiction. The court's opinion, in United States v. State of Texas 162 U.S. 1 (1896), issued on March 16, 1892, held that the land of approximately 1.5 million acres (6070 km^{2}/2345 mi^{2}) belonged to the United States. Following that ruling, on May 4, 1896, the land was officially assigned by Congress to Oklahoma Territory. The Greer County Homestead Law, passed just afterwards, gave the Texas settlers the 160 acres (647,000 m^{2}) they were living on and the option to purchase an additional 160 acres (647,000 m^{2}) for $1.00 per acre ($247/km^{2}).

When Oklahoma became the 46th U.S. state on November 16, 1907, old "Greer County" was divided into Greer, Jackson, and part of Beckham counties. Mangum remained the county seat of the redefined Greer County. Harmon County was created May 22, 1909, by a vote of the people from a portion of Greer County, Oklahoma. Mangum remained the county seat of the redefined Greer County.

In the 1900 United States census, 23 counties in the Oklahoma Territory and 6 Indian reservations reported the following population counts (after only 8 counties and 13 Indian reservations reported the following counts in the 1890 United States census):

1900 Rank	County	1890 Population	1900 Population
1	Woods	–	34,975
2	Lincoln	–	27,007
3	Logan	12,770	26,563
4	Pottawatomie	–	26,412
5	Oklahoma	11,742	25,915
6	Kay	–	22,530
7	Garfield	–	22,076
8	Payne	7,215	20,909
9	Kingfisher	8,332	18,501
10	Greer	5,338	17,922
11	Grant	–	17,273
12	Cleveland	6,605	16,388
13	Canadian	7,158	15,981
14	Washita	–	15,001
15	Pawnee	–	12,366
16	Custer	–	12,264
17	Noble	–	11,798
18	Blaine	–	10,658
19	Dewey	–	8,819
20	Woodward	–	7,469
21	Roger Mills	–	6,190
22	Beaver	2,674	3,051
23	Day	–	2,173
	Indian reservations	16,641	16,090
	Oklahoma Territory	78,475	398,331

== Notable people ==
- Elisabeth Enochs (1895–1992), American government official and journalist; born in Oklahoma Territory

== See also ==
- Compromise of 1850
- Historic regions of the United States
- History of Oklahoma
- Territorial evolution of the United States
- State of Sequoyah (proposed)
