= Temple Zion and School =

Jewish synagogue in Wisconsin

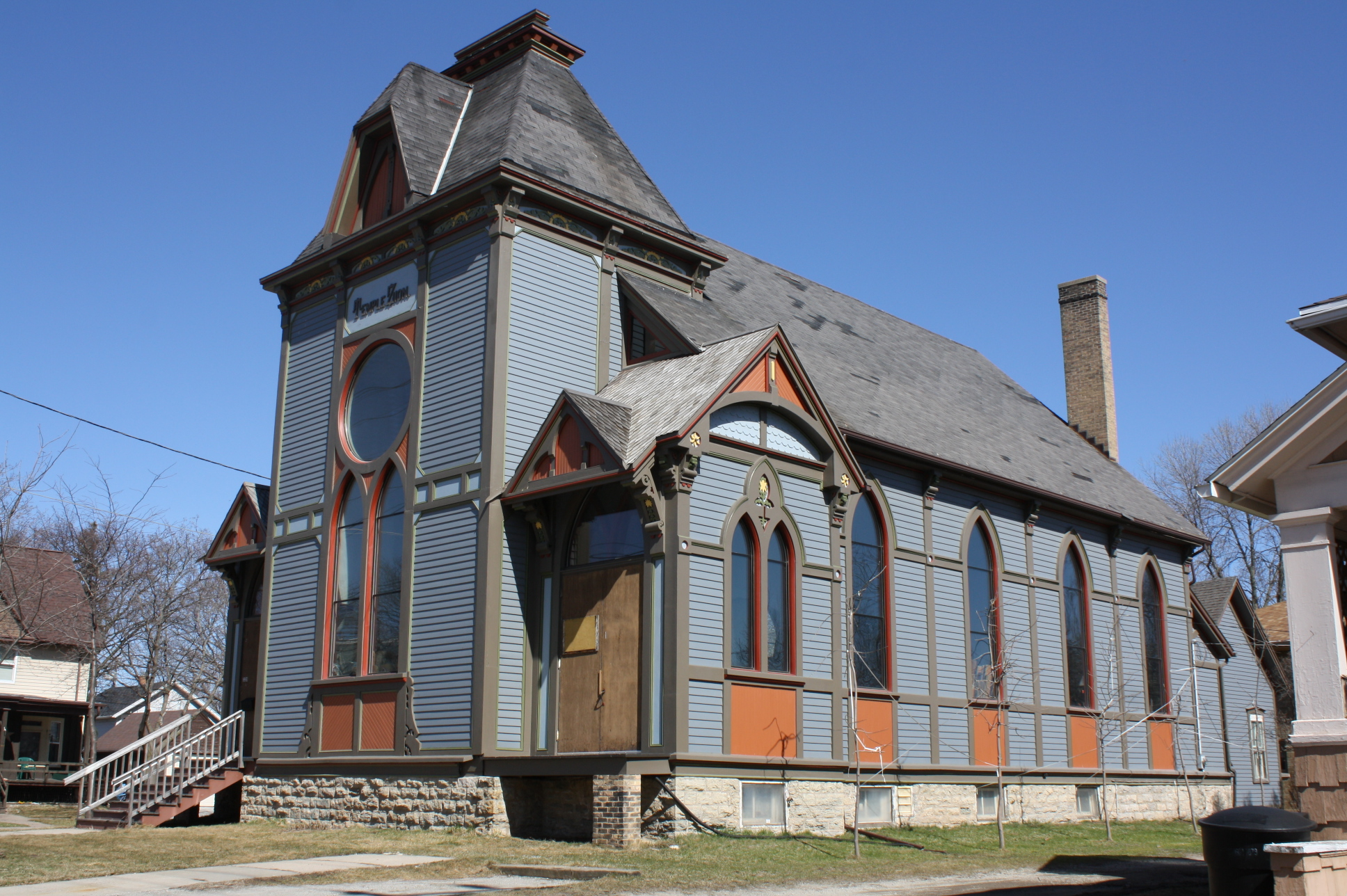
- Former synagogue in 2010, following restoration. Glimpses of the former school can be seen in the background.

- Location in Wisconsin

Religion
- Affiliation: Judaism (former)
- Ecclesiastical or organizational status: Synagogue (1883 – 1932); Church (1932 – 1977); History museum (1977 – 1999); Private use (since 1999)
- Ownership: Zion Congregation (1883 – 1932); First Assembly of God (1932 – 1977); Outagamie County Historical Society (1977 – 1999); Wahl Organbuilders (since 1999)
- Status: Active

Location
- Location: 320 North Durkee Street, Appleton, Wisconsin
- Country: United States
- Interactive map of Temple Zion and School
- Coordinates: 44°15′53″N 88°24′09″W

Architecture
- Architect: Charles Hove
- Type: Synagogue
- Style: Stick/Eastlake
- Established: c. 1850s (as a congregation)
- Completed: 1883
- Materials: Clapboard
- Temple Zion and School
- U.S. National Register of Historic Places
- NRHP reference No.: 78000123
- Added to NRHP: September 18, 1978

The Temple Zion and School is a former Jewish synagogue located at 320 North Durkee Street, and a Jewish day school located at 309 East Harris Street, both in Appleton, Wisconsin, in the United States. The synagogue was built in 1883 and was subsequently used as a church from 1932 until 1977. At that time, it was sold to the Outagamie County Historical Society for use as a history museum. In 1999 the former synagogue and school were acquired by Wahl Organbuilders.

In 1978, the former temple and school were added to the National Register of Historic Places.

== History ==
The Zion Congregation was formed in the 1850s by a group of liberal German-Jewish immigrants. Rabbi Mayer Samuel Weiss, from Hungary, was the first rabbi, elected in 1874. The synagogue was completed and dedicated in September 1883. According to a plaque outside the building, Houdini's father, Rabbi Mayer Samuel Weiss, helped plan the temple, which was "built with the financial support of many in Appleton regardless of their religion or background." The congregation added a small school behind the synagogue, where Edna Ferber was an early student, devoting a chapter to her life in Appleton in her 1938 memoir.

Temple Zion is a wonderful example of 19th century vernacular architecture. The building is not especially Jewish in style but rather a unique religious space as interpreted by Midwestern German craftsmen. The building was designed by Charles Hove.

By the 1920s, the congregation was in decline. They sold the synagogue building to the First Assembly of God in 1932, for the sum of $7,000. The church, at the time known as Pentecostal Evangelical Tabernacle, became affiliated with the General Council of the Assemblies of God and changed its name to Appleton Gospel Temple. The church renovated the interior in the 1950s. In 1977 the church sold the former synagogue and school buildings to Outagamie County Historic Society, and the building housed a museum, history workshop, and associated offices.

Unable to maintain its upkeep, Wahl Organbuilders, LLC, owned by Ronald and Christoph Wahl, purchased the former synagogue in May 1999. The building was empty and had serious visual and structural problems. Wahl Organbuilders restored the exterior of the building to its original appearance with a phased program of restoration. All four sides of the building proper as well as the smaller 'schoolhouse' building east of Temple Zion were restored to original colors, from recovered paint samples.

The Augustus B. Felgemaker organ was built in Erie, Pennsylvania and installed in the Temple in 1907. The organ had two manuals and pedal with nine stops. It was removed by the owners in 1996 and re-installed in the Lawrence University Memorial Chapel in 1999.

== Notable members ==
- Edna Ferber, the 1924 Pulitzer Prize-winning author
- David Hammel, a former mayor of Appleton
- Rabbi Mayer Samuel Weiss, the first rabbi and the father of Harry Houdini

== Gallery ==
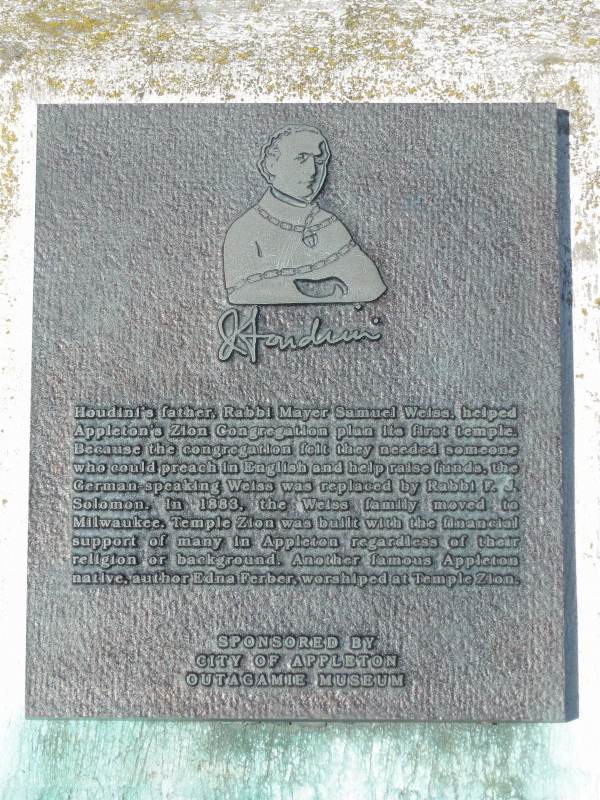
Commemorative plaque outside Temple Zion

== Additional reading ==
- Ferber, Edna (1938). A Peculiar Treasure. New York, NY: Doubleday, Doran, & Co.
