= Old Man Minick =

Story adapted into a play and film

"Old Man Minick" is a short story by American author Edna Ferber first published in 1922. It was adapted into Minick, a Broadway play staged in 1924, as well as the 1925 silent film Welcome Home, the 1932 film The Expert, and the 1939 film No Place to Go.

== Background ==
In the 1910s and 1920s, women's magazines published fiction by well-known writers, including Edith Wharton, Somerset Maugham, and Edna Ferber. During this era, the short story "Old Man Minick" was one of a variety of works first published serially in women's periodicals and then developed into plays and film. Ferber was inspired to write the story after listening to three old men on a park bench in Washington Park in Chicago as they talked about life.

== Plot ==
In Chicago in the early 20th century, a 70-year-old widower, Jo Minick, has to learn a new lifestyle after the unexpected death of his wife, to whom he had been married for 40 years. Following her death, Jo goes to live with his son George and daughter-in-law Nettie.

He joins a club in Washington Park, where he meets with other widowers. The group is divided in their opinions as to which are happier: those who live with their children, or those who live in aged care facilities. One day, Jo overhears Nettie telling her friends that she cannot have a child because she is looking after her father-in-law. Soon after, Minick informs Nettie that he is moving to a nursing home, and Nettie realises that he has heard her conversation.

Minick discovered he enjoys his life at the old people's home because he has his freedom to do what he wants.

== Play ==
The story was adapted into the 1924 Broadway play, Minick, by Ferber and George S. Kaufman, and published by Doubleday, Page & Company, in 1924.

The play had an African American actress, Emma Wise, cast as the Minicks' maid. This was unusual for plays of the segregation era. O. P. Heggie portrayed Minick in the 1924 show.

== Film adaptations ==
Famous Players–Lasky adapted the play into the 1925 silent film Welcome Home, directed by James Cruze. Warner Brothers produced the 1932 film The Expert. In 1939, Terry O. Morse directed the adaptation No Place to Go, starring Dennis Morgan.

== Publication history ==
The story was republished in Ferber's 1947 short story collection One Basket, and the 1955 anthology, The Golden Argosy: The Most Celebrated Short Stories in the English Language.
