= The Land Is Bright =

1941 dramatic play by George S. Kaufman and Edna Ferber

First edition (publ. Doubleday, Doran)

The Land Is Bright is a 1941 dramatic play by George S. Kaufman and Edna Ferber.

The play, which opened as World War II raged and shortly before American entry into that war, is an epic with patriotic themes. It covers three generations of the fictional Kincaid family, robber barons who made their family fortune with questionable tactics in the 19th century (the family patriarch may have actually robbed, cheated, and even murdered in his rise from humble railroad worker to multi-millionaire). The second and third acts follow the family over the next generations as they strive to become acceptable in respectable New York high society. The second and some of the third generation engages in much difficult behavior (consorting with murderous gangsters, multiple marriages, abandoning America) but as the play moves to current time the last generation redeems the family: the patriarch's grandson abjures the pursuit of wealth to serve in the government for the emergency, one great-grandson has enlisted in the Air Corps, and most of the other Kincaids exhibit redemptive behavior and learn the nature of patriotic sacrifice in order to become true Americans. The final act ends with a rousing speech for patriotic action in the face of the rising Nazi Germany.

The Land Is Bright is one of Kaufman's few dramas, as he mostly wrote comedies, satire, and musicals. Kaufman and Ferber had earlier collaborated on Minick, The Royal Family, Dinner at Eight, and Stage Door, and would again on Bravo!.

The Land Is Bright opened on Broadway at the Music Box Theatre on October 28, 1941. Players included Leon Ames and Diana Barrymore as Grant and Linda Kincaid; other players included Walter Beck, Constance Brigham, Grover Burgess, and Ruth Findlay who came out retirement to play her last Broadway role. Future TV star Dick Van Patten played a juvenile role. Max Gordon produced, Kaufmann directed, and Jo Mielziner designed the sets. The Land Is Bright was not a big hit, closing on January 3, 1942 after 79 performances and losing about $20,000.

John Mason Brown, writing in the New York World-Telegram, gave The Land Is Bright a review which helped kill the play: "Although Mr. Kaufman and Miss Ferber are far from their best when they now re-employ [the through-the-generations story device], The Land Is Bright is one of those productions at which you do listen and listen attentively (often out of sheer incredulity)... it is impossible not to realize that as dramatic literature The Land Is Bright is something to be taken about as seriously as a comic strip serial, which it closely resembles". Eleanor Roosevelt was more enthusiastic, particularly of the message: "leaves you no moment when you are not tensely held by the action on the stage... There were times when... the story was slightly overdrawn, and yet... I came away with one great sense of satisfaction, for... It points the moral that the whole level of public responsibility and integrity has gone up over the period of the last fifty years."

The play was published once, in 1941, and is out print since, being available only in manuscript form and has been rarely staged since its Broadway run. The Palmetto Players of Converse College mounted a production in 1942.
