= Cimarron (novel) =

1930 novel by Edna Ferber

- First edition (Doubleday, Doran)
- Author: Edna Ferber
- Publication date: April 1930

Cimarron is a novel by Edna Ferber, published in April 1930 and based on development in Oklahoma after the Land Rush. The book was adapted into a critically acclaimed film of the same name, released in 1931 through RKO Pictures. The story was again adapted for the screen by Metro-Goldwyn-Mayer and was released in 1960, to meager success.

== Background ==
=== The Land Rush ===
The Oklahoma Land Rush (also called the Oklahoma Land Race and Cherokee Strip Land Run) plays a pivotal role in both the novel and film adaptations. "Manifest destiny" and the desperation of the settlers involved in the rush provides the opening drama and sets the stage for the twists and turns in the book. Every settler is desperate to stake his claim on the best piece of land (near water).

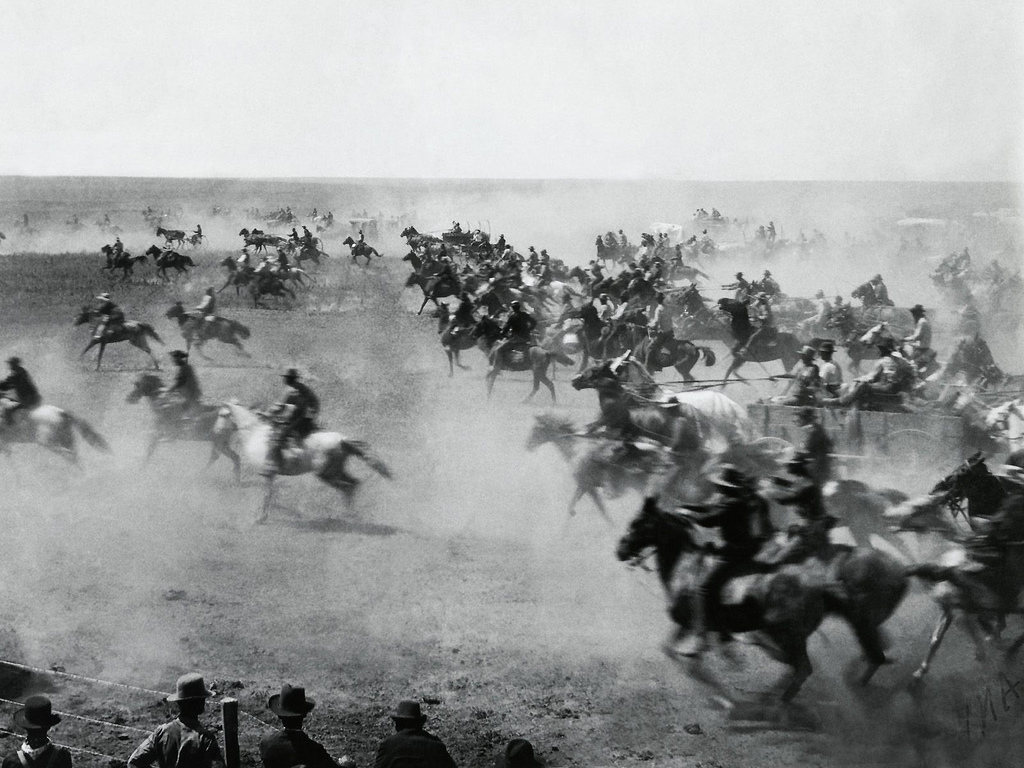
Photograph of the 1893 Oklahoma Land Rush, depicted in Ferber's book and films.

Cimarron involves two land runs. The first, for the Unassigned Lands, occurred on April 22, 1889. The second, for the Cherokee Outlet (commonly called the Cherokee Strip) occurred in 1893. The piece of land in question had been allotted to the Cherokee Nation as part of the 1828 Treaty of New Echota, while the rest of the Oklahoma Territory had been opened to settlers. As commerce grew across the area of Kansas and Oklahoma, cattlemen became increasingly annoyed by the presence of the Cherokee on prime land that they wanted to use to drive cattle from northern ranches to Texas. Some of this annoyance with the Native people can be attributed to the decision made by the Cherokees to side with the Confederate States of America during the American Civil War. In the 1880s, the government attempted to lease the land for cattle ranching, but the Native Americans refused. Eventually, the Cherokee people did sell the land to the government.

Throughout the remaining years of the 1880s various cattle associations and ranches fought over the land. Disputes even turned deadly, as large cattle companies and small ranchers both claimed the land as their own. This eventually led to a ban on cattle ranching in the area, and in 1893 the land, 58 miles (93 km) wide by 225 miles (362 km) long, was opened to homesteaders. The land was divided into 42,000 claims, and each homesteader had to literally stake (put a stake with a white flag attached) their claim, and pick up a certificate back at the starting place. Nearly 100,000 people arrived for the rush, and over half of them would be sent back home after the day was through.

== Novel ==
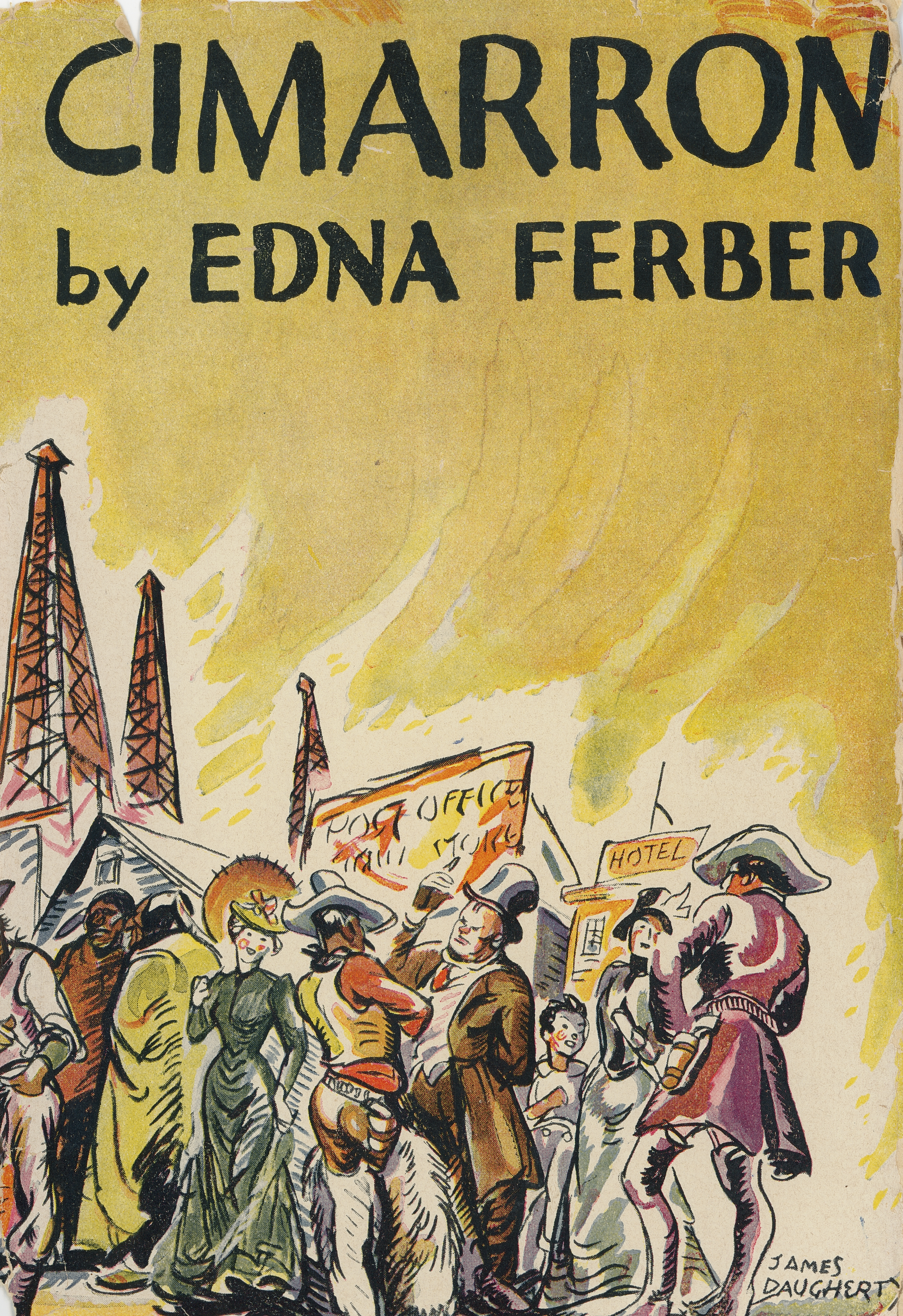
Cover from a 1930 edition.

Cimarron derives its name from the Cimarron Territory. The Cimarron Territory was an unrecognized name for the No Man's Land, an unsettled area of the West and Midwest, especially lands once inhabited by Native American tribes such as the Cherokee and Sioux. In 1886 the government declared such lands open to settlement. At the time of the novel's opening, Oklahoma is one such "Cimarron Territory," though in actuality the historical setting of the novel is somewhere in the Cherokee Outlet, also known as the Cherokee Strip, and probably the city of Guthrie, Oklahoma.

The novel is set in the Oklahoma of the late nineteenth and early twentieth centuries. It follows the lives of Yancey and Sabra Cravat, beginning with Yancey's tale of his participation in the 1893 land rush. They emigrate from Wichita, Kansas, to the fictional town of Osage, Oklahoma with their son Cim and—unknowingly—a black boy named Isaiah. In Osage, the Cravats print their newspaper, the Oklahoma Wigwam, and build their fortune amongst Indian disputes, outlaws, and the discovery of oil in Oklahoma.

Upon its publication, Cimarron was a sensation in America and came to epitomize an era in American history. It was the best selling novel of 1930, as it provided readers an outlet to escape their present suffering in the Great Depression. This novel became Ferber's third successful novel and paved the way for many more Ferber-penned historical epics, and it was published as an Armed Services Edition during WWII.

While it became seen as a triumphant feminist story detailing Sabra Cravat's growth from a traditional American housewife into a successful leader and politician, Ferber stated in her autobiography, A Peculiar Treasure, that the novel was originally intended as a satirical criticism of American womanhood and American sentimentality. Throughout the novel, Sabra's practice of imperial domesticity can be seen in her attempts to "civilize" Native Americans by forcing them to adopt white values, and her fixation on expanding her own sphere of influence, which as a woman, was traditionally her home.

The character of Yancey Cravat is based on Temple Lea Houston, last child of Texas icon Sam Houston. Temple Houston was a brilliant trial lawyer known for his flamboyant courtroom theatrics. He was also a competent gunfighter who killed at least one man in a stand-up shootout.

== Films ==
=== 1931 film ===
The 1931 film adaptation.

Hollywood had long since taken notice of writer Edna Ferber's talents. The first Ferber adaptation came in 1918 with the silent Our Mrs. McChesney, based on a play Ferber had written. So Big was released as a film the same year it was published as a novel, and adaptations of Gigolo and Show Boat also followed. With the advent of sound, Ferber adaptations had even more promise. Immediately following its publication, many production companies courted Ferber. Ferber ended up selling the film rights to RKO Pictures in 1930 for a record $125,000 (a large sum even for today).

Despite America being in the depths of the Depression, RKO immediately prepared for a big-budget picture, investing more than $1.5 million into Ferber's novel Cimarron. Director Wesley Ruggles would direct stars Richard Dix and Irene Dunne with a script written by Howard Estabrook. Filming began in the summer of 1930 at the Jasmin Quinn Ranch outside of Los Angeles, California. The film was a massive production, especially the land rush scenes, which recalled the epic scenes of Intolerance some fifteen years earlier. More than 5,000 extras, twenty-eight cameramen, and numerous camera assistants and photographers were used to capture scenes of wagons racing across grassy hills and prairies. Cinematographer Edward Cronjager spent overtime planning out every scene in accordance to Ferber's descriptions.

The film was premiered in New York City on January 26, 1931, to much praise, and a Los Angeles premiere followed on February 6. Three days later the film was released to theaters throughout the nation. Despite being a critical success, the high budget and ongoing Great Depression combined against the film. While it was a commercial success in line with other films of the day, RKO could not recoup their investment in the film.

=== 1960 film ===
The remake of Cimarron included many changes from the Ferber novel and especially from the 1931 film. With the Civil Rights Movement gaining momentum, the script, written by Arnold Schulman, took a kinder approach to Native Americans. Schulman gave the people more dignity and recognized that they were losing land that was rightfully theirs through the 1893 land rush that was the film's centerpiece. He also introduced several minor characters, such as journalist Sam Pegler (Robert Keith) and Wes Jennings (Vic Morrow), a prominent member of Cherokee Kid's (Russ Tamblyn) gang.

In 1961 the film was nominated for two Academy Awards: Best Art Direction-Set Decoration, Color (art directors George W. Davis and Addison Hehr) and Best Sound, but failed to win either. Cimarron marked the end of the Ferber adaptations.

== See also ==
- Far and Away (1992), starring Tom Cruise and Nicole Kidman
