= The Golden Argosy (book) =

Anthology of short stories

The Golden Argosy: The Most Celebrated Short Stories in the English Language
- First edition
- Author: Various
- Language: English
- Publisher: Dial Press
- Publication date: 1955
- Publication place: USA
- Media type: Print (hardcover)
- Pages: 656
- OCLC: 297040

The Golden Argosy: The Most Celebrated Short Stories in the English Language is an anthology edited by Charles Grayson and Van H. Cartmell, and published by Dial Press in 1955. It is famous for being the favorite book of novelist Stephen King. King, who recalls that "I first found The Golden Argosy in a Lisbon Falls (Maine) bargain barn called the Jolly White Elephant, where it was on offer for $2.25. At that time I only had four dollars, and spending over half of it on one book, even a hardcover, was a tough decision. I've never regretted it." He calls it "an amazing resource for readers and writers, a treasury in every sense of the word... The Golden Argosy taught me more about good writing than all the writing classes I've ever taken. It was the best $2.25 I ever spent."

== Stories ==
- "I'm a Fool" by Sherwood Anderson
- "The Happy Hypocrite" by Max Beerbohm
- "The Devil and Daniel Webster" by Stephen Vincent Benét
- "The Damned Thing" by Ambrose Bierce
- "The Chink and the Child" by Thomas Burke
- "Paul's Case" by Willa Cather
- "Back for Christmas" by John Collier
- "Youth" by Joseph Conrad
- "The Bar Sinister" by Richard Harding Davis
- "The Red-Headed League" by Arthur Conan Doyle
- "A Rose for Emily" by William Faulkner
- "Old Man Minick" by Edna Ferber
- "The Rich Boy" by F. Scott Fitzgerald
- "The Celestial Omnibus" by E.M. Forster
- "The Three Strangers" by Thomas Hardy
- "The Outcasts of Poker Flat" by Bret Harte
- "The Killers" by Ernest Hemingway
- "The Gift of the Magi" by O. Henry
- "The Gioconda Smile" by Aldous Huxley
- "The Monkey's Paw" by W.W. Jacobs
- "The Man Who Would Be King" by Rudyard Kipling
- "The Incarnation of Krishna Mulvaney" by Rudyard Kipling
- "Champion" by Ring Lardner
- "To Build a Fire" by Jack London
- "The Fly" by Katherine Mansfield
- "Rain" by W. Somerset Maugham
- "Big Blonde" by Dorothy Parker
- "The Murders in the Rue Morgue" by Edgar Allan Poe
- "The Gold-Bug" by Edgar Allan Poe
- "Flowering Judas" by Katherine Anne Porter
- "Tobermory" by Saki
- "The Leader of the People" by John Steinbeck
- "Markheim" by Robert L. Stevenson
- "A Lodging for the Night" by Robert L. Stevenson
- "The Lady, or the Tiger?" by Frank R. Stockton
- "Monsieur Beaucaire" by Booth Tarkington
- "The Secret Life of Walter Mitty" by James Thurber
- "The Celebrated Jumping Frog of Calaveras County" by Mark Twain
- "The Other Wise Man" by Henry Van Dyke
- "Chickamauga" by Thomas Wolfe
