= Ruth Findlay =

American actress

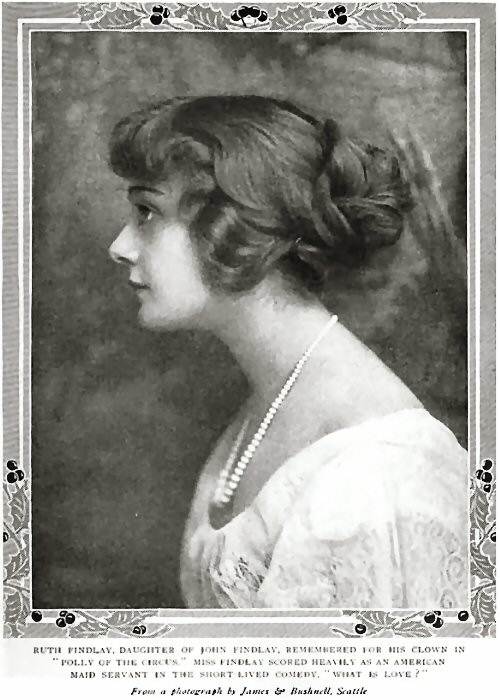
- Findlay in Munsey's Magazine, 1915
- Born: September 19, 1896; Jersey City, New Jersey, US
- Died: July 13, 1949 (aged 52); New York City, New York, US
- Occupation: Actress
- Spouse: Donald W. Lamb (married 1927–1949)

Ruth Findlay (September 19, 1896 – July 13, 1949) was an American stage actress active over the early decades of the 20th century.

She is not to be confused with the later film actress Ruth Findlay (1917–1976).

== Biography ==
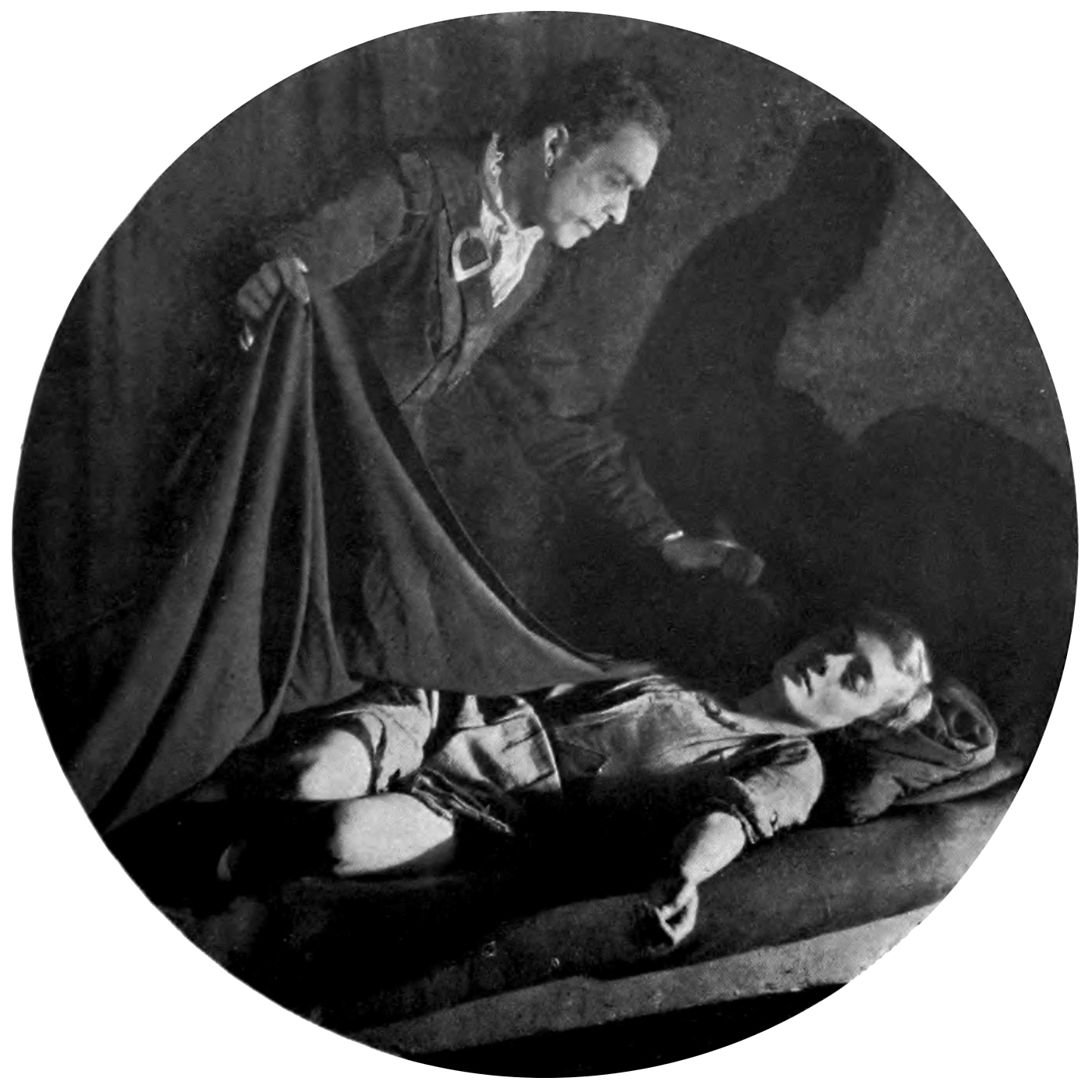
William Faversham and Ruth Findlay in the Broadway production of The Prince and the Pauper (1920)

Findlay was born on September 19, 1896, in The Heights, a neighborhood of Jersey City, New Jersey. Her parents were John and Margaret Findlay, both originally from Scotland. Her father, a character actor known for his portrayal of butlers and priests, was born in Glasgow with the surname Macpherson.

Findlay was raised in New York City, where she attended private schools and first appeared on stage at around the age of 12 in Mrs. Wiggs of the Cabbage Patch and later Baby Mine at Daly’s Theatre. Her first major role came a few years later in a road production of Rebecca of Sunnybrook Farm and in 1917 she found success playing Marguerite in A Successful Calamity at Broadway’s Booth Theatre.

In November 1920 the diminutive 5-foot-2-inch (157 cm) actress began a seven-month run at the Booth Theatre playing the dual roles of Tom Canty and Prince Edward in Amélie Rives' stage adaptation of Mark Twain's The Prince and the Pauper.

Findlay’s last Broadway performances were playing Deborah Hawks in the 1941 production of The Land Is Bright at the Music Box Theatre.

During the early years of her acting career Findlay appeared in at least six silent films, all produced before 1920. Her most notable film performance may have been as Dora Baxter in The Salamander (1916), a film based on the 1913 novel by Owen Johnson. Over her career, she worked with William Gillette, William Farnum, Eugene O'Brien, Lionel Barrymore and William Faversham.

Findlay left the stage within a year or so of her marriage to investment banker Donald W. Lamb in 1927. In 1941 she came out of retirement to appear in The Land Is Bright, a play written by George S. Kaufman and Edna Ferber.

Ruth Findlay Lamb died in New York City on July 13, 1949. She was survived by her husband, three sisters and a brother.
