= Stage Door =

1937 film by Gregory La Cava

- Stage Door theatrical poster
- Directed by: Gregory La Cava
- Screenplay by: Morrie Ryskind; Anthony Veiller
- Based on: Stage Door; 1936 play by Edna Ferber; George S. Kaufman
- Produced by: Pandro S. Berman
- Starring: Katharine Hepburn; Ginger Rogers; Adolphe Menjou; Gail Patrick; Constance Collier; Andrea Leeds; Samuel S. Hinds; Lucille Ball
- Cinematography: Robert De Grasse
- Edited by: William Hamilton
- Music by: Roy Webb
- Production company: RKO Radio Pictures
- Distributed by: RKO Radio Pictures
- Release date: October 8, 1937
- Running time: 92 minutes
- Country: United States
- Language: English
- Budget: $952,000
- Box office: $1.8 million

Stage Door is a 1937 American tragicomedy film directed by Gregory La Cava, and starring Katharine Hepburn, Ginger Rogers, Adolphe Menjou, Gail Patrick, Constance Collier, Andrea Leeds, Samuel S. Hinds, and Lucille Ball. Adapted from the 1936 play of the same name, it tells the story of several would-be actresses who live together in a boarding house at 158 West 58th Street in New York City. It was produced and distributed by RKO Pictures. Eve Arden and Ann Miller, who became notable in later films, play minor characters.

The film was adapted by Morrie Ryskind and Anthony Veiller from the play by Edna Ferber and George S. Kaufman, but the play's storyline and the characters' names were almost completely changed for the movie, so much so in fact that Kaufman joked the film should be called "Screen Door".

== Plot ==
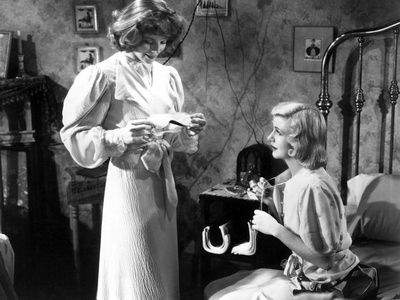
Katharine Hepburn and Ginger Rogers in Stage Door

At 87 West 58th Street, New York City: Hattie sings and cleans the Footlights Club (Note: The Footlights Club is inspired by the real-life Rehearsal Club, according to Robert Osborne, host of Turner Classic Movies.) theatrical boarding house, directing Judith Canfield to the phone, while flippant, cynical dancer Jean Maitland strips stolen stockings from Linda Shaw, starting a squabble. Judy asks Jean to eschew "lamb stew" for a dinner double-date with Seattle lumbermen Milbanks and Dukenfield. Influential theatrical producer Anthony Powell arrives for Ms. Shaw, who acerbically taunts Jean about setting her up with Powell's chauffeur. Mrs. Orcutt boards Terry Randall, whose polished manners and superior attitude alienates aspiring actresses living there, particularly her new roommate Jean. Having expensive clothing and her elderly grandfather's photograph, Jean assumes Terry has a sugar daddy, just as Linda has her Anthony. In truth, Terry's Midwest family is wealthy, but her father, "Wheat King" Henry Sims, objecting to her career choice, cuts off his funding. Regardless, Terry determines to fulfill her acting dreams. Aging actress Anne Luther appoints herself Terry's mentor and acting coach.

Pianist Olga Brent helps Jean and Annie practice dance routines, as Powell observes. Later, seated with his butler Harcourt, Powell decides to dump Linda, who Jean taunts during a floor show at Club Grotto, which Powell half-owns. He starts dating Jean.

Judy and Eve wait for Terry to "crash Powell's office" as well-liked Kay Hamilton arrives. Although successful, having had rave reviews the year before, Kay has not had any parts since, and is running out of money. She desperately hopes for the leading role of Jeanette in Powell's new play, Enchanted April, but Powell cancels her appointment. Kay faints from malnutrition and disappointment, at which Terry barges past Powell's secretary Ms. Arden, berating Powell's callousness. As a result, Footlights Club residents warm up to the newcomer.

Terry's father secretly finances Enchanted April through his proxy, Richard Carmichael, on the condition that Terry is given the starring role, hoping she will fail and return home. To see Powell, Jean breaks off relations with Bill, whose recent show was "a flop." But Anthony quickly shows her to the door after his "little boy" and Pygmalion and Galatea allusions fail to seduce the inebriated Jean.

Powell invites Terry to his penthouse to offer the part of Jeanette, trying to seduce her the same way he did Linda and Jean, but Terry rejects him. Jean shows up unannounced, giving Terry the opportunity to save her friend from Powell's philandering, by pretending Powell seduced her. Succeeding, Footlights Club friendships are frayed. Terry lands the plum part, breaking Kay's heart on her birthday. But Terry's inexperience and woodenly bad rehearsal performance draws criticism from the stage director and playwright; Powell tries rescinding his contract with Sims.

For opening night, Butch the butcher picks up Hattie, and Louisiana hopeful Mary Lou leaves to attend her "35th performance as a spectator." Kay tries to steady Terry's nerves, coaching her how to play her role; Jeanette would hold the flowers "as she would a child...in memory of something that has died," which she says is "not a play, it really happened to someone I know. This isn't just your night. It's my night too." Kay urges Terry to be a success, and "give a great performance, no matter what happens." Giving Terry her good luck ring as a gift, Kay encourages, "I'll be there, in spirit," as she ascends to an upstairs window.

At Berkley Theatre, learning from Jean that Kay committed suicide, Terry decides she cannot go on. Anne Luther insists that she must, not just for herself and the tradition of the theatre, but also for Kay. Terry gives a heartfelt performance. She and the play are a hit, much to her father's chagrin. At her curtain call, Terry gives a speech in tribute to her dead friend, and Terry and Jean are reconciled.

Epilogue: The play remains a success for months. Terry continues to board at the Footlights Club. Jean reconnects with Bill. Mary Lou finally gets a part. Judy leaves to marry Milbanks. Another newcomer arrives, looking for a room.

== Cast ==
- Katharine Hepburn as Terry Randall
- Ginger Rogers as Jean Maitland
- Adolphe Menjou as Anthony Powell
- Lucille Ball as Judy Canfield
- Eve Arden as Eve
- Ann Miller as Annie
- Gail Patrick as Linda Shaw
- Constance Collier as Anne Luther
- Andrea Leeds as Kay Hamilton
- Samuel S. Hinds as Henry Sims
- Franklin Pangborn as Harcourt, Powell's butler
- William Corson as Bill
- Pierre Watkin as Richard Carmichael
- Grady Sutton as "Butch"
- Frank Reicher as Stage Director
- Jack Carson as Mr. Milbanks, a Seattle lumberman who takes Jean to dinner
- Phyllis Kennedy as Hattie
- Margaret Early as Mary Lou
- Florence Reed (uncredited)

== Production ==
=== Development ===
RKO Radio Pictures purchased film rights to the stage play of the same name for $130,000. The film only sparsely resembles the play, except in a few character names, such as Kay Hamilton, Jean Maitland, Terry Randall, Linda Shaw, and Judith Canfield. In the play, Terry Randall is from a rural family whose father is a country doctor, and Jean Maitland is actually a shallow girl who becomes a movie star. Kay Hamilton does commit suicide, but for completely different reasons and not on an opening night.

=== Casting ===
Katharine Hepburn and Ginger Rogers were cast in lead roles, each for a respective salary of $75,000. Rogers, who was a close friend of Lucille Ball, suggested Ball for the role of Judy Canfield to producer Pandro S. Berman. Ann Miller, who was cast in the supporting part of Annie, was only fourteen years old when she appeared in the film.

Burgess Meredith and Barton MacLane were considered for a role in the film, and Douglas Fairbanks Jr. was also considered for the part of Tony Powell, which ultimately went to Adolphe Menjou. Andrea Leeds, who was cast as Kay Hamilton, was borrowed by RKO from her contract with Samuel Goldwyn Studios.

=== Filming ===
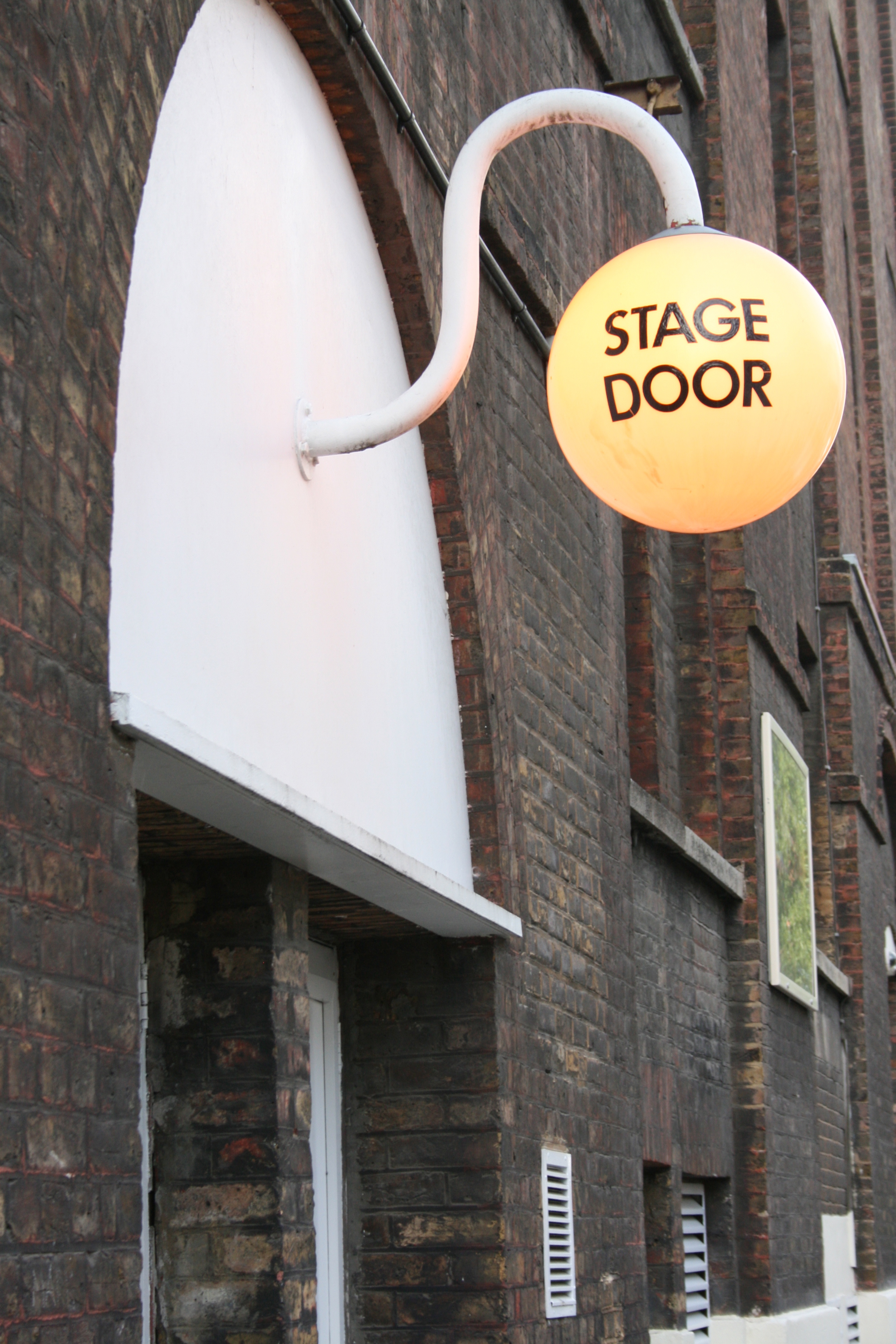

Principal photography for Stage Door began on June 7, 1937, and was completed on July 31, 1937. Director Gregory La Cava also allowed the actresses to ad lib and improvise dialogue during filming, which earned him praise from stars Leeds and Rogers. Hepburn's famous lines during the play within the film, "The calla lilies are in bloom again. Such a strange flower, suitable to any occasion. I carried them on my wedding day and now I place them here in memory of something that has died," are from The Lake (1934), the play for which Dorothy Parker panned Hepburn's performance as "running the gamut of emotions from A to B."

== Release ==
The film was released to the theaters in the United States on October 8, 1937.

=== Home media ===
After Kay commits suicide, there is a brief shot of her grave as part of the montage of the success of the play, which was once edited out on all television showings and is not present in some early home media releases. The shot was restored for DVD and subsequent TV broadcasts. As of 2025 and beyond, Stage Door has been released on DVD in the US, UK, Italy, France and Spain on various labels including Warner Bros., Universal and Sony.

Warner Bros. first released the film on DVD on March 1, 2005. The Warner Archive Collection reissued the film on DVD on May 6, 2016.

== Reception ==
=== Box office ===
Stage Door grossed $1,762,000 at the United States box office, for small profit of $81,000.

=== Critical response ===
The film received favorable reviews from critics, with Film Daily declaring it one of the ten best films of the year. Frank Nugent of The New York Times described it as a "brilliant picture" with "amazingly good" performances, and summarized the film as "a magnificently devastating reply on Hollywood's behalf to all the catty little remarks that George Kaufman and Edna Ferber had made about it in their play."

The reviewer in The Times wrote of January 3, 1938, after the film's London premiere at the Regal on December 31, 1937:

Stories of life on the stage have always appealed to Hollywood: here success is sensational and meteoric, and failure equally sudden and dramatic. We know the formula by heart, and expect of our entertainment that it shall be rowdy, aggressive, and spectacular, culminating in the rise of the central character to fame in the bright lights of Broadway. Stage Door is rowdy and aggressive, and it does end in success for one of its characters and failure for another, but for all that it is a film of unusual insight and characterization. (...) The dialogue is brilliant, with typical American point and brevity, but nearly always spiteful and cruel, for these girls are the product of a hard environment. Three stand out from among the rest: Miss Katharine Hepburn (...) Miss Ginger Rogers (...) Miss Andrea Leeds.

— "New films in London: Back-stage tragedy", The Times, January 3, 1938, p. 10.

Hepburn's four movies preceding Stage Door had been commercial failures. However, as a result of the positive response to this performance, RKO immediately cast her opposite Cary Grant in the screwball comedy Bringing Up Baby (1938).

=== Accolades ===
Award/association	Year	Category	Recipient(s) and nominee(s)	Result	Ref.
Academy Awards	1938	Outstanding Production	RKO Radio Pictures	Nominated	
Academy Awards	1938	Best Director	Gregory La Cava	Nominated	
Academy Awards	1938	Best Supporting Actress	Andrea Leeds	Nominated	
Academy Awards	1938	Best Screenplay Adaptation	Morris Ryskind, Anthony Veiller	Nominated	

== Other adaptations ==
Stage Door inspired the 1938 Golden Age Argentine film Women Who Work by Manuel Romero, which also takes place in an all-female boarding house.

A 60-minute radio version of Stage Door was performed on Lux Radio Theatre on February 20, 1939, broadcast over the CBS Radio network. Ginger Rogers and Adolphe Menjou reprised their roles from the film, while Rosalind Russell replaced Katharine Hepburn as Terry Randall. Eve Arden, who played minor character Eve in the film, replaced Gail Patrick as Linda Shaw. The radio broadcast was included as a bonus feature on the 2005 Warner Bros. DVD release of the film.

Stage Door was presented on CBS Radio again on December 5, 1941 on Philip Morris Playhouse. The 30-minute adaptation by Charles Martin starred Geraldine Fitzgerald as Terry Randall.

On April 6, 1955, a 60-minute version of the play, adapted by Gore Vidal, aired on the CBS Television series The Best of Broadway. It starred Rhonda Fleming, Elsa Lanchester, Diana Lynn, and Victor Moore.
