= Rehearsal Club (New York City) =

Theatrical ingenue boarding house (1913–1979)

The Rehearsal Club
- Formation: 1913
- Founder: Jean "Daisy" Greer and Jane Harriss Hall
- Type: Young Women's Residence
- Purpose: Affordable housing and mentorship for women pursuing the performing arts.
- Headquarters: 218-220 West 46th Street; New York, NY
- Location: United States
- Official language: English
- President: Gale Patron
- Website: http://www.rehearsalclubnyc.com

The Rehearsal Club was a theatrical ingenue boarding house founded in 1913 by Jean "Daisy" Greer, daughter of New York's Episcopal bishop, and Jane Harriss Hall, an Episcopal Deaconess. The residence provided young women pursuing theater a place to rest between auditions, along with opportunities to socialize and receive simple meals. Within a year, the Professional Children’s School was established in the back parlor of The Rehearsal Club.

== History ==
In 1920, the Club relocated from its first home on West 46th Street to a large house on West 45th to accommodate increasing residency. In 1923, the Club moved to 47 West 53rd Street between Fifth and Sixth Avenue. Two years later, in 1925, The Rehearsal Club expanded into the neighboring building, 45 West 53rd Street. Both houses were owned by Rockefeller family members, and the Club remained there for over 50 years.

The Rehearsal Club served as the inspiration for Edna Ferber and George S. Kaufman's 1936 play Stage Door, which was adapted into the 1937 film of the same name starring Katharine Hepburn and Ginger Rogers.

One of the most noted Rehearsal Club residents was Carol Burnett. In 1955, she initiated and was featured in a showcase of her fellow Club friends called 'The Rehearsal Club Revue,' which served as an initial career boost for several of the girls. Ms. Burnett sponsored scholarships for Club residents in the 1960s, and fondly recalls her Club life in her memoirs This Time Together and One More Time: A Memoir. Many well known alums include Yvonne Craig, Blythe Danner, Cynthia Darlow, Diane Keaton and Sandy Duncan and a host of others.

Although men were not allowed upstairs, many did hang out in the Rehearsal Club’s first-floor parlor. James Dean, before he became a Hollywood legend, often visited the Rehearsal Club and for a time dated resident Liz Sheridan, also known as "Dizzy," then a 23-year-old fledgling dancer on the Milton Berle Show.

In 1979, Rockefeller Brothers Fund sold the buildings at 45–47 West 53rd Street to American Folk Art Museum and the Rehearsal Club closed for good.

== Today ==
After a 2006 revival of the play Stage Door, Rehearsal Club alumni gathered and reignited the Rehearsal Club as a membership organization with a mission to "preserve the name of The Rehearsal Club, protect its legacy and inspire other younger generations." Membership is open to everyone, regardless of past affiliation with the organization.

In 2018, The Rehearsal Club relaunched their Residency Program to provide a safe and affordable haven for young women seeking careers in the performing arts. The organization became a 501(c)3 nonprofit in 2020. And on October 20, 2023, The Rehearsal Club celebrated its 110th anniversary with an exclusive event honoring former resident Blythe Danner.

In 2025, the organization's Residency Program moved from its temporary location at Webster Apartments in Chelsea to a beautiful brownstone in Harlem. The Residency houses up to ten residents at any given time with shared common spaces including multiple living rooms, a kitchen, and backyard. Residency applications are accepted at rehearsalclubnyc.com and a waitlist is maintained.
