= Saratoga (musical) =

- Original Recording
- Music: Harold Arlen
- Lyrics: Johnny Mercer
- Book: Morton DaCosta
- Basis: Edna Ferber's novel Saratoga Trunk
- Productions: 1959 Broadway

Saratoga is a 1959 musical with a book by Morton DaCosta, lyrics by Johnny Mercer, and music by Harold Arlen.

Based on Edna Ferber's sprawling 1941 novel Saratoga Trunk, it focuses on Clio Dulaine, an "illegitimate" Creole woman who seeks revenge on the New Orleans family who exiled her mother when she became impregnated by their son. Posing as a countess raised in France, she joins forces with Montana cowboy Clint Maroon, whose family's property was appropriated by railroad tycoon Bart Van Steed. Clint persuades Clio to seduce Bart into proposing marriage, but the conspirators soon find themselves falling in love while scheming to settle old scores.

The success of the musical adaptation of Ferber's Show Boat convinced her lightning could strike twice. She first approached Rodgers and Hammerstein with her proposal, and when they opted to write Pipe Dream instead, she turned to Lerner and Loewe, who agreed to compose the score but lost interest after My Fair Lady opened. DaCosta wrote a first draft of the book, which Ferber disliked, and when her offer to adapt the book herself was declined, she backed out of the project.

The bulk of the financing was provided by NBC and RCA Victor, which released the original cast recording. Rock Hudson and Jeanmaire originally were announced as the leads, but ultimately neither participated in the show.

The Broadway production, directed by DaCosta and choreographed by Ralph Beaumont, opened on December 7, 1959, at the Winter Garden Theatre, where it ran for 80 performances. The cast included Carol Lawrence as Clio, Howard Keel as Clint, and Warde Donovan as Bart, with Virginia Capers, Odette Myrtil, Carol Brice, and Edith King in supporting roles. Nat Horne was a featured dancer in the production.

Critics were impressed by the elaborate sets (which included a turntable and fifteen different locales) and the more than two hundred costumes created by Cecil Beaton, who won the Tony Award for Best Costume Design and was nominated for Best Scenic Design. The leads drew good notices, but most agreed that DaCosta's book and direction resulted in a slow-moving, uninvolving production. The main characters were unlikeable, their romance dull, and too many peripheral characters wandered in and out of the action. Show Boat, with its riverboat setting, had been a natural for musical adaptation, and whereas Oscar Hammerstein II and Jerome Kern had succeeded in compressing the epic into a lively stage production, the creative team behind Saratoga was unable to wring much excitement from a romantic relationship stemming primarily from a mutual desire for vengeance.

== Songs ==
Act I

- I'll Be Respectable
- One Step-Two Step
- Gettin' a Man
- Petticoat High
- Why Fight This?
- Game of Poker
- Love Held Lightly
- Game of Poker (Reprise)
- The Gamblers
- Saratoga
- The Gossip Song
- Countin' Our Chickens
- You or No One

Act II

- The Cure
- The Men Who Run the Country
- The Man in My Life
- The Polka
- Love Held Lightly (Reprise)
- Goose Never Be a Peacock
- Dog Eat Dog
- The Railroad Fight
- Petticoat High (Reprise)
