= American Beauty (Ferber novel) =

1931 novel by Edna Ferber

- First edition
- Author: Edna Ferber
- Language: English
- Publisher: Doubleday Doran
- Publication date: 1931
- Media type: Print

American Beauty is a 1931 novel by American author Edna Ferber first published by Doubleday Doran. Set in the Housatonic region of Connecticut, the story, spanning from the year 1700 to 1930, relates the steady decline of the Oakes family and their property, as well as their tense relations with Polish immigrants.

The title comes from a line within the book. According to the story, Christopher Wren, who helped design the Oakes family mansion, said Connecticut has "a kind of American beauty," resembling Kent but possessing larger and higher landscapes.

== Plot ==
True Baldwin, a millionaire unnerved by the stock market crash of 1929, is advised to return to the Connecticut farm of his youth in order to buy land to till for his health. After discovering that his childhood home became owned by Polish immigrants, he and his daughter Candace, an architect, find what she calls "the most beautiful house in America." True says it is the home of the Oakes family, built by Captain Orrange Oakes in the early 18th century.

The house and the land are passed along from generation to generation and are eventually inherited by Judith Oakes. Through time, the mansion, the property and the family have degenerated. Following the death of her mother, Judith's niece Tamar Pring arrives at the Oakes home. Temmie's wily personality and vigor resemble that of her namesake, Tamar Oakes, the daughter of Captain Oakes. Finding the house in a state of disarray, Temmie assumes the responsibility of cleaning it while Judith seems incapable of helping her with household chores. Temmie takes on the name of Oakes and eventually marries Ondia Olszak, a Polish immigrant who works on her family's tobacco farm.

By the time True and Candace arrive, Orrange Olszak, Temmie's son, operates what is left of the farm. However, he is being forced to sell it because of the greed of his half brother and sister.

== Characters ==
- Judith Oakes is a bitter, unmarried woman who stubbornly upholds the value of the Oakes family name. She sees the wiliness of her niece Tamar as a threat to her family's prestige. Faced with declining finances, she refuses to sell any portion of her property to immigrants, even though neighbouring farms are met with some success. Left an invalid after suffering a stroke, she dies from the shock of Temmie's marriage.
- Tamar "Temmie" Oakes is the niece of Judith Oakes. She grew up with her mother in a traveling circus. After her mother's death, she moves in with Judith and eventually falls in love with and marries Ondi Olszak. Her passionate love for her family's heritage and land, brought on by the stories her mother told her while she was a little girl, is her driving force throughout her life.
- Jotham Oakes, a dwarf and a simpleton, is Judith Oakes' brother. He is emotionally attached to his sister and, although usually jovial, is prone to periods of melancholy.
- Ondia "Ondi" Olszak is a Polish immigrant who works on the Oakes farm and hopes one day to purchase a portion of it.
- Polcia Olszak is Ondi's wife who joins him later in America with their young son, Stas. Their marriage is not a happy one. She dies giving birth to her daughter Rozia.
- Stas Olszak is Ondi and Polcia Olszak's son. As he grows older, he becomes increasingly dissatisfied with life at the farm and later leaves to work in a hat factory.
- Rozia Olszak is the illegitimate daughter of Polcia Olszak and is legally adopted by Temmie and Ondi after their marriage. Like Stas, she leaves the farm and later marries a well-to-do widower.
- Big Bella is a descendant of the Champions, a family historically friendly with the Oakes. Judith Oakes tolerates her simply for their families' bond. She is an obese drunkard and is also known for her knowledge of herbs. She befriends Temmie and aids her in planning her wedding.
- Orrange Olszak is the son of Temmie Oakes and Ondi Olszak. Although his name is legally "Orrange Olszak," Temmie refers to him as an Oakes and almost considers him to be a reincarnation of Captain Oakes. He inherits his mother's love for the Oakes' heritage and has many plans for modernizing the farm to make it profitable.
- True Baldwin is a millionaire who knew the Oakes growing up. He was infatuated with Judith Oakes, but left Connecticut without telling her. He considers buying the Oakes farm from its current owner, Orrange Oakes.
- Candace Baldwin, an architect, is the daughter of True Baldwin. At 26, she is chic, self-assured, and unmarried, looking for someone to "hit her over the head" before she does.
- Captain Orrange Oakes, having bought Connecticut land from local natives, organizes the construction of the Oakes family mansion.
- Tamar Oakes is the young daughter of Captain Orrange Oakes. She possesses a spritely spirit and is fascinated by the natives who frequently visit the Oakes mansion.
