= Saratoga Trunk (novel) =

Novel by Edna Ferber

- First edition
- Author: Edna Ferber
- Language: English
- Publisher: Doubleday, Doran
- Publication date: 1941
- Publication place: United States
- Media type: Print (Hardcover)
- Pages: 352 pp

Saratoga Trunk is a best-selling novel by American author Edna Ferber, originally published by Doubleday, Doran in 1941.

It concerns a notorious Creole woman, Clio Dulaine, who returns to her native New Orleans and marries a Texas gambler, Colonel Clint Maroon.

The book serves as the basis for the 1945 film, Saratoga Trunk, and the 1959 stage musical, Saratoga, and was published as an Armed Services Edition during WWII.

== Plot ==
In 1875, Clio Dulaine, the illegitimate daughter of an aristocratic New Orleans French Creole father and a light-skinned Creole woman of color who was his placée, returns from Paris to her birthplace in Rampart Street to avenge her mother's mistreatment at the hands of her father's family, the Dulaines. Years ago, Clio's mother, Rita Dulaine, accidentally killed her husband, Nicholas Dulaine, when he tried to prevent her from committing suicide, and the scandalized Dulaines then exiled Clio and her mother to Paris. Clio is accompanied by her maid, Angélique Pluton, and her dwarf manservant, Cupidon.

After fixing up the rundown house in Rampart Street, Clio ventures out, hoping to encounter the Dulaines: her father's widow, the widow's mother, and the widow's daughter (and Clio's half-sister) Charlotte Thérèse. At the French marketplace, Clio stops to sample jambalaya and is immediately attracted to Clint Maroon, a tall Texan in a white hat, who is eating at the counter. The attraction is mutual, and Clint offers to drive Clio to the cathedral in his carriage, but a disapproving Angélique interferes, and Clio leaves without him. After the service, Clio, Angelique, and Cupidon eat breakfast at Begue's, the restaurant patronized by the Dulaines every Sunday. While eating, Angélique spots the Dulaines walking in, but they recognize Clio and leave quickly. Later Clint and Clio meet again at the restaurant, and afterward he drives her home.

Clio and Clint begin a courtship. Eventually, Clint moves into Clio's house. Although they are in love with each other, Clio, who is obsessed with her plans for revenge, intends to marry a rich and powerful man to prove that she is as good as her father's family. Clint, a gambler, who intends never to marry, is out for revenge against the railroad owners who ruined his rancher father in Texas.

Clio continues to embarrass the Dulaines at every opportunity, planning, if necessary, to sabotage the society debut of her half-sister Charlotte Thérèse. Exasperated by Clio's unrelenting machinations, Clint leaves for Saratoga Springs, New York. To put an end to Clio's scheming, the Dulaines pay her $10,000 and agree to destroy the Rampart Street house and bury her mother in a New Orleans cemetery. Later, Clio joins Clint in Saratoga Springs, where she plots to marry wealthy railroad heir Bartholomew Van Steed. Clio's arrival with Angelique and Cupidon causes quite a stir, and because the hotel is completely booked, Clint offers Clio, who assumes the identity of a mourning Mrs. De Chanfret, two of the rooms in his suite. Privately, he explains that Bart owns a railroad, the Saratoga Trunk, which has increased in value to millions of dollars because it connects the Pennsylvania coal country with New York.

Railroad developer Raymond Soule, who ruined Clint's father in Texas years ago, is trying to steal the railroad from Bart. Clio poses as the widow of a French count, a claim that many doubt until she is unexpectedly backed up by socialite Mrs. Coventry Bellop, who intensely dislikes Van Steed's mother. Clio's beauty and melodramatic posturing quickly capture Bart's attentions.

Meanwhile, Clint offers to save the Saratoga Trunk from Soule in exchange for shares in the railroad. When Clio learns that Bart is paying Clint to do his dirty work, she hysterically accuses him of cowardice and sends him away. This excites Bart, who explains that he knows about her background, but wants to marry her anyway. The costume ball that evening is interrupted by the arrival of Clint and Cupidon, who were seriously wounded during a pitched battle with Soule's men. Clio realizes that she loves Clint too much to marry another man and nurses him back to health. Clint then tells Clio that, having saved the Saratoga Trunk from Soule, his railroad shares have made him a very rich man, and he plans to eventually take over the trunk line himself from Van Steed.
