= Saratoga Trunk =

1945 film by Sam Wood

- Theatrical release poster
- Directed by: Sam Wood
- Screenplay by: Casey Robinson
- Based on: Saratoga Trunk; 1941 novel by Edna Ferber
- Produced by: Hal B. Wallis
- Starring: Gary Cooper; Ingrid Bergman
- Cinematography: Ernest Haller
- Edited by: Ralph Dawson
- Music by: Max Steiner
- Color process: Black and white
- Production company: Warner Bros. Pictures
- Distributed by: Warner Bros. Pictures
- Release dates: November 21, 1945 (New York City); March 30, 1946 (US)
- Running time: 135 minutes
- Country: United States
- Language: English
- Budget: $2,393,000
- Box office: $7,801,000

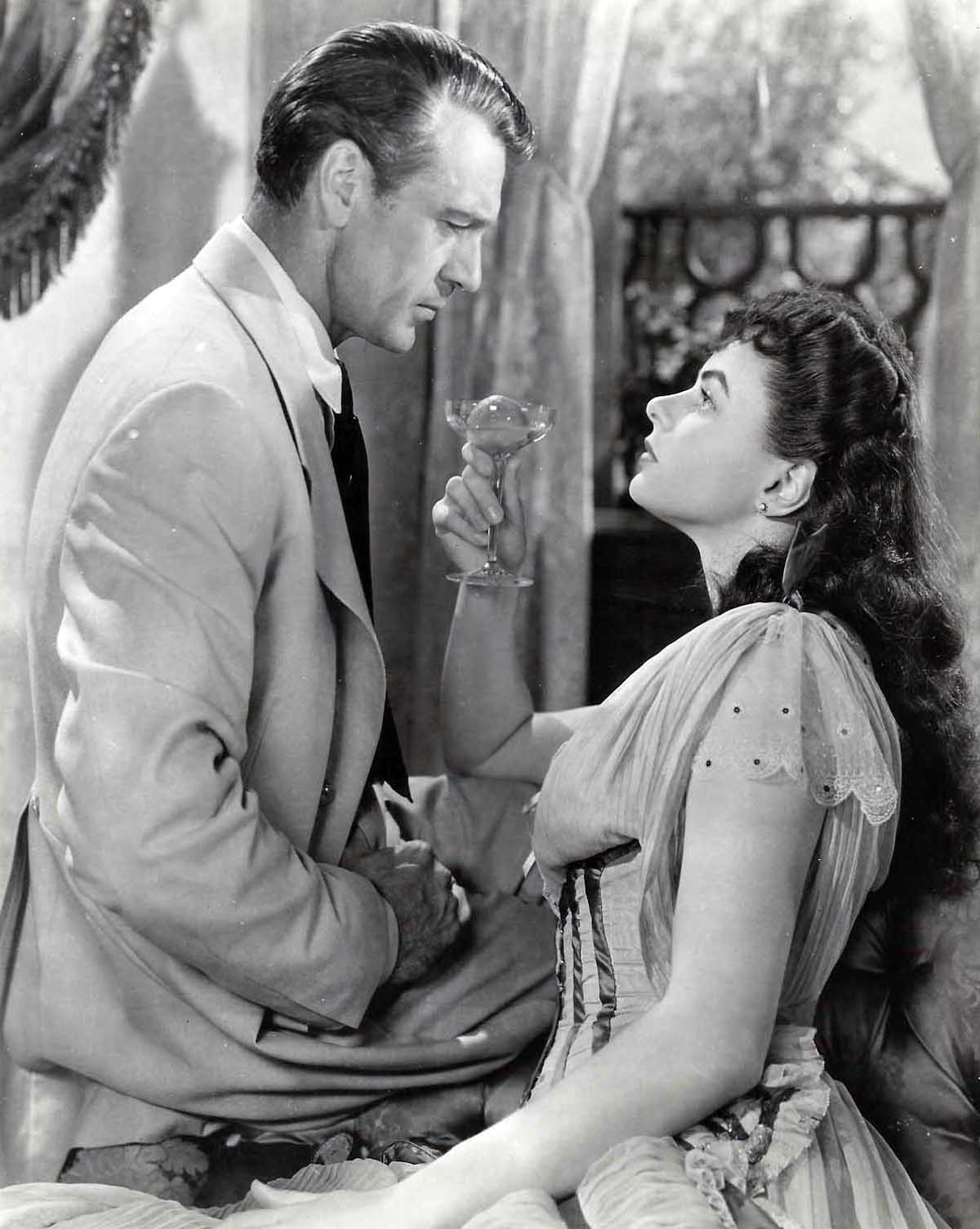
Gary Cooper and Ingrid Bergman

Saratoga Trunk is a 1945 American historical romance film, directed by Sam Wood and starring Gary Cooper, Ingrid Bergman, and Flora Robson. Written by Casey Robinson, based on the 1941 novel Saratoga Trunk by Edna Ferber, the film is set in New Orleans and the upstate New York resort of Saratoga Springs. It follows the relationship of two characters with no social position because their parents suffered injustice. They seek to settle scores while romantically involved with one another. He is a Texas gambler. She is the daughter of an affair between a Creole aristocrat and his mistress. The title of the film has a dual meaning, referring to both a railroad line and model of luggage favored by elegant travelers.

== Plot ==
New Orleans, 1875. Clio Dulaine returns, plotting revenge for her mother Rita, who had been mistress to a member of the Dulaine family. After he illicitly fathered Clio and his family forced him to marry a woman of his own class, Rita tried to shoot herself. He intervened and was fatally shot himself, and she was accused of murdering him. His family packed her off to Paris to hush up the scandal.

Clio has two devoted allies—her maid, Angelique, and a dwarf servant, Cupidon. They restore her mansion on Rampart Street and she assumes the name "Comtesse de Chanfrais". Clio plans to shame the Dulaines and marry a rich man, but Angelique says Clio is like her mother, grandmother and great-grandmother, who were all fools for love: "They always hope, ladies like her, but never so..."

At the market on a Sunday morning, Clio falls in love at first sight with a tall Texan gambler, Clint Maroon. A furious Angelique whisks Clio away, but they soon meet at Begue's, a famous restaurant, where Clio takes the Dulaine family's regular table. The Dulaines recognize her and flee, as Clio invites Clint to join her at her table.

At the house, Clint mistakes her for a prostitute. She slams the door on him. He haunts the house for weeks. Angelique intercepts his letter of apology. At last, when Clio goes to church, he kneels beside her. They reconcile and become lovers. Clint has no interest in marriage, even with the girl back home who embroidered his neckties. He promises Angelique that he won't interfere with Clio's plans to spite the Dulaines by marrying into wealth and social status, because he wants Clio to be happy, but when she proposes opening a gambling house, he moves east to Saratoga. Clio's obsession with revenge keeps her in New Orleans.

Clio's efforts to embarrass the Dulaines achieve a measure of success. If Clio leaves New Orleans and gives up the name Dulaine, they will pay her $10,000 and bring her mother's body to New Orleans for burial as "Rita Dulaine, loving wife".

Clint writes that the resort is "crawling with...respectable millionaires." When Clio arrives, railroad heir Bartholomew Van Steed is at the station: Clio sent a telegram in his mother's name. At the hotel, "Colonel Maroon" offers part of his suite to the Comtesse. Clint watches with amusement as Clio conquers the resort and Van Steed, with help from Sophie Bellop. Clio confesses to Sophie that she is desperate for the respectability and security money can bring. Van Steed's mother arrives, but Sophie foils her.

Van Steed is enchanted, but he has business problems. In his effort to monopolize railroads, Tycoon Raymond Soule, who destroyed Clint's father, has hired an army of goons to take over Van Steed's Saratoga trunk line by force. Clint makes the Saratoga shareholders an offer. In exchange for shares in the railroad, he will import a gang of men who are eager to get back at the tycoon who stole their land.

Clint goes to Albany, where Cupidon secretly boards the train. They take back the railroad, station by station. However, Soule sends a train from the end of the line in Binghamton. They crash head on. In the battle that follows, Cupidon is injured protecting Clint.

At Saratoga Springs, Clio dresses for the costume ball. Fearing for Cupidon's welfare, Angelique tells her about the plan. Clio accuses Bart of cowardice. He calmly proposes. He knows everything. He uses his mother. He gets what he wants, and he wants Clio. At the ball, men are talking about the success of the battle. Clio is distraught. Clint staggers in, carrying Cupidon, and collapses when Clio hugs him.

Clio is weeping at Clint's bedside, struggling with a piece of embroidery. He pretends to be delirious, speaking to another girl. Clio protests that she has changed, she is like her mother. She loves him. "Rich and respectable, that's me," he moans. When she says "I'll let you wear the pants", he declares, "Honey, that's all I wanted to know!" They laugh and kiss, and Angelique drags a laughing Cupidon away from the keyhole.

== Cast ==
- Gary Cooper as Colonel Clint Maroon
- Ingrid Bergman as Clio Dulaine
- Flora Robson as Angelique Buiton
- Jerry Austin as Cupidon
- John Warburton as Bartholomew Van Steed
- Florence Bates as Sophie Bellop
- Curt Bois as Augustin Haussy
- John Abbott as Roscoe Bean
- Ethel Griffies as Clarissa Van Steed
- Louis Payne as Raymond Soule (uncredited)
- Lillian Yarbo as Hotel Maid (uncredited)

== Production notes ==
Ethel Waters and Lena Horne were both considered for the role of Angelique, the Haitian maid. Instead of a woman of color, Warner Bros. Pictures cast British actress Flora Robson. Shot in 1943, the film was not released until 1945.

== Reception ==
=== Box office ===
The film was Warner Bros.' most popular movie of 1946. According to Warner Bros. records, it earned rentals of $5,148,000 in the U.S. and $2,653,000 elsewhere. According to Variety, the film earned $4,250,000 in theatrical rentals through its North American release.

== Accolades ==
At the 19th Academy Awards, Flora Robson was nominated for Best Supporting Actress.
