= Stage Door (play) =

1936 comedic stage play

- Written by: Edna Ferber; George S. Kaufman
- Original language: English
- Genre: Comedy

Premiere
- Date premiered: October 22, 1936
- Place premiered: Music Box Theatre; New York City

Stage Door is a 1936 stage play by Edna Ferber and George S. Kaufman about a group of struggling actresses who room at the Footlights Club, a fictitious theatrical boardinghouse in New York City modeled after the real-life Rehearsal Club. The three-act comedy opened on Broadway on October 22, 1936, at the Music Box Theatre and ran for 169 performances. The play was adapted into the 1937 film of the same name, and was also adapted for television.

== Production history ==
By 1935, Ferber and Kaufman had already collaborated on two successful Broadway plays, The Royal Family (1927) and Dinner at Eight (1932). On New Year's Eve of 1935, the team met to discuss potential projects, and Ferber revived one of their old ideas: to write a play with an all-female cast. Inspired by a visit to the Rehearsal Club, she also suggested that the play be set in a theatrical boardinghouse for young actresses, with "a retired character actress" serving as the landlady. In early 1936, Ferber and Kaufman developed a detailed synopsis for Stage Door while visiting the Florida home of producer Sam H. Harris; some details of the plot were hashed out while the duo rode bicycles side by side. After they returned to New York, the script was written in two months, with the pair "work[ing] for four hours daily in Miss Ferber's apartment, generally from 11 o'clock in the morning until 3 o'clock in the afternoon".

The three-act comedy opened on Broadway on October 22, 1936, at the Music Box Theatre with a cast that included Tom Ewell as Larry Westcott, Lee Patrick as Judith Canfield, Margaret Sullavan as Terry Randall, and Mary Wickes as Mary McCune. Sullavan had left New York for Hollywood in 1933, and Stage Door marked her first stage appearance since becoming a movie star. Stage Door was a critical and commercial success, closing in March 1937 after 169 performances. The play would likely have run longer had Sullavan not become pregnant and withdrawn from the production; according to Kaufman biographer Scott Meredith, Sullavan "was so identified with the role that Harris and Kaufman did not think the play would draw without her, and closed it." Ferber was disappointed by the closure and privately referred to Sullavan as "a miserable little double-crossing wench."

Joan Bennett played Terry Randall in the 1936 national tour of Stage Door, and Glenda Farrell took on the role in a 1943 Chicago production. The play has never been revived on Broadway.

== Adaptations ==
In November 1936, RKO Pictures bought the film rights to Stage Door for "something over $125,000," intending the property as a vehicle for Katharine Hepburn, Burgess Meredith, and Ginger Rogers. Hepburn and Rogers did indeed appear in the 1937 film adaptation, which was heavily improvised and bore only a superficial resemblance to the original play, prompting Kaufman to quip, "They should have called it Screen Door."

On April 6, 1955, a one-hour television adaptation aired on CBS as part of The Best of Broadway anthology series. Adapted by Gore Vidal and directed by Sidney Lumet, the live broadcast featured Diana Lynn as Terry Randall and Elsa Lanchester as the landlady.

In 1981, The New York Times reported that a musical based on Stage Door, with music by Dan Goggin and lyrics by Robert Lorick, was set to open on Broadway that fall, but the production never materialized.
