= Personality Plus =

1914 novel by Edna Ferber

- 1st edition (publ. Grosset & Dunlap)
- Author: Edna Ferber
- Language: English
- Publication date: 1914

Personality Plus is an early novel by American author Edna Ferber. Originally published in 1914, Personality Plus is the second of three volumes chronicling the travels and events in the life of Emma McChesney. Ferber achieved her first successes with a series of stories centering on this character, a stylish and intelligent divorced mother who rises rapidly in business.

== Sources ==
- Personality Plus at Project Gutenberg
