= Spurgeon Tucker =

American painter

- Born: November 2, 1894; Toronto, Canada
- Died: June 5, 1968 (aged 73); New York City
- Known for: Lithographer

Spurgeon Tucker (November 2, 1894 – June 5, 1968) was an accomplished 20th-century American painter and successful lithographer. He was primarily known for his portraits of Hollywood celebrities, but many would contend that his finest works were of the things he loved most: his family, everyday items from his Long Island home and quiet countryside scenes.

He received acclaim in the 1950s after several exhibitions, including a showing at the Smithsonian, but chose to protect his amateur status and to keep the paintings in his family. Many of his paintings are unsigned.

== Personal life ==
Tucker was born to Bertha Hampton and William Tucker in Toronto, Canada, on November 2, 1894, and was the second of three sons. He joined the Royal Canadian Air Force and became a pilot and an officer but World War I ended before he was due to be sent to Europe.

He moved to New York City and began working for Daniel Petigor, a lithographer. He later started his own lithography business, Spurgeon Tucker, Inc. The business was successful and he had Ford, Buick, White Rock Beverages, Chesterfield, Sunshine Biscuits, Bulova Watch and Borden Milk among his clients.

His first marriage, in 1924, was to Lavinia Adelaide Young. In 1935, he married Petigor's daughter, Adlyn, and they had two daughters. In 1938, Tucker’s eldest daughter, Patricia, was featured in the Borden Milk billboards as the “Borden Baby.” He raised his family in 1185 Park Avenue in New York City and in Bay Shore, Long Island. In addition to art, he was passionate about baseball and his garden on Long Island.

Tucker remained in New York City and enjoyed frequent trips to Long Island until his death from cancer in 1968.

== Exhibitions ==
Tucker was a member of the Salmagundi Club, and many of his works were exhibited at Salamagundi shows.

Tucker’s Geraniums was shown at The Smithsonian Institution, National Gallery of Art, Washington, D.C. as a part of the American Artists Professional League, American Art Week Exhibition in 1963.

Tucker also exhibited at several shows in the New York City area.

== Paintings ==
While mostly known for his celebrity portraits, the majority of Tucker’s paintings were quiet outdoor scenes, still lifes or family portraits. He often took day trips to the Catskill Mountains, Maine, or up and down Long Island and often pulled over to the side of the road when he saw a setting that moved him.

He also painted many objects from his Long Island home, and portraits of his family at home and on vacations. Some of the items from the still lifes and the clothes from the portraits have been saved with the paintings.

== Celebrity portraits ==
Spurgeon Tucker’s celebrity portraits include

- Anne Jeffries (as Kate, in Kiss Me Kate), 1950
- Uta Hagen as Saint Joan (painting was reproduced on the cover of the large program during her Broadway run, and on the cover of the New York Times Sunday Magazine), 1951
- Dean Martin and Jerry Lewis to benefit the New York Heart Cardiac Fund, 1952
- Diana Barrymore (painting was reproduced on the book jacket of her book Too Much Too Soon and was displayed at the Museum of the City of New York), 1957
- B. D. Hyman, Bette Davis's daughter, age 6 (BD mentions sitting for the portrait in her book, My Mother's Keeper)
- Hetty Green (painted posthumously for the play Put Them All Together, starring Fay Bainter and Kay Medford, was over the mantle on the set, and during the curtain calls where the painting took a bow) 1963
- Carlos Montelban
- Clare Boothe Luce (as Kate in The Taming of the Shrew)
- Danton Walker, the Daily News Broadway columnist
- Ethel Thorson

== Books ==
- Barrymore, Diana and Frank, Gerold. Too Much, Too Soon. New York: Holt (1957)
- Lewis, Arthur H. The Day They Shook the Plum Tree. New York: Harcourt Brace (1963)
- Hyman, B.D., My Mother's Keeper. New York: William Morrow & Co(1985)
