= The Expert (1932 film) =

1932 film

- Directed by: Archie Mayo
- Written by: Julien Josephson; Maude T. Howell
- Based on: play Minick by Edna Ferber and George S. Kaufman, taken from Ferber's short story Old Man Minick
- Starring: Chic Sale; Dickie Moore
- Cinematography: Robert Kurrle; Al Green; John Shepek
- Edited by: James Gibbon
- Music by: Leo F. Forbstein
- Production company: Warner Bros. Pictures
- Distributed by: Warner Bros. Pictures; Vitaphone
- Release date: March 5, 1932
- Running time: 8 reels
- Country: USA
- Language: English

The Expert is a 1932 American pre-Code comedy-drama directed by Archie Mayo and starring Chic Sale and Dickie Moore. It is based on a 1924 Edna Ferber and George S. Kaufman play, Minick, which is based on the short story "Old Man Minick" by Ferber. The film was produced and distributed by Warner Bros. Pictures.

The Library of Congress holds a print.

== Cast ==
- Chic Sale - Grandpa John T. Minick
- Dickie Moore - Dickie
- Lois Wilson - Nettie Minick
- Ralf Harolde - Jim Crowley
- Adrienne Dore - Sadie Crowley
- Earle Foxe - Fred Minick
- Noel Francis - Daisy
- Elizabeth Patterson - Miss Crackenwald
- Dorothea Wolbert - Annie
- Charles E. Evans - Hard of Hearing Grant Resident
- Louise Beavers - Lulu
- Walter Catlett - Al
- May Boley - Mrs. Smallbridge
- Ben Holmes - Price
- William Robyns - Briggs
- Zita Moulton - Miss Lippencott
- Elsa Peterson - Miss Stack
- Adolph Leonard -

== Reception ==
A 1932 review in TIME Magazine described the film as "a profligate adaptation of Edna Ferber's story Old Man Minick." According to a 1932 review in The New York Times, "The story of Old Man Minick's misadventures when he comes to live with his son in Chicago is told in a halting, disjointed script which seems never quite sure where it is going. By trying to tell too much of Edna Ferber's novel, the adapters have blurred the picture and made much of it unconvincing." International Photographer called the film "well worth seeing."
