= Diana Barrymore =

American actress (1921–1960)

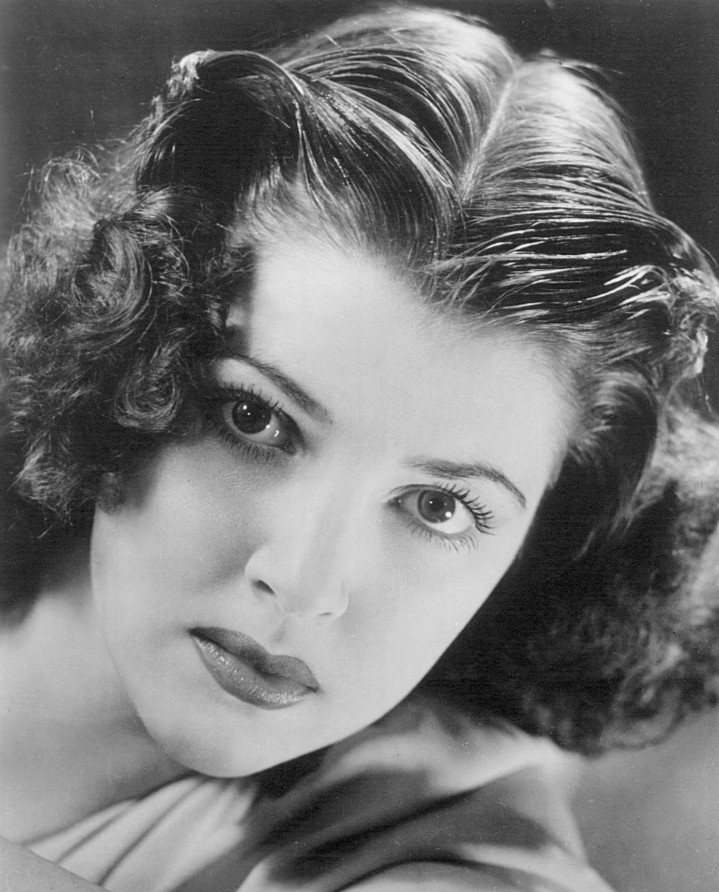
- Barrymore in 1942
- Born: Diana Blanche Barrymore Blythe; March 3, 1921; New York City, U.S.
- Died: January 25, 1960 (aged 38); New York City, U.S.
- Resting place: Woodlawn Cemetery, Bronx
- Education: American Academy of Dramatic Arts
- Occupations: Stage and film actress
- Years active: 1939–1959
- Spouses: Bramwell Fletcher (m. 1942; div. 1946) John Robert Howard II (m. 1947; div. 1948) Robert Wilcox (m. 1950; died 1955)
- Parent(s): John Barrymore; Blanche Oelrichs
- Relatives: John Drew Barrymore (half-brother)
- Family: Barrymore family Drew family

Diana Blanche Barrymore Blythe (March 3, 1921 – January 25, 1960) was an American film and stage actress. She was member of the prominent Barrymore-Drew acting family.

== Early life ==
Diana Blanche Barrymore Blythe was born March 3, 1921 in New York, New York. She was the daughter of actor John Barrymore and his second wife, poet Blanche Oelrichs, who wrote and performed as Michael Strange. Her parents divorced when she was four years old. She had two half-siblings from her father's second marriage to actress Delores Costello - a sister, Delores Ethel Mae Barrymore and brother John Drew Barrymore. She also had two half-brothers, Robin and Leonard, from her mother's first marriage.

Educated in Paris and New York City, Barrymore had little contact with her father. While in her teens, Barrymore decided to study acting and enrolled at the American Academy of Dramatic Arts.

== Life and career ==
Because of the prominence of the Barrymore name in the world of theatre, her move onto the stage began with much publicity including a 1939 cover of Life magazine. At age 19, she made her Broadway debut in Romantic Mr. Dickens. Brooks Atkinson, of The New York Times, wrote that Barrymore was "a vibrant young lady with an excellent speaking voice. She gives a romantic performance that is surprisingly accomplished and that lifts the play out of the doldrums. This is the best Barrymore debut for some time." The following year, she would go on to appear in Zoe Atkin's adaption of Claude-André Puget's french comedic play The Happy Days. Barrymore received positive reviews for her role. This was as well as a performance in The Land Is Bright.

That year, she made her first appearance in movies with a small role in a Warner Bros. production. In 1942, she signed a contract with Universal Studios who capitalized on her Barrymore name with a major promotional campaign billing her as "1942's Most Sensational New Screen Personality." However, alcohol and drug problems soon emerged and negative publicity from major media sources dampened her prospects. After less than three years in Hollywood, and six significant film roles at Universal, Barrymore's personal problems ended her career.

In January 1945, Barrymore appeared in the original Broadway stage production of Rebecca, a play based on Daphne Du Maurier's novel. She portrayed Mrs. de Winter at the Ethel Barrymore Theatre (named for her aunt), alongside her husband Bramwell Fletcher and Florence Reed. This would be followed up with a run the original Broadway production of Agatha Christie's Hidden Horizons, the following year.

In 1949, she was offered her own television talk show titled The Diana Barrymore Show with CBS. This would have been the first talkshow in television history, predating Joe Franklin by two years. The show was prepared for broadcast, however Barrymore did not show up and the program was immediately canceled.

She made her return to New York in the off-broadway show The Ivory Branch in 1956. She co-starred alongside Muriel Rahn.

In 1957, she published her autobiography, Too Much, Too Soon, with help and encouragement from ghostwriter Gerold Frank, which included her portrait painted by Spurgeon Tucker. In July 1957, she promoted the book by appearing on Mike Wallace's TV show The Mike Wallace Interview. Her statements included: “At the moment, I don’t drink. I hope to be able, one day, in perhaps the near future [or] the very distant future, to be able to drink like a normal human being. That may never be possible.” The following year, Warner Bros. released a movie version of Too Much, Too Soon starring Dorothy Malone as Barrymore and Errol Flynn as her father. The film was not a success with critics or moviegoers.

From 1958 to 1959, Barrymore starred in a number Tennessee William's plays, including Cat on a Hot Tin Roof and A Streetcar Named Desire. She was possibly set to portray Princess Kosmonopolis in William's Sweet Bird of Youth, however she passed before it come to fruition.

== Personal life and death ==
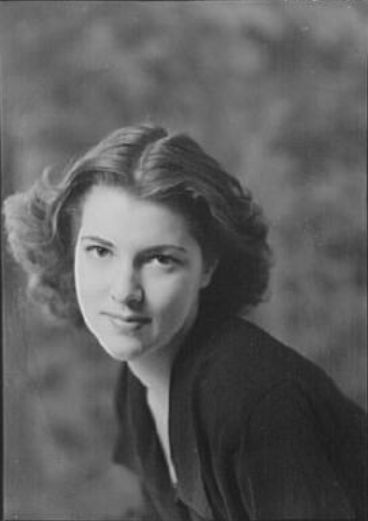
Diana Barrymore in 1941

Barrymore was married to, and divorced from, actor Bramwell Fletcher and tennis player John Howard. Her last marriage was to actor Robert Wilcox. The marriage to Wilcox ended in June 1955 when he died of a heart attack at the age of 45, while traveling by train.

Her father died in 1942 from cirrhosis of the liver after years of alcoholism and her brother Robin died in 1944 resulting from an overdose. Barrymore's life became a series of alcohol- and drug-related disasters marked by bouts of severe depression that resulted in several suicide attempts and extended sanitarium stays. She squandered her movie earnings and her inheritance from her father's estate, and when her mother died in 1950, Barrymore was left with virtually nothing from a once-vast family fortune. Actress Rosemary Prinz, who had co-starred with Barrymore in a production of Joan of Lorraine, stated that she would often arrive drunk.

In the early 1950s, she and her third husband toured Australia and upon returning to the United States, she expressed her dislike for the continent. After three bad marriages to addicted and sometimes abusive men, in 1955 Barrymore had herself hospitalized for nearly a full year of treatment.

Barrymore was found dead in her Manhattan apartment on January 25, 1960. Empty liquor bottles, tranquilizers, and sleeping pills were found near her bed. According to reports from the Barrymore's friends and the police, she had recently relapsed drinking around Christmas time. Her death has been attributed to a drug overdose, but her autopsy failed to find a cause of death and found no indication of overdose.

She is interred in the Woodlawn Cemetery in The Bronx, New York, next to her mother.

Following her death, her former step-mother Dolores Costello and sister Dolores Ethel Barrymore stated that Barrymore had been mistreated all her life. Costello said that "nobody cared" about Barrymore and she had not "come to us as a child, but as a beaten woman." This is believed to have contributed to her lifelong struggle with depression. Journalists noted that she had a habit of marrying when "she was down."

== Legacy ==
In 1958, Warner Bros. released a movie version of Too Much, Too Soon starring Dorothy Malone as Barrymore. The film was based on her autobiography of the same name. In 1995, the Tennessee Williams and New Orleans Literary Festival produced a production of Essee and Me and Tennessee. The play focused on Tennessee Williams friendship with Barrymore and was written by David Cuthbert.

== Filmography ==
=== Film ===
Year	Title	Role	Notes
1941	Manpower	Bit part	
1942	Eagle Squadron	Anne Partridge	
1942	Between Us Girls	Caroline Bishop	
1942	Nightmare	Leslie Stafford	
1943	Frontier Badmen	Claire	
1943	Fired Wife	Eve	
1944	Ladies Courageous	Nadine Shannon	
1944	The Adventures of Mark Twain	Undetermined role	Uncredited
1950	D.O.A.	Unconfirmed bit part	Uncredited
1951	The Mob	Bit part	Uncredited

=== Television ===
- The Ed Sullivan Show (1950?)
- The Mike Wallace Interview (1957)
- New York Noir: Entertainment Press Conference (1957)
- The Ben Hecht Show (1958)
- Irv Kupcinet Show (1959)

== Theatre ==
Year	Title	Role	Theater	Notes	Ref.
1940	Romantic Mr. Dickens	Carole Bronson	Playhouse Theatre, Broadway	Original Broadway Cast	
1941	Happy Days	Marianne Gassin	Henry Miller's Theatre, Broadway	Original Broadway Cast	
1941	The Land is Bright	Linda Kincaid	Music Box Theatre, Broadway	Original Broadway Cast	
1945	Rebecca	Mrs. de Winter	Ethel Barrymore Theatre, Broadway	Original Broadway Cast	
1946	Hidden Horizons	Jacqueline De Severac	Plymouth Theater, Broadway	Original Broadway Cast	
1947	Joan of Lorraine	Mary Grey / Joan of Arc	Tour		
1947	The Philadelphia Story	Dinah Lord		Kenley Players	
1949	Light Up The Sky			Kenley Players	
1955	A Streetcar Named Desire	Blanche		Kenley Players	
1956	The Ivory Branch		Provincetown Playhouse		
1958	Cat on a Hot Tin Roof	Maggie the Cat			
1958	A Streetcar Named Desire	Blanche			
1959	Something Unspoken		Civic Opera House, Chicago		
1959	Suddenly Last Summer	Catherine	Civic Opera House, Chicago		

== Bibliography ==
- Barrymore, Diana; Frank, Gerold (1957). Too Much, Too Soon. New York: Henry Holt & Co. ISBN 9780451014900.
- Too Fast, Too Short: The Life of Diana Barrymore (Hollywood Legends Series), Jennifer Ann Redmond. Mississippi: University Press of Mississippi (2025)

== See also ==
- List of unsolved deaths
