= The Mike Wallace Interview =

US television program 1957–1960

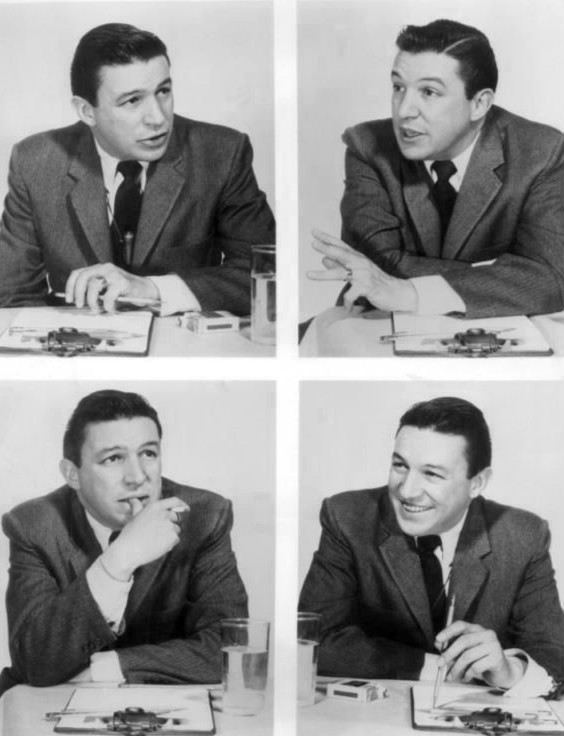
Wallace in a 1957 promotional photo for the show

The Mike Wallace Interview is a series of 30-minute television interviews conducted by host Mike Wallace. From April 28, 1957, to September 14, 1958, they were carried by the ABC American Broadcasting Company television network. In 1959–1960, they were offered by the NTA Film Network.

Before The Mike Wallace Interview was televised nationally on prime-time in 1957, Wallace had risen to prominence a year earlier with Night-Beat, a television interview program that aired in New York City.

== Name ==
Initial plans called for the program to be called Profiles. Wallace and ABC had tentatively decided to use that name, but they reconsidered after hearing from The New Yorker magazine. The New York Times reported that a letter from the magazine cordially "pointed out it had long run personality pieces under the heading of 'profiles'". Although the letter contained no threat if the name were to be used, Wallace and ABC decided to use another name.

== The Ransom Center Collection ==
In the early 1960s, Wallace donated kinescopes of these programs and related materials, including his prepared questions, research material, and correspondence, to the Ransom Center at The University of Texas at Austin.

On November 4, 2007, the School of Information at the University of Texas at Austin hosted online 65 of the interviews from 1957 to 1958. Sixty of the interviews in the Ransom Center's collection are kinescopes, 16mm recordings of the television programs made by filming the picture from a video monitor, with the remaining five on audio tape.

The 16mm films were transferred to video and, along with the audio tapes, subsequently digitized. The interviews were then transcribed and were embedded in the video files in the form of subtitles. Also included on the website are text files of the transcripts of each program.

The interviews hosted by The Ransom Center Collection include:

- Mortimer Adler, American philosopher and author
- Steve Allen, comedian, musician, and television personality
- Harry Ashmore, editor of the Arkansas Gazette in Little Rock and Pulitzer Prize winner
- Diana Barrymore, actress and daughter of actor John Barrymore
- Pearl Buck, Pulitzer- and Nobel Prize-winning novelist
- Bennett Cerf, publisher and co-founder of Random House
- Salvador Dalí, Spanish surrealist painter
- Kirk Douglas, American actor
- William O. Douglas, US Supreme Court Justice
- Bob Feller, baseball player
- Erich Fromm, psychoanalyst and social critic
- Oscar Hammerstein, Broadway lyricist
- Samuel David Hawkins, defector in the Korean War
- Robert Hutchins, educational philosopher, former dean of Yale Law School, former president and chancellor of The University of Chicago
- Aldous Huxley, author and social critic
- Henry Kissinger, expert on nuclear arms (later to become US Secretary of State under Richard M. Nixon)
- Reinhold Niebuhr, theologian
- Ayn Rand, American novelist
- Eleanor Roosevelt, wife of Franklin D. Roosevelt
- Leonard Ross, 12-year-old child prodigy, one of the most successful money-winners in quiz show history
- Margaret Sanger, leader of the birth control movement in America
- Jean Seberg, American actor
- Rod Serling, American screenwriter, well known for his television series The Twilight Zone
- Adlai Stevenson, former US presidential candidate
- Gloria Swanson, American film actress
- Peter Ustinov, actor, playwright, director, and novelist
- Frank Lloyd Wright, American architect
- Dagmar (American actress), real name Virginia Ruth Egnor, actor, model, and television personality.
- Drew Pearson American columnist.

== Syndication ==
In December 1957, ABC Film Syndication acquired 26 episodes of the series to distribute in Canada and Great Britain. The company also planned to dub those episodes in French, German, and Spanish for distribution in other countries.

== See also ==
- Profiles in Courage § Authorship
