= No Place to Go (1939 film) =

1939 film by Terry O. Morse

- Directed by: Terry O. Morse
- Screenplay by: Fred Niblo Jr. Lee Katz; Lawrence Kimble
- Produced by: Bryan Foy
- Starring: Dennis Morgan; Gloria Dickson; Fred Stone; Sonny Bupp; Aldrich Bowker; Charles Halton
- Cinematography: Arthur Edeson
- Edited by: Louis Lindsay; Benjamin Liss
- Music by: Heinz Roemheld
- Production company: Warner Bros. Pictures
- Distributed by: Warner Bros. Pictures
- Release date: September 23, 1939
- Running time: 56 minutes
- Country: United States
- Language: English

No Place to Go is a 1939 American drama film, directed by Terry O. Morse and written by Fred Niblo Jr., Lee Katz and Lawrence Kimble. It was adapted from the 1924 play, Minick, written by Edna Ferber and George S. Kaufman. The film stars Dennis Morgan, Gloria Dickson, Fred Stone, Sonny Bupp, Aldrich Bowker and Charles Halton. The film was released by Warner Bros. Pictures on September 23, 1939.

== Plot ==
Andrew Plummer is a former soldier and boxer happily living in a home for veterans. Joe, having recently gotten a promotion at work, feels guilty that his father is living there and invites him to come live with him and his wife, Trudie. He writes in his letter that he needs his father's help at his job, as he knows his father would consider his living there a bother if it was on a regular invitation. While he enjoys it there with his friends, Andrew leaves under the impression that his son needs him. And as there is a long waiting list at the veterans home, he would be unable to return for years.

Once at Joe and Trudie's house, his good-natured but intrusive personality starts to get on the housekeepers' nerves. Over time, his daughter-in-law is worn down by his erratic character. Andrew soon learns that Joe doesn't really need help, and now has a lot of time on his hands. While out on a walk he befriends Tommy, an orphan shoeshine boy who lives with his Uncle Frank. He also meets a group of elderly men in the park, who mention the Hays Home for Aged Gentlemen, where you pay $500 and they take care of you for life. Tommy casually mentions the stack of nearly one thousand dollars in Andrew's chest to his Uncle, who then plans to steal the money.

In the meantime, Andrew overhears Trudie talking to Joe about the embarrassment his father has been causing her in front of their friends. He then tells them about his decision to move into the Hays Home. When he goes to get his $500, however, it is missing. He confronts Tommy about it, and he says that he didn't do it. Andrew then gets his new friends from the Hays Home together to go to Uncle Frank and get the money back. In the end, Andrew and Tommy become members of the Hays Home.

== Cast ==
- Dennis Morgan as Joe Plummer
- Gloria Dickson as Gertrude "Trudie" Plummer
- Fred Stone as Andrew Plummer
- Sonny Bupp as Tommy
- Aldrich Bowker as Heffernan
- Charles Halton as Mr. Bradford
- Georgia Caine as Mrs. Bradford
- Frank Faylen as Pete Shafter
- Dennie Moore as Mrs. Harriet Shafter
- Al Bridge as Frank Crowley
- Joe Devlin as Spud
- Bernice Pilot as Birdie
- Greta Meyer as Hilda
- Christian Rub as Otto Schlemmer
- Wright Kramer as Banning
- Jimmy Conlin as Rivers
- Thomas Pogue as Oscar Lockwood
