= Minick =

1924 play by George S. Kaufman and Edna Ferber

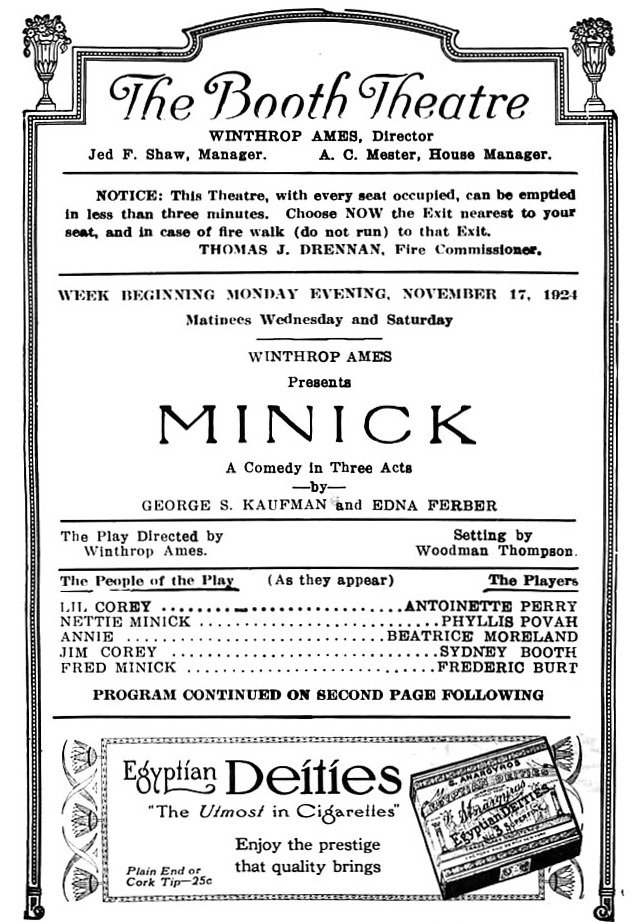
- Playbill for the Booth Theatre production
- Written by: Edna Ferber and George S. Kaufman
- Based on: "Old Man Minick" by Edna Ferber
- Original language: English
- Genre: Comedy
- Setting: Chicago

Premiere
- Date premiered: September 24, 1924
- Place premiered: Booth Theatre

Minick is a three-act Broadway play written by Edna Ferber and George S. Kaufman, based on Ferber's 1922 short story "Old Man Minick", that opened on September 24, 1924. Producer Winthrop Ames staged it at the Booth Theatre on Broadway, with O. P. Heggie in the title role. The play is about an elderly widower who comes to live with his son and daughter-in-law in their Chicago apartment.

== History ==
George S. Kaufman and Edna Ferber developed Ferber's short story "Old Man Minick" into the play Minick, which was initially produced by Winthrop Ames and opened on September 24, 1924.

Ames cast a Black actress, Emma Wise, to play the Minicks' maid, which was unusual at a time when most productions were racially segregated. Previews were held in three cities in Connecticut: New Haven, Hartford, and New London. In New London, a disused theater was reopened for the preview, which was interrupted by the emergence of hundreds of bats that had taken up residence in the building while it was closed.

== Cast and characters ==
The characters and opening night cast from the Broadway production are given below:

Opening night cast
Character	Broadway cast
Old Man Minick	O. P. Heggie
Fred Minick	Frederic Burt
Nettie Minick	Phyllis Povah
Jim Corey	Sydney Booth
Al Diamond	Ralph Bunker
Mr. Dietenhofer	Charles R. Burrows
Mrs. Lippincott	Jessie Graham
Marge Diamond	Myra Hampton
Miss Crackenwald	Mary Hubbard
Mr. Prince	Thomas Meegan
Annie	Beatrice Moreland
Lil Corey	Antoinette Perry
Mrs. Smallridge	Lavinia Shannon
Miss Stack	Ann Winslow
Lula	Emma Wise

== Reception ==
The play received positive reviews from critics. A 1924 review in Time said of Ferber and Kaufman, "they very nearly did a masterpiece. The play is amusing, deeply touching in spots, but overshoots the mark by a too tenacious realism." Stark Young wrote in a review for The New York Times, "The whole tone of the play is constantly funny, loving and tragic altogether. The long gap between the generations of these people, the lack of any idea that might bring them closer to each other: the barren mediocrity of their lives, their good intentions, their good hearts, their stupid interests, and most of all the dumbness of human beings toward each other no matter what they feel, these are the themes that are woven into the texture of the piece."

== Adaptations ==
Famous Players–Lasky adapted the play as a silent film in 1925 under the title Welcome Home, directed by James Cruze.

Warner Brothers did two sound film adaptations. In 1932, Archie Mayo directed The Expert, starring Chic Sale. In 1939, Terry O. Morse directed No Place to Go, starring Dennis Morgan.
