= Welcome Home (1925 film) =

1925 film by James Cruze

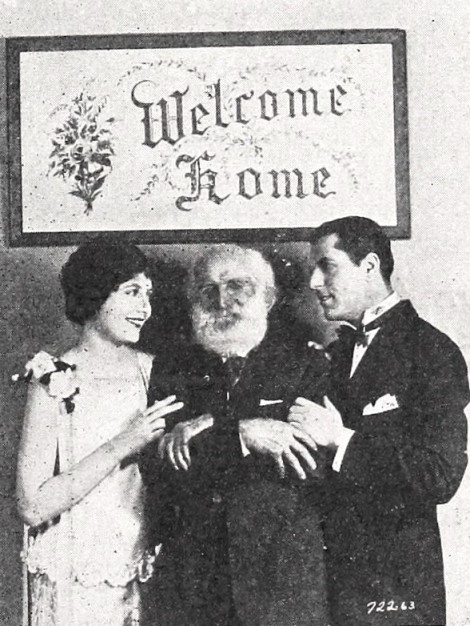
- Still with Wilson, Cosgrove, and Baxter
- Directed by: James Cruze
- Written by: Walter Woods (screenplay); F. McGrew Willis (screenplay)
- Based on: Minick by Edna Ferber and George S. Kaufman
- Produced by: Adolph Zukor; Jesse Lasky
- Starring: Lois Wilson; Warner Baxter
- Cinematography: Karl Brown
- Production company: Famous Players–Lasky
- Distributed by: Paramount Pictures
- Release date: May 17, 1925
- Running time: 6 reels
- Country: United States
- Language: Silent (English intertitles)

Welcome Home is a 1925 American silent comedy-drama film directed by James Cruze and starring Lois Wilson and Warner Baxter. It was produced by Famous Players–Lasky and distributed by Paramount Pictures. The film is based on the 1924 Broadway play Minick by Edna Ferber and George S. Kaufman.

== Plot ==
As described in a film magazine review, Old Man Prouty moves in with his son, inadvertently becoming a general nuisance by poking into affairs and disrupting plans for everyone. Upon discovering that his son must choose between him and his younger wife, he opts to reside at the Old Men's Home, where he finds companionship among other seniors.

== Cast ==
- Luke Cosgrove as Old Man Prouty
- Warner Baxter as Fred Prouty
- Lois Wilson as Nettie Prouty
- Ben Hendricks Sr. as Jim Corey
- Margaret Morris as Lil Corey
- Josephine Crowell as Miss Pringle
- Adele Watson as Annie
- James Finlayson (unknown role)

== Reception ==
In a 1925 review for The New York Times, Mordaunt Hall referred to the play Minick and wrote, "while this narrative in shadow form still possesses an inevitable undertone of sympathy, it misses fire in some important periods through an obvious fondness for exaggeration and a tendency to ignore opportunities for suspense or subtlety, which is surprising as this picture was directed by the able and versatile James Cruze." A 1925 review for Time Magazine noted "Significant character study is the hardest thing to find in the cinema," and stated "The subtleties of old age in the middle classes escaped even the directorial discernment of James Cruze."

== Preservation ==
A print of Welcome Home is preserved in the Library of Congress collection.
