= A Peculiar Treasure =

Autobiography by American author Edna Ferber

- First edition
- Author: Edna Ferber
- Language: English
- Subject: Autobiography
- Published: 1938
- Publisher: Doubleday, Doran, & Co.
- Publication place: United States
- Pages: 398

A Peculiar Treasure is an autobiography by American author Edna Ferber. The book was first published in 1938 by Doubleday, Doran, & Co. at 398 pages long. The book is Ferber's first autobiography.

It recounts her small-town, Midwest childhood, and her subsequent rise to authorship and the Pulitzer Prize. Her ascent from night-court reporter at a small-town newspaper to the author of So Big is set against the rising tensions in Europe and upsurging antisemitism in the US.
