= Edna Ferber =

American novelist and playwright (1885–1968)

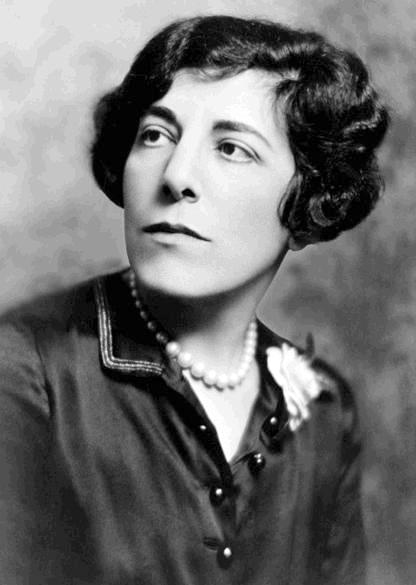
- Ferber in 1928
- Born: August 15, 1885; Kalamazoo, Michigan, U.S.
- Died: April 16, 1968 (aged 82); New York City, U.S.
- Education: Lawrence University
- Occupations: Novelist, playwright
- Writing career
- Genres: Drama, romance
- Notable awards: Pulitzer Prize for Fiction (1925)

Edna Ferber (August 15, 1885 – April 16, 1968) was an American novelist, short story writer and playwright. Her novels include the Pulitzer Prize-winning So Big (1924), Show Boat (1926; made into the celebrated 1927 musical), Cimarron (1930; adapted into the 1931 film which won the Academy Award for Best Picture), Giant (1952; made into the 1956 film of the same name) and Ice Palace (1958), which also received a film adaptation in 1960. She helped adapt her short story "Old Man Minick", published in 1922, into a play (Minick) and it was thrice adapted to film, in 1925 as the silent film Welcome Home, in 1932 as The Expert, and in 1939 as No Place to Go.

== Life and career ==
=== Early years ===
Ferber was born August 15, 1885, in Kalamazoo, Michigan, to a Hungarian-born Jewish storekeeper, Jacob Charles Ferber, and his Milwaukee, Wisconsin–born wife, Julia (Neumann) Ferber, who was of German Jewish descent. The Ferbers had moved to Kalamazoo from Chicago, Illinois, in order to open a dry goods store, and her older sister Fannie had been born there three years earlier. Ferber's father was not adept at business, and the family moved often during Ferber's childhood. From Kalamazoo, they returned to Chicago for a year, and then moved to Ottumwa, Iowa, where they resided from 1890 to 1897 (ages 5 to 12 for Ferber).

In Ottumwa, Ferber and her family faced brutal anti-Semitism, including adult males verbally abusing, mocking and spitting on her on days when she brought lunch to her father, often mocking her in a Yiddish accent. According to Ferber, her years in Ottumwa "must be held accountable for anything in me that is hostile toward the world". During this time, Ferber's father began to lose his eyesight, necessitating costly and ultimately unsuccessful treatments. At the age of 12, Ferber and her family moved to Appleton, Wisconsin, where she graduated from high school and later briefly attended Lawrence University.

=== Career ===
After graduation, Ferber planned to study elocution, with vague thoughts of someday becoming an actress, but her family could not afford to send her to college. On the spur of the moment, she took a job as a cub reporter at the Appleton Daily Crescent and subsequently moved to the Milwaukee Journal. In early 1909, Ferber suffered a bout of anemia and returned to Appleton to recuperate. She never resumed her career as a reporter, although she subsequently covered the 1920 Republican National Convention and 1920 Democratic National Convention for the United Press Association, and newspaper work was a theme in her first novel, Dawn O'Hara, The Girl Who Laughed, and the later Cimarron.

While Ferber was recovering, she began writing and selling short stories to various magazines, and in 1911 she published her first novel, Dawn O'Hara, The Girl Who Laughed. In 1912, a collection of her short stories was published in a volume titled Buttered Side Down. In her autobiography, Ferber wrote:

In that day, and for a girl in her early twenties, they were rather hard tough stories... The book got good reviews. I was startled and grimly pleased when some of the reviewers said that obviously these stories had been written by a man who had taken a feminine nom de plume as a hoax. I have always thought that a writing style should be impossible of sex determination; I don't think the reader should be able to say whether a book has been written by a man or a woman.

In 1925, she won the Pulitzer Prize for her book So Big. Ferber initially believed her draft of what would become So Big lacked a plot, glorified failure, and had a subtle theme that could easily be overlooked. When she sent the book to her usual publisher, Doubleday, she was surprised to learn that he greatly enjoyed the novel. This was reflected by the several hundreds of thousands of copies of the novel sold to the public. Following the award, the novel was made into a silent film starring Colleen Moore that same year. A remake followed in 1932, starring Barbara Stanwyck and George Brent, with Bette Davis in a supporting role. A 1953 version of So Big starring Jane Wyman is the most popular version to modern audiences.

Riding the popularity of So Big, Ferber's next novel, Show Boat in 1926, was just as successful. Shortly after its release, composer Jerome Kern proposed turning it into a musical. Ferber was shocked, thinking it would be transformed into a typical light entertainment of the 1920s. It was not until Kern explained that he and Oscar Hammerstein II wanted to create a different type of musical that Ferber granted him the rights and it premiered on Broadway in 1927, and it has been revived eight times.

Her 1952 novel Giant became the basis of the 1956 movie, starring Elizabeth Taylor, James Dean and Rock Hudson.

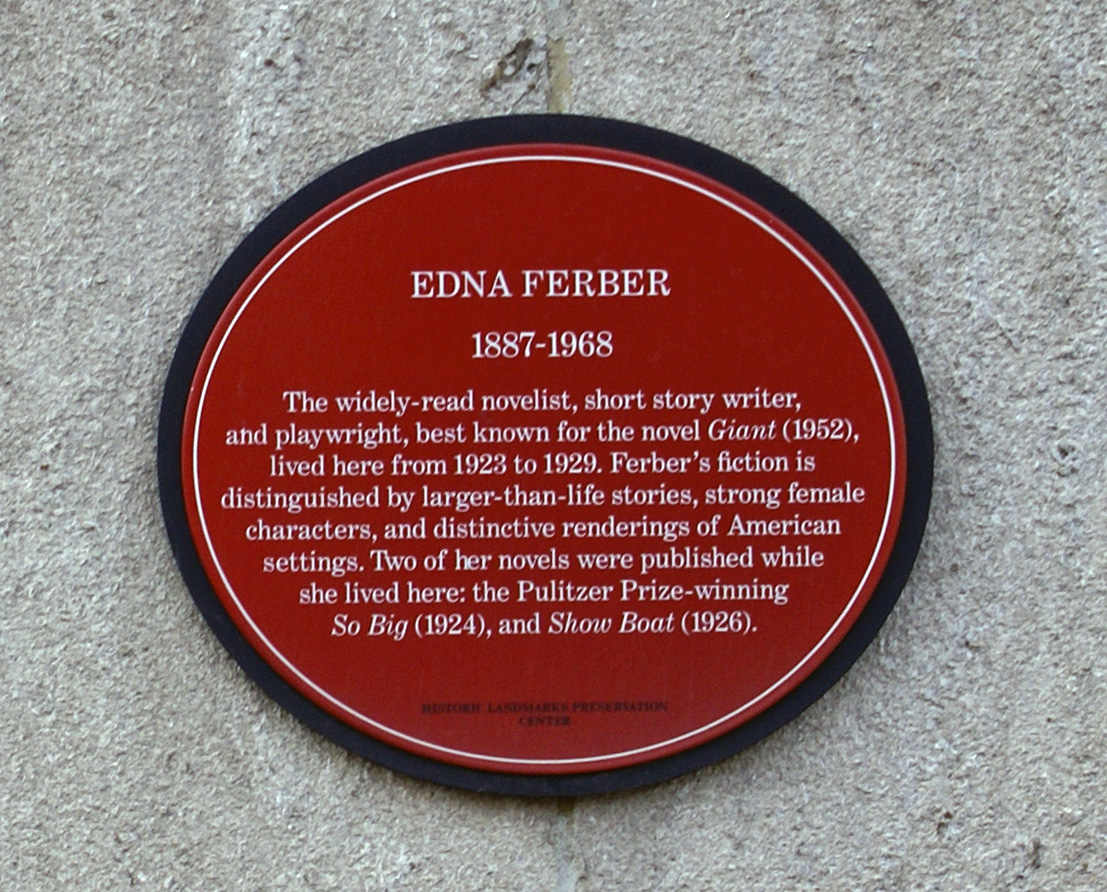
Plaque located in Manhattan, at 65th Street & Central Park West, in the building in which Edna Ferber lived for six years

Ferber was reportedly the first author to assign film rights to her books on short-term contracts so that the rights needed to be renegotiated regularly.

=== Death ===
Ferber died at her home in New York City, of stomach cancer, at the age of 82. She left her estate to her sister and nieces.

== Personal life ==
Ferber never married, had no children, and is not known to have engaged in a romance or sexual relationship. (Note: There have been undocumented rumors that Ferber was a lesbian. Professor John Unsworth makes an unsupported claim in John Sutherland (2007) Bestsellers: A Very Short Introduction Oxford University Press: 53. Haggerty and Zimmerman imply she was gay because of her visits to Provincetown in the early 20th century (Haggerty and Zimmerman (2000), Lesbian Histories and Cultures: An Encyclopedia, Taylor and Francis, p. 610). Porter (Porter, Darwin (2004) Katherine the Great, Blood Moon Productions, Ltd, p. 204) comments in passing that Ferber was a lesbian, but offers no support. Burrough (Burrough, Brian (2010) The Big Rich: The Rise and Fall of the Greatest Texas Oil Fortunes, Penguin) also remarks in passing that Ferber was gay, citing the biography written by Julie Goldsmith Gilbert (Ferber's great niece, see bibliography). Gilbert, however, makes no mention of lesbian relationships.) In her early novel Dawn O'Hara, the title character's aunt remarks, "Being an old maid was a great deal like death by drowning – a really delightful sensation when you ceased struggling." Ferber did take a maternal interest in the career of her niece Janet Fox, an actress who performed in the original Broadway casts of Ferber's plays Dinner at Eight (1932) and Stage Door (1936).

Ferber was known for being outspoken and having a quick wit. On one occasion, she led other Jewish guests in leaving a house party after learning the host was antisemitic. Once, after Noël Coward joked about how her suit made her resemble a man, she replied, "So does yours."

=== Importance of Jewish identity ===
Starting in 1922, Ferber began to visit Europe once or twice annually for thirteen or fourteen years. During this time and unlike most Americans, she became troubled by the rise of the Nazi Party and its spreading of the antisemitic prejudice she had faced in her childhood. She commented on this saying, "It was a fearful thing to see a continent – a civilization – crumbling before one's eyes. It was a rapid and seemingly inevitable process to which no one paid any particular attention." Her fears greatly influenced her work, which often featured themes of racial and cultural discrimination. Her 1938 autobiography, A Peculiar Treasure, originally included a spiteful dedication to Adolf Hitler which stated:

To Adolf Hitler, who has made me a better Jew and a more understanding human being, as he has of millions of other Jews, this book is dedicated in loathing and contempt.

While this was changed by the time of the book's publication, it still alluded to the Nazi threat. She frequently mentions Jewish success in her book, alluding to and wanting to show not just that Jewish success, but Jews being able to use that and prevail.

=== Algonquin Round Table ===
Ferber was a member of the Algonquin Round Table, a group of wits who met for lunch every day at the Algonquin Hotel in New York. Ferber and another member of the Round Table, Alexander Woollcott, were long-time enemies, their antipathy lasting until Woollcott's death in 1943, although Howard Teichmann states in his biography of Woollcott that their feud was due to a misunderstanding. According to Teichmann, Ferber once described Woollcott as "a New Jersey Nero who has mistaken his pinafore for a toga".

Ferber collaborated with Round Table member George S. Kaufman on several plays presented on Broadway: Minick (1924), The Royal Family (1927), Dinner At Eight (1932), The Land Is Bright (1941), Stage Door (1936), and Bravo! (1948).

=== Political views ===
In a poll carried out by the Saturday Review of Literature, asking American writers which presidential candidate they supported in the 1940 election, Ferber endorsed Franklin D. Roosevelt.

== Characteristics of works ==
Ferber's novels generally featured strong female protagonists, along with a rich and diverse collection of supporting characters. She usually highlighted at least one strong secondary character who faced discrimination, ethnic or otherwise.

Ferber's works often concerned small subsets of American culture, and sometimes took place in exotic locations she had visited but was not intimately familiar with, such as Texas or Alaska. She thus helped to highlight the diversity of American culture to those who did not have the opportunity to experience it. Some novels are set in places she had not visited.

== Legacy ==
- Ferber was portrayed by the actress Lili Taylor in the film Mrs. Parker and the Vicious Circle (1994).
- In 2008, The Library of America selected Ferber's article "Miss Ferber Views 'Vultures' at Trial" for inclusion in its two-century retrospective of American True Crime.
- On July 29, 2002, in her hometown of Appleton, Wisconsin, the U.S. Postal Service issued an 83¢ Distinguished Americans series postage stamp honoring her. Artist Mark Summers, well known for his scratchboard technique, created this portrait for the stamp referencing a black-and-white photograph of Ferber taken in 1927.
- A fictionalized version of Edna Ferber appears briefly as a character in Philipp Meyer's novel The Son (2013).
- Another fictionalized Edna Ferber, with herself as the protagonist, appears in a series of mystery novels by Ed Ifkovic, published by Poisoned Pen Press, including Downtown Strut: An Edna Ferber Mystery, written in 2013.
- In 2013, Ferber was inducted into the Chicago Literary Hall of Fame.
- In her hometown of Appleton, Wisconsin, the Edna Ferber Elementary School was named after her. Construction of the school was initially voted down in a 1971 referendum.

== List of works ==
Ferber wrote thirteen novels, two autobiographies, numerous short stories, and nine plays, many which were written in collaborations with other playwrights.

=== Novels ===
- Dawn O'Hara, The Girl Who Laughed (1911)
- Fanny Herself (1917)
- The Girls (1921)
- So Big (1924) (won Pulitzer Prize)
- Show Boat (1926, Grosset & Dunlap)
- Cimarron (1930)
- American Beauty (1931)
- Come and Get It (1935)
- Saratoga Trunk (1941)
- Great Son (1945)
- Giant (1952)
- Ice Palace (1958)

=== Novellas and short story collections ===
- Buttered Side Down (1912)
- Roast Beef, Medium (1913) Emma McChesney stories
- Personality Plus (1914) Emma McChesney stories
- Emma Mc Chesney and Co. (1915) Emma McChesney stories
- Cheerful – By Request (1918)
- Half Portions (1919)
- Gigolo (1922)
- Mother Knows Best (1927)
- They Brought Their Women (1933)
- Nobody's in Town: Two Short Novels (1938) Contains Nobody's in Town and Trees Die at the Top
- One Basket: Thirty-One Short Stories (1947) Includes No Room at the Inn: A Story of Christmas in the World Today

=== Autobiographies ===
- A Peculiar Treasure (1939)
- A Kind of Magic (1963)

=== Plays ===
- Our Mrs. McChesney (1915) (play, with George V. Hobart)
- $1200 a Year: A Comedy in Three Acts (1920) (play, with Newman Levy)
- Minick: A Play (1924) (play, with G. S. Kaufman), adapted from her short story "Old Man Minick"
- The Royal Family (1927) (play, with G. S. Kaufman)
- Dinner at Eight (1932) (play, with G. S. Kaufman)
- Stage Door (1936) (play, with G.S. Kaufman)
- The Land Is Bright (1941) (play, with G. S. Kaufman)
- Bravo! (1949) (play, with G. S. Kaufman)

=== Screenplays ===
- Saratoga Trunk (1945) (film, with Casey Robinson)

=== Musical adaptations ===
- Show Boat (1927) – music by Jerome Kern, lyrics and book by Oscar Hammerstein II, produced by Florenz Ziegfeld
- Saratoga (1959) – music by Harold Arlen, lyrics by Johnny Mercer, dramatized by Morton DaCosta
- Giant (2009) – music and lyrics by Michael John LaChiusa, book by Sybille Pearson
