= Judiciary of Oklahoma =

U.S. state judiciary

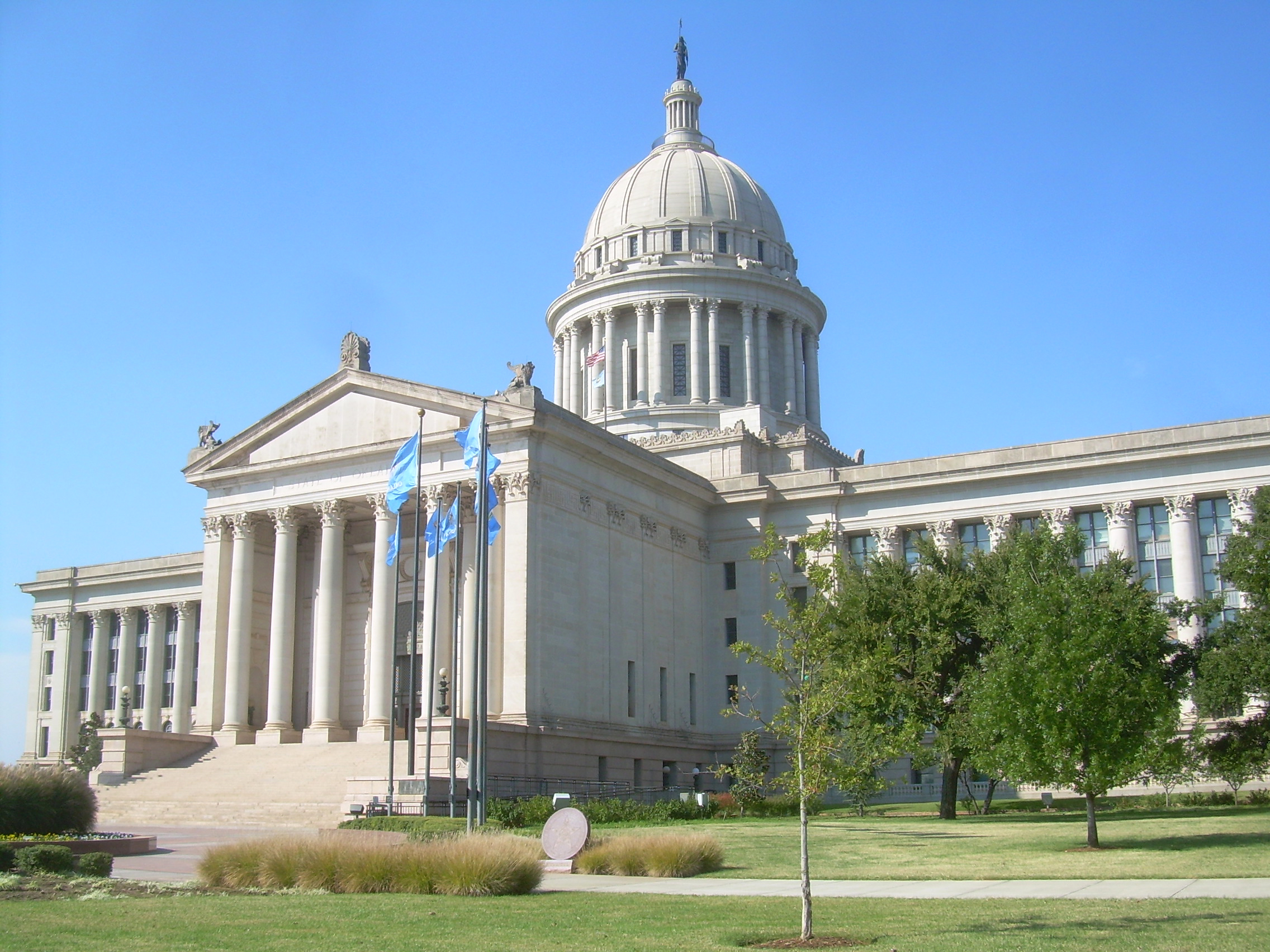
The Oklahoma Capitol in Oklahoma City was previously the home of the Oklahoma Supreme Court whose Chief Justice is concurrently the administrator-in-chief of the Oklahoma Court System.

The Oklahoma Court System is the judicial system for the U.S. state of Oklahoma. Based in Oklahoma City, the court system is a unified state court system that functions under the Chief Justice of Oklahoma who is its administrator-in-chief.

Under the judiciary, five types of courts function: Courts of Limited Jurisdiction, Courts of General Jurisdiction, an Immediate Appellate Court, Specials Courts, and Courts of Last Resort. Also, the Oklahoma judiciary contains two independent courts. The two Courts of Last Resort arrangement exists only in Oklahoma and neighboring Texas.

All judges and justices requiring appointment are appointed by the Governor of Oklahoma. Candidates must first go through a nominating process through the Oklahoma Judicial Nominating Commission, which selects three candidates to submit to the Governor for a single selection to the office.

== Administration ==
The Oklahoma Supreme Court is charged with the administration of the entire state court system. The court normally exercises this responsibility through the adoption of rules governing the court system and the behavior of attorneys in state courts. The chief justice is the figure in charge of these rules.

== Courts ==
Under the judiciary, five types of courts function: Courts of Limited Jurisdiction, Courts of General Jurisdiction, an Immediate Appellate Court, Specials Courts, and Courts of Last Resort. Also, the Oklahoma judiciary contains two independent courts. The two Courts of Last Resort arrangement exists only in Oklahoma and neighboring Texas.

The Supreme Court and Court of Criminal Appeals are courts of last resort. The Court of Civil Appeals is an intermediate appeals court. The District Courts are courts of general jurisdiction. The Workers’ Compensation Court, Court on Tax Review, and Municipal Courts are special courts with limited jurisdiction. The Court on the Judiciary and the Court of Impeachment are courts that are independent of the administration of the Supreme Court; there is no appeal from these court decisions.

=== Supreme Court ===
The Oklahoma Supreme Court is Oklahoma’s court of last resort in all civil matters and all matters concerning the Oklahoma Constitution. It consists of nine justices appointed by the governor to serve life terms, but unlike U.S. Supreme Court justices, they are subject to an election every six years in which voters choose whether or not to retain them. Each justice must be at least 30 years old, have previously been licensed as an attorney for five years, and have lived for at least one year in the Supreme Court judicial district from which they are selected.

Five of the nine justices are required to affirm, modify, or overturn any ruling of any lower court. Once the Court has reached a decision, one justice is selected to write the court’s opinion. Once published, the opinion becomes the controlling factor in the state’s law surrounding the issue(s) it addresses. This is known as "stare decisis". The justices select from among their members a chief justice and vice chief justice to serve two-year terms.

The Oklahoma Supreme Court is also charged with the administration of the entire state court system. The court normally exercises this responsibility through the adoption of rules governing the court system and the behavior of attorneys in state courts. The chief justice is the figure in charge of these rules.

=== Court of Criminal Appeals ===
The Oklahoma Court of Criminal Appeals is the Oklahoma court of last resort involving all criminal matters. The five judges are appointed by the Governor with the judges selecting a Chief Judge at the beginning of each term of court. Like the justices of the Supreme Court, the judges serve for life but must stand for election every six years to retain their position.

Regardless of where the appeal comes from, the Court of Criminal Appeals is always the first court to hear an appeal involving the death sentence.

Whenever there is a dispute involving whether a case falls under the jurisdiction of the Oklahoma Supreme Court or Court of Criminal Appeals, the Supreme Court determines, finally and authoritatively, which of the two courts has jurisdiction.

=== Court of Civil Appeals ===
Because the Supreme Court has neither the time nor the resources to hear all cases brought before it, the legislature created the Oklahoma Court of Civil Appeals. When a case is brought before the Supreme Court, the justices may choose to send the case to one of the four divisions of the Civil Court of Appeals, of which two are located in Tulsa and two in Oklahoma City. Each division of the court has three judges; they are appointed for life, but they must stand for election every six years to retain their positions.

Two of the three judges may choose to reaffirm, modify, or overturn any ruling of any lower court. However, if the Oklahoma Supreme Court disapproves of the court's ruling, it may review the decision.

=== District Courts ===
The backbone of the Oklahoma judiciary, the district courts, have general jurisdiction over almost all civil and criminal matters within their sphere of influence. Oklahoma has 77 district courts, each with one or more district judges and an associate district judge. The judges are elected, in a nonpartisan manner, to serve a four-year term. In the event of a vacancy in any of the district courts, the governor appoints a judge to serve until the next election. A special judge may be appointed to assist in the event of a heavy caseload.

Oklahoma is divided into nine Judicial Administrative Districts, involving several district courts to assure a well-organized system. From the judges of the district courts, one is selected to serve as the Presiding Judge, who is responsible for the administration of their district. The Presiding Judge is answerable to the Oklahoma Supreme Court.

Candidates for district judge must be a practicing lawyer or judge for the past four years and must live in the districts in which they seek election. Associate judges must have been practicing lawyers or judges for the past two years.

Civil appeals are heard by the Oklahoma Supreme Court and criminal appeals are heard by the Oklahoma Court of Criminal Appeals.

=== Workers' Compensation Court of Existing Claims ===
The Oklahoma Workers' Compensation Court of Existing Claims is a temporary court that hears workers' compensation claims for injuries occurring before February 1, 2014. It replaces the Workers' Compensation Court, which was dissolved by SB1062, codified in 85A O.S. Title 85A creates a new Workers' Compensation Commission, an administrative agency to hear workers' compensation claims arising on or after February 1, 2014. Claims submitted to the Court of Existing Claims are heard by a single judge in either Tulsa or Oklahoma City. A party who disapproves of the judge's ruling may request a hearing en banc, and appeals from such a hearing are heard by the Oklahoma Supreme Court. The court's mandate is scheduled to expire in 2020.

=== Court of Tax Review ===
The Oklahoma Court of Tax Review is a special court in the Oklahoma judiciary charged with hearing disputes involving illegal taxes levied by county and city governments. All tax review cases are sent to the Chief Justice of Oklahoma, who then sends the claim to the presiding judge of the administration district from which the claim originated. The presiding judge then appoints three judges to serve as the Court on Tax Review. Appeals from the court are heard by the Oklahoma Supreme Court.

=== Municipal Courts ===
With the exception of the Municipal Court of Oklahoma City and the Municipal Court of Tulsa, the Municipal Courts are courts of no record that operate under the administration of the Supreme Court but are not part of the state court system. The judges, unlike any other judge, are appointed directly by the mayors of Oklahoma's cities. The courts exist to oversee the administration of justice within cities and have jurisdiction only over the violations of city ordinances, which are criminal in nature. They have no civil jurisdiction. Appeals from Municipal Courts are heard by District Courts.

=== Court on the Judiciary ===
One of the two independent courts in the Oklahoma Judiciary, the Oklahoma Court on the Judiciary is the court responsible for removing judges from their position if they have committed illegal acts. One of three such courts in the nation (the others are in Texas and Alabama), the Court on the Judiciary insures that other courts best administer justice.

Any judge (aside from Supreme Court justices) may be forcefully removed from office if found guilty of gross neglect of duty, corruption in office, habitual drunkenness, commission while in office of any offense involving moral turpitude, gross partiality in office, oppression in office, or other grounds as specified by the legislature. Forced retirement may occur if the court finds the judge in question to be mentally or physically incapable to perform his job. No other penalties may be imposed by this court, although other courts can hear other charges.

The Court on the Judiciary consists of a nine-member Trial Division and a five-member Appellate Division. The court’s jurisdiction may be called into force by the Governor, Attorney General, Oklahoma Supreme Court, the Oklahoma Bar Association, or by the House of Representatives. Also, private citizens can file a formal complaint against a judge to be heard by the Oklahoma Council of Judicial Complaints. It the complaint is approved, the case is heard by the Trial Division of the Court.

All cases brought before the Court are heard by the Trial Division, and any appeals from it are heard by the Appellate Divisions. There are no appeals from the Appellate Division’s decisions, and not even the Oklahoma Supreme Court may change its rulings.

=== Court of Impeachment ===
The second independent court in the Oklahoma Judiciary is the Oklahoma Court of Impeachment, which is the Senate sitting. Impeachment charges are brought by the House of Representatives, and they are heard by the Senate, with the Chief Justice of Oklahoma presiding, unless the Chief Justice or any member of the Oklahoma Supreme Court is charged, in which case the Senate shall select one of its own members to preside.

Impeachment charges may only be brought against the Governor and all other statewide elected state officials (including the Oklahoma Supreme Court Justices) for willful neglect of duty, corruption in office, habitual drunkenness, incompetency, or any offense involving moral turpitude committed while in office. An impeached official is suspended from duty until the conclusion of the impeachment process. Should the impeachment fail, the officer in question returns to his duties. However, if the impeachment is successful and the defendant found guilty, he is removed from office.

== Officers ==
All judges and justices requiring appointment are appointed by the Governor of Oklahoma. Candidates must first go through a nominating process through the Oklahoma Judicial Nominating Commission, which selects three candidates to submit to the Governor for a single selection to the office.

== Composition ==
=== Appellate Courts ===
Supreme Court

Seat	Justice	Appointed by	Term start	Succeeded
1	M. John Kane IV	Kevin Stitt	2019	John Reif
2	Dustin Rowe	Kevin Stitt	2019	Patrick Wyrick
3	Noma Gurich	Brad Henry	2011	Marian P. Opala
4	Travis Jett	Kevin Stitt	2025	Yvonne Kauger
5	James R. Winchester	Frank Keating	2000	Alma Wilson
6	Dana Kuehn	Kevin Stitt	2021	Tom Colbert
7	James E. Edmondson	Brad Henry	2003	Hardy Summers
8	Doug Combs	Brad Henry	2010	Rudolph Hargrave
9	Richard Darby	Mary Fallin	2018	Joseph M. Watt

Court of Criminal Appeals

Seat	Judge	Appointed by	Term start	Succeeded
1	William Musseman	Kevin Stitt	2021	Dana Kuehn
2	Robert L. Hudson	Mary Fallin	2015	Charles Johnson
3	Gary L. Lumpkin	Henry Bellmon	1989	
4	Scott Rowland	Mary Fallin	2017	Arlene Johnson
5	David B. Lewis	Brad Henry	2005	

Court of Civil Appeals

Judge	Appointed by	Term start	Succeeded
Trevor Pemberton	Kevin Stitt	2020	Larry Joplin
Kenneth L. Buettner	Frank Keating	1996	
Robert D. Bell	Brad Henry	2005	Carl Jones
Deborah Barnes	Brad Henry	2008	
John F. Fischer	Brad Henry	2007	
Jane P. Wiseman	Brad Henry	2005	Joe C. Taylor
E. Bay Mitchell	Frank Keating	2002	James P. Garrett
Barbara Swinton	Mary Fallin	2016	William Hetherington
Brian Jack Goree	Mary Fallin	2012	Carol M. Hansen
Gregory Blackwell	Kevin Stitt	2021	P. Thomas Thornbrugh
W. Keith Rapp	George Nigh	1984	
Stacie Hixon	Kevin Stitt	2020	Jerry L. Goodman

Court of Military Appeals

Seat	Judge	Appointed by	Term start	Succeeded
1	Daniel G. Webber	Kevin Stitt	2020	
2	Michelle L. Keely	Kevin Stitt	2020	
3	TBD			

=== Trial Courts ===
==== District 1 ====
Beaver, Cimarron, Harper, Texas Counties

Judge	Position	County	Appointed by	Term start	Succeeded
Jon Parsley	District Judge	At-Large	Mary Fallin	2014	
Christine Marie Larson	Assoc. District Judge	Cimarron	Kevin Stitt	2019	
Ryan D. Reddick	Assoc. District Judge	Beaver	Mary Fallin	2011	Gerald Riffe
Aric Alley	Assoc. District Judge	Harper	Election	2015	
A. Clark Jett	Assoc. District Judge	Texas	Mary Fallin	2012	Ryan D. Reddick

==== District 2 ====
Beckham, Custer, Ellis, Roger Mills, Washita Counties

Judge	Position	County	Appointed by	Term start	Succeeded
Jill Carpenter Weedon	District Judge	At-Large	Election	2019	
Michelle Kirby Roper	Assoc. District Judge	Beckham	Election	2011	
Donna Dirickson	Assoc. District Judge	Custer	Election	2019	Jill Carpenter Weedon
Laurie Hays	Assoc. District Judge	Ellis	Election	2015	
F. Pat VerSteeg	Assoc. District Judge	Roger Mills	Brad Henry	2008	
Christopher Kelly	Assoc. District Judge	Washita	Election	2006	

==== District 3 ====
Greer, Harmon, Jackson, Kiowa, Tillman Counties

Judge	Position	County	Appointed by	Term start	Succeeded
Brad Leverett	District Judge	At-Large	Election	2019	
Eric G. Yarborough	Assoc. District Judge	Greer	Election	2015	
W. Mike Warren	Assoc. District Judge	Harmon	Election	1990	
Clark E. Huey	Assoc. District Judge	Jackson	Election	1995	
Rick Marsh	Assoc. District Judge	Kiowa	Election	2019	
Brad L. Benson	Assoc. District Judge	Tillman	Election	2019	

==== District 4 ====
Alfalfa, Blaine, Dewey, Garfield, Grant, Kingfisher, Major, Woods, Woodward Counties

Judge	Position	County	Appointed by	Term start	Succeeded
Justin P. Eilers	District Judge	At-Large	Election	2015	
Dennis Hladik	District Judge	At-Large	Election	2006	
Paul K. Woodward	District Judge	At-Large	Election	2010	
Loren Angle	Assoc. District Judge	Alfalfa	Election	2002	
Allison Lafferty	Assoc. District Judge	Blaine	Election	2018	
Celo Harrel	Assoc. District Judge	Dewey	Election	2019	Rick Bozarth
Tom Newby	Assoc. District Judge	Garfield	Brad Henry	2006	
Jack Hammontree	Assoc. District Judge	Grant	Election	2002	
Lance Schneiter	Assoc. District Judge	Kingfisher	Election	2019	
Tim Haworth	Assoc. District Judge	Major	Election	2011	
Mickey Jay Hadwiger	Assoc. District Judge	Woods	Frank Keating	2001	Alan R. Gottsch
Erin Kirksey	Assoc. District Judge	Woodward	Kevin Stitt	2020	

==== District 5 ====
Comanche, Cotton, Jefferson, Stephens Counties

Judge	Position	County	Appointed by	Term start	Succeeded
Ken Graham	District Judge	At-large	Election	2015	
Scott D. Meaders	District Judge	At-large	Mary Fallin	2017	Mark R. Smith
Gerald F. Neuwirth	District Judge	At-large	Brad Henry	2006	
Irma Newburn	District Judge	At-large	Mary Fallin	2016	Keith Byron Aycock
Emmit Tayloe	District Judge	At-large	Mary Fallin	2014	
Lisa Shaw	Assoc. District Judge	Comanche	Election	2015	
Michael C. Flanagan	Assoc. District Judge	Cotton	Election	2007	
Dennis Gay	Assoc. District Judge	Jefferson	Election	2010	
G. Brent Russell	Assoc. District Judge	Stephens	Brad Henry	2006	

==== District 6 ====
Caddo and Grady Counties

Judge	Position	County	Appointed by	Term start	Succeeded
Kory Kirkland	District Judge	At-Large	Mary Fallin	2017	
S. Wyatt Hill	Assoc. District Judge	Caddo	Brad Henry	2004	
Z. Joseph Young	Assoc. District Judge	Grady	Election	2019	

==== District 7 ====
Oklahoma County

Judge	Position	County	Appointed by	Term start	Succeeded
Don Andrews	District Judge	Oklahoma	Election	2015	
K. Nikki Kirkpatrick	District Judge	Oklahoma	Kevin Stitt	2021	Kendra Coleman
Heather Coyle	District Judge	Oklahoma	Election	2019	
Ray C. Elliott	District Judge	Oklahoma	Frank Keating	1999	
C. Brent Dishman	District Judge	Oklahoma	Kevin Stitt	2021	Timothy Henderson
Natalie Mai	District Judge	Oklahoma	Election	2019	
Richard Ogden	District Judge	Oklahoma	Mary Fallin	2017	Barbara Swinton
Amy Palumbo	District Judge	Oklahoma	Election	2019	Howard Haralson
Kaitlyn G. Allen	District Judge	Oklahoma	Kevin Stitt	2021	Thomas E. Prince
Susan Stallings	District Judge	Oklahoma	Election	2019	William D. Graves
Sheila Stinson	District Judge	Oklahoma	Kevin Stitt	2020	Lisa Davis
Kenneth L. Stoner	District Judge	Oklahoma	Mary Fallin	2017	Bryan C. Dixon
Lydia Green	District Judge	Oklahoma	Kevin Stitt	2025	Aletia Timmons
Cindy Truong	District Judge	Oklahoma	Election	2011	
Anthony L. Bonner, Jr	District Judge	Oklahoma	Kevin Stitt	2021	Trevor Pemberton
Richard Kirby	Assoc. District Judge	Oklahoma	Election	2007	

==== District 8 ====
Kay and Noble Counties

Judge	Position	County	Appointed by	Term start	Succeeded
Lee Turner	District Judge	At-Large	Election	2015	DW Boyd
David R. Bandy	Assoc. District Judge	Kay	Election	2015	
Nikki G. Leach	Assoc. District Judge	Noble	Mary Fallin	2014	Dan Allen

==== District 9 ====
Payne and Logan Counties

Judge	Position	County	Appointed by	Term start	Succeeded
Phillip C. Corley	District Judge	At-Large	Election	2011	
Louis A. Duel	Assoc. District Judge	Logan	Election	2011	
Stephen R. Kistler	Assoc. District Judge	Payne	Brad Henry	2008	

==== District 10 ====
Osage County

Judge	Position	County	Appointed by	Term start	Succeeded
Stuart Tate	District Judge	Osage	Kevin Stitt	2020	M. John Kane IV
Burl Estes	Assoc. District Judge	Osage	Kevin Stitt	2021	Stuart Tate

==== District 11 ====
Nowata and Washington Counties

Judge	Position	County	Appointed by	Term start	Succeeded
Linda Thomas	District Judge	At-Large	Election	2019	
Carl G. Gibson	Assoc. District Judge	Nowata	Election	2011	
Russell Vaclaw	Assoc. District Judge	Washington	Election	2007	

==== District 12 ====
Craig, Mayes, and Rogers Counties

Judge	Position	County	Appointed by	Term start	Succeeded
Sheila Condren	District Judge	Rogers	Election	2015	
Stephen Pazzo	District Judge	Rogers	Election	2015	
Shawn Taylor	District Judge	Mayes	Election	2018	
Joseph Gardner	Assoc. District Judge	Craig	Election	2019	
Rebecca J. Gore	Assoc. District Judge	Mayes	Election	2019	
Susan Nigh	Assoc. District Judge	Rogers	Kevin Stitt	2021	Kassie McCoy

==== District 13 ====
Delaware and Ottawa Counties

Judge	Position	County	Appointed by	Term start	Succeeded
Barry V. Denney	District Judge	At-large	Election	2019	
Dave Crutchfield	Assoc. District Judge	Delaware	Election	2019	
Jennifer McAffrey	Assoc. District Judge	Ottawa	Election	2019	

==== District 14 ====
Pawnee, Tulsa Counties

Judge	Position	County	Appointed by	Term start	Succeeded
Daman H. Cantrell	District Judge	Tulsa	Election	2007	
Martha Rupp Carter	District Judge	Tulsa	Election	2019	
Douglas E. Drummond	District Judge	Tulsa	Election	2015	
Kurt G. Glassco	District Judge	Tulsa	Brad Henry	2009	
Kelly Greenough	District Judge	Tulsa	Mary Fallin	2016	
Sharon Holmes	District Judge	Tulsa	Election	2015	
William LaFortune	District Judge	Tulsa	Election	2015	
Dawn Moody	District Judge	Tulsa	Election	2019	
William J. Musseman	District Judge	Tulsa	Election	2011	
Rebecca B. Nightingale	District Judge	Tulsa	Election	2003	
Tracy Priddy	District Judge	Tulsa	Election	2019	James Caputo
Caroline Wall	District Judge	Tulsa	Election	2011	
James Huber	District Judge	Tulsa	Kevin Stitt	2020	Linda Morrissey
Michelle Keely	District Judge	Tulsa	Kevin Stitt	2020	Jefferson Sellers
Patrick Pickerill	Assoc. District Judge	Pawnee	Mary Fallin	2013	
David Guten	District Judge	Tulsa	Election	2022	

==== District 15 ====
Adair, Cherokee, Muskogee, Sequoyah, Wagoner Counties

Judge	Position	County	Appointed by	Term start	Succeeded
Timothy King	District Judge	Muskogee	Kevin Stitt	2019	Mike Norman
Douglas A. Kirkley	District Judge	Wagoner	Election	2019	Darrel Sheppard
Bret Smith	District Judge	Muskogee	Election	2019	Thomas Alford
J. Jeffrey Payton	District Judge	Adair	Election	2007	
L. Elizabeth Brown	Assoc. District Judge	Adair	Election	2003	
Joshua King	Assoc. District Judge	Cherokee	Election	2019	Mark Dobbins
Orvil Loge	Assoc. District Judge	Muskogee	Election	2023	Norman D. Thygesen
Kyle E. Waters	Assoc. District Judge	Sequoyah	Election	2015	
Rebecca Hunter	Assoc. District Judge	Wagoner	Election	2023	Dennis N. Shook

==== District 16 ====
Haskell, Latimer, LeFlore Counties

Judge	Position	County	Appointed by	Term start	Succeeded
Jon Sullivan	District Judge	At-large	Election	2011	
Brian Henderson	Assoc. District Judge	Haskell	Election	2007	John D. Henderson
Marion D. Fry	Assoc. District Judge	LeFlore	Election	2015	

==== District 17 ====
Choctaw, McCurtain, Pushmataha Counties

Judge	Position	County	Appointed by	Term start	Succeeded
Michael D. DeBerry	District Judge	At-large	Mary Fallin	2012	Willard Driesel
Bill Baze	Assoc. District Judge	Choctaw	Mary Fallin	2014	
Kenneth R. Farley	Assoc. District Judge	McCurtain	Mary Fallin	2013	
Jana Kay Wallace	Assoc. District Judge	Pushmataha	Brad Henry	2009	

==== District 18 ====
McIntosh, Pittsburg Counties

Judge	Position	County	Appointed by	Term start	Succeeded
Mike Hogan	District Judge	At-large	Election	2019	James Bland
Brendon Bridges	Assoc. District Judge	McIntosh	Election	2019	James Pratt
Tim Mills	Assoc. District Judge	Pittsburg	Election	2015	

==== District 19 ====
Bryan County

Judge	Position	County	Appointed by	Term start	Succeeded
Mark Campbell	District Judge	Bryan	Brad Henry	2005	
Trace C. Sherrill	Assoc. District Judge	Bryan	Election	2018	

==== District 20 ====
Carter, Johnston, Love, Marshall, Murray Counties

Judge	Position	County	Appointed by	Term start	Succeeded
Wallace Coppedge	District Judge	At-Large	Election	2011	
Dennis Morris	District Judge	At-Large	Election	2011	
Thomas K. Baldwin	Assoc. District Judge	Carter	Election	2015	
Laura Corbin	Assoc. District Judge	Johnston	Election	2019	
Todd Hicks	Assoc. District Judge	Love	Election	2015	
Gregory L. Johnson	Assoc. District Judge	Marshall	Mary Fallin	2011	
Aaron Duck	Assoc. District Judge	Murray		2011	

==== District 21 ====
Cleveland, Garvin, McClain Counties

Judge	Position	County	Appointed by	Term start	Succeeded
Thad Balkman	District Judge	At-large	Mary Fallin	2013	
Leah Edwards	District Judge	At-Large	Mary Fallin	2015	Greg Dixon
Michael D. Tupper	District Judge	At-large	Mary Fallin	2017	Tracy Schumacher
Jeff Virgin	District Judge	At-large	Election	2015	
Lori Walkley	District Judge	At-large	Brad Henry	2003	
Bethany Stanley	Assoc. District Judge	Cleveland	Kevin Stitt	2020	
Steven Kendall	Assoc. District Judge	Garvin	Mary Fallin	2013	John A. Blake
Charles Gray	Assoc. District Judge	McClain	Election	2006	

==== District 22 ====
Hughes, Pontotoc, Seminole Counties

Judge	Position	County	Appointed by	Term start	Succeeded
Steven Kessinger	District Judge	At-large	Election	2015	
Timothy L. Olsen	District Judge	At-large	Election	2021	George Butner
Trisha D. Smith	Assoc. District Judge	Hughes	Election	2021	
Lori L. Jackson	Assoc. District Judge	Pontotoc	Election	2015	
Brett Butner	Assoc. District Judge	Seminole	Election	2019	Timothy Olsen

==== District 23 ====
Lincoln, Pottawatomie Counties

Judge	Position	County	Appointed by	Term start	Succeeded
Cindy Ferrell Ashwood	District Judge	At-Large	Election	2011	
John G. Canavan	District Judge	At-large	Election	2015	
Sheila Kirk	Assoc. District Judge	Lincoln	Election	2011	
Tracy McDaniel	Assoc. District Judge	Pottawatomie	Election	2019	

==== District 24 ====
Okfuskee, Okmulgee, Creek Counties

Judge	Position	County	Appointed by	Term start	Succeeded
Douglas W. Golden	District Judge	At-large	Brad Henry	2005	Donald Thompson
Kelly Hake	District Judge	At-large	Election	2019	
Lawrence W. Parish	District Judge	At-large	Brad Henry	2004	Franklin D. Rahhal
Pandee Ramirez	District Judge	At-large	Kevin Stitt	2020	
Laura Farris	Assoc. District Judge	Creek	Kevin Stitt	2020	
Maxey Reilly	Assoc. District Judge	Okfuskee	Mary Fallin	2017	David N. Martin
Cindy Pickering	Assoc. District Judge	Okmulgee	Election	2014	

==== District 25 ====
Atoka, Coal Counties

Judge	Position	County	Appointed by	Term start	Succeeded
Paula Inge	District Judge	At-Large	Mary Fallin	2013	Richard E. Branam
Preston Harbuck	Assoc. District Judge	Atoka	Election	2010	
D. Clay Mowdy	Assoc. District Judge	Coal	Election	2007	

==== District 26 ====
Canadian County

Judge	Position	County	Appointed by	Term start	Succeeded
Paul Hesse	District Judge	Canadian	Mary Fallin	2017	
Jack McCurdy	District Judge	Canadian	Election	2019	
Bob Hughey	Assoc. District Judge	Canadian	Brad Henry	2008	

== See also ==
- Government of Oklahoma
