= 2026 Oklahoma elections =

- November 3, 2026

A general election took place in the U.S. State of Oklahoma on November 3, 2026. Oklahoma voters elected one of the state's U.S. Senators, the Governor of Oklahoma, the Lieutenant Governor of Oklahoma, the Attorney General of Oklahoma, the Oklahoma State Auditor and Inspector, the Oklahoma State Superintendent of Public Instruction, the Oklahoma State Treasurer, 1 of the 3 Oklahoma Corporation Commissioners, the Oklahoma Commissioner of Labor, the Oklahoma Insurance Commissioner, all of its seats to the House of Representatives, all of the seats of the Oklahoma House of Representatives, 24 of 48 seats in the Oklahoma State Senate, and other local and municipal offices.

== Background ==
Every four years the Governor of Oklahoma, the Lieutenant Governor of Oklahoma, the Attorney General of Oklahoma, the Oklahoma State Auditor and Inspector, the Oklahoma State Superintendent of Public Instruction, the Oklahoma State Treasurer, 1 of the 3 Oklahoma Corporation Commissioners, the Oklahoma Commissioner of Labor, and the Oklahoma Insurance Commissioner are elected in statewide election with the next election scheduled for 2026. Statewide elected officials are limited to serving two terms in any office.

Every two years all of its seats to the House of Representatives and the Oklahoma House of Representatives are up for reelection. Half of the Oklahoma Senate's seats will be up for reelection. Incumbent U.S. Senator Markwayne Mullin's senate seat is up for election in 2026.

Oklahoma uses closed primary elections unless a political party specifically request to open their primary. In the last election, only the Oklahoma Democratic Party requested to open its primaries. In December 2025, the Oklahoma State Election Board announced all primaries in 2026 and 2027 would be closed. The Oklahoma Democratic Party Secretary Kati Cain submitted a notice for open primaries on August 4, while the state board indicated notices had to be submitted during the month of November.

== Federal ==
=== U.S. House ===
Parties	Seats			
Parties	2024	2026	+/-	Strength
Republican Party	5			100%
Democratic Party	0			0%

== Governor ==
Governor Kevin Stitt has served two terms and is term limited.

Following the elections on November 3rd, Mike Mazzei was elected to become the 29th Governor of Oklahoma.

== Lieutenant governor ==
Lieutenant Governor Matt Pinnell has served two terms and is term limited.

== Attorney general ==
Attorney General Gentner Drummond has served one term.

== State Treasurer ==
State Treasurer Todd Russ ran for re-election to a second term but lost renomination to Cindy Byrd.

== State auditor and inspector ==
2026 Oklahoma State Auditor election
- November 3, 2026
Nominee	Melissa Capps (Uncontested)
Party	Republican
State Auditor before election
Cindy Byrd
Republican
Elected State Auditor
Melissa Capps
Republican

State Auditor and Inspector Cindy Byrd has served two terms and is term limited. Republican Melissa Capps, a deputy state auditor, was the only candidate to file, and was therefore elected by default.

== State superintendent ==
State Superintendent of Public Instruction Ryan Walters was elected in 2022, but resigned in September 2025. Then Governor Kevin Stitt appointed Lindel Fields, who declined to run in this election.

== Corporation Commissioner ==
Corporation Commissioner Todd Hiett has served two terms and is term limited.

== Labor Commissioner ==
Labor Commissioner Leslie Osborn has served two terms and is term limited.

== Insurance Commissioner ==
Insurance Commissioner Glen Mulready has served two terms and is term limited.

== State legislature ==
=== Oklahoma House ===
Parties	Seats			
Parties	2024	2026	+/-	Strength
Republican Party	81	75	-	79%
Democratic Party	20	26	-	21%

=== Oklahoma Senate ===
Parties	Seats			
Parties	2024	2026	+/-	Strength
Republican Party	40	40	-	83%
Democratic Party	8	8	-	17%

== Judicial elections ==
=== Retention ===
Oklahoma Supreme Court Justices Richard Darby, Travis Jett, M. John Kane IV and Dana Kuehn were all retained. Oklahoma Court of Criminal Appeals Judge Robert Hudson was retained. Oklahoma Court of Civil Appeals Judges Deborah Barnes, Stacie Hixon, Jane Wiseman, and James Huber were all also retained.

== Ballot initiatives ==
In Oklahoma, ballot initiatives are drafted by their proponents and then submitted to the Oklahoma Secretary of State who then must notify the Governor, the Oklahoma Election Board, and publish a notice so that any citizen of the state may file a protest as to the constitutionality of the ballot initiative. Citizens have 10 days to file a protest with the Oklahoma Supreme Court. After all legal challenges are heard, the petition process begins. The number of signatures required for the petition to be successful depends on the type of ballot initiative, but all measures are based on the total number of votes cast in the last general election for Governor. Referendums and Initiatives require the least number of signatures at 5% and 8% respectively. Initiatives for Constitutional Changes require 15%. Rejected Initiative or Referendum Measures require 25%. Once collected, the signed petitions are submitted to the Secretary of State for counting. Once counted, the proposed ballot title is sent to the Attorney General of Oklahoma for legal review. After this review, the Secretary of State submits the signed petition to the Oklahoma Supreme Court. After a short period where objections can be filed, the Secretary of State sends the petition to the Governor and the State Election Board. The Governor of Oklahoma chooses the date of the vote on the ballot initiative.

=== Scheduled ===
State Question 832, which would have gradually raised the minimum wage to $15 and tie future increases to U.S. Department of Labor data, was scheduled for election on June 16, 2026. The amendment failed to pass.

State Question 844 and 846 are scheduled for election on August 25, 2026. SQ 844 would involves "reimbursement of certain revenue," while SQ 846 involves "proof of identity for voting." SQ 844 failed, while SQ 846 was approved.

State Question 845 was scheduled for election on November 3, 2026. The question would have altered the Oklahoma Judicial Nominating Commission. It failed alongside State Question 847, which would have altered property taxes.

== Local elections ==
- 2026 Oklahoma City mayoral election
- 2026 Tulsa municipal elections
