= TU Law =

TU Law may refer to:

- Tulane University School of Law, in New Orleans, Louisiana
- University of Tulsa College of Law, in Tulsa, Oklahoma
