= Oklahoma City University School of Law =

Law school in Oklahoma City, Oklahoma, US

Coordinates: 35°28′32″N 97°31′00″W

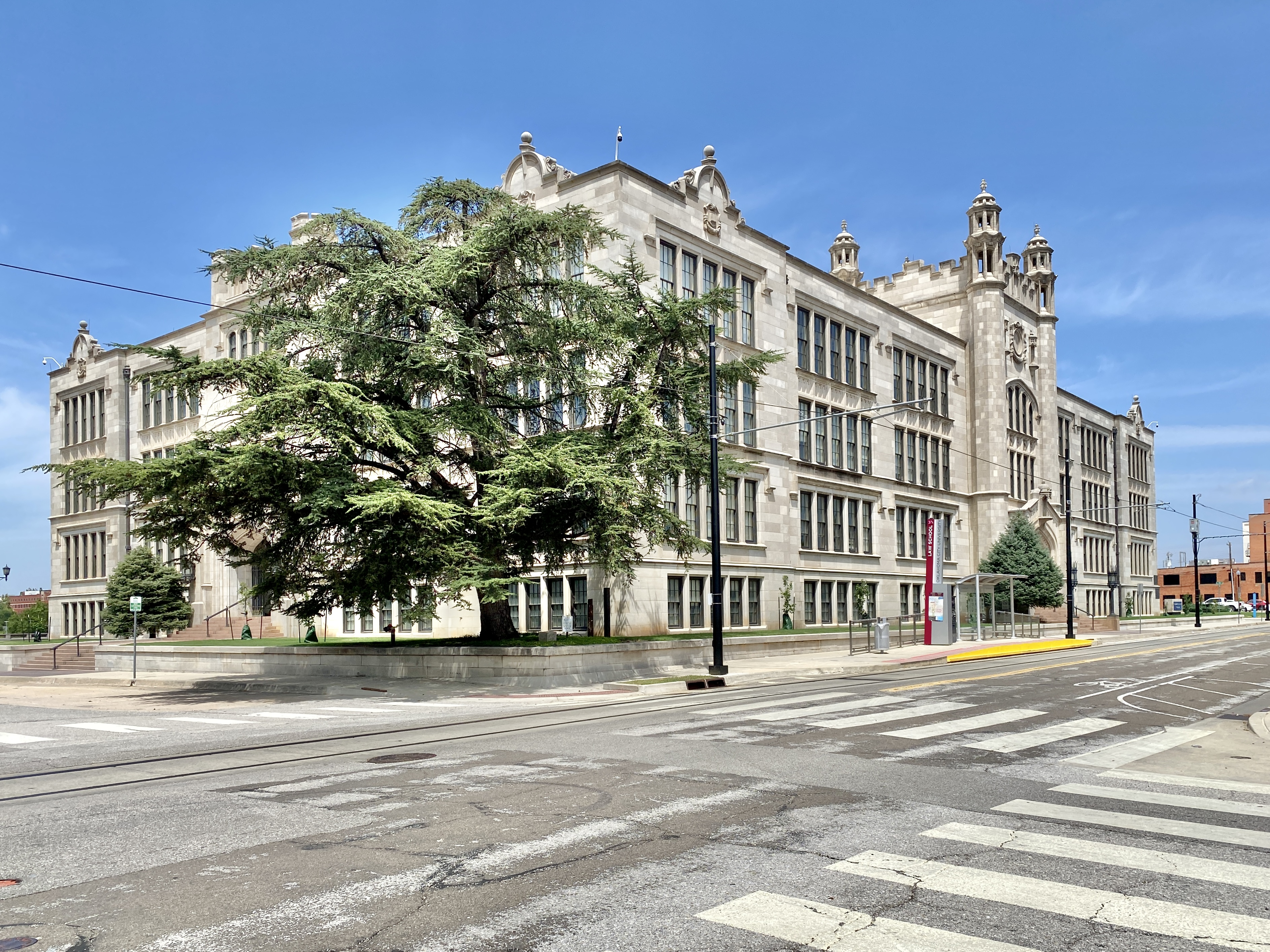
- OCU Law has been located in the former Central High School building since 2015
- Motto: Veritas Ecclesia Cognitio (Truth, Church, Knowledge)
- Established: 1907
- School type: Private
- Endowment: $ 80.5 million
- Dean: David Holt
- Location: Oklahoma City, Oklahoma, U.S.
- Enrollment: 469
- Faculty: 33
- USNWR ranking: 158 (tie) (USNWR 2025)
- Bar pass rate: 57.34%
- Website: law.okcu.edu
- ABA profile: OCU Law Profile

Oklahoma City University School of Law, also known as OCU Law, is the law school of Oklahoma City University. OCU Law is located in Oklahoma City, Oklahoma, and was founded in 1907. OCU Law was located in the Sarkeys Law Center on the southwest side of the Oklahoma City University campus until spring 2015, when it moved to a new campus near downtown Oklahoma City.

The Chickasaw Nation Law Library at OCU Law houses a collection of more than 300,000 volume and volume equivalents, and is open to the public. OCU Law has been accredited by the ABA since 1960 and has been a member of the Association of American Law Schools since 2003.

The 2023-2024 edition of U.S. News & World Report's Best Law Schools ranked OCU Law as #150 (out of a total of 175 ranked, with 180-196 being "rank not published"). The 2022 edition of U.S. News & World Report's Best Law Schools listed OCU Law as a 4th Tier Law School ranked #147-193 among 204 ABA accredited schools. In 2023, preLaw Magazine ranked OCU Law in the top 5 schools for Native American and in the top 50 most diverse law schools. In 2023, the Princeton Review ranked OCU Law in the top 10 law schools Most Chosen by Older Students and included OCU Law on its list of Best Law Schools.

According to OCU Law's 2021 ABA-required disclosures, 91.5% of the Class of 2021 were employed nine months after graduation and 86% of the class was employed in bar passage required or J.D. advantage positions.

== History ==
The law school has educated judges, political figures and founders of prestigious private law firms. Due to its long tradition of providing evening and part-time schedule options, the law school has also produced highly successful business leaders, particularly in the real estate, engineering, and oil and gas industries. The student body commonly includes medical doctors, university professors, military officers, and professionals from other fields. The School of Law is a member of the Association of American Law Schools and has been accredited by the American Bar Association since 1960.

The current dean of Oklahoma City University School of Law is David Holt, who also serves as the Mayor of Oklahoma City and took over during the Fall of 2023. The previous Dean was Jim Roth, former member of Oklahoma Corporation Commission. His predecessor Dean Valerie Couch was a former federal U.S. Magistrate Judge for the U.S. District Court for the Western District of Oklahoma, who succeeded Lawrence Hellman, who succeeded Rennard Strickland, a noted legal historian and former Dean of the University of Oregon School of Law, and the Honorable Robert Harlan Henry, Judge of the United States Court of Appeals for the Tenth Circuit.

=== List of Former Deans ===
Name	Term	Notes	No.
C.B. Ames	1907-1910	Judge	1
Roger Stephens	1952-1957		2
John G. Hervey	1957-1968		3
Ted Foster	1968-1973		4
Richard E. Coulson	1974-1976		5
Edward Palmer	1977-1981		6
William Brian Martin	1982-1983		7
Stuart S. Strasner	1984-1991		8
Robert H. Henry	1991-1994	Tenth Circuit Judge	9
Rennard Strickland	1995-1997		10
Lawrence K. Hellman	1998-2011		11
Valerie K. Couch	2012-2017	First Female Dean	12
James A. Roth	2018-2023		13
David F. Holt	2023-		14

== Publications at the Oklahoma City University School of Law ==
Students of the Juris Doctor (JD) program are involved in preparing and publishing:

- Oklahoma City University Law Review - The Law Review is published twice a year. It has been published for more than 40 years and includes articles from professors, practitioners, judges, and OCU Law students. The OCU Law Review provides the opportunity for students to write and edit scholarly articles while being exposed to viewpoints and commentaries written by authors from the United States, as well as internationally. Membership is highly selective and third-year members have the opportunity to serve on the Law Review's Board of Editors. Service on the law review is an integral part of the educational experience for those students selected for it. In recent years, the law review has published symposia on topics of importance to Oklahoma practitioners. The OCU Law Review is ranked in the first tier of law journals according to the Global Jurist.
- Oklahoma Tribal Court Reports
- Conference on Consumer Finance Quarterly Report

== Academics ==
The School of Law offers Juris Doctor programs for full-time and part-time students. In addition, Oklahoma City University School of Law offers students the ability to obtain a joint J.D./M.B.A., a joint J.D./M.A. in Nonprofit Organizations and Leadership and a J.D./M.P.A degree.

== Programs ==
=== Oklahoma Innocence Project ===
The Oklahoma Innocence Project (OIP) at Oklahoma City University School of Law is the only Innocence Clinic in the state. Students in the Oklahoma Innocence Clinic work as part of the Innocence Project to identify and rectify wrongful convictions by conducting investigations and making recommendations regarding litigation. Students draft pleadings, motions, briefs, and appear in court to obtain post-conviction relief for the clinic's clients. Students in the clinic participate in weekly meetings devoted to training and case assessment.

=== American Indian Law & Sovereignty Center ===
The American Indian Law & Sovereignty Center is an academic law and policy center focusing on the complexities of American Indian law and tribal law. The Sovereignty Center provides services for tribal governments and stakeholders and offers direct legal services to individuals through the American Indian Wills Clinic.

Under the supervision of a faculty clinician, students in the Wills Clinic provide wills and estate planning services to American Indians owning trust or restricted property in Oklahoma. Clinic students are primarily responsible for all case-related work including fact gathering, developing legal theories, and initial document drafting. During the semester, students are expected to provide legal services for an average of 6 to 10 hours per week outside of class time. The classroom component complements students’ fieldwork.

=== The Collaborative: Law Clinic for Business and Innovation ===
Students, under close faculty supervision, provide legal assistance in a variety of early-stage legal matters, including entity formation, contract drafting and review, intellectual property protection, and other transactional matters to business startups, entrepreneurs, and community nonprofit organizations to help them establish successful for profit and nonprofit enterprises. The clinic targets entrepreneurs and innovators located in the underserved Oklahoma City community who are not able to afford retained legal counsel. In the clinic seminar, students learn the substantive law and practical skills needed to effectively advise entrepreneurial clients. The clinic also looks closely at broader ethical considerations around power dynamics, advising businesses about adopting a business strategy that focuses on the three pillars of the environment, social, and governance (ESG), and having a more inclusive and diverse workforce.

The Collaborate Clinic is the only USPTO certified and Copyright Claims Board certified law school clinic in all of Oklahoma. In June of 2024, OCU Law also inherited the Pro Bono Program from Saint Louis University School of Law, which matches under-resourced inventors and start up clients in Missouri, Oklahoma, Nebraska, Kansas and Arkansas to registered patent attorneys based anywhere who want to volunteer and help with pro bono hours of legal assistance.

=== Norick Municipal Law Research Clinic ===
The Norick Municipal Law Research Clinic, in partnership with the City of Oklahoma City's Municipal Counselor's Office, provides students an opportunity to explore and research municipal law. Students are paired with attorney mentors and research issues handled by the office, including criminal justice, civil litigation, labor and employment, land use and economic development, trusts, utilities, elections, and finance. Students develop professional skills through live client meetings, in-depth research, and drafting formal research memoranda. The semester-long experience culminates with a client presentation where students present and discuss their research findings.

=== Housing Eviction Legal Assistance Program (HELP) Clinic ===
A staggering 200 families face eviction in Oklahoma County every week. Many of these families have limited knowledge of their rights as tenants and many do not have access to an attorney before reaching Oklahoma County's Forcible Entry and Detainer docket. OCU Law has received a generous grant from the Oklahoma Bar Foundation to create HELP.

HELP was created to provide pro bono legal assistance to those facing either lease disputes with a landlord or eviction by informing them about their procedural and substantive rights and detouring them from facing the consequences of eviction. The program is directed by attorney Richard M. Klinge. OCU Law students who have a community-driven work ethic are recruited to help these families while gaining experience with basic legal skills.

=== Externship program ===
Oklahoma City University School of Law's prime location downtown leads to numerous opportunities for students to discover new and interesting aspects of the law through 80-plus externship sites. New sites are added regularly and each site has multiple placements. The School of Law offers five different externship focus areas: Corporate Counsel, Government Practice, Judicial, Litigation Practice and Native American.

== Employment ==
According to OCU Law's official 2021 ABA-required disclosures, 91.5% of the Class of 2021 was employed in some capacity.

== Costs ==
Tuition at Oklahoma City University School of Law is $1,065 per credit hour. Other expenses include: general fees, parking and security fee, Student Bar Association fee, Installment Plan Fee, Installment Finance Fee and a Finance Fee.

== Notable alumni and students ==
Name	Class	Accomplishments
Hannah Diggs Atkins	1985	Oklahoma Secretary of State, Civil Rights Leader
Deborah Barnes	1983	Judge, Oklahoma Court of Civil Appeals 2008–Present
Michael D. Brown	1981	Director and Administrator of Federal Emergency Management Agency (FEMA)
Jeff Cloud	1991	Elected commissioner of the Oklahoma Corporation Commission 2004–2011
Brandon Creighton	1998	Member of the Texas House of Representatives from his native Montgomery County in the Houston suburbs
Mickey Edwards	1969	US Representative from Oklahoma's 5th district who served from 1973 to 1993. Also, an author, political commentator, and professor.
Enoch Kelly Haney	1964	Principal Chief of the Seminole Nation of Oklahoma
Carol Hansen	1974	Judge, Oklahoma Court of Civil Appeals 1985–Present
Elizabeth A. Hayden	1980	District Judge for Stearns County, Minnesota 1986–2009
David Holt	2009	Oklahoma City Mayor 2018–Present and Dean of OCU Law, 2023–Present
Ernest Istook	1976	US Representative from Oklahoma's 5th district who served from 1993 to 2006 and the Oklahoma Republican gubernatorial nominee in 2006
Yvonne Kauger	1969	Associate Justice, Supreme Court of Oklahoma 1984–Present
Todd Lamb	2005	Lt. Governor of Oklahoma 2011–Present
Richard Lerblance	1979	Senator from District 7 of the Oklahoma State Senate 2003–Present
Johnston Murray	1946	14th Governor of the State of Oklahoma
Marian P. Opala	1953	Associate Justice, Supreme Court of Oklahoma 1978–2010
T. W. Shannon	2002	First African-American Speaker of the Oklahoma House of Representatives (42nd Speaker)
James R. Winchester	1977	Chief Justice, Supreme Court of Oklahoma 2007–Present
Andrew Benton	1979	President, Pepperdine University 2000–2019
Bob Burke	1979	Legal historian and author, former Oklahoma Secretary of Commerce
Barry Grissom	1981	U.S. Attorney for the District of Kansas 2010–2016, founder of Kansas Civil Rights Symposium
Sandra Mitchell	1997	Deputy Commissioner General of the United Nations Relief and Works Agency for UNRWA 2014–2020
Rick Rescorla	1975	Evacuated over 2,700 people from the World Trade Center's south tower on 9/11
Jim Roth	1994	Oklahoma Corporation Commission 2007–2009, Oklahoma County Commissioner 2002–2007, first openly LGBT person to hold a statewide elected office in Oklahoma, Dean of OCU Law 2018–2023
Carl Alexandre	1984	Deputy Special Representative of the United Nations Stabilization Mission in Haiti (MINUSTAH) 2013–present
Robert J. Troester	1987	U.S. Attorney for the Western District of Oklahoma, 2022–present
Hannah Atkins	2000	Member of the Oklahoma House of Representatives 1968–1980; first African-American woman elected to the Oklahoma House of Representatives
Vicki Behenna	1984	District Attorney of Oklahoma County, former Assistant United States Attorney for the Western District of Oklahoma, and former executive director of the Oklahoma Innocence Project at OCU Law
Ronald Lloyd Howland	1964	U.S. Magistrate Judge, U.S. District Court for the Western District of Oklahoma (1978–2008), and the judge who presided over the arraignment, preliminary hearing and detention hearing for Timothy McVeigh
Gary M. Purcell	1975	U.S. Magistrate Judge, U.S. District Court for the Western District of Oklahoma (1992–2023), and longest active serving U.S. Magistrate Judge in the history of the U.S. Court of Appeals for the Tenth Circuit
Kimberly E. West	1983	U.S. Magistrate Judge, U.S. District Court for the Eastern District of Oklahoma, 2005–Present; 1990–1996, Judge of the Oklahoma Workers Compensation Court
Jason A. Robertson	1997	U.S. Magistrate Judge, U.S. District Court for the Eastern District of Oklahoma, 2022–Present
Ronald C. Griffin	1999	U.S. Magistrate Judge, U.S. District Court for the Western District of Texas, 2018–Present
Joseph A. Cordova	1992	U.S. Magistrate Judge, U.S. District Court for the Eastern District of Oklahoma, 2023–Present
