= Jim Huber (judge) =

American judge

Oklahoma Court of Civil Appeals
- Incumbent
- Assumed office April 6, 2023
- Appointed by: Kevin Stitt
- Preceded by: Keith Rapp

District Judge for Tulsa County
- In office October 16, 2020 – April 6, 2023
- Appointed by: Kevin Stitt
- Preceded by: Linda G. Morrissey
- Succeeded by: Richard L. Hathcoat

Personal details
- Born: James Robert Huber
- Education: University of Oklahoma; University of Tulsa College of Law

James Huber is an American judge currently serving on the Oklahoma Court of Civil Appeals since 2023. He previously served as the District Judge for Tulsa County from 2020 to 2023 and as a Special Judge in Tulsa County from 2019 to 2020.

== Biography ==
Huber graduated from the University of Oklahoma in 1990 and the University of Tulsa College of Law in 1993. He started his legal career at Malloy and Associates. He managed the J. R. Huber Law Firm from 1995 to 2005 and The Collier & Huber Law Firm from 2005 to 2019. From 2019 to 2020, he served as a special judge for Tulsa County. On October 16, 2020, he was appointed District Judge for Tulsa County by Governor Kevin Stitt. On April 6, 2023, Stitt appointed Huber to the Oklahoma Court of Civil Appeals. He won his first retention election in 2024.
