= Doug Gabbard II =

American judge

Judge of the Oklahoma Court of Civil Appeals
- In office September 2005 – July 2011
- Appointed by: Brad Henry
- Succeeded by: P. Thomas Thornbrugh

Doug Gabbard II is an American judge on the Oklahoma Court of Civil Appeals, the intermediate appellate court in the state of Oklahoma.

== Background and education ==
Judge Doug Gabbard was born in Lindsay, Oklahoma and earned a bachelor's and Juris Doctor degree from the University of Oklahoma.
