= Charles L. Owens =

American judge

Charles L. Owens (April 13, 1930 – May 24, 2016) was the first African-American judge in Oklahoma. He was appointed by Governor Dewey F. Bartlett in 1968.

== Background ==
Owens was born in Tulsa, Oklahoma and graduated from Booker T. Washington High School in 1948. He graduated from Lincoln University in Jefferson City, MO in 1952 with a degree in business administration. He served with the Signal Corps in Germany and France from 1952 to 1954. He later worked for the Tulsa Police Department while attending law school at the University of Tulsa, where he graduated in 1960. He was admitted to the Oklahoma Bar Association in 1960 and formed a partnership with Edward Lawrence Goodwin, publisher of the Oklahoma Eagle. He was appointed as the first African-American assistant attorney general in Oklahoma in 1963 by Charles R. Nesbitt. Owens argued a U.S. Supreme Court Case in 1968, which was the first criminal case from Oklahoma which the Supreme Court granted a full hearing.

== See also ==
- List of African-American jurists
