= Larry Catá Backer =

Cuban-American legal scholar

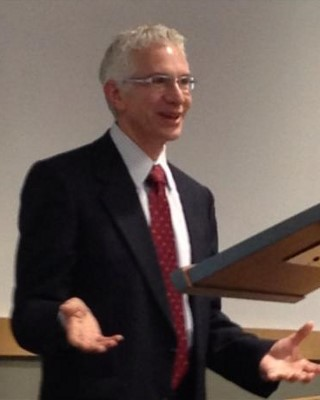
Larry Catá Backer

Larry Catá Backer (born 1 February 1955) is a Cuban-American legal scholar and professor of law and international affairs. He holds a professorship at the Penn State University, and is the W. Richard and Mary Eshelman Faculty Scholar Professor of Law and International Affairs, Penn State Law and School of International Affairs, Pennsylvania State University (2001–), Ashgate Publishing Globalization Law & Policy Series editor (2010–), and the executive director of the Washington-based NGO Coalition for Peace and Ethics (2006–).

A prominent comparative corporate and international law scholar and a leading researcher in constitutional law, Professor Backer is a member of the American Law Institute and the European Corporate Governance Institute. He has served as a grant peer reviewer for The Hague Institute for the Internationalisation of Law in the Netherlands, Social Sciences and Humanities Research Council of Canada, and others.

== Background and education ==
Backer was born in Cuba and moved to Miami, FL at an early age after the Cuban Revolution of 1959. Backer was educated at Columbia University School of Law (JD 1982), Harvard University, John F. Kennedy School of Government (MPP 1979) and Brandeis University (BA in history 1977).

== Career ==
After law school and a clerkship with Judge Leonard I. Garth (U.S. Court of Appeals for the Third Circuit) Backer was in private practice in Los Angeles, California. Backer joined the Penn State Law faculty in 2000, after having served as professor of law and executive director of the Center for International and Comparative Law of the University of Tulsa College of Law. He has visited at the Tulane Law School (2007–2008), and the University of California, Hastings College of the Law (1998). Professor Backer has lectured and taught on public and private law aspects of globalization in a number of countries in Latin America, Asia and Europe. He founded and sponsors the Penn State Latina/o Law Students Association.

In 2006, Backer founded the Coalition for Peace and Ethics, an independent, non-profit, non-partisan, tax-exempt research and information focused organization based in Washington, D.C. As part of its research mission, CPE sponsors research oriented working papers, preliminary scientific or technical paper. The authors of these working papers have released them to share ideas about a topic or to elicit feedback before submitting to a peer-reviewed conference or academic journal. These working papers are preliminary versions that are being shared to a broad research community, with the aim of contributing to scholarly debate and soliciting constructive feedback.

Backer is also a member of the American Law Institute and the European Corporate Governance Institute. He served as the chair of the Penn State University Faculty Senate for 2012–2013.

== Scholarship ==
=== Constitutionalism ===
For his work on transnational constitutionalism, Backer has argued that after World War II, transnational constitutionalism embraced universal human rights as the core feature that emerged with the introduction of post-conflict German and Japanese constitutions. He also has examined the emergence of theocratic constitutionalism starting from the Iranian 1979 constitution. Backer argues that constitutionalism is the legal process in which each state harmonizes with international norms and laws. Backer is well known for his works on Chinese constitutionalism. According to Backer, China is evolving towards a "single party constitutionalist state" that is grounded in its unique form of "party-state constitutionalism." Backer argued that the Chinese constitutionalist state differs from the Western model in that the CCP plays a central role in the Chinese constitutional order. In order to articulate his conception of the Chinese "single-party constitutionalist state" as a new model of constitutionalist governance, Backer delineated the history for the Chinese state-party system that began from Mao Zedong, and was subsequently improved and strengthened through the works of Deng Xiaoping, Jiang Zemin, and Hu Jintao. Backer acknowledged that Mao Zedong Thought has had a profound impact on the shaping of China's constitutionalist system, especially in regard to the idea of the Party's role as an outsider. "The CCP was not merely a vanguard party, but for a long time a revolutionary party. Even after the end of the civil war, the CCP continued to think of itself as outside the apparatus." Therefore, in terms of the relationship between the CCP and the state, there was a lengthy process of internalization where the Party as an outsider became internalized into the state through its Mass Line.

=== Corporate and Transnational Law ===
Backer has also written extensively on the imposition of binding human rights norms on multinational corporations, where "the norms internationalize and adopt an enterprise liability model as the basis for determining the scope of liability for groups of related companies. This approach ... eliminates one of the greatest complaints about globalization through large webs of interconnected but legally independent corporations forming one large enterprise." Backer is also known for his work on the Sovereign Wealth Funds (SWFs), where he suggested that states have deployed their private global investments (SWFs) as instruments for public global governance.

== Bibliography ==
Gods Over Constitution: Transnational Constitutionalism in the 21st century (Surry, Eng.: Ashgate Publishing, forthcoming 2013) ISBN 978-0-7546-7859-5.

Lawyers Making Meaning: The Semiotics of Law in Legal Education II (Dordrecht: Springer, 2012) (with Jan M. Broekman). ISBN 978-9400754577.

Harmonizing Law in an Era of Globalization: Convergence, Divergence, Resistance (Durham, N.C.: Carolina Academic Press, 2007) ISBN 0-89089-585-6 (editor and contributor).

Comparative Corporate Law: United States, European Union, China and Japan (Durham, N.C.: Carolina Academic Press, 2002) ISBN 0-89089-526-0; LCCN 2001088034.

Multinational Corporations, Transnational Law: The United Nation's [sic] Norms on the Responsibilities of Transnational Corporations as Harbinger of Corporate Responsibility in International Law Columbia Human Rights Law Review, Vol. 37, 2005

Sovereign Wealth Funds as Regulatory Chameleons: The Norwegian Sovereign Wealth Funds and Public Global Governance Through Private Global Investment Georgetown Journal of International Law, Vol. 41, No. 2, 2009

The Rule of Law, the Chinese Communist Party, and Ideological Campaigns: Sange Daibiao (the 'Three Represents'), Socialist Rule of Law, and Modern Chinese Constitutionalism Journal of Transnational Law and Contemporary Problems, Vol. 16, No. 1, 2006

Multinational Corporations as Objects and Sources of Transnational Regulation ILSA Journal of International & Comparative Law, Vol. 14, No. 2, 2008

The Private Law of Public Law: Public Authorities as Shareholders, Golden Shares, Sovereign Wealth Funds, and the Public Law Element in Private Choice of Law Tulane Law Review, Vol. 82, No. 1, 2008
