= Brian Goree =

American lawyer

Judge of the Oklahoma Court of Civil Appeals
- Incumbent
- Assumed office August 2012
- Appointed by: Mary Fallin
- Preceded by: Carol Hansen

Personal details
- Born: March 18, 1964 (age 62) Killeen, Texas
- Spouse: Jill Goree
- Children: 4
- Education: University of Tulsa College of Law
- Occupation: attorney, judge
- Profession: law

Brian Goree (born March 18, 1964) is a Justice on the Oklahoma Court of Civil Appeals. Born in 1964 in Killeen, Texas, and raised in Tulsa, he graduated from the University of Oklahoma with a bachelor's degree in chemistry, then earned a J.D. degree at the University of Tulsa College of Law. After spending 23 years in private law practice, he was appointed to the court as Associate Justice. He won his retention election in 2014. Goree will appear on the ballot for judge retention in the 2024 general election.

== Early life ==
Goree was born in Killeen, Texas, on March 18, 1964, and raised in Tulsa, Oklahoma. He received a B. A. in chemistry from the University of Oklahoma in 1986, then earned a J.D. degree from the University of Tulsa College of Law in 1989. In 1989, he was admitted to practice in Oklahoma and US District Court, Northern, Eastern and Western Districts of Oklahoma; and registered to practice before the US Patent and Trademark Office.

== Career in private law practice ==
He began by specializing in litigation research and writing as an associate at Secrest, Hill and Butler. At Latham, Wagner, Steele and Lehman, a civil defense firm in Tulsa, he was the head of research and writing. His final private connection was with Toon Osmond PLLC, which he joined in January 2012. Altogether, he spent 23 years in private practice in Tulsa. He also volunteered with Tulsa Lawyers for Children.

== Career on the judicial bench ==
In August 2012, Governor Mary Fallin appointed Goree to the Oklahoma Court of Civil Appeals (OCCA), District 6, Office 2. He replaced Judge Carol Hansen, who had resigned in January. As required by law, he stood for retention in the 2014 election, and won a full 6-year term with 61.0 percent approval.

=== Landmark case ===
In 2015, a three-judge panel from the OCCA heard a case in which three minors sued 51 drug dealers in Tulsa County for damages they claimed had resulted from their mothers' marijuana use. (Note: Oklahoma's Drug Dealer Liability Act permits a person who is harmed by illegal drugs to recover civil damages from those who participate in the illegal drug market.) One of the defendants claimed the act unconstitutionally imposed liability for the harm without showing how his actions had harmed the plaintiff. After hearing the case, the panel rejected the suit by a vote of 2-1.

Presiding Judge Goree wrote the majority opinion, and Judge Buettner concurred. Judge Robert Bell dissented. Goree wrote that the dealer's conviction under the Comprehensive Drug Abuse Prevention and Control Act of 1970, sufficed as evidence of the harm caused by the dealer. The Supreme Court of the United States (SCOTUS) had previously recognized that,"... statutory presumptions in civil proceedings receive less scrutiny than statutory presumptions of criminal proceedings."

== Memberships ==
- Goree is a former president of the Appellate Practice Section of the Oklahoma Bar Association.
- Tulsa County and Oklahoma Bar Associations
- Oklahoma Association of Defense Counsel

He and his wife, Jill, have four children.

== See also ==
- Oklahoma Court of Civil Appeals
