= Robert D. Bell =

American justice

Judge of the Oklahoma Court of Civil Appeals
- Incumbent
- Assumed office June 2005
- Appointed by: Brad Henry

Chief Judge of the Oklahoma Court of Civil Appeals
- In office January 1, 2011 – December 31, 2011

Personal details
- Born: May 11, 1967 (age 59) Norman, Oklahoma
- Children: 2
- Education: University of Tulsa School of Law; Duke University School of Law

Robert D. Bell (born May 11, 1967) was born and raised in Norman, Oklahoma. He earned two law degrees, one in his home state and the second in North Carolina. He then spent 13 years in private practice in his hometown while also serving as a municipal judge in 5 towns and cities of Oklahoma. First appointed a judge in 1994, he was then the youngest sitting judge of any kind in the state. In 2005, he was appointed to fill a vacancy on the Oklahoma Court of Civil Appeals, a position he still holds to this after winning votes on retention in 2006, 2012 and 2018.

Bell's most notable ruling occurred in Ward & Lee, P.L.C. v. City of Claremore, where the appeals panel overturned a lower court decision because the police had refused to release the patrol car's dash-cam video of a DUI arrest. Judge Bell showed that the evidence in question was not exempted from the Open Records Act, as claimed by the police, and must be released on request.

== Early life and education ==
Robert D. Bell was born to Bobby and Jaynee Bell in Norman, Oklahoma on May 11, 1967, Raised in Norman, he graduated from Norman High School, then earned a Bachelor of Arts degree from the University of Oklahoma in 1989. He earned his Juris Doctor (J.D.) from the University of Tulsa College of Law in 1992. He earned an award in law school for distinguished service to the House of Delegates, in recognition of being elected to office all three years of school. Later, Bell also earned the LL.M. from the Duke University School of Law.

== Professional career ==
Bell returned to Norman, where he spent 13 years in private law practice. During that time, he also served as municipal judge for the cities of Blanchard, Broken Arrow, Moore, Noble and Purcell. He has also served as an adjunct professor for the University of Oklahoma College of Law since 1998 and Oklahoma City University School of Law since 2021.

Governor Brad Henry appointed Bell as a judge of the Oklahoma Court of Civil Appeals in June, 2005. (Note: The vacancy was created by the death of Judge Carl B. Jones in November, 2004.) He was retained in this office in the election of 2006. He was Chief Judge of the Oklahoma Court of Civil Appeals in 2011. He was retained as judge in the November 2012 election with a retain vote of 65.9 percent. He ran again for re-election in November 2018, and won retention with 61.9 percent of the vote.

=== Ward & Lee, P.L.C. v. City of Claremore ===
It often seems that appellate judges do not hear cases that result in opinions which may have lasting legal impacts. However, it seems that an exception occurred in the case Ward & Lee, P.L.C. v. City of Claremore 316 P.3d 225, which came before the OCCA on May 31, 2013. Robert D. Bell presided over the three-judge panel and wrote the majority opinion. The case was appealed after Judge Sheila A. Condren had ruled against Ward & Lee's client, Richard Stangland, who had been arrested for DUI by a Claremore Police Department (CPD) officer.

The core issue in this case was the refusal of the CPD to release the dash-cam video of the arrest (along with certain other items of evidence), so that Attorney Lee could present them at the lower court trial. CPD replied that it adhered to a policy written by Police Chief in 2011, stating that evidence such as dash cam videos and audios were not public records and must not be released for any reason without his specific approval. After reviewing the laws relevant to this topic, Judge Bell found that the CDP policy violated the Oklahoma Open Records Act, which specifically stated that such evidence constituted a public record and cannot be withheld."

This determination resulted in the Civil Appeals Court overturning the District Court verdict, which was directed to retry the case with the formerly missing evidence. The appeals verdict also noted that, "...any person denied access to a public record and who successfully brings a civil action for declarative or injunctive relief is entitled to reasonable attorney fees. Fabian, 2004 OK 67 at ¶ 19, 100 P.3d at 707." The appellate court further ordered the District Court to determine the "reasonable attorney's fees to which the appellant is entitled.

Judge Buettner concurred with Judge Bell. Judge Joplin dissented. No explanation of either vote is available. The 2-1 verdict was sufficient to win for the appellant.

== Personal ==
Judge Bell is a member of Christ the King Catholic Church in Oklahoma City. He is married and has two children.

== See also ==
- Oklahoma Court of Civil Appeals
