= Doug Combs =

American judge (born 1951)

Chief Justice of the Oklahoma Supreme Court
- In office December 1, 2016 – December 31, 2018
- Preceded by: John F. Reif
- Succeeded by: Noma Gurich

Justice of the Oklahoma Supreme Court
- Incumbent
- Assumed office January 1, 2011
- Appointed by: Brad Henry
- Preceded by: Rudolph Hargrave

Personal details
- Born: October 17, 1951 (age 75) Shawnee, Oklahoma, U.S.
- Education: St. Gregory's University (attended); University of Oklahoma (BA); Oklahoma City University (JD)

Douglas L. Combs (born October 17, 1951) is an associate justice of the Oklahoma Supreme Court. He was appointed by Governor Brad Henry to the Oklahoma Supreme Court, effective January 1, 2011, filling a vacancy created by the retirement of Justice Rudolph Hargrave. Combs was selected to become Chief Justice of the Oklahoma Supreme Court, effective December 1, 2016, and served until December 31, 2018.

== Early life ==
Combs was born on October 17, 1951, in Shawnee, Oklahoma, which he still considers home. Combs is also a member of the Muscogee Nation. Combs graduated from Shawnee High School in 1969. He attended St. Gregory's Junior College in Shawnee (now St. Gregory's University), and the University of Oklahoma to earn a bachelor's degree in political science in 1973. He earned his Juris Doctor from the Oklahoma City University School of Law in 1976 and was admitted to the bar the same year. Prior to taking the bench, Combs was in private practice, an assistant state attorney general and as a deputy clerk for the Oklahoma Supreme Court.

== Legal career ==
Combs has served as chief judge of the twenty-third judicial district and as the presiding judge of the North Central Administrative Judicial District. He served as a board member of the Oklahoma Judicial Conference from 2006 to 2010 and held the office of president of the Oklahoma Judicial Conference in 2009. Combs was appointed by Governor Brad Henry as Justice to the Supreme Court of Oklahoma on January 1, 2011. He served as district judge in the twenty-third judicial district from 2003 through 2010, and served as special district judge from 1995 to 2003. He has served as Vice Chief Justice for the term prior to being selected chief justice. He was selected by the court to become Chief Justice for a two-year term. Normally, his term would have begun on January 1, but Combs agreed to start on December 1, 2016, due to the early retirement of Chief Justice John Reif for health issues. Justice Noma Gurich replaced Combs as Vice Chief Justice in 2017.

== Personal life ==
Combs has been married to Janet Lea Combs for 42 years. She formerly owned and operated the Shawnee Ballet Company, a dance studio until her retirement in 2010. The Combs are members of St. Paul's Methodist Church of Shawnee. They have two adult children, Christopher and Eric, both attorneys.

Legal offices
Preceded by Rudolph Hargrave	Justice of the Oklahoma Supreme Court; 2011–present	Incumbent
Preceded by John F. Reif	Chief Justice of the Oklahoma Supreme Court; 2016–2018	Succeeded by Noma Gurich
