= Larry Joplin =

American judge (born 1946)

Larry E. Joplin

Justice of the Oklahoma Court of Civil Appeals
- Incumbent
- Assumed office November 1994
- Appointed by: David Walters
- Succeeded by: Trevor Pemberton

Personal details
- Born: August 9, 1946 (age 80) Oklahoma City
- Spouse: Susan Colley
- Children: 3
- Education: University of Oklahoma
- Profession: Law

Larry E. Joplin (born August 9, 1946) is an American judge currently serving on the Oklahoma Court of Civil Appeals. He was appointed to District 4, Office 2 by Governor David Walters in November 1994.

== Early life and education ==
After graduating from high school in Oklahoma City, Joplin enrolled in the University of Oklahoma, where he earned a B.A. degree. While in law school, he was selected as a participant in both Moot Court (Note: During his third year, his team placed third in the nation.) and the Oklahoma Law Review.

== Career in law ==
Joplin began his law career joining the firm of Pierce & Barth as an attorney from 1971 to 1973. He filled the same position at Bohannon & Barth from 1973 to 1976. He was appointed as special counsel for the Oklahoma County District Attorney's office from 1976 to 1978. He joined his own private partnership, Wheatley & Joplin, from 1978 to 1982. In 1982, he became a partner with Crowe & Dunlevy until 1993. He began working briefly for the State of Oklahoma in 1993 as director of its Washington D. C. office. He was appointed general counsel for the Oklahoma Department of Insurance from 1993 to November 1994, when Governor Walters appointed him to the Court of Civil Appeals.

Since his initial appointment, Joplin has been retained by voters in the 1996, 1998, 2004, 2010, and 2016 elections. In the 2016 election, 60.68 percent of the voters favored retaining Joplin. His current term expires January 8, 2023.

== Personal ==
Larry Joplin is married to Susan Colley. Susan is known professionally as Rev. Canon Susan Joplin, Priest in Charge of the St. Paul's Episcopal Church in Oklahoma City. They have three children.

== See also ==
- Oklahoma Court of Civil Appeals
