= Trevor Pemberton =

American attorney (born 1982)

Trevor Scott Pemberton

General counsel for the governor of Oklahoma
- In office October 15, 2021 – November 1, 2024
- Governor: Kevin Stitt
- Preceded by: Jason Reese
- Succeeded by: Benjamin Lepak

Judge of the Oklahoma Court of Civil Appeals
- In office August 24, 2020 – October 15, 2021
- Appointed by: Kevin Stitt
- Preceded by: Larry Joplin
- Succeeded by: Timothy Downing

Oklahoma County District Judge
- In office January 2018 – August 24, 2020
- Appointed by: Mary Fallin

Personal details
- Born: 1982 (age 43–44) Oklahoma City, Oklahoma
- Education: University of Oklahoma (B.A.); Oklahoma City University (J.D.)

Trevor Scott Pemberton (born 1982) is an American attorney and judge who served on the Oklahoma Court of Civil Appeals from 2020 to 2021 and as the general counsel for Oklahoma governor Kevin Stitt from 2021 to 2024. He currently serves as an attorney in private practice. He has been announced as a nominee to serve as a United States district judge of the United States District Court for the Eastern District of Oklahoma.

== Education ==
Born in 1982 in Oklahoma City, Oklahoma, Pemberton graduated with a Bachelor of Arts degree from the University of Oklahoma in 2005 and graduated with a Juris Doctor, cum laude, from the Oklahoma City University School of Law in 2008.

== Career ==
Pemberton served as an attorney in private practice after his law school graduation until his first appointment to the bench. Pemberton was appointed as a special judge for Oklahoma County in May 2017 and appointed by Governor Mary Fallin to fill a vacant district judge of Oklahoma County position in January 2018. He was appointed to the Oklahoma Court of Civil Appeals on August 24, 2020, by Governor Kevin Stitt to replace Judge Larry Joplin. He left the court on October 15, 2021, to serve as Stitt's general counsel, replacing Jason Reese. Pemberton announced he would leave Stitt's office staff on November 1, 2024, when Stitt announced Benjamin Lepak as his replacement. In March 2026 he was appointed to the Oklahoma State Regents for Higher Education by Stitt, replacing Dustin Hilliary. He is currently in private practice with the Pemberton Law Group.

=== Nomination to district court ===
On August 18, 2026, President Donald Trump announced his intention to nominate Pemberton to an undesignated seat on the United States District Court for the Eastern District of Oklahoma.

== Personal ==
Pemberton resides in Norman, Oklahoma.
