= Gregory Blackwell =

American attorney and judge

Judge of the Oklahoma Court of Civil Appeals
- Incumbent
- Assumed office July 21, 2021
- Appointed by: Kevin Stitt
- Preceded by: P. Thomas Thornbrugh

Personal details
- Education: University of Oklahoma

Gregory Blackwell is an American attorney and judge who has served on the Oklahoma Court of Civil Appeals since 2021.

== Biography ==
Gregory Blackwell earned both his bachelor's degree and juris doctor from the University of Oklahoma. He clerked for Judge Michael Mihm before starting with the U. S. Department of Justice Environment and Resource Division in 2005. He moved to Oklahoma City in 2008. After moving to Oklahoma City, he worked for Chesapeake Energy, Ball Morse Lowe, and as a staff attorney for Judge E. Bay Mitchell. He was appointed to the Oklahoma Court of Civil Appeals by Governor Kevin Stitt on July 21, 2021. He succeed P. Thomas Thornbrugh and won a retention election in 2022.
