= Janet K. Levit =

Professor and university provost

- Born: Janet Koven
- Other names: Janet Koven Levit, J. K. Levit
- Occupations: attorney, law professor, university administrator
- Known for: First woman president of the University of Tulsa; first woman dean of the University of Tulsa College of Law

Janet K. Levit née Koven is a professor at the University of Tulsa College of Law. She was the first woman to become dean of the law school, the first woman provost at the University of Tulsa, and the interim president of the University of Tulsa from June 2020 until June 2021, from the resignation of former president Gerard Clancy until the appointment of Brad Carson.

== Education ==
She enrolled in the Woodrow Wilson School of Public and International Affairs at Princeton University, where she earned the Bachelor of Arts (A.B.) in 1990. She then went to Yale University where she earned an M. A. in International Relations and her J.D. from Yale Law School, both in May 1994.

== Career ==
After graduating from Yale in 1994, she served as a law clerk for the chief judge of the U.S. Court of Appeals for the Tenth Circuit in Tulsa, Oklahoma, Stephanie K. Seymour from 1994 until 1995. She was employed at the Export-Import Bank of the United States from August 1998 until April 2000. In 2002, Levit became an assistant professor at University of Tulsa College of Law, where she was named professor in 2006. Levit was appointed Dean of the law school effective July 18, 2008; she was the first woman to hold that post, which she retained until 2015. In 2018 Levit became the first female provost at the University of Tulsa when she replaced Roger Blais. She served in that position until 2020; the position was then vacant until George Justice was appointed to succeed Levit in January 2022 by Brad Carson. A faculty vote of no-confidence in Levit was passed 157–44 in November 2019. Levit was the interim president of the University of Tulsa (TU) at Tulsa, Oklahoma from 2020 to 2021. During that time, University of Tulsa students passed a no-confidence resolution against her by a 805 to 264 margin. At the end of her term as interim president in 2021, she returned to the University of Tulsa College of Law faculty.

== Selected publications ==
- Levit, Janet Koven (1998–1999). "The Constitutionalization of Human Rights in Argentina: Problem or Promise". Columbia Journal of Transnational Law. 37: 281.
- Levit, Janet Koven (2004). "The Dynamics of International Trade Finance Regulation: The Arrangement on Officially Supported Export Credits". Harvard International Law Journal. 45: 65.
- Levit, Janet Koven (2007). "Bottom-up International Lawmaking: Reflections on the New Haven School of International Law". Yale Journal of International Law. 32: 393.
- Levit, Janet Koven. "A Bottom-Up Approach to International Lawmaking: The Tale of Three Trade Finance Instruments". The Globalization of International Law. doi:10.4324/9781315086392-36. ISBN 978-1-315-08639-2.

== Awards and honors ==
In 2017, Levit received the Anna C. Roth Legacy Award from the YWCA Tulsa and the Mayor's Commission on the Status of Women.
