= Carol Hansen =

Carol M. Hansen
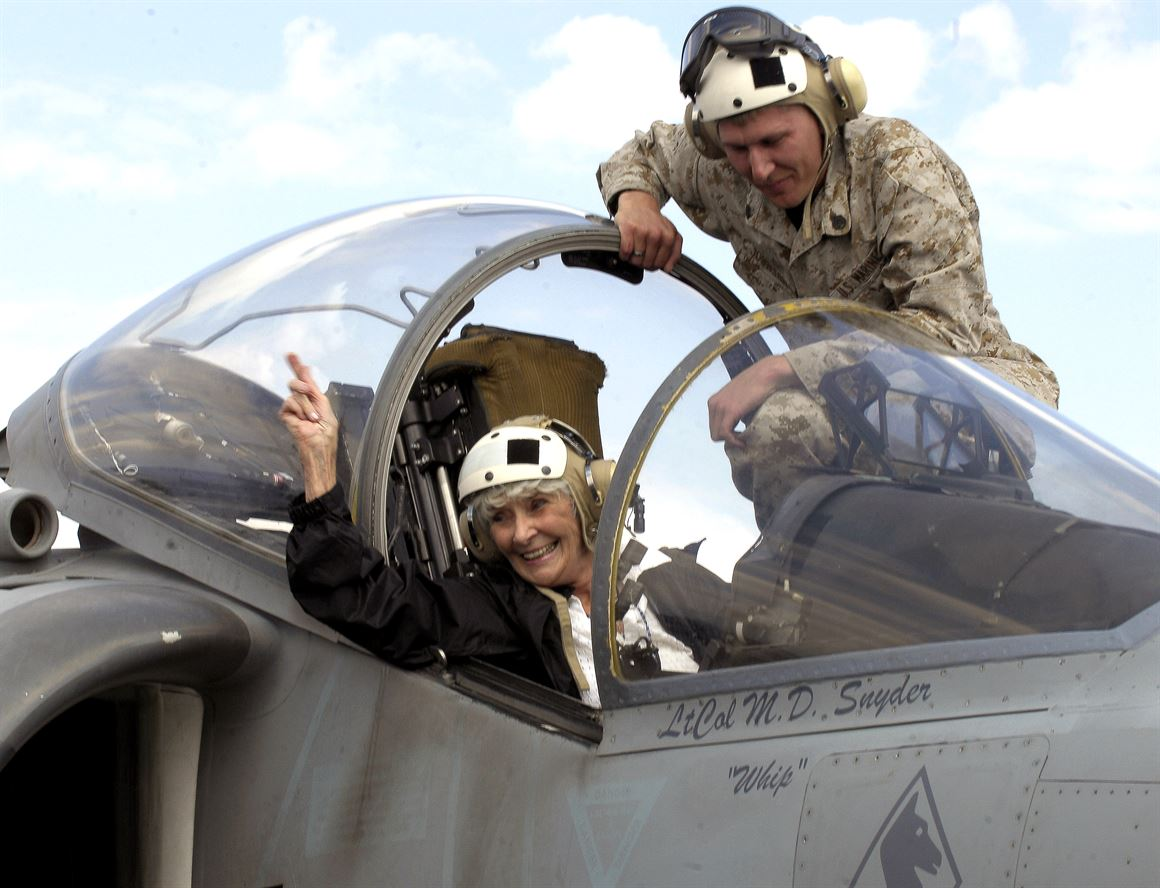

judge on the Oklahoma Court of Civil Appeals
- In office 1985–2012

Personal details
- Occupation: Attorney, judge
- Known for: first woman to serve as Chief Judge in any Oklahoma appellate court

Carol M. Hansen was a judge on the Oklahoma Court of Civil Appeals, the intermediate appellate court in the state of Oklahoma. Educated at the Oklahoma City University of Law after raising five children, she became a municipal judge in 1993. She was appointed marshal for the Oklahoma Supreme Court in 1984, then appointed as a justice of the Oklahoma Court of Appeals in 1985. She became the first woman to serve as Chief Judge in any Oklahoma appellate court. She resigned from the court in 2012, because health problems were causing her to lose her eyesight.

== Background and education ==
Judge Hansen was born in Oklahoma City. She married Paul Hansen (now deceased) and has five children. After raising five daughters, she returned to school and received her bachelor's and Juris Doctor degrees from Oklahoma City University in 1974. From 1975 to 1980, she worked as a legal assistant for Supreme Court Justice John Doolin. Then she worked for three years with Legal Aid of Western Oklahoma. When her husband was hired as coach for the Oklahoma State University basketball team, Judge Hansen began her career in 1983 as a municipal judge in Stillwater.

== Legal career ==
Judge Hansen became a marshal for the Oklahoma Supreme Court in 1984, and was then appointed to the Oklahoma Court of Civil Appeals by Governor George Nigh in July, 1985, replacing Judge Joe Young, who had resigned. The following year, she was retained by voters in a contested election. In 1993, she became the first woman to serve as Chief Judge in any Oklahoma appellate court.

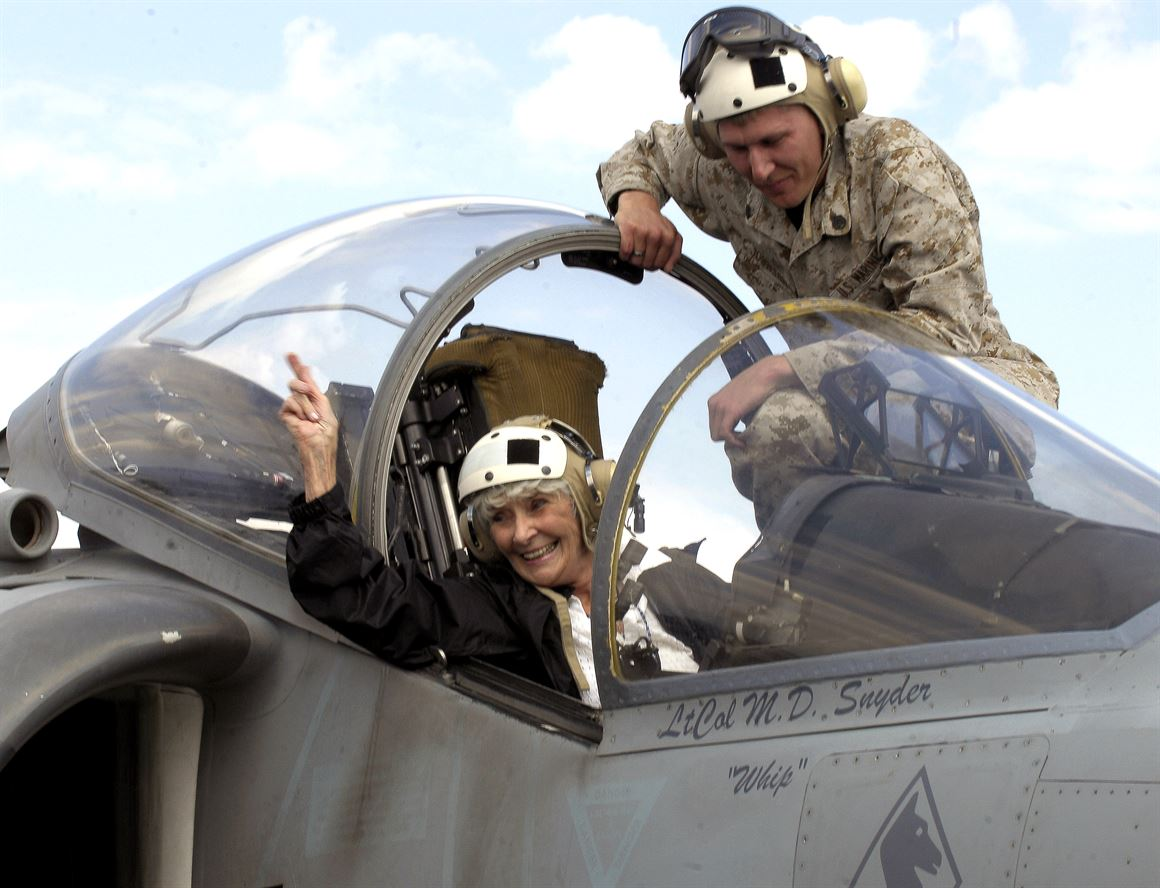
Judge Hansen visiting 76th Joint Civilian Orientation Conference, inside a Marine AV-8 Harrier aircraft aboard USS Iwo Jima, in Souda Bay, Greece, Sept. 21, 2008, on a seven-day trip through the European Command.

One high-profile case Hansen heard involved the firing of an Oklahoma City high school teacher, Joseph Quigley. He had been fired from his position at Northwest Classen High School in May, 2009, after school district officials alleged that he "... repeatedly neglected his duties and failed to follow school policies by both giving grades of zero and sending mass e-mails." Charging wrongful termination, Quigley argued that he had not neglected his duties, but had been singled out for termination because he was an advocate for gay, lesbian, bisexual and transgender rights. The case was heard in district court before Oklahoma County District Judge Barbara Swinton in September, 2009. Judge Swinton ruled in favor of Quigley and ordered that the school district reinstate him. He was given an teaching position at U. S. Grant High School, while the district appealed to the Court of Civil Appeals. The appeal was heard by Justice Carol M. Hansen on October 6, 2010. Justice Hansen upheld the lower court's ruling.

On August 20, 2012, Governor Mary Fallin announced that she had appointed Brian Goree to the Oklahoma Court of Civil Appeals District 6, Office 2. Goree would replace Judge Carol Hansen, who had resigned. The reason for Hansen's resignation was not published at the time, but a later article about the non-profit Independent Transportation Network (ITN) revealed that Judge Hansen had experienced such severe vision problems that she felt it necessary to leave the court, but also to give up driving a car.

== Memberships ==
- American Judicature Society,
- American, Oklahoma and Oklahoma County bar associations
- Dispute Resolution Advisory Board
- Ginsburg Inn of Court

Judge Hansen is also a trustee of Oklahoma City University and an Oklahoma Bar Foundation Fellow.
