= University of Tulsa College of Law =

Private law school in Tulsa, Oklahoma, US

Coordinates: 36°09′16″N 95°56′38″W

The University of Tulsa College of Law
- Established: 1923
- School type: Private
- Dean: Marc Roark
- Location: Tulsa, Oklahoma, United States
- Enrollment: 280
- Faculty: 28 (full-time)
- USNWR ranking: 120th (2026)
- Website: law.utulsa.edu

The University of Tulsa College of Law is the law school of the University of Tulsa, a private research university in Tulsa, Oklahoma. Established in 1923, it was originally known as the Tulsa Law School and become absorbed by the University of Tulsa in 1943.

== History ==
The University of Tulsa College of Law was founded by local attorneys during one of Tulsa's oil booms in 1923 with Washington E. Hudson, a state senator and Ku Klux Klan leader, serving as dean from 1923 to 1943. The law school was originally known simply as the Tulsa Law School and was independent of the University of Tulsa. Initially, classes took place in the Central High School building in downtown Tulsa, while the law library was in the Tulsa County courthouse, a few blocks away. The faculty initially consisted of practicing Tulsa attorneys who taught classes at night.

Tulsa Law was formally absorbed by the University of Tulsa in 1943. A pioneering Tulsa attorney named John Rogers is credited with making this association. In 1949, the school moved into a downtown office building. In 1953, the school was accredited by the American Bar Association. During the 1950s and 60s, the library, classrooms and administrative offices were consolidated at a single location in downtown Tulsa and full-time tenured and tenure-track research faculty were hired. The school became a member of the Association of American Law Schools in 1966. The name of the school was formally changed to the University of Tulsa College of Law.

In the late 1970s, the Energy Law Journal and the National Energy and Law Policy Institute were established at the law school (NELPI). The National Energy Law and Policy Institute was initially led by Kent Frizzell, who had served as Assistant Attorney General of the United States from 1972 to 1973 and Undersecretary of the Department of the Interior from 1975 to 1977. During this time, Frizzell also taught at Tulsa Law.

== Law school building ==
Tulsa Law moved from downtown Tulsa to its present location on the University of Tulsa's main campus in 1973, where it was housed in what was then named John Rogers Hall. The building was formally dedicated with a speech by U.S. Supreme Court Justice William Rehnquist.

In May 2016, the university decided to remove the name of John Rogers from the law school's building, in response to increased controversy about Rogers' role in the founding of the Ku Klux Klan in Tulsa in the 1920s.

== Employment ==
According to TU Law's 2021 ABA-required disclosures, 91.6% of the Class of 2016 obtained full-time, long-term positions for which bar passage was required (75%) or for which a J.D. was an advantage (16.6%) nine months after graduation, excluding solo practitioners and clerkships, putting TU in the middle of regional peers like Baylor Law School, the University of Oklahoma College of Law, and SMU Dedman School of Law.

== Costs ==
The total cost of attendance (indicating the cost of tuition, fees, and living expenses) at TU Law for the 2015–2016 academic year is $58,496 (full-time). 100% of TU Law students received scholarships and/or tuition benefits in 2015.

The Law School Transparency estimated debt-financed cost of attendance for three years is $201,183 (however this figure does not account for merit- or need-based aid).

== Notable faculty ==
The notable current and former faculty of TU Law include:

- Larry Catá Backer – Cuban-American scholar of comparative law and international affairs
- Daniel J. Boudreau - Oklahoma Supreme Court justice
- Robert Butkin – Law professor, former Dean of Tulsa Law, and former State Treasurer of Oklahoma
- Brad Carson – former U.S. Representative from Oklahoma and Under Secretary of the Army
- Nancy Feldman – Civil rights activist and community leader
- Paul Finkelman – Legal historian (Finkelman was listed as one of the ten most-cited legal historians in Brian Leiter's survey of most-cited law professors by specialty from 2000 to 2007)
- Kent Frizzell – United States Under Secretary of the Interior (1975–1977) and Attorney General of Kansas (1969–1971)
- Summers T. Hardy - Oklahoma Supreme Court justice
- F. Russell Hittinger – Legal philosopher and Catholic theologian, member of the Pontifical Academy of Social Sciences
- Sven Erik Holmes – General Counsel of KPMG, former Federal District Judge for Northern District of Oklahoma.
- Janet K. Levit – joined law faculty as professor in 1995. She was promoted to dean of TU College of Law in 2017, then became Provost and vice president of TU. Served as Interim President of TU, July 2020 – January 2022, then returned to her previous duties.
- John S. Lowe – Energy law scholar
- Joseph Wilson Morris – Federal District Judge for the Eastern District of Oklahoma, former General Counsel for Shell Oil Company
- Marian P. Opala, Oklahoma Supreme Court Justice
- Frank Pommersheim – scholar of Native American Law; serves as the Chief Justice for the Cheyenne River Sioux Tribal Court of Appeals
- Melissa L. Tatum – Scholar of Native American law

== Deans ==
No.	Name	Took office	Left office
1	Washington E. Hudson	1923	1943
2	Summers Hardy	1943	1949
3	John Rogers	1949	1957
4	Allen King	1958	1962
5	Bruce Peterson	1962	1969
6	Edgar Wilson	1969	1972
7	Joseph Wilson Morris	1972	1974
8	Rennard Strickland (acting)	1974	1975
9	Frank T. Read	1975	1979
10	Tom L. Holland (acting)	1979	1980
11	Frank L. Walwer	1980	1991
12	John Makdisi	1991	1994
13	M. Thomas Arnold (acting)	1994	1995
14	Martin H. Belsky	1995	2004
15	Catherine Cullem (acting)	2004	2005
16	Robert Butkin	2005	2007
17	Janet K. Levit	2007	2015
18	Lyn Entzeroth	2015	2021
19	Elizabeth McCormick (acting)	2021	2022
20	Oren Griffin	2022	2025
21	Marc Roark (acting)	2005	present

== Notable alumni ==
Alumni	Class	Occupation	Distinction
Robert D. Bell	1992	Lawyer/Appellate Judge	Justice on the Oklahoma Court of Civil Appeals
Daniel J. Boudreau	1976	Lawyer/Appellate Judge	Justice on the Oklahoma Supreme Court
Bill Carmody (lawyer)	1988	Lawyer	Partner at Susman Godfrey LLP
Samuel H. Cassidy	1975	Politician/Lawyer	Lieutenant Governor of Colorado 1994–1995, Professor at University of Denver
John E. Dowdell	1981	Federal Judge/Lawyer	United States District Judge on the United States District Court for the Northern District of Oklahoma.
Angelique EagleWoman	2004 (LLM)	Scholar/Lawyer/Law School Dean	Dean of Canada's Bora Laskin Faculty of Law; Scholar of Native American Law
Drew Edmondson	1979	Lawyer/Politician	16th Attorney General of Oklahoma from 1995 to 2011.
Allison Garrett	1987	Attorney/Educator	Chancellor of Oklahoma State Regents for Higher Education (2021–present); former President of Emporia State University (2016–2021); former Walmart Vice President/Legal Counsel.
Tina Glory-Jordan	1981	Judge/Politician	Justice, Cherokee Nation Supreme Court (2023–present); Cherokee Nation Secretary of State (2019–2023); Cherokee Nation Tribal Councilor (2007–2015)
Ross Goodman	1995	Lawyer	High-profile criminal defense lawyer in Las Vegas
Brian Jack Goree	1989	Attorney	Judge, Oklahoma Court of Civil Appeals (2012–present)
David Hall (Oklahoma governor) (Note: Deceased)	1959	Politician	Governor of Oklahoma (1971–1975)
John F. Heil III	1994	Federal Judge	Formerly shareholder of Hall Estill; now a United States district judge of the United States District Court for the Eastern District of Oklahoma, the United States District Court for the Northern District of Oklahoma, and the United States District Court for the Western District of Oklahoma.
Sara E. Hill	2003	Federal Judge	United States district judge of the United States District Court for the Northern District of Oklahoma.
Stacie L. Hixon	2002	Oklahoma Court of Civil Appeals	Appointed to state Civil Appeals court in March 2020; previously worked for private law practices in Tulsa.
Fern Holland	1996	Human Rights Lawyer	Human rights advocate and investigator known for her work with the Coalition Provisional Authority in Iraq
Dana Kuehn	1996	Judge	Oklahoma Supreme Court Formerly Court of Criminal Appeals’ presiding judge; appointed to Oklahoma Supreme Court July 2001.
Brian Kuester	2000	Lawyer	United States Attorney for the Eastern District of Oklahoma
Bill LaFortune	1983	Politician/Lawyer	Mayor of Tulsa
Orville Edwin Langley	1940	Federal Judge and US Attorney	United States District Judge on the United States District Court for the Eastern District of Oklahoma, United States Attorney for the Eastern District of Oklahoma from 1961 to 1965
Robert E. Lavender	1953	Appellate Judge	Justice on the Oklahoma Supreme Court (1965 - 2007)
Stacy Leeds	1997	Scholar/Judge/Law School Dean	President of the University of Tulsa
Mark McCullough	1998	Politician	Oklahoma State Representative (2007–2017)
Michael Mulligan	1987	Attorney/Prosecutor	Lead prosecutor in the courts-martial of Hasan Akbar and of Nidal Malik Hasan, the sole accused in the November 2009 Fort Hood shooting.
John M. O'Connor	1980	Lawyer/Politician	19th Attorney General of Oklahoma (2021–2023).
Charles L. Owens	1960	Judge	First African-American judge in Oklahoma and Supreme Court lawyer
Elizabeth Crewson Paris	1987	Federal Judge	Judge of the United States Tax Court and adjunct instructor at Georgetown University Law Center
Layn R. Phillips	1977	Federal Judge and attorney	Former United States District Judge on the United States District Court for the Western District of Oklahoma, former United States Attorney for the Northern District of Oklahoma from 1984 to 1987, and former partner at Irell & Manella.
Scott Pruitt	1993	Politician/Lawyer	Attorney General of Oklahoma (2011–2017); former Administrator of the U.S. Environmental Protection Agency
Rodger Randle	1979	Politician/Academic	Mayor of Tulsa (1988–1992); President pro tempore of the Oklahoma Senate; President of predecessor to Rogers State University
Keith Rapp	1984	Appellate Judge	
John F. Reif	1977	Judge (Retired - 2019)	Justice on the Oklahoma Supreme Court (2007 - 2019)
Clinton Riggs	1954	Law Enforcement educator and inventor	Law Enforcement educator and innovator, inventor of the first Yield sign
Scott J. Silverman	1981	Judge	Dade County Court judge (1991–1998); circuit court judge 11th Judicial Circuit in and for Miami-Dade County, Florida (1998–2012)
Robert D. Simms	1950	Attorney/Judge	Justice on the Oklahoma Supreme Court (1985 - 1999)
Chad "Corntassel" Smith	1980	Politician	Principal Chief of the Cherokee Nation (1999–2011)
Clancy Smith	1980	Retired judge	Justice of Oklahoma Court of Criminal Appeals (2010–2017)
Jerry L. Smith	1970	Politician	Oklahoma State Representative (1973–1981) and Senator (1981–2004)
Burt Solomons	1978	Real estate and construction attorney	Texas State Representative from 1995 to 2013 from Denton County
Geoffrey Standing Bear	1980	Politician	Principal Chief of Osage Nation (2014–Present)
Leigh H. Taylor	1966	Law professor, law school dean, and civil rights attorney	Former Dean of Southwestern Law School and Dean of Claude W. Pettit College of Law at Ohio Northern University
Stratton Taylor	1982	Politician	Oklahoma State Representative (1979–1981) and Senator (1981–2007)
P. Thomas Thornbrugh	1974	Lawyer and judge	Judge on the Oklahoma Court of Civil Appeals
Mike Turpen	1974	Lawyer and politician	Attorney General of Oklahoma (1983–1987), chair of Oklahoma Democratic Party
Jane Wiseman (judge)	1973	Appellate Judge	Judge on Oklahoma Court of Civil Appeals
Harry M. Wyatt III	1980	Military	Director, Air National Guard, the Pentagon, Washington, DC (2009–2013)
