= James P. Garrett =

American politician

Justice of the Oklahoma Court of Civil Appeals
- Succeeded by: E. Bay Mitchell

Personal details
- Born: January 5, 1922 Mangum, Oklahoma, U.S.
- Died: October 16, 2015 (aged 93) Oklahoma City, Oklahoma, U.S.
- Party: Democratic
- Spouse: Nedra Lee Wilson
- Children: 3
- Education: Oklahoma University Law School
- Occupation: Law enforcement, attorney, judge
- Profession: Law

James P. Garrett (January 5, 1922 – October 16, 2015), usually known as "Jim" or "Judge", was the third child born to Wilkins B. Garrett and Willie M. Latimer Garrett in Mangum, Oklahoma. Raised in Mangum, he graduated from Mangum High School and the Oklahoma University (OU) School of Business. He enlisted in the U.S. Navy during World War II, was promoted to lieutenant, and saw action during the invasion of Normandy. After returning from the war, He enrolled in the Oklahoma University Law School, where he earned the Juris Doctor (J. D. degree). Thereafter, his career seemed connected with some form of law enforcement,

== Career ==
Garrett started his career practicing law in Mangum. The family has long had roots in Mangum's law enforcement history. Jim's grandfather, Seaborn B. Garrett, practiced law there when Mangum was part of "Old Greer County", in the Texas Panhandle, years before Oklahoma became a state. Wilkins B. was the District Judge for Greer County, Oklahoma, after statehood.

During the 1960s, Garrett was on the Oklahoma Pardon & Parole Board. He was Assistant District Attorney for Carter County, Oklahoma, Assistant State Attorney General, working under Mac Q. Williamson, and District Attorney General for Southwestern Oklahoma. In 1987, he was appointed judge on the Oklahoma Court of Civil Appeals, where he remained until his retirement on December 31, 2001.

== Family ==
Judge Garrett was the last of three children, and became the patriarch of a rather large extended family. It started with his late wife, Nedra (nee Wilson), with whom he had three children, son Stephen (better known as Steve and who is now deceased), daughters Linda Garrett Ellason (married to Lee Ellason) and Susan Garrett Christian (and spouse Leon Christian), and Steve Garrett's widow, Linda Garrett. Then there are nine grandchildren, sixteen great grandchildren and one great, great grandchild.

== Activities ==
Life was not all about "crime and punishment" for Jim and Nedra. They both loved to go dancing, and the judge was especially proud of his talent at doing the jitterbug. Both were said to be master bridge players. He was also noted for his love of gardening and producing peanut brittle for the winter holidays.

== Organization memberships ==
The judge belonged to both First Baptist Church in Mangum, where he also served as Deacon, and a member of Village Baptist Church in Oklahoma City.

He also belonged to:

- Oklahoma Toastmasters Club
- Rotary International
- Kiwanis International
- BPOE
- 32nd Degree Mason, 33rd Degree Scottish Rite, and a Shriner
- Democratic Party of Oklahoma (He represented the State of Oklahoma at a Democratic National Convention.)

== Death ==
Judge Garrett died October 16, 2015, in Oklahoma City. A memorial service was held October 23, 2015, at St. John's Episcopal Church in Oklahoma City. Interment was in Mangum.

== See also ==
- Oklahoma Court of Civil Appeals

Party political offices
Preceded by Charles R. Nesbitt	Democratic nominee for Attorney General of Oklahoma; 1966	Succeeded by Larry Derryberry
