= Stacie L. Hixon =

American judge

Stacie Hixon

Judge of the Oklahoma Court of Civil Appeals
- Incumbent
- Assumed office March 10, 2020
- Appointed by: Kevin Stitt
- Preceded by: Jerry Goodman

Personal details
- Born: Owasso, Oklahoma, U.S.
- Education: Oklahoma State University–Stillwater (BA, MA); University of Tulsa (JD)

Stacie Hixon is an American attorney and jurist serving as a judge on the Oklahoma Court of Civil Appeals. Governor Kevin Stitt appointed her on March 10, 2020 to replace Jerry Goodman.

== Early life and education ==
Hixon was born and raised in Tulsa, Oklahoma. She earned a Bachelor of Arts and Master of Arts from Oklahoma State University–Stillwater, followed by a Juris Doctor from the University of Tulsa College of Law. (Note: Ballotpedia states that she received her J. D. from the University of Oklahoma College of Law in 2002, but this contradicts with biographical information from a former employer (Steidley & Neal) and from U.S. News & World Report.)

== Career ==
At the time of her appointment, Hixon was a partner at the Steidley & Neal law firm, which has offices in Tulsa, McAlester and Durant, and has focused on areas that include insurance, product liability, employment law and general civil litigation. She replaced Jerry Goodman, who had already retired from the bench.
