= John Fischer (judge) =

American judge

Justice of the Oklahoma Court of Civil Appeals
- Incumbent
- Assumed office May, 2006
- Appointed by: Brad Henry

Personal details
- Born: 1948 (age 77–78) Stillwater, Oklahoma
- Education: University of Oklahoma
- Occupation: Attorney, judge
- Profession: Law

John Fischer (born 1948) is a judge on the Oklahoma Court of Civil Appeals, the intermediate appellate court in the state of Oklahoma.

== Background and education ==
Judge John Fischer was born in Stillwater, Oklahoma. Fischer earned his undergraduate, masters, and law degrees from the University of Oklahoma. Both his bachelor and master degrees were in English literature. He received his Juris Doctor (J.D.) from the University of Oklahoma College of Law in 1975. He was appointed to the court in May, 2006 by Governor Brad Henry.

While in law school, Fischer won the Liberty National Bank Scholarship, was named a member of the Dean's Honor Roll and became a Faculty Honor Student.

== Law career ==
Fischer began his career with public service in 1976, as Oklahoma Assistant Attorney General, but entered private law practice in 1980, where he remained until 2006. Meanwhile, he was elected as one of the Best Lawyers in America in commercial litigation.

He was appointed to the court in May, 2006 by Governor Brad Henry. In 2011, he was named the Appellate Judge of the Year.

Fischer was retained by the voters of Oklahoma as a judge of the Court of Civil Appeals at the 2008 and 2010 general elections. He last stood for retention in 2016, when he won retention with 60.42 percent of the vote. In 2010, he won retention with a 62.74 percent of the vote. His next scheduled retention vote is January 8, 2023.

== Awards and honors ==
- He is admitted to the bar in the courts of Oklahoma, the United States Supreme Court and various other federal courts.
- He is a Master of the Bench and past president of the William J. Holloway American Inn of Court.
- He is a member of the Oklahoma and American Bar Associations, Oklahoma Judicial Conference, the American Law Institute, a Fellow of the American and Oklahoma Bar Foundations and the past Oklahoma representative to the United States Court of Appeals for the 10th Circuit Advisory Committee.

== Family ==
He and his wife have been married for 44 years, and they have two daughters.
