= Sandra Mitchell (UNRWA) =

UN official (born 1962)

Sandra Mitchell was appointed Deputy Commissioner-General of the United Nations Relief and Works Agency for Palestine Refugees in the Near East (UNRWA) from 2014 until 2020 when her contract was fully performed

== Biographical information ==
Prior to her appointment of 31 December 2014, Mitchell served as the Vice-President of International Programs of the International Rescue Committee (IRC). From 2011 to 2013, she held senior positions with UNRWA. Prior to that, she worked with the United Nations in Kosovo as Chief Humanitarian Officer. In addition to working in the field of international peacekeeping, Mitchell has several years of experience in the legal field, and with international organizations]. From 2002 to 2004, she held the position of Vice President for Government Relations and Advocacy with the IRC.

In 2019, Mitchell was among the primary subjects of an internal U.N. report alleging wrongdoing and abuses at the UNRWA; the report was leaked to Al Jazeera. According to the report, Mitchell allegedly twice in 2018 improperly attempted to secure a promotion for her husband. Mitchell denied the claim to Al Jazeera.
