= Oklahoma Judicial Nominating Commission =

The Oklahoma Judicial Nominating Commission is the judicial nominating commission of the U.S. state of Oklahoma. It selects potential justices and judges for gubernatorial appointments for judges for state appellate courts.

== History ==
At the adoption of the Oklahoma Constitution in 1907, the Governors had the power to appoint, with Senate approval, anyone they wanted to any position within the judicial system that required gubernatorial appointment. This power extended to District Judges, Judges of the Oklahoma Court of Criminal Appeals, as well Justices of the Oklahoma Supreme Court. However, during the 1960s, a growing desire to restrain the Governor's executive power allowed for the adoption of a new method of selecting the judges and justices of the state's highest courts.

On July 11, 1967, the Oklahoma Constitution was amended by State Question 447. 447 added Article 7B to the Constitution and created the Judicial Nominating Commission, originally consisting of 13 members. State Question 752 (adopted by the voters on November 2, 2010) amended the article by adding two additional members.

== Powers ==
The new method mandated by Article 7B states that in the event of a vacancy, for whatever reason, within the Oklahoma Supreme Court, the Oklahoma Court of Criminal Appeals, or the Oklahoma Court of Civil Appeals, the Commission screens a list of applicants that desire that job. Next, the Commission selected three qualified nominees and presents the names to the Governor. The Governor may then appoint one of the nominees to position with further approval not necessary. If the Governor fails to appoint a nominee to the position within sixty days, the Chief Justice of Oklahoma may make the selection.

The Commission's power only extends to Oklahoma's appellate courts. It can not influence the other judicial candidates. However, should there be an unexpected vacancy within the District Courts, the Commission may provide the same service as it does for the higher courts.

The majority of Commission is "sufficient to decide any question", unless otherwise specified by the Constitution. The Commission has jurisdiction to determine whether the qualifications of nominees to hold a judicial position have been met and to determine the existence of vacancies on the Commission.

== Membership ==
The commission currently consists of 13 members: six appointed by the governor, six selected by the Oklahoma Bar Association, and the thirteenth selected at large by the other twelve. Of the six gubernatorial appointees, each one must come from a different Congressional District (as those districts existed in Oklahoma in 1967) and none are allowed to be a licensed attorney in Oklahoma. The 13th member is selected by an eight-member majority, must not be a licensed attorney in Oklahoma or any state, but must be a resident of Oklahoma. In the event that the commission can not reach a majority within thirty days, the governor may select the at-large member.

State Question 752 amended the Commission by adding two more at-large members. One member will be appointed by the Speaker of the Oklahoma House of Representatives while the other will be appointed by the President Pro Tempore of the Oklahoma Senate. The members may come from anywhere in Oklahoma and cannot be licensed attorneys.

Each member serves a staggered six-year term. No person is eligible to immediately succeed themselves.

=== Chairmanship ===
The Chairman of the Commission is selected by its own members to serve for a one-year term.

=== Restrictions ===
Of the members selected by the governor, no more than three may belong to the same political party. All commissioners serve without pay, but are compensated for travel expenses. No commissioner, while a member of the commission, is allowed to hold any other public office by election or appointment. They may not serve as any official within a political party and are not eligible for nomination to a judicial position by the Commission. This restriction applies as long as the commissioner is a part of the commission and for five years after their term is over.

== See also ==
- Judicial nominating commission
