= P. Thomas Thornbrugh =

American lawyer

Justice of the Oklahoma Court of Civil Appeals
- In office September 1, 2011 – 2021
- Appointed by: Mary Fallin
- Preceded by: Doug Gabbard II
- Succeeded by: Gregory Blackwell

Personal details
- Born: Garnett, Kansas
- Spouse: Dr. Jean Thornbrugh
- Children: 5
- Education: Emporia State University (B. A. Speech) 1968; University of Tulsa College of Law (Juris Doctor) 1974
- Occupation: Judge of Oklahoma Court of Civil Appeals
- Profession: Law

P. Thomas (Tom) Thornbrugh (Note: A document published by Emporia State shows that the initial P. stands for Paul.) is a judge on the Oklahoma Court of Civil Appeals. He was born in Garnett, Kansas. He graduated in 1968 from Emporia State University with a B. A. in speech, then enlisted in the U.S. Army. He was trained at Fort Benning, Georgia, then went to Vietnam, where he served with the 1st ARVN Division, and the 1st Signal Brigade at Khe Sanh during the 1971 Laotion invasion. He was honored with the Bronze Star and the Army Commendation Medal with Oak Leaf Cluster for his actions at Khe Sanh. He received an honorable discharge in 1971, and returned to the United States.

Deciding to pursue a civilian career in law, Thornbrugh earned a Juris Doctor degree from the University of Tulsa in 1974, followed by an opportunity to work on the Washington staff of Senator Dewey Bartlett. He entered private practice in Oklahoma for 20 years, then was appointed as a District Judge. In 1997, he was appointed to the Oklahoma Court of Civil Appeals. He has since stood for retention three times. Once, he had no opposition, and twice he was opposed, but won retention with approvals exceeding 60 percent.

Thornbrugh's legal career is notable for at least two reasons: One, his colleagues and peers voted him Trial Judge of the Year in 2011; Second, he discovered that the defendant in one case (Helmerich & Payne) had substantially underreported its interest and profits, allowing the defendant to withhold millions of dollars from royalty owners and investors. The court concurred and forced payment to the rightful owners.

== Education and early legal career ==
Thornbrugh enrolled in the University of Tulsa College of Law. While at Tulsa, he was on the Dean's Honor Roll and Res Nova law review. After graduating from law school in 1974, he went to work in Washington, D.C., on the staff of Senator Dewey F. Bartlett (R-OK) for three years. Returning to his home state, he had a private law practice in Oklahoma for the next 20 years.

== On the bench ==
Governor Frank Keating appointed him as a district judge for the 14th Judicial District in 1997. (Note: The 14th District includes Tulsa County, which meant that he served as Municipal Court Judge for the cities of Tulsa and Bixby.) During the next 15 years, his colleagues elected him as Presiding Judge of the District, President of the Assembly of Presiding Judges and as a member of the Oklahoma Judicial Conference Executive Committee. the Oklahoma Association for Justice named him Trial Judge of the Year in 2011.

Judge Thornbrugh is an adjunct professor at the University of Tulsa School of Law.

== A significant decision ==
A notable decision made by Judge Thornbrugh in 2009, occurred during review of a case between Tulsa-based energy services company, Helmerich & Payne (H&P), and oil royalty owners in Beckham County, Oklahoma, in which the trial court had ordered H&P to pay the royalty owners $68.5 million in damages. (Note: The case had been filed in the trial court 1998.) The judgement was appealed, and came before Judge Thornbrugh, who determined that the previous award was erroneous because, "... the jury had under-calculated the amount of interest and profits the energy company had made." He asserted the proper award should be $126 million.

Thornbrugh filed for retention in the 2010 election. He was automatically returned to the bench because no one ran against him.

Governor Mary Fallin appointed Judge Thornbrugh to fill a vacancy on the Oklahoma Court of Civil Appeals in September 2011. The judge ran again in 2012. This time he had opposition, but was retained with approval of 67.3 percent of the voters. Voters retained him again in 2016 with 61.04 percent approving.

== Personal ==
Judge Thornbrugh is married to Dr. Jean Thornbrugh, who is Dean of the College for Working Adults at St. Gregory's University. The couple have five adult children.

== Honors ==
Thornbrugh was one of four graduates named as 2013 Distinguished Alumni by Emporia State University.

== See also ==
- Oklahoma Court of Civil Appeals
