= Noma Gurich =

American judge (born 1952)

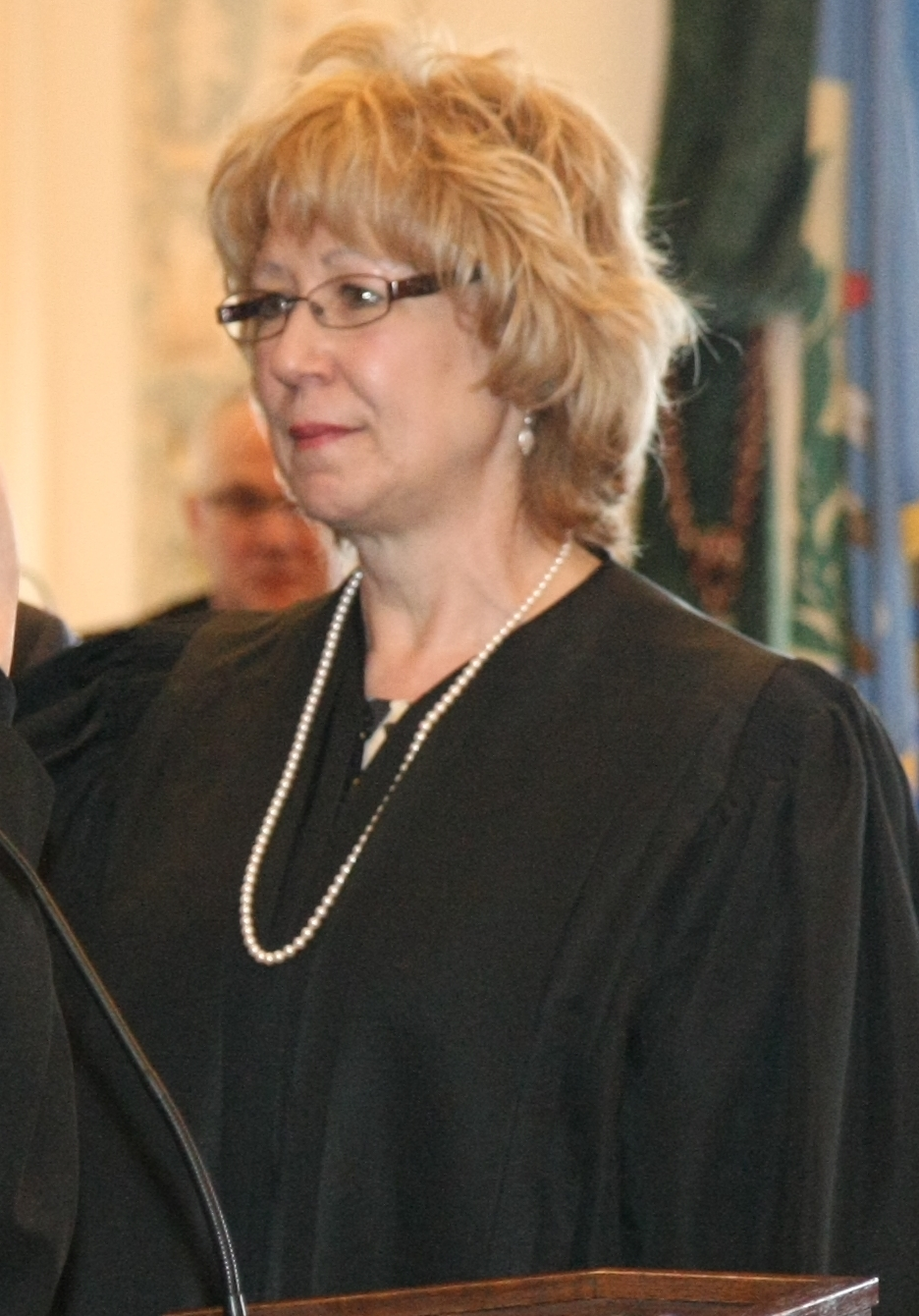

Chief Justice of the Oklahoma Supreme Court
- In office January 1, 2019 – December 31, 2020
- Preceded by: Doug Combs
- Succeeded by: Richard Darby

Justice of the Oklahoma Supreme Court
- Incumbent
- Assumed office February 15, 2011
- Appointed by: Brad Henry
- Preceded by: Marian P. Opala

Personal details
- Born: September 26, 1952 (age 74) South Bend, Indiana, U.S.
- Education: Indiana State University (BS); University of Oklahoma (JD)

Noma D. Gurich (born September 26, 1952) is an American attorney and jurist who is serving as an associate justice of the Oklahoma Supreme Court. Gurich was appointed the State's highest court by Governor Brad Henry in 2010 and assumed office on February 15, 2011. Gurich was appointed to the Court following the death of long-time Justice Marian P. Opala. Gurich is the third woman in state history after Alma Wilson and Yvonne Kauger to be appointed to the Supreme Court.

== Early life, education, and family ==
Gurich was born on September 26, 1952, in South Bend, Indiana. She received a bachelor's degree in political science in 1975 from Indiana State University and a Juris Doctor from the University of Oklahoma College of Law in 1978. While at OU she served as the editor of the American Indian Law Review. Gurich is married to John E. Miley, an attorney with Legal Aid. Justice Gurich and her husband have been married for 36 years.

== Workers Compensation and District Court ==
She was a lawyer in private practice in Oklahoma City ten years later when Republican governor Henry Bellmon appointed her to serve as a member of the Judiciary of Oklahoma, serving as a judge of the Oklahoma Workers' Compensation Court. She was reappointed for a second term to that court by Democratic governor David Walters in 1994.

In July 1998, Republican governor Frank Keating appointed Gurich as judge of the District Court for Oklahoma County, a position she was then reelected to in 2002, 2006, and 2010.

== Supreme Court ==
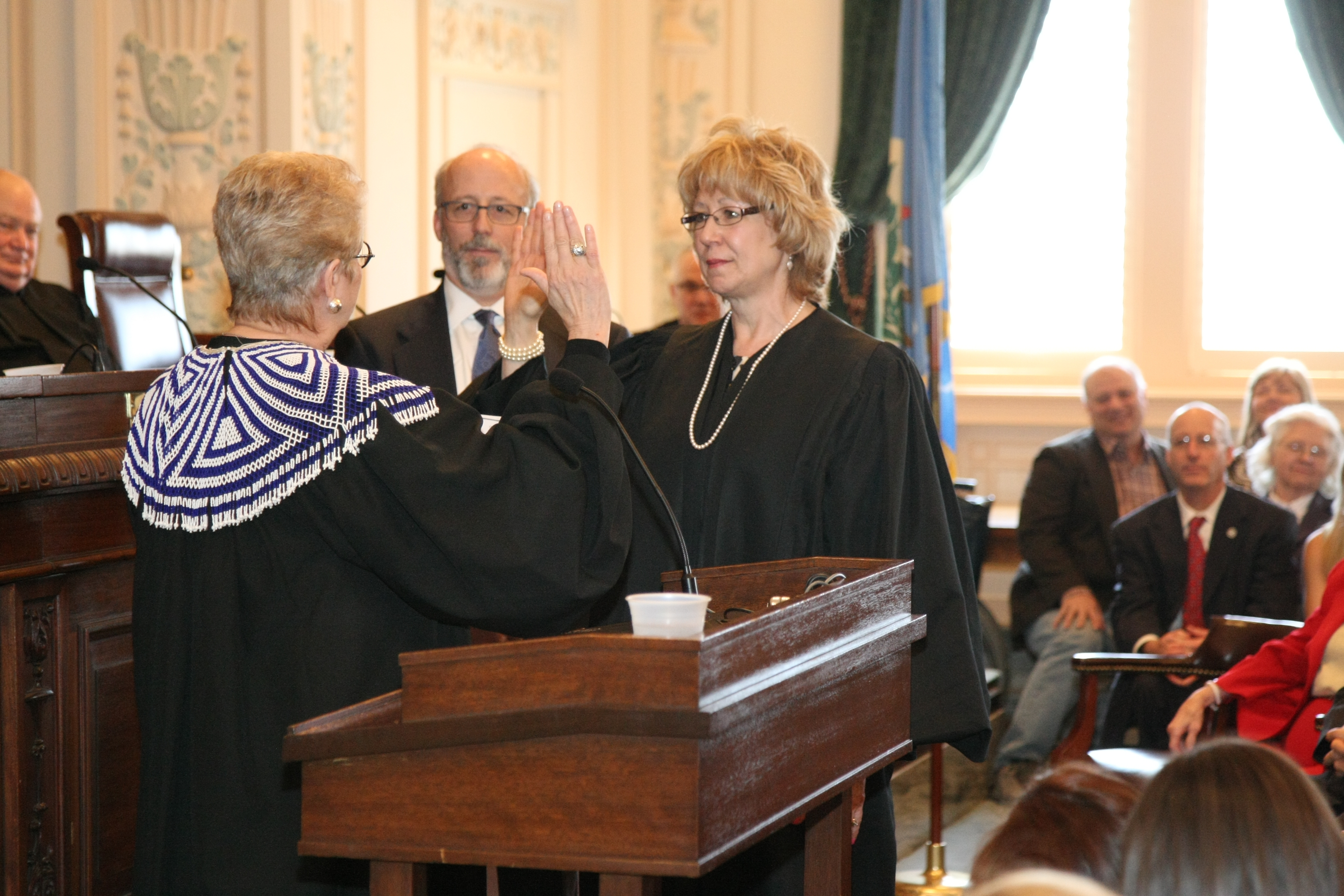
Gurich being sworn in as Associate Justice

In January 2011, following the death of long-time Justice Marian P. Opala, Democratic governor Brad Henry, on his last day in office, appointed Gurch to the Oklahoma Supreme Court. She served as Vice Chief Justice beginning on December 1, 2017. On November 18, 2018, she was elected chief justice by her peers. Her term as chief justice beginning January 1, 2019 and ended on December 31, 2020. Justice Gurich was retained in office in 2012, 2018 and 2024.

== Electoral history ==
Retain Noma Gurich, 2024
Choice	Votes	%
For	725,064	50.27
Against	717,360	49.73
Total	1,442,424	100.00

Legal offices
Preceded by Marian P. Opala	Justice of the Oklahoma Supreme Court; 2011–present	Incumbent
Preceded by Doug Combs	Chief Justice of the Oklahoma Supreme Court; 2019–2020	Succeeded by Richard Darby
