= Rennard Strickland =

Rennard James Strickland was a Philip H. Knight Professor of Law and former dean at the University of Oregon School of Law and senior scholar in residence at the University of Oklahoma College of Law.

Strickland earned his B.A. at Northeastern State University before getting his J.D. from the University of Virginia, M.A. from the University of Arkansas, and S.J.D. from the University of Virginia. After graduation, Strickland joined the faculty of the University of Arkansas School of Law and following it taught law at St. Mary's University, the University of Tulsa, the University of West Florida, the University of Washington, and at the University of Wisconsin. In 1985 he became dean at the Southern Illinois University School of Law and from 1990 to 1995 served as director of the Center for the Study of American Indian Law and Policy, before becoming professor at the University of Oklahoma College of Law. This was followed by a dean position at the same university and from 1997 to 2002, he also served as dean of Oklahoma City University from 1995 to 1997 and the University of Oregon School of Law.

Strickland was elected president of the Association of American Law Schools, served with the Society of American Law Teachers, and was a member of the American Bar Association.

Strickland was also a collector of Western movie posters and Native American art. In the late 2010s, Strickland donated a portion of his movie posters to the Scottsdale Museum of the West.

Rennard Strickland died on January 5, 2021, at the age of 80 in Norman, Oklahoma.
