= Marian P. Opala =

American judge (1921–2010)

Marian Peter Opala

Justice of the Oklahoma Supreme Court, 3rd District
- In office 1978–2010
- Appointed by: David Boren
- Succeeded by: Noma Gurich

Chief Justice of the Oklahoma Supreme Court
- In office 1991–1992

Personal details
- Born: January 20, 1921 Łódź, Poland
- Died: October 11, 2010 (aged 89) Oklahoma City, Oklahoma, United States
- Children: Joseph Opala
- Education: New York University Law School

Marian Peter Opala (January 20, 1921 – October 11, 2010) was a Polish-American lawyer and jurist who served as a justice of the Oklahoma Supreme Court from 1978 to 2010. Opala was appointed to the state's highest court in 1978 by Governor David Boren. Prior to his appointment as a Supreme Court Justice, Opala served the State of Oklahoma in various positions, including Assistant County Attorney for Oklahoma County, Administrative Director of the Oklahoma State Court System, and as a judge on the Oklahoma Workers' Compensation Court.

== Early life and World War II service ==
Opala was born in Łódź, Poland, the son of a prominent banker. After the German invasion of Poland in 1939, Opala, then a university student, enlisted in the Polish Army, and following Poland's defeat by Nazi Germany, joined the Polish Underground. In 1941 he escaped Poland via Turkey on the orders of his superiors in order to meet with Polish troops enlisted in the British Army in Palestine and Ethiopia to assure them that the struggle against the Nazi occupation was being waged vigorously at home with strong Allied support. After completing his mission, he served briefly with Polish troops in Italy and then parachuted back into Poland to resume his duties with the Polish Underground.

== Capture and subsequent liberation ==
In 1944, Opala was captured by German forces in the Warsaw Uprising and held in Flossenbürg concentration camp in Bavaria. After his liberation by the U.S. Army in 1945, he was befriended by Gene Warr, a captain in the 45th Infantry Division from Oklahoma City. Opala confided in Warr that he could not return to Poland after the Communist takeover and would probably settle somewhere in the British Commonwealth.

== U.S. immigration and education ==
Captain Warr helped Opala get a job as a translator for U.S. forces in Occupied Germany, and offered to help him immigrate to the United States. With Warr's assistance, Opala settled in Oklahoma City in 1947; he became a United States citizen six years later. He graduated from Oklahoma City University (OCU) with a bachelor's degree in economics in 1953 and a bachelor's degree in law in 1957. In 1968, he obtained a master's degree in law from New York University Law School. In 1981, OCU awarded him an honorary Doctor of Laws Degree.

== Early legal career ==
Opala served as Administrative Director of the Oklahoma State Court System from 1968 to 1977. He became a judge on what is now the Oklahoma Worker's Compensation Court in 1977 before being appointed to the state Supreme Court the following year.

== Oklahoma Supreme Court service ==
Opala was appointed to the Oklahoma Supreme Court's District 3 seat by Governor David Boren in 1978, and was retained by the voters in 1980, 1982, 1988, 1994, 2000 and 2006. He served as the Court's Chief Justice from 1991 to 1992 and again from 2000 to 2002. In 2000, Opala was inducted into the Oklahoma Hall of Fame. Throughout his career he was known as a strong advocate of First Amendment to the United States Constitution rights, a commitment he attributes to his experiences as a youth in Nazi-occupied Poland. A group called Freedom of Information Oklahoma presents the Marian Opala First Amendment Award every year to an Oklahoman who has "promoted education about or protection of the individual rights guaranteed under the First Amendment". In January 2005, Opala, then 83 years old and next in line once again to become Chief Justice, filed a federal lawsuit against his colleagues, alleging that they changed Oklahoma Supreme Court rules for succession to chief justice thereby arbitrarily allowing Chief Justice Joseph M. Watt to serve unprecedented consecutive terms. In July 2006, a federal appeals court dismissed Opala's lawsuit "with prejudice".

In addition to his career on the bench, Opala was an adjunct professor of law at Oklahoma City University, University of Oklahoma and the University of Tulsa, specializing in British and American legal history and constitutional law.

== Death ==
Justice Opala died on October 11, 2010, at Integris Baptist Hospital in Oklahoma City. He was found unconscious two days earlier, on October 9, at his home in Warr Acres. He had suffered a significant stroke.

Funeral services were held at All Souls' Episcopal Church in Oklahoma City on October 18, 2010.

According to his obituary, Justice Opala was survived by his longtime companion, Roberta A. Bertoch and one son, Joseph Opala, a historian who was then directing a research project in the West African nation of Sierra Leone.

== Additional sources ==
1. Bernard, Richard M. (1980) The Poles in Oklahoma, University of Oklahoma Press, Norman, OK.
2. "Judge, 83, alleges age discrimination" (www.courttv.com)
3. Smith, Janice-Francis (January 24, 2005). "Okla. Supreme Court Justice Marian Opala talks about his suit against .". The Journal Record.
