= Deborah Barnes =

American judge

Justice of the Oklahoma Court of Civil Appeals
- Incumbent
- Assumed office July 9, 2008
- Appointed by: Brad Henry

Personal details
- Spouse: Ron Barnes
- Education: Oklahoma City University School of Law (JD)
- Occupation: Justice - Oklahoma Court of Civil Appeals

Deborah Barnes (sometimes written as Deborah Browers Barnes) is a judge at the Oklahoma Court of Civil Appeals, the intermediate appellate court in the state of Oklahoma. She was appointed by Governor Brad Henry and her retention date was July 9, 2008. She has since won two retention votes in 2010 and 2014, and her next retention vote is scheduled for January 10, 2021.

== Legal career ==
Judge Barnes was a staff attorney for former state Supreme Court Justice Ralph Hodges from 1985 to 1989 and subsequently worked in civil litigation, administrative law, and commercial and business law.

During her first year on the court, she taught and mentored students in the oil and gas law course she taught for the University of Tulsa business school.

Judge Barnes was a vice president, corporate secretary and associate general counsel at Oneok Inc. in Tulsa from 1997 until 2001. Since 2002, she has worked in private practice at Crutchmer, Browers & Barnes.

Appointed to the Appeals Court by Governor Brad Henry, she was sworn into office on July 8, 2008. In the election of 2010, she faced a retention vote, which she won with a 62.0 percent favorable rating. In 2014, she received a 64.11 percent favorable vote.

== Education ==
She received her bachelor's degree from the University of Oklahoma and her Juris Doctor degree in 1983, from Oklahoma City University School of Law, where she graduated first in her class.

== Personal life ==
Judge Barnes is a breast cancer survivor. She was sworn into the court by her father-in-law, former state Supreme Court Justice Don Barnes. She is married to Ron Barnes, and they have a son named Grayson. Ron's grandfather, Maurice H. Merrill, was a law professor at the University of Oklahoma. Deborah and Ron lived at the Merrill house for the first three years of their married life. (Note: Deborah told an interviewer that, "... my job was to cook breakfast, and Dr. Merrill explained why it was important to teach beyond the classroom.”)

== Awards ==
Judge Barnes was awarded the James C. Lang Mentoring Award by the Tulsa County Bar Association.
