= Jerry Goodman (judge) =

American judge

Jerry L. Goodman
- Born: April 17, 1939 (age 87); Mangum, Oklahoma, U.S.
- Occupations: Attorney, judge
- Years active: 1964–2019
- Notable work: Oklahoma Court of Civil Appeals

Jerry L. Goodman (also known as Jerry Goodman) was born April 17, 1939, in Mangum, Oklahoma. He was a judge on the Oklahoma Court of Civil Appeals, an intermediate appellate court in the state of Oklahoma, for twenty-five years. Appointed to the court by Governor David Walters on July 26, 1994, Goodman was retained by voters in 1996, 2002, and 2008. On November 4, 2014, voters returned him for a full term ending January 10, 2021, with a favorable vote of 60.4 percent. Judge Goodman was elected chief judge of the court for a one-year term in 2016.

== Early life and career ==
Goodman was the son of a meat market owner in Mangum, Oklahoma. He earned his bachelor's degree from the University of Tulsa in 1961 and then earned a Juris Doctor degree from Georgetown University in 1964. Goodman worked as an assistant Tulsa city attorney for several years, served in the U.S. Department of Justice's Antitrust Division's trial section, and was a U.S. Senate staffer. Goodman also acted as a labor arbitrator for the National Railway Mediation Board. In 1968, Goodman ran against James Inhofe for a state senate seat and lost.

After practicing law for nearly twenty years, Goodman was named CEO of Otasco, where he also served as general counsel. Beginning in 1992, he spent two years in the administration of Oklahoma Governor David Walters, as chief operating officer and chairman of the Oklahoma Building Bonds Commission. In 1994, Walters appointed Goodman to the Oklahoma Court of Civil Appeals.

Goodman has served as the vice president of the Tulsa County Bar Association and on the Grand River Dam Authority. He has also served as chairman of Tulsa's Metropolitan Chamber of Commerce, Oklahoma's Consumer Credit Commission, of the trustees of the University Center at Tulsa, and of the Tulsa Utility Board.

== Career on the bench ==
In 1995, Goodman wrote the majority opinion for a trial in which a lower court assessed approved penalties of $200,000 against attorneys and their firms in a medical malpractice suit. The Court of Civil Appeals upheld a $100,000 assessment against one set of lawyers and dismissed a $100,000 assessment against a second set. (Note: The case initially involved 16 defendants, but the appellate court determined that there should have been only one defendant, and that many of the defendants had either been improperly named or were not notified by the defense attorneys as soon as the attorneys learned they should not have been charged. Even though that type of case is rare, Oklahoma law allows sanctions against the defense attorneys when it occurs.)

In 2016, Judge Goodman was selected to a one-year term as chief judge of the court, replacing Bill Hetherington of Oklahoma City, who had served as chief in 2015.

Goodman spoke to those present at the swearing-in ceremony about the political efforts to return to the direct election of judges - the system that existed before the reforms of the late 1960s. He said, that he would vigorously defend the state's current election system. “I am old enough to have practiced under the old system of elected judges — prior to 1969 — and since.”

Goodman retired from the Oklahoma Court of Civil Appeals effective July 31, 2019.

== Family ==
Goodman is married. He and his wife, Donna have four children.

== Memberships ==
- American Bar Association
- Oklahoma Bar Association
- Tulsa County Bar Associations
- American Judicature Society
- Oklahoma Judicial Conference

== See also ==
- Oklahoma Court of Civil Appeals
