= E. Bay Mitchell =

American judge

E. Bay Mitchell III

Judge of the Oklahoma Court of Civil Appeals, District 6, Office 1
- Incumbent
- Assumed office 1998
- Appointed by: Frank Keating
- Preceded by: James Garrett

Staff Attorney for Judge Carl Jones
- In office 1993–1998

Personal details
- Born: November 6, 1953 (age 72) Enid, Oklahoma
- Spouse(s): Debra Sue Mitchell, MD
- Education: University of Oklahoma College of Law
- Occupation: attorney, judge
- Profession: law

E. Bay Mitchell, III (born November 6, 1953) is a judge on the Oklahoma Court of Civil Appeals, the intermediate appellate court in the state of Oklahoma. He represents District 6, Office 1. Governor Frank Keating appointed him to this position in 2002. and he was retained by voters in 2004, in 2006, and 2012. He was up for another retention election in 2018, at the end of his 6-year term. Mitchell will again appear on the ballot for judge retention in the 2024 general election.

== Biography ==
Mitchell was born on November 6, 1953, and he grew up in Enid, Oklahoma. He received his bachelor's degree from the University of Oklahoma in 1976 and his J.D. degree from the University of Oklahoma College of Law in 1979. He and his wife Debra have three children.

== Legal career ==
After law school in 1979, Mitchell began his legal career as a private practice lawyer in Enid and Oklahoma City. In 1993, he became a staff attorney for Judge Carl Jones of the Oklahoma Court of Civil Appeals. He worked in this capacity until Governor Frank Keating appointed him to the Court of Appeals in 2002, filling the District 6 vacancy left by the retirement of Judge James Garrett. In 2009, Mitchell served for one year as Chief Judge.

== See also ==
- Oklahoma Court of Civil Appeals
