= Jane Wiseman (judge) =

American judge

Jane P. Wiseman
- Occupations: Attorney, judge
- Years active: 1973 - Present
- Notable work: Judge, Oklahoma Court of Civil Appeals

Jane P. Wiseman is an American judge. She currently sits on the Oklahoma Court of Civil Appeals, the intermediate appellate court of the state of Oklahoma.

Governor Brad Henry appointed her to this position in March 2005 and she was retained for District 1, Office 2 by voters statewide in the November 2006 election. She was again retained by voters in November 2008 and in November 2014, despite an aggressive campaign to unseat her. She was most recently retained again in November 2020. She has served twice as Chief Judge of the Court of Civil Appeals, the most recent being 2020 at the start of the pandemic.

== Education ==
Wiseman received her B.A. degree from Cornell University in 1969, her M.A. degree in American history from the University of North Carolina at Chapel Hill in 1971, and her J.D. degree from the University of Tulsa College of Law in 1973.

== Legal career ==
Wiseman began her legal career during law school as a clerk for the firm Rosenstein, Fist & Ringold, where she then became a legal intern, and then an associate until 1975. She then worked as a sole practitioner until January 1977, when she was appointed a special district judge for Tulsa County. She worked in this position until February 1981, when she was appointed a district judge. On this court, she worked in the Family Relations Division and then the Civil Division. She was the judge for nearly a thousand civil jury trials in the District Court.

She served on the District Court until she was appointed to the Court of Civil Appeals in Tulsa by Governor Brad Henry in March 2005.

Outside her normal duties, Wiseman has served as president of the Oklahoma Judicial Conference and served on its executive board and its education and diversity committees. As a member of the National Judicial College faculty in Reno, Nevada, she taught trial court case management. She has served the Oklahoma Bar Association on its Professionalism Committee, Evidence Committee, and the Special Task Force on Tort Reform. She is often a continuing legal education presenter for the OBA and the Tulsa County Bar Association, where she serves on its Awards and Nominations and Bench and Bar Committees.

== Personal life ==
Wiseman married Oklahoma legislator Bill Wiseman, but they later divorced after having two sons together. (Note: Bill Wiseman died in a plane crash in October, 2007) She married attorney Jim Hodges in 1994, retaining her professional name, and became stepmother to his two sons from a previous marriage. She has three granddaughters and a grandson.

Wiseman has a number of outside interests. In a 1991 interview, she said that she had taken a course in music at Tulsa Junior College, then leaned to play the recorder, a medieval woodwind instrument. She plays handbells and sings in the women's choir of the First Presbyterian Church of Tulsa and served on the Board of the local Gilbert & Sullivan Society. Wiseman currently serves as the chair of the advisory board for the University of Tulsa's Nimrod International Journal.
