= Barbara Swinton =

American judge (born 1960)

Justice of the Oklahoma Court of Civil Appeals
- Incumbent
- Assumed office September 14, 2016
- Appointed by: Mary Fallin
- Preceded by: William Hetherington

Judge of the Oklahoma County Court
- In office 1996–2016

Personal details
- Born: Barbara Cook Green; May 25, 1960 (age 66) Oklahoma City, Oklahoma, U.S.
- Party: Republican
- Spouse: Charles Swinton
- Education: Oklahoma State University (B.A., political science); Georgia State University College of Law (J.D.)
- Occupation: Attorney, judge

Barbara Cook Green Swinton (born May 25, 1960) is a judge on the Oklahoma Court of Civil Appeals. She was appointed to the appellate court by Governor Mary Fallin on September 14, 2016, to replace Judge Bill Hetherington, who retired from District Four, Office One on September 2, 2016. Prior to her appointment, Judge Swinton served as district court judge for the 7th Judicial District, beginning in 2002. (Note: On Tuesday, May 9, 2017, Governor Fallon nominated Oklahoma County Special Judge Richard Ogden as Swinton's replacement as district judge. Ogden had previously served for two years as the Oklahoma County Special Judge. He earned his J.D. at Oklahoma University.)

Swinton was appointed as a special judge for Oklahoma County in 1996. Before that, she worked for a year as a trial lawyer with David W. Lee and Associates, handling family law and federal civil rights cases.

Her first professional job was with Riggs, Abney, Neal, Turpen, Orbison and Lewis, where she spent four years practicing general civil and family law.

Judge Swinton earned her bachelor's degree in political science with honors from Oklahoma State University and her J.D. in 1991 from Georgia State University College of Law.

== Family ==
Swinton is married to Charles Swinton, senior vice president of public affairs and corporate trust at BancFirst. The couple has three adult children.
