= Keith Rapp =

American judge (1934–2022)

Justice of the Oklahoma Court of Civil Appeals
- In office 1984 – August 16, 2022
- Appointed by: George Nigh
- Succeeded by: TBD

Personal details
- Born: May 2, 1934 Wheelersburg, Ohio, U.S.
- Died: August 16, 2022 (aged 88) Tulsa, Oklahoma, U.S.
- Spouse: Mary Lynn Clanton
- Children: 3
- Education: University of Tulsa, (J.D.); University of Virginia, (L.L.M.)
- Occupation: Aerospace engineer; attorney; judge
- Profession: Law

W. Keith Rapp (May 2, 1934 – August 16, 2022) was an American attorney in Oklahoma who served as judge on the Oklahoma Court of Civil Appeals, the intermediate appellate court in the state of Oklahoma, from 1984 to 2022. A native of Ohio, he earned his Juris Doctor degree from the University of Tulsa School of Law.

== Biography ==
Judge Rapp was born on May 2, 1934, in Wheelersburg, Ohio. He received his undergraduate degree from Southwest Missouri State University (now Missouri State University) and took graduate classes in mathematics and statistics from the University of Missouri, University of Minnesota and University of Arizona. Rapp then worked as an aerospace engineer on many major NASA projects before receiving his J.D. degree from the University of Tulsa. Rapp later earned a Master of Laws degree from the University of Virginia.

== Military service and aerospace career ==
From 1953 to 1955, he served in the United States Navy, completing two tours of duty in the Far East as an aerial navigator and electronics warfare operator with the VC-35. Later, he retired from the U.S. Naval Reserves as a Judge Advocate General Corps commander.

Returning to civilian life, Rapp went to work as an aerospace engineer, specializing in inertial guidance and navigation systems. Some of his projects included Mercury, Gemini, Apollo, and SkyLab for the U.S. space program and Bomarc, the first operational surface-to-air missile for the Department of Defense. While working as an engineer, he enrolled in the University of Tulsa School of Law, where he earned his Juris Doctor (J.D.) degree. Later, he earned the LL.M. degree from the University of Virginia. (Note: According to the University of Virginia alumni publication, Rapp graduated in the class of 1990.)

== Legal career ==
After completing law school at the University of Tulsa, Judge Rapp served as a public defender and city prosecutor in Broken Arrow, Oklahoma. He later served as a municipal judge in Bixby, Oklahoma, and then an alternative municipal judge in Tulsa, Oklahoma. After this, he was judge on the 14th District Court in Tulsa. He stood for election against incumbent Judge Fred DeMier for the Oklahoma Court of Civil Appeals in 1984. It was the first time a challenger had unseated an incumbent since the Oklahoma Court of Civil Appeals was created in 1969. (Note: DeMeir and Rapp had met on a ballot once before, when running against each other in 1982 for a two-year term as Civil Appeals Court Judge. DeMeir had won that match.)

Voters chose to retain Rapp on the Appeals Court most recently in the 2014 election. His retention rating was 59.3 percent.

== Personal life and death ==
Rapp married the former Mary Lynn Clanton. They had three children, Elizabeth, Kathy and Joseph.

Keith Rapp died in Tulsa on August 16, 2022, at the age of 88.
