= Oklahoma Court of Civil Appeals =

Intermediate appellate court of Oklahoma

- Established: 1970
- Jurisdiction: Oklahoma
- Composition method: Intermediate appellate court
- Authorised by: State legislature
- Appeals from: Oklahoma Supreme Court
- Number of positions: 12
- Website: Oklahoma Court of Civil Appeals

The Oklahoma Court of Civil Appeals is an intermediate appellate court in the state of Oklahoma. Cases are assigned to it by the Oklahoma Supreme Court, the state's highest court for civil matters.

The court consists of twelve judges divided into four panels with three judges each. They are responsible for the majority of appellate decisions in Oklahoma. Furthermore, the Oklahoma Supreme Court has the power to release the court's opinions for publication, in which case they have value as precedent.

Two of the court's four panels are housed in Tulsa, Oklahoma. The two Oklahoma City panels are housed in the Oklahoma State Capitol building.

== History ==
The Oklahoma Court of Civil Appeals was established by the state legislature in 1970 under Title 20, section 30.1, of the Oklahoma Statutes, which provides: "There is hereby established an intermediate appellate court to be known as the Court of Civil Appeals of the State of Oklahoma which shall have the power to determine or otherwise dispose of any cases that are assigned to it by the Supreme Court." Any decision of the Court of Civil Appeals in any case assigned to it, upon petition by one of the parties involved, may be reviewed by the Oklahoma Supreme Court if a majority of its Justices direct that a petition for certiorari be granted, and the Supreme Court may, by order, recall a case from the Court of Civil Appeals.

== Selection process ==
Appellate judges are appointed by the governor from a list of three candidates nominated by the Oklahoma Judicial Nominating Commission. The commission is composed of six attorneys who are "members of the Oklahoma Bar Association and who have been elected by the other active members of their district," 6 non-attorneys appointed by the governor, and 3 non-attorney "members at large," one to be selected by the President Pro Tempore of the Senate, one to be selected by the Speaker of the House of Representatives, and one to be selected by at least eight members of the commission itself. Article 7B, section 3, of the Oklahoma Constitution sets forth the composition of the nominating commission in even greater detail.

== Members ==
=== Current judges ===
The judges of the Court of Civil Appeals are:

Name	District	Seat	Duty Station	Start	Appointer	Law School	Succeeded
Bay Mitchell	6	1	Oklahoma City	2002	Frank Keating (R)	Oklahoma	James Garrett
Robert Bell	5	2	Oklahoma City	2005	Brad Henry (D)	Tulsa	Carl Jones
Jane Wiseman	1	2	Tulsa	March 2005	Brad Henry (D)	Tulsa	Joe Taylor
John Fischer	3	2	Tulsa	May 2006	Brad Henry (D)	Oklahoma	New seat
Deborah Barnes	2	1	Tulsa	2008	Brad Henry (D)	Oklahoma City	New seat
Brian Goree	6	2	Oklahoma City	August 2012	Mary Fallin (R)	Tulsa	Carol Hansen
Barbara Swinton	4	1	Oklahoma City	September 14, 2016	Mary Fallin (R)	Georgia State	William Hetherington
Stacie Hixon	1	1	Tulsa	March 11, 2020	Kevin Stitt (R)	Tulsa	Jerry Goodman
Thomas Prince	5	1	Oklahoma City	January 1, 2021	Kevin Stitt (R)	Oklahoma City	Kenneth Buettner
Gregory Blackwell	3	1	Tulsa	June 21, 2021	Kevin Stitt (R)	Oklahoma	Tom Thornbrugh
Timothy Downing	4	2	Oklahoma City	May 27, 2022	Kevin Stitt (R)	Regent	Trevor Pemberton
Jim Huber	2	2	Tulsa	April 6, 2023	Kevin Stitt (R)	Tulsa	Keith Rapp

This graphical timeline depicts the length of each current judge's tenure on the Court:

=== Timeline of judges ===
Beginning in 1987, seats on the Court of Civil Appeals are filled by non-partisan appointment by the Governor of Oklahoma upon nomination by the Oklahoma Judicial Nominating Commission. Judges serve until the next general election following their appointment at which they are retained or rejected. If retained, they serve for an additional six-years until the next retention election.

Note: The blue vertical line denotes "now" (May 2026).
Bar key: Democratic appointee Republican appointee
