= Ernest Hartsock =

American poet (1903–1930)

- Born: Ernest Abner Hartsock; May 5, 1903; Atlanta, Georgia, U.S.
- Died: December 14, 1930 (aged 27); Atlanta, Georgia, U.S.
- Resting place: Westview Cemetery
- Education: Emory University (BA, MA)
- Occupation: Poet
- Writing career
- Years active: 1912-1930
- Period: Interwar

Ernest Abner Hartsock (May 5, 1903 – December 14, 1930) was an American poet, publisher, editor, and academic who gained national notoriety during the interwar period.

== Early years and education ==
Hartsock was born on May 5, 1903, in Atlanta, Georgia. He was educated at Boys High School (now known as Midtown High School) in Atlanta and earned BA and MA degrees from Emory University, where he was a member of Kappa Sigma fraternity. After graduation, he became an instructor at Georgia School of Technology in 1927 before becoming professor of poetics at Oglethorpe in 1929, where he taught until his death.

== Arts and poetry ==
Hartsock's volumes of poetry were: Romance and Stardust (1925); Narcissus and Iscariot (1927); and Strange Splendor (1930). In 1929 he was awarded the annual award of excellence by the Poetry Society of America for "Strange Splendor," the first Atlantan to ever be so recognized. Hartsock was also founder, owner, and editor of the Bozart Press, a press devoted to the publication of poetry. An accomplished musician, Hartsock served as organist for the Palace Theater in Atlanta for four years.

== Death and legacy ==
Hartsock died on December 14, 1930, at the age of 27.

A life-size bronze bust of Hartsock by sculptor Fritz Zimmer currently resides in the Philip Weltner Library at Oglethorpe University. Another smaller, plaster bust of Hartsock made by Atlanta poet Blossom Tucker is held in the Oglethorpe University Archives.

== Memorial poems ==
- Johnson, Geoffrey. "Elegy: For Ernest Hartsock." Bozart and Contemporary Verse, vol. 4, no. 5, May-Jun. 1930, p. 11.
- Kean, L. Logan. "To Ernest Hartsock." Bozart and Contemporary Verse, vol. 4, no. 4, Mar.-Apr. 1930, p. [21].
- Litsey, Sarah. "For Ernest Hartsock: A Tribute." Bozart and Contemporary Verse, vol. 4, no. 4, Mar.-Apr. 1930, p. 3.
- McAfee, Laura Spilman. "Whom Sayest Thou: For Ernest Hartsock." Bozart and Contemporary Verse, vol. 4, no. 5, May-Jun. 1930, pp. 12-13.
- Michael, Moina. "To Ernest Hartsock: A Tribute." Bozart and Contemporary Verse, vol. 4, no. 4, Mar.-Apr. 1930, p. 3.
- Mirick, Edith. "'Scorcher of the Ground...': For Ernest Hartsock." Bozart and Contemporary Verse, vol. 4, no. 6, Jul.-Aug. 1930, p. 13.
- "A Poet Passes--But a 'Strange Splendor' Remains." Bozart and Contemporary Verse, vol. 4, no. 4, Mar.-Apr. 1930, pp. [front, inside cover-back, inside cover].

== Selected publications ==
=== Books ===
- Narcissus and Iscariot. Atlanta, Ga.: Bozart Press, 1927.
- Romance and Stardust. Saugus, Mass.: CAA Parker, 1925.
- Strange Splendor. Atlanta, Ga.: Bozart Press, 1930.

=== Articles, essays, and book reviews ===
- "Again Hero." Bozart and Contemporary Verse, vol. 3, no. 5, May-Jun. 1930, p. 2.
- "Blindfold Tests for Critics: Four Out of Five Have It." Bozart and Contemporary Verse, vol. 3, no. 6, Jul.-Aug. 1930, pp. 2-3.
- “Ernest Talks.” Emory Phoenix, vol. 41, no. 1, Oct.-Nov. 1925, pp. 11-13.
- “Ernest Talks.” Emory Phoenix, vol. 41, no. 2, Dec. 1925, pp. 11-13.
- “Ernest Talks.” Emory Phoenix, vol. 41, no. 3, Jan.-Feb. 1926, pp. 12-16.
- “Ernest Talks.” Emory Phoenix, vol. 41, no. 5, Apr. 1926, pp. 14-16.
- “Exchange Department.” Emory Phoenix, vol. 39, no. 6, Apr. 1924, pp. 252-254.
- “Frank and Ernest Editorials.” Emory Phoenix, vol. 40, no. 3, Dec. 1924, pp. 78-79.
- “The Future of Poetry.” In How to Profit from that Impulse: A Symposium on Contemporary Poetic Practice and the Creative Process, edited by Lucia Trent, Ralph Cheyney, Benjamin Musser, New York, N.Y.: Dean & Company, 1928, p. 25.
- "Humanism New or Old?" Bozart and Contemporary Verse, vol. 3, no. 4, Mar.-Apr. 1930, pp. 2-3.
- “In Defense of Punning”. American Speech, vol. 4, no. 3, Feb. 1929, pp. 224-227.
- “Interesting Contemporary Poets.” Emory Phoenix, vol. 38, no. 5, Mar 1923, pp. 199-201.
- "Pasture on Parnassus". Bozart, vol. 1, no. 1, Sep.-Oct. 1927, pp. 14-16. (Note: Includes reviews of Copper Sun by Countee Cullen; The Woman at Point Star by Robinson Jeffers; The Traveller by Iris Tree; Lost Eden by Merrill Root; Hero and Leander by Brooks More; Sonnets by Amory Hare; Dawn Stars by Lucia Trent; Touch and Go by Ralph Cheyney; and The Lone Adventurer by Stanton A. Coblentz.)
- "Pasture on Parnassus". Bozart, vol. 1, no. 2, Nov.-Dec. 1927, pp. 16-19. (Note: Includes reviews of The Road to Xanadu by John Livingston Lowes; The Tall Men by Donald Davidson; The Bright Doom by John Hall Wheelock; A Stranger in Heaven by Harold Vinal; Untamed by Benjamin Musser; Penny Show by Mary Carolyn Davies; The Song of Songs by S. Fowler Wright; Leaven for Loaves by Frederick Herbert Adler; Behind the Mask by Rosa Zagnoni Marinoni, A Group of Books by Minor Poets; Beads and Charms by May Folwell Hoisington; and Hedges, Hills, and Horizons by Carl John Bostelman.)
- "Pasture on Parnassus." Bozart, vol. 1, no. 3, Jan.-Feb. 1928, pp. 16-19. (Note: Includes reviews of Tristan and Isolt by John Masefield; The Evergreen Tree by Kathleen Millay; Wildwood Fables by Arthur Guiterman; The Night Express by Arthur Crew Inman; Translations from Jose-Maria de Heredia by Merle St. Croix Wright; Stygian Freight by Cale Young Rice; The Winged Horse by Joseph Auslander and Frank Ernest Hill; Flame Wings by Evelyn M. Watson; High in Her Tower by Charles Phillips; A Horn from Caerleon by J. Corson Miller; Winds of Dawn by John Ransom Palmer; Dear Earth by Jochim Aviron; and Outside Eden by Gertrude Nason Carver.)
- "Pasture on Parnassus." Bozart, vol. 1, no. 4, Mar.-Apr. 1928, pp. 17-19. (Note: Includes reviews of Collected Poems of Edwin Arlington Robinson by Edwin Arlington Robinson; Pioneer Work in Modern Art; Boy in the Wind by George Dillon; Anthology of Magazine Verse for 1927 by W. S. Braithwaite; America Arraigned edited by Lucia Trent and Ralph Cheyney; Candlers on the Sill by Elkanah East Taylor; A White Sail Set by Virginia Lyne Tunstall; Shades of Blue by Isadora Newman; Songs and Sonnets of the Sea by Belle Willey Gue; More Minor Poets; Palace of Silver by Kate Slaughter McKinney; and Contemporary Poets: An Anthology edited by Gordon Dorrance.)
- "Pasture on Parnassus." Bozart, vol. 1, no. 5, May-Jun. 1928, pp. 17-19. (Note: Includes reviews of The Sea and April by John R. Moreland; The Oracle Anthology; Sea-Drinking Cities by Josephine Pinckney; Bright World by George Elliston; Contemporary Kansas Poetry edited by Helen Rhoda Hoopes; Pretty Books; From Overseas: An Anthology; The Best Poems of 1927 edited by L. A. G. Strong; Burnt Clay by P. Brooks Houston; and Contemporary Poets.)
- "Pasture on Parnassus." Bozart, vol. 1, no. 6, Jul.-Aug. 1928, pp. 17-19. (Note: Includes reviews of The King of Spain and Other Poems by Maxwell Bodenheim; Jealous of Dead Leaves by Shaemas O'Sheel; Burning Bush by Louis Untermeyer; The Temptation of Anthony by Isidor Schneider; Hale's Pond by James Whaler; Songs of Nothing Certain: Univ. of Ga. Verse, 1920-28; Fire and Sleet and Candlelight by Eleanor Carroll Chilton, Herbert Agar, and Willis Fisher; Little Henrietta by Lizette Woodworth Reese; and Vinal Books.)
- "Pasture on Parnassus." Bozart, vol. 2, no. 1, Sep.-Oct. 1928, pp. 17-19. (Note: Includes reviews of The Lyric South compiled by Addison Hibbard; Poems in Praise of Practically Nothing by Samuel Hoffenstein; Winds from the Moon by Sonia Ruthele Novak; Nocturnes and Autumnals by David Morton; Gongorism and the Golden Age by Elisha K. Kane; Fugitives: An Anthology of Verse; Recent Vinal Publications; House of Happiness by B. Y. Williams; New Dorrance Volumes; and An Etching by Mary S. Fitzgerald.)
- "Pasture on Parnassus." Bozart, vol. 2, no. 2, Nov.-Dec. 1928, pp. 17-19. (Note: Includes reviews of The Back in the Snow by Edna St. Vincent Millay; The Grub Street Book of Verse, 1928 edited by Henry Harrison; Silver in the Sun by Grace Noll Crowell; Venus Invisible by Nathalia Crane; The Traveler's Book of Verse collected by Frederick E. Emmons and T. W. Huntington, Jr.; The Romanesque Lyric by Philip Schuyler Allen and Howard Mumford Jones; Wild out of Betelgeuse by Margaret Tod Ritter; The Lost Lyrist by Elizabeth Hollister Frost; Sonnets to Craig by George Sterling; Sky-Rider by Wade Oliver; Lectures on Egyptian Art by Jean Capart; Two Dean Books; and The Chaff of Life by George Otis Schoonhoven.)
- "Pasture on Parnassus." Bozart, vol. 2, no. 3, Jan.-Feb. 1929, pp. 17-20. (Note: Includes reviews of West-running Brook by Robert Frost; Now the Sky and Other Poems by Mark Van Doren; Collected Sonnets of Edwin Arlington Robinson; Braithwaite's Anthology, 1928 complied by W. S. Braithwaite; The Death of a Buccaneer and Other Poems by Stanley E. Babb; The Best Poems of 1928 selected by Thomas Moult; Winter Words in Various Moods and Meters by Thomas Hardy; Spires and Spears by Walter F. Hendricks; Collected Poems of Margaret Widdemer; A Few Vinal Books; and Selected Poems for Armistice Day edited by C.B. McAllister)
- "Pasture on Parnassus." Bozart, vol. 2, no. 4, Mar.-Apr. 1929, pp. 16-20. (Note: Includes reviews of An Anthology of World Poetry edited by Mark Van Doran; A Son of Earth by William Ellery Leonard; Earthbound and Other Poems by Helene Mullins; The Great Enlightenment by Lee Wilson Dodd; Selected Poems, 1928 by Robert Frost; Star-dust and Stone by Glen Ward Dresbach; The Quest by John G. Neihardt; Many Devices by Roselle Mercier Montgomery; Pagan Fires Challis Silvay; April Comes Early by Carl John Bostelmann; Fifty Poems by American Poets edited by Joseph Dean; The Oracle Anthology of Poetry, 1928 edited by May Folwell Hoisington; Island of the Blest by Thornwell Jacobs; The Peddler of Dreams and Other Poems by Elizabeth Davis Richards; Some Very Minor Poets; and How to Profit from that Impulse complied by Lucia Trent, Ralph Cheyney, and Benjamin Musser.)
- "Pasture on Parnassus." Bozart, vol. 2, no. 5, May-Jun. 1929, pp. 16-20. (Note: Includes reviews of Cavender's House by Edwin Arlington Robinson; Angels and Earthly Creatures by Elinor Wylie; The Hamlet of A. MacLeish; The Long Leash by Jessica Nelson North; Children of Fire and Shadow by Lucia Trent; Ballyhoo for a Mendicant by Carlton Talbott; A Stranger and Afrait by Ted Olson; Women's Poetry Today: An Anthology selected by Lewis Worthington Smith; The Craft of Poetry by Clement Wood; Machinery by MacKnight Black; Who's Who Among North American Authors; Some Poetry Brochures.)
- "Pasture on Parnassus." Bozart, vol. 2, no. 6, Jul.-Aug. 1929, pp. 17-19. (Note: Includes reviews of Golden Falcon by Robert P. Tristram Coffin; Anthology of Revolutionary Poetry edited by Marcus Graham; Pheidias by John Galen Howard; 5 Poets: Isobel Stone, Edith Mirick, Jewell Miller, Norman Macleod, Benjamin Musser; A Second Book of Poems Involving Love by S. H. Samuels; Red Heels by Lexie Dean Robertson; Cinderella Cargoes by George Elliston; Aromancy by Faith Van alkenburgh Vilas; This Man's Army by John Allen Wyeth; Bowls of Phantasy by Flora Bishop Hendricks; Vinal Verse.)
- "Pasture on Parnassus." Bozart, vol. 3, no. 1, Sep.-Oct. 1929, pp. 17-19. (Note: Includes reviews of Domesday Book by Edgar Lee Masters; Sonnets from a Lock Box by Anna Hempstead; Mad Queen: Tirades by Harry Crosby; O City, Cities by R. Ellsworth Larsson; Time's Profile by Hildegarde Flanner; Driven by LeRoy MacLeod; The Hermit Thrush by Kathleen Millay; Dream-Again by Isabel Fiske Conant; Red Kites and Wooden Crosses by Rosa Zagnoni Marinoni; The Light of Day edited by Henry Harrison; Victory and Other Poems by James Gabelle; Lilacs by Mary Dell Allen; Two "Studies" Books.)
- "Pasture on Parnassus." Bozart, vol. 3, no. 2, Nov.-Dec. 1929, pp. 16-19. (Note: Includes reviews of Every Soul Is a Circus by Vachel Lindsay; Pep by Lion Feuchtwanger; The Literature of America edited by Quinn, Baugh, and Howe; The Noise that Time Makes by Merrill Moore; Stone Dust by Frank Ernest Hill; Song and Laughter by Arthur Guiterman; God-Beguiled by George O'Neil; Parnassus en Route complied by Kenneth Horan; Certain Poets of Importance complied by Hattie Hecht Sloss; Twentieth Century Love Poems complied by Caroline Miles Hill; The Grub Street Book of Verse, 1929 edited by Henry Harrison; Myself Limited by Henry Harrison.)
- "Pasture on Parnassus." Bozart and Contemporary Verse, vol. 3, no. 3, Jan.-Feb. 1930, pp. 14-17. (Note: Includes reviews of Hunters of Heaven by Clement Wood; Poetry and Hathematics by Scott Buchanan; The Book of Sonnet Sequences edited by Houston Peterson; Bow of Burning Gold by E. Merrill Root; New Legends by Hevery Allen; The Black Christ and Other Poems by Countee Cullen; The Collected Poems of Gerald Gould; The Fate of the Jury by Edgar Lee Masters; Tristan in Brittany translated by Dorothy Leigh Sayers; The King with Three Faces by Marjorie Allen Seiffert.)
- "Pasture on Parnassus." Bozart and Contemporary Verse, vol. 3, no. 4, Mar.-Apr. 1930, pp. 14-16. (Note: Includes reviews of Selected Poems by William Alexander Percy; Anthology of Georgia Verse; Letters to Women by Joseph Auslander; The Poet in the Desert by Chas. Erskine Scott Wood; The Wind in the Cedars by Glenn Ward Dresbach; Huckleberries by Antoinette Scudder; Selected Poems by Conrad Aiken; Half-Light and Overtones by Henri Faust.)
- "Pasture on Parnassus." Bozart and Contemporary Verse, vol. 3, no. 5, May-Jun. 1930, pp. 16-20. (Note: Includes reviews of Droll Parade by Carlton Talbott; The Cycle of Modern Poetry by G. R. Elliott; The Secret Bird by Jessie B. Rittenhouse; The Roosevelt and the Antinoe by E. J. Pratt; The Red Harvest edited by Vincent G. Burns; The Golden Stallion edited by D. Maitland Bushby; The American Scrapbook, 1930 edited by Wm. Griffith; Five Harrison Books; Pan and the Fire-Bird by Sam M. Steward; Brown Fields and Bright Lights by Whitney Montgomery; Sheep's Clothing by Margaret E. Haughawout.)
- "Pasture on Parnassus." Bozart and Contemporary Verse, vol. 3, no. 6, Jul.-Aug. 1930, pp. 17-20. (Note: Includes reviews of The Bridge by Hart Crane; The Bird-Lovers' Anthology edited by Clinton Scollard and Jessie Rittenhouse; Released by Anne Blackwell Payne; Virtuosa by Louise Owen; After-Walker: The Poems of Leonard Cline; Newry by John R. Moreland; Deep South by Carl Carmer; A Magic World compiled by Margery Gordon and Marie B. King; Copy, 1930 introduction by Glen H. Mullin; Copra and Pearl by Frederick James Hill; Pittsburg College Verse, 1924-30edited by Margaret E. Haughawout; The Rollins Book of Verse edited by Jessie Rittenhouse.)
- "Pasture on Parnassus." Bozart and Contemporary Verse, vol. 4, no. 1, Sep.-Oct. 1920pp. 15-16. (Note: Includes reviews of White April by Lizette Woodworth Reese; A Breadline for Souls by Gloria Goddard; They Rise Academy by Clyde Robertson; Two Dorrance Books; Black Poppies by Jan Isbelle Fortune.)
- "Pasture on Parnassus." Bozart and Contemporary Verse, vol. 4, no. 2, Nov.-Dec. 1930, pp. 15-17. (Note: Includes reviews of The Glory of the Nightingales by Edwin Arlington Robinson; The Gates of the Compass by Robert Hillyer; The Best Poems of 1930 selected by Thomas Moult; Beyond edited by Sherman Ripley; Wishing on a Comet by Louise Burton Laidlaw; Pocahontas by Nathalia Crane; Outside of the World by Katherine Garrison Chapin; Deeper Silence by Samuel Heller; This Experimental Life by Royall Snow.)
- "Review of Diana Dauntless by Paul Kester." Atlanta Journal Magazine, vol. 48, no. 123, 28 Jul. 1929, p. 22.
- "Review of The Song of Songs by Fowler Wright and The Hermit Thrush by Kathleen Millay." Atlanta Journal Magazine, vol. 47, no. 139, 14 Jul. 1929, p. 22.
- “Review of Touch and Go by Lucia Trent and Ralph Cheyney.” Emory Phoenix, vol. 41, no. 2, Dec. 1926, pp. 33-34.
- “Roses in the Desert: A View of Contemporary Southern Verse.” Sewanee Review, vol. 37, no. 3, Jul. 1929, pp. 328-338.
- "Two Epic Crucifixions." Bozart and Contemporary Verse, vol. 3, no. 3, pp. 2-3. (Note: Includes reviews of Dear Judas by Robinson Jeffers and Firehead by Lola Ridge.)

=== Poems ===
- “Advent.” Opportunity: A Journal of Negro Life, vol. 6, no, 2, Feb. 1928, p. 50.
- “Adventure with Violets.” Poetry, vol. 6, no, 3, Jul. 1930, pp. 369-370.
- “Amaryllis.” Emory Phoenix, vol. 41, no. 1, Oct.-Nov. 1925, p. 28.
- “April Mile.” Poetry, vol. 34, no. 1, Apr. 1929, pp. 21-22.
- "Argosies." Bozart, vol. 2, no. 5, May-Jun. 1929, p. 4.
- "Battle Song." Bozart, vol. 2, no. 6, Jul.-Aug. 1929, p. 16.
- "Blind Man's Bluff." Bozart, vol. 3, no. 1, Sep.-Oct. 1929, p. 4.
- "Brief Abandon." Bozart and Contemporary Verse, vol. 3, no. 4, Mar.-Apr. 1930, p. 10.
- “Cadences & Rhymes.” Emory Phoenix, vol. 38, no. 1, Oct. 1922, pp. 17-18.
- "Catalog." Bozart, vol. 1, no. 3, Jan.-Feb. 1928, p. 8.
- “The Call Beyond.” Emory Phoenix, vol. 38, no. 1, Oct. 1922, p. 6.
- "The Call for Peace." Bozart and Contemporary Verse, vol. 4, no. [4], p. 2.
- “Chanson d'Ennui--(To J. H.).” Emory Phoenix, vol. 39, no. 6, Apr. 1924, p. 242.
- “Certainty.” Emory Phoenix, vol. 41, no. 2, Dec. 1925, p. 29.
- “Doom-bound.” Emory Phoenix, vol. 39, no. 1, Oct. 1923, pp. 12-15.
- “Dream by Moonlight.” Emory Phoenix, vol. 41, no. 2, Dec. 1925, p. 24.
- "Druid's Advice." Atlanta Journal Magazine, vol. 47, no. 139, 14 Jul. 1929, p. 22.
- "English Prof." Bozart, vol. 2, no. 1, Sep.-Oct. 1928, p. 4.
- “Epitaph for Chaucer's Prioress.” Emory Phoenix, vol. 41, no. 6, May 1926, p. 17.
- “Epitaph for Falstaff.” Emory Phoenix, vol. 41, no. 6, May 1926, p. 28.
- "Epitaph for a Hard-Boiled Virgin." Bozart, vol. 1, no. 5, May-Jun. 1928, p. 20.
- “Epitaph for Job.” Emory Phoenix, vol. 41, no. 3, Jan.-Feb. 1926, p. 27.
- “Epitaph for Nero.” Emory Phoenix, vol. 41, no. 5, Apr. 1926, p. 6.
- "Fever--Called Living." Bozart, vol. 2, no. 6, Jul.-Aug. 1929, p. 7.
- “Florida Sketches.” Emory Phoenix, vol. 41, no. 1, Oct.-Nov. 1925, p. 4.
- "Football Coach." Bozart and Contemporary Verse, vol. 3, no. 3, p. 12.
- "For the Not Unknown Soldier (Armistice Day, 1929)." Bozart, vol. 3, no. 2, Nov.-Dec. 1929, pp. 10-11.
- “Foolish Virgins." Opportunity: A Journal of Negro Life, vol. 6, no. 12, Dec. 1928, p. 361.
- “For a Dead Love.” Emory Phoenix, vol. 41, no. 2, Dec. 1925, p. 10. [Poem signed E. H.]
- "For a Mariner." Atlanta Journal Magazine, vol. 47, no. 14, 10 Mar. 1929, p. 22.
- "Four Poems for a New Philosophy: O Tempora!, Stirrup Cup, Lacrimae Rerum, and Overtones." Bozart and Contemporary Verse, vol. 4, no. 1, pp. 2-4.
- “Gist of Glory.” Poetry, vol. 35, no. 4, Jan. 1930, p. 194.
- "Gideon before Troy." Bozart, vol. 2, no. 2, Nov.-Dec. 1928, p. 5.
- “God, the Soviet.” Emory Phoenix, vol. 41, no. 5, Apr. 1926, p. 13.
- "Gold Interlude." Bozart, vol. 2, no. 2, Nov.-Dec. 1928, p. 9.
- "Gotterdammerung. Bozart, vol. 2, no. 4, Mar.-Apr. 1929, p. 4.
- “The Harbor Lighter.” Emory Phoenix, vol. 40, no. 3, Dec. 1924, p. 108.
- “The Heard Silence.” Emory Phoenix, vol. 41, no. 6, May 1926, p. 13.
- "Heart's Winter." Bozart and Contemporary Verse, vol. 3, no. 3, p. 9.
- “Isabel Whitsted.” Emory Phoenix, vol. 40, no. 3, Dec. 1924, pp. 89-91.
- “Literary Epitaphs [For Mr. Babbitt; For (Mr. Erskine's) Galahad; For Elmer Gantry, Jr.].” Nation, vol. 127, no. 3300, 3 Oct. 1928, p. 321.
- “Madonna in Flanders.” In An Anthology of Revolutionary Poetry. edited by Marcus Graham, New York, N.Y.: Active Press, Inc., 1929.
- “Martyrdom.” Emory Phoenix, vol. 39, no. 1, Oct. 1923, p. 17.
- "May Mystery." Bozart, vol. 2, no. 5, May-Jun. 1929, p. 9.
- "Missionary and Mandarin." Bozart, vol. 1, no. 4, Mar.-Apr. 1928, p. 12.
- “Mysterium.” Emory Phoenix, vol. 37, no. 6, Apr. 1922, pp. 267-268.
- "Old Laughters." Bozart, vol. 2, no. 3, Jan.-Feb. 1929, p. 16.
- “Our National Deity.” Emory Campus, 1925, pp. 283-284.
- "Parlor Orpheus." Bozart, vol. 3, no. 2, Nov.-Dec. 1929, p. 5.
- “A Pastel.” Emory Phoenix, vol. 39, no. 6, Apr. 1924, p. 254.
- "Peniel." Bozart, vol. 2, no. 3, Jan.-Feb. 1929, pp. 11-12.
- “Perspective.” Emory Phoenix, vol. 39, no. 6, Apr. 1924, p. 244.
- “Philosophy.” Emory Phoenix, vol. 41, no. 5, Apr. 1926, p. 24.
- “Plus Ultra.” Opportunity: A Journal of Negro Life, vol. 6, no. 7, Jul. 1928, p. 209.
- "Professor of Biology." Bozart, vol. 2, no. 1, Sep.-Oct. 1928, p. 5.
- "Professor of Geometry." Bozart, vol. 2, no. 1, Sep.-Oct. 1928, p. 5.
- “Quatrain, on Fate.” Emory Phoenix, vol. 39, no. 6, Apr. 1924, p. 229.
- “Quatrain, on Guilt.” Emory Phoenix, vol. 40, no. 3, Dec. 1924, p. 86.
- “Rainbow Gold.” Emory Phoenix, vol. 40, no. 3, Dec. 1924, p. 73.
- "Requiem for an Architect." Atlanta Journal Magazine, vol. 47, no. 180, 25 Aug. 1929, p. 22.
- “Shadows.” Emory Phoenix, vol. 39, no. 6, Apr. 1924, p. 233.
- "Sonnet to a Silver Dollar. Bozart, vol. 2, no. 4, Mar.-Apr. 1929, p. 10.
- “Spring Song.” Emory Phoenix, vol. 39, no. 6, Apr. 1924, p. 219.
- “Star Birth.” Emory Phoenix, vol. 41, no. 2, Dec. 1926, p. 10.
- "Strategem in the Woods." Bozart, vol. 1, no. 6, Jul.-Aug. 1928, p. 7.
- “To a Friend.” Emory Phoenix, vol. 41, no. 3, Jan.-Feb. 1926, p. 20.
- "To Passion." Bozart, vol. 1, no. 1, Sep.-Oct. 1927, p. 2.
- "To Stone Mountain." Bozart, vol. 2, no. 6, Jul.-Aug. 1929, pp. 10-11.
- “Tunes by Pan.” Emory Phoenix, vol. 38, no. 3, Dec. 1922, p 124.
- Two Portraits: Auto-erotic and Vox Populi." Bozart and Contemporary Verse, vol. 3, no. 6, Jul.-Aug. 1930, p. 10.
- “Two Sonnets.” Voices, vol. 50, Nov. 1929, p. 185.
- "Two Sonnets for Eternal Armistice." Bozart and Contemporary Verse, vol. 4, no. 2, Nov.-Dec. 1930, p. 2.
- “Vampire.” Emory Phoenix, vol. 41, no. 2, Dec. 1925, p. 6.
- “Warning to Poets.” The Personalist, vol. 12, no. 3, 1931, p. 165.
