= Athie Sale Davis =

Athie Sale Davis (July 6, 1885 - 7 March 1974) was an American poet, educator, and editor from Enid, Oklahoma best known for editing the Davis Anthology of Newspaper Verse. She moved to Oklahoma City, Oklahoma in the 1930s and lived there until her death in 1974.

== Early life ==
Athea Eliza Sale was born in Oneida, Kansas to Charles T. Sale and Alice Noel. Her father participated in the Land Run of 1893, opening North Enid, Oklahoma's first lumber yard. She was educated at North Enid High School, graduating in 1901, Central State Normal College in Edmond, Oklahoma, and Phillips University. She was the president of the Oklahoma Christian Endeavor Union. and youth secretary for the Oklahoma Synodical Society. She was a founding member and corresponding secretary of the General J.A. Yeager Memorial chapter of the Confederated Southern Memorial Association, and the founding president of the Enid's George Edward Pickett chapter #1781 of the United Daughters of the Confederacy. She was also active in the Enid Delphian Club and Pythian Sisters Guild.

In 1919 she married Franklyn Pierre Davis, a medical doctor and politician. He ran for political office in Oklahoma as a Democrat, failing to be elected. Throughout the early 20th Century he was a candidate for Enid mayor, lieutenant governor, governor of Oklahoma, Oklahoma state senate, and congressman.

== Work ==
In 1919, Franklyn Davis created the Davis Anthology of Newspaper Verse series published in the 1920s - 1940s compiled of poems first printed in newspapers across the United States. The couple sifted through thousands of newspaper clippings each year. Davis read over 30,000 poems to make selections for the first ten editions of the anthology. Davis reviewed over 4500 poems published in 1938 for the 20th edition. The 1940 edition was selected from over 5200 poems published that year. After her husband died in 1932, Davis continued to edit the anthology series until 1942.

Notable contributors include Lucia Trent who appeared in the 1939 edition with her poem "To John Steinbeck." Both Trent and her husband Pennsylvania Poet Laureate Ralph Cheyney were published in the 1930 edition. Fellow Enid poet Theresa Druley Black appears in the 1934, 1935, and 1940 editions. Oklahoma Poet Laureate Bess Truitt appears in the 1934, 1940, and 1941 editions. Annice Calland is published in the 1928, 1930, 1932, and 1933 editions.

Scottie McKenzie Frasier has three poems published in the 1921 edition. Daniel Whitehead Hicky's "Requiem for a Young Poet" is published in the 1931 edition. New Jersey Poet Laureate Benjamin F. Musser is published in the 1927, 1929 and 1930 editions. Poet Laureate of Ohio Mabel Posegate was published in the 1939, 1940 and 1941 editions.

Annette Blackburn Ehler's "My Garden" is published in the 1924 edition. Athie Sale Davis had an essay published in the Chronicles of Oklahoma about Ehler in 1953.

== Publications ==
=== Poems ===
- "Rain" The Oklahoma Hornet October 17, 1946
- "How About You? The Oklahoma Hornet October 31, 1946
- "Friends" The Oklahoma Hornet November 14, 1946
- "Query" The Oklahoma Hornet January 9, 1947
- "Truth...At Last!" The Detroit News March 12, 1948
- "Ashes of a Twenty-Dollar Bill" The World-News April 19, 1948
- "What I Gave I Have" The Detroit News May 11, 1949
- "Wishful Thinking" The Greeneville Sun August 3, 1949
- "Heavenly Homecoming" Blackwell Journal-Tribune March 12, 1950
- “Happy Hoardings” Forward Magazine May 31, 1953
- "Times have Changed" The Bee July 3, 1953
- "February Statistics" The Valdosta Daily Times February 1, 1954
- "The Fabric We Weave" The Denison Bulletin March 9, 1978

=== Assistant Editor ===
- Davis Anthology of Newspaper Verse for 1919 F.P. Davis Company. 1920.
- Davis Anthology of Newspaper Verse for 1920 Frank P. Davis. 1921.
- Davis Anthology of Newspaper Verse for 1921 Frank P. Davis. 1922.
- Davis Anthology of Newspaper Verse for 1922 Frank P. Davis. 1923.
- Davis Anthology of Newspaper Verse for 1923 Frank P. Davis. 1924.
- Davis Anthology of Newspaper Verse for 1924 Frank P. Davis. 1925.
- Davis Anthology of Newspaper Verse for 1925 Frank P. Davis. 1926.
- Davis Anthology of Newspaper Verse for 1926 Frank P. Davis. 1927.
- Davis Anthology of Newspaper Verse for 1927 Frank P. Davis. 1928.
- Davis Anthology of Newspaper Verse for 1928 Frank P. Davis. 1929.
- Davis Anthology of Newspaper Verse for 1929 Frank P. Davis. 1930.
- Davis Anthology of Newspaper Verse for 1930 Frank P. Davis. 1931.
- Davis Anthology of Newspaper Verse for 1931 Frank P. Davis. 1932.

=== Editor ===
- Davis Anthology of Newspaper Verse for 1932 A.S. Davis. 1933.
- Davis Anthology of Newspaper Verse for 1933 A.S. Davis. 1934.
- Davis Anthology of Newspaper Verse for 1934 A.S. Davis. 1935.
- Davis Anthology of Newspaper Verse for 1935 A.S. Davis. 1936.
- Davis Anthology of Newspaper Verse for 1936 A.S. Davis. 1937.
- Davis Anthology of Newspaper Verse for 1937 A.S. Davis. 1938.
- Davis Anthology of Newspaper Verse for 1938 A.S. Davis. 1939.
- Davis Anthology of Newspaper Verse for 1939 Henry Herrison. 1940.
- Davis Anthology of Newspaper Verse for 1940 Henry Harrison. 1941.
- Davis Anthology of Newspaper Verse for 1941 Henry Harrison. 1942.
