= World Poetry Day =

Observance on 21 March

- Also called: WPD
- Observed by: UN Members
- Celebrations: UNESCO
- Observances: Promote poetry
- Begins: 2000
- Date: 21 March
- Next time: 21 March 2027
- Frequency: Annual
- First time: 2000; 26 years ago

World Poetry Day is celebrated on 21 March.

It was declared by UNESCO (the United Nations Educational, Scientific and Cultural Organization) at their Paris conference November 1999, "with the aim of supporting linguistic diversity through poetic expression and increasing the opportunity for endangered languages to be heard". The first international celebration on March 21 took place in the year 2000. Its purpose is to promote the reading, writing, publishing, and teaching of poetry throughout the world and, as the original UNESCO declaration says, to "give fresh recognition and impetus to national, regional, and international poetry movements".

In the 20th century the world community celebrated World Poetry Day on the 15th of October. The date was chosen to honor Pennsylvania Poet Laureate Ralph Cheyney. The tradition to keep an October date for national or international poetry day celebrations still holds in many countries. The United Kingdom generally uses the first Thursday in October, but elsewhere a different October, or even sometimes a November date, is celebrated.

== History of UNESCO World Poetry Day ==
Poets in both Turkey and Greece claim to be the originators of World Poetry Day. Vassilis Vassilikos, ambassador of Greece to UNESCO, proposed March 21 be named World Poetry Day. The date following the equinox was chosen by Greek poet Lydia Stefanou, and the first Greek celebration of Poetry Day was held on March 21, 1998, in Athens.

Turkish poet Tarık Günersel also proposed World Poetry Day to PEN International in 1997 in Edinburgh, Scotland. PEN International also claims to have originated World Poetry Day.

The 2021 World Poetry Day in the UNESCO headquarters in Paris was dedicated to the celebration of the 100th anniversary of the birth of the great Macedonian poet, writer, literary translator and linguistic scholar Blaže Koneski. At the same time, the British poet Carol Ann Duffy was announced as the recipient of the Golden Wreath Award of the Struga Poetry Evenings for 2021.

== History of October 15th observance ==
In 1937 Tessa Sweesy Webb celebrated the first Poetry Day in Ohio on the 3rd Friday of October by proclamation of the Ohio legislature. In 1947 Ralph Cheyney's wife, Lucia Trent, standardized the date of Poetry Day to honor Cheyney on the yearly anniversary of his passing. The holiday was first celebrated on October 15, 1947, as Texas Poets Day by proclamation of Governor Beauford H. Jester.

In 1950 Lucia Trent was a member of the National Poetry Day committee led by Dr. Etta Josephean Murfey which sought out an official recognition of the holiday by the president. It expanded first to New York, Idaho, and Pennsylvania in 1948 and by 1955, the National Poetry Day celebration grew to include 42 states. The organization had regional and state representatives.

In 1955 through the advocacy of Philadelphia poet Mary O'Connor, the holiday became World Poetry Day, with Cyprus and the Philippines being first to observe the holiday outside of the United States. By 1960 World Poetry Day was celebrated in 32 countries. O'Connor died in 1960.

In 1966 Dr. Frances Clark Handler of Florida incorporated the World Poetry Day Committee, Inc. as a non-profit to continue to promote the official adoption of the holiday by governments around the world. By the time of Trent's death in 1977, Poetry Day was celebrated in all 50 states and 41 countries. Dr. Handler continued to advocate for presidential recognition of the holiday throughout the 1980s. In 1982 and 1983 Florida Congressman Claude Pepper advocated for Poetry Day on the House floor. She died in 1993.

Due to the advocacy of the Poetry Day Committee, National Poetry Month was widely celebrated across the United States in October beginning in the 1950s. Prior to 1996 October was celebrated as national poetry month by the Academy of American Poets, National League of American Pen Women, National Federation of State Poetry Societies, and the California Federation of Chaparral Poets. In 1959 Academy of American Poets noted that over 100 poetry societies and 200 bookstores across the nation celebrated October as poetry month. Some celebrations in the 1980s and 1990s referred to October as World Poetry Month.

== See also ==
- United Nations
- National Poetry Day, held in October in the United Kingdom
- National Poetry Day in the United States - celebrated on October 15 since 1947
- National Poetry Month, held in April in the United States and Canada
- Honorary Poets, chosen on 1 November, Poetry Day in the Korea
