= National Poetry Day =

British campaign to promote

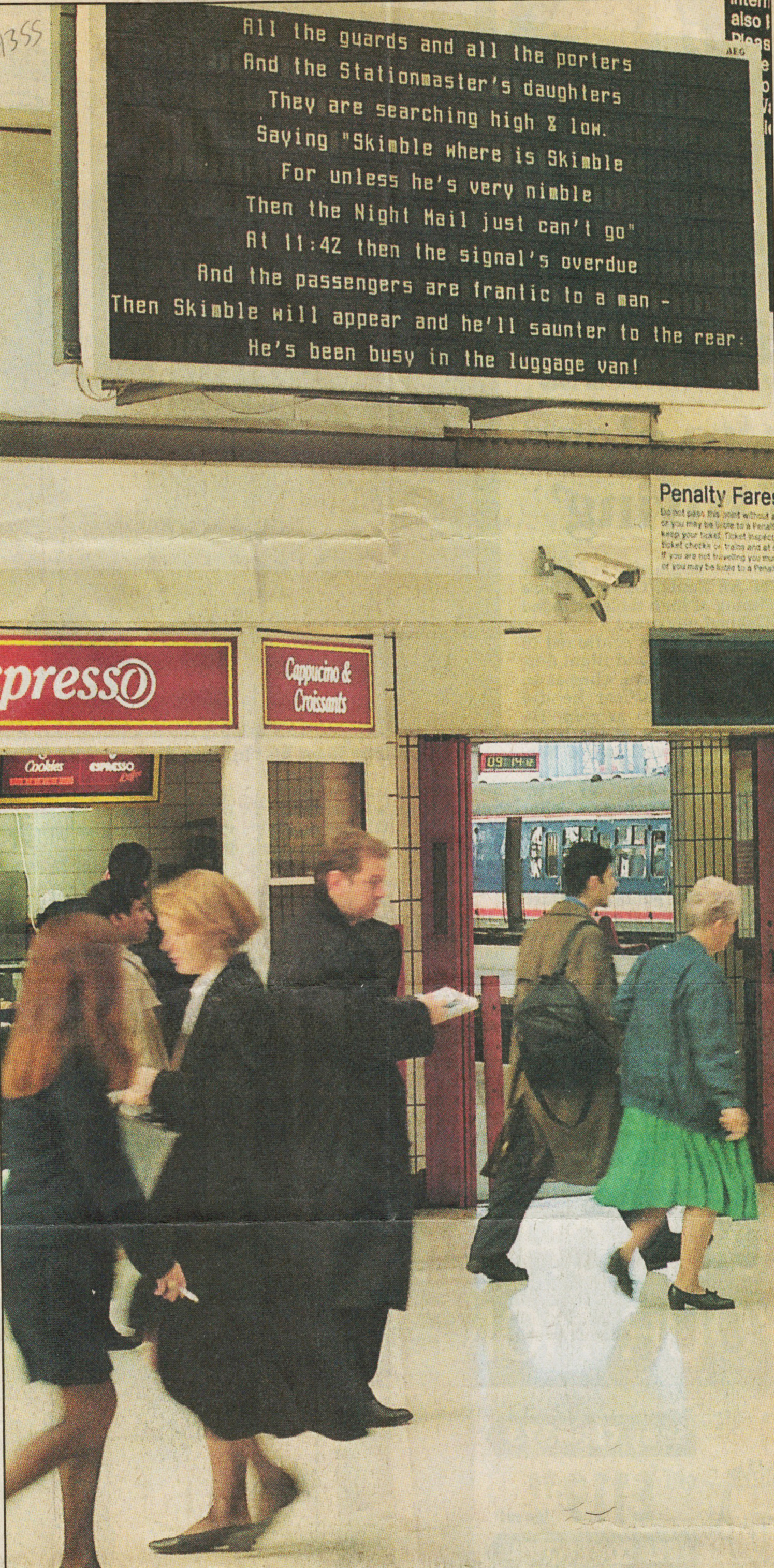
Poetry at Waterloo Station for National Poetry Day 1994

National Poetry Day is a British campaign to promote poetry, including public performances. Annually, on the first Thursday of October, events, readings and performances take place across the UK.

National Poetry Day was founded in 1994 by William Sieghart. Since its inception, it has engaged millions of people across the country with live events, classroom activities and broadcasts. National Poetry Day is coordinated by the charity Forward Arts Foundation, whose mission is to celebrate excellence in poetry and increase its audience; its other projects include the Forward Prizes for Poetry. The day is run in collaboration with partners including Arts Council England, Literature Wales, Poet in the City, the Southbank Centre, The Poetry Book Society, The Poetry Society, The Scottish Poetry Library, Poetry By Heart and The Poetry School.

Prince Charles performed in the 2016 National Poetry Day, reading Seamus Heaney's "The Shipping Forecast". In 2015, National Poetry Day poems were included in the Blackpool Illuminations. In 2020, BT commissioned Poet Laureate Simon Armitage to write "Something Clicked", a reflection on lockdown during the COVID-19 pandemic.

== History ==
National Poetry Day was founded in 1994 by William Sieghart, who said: "There are millions of talented poets out there and it's about time they got some recognition for their work. They shouldn’t be embarrassed about reading their work out aloud. I want people to read poetry on the bus on their way to work, in the street, in school and in the pub." National Poetry Day is celebrated around the UK. In 1994, the Radio Times wrote: "National Poetry Day has been created to prove that poetry has a place in everyone's life. From children chanting to advertising jingles and pop songs, it is used to entertain and communicate across the nation."

The Belfast Newsletter reported, "National Poetry Day swept Ulster yesterday, transforming ordinary citizens into part-time bards or budding Heaneys or Wordsworths." The Daily Telegraph reported that in London at Waterloo Station, "The announcement boards were given over to poems about trains by T. S. Eliot and Auden." The Times reported Chris Meade, then director of the Poetry Society, as saying: "Readers are finding a place for poetry in their lives again. You can read one between stations on the Northern Line. It fits well into the modern experience." The East Anglian Daily Times reported, "National Poetry Day was the cue for a stanza bonanza, with railway stations, classrooms, theatres and supermarkets bursting with verse and echoing to epics".

== Themes ==
Since 1999, National Poetry Day has been loosely “themed”. A list of previous themes is below:

- 2026: Wonder
- 2025: Play
- 2024: Counting
- 2023: Refuge
- 2022: The Environment
- 2021: Choice
- 2020: Vision
- 2019: Truth
- 2018: Change
- 2017: Freedom
- 2016: Messages
- 2015: Light
- 2014: Remember
- 2013: Water, water everywhere
- 2012: Stars
- 2011: Games
- 2010: Home
- 2009: Heroes and Heroines
- 2008: Work
- 2007: Dreams
- 2006: Identity
- 2005: The Future
- 2004: Food
- 2003: Britain
- 2002: Celebration
- 2001: Journeys
- 2000: Fresh Voices
- 1999: Song Lyrics

== See also ==
- National Poetry Month - a similar event in the United States
- National Poetry Day in the United States - celebrated on October 15 since 1947
- World Poetry Day
