= Benjamin F. Musser =

Poet Laureate of New Jersey

Benjamin Francis Musser, O.F.M. (February 3, 1889 – April 18, 1951) was a Catholic American poet, the first poet laureate of New Jersey, and the author of 45 books.

== Early life ==
Musser was born February 3, 1889, in Lancaster, Pennsylvania to Willis Benjamin Musser and Katharine Witmer Kaufman. He was born into an Episcopalian family. Musser had German heritage and was descended from John Mosser who emigrated to Pennsylvania in 1716. He is also related to Quaker Thomas Lloyd, Lieutenant Governor of the Province of Pennsylvania, and Thomas Cadwalader, Burgess of Trenton, New Jersey.

Musser studied at Yeates boarding school in Lancaster, Brooklyn Latin School, Episcopal Academy of Philadelphia, Nashtoah House of the P.E. Theological Seminary in Wisconsin, St. Joseph's College in Callicoon, New York, and Harvard.

In 1921, he married Helen Cobb Laning, daughter of Augustus C. Laning of Wilkes-Barre, Pennsylvania. They had two sons, Benjamin Francis and Fredric Antony Augustus (Brother Theophane Vernard, O.F.M.), and daughters, Nancy Gardiner and Ann Clare Harper.

== Catholicism ==
Musser took the additional name Francis on April 25, 1908, upon conversion to Catholicism at Our Lady of Good Counsel Church, Bryn Mawr. In 1909 Musser became a member of the Third Order of St. Francis, and in 1940 he became affiliated with the Order of Friars Minor. He was president of the Washington Catholic Poetry society, and member of the Catholic Writers' League of America, and Catholic Poetry Society of America. His poetry appeared in many Catholic and religious publications including The American Catholic, The Living Church, Madonna Bulletin, St. Antony's Magazine, The Catholic World, Catholic Standard and Times, Jewish Tribune, Current Catholic Verse, and The Catholic Weekly.

He died April 18, 1951, at his home in Ventnor City, New Jersey.

== Poetry ==
Musser published his first book in 1912. He was widely published in newspapers, journals, and anthologies. He was a member of the Poetry Societies of America and England, Empire Poetry League, and Order of Bookfellows. He was named the first poet laureate of New Jersey in 1934 by Earl A. Cuevas' Poet Laureate League.

== Publications ==
=== Books ===
- Angels of the Sanctuary (1912)
- Outside the Walls (1914)
- Chiaroscuro (1923)
- Pierrot (1924)
- Son of Momus (1926)
- Untamed (1927)
- Five Poets H. Harrison. (1928) (with Edith Mirick, Jewel Miller, Isobel Stone and Norman Macleod)
- Dipped in Aloes (1929)
- Riding at Anchor (1929)
- Bucolics and Caviar (1930)
- The Passion Called Poetry (1930)
- Selected Poems (1930)
- Straws on the Wind (1931)
- Velvet Chain (1931)
- Fifteen Sonnets (1931)
- Ernest Heartsock: An Appreciation (1931)
- Bensbook (1931)
- A Wreath for the Living (1931)
- De Re Franciscana (1932)
- Franciscan Poets (1932)
- One-Man Show (1932)
- Diary of a Twelve Year Old (1932)
- Poems 1930-33 (1933)
- A Chaplet of Sanctuaries (1934)
- Star-Gazer (with J. Graydon Jeffries) (1934)
- The End of Singing (1935)
- The Marvelous Boy (1937)
- Interior Castle (1937)
- What is Your Name (1937)
- The Queen of Arts (1937)

=== Editor ===
- How to Profit by that Impulse (1929) (compiled with Ralph Cheyney and Lucia Trent)
- First Japm Anthology (1930)
- As the Poet Says (1931)
- Seeds of Laurel (1932)
- With the Makers (1934)
- Golden Bow (1934)
- House of Bread (1935)
- Canticles for St. Francis (1936)
- Kyrie Eleison: Two Hundred Litanies (1946)

=== Anthologies ===
- "Pan in Winter" Braithwaite's Anthology of Magazine Verse (1926)
- "Of a Certain Poet" Braithwaite's Anthology of Magazine Verse (1926)
- "Wreckage" Braithwaite's Anthology of Magazine Verse (1926)
- "Isolation" Current Catholic Verse 1926
- Current Catholic Verse (1927)
- "Salome" Davis Anthology of Newspaper Verse (1927)
- "Jongleur de Dieu" Braithwaite's Anthology of Magazine Verse (1927)
- Grub Street Book of Verse (1927)
- America Arraigned! (1928)
- Grub Street Book of Verse (1928)
- "An Old Garden" Braithwaite's Anthology of Magazine Verse (1928)
- "Ballad of a New Villon" Braithwaite's Anthology of Magazine Verse (1928)
- "To a Mechanic" Braithwaite's Anthology of Magazine Verse (1928)
- "S-4" Braithwaite's Anthology of Magazine Verse (1928)
- "Loneliness" The Light of Day H. Harrison. (1929)
- Braithwaite's Anthology of Magazine Verse (1929)
- "Journey" Davis Anthology of Newspaper Verse (1929)
- Unrest: The Rebel Poets Anthology (1929)
- An Anthology of Revolutionary Poetry (1929)
- Grub Street Book of Verse (1930)
- Davis Anthology of Newspaper Verse (1930)
- Guardian of God's Lilies (1945)

=== Poems ===
- "Children" The Irish Standard January 22, 1916
- "Birds in the Dawn" Irish Weekly Independent May 19, 1917
- "War" The W.A. Record November 24, 1917
- "Vocation" Southern Cross January 24, 1919
- "The Greater Joy" The Catholic Weekly April 15, 1920
- "The Also-Ran" The Catholic Weekly May 12, 1921
- "Ballad of the Sorrowful Mother" The Catholic Weekly February 23, 1922
- "Paschal Promise" Atlantic City Gazette-Review April 19, 1924
- "Annunciation" Catholic World Vol. 124, 1926.
- "Danse Macabre" Bozart and Contemporary Verse, Vol 1. No. 1, Sept/Oct 1927
- "Masks" Bozart and Contemporary Verse, Vol 1. No. 1, Sept/Oct 1927
- "Danse Macabre" Bozart and Contemporary Verse, Vol 1. No. 1, Sept/Oct 1927
- "Labels" Troubadour Vol. 1 No. 3, September 1928
- "Escape" Bozart and Contemporary Verse, Vol 3. No.3, Jan/Feb 1929
- "Clean Linen in Public" Troubadour Vol. 1, No. 6, March 1929
- "Humorist" Bozart and Contemporary Verse, Vol 3. No.4, March/April 1929
- "Conversation" The Kaleidoscope, Vol. 1, No. 1 May 1929
- "Wings" The Kaleidoscope, Vol. 1, No. 6 October 1929
- "Fair and Warmer" The Kaleidoscope, Vol. 1, No. 6 October 1929
- "Pillar of Cloud" The Sacramento Bee April 5, 1930
- "Ebb" The Virginian-Pilot February 11, 1934
- "To Ernest Hartsock" The Palm Beach Post April 29, 1934
- "Gossamer Quarry" Ridgewood Herald-News September 28, 1934
- "Missionary Ridge at Night" Ridgewood Herald-News April 12, 1935
- "Stars and Sea Stars" Ridgewood Herald-News August 23, 1935
- "Star Riders" Waukegan News-Sun September 5, 1935
- "An Unceasing Promise" The Advocate January 9, 1936
- "Fool’s Tree" Ridgewood Herald-News May 1, 1936
- "Non Scripsit" The Central New Jersey Home News October 15, 1936
- "And on Earth Peace to Men of Good Will" Lake Shore Visitor December 4, 1936
- "Rabboni!" The Tablet March 20, 1937
- "Neustra Senora de Pilar" The Advocate July 29, 1937
- "The Bird below the Waves" Ridgewood Herald-News March 23, 1939
- "Poland Can Say" Ridgewood Herald-News March 28, 1940
