= Villa Rosa (Fayetteville, Arkansas) =

Historic house in Arkansas, United States

- U.S. National Register of Historic Places
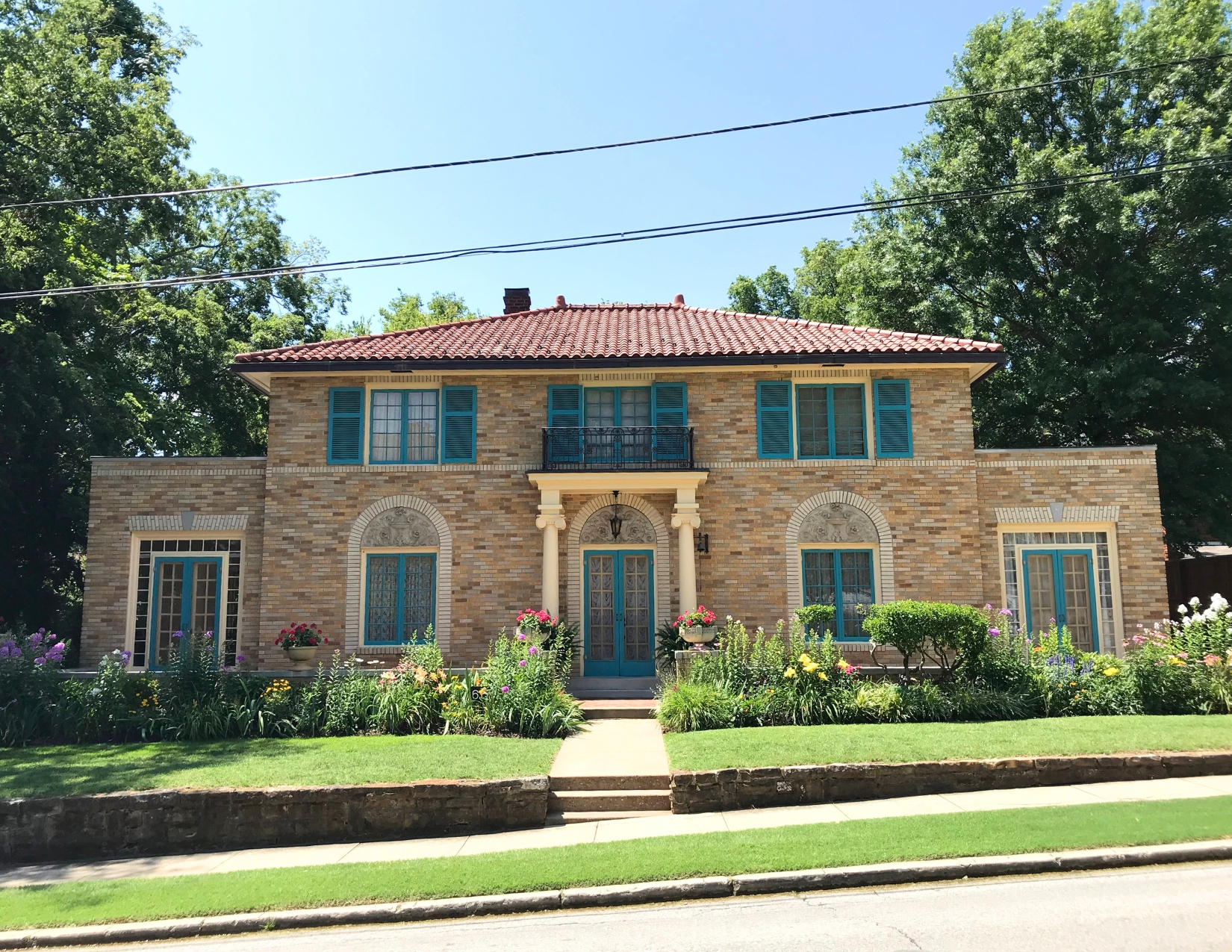
- Villa Rosa Marinoni Villa Rosa, 2019

- Location within Arkansas Location within the United States
- Location: 617 W. Lafayette, Fayetteville, Arkansas
- Coordinates: 36°4′5″N 94°10′3″W
- Area: less than one acre
- Architect: Ratliff & Bird; Jackson, W.C.
- Architectural style: Late 19th And 20th Century Revivals, Renaissance, Italian Renaissance
- NRHP reference No.: 90001946
- Added to NRHP: December 27, 1990

The Villa Rosa is a historic house at 617 West Lafayette in Fayetteville, Arkansas. It is a two-story wood-frame structure with a brick exterior and a tile hip roof. The brick is variegated light colors, reflective of the Renaissance Revival style also evident in the arches surmounting the first-floor windows and doorway. The entrance is sheltered by a portico with classical columns and a small balcony on top. The house was built in 1925 by Rosa Zagnoni Marinoni, a prominent regional activist for women's rights and the Arkansas poet laureate in 1953.

The house was listed on the National Register of Historic Places in 1990.

== See also ==
- National Register of Historic Places listings in Washington County, Arkansas
