= Ralph Cheyney (poet) =

Poet Laureate of Pennsylvania from 1934 to 1939

Edward Ralph Cheyney (March 14, 1896 - October 15, 1941) was the Poet Laureate of Pennsylvania from 1934 to 1939. He was a professor of creative writing, an editor, a lecturer, and a pacifist. World Poetry Day and National Poetry Day celebrated annually since 1947 on October 15th honors the anniversary of his death.

== Early life and education ==
Ralph Cheyney was born in Philadelphia, Pennsylvania in 1896 to Edward Potts Cheyney, a history professor at the University of Pennsylvania, and Gertrude Squires Cheyney. His family is descended from Squire Thomas Cheyney who informed General George Washington during the Battle of Brandywine that the British were flanking him to the north. Squire Cheyney was later appointed to the Pennsylvania Ratifying Convention to ratify the United States Constitution. Through his grandmother Frances Potts, he is descended from John Potts, the founder of Pottstown, Pennsylvania. Ralph Cheyney had two siblings, Ernest Waldron and Alice Squires Cheyney. He was the nephew of George W. Cheyney and John K. Cheyney. He studied at the University of Pennsylvania, the University of Wisconsin, New York University, and the University of Southern California. Golden State University gave him an honorary doctorate of letters in 1941.

While at the University of Pennsylvania, Cheney was a member of the University Peace League and planned to join Henry Ford's Peace Party. On September 27, 1917 after giving a speech against conscription at a meeting of the League of Conscientious Objectors at Labor Temple, Cheyney was sentenced to 30 days in jail for conspiracy to evade the selective service draft law.

On April 19, 1917 he married illustrator Louise D. Cook. They had a daughter, Gertrude Louise, whose poetry was published in newspapers under the pen name Trudy Quida beginning at age 6. Louise Cook remarried to Ye Zhupei on February 19, 1927, taking on the name Weda Yap.

On January 22, 1927 Cheyney married fellow poet and teacher Lucia Trent, daughter of Alice Lyman and William Peterfield Trent, a Columbia University English professor. The couple met in 1926 in New York while Cheyney was involved in the Greenwich Village poetry scene. They had three children, Alice, Trent, and Ralph. Cheyney and Trent taught at Pasadena Junior College. Cheyney was fired in 1940 for his activism with the American Peace Crusade, an organization that opposed the military draft. Lucia Trent resigned in solidarity with her husband.

== Poetry ==
In 1928 Cheyney and Trent published America Arraigned! as a memorial to Sacco and Vanzetti who were executed on August 23rd, 1927. It included contributions by poets across the political spectrum who opposed their execution, including Vincent Godfrey Burns, Benjamin Musser, Louis Ginsberg, and Edna St. Vincent Millay. Cheyney was a member of the I.W.W. which organized actions and passed resolutions in solidarity with Sacco and Vanzetti to try to prevent their execution.

In 1928 Ralph Cheyney and Jack Conroy founded the Rebel Poets Club, issuing three anthologies under the title Unrest between 1929 and 1931, and a magazine entitled Rebel Poet in 1931. Members read their works on WEVD radio. It grew to encompass an international membership. The group published An Anthology of Revolutionary Poetry edited by Marcus Graham in 1929. Ralph Cheyney and Lucia Trent formed the Marcus Graham Defense Committee to fight against Graham's deportation to Canada. The US government arrested and attempted to deport Graham four times, charging him with being a part of an organization that advocated violent overthrow of the government, and citing An Anthology of Revolutionary Poetry as proof of intent. The anthology included work by over 400 poets including Robert Burns, Ralph Waldo Emerson, Henry Wadsworth Longfellow, Edgar Allan Poe, and Robert Louis Stevenson. Charlie Chaplin, Upton Sinclair, and Charles Erskine Scott Wood were among those joining the effort. The Rebel Poets also publicly advocated for the release of Thomas Mooney and Warren Billings who were falsely charged with the Preparedness Day bombing in San Francisco.

By 1933 Cheyney and Conroy had parted ways, citing ideological differences in the selection criteria for poetry. Cheyney, who identified as a "left-wing socialist," wanted to reflect a wide spectrum of the left in Rebel Poet magazine, but Conroy adhered to the Communist Party line, and began a new magazine called The Anvil.

In 1941 Cheyney wrote a poem honoring CPUSA Chairman Earl Browder entitled "America Speaks". Cheyney also signed a protest letter of the John Reed Club that was published in the New York Times in 1930, protesting the imprisonment of 1,600 people in the span of 2 months for engaging in political speech. Both Cheyney and Trent were opposed to a bill introduced by Martin Dies Jr., the first chairman of the House Committee Investigating Un-American Activities, which would have deported foreign born Communists in 1932, and they signed the John Reed Club's petition against it. Lucia Trent continued to oppose the Dies Committee, aligning herself with the National Federation for Constitutional Liberties in 1943. Trent also denounced the anti-communism of the Daughters of the American Revolution in a 1931 telegram, stating that the organization had abandoned liberal principles for reactionary ones.

Cheyney and Trent operated a poetry writing correspondence course, the Cheyney-Trent Course in Poetry Technique, publishing four anthologies of student poetry between 1930 and 1932, entitled Pilgrims to Parnassus, Spring Choral, Voices in the Dawn and Early Harvest.

In 1934 Cheyney was named the Poet Laureate of Pennsylvania by the Poet Laureate League, an organization headed by Earl A. Cuevas. Elliot Kays Stone was appointed as Lieutenant Poet Laureate in 1935 when Cheyney moved to California. Cheyney resigned from the position in 1938.

In 1936 Cheyney and Trent founded the Western Poets Congress, which held its first meetings at the Wistaria Festival in Sierra Madre, California. By 1939 the Poets Congress had assembled more than 500 poets from across the United States, and advocated that poets take a public stand against fascism and war in their works. In 1940 Cheyney asked members to sign a pledge not to glorify war, but instead encourage brotherhood through their poetry. In 1940 Marcus Z. Lytle, Katherine Couer, and Jennie Zimmerman founded the California Federation of Chaparral Poets in opposition to the pacifist politics of the Western Poets Congress. The sixth and final Western Poets Congress was held in San Antonio, Texas in October 1941 with an estimated 600 attendees.

== Works ==
=== Poems ===
- "Tramp, Tramp!" London Daily Herald, May 17, 1913.
- "She," Ledger-Enquirer, May 7, 1916.
- "The HC of L", The Quarry Workers Journal, May 1, 1918.
- "The Rebel", The Australian Worker: Official Journal of the Australian Workers' Union, March 6, 1919.
- "Nocturne", Ledger-Star, July 12, 1922.
- "Escape", Ledger-Star, July 12, 1922.
- "To Sacco and Vanzetti", The Standard-Times, August 10, 1927
- "Woods Retreat", Haldeman-Julius Weekly, June 6, 1925.
- "America Speaks", The Daily Worker, July 3, 1941.
- "Debs was Big," The American Guardian, October 10, 1941.
- "A True Peace" with Lucia Trent, St. Cloud Times, May 25, 1942.

=== Poetry collections ===
- I, A Minor Poet, 1924.
- Touch and Go, H. Harrison, New York, 1926
- Cheyney, Ralph, and Trent, Lucia, Dreamers' House Robert Packard & Company, 1931.
- Cheyney, Ralph, and Trent, Lucia, Sierra Dreamers' House Poetry Publishers, Philadelphia, 1935.
- Cheyney, Ralph, and Trent, Lucia, Thank You, America! Suttonhouse, Los Angeles, 1937.
- Cheyney, Ralph, and Trent, Lucia, Lady Godiva and St. Satyr Haggland, 1941.

=== Editor ===
- Cheyney, Ralph, The Independent Poetry Anthology 1925.
- Cheyney, Ralph, The Independent Poetry Anthology 1926.
- Cheyney, Ralph, and Trent, Lucia, America Arraigned! Dean & Co., New York, 1928.
- Conroy, Jack, and Cheyney, Ralph, Unrest: A Rebel Poet's Anthology Arthur H. Stockwell, Ltd., London, 1929
- Cheyney, Ralph, and Trent, Lucia, Pilgrims to Parnassus Bozart Press, Atlanta, 1930.
- Cheyney, Ralph, and Trent, Lucia, Spring Choral Contemporary Vision Press, 1930.
- Conroy, Jack, and Cheyney, Ralph, Unrest: A Rebel Poet's Anthology, Vol. 2. Studies Publications, Columbus, Ohio, 1930.
- Conroy, Jack, and Cheyney, Ralph, Unrest 1931, H. Harrison, New York, 1931.
- Cheyney, Ralph, and Trent, Lucia, Voices in the Dawn: A Verse Anthology Studies Publication, 1931.
- Cheyney, Ralph, and Trent, Lucia, Early Harvest Poetry Publishers, Philadelphia, 1932.
- Cheyney, Ralph, Banners of Brotherhood: An anthology of social vision verse, Driftwind Press, Vermont, 1933.
- Cheyney, Ralph, and Trent, Lucia, More Power to Poets: a Plea for More Poetry In Life, More Life In Poetry. H. Harrison, New York, 1934.
- Cheyney, Ralph, ed., Sonnets: An Anthology of Contemporary Verse H. Harrison, New York, 1939.
- Cheyney, Ralph, and Trent, Lucia, Music in Minature: An Anthology of Short Forms, The Carleton Company, San Antonio, 1942.

== Death ==
Ralph Cheyney died on October 15, 1941, at age 45 from appendicitis in Harlington, Texas. The couple had moved to San Antonio in March 1941 after Cheyney was appointed curator of the Avalon Poetry Shrine. He is buried in San Antonio.

== Legacy ==
In 1937 Tessa Sweesy Webb celebrated the first Poetry Day in Ohio on the 3rd Friday of October by proclamation of the Ohio legislature. In 1947 Ralph Cheyney's wife, Lucia Trent, standardized the date of Poetry Day to honor Cheyney on the yearly anniversary of his passing. The holiday was first celebrated on October 15th, 1947 as Texas Poets Day by proclamation of Governor Beauford H. Jester.

In 1950 Lucia Trent was a member of the National Poetry Day committee led by Dr. Etta Josephean Murfey which sought out an official recognition of the holiday by the president. It expanded first to New York, Idaho, and Pennsylvania in 1948 and by 1955, the National Poetry Day celebration grew to include 42 states. The organization had regional and state representatives.

In 1955 through the advocacy of Philadelphia poet Mary O'Connor, the holiday became World Poetry Day, with Cyprus and the Philippines being first to observe the holiday outside of the United States. By 1960 World Poetry Day was celebrated in 32 countries. O'Connor died in 1960.

In 1966 Dr. Frances Clark Handler of Florida incorporated the World Poetry Day Committee, Inc. as a non-profit to continue to promote the official adoption of the holiday by governments around the world. By the time of Trent's death in 1977, Poetry Day was celebrated in all 50 states and 41 countries. Dr. Handler continued to advocate for presidential recognition of the holiday throughout the 1980s. In 1982 and 1983 Florida Congressman Claude Pepper advocated for Poetry Day on the House floor. She died in 1993.

Due to the advocacy of the Poetry Day Committee, National Poetry Month was widely celebrated across the United States in October beginning in the 1950s. Prior to 1996 October was celebrated as national poetry month by the Academy of American Poets, National League of American Pen Women, National Federation of State Poetry Societies, and the California Federation of Chaparral Poets. In 1959 Academy of American Poets noted that over 100 poetry societies and 200 bookstores across the nation celebrated October as poetry month. Some celebrations in the 1980s and 1990s referred to October as World Poetry Month.
