= Margaret McClure Stitt =

American dramatist

- Born: September 10, 1886; Rarden, Ohio, U.S.
- Died: December 10, 1979 (aged 93)
- Education: College of Music of Cincinnati
- Occupations: Composer; lecturer; playwright

Margaret Lorna McClure Stitt (September 10, 1886 – December 10, 1979) was an American composer, lecturer, and playwright whose compositions were performed at the White House in 1936.

== Life and career ==
Margaret McClure was born in Rarden, Ohio. Her mother died when Stitt was three years old, and she moved to Locust Grove, Ohio, to live with her mother's family. Her first music instruction was organ lessons with Philomela Cutter, a cousin in Locust Grove. In 1904 and 1905, Stitt attended the College of Music of Cincinnati where she studied with Frederick Hoffman and Sidney Durst. She left school after injuring her hand, possibly from too much, or incorrect, piano practice. She taught in Waverly, Ohio, until returning to school in 1909 at the Indianapolis Conservatory to study with Emiliano Renaud and teach at the Conservatory's day school.

In October 1912, Margaret married Dr. Howard Stitt, and they had three children: Bob, Martha, and Howard. In 1923 the family moved to Vienna so Dr. Stitt could study otolaryngology. He was also a skilled violin maker. After a few years, they returned to Cincinnati, and Stitt became involved with a theater workshop run by John Redhead Froome at the Cincinnati College of Music, where she composed operettas and wrote plays. Stitt belonged to many clubs in Cincinnati, including the Cincinnati Woman's Club, the Delta Omicron music sorority, the Hyde Park Music Club, the National League of American Pen Women, the MacDowell Society, the Matinee Musical, and the Woman's Music Club. Here she met writers and set their work to music, including Katherine Hunter Coe, Annette Patton Cornell, George Elliston, Frances Emminger, Irene Grueninger, Mabel Posegate, and B. Y. Williams.

In 1927, the Aeolian Company included Stitt's composition "Lullaby" in its Classified Catalog of Interpretations of the World's Best Music Recorded by More Than Two Hundred and Fifty Pianists for the Duo-Art Reproducing Piano. In 1931, Stitt accompanied singers Verna Carrega, Sigurd Nilssen, and Abby Morrison Ricker in a recital of her songs for the New York Madrigal Society. The Musical Courier described it as "an unusually well-balanced and interesting program. . . " In 1936, a movement of Stitt's Quintet for Piano and Strings (Soiree) was performed for Eleanor Roosevelt at the White House in a concert by members of the National League of American Pen Women.

Stitt stopped most of her composing in 1937 when her son Bob died suddenly while away at college. She composed only one work, "Song for Adele", after his death. Instead, she presented 165 lectures on 52 topics to many organizations, including civic clubs and the University of Cincinnati extension. Her lecture topics encompassed American music, highlights in the history of medicine, and poet Elizabeth Barrett Browning, among others.

Stitt received several awards and honors. One of her plays (unspecified) won an award from the National League of American Pen Women. The Cincinnati Literary and Musical Society funded a scholarship to the University of Cincinnati in honor of Stitt, as well as the Margaret McClure Stitt award for piano.

== Works ==
Some of Stitt's compositions are archived in the Marian Anderson Collection at the University of Pennsylvania Penn Libraries. Her works were published by Baker's Plays, Eldridge Entertainment House, G. Schirmer Inc., and W. H. Willis & Co. Her publications included:

=== Band ===
- Japinsky March and Two Step

=== Chamber ===
- Soiree (string quartet and piano)

=== Opera ===
- one opera
- two operettas for children

=== Plays ===
- Mixed Doubles, a Comedy in Three Acts
- Never Too Old: a Farce Comedy in Two Acts
- Patient 309
- Sadie's Oats: a One Act Comedy
- Sharing Christmas: a Musical Program Play

=== Vocal ===
- "All's Well That Ends Well"
- "Blowing Bubbles" (text by Sarah Grames Clark)
- Choral Grace (women's chorus)
- "Circus Days" (text by George Elliston)
- "Cock-A-Doodle-Doo" (text by Sarah Grames Clark)
- "From a Trundle Bed" (text by George Elliston)
- "If I - " (text by T. C. O'Donnell)
- "Little Leaves" (voice, flute and piano; text by George Elliston)
- "Lullaby"
- "My Gold Balloon"
- "(The) Old Woman Who Lived in a Shoe"
- "One Umbrella Built for Two" (text by Sarah Grames Clark)
- "Ophelia" (text by Mabel Ponegate)
- Sharing Christmas: a Musical Program Play
- "Song for Adele" (text by Annette Patton Cornell)
- "Song for Love" (text by Anne Lloyd; melody from Andante Semplice, opus 23 by Peter Tchaikovsky; arranged by Stitt)
- "Songs of Childhood"
- "Spelling Bee" (text by Edna Ann Steward)
- "Ten Songs"
- "Time the Conqueror" (text by George Elliston)
- Twelve Poems (soprano and piano; text by George Elliston)
- "When Love is Here"
- "(The) Yankees Are Coming!"
