= Benjamin W. Wells =

American scholar & editor (1856–1923)

Benjamin Willis Wells (31 January 1856 – 1923) was a United States scholar and editor.

== Biography ==
Wells graduated from Harvard in 1877 and took his PhD from Harvard in 1880. Afterwards, he studied for a while in Berlin. He was a fellow of Johns Hopkins University. He worked at Providence, Rhode Island, from 1882 to 1887. From 1891 to 1898, he was professor of modern languages in the University of the South at Sewanee, Tennessee, then joined the editorial staff of The Churchman in New York City from 1899 to 1912.

== Works ==
He contributed to the New International Encyclopedia of Dodd, Mead and Company. He published Modern German Literature, (1895); Modern French Literature, (1897); and A Century of French Fiction, (1898), which includes text about Edmond François Valentin About. With William P. Trent, he edited Colonial Prose and Poetry, 1607-1775, an anthology (1902).
