= Isabel Fiske Conant =

American poet

- Conant, from a 1936 publication
- Born: Isabella Howe Fiske; April 29, 1874; Wellesley, Massachusetts, U.S.
- Died: November 12, 1953 (aged 79); Jacksonville, Florida, U.S.
- Other name: Isabella Fiske Conant
- Occupations: Poet, playwright

Isabella Howe Fiske Conant (April 29, 1874 – November 12, 1953) was an American poet and playwright based in Massachusetts. She wrote pageants to be performed by large casts, and published several collections of her poetry.

== Early life and education ==
Conant was born in Wellesley, Massachusetts, the daughter of Joseph Emery Fiske and Abby Sawyer Hastings Fiske. Her father was a Union Army veteran of the American Civil War and served in the Massachusetts legislature. He also wrote a history of Wellesley, which her older sister Ellen Ware Fiske expanded. She graduated from Wellesley College in 1896, and completed a master's degree there in 1905.

== Career ==
Conant wrote poetry, plays, and pageants. Her poetry was published in national periodicals including Ainslee's, Lippincott's Monthly, Photo-Era, The Craftsman, Poetry, and Opportunity. In 1920, a cast of 300 (including 40 mounted horsemen) performed her Acropolis: A Masque of a City in Central Park. Her Clouds of the Sun was performed in 1922 at a New York benefit for French war orphans, at The Cloisters. She also lectured on poetry and judged poetry contests.

Fiske's poetry was widely reviewed, but not always fondly. "In A Field of Folk by Isabella Howe Fiske, there are one hundred and ten pieces of verse, none of any particular merit or demerit," began a 1903 review in The Los Angeles Times, commenting further that "there is no great quantity of thought crowded into the foreground."

== Publications ==
=== Poetry and hymns ===
- "Retribution" (1896, poem in college yearbook)
- Verses (1900, poetry collection)
- "Ideas", "In the Orchard", "Premonitions" and "In Manuscript" (1903, poems)
- A Field of Folk (1903, poetry collection)
- "Chatterton", "Kaleidoscopic Fancies", "Reproof", "Rough Dry", and "The Valley" (1905, poems)
- "The End of the Day", "A Swallow's Flight", "A Bird Walk", "Mirage", and "Babel" (1906, poems)
- "In Season" (1908, poem)
- "The House Remembers" (1916, poem)
- "Somewhere in France" (1918, poem)
- "Death Stays the Hand of the Sculptor" (1922, poem in tribute to Solon Borglum)
- "Little History" and "Eleonora Duse" (1924, poems)
- Many Wings (1924, poetry collection)
- Frontier (1925, poetry collection)
- "Anesthetic", "Sane", and "Portrait" (1925, poems)
- "Our Lady and Her Knight" (1927, poem)
- "At Thomas Mosher's", "Carpenter", "On the Levee", and "A Revederla" (1928, poems)
- "Seventh Avenue" (1929, poem)
- "Dark Outlook" and "Loom of Time" (1931, poems)
- Aisle-Seat (1937, poetry collection)
- Orange Feather (1940, poetry collection)
- "Lord of the Sunlight, Lord of the Starlight" (hymn)
- "Upstairs in the Pine Boughs" (hymn)

=== Plays and pageants ===
- Clouds of the Sun (1904, short play)
- A Comedy of the Exile (1906, short Biblical play)
- Gabriel: A pageant of vigil (1912, pageant)
- Pageant of the Charles River (1914, pageant)
- Persephone (1914, pageant)
- Will o the World: A Shakespearean tercentenary masque (1916, pageant)
- Acropolis: A Masque of a City (1920, pageant)

== Personal life ==
Fiske married Walter Aiken Conant in 1910. Her husband died in 1946. She wintered in Florida in her later years, and died there in 1953, in her late seventies.
