= National Poetry Month =

Annual observance each April

National Poetry Month, a celebration of poetry which takes place each April, was introduced in 1996 and is organized by the Academy of American Poets as a way to increase awareness and appreciation of poetry in the United States. The Academy of American Poets' website Poets.org serves as a hub for information about local poetry events during the month. The organization also provides free educational resources to teachers for classroom celebrations and activities, and commissions an annual festival poster. Since 1998, National Poetry Month has also been celebrated each April in Canada.

== History ==
National Poetry Month was inspired by the success of Black History Month, held each February, and Women's History Month, held in March. In 1995, the Academy of American Poets convened a group of publishers, booksellers, librarians, literary organizations, poets, and teachers to discuss the need and usefulness of a similar monthlong holiday to celebrate poetry. The first National Poetry Month was held in 1996.

In 1998, the Academy of American Poets joined the American Poetry & Literacy Project to distribute 100,000 free books of poetry from New York to California during National Poetry Month. On April 22, President Clinton and the First Lady hosted a gala at the White House that featured Poets Laureate Robert Pinsky, Robert Hass, and Rita Dove.

For National Poetry Month in 2001, the Academy of American Poets invited people to "vote" for poets they most wanted to have a postage stamp. More than 10,000 people cast ballots, with Langston Hughes receiving the most votes. The vote tally was sent to the United States Postal Service, which issued a Langston Hughes stamp in January 2002.

On April 5, 2005, the Empire State Building was illuminated with blue lights to mark the 10th anniversary of National Poetry Month.

In 2006, the Academy of American Poets launched Poem-a-Day, publishing one new poem on its website Poets.org each day during the month-long celebration. Poem-a-Day is now a daily, year-long series, which has been syndicated by King Features.

In 2012, the Academy of American Poets launched the Dear Poet project, which invites students to read and write poems during National Poetry Month, some of which are published on Poets.org. The project is accompanied by a lesson plan offered to K-12 teachers for free.

Each year, a special poster is commissioned by the Academy of American Poets for National Poetry Month, with almost 150,000 copies distributed to schools, libraries, and community centers for free. In the past, posters have been designed by noted graphic designers such as Chip Kidd and Milton Glaser. The 2015 National Poetry Month poster was designed by New Yorker illustrator Roz Chast.

Numerous books and poetry compilations have been published acknowledging National Poetry Month, such as The Knopf National Poetry Month Collection by Random House and Celebrating National Poetry Month by children's book author and poet Bruce Larkin.

In 2021, the Andrew W. Mellon Foundation and the Academy of American Poets commemorated the 25th anniversary of National Poetry Month.

== Purpose ==
Like Black History Month, the celebration of poetry each April has grown and established itself organically, in both official and unofficial ways. Each year, publishers, booksellers, educators and literary organizations use April to promote poetry: publishers often release and publicize their poetry titles in April, teachers and librarians focus on poetry units during the month; and bookstores and reading series frequently hold special readings. National Poetry Writing Month encourages writing a poem a day in celebration.

== Proclamations ==
In a proclamation issued on April 1, 1996, President Bill Clinton declared: "National Poetry Month offers us a welcome opportunity to celebrate not only the unsurpassed body of literature produced by our poets in the past, but also the vitality and diversity of voices reflected in the works of today's American poetry….Their creativity and wealth of language enrich our culture and inspire a new generation of Americans to learn the power of reading and writing at its best." In addition, similar official National Poetry Month proclamation have been issued by mayors from towns and cities across the country, including New York City, Los Angeles, Chicago, Tucson, and Washington, D.C.

== Poetry & the Creative Mind ==
In 2002, the academy organized the first Poetry & the Creative Mind gala to raise funds in support of National Poetry Month, and it has become an annual event. Each year the academy invites some of America's leading artists, scholars, and public figures to read their favorite poems. Hosted each year by the three-time Academy Award-winning actress Meryl Streep, the event has featured readings by Liam Neeson, Tony Kushner, Maya Lin, Sam Waterston, Suzan-Lori Parks, Minnie Driver, Dan Rather, Agnes Gund, Frank Rich, Diane von Fürstenberg, Wynton Marsalis, Alan Alda, Wendy Whelan, Mike Wallace, Dianne Wiest, Oliver Sacks, Gloria Vanderbilt, William Wegman, and Christopher Durang, among others.

== Debate ==
National Poetry Month has also sparked some debate among writers, most notably in 1999 from poet and academic Charles Bernstein. Critics suggest that National Poetry Month trivializes the art form and floods the market with books in a matter of just a few weeks, overwhelming readers.

== International recurring celebrations ==
=== United Kingdom ===
National Poetry Day, founded in 1995 by William Sieghart, is celebrated on the first or second Thursday of October in the United Kingdom; this has become an established fixture in the cultural calendar. Events take place in schools, pubs, arts centres, bookshops, libraries, buses, trains and Women's Institutes, and the day is the focus for media attention for poetry. National Poetry Day is co-ordinated by the Forward Arts Foundation (a registered charity), which also runs the Forward Prizes for Poetry. A theme is chosen in consultation with the National Poetry Day partners: in 2015, National Poetry Day falls on October 8 and the theme is Light.

Since 1999, National Poetry Month has been celebrated each April in Canada, where it is sponsored by the League of Canadian Poets and organized around a different annual theme.

In 1999, UNESCO (the United Nations Educational, Scientific and Cultural Organization) declared March 21 to be World Poetry Day. The purpose of the day is to promote the reading, writing, publishing and teaching of poetry throughout the world and, as the UNESCO session declaring the day says, to "give fresh recognition and impetus to national, regional and international poetry movements."

In the United Kingdom the festival “October is National Poetry Month” was founded in 2000 by Celtic bard Jim MacCool and was adopted by the Birmingham-based Performance Poetry Society that same year. From makeshift beginnings, National Poetry Month has been exploited by primary and secondary schools, colleges of further education, public library services, the prison estate, and to a lesser extent, more localised festivals. Professional poets appear in all corners of the United Kingdom under the aegis of the Performance Poetry Society, which co-ordinates a proportion of their efforts and ensures that they are paid a normal rate for their appearances.

On October 8, 2009, the BBC announced on National Poetry Day the results of its poll to find the nation's favourite poet. The winner was T. S. Eliot, followed by John Donne, Benjamin Zephaniah, Wilfred Owen and Philip Larkin (in that order).

=== United States ===
In 1937 Tessa Sweesy Webb celebrated the first Poetry Day in Ohio on the 3rd Friday of October by proclamation of the Ohio legislature. In 1947 Ralph Cheyney's wife, Lucia Trent, standardized the date of Poetry Day to honor Cheyney on the yearly anniversary of his death. The holiday was first celebrated on October 15, 1947, as Texas Poets Day by proclamation of Governor Beauford H. Jester.

In 1950 Lucia Trent was a member of the National Poetry Day committee led by Dr. Etta Josephean Murfey which sought out an official recognition of the holiday by the president. It expanded first to New York, Idaho, and Pennsylvania in 1948 and by 1955, the National Poetry Day celebration grew to include 42 states. The organization had regional and state representatives.

In 1955 through the advocacy of Philadelphia poet Mary O'Connor, the holiday became World Poetry Day, with Cyprus and the Philippines being first to observe the holiday outside of the United States. By 1960 World Poetry Day was celebrated in 32 countries. O'Connor died in 1960.

In 1966 Dr. Frances Clark Handler of Florida incorporated the World Poetry Day Committee, Inc. as a non-profit to continue to promote the official adoption of the holiday by governments around the world. By the time of Trent's death in 1977, Poetry Day was celebrated in all 50 states and 41 countries. Dr. Handler continued to advocate for presidential recognition of the holiday throughout the 1980s. In 1982 and 1983 Florida Congressman Claude Pepper advocated for Poetry Day on the House floor. She died in 1993.

Due to the advocacy of the Poetry Day Committee, National Poetry Month was widely celebrated across the United States in October beginning in the 1950s. Prior to 1996 October was celebrated as national poetry month by the Academy of American Poets, National League of American Pen Women, National Federation of State Poetry Societies, and the California Federation of Chaparral Poets. In 1959 Academy of American Poets noted that over 100 poetry societies and 200 bookstores across the nation celebrated October as poetry month. Some celebrations in the 1980s and 1990s referred to October as World Poetry Month.
