= George Elliston =

American journalist (1883 – 1946)

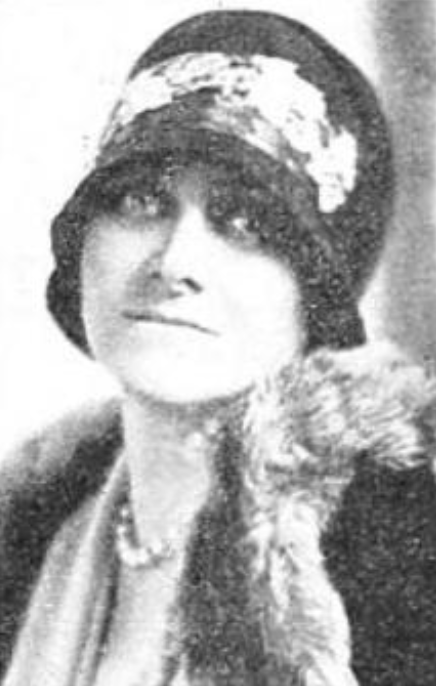
- Elliston, from a 1929 publication
- Born: 1883; Mount Sterling, Kentucky, U.S.
- Died: October 7, 1946 (aged 62–63); Madisonville, Ohio, U.S.
- Occupations: Journalist, poet

George Elliston (1883 - October 7, 1946) was an American journalist and poet.

== Biography ==
George Elliston was born in Mount Sterling, Kentucky. She graduated from Covington High School.

Elliston worked as a reporter for the Cincinnati Times-Star and later as the Society Editor for that newspaper.

She married Augustus Coleman in 1907 and lived briefly with him in St. Louis. She and Coleman separated, and Elliston lived simply and alone in Cincinnati for the remainder of her life.

Upon her death in Madisonville, Cincinnati, Ohio, on October 7, 1946, Elliston bequeathed US$250,000 to the University of Cincinnati to establish a chair "to promote the cause of poetry". The university inaugurated the Elliston Poet-in-Residence Program in 1951. Composer Margaret McClure Stitt set many of Elliston's poems to music.

== Notable Elliston poets ==
- John Ashbery
- Wendell Berry
- John Berryman
- Lynn Emanuel
- Robert Frost
- Alice Fulton
- Louise Glück
- Albert Goldbarth
- Marilyn Hacker
- Donald Hall
- Michael Harper
- Jane Hirshfield
- John Hollander
- Richard Howard
- Randall Jarrell
- Donald Justice
- Carolyn Kizer
- David Lehman
- Denise Levertov
- Philip Levine
- Robert Lowell
- Heather McHugh
- Marilyn Nelson
- Mary Oliver
- Molly Peacock
- David St. John
- Louis Simpson
- Gary Soto
- Gary Snyder
- Stephen Spender
- William Stafford
- Ellen Bryant Voigt
- David Wagoner
- C.D. Wright
- Jay Wright
