= William Sieghart =

British businessman

William Sieghart CBE
- Born: William Matthew Timothy Stephen Sieghart; 1960 (age 65–66)
- Education: St Anne's College, Oxford
- Occupations: Entrepreneur, publisher
- Known for: Founder of the Forward Prizes for Poetry

William Matthew Timothy Stephen Sieghart CBE (born 1960) is a British entrepreneur, publisher and philanthropist and the founder of the Forward Prizes for Poetry. He is former chairman of the Somerset House Trust.

In 1986, he founded Forward Publishing with a business partner Neil Mendoza, an independent contract publisher, publishing magazines, children's books and poetry books. He is the author of The Poetry Pharmacy and The Poetry Pharmacy Returns, as well as various other poetry anthologies and a book on golf, The Swing Factory. Sieghart presented a weekly TV programme for Bloomberg for three years. His interests include foreign travel and cricket. In addition to his work in poetry and the Middle East, Sieghart also founded Big Arts Week and Street Smart, the initiative whereby diners give a percentage of their restaurant bill to the homeless. He was a member of Arts Council England 2000–06, and was chair of its Lottery Panel. From 2015 to 2021, Sieghart was Chair of Somerset House Trust.

== Education ==
Born in 1960, son of barrister Paul Sieghart, a Vienna-born human rights lawyer, and Felicity Ann Sieghart, chair of the National Association for Gifted Children, magistrate and later managing director of the Aldeburgh Cinema, William is the older brother of Mary Ann Sieghart. His father's maternal family had converted to Catholicism from Judaism in the 19th-century. Sieghart was educated at St Anne's College, Oxford.

== Career ==
Sieghart founded Forward Publishing in 1986, with Neil Mendoza, and turned it into one of the largest publishing agencies in the world. Forward published magazines in 131 countries for some of the world's largest corporations. The business was sold to WPP in 2001.

In 1992, Sieghart established The Forward Prizes for Poetry to help raise the profile of contemporary poetry by new and established poets. In 1994, he founded National Poetry Day, a day of celebration of verse on the first Thursday of October, which has become an established fixture in the cultural calendar. Events take place in schools, pubs, arts centres, bookshops, libraries, buses, trains and Women's Institutes, and the day is the focus for media attention for poetry. The Forward Arts Foundation (a registered charity) was established in 1995 to administer the Forward Prizes and National Poetry Day.

His initiative Winning Words was a public art project during the London 2012 Olympic and Paralympic Games. It aimed to enable everyone to experience poetry in exciting ways and to create a legacy of inspiring words for the nation to enjoy. Winning Words comprised both permanent and temporary poems throughout the Park, made up of site-specific poems commissioned from local poets, as well as poems suggested by the public and chosen by a panel. Sieghart chaired and authored An Independent Review of E-Lending in Public Libraries in England published by Department Culture, Media and Sport, 2013 and was subsequently jointly commissioned by DCMS and DCLG to consider and report on Public Library services in England. The "Independent Library report for England" was published by DCMS in December 2014. In September 2015, Sieghart was appointed Chairman of Somerset House Trust.

He is founder and chair of Forward Thinking, a charity that seeks to mediate conflict in the Middle East and to improve relations between the Islamic and Western worlds. He also founded and chairs Streetsmart Action for Homeless, is founding trustee of the Forward Arts Foundation, chair of the CIVIC Libraries initiative and a trustee of the Grenfell Foundation. He served as chair of Somerset House from 2015 to 2021, and has been a trustee of the Esmée Fairbairn Foundation, The Arts Foundation, the RSA and the British Human Rights and Reprieve. He is a former council member of the Arts Council England and was chair of its Lottery Panel. In January 2024 Sieghart became Chair of Trustees of the Henry Smith Charity, a grant-giving charity helping people and communities in the UK.

Sieghart has published many books and is a regular broadcaster. His Poetry Pharmacy trilogy was published between 2017 and 2023 by Penguin, and a children's anthology "Everyone Sang" was published by Walker Books in 2021., and 100 Prized Poems – 25 Years of the Forward Books was published by Forward in association with Faber & Faber in 2016. In September 2019, Vol. II, The Poetry Pharmacy Returns was published in the UK and Vol III The Poetry Remedy published in the US by Penguin Random House in October 2019.

He was appointed Commander of the Order of the British Empire (CBE) in the 2016 New Year Honours for services to public libraries.
