= Rosa Zagnoni Marinoni =

American poet

- Born: Rosa Zagnoni; January 5, 1888; Bologna, Italy
- Died: March 26, 1970 (aged 82); Fayetteville, Arkansas, U.S.
- Resting place: Saint Joseph Cemetery
- Occupation: Poet
- Spouses: Antonio Marinoni (m. 1908–1944); Luigi Passarelli (m. 1946–1953)
- Children: 6
- Writing career
- Language: English

Rosa Zagnoni Marinoni (January 5, 1888 – March 26, 1970) was an American poet. Marinoni had more than 1,000 of her short stories published in 70 magazines and her poems were published in more than 900 U.S. and international publications. Arkansas governor Benjamin Travis Laney named October 15, 1948, the state's first annual Poetry Day due to her efforts. Her home was added to the National Register of Historic Places in 1990.

== Career ==
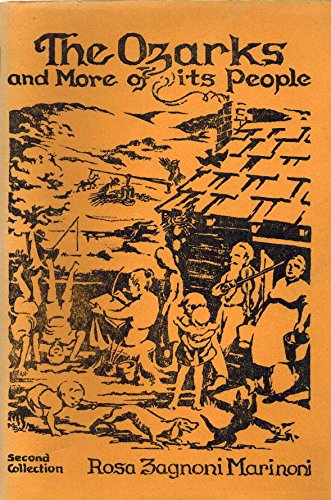
Cover of The Ozarks and More of its People (1961) by Rosa Zagnoni Marinoni, decorations by Marcia Swett Arpin

During the middle of the 1920s, Marinoni wrote poems quickly and her writing was published around 60 times during the beginning of her career. She founded the University-City Poetry Club in 1926 and the club shared their poems at her home for 45 years, leading to around 18 published compilations.

Marinoni founded the Northwest Arkansas chapter of the National League of American Pen Women. In 1928, the Arkansas Federation of Woman's Clubs gave Marinoni the organization's title of poet laureate and in 1953, she was named the state's poet laureate by the Arkansas General Assembly. Due to Marinoni promoting poetry throughout the state, Arkansas governor Benjamin Travis Laney proclaimed October 15, 1948 as the state's first annual Poetry Day. Arkansas governor Winthrop Rockefeller proclaimed October 15 as Rosa Zagnoni Marinoni Day in 1969. Marinoni had more than 1,000 of her short stories published in 70 magazines and her poems were published in more than 900 U.S. and international publications. She also published around 19 books and the titles include Behind the Mask (1927), Roots to the Sky (1956), and a series containing four books. Marinoni stated that "a poet's worth must be gauged by the national or international renown which his or her work enjoys" and that "Arkansas is not known as a poet-producing state".

== Personal life ==
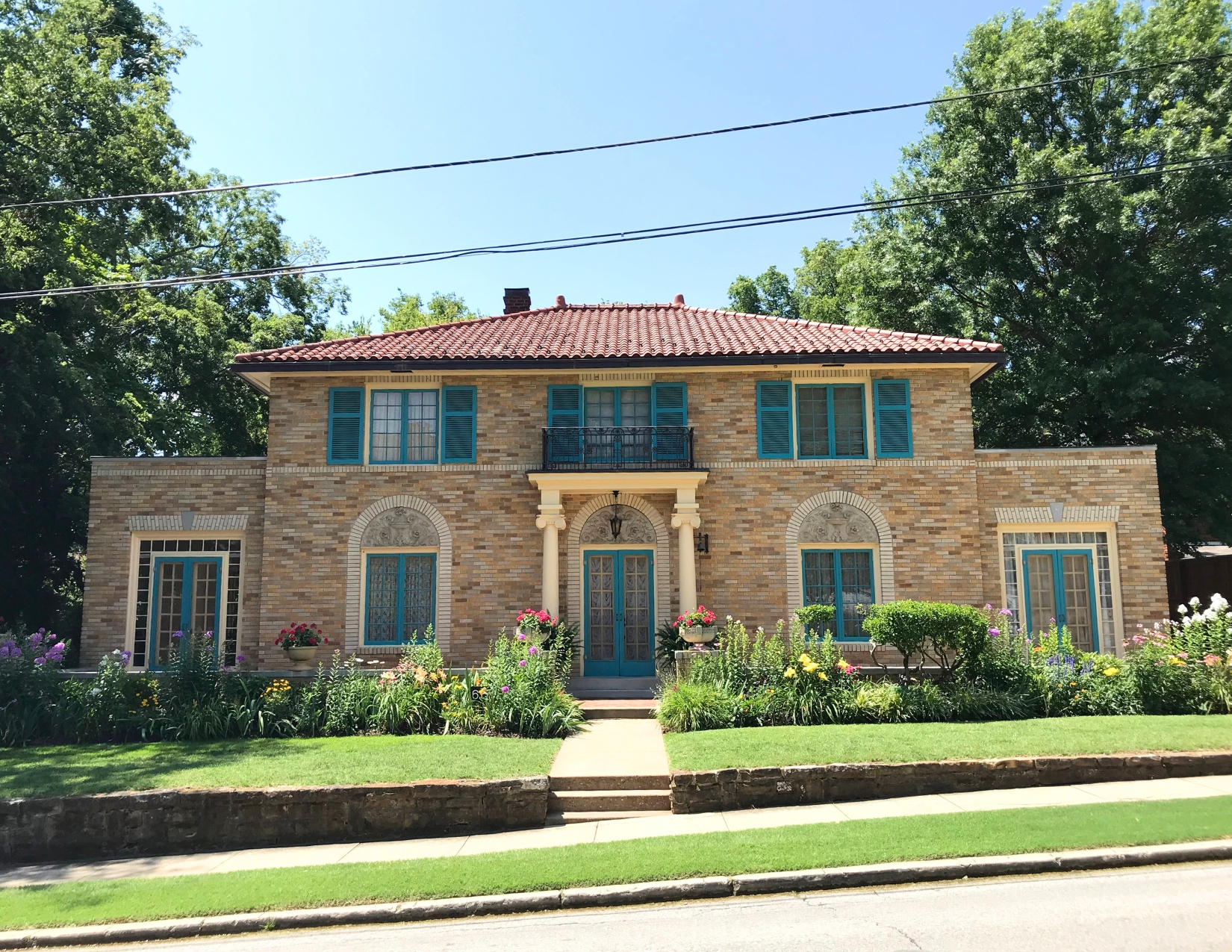
Villa Rosa (Fayetteville, Arkansas)

Marinoni was born in Bologna, Italy, on January 5, 1888, to Antero Zagnoni and Maria Marzocchi. She and her parents immigrated to the United States in 1898 to live in Brooklyn, New York. On July 30, 1908, she married Antonio Marinoni who worked at the University of Arkansas. She moved to Fayetteville, Arkansas, which was where her husband lived. They had six children, with two of them dying in infancy. Marinoni helped the American Red Cross during World War II. After Antonio died in 1944, Marinoni married again in 1946 to a faculty member of the University of Arkansas named Luigi Passarelli. They were married until Passarelli's death in 1953.

Marinoni died on March 26, 1970, and was buried at Saint Joseph Cemetery in Fayetteville. Her home, Villa Rosa, was added to the National Register of Historic Places in 1990.
