= Mabel Posegate =

Mabel Posegate (June 8, 1885 - April 28, 1950) was an American poet and first poet laureate of Ohio from 1936 to 1941.

== Early life ==
Mabel Gertrude Bear was born on June 8, 1885, in Cincinnati, Ohio to Oliver Franklin Bear and Gertrude Knighton. She was educated at Walnut Hills High School, graduating in 1903, Nelson Business College, and University of Cincinnati. She married Charles Sargent Posegate on December 5, 1905 and had four children.

Posegate was a past president of the Cincinnati Eastern Hills Literary Society. She was a member of Hyde Park Literary Society, Cincinnati Women's Press Club, Poetry Society of America, Poetry Society of Ohio, Poetry Society of England, the Society of Writers (England and America), Advisory Committee on Women's Participation in the New York World's Fair in 1939, Greater Cincinnati Writer's League, Omega chapter of Phi Beta, the League to Support Poetry, and the National League of American Pen Women.

== Publications ==
=== Books ===
- Silver Scutcheon Harold Vinal, Ltd. 1928.
- Once When Arcturus Shone Stephen Daye Press. 1935.
- Burning Gold Falmouth. 1947.

=== Anthologies ===
- "Dawn in the Heart" Braithwaite's Anthology of Magazine Verse for 1927 (1927)
- "Mutation" Braithwaite's Anthology of Magazine Verse for 1928 (1928)
- "Stoic" The Grub Street Book of Verse H. Harrison (1928)
- "Welcome, Your Majesties!" Davis Anthology of Newspaper Verse for 1939 H. Harrison (1940)
- Davis Anthology of Newspaper Verse for 1940 H. Harrison (1941)
- Davis Anthology of Newspaper Verse for 1941 H. Harrison (1942)

=== Poems ===
- "By Mabel Posegate" The Kentucky Post December 19, 1924
- "Quiet broods upon the amber air" The Public Ledger September 4, 1925
- "The Companion" The Leaf-Chronicle March 25, 1926
- "The Artificer" The Cambridge City Tribune June 10, 1926
- "The Coat of Arms" The Public Ledger February 17, 1927
- "Life and the Dream" The Leaf-Chronicle March 12, 1929
- "Love Revealed" Poetry Review Vol 21 (1930)
- "What is Poetry? Poetry Review Vol 21 (1930)
- "Power" Troubadour: A Magazine of Verse, Vol. 3, No. 1, June 1930
- "Tranquil Garden" The News-Democrat January 8, 1931
- "To the One who Fought with Washington" Richmond Daily Register March 21, 1931
- "Invocation" The Cincinnati Enquirer October 15, 1931
- "On Lines from Keats" The Daily Independent November 7, 1934
- "No Second Spring" The Greeneville Sun May 3, 1935
- "Old Mansions" The Breckenridge News and the Irvington Herald August 14, 1935
- "Marigolds" The Daily Independent October 7, 1935
- "Inevitable" The Daily Independent March 27, 1936
- "Unvanquished" The Register July 25, 1936
- "Ohio Holds my Heart" The Cincinnati Post January 14, 1937
- "Helen from Hades" The Lexington Herald April 29, 1937
- "Found" The Daily Independent May 15, 1937
- "Incident in a Paper Shade Factory" The Daily Independent May 20, 1937
- "For One who is Long Gone" The Virginian-Pilot October 10, 1937
- "Quest" Glen Innes Examiner April 7, 1938
- "Death" The Central New Jersey Home News June 25, 1938
- "Courage from the Hills" The Public Ledger November 8, 1938
- "Silence in Spring" The Public Ledger March 31, 1939
- "I Shall Return" Pasadena Star-News May 13, 1939
- "Babylon" Lexington Herald-Leader September 21, 1939
- "Monologue for Autumn" The Free Lance-Star October 7, 1939
- "These Open Hills" The Public Ledger October 26, 1939
- "Spoken: They Soar" The Public Ledger July 31, 1940
- "Miniature against the Sun" The Public Ledger August 1, 1940
- "For a Diary during August" The Public Ledger August 28, 1940
- "August" The Moncton Transcript August 30, 1940
- "When Wild Geese Fly" The Public Ledger October 9, 1940
- "Curse of Being Awake" The Sentinel Democrat November 14, 1940
- "Crib in Lytle Park" The Cincinnati Enquirer December 28, 1940
- "Early Miracle" The Morning Call March 27, 1941
- "Glamorous Friend" The Public Ledger July 18, 1941
- "If He must Leave the Heights" The Public Ledger August 13, 1941
- "Garden in September" The Public Ledger September 11, 1941
- "We do not Forget" The Public Ledger November 15, 1941
- "First Winter" The Public Ledger February 28, 1942
- "I Know these Things" The Falmouth Outlook March 20, 1942
- "Serenity still Lies with Thee" The Public Ledger June 19, 1942
- "Never Too Much" The Public Ledger September 5, 1942
- "Halloween Rite" Evening Star October 31, 1942
- "The Christmas Star" The Public Ledger December 24, 1942
- "Proud Epitaph: Killed on Active Service" Evening Star January 18, 1943
- "To John Keats" The Cincinnati Enquirer May 10, 1943
- "Across the Years" The Public Ledger February 22, 1944
- "Somewhere the Tree of Life is Blooming" The Cincinnati Enquirer July 24, 1944
- "To Miss Tessa Kavanaugh" The Tryon Daily Bulletin December 5, 1944
- "A Grandson is Growing Up" The Shreveport Journal October 22, 1945
- "March" The Public Ledger March 5, 1946
- "Aftermath of Air Missions" Birmingham Post-Herald March 28, 1946
- "Spring is a Pair of Bright Red Shoes" The Cincinnati Enquirer May 13, 1946
- "Boy" The Lewiston Daily Sun May 30, 1946
- "Blessings in Summer Rain" The Cincinnati Enquirer July 22, 1946
- "Color of an Autumn Afternoon" The Cincinnati Enquirer November 11, 1946
- "Robert Herrick" The Cincinnati Enquirer March 3, 1947
- "Cardinals in March" The Public Ledger March 22, 1947
- "Ritual for May Days" The Public Ledger May 3, 1947
- "Birdcage Dream" The Cincinnati Enquirer July 21, 1947
- "The Moongate was a Great White Way" The Cincinnati Enquirer September 29, 1947
- "Birds in Cold" The Public Ledger Feb 4, 1948
- "Song Off Key" The Cincinnati Enquirer Apr 12, 1948
- "I shall Remember You" The Cincinnati Enquirer August 30, 1948
- "Feel of Autumn" The Cincinnati Enquirer Dec 6, 1948
- "Bronze Clock with Lady" The Cincinnati Enquirer January 31, 1949
- "Washington" The Public Ledger February 22, 1949
- "Thoughts at Easter" The Cincinnati Enquirer April 11, 1949
- "Turtle" The Morning Press April 21, 1949
- "Burning Gold" The Morning Press April 22, 1949
- "Beethoven to the Countess of Brunswick" The Morning Press April 26, 1949
- "Adam was Happier than We" Battle Creek Enquirer December 9, 1949
- "Artiste’s Perspective" The Public Ledger April 22, 1950
- "Milady ironing handkerchiefs" The Cincinnati Enquirer April 24, 1950
