= William Peterfield Trent =

American journalist (1862–1939)

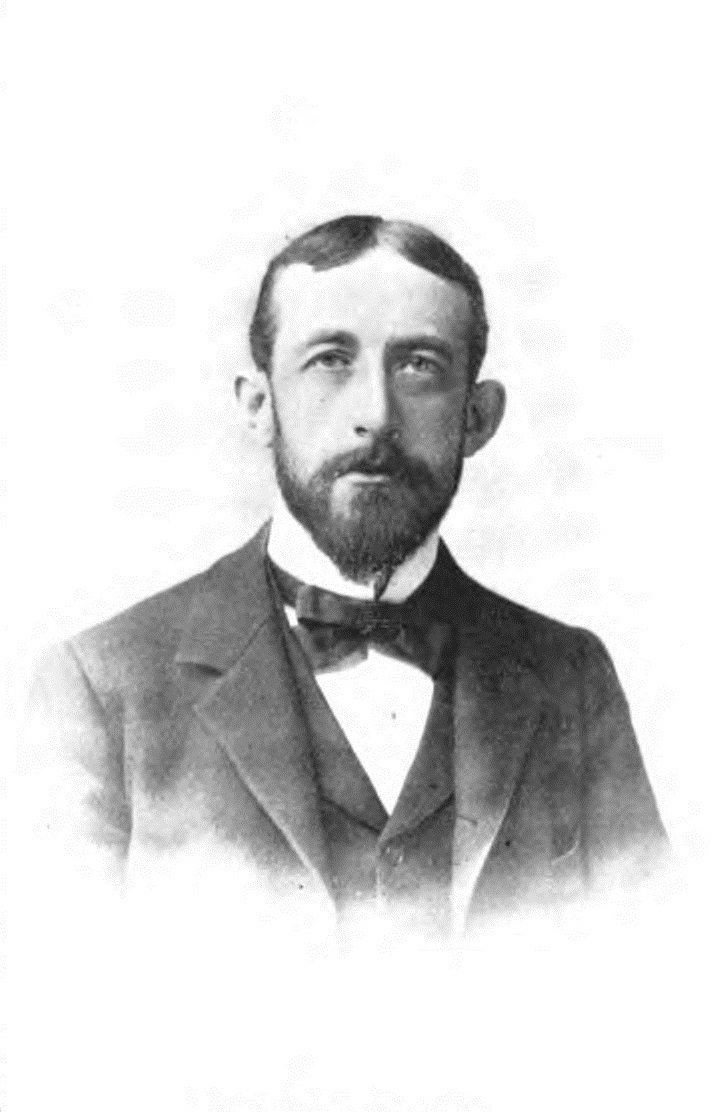
- Born: 10 November 1862; Richmond, Virginia, C.S.
- Died: December 7, 1939 (aged 77); Hopewell Junction, New York, U.S.
- Education: University of Virginia
- Occupation: Academic
- Spouse: Alice Lyman
- Children: 1 son, 1 daughter

William Peterfield Trent, LL.D., D.C.L. (10 November 1862 – 7 December 1939) was an American academic and the author/editor of many books. He was a professor of English literature at Sewanee: The University of the South and Columbia University. While at Sewanee, he founded the Sewanee Review in 1892, a literary journal that continues to operate.

== Early life ==
Trent was born in Richmond, Virginia. His grandfather, Joseph Trent, had an M.D. degree from the University of Pennsylvania. His father, Peterfield Trent, also became a doctor and served as a surgeon for the Confederate States Army during the war. His mother, née Lucy Carter Burwell, came from a long line of Virginians.

Trent was first educated at Thomas Norwood's University School. In 1880 he began studying at the University of Virginia, where his fellow students included Woodrow Wilson and Oscar W. Underwood. Here he became the editor of the Virginia University Magazine before graduation. He left with a Master of Arts. In 1887 he began studying at Johns Hopkins University. He was a member of the Seminary of Historical Political Science, which was directed by Herbert B. Adams. It was rare for a student to read more than one report per academic year for the Seminary, but Trent read three.

== Career ==
While still at university, Trent accepted an offer to teach at Sewanee: The University of the South. He served as professor of English and the acting professor of history in Sewanee, Tennessee, from 1888 until 1900, and from 1893 was dean of the academic department. While there, he founded (1892) and edited The Sewanee Review. He also created the Sewannee Historical Society at the University of the South. He was a speaker at the Vanderbilt Southern History Society at Nashville. Both groups were developed to build a stronger collection of history documents and books in the South.

In 1900, Trent became professor of English literature at Columbia University, in New York City. There he turned his attention to the study of Daniel Defoe and to English history and literature of the 1680 to 1730 period. He edited Robinson Crusoe and wrote a biography and bibliography of Defoe in ten volumes (in manuscript to 1916). He collaborated in numerous literary undertakings, for example Colonial Prose and Poetry, editions of Shakespeare and Thackeray and the Cambridge History of American Literature.

== Personal life and death ==
In 1896 William P. Trent married Alice Lyman. They had two children, Lucia Trent and William P. Trent Jr. He resided in Hopewell Junction, New York.

Trent died on December 7, 1939, in Hopewell Junction.

== Works ==
Edgar Allan Poe - A Centenary Tribute (William P. Trent, Oliver Huckel, John Prentiss Poe, Lizette Woodworth Reese and Mrs. John C. Wrenshall), 1910

- English Culture in Virginia (1889)
- William Gilmore Simms (1892)
- Southern Statesmen of the Old Régime (1897)
- The Authority of Criticism (1899)
- Robert E. Lee (1899)
- John Milton (1899)
- War and Civilization (1901)
- Progress of the United States during the Nineteenth Century (1901)
- A History of American Literature 1807-1865 (1903)
- A Brief History of American Literature (1904)
- Greatness in Literature, and Literary Addresses (1905)
- Longfellow and Other Essays (1910)
- Great American Writers (with John Erskine) (1912)
- Defoe — How to Know Him (1916)
- A New South View of Reconstruction

Edited works:

- Select Poems of Milton (1895)
- Essays of Macaulay (1897)
- Poems and Tales of Edgar Allan Poe (1898)
- Balzac's Comédie Humaine, school text (1900)
- Colonial Prose and Poetry, school text (with B. W. Wells, 3 vols., 1901)
- Southern Writers, Selections in Prose and Verse (1905)
