= Pythian Sisters =

American and Canadian fraternal order

The Pythian Sisters is a fraternal order with members throughout the United States and Canada. Although affiliated with the Knights of Pythias, they are not an auxiliary group as they have their own charter. The Pythian Sisters provided sick and death benefits to members.

== History ==
The origin of the Pythian auxiliaries for women is two-fold. In 1888, the Supreme Lodge of the Knights of Pythias approved the creation of a female auxiliary with a ritual written by Joseph Addison Hill. However, there were other women who favored a ritual written by Mrs. Alva A. Young. Two organizations were organized: the Pythian Sisterhood, using Young's ritual in Concord, New Hampshire on February 22, 1888 and the Pythian Sisters of the World, that same year, in Warsaw, Indiana using Hill's ritual. In addition to the differences in ritual, the Concord group did not accept (male) members of the Knights of Pythias as members, whereas the Warsaw group did. In 1894 the Supreme Lodge ruled that its members could not belong to another organization with "Pythian" in its title, so the Warsaw group changed its name to the Rathbone Sisters of the World, in order to keep its male members. In 1906, the Supreme Lodge repealed that prohibition and the two auxiliaries merged into a new order simply known as the Pythian Sisters.

== Organization ==
Local units are known as "Temples," state units are called "Grand Temples" and the national structure is called the "Supreme Temple," which meets biennially with the Supreme Lodge of the Knights of Pythias. In 1979 the Sisterhood did not have a regular headquarters, but the Supreme Temple offices were located in whatever city the Supreme Secretary happened to reside, which that year was in Lonaconing, Pennsylvania.

=== Pythian Sunshine Girls ===
The Pythian Sisters have a youth affiliate, the Pythian Sunshine Girls, started in 1930. It is open to girls 8–20 and has local Councils in Arizona, New Mexico, California, Ohio, Virginia and Texas, with some interest expressed in creating Councils in Kentucky and Michigan. Denise Friend of Albuquerque, New Mexico is the current Supreme Royal Princess, the head of the organization. Lynette Burnam was the Grand Royal Princess in Arizona in 1968-1969.

== Membership ==
In 1964 the qualifications for membership included being over 16 years of age, of good moral character, able to speak the English language and be the wife, widow, sister, half-sister, sister-in-law, mother, stepmother or mother-in-law of a member of the Knights of Pythias. Historically, the organization was open to only white women. Male members who had taken any of the Degrees of the Order were also eligible. Today the membership requirements are only that the candidate be over sixteen, speak English and believe in a Supreme Being.

== See also ==
- Order of the Eastern Star
