= E. Merrill Root =

American writer

Edward Merrill Root
- Born: January 4, 1895; Baltimore, Maryland, US
- Died: October 26, 1973 (aged 78); Kennebunkport, Maine
- Education: Amherst College; Andover Theological Seminary
- Occupations: Educator and poet
- Known for: Anti-communist activities; Conservative education activism
- Spouse(s): Alsa Verna Voorhees (maiden; 1889–1969) → widow of Orin Melvin Landon (1889–1918) Dorothy Jewel MacNab (maiden; 1919–2012) m. 1969

Edward Merrill Root (January 4, 1895 – October 26, 1973) was an American educator and poet devoted to anti-communist causes.

== Biography ==
Root was born in Baltimore, Maryland, the son of a Congregationalist Church minister. In 1917, he graduated from Amherst College in Amherst, Massachusetts, where he studied under Robert Frost.

Root was a conscientious objector during World War I. He went to France with the American Friends Service Committee, saw action as an ambulance driver and returned to the United States to study at Andover Theological Seminary, the University of Missouri, and Harvard.

In 1920, he began working at Earlham College in Richmond, Indiana, as a professor of English literature, where his tenure lasted until his retirement in 1960. While working at Earlham, Root, who had been a devout Quaker and pacifist, emerged as a conservative advocate.

In 1952, Root wrote "Darkness at Noon in American Colleges", an article warning parents of the "polio of collectivism" at American colleges and universities. He then wrote the book Collectivism on the Campus, alleging communism was widespread at colleges, and a few years later, Brainwashing in the High Schools: An Examination of Eleven American History Textbooks. The latter book brought Root fame in conservative circles.

Root became a member of the Textbook Evaluation Committee of Operation Textbook, sponsored by America's Future under the direction of Lucille Cardin Crain. (Note: Lucille Cardin Crain (née Marie Lucille Gabrielle Cardin; 1901–1983) was an arch-conservative activist who, in 1949, founded the Educational Reviewer. Crain's primary interest was in – as she stated in 1951 – "rooting out radical influences in American education." In each issue, other arch-conservative academicians and writers offered their views of high school and college textbooks as evidence of collectivist content and the like. The publication, for the first three years, was chiefly financed by William F. Buckley, Jr. Crain's husband, Kenneth Cardwell Crain (1883–1969), was a brother of Gustavus Demetrious Crain, Jr. (1885–1973), founder of Crain Communications.) The committee adopted DAR resolutions "as a yard-stick" to ascertain a textbook's acceptability. Any book failing to present the American Republic and U.S. Constitution in a favorable light received negative reviews.

Other members of the Textbook Evaluation Committee, in 1959, were:

- Neil Carothers, PhD (1884–1965)
- Medford Stanton Evans, PhD (1934–2015)
- Albert Hoyt Hobbs, PhD (1910–1994)
- Willmoore Kendall, PhD (1909–1967)
- Russell Kirk (1918–1994), MA, D. Litt.
- Ella Lonn (1979–1962), PhD
- Marie Regina Madden, PhD (1887–1973)
- J.B. Matthews (1894–1966)
- William Montgomery McGovern, PhD (1897–1964)
- Felix Morley, PhD (1894–1982)
- Charles Callan Tansill, PhD (1890–1964)

Root was one of the founders and original contributors to National Review, famously squaring off against Whittaker Chambers in reviews of novels by Ayn Rand in which Root defended her as a brilliantly gifted artist against Chambers' complaint that as a militant atheist she should be driven from the nascent conservative movement. In retirement, Root withdrew from the masthead of National Review and became an editor of the monthly American Opinion magazine of the John Birch Society, as well as continuing his editorial relationship with The American Friend, The Measure, and Quaker Life. His book America's Steadfast Dream, published in 1971, is an anthology of twenty-five essays that appeared in American Opinion over a period of a decade.

Root published 11 books of poetry, which were praised; his former teacher, Robert Frost, called Root "the second best poet in America". He also wrote a biography of Frank Harris.

Root's central philosophy was what he called "Essentialism". His intention was " ... to make coherent and affirmative a certain philosophy, and American philosophy, and to do so in terms of art." He stated his philosophy thus:

"More and more as my life has matured, I have realized that by fundamental nature I am a conservative. I have realized that I wish to preserve the roots of life whence grow the blossoms and the fruits of life, and that I have become a genuine radical - i.e., one who works with the roots of life, laboring to set them more firmly and to nourish them more richly. I applaud fruitful change that comes from an enhancement and intensification of the last things that maintain their continuity with first things. But, as I see it, such change must be growth from within, so that you and I and our nation become ever more clearly, more richly, more truly, what we always are, potentially in principle. Man is ever seeking novelty; God is forever and ever making things new. He does not make the seasons, nor the rose, nor the Labrador retriever, nor the lover nor the poet, novel - He makes them new. And because they are new in their fundamental being, they are vitally old; as tomorrow's sunrise will be the newest of dawns and the oldest of dawns, since it shone upon the Birthday of Creation."

For the individual, Root stated his philosophy as a person's "outermost expression of his innermost essence ... Man, being finite in existence, but infinite in essence, succeeds by reaching his highest point of failure."

He died at age 78 in 1973 in a Portland, Maine, hospital.

== Selected work ==
=== Prose ===
- "The Culture of Abundance" (1938)
- Brainwashing in the High Schools (1958)
- Collectivism on the Campus
- America's Steadfast Dream
- Frank Harris: A Biography
- The Way of All Spirit

=== Poetry ===
- Lost Eden
- Bow of Burning Gold
- Dawn is Forever
- Before the Swallow Dares
- The Seeds of Time
- Ulysses To Penelope
- Out Of Our Winter
- The Light Wind Over
- Shoulder the Sky
- Of Perilous Seas
- Like White Birds Flying
- Children of the Morning

== See also ==
- Technocracy
- First New Right (United States)

== Bibliography ==
=== References ===
- Cornog, William Hafner, PhD (1909–2002) (November 23, 1958). "A Look at the Text". New York Times Book Review, The (review of Root's book, Brainwashing in the High Schools). Section 7. Vol. 108, no. 36828 (Late City ed.). p. 20 – via TimesMachine.
- "E. Merrill Root papers, 1917–1967" (archival collection). University of Oregon. OCLC 67840452 – via Archives West, Orbis Cascade Alliance, maintained by Washington State University.
- Johnson, Kevin Boland (May 2014). "Guardians of Historical Knowledge: Textbook Politics, Conservative Activism, and School Reform in Mississippi, 1928–1982" (PDF) (PhD dissertation, Department of History). Starkville: Mississippi State University. p. 152. OCLC 883609902.
- Operation Textbook (pamphlet). America's Future, Inc. 1959 – via Internet Archive.
- Thornton, James, Fr. (June 13, 1994). "The Legacy of E. Merrill Root". Appleton, Wisconsin: The John Birch Society. Archived from the original on November 25, 2007 – via Wayback Machine.

=== References by Root ===
- Root, E. Merrill (April 1938). "The Culture of Abundance". Technocracy: 19–28 – via Internet Archive. OCLC 11846652 (publication); OCLC 9426480 (article).
- Root, E. Merrill (July 30, 1952). Frank Chodorov → associate (ed.). "Darkness at Noon in American Colleges". Human Events (newsletter). Vol. 9, no. 31. Washington, D.C. pp. 1–4. ISSN 0018-7194 (publication); OCLC 605089107 (all editions) (publication).
- Root, E. Merrill (1959) [1958]. Brainwashing In the High Schools – An Examination of Eleven American History Textbooks. New York: The Devin-Adair Company – via Internet Archive LCCN 57-13356.
The author dedicated the book to his four grandchildren:
Two by way of his stepson, Melvin Voorhees Landon (1916–1981), from Root's wife's first marriage
1. Joyce Merrill Landon (1941–2010), who, in 1965, married Enayetur Rahim (1938–2003)
2. Frank Voorhees Landon (born 1943)
Two by way of his daughter Georgiana Merrill Root (1927–2010), who, in 1951, married Lawrence Harvey O'Kane (1922–2008)
3. Leslie
4. Stephen Hugh O'Kane (1957–1969)
