= Isadora Newman =

American poet

Isadora Newman (April 23, 1878 – 1955) was an American artist, poet, writer, playwright and storyteller. She was born and raised in New Orleans and her work reflected the influences of her youth, particularly the African American and Creole culture of New Orleans.

== Early history ==
Born Miriam Dorothy Newman, Newman was the daughter of Rebecca (Kiefer) and Isidore Newman, a New Orleans banker and businessman who later became known for his philanthropy. The Isidore Newman School in New Orleans was named for him in 1913. He was active in the New Orleans Jewish community, where he was also a founding member of B'nai B'rith. Miriam Newman was educated largely by governesses. She married Edwin A. Neugass at age 23. They moved to New York, where Neugass had a seat in the Stock Exchange. The couple had three children: Bessie, James, and Edwin. She was primarily a homemaker during this time. With the children grown, Newman enrolled in classes at Columbia University. After Neugass died in October 1921, she began her career as an artist.

== Career ==
Newman began telling stories and folk tales at the University Settlement in New York City and local schools. She published her first collection, Fairy Flowers, in 1926, under the name Isadora Newman, which became her pen name. The book was praised both in the U.S. and in translation abroad, and was followed by a poetry collection, Shades of Blue, in 1927, two books of folk tales in German in 1930, and a play, Granny’s Garden, first produced in 1931. She painted, primarily watercolors, and studied sculpture in France. She received a degree from La Horde Society. Her work was regularly exhibited at galleries in New York, Louisiana, as well as in European galleries. Apart from her artistic endeavors, Newman was recognized for her philanthropy. In 1926, the Serbian government recognized her efforts on behalf of war orphans.
