= Kate Slaughter McKinney =

American poet

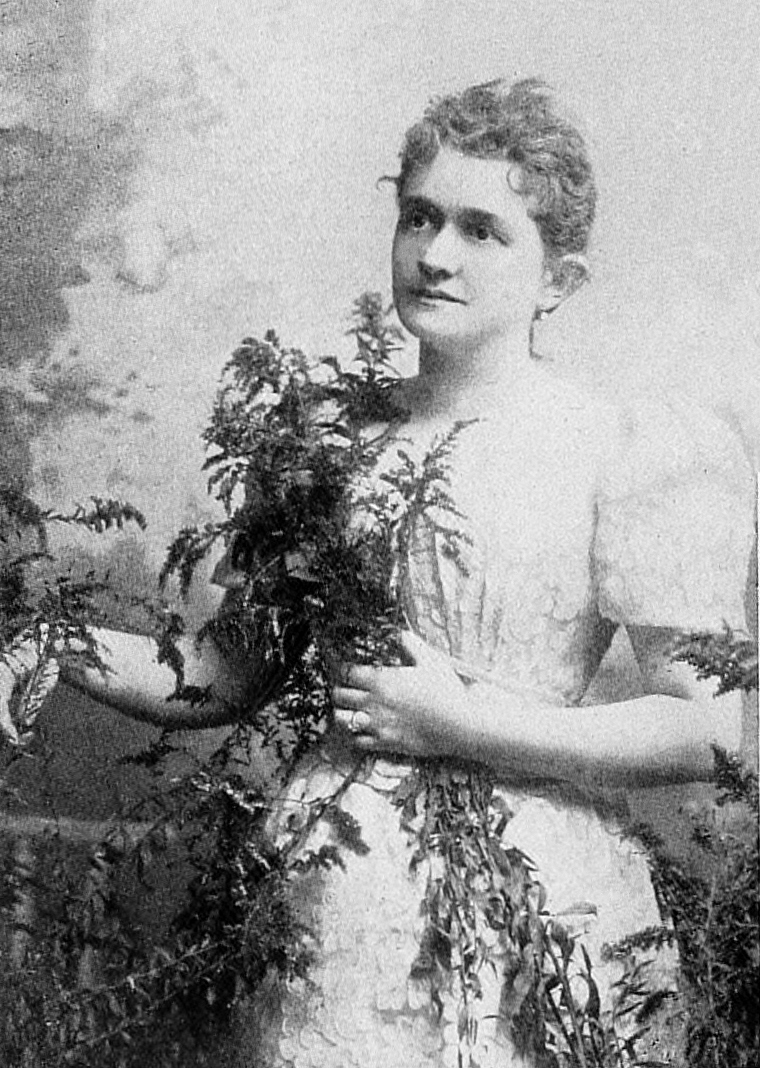
Kate Slaughter McKinney

Kate Slaughter McKinney (February 6, 1859 – March 2, 1939) was a writer and poet who used the pen-name of Katydid. In 1931, she was elected Poet Laureate of the State of Alabama.

== Early life ==
Kate Slaughter was born in London, Kentucky, on February 6, 1859, the daughter of James Love Slaughter and Lucinda Jane Price. Her father was born in Booneville, Kentucky, and later moved to London and Richmond, Kentucky. From her father's side she was the great-granddaughter of Gov. Gabriel Slaughter and from her mother side she was the great-granddaughter of Gov. James Garrard. Her great-uncle was Gen. Theo Garrard.

She first attended schools in Kirksville, Kentucky, and then graduated in 1876 from the Daughters' College, Harrodsburg, Kentucky.

== Career ==
Kate Slaughter McKinney wrote verses since she was fifteen years of age. The first were published in The Courier-Journal, from which they found a way into the leading newspapers and magazines.

Dream I not of fame or fortune,
Only this I inward crave,
Sweet assurance,
Long endurance,
Of a love beyond the grave.
Should my songs die out and perish,
You'll my name repeat and cherish;
Though all trace is lost of me,
Still you'll call from tree to tree.

— From the "To A Katydid" poem by Kate Slaughter McKinney

McKinney got her inspiration from the trees and the flowers and the brooks. Her Kentucky home stood out with frequency in the pages of her published volume, Katydid's Poems (1887). Her other books are: Palace of Silver (1927), The Silent Witness, a Tale of a Kentucky Tragedy (1906), The Weed by the Wall (1911).

She had a lyric gift, and her poems had melody and sweetness.

In 1931 she was elected Poet Laureate of the State of Alabama.

== Personal life ==
On May 7, 1878, she became the wife of James Isaac McKinney, the superintendent of the L. & N. R. R. in Montgomery, Alabama.

She died in Montgomery on March 2, 1939, and is buried at Buffalo Springs Cemetery, Stanford, Kentucky.
