= National Poetry Day (United States) =

Observance on 15 October

- Observances: Promote poetry
- Begins: 1947
- Date: 15 October
- Next time: 15 October 2026
- Frequency: Annual
- First time: 1947; 79 years ago

The first Poetry Day in the United States was observed in Ohio in October 1937. Tessa Sweesy Webb celebrated the first Poetry Day in Ohio on the 3rd Friday of October by proclamation of the Ohio legislature. In 1947 Lucia Trent standardized the date to October 15 to honor her husband, Ralph Cheyney. The holiday was first celebrated on October 15, 1947, as Texas Poets Day by proclamation of Governor Beauford H. Jester.

Despite the adoption of UNESCO's World Poetry Day in March and the Academy of American Poets declaring April to be National Poetry Month in the late 1990s, the holiday is still observed in the 21st Century on October 15 by many states and poetry clubs affiliated with the National Federation of State Poetry Societies.

== History of the holiday ==
=== National Poetry Day Committee ===
In 1950 Lucia Trent was a member of the National Poetry Day committee led by Dr. Etta Josephean Murfey which sought out an official recognition of the holiday by the president. It expanded first to New York, Idaho, and Pennsylvania in 1948 and by 1955, the National Poetry Day celebration grew to include 42 states. The organization had regional and state representatives.

=== World Poetry Day ===
In 1955 through the advocacy of Philadelphia poet Mary O'Connor, the holiday became World Poetry Day, with Cyprus and the Philippines being first to observe the holiday outside of the United States. By 1960 World Poetry Day was celebrated in 32 countries. O'Connor died in 1960.

In 1966 Dr. Frances Clark Handler of Florida incorporated the World Poetry Day Committee, Inc. as a non-profit to continue to promote the official adoption of the holiday by governments around the world. By the time of Trent's death in 1977, Poetry Day was celebrated in all 50 states and 41 countries. Dr. Handler continued to advocate for presidential recognition of the holiday throughout the 1980s. In 1982 and 1983 Florida Congressman Claude Pepper advocated for Poetry Day on the House floor. She passed away in 1993.

=== Poetry Month ===
Due to the advocacy of the Poetry Day Committee, National Poetry Month was widely celebrated across the United States in October beginning in the 1950s. Prior to 1996 October was celebrated as national poetry month by the Academy of American Poets, National League of American Pen Women, National Federation of State Poetry Societies, and the California Federation of Chaparral Poets. In 1959 Academy of American Poets noted that over 100 poetry societies and 200 bookstores across the nation celebrated October as poetry month. Some celebrations in the 1980s and 1990s referred to October as World Poetry Month.

== See also ==
- National Poetry Day, held in October in the United Kingdom
- National Poetry Month, held in April in the United States and Canada
- Honorary Poets, chosen on 1 November, Poetry Day in the Korea
