= Margaret E. Haughawout =

American writer

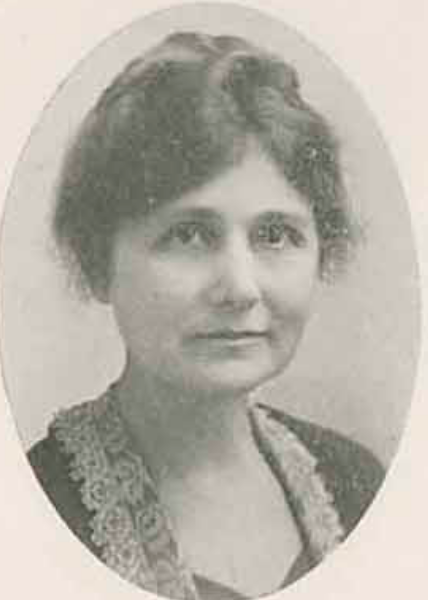
- Haughawout, from a 1926 yearbook
- Born: September 21, 1874; Fairmont, Nebraska, U.S.
- Died: December 28, 1964 (aged 90); Pittsburg, Kansas, U.S.
- Occupations: Writer, college professor

Margaret Elizabeth Haughawout (September 21, 1874 – December 28, 1964) was an American writer and college professor. She taught at Kansas State Teachers College in Pittsburg from 1923 to 1934, and had poetry published in The Crisis and Prairie Schooner. She was also dean of women at Alma College in Michigan, and was an elected county superintendent of schools in Nebraska from 1919 to 1923.

== Early life and education ==
Haughawout was born in Fairmont, Nebraska, one of the six children of Joseph Henderson Haughawout and Emma Steininger Haughawout. Both of her parents were born in Pennsylvania. She graduated from Hastings College in 1900, and earned a master's degree in English from the University of Nebraska in 1903. Her master's thesis was titled "The Dream in Chaucer."

== Career ==
Haughawout taught English at Hastings Academy and Hastings College from 1902 to 1906. From 1906 to 1911 she was a professor of English and dean of women at Alma College in Michigan. She taught at the Knox School for Girls in New York from 1911 to 1919. From 1919 to 1923, she held elected office, as superintendent of schools for Fillmore County, Nebraska. As superintendent, she was called upon to defend a redistricting map in detail. She started a citizenship class in Geneva, Nebraska, to help immigrants prepare for naturalization.

From 1923 to 1934 Haughawout was a professor of English at Kansas State Teachers College. From 1934 to 1945, she supported herself with writing and gardening. She returned to the classroom from 1945 to 1951. Mary Jugg Molek was one of her students.

Haughawout also led writing groups in Pittsburg, Kansas, wrote songs, and edited college literary publications. She served on the board of directors of the University of Nebraska's alumni association.

== Publications ==
- "A Recent Development" (1925, article)
- Sheep's Clothing (1929, poetry collection)
- "Silk and Stones" (1929, poem, The Grub Street Book of Verse)
- "Unmasked" and "Portrait" (1930, poems, The Crisis)
- "Serf" and "Relict" (1930, poems, Prairie Schooner)
- "Hattie in Greenwich Village" (1931, poem, Prairie Schooner)
- "Household" (1931, poem, The Frontier)
- Pittsburg College Verse, 1924-1930 (1931, editor)

== Personal life and legacy ==
Haughawout was considered an unconventional woman, who assigned modern and controversial texts; her 1926 campus appearance in a menswear suit was still recounted in the local newspaper fifty years later. For two months in 1944, she lived in New Jersey to care for her dying brother. died in 1964, at the age of 90. Her papers are at Pittsburg State University in Kansas. In 1969, a room at Porter Library on campus was named in her memory. She was one of the authors profiled in Nebraska Public Media's Lost Writers of the Plains project in 2015. Work by Haughawout was included in Nebraska Poetry: A Sesquicentennial Anthology, 1867–2017.
