= Lucia Trent (poet) =

American poet (1897–1977)

Lucia Trent (December 19, 1897 – January 27, 1977) was an American poet. She founded National Poetry Day in 1947 in remembrance of her husband Ralph Cheyney. The holiday was celebrated on October 15 in the 20th century. By the time of Trent's death in 1977, Poetry Day was celebrated in all 50 states and 41 countries.

== Early life ==
Lucia Trent was born in Richmond, Virginia on December 19, 1897, the daughter of Alice Lyman and William Peterfield Trent, a Columbia University English professor. Her family is descended from Dudley Digges (patriot) through his daughter, Judith Wormeley Digges. On January 22, 1927 she married Edward Ralph Cheyney, son of Edward Potts Cheyney, a history professor at the University of Pennsylvania, and Gertrude Squires Cheyney. The couple met in New York while Cheyney was involved in the Greenwich Village poetry scene. They had three children, Alice, Trent, and Ralph. Cheyney and Trent taught at Pasadena Junior College. Cheyney was fired in 1940 for his activism with the American Peace Crusade, an organization that opposed the military draft. Lucia Trent resigned in solidarity with her husband. Following Cheyney's death, she remarried in 1942 to Ernest Hamilton Smith Glass, founder of the Texas Council for the Promotion of Poetry.

== Poetry ==
Lucia Trent's poetry was published in over 100 anthologies. She was president of the Western Poets Congress, lifetime member of the Poetry Society of Texas and Austin Poetry Society, vice president of the American Poetry League, and a member of the Poetry Society of America. She was honorary chairman of the Texas Council for the Promotion of Poetry. She was also a member of the Composers, Authors, and Artists of America who awarded her with first prize for her poem "Young Widow." In 1965 she won a trophy honoring her for supporting the cause of poetry by the South and West literary association.

In 1928 Cheyney and Trent published America Arraigned! as a memorial to Sacco and Vanzetti who were executed on August 23, 1927. It included contributions by poets across the political spectrum who opposed their execution, including Vincent Godfrey Burns, Benjamin Musser, Louis Ginsberg, and Edna St. Vincent Millay.

Cheyney and Trent operated a poetry writing correspondence course, the Cheyney-Trent Course in Poetry Technique, publishing four anthologies of student poetry between 1930 and 1932, entitled Pilgrims to Parnassus, Spring Choral, Voices in the Dawn and Early Harvest.

In 1936 Cheyney and Trent founded the Western Poets Congress, which held its first meetings at the Wistaria Festival in Sierra Madre, California. The sixth and final Western Poets Congress was held in San Antonio, Texas in October 1941 with an estimated 600 attendees.

Trent served as advisory chairman of the National Poetry Day Committee. In 1937 Tessa Sweesy Webb celebrated the first Poetry Day in Ohio on the 3rd Friday of October by proclamation of the Ohio legislature. In 1947 Lucia Trent standardized the date of Poetry Day to honor Ralph Cheyney on the yearly anniversary of his passing, October 15. The holiday was first celebrated on October 15, 1947, as Texas Poets Day by proclamation of Governor Beauford H. Jester. By the time of Trent's death in 1977, Poetry Day was celebrated in all 50 states and 41 countries.

== Works ==
=== Poems ===
- "State Cops," St. Louis Star and Times, October 22, 1923.
- "The Motor Muse," The Sacramento Bee, December 15, 1923.
- "I Had a Lover in a Summer Wood," Bozart, September-October 1927.
- "Flag of Light," The Daily Worker, March 13, 1941
- "Poet of the People," honoring Ralph Cheyney, Daily World, February 1, 1942.
- "To Gabriel Peri," Daily World, March 15, 1942.
- "A True Peace" with Ralph Cheyney, St. Cloud Times, May 25, 1942.
- "A Cry for Brotherhood," St. Cloud Times, May 25, 1942.
- "The Red Cross Flag," The Stockman's Journal, April 1, 1944.
- "Act Before it Grows too Late," New Pittsburgh Courier, July 8, 1950.
- "Peace and Bread," The Register Guard, July 15, 1950.
- "Cycles of Dream," Southern Illinoisan, February 8, 1952.
- "Mine Cave In," New Pittsburgh Courier, November 22, 1952.
- "Machinery of Peace," New Pittsburgh Courier, January 10, 1953.
- "Impatient Man," Clarion-Ledger, July 10, 1960.
- "African Tragedy," New Pittsburgh Courier, February 11, 1961.
- "Bread of Brotherhood," Star-Herald, January 13, 1963.
- "Unfinished Business," The Texas Observer, December 27, 1963.
- "Upholders of the Status Quo," New Pittsburgh Courier, January 11, 1964.
- "Prayer for Dangerous Times," The Plainsman, May 20, 1965.
- "Mission to the Moon," The Times, January 26, 1966.

=== Poetry collections ===
- Dawn Stars H. Harrison, New York, 1926.
- Children of Fire & Shadow Robert Packard & Company, Chicago, 1929.
- Cheyney, Ralph, and Trent, Lucia, Dreamers' House Robert Packard & Company, Chicago, 1931.
- Cheyney, Ralph, and Trent, Lucia, Sierra Dreamers' House Poetry Publishers, Philadelphia, 1935.
- Cheyney, Ralph, and Trent, Lucia, Thank You, America! Suttonhouse, Los Angeles, 1937.
- Cheyney, Ralph, and Trent, Lucia, Lady Godiva and St. Satyr Haggland, 1941.

=== Editor ===
- Cheyney, Ralph, and Trent, Lucia, America Arraigned! Dean & Co., New York, 1928.
- Cheyney, Ralph, and Trent, Lucia, Pilgrims to Parnassus Bozart Press, Atlanta, 1930.
- Cheyney, Ralph, and Trent, Lucia, Spring Choral Contemporary Vision Press, 1930.
- Cheyney, Ralph, and Trent, Lucia, Voices in the Dawn: A Verse Anthology Studies Publication, 1931.
- Cheyney, Ralph, and Trent, Lucia, Early Harvest Poetry Publishers, Philadelphia, 1932.
- Cheyney, Ralph, and Trent, Lucia, More Power to Poets: a Plea for More Poetry In Life, More Life In Poetry. H. Harrison, New York, 1934.
- Trent, Lucia, ed., Eros: An anthology of modern love poems H. Harrison, New York, 1939.
- Cheyney, Ralph, and Trent, Lucia, Music in Minature: An Anthology of Short Forms, The Carleton Company, San Antonio, 1942.

== Politics ==
Trent and Cheyney identified as "left wing socialists," supporting a wide variety of left-wing causes across their lifetimes. In 1930 Ralph Cheyney and Lucia Trent formed the Marcus Graham Defense Committee to fight against anarchist poet Marcus Graham's deportation to Canada. Both Cheyney and Trent were opposed to a bill introduced by Martin Dies Jr., the first chairman of the House Committee Investigating Un-American Activities, which would have deported foreign born Communists in 1932, and they signed the John Reed Club's petition against it. Lucia Trent continued to oppose the Dies Committee, aligning herself with the National Federation for Constitutional Liberties in 1943. Trent also denounced the anti-communism of the Daughters of the American Revolution in a 1931 telegram, stating that the organization had abandoned liberal principles for reactionary ones. In 1942 Lucia Trent supported military efforts in World War II by advocating to President Roosevelt the United States begin fighting in the second front in Europe. In 1946 Trent was a part of the Festus Coleman Defense Committee, and in 1951 she supported Willie McGee both African American men framed for assaulting white women.

== Death ==
Lucia Trent died on January 27, 1977, in Austin, Texas.

== Legacy ==
Lucia Trent's efforts to promote National Poetry Day grew into World Poetry Day and Poetry Month by the advocacy of fellow poets in the National Poetry Day Committee, including Dr. Etta Josephean Murfey, Dr. Frances Clark Handler, and Mary O'Connor of Philadelphia.

National Poetry Month was widely celebrated across the United States in October beginning in the 1950s. Prior to 1996 October was celebrated as national poetry month by the Academy of American Poets, National League of American Pen Women, National Federation of State Poetry Societies, and the California Federation of Chaparral Poets. In 1959 Academy of American Poets noted that over 100 poetry societies and 200 bookstores across the nation celebrated October as poetry month. Some celebrations in the 1980s and 1990s referred to October as World Poetry Month.
