= Vincent Godfrey Burns =

American poet

Vincent Godfrey Burns (1893 in Brooklyn – 1979) was Poet Laureate of Maryland, from 1962 until 1979.

== Life ==
He graduated from Penn State University in 1916, Harvard University, and Union Theological Seminary in 1922. He studied at Columbia University from 1922 to 1924. He served in World War I, in the 163rd Field Artillery. He was ordained as a Congregational minister. He married Edna Rodenberger in 1924; they had one daughter.

He collaborated with his brother, Robert, on I Am a Fugitive from a Georgia Chain Gang. It was made into a movie in 1932, by Warner Brothers, and it was nominated for several Academy Awards. He was appointed Poet Laureate of Maryland in 1962, by Governor J. Millard Tawes. There were attempts to unseat him, but he remained Poet Laureate of Maryland until his death in 1979.

His papers are held at the University of Maryland, Maryland Historical Society, Columbia University, Syracuse University, and Kent State University.

== Works ==
- The Master's Message for the New Day, Association Press, 1926
- The Red Harvest, a Cry for Peace, Macmillan, 1930; Granger Books, 1976
- I'm in Love with Life Dutton, 1932
- Female Convict Macauley, 1932; Pyramid, 1959
- America I Love You New World Books, 1957
- Flame Against the Night New World Books, 1959
- An American Poet Speaks New World Books, 1960
- Memories and Melodies of Maryland New World Books, 1964
- Maryland's Revolutionary Hero New World Books, 1965
- The Four Tests of a Loyal American Patriotic Women's Clubs of America, 1966
- Ballads of the Free State Bard New World Books, 1967
- Songs of the Free State Bards New World Books, 1967
- Heart on Fire New World Books, 1969
- World on Fire New World Books, 1969
- Red Fuse on a World Bomb New World Books, 1969
- The Sunny Side of Life New World Books, 1970
- Poetry is Fun New World Books, 1971
- The Story of Old Glory New World Books, 1972
- Redwood: And Other Poems, reprint Kessinger Publishing, LLC, 2010, ISBN 978-1-166-13265-1
- Vincent Godfrey Burns, Robert Elliott Burns, Out of these chains, New World Books, 1942
