= Edith Mirick =

American poet and editor (1883–1972)

Edith B. Mirick (November 16, 1883 – February 11, 1972), also known as Edith Graham Brown, was an American poet and editor.

== Biography ==
Mirick attended Columbian College (the forerunner to George Washington University).

Her poems were published in numerous journals including Poetry: A Magazine of Verse, Voices, Hound & Horn, and Palms. She published three books of poems: 5 Poets (1929), Flower and Weed (1930), and These Twinkling Acres (1935). She also edited two anthologies: Tanka and Hokku (1931), the first known anthology of tanka written in English, and District of Columbia Poets: An Anthology of 32 Contemporaries (1932).

On February 28, 1931, the Honolulu Star Bulletin reviewed her anthology, Flower and Weed, stating, “a quietness pervades the book of this gracious poet, who writes of gentle things, revealing deep sympathy with nature and expressing delicately her thoughts on the things that have concerned poets from time immemorial–the wistfulness for dear dead days, together with the freshness of contemplation of nature’s visible forms.”

She is buried with her husband, Lieutenant Carlos B. Mirick, at Arlington National Cemetery.
