= Louis Ginsberg =

American poet

- Born: October 1, 1895; Newark, New Jersey, U.S.
- Died: July 6, 1976 (aged 80)
- Education: Rutgers University
- Occupations: English teacher, poet
- Spouses: Naomi Ginsberg; Edith Ginsberg
- Children: 2, including Allen Ginsberg

Louis Ginsberg (1895–1976) was an American poet and father of poet Allen Ginsberg.

== Personal life ==
Louis Ginsberg was born in Newark, New Jersey, on October 1, 1895, to Pincus Ginsberg and Rebecca Schectman Ginsberg. His siblings included Abraham (Abe), Rose, Clara, and Hannah (Honey). Louis was stimulated to write poetry by Margaret Coult, a high school teacher who had him read Milton's L'Allegro or Il Penseroso, and write a poem like it. He retired from Central High School in 1961, although he began to teach grammar and composition at the Paterson, New Jersey, extension of Rutgers University until 1976. Louis and Naomi had two sons, Eugene Brooks Ginsberg in 1921 and Allen Ginsberg in 1926, both of whom became poets. Their marriage ended in divorce due to Naomi's institutionalization for mental illness. Her illness was the focal point for Allen's poem "Kaddish", in which he wrote: "and Louis needing a poor divorce, he wants to get married soon". Louis married Edith Cohen in 1950 with whom he spent the rest of his life. Louis died on July 6, 1976, and his son Allen, who learned to rhyme from his father, wrote the rhyming poem, Father Death Blues for him on July 8, 1976, over Lake Michigan.

Portraits of the Ginsberg family were taken by photographer Richard Avedon and exhibited at the Gagosian Gallery and the Israel Museum.

== Poetry ==
Louis' poems appeared in The Nation, The New Republic, The New York Times, Munsey's Magazine, The Forum, The Philadelphia Inquirer, The Masses, the New York Evening Post, Argosy, the Newark Evening News and other periodicals, as well as in Modern American Poetry: A Critical Anthology, Third Revised Edition (1925) and Modern British Poetry, both edited by Louis Untermeyer. Louis' first book of poetry, The Attic of the Past and other Lyrics, was privately published. He subsidized the publishing of The Everlasting Minute in 1937. In 1970, William Morrow and Company published Morning in Spring, his third book and the first book that he did not have to subsidize. Allen Ginsberg wrote the introduction to this book. Louis' last book, Our Times, was never published on its own. Michael Fournier collected and edited his poems, including those that would have been in Our Times.

== "Microscope" ==
A lost poem by Ginsberg, entitled "Microscope", was found in a copy of the seventeenth edition of Simon Henry Gage's book The Microscope in the Rare and Manuscript Collections at Cornell University.

== Puns ==
Ginsberg published puns in the Newark Star Ledger under the heading "Keep an O'Pun Mind". He often asked and answered, "Is life worth living? It depends on the liver." His collection of puns was never published, but can be found in Box 2, Folder 9, in the Louis Ginsberg Papers at Stanford University. Louis Ginsberg, who died of liver and spleen cancer, told his son Allen, "I never thought my pun would come back to bite me."

== Letters ==
The letters written between Ginsberg and his son Allen were edited by Michael Schumacher and published as Family Business: Selected Letters Between a Father and Son.
