= List of Oklahoma City University alumni =

Oklahoma City University is a private university in Oklahoma City, Oklahoma. Following are some of its notable alumni.

== Arts ==
- Lois Harjo Ball – painter, basket maker, and ceramic artist
- Bert Seabourn (1961 Certificate of Art) – expressionist painter

== Business ==
- Wanda L. Bass – philanthropist and chairman of the First National Bank and Trust of McAlester
- Jack Worthington – investment banker

== Education ==
- Andrew K. Benton (J.D.) – president of Pepperdine University and as an interim president at the University of Central Oklahoma
- Florence Birdwell (1945, BA and MA) – professor of voice at the Bass School of Music at Oklahoma City University from 1946 to 2013
- Carroll Freeman (MA Performing Arts) – operatic tenor, director of the opera program at the University of Tennessee and Georgia State University
- Jeane Porter Hester (1963) – former professor of medicine, Chief of Supportive Therapy, and Chief of Leukapheresis at University of Texas MD Anderson Cancer Center
- Beverly Hoch (1975 Music) – coloratura soprano and music instructor at Texas Woman's University
- Timothy Long – conductor, pianist, and member of the faculty at the Stony Brook University
- Alice Marriott (1930 English and French) – associate professor of anthropology at the University of Oklahoma and field representative with the U.S. Department of Interior Indian Arts and Craft Board
- Jim Roth (1994) – Dean of the OCU School of Law and Oklahoma Corporation Commission 2007–2009
- W. Stephen Smith (1981 MPA0 – Northwestern University Professor of Voice and Opera

== Entertainment ==
- Sarah Coburn (1994 MA Music) – operatic soprano
- Kristin Chenoweth (1990 Musical Theater) – Tony Award and Emmy Award-winning actress
- Stephen Dickson (1973) – operatic baritone
- Sam Douglas (BFA directing) – actor
- Mack Harrell – operatic and concert baritone vocalist
- Chris Harrison (1993 BA Mass Communication) – television personality, host of The Bachelor
- Erika Hebron (2009 Performing Arts in Dance) – Miss Missouri 2010
- Jane Anne Jayroe (1968) – Miss America of 1967, television anchor, and Oklahoma Secretary of Tourism and Recreation
- William Johns (1961) – opera singer
- Gwendolyn Jones – operatic mezzo-soprano
- Marquita Lister (198 – operatic soprano
- Kurt Loder – entertainment critic, author, columnist, and television personality best known for his role at MTV News
- Stacey Logan (1985) – Broadway actress
- Lakshmi Manchu – actress, producer, and television presenter
- Chris Merritt (1974) – Grammy Award-nominated operatic tenor
- Leona Mitchell (1970) – operatic soprano and Music Hall of Fame inductee
- April Nelson (2014) – Miss Louisiana 2015 and third runner-up to Miss America
- Cathy O'Donnell (1945) – actress
- Kelli O'Hara (1998) – Seven-time Tony Award nominated actress
- Susan Powell (1984) – Miss America 1981
- Bill Randle (J.D.). – disc jockey, lawyer and university professor
- Lisa Reagan – singer, composer, pianist, musician, and former Miss Oklahoma
- Gabrielle Ruiz (2007 BFA dance performance) – actress
- Checkley Sin (MBA) – film producer and 2022 candidate for Chief Executive of Hong Kong
- Shawntel Smith (2000) – Miss America 1996
- Gerald Steichen (1986) – New York City Opera conductor for Cats and The Phantom of the Opera
- Fred Tackett – songwriter and multi-instrumentalist best known as a member of the band Little Feat
- Lara Teeter (1976) – Tony Award-nominated actor, theatre director, and professor
- Mason Williams (1958) – Grammy and Emmy Award-winning composer, writer who created of "Classical Gas"
- Alison Sloan (2020) – musician

== Government and civil service ==
- Carl Alexandre – Special Representative for the United Nations Stabilization Mission in Haiti and U.S. Department of Justice deputy
- Michael D. Brown (1981) – First Director and Administrator of Federal Emergency Management Agency (FEMA) 2003–2005
- Janie Simms Hipp – General Counsel of the United States Department of Agriculture and founder of the U.S. Department of Agriculture's (USDA) Office of Tribal Relations
- Jane Anne Jayroe (1968) – Oklahoma Secretary of Tourism and Recreation, Miss America of 1967, and television anchor
- Alice Marriott (1930 English and French) – field representative with the U.S. Department of Interior Indian Arts and Craft Board and associate professor of anthropology at the University of Oklahoma

== Law ==
- Carl Alexandre – U.S. Department of Justice Deputy and Special Representative for the United Nations Stabilization Mission in Haiti
- Deborah Barnes (1983) – Judge, Oklahoma Court of Civil Appeals
- Doug Combs (1976 J.D._ – Chief Justice of the Oklahoma Supreme Court
- Barry Grissom – United States Attorney for the District of Kansas
- Carol Hansen (1974) – Judge, Oklahoma Court of Civil Appeals
- Elizabeth A. Hayden (1980) – District Judge for Stearns County, Minnesota
- Yvonne Kauger (1969) – Justice, Supreme Court of Oklahoma
- Vern Miller – Kansas attorney general from 1971 to 1975
- Marian P. Opala (1953) – Justice, Supreme Court of Oklahoma 1978–2010
- Gary Richardson – United States Attorney for the Eastern District of Oklahoma
- Alma Wilson – first woman to serve on the Oklahoma Supreme Court
- James R. Winchester (1977) – Chief Justice, Supreme Court of Oklahoma 2007–2009

== Literature and journalism ==
- Royal Alexander – lawyer and congressional staff member
- Rana Husseini (1990 BA, 1993 MLA) – Award-winning journalist and human rights activist
- William Harjo LoneFight (1991) – Native American author
- Leslie A. McRill – the ninth poet laureate of Oklahoma

== Military ==
- Edmond Harjo – Seminole Nation of Oklahoma Code Talker during World War II, 2013 recipient of the Congressional Gold Medal
- David L. Goldfein – Air Force Chief of Staff
- Rick Rescorla – British-American soldier, police officer, educator and private security specialist
- Robert J. Skinner – United States Air Force lieutenant general currently serving as the Director of Defense Information Systems Agency
- Eugene L. Tattini – retired lieutenant general in the United States Air Force and served as deputy director of the Jet Propulsion Laboratory

== Politics ==
- Hannah Atkins (1986) – Oklahoma Secretary of State 1987–1991
- Danny Britt – member of the North Carolina Senate
- Brian Bushweller ( BA Music) – member of the Delaware Senate,
- Jeff Cloud (1991 J.D.) – Commissioner of the Oklahoma Corporation Commission
- Brandon Creighton (J. D.) – Member of the Texas Senate
- Jose Cruz – Oklahoma House of Representatives
- Brooks Douglass – member of the Oklahoma Senate
- Mickey Edwards (1969 J.D.) – served eight terms in United States House of Representatives
- Enoch Kelly Haney (1964) – Principal Chief of the Seminole Nation of Oklahoma
- Carri Hicks – Oklahoma Senate
- David Holt (1909) – Mayor of Oklahoma City
- Ernest Istook (1976) – United States House of Representatives
- A. Visanio Johnson – Oklahoma House of Representatives
- Phillip Journey – Kansas Senate and judge Kansas's 18th Judicial District Court for Division 1
- Steven T. Kuykendall (1968) – member of the United States Congress representing California's 36th congressional district 1999–2001
- Todd Lamb (2005) – Oklahoma Lieutenant Governor 2011–2019, Majority leader of the Oklahoma State Senate 2004–2011
- Keith Leftwich – Oklahoma State Senate
- Richard Lerblance (1979) – Oklahoma State Senate
- Lin Hsin-i – Taiwanese Minister of Economic Affairs and Vice Premier
- Angela Monson (Criminal justice) – Oklahoma State House of Representatives
- Anthony Moore – Oklahoma House of Representatives
- Tim Moore (1995) – Speaker of the House, North Carolina General Assembly
- Johnston Murray (1946) – Governor, State of Oklahoma 1951–1955
- Kenneth Nance – lawyer, lobbyist, member of Oklahoma House of Representatives
- Ron Norick – mayor of Oklahoma City, Oklahoma
- Leon C. Phillips (1916) – 11th governor of Oklahoma
- Arsyadjuliandi Rachman (1987 MBA) – Indonesian politician who served as governor of Riau
- T. W. Shannon – Oklahoma House of Representatives
- Jason Smith – U.S. House of Representatives and Missouri House of Representatives
- Steve Smith – member of the Minnesota House of Representatives
- Mike Thompson – member of the Oklahoma House of Representatives
- Ray Vaughn – Oklahoma House of Representatives
- Yeo Jun Wei – Singaporean convicted of espionage by the United States on behalf of the People's Republic of China
- Marvin York – President pro tempore of the Oklahoma Senate

== Religion ==
- Craig Groeschel (1991 Marketing) – founder and senior pastor of Life.Church
- William C. Wantland – Bishop of the Episcopal Diocese of Eau Claire

== Sports ==
- Carl Allen – professional football player
- John Barfield – former MLB pitcher for the Texas Rangers
- Richard Benigno – professional soccer player
- Susie Berning – professional golfer on the LPGA tour with 4 major wins and 12 total wins
- Joe Bisenius (2004) – MLB pitcher for the Philadelphia Phillies
- Karl Coombes – tennis coach and player
- Tony Dawson – former professional tennis player
- Dino Delevski – former professional soccer player for the Kansas City Comets
- Os Doenges – college football coach
- Gary Gray – former NBA guard for the Cincinnati Royals
- Ace Gutowsky – professional football player
- Paul Hansen – head men's basketball coach at Oklahoma City University, Oklahoma State University–Stillwater, and University of Science and Arts of Oklahoma
- Carl Henry – professional basketball player
- Gary Hill – former NBA guard for the San Francisco Warriors
- Hal Hilpirt – professional football player
- Rubin Jackson – college and professional basketball player
- Marisue Jacutin – former professional tennis player
- Jim Kamp – professional football player
- Bud Koper (1964) – former NBA player and All-American basketball player
- Allen Leavell (1979) – former NBA guard for the Houston Rockets
- Abe Lemons (1949) – former basketball coach for Oklahoma City University and the University of Texas at Austin
- Eric Manuel – former professional basketball player
- Keith Miller – former professional baseball player, who played in Major League Baseball
- Nick Mohtadi – former professional tennis player
- Todd Overgard – former Association of Tennis Professionals tour tennis player
- Taiwo Rafiu (1994) – women's basketball Olympian for Nigeria
- Hub Reed (1958) – former NBA center for the Los Angeles Lakers and Detroit Pistons
- Ivan Saičić – professional basketball player
- Freddy Sanchez – MLB infielder for the San Francisco Giants and 2006 National League batting champion
- Ralph Schilling (1941) – former NFL player for the Washington Redskins
- Chris Schroder (2001) – MLB pitcher for the Florida Marlins
- Marion Shirley – professional football player
- Arnold Short (1954) – NCAA All-American and 1955 AAU All-American basketball player Phillips 66ers
- Dave Simmons – former NBL basketball player, father of NBA player Ben Simmons
- Beeyong Sison – professional tennis player and coach
- Chas Skelly – NAIA All-American wrestler; professional Mixed Martial Artist, current Featherweight in the UFC
- Bruce Sloan – Major League Baseball player who played for the New York Giants
- Bryant Smith – former professional basketball player
- Chris Spendlove – former professional soccer player
- Dušan Stević – former professional basketball player
- Dick Stone (1934) – former MLB pitcher for the Washington Senators
- Zouhair Talbi – long distance runner
- Hugh Taylor – professional football player and coach
- Ashur Tolliver – former Major League Baseball pitcher
- K. T. Turner – college basketball coach
- Orville Tuttle – professional football player and college football coach
- Tyrone van Aswegen – professional golfer who played on the PGA Tour
- Harry Vines (1961) – former director of USA Basketball and prominent member of the wheelchair basketball community
- Jim Wade – professional football player
- Daniela Wallen – professional basketball player
- Jim Ware – professional basketball player
- Jerry Lee Wells – professional basketball player
- Brad Wieck – professional baseball pitcher
- Basil Wilkerson – professional football player
- Buzz Williams (1994) – head men's basketball coach for Texas A&M

== Other ==
- Thomas Radecki – former psychiatrist, convicted criminal, and founding member of the National Coalition on Television Violence
