= Nathan Brown (poet) =

American singer-songwriter and poet

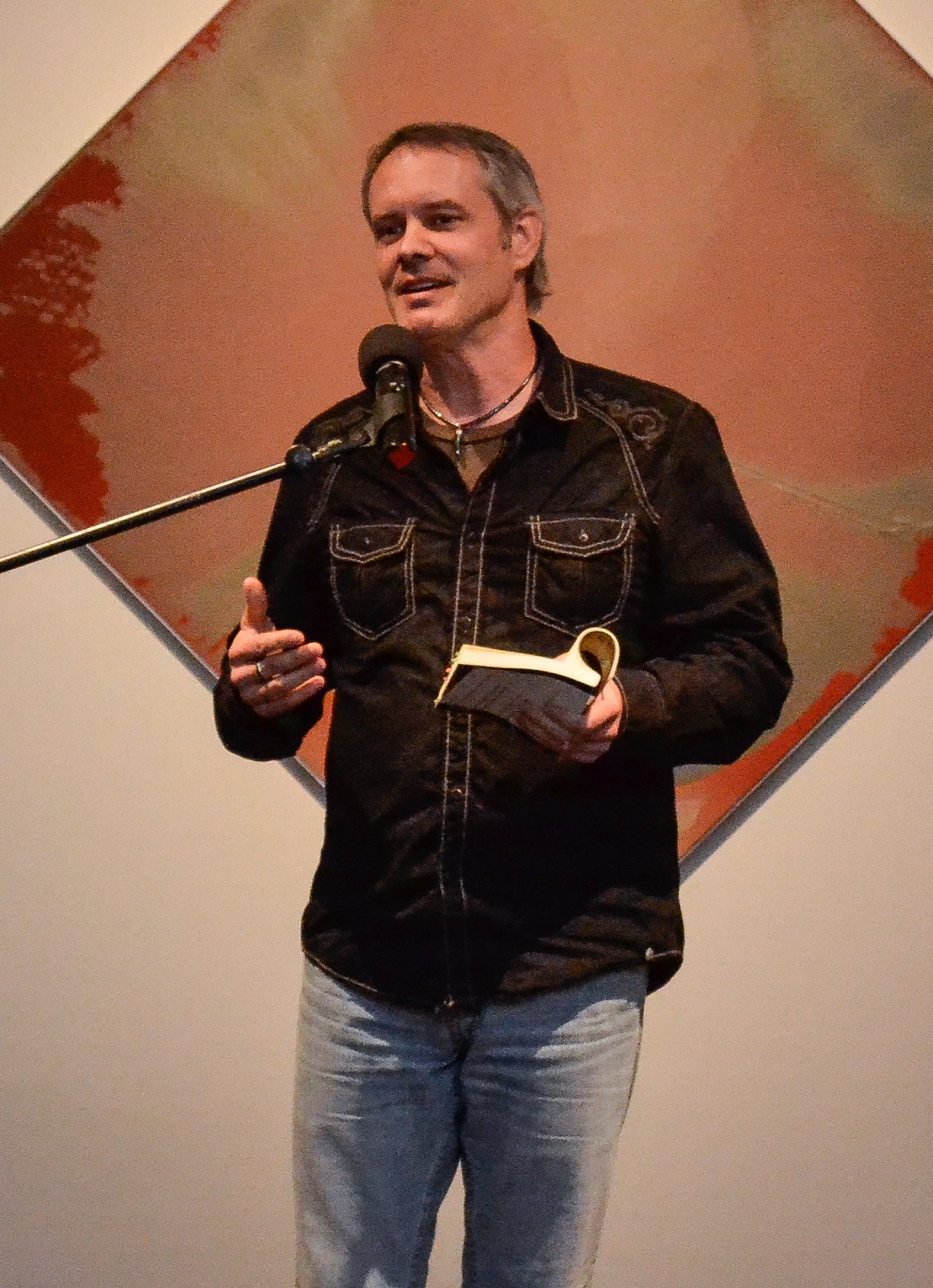
- Brown in 2013
- Occupation: Poet, author, singer-songwriter
- Notable awards: 2009 Oklahoma Book Award

Website
- www.brownlines.com

Nathan Brown is an author, singer-songwriter, and award-winning poet who served as the Oklahoma Poet Laureate from 2013 to 2014.

== Life ==
Nathan Brown was born in Longview, Texas on March 16, 1965. His family moved to Norman, Oklahoma in January 1970, where he grew up and went to college. He was a professional musician in Nashville, Tennessee in his 20s and 30s. He now hails from Wimberley, a small town in the Hill Country of Texas where he has lived with his wife, Ashley, since 2013.

Nathan holds an interdisciplinary PhD in English and Journalism with an emphasis in Creative and Professional Writing from the University of Oklahoma. After teaching at OU for almost twenty years, he returned to the Austin area to be closer to the music scene there and tours the country full-time as a poet, musician, and workshop leader. He has published 20 books, one of which (Two Tables Over) won the Oklahoma Book Award for Poetry, and another, Karma Crisis: New and Selected Poems, was a finalist for the Paterson Poetry Prize in New Jersey. He is the founder of Mezcalita Press.

Brown has performed at numerous events including the Wordfest at the Waco Arts Cultural Fest, the Taos Poetry Festival, and the Woody Guthrie Folk Festival. Brown has taught many writing workshops, including writing family stories at the Moore Library, the Writers Workshop at Norman Public Library, and ekphrastic poetry at the Fred Jones Museum of Art, He was an artist-in-residence at the University of Central Oklahoma. He also began as the instructor for the Descanso Creatives intensive workshop series in 2018. The workshops are a "deep-dive" and culturally-immersive writing experience. Beginning in Tuscany, Italy, future workshops are planned for Ireland (2019) and France (2020).

Brown edited the 2014 anthology Oklahoma Poems and their Poets which includes poetry by several notable poets, including Joy Harjo, Jeanetta Calhoun Mish, Naomi Shihab Nye, Benjamin Myers, Quraysh Ali Lansana, Carol Hamilton, Francine Ringold, and N. Scott Momaday.

== Awards ==
- Oklahoma Book Award for Two Tables Over (2009)

== Works ==
=== Books ===
- 100 Years (Mezcalita Press, 2019)
- An Honest Day's Confession (Mezcalita Press, 2018)
- An Honest Day's Prayer (Mezcalita Press, 2017)
- An Honest Day's Ode (Mezcalita Press, 2017)
- I Shouldn't Say... The Mostly Unedited Poems of Ezra E. Lipschitz (Mezcalita Press, 2017)
- Arse Poetica: The Mostly Unedited Poems of Ezra E. Lipschitz (Mezcalita Press, 2017)
- Apocalypse Soon: The Mostly Unedited Poems of Ezra E. Lipschitz (Mezcalita Press, 2017)
- Don't Try, a collection of co-written poems with Jon Dee Graham (Mezcalita Press, 2016)
- My Salvaged Heart: Story of a Cautious Courtship (Mezcalita Press, 2016)
- To Sing Hallucinated: First Thoughts on Last Words (Mezcalita Press, 2015)
- Less Is More, More or Less (Mezcalita Press, 2013)
- Karma Crisis:New and Selected Poems (Mezcalita Press, 2012)
- Letters to the One-Armed Poet: A Memoir of Friendship, Loss, and Butternut Squash Ravioli (Village Books Press, 2011)
- My Sideways Heart (Mongrel Empire Press, 2010)
- Two Tables Over (Village Books Press, 2008)
- Not Exactly Job (Mongrel Empire Press, 2007)
- Ashes over the Southwest (Greystone Press, 2005)
- Suffer the Little Voices (Greystone Press, 2005)
- Hobson's Choice (Greystone Press, 2002)

=== Anthologies ===
==== Editor ====
- Oklahoma Poems, and Their Poets Mezcalita Press. 2014. ISBN 978-0983738329

==== Contributor ====
- Ain't Nobody That Can Sing Like Me: New Oklahoma Writing Mongrel Empire Press. 2010. ISBN 978-0980168495
- Waco Cultural Arts Fest: WordFest Anthology 2017 CreateSpace Independent Publishing Platform. 2017. ISBN 9781973833277
- The Working Man’s Hand: Celebrating Woody Guthrie Poems of Protest and Resistance Fine Dog Press. 2023. ISBN 9781955478168

=== Discography ===
- The Streets of San Miguel (2019)
- Gypsy Moon (2009)
- The Why in the Road
- Driftin' Away
- Fall
- What does this have to do with anything?

== See also ==
- Poets Laureate of Oklahoma
