= Carl Sennhenn =

Former poet laureate of Oklahoma, US

14th Poet Laureate of Oklahoma
- In office 2001–2003
- Preceded by: Joe Kreger
- Succeeded by: Francine Ringold

Personal details
- Born: Carl George Braun Sennhenn Baltimore, Maryland, U.S.
- Died: Norman, Oklahoma, U.S.
- Education: University of Oklahoma (BA, MA)

Carl George Braun Sennhenn (May 24, 1936 – August 2, 2024) was an American writer and academic who served from as the 14th Poet Laureate of Oklahoma from 2001 until 2003. Along with Francine Ringold, he was one of two poets to win the Oklahoma Book Award for Poetry twice, in 2007 and in 2013. He was a former professor at Rose State College, where he also served as a Dean of Humanities.

== Life and education ==
Sennhenn was born in Baltimore, Maryland and raised in Norman, Oklahoma. He earned a Bachelor of Arts and Master of Arts from the University of Oklahoma, in 1958 and 1960 respectively. He died in August 2024 at the age of 88 in Norman.

== Career ==
Sennhenn worked as an educator for over 60 years, from the elementary to college level. Even in semi-retirement, he continued to teach Creative Writing for senior adults at Rose State College.

== Bibliography ==
- The Center of Noon. Norman: Poetry Around, 1989
- Harvest of Light. Norman: Poetry Around, 1987
- Nocturns and Sometimes, Even I. Cheyenne, OK: Village Books Press, 2012.
- Travels Through Enchanted Woods. Cheyenne, OK: Village Books Press, 2006.
- Trespassing: Songs of Love, Coals of Kindness. Village Books Press, 2017.

== See also ==
- Poets Laureate of Oklahoma
