= Vian, Oklahoma =

Vian, Oklahoma Cherokee: ᏓᏄᎪᎢ
- Town
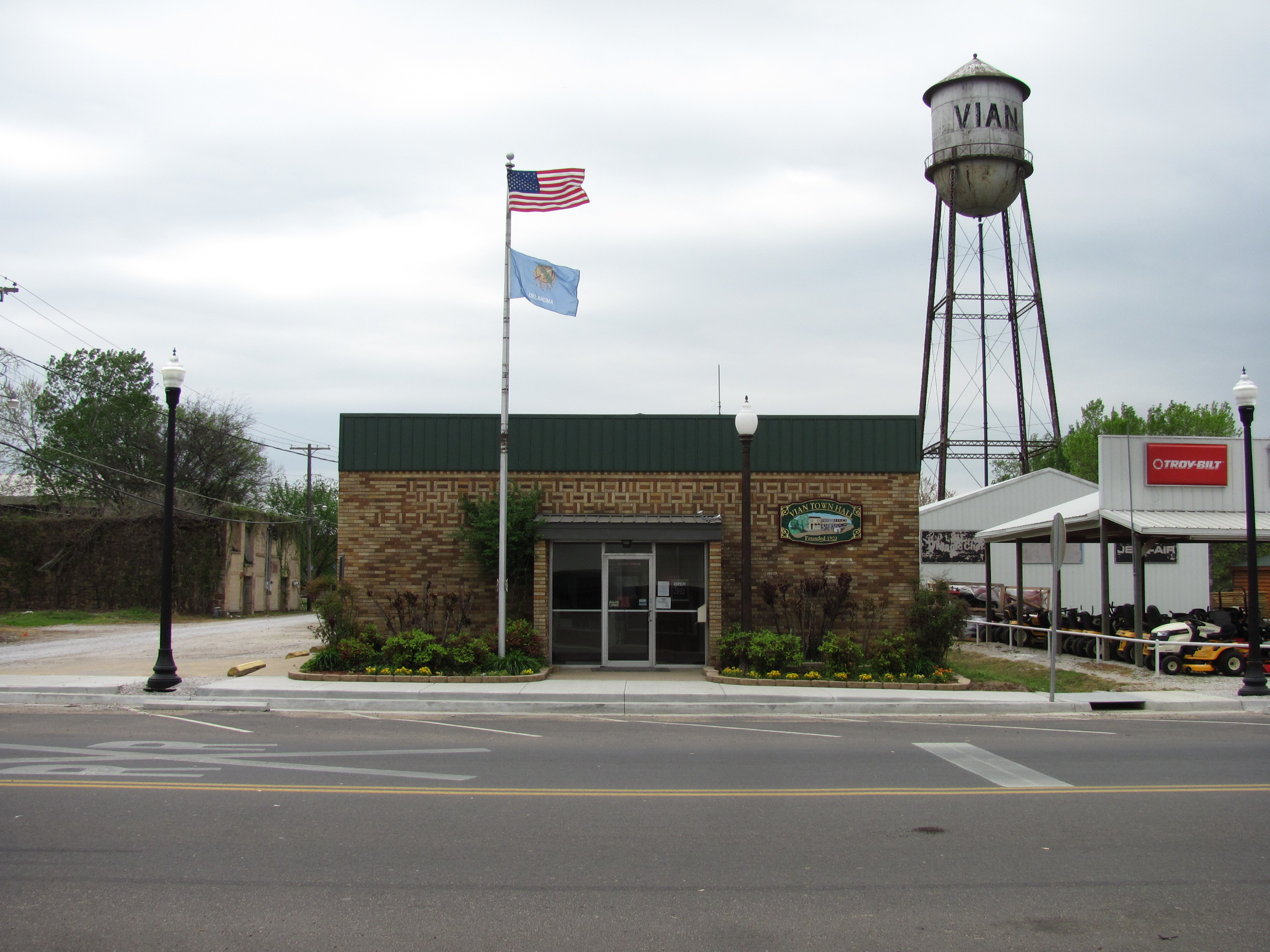
- Vian Town Hall

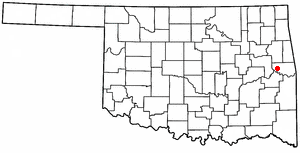
- Location of Vian, Oklahoma
- Coordinates: 35°29′42″N 94°58′10″W
- Country: United States
- State: Oklahoma
- County: Sequoyah

Government
  - Mayor: Dennis Fletcher

Area
  - Total: 1.38 sq mi (3.58 km^{2})
  - Land: 1.34 sq mi (3.47 km^{2})
  - Water: 0.042 sq mi (0.11 km^{2})
- Elevation: 558 ft (170 m)

Population (2020)
  - Total: 1,374
  - Density: 1,026.6/sq mi (396.37/km^{2})
- Time zone: UTC-6 (Central (CST))
  - Summer (DST): UTC-5 (CDT)
- ZIP code: 74962
- Area codes: 539/918
- FIPS code: 40-77250
- GNIS feature ID: 2413431

Vian (Cherokee: ᏓᏄᎪᎢ, romanized: da-hnu-go-i, lit. 'gar-place') is a town in Sequoyah County, Oklahoma, United States, adjacent to Interstate 40 at the intersection of U.S. Route 64 and Oklahoma State Highway 82. The population was 1,374 at the 2020 census, a 6.3 percent decline from the figure of 1,466 recorded in 2010. It is part of the Fort Smith Metropolitan Statistical Area.

== History ==
At the time of European contact, the area around what is now Vian was inhabited and controlled, but not settled, by the Osage, who used it as hunting ground. The name "Vian" is a corruption of viande, the French word for "meat"; French traders called Vian Creek "bayou viande", literally "meat bayou".

The area was part of the controversial Lovely's Purchase made in 1816, which opened pre-removal Cherokee settlement in the area, then part of the Missouri Territory; the area became part of the Arkansas Territory in 1819. After the Indian Removal Act, Cherokees were given control of the area under the original jurisdiction of the pre-statehood Cherokee Nation, within the Indian Territory. In the process, Dwight Mission was moved to the area from Russellville.

Vian was initially settled as a trading post between Big Vian and Little Vian creeks in the Illinois District of the Cherokee Nation. When a post office was established in 1886, the first postmaster, Mahala Thompson, wanted to name the town Round Mountain, which was already in use; the post office was thus named Vian, for the two creeks. After the Kansas and Arkansas Valley Railway (later the St. Louis, Iron Mountain and Southern Railway and eventually the Missouri Pacific Railroad) laid tracks through the town in 1888, it became an important shipping point for cotton, with an estimated 2,500-3,000 bales shipped annually by 1901. When Oklahoma achieved statehood in 1907, Vian became part of the new state as the Cherokee Nation was all but dissolved. Today, the town lies within the jurisdiction of the modern-day Cherokee Nation of Oklahoma.

Vian's education system dates back to the late 1880s, when a mission school for Cherokee children was established; a white school was established in the 1890s. Vian was also home to the Douglass High School, which served the region's African-American students. The district was integrated in the mid-1950s.

Today, Vian's economy is based largely around tourism and services, owing to its location along Interstate 40 and its proximity to Sequoyah National Wildlife Refuge, Robert S. Kerr Reservoir and Tenkiller Ferry Lake. Agriculture remains prominent in the local economy as well.

== Geography ==
Vian is located 11 miles (18 km) west of Sallisaw.

According to the United States Census Bureau, the town has a total area of 0.8 square miles (2.1 km^{2}), all land.

== Demographics ==
Historical population
Census	Pop.	Note	%±
1900	296		—
1910	794		168.2%
1920	1,176		48.1%
1930	900		−23.5%
1940	941		4.6%
1950	927		−1.5%
1960	930		0.3%
1970	1,131		21.6%
1980	1,521		34.5%
1990	1,414		−7.0%
2000	1,362		−3.7%
2010	1,466		7.6%
2020	1,374		−6.3%
U.S. Decennial Census

=== 2020 census ===
As of the 2020 census, Vian had a population of 1,374. The median age was 36.7 years. 28.9% of residents were under the age of 18 and 20.5% of residents were 65 years of age or older. For every 100 females there were 80.1 males, and for every 100 females age 18 and over there were 74.2 males age 18 and over.

0.0% of residents lived in urban areas, while 100.0% lived in rural areas.

There were 534 households in Vian, of which 37.8% had children under the age of 18 living in them. Of all households, 37.1% were married-couple households, 15.2% were households with a male householder and no spouse or partner present, and 39.0% were households with a female householder and no spouse or partner present. About 29.1% of all households were made up of individuals and 15.2% had someone living alone who was 65 years of age or older.

There were 625 housing units, of which 14.6% were vacant. The homeowner vacancy rate was 4.7% and the rental vacancy rate was 8.4%.

Racial composition as of the 2020 census
Race	Number	Percent
White	607	44.2%
Black or African American	66	4.8%
American Indian and Alaska Native	446	32.5%
Asian	5	0.4%
Native Hawaiian and Other Pacific Islander	1	0.1%
Some other race	11	0.8%
Two or more races	238	17.3%
Hispanic or Latino (of any race)	59	4.3%

=== 2000 census ===
As of the census of 2000, there were 1,362 people, 503 households, and 339 families residing in the town. The population density was 1,702.3 inhabitants per square mile (657.3/km^{2}). There were 558 housing units at an average density of 697.4 units per square mile (269.3 units/km^{2}). The racial makeup of the town was 51.54% White, 6.98% African American, 26.51% Native American, 0.07% Asian, 0.22% from other races, and 14.68% from two or more races. Hispanic or Latino of any race were 2.13% of the population.

There were 503 households, out of which 35.4% had children under the age of 18 living with them, 44.3% were married couples living together, 17.9% had a female householder with no husband present, and 32.6% were non-families. 30.2% of all households were made up of individuals, and 14.9% had someone living alone who was 65 years of age or older. The average household size was 2.49 and the average family size was 3.10.

In the town, the population was spread out, with 28.6% under the age of 18, 7.2% from 18 to 24, 25.5% from 25 to 44, 19.9% from 45 to 64, and 18.9% who were 65 years of age or older. The median age was 36 years. For every 100 females, there were 83.1 males. For every 100 females age 18 and over, there were 76.9 males.

The median income for a household in the town was $18,264, and the median income for a family was $24,167. Males had a median income of $26,731 versus $16,806 for females. The per capita income for the town was $10,471. About 28.2% of families and 35.6% of the population were below the poverty line, including 42.2% of those under age 18 and 33.5% of those age 65 or over.

== Notable people ==
- Maggie Culver Fry (1900–1998), tenth poet laureate of Oklahoma
- Franklin Gritts, Cherokee painter
- Captain Frederick F. Henry, United States Army (Deceased), Korean War Medal of Honor recipient
- Richard Jordan, NFL linebacker for Kansas City Chiefs and Detroit Lions
- Bobby Ussery, Hall of Fame jockey
- Kenyatta Wright, NFL Linebacker for the New York Jets
