= Benjamin Myers (disambiguation) =

Benjamin Myers (born 1978) is an Australian theologian and religious writer.

Ben Myers or Benjamin Myers may also refer to:

- Ben Myers (born 1976), English writer and journalist
- Benjamin Myers (born 1975), American poet, essayist, educator and musician

== See also ==
- Myers
