= KIU =

Kiu or KIU may refer to:

== Universities ==
- Kampala International University, in Uganda
- Karakoram International University, in Gilgit, Pakistan
- Kutaisi International University, in Kutaisi, Georgia
- Kobe International University, in Kobe, Japan
- Kyiv International University, in Ukraine
- Kyoto International University, in Kyōtanabe, Japan
- Kyushu International University, in Kitakyūshū, Japan

== Languages ==
- Kirmanjki language, the northern dialect of Zaza, spoken in eastern Turkey

== Other uses ==
- Kent Intake Unit, a migrant processing centre in the United Kingdom
- Kid Icarus: Uprising, a 2012 video game for the Nintendo 3DS.
- Kiu, a settlement in Kenya
- Kurdistan Islamic Union, a political party in Iraq
- kilo–international unit (kIU), in pharmacology
- Kiu (喜雨) - a Kigo, – late summer – lit. "pleasure rain"; rain that falls after hot and dry weather
