= Phillips University =

Christian university in Enid, Oklahoma, US

Coordinates: 36°23′49″N 97°50′41″W

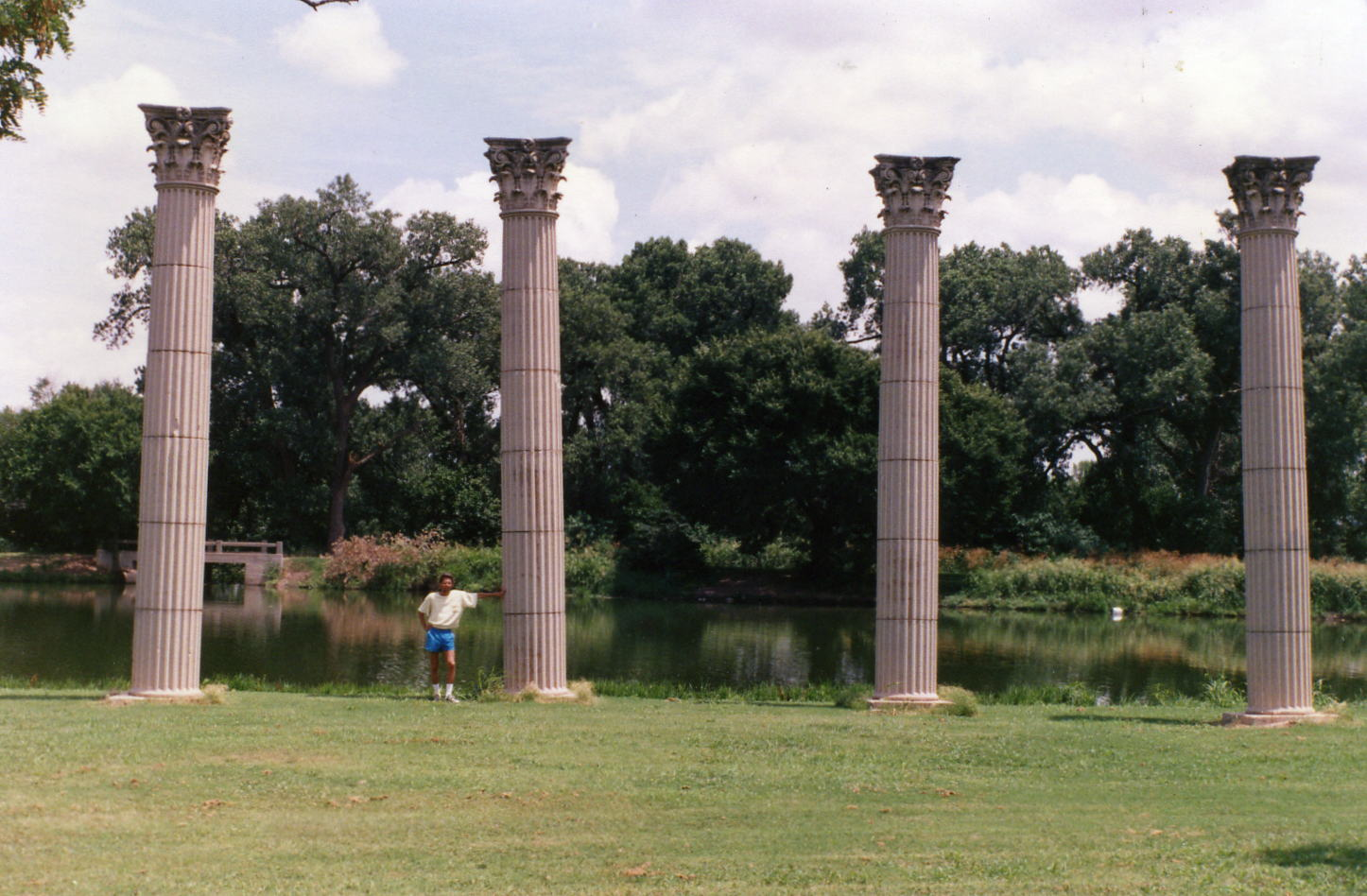
- Pillars from the Sunken Gardens at Phillips University
- Motto: Vincit Omnia Veritas (Latin)
- Motto in English: Truth conquers all things
- Type: Private university
- Active: 1906–1998
- Religious affiliation: Christian Church (Disciples of Christ)
- Location: Enid, Oklahoma, US
- Campus: Purchased in June 1999 by Northern Oklahoma College
- Colors: Maroon and White
- Nickname: Haymakers/Fillies (women's teams)
- Mascot: Lil Hay (a skunk)
- Website: www.phillips.edu

Phillips University was a private university in Enid, Oklahoma, United States. It opened in 1906 and closed in 1998. It was affiliated with the Christian Church (Disciples of Christ). It included an undergraduate college and a graduate seminary. The university was also home to the Enid-Phillips Symphony Orchestra, and its campus regularly hosted events for the Tri-State Music Festival.

== History ==
Originally named Oklahoma Christian University, the school was founded by Ely Vaughn Zollars on October 9, 1906. Enid-area businessmen raised $150,000 and purchased a 40-acre (160,000 m^{2}) campus east of Enid. Though ultimately the university would base its teachings on the Disciples of Christ denomination, the committee to bring a university to Enid had a more diverse religious background: Edmund Frantz (Presbyterian), Frank Hamilton (United Brethren, Disciple), Al Loewen (Jewish), J.M. Pieratt (Disciple), and Everett Purcell (Presbyterian). Funding for the operation of the university was supplied by Thomas Wharton Phillips of Butler, Pennsylvania and the Disciples of Christ Churches of Oklahoma. Following Phillips' death in 1912 the university was renamed in his honor. During World War II, the Permanente ship builders manufactured a victory ship named after the university called the SS Phillips Victory (VC2-S-AP2, MC Hull Number 758).

Oklahoma Christian University held its first classes September 17, 1907. The first year's enrollment was 256 students, and of the freshman class, only 20 had completed high school. Phillips High School was created in 1907 as a preparatory school at the same time to prepare students for college-level courses, and continued operations until 1925. The school became affiliated with the North Central Association of Colleges on March 23, 1919, and in the American Association of Colleges in 1920.

In 1987, Phillips Graduate Seminary incorporated as a freestanding institution independent of Phillips University. It is now known as Phillips Theological Seminary, and is located in Tulsa, Oklahoma. Currently, Phillips Theological Seminary houses the transcripts of the alumni of Phillips University.

Phillips University also ran a graduate business school which awarded MBA degrees, and was well recognized in the states of Oklahoma and Texas. It also had a large international community of students from more than 20 countries.

=== Bankruptcy, closure, and Legacy Foundation ===
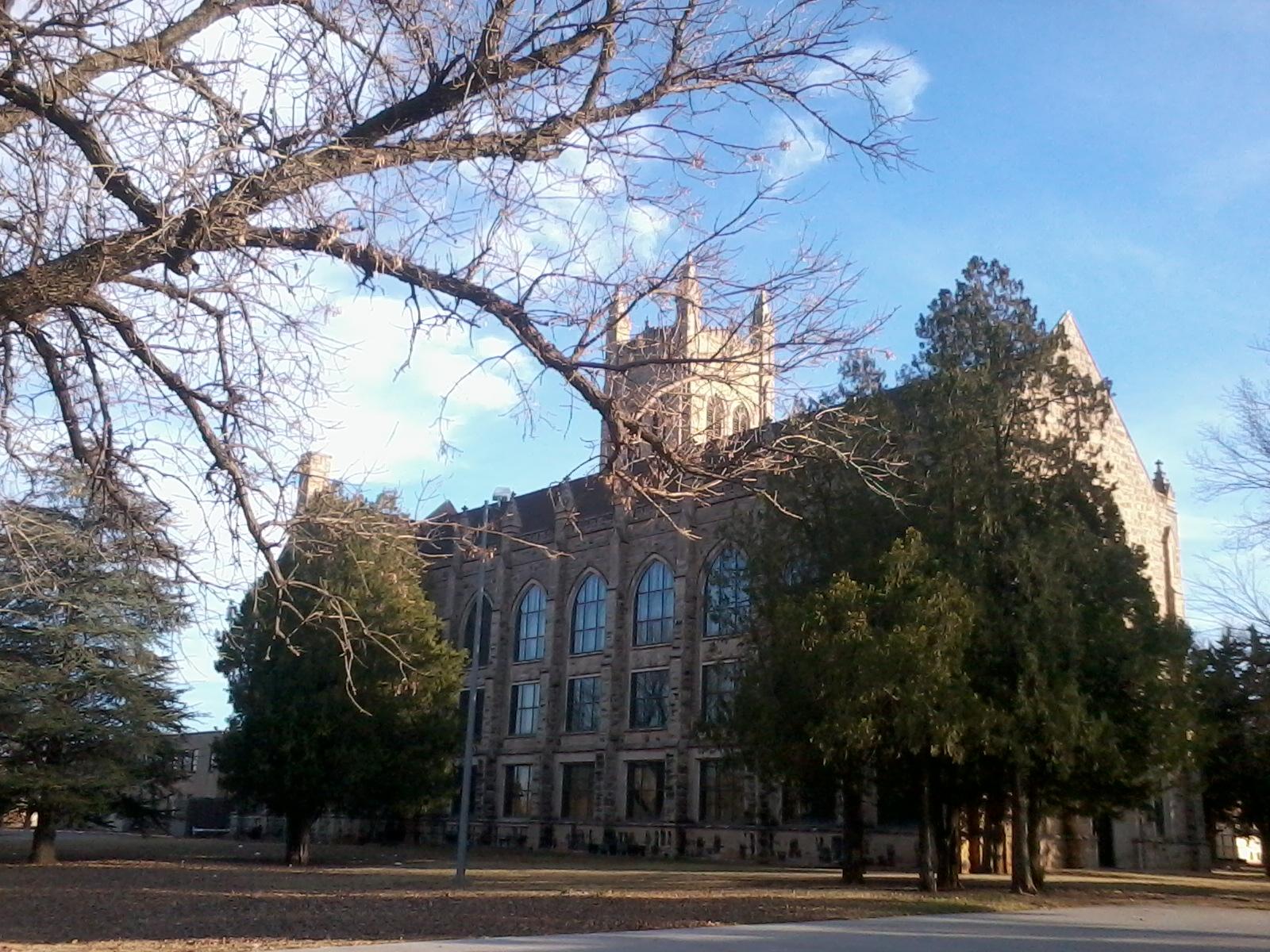
The Marshall Building on the former Phillips campus

Due to financial problems and decreasing enrollment, Phillips filed Chapter 11 bankruptcy on April 1, 1998, and closed its doors four months later.

After the bankruptcy of the university in 1998, the liquidation of assets yielded $3 million in funds for the formation of the Phillips University Legacy Foundation, which, in honoring the legacy of the university, awards scholarships and provides leadership development opportunities to undergraduate and graduate students attending Disciples of Christ-related colleges and universities. They also administer leadership programs such as the Annual Leadership Development Conference and the Volunteer Leadership Projects.

The Phillips University Alumni and Friends Association also exists, serving as a voice of alumni and friends, communicating, preserving, and perpetuating the heritage of Phillips University. The seminary survives as the Phillips Theological Seminary in Tulsa, Oklahoma, which also houses transcripts for alumni of Phillips University.

The former campus was purchased in June 1999 by Northern Oklahoma College (NOC), a public college, for $6.1 million (split $1.9 million paid by the city of Enid, $800,000 by the Oklahoma State Regents for Higher Education, and $3.4 million by NOC). NOC, based in Tonkawa, Oklahoma, phased the entire property into use as a satellite campus.

=== Presidents ===
- Ely Vaughan Zollars (1907–1915)
- Isaac Newton McCash (1916–1938)
- Eugene S. Briggs (1938–1961)
- Hallie G. Gantz (1961–1972)
- Thomas E. Broce (1973–1975)
- Samuel E. Curl (1976–1979)
- Joe Robert Jones (1979–1988)
- Robert D. Peck (1989–1993)
- Donald F. Heath (1994–1995)
- Sheldon E. Elliott (1995–1996)
- G. Curtis Jones (1996–1998)

== Athletics ==
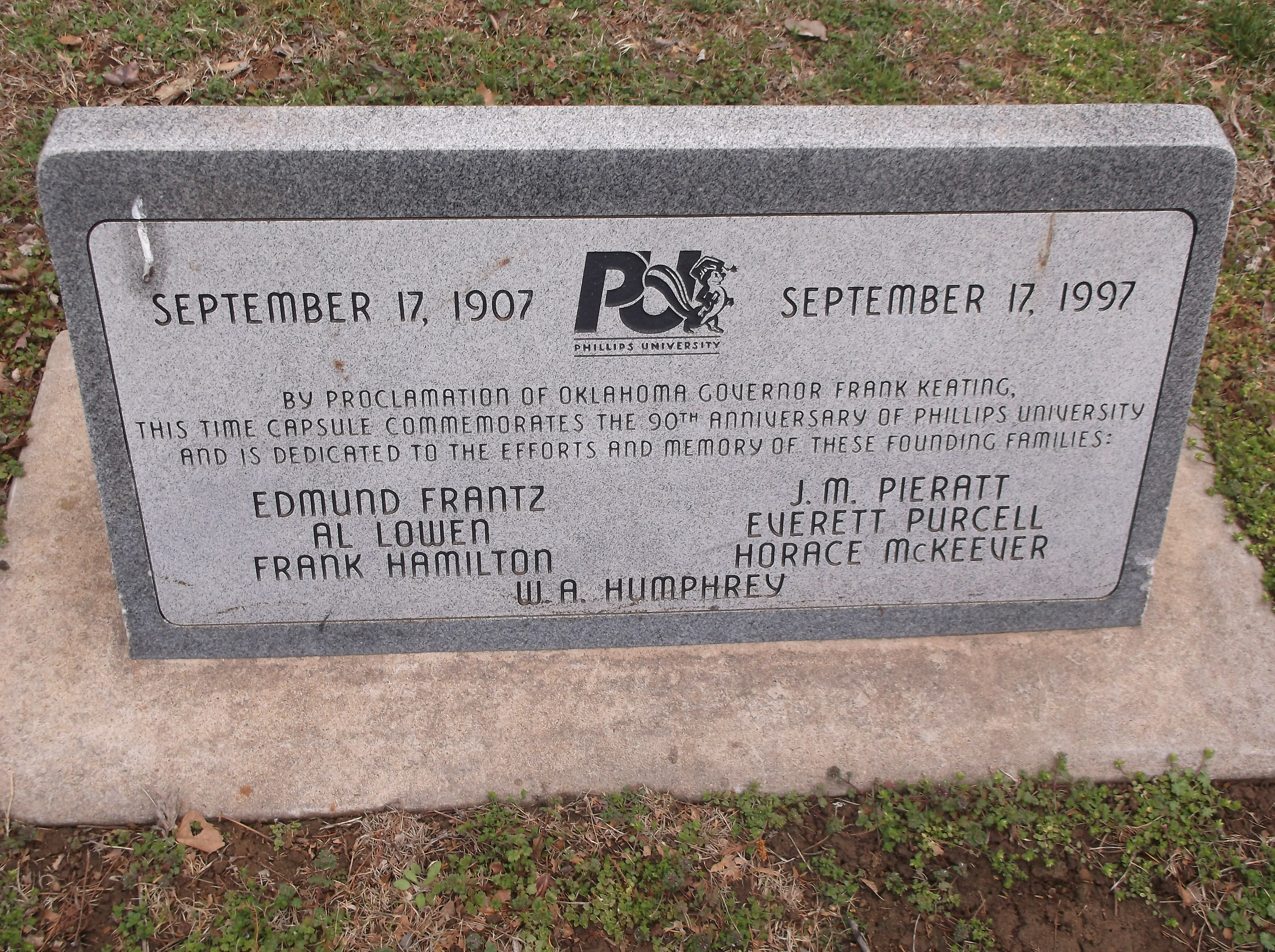
Phillips University time capsule

The school's sports teams were called the Haymakers. For one year, 1920, the school was a member of the Southwest Athletic Conference. Between 1917 and 1920, John Maulbetsch was the head football coach at Phillips University. Maulbetsch was an All-American running back at the University of Michigan in 1914, where he earned the nickname the "Human Bullet". With his name recognition, he was able to recruit big-name talent to Phillips, including future Pro Football Hall of Famer Steve Owen, and future United States Olympic Committee President Doug Roby. Maulbetsch quickly turned Phillips into a major contender in the southwest, as his teams beat Oklahoma and Texas and lost only one game in the 1918 and 1919 seasons. The 1919 team, known as "Mauley's Iron Men", was considered by many experts to be the finest football squad in the southwest that season.

After defeating the Oklahoma and Texas football teams, the "Haymakers" gained a reputation as “one of the strongest teams in the southwest.” When Phillips defeated Texas 10–0 in Austin, Texas in October 1919, the Longhorns had not lost a game since 1917. One Texas newspaper reported that Phillips had "whitewashed the Longhorns in their own corral."

As a result of Phillips' success, it was admitted to the Southwest Conference for the 1920 season. With the loss of several key players from the previous squads, Phillips fell to 4–5–1 record, failed to score a single point in conference play and immediately dropped out of the conference. Maulbetsch was hired to coach Oklahoma A&M in 1921. Unable to sustain its previous success, the program's reputation faded; the school finally closed the program in 1933.

Subsequently, Phillips University baseball and basketball teams were in the NAIA. From 1952 through 1981, Phillips University baseball teams dominated their division. Coached by Dr. Joe Record during this period, the Haymakers compiled a 648–294 record for a .688 winning percentage. Three of Record's teams went to the NAIA World Series. He was the NAIA Coach of the Year in 1973, and inducted into the NAIA Hall of Fame in 1975.

== Phillips University Japan ==
In 1989 Phillips University opened a 12 acres (4.9 ha) branch campus at the Kyoto Institute of Technology and Science in Japan. Students at the Japanese campus earned credits towards a Phillips degree, and were required to complete a one-year residency on the Enid campus. Faculty members from the Enid campus taught some classes in Japan. The arrangement also allowed students from the Enid campus to earn part of their required credits abroad at the Osaka campus. In 1992 Phillips University filed suit against Phillips Japan Co., Ltd, the private entity which ran its academic programs in Japan, along with the Kyoto Institute of Technology and Science, and Tanezo Yamasaki, chief director of the institute. The suit alleged that the defendants failed to pay taxes to the Japanese government, withheld funds due to Phillips University to pay some taxes which they were responsible for paying according to the contract, and alleged unauthorized use of the Phillips University name. In April 1995, Phillips University International (PUI) was created with the new purpose of taking American education in Japan a step further by creating a new bilingual and bicultural academic program. In the fall of 1996, PUI moved its campus to a growing suburban area of Kyoto Prefecture, Kyotanabe City, and became an independent educational entity under the new name of Kyoto International University.

== Notable people ==
=== Alumni ===
- Joseph Bunn – professional basketball player
- Theresa Druley Black - poet
- Merwin Coad – U.S. Representative from Iowa
- Athie Sale Davis - poet
- Pete Earley – journalist and author
- Beverly Roberts Gaventa – New Testament exegete and theologian
- Harold Hamm – businessman/entrepreneur
- Carol Hamilton - Oklahoma Poet Laureate (1995–1997)
- Michael Hedges – musician
- Shirley Knight – actress
- Julie Ledgerwood – chief of the Clinical Trials Program at the Vaccine Research Center of the National Institute of Allergy and Infectious Diseases, led first human trial to test the Ebola vaccine
- John Levi – professional football player
- Pat Moran McCoy – jazz pianist
- John Newbold "Happy" Camp – U.S. Representative from Oklahoma
- Daniel Nicholson – legal research and writing professor
- Bill Owen – professional football player
- Steve Owen – professional football coach
- Susan Pamerleau, retired United States Air Force major general and the Republican sheriff of Bexar County
- Oral Roberts – televangelist
- Doug Roby – U.S. Olympic Committee president
- Lawrence Schovanec - Texas Tech University president
- Paul F. Sharp - professor and college administrator
- Everett Shelton – University of Wyoming basketball coach
- Jim Spainhower – Missouri State Treasurer
- Henry E. Stubbs – U.S. Representative from California
- Harold Taft – television meteorologist
- Bess Truitt - Oklahoma Poet Laureate (1945–1963)
- John Turner – professional basketball player
- James W. Valentine – paleontologist
- Bill Williams – journalist
- George H. Wilson – U.S. Representative from Oklahoma

=== Faculty ===
- Bill Quayle, tennis coach and associate professor from 1972 to 1979; left to become athletics director at Emporia State University from 1979 to 1999.
