= Cyril, Oklahoma =

Town in Oklahoma, US

- Town
- Seal

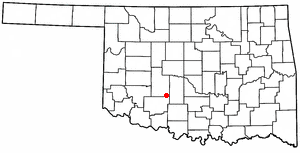
- Location of Cyril, Oklahoma
- Coordinates: 34°53′55″N 98°12′11″W
- Country: United States
- State: Oklahoma
- County: Caddo

Area
  - Total: 0.57 sq mi (1.48 km^{2})
  - Land: 0.57 sq mi (1.48 km^{2})
  - Water: 0 sq mi (0.00 km^{2})
- Elevation: 1,371 ft (418 m)

Population (2020)
  - Total: 827
  - Density: 1,443.2/sq mi (557.23/km^{2})
- Time zone: UTC-6 (Central (CST))
  - Summer (DST): UTC-5 (CDT)
- ZIP code: 73029
- Area code: 580
- FIPS code: 40-19000
- GNIS feature ID: 2412400

Cyril is a town in Caddo County, Oklahoma, United States. As of the 2020 census, Cyril had a population of 827.

== Geography ==
Cyril is located in southeastern Caddo County. U.S. Route 277 passes through the town, leading northeast 23 miles (37 km) to Chickasha and southwest 28 miles (45 km) to Lawton. Oklahoma City is 66 miles (106 km) to the northeast via US 277 and Interstate 44.

According to the United States Census Bureau, Cyril has a total area of 0.58 square miles (1.5 km^{2}), all land.

== Utilities ==
Telephone, Internet, and Digital TV Services is provided by Hilliary Communications.

== Demographics ==
Historical population
Census	Pop.	Note	%±
1920	386		—
1930	922		138.9%
1940	972		5.4%
1950	998		2.7%
1960	1,284		28.7%
1970	1,302		1.4%
1980	1,220		−6.3%
1990	1,072		−12.1%
2000	1,168		9.0%
2010	1,059		−9.3%
2020	827		−21.9%
U.S. Decennial Census

=== 2020 census ===
As of the 2020 census, Cyril had a population of 827. The median age was 37.7 years. 25.2% of residents were under the age of 18 and 14.9% of residents were 65 years of age or older. For every 100 females there were 94.1 males, and for every 100 females age 18 and over there were 95.3 males age 18 and over.

0.0% of residents lived in urban areas, while 100.0% lived in rural areas.

There were 353 households in Cyril, of which 39.9% had children under the age of 18 living in them. Of all households, 40.8% were married-couple households, 24.1% were households with a male householder and no spouse or partner present, and 30.0% were households with a female householder and no spouse or partner present. About 29.7% of all households were made up of individuals and 10.2% had someone living alone who was 65 years of age or older.

There were 451 housing units, of which 21.7% were vacant. The homeowner vacancy rate was 5.3% and the rental vacancy rate was 18.2%.

Racial composition as of the 2020 census
Race	Number	Percent
White	584	70.6%
Black or African American	9	1.1%
American Indian and Alaska Native	103	12.5%
Asian	2	0.2%
Native Hawaiian and Other Pacific Islander	2	0.2%
Some other race	21	2.5%
Two or more races	106	12.8%
Hispanic or Latino (of any race)	79	9.6%

=== 2000 census ===
As of the census of 2000, there were 1,168 people, 438 households and 307 families residing in the town. The population density was 2,028.6 inhabitants per square mile (783.2/km^{2}). There were 523 housing units at an average density of 908.3 per square mile (350.7/km^{2}). The racial makeup of the town was 87.16% White, 0.17% African American, 9.42% Native American, 0.17% Asian, 0.51% from other races, and 2.57% from two or more races. Hispanic or Latino of any race were 2.74% of the population.

There were 438 households, of which 34.2% had children under the age of 18 living with them, 53.2% were married couples living together, 13.2% had a female householder with no husband present, and 29.9% were non-families. 28.3% of all households were made up of individuals, and 16.0% had someone living alone who was 65 years of age or older. The average household size was 2.55 and the average family size was 3.14.

In the town, the population was spread out, with 29.4% under the age of 18, 6.8% from 18 to 24, 25.8% from 25 to 44, 17.0% from 45 to 64, and 21.1% who were 65 years of age or older. The median age was 35 years. For every 100 females, there were 84.8 males. For every 100 females age 18 and over, there were 76.7 males.

The median income for a household in the town was $27,772, and the median income for a family was $33,750. Males had a median income of $29,500 versus $16,563 for females. The per capita income for the town was $14,227. About 16.6% of families and 20.5% of the population were below the poverty line, including 30.7% of those under age 18 and 10.6% of those age 65 or over.

== History ==
On August 25, 1901, Louise (probably called Cyril) Lookingglass, the infant daughter of Bayard (Monapahrah) and Laura (Tit-tah-ter-way) Lookingglass, was allotted 160 acres (0.65 km^{2}) of land that would become the Cyril townsite. Louise Lookingglass died in 1903. Bayard Lookingglass sold one-half of the allotment to Mr. and Mrs. Pierson on July 26, 1907. The Piersons sold the land to the Cyril Townsite and Development Company on September 10, 1907.

Although there is some dispute, the Cyril Station appears to have been named circa 1902 after Bayard and Laura Lookingglasses' daughter when they granted the railroad permission to build a section house next to the railroad stop. Some believed that the town of Cyril was named after the Cyril Station of the St. Louis-San Francisco Railroad. However a diligent search of all sources including Frisco Railroad, found no supporting evidence.

The townsite was surveyed, plotted out and dedicated in September 1907. Construction began in early 1908 and by April there were 200 inhabitants, 3 hardware stores, 3 grocery stores, a general tin and pump house, restaurant, rooming house, pool hall, two barber shops, blacksmith shop, lumberyard, feed yard and feed mill.

The town was the site of an oil refinery from the early 1920s until it was closed in 1984. During that time, the refinery was operated by Anderson-Prichard Refining, APCO, and later Oklahoma Refining. It was the major economic driver for the town, employing 160 people at the time of closure. An unsuccessful attempt was made in the early 1990s to restart part of the refinery. As of 2010, the refinery had been demolished and the site was a Superfund environmental cleanup site.

== Notable people ==
- Jay Snider - Poet Laureate of Oklahoma (2023-2024)
