= Joe Kreger =

American poet

Joe Russel Kreger (born 1939 in Tonkawa, Oklahoma) served twice as poet laureate of the American state of Oklahoma. He was previously appointed in 1998 after the death of Betty Shipley, and reappointed in 2021. Kreger was the first poet laureate of the state to be considered primarily a "cowboy poet", preceding Eddie Wilcoxen (2011–2012) and Jay Snider (2023-2024). Born in Tonkawa, Oklahoma, Kreger has spent most of his life as a rancher.

His poems have been published as Lookin' at Life (1997, Innovative Broadcast Corp) and Still Lookin' (2000, Doane Agricultural Service).

== Early life ==
Joe Kreger was born in Tonkawa, Oklahoma. His father was a medical doctor who served in the U.S. Army during World War II. Kreger earned a bachelor's degree in animal science in 1961 and a master's in agricultural education in 1968 from Oklahoma State University. He served in the U.S. Army Reserves, worked for Redbud Hereford Ranch, taught at Northern Oklahoma College, and then founded his own ranch, Kreger Ranch.

== Works ==
=== Collections ===
- Lookin' at Life Innovative Broadcast Corp. 1997.
- Still Lookin' Doane Agricultural Service. 2000.

=== Publications ===
The High Plains Journal has published numerous poems by Kreger:

- Kreger, Joe, "The Road Still Runs Both Ways" High Plains Journal, December 3, 2018.
- Kreger, Joe, "Neighborin'" High Plains Journal, November 19, 2018.
- Kreger, Joe, "Labels" High Plains Journal, November 5, 2018.
- Kreger, Joe, "Headgear" High Plains Journal, October 15, 2018.
- Kreger, Joe, "Grandpa’s Barn" High Plains Journal, October 1, 2018.
- Kreger, Joe, "In the Winds" High Plains Journal, September 17, 2018.
- Kreger, Joe, "Workin' Slow" High Plains Journal, September 3, 2018.
- Kreger, Joe, "Investing" High Plains Journal, August 20, 2018.
- Kreger, Joe, "Maturity" High Plains Journal, August 6, 2018.
- Kreger, Joe, "Roy" High Plains Journal, July 16, 2018.
- Kreger, Joe, "Jackrabbits" High Plains Journal, July 2, 2018.
- Kreger, Joe, "A People Living Free" High Plains Journal, June 18, 2018.
- Kreger, Joe, "The Race" High Plains Journal, June 4, 2018.
- Kreger, Joe, "Fifty-six" High Plains Journal, May 21, 2018.
- Kreger, Joe, "Switchin' Positions" High Plains Journal, (S.P.) May 7, 2018.
- Kreger, Joe, "Pet?" High Plains Journal, April 16, 2018.
- Kreger, Joe, "His Time" High Plains Journal, April 2, 2018.
- Kreger, Joe, "That Little Hometown Cafe" High Plains Journal, March 19, 2018.
- Kreger, Joe, "Calvin'" High Plains Journal, Time March 5, 2018.
- Kreger, Joe, "Food" High Plains Journal, February 19, 2018.
- Kreger, Joe, "Ice Storm" High Plains Journal, February 5, 2018.
- Kreger, Joe, "Cold Back" High Plains Journal, January 15, 2018.
- Kreger, Joe, "Grandpa’s Barn" High Plains Journal, January 1, 2018.
- Kreger, Joe, "Cows don't know it's Christmas" High Plains Journal, December 18, 2017.
- Kreger, Joe, "When Bud left home" High Plains Journal, December 4, 2017.
- Kreger, Joe, "Try" High Plains Journal, November 20, 2017.
- Kreger, Joe, "The Wall" High Plains Journal, November 6, 2017.
- Kreger, Joe, "Walkin’ Home" High Plains Journal, October 16, 2017.
- Kreger, Joe, "Checkin’ Heats" High Plains Journal, October 2, 2017.
- Kreger, Joe, "The Seat of Wisdom" High Plains Journal, September 18, 2017.
- Kreger, Joe, "Death Loss" High Plains Journal, September 4, 2017.
- Kreger, Joe, "The Overcomer" High Plains Journal, August 21, 2017.
- Kreger, Joe, "The Lowly Sandbur" High Plains Journal, August 7, 2017.
- Kreger, Joe, "The Donkey and Me" High Plains Journal, July 17, 2017.
- Kreger, Joe, "That Gremlin in My Shed" High Plains Journal, July 3, 2017.
- Kreger, Joe, "The Cowboy Hall of Fame" High Plains Journal, June 19, 2017.
- Kreger, Joe, "Small Pleasures" High Plains Journal, June 5, 2017.
- Kreger, Joe, "The City" High Plains Journal, May 15, 2017.
- Kreger, Joe, "Sellin' Out" High Plains Journal, April 25, 2017.
- Kreger, Joe, "Shoppin' Trip" High Plains Journal, April 17, 2017.
- Kreger, Joe, "Sarah’s Babies" High Plains Journal, April 3, 2017.
- Kreger, Joe, "Second Thoughts" High Plains Journal, March 20, 2017.
- Kreger, Joe, "Gettin’ Away" High Plains Journal, March 6, 2017.
- Kreger, Joe, "Elementary Education" High Plains Journal, February 20, 2017.
- Kreger, Joe, "Options" High Plains Journal, February 6, 2017.
- Kreger, Joe, "The Gift of Light" High Plains Journal, January 10, 2017.
- Kreger, Joe, "The Epitaph" High Plains Journal, January 2, 2017.
- Kreger, Joe, "The Drifter" High Plains Journal, December 19, 2016.
- Kreger, Joe, "Speed" High Plains Journal, December 5, 2016.
- Kreger, Joe, "Smooth Mouthed" High Plains Journal, November 21, 2016.
- Kreger, Joe, "In My Mind’s Eye" High Plains Journal, November 15, 2016.

== See also ==
- Poets Laureate of Oklahoma
