= Jay Snider =

Jay Snider may refer to:

- Jay T. Snider, American former NHL executive
- Jay Snider (poet), poet laureate of Oklahoma
