= Native ground =

Native ground may also refer to:

- Native Ground, a 1979 poem by Robert Minhinnick
- On Native Ground: Memoirs and Impressions, an autobiography by Jim Barnes
- On Native Grounds, a 1942 literary work by Alfred Kazin
