= Jeanetta Calhoun Mish =

American poet

- Born: 1961 (age 64–65); Hobart, Oklahoma, U.S.
- Education: University of Texas Permian Basin; University of Oklahoma
- Writing career
- Genre: Poetry

Jeanetta Calhoun Mish (born 1961) is an American poet and served as Oklahoma's twenty-first poet laureate.

== Biography ==
Born in Hobart, Oklahoma, in 1961, Mish was educated at the University of Houston, the University of Texas of the Permian Basin, and the University of Oklahoma, where she earned her doctorate in 2009. She is a faculty member in the Red Earth MFA in creative writing at Oklahoma City University, which she also serves as program director. Mish is the founder and editor of Mongrel Empire Press, based in Norman, Oklahoma. She edited the 2011 anthology Ain't Nobody Can Sing like Me: New Oklahoma Writing which also features a poem by fellow Oklahoma Poet Laureate Nathan Brown. She has taught writing workshops on family stories and poetry composition for teenagers. She has performed her poetry in many locations, including the Woody Guthrie Folk Festival, Tulsa Literary Festival, Oklahoma City University, and Oklahoma State University at Tulsa.

== Awards ==
- 2002 Edda Poetry Chapbook Competition for Women for Tongue-Tied Woman
- 2010 Oklahoma Book Award for Work Is Love Made Visible
- 2010 National Cowboy & Western Museum’s Western Heritage Award for Work Is Love Made Visible
- 2010 WILLA Literary Award for Poetry for Work Is Love Made Visible
- Wrangler Award for Work Is Love Made Visible

== Works ==
- Tongue-Tied Woman (Soulspeak, 2001)
- Work Is Love Made Visible (West End Press, 2009)
- Ain't Nobody That Can Sing like Me: New Oklahoma Writing, ed. (Mongrel Empire Press, 2010)
- Oklahomeland: Essays (Lamar University Press, 2015)
- What I Learned at the War (West End Press, 2016)

== See also ==
- Poets Laureate of Oklahoma
