= Freeman Edwin Miller =

Freeman Edwin Miller (May 19, 1864 – July 8, 1951) was an American poet, lawyer, newspaper editor, professor, and district court judge.

== Early life ==
Freeman Edwin Miller was born May 19, 1864, near Newtown, Indiana. He attended DePauw University from 1881 to 1890. Miller began teaching at the age of 16 while attending university courses. Upon graduation with his Bachelor of Arts in 1887 he was valedictorian. He received his Master of Arts in 1890, and relocated to Stillwater, Oklahoma.

== Writing career ==
In 1886 Miller edited the Veedersburg Indiana Courier, and in 1887 he edited the Canadian Texas Crescent. He was the publisher and editor for the Stillwater Advance and Daily Democrat in 1905. In 1906 and 1907 was the publisher for the Stillwater Progress. He wrote the column "Oklahoma Sunshine" for the Daily Oklahoman from 1905 to 1917. His 1904-1905 "Oklahoma Sunshine" column from the Stillwater Advance which was later collected into a book of the same title. Miller was an English literature professor from 1894 to 1898 and 1915 to 1916 at OSU in Stillwater, Oklahoma, then called the Agricultural and Mechanical College. He chaired the English department beginning in 1894. Miller was considered the territorial poet laureate of Oklahoma. C.W. Moulton published Oklahoma and Other Poems in 1895, and the Knickerbocker Press published Songs from the Southwest Country in 1898. He performed his poetry at the 1904 St. Louis World's Fair. His poem "The Builders" was read by the clerk at the Oklahoma state constitutional convention. His epic poem, "Oklahoma: An Ode," was read at the 1915 Panama-Pacific International Exposition in San Francisco.

== Legal career ==
In 1889 Miller was elected district attorney for Texas' 31st Judicial District in Canadian, Texas. Miller filed suit against Payne County for unpaid attorney's fees, and the case was the first to be appealed to the Oklahoma State Supreme Court in 1907. A proponent of alcohol prohibition, in 1892 Miller was president of the Stillwater branch of the Christian Temperance Union, and upon statehood helped to write the Oklahoma's Prohibition Enforcement Act. He was the secretary at the 1894 Democratic Statehood Convention of Oklahoma held in Perry, Oklahoma. In 1932 Oklahoma Governor William H. Murray appointed him district judge for Oklahoma's 11th District Court, and he served until 1936.

== Personal life ==
In 1914 Miller married Ada M. Kelly. He died on July 8, 1951, at the age of 87.

== Works ==
- Oklahoma and Other Poems C. W. Moulton. 1895.
- Songs from the Southwest Country The Knickerbocker Press. 1898.
- Oklahoma Sunshine The Advance Printing Company. 1905.
- The Founding of Oklahoma Agricultural and Mechanical College Hinkel & Sons. 1928.
