= Della Ione Young =

American poet

Della Iona Cann Young
- Born: Della Iona Cann; February 8, 1872; Holton, Kansas
- Died: May 16, 1945 (aged 73); Elk City, Oklahoma
- Burial place: Cheyenne Cemetery
- Occupations: Poet, educator
- Known for: Poet Laureate of Oklahoma
- Spouse: Andrew Clyde Young
- Children: Three

Della Iona Cann Young (1872-1945) was Oklahoma's fourth poet laureate, appointed in 1943 by Governor Robert S. Kerr.

Young was born Della Iona Cann in Holton, Kansas on February 8, 1872. She married Andrew Clyde Young in 1906 and they had three children. At the time of her appointment as poet laureate, Young had published only two poems, and she never published a volume of poetry.

Most of Young's career was spent as an educator in Western Oklahoma.

According to her gravestone, she died May 16, 1945 in Elk City, Oklahoma.

== See also ==
- Poets Laureate of Oklahoma
