= Richard Jordan (American football) =

American football player (born 1974)

No. 99
- Position: Linebacker

Personal information
- Born: December 1, 1974 (age 51); Holdenville, Oklahoma, U.S.
- Listed height: 6 ft 1 in (1.85 m)
- Listed weight: 252 lb (114 kg)

Career information
- High school: Vian (Vian, Oklahoma)
- College: Missouri Southern (1993–1996)
- NFL draft: 1997: 7th round, 239th overall pick

Career history
- Detroit Lions (1997–1999); Kansas City Chiefs (2001–2002)*; Detroit Lions (2002)
- * Offseason or practice squad member only

Awards and highlights
- 2× MIAA Defensive Player of the Year (1995–1996)

Career NFL statistics
- Tackles: 13
- Interceptions: 1
- Stats at Pro Football Reference

Richard Lamont Jordan (born December 1, 1974) is an American former professional football player who was a linebacker for four seasons with the Detroit Lions of the National Football League (NFL). He was selected by the Lions in the seventh round of the 1997 NFL draft after playing college football for the Missouri Southern Lions.

== Early life and college ==
Richard Lamont Jordan was born on December 1, 1974, in Holdenville, Oklahoma. He attended Vian High School in Vian, Oklahoma.

Jordan was a four-year letterman for the Missouri Southern Lions of Missouri Southern State College from 1993 to 1996. He posted eight sacks in 1995, earning Mid-America Intercollegiate Athletics Association (MIAA) Co-Defensive Player of the Year honors. He recorded 136 tackles as a senior in 1996, garnering MIAA Defensive Player of the Year recognition. Jordan finished his college career with 406 tackles and 20 sacks. He was inducted into the school's athletics hall of fame in 2006.

== Professional career ==
Jordan was selected by the Detroit Lions in the seventh round, with the 239th overall pick, of the 1997 NFL draft. He officially signed with the team on May 22. He was released on August 25 and signed to the practice squad on August 27. Jordan was promoted to the active roster on September 27 and played in ten games during the 1997 season. He also appeared in one playoff game that year. He played in all 16 games, starting four, for the Lions in 1998 and recorded one interception. Jordan appeared in nine games in 1999, posting eight solo tackles and four assisted tackles, before being placed on injured reserve on November 17, 1999. He became a free agent after the 1999 season and re-signed with Detroit on April 5, 2000. He was released on August 27, 2000.

Jordan signed with the Kansas City Chiefs in 2001. He was later released on September 2, 2001. He signed with the Chiefs again on January 30, 2002, but was released again on September 1, 2002.

Jordan was signed by the Detroit Lions on October 2, 2002. He played in one game for the Lions, posting one solo tackle, before being placed on injured reserve on October 22, 2002. He became a free agent after the 2002 season.

== Personal life ==
Jordan's son, Richard Jordan Jr., also played football at Missouri Southern.
