= Anne Semple =

American poet

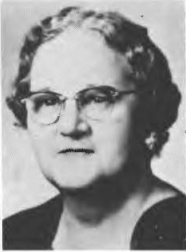
- Born: June 9, 1900; Caddo, Oklahoma, U.S.
- Died: October 25, 1987 (aged 87); Oklahoma, U.S.
- Other name: Ann Semple
- Occupations: Writer, poet, college professor
- Known for: 5th Poet Laureate of Oklahoma
- Relatives: Peter Pitchlynn (great-grandfather)

Anne Ruth Semple (June 9, 1900 – October 25, 1987), sometimes written Ann Semple, was a Native American writer and professor. She was the fifth poet laureate of the state of Oklahoma, appointed in 1944. She taught at Southeastern Oklahoma State University from 1947 to 1965.

== Early life and education ==
Semple was born in Caddo, Oklahoma, the daughter of Charles Alexander Semple and Minnie E. Pitchlynn Semple. She was an enrolled member of the Choctaw nation, and the great-granddaughter of Peter Pitchlynn (Snapping Turtle), who served as chief of the Choctaw nation in the 1860s. Her brother William Finley Semple was chief of the Choctaw nation from 1918 to 1922, and served in the Oklahoma legislature.

Semple attended high school at the Oklahoma Presbyterian College. She earned a bachelor's degree in 1933 at Southeastern State College. She pursued further studies at Austin College in Texas, where she wrote a master's thesis on Native American folklore in Oklahoma. She completed doctoral studies at Oklahoma Agricultural and Mechanical College, (now Oklahoma State University), with a 1955 dissertation on the history of Oklahoma Presbyterian College.

== Career ==
Semple was the fifth poet laureate of Oklahoma, appointed in 1944 by Governor Robert S. Kerr. She was the first Native American writer to hold the position of Poet Laureate in any U.S. state. She was a member of the Oklahoma Poetry Society, Sigma Tau Delta, the Oklahoma Writers' Club, the Oklahoma Educational Association, Phi Alpha Theta, Delta Kappa Gamma, the Ohoyohoma Club, and the California Federation of Chaparral Poets.

Semple was a professor of education at Southeastern Oklahoma State University from at least 1947 until 1965. She spoke about her work to community groups.

== Publications ==
- "One of Many" (1931, essay)
- Prairie-Born: A Book of Verse (1942)
- "Christian Leaders Developed at Oklahoma Presbyterian College" (1946)
- Ties that Bind: The Story of Oklahoma Presbyterian College (1957)

== Personal life and legacy ==
Semple died in 1987, at the age of 87, in Oklahoma. Her grave is in Gethsemane Cemetery in Caddo, Oklahoma. Her papers are in the collection of the Oklahoma Historical Society. The Semple Family Museum of Native American Art at Southeastern Oklahoma State University is named for her family. Her great-niece Jane Semple Umsted is an artist who was appointed to the board of trustees of the Institute of American Indian Arts in 2023.

== See also ==
- Poets Laureate of Oklahoma
