= Jennie Harris Oliver =

American poet

Jennie Harris Oliver (March 18, 1864 – June 3, 1942) was an American writer.

Born in Lowell, Michigan, Oliver became a school teacher and moved to Oklahoma in 1892. She was the poet laureate of Oklahoma from 1940 to her death in 1942. Her poems appeared in nationally circulated magazines such as Woman's World and Good Housekeeping, and her "Mokey Delano" stories were adapted by Metro-Goldwyn-Mayer into the 1942 film Mokey, starring Donna Reed, Robert Blake, and Billie Thomas. Oliver was extremely popular among Oklahoma writers and attracted many fellow authors to visit her at her home. She died in Oklahoma City on June 3, 1942.

== See also ==
- Poets Laureate of Oklahoma
