= Violet McDougal =

American poet (1893–1989)

- Born: 1893; Tennessee, U.S.
- Died: 1989 (aged 95–96)
- Education: University of Oklahoma; University of Missouri; Columbia University
- Occupation: Poet

Violet McDougal (1893–1989) was an American poet. She was the first poet laureate of the state of Oklahoma, serving from 1923 to 1931.

== Biography ==
McDougal was born in Tennessee, 1893. She attended the University of Oklahoma, the University of Missouri, and Columbia University. She went on to publish poems in The New York Times as well as in The Daily Oklahoman. McDougal was appointed by Governor Jack C. Walton in 1923. Her book, Wandering Fires: Poems (with her sister, Mary McDougal) was published in Boston by Stratford, in 1925. McDougal died in 1989.

== See also ==
- Poets Laureate of Oklahoma
