= Phillips Theological Seminary =

Private seminary in Tulsa, Oklahoma

Coordinates: 36°10′05″N 95°52′05″W

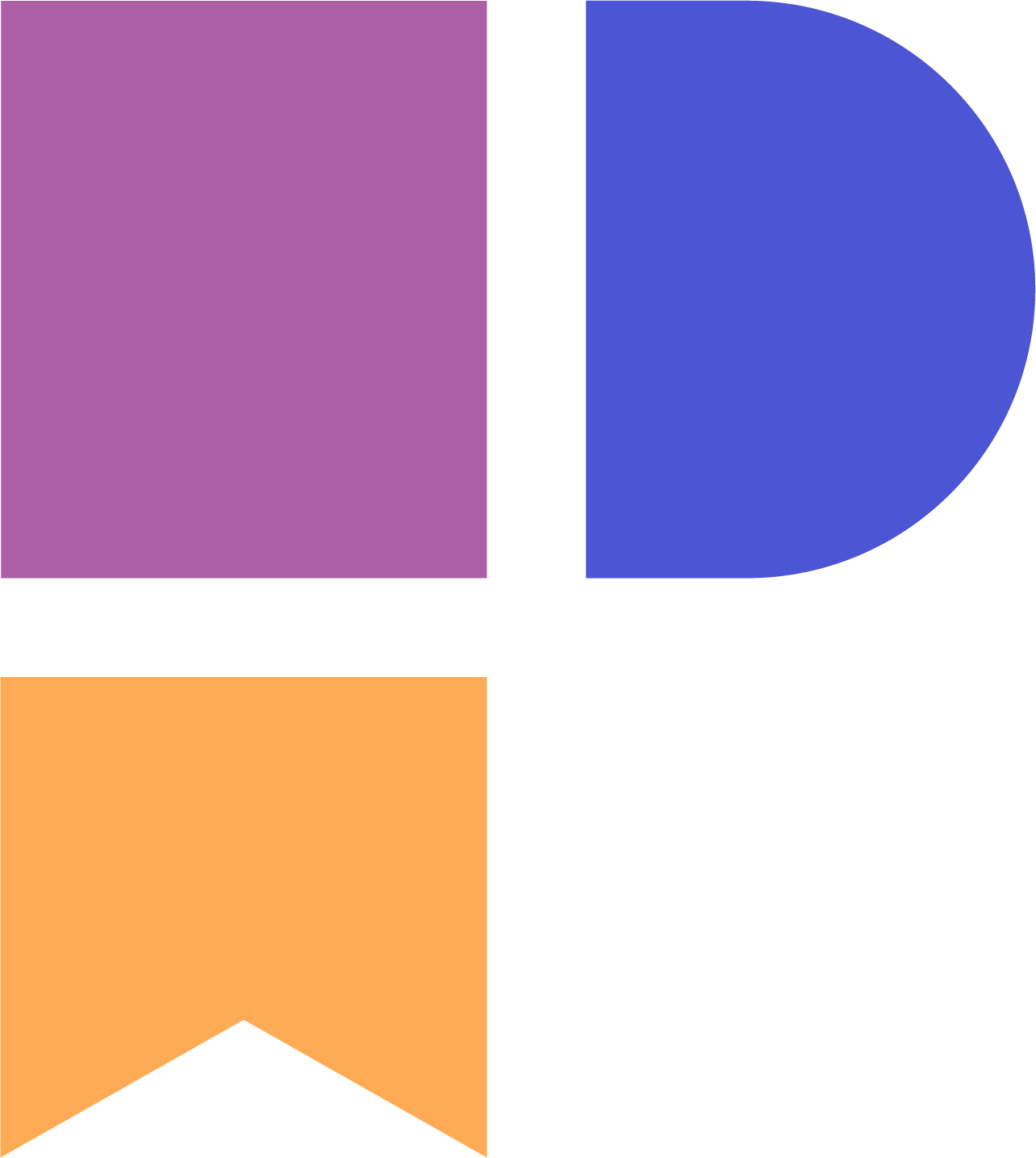
- Former names: College of the Bible of Phillips University; Graduate Seminary of Phillips University; Phillips Graduate Seminary
- Motto: Cultivating Vital Communities, Vital Conversations, and the Public Good
- Type: Private seminary
- Established: 1906 (Founded); 1987 (Incorporated)
- Religious affiliation: Christian Church (Disciples of Christ)
- Endowment: US$175.1 million
- President: Douglas Powe Jr.
- Academic staff: 14 (full time); 33 (total)
- Students: 167 (2021)
- Location: Tulsa, Oklahoma, United States
- Campus: Urban
- Website: ptstulsa.edu

Phillips Theological Seminary is a private seminary affiliated with the Christian Church (Disciples of Christ) and located in Tulsa, Oklahoma. It was established in 1906 and was originally a part of the now defunct Phillips University.

== History ==
The forerunner of Phillips Theological Seminary originated in 1906 as part of Phillips University in Enid, Oklahoma, a liberal arts college and graduate school affiliated with the Christian Church (Disciples of Christ). The Articles of Incorporation for the proposed "Oklahoma Christian University" were executed on October 9, 1906, known as Founders Day. The first classes were held at the College of the Bible of Oklahoma Christian University in Enid, Oklahoma on September 17, 1907. The university changed its name to Phillips University in 1912. In its early years, the seminary was known as the College of the Bible of Phillips University. In 1951, the Association of Theological Schools accredited the seminary, which became known as The Graduate Seminary of Phillips University.

The seminary began offering distance classes in Tulsa by utilizing facilities at local congregations and at the University of Tulsa in 1986. In 1987, Phillips Graduate Seminary incorporated as a freestanding institution independent of Phillips University. The board of trustees voted to change the name to Phillips Theological Seminary in 1995. In 1997, the board of trustees voted to move the seminary to Tulsa. Phillips Theological Seminary acquired its current campus in 2002 when the QuikTrip Corporation donated its former corporate headquarters to the seminary. After extensive renovations, the first classes were held at the 901 N. Mingo Rd., Tulsa, Okla. campus in 2003. Phillips Theological Seminary was approved to offer comprehensive distance education in 2009.

The seminary's namesake, Phillips University, filed Chapter 11 Bankruptcy on April 1, 1998 and closed four months later. It was named for businessman and philanthropist T.W. Phillips of Butler, Pennsylvania, who financed the university in its early years. Phillips Theological Seminary houses the transcripts of the alumni of Phillips University.

== Academics ==
Degrees conferred by the seminary include the Master of Divinity (M.Div.), Master of Theological Studies (MTS), Master of Arts (MA) in Social Justice, Master of Arts in Ministry & Culture, and Doctor of Ministry (D.Min.). Additionally, a wide array of certificates and graduate diplomas are conferred.

In addition to providing pastoral training for the Christian Church (Disciples of Christ), the seminary also provides pastoral training for the Cooperative Baptist Fellowship, Evangelical Lutheran Church in America, Presbyterian Church (USA), Cumberland Presbyterian Church, United Church of Christ, United Methodist Church, and the Unitarian Universalist Association.
