= Delbert Davis =

American poet

Delbert Hugh Davis (1883-1965) was the seventh poet laureate of Oklahoma, appointed in 1963 by Governor Henry Bellmon. Davis was for a time associated with a notable group of writers based in Fallis, Oklahoma. Davis primarily earned his living through farming and ranching, and he self-published his only book, Pipe Dreams, in 1952.

== See also ==
- Poets Laureate of Oklahoma
