= Anderson-Prichard Oil Corporation =

Regional oil refinery and gasoline distributor

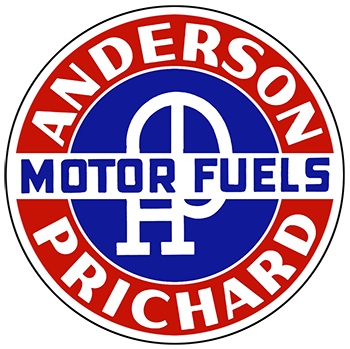
- Industry: petroleum refining and distribution
- Predecessor: Superior Refining Company
- Founded: October 6, 1920
- Defunct: March 31, 1961
- Fate: Sold to investors and became APCO
- Successor: APCO Oil Corporation
- Headquarters: Oklahoma City, Oklahoma, USA
- Area served: Arkansas, Idaho, Illinois, Iowa, Kansas, Minnesota, Missouri, Nebraska, New Mexico, North Dakota, Oklahoma, South Dakota, Texas
- Key people: J. Steve Anderson & Lev H. Prichard
- Products: Kanotex Gasoline, Defiance Oil, Challenge Gasoline, APCO Gasoline
- Number of employees: 852
- Website: Official website

The Anderson-Prichard Oil Corporation (reporting mark: APCO), a regional oil refinery and gasoline distributor, began operation in Oklahoma City, Oklahoma in 1919, founded by J. Steve Anderson and Lev H. Prichard Sr. The partnership was incorporated as a Delaware corporation on June 30, 1922.

== History ==
Lev H. Prichard Sr., previously had organized the Caddo Petroleum Company in 1918 along with his partners, A.P. Crockett, J.B. Allen, and Walter "W.R." Ramsey. By August 1920, J. Steve Anderson joined the company as vice president, and Lev Prichard was promoted from Vice President to being President. Paul Anderson served as Comptroller. The Anderson and Prichard families owned 63% of the Caddo stock by this time. Due to various setbacks, the Caddo company was eventually shut down and liquidated shortly after June 21, 1921. However, separately from the Caddo company, on October 6, 1920, Anderson-Prichard & Co. ("AP&C") had been incorporated in Delaware, with an authorized capital of 100,000 shares of no par value stock. Although incorporated in Delaware, AP&C maintained its principal offices at the Colcord Building in Oklahoma City. AP&C assumed control of the Cyril Refining Company of Cyril, Oklahoma, but due to poor capitalization and debt that had been taken on to obtain services and equipment, AP&C was liquidated in January 1922.

In June 1922, Anderson and Prichard formed the "APCO Refining Company" (Apco), the Cyril refinery asset. The refinery was operated in the name of the Apco Refining Company until February 26, 1923, when all of the company's stock was sold to the latest business entity of the partners, the Anderson-Prichard Oil Corporation, which had also been separately organized and incorporated in Oklahoma in June 1922, with an authorized capital of 1,000 shares of $100 par value stock.

The Anderson-Prichard company used the "APCO" brand name on a very limited basis, off and on, over the years due to uncertainty regarding having clear trademark rights. Another company had used the mark in the same or related industry designation, so Anderson-Prichard avoided any widespread use, opting instead to use their "Anderson-Prichard" name in combination with other brand names, such as with "Challenge Gasoline" and "Defiance Oil". The Kan-O-Tex gasoline brand name and reporting mark were acquired by the Anderson-Prichard Oil Corporation in October 1953 and were likely continued in use for a while before being replaced by Anderson-Prichard's main brand usage. After companies that had previously used APCO variants had trademarks canceled for non-use, Anderson-Prichard filed a trademark application in 1941. But, in 1943, Anderson-Prichard was informed that the American Oil Company had objected to the application because they felt it was too similar to their "AMOCO" brand name. However, by February 1954, Anderson-Prichard company negotiated an agreement with the American Oil Company that allowed them to use the APCO branding under geographic limitations, and design limitations that would keep the respective companies' logos visually distinct. Anderson-Prichard Oil Corporation would proceed increasingly to brand its products and gas stations with the APCO logo thereafter.

Lev Prichard bought out J. Steve Anderson's stock in the company in 1947. Lev H. Prichard died from cancer in 1949. By 1955, the company was listed on the Fortune 500 based upon $54.7 million in revenues, assets of $55.4 million.

In 1960 the bulk of the company's assets sold for $123.3 million to four investor groups, including Occidental, Seagram, and Brookston Oil. One part which included Anderson-Prichard marketing and distribution units was incorporated in Delaware as a completely new company, named "APCO Oil Corporation".

== Cultural references ==
The Ramsey Tower in Oklahoma City, Oklahoma, completed in 1931, was for a period of time widely referred-to as "APCO Tower", while the Anderson-Prichard Oil Corporation was headquartered there. The building is now known as the "City Place Tower".

The W.S. Kelly Gas Station & General Store was an Anderson-Prichard gas station located in Cogar, Oklahoma, and appeared in a scene in the film, Rain Man, starring Tom Cruise and Dustin Hoffman. The "APCO Petroleum Products" road sign can be seen in the film in a scene where the two protagonists stop to use the phone booth.
