= Jay Snider (poet) =

American poet

Jay Snider is the current poet laureate of Oklahoma, serving from 2023 to 2024. He writes in the cowboy poetry genre. He is the third cowboy poet to be appointed Oklahoma state poet laureate after his predecessors Joe Kreger and Eddie Wilcoxen. He was previously named Lariat Laureate by CowboyPoetry.com in 2001 and Cowboy Poet of the Year by the Academy of Western Artists in 2008. He resides in Cyril, Oklahoma and works as a rancher.

== See also ==
- Poets Laureate of Oklahoma
