= Sequoyah National Wildlife Refuge =

Wildlife refuge in Oklahoma

- IUCN category IV (habitat/species management area)
- Location within the United States
- Location: Haskell, Muskogee, Sequoyah counties, Oklahoma, United States
- Nearest city: Vian, Oklahoma
- Coordinates: 35°26′30″N 95°01′01″W
- Area: 20,800 acres (84 km^{2})
- Established: 1970
- Governing body: U.S. Fish and Wildlife Service
- Website: Sequoya National Wildlife Refuge

Sequoyah National Wildlife Refuge was established in 1970 to provide habitat for waterfowl and other migratory birds and to provide food and cover for resident wildlife. It contains 20,800 acres (8,400 ha) on the western edge of Robert S. Kerr Reservoir in three Oklahoma Counties: Muskogee, Haskell and Sequoyah. The refuge was named in honor of Sequoyah, a Cherokee who developed an alphabet for the Cherokee language.

== Description ==
The refuge's land includes grasslands, bottom lands, river bluffs, and hardwood forests. The refuge manages a cooperative farming project that raises wheat, corn and soybeans on 3,000 acres (1,200 ha). Part of the crops are not harvested each year in order to attract more wildlife. Native animals include bobcat, muskrat, rabbit and deer. Hunting of geese, ducks and small game is allowed in certain areas and seasons. A special permit is required for deer hunting at specified dates.

About half of the refuge is covered by water. This attracts migratory birds such as mallards and snow geese. Fishing, primarily for bass, crappie and catfish, is allowed.

The refuge has issued a list of 256 bird species that have been seen more than twice within its borders. Hence, this is a popular venue for bird watchers. A complete list of bird species can be seen on the U. S. Fish & Wildlife Service Web page for Sequoyah National Wildlife Refuge..

Wildflowers in the refuge attract monarch butterflies during their annual migrations.
