= Paul Kroeger =

Poet Laureate of Oklahoma

- Born: Paul William Kroeger; March 20, 1907
- Died: 1977
- Occupation: Poet
- Writing career
- Genre: Poetry

Paul William Kroeger (1907-1977) was Oklahoma's second poet laureate, appointed in 1931 by Governor William H. Murray. Though his work appeared in periodicals and anthologies, Kroeger never published a volume of poems, and his work is rarely read today.

== See also ==
- Poets Laureate of Oklahoma
