= Rudolph N. Hill =

American poet

Rudolph Nelson Hill (1903–1980) was the eighth poet laureate of Oklahoma, appointed by Governor Henry Bellmon, in 1966. Born in Missouri, Hill was raised in central Oklahoma and lived most of his life in Wewoka. Hill was educated at The University of Oklahoma and worked as a lawyer. In 1970, Hill was a named a Poet Laureate Emeritus by Governor Dewey Bartlett.

== Bibliography ==
Red Ship Wings: Poems. Wewoka, OK: Lasiter, 1929

Whipping-Tree and Wagon-Trails Farewell; America Forever: Poems, 1942

Star of Peace on Trail of Cibola. San Antonio: Nay.or, 1954

Westward Wind and 20th Century Singing Words: Poems, 1959.

Curtain Calls before Curfew, 1962.

Frontiers of Soonerland in Song and Story. Oklahoma City: Adman, 1965.

From Country Lanes to Space Age Dawn. San Antonio: Naylor, 1968.

== See also ==
- Poets Laureate of Oklahoma
