= Bess Truitt =

American poet laureate

Bess Truitt (1884–1972) served as the Oklahoma Poet Laureate from 1945 to 1946. Since no poet laureate was appointed directly after her, Truitt also served as poet laureate emeritus from 1946 to 1963.

== Biography ==
Bess Truitt was born in Madison, Iowa, in 1883. Her family lived briefly in Kansas, and moved to Enid, Oklahoma due to the land run in 1893. She graduated Enid High School in 1901 and obtained her bachelor's and master's degrees from Phillips University. She also attended Valparaiso University and the University of Utah. Prior to becoming the Poet Laureate of Oklahoma, she was employed as a teacher, Garfield County Clerk, travel agent, and for the Department of American Citizenship in Oklahoma.

She released one poetry collection Thistle Down and Prairie Rose (Burton Publishing) in December 1940. Her work was anthologized in the Davis Anthology of Newspaper Verse for 1934, Davis Anthology of Newspaper Verse for 1940, Davis Anthology of Newspaper Verse for 1941, Anthology of Poetry by Oklahoma Writers, and Anthology of the General Federation of Women's Clubs. She edited a newspaper column entitled, "Port o' Poets," Range Rhymes and Recollections, Journal of the Sons and Daughters of the Cherokee Strip, and Red Earth Poetry Magazine. Her work also appeared in Chronicles of Oklahoma, Oklahoma State Senate Journal, Oklahoma Today, and the Enid Morning News.

She served as president of the Enid Writer's Club, the National League of American Pen Women, and the Oklahoma Poetry Society. She was inducted into the Oklahoma Hall of Fame in 1959, and in 1966, received the Pride of the Plainsmen Award by Enid High School.

She died in 1972.

== See also ==
- Poets Laureate of Oklahoma
