= Jack Worthington =

American investment banker (born 1961)

- Born: Jack Rodney Worthington II; November 22, 1961 (age 64); Maverick County, Texas
- Education: The University of Texas; Oklahoma City University; Columbia Business School
- Occupation: Investment banker

Jack Rodney Worthington II (born November 22, 1961) is an American investment banker. In a 2008 article in Vanity Fair, Worthington claimed that his mother confided to him, as a result of the discovery of a genetic illness of his presumed father later in life, that he is the illegitimate son of the thirty-fifth President of the United States, John F. Kennedy.

== Early life and education ==
Worthington was born in Maverick County, Texas, to Jack Rodney Worthington (August 18, 1937 - May 19, 2007) and Mary Evelyn Bibb Worthington (born 1941). He was born on November 22, 1961, exactly 2 years prior to the assassination of John F. Kennedy. He has a younger sister, Nancy, who was born June 4, 1965, exactly three years prior to the assassination of Robert F. Kennedy, who was shot on June 5, 1968, and died on June 6, 1968. Worthington's father was a basketball coach in Houston, Texas. His mother Mary is the niece of Robert Bibb, a county judge who lived in Eagle Pass, Texas, and was a long-time friend and political ally of Lyndon B. Johnson according to documents from the LBJ Library.

Worthington attended high school in Houston where he was a noted basketball player. He scored over 3,000 points and was named High School Athlete of the year in 1981 by the Houston Sportswriters and Sportscasters. He later attended The University of Texas where he was the starting point guard for the basketball team. He subsequently received his accounting degree, with honors, from Oklahoma City University and later received an MBA with a concentration in finance from Columbia Business School in New York.

Worthington later became an investment banker and is the managing partner of The Arundel Group, a boutique investment banking partnership.

== The Bibb Family and Lyndon Johnson ==
According to family and friends, Worthington's mother Mary Evelyn Bibb, was a regular beauty contestant as a young woman, had modeled for the Johnson family at several of the social functions at the LBJ Ranch. She also resembled Jackie Kennedy. Mary Evelyn Bibb owned a framed personal note given to her by Lyndon Johnson which states, "I had a nice talk with your daddy. Your friend, Lyndon." This document is now in the possession of Jack Worthington, along with other White House documents sent by Lyndon Johnson to her father, William Bibb.

The Bibb family had a multi-decade involvement in business and politics in Maverick County, Texas, on the Texas-Mexico border, including liquor distribution and sale of farm machinery. The Frontier State Bank in Eagle Pass, Texas was owned by the Bibbs with Carlos Marcello through his banking associate Herman Beebe. Mary Evelyn Bibb's father, William Bibb, was a personal friend and business partner with former Mexican President Miguel Aleman Valdez. Aleman was also a personal friend of John Kennedy and Joseph Kennedy Sr, having hosted John and Jackie on their Acapulco honeymoon, and later visiting JFK at the White House. Miguel Aleman Valdez also partnered with Meyer Lansky in the liquor distribution business in Mexico. Meyer Lansky and Joseph Kennedy, both power players in the North American liquor distribution business, eventually became known enemies.

== Disclosures by Vanity Fair ==
In 2006, Worthington's father, Jack Worthington, Sr. was dying of the genetic illness Alpha-1 Deficiency. Worthington became concerned that he and his children could be at risk for the disease and asked his mother if he and his children should be tested for Alpha-1 Deficiency. Worthington later said his mother confided to him that neither he nor his children would be at risk for the disease as his biological father was not Jack Worthington, Sr. but President John F. Kennedy.

On February 7, 2008, Vanity Fair magazine disclosed that, for the previous 18 months, they had been investigating whether an unidentified man may be the illegitimate son of John F. Kennedy. On February 13, 2008, The Globe and Mail reported that the man under investigation was Jack Worthington, and that he would not claim to be the son of John F. Kennedy without 100% positive DNA evidence. That DNA evidence is still lacking. In a statement he read to the Globe and Mail, Worthington said,

Part of [Vanity Fair's] research focuses on my mother's paternal family and their history as lifelong political allies of [Lyndon Johnson] in South Texas. That research is related to the rise of LBJ and fall of JFK, which is an extraordinarily sensitive topic to Americans, so caution and analytical rigour are extremely important."

In response to the publication of the Vanity Fair article, an unnamed, anonymous group claiming to be part of Worthington's family, issued a statement denying that Worthington was the son of Kennedy or that Worthington's mother, Mary Evelyn Bibb, had ever met Kennedy or Johnson. This anonymous report also stated Worthington's biological father is Jack Rodney Worthington. Worthington's mother, Mary Evelyn Bibb Worthington, has never personally made a public statement at any time, on any aspect of the matter.

Vanity Fair's genetic testing was initially limited because President Kennedy's DNA could not be obtained. After extensive search efforts, authentic and certified DNA was located at the National Archives and agreement was reached for testing. Soon after, Vanity Fair assigned security personnel for Worthington and a leading public relations firm was engaged. Vanity Fair then made a courtesy call to Senator Ted Kennedy. One week later, Vanity Fair advised Worthington the article would not proceed.

== Subsequent disclosures ==
Genetic experts agree that the statistical probability of Jack Worthington, Sr. being the biological father of Jack Worthington, II is 0%, based on the eye color combinations of Worthington's father (brown), mother (brown), and grandparents (three brown – one blue). Worthington's eye color is hazel (blue green), the same color as President Kennedy's. Worthington also has a similar appearance to President Kennedy. Worthington is approximately the same height, weight, hair color, eye color, facial and body type as President Kennedy, materially different from Jack Worthington, Sr. Kennedy researchers who know Worthington also confirm a striking similarity in personality. Worthington's DNA has been traced by experts to the Wexford area of Ireland where the Kennedy family originates.

Worthington's mother has refused to provide Jack Worthington, Sr's DNA for testing, which would immediately resolve important paternity questions for the public. Worthington's mother refused to speak to Vanity Fair during their research, neither confirming nor denying the question of paternity, or her relationship with President Kennedy.
