= Betty Lou Shipley =

American poet

- Born: Betty Lou Forsythe; July 11, 1931; Edmond, Oklahoma
- Died: March 14, 1998 (aged 66)
- Education: University of Central Oklahoma
- Occupation: Poet laureate of Oklahoma

Betty Lou Shipley (July 11, 1931 – March 14, 1998) was an American poet who served as the twelfth poet laureate of the state of Oklahoma. Shipley's term as laureate was cut short by her death. Along with authoring three books of poetry, Shipley was the poetry editor for Byline Magazine and operator of Full Count Press and, later, Broncho Press.

== Early life ==
Betty Lou Shipley (née Forsythe) was born in Edmond, Oklahoma on July 11, 1931. She lived in Enid, Oklahoma and Duncan, Oklahoma as a child. She graduated from Duncan High School in 1949 and went on to earn a degree in secondary education and a master's in creative studies from the University of Central Oklahoma.

== Awards ==
Her book Someone Say Amen was awarded the 1998 Oklahoma Book Award.

== Works ==
- Called Up Yonder: Poems from the Bible Belt (Cardinal, 1980)
- Somebody Say Amen (By-Line, 1997)
- Meltdown: Poems from the Core (Full Count, 1980)
