= Leslie A. McRill =

American poet

Leslie A. McRill (1886–1982) was the ninth poet laureate of Oklahoma, appointed by Governor Dewey F. Bartlett in 1970. McRill was born in Kansas but lived much of his life in Oklahoma and graduated from the college which is now Oklahoma City University. He also earned a master's degree in French from the University of Southern California.

== Bibliography ==
Tales of the Night Wind. 1945

Saga of Oklahoma; A Poem of Progress and Growth. 1957

Destruction of Awatobi: A Tragedy. 1964

Living Heritage: Poems of Social Concern. 1970

From Day to Day, As Seen Through My Binoculars. 1972

After-Thoughts in My Ninety-Fifth Year. 1982

== See also ==
- Poets Laureate of Oklahoma
