= Kyoto International University =

Coordinates: 34°49′9″N 135°47′3″E

- Established: Founded 1989
- President: Peter Blocksom
- Location: Kyotanabe, Kyoto, Japan
- Website: www.kyotoiu.ac.jp

Kyoto International University (KIU) is a small, Christian, international school located in Kyōtanabe, Kyoto, Japan. KIU is not officially recognized as a university by the Japanese government. Its legal classification in Japan is as a "miscellaneous school" (Kakushu-gakko). Credits earned at KIU are transferable to universities in North America.

== Location ==
Kyoto International University's campus is located in Kyotanabe City which is 50 minutes away from three major locations; Kyoto City, Osaka-Kobe Metropolitan Area, and Nara City.

== Programs ==
Four-year undergraduate program: offering a B.A. Degree in:

- International Studies (International Studies, Japanese Studies, & Japanese Language)
- International Business
- Biology

Two-year undergraduate programs: offering an Associate of Arts Degree in:

== History ==
Kyoto International University was founded in 1989 as Phillips University Japan, affiliated with Phillips University in Enid, Oklahoma, United States. In August 1992, Phillips University sued Phillips Japan Co., Ltd. for missing payments. In April 1995, Phillips University International (PUI) was created with the new purpose of taking American education in Japan a step further by creating a new bilingual and bi-cultural academic program. In the fall of 1996, PUI moved its campus to a growing suburban area of Kyoto Prefecture, Kyotanabe City, and became an independent educational entity under the new name of Kyoto International University.
