= Jim Barnes (writer) =

American writer

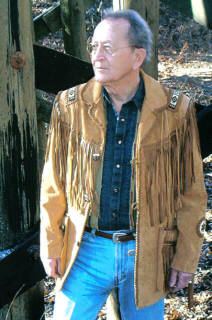
Jim Barnes

Jim Weaver McKown Barnes (born December 22, 1933) is an American writer who was born near Summerfield, Oklahoma (in LeFlore County). He received his BA from Southeastern State University and his MA and Ph.D. from the University of Arkansas. He taught at Truman State University from 1970 to 2003, where he was Professor of Comparative Literature and Writer-in-Residence. After retiring from Truman State, he was Distinguished Professor of English and Creative Writing at Brigham Young University until 2006. On January 15, 2009, Barnes was named Oklahoma Poet Laureate for 2009–2010. He describes his ancestry as "an eighth Choctaw" and "a quarter Welsh".

Barnes is the founding editor of the Chariton Review Press, editor of The Chariton Review from 1975 through 2007, and contributing editor to the Pushcart Prize. He has published over 500 poems in more than 100 journals, and numerous translations. He has sat on several National Endowment for the Arts committees and is Poetry Editor for the Truman State University Press and first-round judge for the T. S. Eliot Prize. Barnes has given scores of readings at college and university campuses, and his work is widely anthologized.

== Awards ==
Barnes received a National Endowment for the Arts Creative Writing Fellowship in 1978 and the Columbia University Translation Award for his translation of Dagmar Nick's Zeugnis und Zeichen (Summons and Signs) in 1980. In 1989, he was awarded the St. Louis Poetry Center's Stanley Hanks Memorial Poetry Award; and, in 1990, he was awarded by the Rockefeller Foundation a Bellagio Residency Fellowship for the purpose of beginning his translations of Dagmar Nick's poetry. He held a second Bellagio Residency Fellowship in 2003. In 1992 he was a Distinguished Writer-in-Residence for the University of Maryland Far East Division. In 1993 Barnes received the Oklahoma Book Award for The Sawdust War, and he was awarded a Senior Fulbright Fellowship to Switzerland in 1993–94. In 1998, On Native Ground: Memoirs and Impressions was named a finalist for the Oklahoma Book Award in non-fiction and also in the poetry category for Paris. In 2007 his poem on the enigma of Weldon Kees' disappearance in The Iowa Review received the Tim McGinnis Prize.

Barnes has been the Featured Poet at the Paris Writers Workshop and at the 13th Franco-Anglais Poetry Translation Festival. In 1995 he was the Munich Translator-in-Residence at Villa Walberta, Germany. In 1996 and 2001 he held two Camargo Foundation Fellowships in Cassis, France, and also in 1996 was the U.S. representative at the Prague Writer's Festival. In 1998 and in 2000, Jim was awarded Academie Schloß Solitude Fellowships in Stuttgart, Germany and received an American Book Award for On Native Ground. In 2002, he was a finalist for the Oklahoma Book Award in the Poetry category for On a Wing of the Sun.

== Books ==
=== Poetry ===
- Sundown Explains Nothing: New and Selected Poems, Stephen F. Austin State University Press, 2019.
- Visiting Picasso, University of Illinois Press, 2007.
- On a Wing of the Sun: Three Volumes of Poetry, University of Illinois Press, 2001.
- Paris: Poems, (Illinois Poetry Series), University of Illinois Press,1997.
- The Sawdust War: Poems, University of Illinois Press, 1992.
- The La Plata Cantata: Poems, Purdue University Press, 1989.
- A Season of Loss, Purdue University Press, 1985.
- American Book of the Dead, University of Illinois Press, 1982.
- The Fish on Poteau Mountain, Cedar Creek Press, 1980.
- This Crazy Land, Inland Boat Series/Porch Press, 1980.
- Five Missouri Poets, (editor), Chariton Review Press, 1979).

=== Translations and criticism ===
- Fiction of Malcolm Lowry and Thomas Mann: Structural Tradition, Thomas Jefferson University Press.
- Summons and Signs: poems, Dagmar Nick (Tr. Jim Barnes) Chariton Review Press.
- Numbered Days: Poems, Dagmar Nick (Tr. Jim Barnes) New Odyssey Press.
- "The Myth of Sisyphus" in Under the Volcano, Prairie Schooner, 42, 341–348. 1968.

=== Prose ===
- On Native Ground: Memoirs and Impressions, American Indian Literature and Critical Studies Series, Vol 23, University of Oklahoma Press.
- "Scars" [Barnes' twentieth short story],New Letters, 2014.
- "Lope Falls", Concho River Review, 2021.

=== Critical studies ===
- A. Robert Lee (ed), The Salt Companion to Jim Barnes, Cambridge, UK: Salt Publishing, 2009.

== See also ==
- Poets Laureate of Oklahoma
