= Carl Allen (tailback) =

American football player (1920–2008)

- Carl Allen, 1947

No. 70
- Position: Tailback

Personal information
- Born: June 25, 1920; Haskell, Oklahoma, U.S.
- Died: November 7, 2008 (aged 88); Benton, Arkansas, U.S.
- Listed height: 6 ft 0 in (1.83 m)
- Listed weight: 175 lb (79 kg)

Career information
- High school: Magnolia (AR)
- College: Ouachita Baptist, Oklahoma City

Career history
- Brooklyn Dodgers (1948)

Career statistics
- Games: 13
- Stats at Pro Football Reference

Carl Blanchard Allen (June 25, 1920 – November 7, 2008) was an American football player who played at the tailback position on both offense and defense. He played college football for Oklahoma City in 1946 and 1947 and professional football for the Brooklyn Dodgers in 1948.

== Early life ==
A native of Haskell, Oklahoma, he attended Magnolia High School in Arkansas.

== College football and military service ==
Allen played one season of college football at Ouachita Baptist University before being called into military service during World War II. After the war, he played at the tailback position for Oklahoma City University and led the 1946 and 1947 Oklahoma City football teams to records of 10–1 and 7–3. Oklahoma City coach Bo Rowland called Allen "the greatest tailback I ever coached . . . the most underrated back in football today."

== Professional football ==
In April 1948, he signed to play professional football in the All-America Football Conference (AAFC) for the New York Yankees. Four months later, the Yankees traded him to the Brooklyn Dodgers, also of the AAFC. He played for the Dodgers during their 1948 season, appearing in 13 games with two interceptions and one touchdown.

== Later life ==
He died in 2008 at age 88.
