= Carl Alexandre =

Deputy Special Representative for the United Nations Stabilization Mission in Haiti

Carl Alexandre is an American lawyer. He was a representative from the United States and was appointed Deputy Special Representative of the United Nations Stabilization Mission in Haiti (MINUSTAH) by the United Nations Secretary-General Ban Ki-moon on 17 January 2013.

Prior to his appointment, Alexandre has been serving as Director of the Office of Overseas Prosecutorial Development, Assistance and Training, Criminal Division oaf the U.S. Department of Justice. In this position, he managed the prosecutorial training and legal system development programs.

From 1994 to 1997, Alexandre worked as Resident Legal Advisor in the U.S. Embassy in Port-au-Prince, Haiti for the U.S. Department of Justice. He was a senior trial attorney of the U.S. Department of Justice in 1989.

== Early life and education ==
Alexandre attended Benjamin N. Cardozo High School. He received a bachelor of arts in government and public administration in 1981 from John Jay College of Criminal Justice and a juris doctor from the Oklahoma City University School of Law.

== Career ==
Alexandre began his career at the United States Department of Justice (DOJ) as a trial attorney in 1989. From 1994 to 1997, he served as Resident Legal Advisor at the U.S. Embassy in Port-au-Prince, Haiti, where he worked on judicial reform and legal assistance initiatives following the restoration of constitutional government in Haiti.

In 2000, Alexandre testified before the United States Congress on issues related to drug trafficking and law enforcement cooperation in Haiti in his capacity as Director of the Office of Overseas Prosecutorial Development, Assistance and Training (OPDAT) within the DOJ Criminal Division.

As director of OPDAT, Alexandre led international prosecutorial assistance programs for the DOJ. In January 2013, United Nations Secretary-General Ban Ki-moon appointed him Deputy Special Representative for the United Nations Stabilization Mission in Haiti (MINUSTAH).

During his tenure with MINUSTAH, Alexandre participated in security-related initiatives in Haiti. Alexandre later served as Executive Director for Partnerships and Planning at INTERPOL. He also served as Counselor for Transnational Organized Crime in the DOJ Criminal Division and was a member of the Senior Executive Service.
