= Poet Laureate of Oklahoma =

- Incumbent; Jay Snider since 2023
- Type: Poet Laureate
- Formation: 1923
- First holder: Violet McDougal

The poet laureate of Oklahoma is the poet laureate for the U.S. state of Oklahoma.

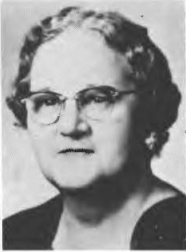
Anne Ruth Semple was poet laureate in 1945.

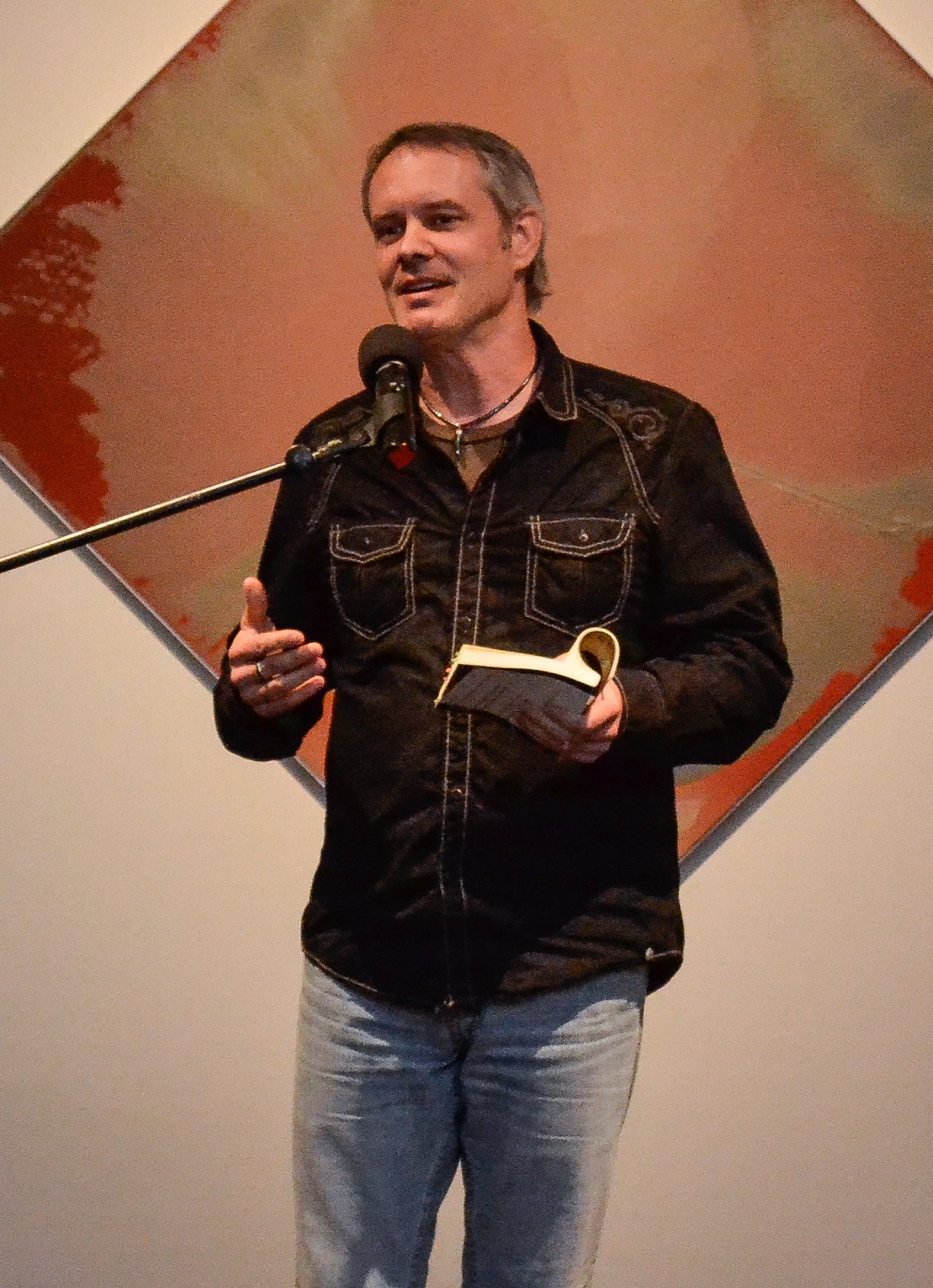
Nathan Brown was poet laureate 2013.

== List of poets laureate ==
- Violet McDougal – 1923–1931
- Paul Kroeger – 1931–1940
- Jennie Harris Oliver – 1940–1942
- Della Ione Young – 1943–1944
- Anne Semple – 1944–1945
- Bess Truitt – 1945–1946
- Delbert Davis – 1963–1965
- Rudolph N. Hill – 1966–1970
- Leslie A. McRill – 1970–1977
- Maggie Culver Fry – 1977–1995
- Carol Hamilton – 1995–1997
- Betty Lou Shipley – 1997–1998
- Joe Kreger – 1998–2001, 2021–2022
- Carl Sennhenn – 2001–2003
- Francine Ringold – 2003–2007
- N. Scott Momaday – 2007–2008
- Jim Weaver McKown Barnes – 2009–2010
- Eddie Wilcoxen – 2011–2012
- Nathan Brown – 2013–2014
- Benjamin Myers – 2014–2015
- Jeanetta Calhoun Mish – 2017–2018
- Jay Snider – 2023–2024

Prior to statehood, Freeman Edwin Miller was considered the Oklahoma poet laureate.

Julious Caesar Hill was named the Poet Laureate of Oklahoma by the Poet Laureate League of America in 1939.He was the first Black poet laureate in America.

== See also ==
- Poet laureate
- List of U.S. state poets laureate
- United States Poet Laureate
- Julie Ann Ward – Poet Laureate of Norman, Oklahoma.
- Don Blanding – 1937 Poet laureate of Enid, Oklahoma.
