= APCO Oil Corporation =

- Industry: petroleum distribution
- Predecessor: Anderson-Prichard Oil Corporation
- Founded: 1960
- Defunct: 1979
- Fate: Dissolved in 1979
- Successor: Anderson Family Office
- Headquarters: Oklahoma City, Oklahoma, USA
- Area served: Arkansas, Idaho, Illinois, Iowa, Kansas, Minnesota, Missouri, Nebraska, New Mexico, North Dakota, Oklahoma, South Dakota, Texas
- Key people: Lev H. Prichard & J. Steve Anderson
- Products: APCO Gasoline

APCO Oil Corporation was an oil and petroleum goods marketing and distribution company that operated in the Oklahoma region from 1960–1979. It was a successor company to the Anderson-Prichard Oil Corporation. The term “APCO” has also been used by other entities related to the Anderson-Prichard brand.

== Name ==
“APCO” was a common acronym used within the Anderson-Prichard Oil Corporation since its founding in 1922. As early as 1926, Anderson-Prichard began attempts at trademarking the acronym, first through overtures to the American Pacific Company, and later through communications with the American Oil Company, whose trading name AMOCO was thought to be too similar. The two companies finally came to an agreement in 1954 permitting Anderson-Prichard to use the APCO name and logo.

== History ==
APCO Oil Corporation was created in 1960 when outside investors purchased the remaining parts of the Anderson-Prichard Oil Company, particularly its marketing and distribution units. In 1961, APCO remained a Fortune 500 company. The company operated service stations around Oklahoma and neighboring states including Texas, Kansas, Arkansas, and Missouri, as well as states further afield in the Midwest such as Nebraska, North Dakota, South Dakota, Minnesota, Iowa, Wisconsin and Illinois. The company was dissolved in 1979. The APCO logo was still used after the company’s dissolution by many independent service stations, and can still be spotted occasionally in the region.

== Other uses ==
The term “APCO” was frequently used informally to describe the pre-existing Anderson-Prichard Oil Company, most prominently in the case of APCO Tower in Oklahoma City, were the company was headquartered.

Since 2010, APCO Oil Corporation has been owned and operated by Anderson Prichard Oil Company founder J. Steve Anderson’s great grandson Thomas S. Austin to manage the Anderson Family’s legacy mineral rights as well as producing new wells in Texas & Oklahoma.

The “APCO” name was again used by Lev Prichard III, grandson of Anderson-Prichard Oil co-founder Lev Prichard, when he created Apco Minerals, LLP in 1995 to manage the family’s legacy mineral rights. Since 2009, the company has been managed by Prichard’s widow, Ella Wall Prichard, and is participating in the current shale oil boom in Oklahoma.

"APCO" is also the name used by the independent Australian service-station franchise Anderson Petroleum Company.
