= Maggie Culver Fry =

American poet

Maggie Culver Fry

Maggie Culver Fry (1900–1998) was the tenth poet laureate of Oklahoma, appointed in 1977 by Governor David L. Boren. Fry wrote her first poem at the age of 10 and now has more than 800 stories, poems, and articles published.

== Life and career ==
Fry, née Culver, was born in 1900 at Vian, Cherokee Nation in Oklahoma. Fry's maternal grandfather, George Deerskin Waters, traveled to Oklahoma on the Trail of Tears and was a member of the Cherokee Senate. Fry lacked a high school education but nevertheless published three books of poetry, along with fiction and magazine articles. She also an instructor at Claremore Junior College and traveled the state conducting workshop in high schools and colleges.

From 1955 to 1965, Fry served as personal secretary to Senator Clem McSpadden. Her book, The Umbilical Cord, was nominated for a Pulitzer Prize. In 1995 Fry was named poet laureate emeritus when her health forced her to stop writing and in 2015 she was inducted into the Claremore Hall of Fame.

Fry died in 1998 and is buried in the Woodlawn Cemetery in Claremore.

== Bibliography ==
- The Witch Deer: Poems of the Oklahoma Indians. Claremore: Claremore Junior College, 1955.
- The Umbilical Cord. Muskogee: Oklahoma Printing Company, 1971.
- Bucksin Hollow Reflections. Muskogee: The Five Civilized Tribes Museum, 1978.
- A Boy Named Will: The Story of Young Will Rogers. Bluestem, 1979
- Sunrise Over Red Man's Land. Claremore: Rogers State College Press, 1981
- Cherokee Female Seminary Years: A Cherokee National Anthology. Claremore: Rogers State College Press, 1988

== See also ==
- Poets Laureate of Oklahoma
