= Eddie Wilcoxen =

American poet

Eddie D. Wilcoxen (born 1949) served as the eighteenth poet laureate of the state of Oklahoma, appointed by Governor Brad Henry. Previous to his appointment, Wilcoxen was well known as a broadcaster with KWHW (AM) in Altus, Oklahoma. Wilcoxen's poetry is best classified as "folk" poetry, with an emphasis on rural life and traditions. Wilcoxen was also an accomplished karateka, training under the accomplished karateka and kickboxer, Joe Lewis. Wilcoxen then went on to create his own form of karate that he named Kihido Karate, kihido meaning "The Shining Spirit Way".

Oklahoma Proud!: A Centennial Book of Poems. Altus, OK: CTK Publishing, 2007.

Reflections of a Wandering Mind. Altus, OK: CTK Publishing, 2009.

Rose Petal Poems: Tales of Life and Love. Altus, OK: CTK Publishing, 2013.

== See also ==
- Poets Laureate of Oklahoma
