= Carol Hamilton =

American poet; Oklahoma Poet Laureate

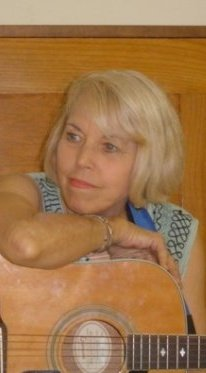
Carol Hamilton

Carol Hamilton (born August 24, 1935) was the Oklahoma Poet Laureate from 1995 to 1997.

== Biography ==
Carol Jean Barber Hamilton was born in Enid, Oklahoma on August 23, 1935. She graduated from Midwest City High School and Phillips University and received her master’s degree in English Summa Cum Laude from the University of Central Oklahoma. She also had a diploma from the Academia Hispano Americana of San Miguel de Allende, Mexico. She lived in New Haven, Connecticut and taught second grade in North Haven, Connecticut, later lived in St. Andrews, Scotland, Eagle Mills, New York, Bethany, West Virginia, Hiram, Ohio, and Indianapolis, Indiana. During these years, she taught second grade in Indianapolis. Returning to Midwest City, Oklahoma in 1971, she taught at Tinker Elementary for twelve years, then twelve years helping to develop and teach in the Academic Center for Enrichment, the elementary gifted program for Mid-Del Schools. She served as Teacher Rights Chairman for the Association of Classroom Teachers and was chosen Teacher of the Year for the Mid-Del Schools in 1982. She retired from public school teaching in 1993. She taught for 10 years as adjunct in the English Department of Rose State College, and more years in the community classes for Upward Bound, children’s and senior classes in Spanish, then taught in the graduate program for creative studies in the English Department at the University of Central Oklahoma for seven years. She received an Outstanding Alumni Award at the University of Central Oklahoma and was appointed one of 125 Luminaries for the 125th anniversary of the University of Central Oklahoma. She served as president of the Poetry Society of Oklahoma and Mid-Oklahoma Writers, secretary and board member for the Individual Artists of Oklahoma. She is a former Poet Laureate of Oklahoma and has published 19 books and chapbooks: children’s novels, legends and poetry for which she won a Southwest Book Award, Oklahoma Book Award, David Ray Poetry Prize, Byline Magazine literary awards in both short story and poetry, Warren Keith Poetry Award, Pegasus Award, Chiron Review Chapbook Award.

She also worked as a storyteller in schools around the state and arts festivals and other events. She was a member of the First Christian Church of Midwest City where she was an elder emeritus. She served as a volunteer translator for 21 years in pediatrics at Variety Health Center, volunteered at Regional Food Bank and Skyline Ministries’ eye clinic. She traveled many times to Spanish-speaking countries as a translator for medical teams and co-led church groups of young people to work at an orphanage in Mexico and also to co-lead church young people from around the state mountain climbing in New Mexico and Colorado. She also did volunteer work with Supporting Offenders to Achieve Reintigration (S.O.A.R.) for many years.

== See also ==
- Poets Laureate of Oklahoma
