= Benjamin Myers (poet) =

American poet (born 1975)

- Born: 1975 (age 50–51)
- Education: University of the Ozarks; Washington University in St. Louis
- Occupations: Poet essayist educator musician

Benjamin Myers (born 1975) is an American poet, essayist, educator, and musician. In 2015, Oklahoma Governor Mary Fallin appointed Myers the twentieth poet laureate of Oklahoma. He has written three books of poetry, and his poems have appeared in many nationally prominent periodicals.

== Biography ==
Myers was raised in Chandler, Oklahoma, United States, by parents who were both writers themselves, his mother being well-known young-adult novelist Anna Myers and his father writing poetry. Myers earned his bachelor's in English from The University of the Ozarks and his Ph.D. in literature from Washington University in St. Louis. Myers teaches at Oklahoma Baptist University, where he is the Crouch-Mathis Professor of Literature.

Myers has written essays on poetry and on liberal arts education for several Oklahoma-based magazines, such as Oklahoma Today and Oklahoma Humanities, as well as for national conservative magazines First Things and The Imaginative Conservative.

In addition to his literary work, Myers is a musician, playing bass in the rock band Flying Armadillo.

== Bibliography ==
- Elegy for Trains. Oklahoma City: Village Books Press, 2010.
- Lapse Americana. NY: New York Quarterly Books, 2013.
- Black Sunday: The Dust Bowl Sonnets. Beaumont, TX: Lamar University Literary Press, 2019.

== See also ==
- Poets Laureate of Oklahoma
