= Francine Ringold =

American poet

- Born: 1934 (age 91–92) New York City

Francine Leffler Ringold (born 1934) is an American writer and editor who was the 15th poet laureate of the State of Oklahoma.

Born and raised in New York City, Ringold in 1966 became the editor of Nimrod, the literary magazine of the University of Tulsa, where she earned her Ph.D. Ringold went on to edit Nimrod and teach at the University of Tulsa for nearly 50 years.

== See also ==
- Poets Laureate of Oklahoma
