= List of people from Enid, Oklahoma =

This is a list of people from Enid, Oklahoma.

== Academics ==
- Melissa Dell - economics professor, Harvard University, winner of the John Bates Clark Medal

== Actors and actresses ==
- Richard Erdman - actor, Stalag 17, Community
- Glenda Farrell - actress
- Lynn Herring - actress, General Hospital, Days of Our Lives
- Thad Luckinbill - actor, star of The Young and the Restless
- Russell Scott - Blinky the Clown, Blinky's Fun Club

== Artists ==
- Donna Cox - digital artist, scientist, and academic
- Mark Enger - painter
- Matt Enger - painter
- Gene Havlick - Academy Award-winning film editor
- Paladine Roye - Ponca artist
- James B. Shackelford - cinematographer
- Lyndon Stromberg - sculptor

== Athletes ==
- Kody Bliss - CFL
- Lydell Carr - running back for the Arizona Cardinals
- Todd Franz - 2005 NFL player, Green Bay Packers
- Steve Fuller - NFL
- Don Haskins - Naismith Basketball Hall of Fame coach of 1966 NCAA Champion Texas Western Miners, subject of book and movie Glory Road
- Ray Hayward - Major League Baseball pitcher
- Andrew Hoxie - USSF soccer player
- Lou Kretlow - Major League Baseball pitcher
- Chris McCubbins - Olympian, runner
- Ken Mendenhall - NFL
- William E. "Pinky" Newell - athletic trainer, Purdue University, a founder of the National Athletic Trainers' Association
- Stacy Prammanasudh - LPGA
- Brent Price - NBA
- Mark Price - NBA
- Rip Radcliff - Major League Baseball outfielder
- Lil Stoner - Major League Baseball pitcher, also played for Champlin Oilers
- John Ward - NFL
- Jeff Zimmerman - NFL

== Architects ==
- Karl Kamrath - architect and tennis player

== Authors ==
- Minnie Keith Bailey - poet, suffragette
- Don Blanding - poet, author
- Theresa Druley Black - poet, educator
- Walter Bowart - author, psychedelic drug advocate
- J. Quinn Brisben - poet, socialist presidential candidate
- Wade Burleson - author and historian
- Athie Sale Davis - poet, editor
- Angie Debo - author, historian, teacher at Enid High School
- Charlotte De Clue - Osage poet
- Jon Franklin - author, two-time Pulitzer Prize winner
- Carol Hamilton - Poet Laureate of Oklahoma, 1995-1997
- Marquis James - author, two-time Pulitzer Prize winner
- Louis Jenkins - poet
- D.L. Lang - Poet Laureate of Vallejo, California
- Quraysh Ali Lansana - poet, civil rights historian
- Mark Potts - Pulitzer prize winning journalist and filmmaker
- Betty Lou Shipley - Poet Laureate of Oklahoma, 1997-1998
- Bess Truitt - Poet Laureate of Oklahoma, 1945-1946

== Business owners ==
- Sherman Billingsley - founder and owner of the Stork Club in New York City
- Sam Boyd - casino owner
- Clyde Cessna - aviation pioneer, aircraft manufacturer
- Harold Hamm - owner of Continental Resources and Hiland Partners; billionaire

== Criminals ==
- Daniel Holtzclaw - serial sexual assault under color of authority as Oklahoma City police officer

== Musicians and singers ==
- Vida Chenoweth - first professional solo classical marimbist
- Karen Dalton - singer, musician
- Kyle Dillingham - violinist
- Casey Grillo - drummer for power metal group Kamelot
- Michael Hedges - guitarist
- Mark Kelly - bassist for Petra
- Leona Mitchell - opera singer
- Brad Richter - classical guitarist
- Sam Rivers - jazz musician
- Matthew Schultz - musician, Pigface, Lab Report
- Mark Selby - musician
- Don Yule - opera singer with the New York City Opera

== Television and radio personalities ==
- Glenn Hauser - DXer
- Sharron Miller - Emmy Award and Directors Guild of America Award winning television director, producer, writer
- Harold Taft - television meteorologist

== Politicians and military figures ==
- Patrick Anderson - Oklahoma state senator
- Page Belcher - Oklahoma US representative
- Robert M. Blair - Medal of Honor recipient
- James Yancy Callahan - Oklahoma territorial delegate to the US House of Representatives
- John Newbold Camp - Oklahoma US representative
- Bud Cummins - United States attorney
- Frank Frantz - seventh Oklahoma territorial governor
- Milton C. Garber - Oklahoma US representative; editor of Enid News & Eagle
- Owen K. Garriott - astronaut
- Jerauld R. Gentry - Air Force test pilot
- Bo Gritz - former US Army Special Forces operator; political activist
- Stephen Jones - attorney
- Harold Kiner - Medal of Honor recipient
- Norman Lamb - Oklahoma Secretary of Veterans Affairs
- Todd Lamb - lt. governor of Oklahoma
- E. Bay Mitchell - judge, Oklahoma Court of Civil Appeals
- John D. Russell - federal judge, United States District Court for the Northern District of Oklahoma
- Kenneth M. Taylor - USAF general, Pearl Harbor hero
- Leon Vance - Medal of Honor recipient
- George H. Wilson - Oklahoma US representative

== Religious figures ==
- Wade Burleson - minister
- Yahweh Ben Yahweh (Hulon Mitchell Jr.) - founder, Nation of Yahweh

== Scientists ==
- Paul H. Allen - botanist

== Other ==
- Letitia Chambers - director of the Heard Museum

== See also ==
- List of mayors of Enid, Oklahoma
