= Louisa McCune =

American magazine editor (1970–2024)

Louisa Douglas McCune (May 11, 1970 – August 10, 2024) was a philanthropy executive and magazine editor, working in the contemporary arts and animal well-being. She was the executive director of the Kirkpatrick Foundation in Oklahoma City, Oklahoma, where she was engaged with arts and culture, education, animal well-being, environmental conservation, and historic preservation. McCune died August 10, 2024, aged 54, from cancer.

== Early life and education ==
McCune was born on May 11, 1970 to Edward Allison McCune (1930–2005), a surgeon, and Margaret Douglas Rucks McCune (b. 1935), a homemaker. McCune was of Scottish descent. McCune has three older siblings: Joe McCune, a lawyer; Allison Davis, an entrepreneur; and Evelyn Stival, a homemaker.

She was a member of St. Paul's Episcopal Cathedral in Oklahoma City. She was married to Chad Elmore from 2004 to 2015. McCune was the mother of three sons, with whom she resided: McCune (Mac); Rucks; and Edward. Her eldest son appeared in a Flaming Lips film, Christmas on Mars, as "the baby", in a dream sequence with a Martian marching band.

Her great-grandfather, W.W. Rucks, was the co-founder of Oklahoma City's Wesley Hospital (1910), which went on to become Presbyterian Hospital (1964) and later OU Medical Center.

Her grandmother, Louise Earthman Rucks (1904–1989), wrote a column for thirty-six years about animals for The Daily Oklahoman called "Hound Hill", which was the namesake for McCune's residence.

McCune's paternal great-grandfather, John Starr Allison, was known as the pioneer town physician in Tahlequah, Oklahoma, for many decades until his death in 1955. Her paternal grandfather, Edward H. McCune, was an educator, recognized for his published works of poetry. He also coached Pretty Boy Floyd in basketball during his time in Sallisaw, Oklahoma.

McCune took up painting as a teenager, crediting Alex Georges of Houston, Texas, with introducing her to the hobby. Over the years, she has exhibited paintings in Oklahoma City, once at a small salon showing in 2000 and again in 2018 at JRB Art at the Elms.

McCune graduated from Enid High School in 1988 from her hometown of Enid, Oklahoma. She studied at Colorado Mountain College from 1988 to 1989, and then the University of Colorado, Boulder, from 1989 to 1990. In 1992 she graduated with a bachelor's degree from San Francisco State University.

From September 1992 to May 1993, McCune lived in West Africa, where she had temporary employment with Evergreen Helicopters on a World Health Organization project to eradicate onchocerciasis. McCune received her FAA Pilot's License in 1993. In 2002, she founded the Sallie McFarland Rucks Memorial Reader Series at Wilson Arts Elementary School in Oklahoma City.

McCune was an advocate for animal well-being, including farm animal welfare, particularly for pigs and chickens, rural communities, and fair markets for farmers and ranchers. She has also expressed opinions regarding private prisons and the over-incarceration of Oklahoma citizens.

== Kirkpatrick Foundation ==
McCune joined the Kirkpatrick Foundation in April 2011 as executive director. She was also secretary of the Board (ex officio) for the foundation.

Under McCune's direction, the foundation established two major initiatives to make Oklahoma state "the safest and most humane place to be an animal by 2032" (launched in 2012), and to increase Oklahoma's cat and dog "live release" rate to 90 percent by 2025 (launched in 2018). Both of these efforts are a part of the foundation's Safe & Humane initiative.

In 2016 the foundation published The Oklahoma Animal Study that McCune edited. It was the first comprehensive study of a geographic region and its animal population. In 2018, McCune oversaw the production of Reporting Animal Cruelty, a manual created for veterinarians to use when dealing with cases of animal cruelty. The project expounded upon a manual that Animal Folks Minneapolis had created.

In 2015 the Kirkpatrick Foundation Safe & Humane initiative established the ANIMAL Conference of Ideas, Impact, and Inspiration as a triennial event, that McCune hosted and directed. McCune's also organized the Save Lives. Unite Oklahoma event in April 2018 and the 2017 Intersection conference for Oklahoma Link Coalition, launching the "Animal Friendly" Oklahoma Specialty updated license plate.

In 2016, McCune led a non-partisan public education initiative for Kirkpatrick Foundation related to State Question 777, also known as Right to Farm.

== Publishing ==
McCune was also the editor in chief and co-founder of ArtDesk, a contemporary arts magazine published quarterly by the Kirkpatrick Foundation. Her background in publishing and editing includes a thirteen-year term as editor in chief of Oklahoma Today (1997–2011). She had an internship at Harper's Magazine was contributing editor for The American Benefactor, and wrote freelance for Worth, George, Mirabella, New York, and Green. She was assistant editor for Fools for Scandal: How the Media Invented Whitewater published by Harper's Magazine's Franklin Square Press in 1996. Her first job in journalism was at the Enid News & Eagle (1994–1995), as a general assignment reporter. In 2018 McCune co-edited with Teresa Miller the anthology Love Can Be: A Literary Collection About Our Animals (Kirkpatrick Foundation, 2018) distributed by the University of Oklahoma Press.

McCune was influenced by Christian Keesee (chairman, Kirkpatrick Foundation), Steven Walker (principal, Walker Creative), Joan Henderson (former publisher, Oklahoma Today), and Lewis Lapham (editor, Lapham's Quarterly).

=== Oklahoma Today ===
From 1997 to 2011, McCune served as editor in chief of Oklahoma Today magazine, a bimonthly print publication focused on the culture, food, places, people, and history of Oklahoma. Under her direction the magazine was awarded three Society of Professional Journalists (SPJ) Best Magazine awards, two Magazine of the Year awards from the International Regional Magazine Association, and other national and state-level recognition.

=== Editor ===
- ArtDesk
- Love Can Be: A Literary Collection About Our Animals, Co-Editor with Teresa Miller ISBN 9780999699300
- The Oklahoma Animal Study
- Oklahoma Today

=== Contributor ===
- Arthur Frommer's Budget Travel
- Journal Record
- National Geographic Traveler
- OKC Business
- OKC Pets Magazine
- The Oklahoman
- Reader's Digest
- Voices from the Heartland, Contributor ISBN 9780806138589
- World Literature Today
- Worth, Factchecker
- ZooSounds

== Boards and Advisory roles ==
- Kirkpatrick Foundation
- Philanthropy Southwest
- Animal Grantmakers
- Kirkpatrick Family Fund
- Oklahoma Contemporary Arts Center
- Green Box Arts Festival, advisor
- Wilson Arts
- Oklahoma Center for Poets and Writers
- Oklahoma Music Hall of Fame
- City Arts Center
- Oklahoma Center for Community and Justice

== Professional awards ==
- Community Service Award (Dialogue Institute of the Southwest, May 2014)
- Pride of the Plainsmen Award (Enid High School, 2013)
- Achiever Under 40 (The Journal Record, 2007)
- Bill Thurman Memorial Media in the Arts Award at the Oklahoma Governor's Arts Awards (2003)
- Forty Under 40 Oklahoma City Leaders (OKC Business, 2002)
- Thirty Under 30 (Magazine Publishers of America, 1999)

In addition McCune served as a judge for the National Magazine Awards, Oklahoma Book Awards, and the Thatcher Hoffman Smith Prize, an award honoring college-level creativity.

In 2006, McCune successfully nominated editor Lewis Lapham to the American Society of Magazine Editors Hall of Fame. In his letter of support, Kurt Vonnegut described Lapham's absence from the hall of fame as being akin to Babe Ruth not being in Cooperstown. He was inducted in February 2007.
