= Enid High School =

Coordinates: 36.387954°N 97.886007°W

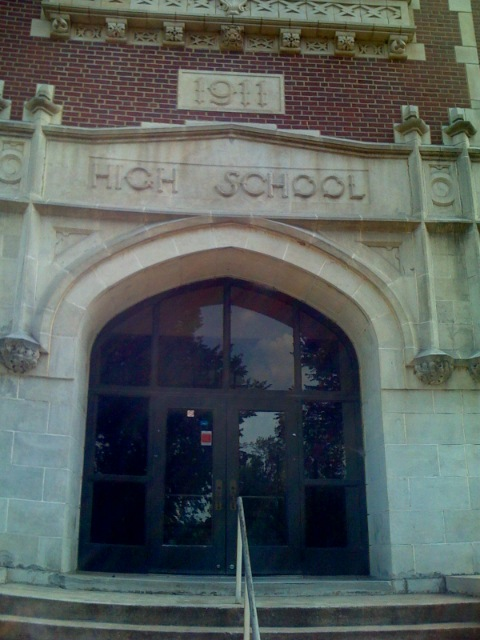

Location
- 600 W. Wabash; Enid, Oklahoma 73701; United States

Information
- Type: Public school
- Established: 1884
- Principal: Craig Liddell
- Teaching staff: 113.53 (FTE)
- Grades: 9-12
- Enrollment: 2,234 (2023-2024)
- Student to teacher ratio: 19.68
- Colors: Navy and white
- Mascot: Plainsman
- Yearbook: The Quill
- Website: www.enidpublicschools.org/o/ehs

Enid High School (EHS) is a public tertiary school in Enid, Oklahoma, U.S., operated by the Enid Public Schools school district. With a student body of about 2035 in grades 9–12, Enid High School has a matriculation rate of about 65 percent.

The school district - Enid High's attendance zone - covers central-west Enid and some unincorporated areas.

== History ==
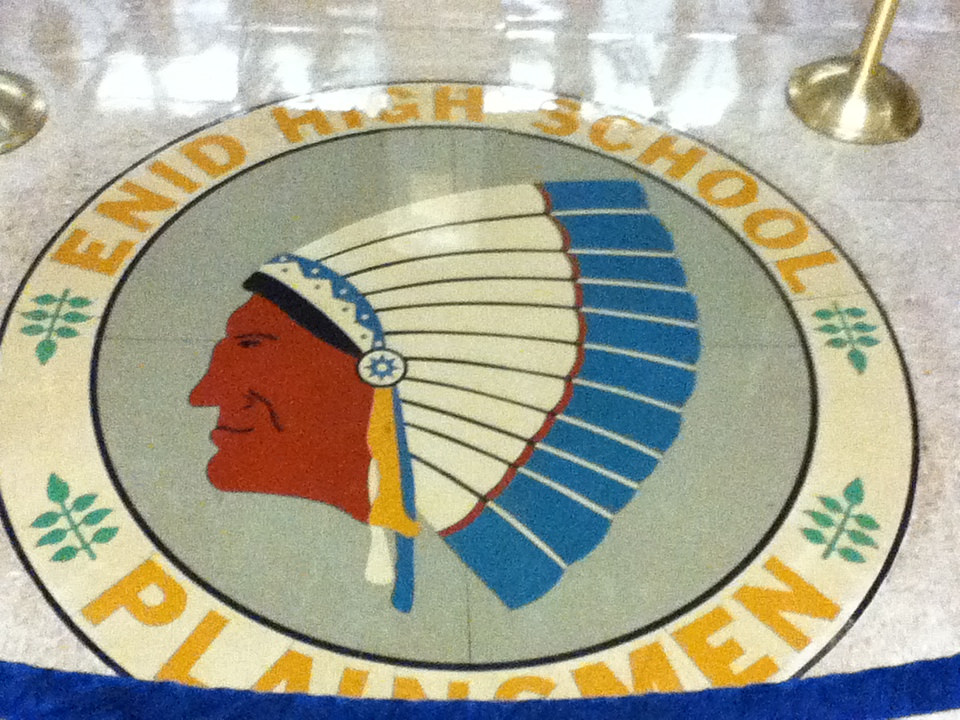
The Enid High School seal on the floor of the main hall of the high school.

EHS began as a tent school shortly after the land run in 1893, operating out of various locations throughout Enid including an opera house and a Baptist church. Between 1906 and 1912, classes took place in the "old" Lincoln school, now long-demolished, at 600 North Independence. By February 1912, the high school's current building was constructed. It was accredited by the North Central Association of Colleges and Secondary Schools in 1911, and holds the distinction of being the second high school in Oklahoma to be accredited by the organization. Enid High operated as a segregated school district from 1896 to 1959 with black children attending Booker T. Washington, Douglass and George Washington Carver Schools.

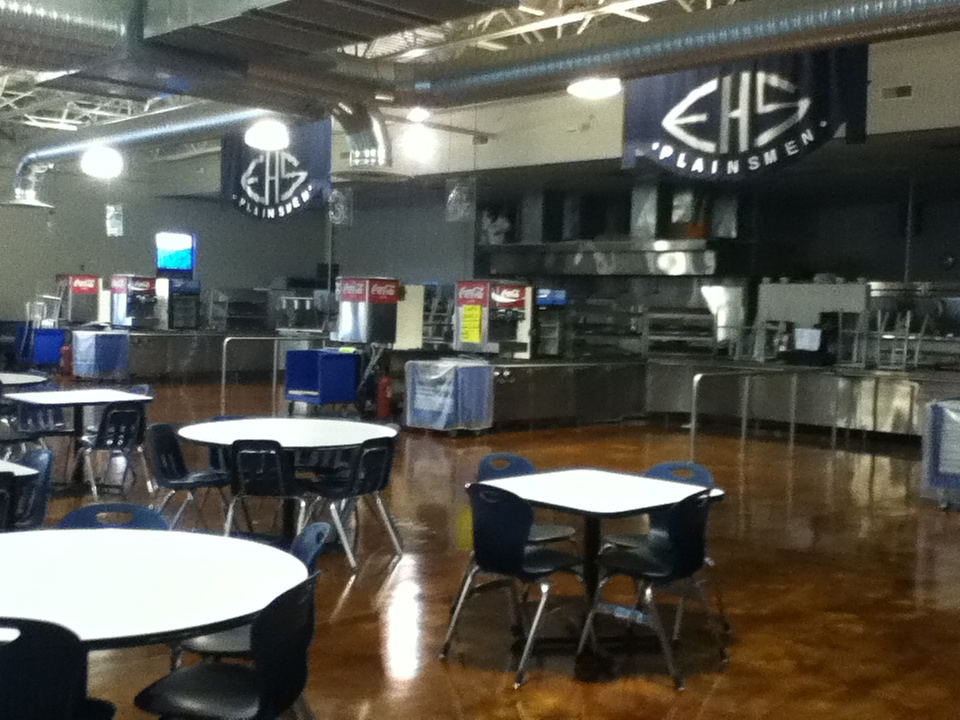
Enid High's renovated cafeteria was created in 2005 following implementation of the closed campus lunchtime policy.

In 1943, a fire broke out, damaging the building. From 1943 to 1948, classes were held at Emerson and Longfellow Junior High Schools, displacing the seventh graders, who remained at their respective elementary schools. The school finished restoration in 1948, added a gym in 1950, an auditorium in 1953, a music building in 1991, and a large food court in 2005 to accommodate a new closed campus policy. During these times several new class rooms were also added. The building did not have air conditioning until a bond was passed in 1997.

== Demographics ==
In 2017, 200 of the students were Marshallese. By 2014 the school had a student club where Marshallese students taught the overall student population about their culture. Circa 2014 a multicultural choir was formed.

== Athletics and clubs ==
Enid High School has several sports programs including American football, baseball, basketball, bowling, cheerleading, cross country, golf, marching band, track and field, tennis, soccer, softball, swimming, volleyball, show choir, and wrestling.

The basketball, wrestling, and volleyball programs were played in the historic Mark Price Arena until March 23, 2008, when the athletic director, Bill Mayberry, made the decision to move the home games and events to the athletic village on the Northern Oklahoma College campus, due to the deteriorating condition of the arena. The Plainsmen American football and soccer programs play in one of the oldest stadiums in the state, D. Bruce Selby Stadium.

=== Awards ===
- The Plainsmen American football team has won six state championships (in 1919, 1942, 1964, 1965, 1966 and 1983) and was runner-up in 2006.
- Enid High School is known for its "Big Blue Band", which has placed in the finals for the Oklahoma Bandmaster's Competition every year from 1981 to 2009 and has consistently won superior ratings since 2014.
- Enid High School's Political Science/Constitution Team has won state competitions and made it to national competitions in 18 out of 19 years.

== Notable alumni ==
- Bess Truitt 1901 - Oklahoma Poet Laureate
- Marquis James 1909 – Pulitzer Prize–winning author
- Theresa Druley Black 1911 - Poet and educator
- Vida Chenoweth 1947 – classical marimba player, linguist
- Owen K. Garriott 1948 – astronaut
- Don Haskins 1948 – Naismith Basketball Hall of Fame. Oklahoma State player. Coach of 1966 NCAA Champion Texas Western (later UTEP), which was basis of the best-selling book and movie Glory Road, assistant coach for USA Basketball in the 1968 and 1972 Olympics
- Leona Mitchell 1949 - world-renowned opera singer
- Jim Sheets 1949 – Arkansas politician; Kiwanis International figure
- J. Quinn Brisben 1952 - 1992 Socialist party presidential candidate, poet
- Karen Dalton - 1955 - Folk singer
- Jimmy O'Neill - 1957 - Host of Shindig!
- Louis Jenkins - 1960 - American prose poet
- Harry Jones 1963 – former football player for Philadelphia Eagles (1967–1971)
- Harold Hamm 1964 – billionaire oil and gas developer
- Jim Riley 1965 – former defensive end for the Oklahoma Sooners and Miami Dolphins (1967–1972)
- Ken Mendenhall 1966 – former NFL player Baltimore Colts (1971–1981)
- Michael Hedges 1972 – Grammy-winning musician
- Serene Jones 1977 - President and Johnston Family Professor for Religion and Democracy at Union Theological Seminary in New York City
- Ray Hayward, 1979 – baseball player, selected by San Diego Padres in first round (10th overall) of the 1983 amateur entry draft
- Quraysh Ali Lansana 1982 - American poet, civil rights historian
- Mark Price 1982 – retired NBA and Georgia Tech point guard
- Lydell Carr 1984 - running back for the Phoenix Cardinals
- Brent Price 1987 – retired NBA basketball player, South Carolina and Oklahoma point guard
- Louisa McCune - 1988, Oklahoma Today editor
- Todd Lamb 1990 – President of the University of Central Oklahoma, former Lieutenant Governor of Oklahoma
- Thad Luckinbill 1994 – actor
- Kyle Dillingham 1997 - violinist, 2014 Pride of the Plainsmen award recipient
- Stacy Prammanasudh 1998 – professional golfer, LPGA
- D.L. Lang 2001 - Poet laureate of Vallejo, California
- Mark Potts 2003 - Pulitzer Prize winning journalist
- Daniel Holtzclaw 2005 – Oklahoma City police officer, convicted in 2015 of multiple counts of rape and sexual assault
- Lincoln Sefcik 2018 – Professional football player
- John Holt – former NFL player for Tampa Bay Buccaneers (1981–1985) and Indianapolis Colts (1985–1989)
- Jerry Keeling – former CFL player for the Calgary Stampeders (1961–1974), Ottawa Rough Riders (1975), Hamilton Tiger-Cats (1976)
- Homer Paine – former NFL player for Chicago Hornets (1949)
- Stan West – former NFL player for the Los Angeles Rams (1950–1954), New York Giants (1955), and Chicago Cardinals (1956–1957)

== Gallery ==
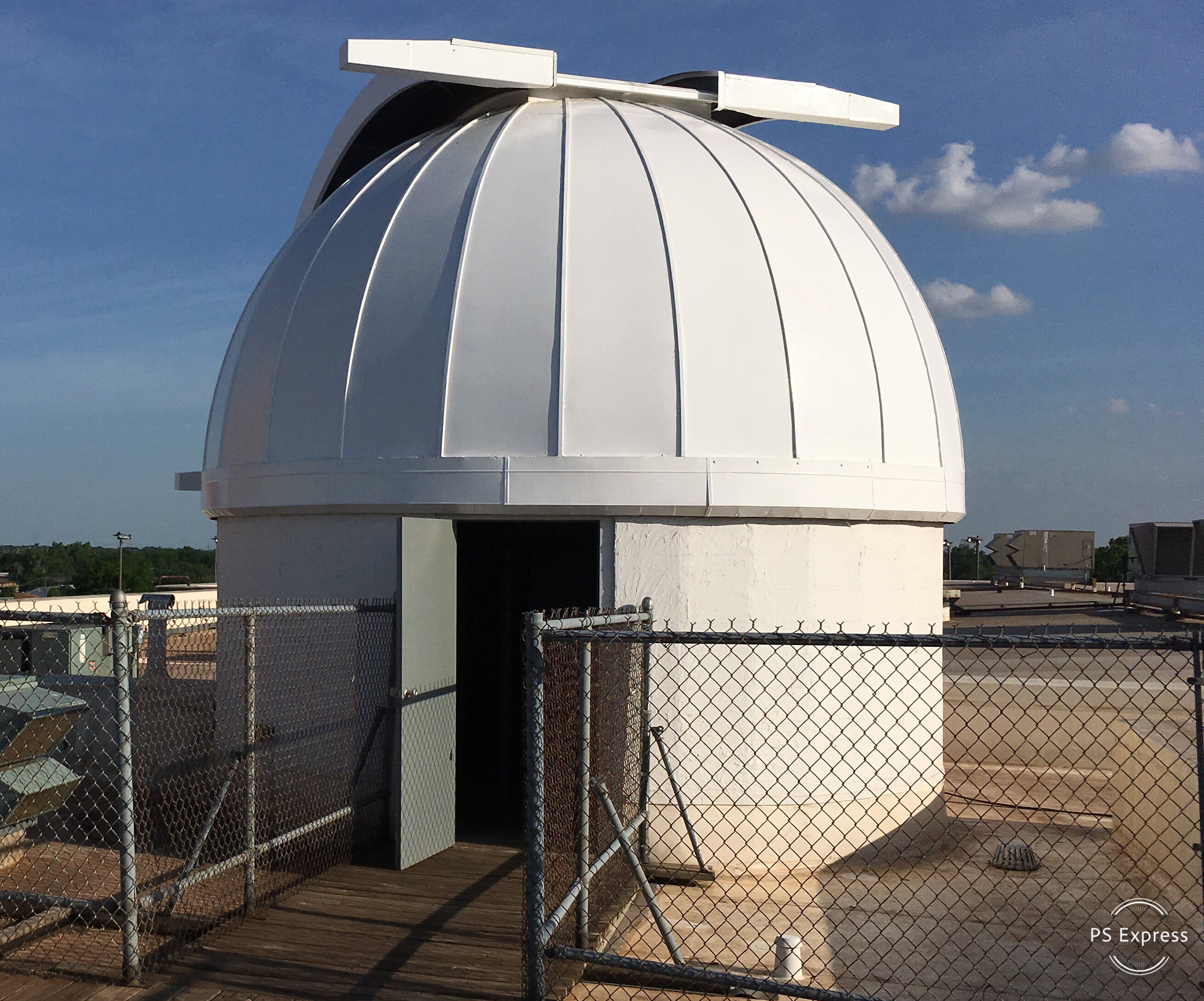
Dr. Nancy Currie-Gregg Observatory at Enid High School

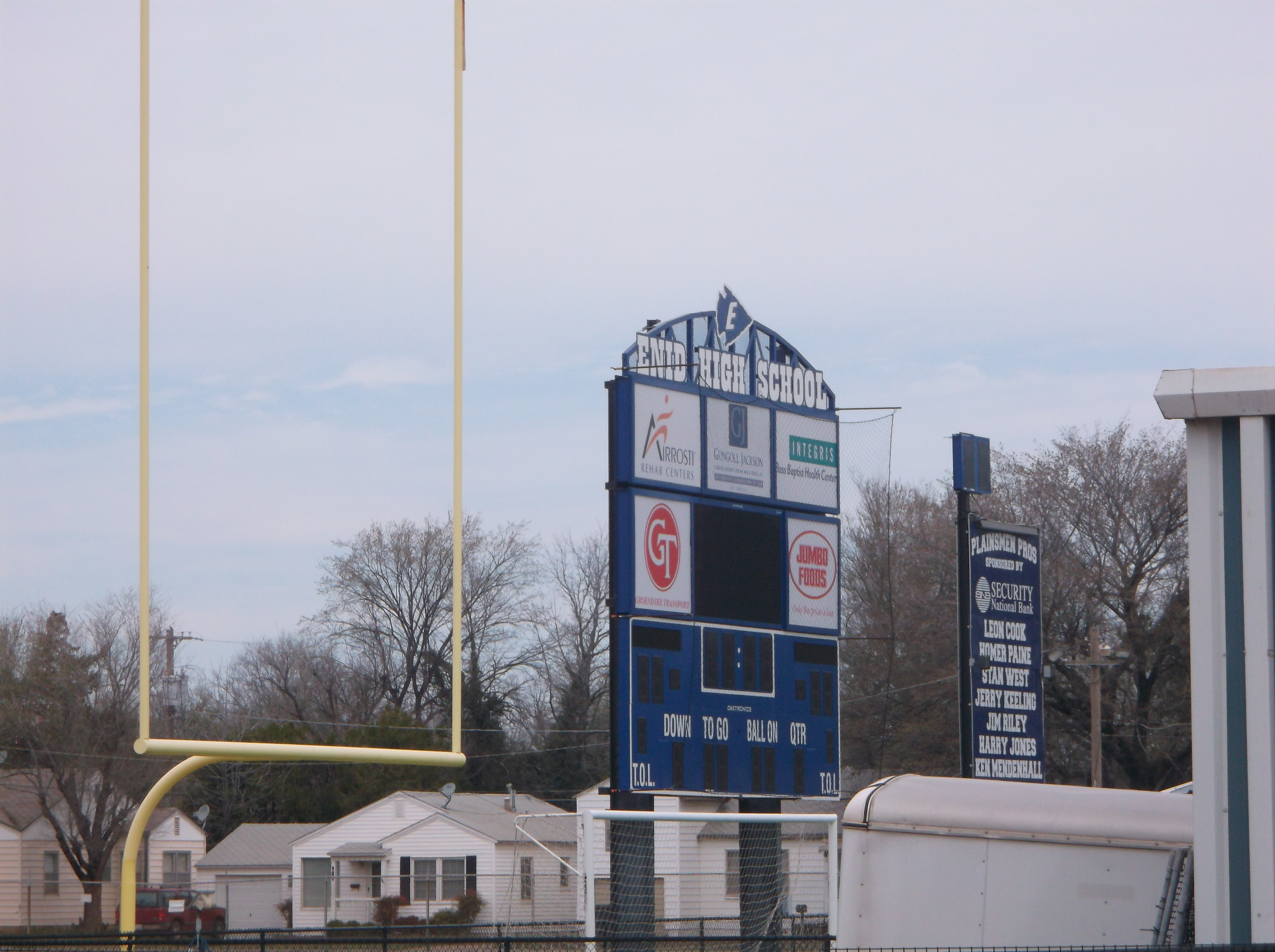
D Bruce Selby Football Stadium

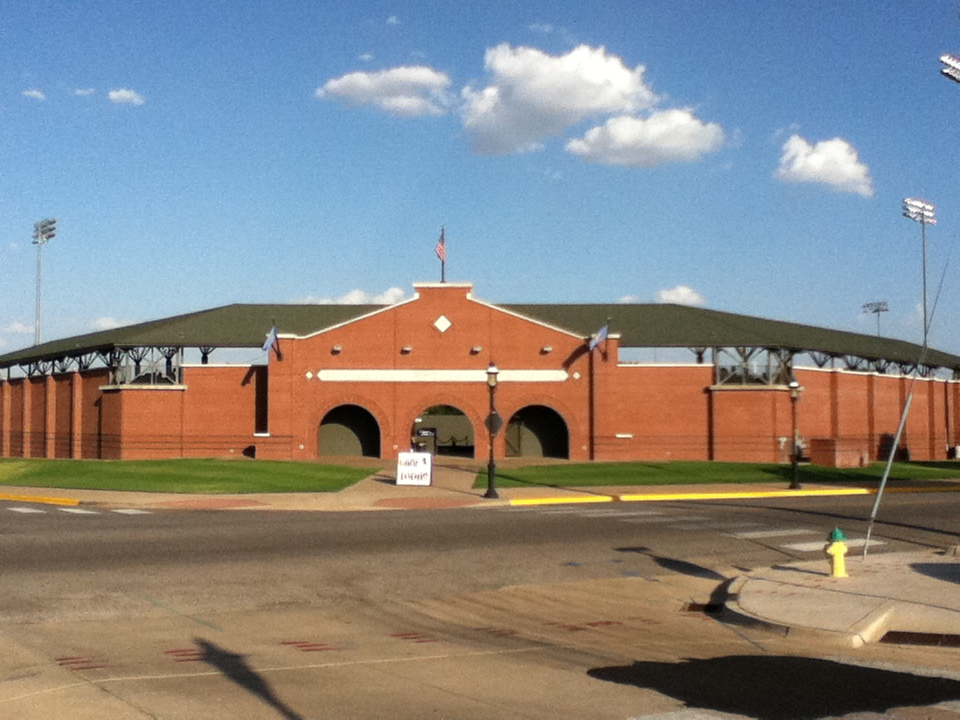
David Allen Memorial Ballpark

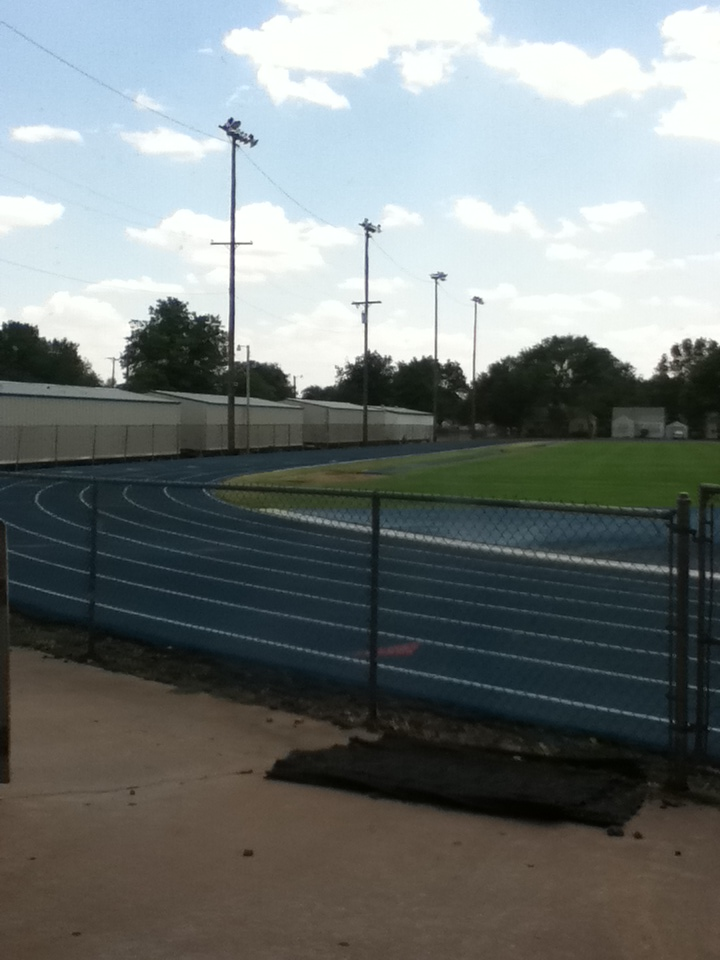
Enid High School's track.

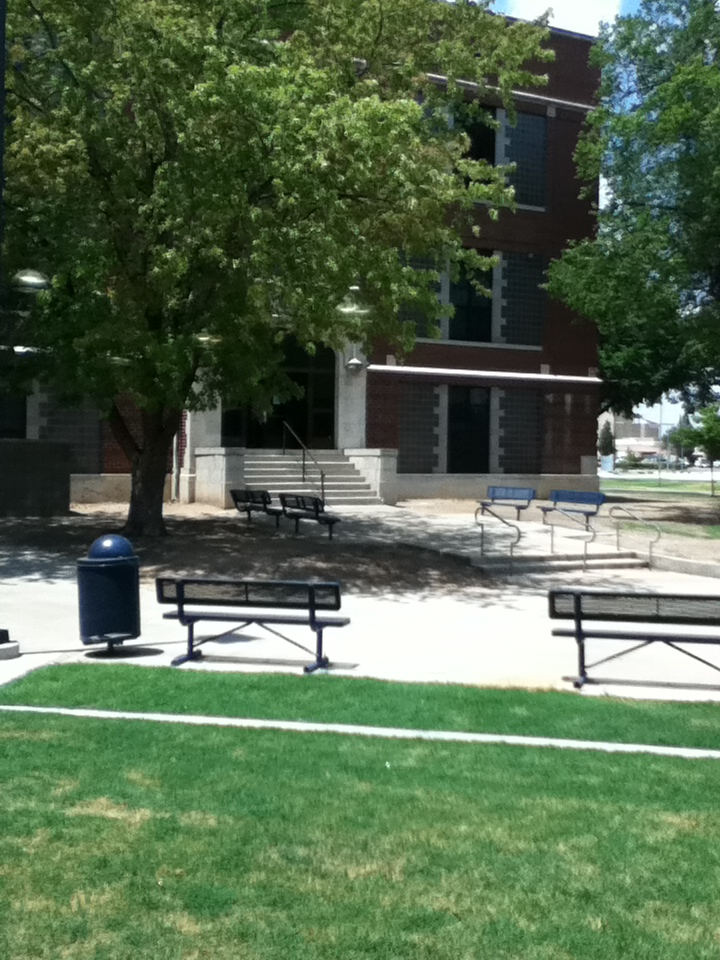
EHS courtyard

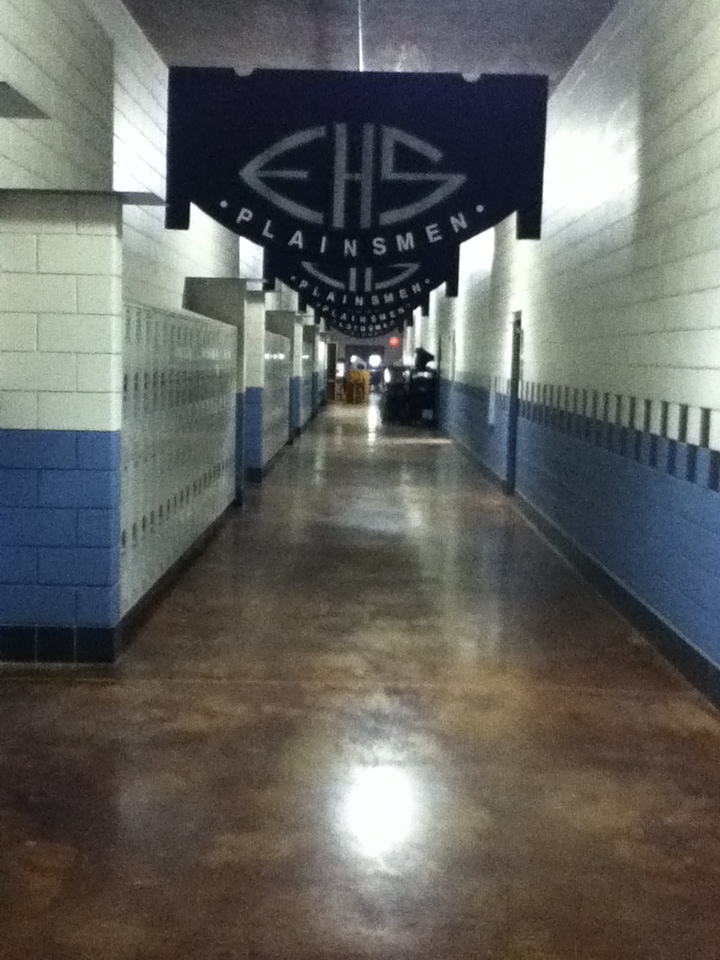
EHS banner in hallway

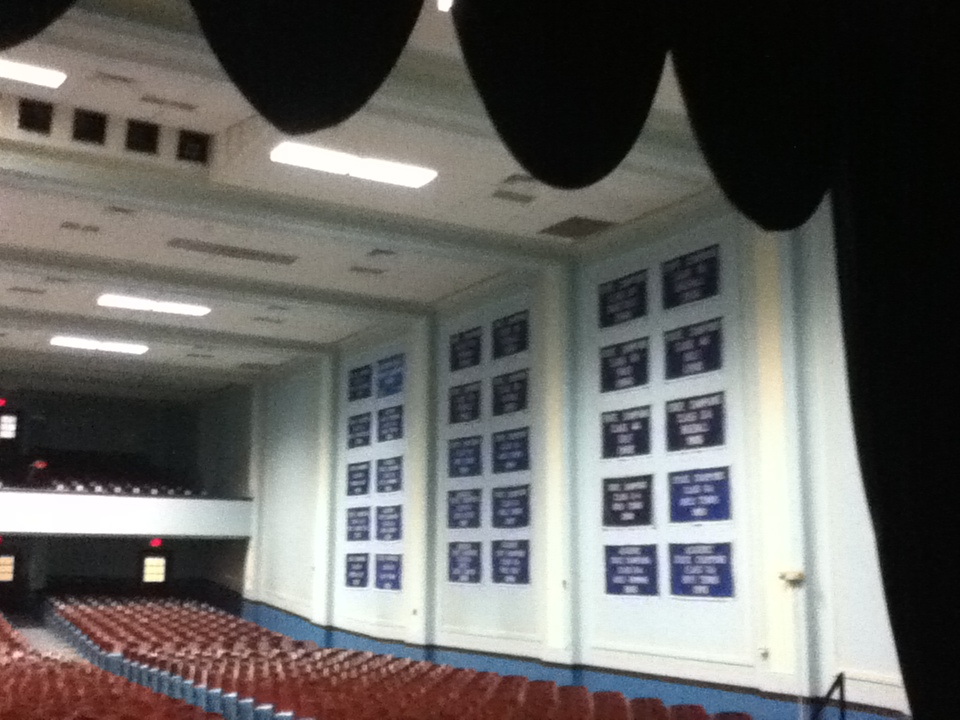
Enid High Auditorium

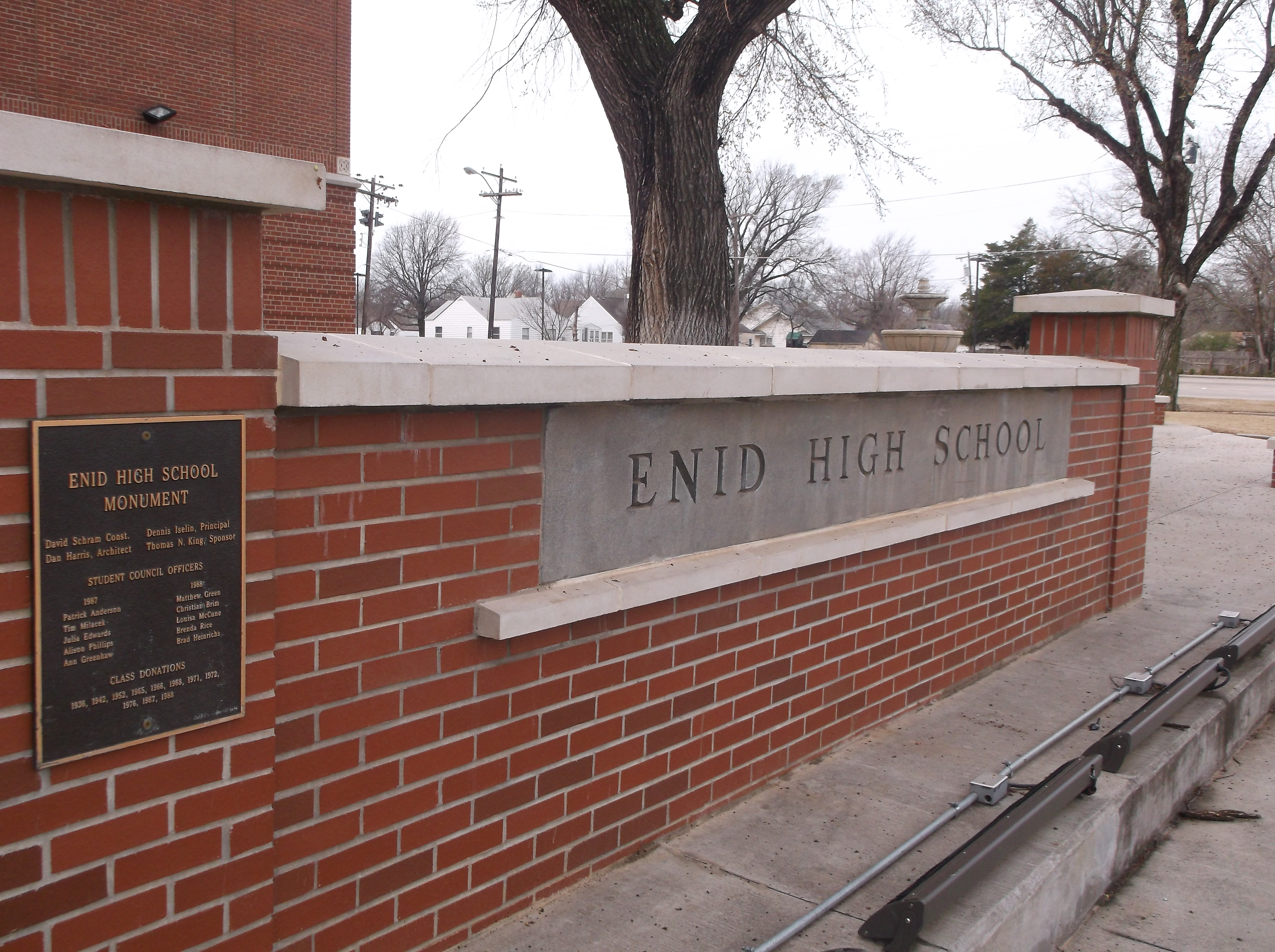
Enid High School sign

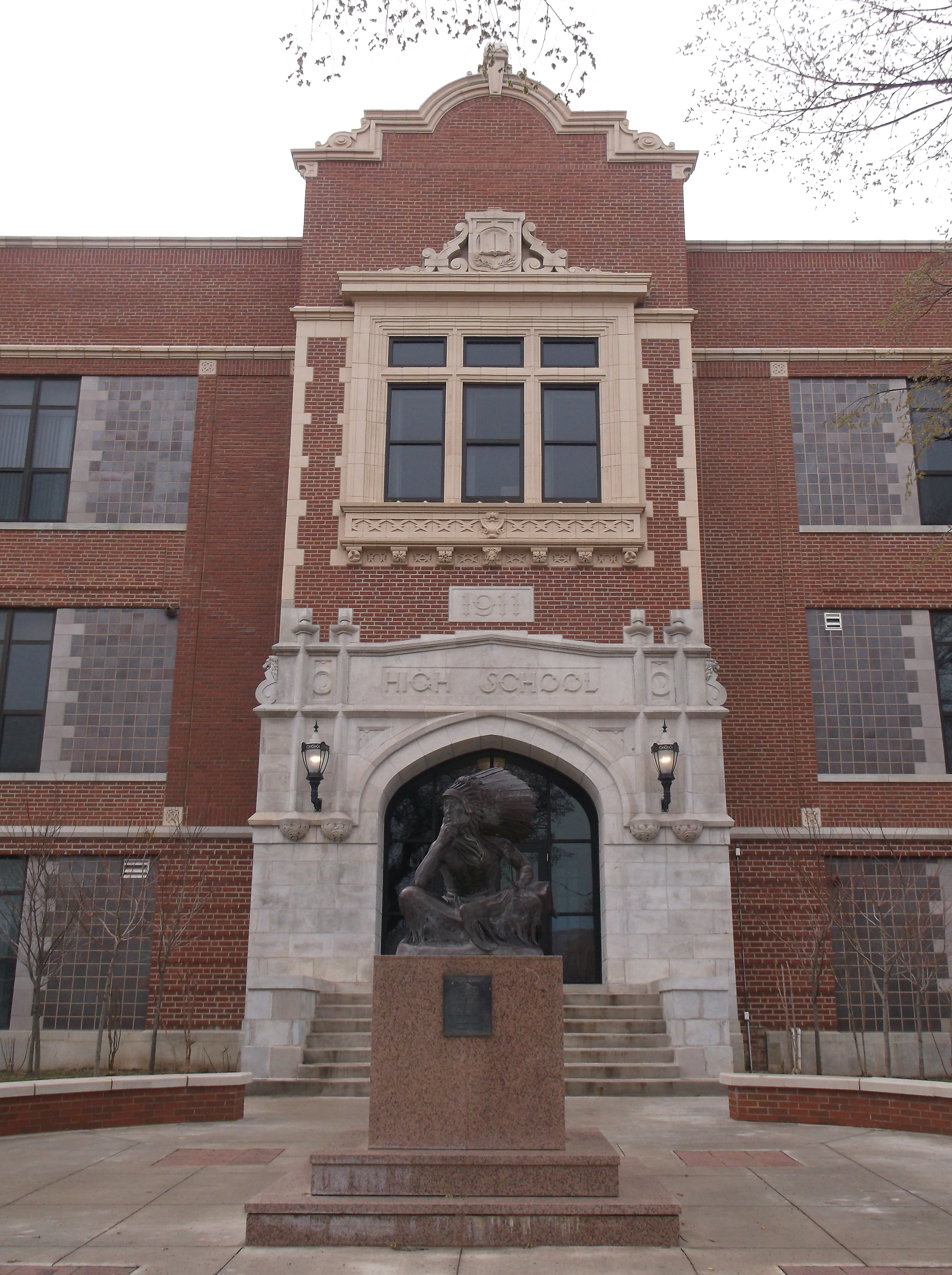
Front of Enid High School

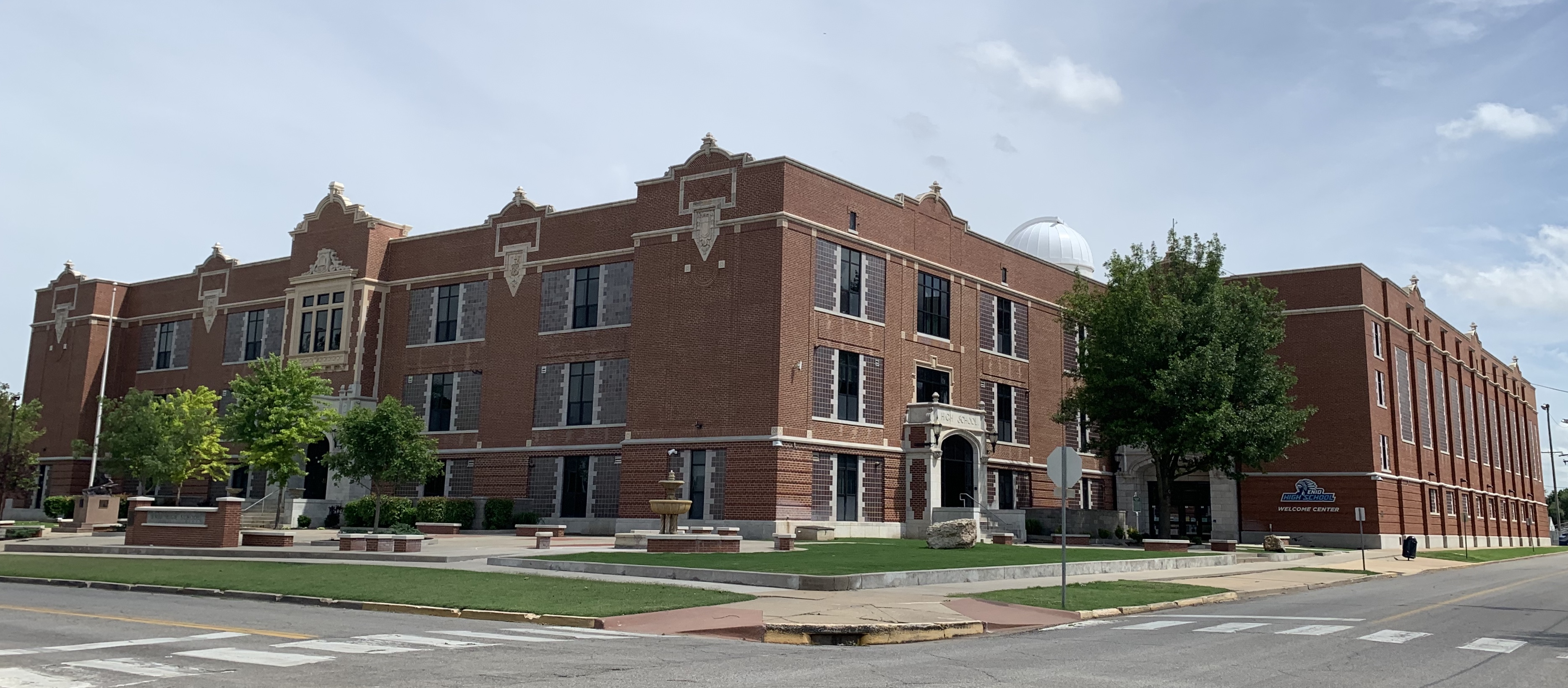
Enid High School

== See also ==
- Enid Public Schools
