= Enid Public Schools =

School district in Oklahoma

Address
- 500 South Independence Enid, Oklahoma, 73701; United States
- Coordinates: 36.391976°N 97.879963°W

District information
- Type: Public
- Motto: Excellence. Pride. Success.
- Grades: PK-12
- Established: 1892
- Superintendent: Dr. Darrell Floyd
- NCES District ID: 4010920

Students and staff
- Students: 7,390 (2020–2021)
- Teachers: 444.68 (FTE)
- Staff: 550.04 (FTE)
- Student–teacher ratio: 16.62:1

Other information
- Website: www.enidpublicschools.org

Enid Public Schools is a public school district located in Enid, Oklahoma, USA. The school district had an enrollment of 7,540 students in September 2012.

The district covers central-west Enid and some unincorporated areas.

== Demographics ==
In 2014 there were 381 students in Enid Public Schools who were Marshallese in English language learner programs, and two of the elementary schools had at least 25% of their total students being Marshallese ELL students. The district, in 2017, had two liaisons meant for the Marshallese population. In 2017, 200 of the students at Enid High School were Marshallese, and by 2014 the school had a student club where Marshallese students taught the overall student population about their culture. Longfellow Middle School also had such a club.

== List of schools ==
=== Secondary schools ===
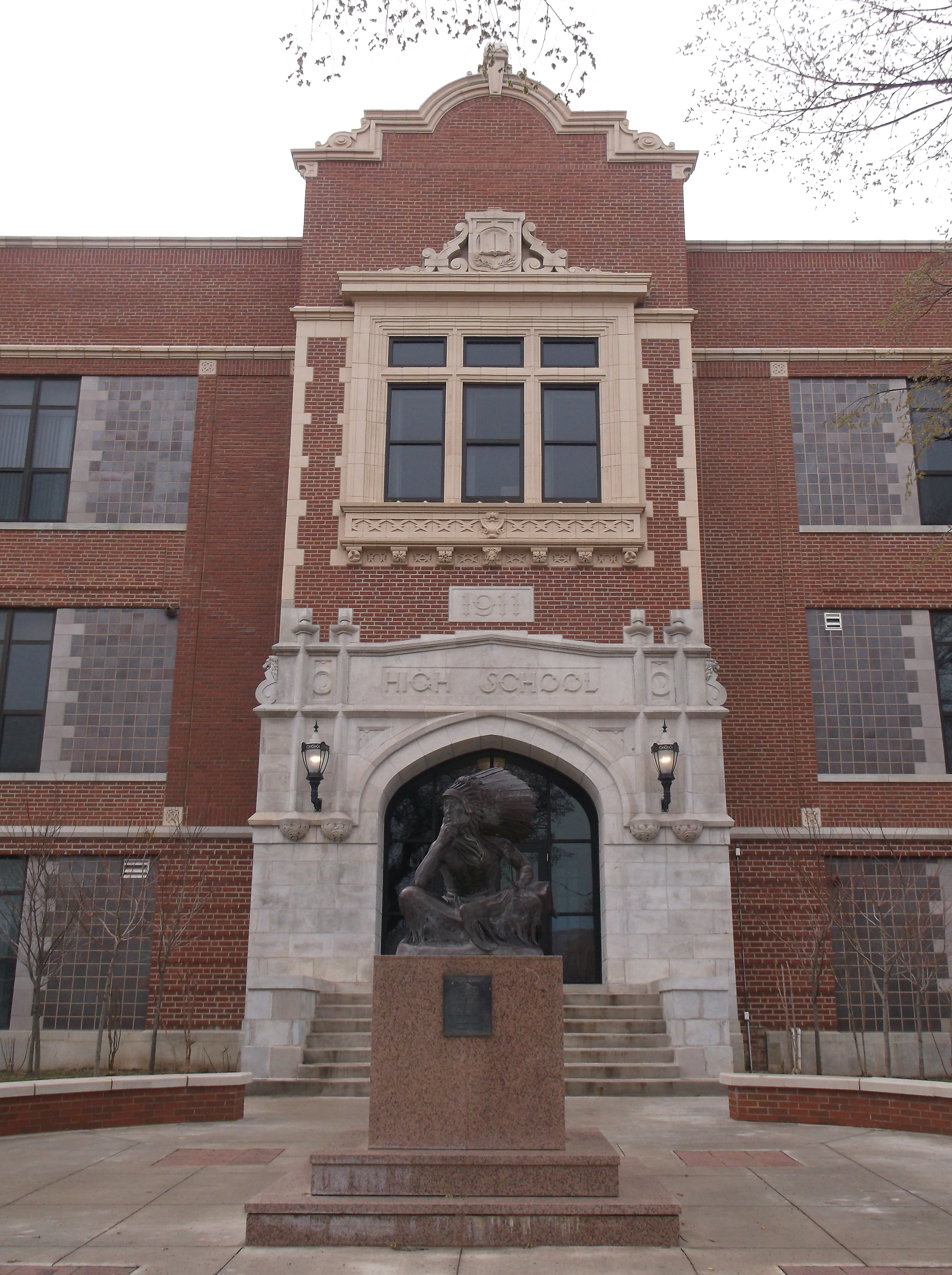
Front of Enid High School

- Enid High School
- Emerson Middle School
- Longfellow Middle School
- Waller Middle School

=== Elementary schools ===
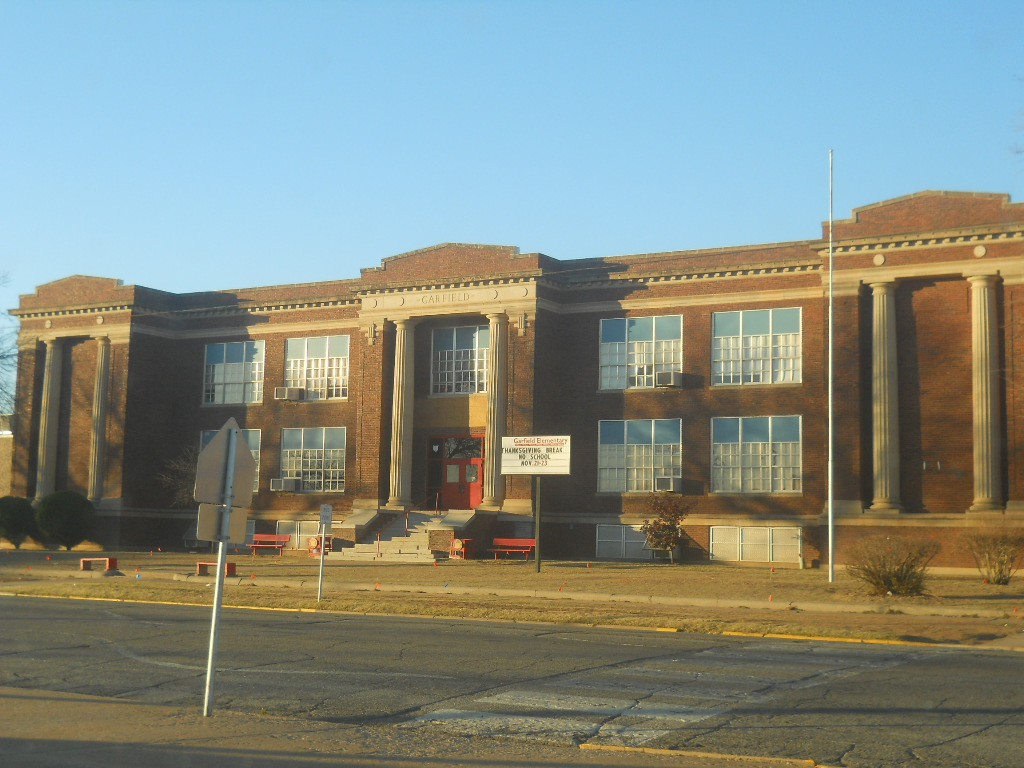
Garfield Elementary School

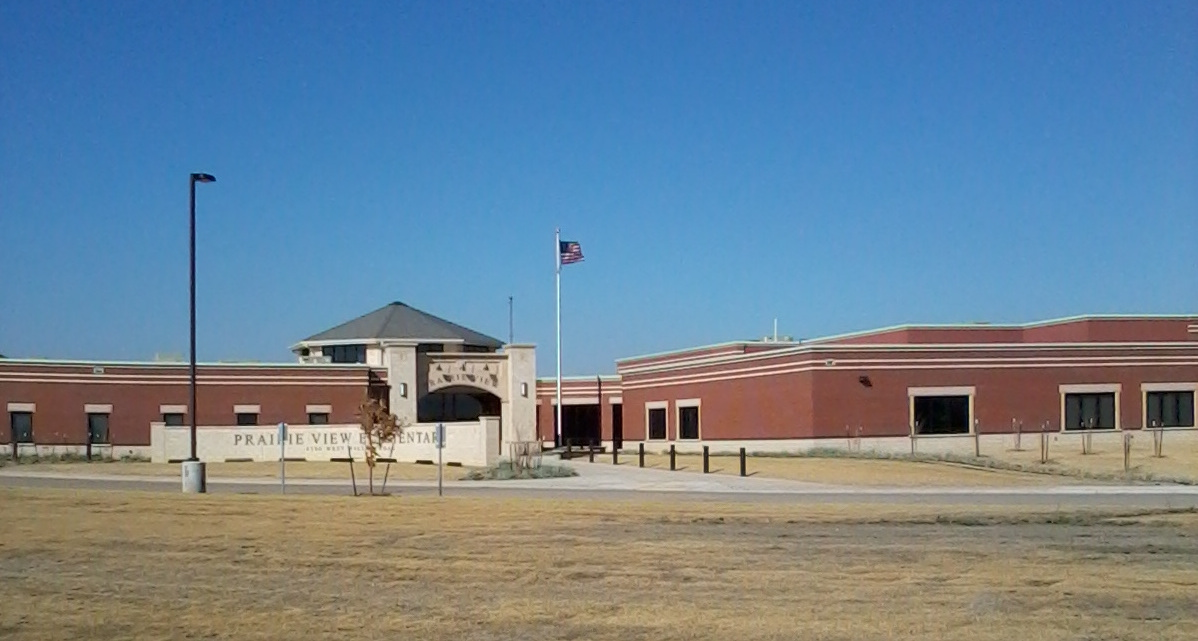
Prairie View Elementary School

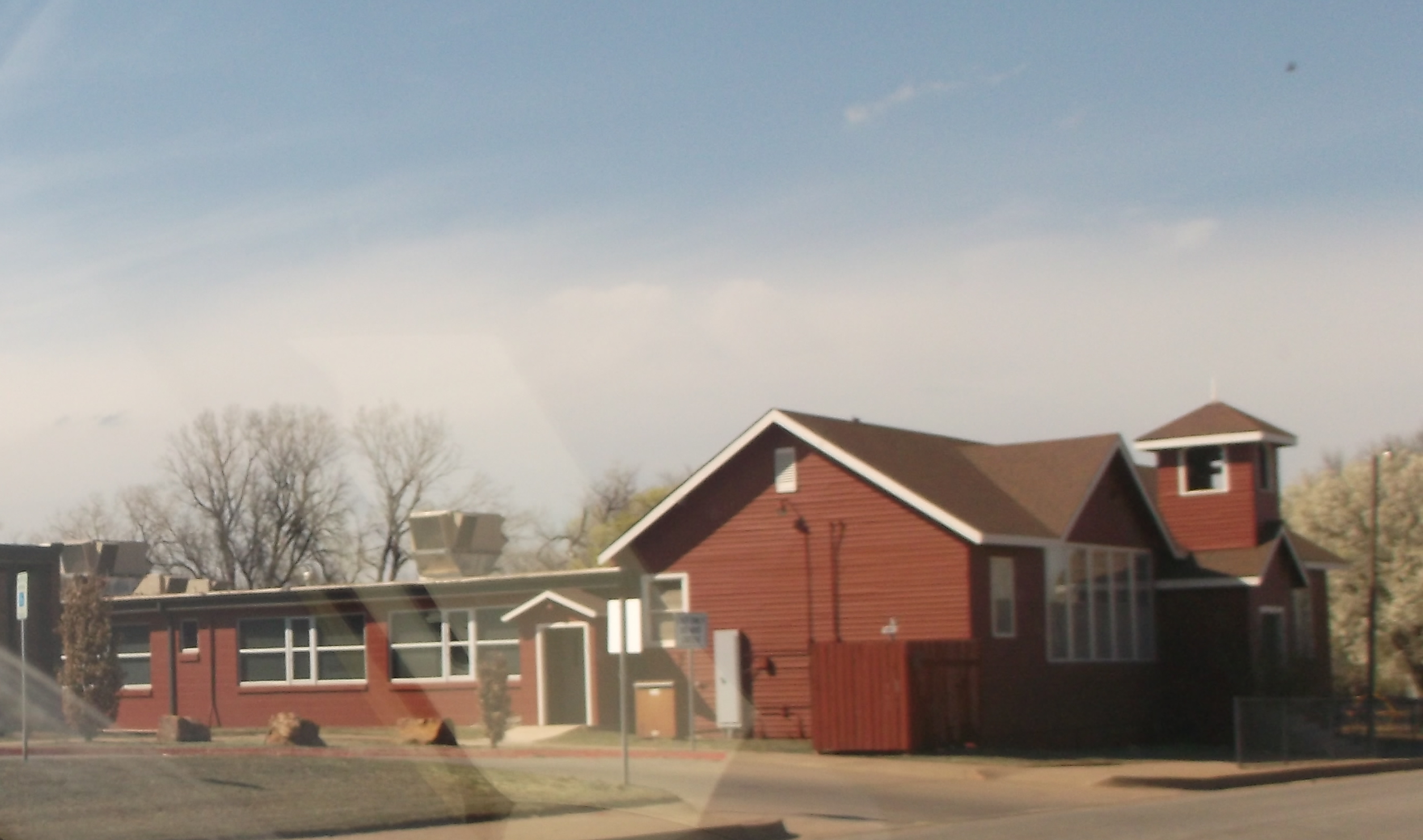
Little red school house at Glenwood Elementary

- Adams Elementary School
- Coolidge Elementary School
- Eisenhower Elementary School
  - This school is located on Vance Air Force Base.
- Garfield Elementary School
- Glenwood Elementary School
- Hayes Elementary School
- Hoover Elementary School
- McKinley Elementary School
- Monroe Elementary School
- Prairie View Elementary School
- Taft Elementary School

=== Alternative education ===
- Lincoln Academy

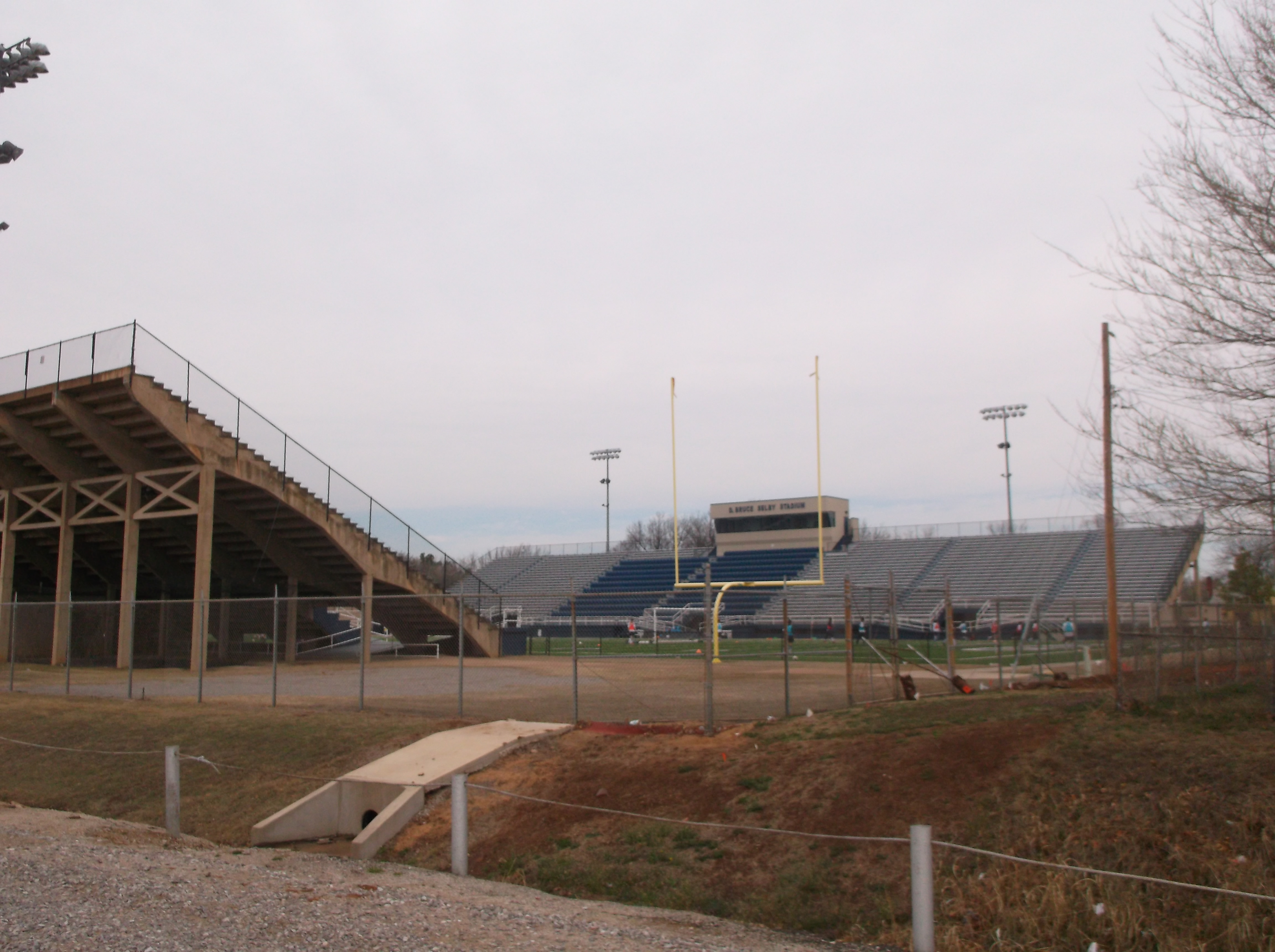
D Bruce Selby Football Stadium

== Historical schools ==
Enid's first school began on March 12, 1894. Central, Jefferson and East Hill (now known as Garfield) were Enid's first educational institutions.

Glenwood Elementary is also notable as one of the region's oldest schools. Glenwood and the "Little Red Schoolhouse" was founded as a rural school district only weeks after the opening of the Cherokee Strip in 1893. The school was annexed to the Enid Public Schools in 1964. It was started in a dugout on the old Glenn farm west of Enid. It was originally located about a quarter mile west of its current site, on what was the Walter O. Beebe farm. The current A frame building, the "Little Red Schoolhouse", was constructed in 1895. In 1915, the building was taken apart, transported by wagon, and reassembled on its current site. Modern additions were constructed in 1958, 1962 and 1964.

Roosevelt Elementary school was built in 1925 and later demolished. Wilson School was built in 1937.

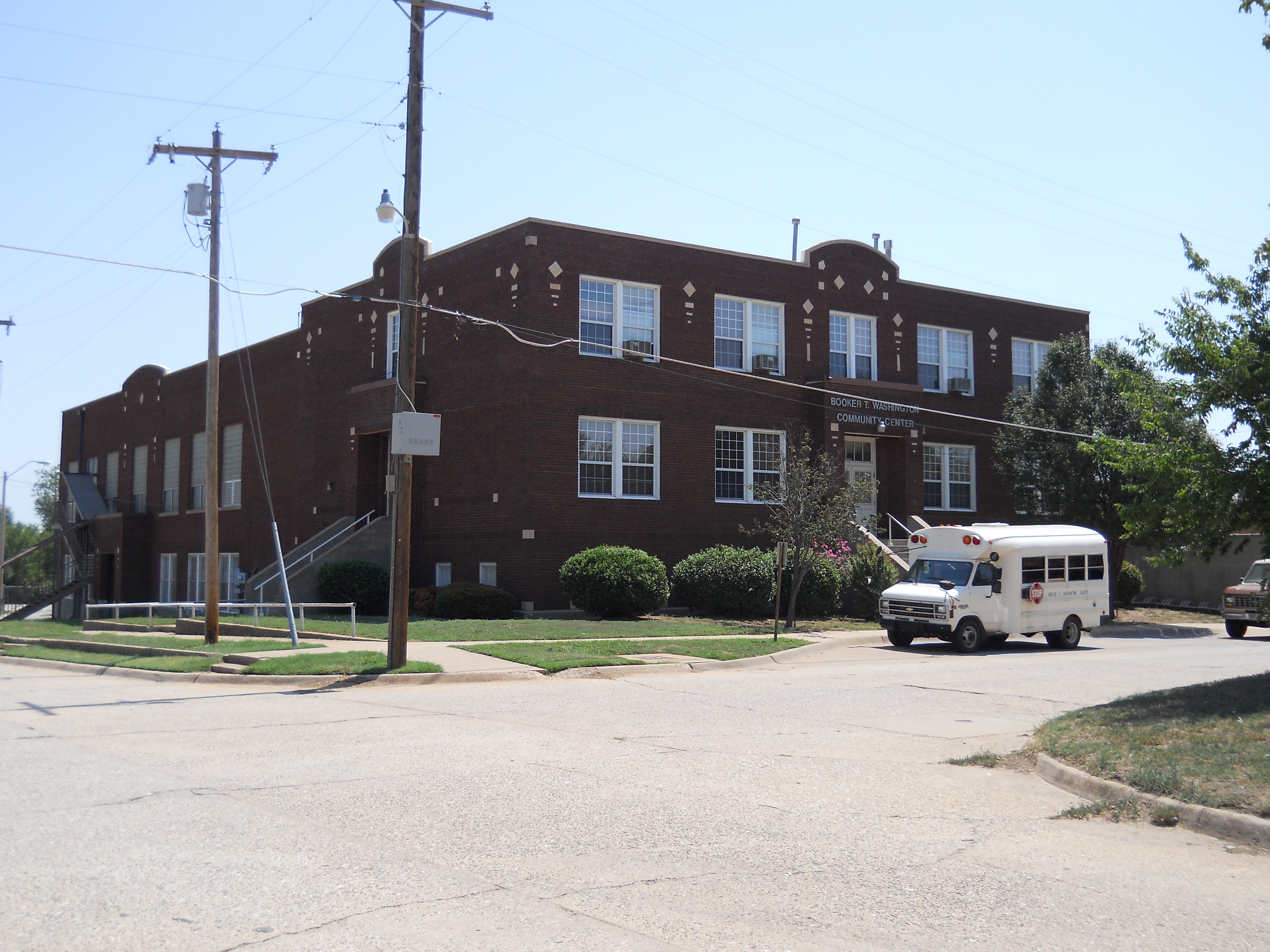
The former Booker T. Washington High School is now a community center.

=== Segregation ===
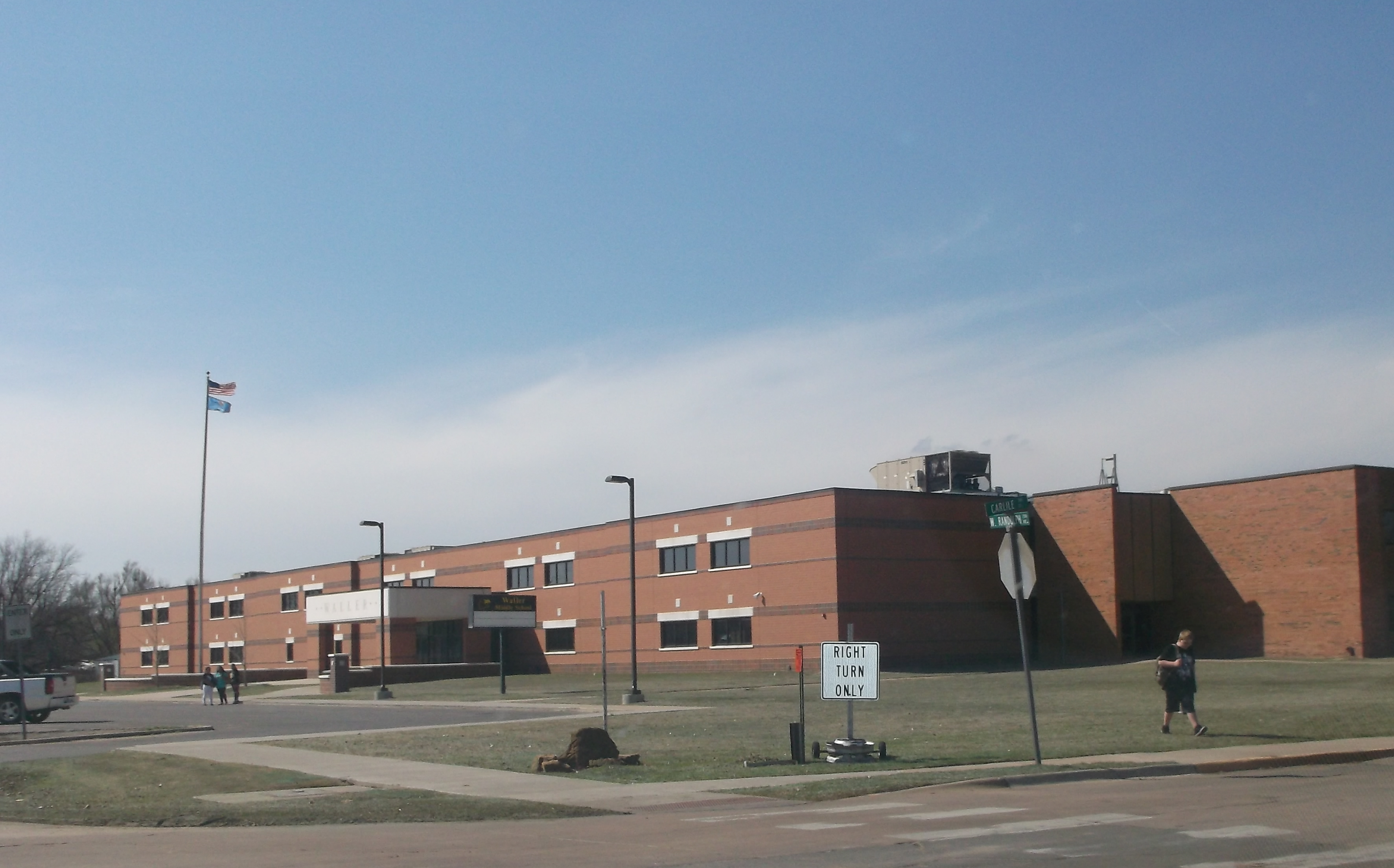
Waller Middle School in Enid, Oklahoma

Oklahoma schools became segregated with statehood in 1907, including Enid Public Schools. Booker T. Washington and George Washington Carver were the city's black schools during the period of segregation. Washington school, founded in 1896, and instructing students of all grades, was originally located near Government Springs Park at the current location of the Cherokee Strip Regional Heritage Center, but moved to a larger building on 5th street in 1921. Carver elementary school was constructed in 1949 as an all black school. A third school, encompassing grades 1-8, Douglas School operated from 1918 to 1920.

Enid Public Schools were integrated in 1959. From 1967 to 1969, Jackson and Carver split grades 1-3 and 4-6, respectively, between the two schools. Both of these schools closed in 1969. Jackson School, originally an all-white school built in 1936 and designed by the architect Roy Shaw, is listed on the National Register of Historic Places. Shaw also designed several other Enid school buildings including Enid High, Adams, Garfield, Roosevelt and Longfellow. Following integration in the 1970s, Carver High School became Carver Educational Center and Washington became the Booker T. Washington Community Center.
