= Quraysh Ali Lansana =

American poet

- Born: Ron Myles; September 13, 1964 (age 62); Enid, Oklahoma, U.S.
- Education: Enid High School (1982); University of Oklahoma (journalism, no degree); Chicago State University (B.A., African American Studies); New York University (M.F.A., creative writing)
- Occupations: Poet; Professor; Editor; Civil rights historian
- Years active: 1995–present
- Employer: University of Tulsa
- Notable work: The Skin of Dreams (2019); They Shall Run: Harriet Tubman Poems (2004); The Breakbeat Poets (editor, 2015); Opal's Greenwood Oasis (2021)
- Spouse: Emily Hooper (m. 1996, divorced)
- Awards: Wallace W. Douglas Distinguished Service Award (1999); Henry Blakely Award (1999); Tulsa Artist Fellowship (2022)

Quraysh Ali Lansana (born Ron Myles September 13, 1964, Enid, Oklahoma) is an American poet, book editor, civil rights historian, and professor. He has authored 20 books. Since 2023, he has worked as an associate professor of English at The University of Tulsa. Lansana is co-creator and executive producer of "Focus: Black Oklahoma," a monthly radio program on the public radio station KOSU.

== Early life and education ==
Born Ron Myles in Enid, Oklahoma, on September 13, 1964, he graduated Enid High School in 1982. Prior to focusing on poetry, in the 1980s he studied broadcast journalism at the University of Oklahoma. After getting a job as an assignment editor at KWTV, Lansana dropped out of college. He was fired from the station a year later for tardiness. After spending a year living in Medicine Park, Oklahoma, Lansana decided to move to Chicago in 1988. There he worked as an editor for Glencoe/McGraw-Hill, and founded Nappyhead Press.

Lansana grew up in the African Methodist Episcopal Church, but changed his name to Quraysh Ali after converting to Islam in 1993, and adopted the last name Lansana upon marriage to now ex-wife Emily Hooper in 1996. He practiced Islam until 1999, later also turning to African faiths such as Yoruba and attending Trinity United Church of Christ in Chicago.

He returned to school in 1996, earning his B.A. in African American Studies at Chicago State University where Gwendolyn Brooks was his mentor. Lansana holds an M.F.A. in creative writing from New York University.

== Teaching career ==
Lansana has taught at the Juilliard School, the School of the Art Institute of Chicago, Oklahoma City University, and was the director of the Gwendolyn Brooks Center for Black Literature and Creative Writing at Chicago State University. He previously worked as the acting director for the Center for Truth, Racial Healing and Transformation, Writer in Residence for the Center for Poets & Writers, and as a professor of Africana Studies and English at Oklahoma State University-Tulsa. Since 2023, Lansana has worked at the University of Tulsa, where he is an Applied Associate Professor of English & Creative Writing, and of Media and Communication. Since 2025, he has served as Executive Producer and Faculty Advisor for the student-run weekly live news program TUTV.

== Historical research ==
As a historian Lansana has extensively researched the 1921 Tulsa race massacre. For the centennial of the tragedy, he helped create an exhibit at Tulsa's Philbrook Museum of Art, taught workshops at OSU-Tulsa, worked with the History Channel, WYNC Studios, and KOSU to create Blindspot: Tulsa Burning podcast, and hosted the documentary Tulsa Race Massacre: 100 Years Later which broadcast on OETA. Lansana also wrote a children's book about the Greenwood District with Najah-Amatullah Hylton and illustrator Skip Hill entitled Opal’s Greenwood Oasis.

== Awards ==
In 1999 he won the Wallace W. Douglas Distinguished Service Award and the Henry Blakely Award, was nominated for the NAACP Image Award in 2012, and was named the Chicago Black Book Fair's Poet of the Year in 2000. He also received a Tulsa Artist Fellowship to create Focus: Black Oklahoma for NPR affiliate KWGS, where he serves as Executive Producer. Lansana is a contributing editor for Oklahoma Today magazine.

== Works ==
=== Poetry collections ===
- The Skin of Dreams: new and collected poems 1995-2018 (2019)
- A Gift from Greensboro Penny Candy Books. (2016)
- with Christopher Stewart, The Walmart Republic Mongrel Empire Press (2014)
- mystic turf Willow Books (2012)
- They Shall Run: Harriet Tubman Poems Third World Press (2004)
- Southside Rain Third World Press (2000)

=== Chapbooks ===
- reluctant minivan (2014)
- bloodsoil sooner red. (2009)
- Greatest Hits: 1995-2005 (2006)
- cockroach children: corner poems and street psalms (1995)

=== Children's books ===
- The Big World Addison Wesley (1999)
- with Skip Hill, Gift From Greensboro Penny Candy Books (2021)
- with Najah-amatullah Hylton and Skip Hill, Opal's Greenwood Oasis The Calliope Group Ltd (2021)

=== Editor ===
- African American Literature Reader Glencoe/McGraw-Hill. (2001)
- I Represent Gallery 37, Chicago, IL (1996)
- dream in yourself Gallery 37, Chicago, IL (1997)
- with Georgia A. Popoff, Our Difficult Sunlight: A Guide to Poetry, Literacy & Social Justice in Classroom & Community Teachers & Writers Collaborative (2011)
- The Breakbeat Poets: New American Poetry in the Age of Hip Hop Haymarket Books (2015)
- Medina, Tony., Bashir, Samiya A, and Lansana, Quraysh Ali. Role Call : A Generational Anthology of Social and Political Black Art & Literature. Chicago: Third World, 2002.
- with Georgia A. Popoff, The Whiskey of Our Discontent: Gwendolyn Brooks as Conscience and Change Agent Haymarket Books, 2017.
- with Sandra Jackson-Opoku, Revise the Psalm: Work Celebrating the Writing of Gwendolyn Brooks Curbside Splendor Publishing, 2017.
