= Charlotte De Clue =

- Born: 1946 (age 79–80); Enid, Oklahoma
- Citizenship: Osage Nation, United States
- Occupation: Poet
- Notable work: "Voices"; Without Warning<

Charlotte De Clue (born 1946) is an Osage poet. She is Washashe Osage via her mother and maternal family.

De Clue published two poetry chapbooks in 1985 and 1995. Her poetry focuses on themes of change, history and culture. De Clue's poems and imagery have referenced Osage traditional stories, as seen with imagery of Spider or tse-xo-be in her poem "Voices."

According to Studies in American Indian Literatures editors Elizabeth McDade and Robert Nelson, "Voices" has a "polyvocalized identity is from the very beginning that of the Osage people. Taken together, the nine voices of the nine stanzas comprising the text serially record a transformation of Osage identity."

Her poems have been reprinted in anthologies and magazines, including Songs From this Earth on Turtle's Back (edited by Joe Bruchac), That's What She Said: Contemporary Poetry and Fiction by Native American Women (edited by Rayna Green), Sojourners, Studies in American Indian Literatures, Sinister Wisdom, and A Gathering of Spirit (edited by Beth Brant). De Clue cites Simon J. Ortiz as an inspiration.

She also contributes to Concepts by Joe Harp Correctional Center.

De Clue read their poetry alongside Yuchi poets Richard Ray White and Joe Dale Tate Nevaquaya, Warm Springs poet Elizabeth Woody, Tlingit poet Robert Davis, and Kiowa Tohono-O'odham poet Alice Sadongei at the 1989 Modern Language Association of America Convention.

== Chapbooks ==
- Without warning. Strawberry Press. 1985. ISBN 0936574089.
- Ten good horses. Denver, Colorado: Howling Dog/Talon Recordings. 1995.

== Selected poems ==
- "Morning Song."
- "Yesterday Robin spoke to me..."
- "Place-of-Many-Swans."
- "Ijajee's Story."
- "the underside of trees."
- "To the spirit of Monahstah"
- "In Memory of the Moon (A Killing)."
- "Woolworths."
- "Young Wife."
- "Oklahoma you are the wind."
- "Voices."
- "The Fields."
