= Minnie Keith Bailey =

American poet and suffragette (1869–1953)

Minnie Keith Bailey (July 24, 1869 - March 19, 1953) was an American poet and suffragette. She was the first woman in Oklahoma to publish a poetry collection with her 1905 book, Life's Undertow. In 1906 she spoke at the Oklahoma constitutional convention in favor of granting women in Oklahoma the right to vote upon statehood. She was president of the Enid Suffrage Association, a vice president for the Oklahoma Equal Suffrage Association, and a delegate to the 1918 National Women's Suffrage Association convention. Bailey was one of 92 women to sew a 46 star, 12 foot by 20 foot United States flag for the state of Oklahoma for Flag Day in 1908 in Guthrie, Oklahoma.

== Early life ==
Minnie Keith was born near White Cloud, Kansas on July 24, 1869, to Uri Seeley Keith and Mary F. Grossman of Ohio. The Keith family were descended from Field Marischall Keiths of Scotland, and her ancestors emigrated to Bridgewater, Massachusetts in 1662. Her father and grandfather fought in the Civil War in Ohio and were related to Corporal Luke Keith who fought in the American Revolution. She was educated at the Atchison Institute, and received her B.A. from Western Normal College of Shenandoah, Iowa, graduating as valedictorian in 1888.

In 1889 she married John Roberts Bailey in McPherson, Kansas, and they had one daughter, Mildred. Her husband worked for the railroads and in grain distribution. They moved to Oklahoma in 1901, first living in Garber, then Enid from 1902 to 1917, and settled in Perry until her death in 1953.

Bailey was the first vice president of the Oklahoma Authors Club which became the Oklahoma Poetry Society, served on the Garfield County Council of Defense, organized the Betsy Ross Association of Oklahoma, and was a member of the League of American Penwomen, president of the Presbyterial church organization, and president of the Perry, Oklahoma Library board for 25 years. She was also involved with the Enid Shakespeare Club, Women's Relief Corps, and Alpha Chautauqua.

Bailey worked in the poetry department of the St. Louis Post Dispatch. Her poetry was anthologized in Poetry Society of Oklahoma's 1936 anthology, Poets on Parade for 1938, Poetry Parade for 1939, The North American Book of Verse (H. Harrison), Poems for Radio (1945) and the 1942 anthology of the Poetry Digest of New York City.

== Publications ==
- "My Garden" Covington Leader April 20, 1905
- "Retribution" Covington Leader August 17, 1905
- "The Best Way" Covington Leader September 7, 1905
- "Be Assured" The Burden Times October 24, 1907
- "The Ballot and the Babies" The Grain Growers' Guide October 5, 1910
- "The Call" The Enid Daily Eagle November 7, 1910
- "The Way to Happiness" The Hunter Enterprise November 18, 1910
- "Oklahoma" The Enid Daily Eagle December 15, 1910
- "The Gift of Fall" The Enid Events October 8, 1914
- "Oklahoma - A Beautiful Land" Implement & Tractor Trade Journal Volume 32, Issue 1 1917
- "Unfurl the Flag" The Enid Daily Eagle May 6, 1917
- "Can You?" St. Louis Post-Dispatch October 17, 1918
- "Life" St. Louis Post-Dispatch April 17, 1920
- "The Message of the Bulbs" The Enid Times April 17, 1924
- "Ties" The Enid Morning News November 30, 1924
- "Weavers All" The Daily Breeze July 30, 1943
- "Come Up Higher" The Perry Daily Journal March 17, 1953
- "Abiding Faith" The Perry Daily Journal March 17, 1953
- "Finale" The Perry Daily Journal March 17, 1953
- "On the Highlands" The Anniston Star April 19, 1954
