= Theresa Druley Black =

Theresa Druley Black (September 11, 1891 - April 3, 1968) was an American poet and educator.

Theresa Druley was born in Springfield, Illinois in 1891 to Alice Scott and Samuel Sherman Druley. Her family moved to Enid, Oklahoma from St. Louis, Missouri in 1905. She was educated at Enid High School, graduating with the class of 1911, and Phillips University, earning a B.A. in Education. She taught for 29 years at Lincoln Elementary School in Enid, Oklahoma. She was named Garfield County, Oklahoma's "Teacher of the Year" in 1956. She married William Glenwood Black and had a son Billy Glenwood Black, Jr.

Black was Oklahoma chair of General Federation of Women and served as Oklahoma chair for poetry, vice president, president, and historian for the Oklahoma City branch of the National League of American Pen Women. She was also active in the American Association of University Women and the Enid Writers' Club. She was listed in Who’s Who in Poetry.

Black had several poems published in England. Her poem “To One in Service” won first prize from The Denver Post and was published in Poetry, Vol. 16 (Mitre Press, Sardinia House, 1947). Her poem “Tall Candles” appears in Poetry, Vol. 10 (Mitre Press) and Spring Anthology 1939 (London). Her poem "The Creed of a Cadet" appeared in Poetry, Vol. 14 (Mitre Press, Sardinia House, 1944) She sent a 1947 Canadian nickel to Queen Elizabeth II, and it is stored in the archives at Windsor Castle.

Black was also published in Red Earth, Enid Writers Club Anthology (1958), Redbud in Poetry, Outstanding Contemporary Poets of 1939, Davis' Anthology of Newspaper Verse for 1934, Davis' Anthology of Newspaper Verse for 1935, Davis’ Anthology of Newspaper Verse for 1940, Paybar Anthology of Magazine Verse, Harlow’s Weekly, Poets on Parade, The Family Circle, The Grade Teacher, Teen Time, Pen Woman Magazine, The American Author, Blackwell Journal, The Oklahoman, Enid Events, Boy Builder and Oklahoma Teacher Magazine.

Black published a poetry collection entitled Silver Ships (Burton Publishing, Kansas City, 1938) with an introduction by Jennie Harris Oliver. From 1938 to 1942 she published a newspaper poetry column entitled In a Poet’s Garden for the Enid Events newspaper, featuring nature poetry, holiday poems, occasional poetry, elegies, and poems about her family, friends, and life in Enid, Oklahoma. She hosted a weekly poetry radio program on KCRC.

She died in Houston, Texas in 1968.

== Publications ==
- "Silver Ships" The Enid Events January 11, 1934
- "A Tribute to Mrs. O.J. Fleming" The Enid Events March 29, 1934
- "The Worker" The Enid Events August 13, 1936
- "The Conqueror" The Enid Events August 20, 1936
- "To Grant Utley the Minnesota Minstrel" The Enid Events September 3, 1936
- "A Winter Night" The Enid Events November 12, 1936
- "Quatrains for a New Year" The Enid Events January 7, 1937
- "Full Moon" The Enid Events March 18, 1937
- "Wishes" The Enid Events October 6, 1938
- "Music" The Enid Events October 20, 1938
- "Lessons" The Enid Events November 3, 1938
- "Trees" The Enid Events November 24, 1938
- "Etching" The Enid Events December 1, 1938
- "Full Moon" The Enid Events December 8, 1938
- "Home" The Enid Events December 29, 1938
- "To my son on Mother’s Day" Boy Builder, May 1, 1939
- "A Mother's Cry" The Enid Events January 5, 1939
- "Symphony of Life" The Enid Events January 12, 1939
- "Washington" The Enid Events February 16, 1939
- "My Soul" The Enid Events February 23, 1939
- "Little Stick Horse" The Enid Events March 2, 1939
- "The Weaver" The Enid Events March 9, 1939
- "Today" The Enid Events March 23, 1939
- "Red Buds" The Enid Events March 30, 1939
- "Dream On, My Son" The Enid Events April 13, 1939
- "Spring in Oklahoma" The Enid Events April 20, 1939
- "Farewell, Alma Mater" The Enid Events April 27, 1939
- "Mother" Boy Builder, May 1, 1939
- "Symphony of Life" Boy Builder, May 1, 1939
- "A Tribute to the Memory of Miss May McGill" The Enid Events May 4, 1939
- "In Memoriam" The Enid Events May 25, 1939
- "Our Flag" The Enid Events June 8, 1939
- "Tapestries" Boy Builder, July 1, 1939
- "To an Old Fashioned Garden" Boy Builder, July 1, 1939
- "Silver Ships" Boy Builder, July 1, 1939
- "This July Fourth" The Enid Events July 6, 1939
- "Mid July" The Enid Events July 13, 1939
- "Mid Summer" The Enid Events July 20, 1939
- "Boy Builder" The Enid Events July 27, 1939
- "Boy Builder" Boy Builder, August 1, 1939
- "August" The Enid Events August 10, 1939
- "Fulfillment" The Enid Events August 17, 1939
- "So Young!" The Enid Events August 24, 1939
- "Welcome" The Enid Events September 7, 1939
- "Delta Kappa Gamma" The Enid Events September 28, 1939
- "So Young" Boy Builder, October 1, 1939
- "A Boy’s Thanksgiving" Boy Builder, November 1, 1939
- "Drouth" The Enid Events November 2, 1939
- "A Boy Builder’s Christmas" Boy Builder, December 1, 1939
- "Winter Fairyland" The Enid Events, January 25, 1940
- "Youth" Boy Builder, February 1, 1940
- "My Peace" The Enid Events February 1, 1940
- "To a Scrap Book" The Enid Events February 15, 1940
- "Easter" Boy Builder, March 1, 1940
- "Golden Wedding" The Enid Events April 4, 1940
- "Character" The Enid Events April 18, 1940
- "Keep On" The Enid Events April 18, 1940
- "Play Ball" Boy Builder, May 1, 1940
- "To Mother" The Enid Events May 2, 1940
- "Here’s to the Daughter on Mother’s Day" The Enid Events May 9, 1940
- "Old Glory" Boy Builder, June 1, 1940
- "To the Graduate" The Enid Events June 6, 1940
- "Old Glory" The Enid Events June 13, 1940
- "Happy Birthday" The Enid Events June 20, 1940 ·
- "Oklahoma in June" The Enid Events June 27, 1940
- "Cloud Pictures" Boy Builder, July 1, 1940
- "Independence Day" The Enid Events July 4, 1940
- "Air Trail" The Enid Events July 11, 1940 ·
- "A Birthday" The Enid Events July 18, 1940 ·
- "Cloud Pictures" The Enid Events July 25, 1940
- "Air Trail" Boy Builder, August 1, 1940
- "Goldfish" The Enid Events August 1, 1940
- "Edmund Frantz" The Enid Events August 8, 1940
- "Gifts" The Enid Events August 15, 1940
- "Pottery" The Enid Events August 22, 1940
- "Redwoods" The Enid Events August 29, 1940
- "F. Everett Purcell," Boy Builder, September 1, 1940
- "Edmund Frantz" Boy Builder, September 1, 1940
- "Fossett Funeral Home" Boy Builder, September 1, 1940
- "A Teacher’s Prayer" The Enid Events September 5, 1940
- "Two Vacations" The Enid Events September 12, 1940
- "Cherokee Strip Pageantry" The Enid Events September 19, 1940
- "September" The Enid Events September 26, 1940
- "Columbus" Boy Builder, October 1, 1940
- "Beauties" The Enid Events October 3, 1940
- "Petition" The Enid Events October 10, 1940
- "Jennie Harris Oliver" The Enid Events October 17, 1940
- "Mother" The Enid Events October 24, 1940
- "Pioneer Woman" The Enid Events October 31, 1940
- "Marble Halls" The Enid Events November 7, 1940
- "Beth Ball" The Enid Events November 14, 1940
- "I Thank Thee" The Enid Events November 28, 1940
- "Tall Candles" Boy Builder, December 1, 1940
- "December Dawns" The Enid Events December 5, 1940
- "December Nights" The Enid Events December 12, 1940
- "Tall Candles" The Enid Events December 19, 1940
- "Day After Christmas" The Enid Events December 26, 1940
- "We Moved into Our House Today" The Enid Events January 9, 1941
- "Winter Sunset" The Enid Events January 16, 1941
- "A Little House" The Enid Events January 23, 1941
- "The Corner Stone" The Enid Events January 30, 1941
- "Rain" The Enid Events February 6, 1941
- "Conventions" The Enid Events February 13, 1941
- "Month of Heroes" The Enid Events February 20, 1941
- "The Old Story" The Enid Events March 13, 1941
- "Our President" The Enid Events March 27, 1941
- "Neighbors" The Enid Events April 3, 1941
- "Pioneer Teachers of Oklahoma" The Enid Events April 10, 1941
- "National President" The Enid Events April 17, 1941
- "Red Buds" The Enid Events April 24, 1941
- "Signs of Spring" The Enid Events May 1, 1941
- "Emaroy" The Enid Events May 15, 1941
- "In Memory of Miss May McGill" The Enid Events May 22, 1941
- "To the Graduate" The Enid Events May 29, 1941
- "In My Garden" The Enid Events June 5, 1941
- "Roses" The Enid Events June 12, 1941
- "A Birthday Tribute" The Enid Events June 19, 1941
- "Caravan of Writers" The Enid Events June 26, 1941
- "Pal" The Enid Events July 10, 1941
- "To a Water Lily" The Enid Events July 17, 1941
- "A Birthday" The Enid Events July 24, 1941
- "July" The Enid Events July 31, 1941
- "I Heard You" The Enid Events August 7, 1941
- "Phillips Lake" The Enid Events August 14, 1941
- "To Travel" The Enid Events August 28, 1941
- "Angelus" The Enid Events September 4, 1941
- "Clay Hall" The Enid Events October 16, 1941
- "Chief" The Enid Events October 23, 1941
- "Growing Tall" The Enid Events October 31, 1941
- "Homer E. Evans" The Enid Events November 7, 1941
- "Open House" The Enid Events November 14, 1941
- "My Cadet" The Enid Events November 21, 1941
- "Christmas Journey" The Enid Events December 12, 1941
- "Christmas Prayer" The Enid Events December 26, 1941
- "Memorial Chimes" The Enid Events January 9, 1942
- "In Memory of Lt. Lawrence Nelson Johndrow" The Enid Events June 12, 1942
- "A Birthday" The Enid Events July 24, 1942
- "A Tribute for Madison L. Perkins" The Enid Events January 22, 1943
- "A Birthday Tribute for Alice Shively" The Enid Events June 11, 1943
- "Broken Wings: A Tribute to the memory of Lt. Owen Kirby Warner" Aline Chronoscope September 30, 1943
- "Character" The Frederick Press October 31, 1963
