= Mark Potts =

American journalist (born 1984)

- Born: October 22, 1984 (age 41); Taos, New Mexico, U.S.
- Education: University of Oklahoma
- Occupations: Journalist; filmmaker
- Known for: Coverage of the 2015 San Bernardino attack
- Awards: Pulitzer Prize for Breaking News Reporting (2016)

Mark Potts (born October 22, 1984) is an American Pulitzer Prize-winning journalist and filmmaker. He was part of the news team covering the 2015 San Bernardino attack for the Los Angeles Times which earned him a Pulitzer Prize for Breaking News Reporting in 2016. He grew up in Enid, Oklahoma and graduated Enid High School and the University of Oklahoma. His films include Simmons on Vinyl, The Stanton Family Grave Robbery, S&M Lawncare, and Cinema Six, the latter of which had a cameo by Bill Hader.
