= William E. "Pinky" Newell =

William E. "Pinky" Newell, ATC, PT (June 22, 1920 – October 13, 1984) served as the chief athletic trainer at Purdue University in West Lafayette, Indiana and former executive secretary of the National Athletic Trainers' Association (NATA). Pinky Newell is credited with changing the profession of athletic training from a craft made up of dynamic characters to an allied health profession that is appreciated by the entire medical community.

He is acknowledged as one of the founders of the NATA. "When Pinky was the NATA executive secretary from 1955 to 1968, he was a one-man operation as far as administration goes", says Otho Davis, MEd, ATC former executive director of the NATA and former head athletic trainer for the Philadelphia Eagles. Pinky was seen by many as the "Father of Modern Athletic Training".

Born in Enid, Oklahoma he grew up in Stafford, Kansas. After accepting a football scholarship to Purdue University he played center for the Boilermakers from 1941 to 1943, graduating with a Bachelor's Degree in Physical Education. His senior year, Newell's advisers urged him to go to medical school. He ignored them and joined the U.S. Marine Corps instead. Newell was part of the 29th Marines, 6th Division, that helped take Okinawa in 1945. He was discharged in 1946 and enrolled in the physical therapy program at Stanford University in Palo Alto, California, 1947.

Re-joining Purdue athletics in 1949, Newell served as head athletic trainer and assistant professor in physical education, teaching athletic training classes. Newell's career was filled with many accomplishments, including serving as athletic trainer for the College All-Star Game sponsored by the Chicago Tribune in 1953, 1954, and 1957. Internationally he was an athletic trainer for the 1963 U.S. Pan American Team in Brazil and served as an athletic trainer for the U.S. Olympic Team in 1980 at Lake Placid as well as the Summer Olympic Games in Montreal. He also served as an athletic trainer for the modern pentathlon and boxing at the 1984 Los Angeles Summer Olympics.
