= Mark Enger =

American artists

Mark Enger (1963–2011) and Matt Enger (born 1963) are American artists. They were identical twins and frequently collaborated on projects until Mark's death from cancer in 2011.

From an Army family, Mark and Matt were born in Fort Sill, Oklahoma, and raised in various places around the world.

Matt and Mark Enger formed their punk band, The War Hippies, in 1986 and produced music, posters and clothing as well as live shows. They reformed the band in 1989 in New York and were reviewed in Melody Maker Magazine in 1993 for their performance at Max Fish bar on Ludlow Street in NYC.

Enger began showing his work with his brother Matt Enger at the Universal Limited Art Editions Gallery in 1990. Together, the brothers formed Exploding Sky, a studio on Ave. B where they made silk screen editions of their work as well as paintings. Mark and Matt worked with Kiki Smith, Donald Baechler, Keith Haring, and other New York artists producing and collaborating on prints and paintings. They also worked with internet personality Josh Harris on various projects including his "Quiet". Josh Harris's Quiet Project was located at 353 Broadway in New York and the Sub Basement was rented out after the project for their art studio, "Exploding Sky LLC" from March 2000 to October 2002.

Mark died of throat cancer in January 2011.

Matt's later projects include "Streets of Glory" the art of Mark and Matt Enger at the Christopher Henry Gallery in lower Manhattan, July 2012, and "Exploding Sky" solo show at Christopher Henry Gallery in 2014. As well as a pop-up art shop at the Amy Li Gallery in Chinatown in New York City in December 2014.

Mark Enger and his brother Matt are in the documentary D.I.Y. or Die: How to Survive as an Independent Artist
