= Government Springs Park =

Park in Oklahoma, United States

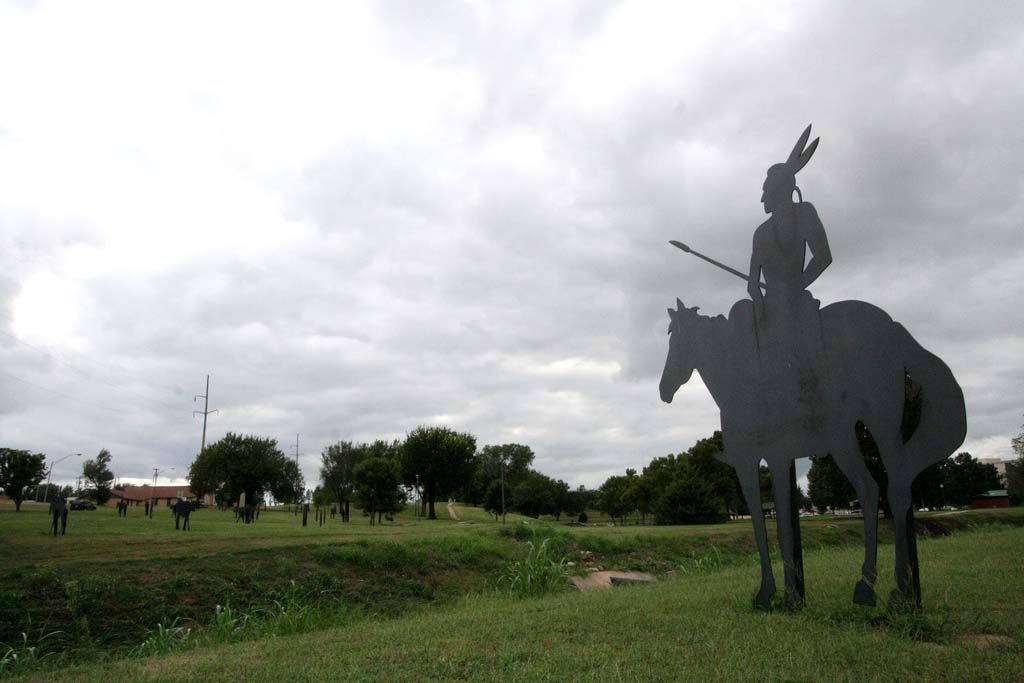
Local artist and photographer, Michael Klemme, erected metal statues commemorating the land run featuring longhorn cattle, a stage coach, horses, and a Native American mounted on a horse.

Government Springs Park is a park located in Enid, Oklahoma. Prior to Oklahoma statehood, the park was a natural spring used by Native Americans, and later soldiers and cattle drivers along the Chisholm Trail. Skeleton Ranch, (North Enid, Oklahoma) was another stop on the trail, served by stage coach lines after 1874.

A Garfield County war dead memorial is located at the northeast end of the park. Sculptures by Harold T. Holden within the park include: Holding the Claim, Plainsman, Chisholm, Wrangler, Boomer, Pioneer, and Dressing the Bit. Time capsules honor the Enid Springs Sanitarium, and the Oklahoma Centennial.

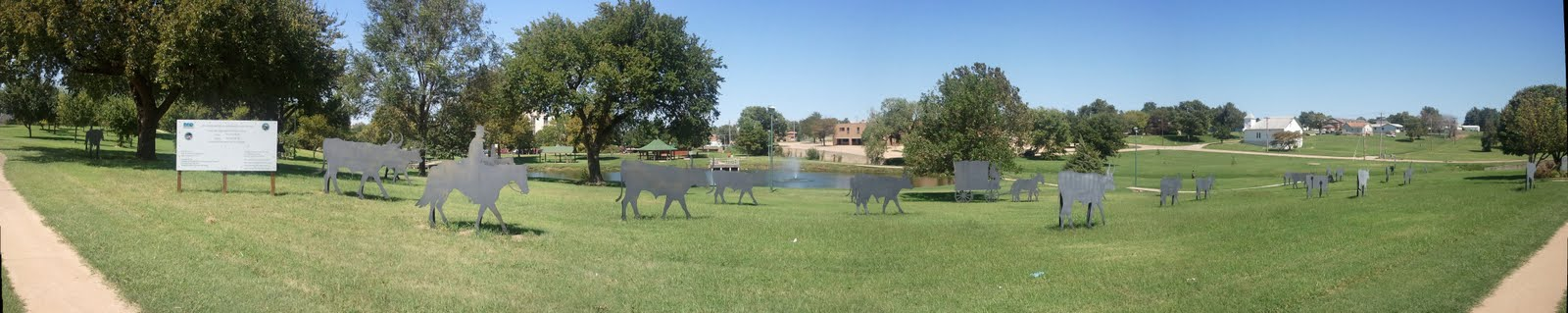
Panorama of Government Springs Park

== Gallery ==
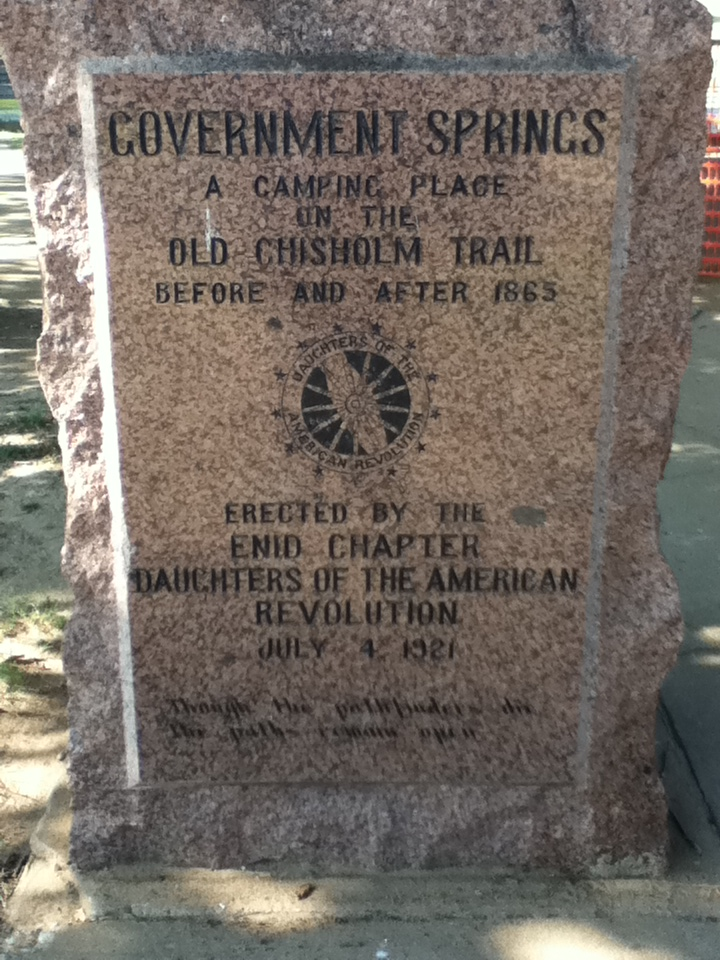
Monument by the Daughters of the American Revolution

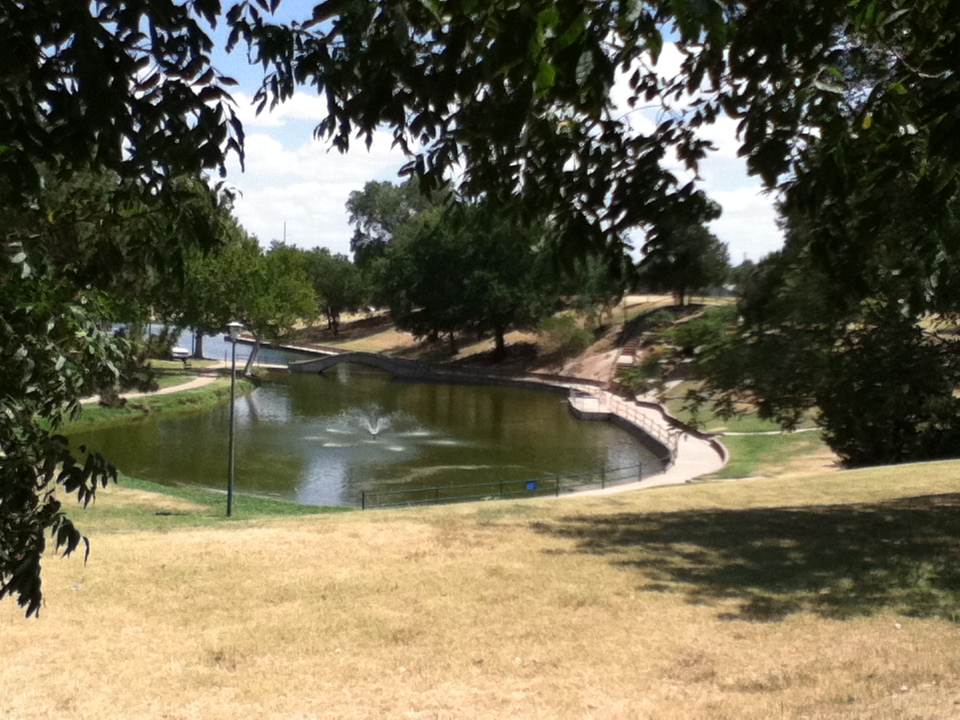
The Lagoon at Government Springs

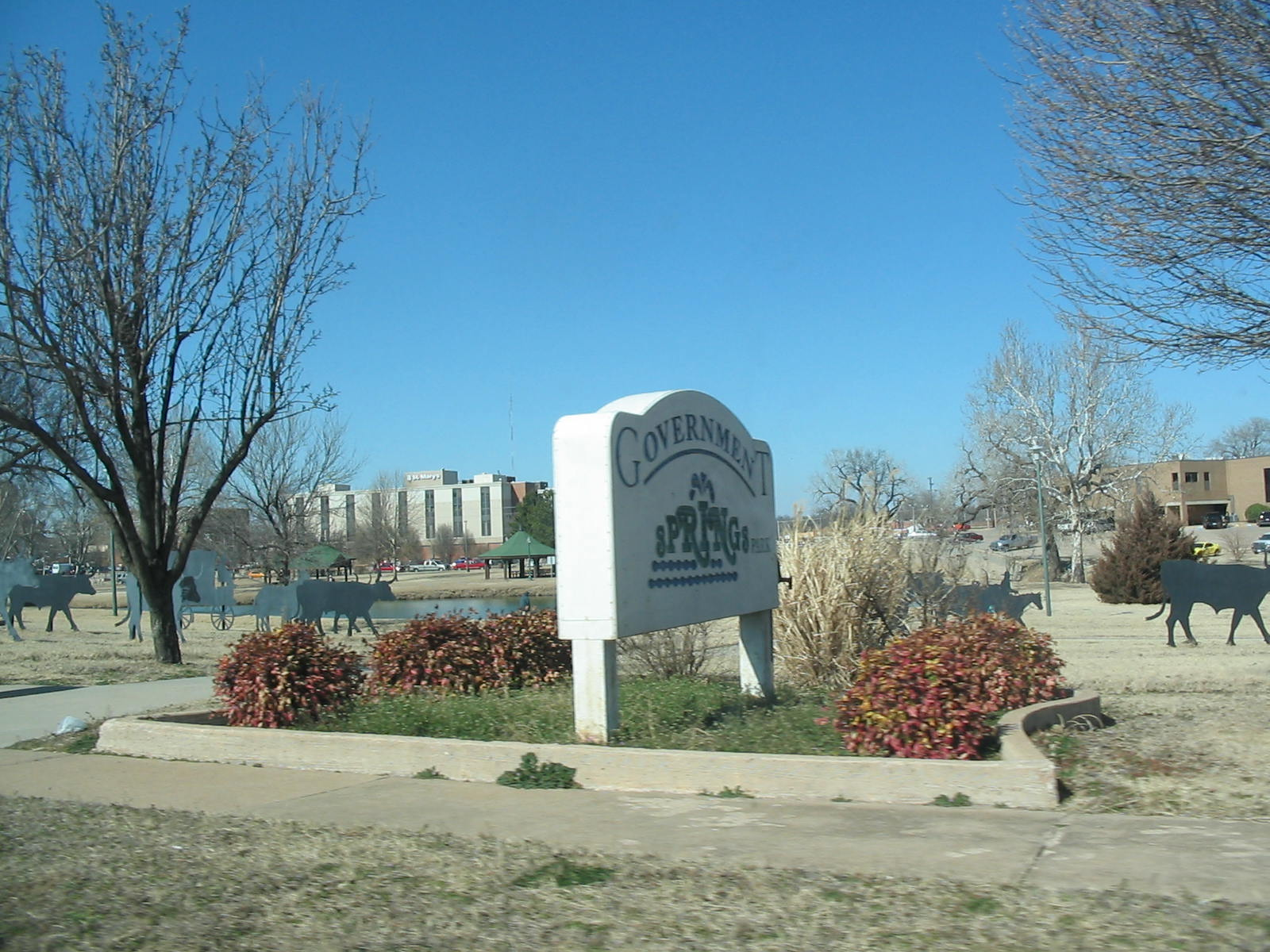
Government Springs Park sign
