= List of mayors of Enid, Oklahoma =

This is a list of mayors of Enid, a city in the U.S. state of Oklahoma.

== Mayors of Enid ==
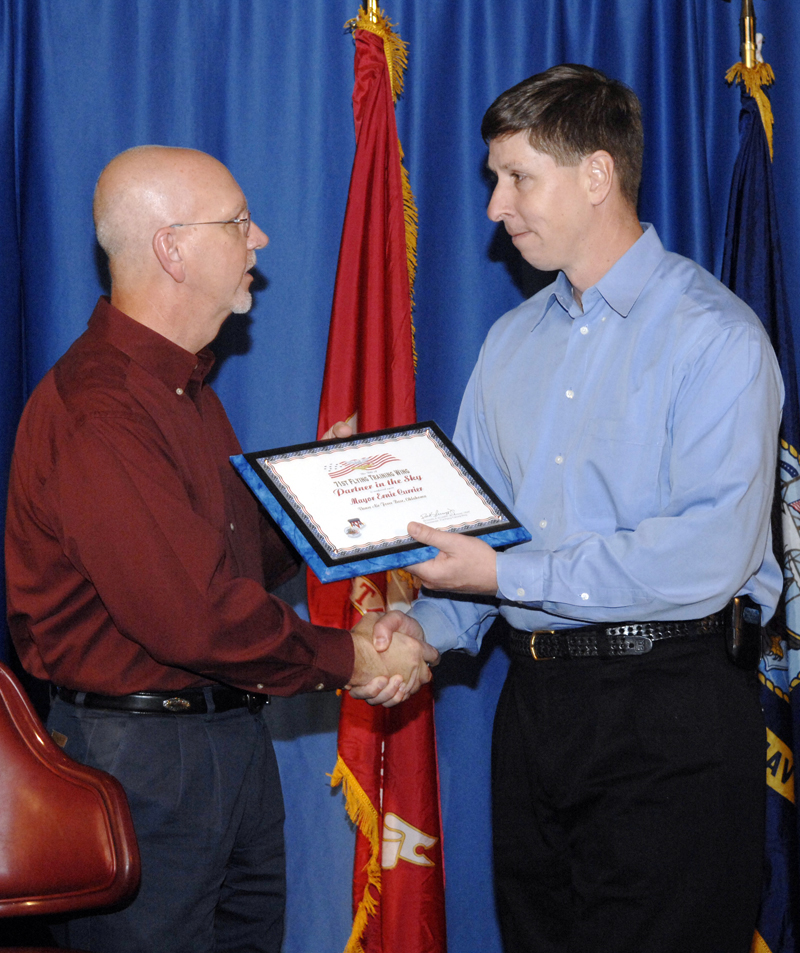
Enid Mayor Ernie Currier receives a certificate of induction as Vance Air Force base's newest Partner in the Sky

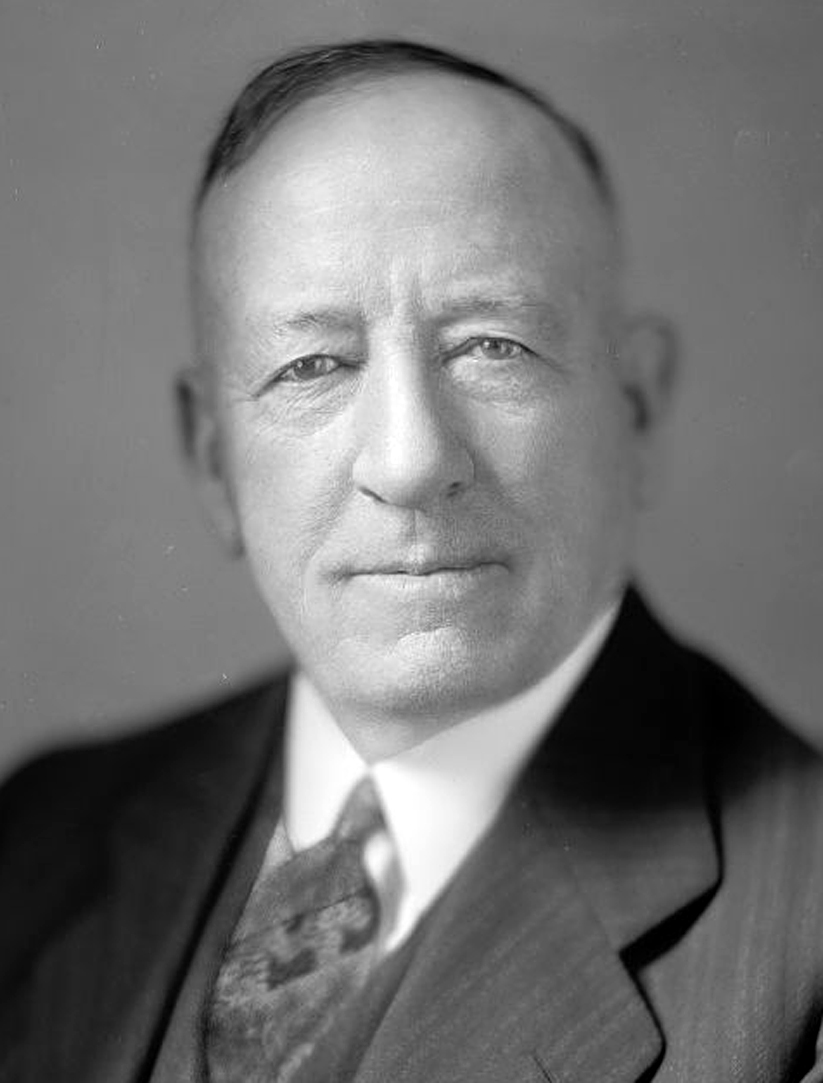
Milton C. Garber

Term start	Term end	Mayor
1893		John C. Moon
1894		James O. Fuqua
1894		Charles O. Wood
1895		S. R. Marshall
1897	1899	Joseph Meibergen
1899	1901	Joseph Meibergen
1901	1903	L. A. Faubion
1903	1905	John B. Linden
1905	1907	Peter Bowers
1907	1909	A. E. Stephenson
1909	1909	Walter H. McKenzie
1909	1911	C. F. Randolph
1911	1913	Peter Bowers
1913	1915	Peter Bowers
1915	1917	John R. Clover
1917	1919	Winfield Scott
1919	1921	M. C. Garber
1921	1923	William H. Ryan
1923	1925	John Carr
1925	1927	John Carr
1927	1929	D. D. Stull
1929	1931	Jesse T. Butts
1931	1933	J. A. McGill
1933	1935	Louis S. Morell
1935	1937	John J. Allen
1937	1939	John J. Allen
1939	1941	Charles L. Walker
1941	1943	Charles L. Walker
1943	1945	Luther A. Wells
1945	1947	Luther A. Wells
1947	1949	Frank Carter
1949	1951	Herbert Barnett
1951	1953	George Streets
1953	1955	George Streets
1955	1957	George Emrick
1957	1959	Bryson Berry
1959	1961	Bryson Berry
1961	1963	H. J. Bullard
1963	1965	H. J. Bullard
1965	1967	Leon Cook
1967	1969	Larry Black
1969	1971	Larry Black
1971	1973	Elbert Wheeler
1971	1973	Elbert Wheeler
1973	1975	Paul Crosslin
1975	1977	Paul Crosslin
1977	1979	Paul Russell
1979	1981	Paul Russell
1981	1983	John McMillen
1983	1985	John McMillen
1985	1987	Jim Underwood
1987	1989	J. Bruce Harvey
1989	1991	Walter L. Baker
1991	1993	Norman L. Grey
1993	1995	Norman L. Grey
1995	1997	Michael G. Cooper
1997	1999	Michael G. Cooper
1999	2001	Doug Frantz
2001	2003	Doug Frantz
2003	2004	Irvin Honigsberg
2004	2005	Ernie Currier
2005	2007	Ernie Currier
2007	2011	John Criner
2011	2019	Bill Shewey
2019	2023	George Pankonin
2023	present	David Mason
