= Kyle Dillingham =

American violinist

Kyle Dillingham is a violinist from Enid, Oklahoma who has performed in over 40 countries.

== Early life ==
Kyle Dillingham is the son of artist Diane Dillingham of Enid, Oklahoma. In childhood he lived on a farm in Waukomis, Oklahoma. Dillingham graduated Enid High School in 1997 and was awarded the Pride of the Plainsmen award in 2014. He earned a Bachelor's degree in instrumental performance from OCU in 2002.

== Music ==
Dillingham started playing violin at age 9. He played with Roy Clark in Enid in 1995, and first appeared on the Grand Ole Opry at age 17 in 1996. In 2019 he played violin at the Grand Ole Opry while riding on a skateboard. Teaming up with guitarist Peter Markes, Dillingham played concerts in Malaysia, Macedonia, Bulgaria, Korea, Singapore, Thailand, and Indonesia in the late 1990s and early 2000s. Markes and Dillingham met at the Oklahoma Summer Arts Institute while still in high school, and studied together at Oklahoma City University. In 2009 Dillingham represented the University of Central Oklahoma on a trip to Korea, and was named "Oklahoma's Musical Ambassador" by Governor Brad Henry. In 2014 Dillingham toured Liberia as an envoy for the state department. He appears as a jazz violinist in Scorsese's film Killers of the Flower Moon. Dillingham has also toured, backing Michael Martin Murphey. Edmond, Oklahoma named the Kyle Dillingham Community Arts Stage after him in 2022.

== Horseshoe Road ==
Kyle Dillingham formed the band Horseshoe Road in April 2005 with Dustin Jones and Brad Benge and recorded their first album Home Fires. The trio toured in Japan and Thailand and were filmed for an OETA documentary. The current lineup includes Peter Markes and Brent Saulsbury. In 2015 they toured Taiwan, Burma, Russia and South Korea for the U.S. State Department's American Music Abroad program. In 2017 Horseshoe Road toured in China, and they were the first American country band to play Dunhuang. In 2018 and 2019 the band toured Kosovo and Kuwait for the U.S. State Department's American Music Abroad program.

== Albums ==
=== Solo ===
- Behind Closed Eyes (2007)
- Very Kyle Christmas (2011)
- Gospel Fiddler (2012)
- Broken Beyond Repair (2015)
- Il Fait Beau (2017)
- At the Cross (2019)
- ’Homa (2023)

=== Horseshoe Road ===
- Home Fires (2005)
- Oklahoma Rising (2007)
- Reel-to-Reel (2008)
- Fear or Faith (2016)

=== Collaborations ===
- Kyle Dillingham and Dennis Dunham The Lions Waltz (2007)
- Kyle Dillingham and Andrea Dillingham Another Sunday (2011)
- Kyle Dillingham and Callen Clarke Demos & Premieres (2012)
