= Oklahoma Today =

- Categories: Regional magazine
- Frequency: Bimonthly
- First issue: January 1956; 70 years ago
- Company: Oklahoma Department of Tourism and Recreation
- Country: United States
- Based in: Oklahoma City
- Language: English
- Website: www.oklahomatoday.com
- ISSN: 0030-1892

Oklahoma Today is the official magazine of the State of Oklahoma, United States, published in cooperation with the Oklahoma Department of Tourism and Recreation. It provides its readers the best of the state's people, places, travel, culture, food and outdoors in six issues a year.

== History ==
Oklahoma Today has been in constant publication since January 1956. It is the state's longest-running magazine, and is the fourth-oldest regional magazine in the country.

Oklahoma Today's base circulation is 38,000 and is the state's third-largest paid circulation publication, coming behind only The Oklahoman and Tulsa World. It is the only statewide magazine and it is the only magazine with a paid circulation. Oklahoma Today subscribers live in all 77 counties of the state, other state's and many other countries. The magazine can be found on newsstands throughout the state and region.

Oklahoma Today received the "Best Magazine" award from the Oklahoma Pro Chapter of the Society of Professional Journalists in 2007.

Oklahoma Today will no longer be published after the November/December 2026 issue.
