= Laura Ella Crews =

American centenarian (1871–1976)

- Born: January 23, 1871; Pierce City, Missouri, U.S.
- Died: 1976
- Known for: Last living participant in the Cherokee Strip Land Run

Laura Ella Crews (January 23, 1871 – 1976) was an American centenarian known for being the last living participant of the Cherokee Strip Land Run.

== Biography ==
Laura Ella Crews was born on January 23, 1871, in Pierce City, Missouri, to Franklin Crews and Louisa Waddel. In 1872 the family moved to Chautauqua County, Kansas and her father died the next year. Members of her family participated in the Land Run of 1889 and the Land Run of 1891. She entered the Land Run of 1892, but did not file a claim. In 1893, she participated in the Cherokee Strip Land Run and staked a claim. She later discovered oil under her land claim and became quite wealthy. Although she never married, after her brother and his wife died she raised their six children. She died in 1976 at the age of 105.
