= Laura Crews =

Laura Crews may refer to:

- Laura Hope Crews (1879–1942), American actress
- Laura Ella Crews (1871–1976), American centenarian and last living participant of the Cherokee Strip Land Run
