= Ruth Monro Augur =

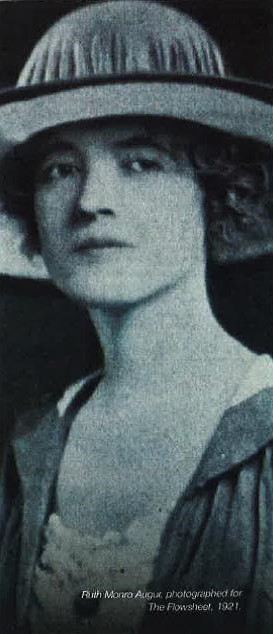
Ruth Monro Augur at the Texas College of Mines and Metallurgy

Ruth Monro Augur (1886-1967) was an artist of the American West, a journalist, educator, and a leader of the women's suffrage movement in Texas. Augur is best known for a series of murals depicting the Cherokee Strip Run that she painted from 1934 to 1937 at the Garfield County Courthouse in Enid, Oklahoma. Today, Augur is recognized for her depictions of horse studies, mountain landscapes, Army officers, cowboys, and Native American life that continue to sell at public auctions.

== Early life and education ==
Ruth Monro Augur, was born in Austin, Texas on November 14, 1886 and grew up in Denver, Colorado. Her parents were Charles Manwaring Augur, an U.S. Army officer, and Cecilia Hall Augur.

Augur won a scholarship at age 19 in 1905 to study at the New York School of Art and was a student of noted landscape impressionist artists Robert Henri and William Merritt Chase. Augur also studied in Denver at the Student School of Art, in Carmel, California at summer school, at the California School of Fine Arts in San Francisco, and the Otis Art Institute in Los Angeles.

== El Paso years, 1911-1929 ==
Augur came to El Paso, Texas in 1911 when her father was transferred to Fort Bliss. She lived in the city until 1929, working in journalism and higher education, with art being a secondary activity. Beginning in 1911, Augur worked as the Society and Sports Reporter for the El Paso Herald. In 1916, she became the Society Page Editor for the El Paso Herald and El Paso Morning Times.

In 1917, Dean Steve H. Worrell of the Texas College of Mines and Metallurgy, now The University of Texas at El Paso, hired Augur to serve as the school’s registrar. This was the first year that the school was at its current location. Augur designed the school’s first logo and seal, played cello at school functions, and in 1919 wrote and directed the first theatrical performance staged by students. Augur served as the registrar at the Texas College of Mines and Metallurgy until 1929.

=== Suffrage leader ===
In January 1915, Augur founded the El Paso Equal Franchise League (EPEFL) and presided over the first meeting of the women's suffrage association. The origins of the EPEFL were among a group of young women at Fort Bliss with Augur serving as an important link between women at Fort Bliss and like-minded women in El Paso who supported women's suffrage. Augur remained active in the EPEFL from 1915 to 1920 when the Nineteenth Amendment to the U.S. Constitution was ratified that granted women the right to vote. In 1925, Ruth Augur was elected an honorary member of the El Paso League of Women Voters in recognition of her role as the organizer of the suffrage movement in El Paso.

== California, 1929-1934 ==
Augur left El Paso in 1929 after the death of her father and moved to California. There she worked as an artist for magazines and as a producer, writer, and director of a touring marionette puppet theater group.

== Oklahoma, 1934-1967 ==
In 1934, Augur moved to Enid, Oklahoma after winning a Works Progress Administration (WPA) commission during the Great Depression to paint a series of six murals at the Garfield County Courthouse. The courthouse is listed in the National Register of Historic Places. The murals cover 1,136 square feet and depict the history of the Cherokee Strip Run of 1893 that opened the state to White settlement. When Augur completed the murals in 1937, they were the largest of their type in the United States.

Augur remained in Oklahoma the rest of her life and became a well known portrait and commercial artist in Oklahoma. She is recognized for her depictions of horse studies, mountain landscapes, Army officers, cowboys, and Native American life with accurate dress and accouterments. A series of her portraits are in the collection of the Oklahoma Historical Society. A lifelong member of the Episcopal Church, Augur also painted panels depicting the history of the Episcopal Church in St. Paul’s Episcopal Cathedral in Oklahoma City. In her later years, Augur belonged to the Oklahoma League for Conservative Art and taught at the Municipal Art Gallery. In 1962, she moved to Oklahoma City to head the art school of the Oklahoma Art Center. She left the center two years later to become the staff artist for Harlow Publishing Company where she worked until she retired in 1965. For 25 years she served as staff artist for Harlow Publishing Company. Ruth Augur died on March 10, 1967 in Oklahoma City at the age of 80 and is buried at Rose Hill Cemetery.
