= Enid Downtown Historic District =

Historic district in Oklahoma, United States

- U.S. National Register of Historic Places
- U.S. Historic district
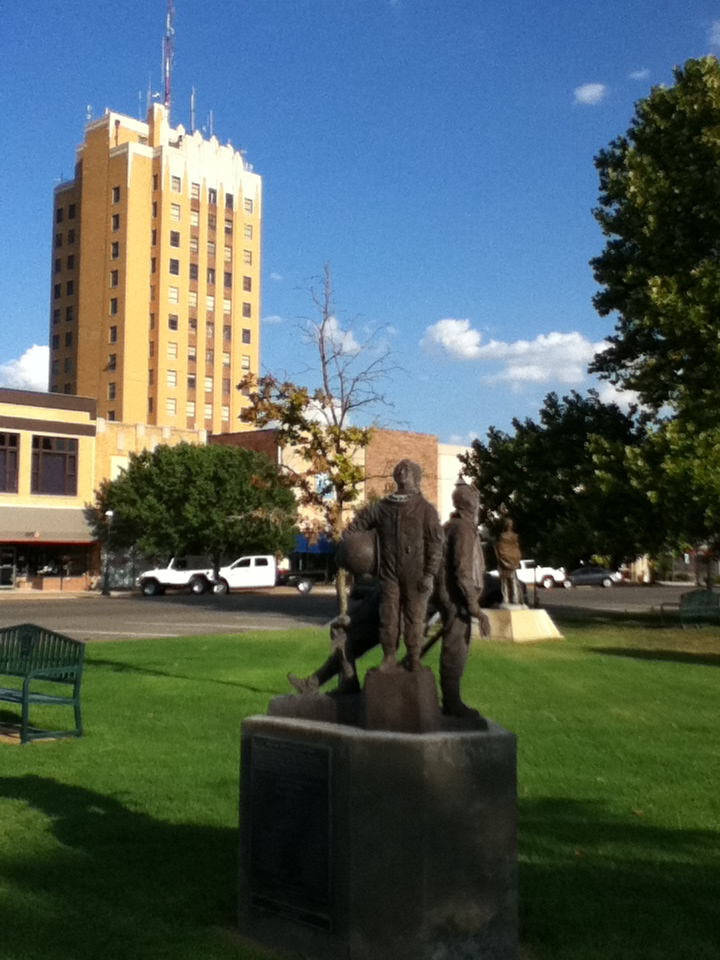

- Location within Oklahoma Location within the United States
- Location: Roughly bounded by Maple Ave., Cherokee Ave., Adams St., Enid, Oklahoma and railroad tracks
- Area: 296 acres (120 ha)
- Built: 1900 - 1957
- Architect: Layton, Hicks & Forsythe; Hawk & Parr, Don Wright, Louis A. Simon, Smith-Day, Davis and Davis
- Architectural style: Art Deco, Classical Revival, Commercial, Mission/Spanish Colonial Revival, Colonial Revival
- NRHP reference No.: 07001265 (original); 100004167 (increase)

Significant dates
- Added to NRHP: December 12, 2007
- Boundary increase: July 15, 2019

The Enid Downtown Historic District is located in Enid, Oklahoma and listed on the National Register of Historic Places since 2007. In 2019 the district was expanded from 7 blocks to 21. The district includes the original downtown plat from 1893, part of the Jonesville addition plat from 1898, and part of the Weatherly addition plat from 1902.

== Contributing properties ==
Notable contributing buildings in the district include:

- First National Bank of Enid, 201 N. Grand, 1922, Classical Revival
- Broadway Tower, 114 E. Broadway, 1931, Art Deco
- Enid Masonic Temple, 301 W. Broadway, 1924, Italian Renaissance Revival
- Woolworth building, 128 W. Randolph, 1921, Art Deco
- Montgomery Ward building, 102 W. Randolph, 1934, Colonial Revival
- Sears building, 116 E. Randolph, 1927, Commercial Style
- Shield building, 109 S. Grand, 1933, Mission/Spanish Colonial Revival
- Garfield County Courthouse, 100 W. Broadway, 1936, Art Deco
- United States Post Office and Courthouse, 115 W. Broadway, Classical Revival
- IOOF building at 223-225 South Grand Avenue, 20th Century Commercial style
- Public Library of Enid and Garfield County at 120 West Maine, New Formalism
- Enid Masonic Temple at 126 South Independence, Classical Revival
- Knox building at 303-305 West Broadway, Italian Renaissance Revival
- Security National Bank at 201 West Broadway, Modern Movement
- Pioneer Telephone and Telegraph building at 216-218 North Independence, Italian Renaissance Revival
- Billings Theatre at 122 N. Independence, Mission/Spanish Colonial Revival

Two statues are on the square also are contributing:

- Doughboy statue, 1924 (Note: Incorrectly listed as E.M. Viquesney's Spirit of the American Doughboy on application for Enid's National Register of Historic Places; see Smithsonian Inventory of American Sculpture record OK000196 for correct information.)
- Statue of Liberty, set up in 1950 by the Boy Scouts of America

== Jonesville, Oklahoma ==
On September 16, 1893, Walter M. Cook, a Chickashaw cowhand, mounted a pony at the Hennessey line, and arrived first at the Enid townsite, riding 18 miles (29 km) in under an hour. He kept riding, and ultimately, the 22-year-old claimed 160 acres (0.65 km^{2}) north of the town square.

He was then followed by others, including Albert Hammer, Ben F. Clampitt, and William Coyle. 300 squatters also soon occupied the land, calling it Jonesville, and platted the site as a separate town. Jonesville was bordered by Grand on the west, 7th Street on the east, Walnut Street on the north, and Randolph on the south which joined with the town square. The portion of Jonesville included in the Historic District is along East and West Randolph, north of the square. The property was estimated to be worth at least one million dollars in 1903.

C.M. Hobbs, Eugene Kenyon and Peter Bowers made up the trust for the Jonesville group. Clampitt, Coyle, and Hammer agreed to forfeit their claim in favor of a portion of the property if Cook lost his bid. Cook built a house on his property, but the land was also occupied by the houses of several squatters. Mr. Cook left Enid, put his house up for mortgage in order to pay the dispute's legal fees. Ultimately, he left for six months, seeking assistance from the Chickashaw Nation. He soon became ill with pneumonia, and came back to Enid, only to find his house demolished and his land overtaken by the squatters. As a result of his leaving town, the Department of the Interior judged that Cook had abandoned his claim, and the Jonesville party won. On March 6, 1895, the Jonesville citizens requested to be annexed by Enid. Enid City Ordinance No. 57, passed April 3, 1895 allowed Enid to annex Jonesville.

In 1898, at the age of 26, Cook became a Rough Rider in Cuba, as part of troop D. He toured with a wild west show, married, had children, and opened a steakhouse. Ultimately, Cook became a bootlegger when Oklahoma instituted prohibition in 1907, often going in and out of jail. Cook died in 1936.

== Gallery ==
Below is a gallery of some of the contributing buildings and objects.

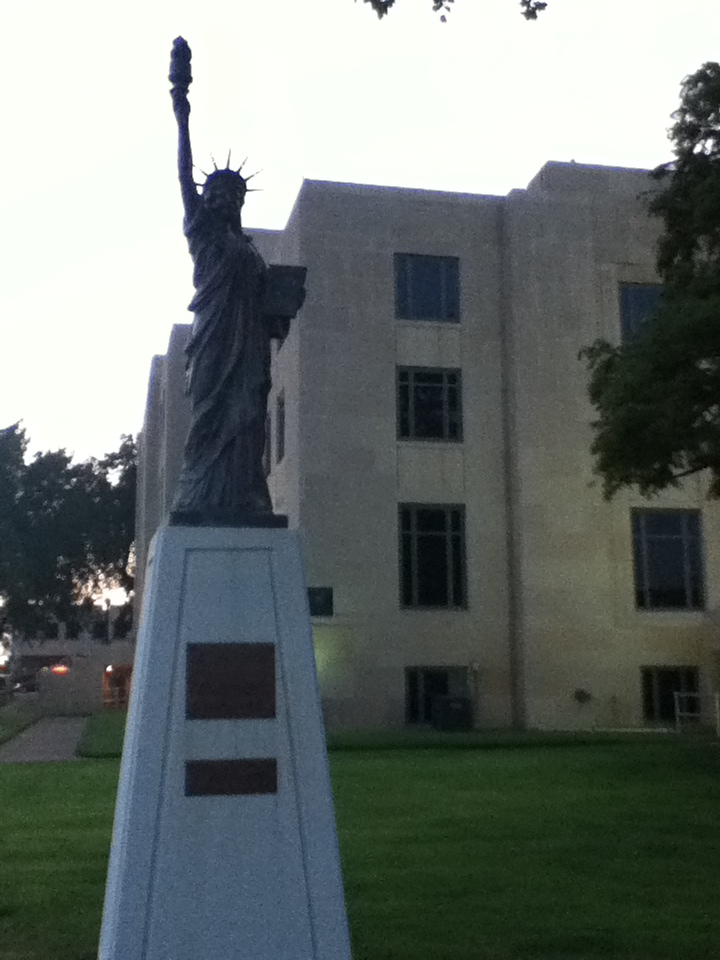
Statue of Liberty by the Boy Scouts of America

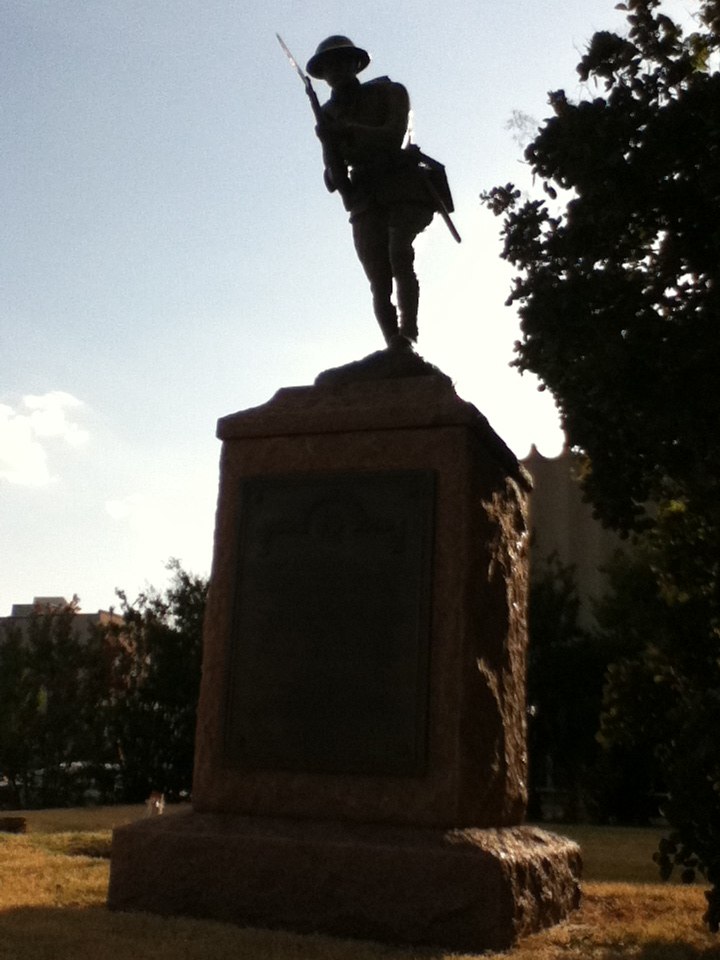
Doughboy statue on the courthouse lawn

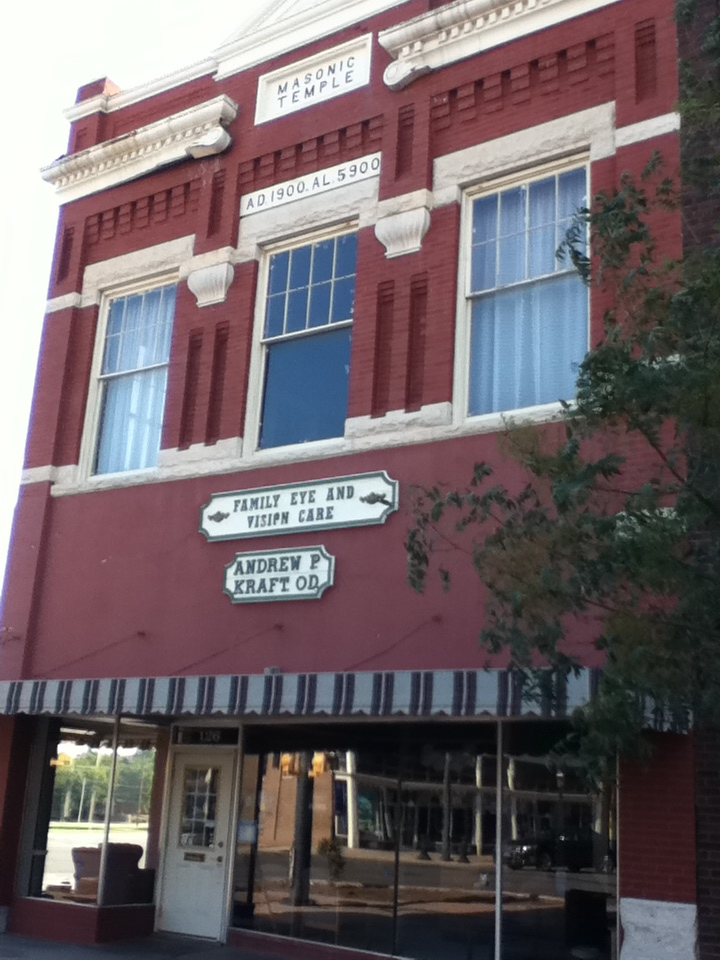
Enid Masonic Temple at 126 South Independence

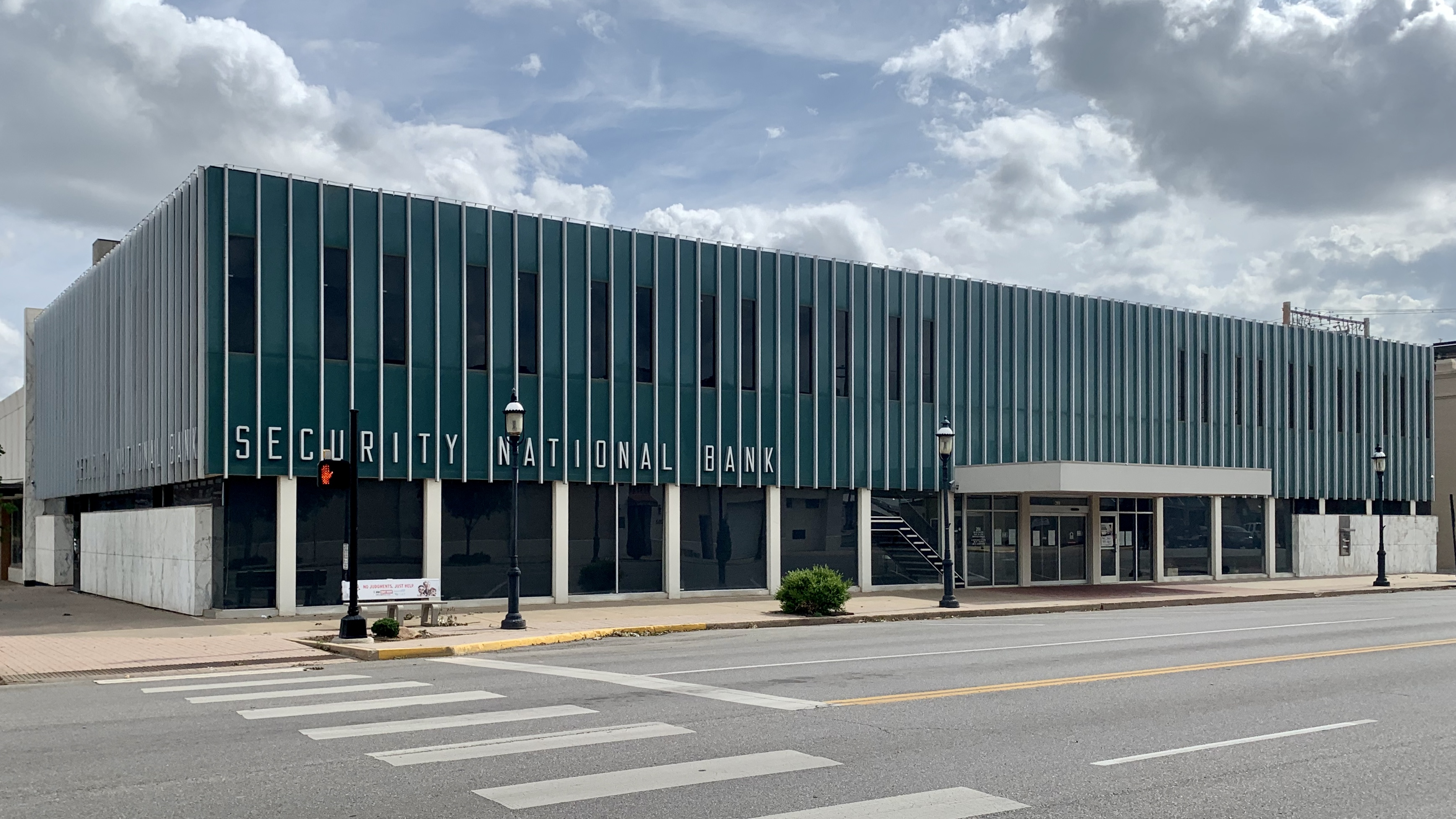
Security National Bank at 201 West Broadway

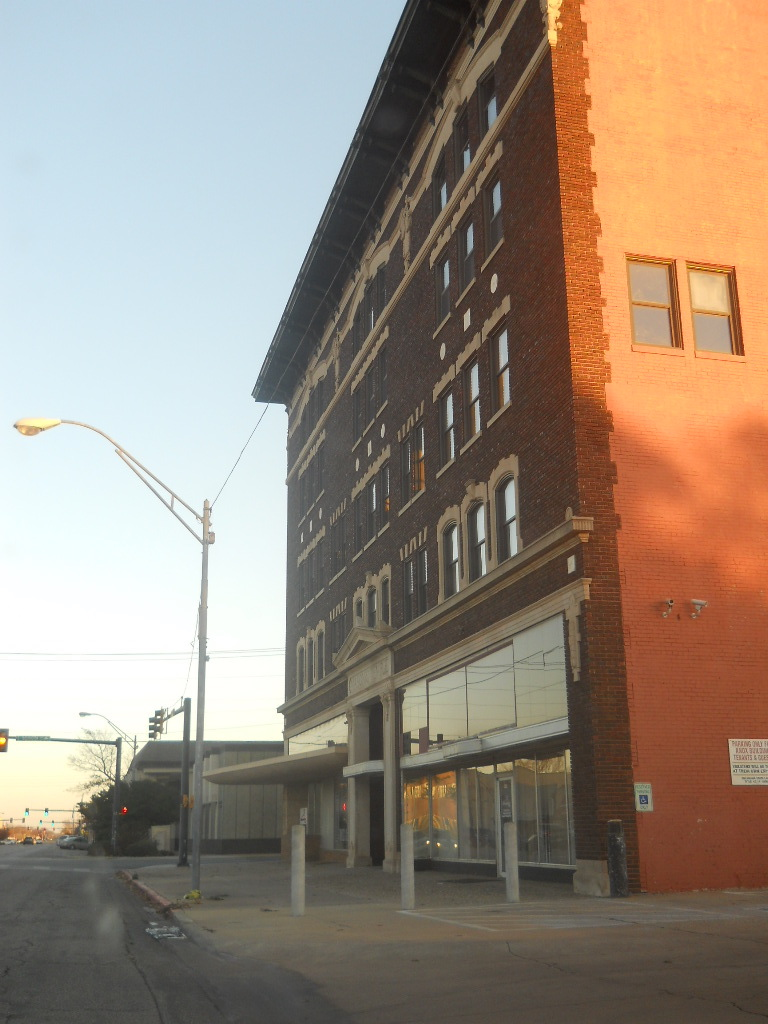
Knox building at 303-305 West Broadway

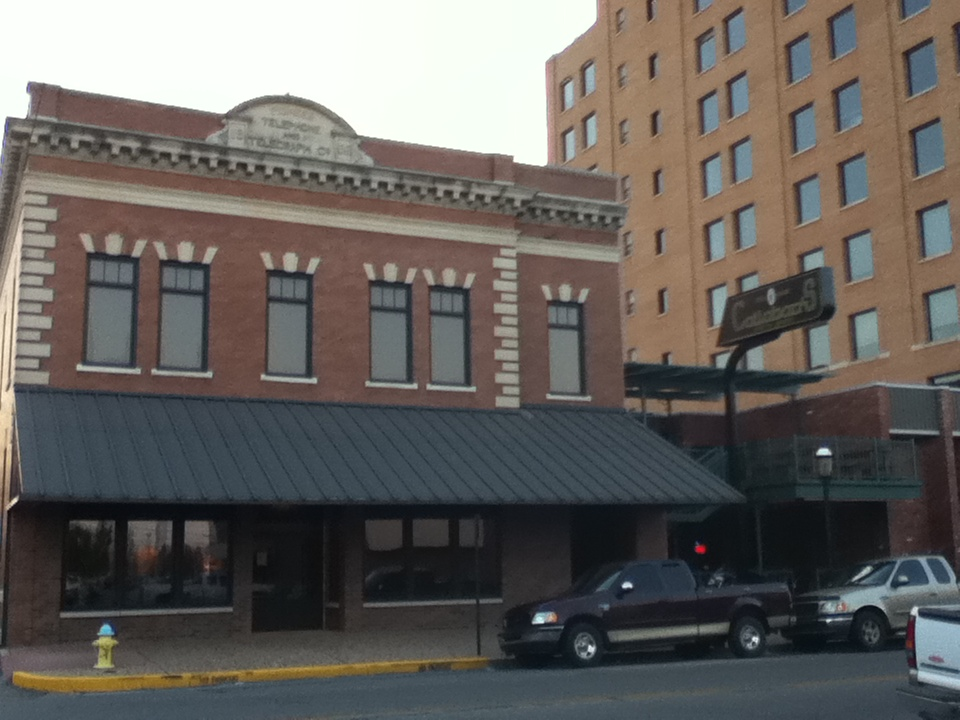
Pioneer Telephone and Telegraph building at 216-218 North Independence

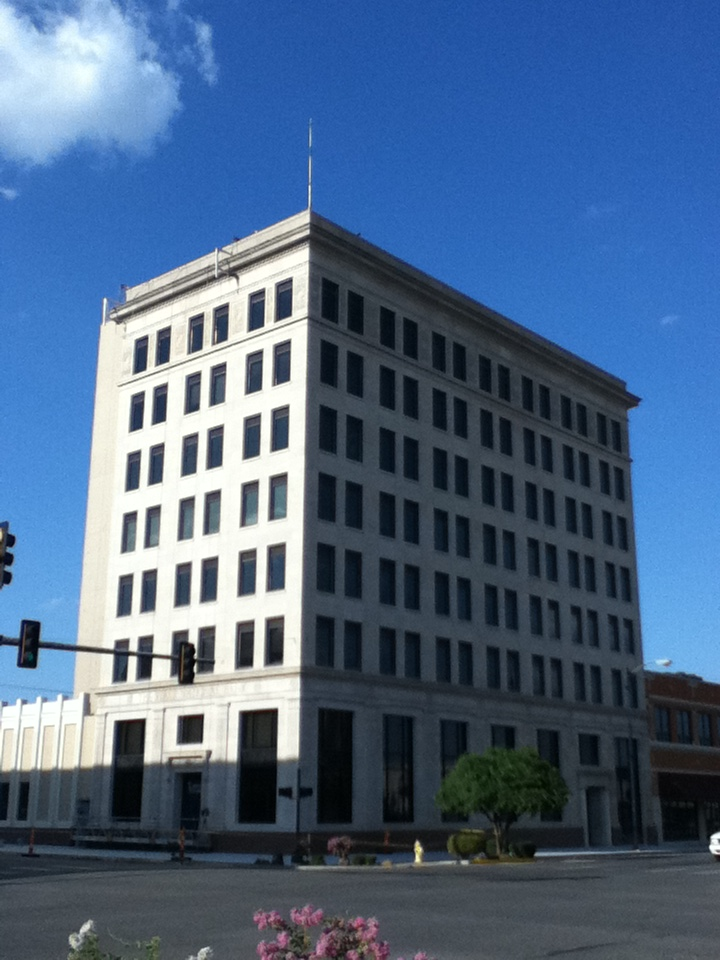
First National Bank at 201 North Grand

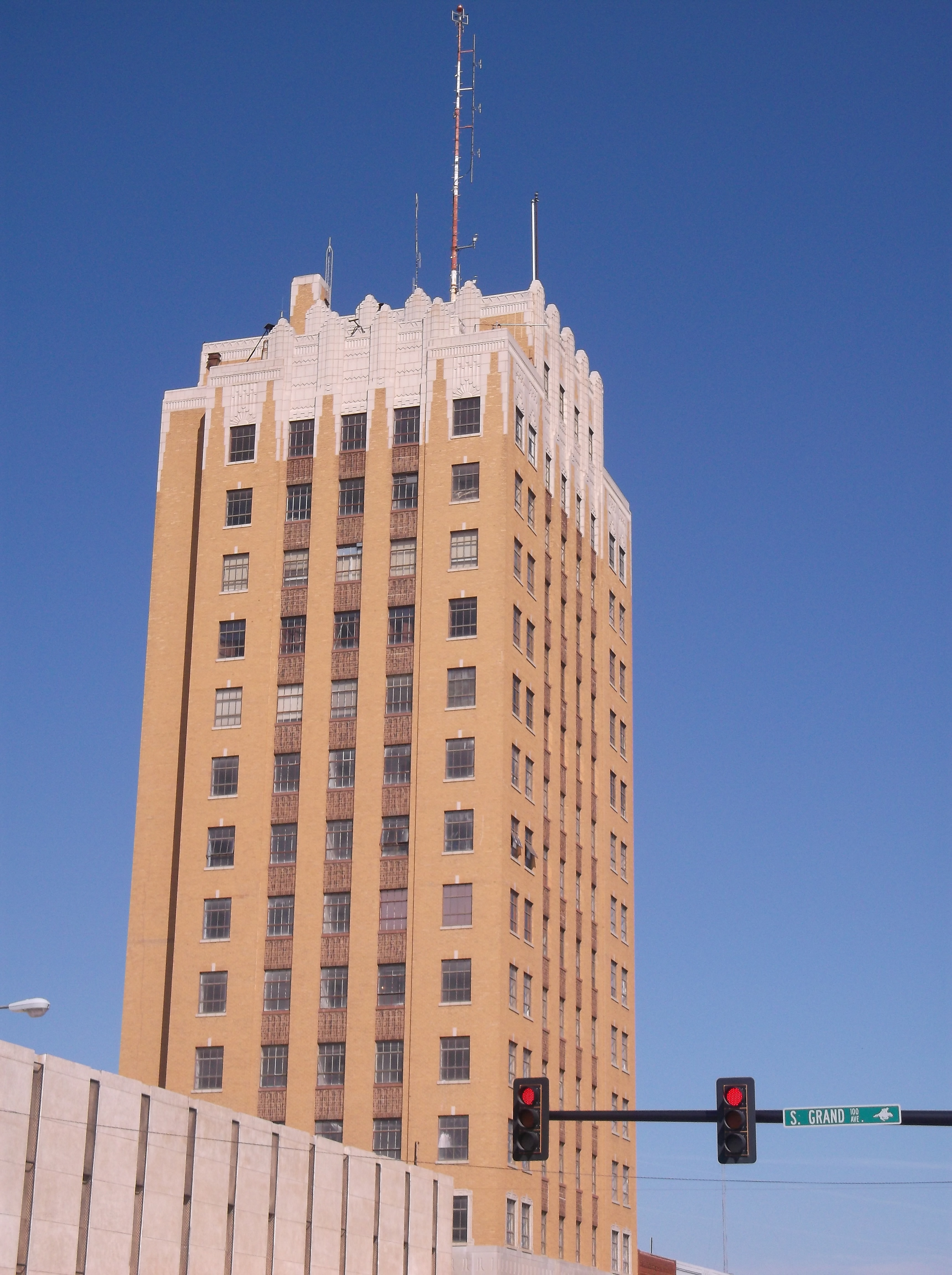
Broadway Tower at 114-118 East Broadway

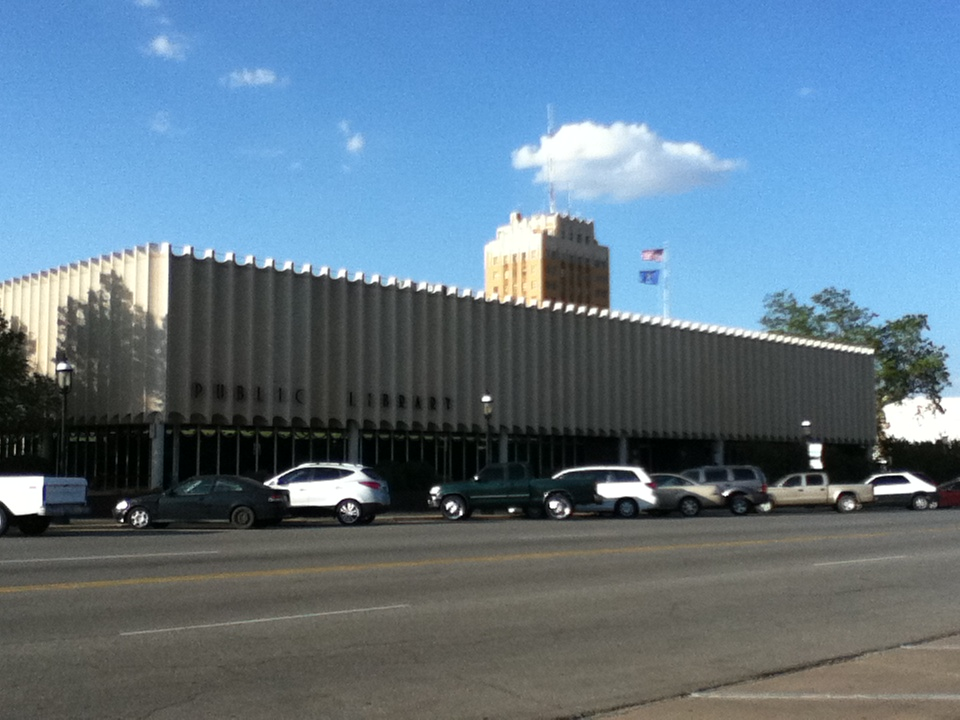
Public Library of Enid and Garfield County at 120 West Maine

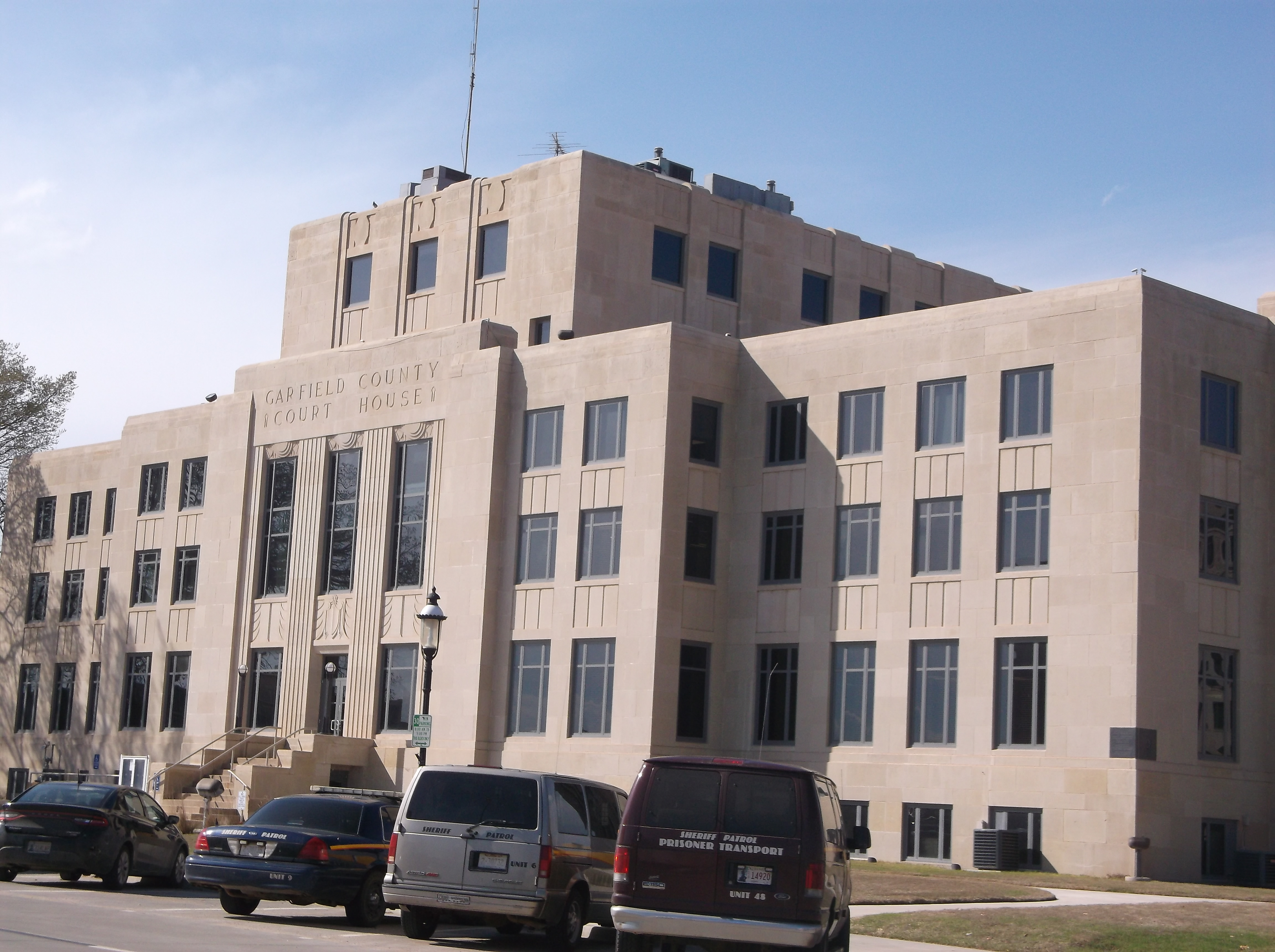
Garfield County Courthouse at 100 West Broadway

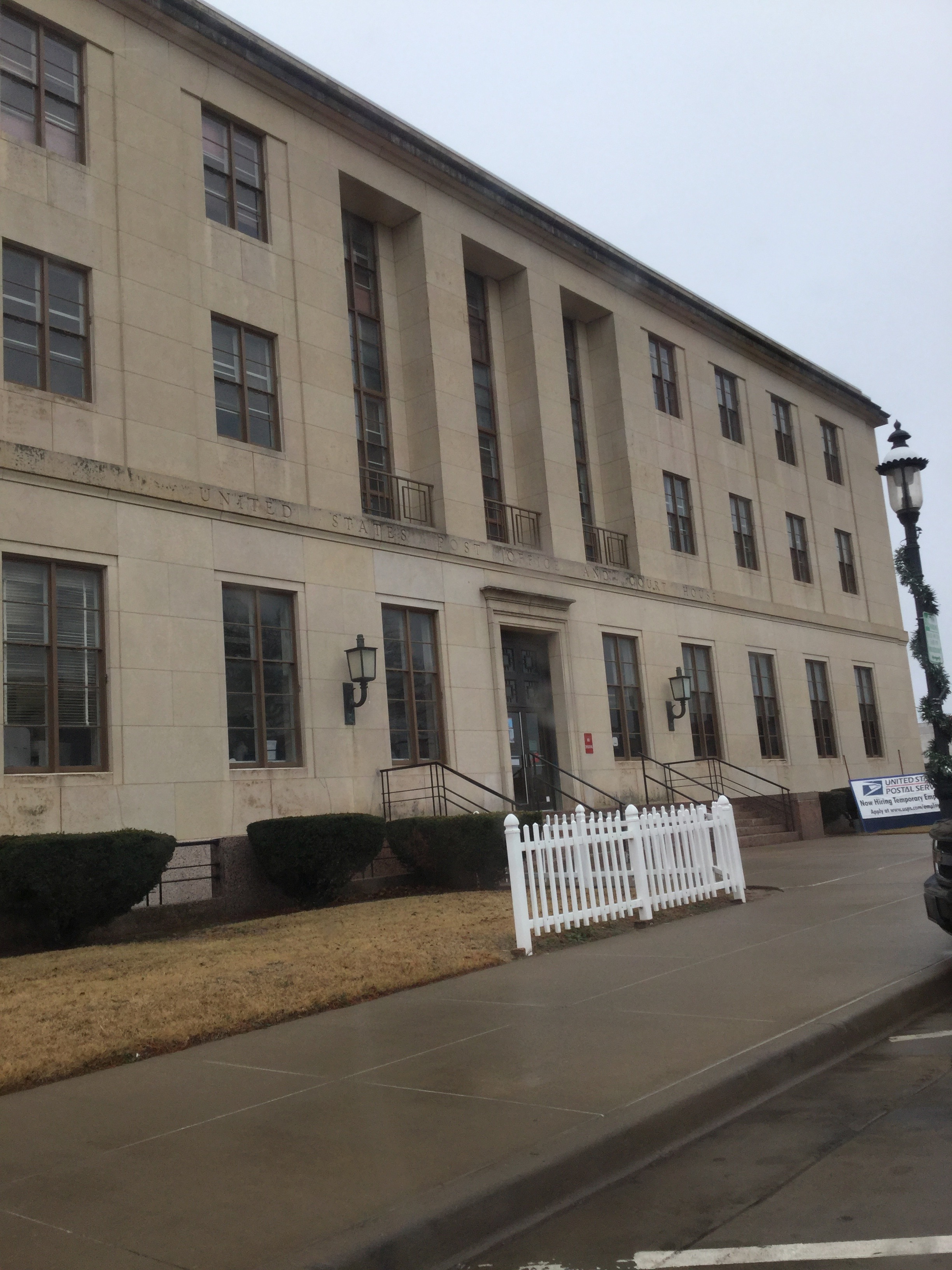
U.S. Post Office and Courthouse at 115 West Broadway

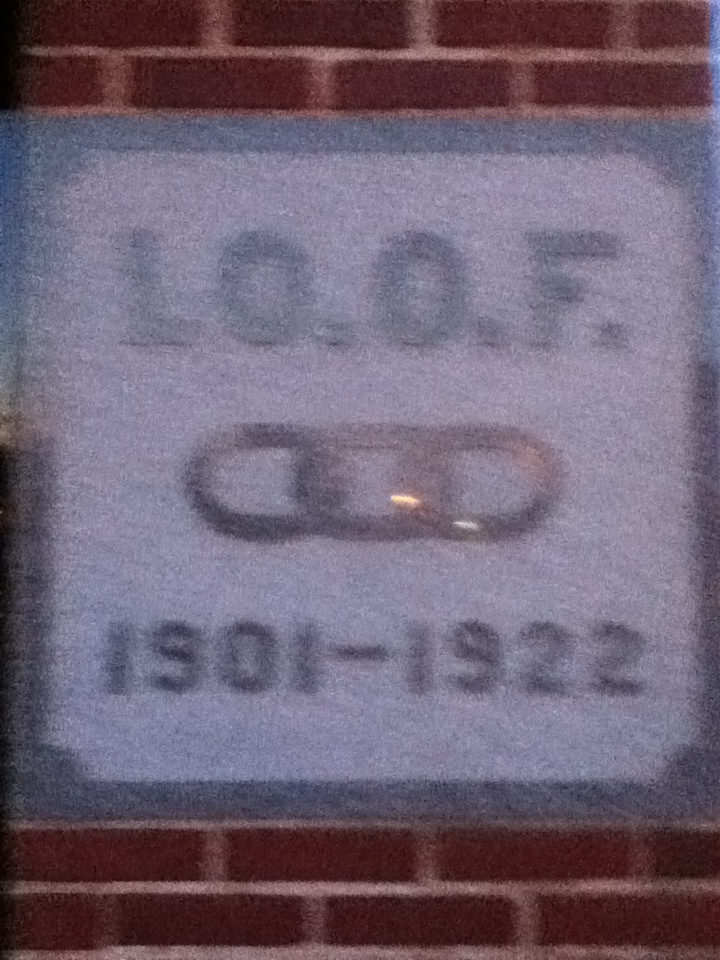
Cornerstone of IOOF building at 223-225 South Grand Avenue

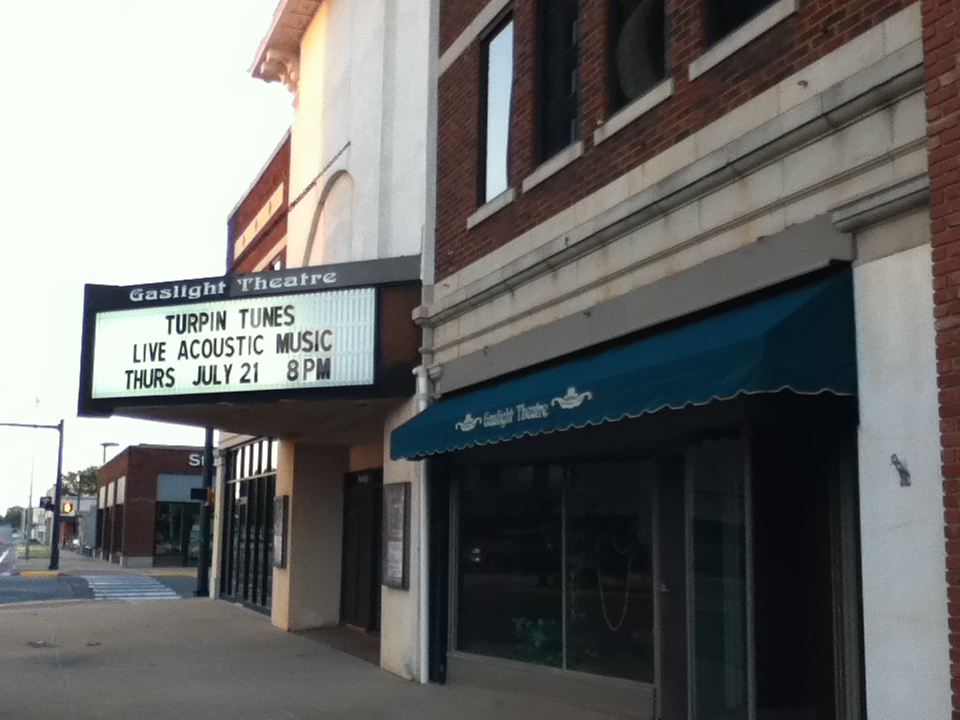
Billings theatre building at 122 N. Independence
