= Land Run of 1895 =

Opening of land to settlers in the US

Oklahoma Land Rush of 1895
- Date: May 23, 1895
- Location: Central Oklahoma
- Also known as: Oklahoma Land Rush

The Land Run of 1895 was the smallest and last land run in the U.S. state of Oklahoma. It came about with an agreement between the Kickapoo and the federal government that allocated to individual Kickapoos 22,640 acres (91.6 km^{2}) of land. The federal government purchased the remaining 183,440 acres (742.4 km^{2}) of the Kickapoo Reservation and opened the land up to settlers.

The land run took place on May 23, 1895. It was delayed since 1890, because of debate among tribal members over whether to accept allotment offers. Federal officials used "unscrupulous methods" to gain the signatures of tribal leaders and the Kickapoo Allotment Act was passed by the U.S. Congress on March 30, 1893. The proclamation opening the land was signed by President Grover Cleveland.

== Background ==
The Kickapoo reservation had consisted of 206,662 acres (836.33 km^{2}) and lay between the Deep Fork and North Canadian Rivers, bounded on the east by the former Sac and Fox reservation and on the west by the Indian meridian. Only 88,000 acres (360 km^{2}) were available for homesteading, as land was set aside for schools.

== Aftermath ==
The small scope of the fifth and final land run resulted in numerous lawsuits and land contests. Future land openings were handled by auction or lottery. Many individuals were unable to claim land and Oklahoma Territorial Governor William Cary Renfrow opened up an additional 90,000 acres (360 km^{2}) of school land for lease to give those individuals an opportunity.

The land run led to the formation of McLoud, Hagar, Wellston, Kickapoo, and North Wichita, Oklahoma; and increased the size of Lincoln, Pottawatomie, and Oklahoma counties.

== See also ==
- Land Run of 1889
- Land Run of 1891
- Land Run of 1892
- Land Run of 1893
