= Broadway Tower (Enid, Oklahoma) =

- U.S. National Register of Historic Places
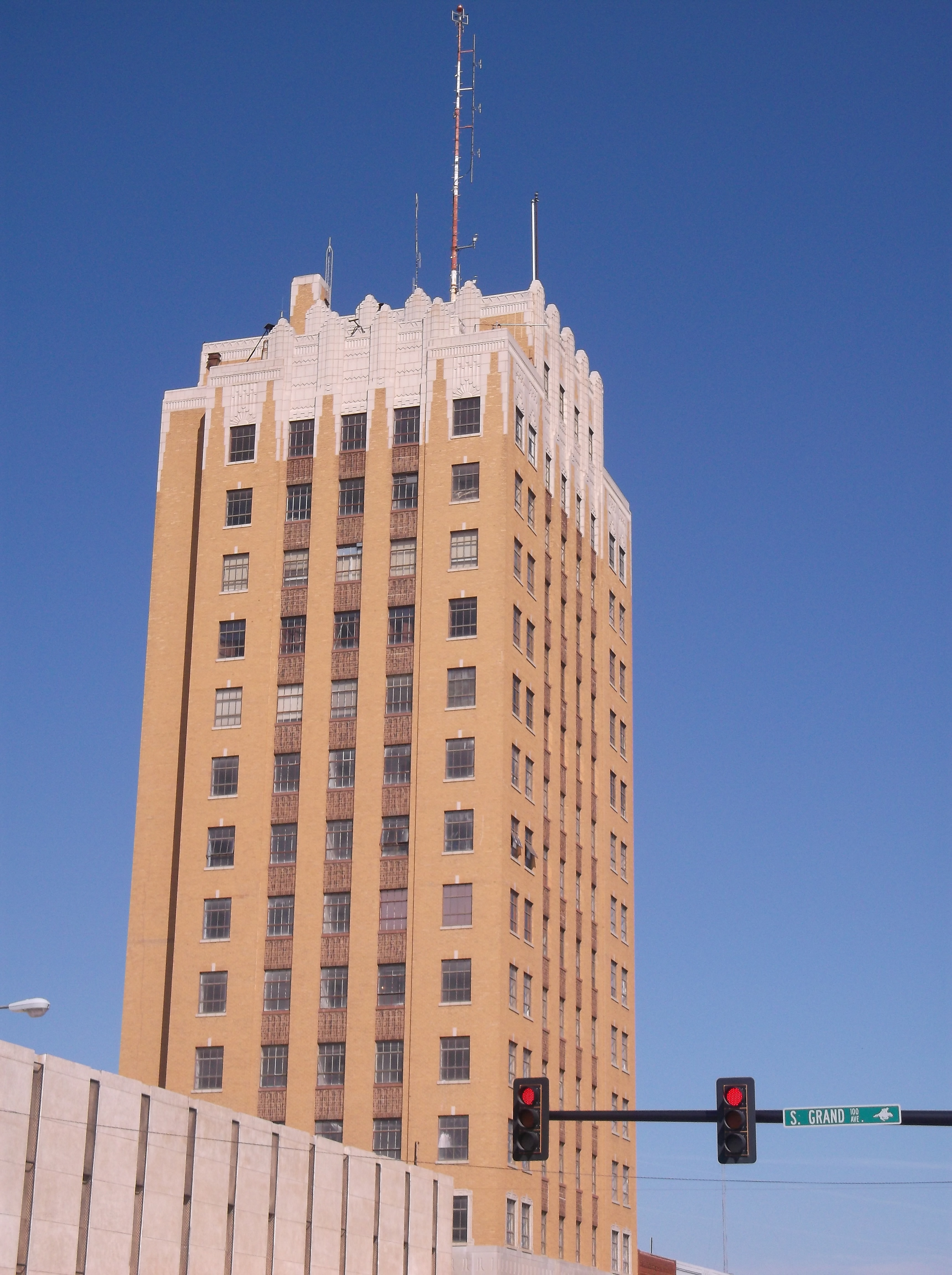

- Location within Oklahoma Location within the United States
- Location: 114 E. Broadway St., Enid, Oklahoma
- Coordinates: 36°23′48″N 97°52′38″W
- Built: 1931
- Architect: Enid & Layton, Hicks & Forsythe; McMillan & Shelton Const. Co.
- Architectural style: Art Deco
- NRHP reference No.: 85002789
- Added to NRHP: November 14, 1985

The Broadway Tower, located in the Enid Downtown Historic District in Enid, Oklahoma, was constructed in 1931 by McMillen and Shelton Construction Company. The Broadway Development Company hired George Ernst von Blumenauer of Enid, and the Oklahoma City firm Layton, Hicks, and Forsythe to design the building, in the Art Deco style.

In 1943, Mr. Garrison Munger, Sr. purchased the building. It remained in his family's ownership until 1981. It is currently managed by Cole Investment Properties, Inc. The building was sold to Kriztofer Cole and his Business Partner William LaVigna in 2025. The building is the tallest in Enid at 15 stories tall. It has been listed on the National Register of Historic Places since 1985.

After a fire destroyed the original Garfield County Courthouse, the Broadway Tower became a temporary courthouse location from 1932 to 1936.

In 2015 the building was closed to the public when portions of the brick exterior separated from the building. It was declared dilapidated by the City of Enid in 2022.

== Gallery ==
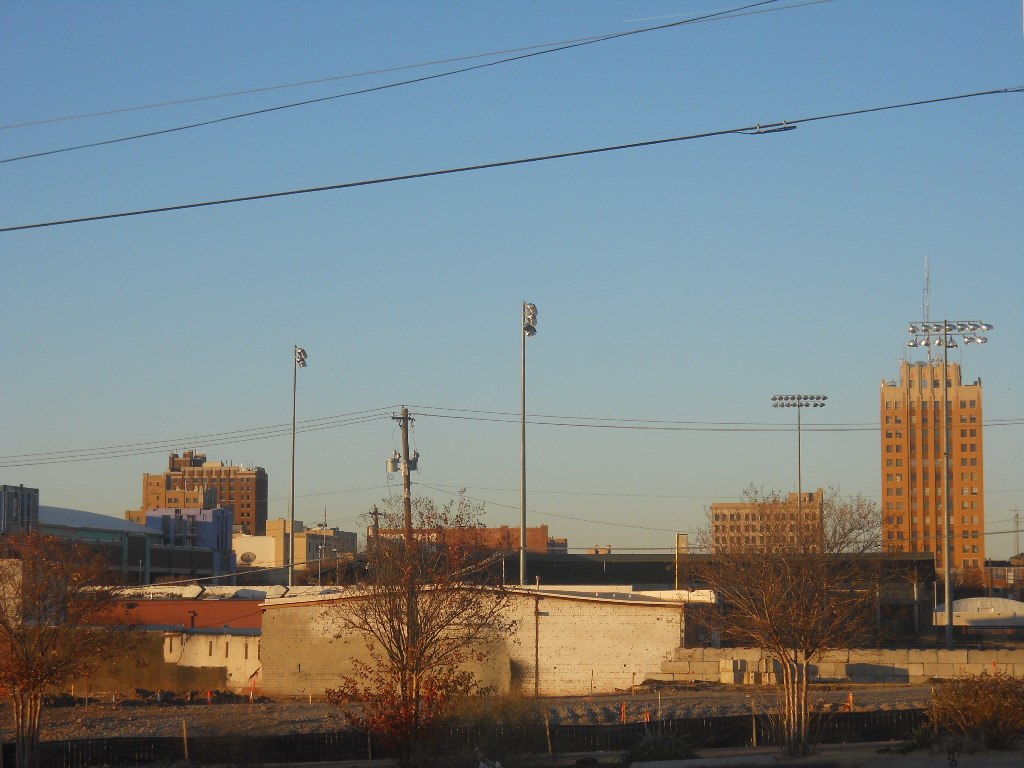
A skyline view of Enid, Oklahoma with Broadway Tower

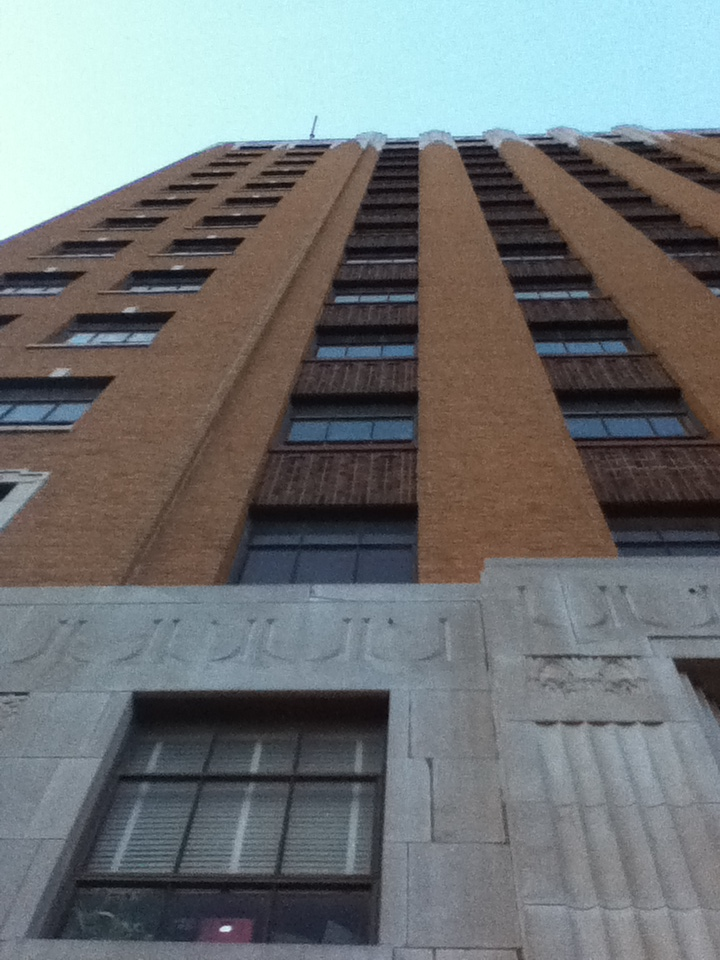
Looking up at Enid's Broadway Tower

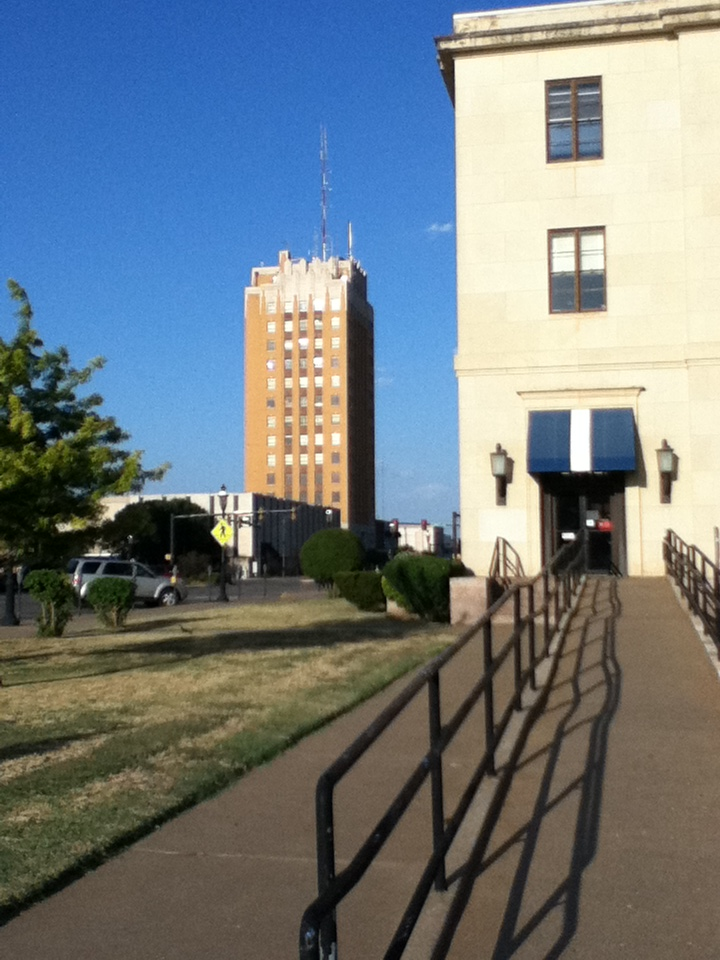
Enid Post office with Broadway Tower in the background

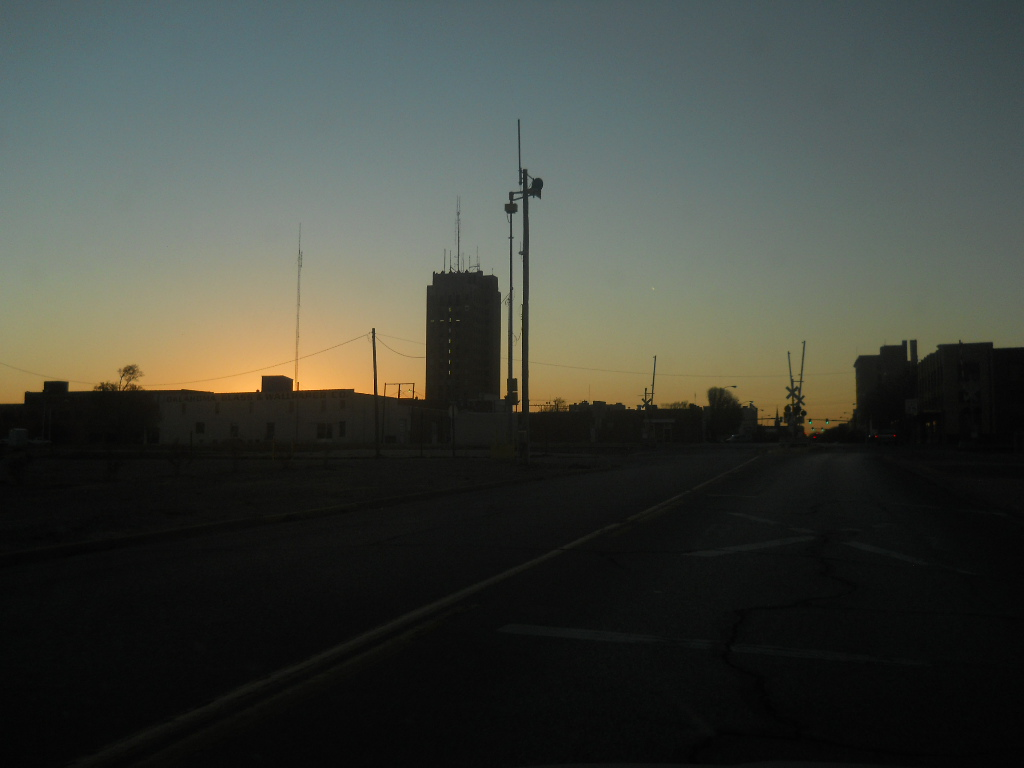
Enid skyline at sunset with Broadway Tower

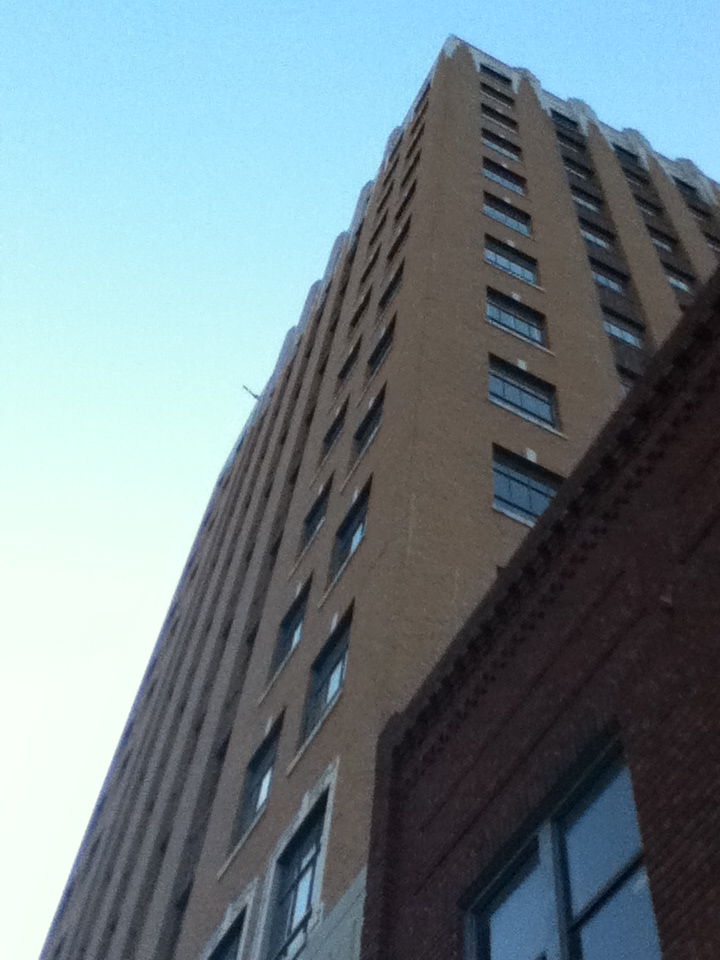
Broadway Tower

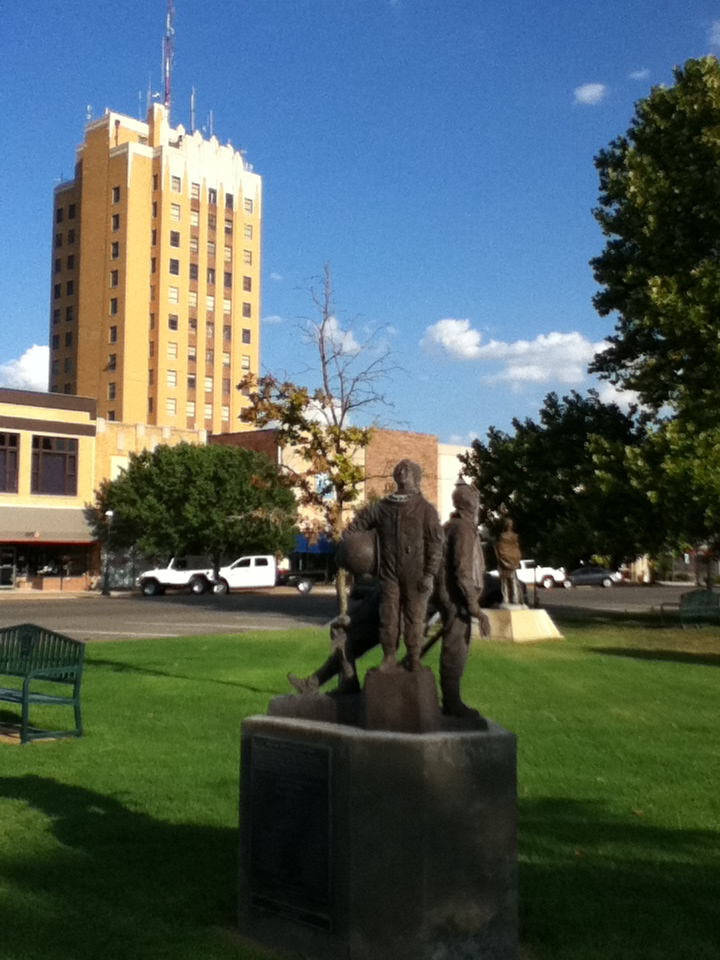
Pioneers Statue with Broadway Tower behind it.

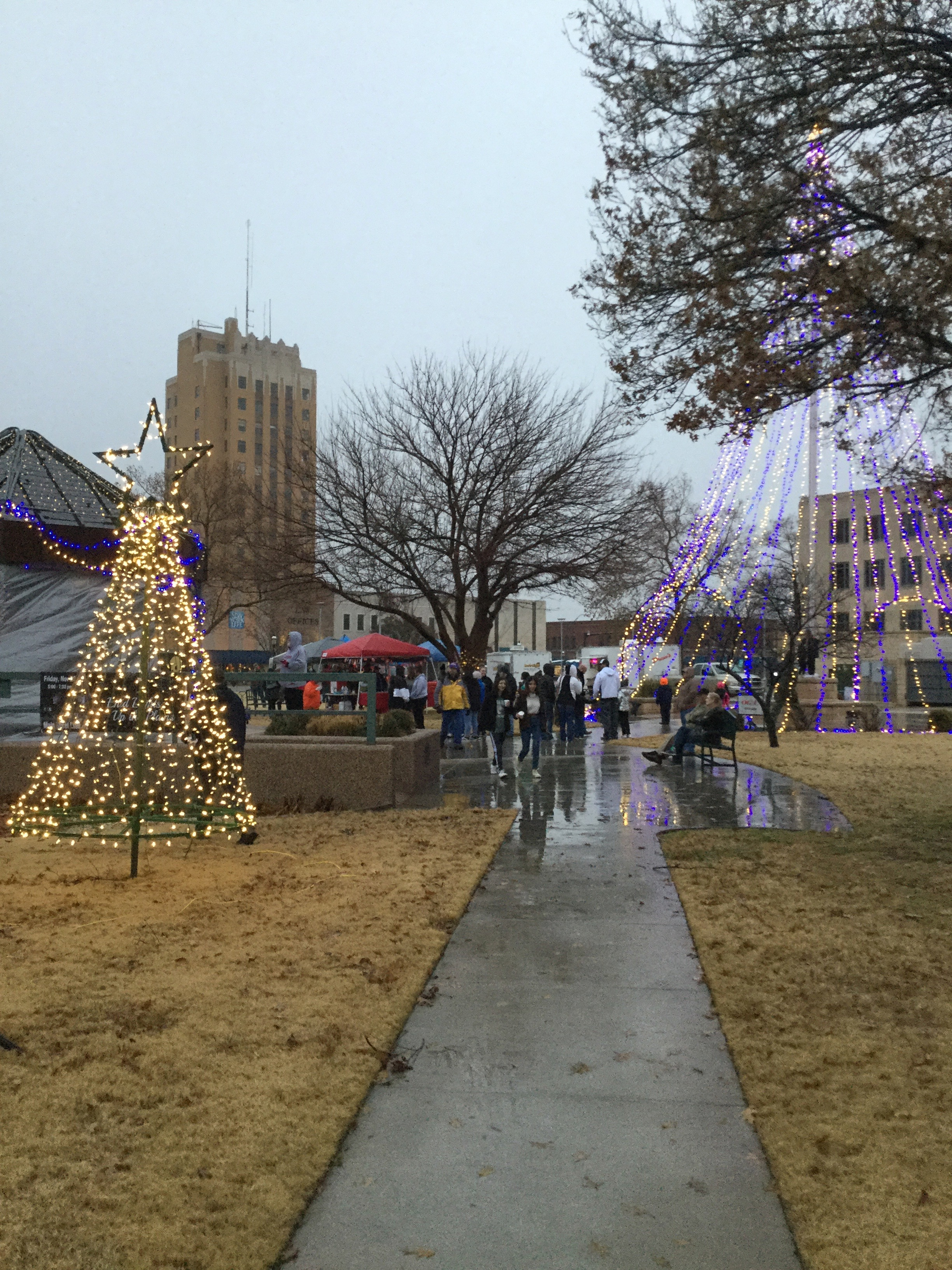
Broadway Tower seen during Christmas season.

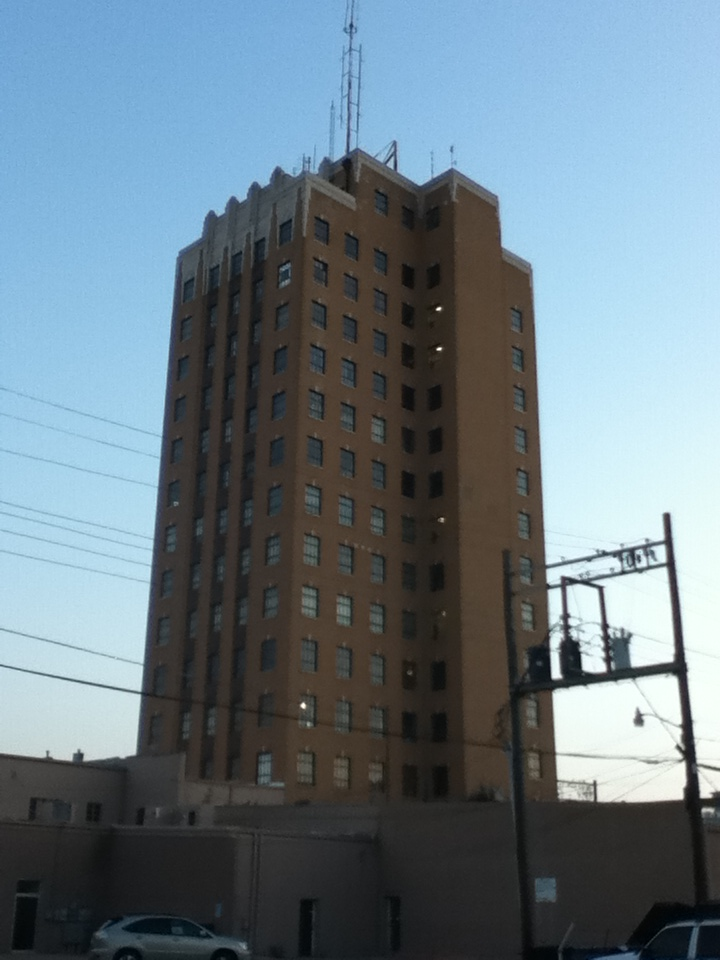
Broadway Tower
