= Cherokee Strip Regional Heritage Center =

History museum in Enid, Oklahoma, US

Coordinates: 36°23′30″N 97°52′23″W

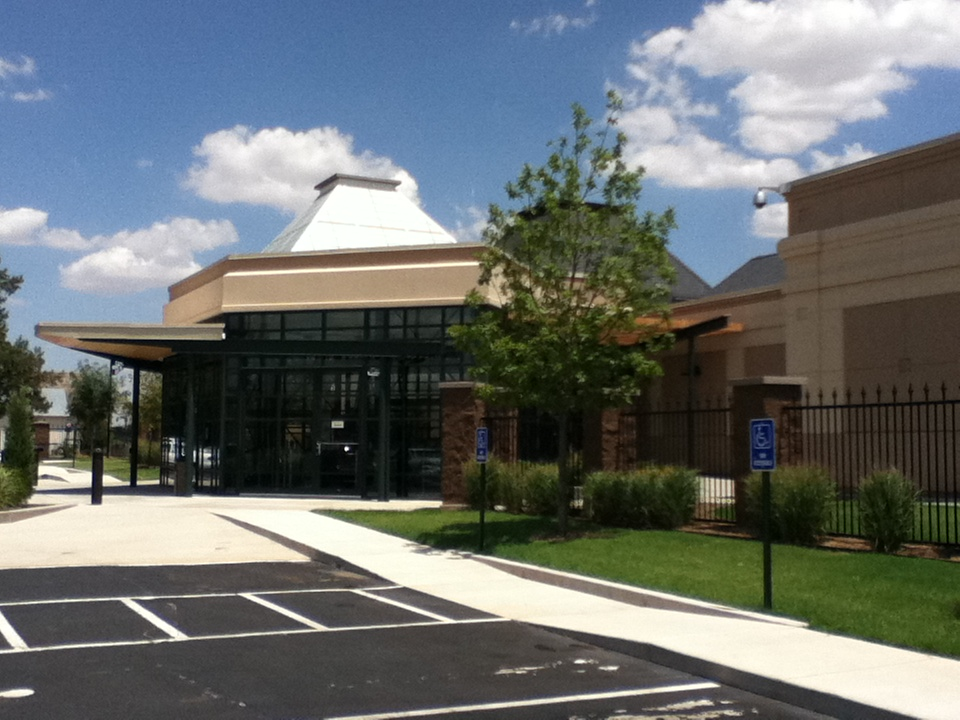
- Former name: Museum of the Cherokee Strip
- Established: April 1, 2011
- Location: 507 S. 4th St., Enid, Oklahoma
- Type: History Museum
- Website: www.csrhc.org

The Cherokee Strip Regional Heritage Center (CSRHC) is a museum in Enid, Oklahoma, that focuses on the history of the Cherokee Outlet and the Land Run of September 16, 1893. Previously named the Museum of the Cherokee Strip, the museum has undergone renovations expanding the museum space to 24,000 square feet. The Cherokee Strip Regional Heritage Center is home to permanent and temporary exhibit galleries, a research center, and the Humphrey Heritage Village.

== History ==
Talk of a museum in Enid featuring artifacts from the 1893 Land Run began in the 1940s. In 1951 Harry H. McKeever, chairman of the Cherokee Strip Historical Association, began collecting historical artifacts and interviews with residents who had participated in the Land Run. The museum was housed in the basement of the courthouse and opened on September 14, 1951 during the annual Cherokee Strip Land Run anniversary celebration. In August 1953 it moved to the basement of the Enid Carnegie Library, and in 1957 it moved to the basement of an old post office building. The post office building was razed to make room for the Public Library of Enid and Garfield County, and the museum was moved to Convention Hall. In 1962 Phillips University and the Sons and Daughters of the Cherokee Strip decided to combine their museums. The museum opened in November 1966 and was located at the University's former library building which was constructed in 1914.

The Museum of the Cherokee Strip was officially opened at its current location at 507 S. 4th St. on September 13, 1975. The Garfield County Historical Society, Sons and Daughters of the Cherokee Strip Pioneers, and Cherokee Strip Historical Society preserved and collected historical artifacts from Cherokee Outlet which are displayed at the museum.

In 2005, through a partnership between the Oklahoma Historical Society, the Sons and Daughters of the Cherokee Strip, and the Phillips Legacy Foundation, the Cherokee Strip Regional Heritage Center, Inc. was formed to build a new facility. The Cherokee Strip Regional Heritage Center was opened to the public on April 1, 2011.

The Heritage Center is operated by the Oklahoma Historical Society.

== Galleries and Exhibits ==
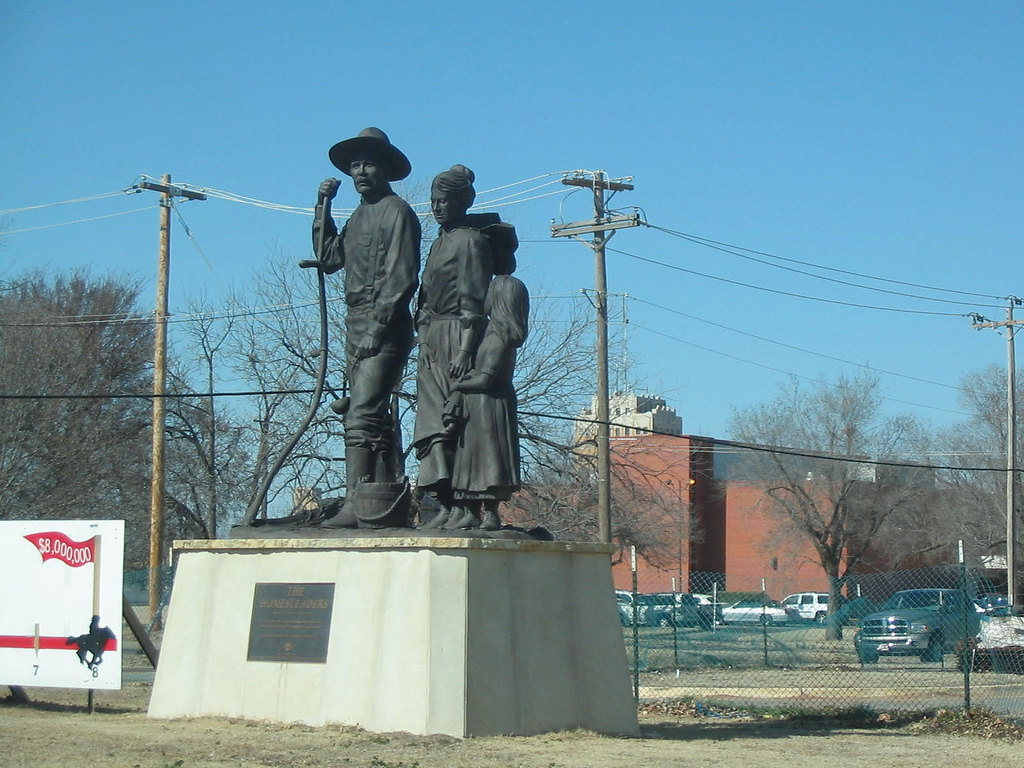
The Pioneer Family Statue by local sculptor, Harold Holden, stands outside the Cherokee Strip Regional Heritage Center.

Permanent exhibits tell the story of early settlement of the region after the Land Run of 1893, the development of agriculture, the discovery of oil, and the early rail industry in the region. Additional exhibits focus on Phillips University and Enid, Oklahoma history.

The Heritage Center has a temporary exhibit gallery that houses traveling exhibitions. At a gala on September 16, 2010, the museums featuring David Fitzgerald's "Cherokee Nation: Portrait of a People" photography exhibit. It was the museum's first exhibit in its temporary exhibit hall, which predated the opening of the rest of the permanent exhibits.

== Research Center ==
The Heritage Center houses a research center with an archival collection that includes photographs, oral histories, newspapers, genealogical information, and a reference library. A full-time archivist is on staff to help visitors with research requests.

== Humphrey Heritage Village ==
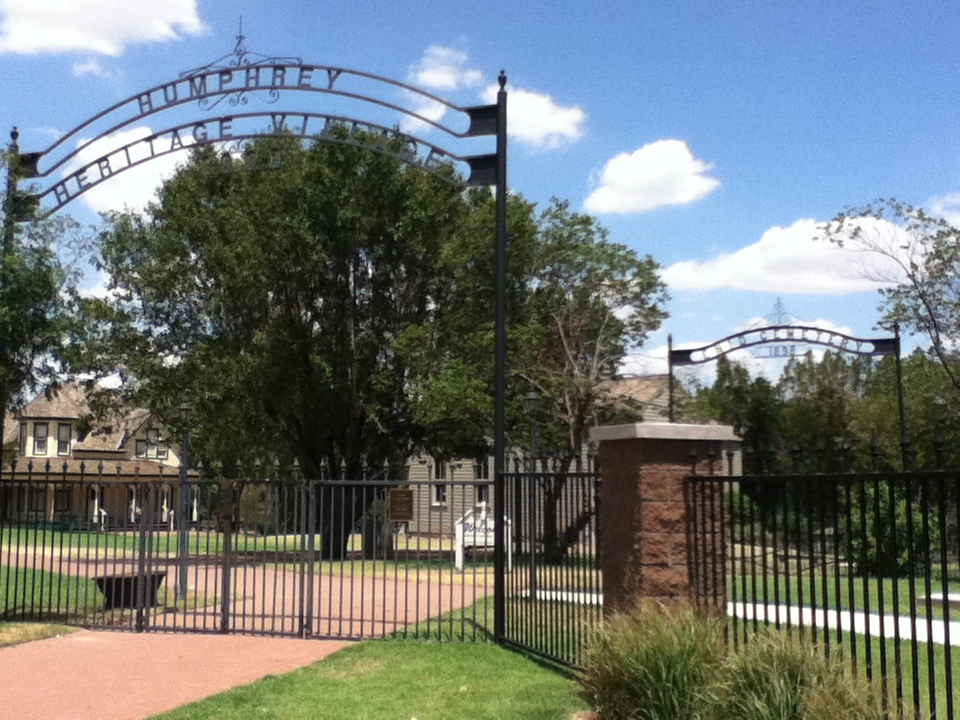
The entrance to the Humphrey Heritage Village.

The Humphrey Heritage Village is a living history village on the grounds of the Cherokee Strip Regional Heritage Center. The village includes historic buildings from northwestern Oklahoma, such as Enid's U.S. Land Office from the Land Run of 1893. Other buildings include the Glidewell house, Enid's first Episcopal church, and the Turkey Creek School House.

== See also ==
- Regional heritage
- Oklahoma Historical Society
- Cherokee Outlet
