= Land run =

Opening of land to settlers in U.S. history

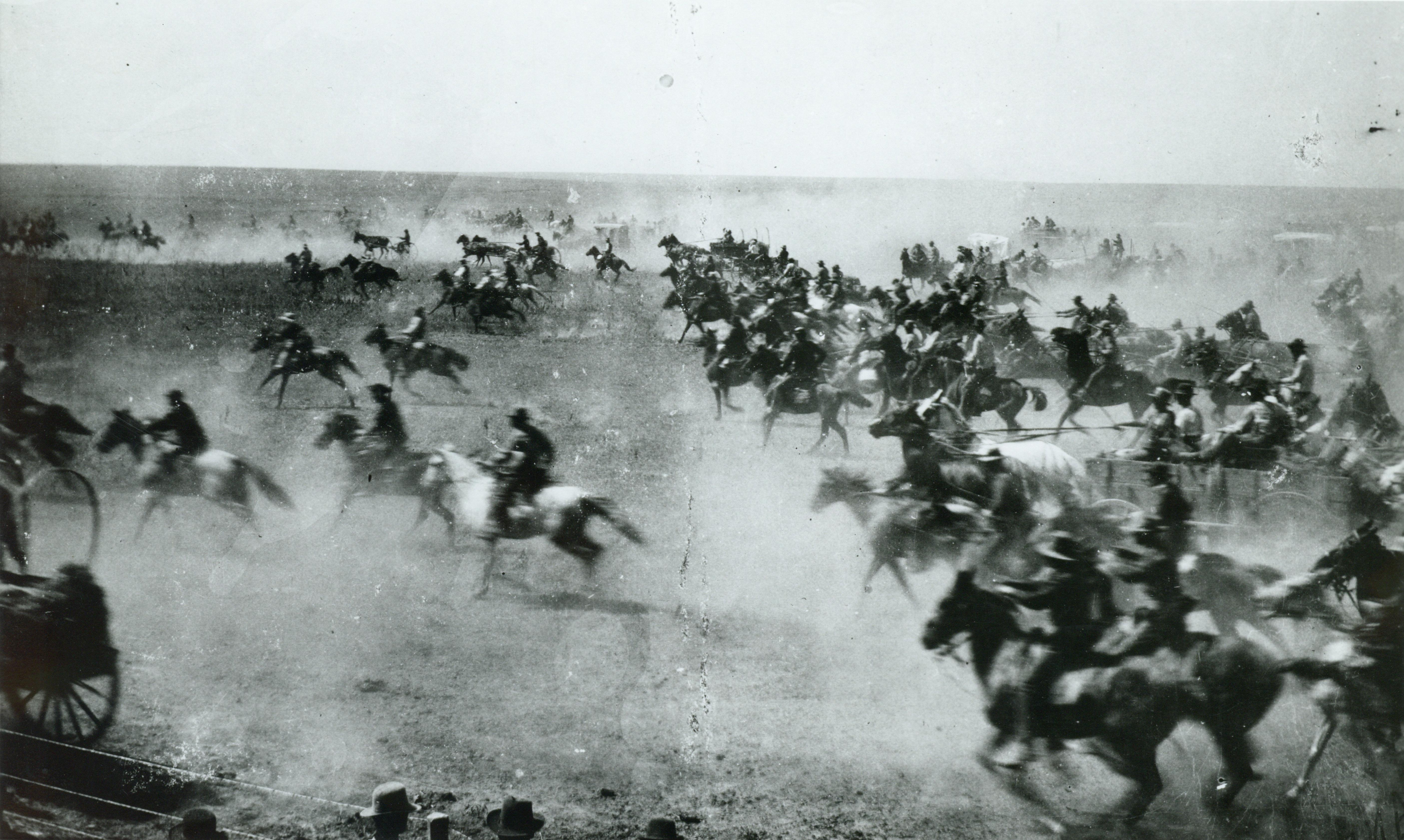
The only photo of a land run in progress, taken in 1889

A land run or land rush was an event in which previously restricted land of the United States was opened to homestead on a first-arrival basis. Lands were opened and sold first-come or by bid, or won by lottery, or by means other than a run. The settlers, no matter how they acquired occupancy, purchased the land from the United States General Land Office. For Reservation Indian lands, the Land Office distributed the sales funds to the various tribal entities, according to previously negotiated terms. The Oklahoma Land Rush of 1889 was the most prominent of the land runs while the Land Run of 1893 was the largest. The opening of the former Kickapoo area in 1895 was the last use of a land run in the present area of Oklahoma.

== In Oklahoma ==
After years of raids—led by the leaders of the Boomers activist movement such as David L. Payne—into the central area of what would become the U.S. state of Oklahoma, Congress finally agreed to open what was dubbed the Unassigned Lands. Seven land runs in all took place in Oklahoma, beginning with the initial and most famous Land Rush of April 22, 1889, which gave rise to the terms "Eighty-Niner" (a veteran of that run) and "Sooner." That area led to today's Canadian, Cleveland, Kingfisher, Logan, Oklahoma, and Payne counties of Oklahoma.

The nearly two million acres of land opened up to white settlement was located in Indian Territory, a large area that once encompassed much of modern-day Oklahoma. The Indian Removal Act of 1830 eventually led to the Trail of Tears. Creek and Seminole tribes were granted area known before the Land Run as the Unassigned Lands. Some American Indian tribes signed a treaty of alliance with the Confederacy in 1861. Initially considered unsuitable for white colonization, Indian Territory was thought to be an ideal place to relocate Native Americans who were removed from their traditional lands to make way for white settlement. The relocations began in 1817, and by the 1880s, Indian Territory was a new home to a variety of tribes, including the Chickasaw, Choctaw, Cherokee, Creek, Cheyenne, Comanche, and Apache.

The Land Run of September 22, 1891, opened the Iowa, Sac and Fox, Potawatomi, and Shawnee lands to settlement. The land run opened 6,097 plots of 160 acres (65 ha) each of former reservation land. On the following day, a land run was held to settle Tecumseh, the pre-designated location of the county seat of County B, later renamed as Pottawatomie County. On September 28, 1891, another land run was held to settle Chandler, the pre-designated location of the county seat of County A, later renamed as Lincoln County.

The Land Run of April 19, 1892, opened the Cheyenne and Arapaho lands.

The Land Run of September 16, 1893, was known as the Cherokee Strip Land Run. It opened 8,144,682.91 acres (12,726 square miles or about 3.3 million hectares) to settlement. The land was purchased from the Cherokees. It was the largest land run in U.S. history, four times larger than the Land Rush of 1889. The Cherokee Strip Regional Heritage Center museum at the eastern edge of Enid, Oklahoma commemorates this event.

The final land run in Oklahoma was the Land Run of 1895 to settle the Kickapoo lands. Each run had exhibited many problems and the Federal Government deemed the run to be an inefficient way to distribute land to would-be settlers. After 1895, the government distributed land by sealed-bid auctions. Major openings by this method included Kiowa-Comanche-Apache Reservation (1901), the Wichita-Caddo Reservation (1901), and the Big Pasture (1906).

There was one land run in the 20th century, but on a much smaller scale, held to select lots in the community of Arcadia, on August 6, 1901. This was similar to the run to settle Chandler in 1891.

== Legacy ==
In honor of Oklahoma's Centennial of statehood, sculptor Paul Moore won the commission for the Oklahoma Centennial Land Run Monument. As Moore completed elements of the 45-piece monument, such as horses and riders, wagons and horse teams, dogs, and others, they were installed in lower Bricktown, Oklahoma City. To be completed at a future date the monument covers approximately 365 feet (111 m), making it overall one of the largest bronze sculptures in the world.

== In popular culture ==
- The 1889 and 1893 Oklahoma Land Runs were portrayed in Edna Ferber's 1929 novel, Cimarron, as well as the 1931 and 1960 films of the same name based on the novel.
- The Land Run of 1893, also known as the Cherokee Strip Land Run, was portrayed in the films Tumbleweeds (1925) and Far and Away (1992) and was also depicted in 1969 novel The Thundering Prairie by M. A. Hancock.
