= Regional heritage =

Natural and cultural environments and associated intangible cultural heritage

Regional heritage consists of the natural and cultural environments and associated intangible cultural heritage that are perceived to be of importance in a region. The term “regional heritage” is parallel to the word world heritage but does not refer to a specific object, but rather sets of sites, buildings and landscapes perceived to be valuable. Regional heritage is not formally appointed. Instead, it is subject to constant evaluation and discussion, and appears more or less clearly in the consensus among local, regional and national stakeholders.

Regional heritage is physical environments, as perceived by humans. And in addition, its history, stories, customs and the "genius loci" that are constantly recreated and are transferred from generation to generation, creating a sense of identity and continuity.

Keith Dewar writes: "Heritage can be world heritage, regional heritage, or it can belong to a particular culture or simply to an extended family. Heritage should not be seen simply as cultural elements, since the natural environment also contains places of significance. Heritage value can be found in a national park or a farm woodlot. Natural sites are not necessarily in the past; they exist and are alive in the present."

== See also ==
- World heritage
- Cultural heritage
- Natural heritage
- Intangible cultural heritage
- Cherokee Strip Regional Heritage Center
