= Enid Masonic Temple =

- U.S. National Register of Historic Places
- U.S. Historic district – Contributing property
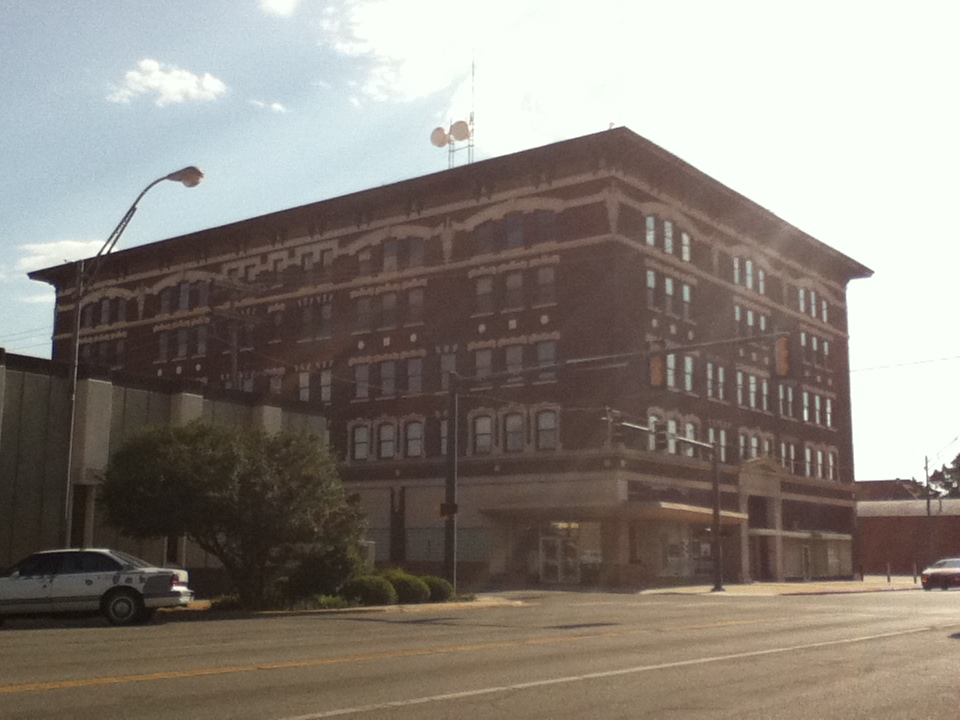
- Location: 301 W. Broadway, Enid, Oklahoma
- Coordinates: 36.39638°N 97.88184°W
- Built: 1924
- Architect: Garfield County Masons
- Architectural style: Italian Renaissance Revival
- Part of: Enid Downtown Historic District (ID07001265)
- NRHP reference No.: 84003954

Significant dates
- Added to NRHP: 1984
- Designated CP: December 12, 2007

The Enid Masonic Temple (also known as Enid Symphony Center and the Cole Building), is a historic building in Enid, Oklahoma. It is the home of the Enid Symphony Orchestra, Cole Investment Properties, Inc. and was listed on the National Register of Historic Places in 1984. The Italian Renaissance Revival building is also located within the Enid Downtown Historic District which became listed on the register in 2007. Cole Investment Properties, Inc. CEO Kriztofer Cole and CFO William LaVigna have reported plans to renovate the empty floors and make minor repairs to the exterior of the building.

== History ==
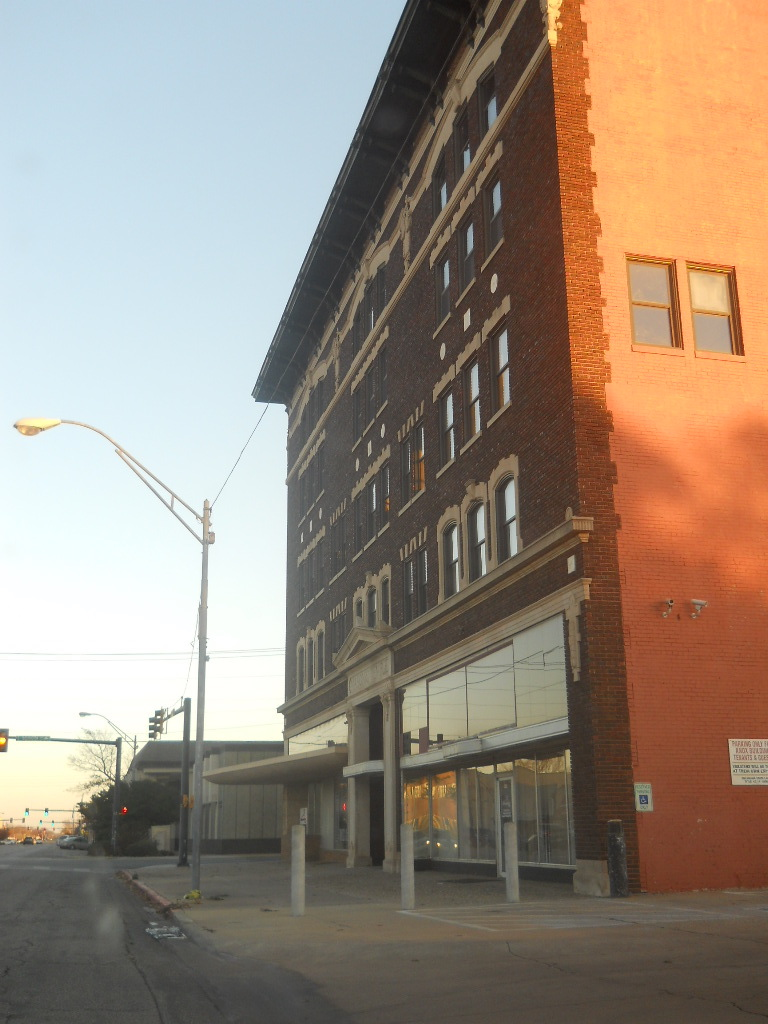
The Cole Building in downtown Enid, Oklahoma

The building was originally built in the 1920s as a meeting hall for several Garfield County Masonic lodges. During the Great Depression, oilman Charles Knox bought the building (and renamed it the Knox Building). Knox instituted a rent increase that was too steep for the Freemasons, who vacated to other premises. The building was then closed, causing a forty-year period of vacancy. The building was renamed to The Cole Building in February 2025. Local legend claims that the building is haunted by an elevator repairman named George, who had fallen to his death in the elevator shaft.

=== Enid Symphony Center ===
In the 1990s, the building was renovated and the 4th and 5th floor was turned into the Enid Symphony Center. Formed in 1905, the Enid Symphony Orchestra is the oldest in the state of Oklahoma. Under the leadership of Symphony director Doug Newell and the Enid Symphony Association, the fourth and fifth floors of the building were renovated in the 1990s at a cost of 3.2 million dollars. The renovations included the Enid Symphony Hall, a theatre hall with 1930s theatre seating, a lobby area with ancient Egyptian decor, Jane Champlin Art Gallery, and the Eleanor Hoehn Hornbaker Banquet Hall.
