= Garfield County Courthouse (Oklahoma) =

- U.S. National Register of Historic Places
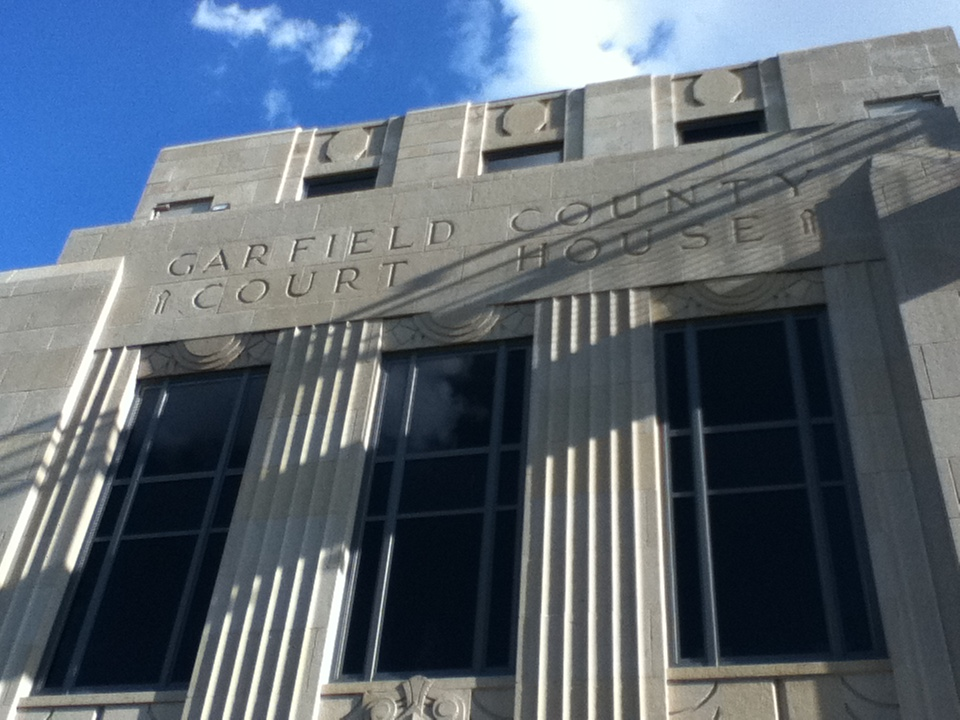

- Location within Oklahoma Location within the United States
- Location: W. Broadway, Enid, Oklahoma
- Coordinates: 36°23′49″N 97°52′44″W
- Area: 1 acre (0.40 ha)
- Built: 1930
- Architect: Reinhart & Donovan Co.; Hawk & Parr
- MPS: County Courthouses of Oklahoma TR
- NRHP reference No.: 84003018
- Added to NRHP: August 23, 1984

The Garfield County Courthouse is a historic courthouse building located in Enid, Oklahoma. It is on the National Register of Historic Places both individually and as a part of the Enid Downtown Historic District.

== Previous courthouses (1896 - 1936) ==
Enid's first courthouse opened on April 1, 1896. It consisted of a two-story brick building, which the County soon outgrew. Enid's second courthouse was built by O.A. Campbell of Oklahoma City in 1907 from Oklahoma granite and Indiana stone. The building was located in the center of Broadway, surrounded by sidewalks, and fully landscaped. Its south side was located where the front of the Enid Post Office is now. (Enid's post office used to be where the public library is located now, and Enid's public library was a Carnegie building located at 402 North Independence.) On January 29, 1931, a fire broke out in the jail and spread to the roof, then quickly spread to the rest of the building. All prisoners were safely evacuated, and county records were rescued. From 1931 to 1936, the County operated out of an agricultural building, and later the Broadway Tower.

== Current courthouse ==
The current Art Deco style Courthouse was built by Hawk & Parr and Reinhart & Donovan companies beginning on August 15, 1934, and was completed in 1936. The jail was refurbished in the 1960s. Garfield County Courthouse consists of county offices and courtrooms housed in the basement and first three floors, and Garfield County Jail occupies the top two floors. Funded by the Works Progress Administration Federal Art Project, artist Ruth Augur painted historical murals on the courthouse walls. In 1996, Enid artists Paladine Roye and his brother, Burgess Roye, also painted murals relating to Native American history.

== Gallery ==
Enid's courthouse in 1908.

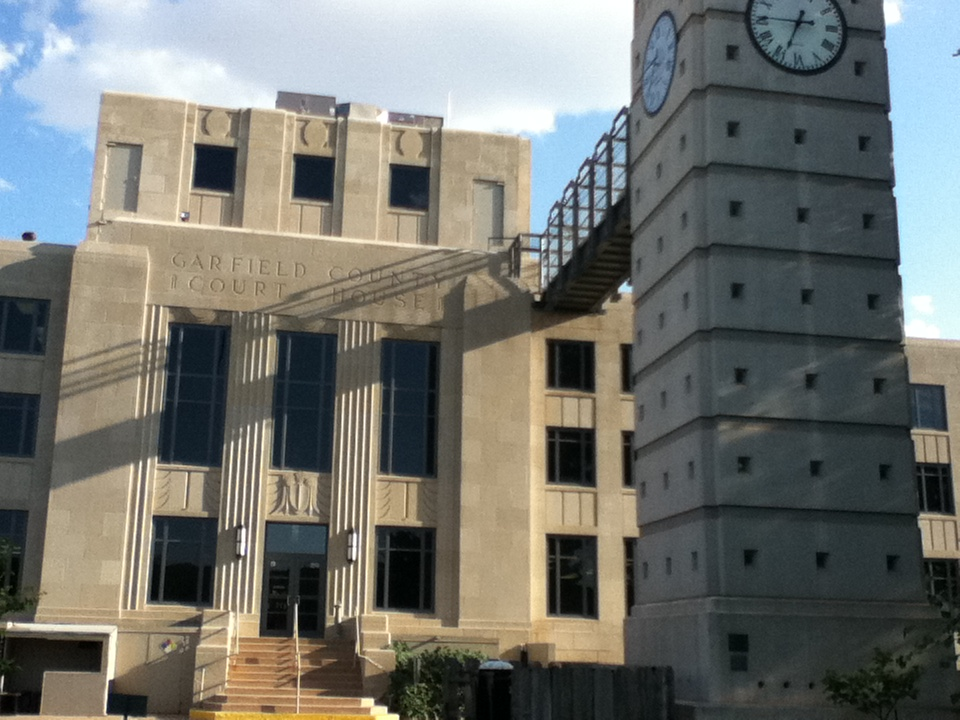
Garfield County Courthouse and Clock Tower

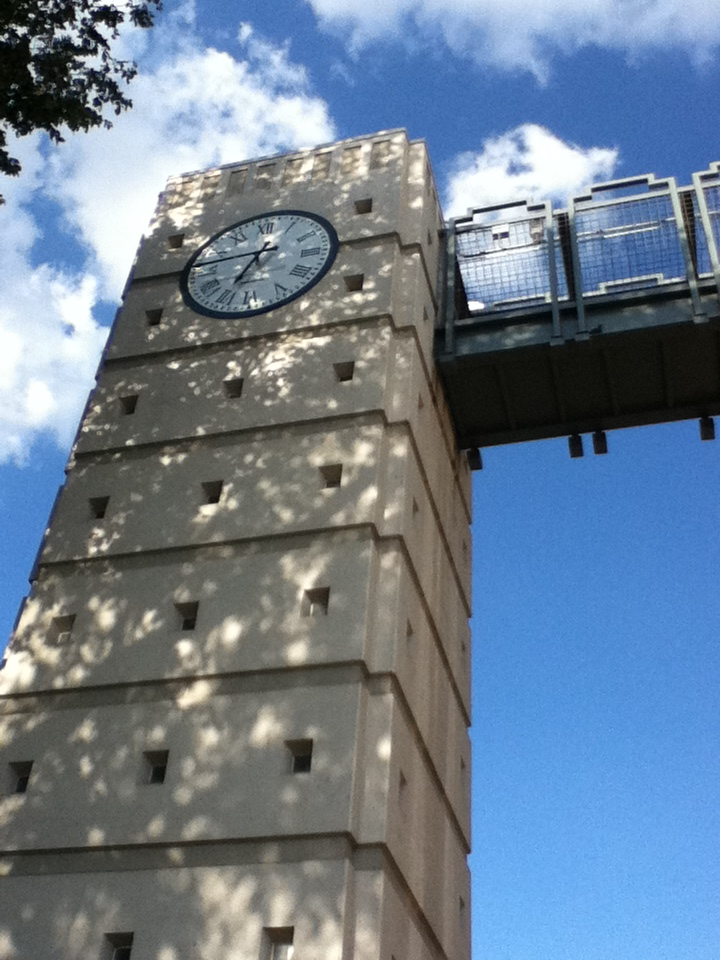
The clock tower of the Garfield County Courthouse.

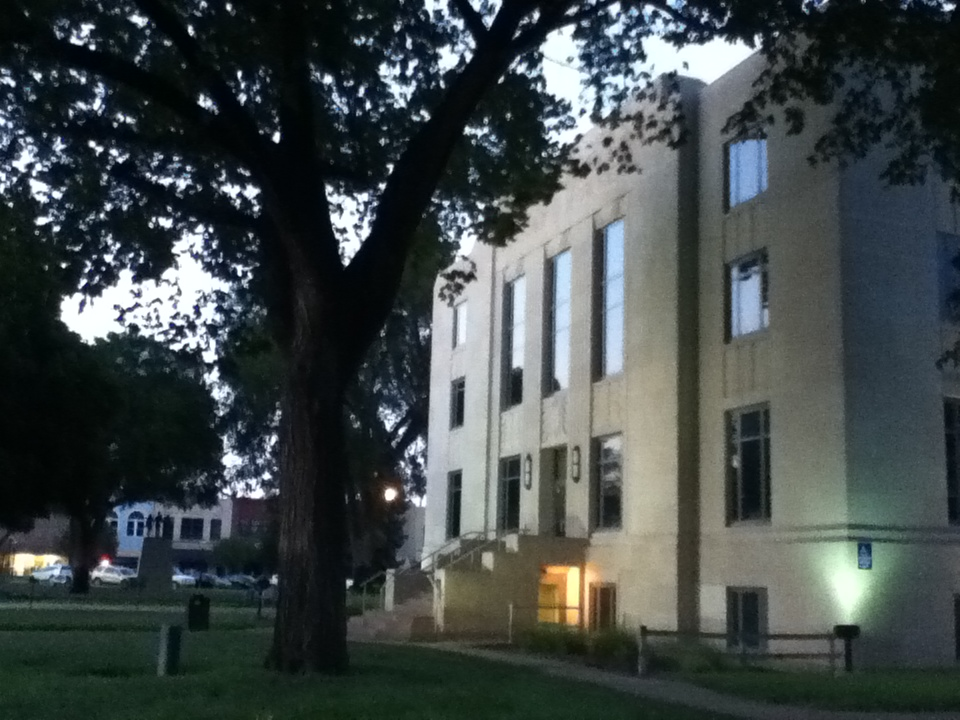
The Garfield County Courthouse in Enid

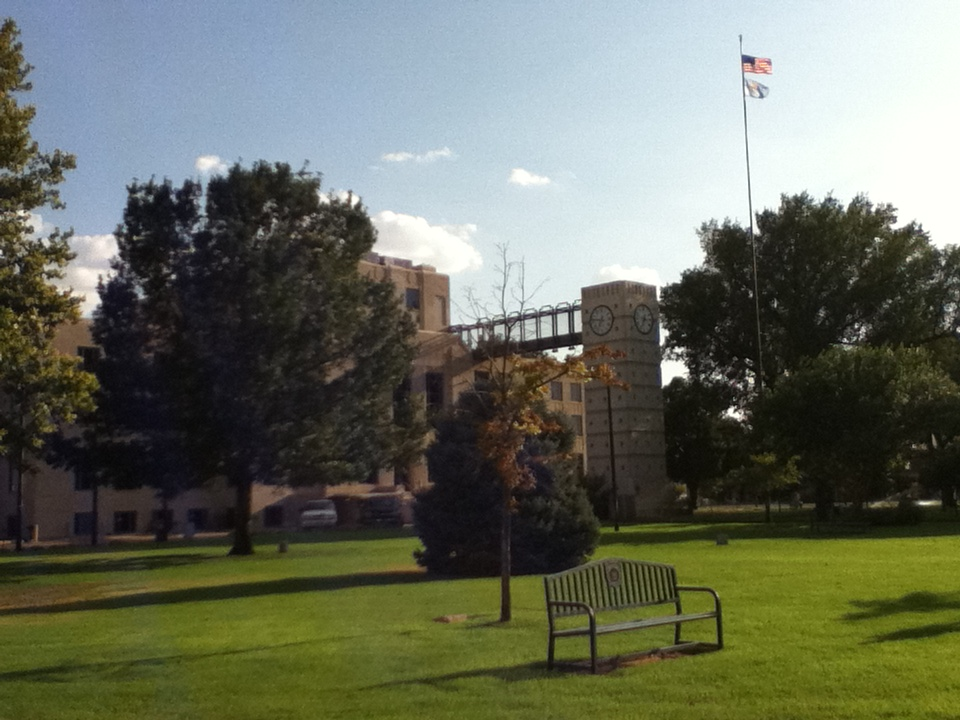
The Garfield County Courthouse Lawn

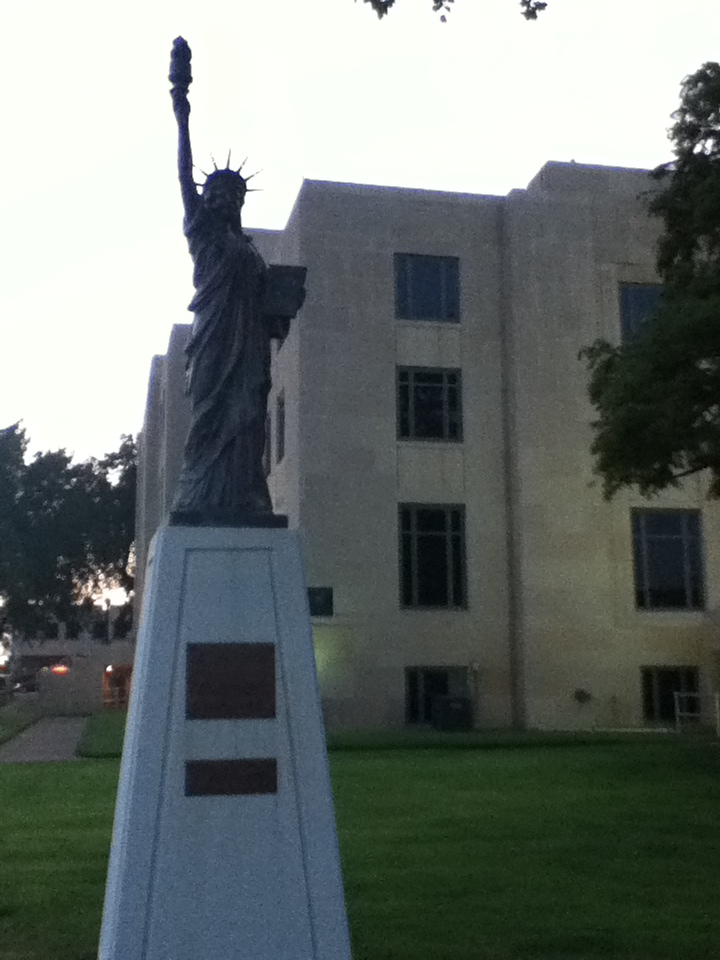
Statue of Liberty on Courthouse Lawn

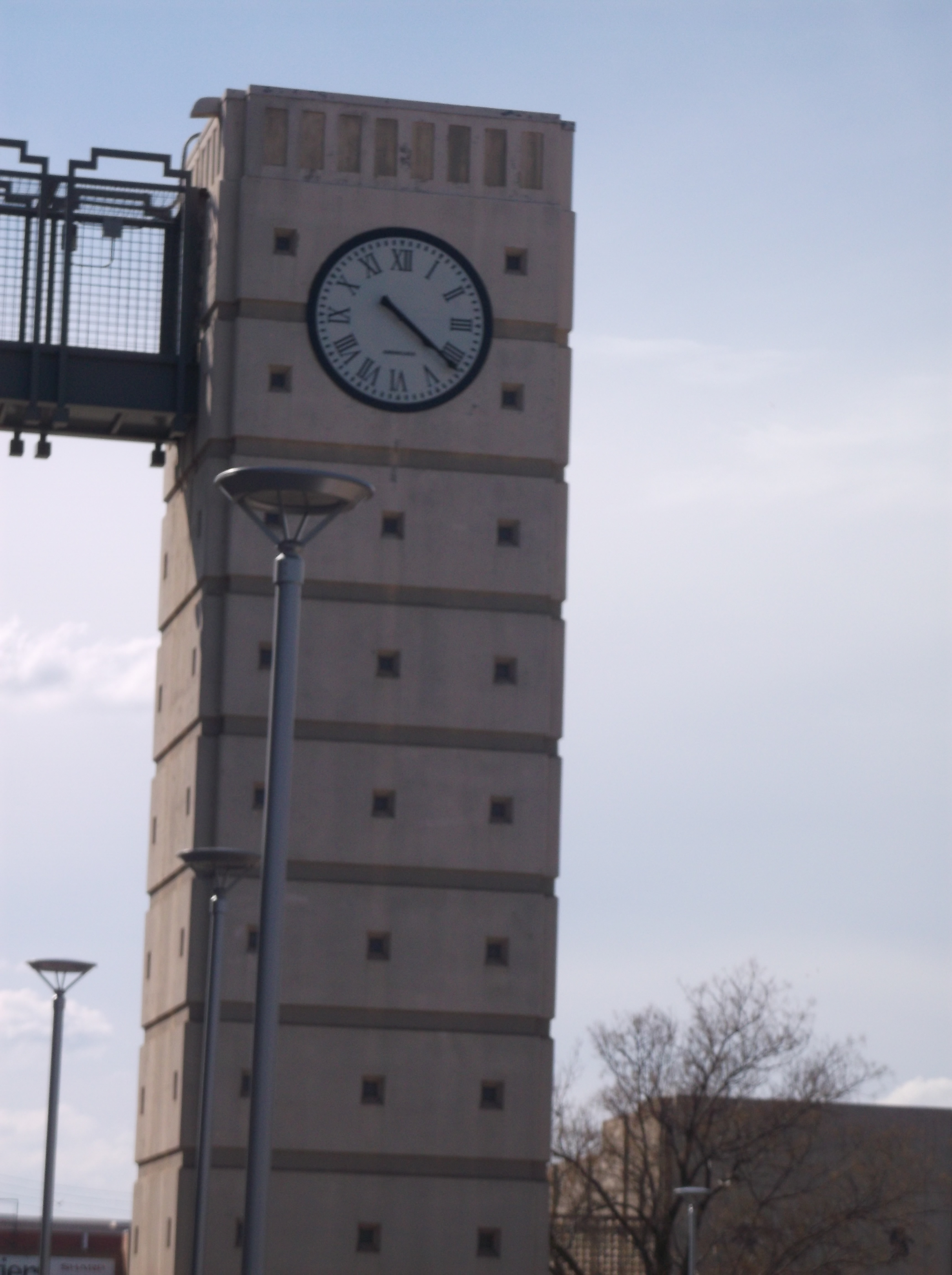
The clock tower

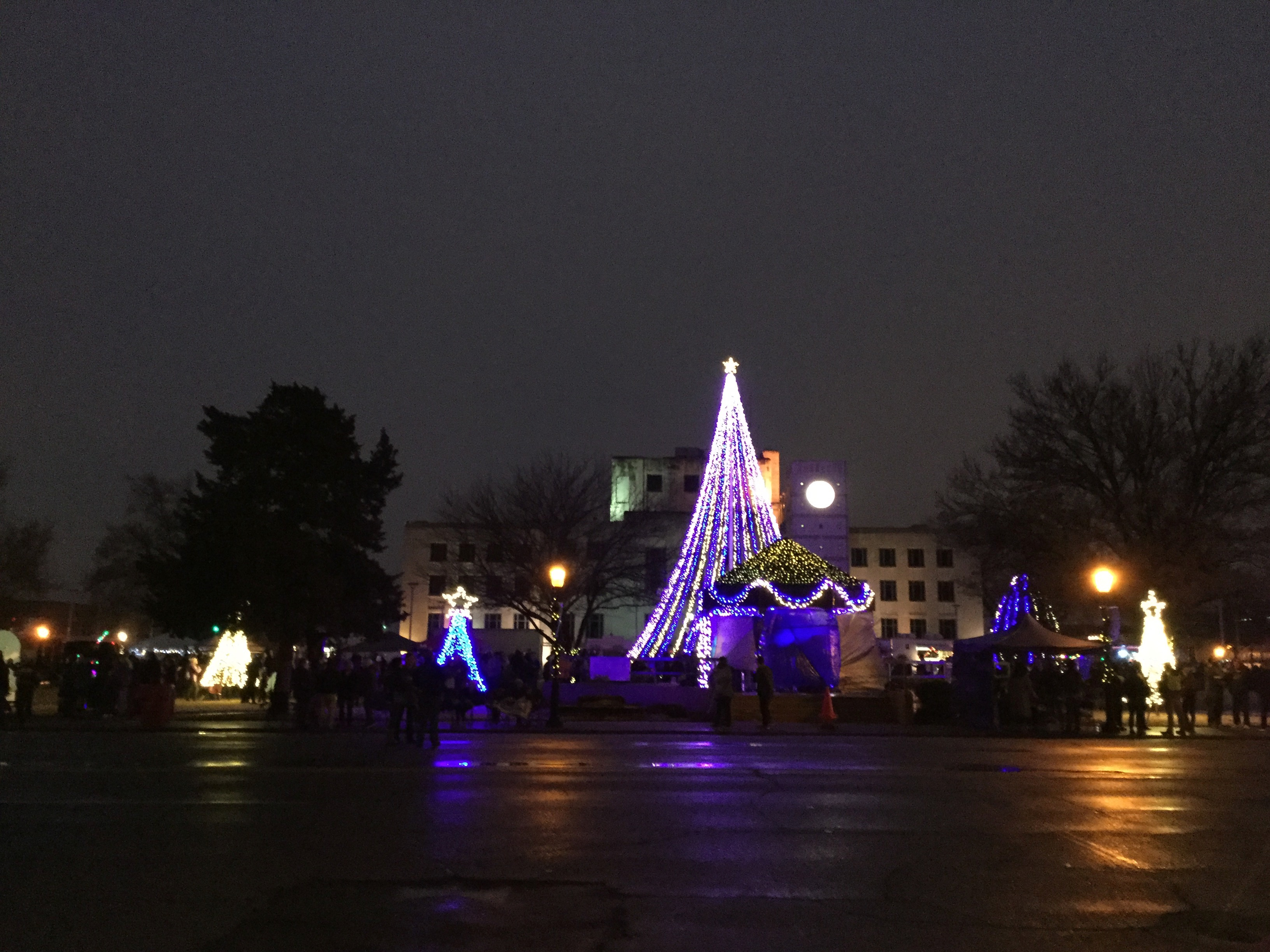
Courthouse at night during Enid Lights Up the Plains

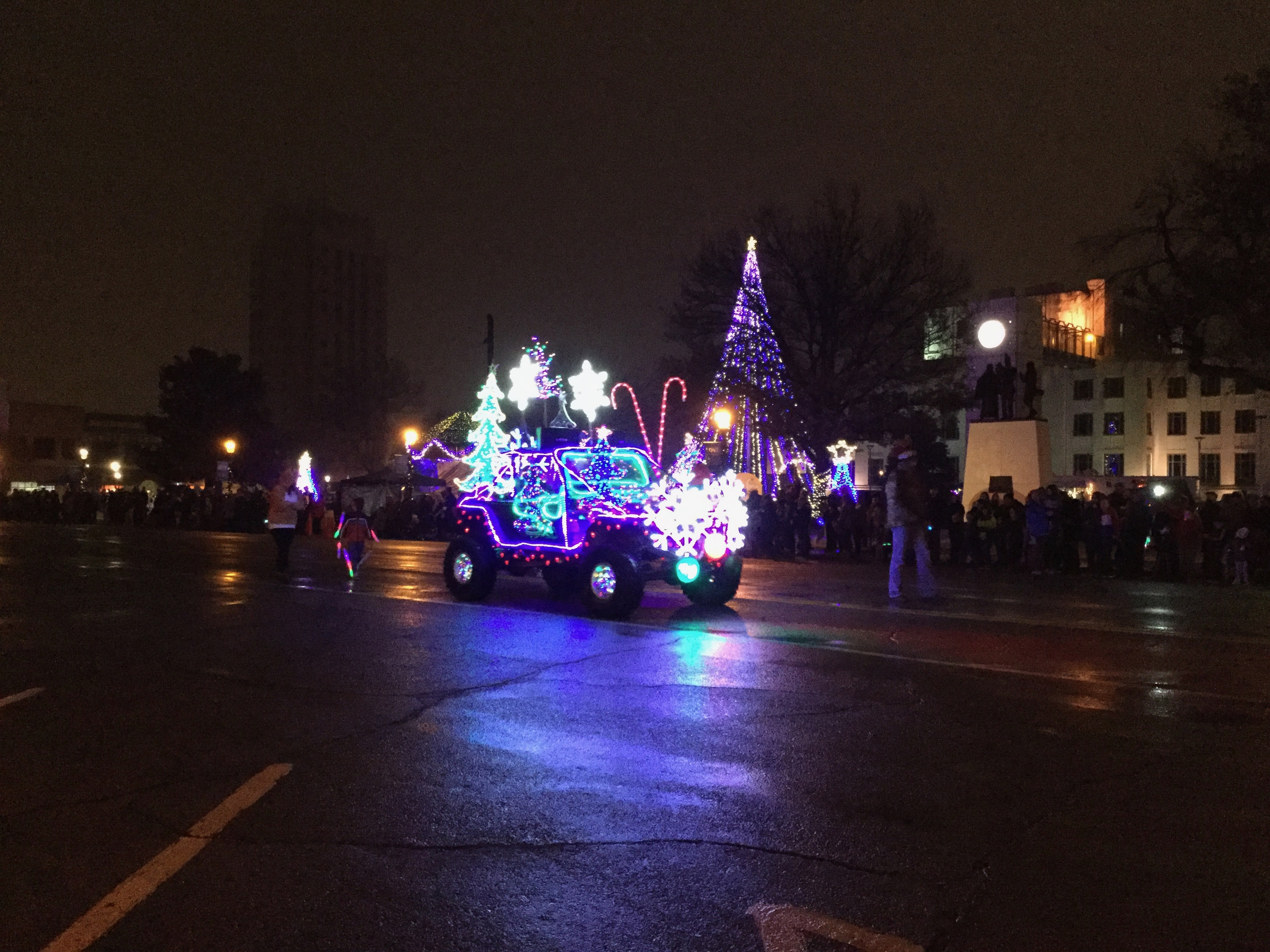
Courthouse in background of Enid Christmas parade
