= Land Run of 1891 =

Settling of Indian reservations in Oklahoma

- Date: September 22, 1891
- Location: Tecumseh, Oklahoma
- Also known as: 1891 Oklahoma Land Rush

The Land Run of 1891 was a set of horse races to settle land acquired by the federal government through the opening of several small Indian reservations in Oklahoma Territory. The race involved approximately 20,000 homesteaders, who gathered to stake their claims on 6,097 plots, of 160 acres (0.65 km^{2}) each, of former reservation land.

The settlement that took place in September 1891 included three land runs. On September 22, 1891, a land run was held to settle Iowa, Sac and Fox, Potawatomi, and Shawnee lands. A September 23, 1891, land run was held to settle Tecumseh, the predesignated location of the county seat of County B, later renamed as Pottawatomie County. Finally, on September 28, 1891, a land run was held to settle Chandler, the predesignated location of the county seat of County A, later renamed as Lincoln County.

These land runs also expanded Payne, Logan, Oklahoma, and Cleveland counties.

== Background ==
The Indian reservation land was broken up through allotment following a proclamation by President Benjamin Harrison. Members of the tribe each received 160 acres (0.65 km^{2}) of land. Once tribe members had each received an allotment, the remaining land was declared surplus, purchased from those tribes and put on the block for sale to settlers who took part in the land run at $1.25 per acre. The Iowa tribe settled for eighty-acre allotments for each of its 86 members and sold the remaining 221,528 acres (896.49 km^{2}) as "surplus" at less than $0.28 per acre. The Sac and Fox agreed to accept 160 acres per member and sold 391,189 acres (1,583.09 km^{2}) at $1.25 per acre. The Citizen Band Potawatomi agreed with the 160-acres per member for 1,498 members. The Absentee Shawnee took 569 allotments and sold the remaining 325,000 acres (1,320 km^{2}) at $0.68 per acre. The Kickapoo tribe did not agree to take their allotments at this time, so their land was not opened until 1895.

== September 22 run ==
Before noon on September 22, 1891, a large number ("thousands") of would-be settlers lined up at various starting points along the western border of the Creek Nation. These points included Oklahoma City, Norman, and Guthrie. No land offices had been established inside the run area (a major change from the 1889 run), so claimants had to travel back to Guthrie or Oklahoma City in order to file their claims.

Two new counties were formed in Oklahoma Territory from the newly-open area: County A (later named Lincoln County) and County B (later named Pottowatomie County). Lands within the boundaries of the two new county seats (Chandler and Tecumseh, respectively) were excluded from this run, allegedly because the towns had not been platted. (Note: The Secretary of the Interior had directed that a separate run would be held for lots in these communities and that only single-entry claimants would be allowed to enter the race.) (Note: The run for lots in Tecumseh was held on September 23, and that for Chandler was on September 28, 1891.)

== See also ==
- Land Run of 1889
- Land Run of 1892
- Land Run of 1893
- Land Run of 1895
