= Land Run of 1892 =

Opening of the Cheyenne-Arapaho Reservation to settlement

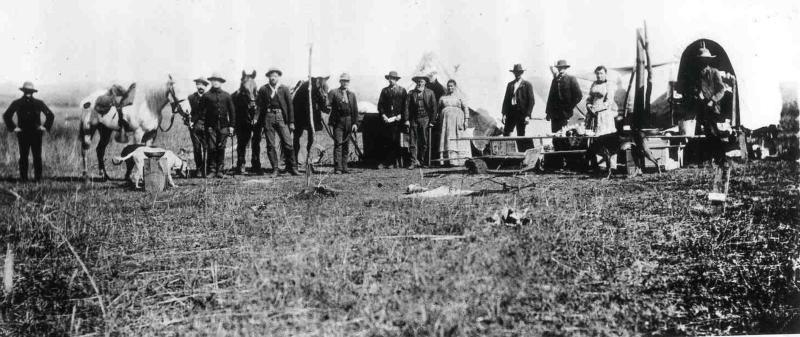
Land Run of Cheyenne and Arapaho land 1892.

The Land Run of 1892 was the opening of the Cheyenne-Arapaho Reservation to settlement in the U.S. state of Oklahoma. One of seven in Oklahoma, it occurred on April 19, 1892, and opened up land that would become Blaine, Custer, Dewey, Washita, and Roger Mills counties. The land run also opened up what would become part of Ellis County, but was designated County "E" and then Day County prior to statehood.

== Background ==
=== Pre Cheyenne and Arapaho ===
The Creek and Seminole were originally relocated to the area that would become the Cheyenne and Arapaho reservations in the 1820s and 1830s, but the Reconstruction Treaties of 1866 took the land away from both tribes.

=== Cheyenne and Arapaho alliance ===
The Cheyenne and Arapaho allied in 1811. The Arapaho were originally located in the Great Plains and western Great Lakes region. It is here that the Cheyenne and Arapaho met and created an alliance. The Cheyenne were originally from the Great Lakes region. Conflicts with the United States government during Red Cloud's War led to the Treaty of Fort Laramie (1851), which gave the Lakota nation the Black Hills. Eventually, the Cheyenne were pushed further into the Colorado region with the Arapaho nation further solidifying their alliance.

=== Cheyenne and Arapaho move to Oklahoma ===
Like many Oklahoma Tribal Nations, the Cheyenne and Arapaho were moved to Oklahoma in the nineteenth century. Several years after the Treaty of Fort Laramie came the Pike's Peak Gold Rush, and settlers began moving in on the Cheyenne and Arapaho's new territory. As a result of settlers encroaching on their land, injuries, and deaths took place among settlers and the Cheyenne. This led to the US Cavalry being called in, and battles ensued between the two sides. The eventual outcome of these battles would be the Sand Creek Massacre, where numerous Cheyenne and Arapaho died, fueling the already intense plains wars. Two treaties resulted from the Sand Creek Massacre: the Little Arkansas Treaty, which was signed to create a reservation near the Colorado area that was never created, and the Treaty of Medicine Lodge, which massively reduced their reservation lands and moved them to Oklahoma.

The reservation had become a part of the federal public domain after The Dawes Act of 1887, which allotted 160 acres (0.65 km2) of 160 acres (0.65 km^{2}) plots to individual Indians. A census was taken of each member of the Cheyenne and Arapaho nations to calculate payment for leftover land to be settled. The remaining land, 3,500,000 acres (14,000 km^{2}) of the Cheyenne and Arapaho Reservation, was sold to the federal government for $1,500,000. The land was opened by a proclamation from U.S. President Benjamin Harrison on April 12, 1892.

== Settlers and developments ==
A diverse group gathered for the land run. It included Kansans, Texans, Missourians, Oklahomans, African-Americans, Swedes, Bohemians, Germans, and Russians. According to Kiowa chief Big Tree, there were "as many [people] as the blades of grass on the Washita in the spring."

=== Counties ===
Six counties were created during the 1892 land run. Blaine, Custer, Dewey, Washita, and Roger Mills.

The county seat of Blaine is Watonga. During settlement, settlers of the area created farms containing wheat, corn, sorghum, cotton, and more. Blaine County had a rich deposit of Gypsum, and the area soon also contained many plaster mills.

Settlers claimed more than 400 lots in what would become Arapaho, the county seat of Custer County. The region was not considered good for farming, making this the only land run Sooners did not participate in. The region became cattle country, due to its geography and the tenacious efforts of cattlemen, who often harassed farmers on the land.

The county seat of Dewey is Taloga. The county had a large number of cattle ranchers, cotton gins, and flour mills.

The country seat of Washita is New Cordell. The county had thousands of people within 24 hours of the land rush and a large portion were Mennonite and German.

The county seat of Roger Mills is Cheyenne. Like many of the other counties created during the 1892 land run, the land was best for cattle ranching, though there was some farming of corn, sorghum, broomcorn, wheat, and cotton.

== See also ==
- Land run
- Land Run of 1889
- Land Run of 1891
- Land Run of 1893
- Land Run of 1895
