= Land Run of 1893 =

Opening of part of the Oklahoma Territory to settlers

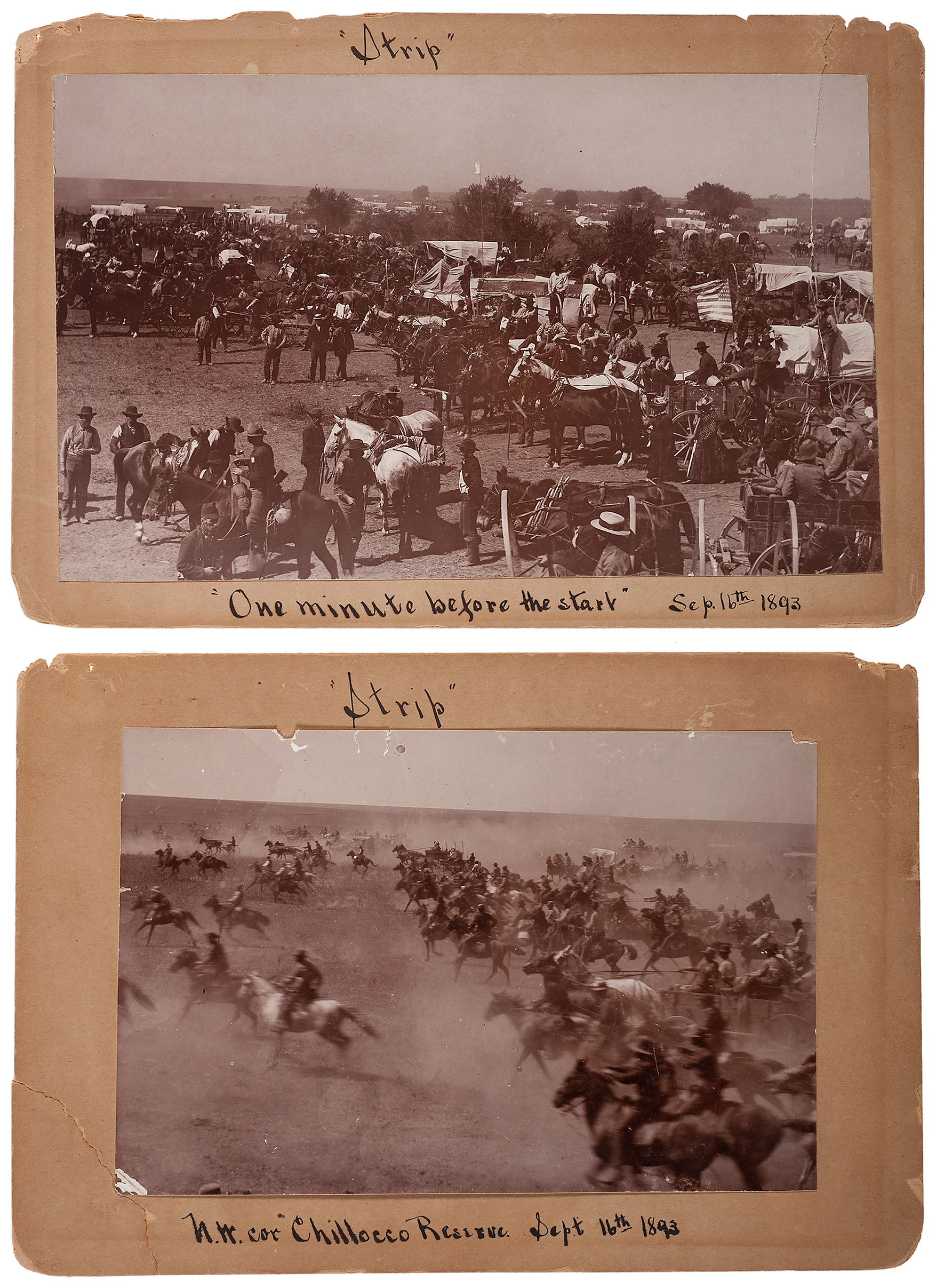
- Date: September 16, 1893
- Location: Oklahoma, U.S.
- Also known as: Cherokee Strip Land Run or Cherokee Outlet Opening

In U.S. history, the Land Run of 1893, also known as the Cherokee Outlet Opening or the Cherokee Strip Land Run, marked the opening to settlement of the Cherokee Outlet in the Oklahoma Territory's fourth and largest land run. It was part of what would later become the U.S. state of Oklahoma in 1907.

== History ==
=== Background ===
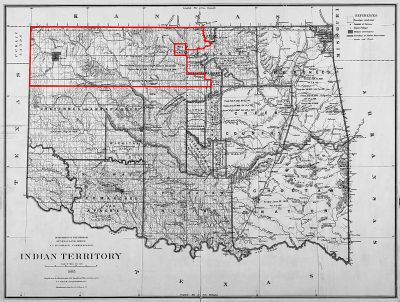
The Cherokee Outlet (1885) outlined in red

The Cherokee Outlet was one of three areas the Cherokee Nation had acquired after resettlement to lands in present-day eastern Oklahoma in 1835 as part of the Treaty of New Echota. Starting with the publication of a Chicago Tribune article in 1879, a growing movement of those pressing for the opening up to homesteading of the unoccupied Unassigned Lands located in Indian Territory – people known as Boomers – began to gain widespread popular political clout. The Boomers' views had already prevailed in convincing the government to open up public domain lands to settlement in the 1880s culminating in the Land Run of 1889.

After the issuance of Benjamin Harrison's Presidential Proclamation, which forbade all grazing leases in the Cherokee Outlet after October 2 of 1890 effectively eliminated tribal profits from cattle leases, the Cherokee came to an agreement to sell these lands to the government at a price ranging from $1.40 to $2.50 per acre the following year. Part of their agreement was that individual Cherokees were permitted to establish claims in the Outlet, an option many of them took advantage of.

At the same time, droughts, sharply declining agricultural prices, and the Panic of 1893 precipitated many to begin gathering in Kansas's boomer camps. Tension was high as the numbers of potential settlers waiting in tents or makeshift dwellings increased in the anticipation running up to the opening up of the last large remaining portion of tillable land that still remained in the public domain.

=== The event ===
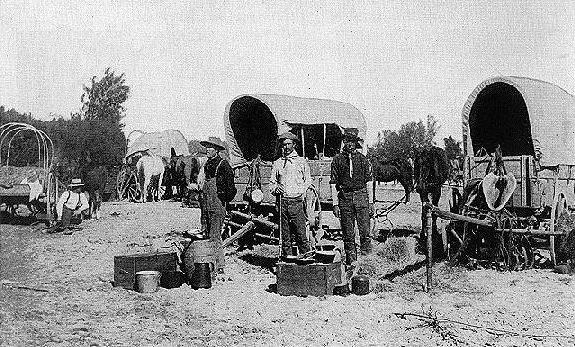
Settlers await the opening of the Cherokee Outlet.

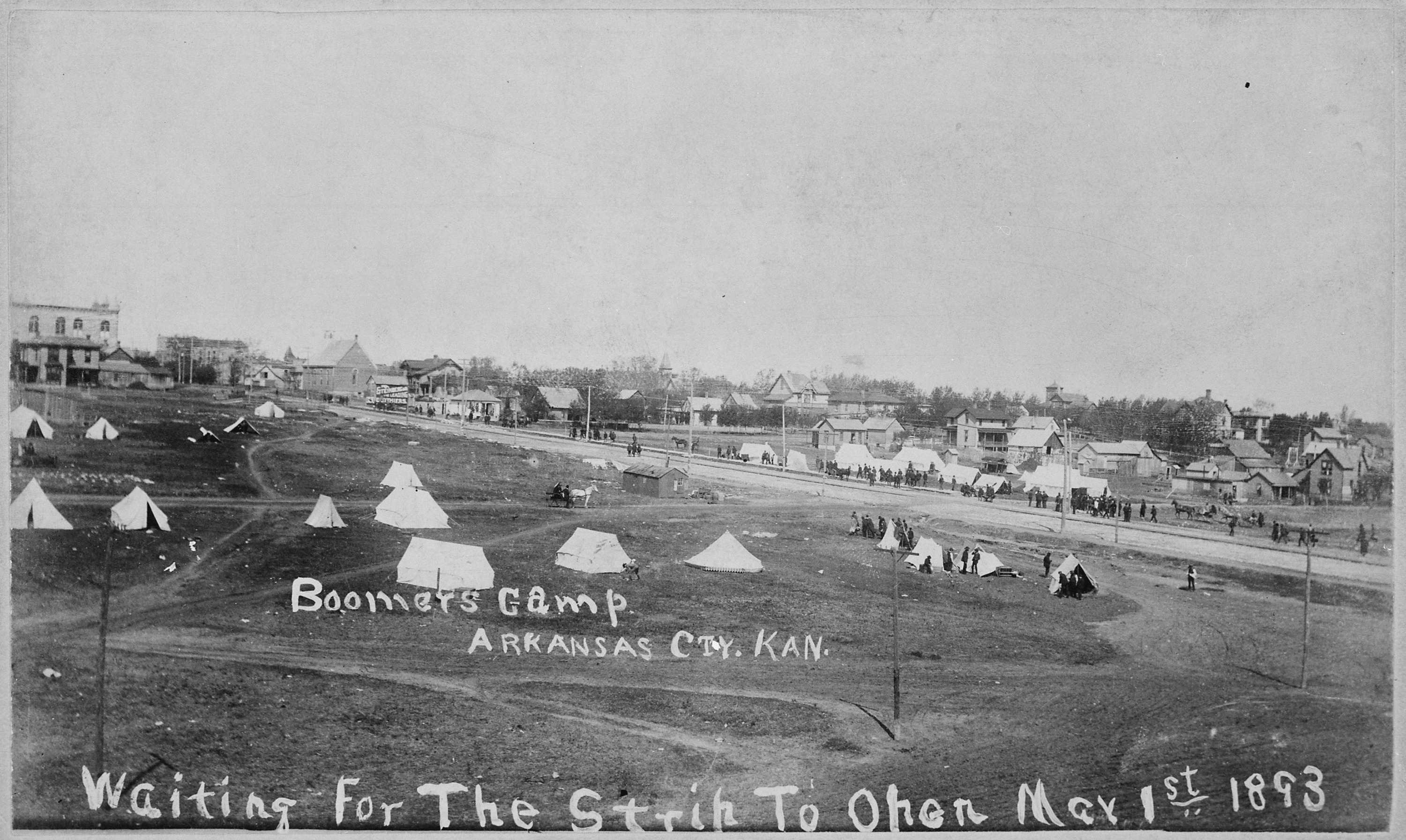
Waiting for the Strip to open, May 1, 1893

The Land Run itself began at noon on September 16, 1893, with an estimated 100,000 participants hoping to stake claim to part of the 6 million acres and 40,000 homesteads on what had formerly been Cherokee grazing land. It would be Oklahoma's fourth and largest land run.

Four United States General Land Offices for the run were specially set up to handle the event – in Perry, Enid, Woodward, and Alva. Infantry troops were stationed at those sites in an attempt to maintain order, while Cavalry troops were stationed at encampments near Alva, Bluff Creek, Chilocco, Clear Creek, Hennessey, Pond Creek, South Wharton, and Waynoka. Despite that, 'Sooners' – those who started before the designated time – still managed to sneak in and secure some of the best locations, especially in the eastern third of the Outlet and at many of the townsites. With demand for the land far outstripping that which was available, a majority of the participants did not actually secure a claim for themselves.

=== Aftermath ===
The counties of Kay, Grant, Woods, Woodward, Garfield, Noble, and Pawnee were named following the run. Prior to the run, these seven counties had been assigned the letters K through Q, respectively. Upon Oklahoma's statehood in 1907, four additional counties – Alfalfa, Ellis, Harper, and Major – were created in the Cherokee Outlet using existing land from Woods, Kay, and Woodward counties.

While there were certainly success stories, not all land claimants found prosperity. Despite the opportunity afforded by free land, many of the new towns were overbuilt, while some farmers found their land claims unsuitable for farming, resulting in many claims being abandoned by the end of the year.

== Depictions in popular culture ==
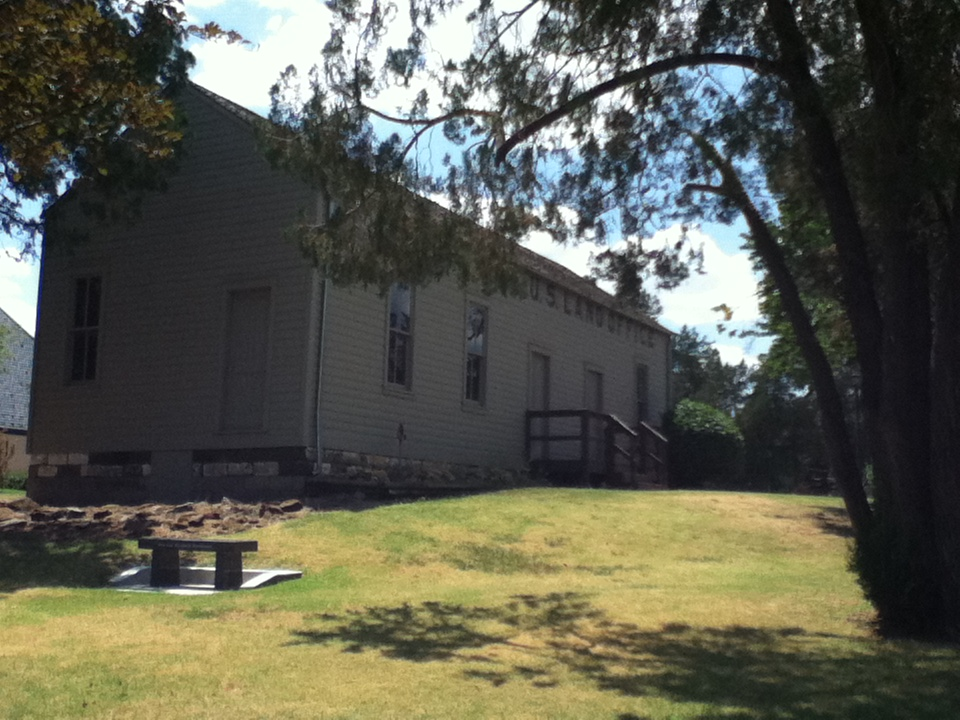
The Garfield County land office now sits in the Humphrey Heritage Village at the Cherokee Strip Regional Heritage Center in Enid, Oklahoma.

- Tumbleweeds, 1925 film
- Cimarron, a 1929 novel by Edna Ferber
  - Cimarron (1931 film)
  - Cimarron (1960 film)
- The New Frontier, 1935 film
- The Oklahoma Kid a 1939 film that fictionalizes some aspects such as placing the future city of Tulsa within the territory
- The Thundering Prairie, a 1969 novel by M. A. Hancock
- Far and Away, a 1992 film

== See also ==
- Land Run of 1891
- Land Run of 1892
- Land Run of 1895
- Oklahoma Territory
