= List of watercourses in Western Australia, R–S =

Western Australia has many watercourses with gazetted names, including rivers, streams, brooks, creeks, gullies, anabranches and backwaters.

This list is complete with respect to the 1996 Gazetteer of Australia. Dubious names have been checked against the online 2004 data, and in all cases confirmed correct. However, if any watercourses have been gazetted or deleted since 1996, this list does not reflect these changes. Strictly speaking, Australian place names are gazetted in capital letters only; the names in this list have been converted to mixed case in accordance with normal capitalisation conventions. Locations are as gazetted; some watercourses may extend over long distances.

== R ==
Name	Latitude	Longitude	Remarks
R B Creek	17° 3' 46" S	128° 54' 34" E	
Rail Creek	14° 41' 35" S	125° 51' 52" E	
Railway Creek	20° 44' 37" S	119° 39' 21" E	
Rain Creek	15° 23' 52" S	126° 52' 38" E	
Ram Creek	21° 43' 14" S	119° 24' 28" E	
Ram Creek	21° 24' 6" S	119° 51' 30" E	
Ram Hole Creek	23° 18' 39" S	117° 0' 34" E	
Ram Paddock Creek	20° 57' 48" S	120° 1' 41" E	
Range Creek	24° 17' 23" S	118° 31' 1" E	
Rebecca Creek	24° 30' 59" S	128° 37' 57" E	
Record Brook	34° 15' 51" S	115° 57' 52" E	
Red Bank Creek	18° 6' 50" S	128° 45' 10" E	
Red Bluff Gully	30° 36' 6" S	121° 41' 37" E	
Red Bull Creek	16° 17' 29" S	125° 5' 10" E	
Red Butte Creek	16° 59' 53" S	128° 45' 36" E	
Red Gully	34° 5' 23" S	115° 38' 29" E	
Red Gully	33° 48' 25" S	115° 3' 18" E	
Red Gully Creek	31° 8' 4" S	115° 45' 0" E	
Red Gully Creek South	31° 5' 10" S	115° 46' 12" E	
Red Hill Creek	21° 51' 29" S	116° 1' 7" E	
Red Hill Gully	33° 58' 55" S	116° 15' 52" E	
Red Mulga Creek	23° 16' 52" S	115° 31' 59" E	
Red Peak Gully	31° 3' 16" S	122° 17' 41" E	
Red Rock Creek	16° 50' 34" S	128° 12' 16" E	
Red Rock Creek	15° 56' 1" S	128° 33' 7" E	
Red Rock Creek	17° 16' 30" S	128° 30' 10" E	
Red Rock Creek	20° 29' 17" S	119° 7' 41" E	
Red Swamp Brook	31° 42' 56" S	116° 18' 49" E	
Redbank Creek	15° 20' 50" S	128° 41' 55" E	
Redman Brook	34° 20' 42" S	115° 9' 24" E	
Redmond Creek	21° 55' 38" S	120° 55' 5" E	
Reedy Creek	15° 29' 54" S	128° 22' 20" E	
Reedy Creek	17° 33' 35" S	127° 54' 24" E	
Reedy Creek	21° 40' 23" S	120° 22' 30" E	
Reetz Creek	28° 8' 42" S	123° 49' 28" E	
Rescue Creek	24° 43' 25" S	128° 52' 58" E	
Revelstoke Creek	31° 46' 47" S	116° 45' 14" E	
Revett Brook	34° 45' 50" S	117° 34' 8" E	
Revolver Creek	16° 15' 43" S	128° 36' 37" E	
Reward Gully	21° 32' 26" S	119° 26' 42" E	
Reynold Creek	23° 53' 53" S	115° 36' 31" E	
Richenda River	17° 24' 14" S	125° 5' 5" E	
Riches Gully	33° 23' 21" S	115° 56' 11" E	
Ridley River	20° 12' 39" S	118° 58' 13" E	
Rifle Range Gully	31° 56' 37" S	116° 8' 9" E	
Rifle Spring Creek	17° 19' 56" S	126° 9' 30" E	
Rivers Creek	15° 37' 15" S	126° 32' 58" E	
Roach Brook	31° 31' 32" S	116° 25' 41" E	
Robe River	21° 18' 53" S	115° 40' 29" E	
Robin Gully	14° 39' 19" S	126° 56' 29" E	
Robinson River	16° 49' 14" S	123° 57' 3" E	
Rock Gully	33° 11' 16" S	117° 31' 31" E	
Rockhole Creek	23° 50' 25" S	116° 5' 18" E	
Rockhole Creek	21° 32' 16" S	119° 35' 37" E	
Rockhole Creek	25° 37' 37" S	121° 46' 14" E	
Rocky Brook	31° 43' 54" S	116° 10' 5" E	
Rocky Brook	33° 31' 30" S	115° 56' 6" E	
Rocky Creek	17° 5' 32" S	128° 11' 15" E	
Rocky Creek	27° 51' 58" S	120° 11' 40" E	
Rocky Creek	20° 40' 19" S	117° 2' 15" E	
Rocky Creek	28° 15' 28" S	119° 38' 15" E	
Rocky Creek	29° 11' 54" S	122° 2' 57" E	
Rocky Creek	31° 33' 34" S	115° 58' 24" E	
Rocky Gully	33° 53' 1" S	115° 40' 34" E	
Rocky Gully	34° 28' 4" S	116° 55' 5" E	
Rocky Gully Creek	31° 52' 52" S	116° 11' 59" E	
Rocky Hole Creek	18° 18' 33" S	127° 12' 20" E	
Roderick River	26° 56' 8" S	116° 13' 24" E	
Roe River	15° 8' 16" S	125° 23' 11" E	
Ron Creek	16° 19' 30" S	125° 37' 50" E	
Rooney Creek	22° 32' 7" S	122° 24' 16" E	
Rosa Brook	34° 4' 1" S	115° 25' 26" E	
Rose Creek	17° 47' 53" S	127° 49' 9" E	
Rosendo Creek	14° 12' 35" S	126° 53' 46" E	
Roses Yard Creek	17° 47' 43" S	127° 48' 30" E	
Rosewood Creek	16° 33' 40" S	126° 55' 2" E	
Round Hole Creek	21° 9' 4" S	117° 26' 47" E	
Rouse Creek	22° 37' 15" S	115° 18' 43" E	
Roy Creek	18° 31' 31" S	128° 40' 18" E	
Roy Creek	17° 32' 26" S	126° 11' 41" E	
Royston Creek	16° 3' 35" S	127° 13' 48" E	
Ruby Creek	26° 6' 26" S	118° 40' 56" E	
Rudall River	22° 10' 28" S	122° 59' 41" E	
Rufous Creek	15° 10' 38" S	125° 32' 25" E	
Rumundana Creek	15° 12' 48" S	127° 48' 38" E	
Running Brook	33° 51' 58" S	115° 54' 19" E	
Rushy Creek	34° 10' 10" S	115° 9' 5" E	
Rushy Gully	28° 28' 18" S	114° 47' 38" E	
Russ Creek	15° 50' 50" S	126° 38' 29" E	
Russell Creek	24° 8' 54" S	115° 36' 18" E	
Russian Jack Creek	22° 10' 38" S	120° 17' 3" E	
Ryan Brook	34° 2' 12" S	117° 9' 53" E	

== S ==
Name	Latitude	Longitude	Remarks
Sabina River	33° 38' 39" S	115° 24' 0" E	
Saddlers Creek	18° 2' 2" S	126° 14' 54" E	
Saint John Brook	33° 58' 26" S	115° 40' 58" E	
Saint Leonards Creek	31° 49' 12" S	115° 59' 18" E	
Saint Luke Brook	33° 52' 22" S	115° 36' 10" E	
Saint Mary River	34° 9' 49" S	119° 34' 22" E	
Saint Paul Brook	33° 54' 7" S	115° 40' 23" E	
Saint Ronans Brook	31° 52' 50" S	116° 34' 35" E	
Sale River	15° 58' 21" S	124° 35' 44" E	
Salmon Brook	33° 24' 47" S	115° 58' 48" E	
Salmon Creek	20° 19' 22" S	118° 32' 16" E	
Salmond River	15° 51' 19" S	127° 53' 51" E	
Salt Bush Creek	29° 19' 2" S	121° 47' 56" E	
Salt Creek	31° 32' 43" S	122° 10' 6" E	
Salt Creek	19° 7' 25" S	126° 2' 3" E	
Salt Creek	27° 54' 20" S	114° 39' 39" E	
Salt Creek	34° 15' 50" S	118° 5' 9" E	
Salt Creek	19° 43' 57" S	121° 23' 57" E	
Salt Creek	33° 30' 27" S	117° 25' 24" E	
Salt Gully	25° 4' 8" S	115° 1' 42" E	
Salt Pan Creek	20° 8' 40" S	127° 30' 56" E	
Salt Pool Creek	17° 6' 23" S	124° 5' 7" E	
Salt River (Great Southern)	31° 48' 29" S	117° 38' 1" E	
Salt River (Mid West)	28° 47' 28" S	116° 19' 39" E	
Salt Spring Gully	34° 16' 31" S	116° 15' 29" E	
Salt Springs Creek	24° 41' 49" S	115° 19' 11" E	
Salt Water Gully	33° 52' 8" S	116° 6' 13" E	
Salt Well Creek	20° 35' 58" S	120° 25' 7" E	
Salt Well Creek	24° 0' 52" S	115° 35' 1" E	
Same Creek	17° 7' 30" S	125° 14' 32" E	
Sampson Creek	20° 52' 25" S	119° 55' 37" E	
Sams Creek	20° 36' 53" S	117° 11' 5" E	
Samson Brook	32° 51' 56" S	115° 55' 31" E	
Samuels Brook	34° 55' 8" S	116° 40' 56" E	
Sand Plain Creek	29° 16' 51" S	115° 12' 21" E	
Sand Plain Creek	32° 21' 43" S	117° 17' 8" E	
Sandy Camp Creek	28° 5' 40" S	122° 9' 54" E	
Sandy Creek	17° 57' 30" S	127° 50' 14" E	
Sandy Creek	21° 8' 27" S	119° 44' 4" E	
Sandy Creek	22° 13' 48" S	119° 23' 31" E	
Sandy Creek	15° 53' 35" S	128° 34' 14" E	
Sandy Creek	15° 23' 22" S	128° 47' 25" E	
Sandy Creek	22° 40' 9" S	115° 40' 49" E	
Sandy Creek	21° 22' 19" S	119° 49' 4" E	
Sandy Creek	21° 11' 13" S	117° 6' 29" E	
Sandy Creek	18° 29' 37" S	127° 30' 57" E	
Sandy Creek	21° 14' 13" S	118° 19' 29" E	
Sandy Creek	16° 49' 37" S	128° 3' 19" E	
Sandy Creek	23° 7' 59" S	120° 47' 54" E	
Sandy Creek	17° 31' 8" S	127° 49' 6" E	
Sandy Creek	17° 56' 1" S	125° 50' 58" E	
Sandy Creek	24° 43' 34" S	116° 3' 8" E	
Sanford River	27° 22' 26" S	115° 53' 49" E	
Sargent Creek	34° 38' 3" S	117° 29' 8" E	
Satirist Creek	21° 1' 44" S	118° 7' 39" E	
Saunders Creek	17° 52' 34" S	128° 3' 12" E	
Saunders Gully	18° 16' 34" S	127° 53' 27" E	
Savages Creek	33° 59' 44" S	116° 13' 16" E	
Savory Creek	23° 21' 31" S	122° 39' 40" E	
Sawpit Gully	31° 43' 54" S	115° 58' 47" E	
Scabby Gully	34° 16' 26" S	116° 2' 19" E	
Scabby Station Gully	28° 39' 36" S	114° 50' 15" E	
Scamp Creek	26° 0' 8" S	126° 32' 45" E	
Scamper Creek	33° 49' 13" S	117° 24' 0" E	
Scandinavian Gully	33° 50' 48" S	116° 4' 53" E	
Schizaea Creek	14° 40' 2" S	126° 55' 44" E	
Schroeder Creek	25° 12' 49" S	116° 3' 38" E	
Scotsdale Brook	34° 56' 43" S	117° 21' 41" E	
Scott Brook	34° 0' 11" S	116° 39' 50" E	
Scott Brook	33° 58' 47" S	116° 41' 14" E	
Scott Creek	33° 56' 37" S	118° 59' 31" E	
Scott River	34° 16' 39" S	115° 11' 56" E	
Scotty Creek	16° 9' 31" S	127° 4' 3" E	
Scotty Creek	28° 10' 9" S	120° 24' 53" E	
Screwdriver Creek	16° 42' 54" S	125° 22' 38" E	
Scrubby Creek	18° 29' 47" S	128° 41' 40" E	
Scully Brook	31° 3' 25" S	116° 20' 1" E	
Scurvy Creek	26° 33' 0" S	120° 32' 36" E	
Second Gully	27° 37' 57" S	114° 11' 29" E	
Sellers Creek	15° 17' 11" S	128° 7' 33" E	
Sermon Gully	31° 47' 22" S	116° 45' 46" E	
Serpentine Creek	22° 26' 26" S	116° 36' 53" E	
Serpentine River	32° 34' 33" S	115° 45' 39" E	
Sesbania Creek	20° 5' 38" S	127° 25' 14" E	
Shallow Well Creek	20° 59' 34" S	120° 10' 6" E	
Shannon River	34° 52' 37" S	116° 23' 34" E	
Shaw Patch Creek	21° 33' 7" S	119° 20' 26" E	
Shaw River	20° 20' 7" S	119° 17' 27" E	
Shea Creek	24° 56' 38" S	116° 15' 38" E	
Shed Mill Creek	25° 10' 40" S	117° 6' 39" E	
Sheepwash Creek	34° 49' 8" S	117° 33' 18" E	
Shenton Gully	27° 50' 7" S	114° 39' 35" E	
Shepherd Gully	31° 42' 12" S	116° 34' 0" E	
Sherlock Gully	32° 18' 5" S	116° 41' 28" E	
Sherlock River	20° 42' 36" S	117° 33' 7" E	
Shiddi Creek	19° 27' 27" S	127° 6' 28" E	
Sholl Creek	25° 57' 28" S	122° 13' 14" E	
Sholl Creek	21° 15' 21" S	115° 54' 55" E	
Shotbolt Creek	23° 18' 19" S	115° 14' 29" E	
Shovelanna Creek	23° 18' 43" S	119° 51' 57" E	
Siddins Creek	16° 55' 3" S	126° 33' 4" E	
Silvain Creek	21° 13' 6" S	117° 21' 50" E	
Silver Creek	31° 21' 2" S	115° 30' 26" E	
Silver Gull Creek	16° 11' 33" S	123° 41' 59" E	
Silver Wattle Gully	33° 20' 43" S	116° 4' 35" E	
Siphon Creek	21° 20' 6" S	117° 9' 4" E	
Skeleton Creek (Newman)	23° 31' 18" S	120° 15' 27" E	
Skeleton Creek (Lake Carnegie)	26° 24' 24" S	122° 27' 0" E	
Skinner Creek	17° 3' 54" S	125° 50' 39" E	
Skipper Creek	26° 54' 19" S	126° 19' 24" E	
Skull Creek	27° 35' 44" S	119° 32' 38" E	Near Laverton, Western Australia
Skull Creek	15° 12' 2" S	129° 0' 0" E	Near Nullagine, Western Australia
Skull Creek (Western Australia)	28° 37' 18" S	122° 19' 28" E	
Slab Gully	32° 7' 37" S	116° 4' 21" E	
Slab Hut Gully	34° 13' 50" S	117° 17' 46" E	
Sladen Water	24° 50' 58" S	128° 9' 12" E	
Slate Quarry Creek	34° 24' 19" S	117° 40' 51" E	
Slatey Creek	16° 22' 20" S	125° 37' 5" E	
Slatey Creek	19° 19' 35" S	128° 37' 8" E	
Slatey Creek	15° 34' 39" S	128° 34' 24" E	
Slaty Creek	17° 5' 38" S	125° 53' 47" E	
Sleeman Creek	34° 50' 39" S	117° 37' 43" E	
Sleeman River	34° 58' 48" S	117° 28' 27" E	
Sligo Creek	28° 49' 14" S	121° 44' 28" E	
Smith Brook	34° 19' 12" S	116° 9' 43" E	
Smith Brook	33° 45' 17" S	116° 3' 48" E	
Smiths Stream	10° 31' 24" S	105° 40' 29" E	
Smoke Creek	16° 35' 46" S	128° 27' 55" E	
Snake Brook	32° 23' 55" S	116° 4' 44" E	
Snake Creek	18° 43' 34" S	126° 55' 37" E	
Snake Creek	16° 54' 7" S	128° 19' 1" E	
Snake Creek	16° 33' 25" S	126° 19' 41" E	
Snake Creek	18° 7' 53" S	124° 2' 34" E	
Snake Gully	34° 38' 12" S	116° 20' 8" E	
Snake Gully	34° 29' 29" S	116° 11' 0" E	
Soak Creek	21° 15' 58" S	120° 6' 31" E	
Soda Creek	20° 40' 52" S	119° 50' 48" E	
Soda Creek	15° 43' 46" S	128° 16' 11" E	
Soda Creek	16° 19' 16" S	128° 54' 59" E	
Soda Spring Creek	16° 33' 3" S	128° 29' 53" E	
Soda Spring Creek	18° 23' 6" S	126° 59' 45" E	
Solomon Brook	31° 16' 27" S	116° 28' 35" E	
Solomons Gully	32° 4' 46" S	116° 51' 35" E	
Sophia River	33° 15' 31" S	115° 57' 7" E	
Sophie Creek	21° 26' 27" S	117° 2' 44" E	
South Creek	20° 20' 58" S	118° 34' 47" E	
South Dandalup River	32° 35' 14" S	115° 53' 27" E	
South East Creek	20° 20' 48" S	118° 35' 58" E	
South Warriup Creek	34° 42' 49" S	118° 31' 3" E	
South West Bay Gully	33° 59' 17" S	119° 2' 49" E	
South West Creek	20° 21' 32" S	118° 33' 6" E	
South West Creek	23° 57' 46" S	115° 23' 16" E	
Southern Brook	31° 28' 48" S	116° 44' 0" E	
Southern River	32° 3' 45" S	115° 58' 48" E	
Spear Creek	16° 49' 31" S	125° 37' 27" E	
Spear Hill Gully	21° 29' 3" S	119° 24' 20" E	
Spearhole Creek	23° 31' 19" S	119° 33' 56" E	
Spearwood Brook	34° 45' 52" S	116° 48' 15" E	
Spearwood Creek	34° 4' 10" S	115° 18' 40" E	
Spencers Brook	31° 43' 22" S	116° 39' 24" E	
Spice Brook	31° 26' 51" S	116° 5' 52" E	
Spider Creek	17° 37' 13" S	126° 9' 0" E	
Spider Creek	16° 58' 13" S	125° 26' 49" E	
Spider Creek	22° 4' 48" S	120° 43' 19" E	
Spinaway Creek	21° 33' 16" S	119° 54' 45" E	
Spitfire Creek	15° 20' 54" S	125° 5' 19" E	
Split Rock Creek	21° 30' 49" S	119° 34' 2" E	
Split Rock Creek	21° 29' 6" S	119° 32' 9" E	
Sprigg River	16° 47' 9" S	125° 3' 22" E	
Spring Camp Creek	24° 54' 0" S	116° 34' 4" E	
Spring Creek	16° 20' 57" S	128° 54' 28" E	
Spring Creek	33° 52' 31" S	115° 59' 21" E	
Spring Creek	34° 36' 50" S	116° 37' 4" E	
Spring Creek	18° 16' 17" S	127° 51' 50" E	
Spring Creek	16° 44' 22" S	128° 45' 20" E	
Spring Creek	33° 54' 15" S	118° 57' 36" E	
Spring Creek	19° 9' 17" S	125° 34' 0" E	
Spring Creek	18° 28' 14" S	126° 34' 54" E	
Spring Creek	16° 42' 38" S	125° 47' 34" E	
Spring Creek	22° 55' 55" S	118° 9' 1" E	
Spring Creek	17° 27' 31" S	128° 0' 39" E	
Spring Creek	16° 9' 47" S	127° 6' 29" E	
Spring Creek	15° 36' 24" S	128° 41' 0" E	
Spring Creek	24° 5' 12" S	116° 23' 19" E	
Spring Creek	20° 59' 6" S	119° 6' 24" E	
Spring Creek	16° 49' 14" S	128° 34' 14" E	
Spring Gully	34° 29' 6" S	116° 5' 44" E	
Spring Gully Creek	33° 50' 55" S	116° 0' 55" E	
Springer Creek	23° 56' 40" S	115° 22' 6" E	
The Springs Creek	21° 10' 59" S	117° 12' 59" E	
Springy Creek	29° 13' 44" S	115° 6' 23" E	
Stag Arrow Creek	22° 45' 10" S	121° 8' 57" E	
Starting Creek	33° 5' 40" S	116° 42' 4" E	
Station Creek	18° 10' 48" S	125° 35' 57" E	
Station Creek	15° 6' 56" S	128° 34' 31" E	
Station Creek	17° 21' 24" S	126° 6' 12" E	
Station Creek	28° 48' 40" S	121° 14' 28" E	
Station Creek	16° 47' 25" S	128° 50' 53" E	
Station Creek	17° 11' 33" S	124° 27' 59" E	
Station Creek	18° 16' 26" S	127° 17' 15" E	
Station Creek	17° 3' 3" S	128° 34' 9" E	
Station Creek	16° 44' 10" S	125° 55' 38" E	
Station Gully	33° 41' 11" S	115° 7' 50" E	
Steel Star Creek	20° 53' 41" S	117° 57' 23" E	
Steere River	33° 53' 22" S	120° 5' 23" E	
Stein Creek	18° 41' 13" S	126° 38' 19" E	
Stevenson Creek	33° 38' 24" S	119° 56' 57" E	
Stewart Creek	26° 13' 10" S	127° 6' 49" E	
Stewart River	16° 49' 21" S	123° 56' 31" E	
Stewart Well Creek	21° 5' 17" S	117° 26' 50" E	
Stingray Creek	20° 19' 52" S	118° 37' 6" E	
Stinkwoods Brook	33° 14' 29" S	116° 21' 51" E	
Stinton Creek	32° 7' 0" S	116° 6' 33" E	
Stock Route Creek	22° 14' 26" S	120° 41' 46" E	
Stockade Creek	16° 22' 2" S	128° 53' 14" E	
Stockman Creek	15° 41' 58" S	128° 40' 34" E	
Stockyard Creek	33° 57' 50" S	116° 3' 40" E	
Stockyard Creek	33° 50' 45" S	122° 5' 3" E	
Stockyard Creek	16° 47' 37" S	125° 57' 11" E	
Stockyard Creek	21° 45' 43" S	121° 3' 28" E	
Stockyard Creek	23° 20' 38" S	116° 35' 6" E	
Stockyard Gully	29° 56' 26" S	115° 6' 24" E	
Stones Brook	33° 22' 45" S	115° 56' 5" E	
Stonewall Creek	15° 57' 20" S	128° 45' 42" E	
Stoney Creek	15° 58' 4" S	127° 54' 8" E	
Stoneyard Creek	20° 40' 29" S	119° 57' 4" E	
Stonington Creek	18° 4' 48" S	127° 40' 22" E	
Stony Brook	32° 7' 34" S	116° 2' 42" E	
Stony Creek	32° 54' 47" S	116° 17' 32" E	
Stony Creek	23° 19' 48" S	117° 44' 0" E	
Stony Creek	17° 54' 47" S	125° 53' 50" E	
Stony Creek	33° 55' 48" S	115° 47' 43" E	
Stony Creek	17° 54' 47" S	126° 6' 41" E	
Stony Creek	34° 37' 7" S	118° 1' 5" E	
Stony Creek	21° 22' 7" S	120° 18' 15" E	
Storm Camp Creek	16° 54' 17" S	128° 18' 51" E	
Storm Creek	17° 6' 56" S	125° 38' 22" E	
Strawberry Creek	21° 31' 17" S	119° 32' 41" E	
Streams Gully	21° 33' 26" S	119° 25' 26" E	
Strelley River	20° 21' 39" S	119° 11' 45" E	
Strelley River East	20° 27' 3" S	119° 12' 50" E	
Strelley River West	20° 23' 41" S	119° 11' 36" E	
Strelly Brook	31° 51' 28" S	116° 1' 0" E	
Strossel Creek	23° 51' 58" S	115° 25' 5" E	
Strutton Creek	20° 56' 45" S	120° 3' 36" E	
Stumpy Creek	16° 28' 28" S	125° 32' 55" E	
Stumpy Creek	17° 10' 51" S	124° 28' 30" E	
Stumpy Creek	17° 14' 10" S	125° 52' 3" E	
Sturcke Creek	34° 3' 41" S	115° 40' 39" E	
Sturt Creek	20° 5' 42" S	127° 20' 45" E	
Styx River	34° 53' 14" S	117° 5' 16" E	
Sullivan Creek	28° 50' 1" S	121° 10' 8" E	
Sullivan Creek	25° 1' 55" S	117° 25' 44" E	
Sullivan Creek	16° 32' 47" S	126° 29' 5" E	
Sullivan Creek	16° 17' 54" S	126° 51' 28" E	
Summer Brook	33° 4' 12" S	115° 56' 39" E	
Sump Creek	16° 26' 10" S	126° 25' 7" E	
Sunbeam Creek	24° 59' 2" S	122° 18' 22" E	
Sunday (Middle) Creek	15° 55' 3" S	128° 24' 49" E	
Sunday Creek	22° 17' 53" S	122° 22' 7" E	
Surprise Creek	17° 21' 58" S	125° 9' 54" E	
Surprise Creek	15° 11' 7" S	128° 39' 18" E	
Survey Creek	17° 13' 33" S	127° 47' 17" E	
Susannah Brook	31° 49' 29" S	116° 0' 33" E	
Susetta River	34° 0' 38" S	119° 26' 53" E	
Suzy Creek	16° 10' 20" S	127° 1' 43" E	
Swamp Oak Brook	32° 47' 22" S	116° 6' 46" E	
Swampy Creek	33° 17' 55" S	116° 49' 10" E	
Swan River	31° 59' 25" S	115° 50' 7" E	
Swanson Creek	27° 55' 37" S	122° 14' 29" E	
Sweeney Creek	25° 45' 32" S	120° 43' 38" E	
Swider Creek	14° 51' 1" S	126° 46' 43" E	
Swift Creek	16° 38' 34" S	124° 31' 10" E	
Swincer Creek	28° 18' 11" S	122° 19' 35" E	
Swincer Creek	28° 24' 6" S	123° 16' 53" E	
Sydney Creek	16° 18' 17" S	128° 55' 36" E	
Sydneys Dale	10° 29' 17" S	105° 33' 9" E	
Sylvania Creek	23° 33' 21" S	119° 52' 4" E	
Synnot Creek	16° 24' 8" S	125° 9' 25" E	

== See also ==
- Geography of Western Australia
