= Breckinridge, Oklahoma =

- Town
- Location in Garfield County and the state of Oklahoma.
- Coordinates: 36°26′13″N 97°43′54″W
- Country: United States
- State: Oklahoma
- County: Garfield

Area
  - Total: 15.29 sq mi (39.59 km^{2})
  - Land: 15.23 sq mi (39.45 km^{2})
  - Water: 0.058 sq mi (0.15 km^{2})
- Elevation: 1,198 ft (365 m)

Population (2020)
  - Total: 199
  - Density: 13.1/sq mi (5.04/km^{2})
- Time zone: UTC-6 (Central (CST))
  - Summer (DST): UTC-5 (CDT)
- FIPS code: 40-08600
- GNIS feature ID: 1090465

Breckinridge, sometimes spelled Breckenridge, is a town in Garfield County, Oklahoma, United States. The population was 199 as of the 2020 Census.

== History ==
The Enid and Tonkawa Railway (later sold to the Chicago, Rock Island and Pacific Railway) built though the area in 1899 during construction of its line from North Enid to Billings. So, when the Blackwell, Enid and Southwestern Railroad (later the St. Louis and San Francisco Railway) also built a branch through the area in the 1900-1901 timeframe from Blackwell through Hunter and Enid to the town of Darrow, the two railroads intersected at Breckinridge's location. The Frisco Town Company platted the locale in March 1901, and named it for Breckinridge Jones, who was president of the Mississippi Valley Trust Company of St. Louis, Missouri and a major railroad investor. The post office originally used the "Breckenridge" spelling, but two months later changed over to the "Breckinridge" spelling.

The town's population fell as low as 42 in the 1960 Census, and the post office closed on November 22, 1963. However, the town rebounded after a large ammonium nitrate fertilizer plant was constructed east of Enid in the 1970's.

== Geography ==
Breckinridge is east of Enid and north of US Route 412 on North 102nd St.

According to the United States Census Bureau, the town has a total area of 15.2 square miles (39 km^{2}), of which 15.1 square miles (39 km^{2}) is land and 0.1 square miles (0.26 km^{2}) (0.33%) is water.

== Demographics ==
Historical population
Census	Pop.	Note	%±
1920	132		—
1930	76		−42.4%
1940	80		5.3%
1950	67		−16.2%
1960	42		−37.3%
1970	261		521.4%
1980	261		0.0%
1990	251		−3.8%
2000	239		−4.8%
2010	245		2.5%
2020	199		−18.8%

As of the census of 2000, there were 239 people, 94 households, and 73 families residing in the town. The population density was 15.8 people per square mile (6.1/km^{2}). There were 106 housing units at an average density of 7.0 per square mile (2.7/km^{2}). The racial makeup of the town was 92.89% White, 2.93% Native American, 1.67% from other races, and 2.51% from two or more races. Hispanic or Latino of any race were 2.09% of the population.

There were 94 households, out of which 33.0% had children under the age of 18 living with them, 68.1% were married couples living together, 7.4% had a female householder with no husband present, and 22.3% were non-families. 21.3% of all households were made up of individuals, and 9.6% had someone living alone who was 65 years of age or older. The average household size was 2.54 and the average family size was 2.95.

In the town, the population was spread out, with 25.9% under the age of 18, 5.0% from 18 to 24, 29.3% from 25 to 44, 27.6% from 45 to 64, and 12.1% who were 65 years of age or older. The median age was 40 years. For every 100 females, there were 97.5 males. For every 100 females age 18 and over, there were 94.5 males.

The median income for a household in the town was $35,000, and the median income for a family was $43,125. Males had a median income of $33,333 versus $23,125 for females. The per capita income for the town was $15,580. About 10.7% of families and 14.4% of the population were below the poverty line, including 22.6% of those under the age of eighteen and 4.3% of those 65 or over.

== Education ==
Most of Breckenridge is in the Garber Public Schools school district. A portion in the northeast is within Kremlin-Hillsdale Schools.
