= Chisholm High School =

Coordinates: 36.463579°N 97.928141°W

Location
- 4018 W. Carrier Rd. Enid, Oklahoma 73703; United States

Information
- Established: 1973
- School district: Chisholm Public Schools
- Staff: 21.00 (FTE)
- Grades: 9-12
- Enrollment: 327 (2023-2024)
- Student to teacher ratio: 15.57
- Colors: Columbia Blue, White, and Red
- Mascot: Longhorn
- Newspaper: Longhorn Trail
- Website: chisholm.k12.ok.us

Chisholm High School (founded in 1973) is the second largest high school in Enid, Oklahoma. Located in the northern part of the city, it has a student body of approximately 300 in grades 9–12 with a curriculum including normal and AP academic courses.

In addition to northern Chisholm, the school's boundary includes Carrier and North Enid.

== Athletics ==
Chisholm's athletic programs include football, basketball, baseball, softball, track and field, cross country, bowling, volleyball, tennis and cheerleading.

Chisholm holds state championship banners in track and field (1989) and cross country (2014). They dominated the 3A state meet with a final winning score of 45–56. Carrier High School, Chisholm's predecessor, held a banner in girls' basketball for 1970.
