= Red Rock Creek =

Location
- Country: United States

Physical characteristics
- Source
  - location: Northeast of Breckenridge, Oklahoma
- Mouth: Arkansas River
  - location: South of Ponca City, Oklahoma
  - coordinates: 36°28′06″N 96°59′15″W

Red Rock Creek rises in the middle of Garfield County in Oklahoma, and proceeds generally east through Garfield and Noble counties on a 45-to-50 mile course taking it just past the Noble-Pawnee county line to drain into the Arkansas River. Specifically, the creek originates northeast of Breckenridge, Oklahoma and south of Hunter, Oklahoma, and continues east past the northern limit of Red Rock, Oklahoma before emptying into the Arkansas River just northeast of Sooner Lake.

The creek and its tributaries were historically prone to flooding. The Lower Red Rock Creek Watershed, essentially located in the east half of Noble County to the Arkansas River and consisting of 116,582 acres of drainage area, had 5 major floods and 95 minor floods from 1935 to 1954. The Upper Red Rock Creek Watershed had 14 major floods and 129 smaller floods in the same period. Numbers of small dams and containment reservoirs have therefore been built; for instance, in the 197,376-acre Upper Red Rock Creek Watershed, 43 dams were constructed by 2006–25 in Garfield and 18 in Noble—with 13 additional dams planned. A few examples are:

Lower Red Rock Creek Site 21 Reservoir (Noble Co., 14 acres)

Upper Red Rock Creek Site 13 Reservoir (Noble Co., 10 acres)

Upper Red Rock Creek Site 32 Reservoir (Garfield Co., 20 acres)

Upper Red Rock Creek Site 46 Reservoir (Garfield Co., 30 acres)
