= Garfield County, Oklahoma =

County in Oklahoma, United States

- County
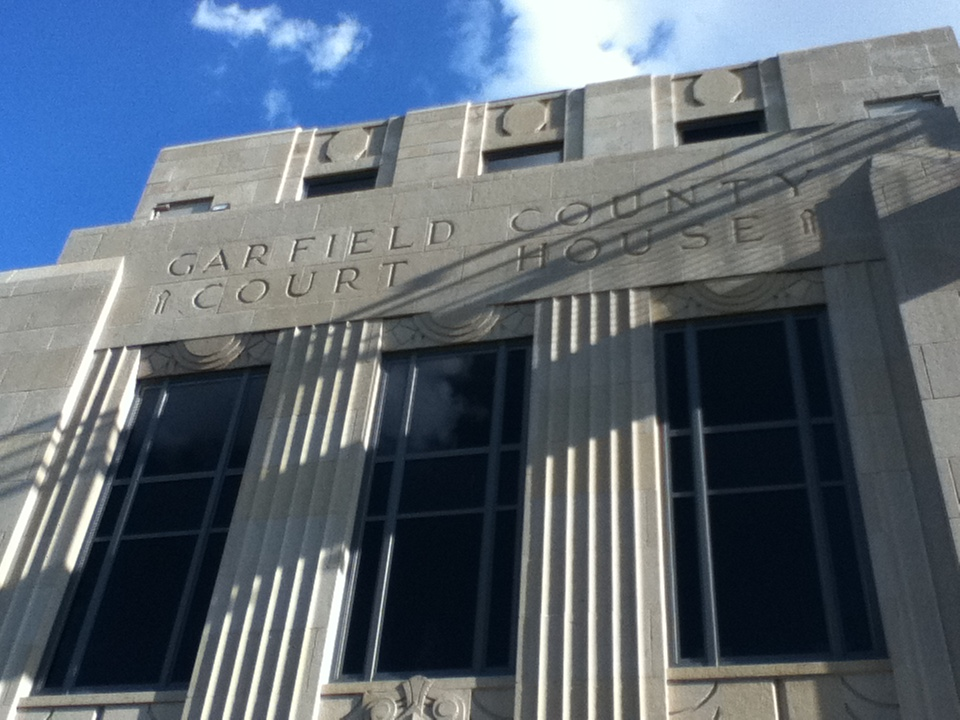
- Garfield County Courthouse in Enid (2011)

- Location within the U.S. state of Oklahoma
- Coordinates: 36°23′N 97°47′W
- Country: United States
- State: Oklahoma
- Founded: 1893
- Named for: James A. Garfield
- Seat: Enid
- Largest city: Enid

Area
  - Total: 1,060 sq mi (2,700 km^{2})
  - Land: 1,058 sq mi (2,740 km^{2})
  - Water: 1.6 sq mi (4.1 km^{2}) 0.2%

Population (2020)
  - Total: 62,846
  - Estimate (2025): 61,779 ▼
  - Density: 59/sq mi (23/km^{2})
- Time zone: UTC−6 (Central)
  - Summer (DST): UTC−5 (CDT)
- Congressional district: 3rd
- Website: www.garfieldok.com

Garfield County is a county located in the U.S. state of Oklahoma. As of the 2020 census, the population was 62,846. Its county seat is Enid. The county is named after President James A. Garfield. Garfield County comprises the Enid, OK metropolitan statistical area.

Prior to the Land Run of 1893, Garfield County was named O County and was part of the Cherokee Outlet, occupied by the Cherokee people following the Treaty of New Echota and the Cherokee trail of tears. Historically, the area was a hunting ground for the Wichita, Osage, and Kiowa tribes.

The Chisholm Trail, stage coach lines, mail routes, and railroads passed through stations at Buffalo Springs and Skeleton, today known as Bison and Enid. Railroad development in the county began four years prior to the land opening. Enid became a central hub within the county. Historical railroads included Enid and Tonkawa Railway, Enid and Anadarko Railway, Blackwell, Enid and Southwestern Railway, Enid Central Railway and the Denver, Enid and Gulf Railroad.

== Geography ==
According to the U.S. Census Bureau, the county has a total area of 1,060 square miles (2,700 km^{2}), of which 1,058 square miles (2,740 km^{2}) is land and 1.6 square miles (4.1 km^{2}) (0.2%) is water. Several creeks run through the county, including Black Bear, Boggy, Red Rock, Rock, Skeleton, and Turkey.

Garfield County Fair 2026 at Chisholm Trail Expo Center in Enid, Oklahoma.

=== Adjacent counties ===
- Grant County (north)
- Noble County (east)
- Logan County (southeast)
- Kingfisher County (south)
- Major County (west)
- Alfalfa County (northwest)

=== Major highways ===
- U.S. Highway 60
- U.S. Highway 64
- U.S. Highway 81
- U.S. Highway 412
- State Highway 15
- State Highway 45
- State Highway 74
- State Highway 132
- State Highway 164

== Demographics ==
Historical population
Census	Pop.	Note	%±
1890	22,076		—
1900	10,037		−54.5%
1910	33,050		229.3%
1920	37,500		13.5%
1930	45,588		21.6%
1940	45,484		−0.2%
1950	52,820		16.1%
1960	52,975		0.3%
1970	55,365		4.5%
1980	62,820		13.5%
1990	56,735		−9.7%
2000	57,813		1.9%
2010	60,580		4.8%
2020	62,846		3.7%
2025 (est.)	61,779	▼	−1.7%
U.S. Decennial Census; 1790-1960 1900-1990; 1990-2000 2010

=== 2020 census ===
As of the 2020 United States census, the county had a population of 62,846. Of the residents, 26.0% were under the age of 18 and 16.6% were 65 years of age or older; the median age was 36.3 years. For every 100 females there were 99.0 males, and for every 100 females age 18 and over there were 97.9 males.

The racial makeup of the county was 72.1% White, 2.8% Black or African American, 2.5% American Indian and Alaska Native, 1.1% Asian, 6.5% from some other race, and 10.3% from two or more races. Hispanic or Latino residents of any race comprised 14.3% of the population.

There were 24,198 households in the county, of which 32.9% had children under the age of 18 living with them and 25.4% had a female householder with no spouse or partner present. About 28.9% of all households were made up of individuals and 12.7% had someone living alone who was 65 years of age or older.

There were 27,846 housing units, of which 13.1% were vacant. Among occupied housing units, 64.7% were owner-occupied and 35.3% were renter-occupied. The homeowner vacancy rate was 2.7% and the rental vacancy rate was 15.3%.

The most reported ancestries in 2020 were English (18.5%), German (16.4%), Mexican (11.9%), Irish (11%), Marshallese (4.6%), and African American (2.5%).

=== 2000 census ===
As of the census of 2000, there were 57,813 people, 23,175 households, and 15,805 families residing in the county. The population density was 55 people per square mile (21 people/km^{2}). There were 26,047 housing units at an average density of 25 units per square mile (9.7/km^{2}). The racial makeup of the county was 88.65% White, 3.26% Black or African American, 2.11% Native American, 0.85% Asian, 0.49% Pacific Islander, 2.02% from other races, and 2.62% from two or more races; 4.13% of the population were Hispanic or Latino of any race.

In 2000, there were 23,175 households, out of which 31.40% had children under the age of 18 living with them, 54.20% were married couples living together, 10.50% had a female householder with no husband present, and 31.80% were non-families. 27.70% of all households were made up of individuals, and 12.10% had someone living alone who was 65 years of age or older. The average household size was 2.42 and the average family size was 2.95. In the county, the population was spread out, with 25.00% under the age of 18, 9.10% from 18 to 24, 27.30% from 25 to 44, 22.50% from 45 to 64, and 16.00% who were 65 years of age or older. The median age was 38 years. For every 100 females there were 93.70 males. For every 100 females age 18 and over, there were 90.40 males.

As of 2000, the median income for a household in the county was $33,006, and the median income for a family was $39,872. Males had a median income of $29,921 versus $20,791 for females. The per capita income for the county was $17,457. About 10.50% of families and 13.90% of the population were below the poverty line, including 19.70% of those under age 18 and 10.40% of those age 65 or over.

=== 2021 estimates ===
By 2021 census estimates, its median household income increased to $60,732, and the county had a poverty rate of 12.9%.

== Politics ==
Garfield County is one of the most Republican counties in Oklahoma. It has only supported a Democrat for president twice since statehood, during Franklin Roosevelt's landslide victories in 1932 and 1936. A Democrat has only managed as much as 40 percent of the county's vote twice since FDR's death, in 1948 and 1964.

United States presidential election results for Garfield County, Oklahoma
Year	Republican		Democratic		Third party(ies)	
Year	No.	%	No.	%	No.	%
1908	2,924	50.36%	2,618	45.09%	264	4.55%
1912	2,900	50.71%	2,353	41.14%	466	8.15%
1916	2,854	48.41%	2,347	39.81%	694	11.77%
1920	6,611	60.89%	3,671	33.81%	576	5.30%
1924	7,524	56.28%	3,791	28.36%	2,054	15.36%
1928	12,748	77.77%	3,503	21.37%	141	0.86%
1932	6,837	38.82%	10,773	61.18%	0	0.00%
1936	7,457	39.83%	11,142	59.51%	124	0.66%
1940	10,792	52.64%	9,544	46.55%	166	0.81%
1944	11,211	58.53%	7,879	41.13%	65	0.34%
1948	10,352	55.75%	8,217	44.25%	0	0.00%
1952	17,589	71.40%	7,047	28.60%	0	0.00%
1956	15,348	69.39%	6,769	30.61%	0	0.00%
1960	14,860	69.30%	6,582	30.70%	0	0.00%
1964	12,297	54.72%	10,175	45.28%	0	0.00%
1968	14,370	61.99%	5,802	25.03%	3,011	12.99%
1972	19,348	79.07%	4,557	18.62%	564	2.30%
1976	14,202	60.50%	8,969	38.21%	303	1.29%
1980	17,989	72.45%	5,718	23.03%	1,121	4.52%
1984	19,642	76.92%	5,730	22.44%	162	0.63%
1988	15,248	64.78%	8,067	34.27%	223	0.95%
1992	13,095	51.38%	6,720	26.37%	5,670	22.25%
1996	11,712	53.62%	7,504	34.36%	2,625	12.02%
2000	14,902	68.73%	6,543	30.18%	238	1.10%
2004	17,685	76.00%	5,586	24.00%	0	0.00%
2008	17,067	75.48%	5,545	24.52%	0	0.00%
2012	15,177	76.23%	4,733	23.77%	0	0.00%
2016	16,009	73.74%	4,397	20.25%	1,304	6.01%
2020	16,970	75.66%	4,919	21.93%	541	2.41%
2024	16,593	75.96%	4,849	22.20%	402	1.84%

Voter registration and party enrollment as of June 30, 2023
Party	Number of Voters	Percentage
Democratic	5,931	18.31%
Republican	20,301	62.66%
Others	6,165	19.03%
Total	32,397	100%

== Economy ==
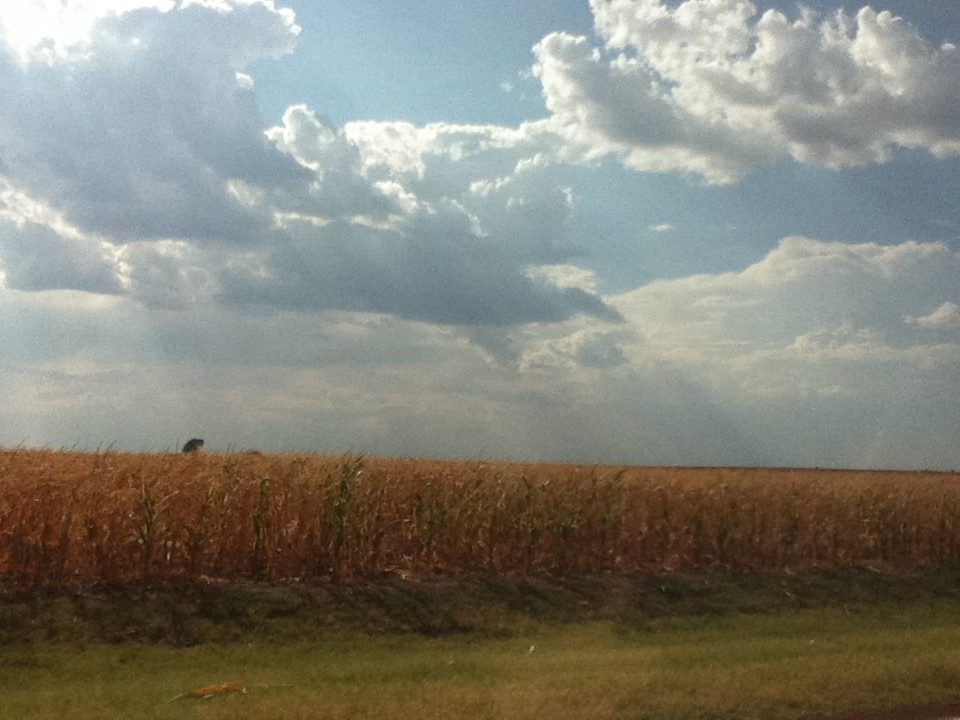
Wheat is a major part of the Garfield County economy. Its county seat, Enid, is named the Wheat Capital of Oklahoma.

Primary industries in Garfield County are agriculture and livestock. Historically, crops have included wheat, corn, oats, sorghum, Kaffir corn, and alfalfa. In addition, oil and gas and flour milling have proved fruitful for the county. The county seat of Enid, Oklahoma has the most grain storage capacity in the United States and one of the largest grain elevators in the world. Vance Air Force Base is also a major employer in the area of both airmen and civilians.

== Communities ==
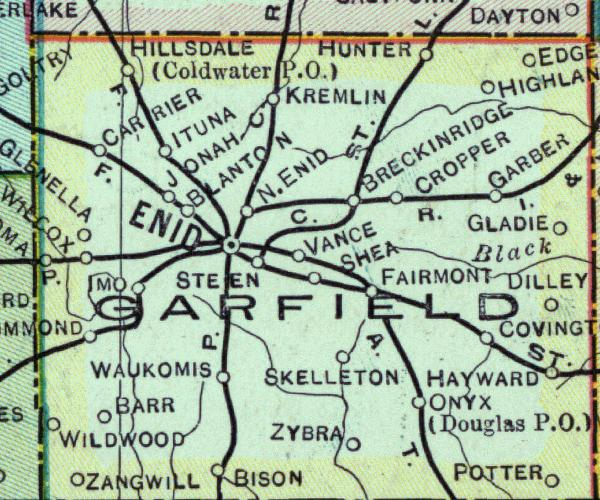
Early map of Garfield County.

=== Cities ===
- Enid (county seat)
- Garber

=== Towns ===
- Breckinridge
- Carrier
- Covington
- Douglas
- Drummond
- Fairmont
- Hillsdale
- Hunter
- Kremlin
- Lahoma
- North Enid
- Waukomis

=== Census-designated place ===
- Bison

=== Other unincorporated places ===
- Blanton
- Etna
- Hayward

== NRHP sites ==
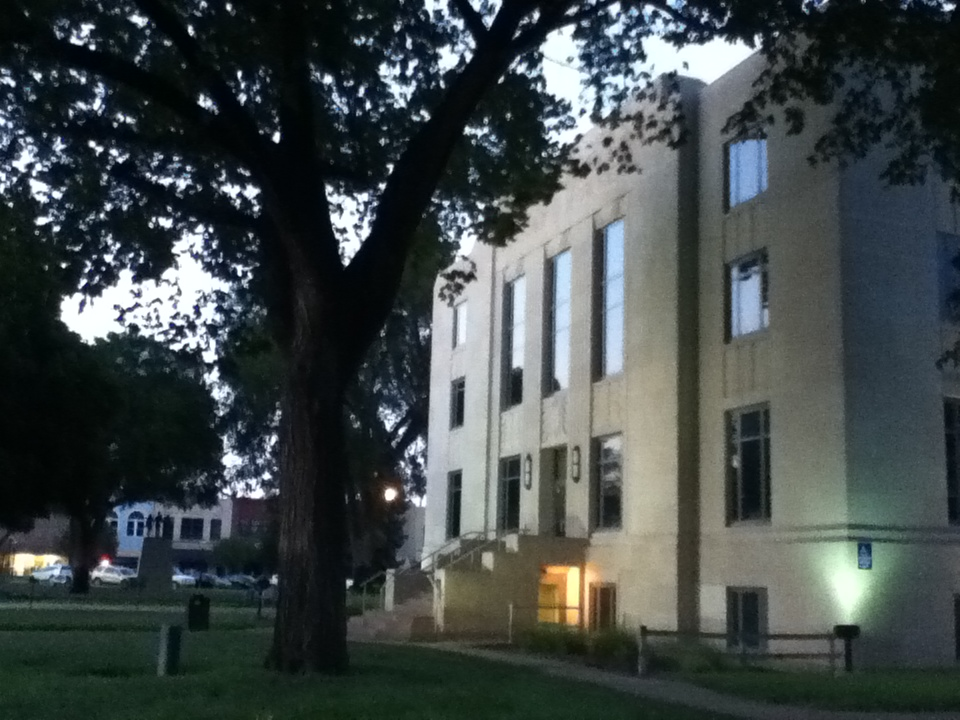
The Garfield County Courthouse, one of many Garfield County sites on the National Register of Historic Places, is located in downtown Enid, Oklahoma.

The county courthouse in 1908.

The following sites in Garfield County are listed on the National Register of Historic Places:

Covington

- Kimmell Barn
- R. E. Hoy No. 1 Oil Well

Enid

- Broadway Tower
- H. H. Champlin House
- T. T. Eason Mansion
- Enid Armory
- Enid Cemetery and Calvary Catholic Cemetery
- Enid Terminal Grain Elevators Historic District
- Enid Downtown Historic District
- Enid Masonic Temple
- Garfield County Courthouse
- Jackson School
- H. L. Kaufman House
- Kenwood Historic District
- Lamerton House
- McCristy-Knox Mansion
- Rock Island Depot
- Waverley Historic District

Hunter

- Bank of Hunter
