= Enid and Tonkawa Railway =

Enid and Tonkawa Railway Company
Overview
- Headquarters: Enid, Oklahoma
- Locale: Oklahoma
- Dates of operation: 1899–1899
- Successor: Chicago, Rock Island and Pacific Railroad

Technical
- Track gauge: 4 ft 8 1/2 in (1,435 mm) standard gauge
- Length: 26.7 mi (43.0 km)

The Enid and Tonkawa Railway was incorporated on July 20, 1899, under the laws of the Territory of Oklahoma. The company constructed a railroad line from North Enid, Oklahoma to Billings, Oklahoma, 26.7 miles, in that year. Passing through what would become the town of Breckinridge, Oklahoma, the line would in the future intersect the tracks of the Blackwell, Enid and Southwestern Railroad, built through that same location in the 1900-1901 timeframe.

The Chicago, Rock Island and Pacific Railroad purchased the company on December 22, 1899. Rock Island did not complete the line from Billings to Tonkawa, Oklahoma, 14.9 miles, until 1926, but promptly connected Tonkawa to Ponca City, another 11.4 miles, just a year later in 1927.

The entire line has subsequently been abandoned.
