= Jackson School (Enid, Oklahoma) =

- U.S. National Register of Historic Places
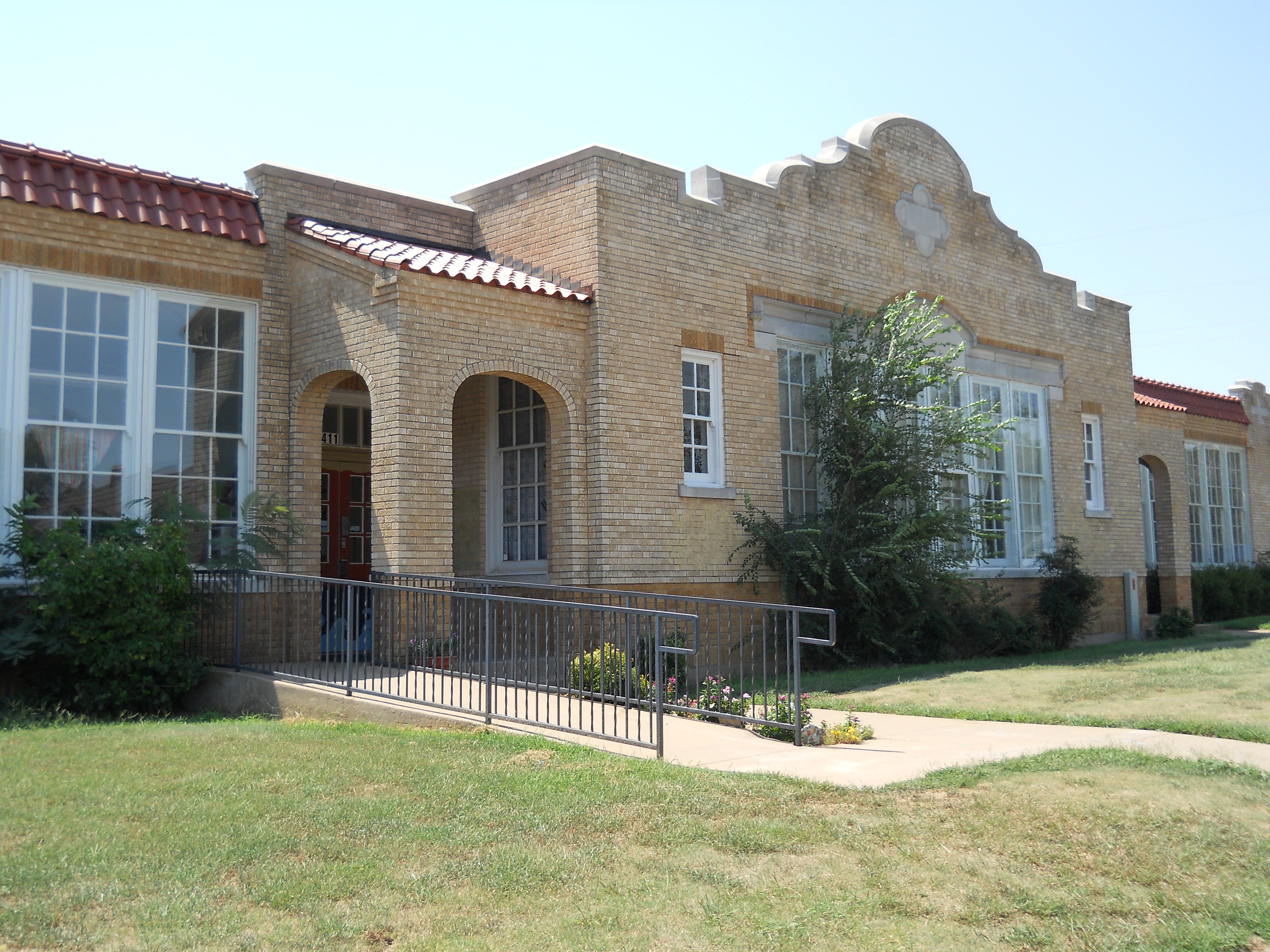

- Location within Oklahoma Location within the United States
- Location: 415 E. Illinois, Enid, Oklahoma
- Coordinates: 36°23′7″N 97°49′42″W
- Built: 1936
- Architect: R.W. Shaw
- Architectural style: Mission/Spanish Colonial Revival
- NRHP reference No.: 89000848
- Added to NRHP: 1989

Jackson School, built in 1936, is located in Enid, Garfield County, Oklahoma and listed on the National Register of Historic Places since 1989. It is one of three Mission/Spanish Colonial buildings in Enid. The other two are the 1928 Rock Island Depot, also listed on the register, and the Ehly house, constructed in 1929 for local J.C. Penney's manager, Gus Ehly. The building is constructed using buff brick and cast stone decorative molding. It has two arched entry ways with red tile shed roofs, a Greek cross in the upper middle section, and cement staircases. The building encompasses Block 16 of Enid's Southern Heights second addition. Its architect Roy Shaw also designed several other Enid school buildings including Enid High School, Adams, Garfield, Roosevelt, and Longfellow. Jackson school served as an all-white school until Enid's schools integrated in 1959. From 1967 to 1969, Jackson and neighboring George Washington Carver, formerly an all-black school, split grades 1-3 and 4–6, respectively, between the two schools, until both were closed in 1969.
