= Chisholm Public Schools =

School district in Oklahoma, United States

Coordinates: 36°26′13″N 97°52′09″W

Chisholm Public Schools (CPS)

Location
- 300 Colorado Avenue, Enid, OK 73703 Enid, Oklahoma

District information
- Type: Public
- Motto: Excellence.
- Grades: PK-12
- Superintendent: Marcus Chapman

Other information
- Website: information

Chisholm Public Schools is a public school district located in Enid, Oklahoma. District enrollment was approximately 900 students in the 2005–2006 school year. It consists of Chisholm Elementary School, Chisholm Middle School, and Chisholm High School.

== General information ==
=== Location and area ===
The district covers 87.22 square miles of land.

Within Garfield County and includes portions of northern Enid, all of Carrier, and North Enid. Additionally it has small sections of Alfalfa County and Major County, all unincorporated.

== School Board ==
The school board members are:

- President - Andrew Ewbank
- Vice President - Danielle Deterding
- Clerk - Geri Ayers
- Dustin Baylor
- Brendan Atkinson
