= Carrier, Oklahoma =

- Town
- Location in Garfield County and the state of Oklahoma
- Coordinates: 36°28′45″N 98°01′02″W
- Country: United States
- State: Oklahoma
- County: Garfield

Area
  - Total: 1.23 sq mi (3.18 km^{2})
  - Land: 1.23 sq mi (3.18 km^{2})
  - Water: 0 sq mi (0.00 km^{2})
- Elevation: 1,352 ft (412 m)

Population (2020)
  - Total: 90
  - Density: 73.3/sq mi (28.31/km^{2})
- Time zone: UTC-6 (Central (CST))
  - Summer (DST): UTC-5 (CDT)
- ZIP code: 73727
- Area code: 580
- FIPS code: 40-12200
- GNIS feature ID: 2413173

Carrier is a town in Garfield County, Oklahoma, United States. As of the 2020 census, Carrier had a population of 90.

== History ==
The area around Carrier was first settled by farmers who moved there following the opening of the Cherokee Outlet in 1893. The origin of the name "Carrier" comes from the first postmaster, Solomon Carrier. Buildings were constructed to serve area farmers, including businesses, a school, and a Congregational church. In 1903, the Northwestern Townsite Company as the Arkansas Valley and Western Railway, which was planning to build a railway through the area, laid out a town site around a mile from the existing site, and the businesses relocated to the new location. In 1904, the railway was finished. The town's economy was primarily based on agriculture and the petroleum industry. The town was not incorporated until 1972. In the 21st century, many of the people who live in Carrier commute to work in Enid.

== Geography ==
Carrier is located in northwestern Garfield County. Oklahoma State Highway 45 runs through the center of town, leading east 9 miles (14 km) to the outskirts of North Enid and west and north 11 miles (18 km) to Goltry. Oklahoma State Highway 132 passes through the eastern part of Carrier, leading north 15 miles (24 km) to Nash and south 6 miles (10 km) to U.S. Route 412 at a point 7.5 miles (12.1 km) west of downtown Enid.

According to the United States Census Bureau, Carrier has a total area of 1.2 square miles (3.2 km^{2}), all land.

== Demographics ==
Historical population
Census	Pop.	Note	%±
1980	259		—
1990	171		−34.0%
2000	77		−55.0%
2010	85		10.4%
2020	90		5.9%

=== 2020 census ===
As of the 2020 census, Carrier had a population of 90. The median age was 54.5 years. 17.8% of residents were under the age of 18 and 26.7% of residents were 65 years of age or older. For every 100 females there were 95.7 males, and for every 100 females age 18 and over there were 100.0 males age 18 and over.

0.0% of residents lived in urban areas, while 100.0% lived in rural areas.

There were 38 households in Carrier, of which 31.6% had children under the age of 18 living in them. Of all households, 65.8% were married-couple households, 18.4% were households with a male householder and no spouse or partner present, and 10.5% were households with a female householder and no spouse or partner present. About 10.5% of all households were made up of individuals and 2.6% had someone living alone who was 65 years of age or older.

There were 38 housing units, of which 0.0% were vacant. The homeowner vacancy rate was 0.0% and the rental vacancy rate was 0.0%.

Racial composition as of the 2020 census
Race	Number	Percent
White	82	91.1%
Black or African American	0	0.0%
American Indian and Alaska Native	2	2.2%
Asian	0	0.0%
Native Hawaiian and Other Pacific Islander	0	0.0%
Some other race	3	3.3%
Two or more races	3	3.3%
Hispanic or Latino (of any race)	10	11.1%

=== 2000 census ===
As of the 2000 census, there were 77 people, 27 households, and 24 families residing in the town. The population density was 63.3 inhabitants per square mile (24.4/km^{2}). There were 30 housing units at an average density of 24.7 per square mile (9.5/km^{2}). The racial makeup of the town was 97.40% White and 2.60% Pacific Islander.

There were 27 households, out of which 37.0% had children under the age of 18 living with them, 66.7% were married couples living together, 14.8% had a female householder with no husband present, and 11.1% were non-families. 7.4% of all households were made up of individuals, and 3.7% had someone living alone who was 65 years of age or older. The average household size was 2.85 and the average family size was 3.04.

In the town, the population was spread out, with 29.9% under the age of 18, 3.9% from 18 to 24, 26.0% from 25 to 44, 32.5% from 45 to 64, and 7.8% who were 65 years of age or older. The median age was 41 years. For every 100 females, there were 87.8 males. For every 100 females age 18 and over, there were 107.7 males.

The median income for a household in the town was $40,250, and the median income for a family was $40,000. Males had a median income of $32,031 versus $16,875 for females. The per capita income for the town was $16,731. None of the population and none of the families were below the poverty line.

== Education ==
It is zoned to Chisholm Public Schools.
