= Enid station =

Railway station in Garfield County, Oklahoma

Enid
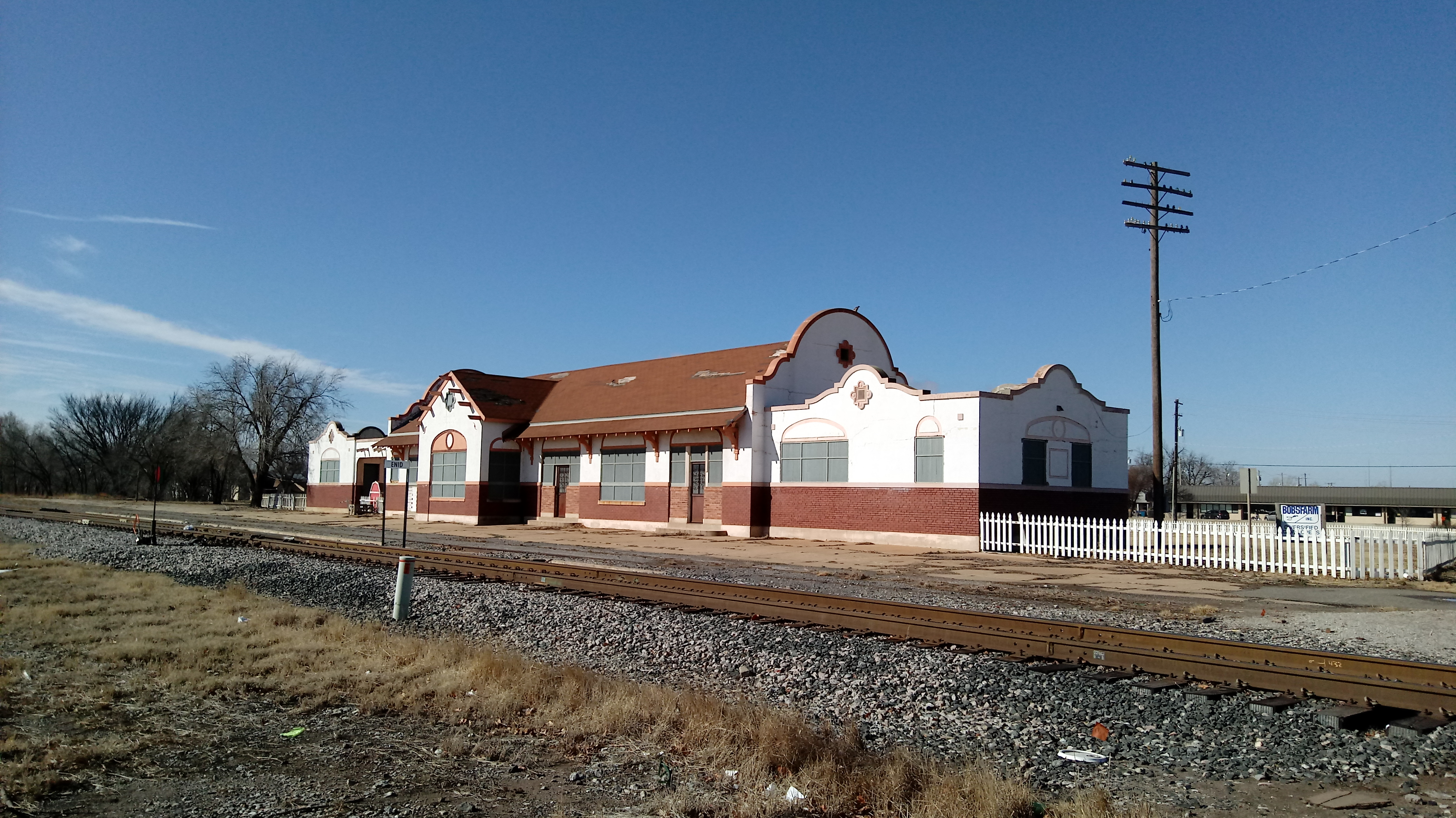
- The depot, seen here on February 17, 2018

General information
- Location: 109 East Owen K. Garriott Road, Enid, Oklahoma 73701
- System: Former Rock Island Line passenger station
- Platforms: 1

History
- Opened: 1889
- Rebuilt: 1903; 1928

Services
Preceding station	Chicago, Rock Island and Pacific Railroad	Following station
Waukomis toward Teague	Teague – Minneapolis	Kremlin toward Minneapolis
Lahoma toward Geary	Geary – Enid	Terminus
- Rock Island Depot
- U.S. National Register of Historic Places
- Location within Oklahoma Location within the United States
- Location: 109 Owen K. Garriott Road, Enid, Oklahoma
- Coordinates: 36°23′25″N 97°52′37″W
- Built: 1928
- Architectural style: Mission/Spanish Colonial Revival
- NRHP reference No.: 79003639
- Added to NRHP: 1979
Location

The Rock Island Depot is located in Enid, Garfield County, Oklahoma and listed on the National Register of Historic Places since 1979.

== History ==
The Rock Island Railway built rail lines through Oklahoma Territory prior to the Land Run of 1893. Skeleton Station was constructed in 1889. That same year, M.A. Low, upon a visit to the station, renamed the location Enid. When the Department of Interior moved the town site, this area became known as North Enid or Northington. During the run, the Rock Island transported settlers into the Cherokee Outlet, stopping only at this location. Rock Island refused to stop at the new town site, and the Enid-Pond Creek Railroad War continued for a full year. A new depot was built in 1903. The current depot was constructed in 1928.

== Building description ==
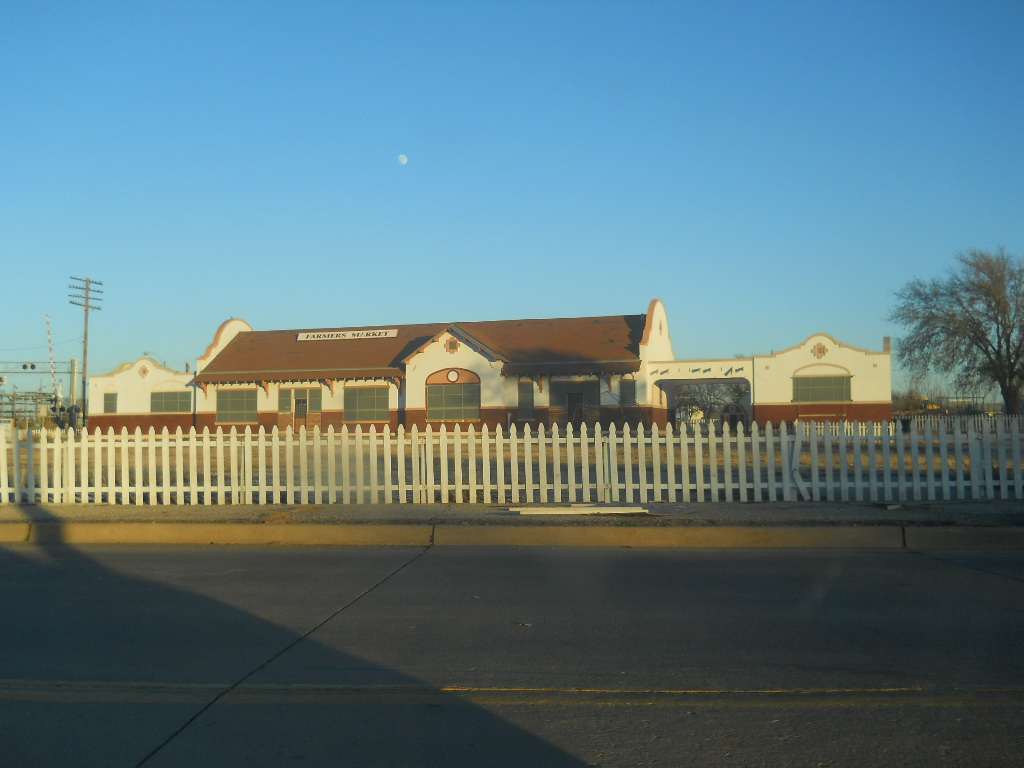
Rock Island Train depot is seen across the street in Enid, Oklahoma

The building is 195 feet (59 m) long and 26 feet (7.9 m) wide. The building architecture is electric, showing both Spanish and Italian influences. The lower section of the exterior wall is brick, while there is covered with stucco. The stucco is painted white, decorated with tan painted trim. The center section has a gabled roof, with semicircular walls extending above the roof line on each end. The large window in the center is arched. Other windows have an arch design embedded in the stucco.

The building is single story and has 8 large rooms, for baggage handling, ticketing, waiting, and a covered concourse. Seven smaller rooms were for men's and women's restrooms and for storage. Since Oklahoma law required strict segregation of black and white passengers, there had to be two for each function.

The station is not now used by the railroad. It was used as a farmer's market on Saturdays during 2011.
