= Douglas, Oklahoma =

- Town
- Location in Garfield County and the state of Oklahoma
- Coordinates: 36°15′38″N 97°40′00″W
- Country: United States
- State: Oklahoma
- County: Garfield

Area
  - Total: 0.25 sq mi (0.66 km^{2})
  - Land: 0.25 sq mi (0.66 km^{2})
  - Water: 0 sq mi (0.00 km^{2})
- Elevation: 1,132 ft (345 m)

Population (2020)
  - Total: 51
  - Density: 200.8/sq mi (77.52/km^{2})
- Time zone: UTC-6 (Central (CST))
  - Summer (DST): UTC-5 (CDT)
- ZIP code: 73733
- Area code: 580
- FIPS code: 40-21250
- GNIS feature ID: 2412444

Douglas is a town in Garfield County, Oklahoma, United States. As of the 2020 census, Douglas had a population of 51.

== Geography ==
Douglas is located in southeastern Garfield County. It is 21 miles (34 km) southeast of Enid, the county seat, and 64 miles (103 km) north of Oklahoma City.

According to the United States Census Bureau, the town has a total area of 0.2 square miles (0.4 km^{2}), all land.

=== Climate ===
Climate data for Douglas, Oklahoma
Month	Jan	Feb	Mar	Apr	May	Jun	Jul	Aug	Sep	Oct	Nov	Dec	Year
Record high °F (°C)	84 (29)	92 (33)	100 (38)	96 (36)	102 (39)	110 (43)	115 (46)	118 (48)	109 (43)	100 (38)	92 (33)	85 (29)	118 (48)
Mean daily maximum °F (°C)	48 (9)	52 (11)	62 (17)	72 (22)	80 (27)	90 (32)	95 (35)	95 (35)	87 (31)	75 (24)	61 (16)	50 (10)	72 (22)
Mean daily minimum °F (°C)	25 (−4)	28 (−2)	37 (3)	47 (8)	56 (13)	66 (19)	70 (21)	69 (21)	61 (16)	50 (10)	37 (3)	28 (−2)	48 (9)
Record low °F (°C)	−14 (−26)	−20 (−29)	18 (−8)	28 (−2)	43 (6)	50 (10)	45 (7)	35 (2)	17 (−8)	9 (−13)	−4 (−20)	—	−20 (−29)
Average precipitation inches (mm)	1.1 (28)	1.2 (30)	1.6 (41)	3.1 (79)	4.3 (110)	4 (100)	2.7 (69)	3.4 (86)	3.1 (79)	2.6 (66)	1.5 (38)	1.2 (30)	29.8 (760)
Average snowfall inches (cm)	3.7 (9.4)	3.3 (8.4)	1.7 (4.3)	0.6 (1.5)	1.1 (2.8)	—	—	—	—	—	—	—	10.4 (26)
Average rainy days	2.9	3.1	4	6.2	6.9	6.8	5.2	6.1	5.1	4.5	3	3.2	57
Average relative humidity (%)	69	69	63	62	68	64	61	60	58	61	63	66	64
Source 1: weather.com
Source 2: Weatherbase.com

== Demographics ==
Historical population
Census	Pop.	Note	%±
1910	132		—
1920	195		47.7%
1930	163		−16.4%
1940	140		−14.1%
1950	114		−18.6%
1960	74		−35.1%
1970	79		6.8%
1980	89		12.7%
1990	55		−38.2%
2000	32		−41.8%
2010	32		0.0%
2020	51		59.4%

=== 2020 census ===
As of the 2020 census, Douglas had a population of 51. The median age was 29.5 years. 35.3% of residents were under the age of 18 and 3.9% of residents were 65 years of age or older. For every 100 females there were 96.2 males, and for every 100 females age 18 and over there were 106.2 males age 18 and over.

0.0% of residents lived in urban areas, while 100.0% lived in rural areas.

There were 15 households in Douglas, of which 66.7% had children under the age of 18 living in them. Of all households, 53.3% were married-couple households, 13.3% were households with a male householder and no spouse or partner present, and 20.0% were households with a female householder and no spouse or partner present. About 13.3% of all households were made up of individuals and 6.7% had someone living alone who was 65 years of age or older.

There were 23 housing units, of which 34.8% were vacant. The homeowner vacancy rate was 7.1% and the rental vacancy rate was 50.0%.

Racial composition as of the 2020 census
Race	Number	Percent
White	42	82.4%
Black or African American	1	2.0%
American Indian and Alaska Native	0	0.0%
Asian	2	3.9%
Native Hawaiian and Other Pacific Islander	0	0.0%
Some other race	1	2.0%
Two or more races	5	9.8%
Hispanic or Latino (of any race)	6	11.8%

=== 2000 census ===
As of the 2000 census, there were 32 people, 13 households, and 8 families residing in the town. The population density was 212.2 inhabitants per square mile (81.9/km^{2}). There were 22 housing units at an average density of 145.9 per square mile (56.3/km^{2}). The racial makeup of the town was 100.00% White.

There were 13 households, out of which 46.2% had children under the age of 18 living with them, 53.8% were married couples living together, 7.7% had a female householder with no husband present, and 30.8% were non-families. 15.4% of all households were made up of individuals, and none had someone living alone who was 65 years of age or older. The average household size was 2.46 and the average family size was 2.89.

In the town, the population was spread out, with 28.1% under the age of 18, 6.3% from 18 to 24, 28.1% from 25 to 44, 28.1% from 45 to 64, and 9.4% who were 65 years of age or older. The median age was 38 years. For every 100 females, there were 100.0 males. For every 100 females age 18 and over, there were 91.7 males.

The median income for a household in the town was $19,167, and the median income for a family was $20,000. Males had a median income of $20,625 versus $20,000 for females. The per capita income for the town was $11,141. There were 25.0% of families and 16.2% of the population living below the poverty line, including 37.5% of under eighteens and none of those over 64.

== Education ==
Its school district is Covington-Douglas Schools.
