= Etna, Oklahoma =

Unincorporated community in Oklahoma, US

Coordinates: 36°22′14″N 97°44′48″W

Etna is an unincorporated community in Garfield County, Oklahoma, United States. Etna is east-southeast of Enid, off U.S. 412 and south on County 950. It lies at an elevation of 1184 feet (361 m).
