= Blanton, Oklahoma =

- Unincorporated community
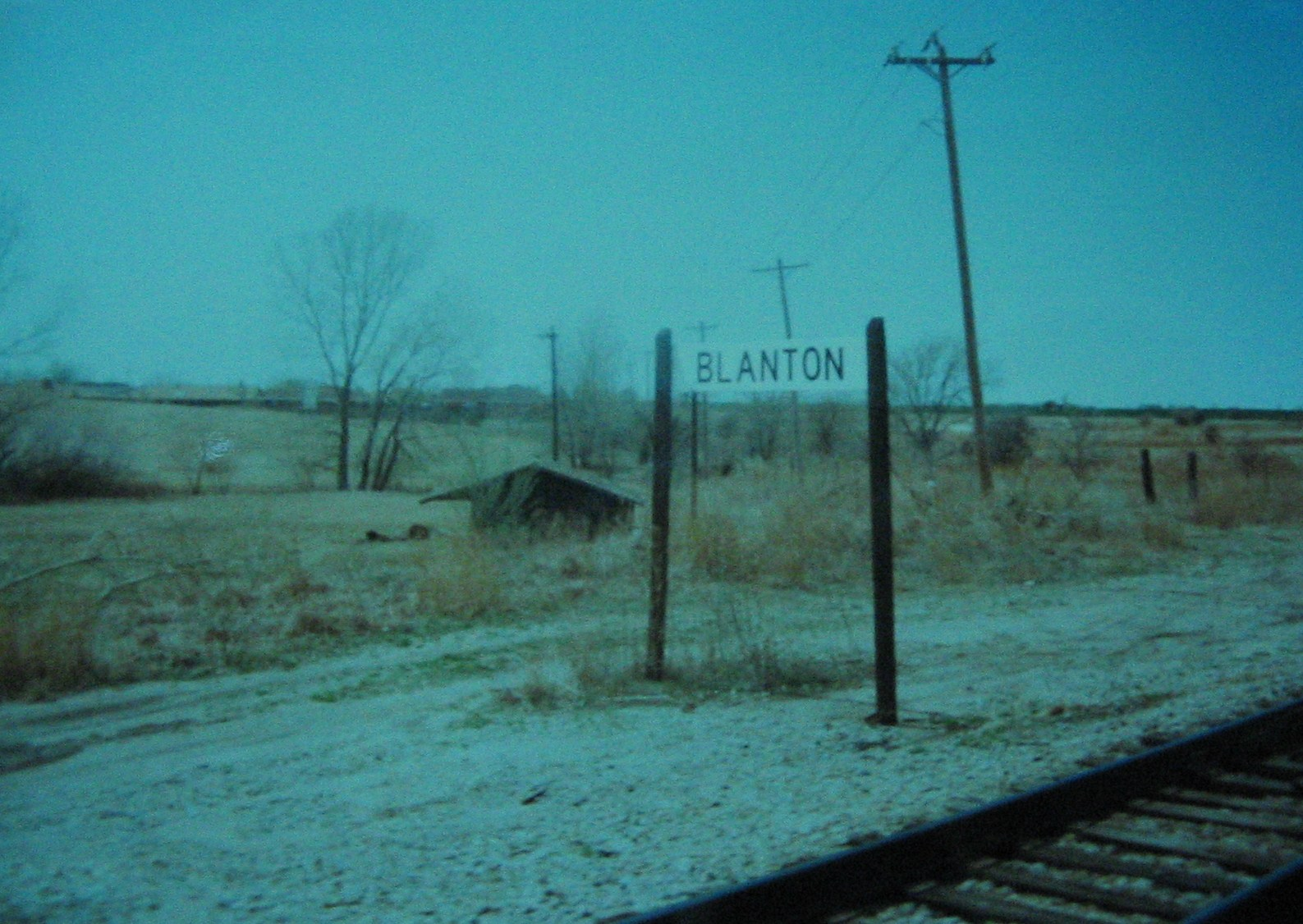
- Blanton railroad stop in the mid-1990s

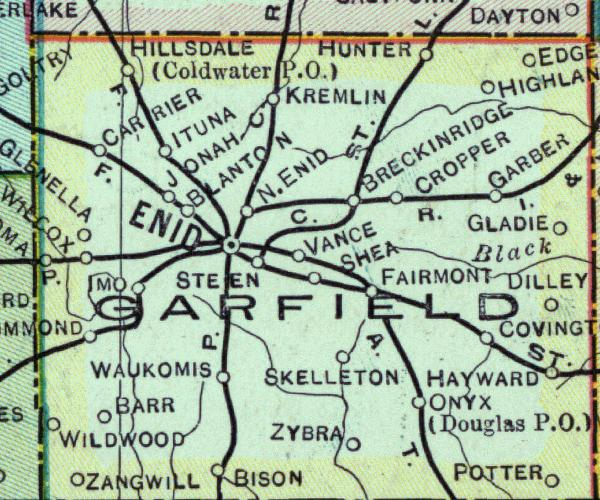
- 1909 map of Garfield County, Oklahoma with Blanton.
- Coordinates: 36°25′38″N 97°55′35″W
- Country: United States
- State: Oklahoma
- County: Garfield
- Elevation: 1,300 ft (400 m)
- Time zone: UTC-6 (CST)
  - Summer (DST): UTC-5 (CDT)
- Area code: 580
- GNIS feature ID: 1100216

Blanton is an unincorporated community in Garfield County, Oklahoma, United States. It was a rail stop for two rail lines, one of which used to transport grain until the mid-1990s. It was named after Denver, Enid and Gulf Railroad (DE&G) executive W. B. Blanton.

== History ==
As early as 1909, Blanton was a rail stop for the St. Louis-San Francisco Railway.

A second rail line existed at Blanton, running to Kiowa, Kansas. This line, originally built for the DE&G in 1904 and 1905 and later sold to the Atchison, Topeka and Santa Fe, was used to transport grain until the mid-1990s. An entity called the K & E Railway Company (K&E) acquired the then-unused Blanton to Kiowa branch from the Santa Fe in 1996; but, finding no interest in area grain companies to reactivate the line rather than continuing truck shipments to Enid, the K&E applied for and was granted permission later in the year to abandon the line.

== Geography ==
Blanton is located at 36°25′38″N 97°55′35″W, 3.4 miles (5.5 km) west-northwest of Enid. It is a part of the Lower Cimarron-Skeleton Watershed.

Blanton is currently located on mile 548.2 of the main track of BNSF Railway's Texas Division.
