= Enid Terminal Grain Elevators Historic District =

Historic district in Oklahoma, United States

- U.S. National Register of Historic Places
- U.S. Historic district
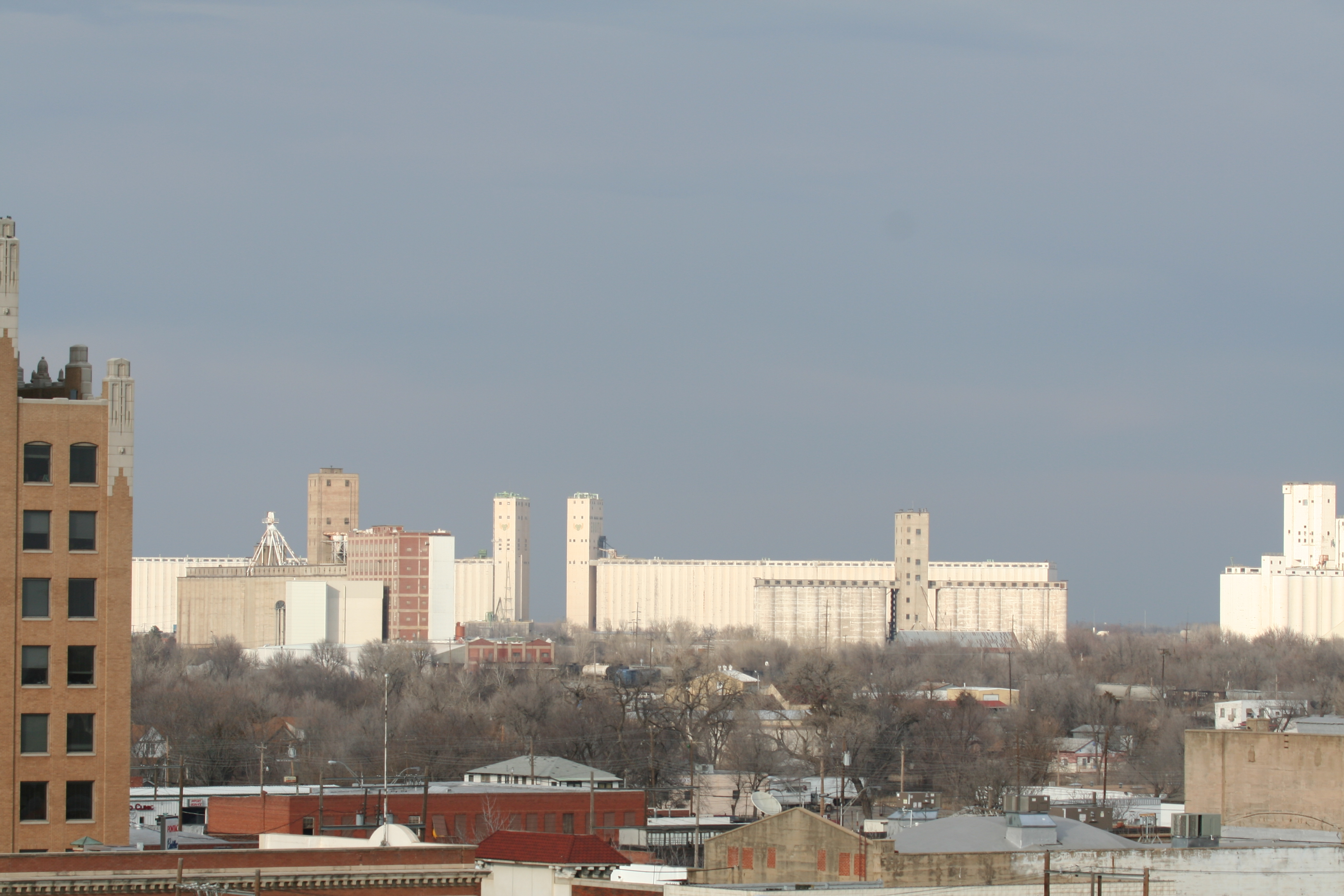
- Location: North 10th, North 16th, North Van Buren, and Willow Streets, Enid, Oklahoma
- Coordinates: 36.42365°N 97.85851°W
- Built: 1925-1954
- Architectural style: Terminal Grain Elevators
- NRHP reference No.: 09000239
- Added to NRHP: 2009

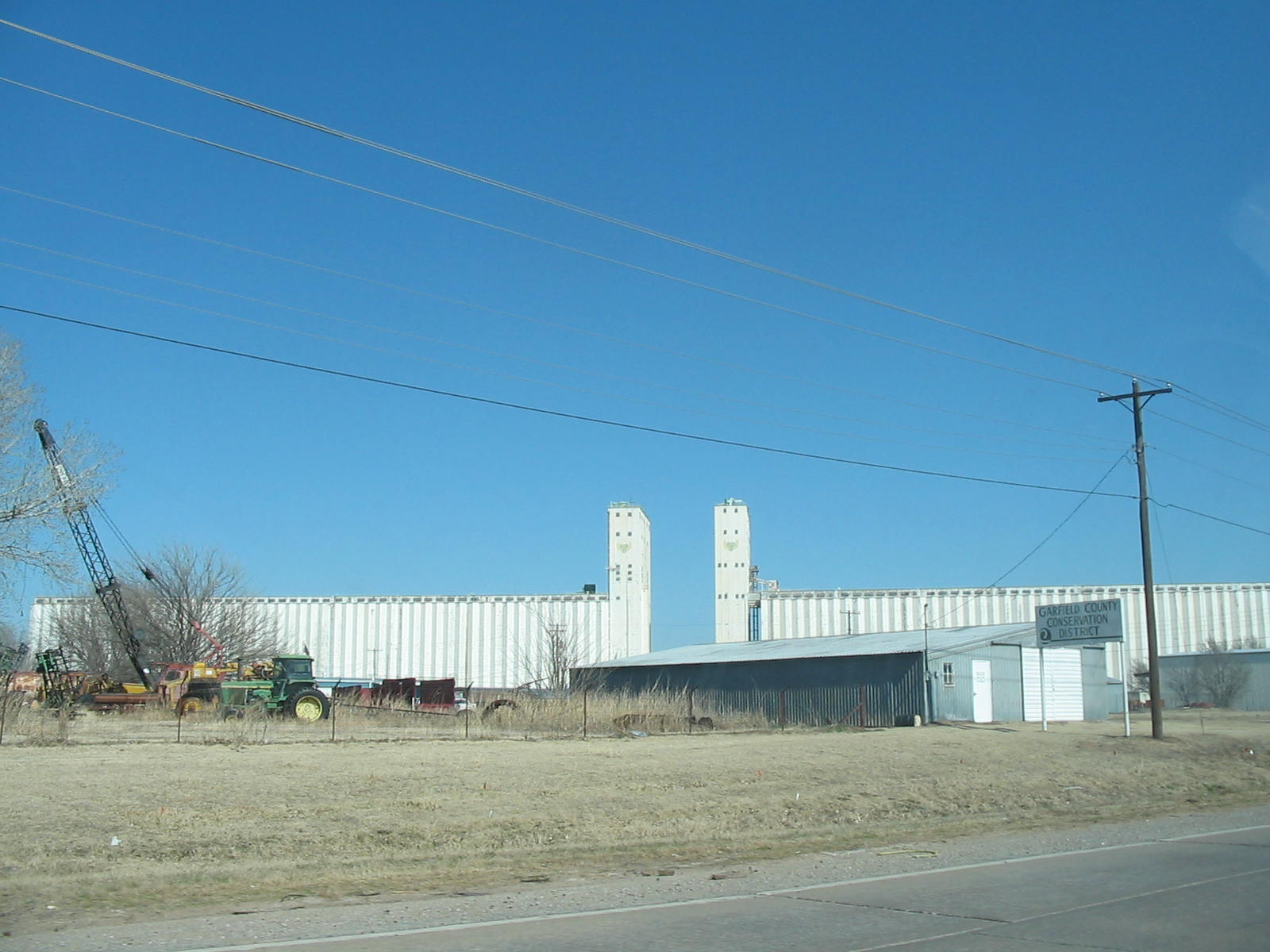

The Enid Terminal Grain Elevators Historic District is located in Enid, Garfield County, Oklahoma and listed on the National Register of Historic Places since 2009. The district consists of concrete grain elevators located between North 10th, North 16th, North Van Buren, and Willow Streets which have dotted the Enid skyline since the 1920s.

== History ==
In 1938, during the Great Depression, Enid set a record of 14,185 train loads of wheat. By April 1939, Enid was claiming the title of "Oklahoma’s Queen Wheat City." By 1962, Garfield County's storage capacity was 75 million bushels, becoming the state of Oklahoma's main grain storage and handling center. By 1970, the city claimed the title of Wheat Capital of the United States of America.

The need for grain transportation has led to the continued improvement of Enid's infrastructure. In addition to being a grain storage hub, Enid was a rail hub for the Cherokee Outlet. The first elevator built in Enid, the Enid Terminal Elevator, is located next to the Van Buren overpass next to Enid's main rail hub, five of the elevators are on the St. Louis and San Francisco Railroad tracks or connecting lines in the north part of town, and U.S. Highway 64 runs in an east–west direction just to the south of Elevators Y and Z.

Enid hit its peak with a total grain storage capacity of 80,000,000 bushels in 1987. The 1980 grain embargo instated by President Jimmy Carter, a poor economy, and drought lead to the closure of several of the elevators. In 1989, the Union Equity Co-Operative Exchange Elevators A and B and the Oklahoma Wheat Pool Terminal Elevator were shut down. Enid continues to have the largest grain storage capacity in the United States and the third largest in the world.

== List of Grain Elevators ==
Name	Year built	Location	Architect	Capacity (million bushels)	Notes
Pillsbury Milling Elevator	1928	515 E. Birch		2.5	
Enid Terminal Elevator	1925	1015 North Van Buren Street	Jones-Hettelsater Construction Company of Kansas City, Missouri	2	
Southwest Terminal Elevator	1926	1700 N. 10th Street		1	Also known as Feuquay and Salina Terminal Elevator.
General Mills Elevator	1929	1702 North 10th Street		2	
Oklahoma Wheat Pool Terminal Elevator	1930, 1935	1801 North 16th Street	Jones-Hettelsater Construction Company of Kansas City, Missouri	2.1	Also called the Farmers’ National Grain Corporation Elevator and Continental Grain Company Elevator.
Union Equity Co-Operative Exchange Elevator A	1931	1801 N. 10th Street		7.6	
Union Equity Co-Operative Exchange Elevator B	1946	1801 N. 10th Street	Chalmers and Borton Construction Company of Hutchinson, Kansas	11	This elevator was the first to be designed in the shape of a hexagon, which maximized storage space. E.N. Puckett, Union Equity general manager, received inspiration from a hotel's bathroom tile design.
Union Equity Co-Operative Exchange Elevator Z	1949–1951		Chalmers and Borton Construction Company of Hutchinson, Kansas	15.3	
Union Equity Co-Operative Exchange Elevator Y	1953–1954			16.3	In 1956 this was the largest conventional grain elevator in the world at the time of construction.
