= Denver, Enid and Gulf Railroad =

American short line railroad

Overview
- Locale: Kansas, Oklahoma
- Dates of operation: 1902–1907
- Successor: Atchison, Topeka and Santa Fe Railway

Technical
- Track gauge: 4 ft 8 1/2 in (1,435 mm) standard gauge

The Denver, Enid and Gulf Railroad (DE&G) was built as a short line railroad operating in Kansas, and Oklahoma. Incorporated in Oklahoma as the Denver, Enid and Gulf Railroad Company, March 31, 1902, by the five Frantz Brothers.

== History ==
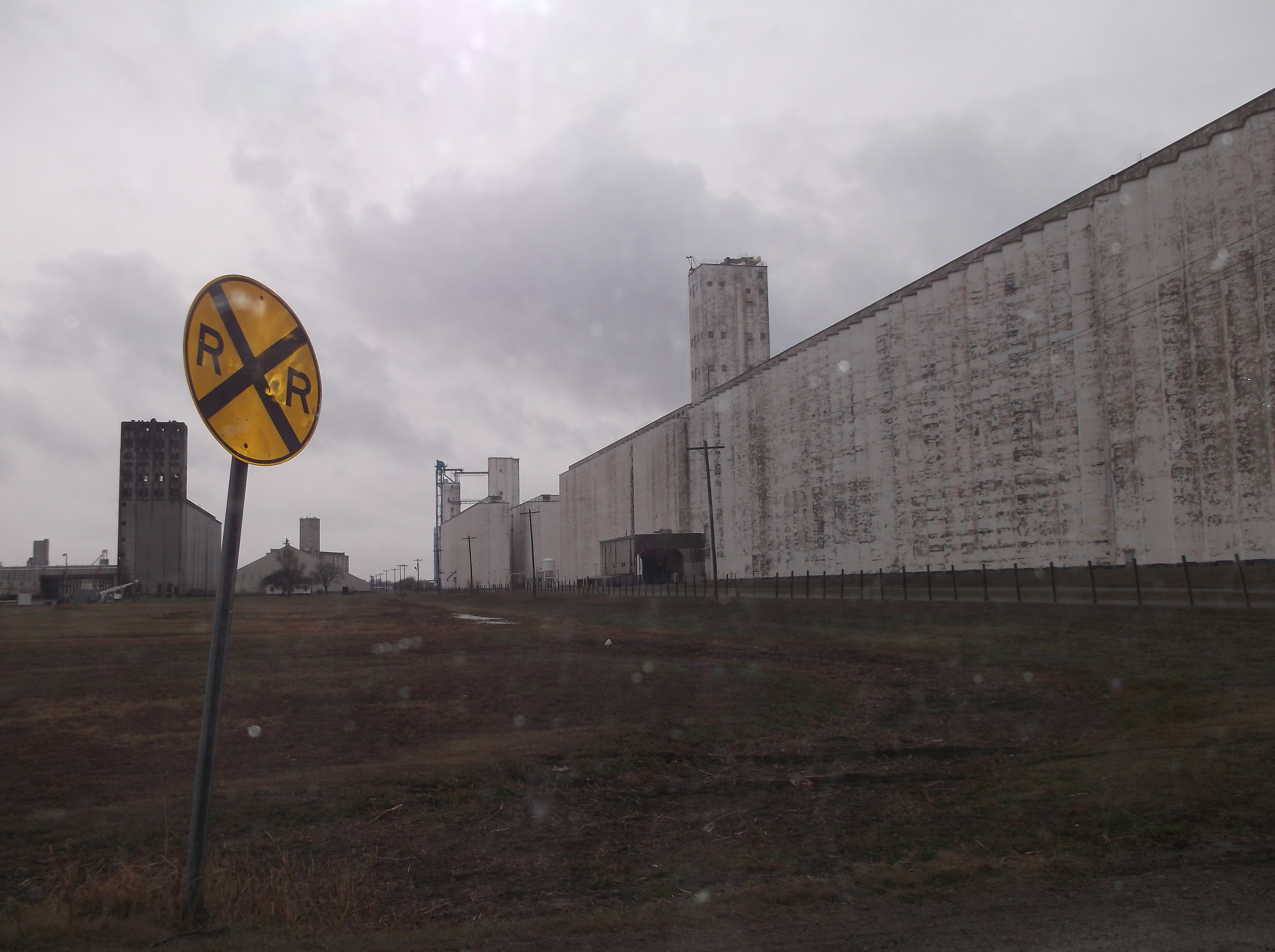
Grain elevator by railroad in Enid, Oklahoma

In June 1902, construction started with grading at Enid, Oklahoma. Track laying began at Enid, reaching Guthrie, Oklahoma, on July 3, 1904. The first passenger train was an excursion train run from Enid to Guthrie on July 4, 1904. 1905 marked completion of the line northward from Enid to Kiowa, Kansas. The line from Guthrie to Kiowa was 117.10 miles (188.45 km). The Denver, Enid and Gulf Railroad never reached its expressed terminals. When the Santa Fe acquired it, the line became a connecting link between its south bound Texas line at Guthrie, and its west bound California, Kansas, line at Kiowa.

On May 22, 1907, the Denver, Enid and Gulf Railroad was sold to the Eastern Oklahoma Railway. Soon thereafter, on June 20, 1907, it was resold to the Atchison, Topeka and Santa Fe Railway.

== Geography ==
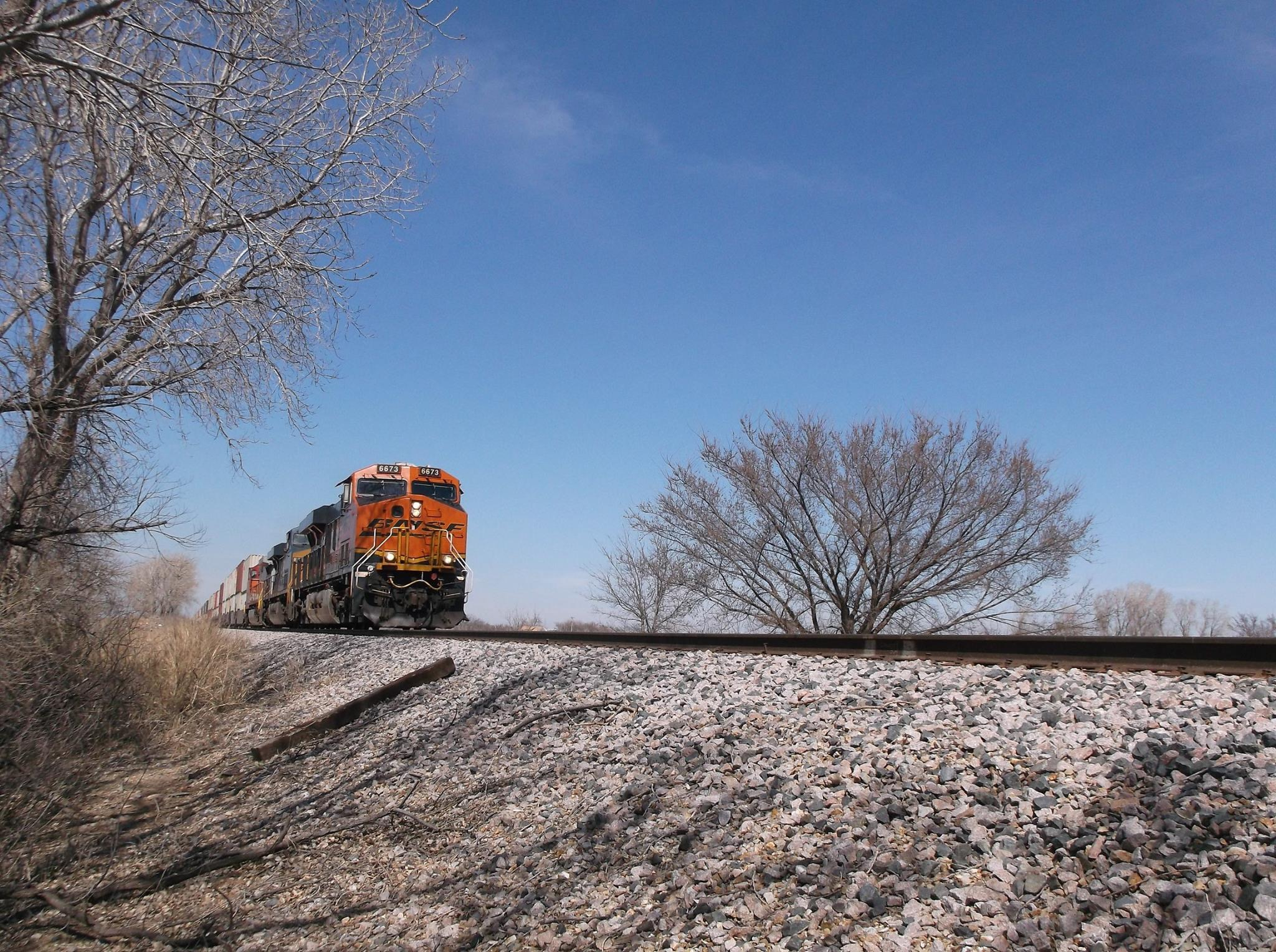
A train on the tracks near Blanton, Oklahoma

Starting at the south end of the line in Guthrie, Oklahoma, the DE&G departed from the AT&SF mainline just north of downtown and curved northwestward, paralleling, then crossing the sand-choked Cimarron River on a long wooden pile bridge. The line continued northwestward through several small farming communities, servicing grain elevators. A high wooden trestle carried the railroad across Skeleton Creek. At Enid, Oklahoma, the line crossed the former Chicago, Rock Island and Pacific Railroad (now Union Pacific Railroad) as well as two lines of the St. Louis-San Francisco Railway. In Enid the former AT&SF brick freight depot houses the Railroad Museum of Oklahoma, across the street from the classic Tudor AT&SF passenger station. Between Jet and Cherokee, Oklahoma, the line crossed the western portion of the salt flats at Great Salt Plains Lake for several miles atop an earth berm fill. North of Cherokee it bridged the Salt Fork of the Arkansas River, including a long wooden trestle over the flood plain. At Kiowa, Kansas, the line terminated at a junction with the current BNSF Railway transcontinental line after passing through a cut about 10-foot (3.0 m) deep.

== Passenger Service ==
In March 1949, Northbound train number 54 left Guthrie at 8:15 a.m. Central Time, arrived in Enid at 9:55 a.m., and terminated in Kiowa at 11:55 a.m. Southbound train number 53 departed Kiowa at 12:30 p.m., arrived in Enid at 2:30 p.m., and terminated in Guthrie at 4:20 p.m.

== Abandonments ==
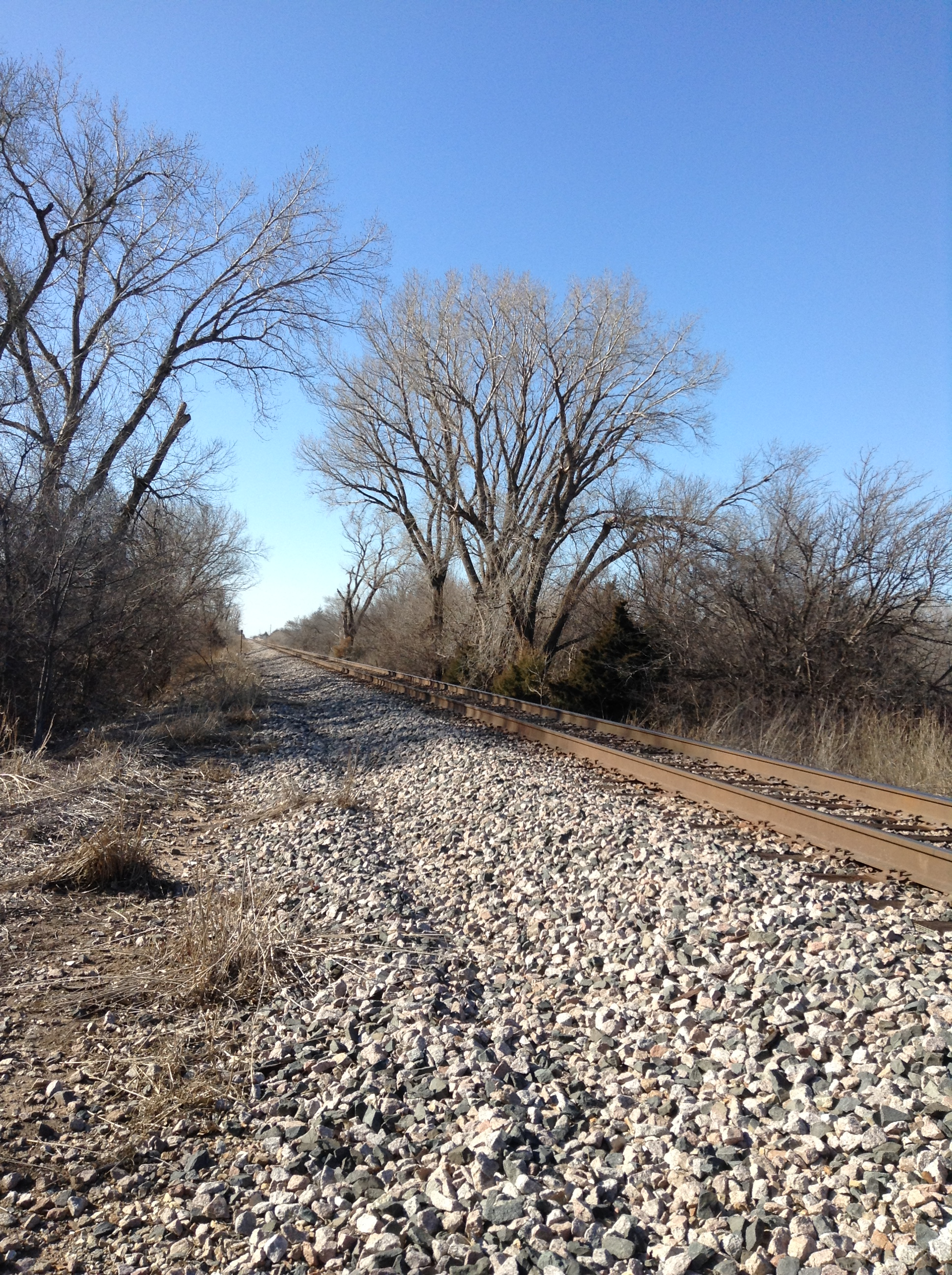
Train tracks at Blanton, Oklahoma

Blanton, Oklahoma, to Kiowa, Kansas - 1996 (57.69 miles or 92.84 kilometres)
On December 23, 1996, the Surface Transportation Board approved the K & E Railway (K&E) request to abandon its entire 57.69-mile rail line between milepost 0.60, at or near Kiowa, Kansas, and milepost 56.98, at or near Blanton, Garfield County, northwest of Enid, Oklahoma. K&E acquired the line from The Atchison, Topeka and Santa Fe Railway Company earlier in 1996. Historically, the line was used for grain gathering, but no traffic had moved over it for at least 5 years prior to the acquisition by K&E, and K&E had subsequently moved no traffic. According to K&E, the track primarily consisted of 90-lb. rail installed between 1914 and 1921. The track was described as generally in fair to poor condition, requiring replacement of approximately 14% of the rail, 7% of the bars, and 46% of the ties to resume service. In addition, several wash-outs and four bridges are said to have required repairs.

Guthrie, Oklahoma, to Fairmont, Oklahoma - 1998 (42.8 miles or 68.9 kilometres)
This section was taken out of service in 1994 due to flood damage on the Cimarron River bridge and a couple of other creeks near the bridge. Although the blame for this abandonment is given due to a bridge washout at Cottonwood Creek it is more than likely due to the merger of the Burlington Northern Railroad and Atchison, Topeka and Santa Fe Railway. Trains from Enid now run on the Avard sub to Perry, Oklahoma and then "west" to Guthrie. On October 23, 1998, the Surface Transportation Board approved the BNSF Railway request to abandon 42.80 miles of its line of railroad between milepost 73.60 near Fairmont and milepost 116.40 near Guthrie The line was railbanked, and the Oklahoma Department of Transportation was designated as the holder of rights to develop it for trail use. On Feb 19, 2010, a petition was filed by Montoff Transportation, LLC, of Seattle WA, to acquire from BNSF its residual right to reactivate the line and from ODOT its right to develop a trail. The stated purpose at that time was to put the line back in service, and initially to develop portions of it for railcar storage.

== Current operations ==
Enid to Fairmont, Oklahoma, is operated by BNSF Railway for directional running, in tandem with a parallel line which was formerly part of the Frisco (St. Louis-San Francisco Railway). This is now part of BNSF Railway Avard sub, used for transcontinental traffic.
