= Slaty Creek =

- Town
- Coordinates: 36°32′22″S 143°17′41″E
- Country: Australia
- State: Victoria
- LGAs: Shire of Northern Grampians; Shire of Loddon

Government
  - State electorate: Ripon
  - Federal division: Mallee

Population
  - Total: 34 (2021 census)
- Postcode: 3477

Slaty Creek is a locality in the Shire of Loddon and the Shire of Northern Grampians, Victoria, Australia. At the 2021 census, Slaty Creek had a population of 34.

== History ==
Slaty Creek is located on the lands of the Dja Dja Wurrung people.
