= Enid Armory =

- U.S. National Register of Historic Places
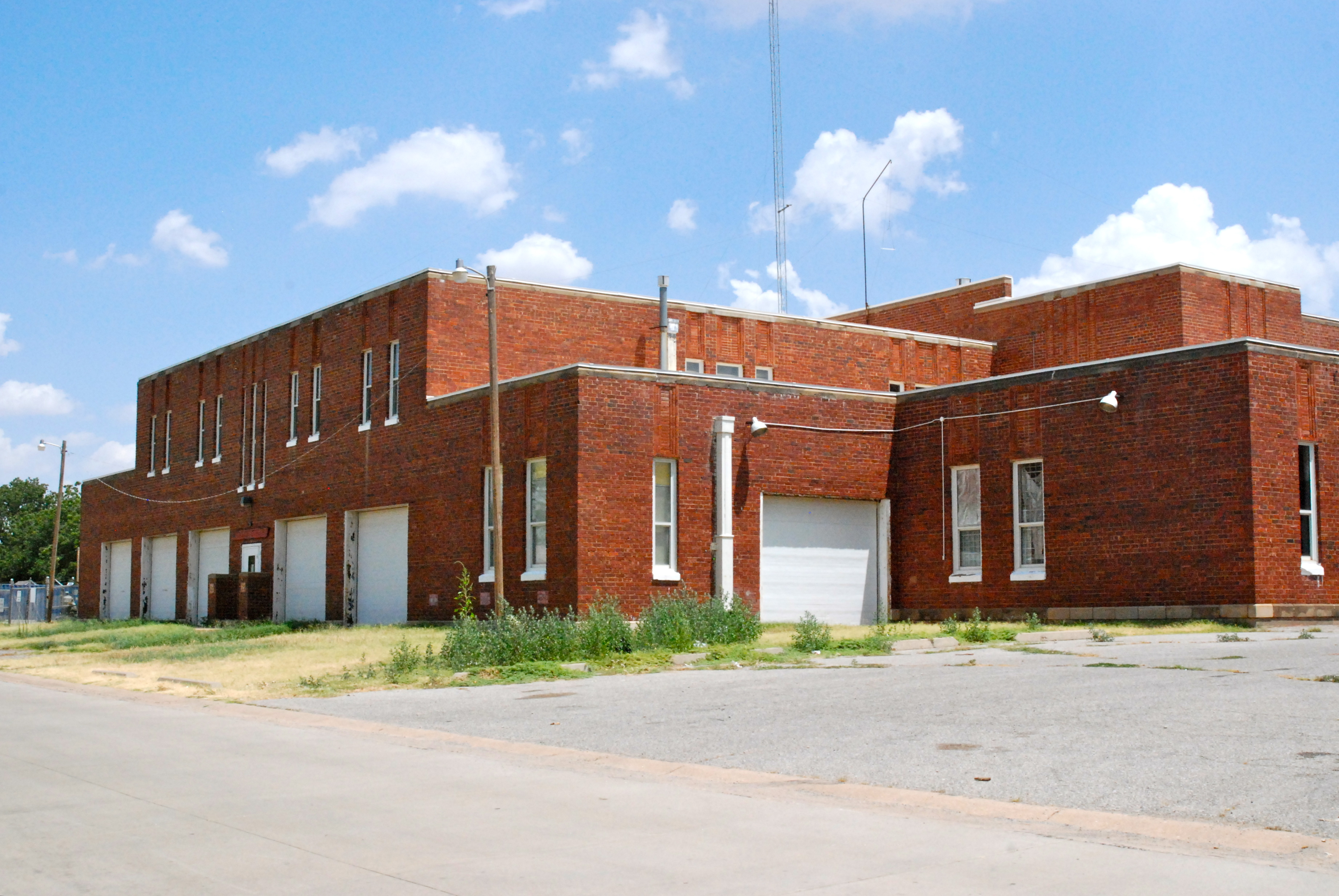

- Location within Oklahoma Location within the United States
- Location: 600 E. Elm, Enid, Oklahoma
- Coordinates: 36°24′0″N 97°52′12″W
- Area: 3 acres (1.2 ha)
- Built: 1936
- Architectural style: Art Deco, Vernacular Art Deco
- MPS: WPA Public Bldgs., Recreational Facilities and Water Quality Improvements in Northwestern Oklahoma, 1935--1943 TR
- NRHP reference No.: 88001370
- Added to NRHP: September 08, 1988

The Enid Armory was located in Enid, Oklahoma and has been listed on the National Register of Historic Places since 1988. The two-story building was constructed in 1936 as a Works Progress Administration project. It was the third largest Armory in Oklahoma.

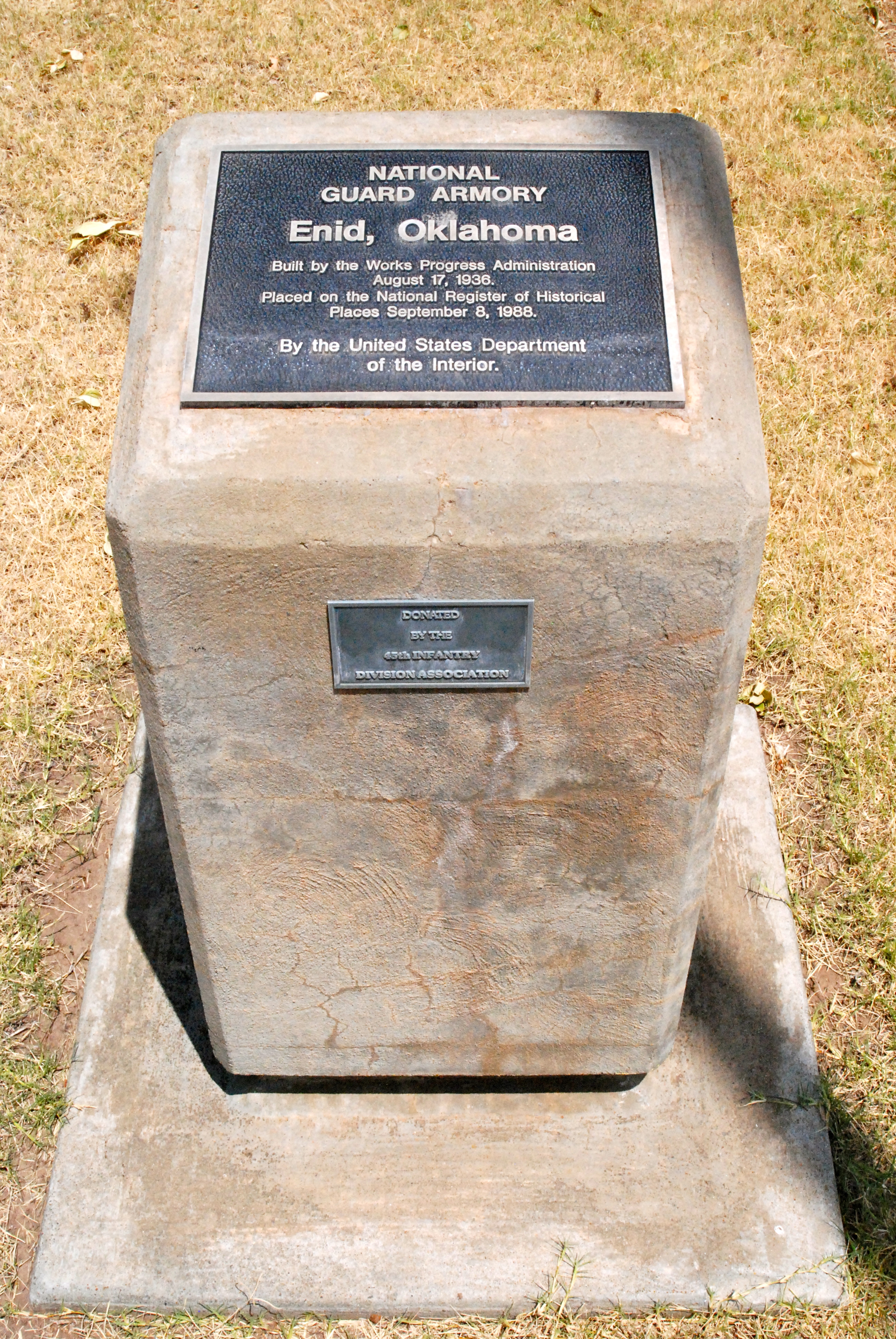
A historical marker in front of the armory notes that it was built on August 17, 1936 by the Works Progress Administration placed on the National Register of Historic Places on September 8, 1988.

Of the WPA-built armories in Oklahoma, the Enid Armory was the only one utilizing red brick in its construction. The Oklahoma National Guard trained soldiers for combat in World War II and Korea. In 2005, the Base Realignment and Closure (BRAC) Commission voted to close 53 state armories and build Armed Forces Reserve Centers, including one at Vance Air Force Base. The Enid Armory location was approved by city commissioners as a new site for Garfield Elementary School, and was demolished by the Enid Public School system, following the opening of the Armed Forces Reserve Center at Vance, and the removal of lead and asbestos from the site by the Oklahoma Department of Environmental Quality. The first Enid Armory was constructed in 1925 at Phillips University. The 189th Field Artillery Regiment of the Oklahoma National Guard was stationed at Phillips from 1921 to 1936. On July 7, 1933, Clyde and Buck Barrow broke into the armory, stealing a cache of weapons and ammunition and a pair of binoculars. Their take was so large it filled their car, causing seating difficulty, and overflowed from the bathtub they'd used as storage.

== Gallery ==
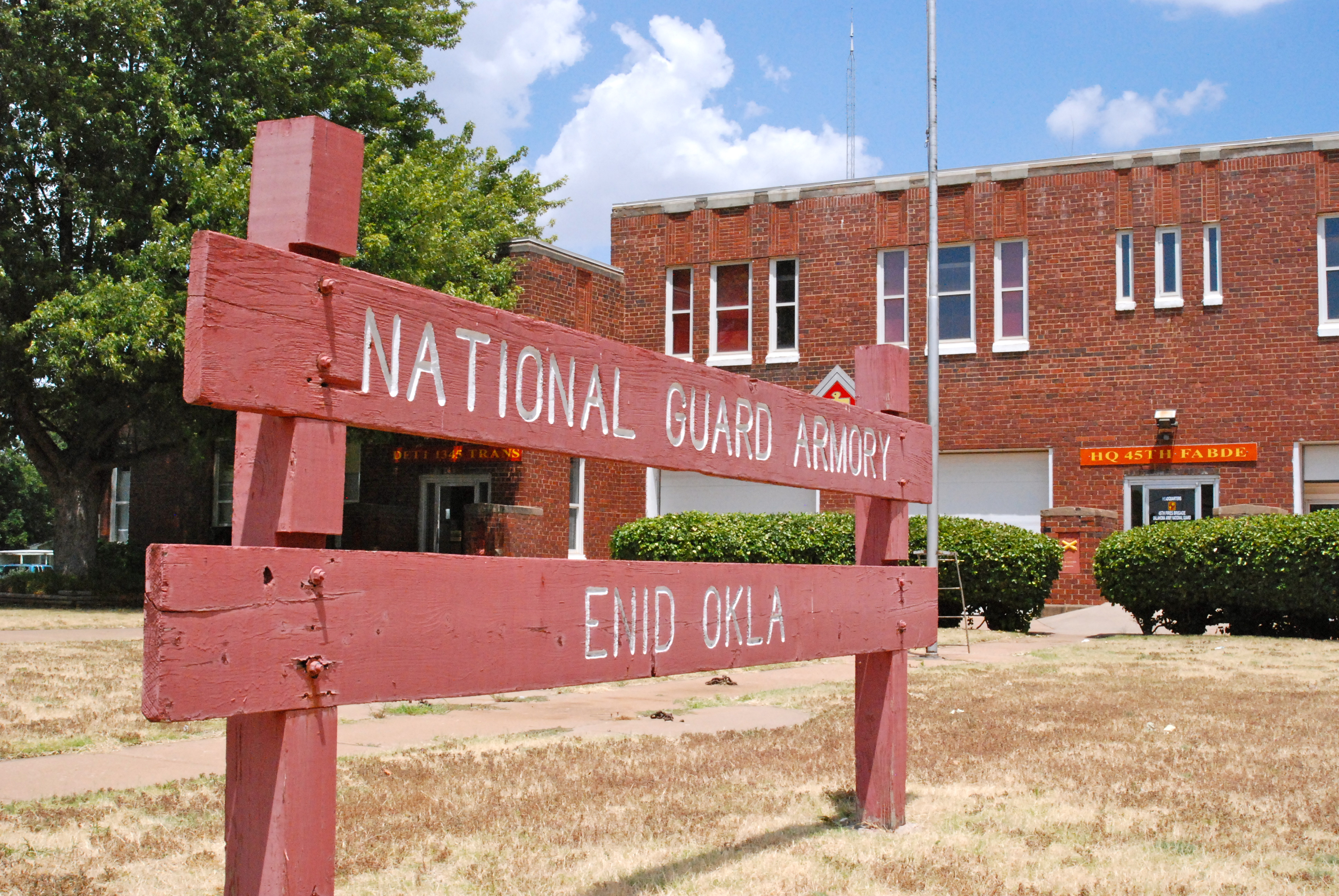
A front view of the Enid Armory.

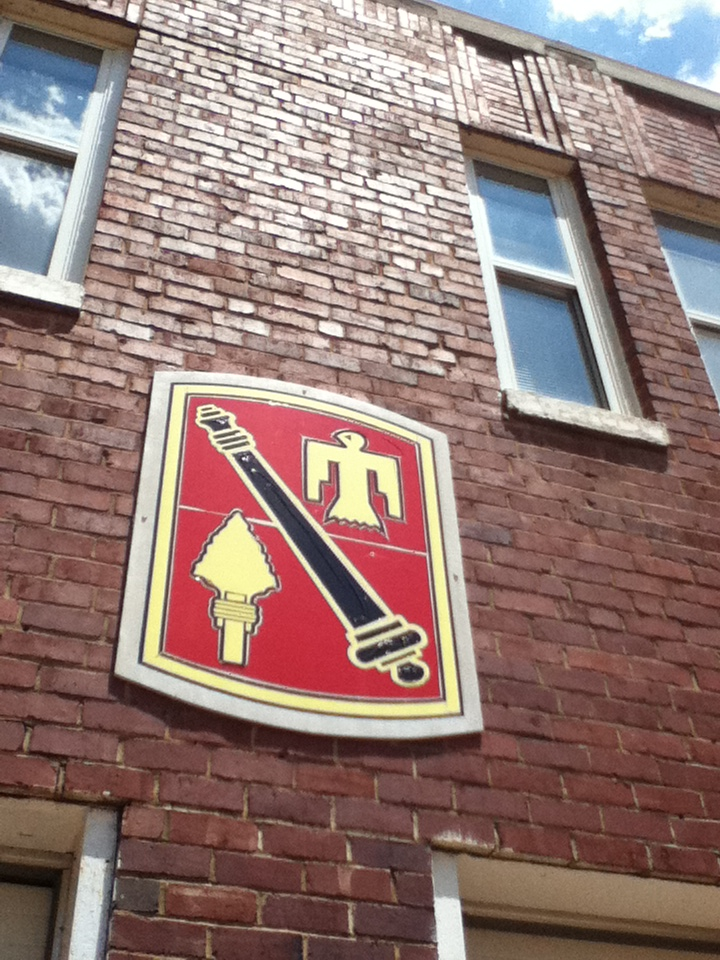
Insignia for Oklahoma 45th on the front of the building.

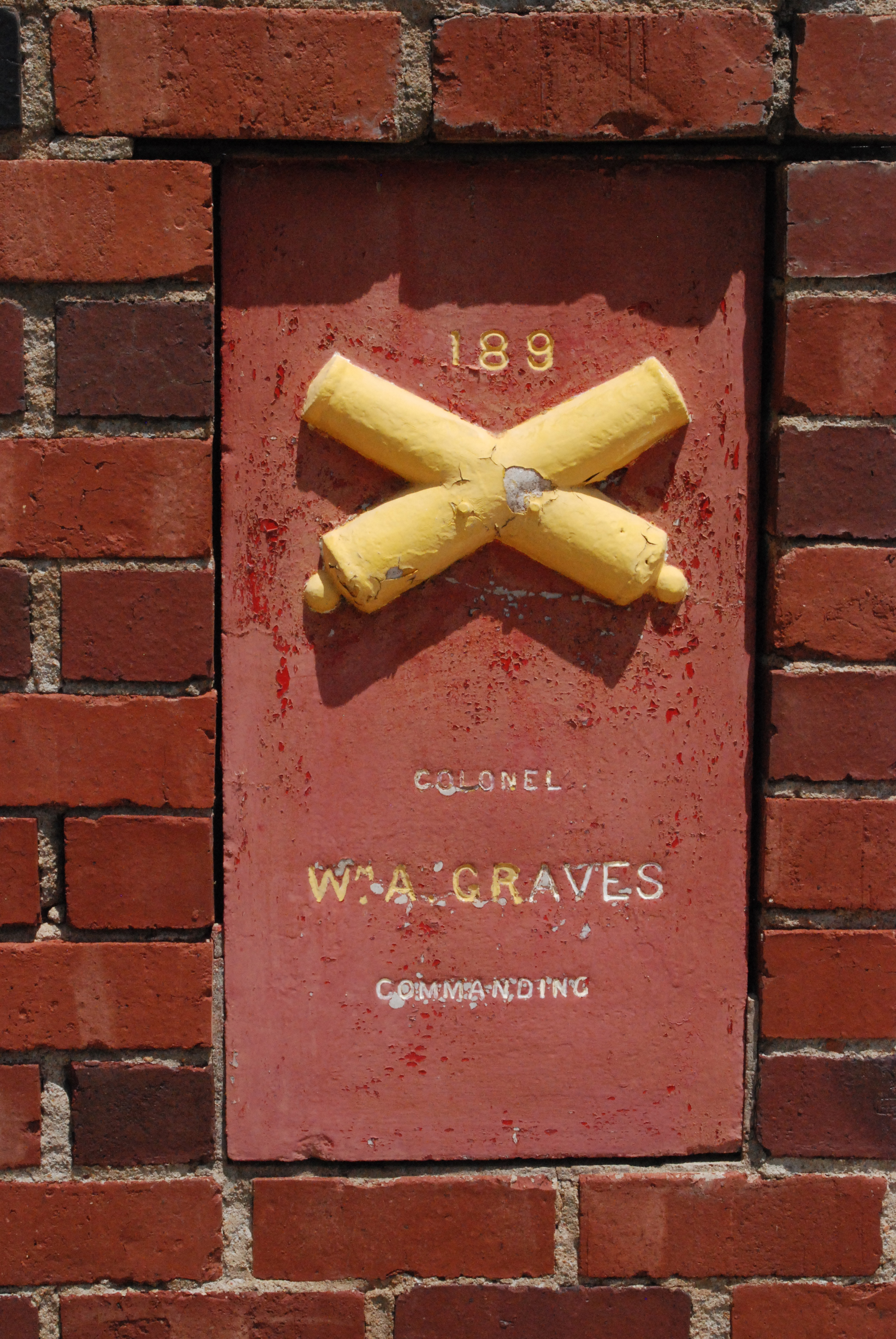
A plaque adorns the side of the entrance featuring two crossed cannons, and reads "Colonel William A. Graves, Commanding."

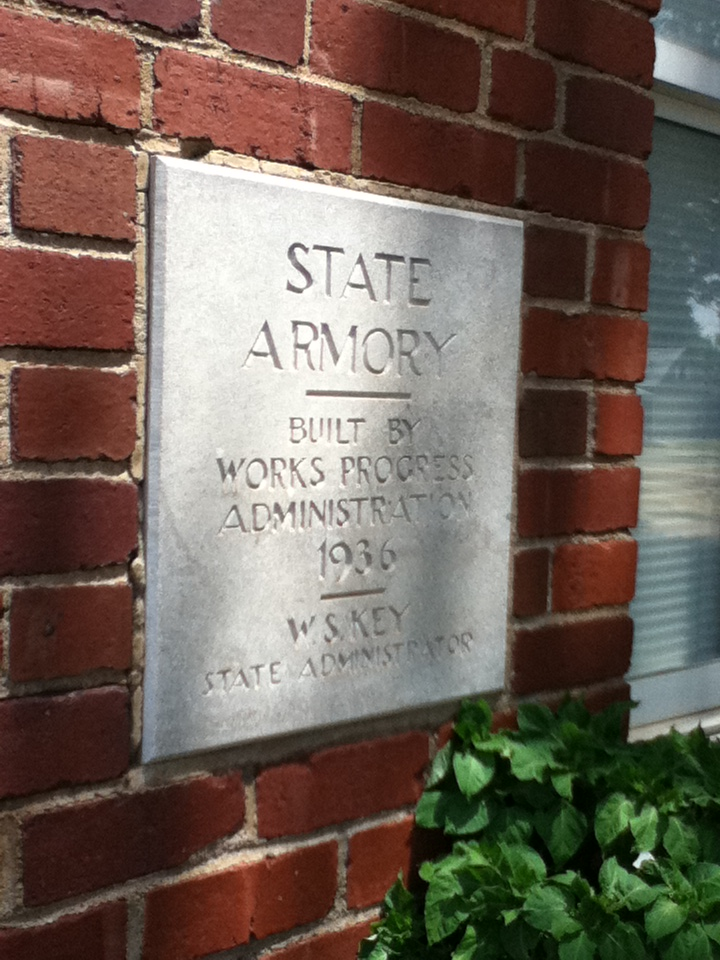
The cornerstone for the Enid Armory reads: "State Armory, built by Works Progress Administration 1936, W.S. Key, State Administrator.
