= Fairmont, Oklahoma =

- Town
- Location in Garfield County and the state of Oklahoma.
- Coordinates: 36°21′22″N 97°42′20″W
- Country: United States
- State: Oklahoma
- County: Garfield

Area
  - Total: 0.24 sq mi (0.62 km^{2})
  - Land: 0.24 sq mi (0.62 km^{2})
  - Water: 0 sq mi (0.00 km^{2})
- Elevation: 1,204 ft (367 m)

Population (2020)
  - Total: 132
  - Density: 555.4/sq mi (214.45/km^{2})
- Time zone: UTC-6 (Central (CST))
  - Summer (DST): UTC-5 (CDT)
- ZIP code: 73736
- Area code: 580
- FIPS code: 40-24950
- GNIS feature ID: 2412615

Fairmont is a town in Garfield County, Oklahoma, United States. As of the 2020 census, Fairmont had a population of 132.

== History ==
Patterson Township, which surrounds Fairmont, began to be settled in 1893, immediately after the opening of the Cherokee Outlet. The Denver, Enid and Gulf Railroad constructed a line through area in 1902. The Enid Right of Way and Townsite Company platted Fairmont on October 18, 1902. A post office was established in December of that year. Previously, residents had received mail at the Luella post office. The Arkansas Valley and Western Railway constructed a branch from Tulsa through Perry and Covington to Steen (northeast of Enid) in 1902–03. The two railroads crossed at Fairmont, making the town a hub of agricultural services. (Note: The Atchison, Topeka and Santa Fe Railway acquired the Denver, Enid and Gulf Railroad in 1907. The St. Louis and San Francisco Railway (also known as the Frisco Railway) acquired the Arkansas Valley and Western Railway in 1907 also.) Two elevators were built along the Frisco and two along the Santa Fe.

Agriculture has been the primary economic base for Fairmont since its founding. The principal crop is wheat. Petroleum bolstered the town after oil was discovered in the county in 1916. An oil refinery was built near Fairmont. It was acquired by the Champlin Refining Company in 1925.

== Geography ==
Fairmont is 10 miles (16 km) east southeast of Enid, the county seat.

According to the United States Census Bureau, the town has a total area of 0.3 square miles (0.78 km^{2}), all land.

== Demographics ==
Historical population
Census	Pop.	Note	%±
1920	166		—
1930	169		1.8%
1940	153		−9.5%
1950	134		−12.4%
1960	115		−14.2%
1970	154		33.9%
1980	419		172.1%
1990	129		−69.2%
2000	147		14.0%
2010	134		−8.8%
2020	132		−1.5%

=== 2020 census ===
As of the 2020 census, Fairmont had a population of 132. The median age was 52.0 years. 16.7% of residents were under the age of 18 and 25.0% of residents were 65 years of age or older. For every 100 females there were 123.7 males, and for every 100 females age 18 and over there were 107.5 males age 18 and over.

0.0% of residents lived in urban areas, while 100.0% lived in rural areas.

There were 58 households in Fairmont, of which 46.6% had children under the age of 18 living in them. Of all households, 56.9% were married-couple households, 13.8% were households with a male householder and no spouse or partner present, and 20.7% were households with a female householder and no spouse or partner present. About 15.5% of all households were made up of individuals and 6.9% had someone living alone who was 65 years of age or older.

There were 59 housing units, of which 1.7% were vacant. The homeowner vacancy rate was 0.0% and the rental vacancy rate was 0.0%.

Racial composition as of the 2020 census
Race	Number	Percent
White	119	90.2%
Black or African American	1	0.8%
American Indian and Alaska Native	10	7.6%
Asian	0	0.0%
Native Hawaiian and Other Pacific Islander	0	0.0%
Some other race	0	0.0%
Two or more races	2	1.5%
Hispanic or Latino (of any race)	1	0.8%

=== 2000 census ===
As of the census of 2000, there were 147 people, 58 households, and 41 families residing in the town. The population density was 519.1 inhabitants per square mile (200.4/km^{2}). There were 66 housing units at an average density of 233.1 per square mile (90.0/km^{2}). The racial makeup of the town was 97.96% White, 2.04% from other races. Hispanic or Latino of any race were 4.76% of the population.

There were 58 households, out of which 29.3% had children under the age of 18 living with them, 67.2% were married couples living together, 3.4% had a female householder with no husband present, and 29.3% were non-families. 29.3% of all households were made up of individuals, and 15.5% had someone living alone who was 65 years of age or older. The average household size was 2.53 and the average family size was 3.12.

In the town, the population was spread out, with 25.2% under the age of 18, 6.8% from 18 to 24, 29.3% from 25 to 44, 24.5% from 45 to 64, and 14.3% who were 65 years of age or older. The median age was 38 years. For every 100 females, there were 116.2 males. For every 100 females age 18 and over, there were 86.4 males.

The median income for a household in the town was $39,375, and the median income for a family was $43,750. Males had a median income of $31,750 versus $25,417 for females. The per capita income for the town was $18,111. There were 9.5% of families and 5.8% of the population living below the poverty line, including no under eighteens and none of those over 64.

== Education ==
Its school district is Garber Public Schools.
