= Hunter, Oklahoma =

- Town
- Location in Garfield County and the state of Oklahoma.
- Coordinates: 36°33′50″N 97°39′45″W
- Country: United States
- State: Oklahoma
- County: Garfield

Area
  - Total: 0.24 sq mi (0.61 km^{2})
  - Land: 0.24 sq mi (0.61 km^{2})
  - Water: 0 sq mi (0.00 km^{2})
- Elevation: 1,089 ft (332 m)

Population (2020)
  - Total: 145
  - Density: 618/sq mi (238.5/km^{2})
- Time zone: UTC-6 (Central (CST))
  - Summer (DST): UTC-5 (CDT)
- ZIP code: 74640
- Area code: 580
- FIPS code: 40-36600
- GNIS feature ID: 2412781

Hunter is a town in Garfield County, Oklahoma, United States. It is located about 17 miles northeast of Enid, Oklahoma, and about 4 miles west of combined State 15 and State 74. The population was 145 as of the 2020 Census.

== Geography ==
According to the United States Census Bureau, the town has a total area of 0.2 square miles (0.52 km^{2}), all land.

== Demographics ==
Historical population
Census	Pop.	Note	%±
1910	341		—
1920	443		29.9%
1930	336		−24.2%
1940	443		31.8%
1950	279		−37.0%
1960	203		−27.2%
1970	274		35.0%
1980	276		0.7%
1990	218		−21.0%
2000	173		−20.6%
2010	165		−4.6%
2020	145		−12.1%

=== 2020 census ===
As of the 2020 census, Hunter had a population of 145. The median age was 42.5 years. 24.8% of residents were under the age of 18 and 19.3% of residents were 65 years of age or older. For every 100 females there were 104.2 males, and for every 100 females age 18 and over there were 105.7 males age 18 and over.

0.0% of residents lived in urban areas, while 100.0% lived in rural areas.

There were 64 households in Hunter, of which 32.8% had children under the age of 18 living in them. Of all households, 56.3% were married-couple households, 25.0% were households with a male householder and no spouse or partner present, and 12.5% were households with a female householder and no spouse or partner present. About 18.7% of all households were made up of individuals and 11.0% had someone living alone who was 65 years of age or older.

There were 72 housing units, of which 11.1% were vacant. The homeowner vacancy rate was 0.0% and the rental vacancy rate was 0.0%.

Racial composition as of the 2020 census
Race	Number	Percent
White	127	87.6%
Black or African American	0	0.0%
American Indian and Alaska Native	5	3.4%
Asian	0	0.0%
Native Hawaiian and Other Pacific Islander	0	0.0%
Some other race	4	2.8%
Two or more races	9	6.2%
Hispanic or Latino (of any race)	4	2.8%

=== 2000 census ===
As of the census of 2000, there were 173 people, 74 households, and 50 families residing in the town. The population density was 704.6 inhabitants per square mile (272.0/km^{2}). There were 96 housing units at an average density of 391.0 per square mile (151.0/km^{2}). The racial makeup of the town was 99.42% White and 0.58% Native American.

There were 74 households, out of which 25.7% had children under the age of 18 living with them, 62.2% were married couples living together, 1.4% had a female householder with no husband present, and 32.4% were non-families. 31.1% of all households were made up of individuals, and 20.3% had someone living alone who was 65 years of age or older. The average household size was 2.34 and the average family size was 2.94.

In the town, the population was spread out, with 21.4% under the age of 18, 5.2% from 18 to 24, 23.1% from 25 to 44, 30.1% from 45 to 64, and 20.2% who were 65 years of age or older. The median age was 45 years. For every 100 females, there were 92.2 males. For every 100 females age 18 and over, there were 100.0 males.

The median income for a household in the town was $25,625, and the median income for a family was $33,333. Males had a median income of $28,750 versus $13,750 for females. The per capita income for the town was $11,731. About 13.0% of families and 17.1% of the population were below the poverty line, including 26.4% of those under the age of 81 and none of those 65 or over.
