= Blackwell, Enid and Southwestern Railway =

Former railway operating in Kansas, Oklahoma, and Texas

Overview
- Locale: Kansas, Oklahoma, Texas
- Dates of operation: 1900–1907
- Successor: St. Louis-San Francisco Railway

Technical
- Track gauge: 4 ft 8 1/2 in (1,435 mm) standard gauge

The Blackwell, Enid and Southwestern Railway (BES) was built as a short line railroad operating in Kansas, Oklahoma, and Texas.

It was founded in March 1900 to link the Frisco Beaumont, Kansas subdivision and Vernon, Texas. When the government opened the Kiowa-Comanche-Apache Indian Reservation for settlement on August 6, 1901, Choctaw Construction Company (later part of the Bee Line Construction Company) began construction of 251 miles of track from Vernon, Texas north to Blackwell and Enid in Indian Territory. The line was built in sections, starting from Blackwell, Oklahoma to Darrow, Oklahoma (84.3 mi.) in 1900–01. Then from Darrow to the Red River (154.3 mi) in 1901–03. On July 20, 1907, the railroad was purchased by the St. Louis-San Francisco Railway (the "Frisco"), who operated it until November 21, 1980, when the Frisco was acquired by Burlington Northern.

== Passenger Service ==
The Western Division operated the Texas Express passenger train between Enid, Oklahoma and Vernon, Texas in each direction. The timetable from the 1930s shows that southbound train 609 departed from Enid at 12:20 p.m. and arrived at Vernon at 7:45 p.m.. The northbound train 610 departed Vernon at 6:30 a.m. and arrived at Enid at 1:45 p.m.

== Freight Service ==
The Western Division ran a freight train daily between Enid, Oklahoma and Vernon, Texas in each direction. The timetable used to operate the layout shows that southbound local 667 departed Snyder at 7:45 a.m. and arrived at Vernon at 10:40 a.m.. The northbound local 668 departed Vernon at 1:30 p.m. and arrived at Snyder at 4:45 p.m.

== Geography ==
The line running southwest from Enid, Oklahoma to Vernon, Texas became known as the Hobart Subdivision of the Frisco's Western Division. The topography is flat prairie with a few granite outcroppings located near Snyder, Oklahoma. Another topographical feature of the Hobart Subdivision was the long timber bridge over the Red River that runs east and west between Oklahoma and Texas.

The line between Enid, Oklahoma to Beaumont, Kansas traversed the central Great Plains in the heart of North America's winter wheat belt.

== Current operations ==
Enid, Oklahoma to Frederick, Oklahoma is now Grainbelt since 1987 (177.7 mi.). The principal commodities handled by Farmrail are wheat, crude and processed gypsum, feed ingredients, crushed stone, oilfield drilling fluids, petroleum products, fertilizers and agricultural machinery.

== Abandonments ==
Davidson, Oklahoma to Vernon, Texas - 1957 (15.32 mi.)
Winfield, Kansas to Beaumont, Kansas - 1977 (42.0 mi.)
Arkansas City, Kansas to Winfield, Kansas - 1982 (20.2 mi.)
Enid, Oklahoma to Arkansas City, Kansas - 1982 (71.1 mi.)
Davidson, Oklahoma to Frederick, Oklahoma - unknown, likely post-1982
Last train from Enid to Arkansas City 5/29/1982
