= North Enid, Oklahoma =

- Town
- Location in Garfield County and the state of Oklahoma
- Coordinates: 36°26′45″N 97°51′48″W
- Country: United States
- State: Oklahoma
- County: Garfield

Area
  - Total: 2.34 sq mi (6.07 km^{2})
  - Land: 2.34 sq mi (6.07 km^{2})
  - Water: 0 sq mi (0.00 km^{2})
- Elevation: 1,260 ft (380 m)

Population (2020)
  - Total: 1,003
  - Density: 428.2/sq mi (165.34/km^{2})
- Time zone: UTC-6 (Central (CST))
  - Summer (DST): UTC-5 (CDT)
- FIPS code: 40-52600
- GNIS feature ID: 2413053
- Website: www.townofnorthenid.org

North Enid is a town in Garfield County, Oklahoma, United States. The population was 1,003 at the 2020 census. The town is served by the Chisholm school district. North Enid was the original railroad town site in the Enid–Pond Creek Railroad War.

== Geography ==
North Enid is located north of the center of Garfield County and is bordered to the west, south, and east by the city of Enid, the county seat.

U.S. Route 64 runs along the western edge of the town as 4th Street, leading south into the center of Enid. U.S. Routes 60 and 81 join US 64 from the west, and all three highways form the northern portion of the town's western edge. The combined highway runs north 16 miles (26 km) to a point west of Pond Creek.

According to the United States Census Bureau, the town has a total area of 2.3 square miles (6.0 km^{2}), all land.

== Demographics ==
Historical population
Census	Pop.	Note	%±
1900	205		—
1910	128		−37.6%
1920	95		−25.8%
1930	165		73.7%
1940	166		0.6%
1950	219		31.9%
1960	286		30.6%
1970	730		155.2%
1980	992		35.9%
1990	874		−11.9%
2000	796		−8.9%
2010	860		8.0%
2020	1,003		16.6%

=== 2020 census ===
As of the 2020 census, North Enid had a population of 1,003. The median age was 39.7 years. 28.8% of residents were under the age of 18 and 18.3% of residents were 65 years of age or older. For every 100 females there were 94.4 males, and for every 100 females age 18 and over there were 97.2 males age 18 and over.

83.2% of residents lived in urban areas, while 16.8% lived in rural areas.

There were 366 households in North Enid, of which 39.9% had children under the age of 18 living in them. Of all households, 67.2% were married-couple households, 13.4% were households with a male householder and no spouse or partner present, and 15.6% were households with a female householder and no spouse or partner present. About 15.0% of all households were made up of individuals and 7.6% had someone living alone who was 65 years of age or older.

There were 380 housing units, of which 3.7% were vacant. The homeowner vacancy rate was 2.7% and the rental vacancy rate was 5.1%.

Racial composition as of the 2020 census
Race	Number	Percent
White	854	85.1%
Black or African American	7	0.7%
American Indian and Alaska Native	9	0.9%
Asian	1	0.1%
Native Hawaiian and Other Pacific Islander	11	1.1%
Some other race	21	2.1%
Two or more races	100	10.0%
Hispanic or Latino (of any race)	65	6.5%

=== 2010 census ===
As of the census of 2010, there were 860 people, up from 796 people in 2000.

=== 2000 census ===
In 2000, there were 302 households, and 244 families residing in the town. The population density was 352.6 inhabitants per square mile (136.1/km^{2}). There were 313 housing units at an average density of 138.7 per square mile (53.6/km^{2}). The racial makeup of the town was 96.48% White, 0.25% African American, 1.63% Native American, and 1.63% from two or more races. Hispanic or Latino of any race were 0.38% of the population.

There were 302 households, out of which 33.1% had children under the age of 18 living with them, 75.2% were married couples living together, 3.3% had a female householder with no husband present, and 18.9% were non-families. 17.2% of all households were made up of individuals, and 10.6% had someone living alone who was 65 years of age or older. The average household size was 2.64 and the average family size was 2.97.

In the town, the population was spread out, with 24.6% under the age of 18, 5.5% from 18 to 24, 25.4% from 25 to 44, 29.5% from 45 to 64, and 14.9% who were 65 years of age or older. The median age was 42 years. For every 100 females, there were 96.5 males. For every 100 females age 18 and over, there were 93.5 males.

The median income for a household in the town was $47,212, and the median income for a family was $51,667. Males had a median income of $33,000 versus $21,484 for females. The per capita income for the town was $18,416. About 4.8% of families and 5.5% of the population were below the poverty line, including 5.0% of those under age 18 and 15.8% of those age 65 or over.

== Education ==
It is zoned to Chisholm Public Schools.

== See also ==
- List of cities and towns in Oklahoma
