= Tornadoes of 1991 =

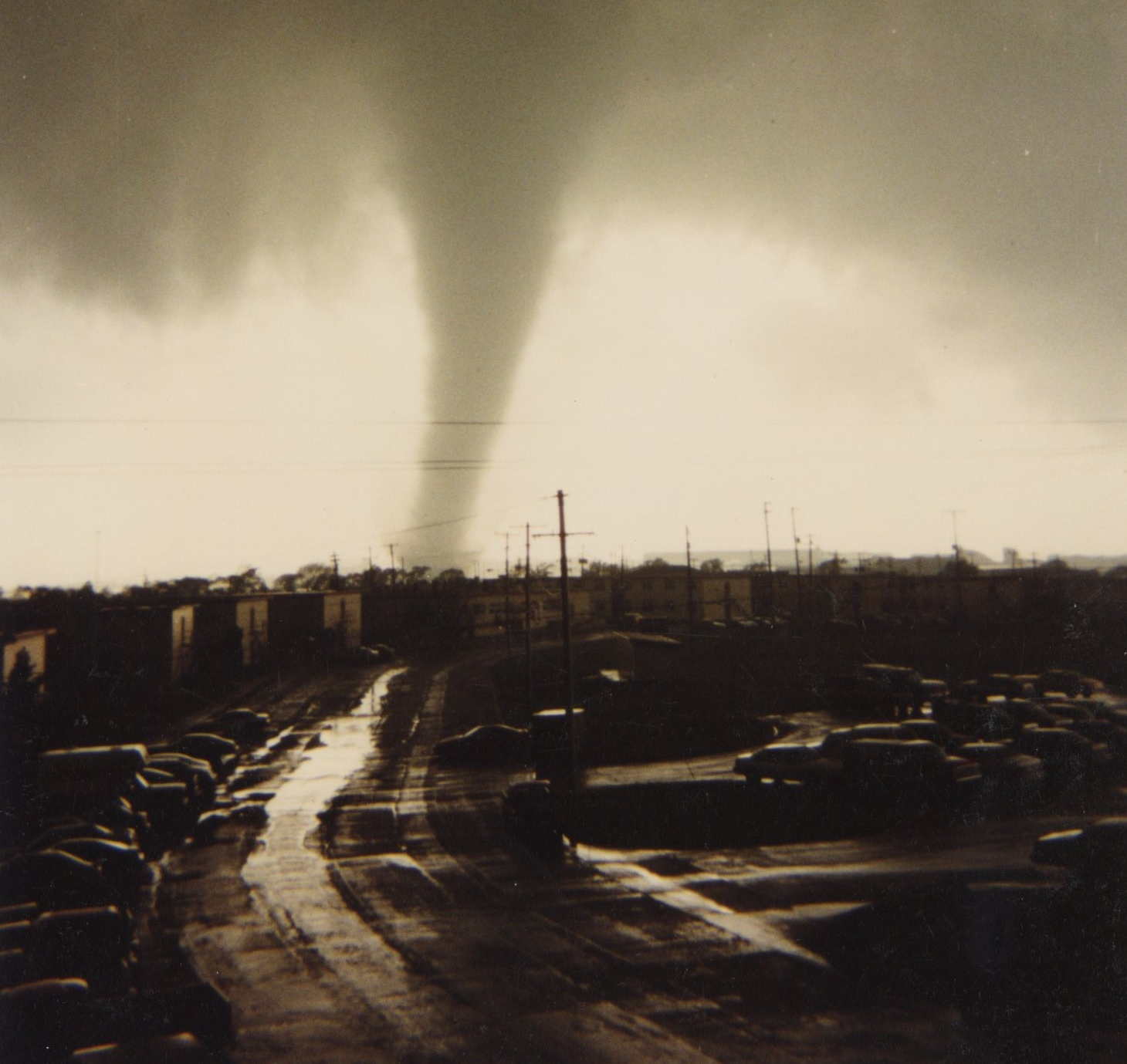
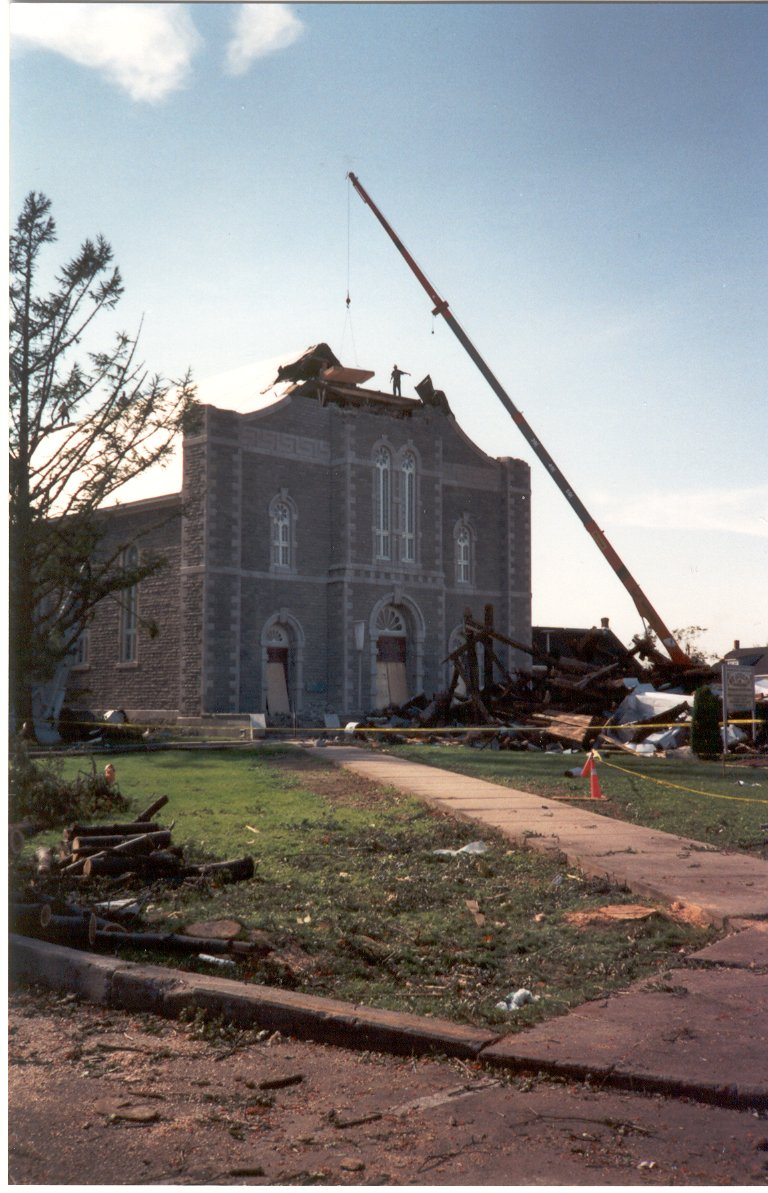
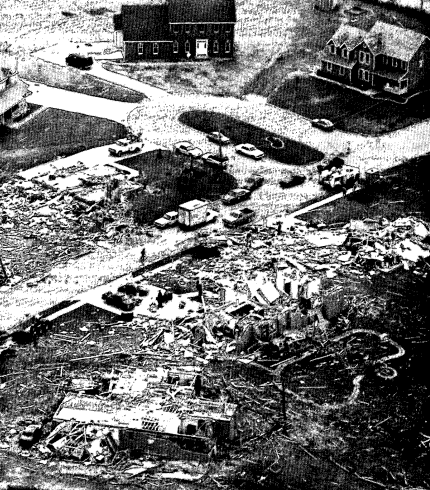
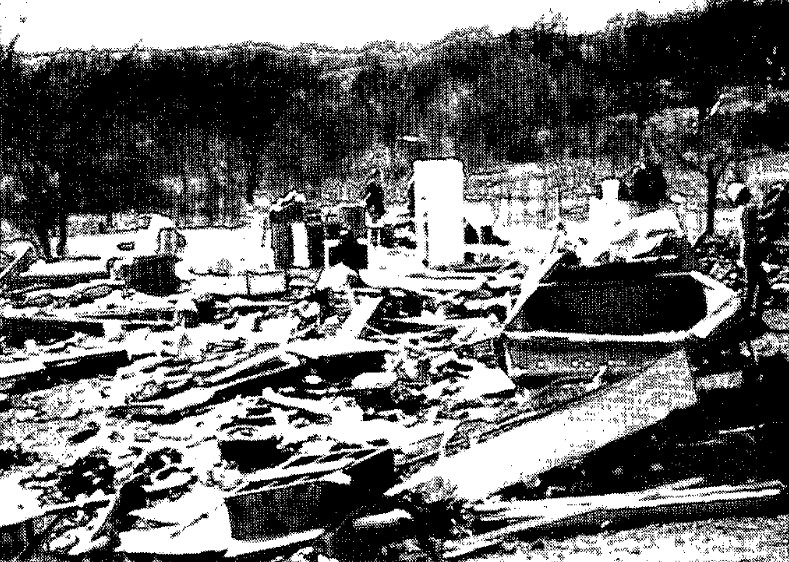
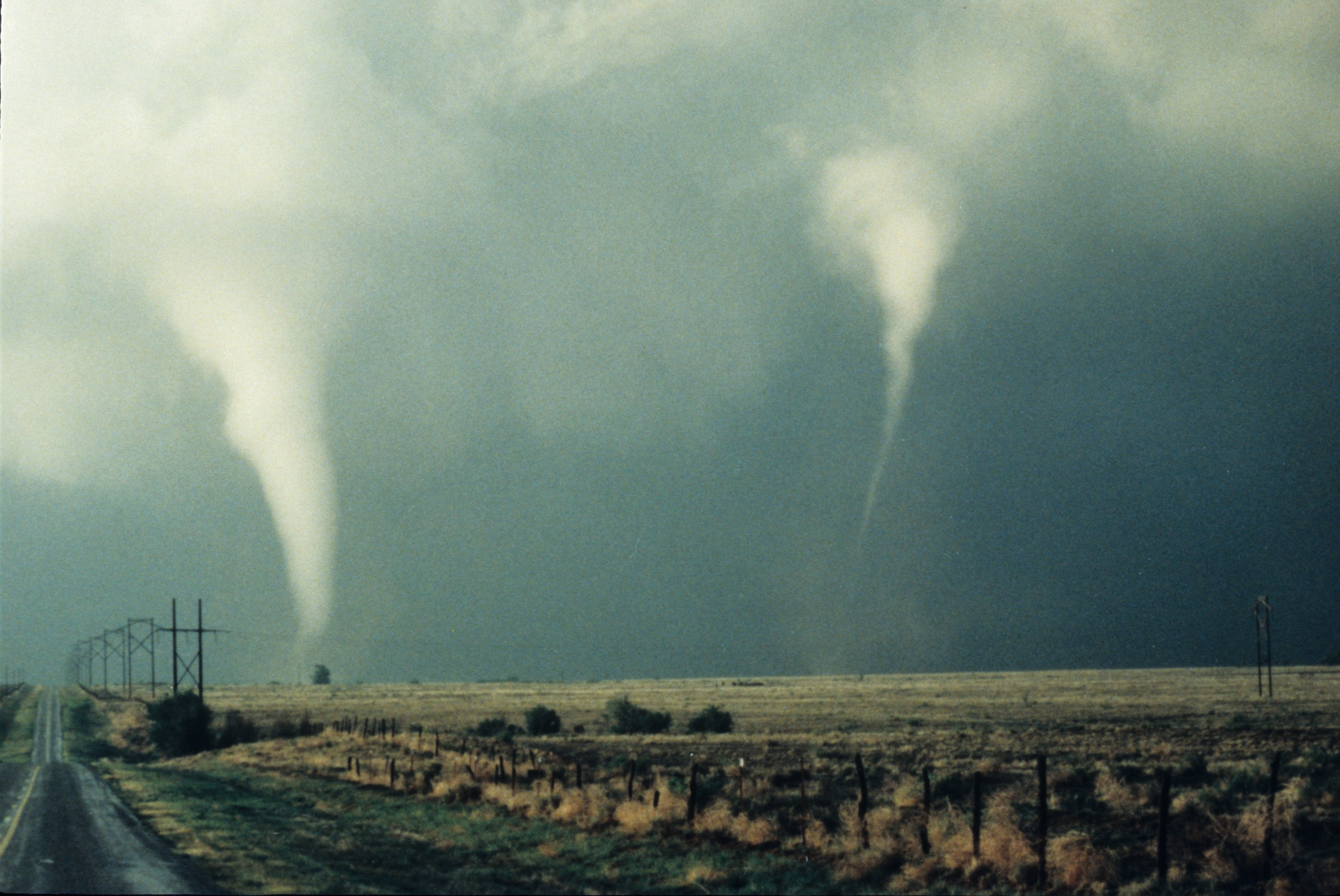
- Clockwise from top: A large F5 tornado approaching McConnell Air Force Base at F3 intensity on April 26; A church in Maskinongé, Quebec that was struck by an F3 tornado on August 27; Damage in Durant, Oklahoma after an F2 tornado on March 21; Twin tornadoes near Amherst, Texas on May 10; F4 damage in Springfield, Missouri after a tornado on November 29; A radar loop of tornado producing supercells across Kansas and Oklahoma on April 26.
- Timespan: January–December 1991
- Maximum rated tornado: F5 tornado: Andover, Kansas on April 26
- Tornadoes in U.S.: 1,132
- Damage (U.S.): >$589 million
- Fatalities (U.S.): 39
- Fatalities (worldwide): >134

This page documents the tornadoes and tornado outbreaks of 1991, primarily in the United States. Most tornadoes form in the U.S., although some events may take place internationally. Tornado statistics for older years like this often appear significantly lower than modern years due to fewer reports or confirmed tornadoes, however by the 1990s tornado statistics were coming closer to the numbers we see today.

== Synopsis ==
Fatal United States tornadoes in 1991
- Approximate touchdown location of killer tornadoes in 1991 Summary of tornadoes: January 14 – Texas (1 death); March 22 – Tennessee (4 deaths); March 22 – Kentucky (1 death); March 22 – Tennessee (1 death); March 27 – Wisconsin (1 death); March 27 – Ohio, Indiana (1 death); March 29 – Alabama (5 deaths); April 26 – Kansas (17 deaths); April 26 – Kansas (1 death); April 26 – Kansas (1 death); April 26 – Oklahoma (1 death); April 26 – Oklahoma (1 death); June 12 – New York (1 death); July 5 – Minnesota (1 death); November 29 – Missouri (2 deaths); Total fatalities: 39

1991 saw an average to below average amount of tornadoes, with the majority of tornadoes occurring between a time period of March - June with several tornado outbreaks. However, the Andover, Kansas F5 tornado was known for its incredible video footage and was the most notable tornado outbreak of the year. (Andover would later be hit again more than 30 years later in 2022 by an EF3 tornado.)

== Events ==
Confirmed tornado total for the entire year 1991 in the United States.

Confirmed tornadoes by Fujita rating
FU	F0	F1	F2	F3	F4	F5	Total
0	688	295	103	39	6	1	1,132

== January ==
There were 29 tornadoes confirmed in the US in January.

== February ==
There were 11 tornadoes confirmed in the US in February.

== March ==
There were 157 tornadoes confirmed in the US in March.

=== March 22 ===
An outbreak produced 23 tornadoes, with six fatalities being confirmed in Kentucky and Tennessee. An 11-year-old boy was killed in Olmstead in Logan County, Kentucky when an F2 tornado picked up a mobile home and slammed it against a tree.

=== March 26–29 (United States) ===
An outbreak produced 50 tornadoes over a two day span. An F4 tornado passed near Hutchinson, Kansas on March 26, while two people were killed by tornadoes in Wisconsin and Indiana on March 27. After only two weak F0 tornadoes touched down on March 28, another outbreak of 21 tornadoes struck the Southeastern United States on March 29. An F1 tornado struck Munford, Alabama, where it destroyed several trailer homes, killing five people, four of them in one family. An F3 tornado moved through Clarkdale, Georgia, destroying 15 townhouses, damaging 120 others, and injuring 25 people. An F2 tornado destroyed 16 homes and heavily damaged 39 others in Ladonia, Alabama, injuring 16 people. In all, 73 tornadoes touched down during the outbreak sequence.

== April ==
There were 204 tornadoes confirmed in the US in April.

=== April 26–27 (United States) ===
FU	F0	F1	F2	F3	F4	F5
0	12	16	16	7	4	1

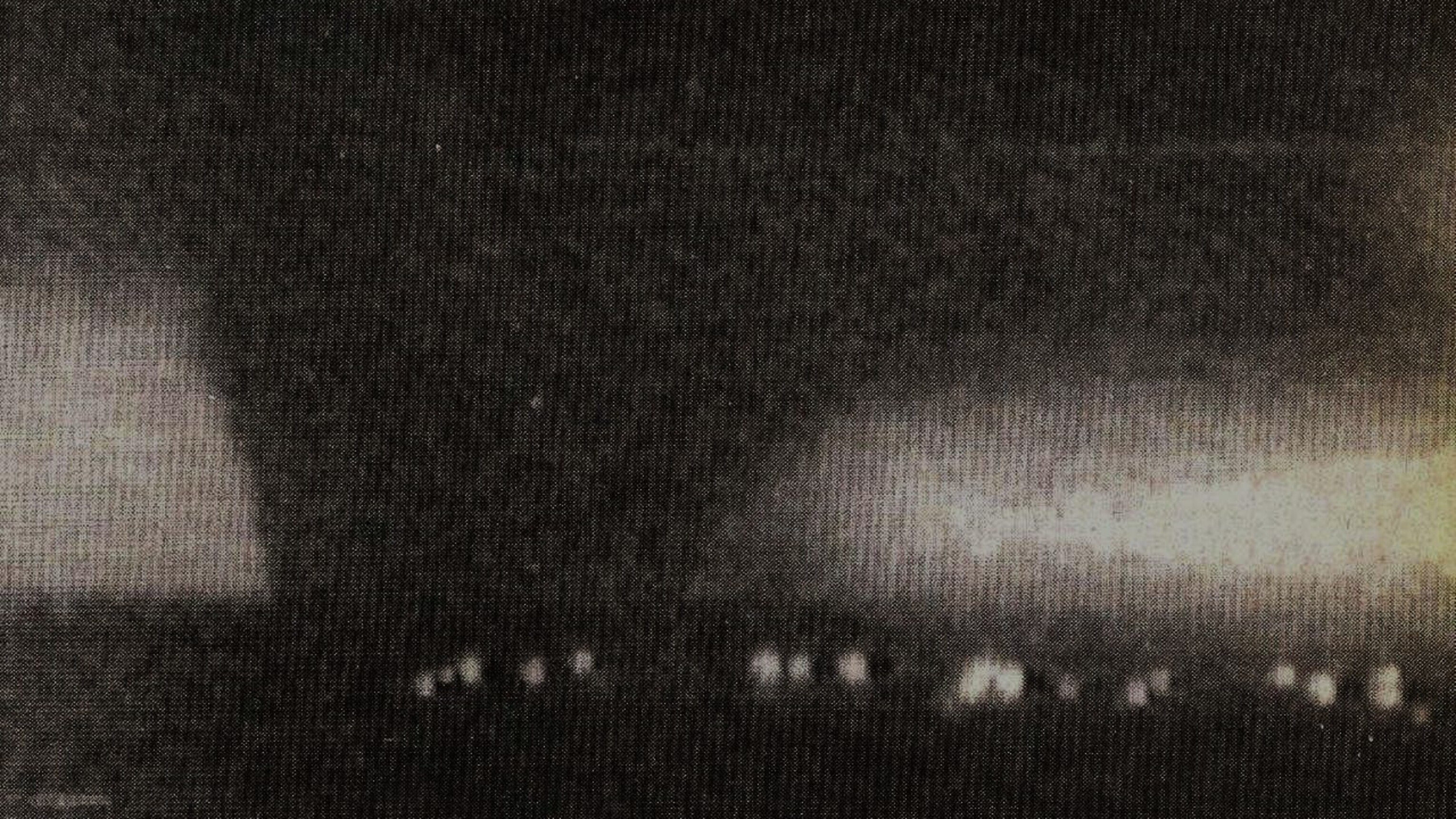
A nocturnal F4 tornado in Oologah, Oklahoma

A major and destructive tornado outbreak affected parts of the Great Plains region on April 26, with intense to violent tornadoes reported in Iowa, Kansas, Nebraska, Oklahoma and Texas. In Kansas, a widely documented, and killer F5 tornado struck parts of the Wichita metropolitan area, heavily affecting Haysville, Towanda and El Dorado, but especially Andover. 17 people died from this tornado as it tore through. Another lethal F4 tornado struck further south near Arkansas City and Winfield, destroying numerous homes and farmsteads in its wake. Down south in Oklahoma near Red Rock, a large and extremely violent F4 tornado was observed to have winds as high as 286 miles per hour (460 km/h) by a storm chasing research team from the University of Oklahoma. After dusk, one cyclic supercell across northern and northeastern Oklahoma put down two F4 tornadoes that struck Westport and Oologah, causing many injuries and much destruction, and with one person killed at the Cimarron Turnpike.

On April 27, only half a dozen tornadoes occurred across Iowa and Texas, but also Georgia and Missouri. The strongest tornado on this day, occurred in Iowa, near the city of Victor. In total, at least 58 tornadoes were confirmed during the two-day outbreak. Over 20 people died and more than 300 others were injured from the tornadoes.

== May ==
There were 335 tornadoes confirmed in the US in May.

=== May 10 ===
At least five tornadoes formed in Lazbuddie, Texas.

=== May 15 ===
An outbreak of five tornadoes struck Western and Northwestern Oklahoma. The strongest was an 800–900 yard wide F3 tornado that tracked 11.5 miles near Laverne, injuring three people. The same cell also dropped hail up to the size of grapefruits.

== June ==
There were 216 tornadoes confirmed in the US in June.

=== June 14 ===
An F0 tornadic waterspout (starts as a tornado) reported near Lake Okeechobee, Florida created a surreal nighttime sight of a tornado and lightning while only doing minor damage. A famous photo of the event, which includes a mixture of brown and black color of the tornado accompanied with a lightning strike, was taken by Fred Smith, who was photographing the tornado from his backyard.

== July ==
There were 64 tornadoes confirmed in the US in July, including one in Cass County, Minnesota, on July 5, 1991. This particular tornado started as a waterspout, came ashore and destroyed a dock, uprooted trees and overturned a boat. This tornado was also featured on some tornado-themed documentaries.

=== July 2 (Philippines) ===
An EF2 tornado struck eleven villages in Lantapan, Bukidnon where it destroyed infrastructures and agricultural crops which costed 2.37 million and 5.9 in damages respectively, leading to the municipality declaring a state of public calamity.

== August ==
There were 46 tornadoes confirmed in the US in August.

=== August 12 (Philippines) ===
A tornado struck Lubang, Occidental Mindoro where it destroyed 10 houses, damaged 20 others, and killed a person.

=== August 16 (Philippines) ===
A tornado struck four villages in Cabanglasan, Bukidnon where it flattened houses and uprooted trees which amounted to at least $37,000 (approximately ₱1 million) worth of damages to property. It killed 6 people and left 15 people missing.

== September ==
There were 26 tornadoes confirmed in the US in September.

=== September 30 (Brazil) ===
A violent F4 tornado struck the municipalities of Itu and Salto, causing catastrophic widespread damage, throwing various cars hundred of yards away and a 22-ton bus was hurled 30 metres (33 yd) away, resulting in the death of at least 9 people, the tornado completely destroyed an approximately 100-ton 6-metre-high obelisk and completely destroyed several houses including the San Raphael Hotel. The tornado caused 2 million dollars in damage and would cause sixteen fatalities and approximately 350 injuries, where nine of the sixteen fatalities would occur when the bus was thrown.

== October ==
There were 21 tornadoes confirmed in the US in October.

== November ==
There were 20 tornadoes confirmed in the US in November.

=== November 29 ===
An F4 tornado tore through areas near Springfield, Missouri, killing two people.

== December ==
There were 3 tornadoes confirmed in the US in December.

== See also ==
- Tornado
  - Tornadoes by year
  - Tornado records
  - Tornado climatology
  - Tornado myths
- List of tornado outbreaks
  - List of F5 and EF5 tornadoes
  - List of North American tornadoes and tornado outbreaks
  - List of 21st-century Canadian tornadoes and tornado outbreaks
  - List of European tornadoes and tornado outbreaks
  - List of tornadoes and tornado outbreaks in Asia
  - List of Southern Hemisphere tornadoes and tornado outbreaks
  - List of tornadoes striking downtown areas
- Tornado intensity
  - Fujita scale
  - Enhanced Fujita scale
