= 1991 Great Plains tornado outbreak =

Severe weather events in the central United States in 1991

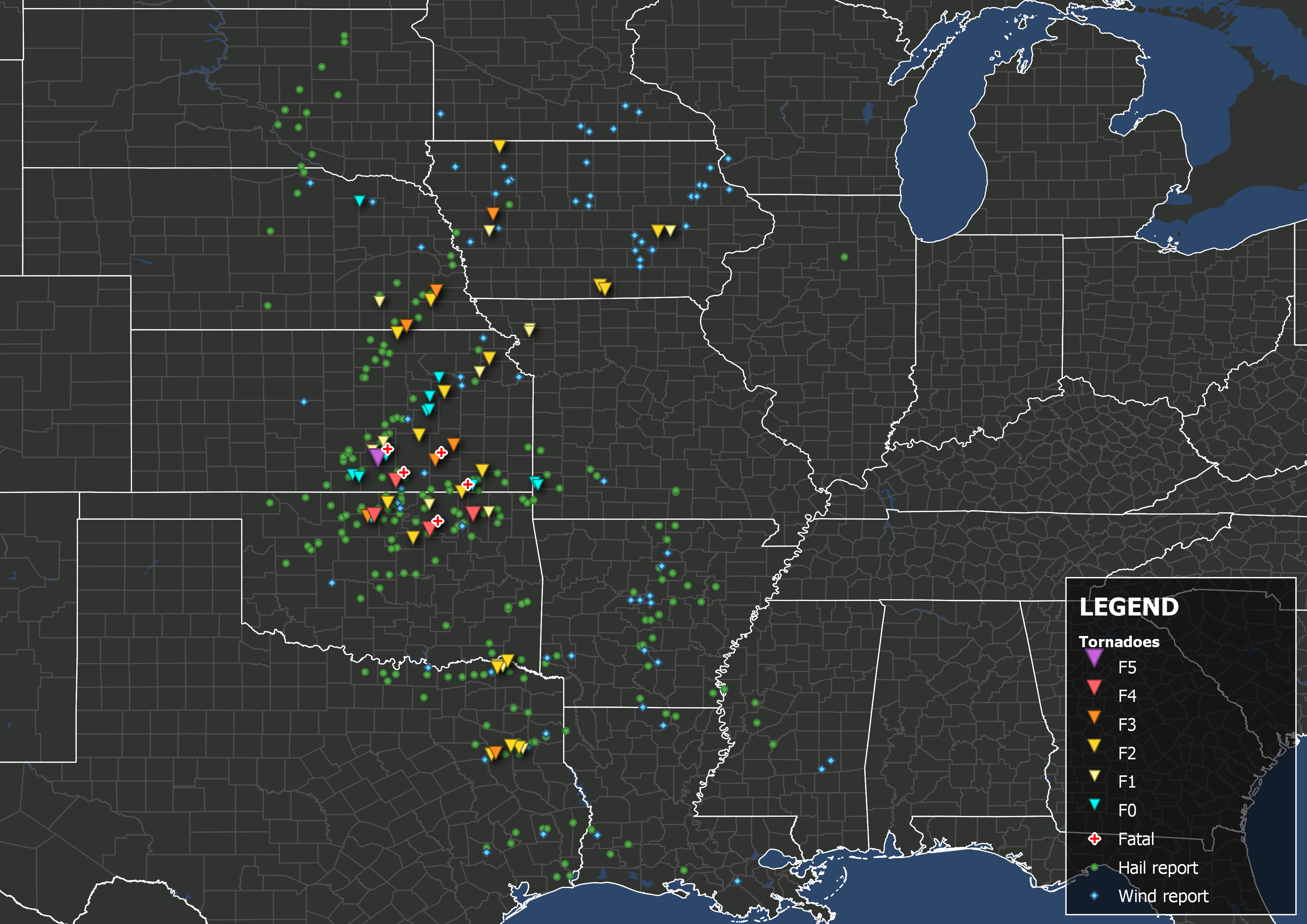
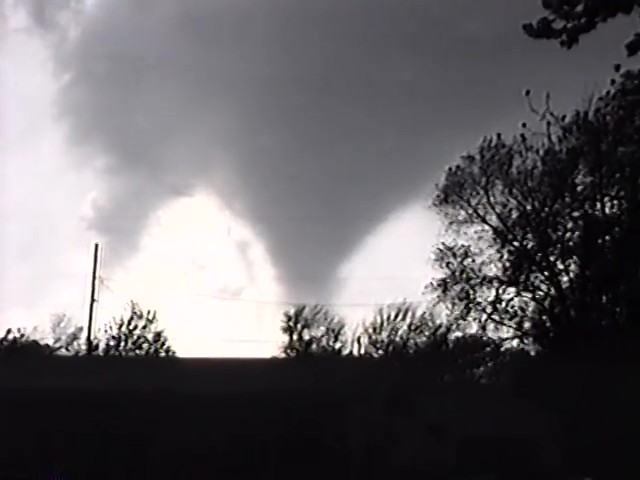
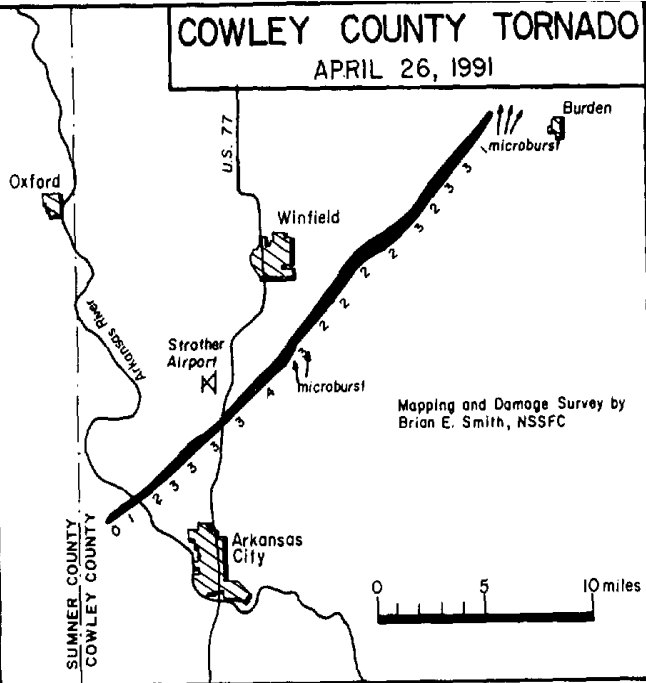
- Clockwise from the top: Storm reports on April 26 and April 27, 1991; track of an F4 tornado that passed in between Arkansas City and Winfield, Kansas on April 26; an intensifying F5 tornado seen in Haysville, Kansas on April 26.

Tornado outbreak
- Tornadoes: 58 confirmed
- Max. rating: F5 tornado
- Duration: April 26–27, 1991
- Highest winds: 261–318 mph (420–512 km/h)(Andover, Kansas F5 on April 26) (Radar measured winds of 286 mph (460 km/h) were recorded by the Red Rock, Oklahoma F4 tornado the same day)
- Highest gusts: 87 knots (100 mph; 161 km/h); Reported in two areas in Iowa,
- Largest hail: 4 inches (100 mm); Reported in two areas in Oklahoma,

Overall effects
- Fatalities: 21
- Injuries: 313
- Damage: $589.6 million, (Note: All losses are in 1991 USD unless otherwise noted.) ($1,393,690,000 in 2025 USD)
- Areas affected: Great Plains region of the United States
- Part of the tornado outbreaks of 1991

From April 26–27, 1991, a large and deadly tornado outbreak affected parts of the Great Plains region of the central United States. On April 26, commonly known as the Great Plains tornado outbreak, nearly five dozen tornadoes occurred primarily across the states of Iowa, Kansas, Nebraska, Oklahoma and Texas. The following day, April 27, featured six tornadoes across Iowa and Texas, but also Georgia and Missouri. This outbreak occurred within a transition period for the National Weather Service and proved the value of Next-Generation weather radars, which were utilized in Oklahoma to provide advanced warning to residents. Primarily in Kansas but also in Oklahoma, 21 people in total were killed by the tornadoes. More than 300 people were injured during the outbreak.

On Friday, April 26, several strong to violent tornadoes, rated from F2 up to F5 on the Fujita scale, swept through the southern and central regions of the Great Plains. The first tornadoes occurred from northern Oklahoma, to southeastern Nebraska, which included two F3 tornadoes that impacted farmsteads in Otoe County, Nebraska; and the small community of Lanham, Kansas and Nebraska. After these initial storms, one cyclic supercell thunderstorm produced a tornado family across southern Kansas, of which one infamous F5 tornado was a part of. This violent tornado tore across parts of Wichita, causing widespread destruction and killing more than a dozen people across the city's metropolitan area, notably the suburb of Andover. There were about 100 or more home videos taken on VHS cameras by residents across the Wichita area during the F5. A notable F2 tornado from the same storm, occurred along the Kansas Turnpike in Butler and Chase Counties, which was recorded by a news crew who sought shelter underneath an overpass, causing a misconception that overpasses can provide adequate shelter during a tornado. In northern Oklahoma, another supercell put down a tornado family, which included two intense F3 and F4 tornadoes that touched down in Garfield County. The latter was observed to have wind speeds of 286 miles per hour (460 km/h) by a University of Oklahoma research team, who were chasing the storm near Red Rock. At the same time the F4 tornado near Red Rock, Oklahoma took place, another violent but lethal F4 tornado developed and moved across Cowley County, Kansas; impacting several homes around Arkansas City and Winfield. Later after dusk, additional strong tornadoes developed in northern Oklahoma. One large F4 tornado struck the Cimarron Turnpike near Westport, flinging vehicles around and killing one person, before the storm moved into the town and caused major damage from there, and in areas in the vicinity of Skiatook. The parent storm that was responsible for the prior F4 tornado in Westport, cycled and put down yet another violent but shorter lived F4 tornado just outside of Oologah, which became the costliest and most destructive tornado in Oklahoma of the outbreak as it went through the city's northern side.

The second day, Saturday, April 27, only featured half a dozen tornadoes in Georgia, Iowa, Missouri and Texas. The strongest was an F2 tornado that impacted near Victor, Iowa; causing considerable damage to some farmsteads in the region. After these tornadoes, the outbreak came to an end.

== Meteorological synopsis ==
=== Episode narrative ===
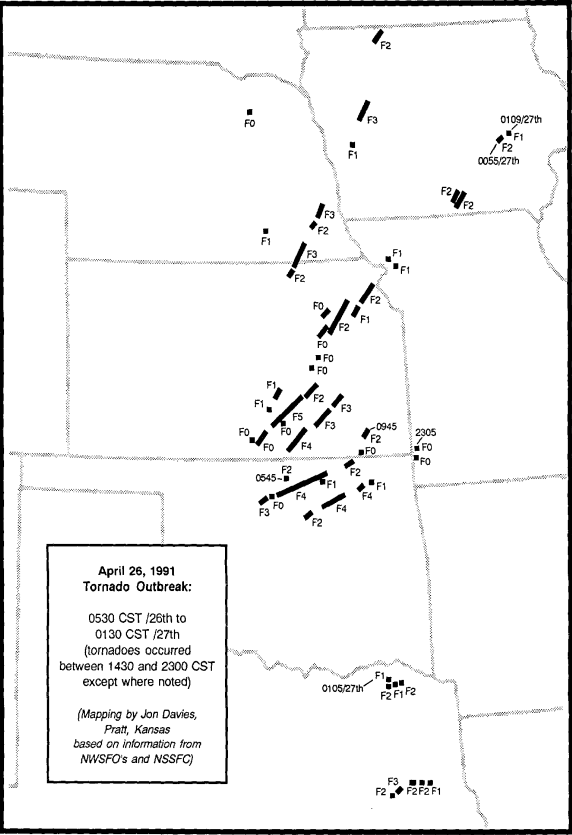
A map of the tornado outbreak that occurred from Texas to Iowa.

On April 25, 1991, the National Weather Service issued a warning of an impending weather system, noting that computer models were "indicating this to be a very significant severe weather producer with tornadoes occurring across the Central/Southern Plains." On the morning of April 26, the organization delineated a High risk of severe weather across the Great Plains. A southeast-tilted trough existed across the southwestern United States that morning, and a distinct jet streak, or a region of enhanced winds at the base of the trough, on the order of 75–85 kn (85–100 mph; 140–155 km/h) was progressing northeast toward the Plains. Through the morning, an 850 mb or approximately 5,000 ft (1,525 m) low-level jet of up to 60 kn (70 mph; 110 km/h) overspread regions from south-central Kansas northward into eastern Nebraska. A surface low-pressure area existed over southwestern Nebraska, supporting a dry line southward into Texas and a warm front southeastward across eastern sections of Kansas and Oklahoma.

=== Event narrative ===
Radar animation of supercell thunderstorms across Kansas and Oklahoma.

In the unstable atmosphere between those two boundaries, surface dewpoints rose above 60 °F (15 °C). Abundant sunshine contributed to destabilization as lifted indices topped -12 from central Oklahoma into central Kansas and convective available potential energy reached 4,000 J/kg. A minimal capping inversion existed across Oklahoma even during the morning, and tornado-producing storms first developed across western Oklahoma around sunrise. These storms weakened as they moved northeast into Kansas. Back to the west, the dryline progressed rapidly eastward but began to slow precipitously during the afternoon. Attempts at thunderstorm development along this feature initially failed. At 17:10 UTC (12:20 p.m. CDT), the National Weather Service issued a particularly dangerous situation tornado watch, warning of the potential for multiple strong to violent tornadoes. This would be one of 24 convective watches issued during the day. Despite early failure at convective initiation, supercell thunderstorms rapidly erupted along the dryline during the afternoon as the jet streak propagated into the Great Plains, resulting in a regional outbreak of tornadoes stretching from Texas to Iowa. Violent tornadoes were concentrated in southern Kansas and northern Oklahoma, although intense tornadoes were also observed in Iowa, Texas, and Nebraska.

== Confirmed tornadoes ==
Confirmed tornadoes by Fujita rating
FU	F0	F1	F2	F3	F4	F5	Total
0	12	16	18	7	4	1	58

=== April 26 event ===
List of confirmed tornadoes – Friday, April 26, 1991 (Note: All dates are based on the local time zone where the tornado touched down; however, all times are in Coordinated Universal Time and dates are split at midnight CST/CDT for consistency.)
F#	Location	County / Parish	State	Start coord.	Time (UTC)	Path Length	Max. width
F2	Tonkawa	Kay	OK	36.68°N 97.30°W	11:45	1 mi (1.6 km)	100 yd (91 m)
F2	Two homes sustained severe roof damage, one from tornadic winds and the other from a fallen tree. Fifteen other houses sustained lesser damage. Greenhouses were damaged at a garden center.						
F1	W of Grand Isle	Jefferson	LA	29.25°N 90.00°W	15:30	0.2 mi (0.32 km)	10 yd (9.1 m)
F1	No information is available on this tornado.						
F2	Cherryvale	Montgomery	KS	37.27°N 95.55°W	15:45	6 mi (9.7 km)	100 yd (91 m)
F2	A large building at a nursery/greenhouse complex was destroyed.						
F2	NW of Washington	Washington	KS	39.82°N 97.12°W	20:25	3.5 mi (5.6 km)	100 yd (91 m)
F2	Several farmhouses were destroyed to the northwest of Washington, resulting in the deaths of several hogs. Some damage occurred in the town of Lanham. Six people were injured.						
F1	Ohiowa	Fillmore	NE	40.42°N 97.45°W	20:40–20:45	1 mi (1.6 km)	50 yd (46 m)
F1	Four grain trailers and a grain truck were flipped over. A satellite dish, a barn door, and a separate barn were destroyed. Trees were extensively damaged.						
F0	N of Strong City	Chase	KS	38.43°N 96.53°W	20:45	1 mi (1.6 km)	17 yd (16 m)
F0	A few farm sheds were damaged.						
F3	SE of Hollenberg, KS to Lanham, KS & NE to S of Beatrice, NE	Washington (KS), Gage (NE)	KS, NE	39.95°N 96.95°W	20:50–21:40	24 mi (39 km)	200 yd (180 m)
F3	This tornado first touched down in Kansas before moving into Nebraska, where the border community of Lanham sustained considerable damage. Farms sustained heavy damage near Odell, and several homes were destroyed south of Beatrice before the tornado dissipated.						
F0	NE of Council Grove	Morris, Wabaunsee	KS	38.67°N 96.52°W	21:10	13 mi (21 km)	50 yd (46 m)
F0	A weak tornado caused damage to trees, fences, several power poles, and a cabin.						
F2	N of Bushong to NE of Grove	Wabaunsee, Shawnee, Jackson	KS	38.73°N 96.25°W	21:35	44 mi (71 km)	200 yd (180 m)
F2	In Waubaunsee County, a farmhouse and some other structures were destroyed. An old stone church was damaged. In Shawnee County, the roofs and windows of several houses were damaged in western Rossville. The tornado rapidly weakened in Jackson County.						
F2	E of Adams	Gage	NE	40.43°N 96.50°W	22:00–22:15	4 mi (6.4 km)	150 yd (140 m)
F2	In conjunction with the Lanham, Kansas and Nebraska F3 tornado, a strong tornado damaged up to 25 farmsteads, including 100 buildings and 30 pieces of large farm equipment.						
F3	NW of Douglas to NE of Palmyra	Otoe	NE	40.60°N 96.40°W	22:15–22:40	14 mi (23 km)	350 yd (320 m)
F3	Four farms were destroyed and three others were severely damaged. Thirteen houses were damaged as well. Two people were injured.						
F0	NE of Anthony	Harper	KS	37.22°N 97.95°W	22:20	1 mi (1.6 km)	50 yd (46 m)
F0	Part of a roof was torn off.						
F0	SE of Freeport to NE of Conway Springs	Harper, Sumner	KS	37.18°N 97.83°W	22:30	16 mi (26 km)	500 yd (460 m)
F0	A weak tornado skipped across open fields across Harper and Sumner Counties.						
F1	Goddard	Sedgwick	KS	37.67°N 97.58°W	22:47	2 mi (3.2 km)	50 yd (46 m)
F1	A boat dealership sustained major damage in Goddard.						
F5	SE of Clearwater to Andover to NE of El Dorado Lake	Sedgwick, Butler	KS	37.47°N 97.48°W	22:49–00:14	46 mi (74 km)	700 yd (640 m)
F5	17 deaths – See article on this tornado – 225 people were injured.						
F3	S of Breckinridge	Garfield	OK	36.43°N 97.67°W	23:00–23:09	6 mi (9.7 km)	350 yd (320 m)
F3	Two homes were destroyed. A pickup truck was rolled 150 yards (140 m) and demolished as well.						
F1	Valley Center to S of Putnam	Sedgwick, Harvey	KS	37.83°N 97.38°W	23:10	16 mi (26 km)	50 yd (46 m)
F1	No damage information is available for this tornado.						
F0	SW of Plainview	Pierce	NE	42.28°N 97.82°W	23:15	0.1 mi (0.16 km)	20 yd (18 m)
F0	A tornado briefly touched down in an open field.						
F0	W of Garber	Garfield	OK	36.43°N 97.60°W	23:15	0.1 mi (0.16 km)	20 yd (18 m)
F0	A weak, brief tornado caused only minor damage.						
F4	E of Garber to N of Red Rock to NW of Pawhuska	Garfield, Noble, Osage	OK	36.43°N 97.55°W	23:30–00:55	66 mi (106 km)	1,500 yd (1,400 m)
F4	See section on this tornado – Six people were injured.						
F4	WNW of Arkansas City to S of Winfield to W of Burden	Cowley	KS	37.07°N 97.15°W	23:30	25 mi (40 km)	1,320 yd (1,210 m)
F4	1 death – See section on this tornado.						
F0	W of Alma to N of Paxico	Wabaunsee	KS	39.02°N 96.35°W	23:35	9 mi (14 km)	20 yd (18 m)
F0	Trees were damaged.						
F2	Reese	Cherokee	TX	32.02°N 95.38°W	00:00–00:01	0.2 mi (0.32 km)	10 yd (9.1 m)
F2	Four houses and two manufactured homes were destroyed, the roofs of additional structures were damaged, trees were uprooted, and television antennas were toppled.						
F2	NE of El Dorado to E of Cassoday to E of Matfield Green	Butler, Chase	KS	37.93°N 96.72°W	00:10	21 mi (34 km)	100 yd (91 m)
F2	See section on this tornado – Four people were injured.						
F3	S of Mount Selman	Cherokee	TX	32.05°N 95.30°W	00:11–00:16	3 mi (4.8 km)	200 yd (180 m)
F3	An intense tornado destroyed three manufactured homes, two houses, and one vehicle. An additional 25 houses were damaged, and trees were uprooted. Numerous power lines, street signs, and television antennas were blown over. One person was injured.						
F3	W of Howard to Severy	Elk, Greenwood	KS	37.47°N 96.42°W	00:26	14 mi (23 km)	200 yd (180 m)
F3	1 death – A significant tornado leveled a manufactured home and caused additional damage to homes, outbuildings, fences, and power lines. A woman was killed and her husband seriously injured in the destroyed house.						
F2	NW of Cushing to NW of Yale	Payne	OK	36.03°N 96.83°W	00:38–00:47	6.5 mi (10.5 km)	800 yd (730 m)
F2	This large tornado rolled a dump truck 200 yards (180 m), destroyed a metal shop building and a well-built barn, and caused roof damage to two homes. Trees and power lines were toppled as well.						
F0	NE of Elmdale	Chase	KS	38.40°N 96.58°W	00:40	1 mi (1.6 km)	50 yd (46 m)
F0	A farm shed was destroyed.						
F2	S of Turnertown	Smith, Rusk	TX	32.18°N 95.02°W	00:40–00:50	3 mi (4.8 km)	100 yd (91 m)
F2	Several trees were uprooted.						
F1	NW of Westphalia	Shelby	IA	41.73°N 95.42°W	00:44–00:47	2 mi (3.2 km)	45 yd (41 m)
F1	No damage information is available.						
F2	Henderson	Rusk	TX	32.15°N 94.87°W	01:00–01:01	0.2 mi (0.32 km)	10 yd (9.1 m)
F2	A barn and outbuildings were destroyed.						
F3	Denison to Wall Lake	Crawford, Sac	IA	42.02°N 95.35°W	01:00–01:17	23 mi (37 km)	150 yd (140 m)
F3	Several farmsteads were damaged or destroyed. Windows were blown out a house, a tractor-semitrailer truck was overturned, and a pig was killed.						
F4	SW of Terlton to Westport to NW of Skiatook	Pawnee, Osage	OK	36.17°N 96.52°W	01:10–01:27	32 mi (51 km)	1,700 yd (1,600 m)
F4	1 death – See section on this tornado – 24 people were injured.						
F1	Henderson	Rusk	TX	32.15°N 94.80°W	01:22–01:23	0.2 mi (0.32 km)	10 yd (9.1 m)
F1	Several trees were snapped or uprooted.						
F1	Osage Nation	Osage	OK	36.67°N 96.53°W	01:27	0.25 mi (0.40 km)	10 yd (9.1 m)
F1	A rope-shaped tornado picked up a car and tossed it 50 feet (15 m). Additional damage occurred to houses and manufactured homes.						
F0	SW of Derby	Sedgwick	KS	37.58°N 97.33°W	01:33	1 mi (1.6 km)	50 yd (46 m)
F0	Several outbuildings were damaged.						
F3	W of Neal to SE of Virgil	Greenwood, Woodson	KS	37.75°N 96.08°W	01:35	15 mi (24 km)	50 yd (46 m)
F3	Several houses and other buildings were destroyed. At least 26 power poles were snapped. Trucks and equipment at a rock quarry were severely damaged, and a 35,000–40,000 pounds (16,000–18,000 kg) fuel truck was moved 75 yards (69 m). A farmhouse was lifted, rotated 90 degrees, and set back down. Two tractor-semitrailers were demolished, and fences were downed as well.						
F1	SW of Meriden to SE of Rock Creek	Shawnee, Jefferson	KS	39.12°N 95.60°W	01:54	11 mi (18 km)	100 yd (91 m)
F1	A tornado formed just north of the local National Weather Service office. It destroyed a manufactured home, resulting in four injuries. It also damaged a power substation, trees, and power lines.						
F2	SW of Milford	Dickinson	IA	43.27°N 95.23°W	02:00–02:30	18 mi (29 km)	60 yd (55 m)
F2	Serious damage occurred to both the farm buildings and farmhouses on two farmsteads.						
F2	E of Copan	Washington	OK	36.88°N 95.93°W	02:05–02:20	6 mi (9.7 km)	100 yd (91 m)
F2	1 death – A strong tornado destroyed a convenience store and a bait shop. Other buildings and trees were damaged too. It tossed a car with two women inside 250 yards (230 m) into a field, killing the passenger and critically injuring the driver. Nine other people were injured in Copan.						
F2	E of Valley Falls to SW of Doniphan	Jefferson, Atchison	KS	39.35°N 95.42°W	02:25	25 mi (40 km)	100 yd (91 m)
F2	A strong tornado caused severe damage in the Nortonville area, with 13 homes destroyed. A nursing home and several businesses sustained major damage as well. In Atchison County, a grain elevator was damaged and outbuildings were destroyed. Trees were uprooted along the tornado's path.						
F4	W of Oologah to W of Oologah Lake	Rogers	OK	36.45°N 95.72°W	02:45–02:55	4 mi (6.4 km)	1,300 yd (1,200 m)
F4	See section on this tornado – 22 people were injured.						
F2	S of Detroit	Red River	TX	33.63°N 95.27°W	03:00–03:01	0.2 mi (0.32 km)	10 yd (9.1 m)
F2	Two manufactured homes and a barn were destroyed. Several homes and two automobiles sustained damage. Trees were uprooted.						
F1	Chelsea	Rogers	OK	36.53°N 95.43°W	03:10–03:14	2 mi (3.2 km)	30 yd (27 m)
F1	A rope-like and brief tornado destroyed two houses and two manufactured homes in northwestern Chelsea. Three people suffered minor injuries.						
F1	Helena	Andrew	MO	39.92°N 94.67°W	03:15	1.8 mi (2.9 km)	50 yd (46 m)
F1	Power lines and trees were downed along an intermittent path.						
F1	NW of Bagwell	Red River	TX	33.67°N 95.17°W	03:19–03:20	0.2 mi (0.32 km)	10 yd (9.1 m)
F1	Trees were uprooted, and a bridge was damaged.						
F0	SW of Dearing	Montgomery	KS	37.03°N 95.73°W	03:20	1 mi (1.6 km)	50 yd (46 m)
F0	A brief tornado damaged a building.						
F2	SW of Negley	Red River	TX	33.75°N 95.08°W	03:30–03:31	0.2 mi (0.32 km)	10 yd (9.1 m)
F2	A barn was destroyed, a manufactured home was overturned, and several homes were damaged. Numerous trees were uprooted as well.						
F2	Allerton to Millerton	Wayne	IA	40.70°N 93.37°W	04:10–04:22	9 mi (14 km)	60 yd (55 m)
F2	Two tornadoes in Wayne County collectively damaged 25 farmsteads and residences.						
F2	SE of Sewal to SE of Confidence	Wayne	IA	40.63°N 93.28°W	04:10–04:28	15 mi (24 km)	75 yd (69 m)
F2	Two tornadoes in Wayne County collectively damaged 25 farmsteads and residences. A manufactured home was destroyed, and two people were injured.						
F0	S of Joplin	Newton	MO	37.03°N 94.52°W	04:39	0.25 mi (0.40 km)	50 yd (46 m)
F0	A possible tornado was reported.						
F1	N of Cosby	Andrew	MO	39.87°N 94.68°W	04:57	1.5 mi (2.4 km)	50 yd (46 m)
F1	Trees and power lines were downed.						

=== April 27 event ===
List of confirmed tornadoes – Saturday, April 27, 1991 (Note: Prior to 1994, only the average widths of tornado paths were officially listed.)
F#	Location	County / Parish	State	Start coord.	Time (UTC)	Path Length	Max. width
F0	W of Joplin	Jasper	MO	37.08°N 94.58°W	05:05	0.1 mi (0.16 km)	10 yd (9.1 m)
F0	No damage information is available.						
F2	SE of Victor	Iowa	IA	41.70°N 92.30°W	06:55–07:04	4.5 mi (7.2 km)	50 yd (46 m)
F2	Two tornadoes in Iowa County caused damage to several farmsteads, farm buildings, and a house.						
F1	N of Detroit	Red River	TX	33.70°N 95.27°W	07:05–07:06	0.2 mi (0.32 km)	10 yd (9.1 m)
F1	The tops were snapped off several large trees.						
F1	S of Marengo	Iowa	IA	41.73°N 92.07°W	07:09	2 mi (3.2 km)	40 yd (37 m)
F1	Two tornadoes in Iowa County caused damage to several farmsteads, farm buildings, and a house.						
F1	NNE of Zaidee	Treutlen	GA	32.38°N 82.52°W	19:00	0.1 mi (0.16 km)	23 yd (21 m)
F1	Brief tornado moved over a farm and damaged structures. Three mobile homes were destroyed, while two others were heavily damaged alongside a fence. One trailer was lifted off its foundation and deposited 40 ft (12 m) away.						
F1	NNW of Warren Springs to NW of Roach	Cass	TX	33.07°N 94.38°W	20:50	3 mi (4.8 km)	220 yd (200 m)
F1	A storm spotter reported a tornado northwest of Linden. Many trees were blown down.						

=== Clearwater–Haysville–Andover–El Dorado, Kansas ===
Clearwater–Haysville–Andover–El Dorado, Kansas
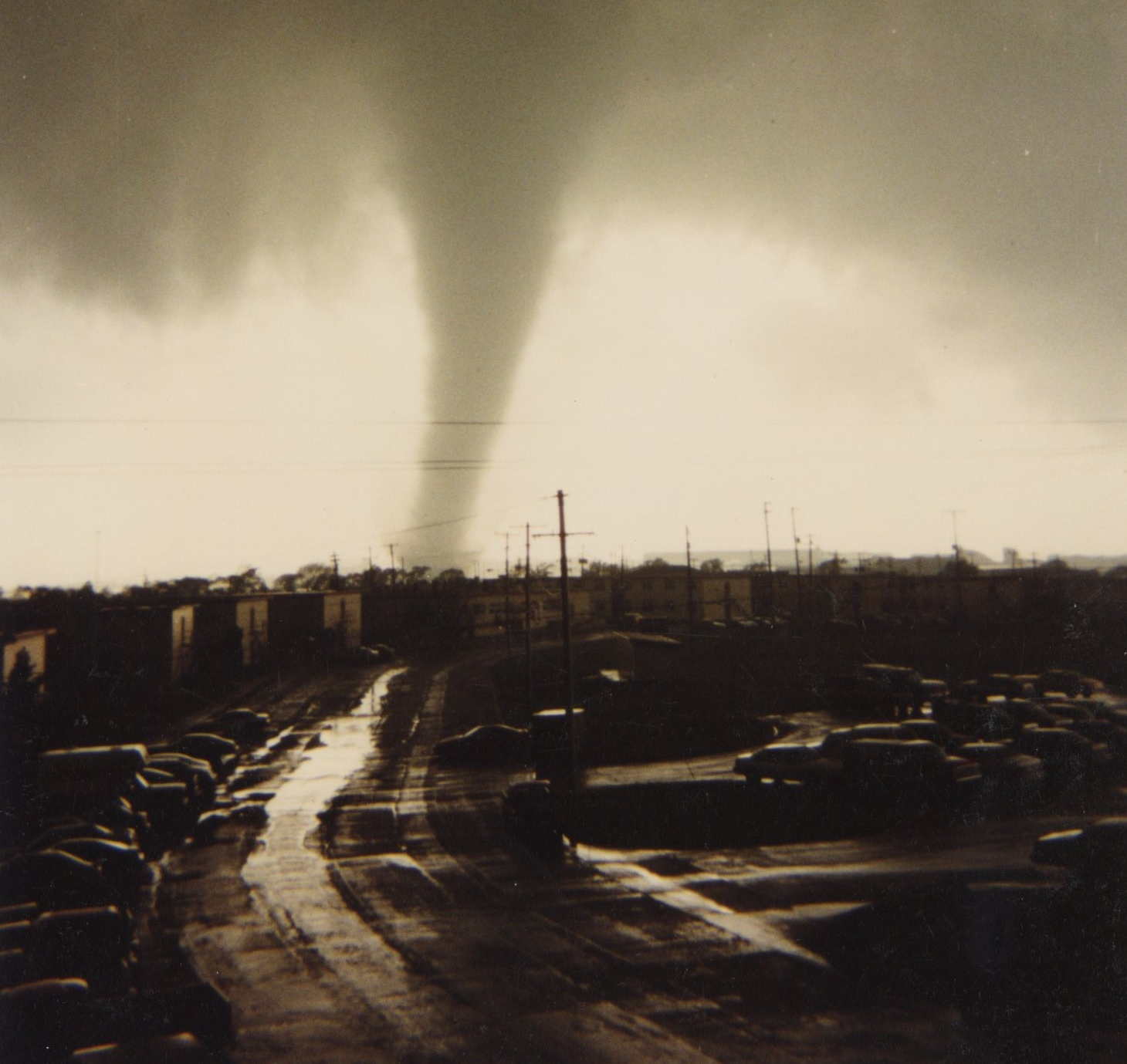
- The tornado as seen from McConnell USAFB.

Meteorological history
- Formed: April 26, 1991, 5:49 p.m. CDT (UTC−05:00)
- Dissipated: April 26, 1991, 7:14 p.m. CDT (UTC−05:00)
- Duration: 1 hour and 25 minutes

F5 tornado
- on the Fujita scale
- Highest winds: 261–318 mph (420–512 km/h)

Overall effects
- Casualties: 17 fatalities, 225 injuries
- Damage: $300 million ($709,140,000 in 2025 USD)

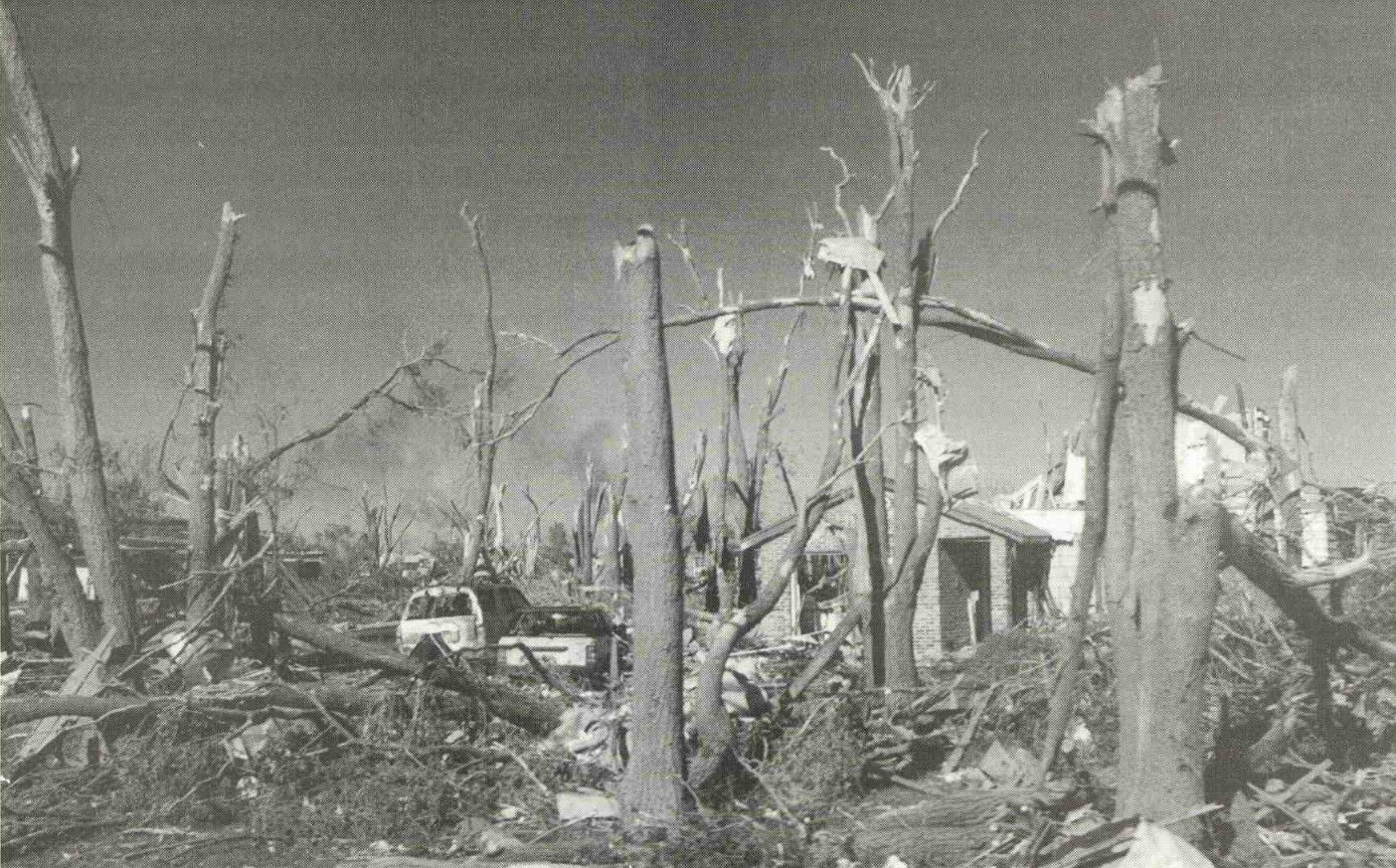
Severe damage to trees from the tornado.

At 5:49 p.m. CDT (22:49 UTC), this deadly and violent tornado began east of Clearwater, in Sedgwick County, Kansas. At 6:05 p.m. CDT (23:05 UTC), the National Weather Service issued a statement urging residents in Haysville, Derby, and Mulvane to seek shelter. This was succeeded by a tornado warning four minutes later. Around 6:16 p.m. CDT (23:16 UTC), the intensifying tornado began to affect southeastern sections of Wichita and directly struck Haysville. It produced strong F2 to F3 damage in Haysville while growing to a width of about 220 yards (200 m) and acquiring multiple-vortex characteristics. The tornado crossed the Kansas Turnpike about 0.5 miles (0.80 km) south of the South Wichita Interchange. In eastern Wichita, some well-built houses in the Greenwich Heights Subdivision were completely leveled, indicative of strong F3 to F4 damage. Four people were killed at this location. At 6:24 p.m. CDT (23:24 UTC), the violent tornado struck the McConnell Air Force Base, where it narrowly missed a lineup of 10 B-1B bombers each worth $280 million and two of which were equipped with nuclear warheads. Nine major facilities on the base were destroyed, including the officer's club, base hospital, library, and elementary school. In addition, 102 housing units were demolished. No fatalities were recorded there, though 16 people were injured and total losses reached $62 million. As the tornado continued to move toward US 54 in the direction of Andover, it prompted forecasters to issue a heightened tornado warning alerting residents in Augusta and Andover that a damaging tornado was approaching. Despite this warning, the tornado sirens in Andover failed.

At 6:31 p.m. CDT (23:31 UTC), with the sirens not functional, the police drove through the Golden Spur Mobile Home Park and through the town warning residents to seek shelter. 10 minutes later, the now large wedge-stovepipe hybrid tornado entered southern Andover and began to impact the mobile home park, which ultimately sustained a direct hit. Of the 244 manufactured homes, 205, or about 84 percent of them, were destroyed. Post-storm interviews by health officials found that 339 residents were home during the tornado, of which 146 evacuated, 149 sought refuge in the community shelter, and 38 remained in their homes. No casualties occurred among individuals who fled or utilized the shelter. However, 13 people were killed, another 17 were hospitalized, and nine sustained minor injuries among the group who remained in their structures. Additional homes were swept from their foundations to the west of this park, where the Andover tornado earned its F5 rating. Throughout the city, over 1,500 residences were devastated. The tornado continued northeast, affecting the outskirts of Towanda. Twenty minutes later, the violent tornado dissipated north-northwest of El Dorado and north of the Kansas Turnpike, though the parent supercell later produced additional tornadoes further across Butler County. Along the tornado's path, 84 frame houses and 14 businesses were leveled. A total of 225 people were injured. It was the final Kansas tornado to be given an F5 rating prior to the implementation of the Enhanced Fujita Scale, which was principally used on the Greensburg EF5 tornado on May 4, 2007.

=== Garber–Billings–Red Rock–Pawhuska, Oklahoma ===
Garber–Billings–Red Rock–Pawhuska, Oklahoma
- A photo of the tornado taken southeast by Alan Moller approaching I-35 near Ceres.

Meteorological history
- Formed: April 26, 1991, 6:30 p.m. CDT (UTC−05:00)
- Dissipated: April 26, 1991, 7:55 p.m. CDT (UTC−05:00)
- Duration: 1 hour and 25 minutes

F4 tornado
- on the Fujita scale
- Highest winds: Official intensity: 207–260 mph (333–418 km/h); Radar estimated: 286 mph (460 km/h) (Measurement by University of Oklahoma mobile radar)

Overall effects
- Casualties: 6 injuries
- Damage: $500,000 ($1,180,000 in 2025 USD)

While the Andover F5 and several other tornadoes in Kansas and Nebraska were ongoing, supercell thunderstorm complexes produced tornadoes in northern Oklahoma. In Garfield County, the National Weather Service office in Norman, Oklahoma issued a tornado warning at 6:27 p.m. CDT (23:27 UTC) for the entire region. Three minutes later, a large and violent tornado touched down approximately 2.5 miles (4.0 km) east of Garber, at 6:30 p.m. CDT (23:30 UTC). This tornado was the third in its family, following the dissipation of an F3 tornado that occurred south of Breckinridge or east of Enid, and a brief F0 tornado that occurred in the area.

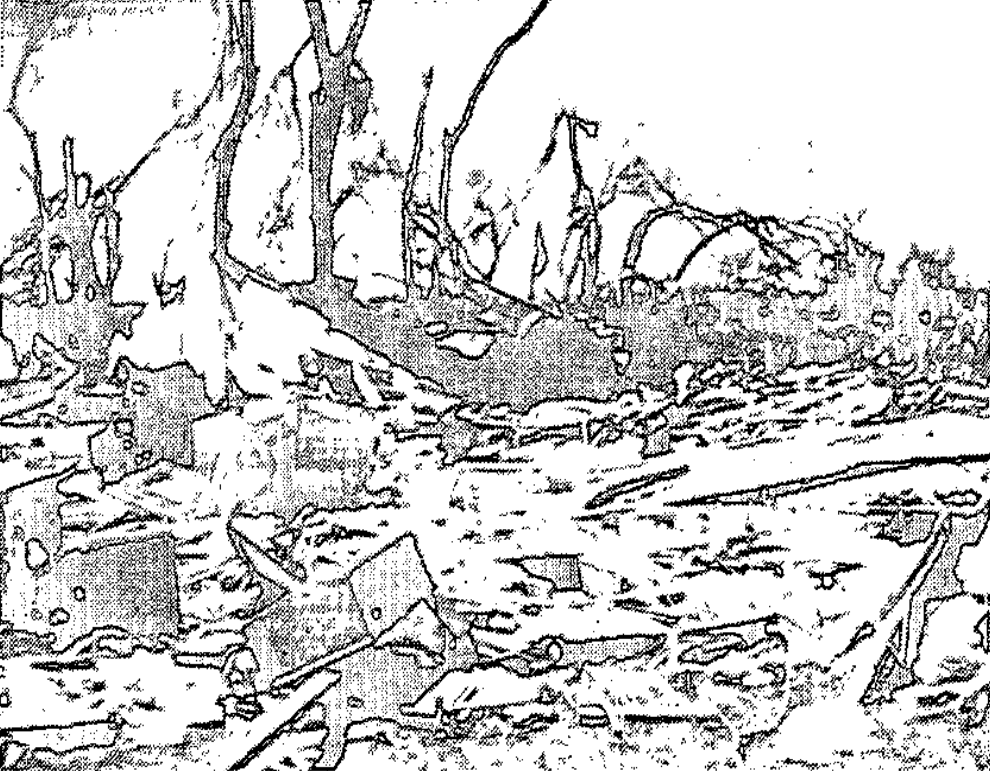
A house destroyed near Garber.

Tracking east-northeast of Garber and east of the Garfield–Noble County border, after crossing over into the neighboring county at 6:38 p.m. CDT (23:38 UTC), the tornado impacted a residence around 4.5 miles (7.2 km) south of Billings, inflicting F3 damage to a house. In the vicinity, the tornado as well destroyed some oil tanks, toppled well pumps, and snapped power poles as its width increased to 0.5 miles (880 yd; 0.80 km). Continuing on its east-northeastern trajectory, the tornado grew in both intensity and size as it moved 5 miles (8.0 km) southeast of Billings, attaining violent intensity and growing up to 0.75 miles (1,320 yd; 1.21 km) wide. Located west of Interstate 35 at this point, the violent tornado caused F4 damage to a property, obliterating the home and debarking numerous trees. The tornado persisted across Noble County, passing between Marland and the Otoe Indian Agency and causing damage to two farmsteads in its wake.

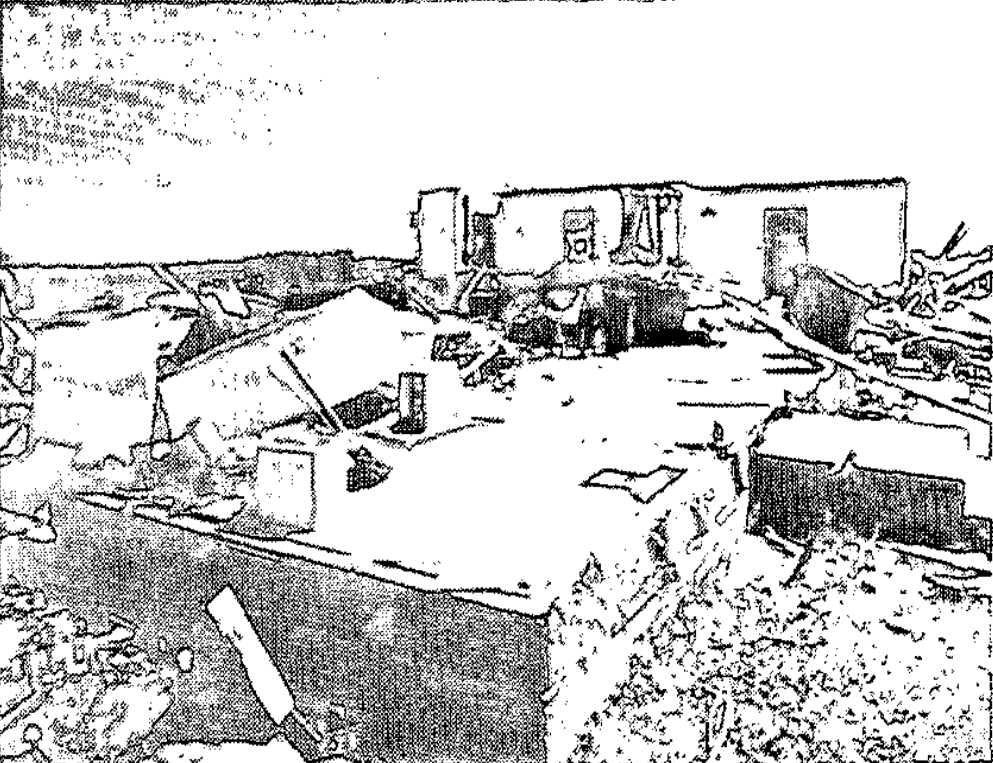
Damage inflicted to a home west of I-35.

To the north of Red Rock simultaneously, a storm chasing research team from the University of Oklahoma (OU), led by Dr. Howard Bluestein, used a portable Doppler weather radar during their deployment and observation of the storm on US 77, around 2 miles (3.2 km) north of OK 15 as the tornado passed over the highway. Their radar, located south of the tornado, recorded maximum estimated winds ranging from 120–125 metres per second (270–280 mph; 430–450 km/h) at the top of the funnel. According to the Oklahoma Mesonet, winds possibly reached as high as 286 miles per hour (460 km/h). This extreme wind speed observation by the OU research team suggested probable F5-level winds at the surface. This was both the first ever instance of F5 winds to be measured by a radar, and also at the time, the highest observed wind measurement taken of a tornado ever recorded, until an F5 tornado that struck central Oklahoma over 8 years later surpassed the record. The tornado afterwards, entered Osage County at 7:21 p.m. CDT (00:21 UTC), dropping in strength from F4 to F3 intensity before it moved north of Fairfax. Nearby, the tornado uprooted many trees, and caused intense damage to one house in the area. As the tornado was 10 miles (16 km) west of Pawhuska, the storm struck a large oil rig, which with its 18 in (46 cm) foundation, was toppled over. After being on the ground for around 35 minutes since entering Osage County earlier, the tornado dissipated 9 miles (14 km) west-northwest of Pawhuska, at 7:55 p.m. CDT (00:55 UTC). Along its path, the tornado reportedly scoured and blew away parts of several county roads.

This large and extremely violent tornado was one of several twisters across Oklahoma that were spawned by a cyclic supercell, occurring at the same time another F4 tornado formed over in southern Kansas. Dubbed the Red Rock tornado, it was the longest tracked and second largest tornado of the entire outbreak, traversing a path 66 miles (106 km) long across Garfield, Noble and Osage Counties, with a maximum width of 1,500 yards (0.85 mi; 1,400 m) wide, placing it behind another F4 tornado that struck in Pawnee County, Oklahoma. The Red Rock tornado largely avoided any populated areas, impacting a few structures on rural properties and farmsteads, which garnered it its F4 rating as acknowledged by the National Weather Service office in Norman. Six people were injured, though no fatalities were attributed. The Red Rock tornado was the last violent tornado to take place in Garfield County, until an EF4 tornado struck areas near Enid, Oklahoma almost 35 years later, on April 23, 2026.

=== Arkansas City–Hackney–Winfield, Kansas ===
Arkansas City–Hackney–Winfield, Kansas
- The tornado as seen at its peak width northeast of Winfield.

Meteorological history
- Formed: April 26, 1991, 6:30 p.m. CDT (UTC−05:00)
- Duration: Unknown

F4 tornado
- on the Fujita scale
- Highest winds: 207–260 mph (333–418 km/h)

Overall effects
- Casualties: 1 fatality

This tornado touched down around 5 miles (8.0 km) west-northwest of Arkansas City, Kansas at around 6:30 p.m. CDT. The tornado initially produced only F1 level damage to trees as it crossed the Arkansas River. The tornado intensified to F3 intensity as it approached the community of Hackney and Strother Field airport in rural Cowley County, where the tornado picked up and tossed a grain bin across fields around two miles to the south-southwest, leaving large scratch marks in the ground approximately 0.6 miles (0.97 km) long. As the tornado passed over the Pleasant Valley Cemetery, numerous tombstones were picked up and knocked over before the tornado crossed US 77, around 1.25 miles (2.01 km) south of Strother Field.

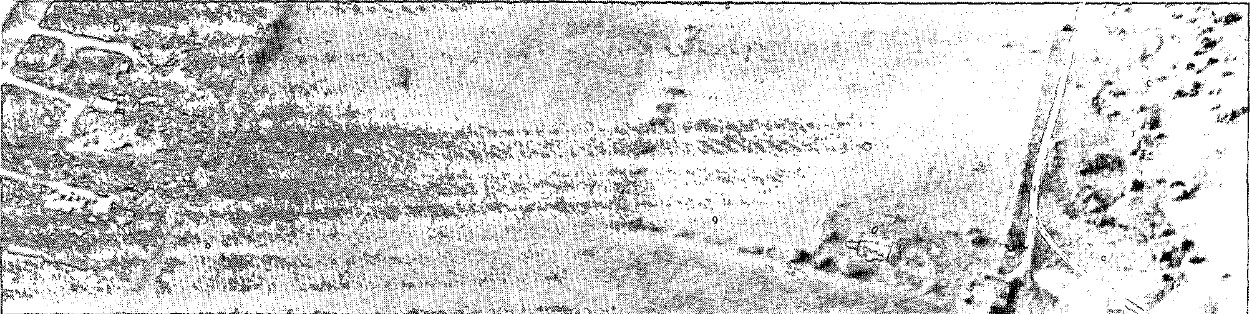
F4 level damage to homes in rural Cowley County.

The tornado continued to widen and intensify as it passed Strother Field to the southeast, before intensifying to F4 strength as it damaged or destroyed several homes around 2 miles (3.2 km) east of the airport. Damage to one home may have been worthy of an F5 rating according to a report in 2001 by Thomas Grazulis. He stated that one home was reportedly damaged so badly that surveyors failed to notice it.

The tornado began to veer to the north before crossing the Walnut River, likely caused by a microburst around 0.5 miles (0.80 km) to the south. The tornado weakened to F2 intensity only producing damage to trees and barns. The tornado widened to its maximum width of 0.4 miles (0.64 km) around four miles west of Winfield, before striking the Frog Hollow Oil Field, where several oil tanks were toppled and rolled up to half a mile away from their starting points. In the same area, the tornado destroyed a mobile home, claiming the life of the occupant despite advanced warning that a tornado was approaching. The tornado mostly produced F2 - F3 level damage to farmsteads for the remainder of its track before lifting around 2.5 miles (4.0 km) west-northwest of Burden. It was noted that a microburst noted near the end of the tornadoes track may have caused the tornado to dissipate.

=== Kansas Turnpike–Cassoday–Matfield Green, Kansas ===
Kansas Turnpike–Cassoday–Matfield Green, Kansas
- A still from the infamous Kansas Turnpike video showing the tornado.

Meteorological history
- Formed: April 26, 1991, 7:10 p.m. CDT (UTC−05:00)
- Dissipated: April 26, 1991, 7:25 p.m. CDT (UTC−05:00)
- Duration: 15 minutes

F2 tornado
- on the Fujita scale
- Highest winds: 113–157 mph (182–253 km/h)

Overall effects
- Casualties: 4 injuries
- Damage: $250,000 ($5,910,000 in 2025 USD)

After causing widespread destruction in Andover, the parent supercell continued northeast and produced another strong tornado. This narrow but significant F2 tornado, which was 100 yards (91 m) wide at its largest, tracked for 21 miles (34 km) across Butler and Chase Counties in Kansas. It paralleled the Kansas Turnpike for many miles before eventually crossing the road south of Cassoday, tossing vehicles up to 75 yards (69 m) away from the turnpike. The tornado later dissipated east of Matfield Green, after being on the ground for at least 15 minutes. The storm gained notoriety when news cameraman Ted Lewis and reporter Gregg Jarrett from NBC-affiliate KSNW-TV in Wichita, sought shelter underneath an overpass on the Kansas Turnpike. Video from the crew shows a minivan several hundred yards down the turnpike being rolled multiple times, with other vehicles such as large semi-trailer trucks overturned and severely damaged as well. Jarrett was awarded the Heartland Emmy Award for his news segment of the tornado. Alongside the 1979 Wichita Falls, Texas F4 tornado, this marked the second prominent example of people seeking refuge from a tornado underneath an overpass. Information from the National Weather Service initially and indirectly contributed to this line of thought as well.

During the 1999 Great Plains tornado outbreak, the consequences of this practice were realized. On May 3, 1999, there were three locations where a highway overpass was utilized as a shelter from approaching tornadoes, and at all three locations there was at least one fatality. One of these, the 1999 Bridge Creek–Moore, Oklahoma F5 tornado, was at violent F4–F5 intensity as it impacted the overpass. One incorrect notion from the Kansas Turnpike video was that the recording news crew was protected by the weaker nature of the tornado as it passed over a primarily rural area, in contrast to the Bridge Creek–Moore tornado. However, another F2 tornado on May 3, 1999; killed one individual, proving that tornadoes of any intensity are capable of killing people harboring under overpasses. In addition to the fatalities, many people who survived these tornadoes nonetheless suffered graphic injuries and sometimes permanent disabilities.

Since the 1991 tornado and events on May 3, 1999; meteorologists have strongly advised people to avoid seeking shelter under highway overpasses for many reasons. One, it exposes individuals to flying debris, which is the number one cause of death in tornadoes. Two, the elevated nature of the overpass subjects people to stronger winds than at ground level. Three, overpasses may act to channel and accelerate the wind. Four, many overpasses do not have girders for individuals to hold onto, such as was the case during the Kansas Turnpike video. Fifth, tornadic winds shift directions as the vortex passes, such that people originally protected from winds will still be exposed to its effects following the wind shift. The National Weather Service therefore notes, "seeking shelter under a highway overpass is to become a stationary target for flying debris, with a substantial risk of being blown out and carried by the tornado winds". Lastly, motorists who quickly park their cars under an overpass without pulling over to the side first can cause an unexpected traffic jam, that may slow/strand other drivers due to the risk of collision.

=== Cimarron Turnpike–Westport–Skiatook, Oklahoma ===
Cimarron Turnpike–Westport–Skiatook, Oklahoma
- The tornado near the Cimarron Turnpike in Pawnee County.

Meteorological history
- Formed: April 26, 1991, 8:10 p.m. CDT (UTC−05:00)
- Dissipated: April 26, 1991, 9:27 p.m. CDT (UTC−05:00)
- Duration: 1 hour and 17 minutes

F4 tornado
- on the Fujita scale
- Highest winds: 207–260 mph (333–418 km/h)

Overall effects
- Casualties: 1 fatality, 24 injuries
- Damage: $3,000,000 ($7,090,000 in 2025 USD)

Following the cycle of an F2 tornado that passed north and west of Cushing and Yale, Oklahoma; the parent thunderstorm complex dropped at 8:10 p.m. CDT (01:10 UTC) a large, and violent tornado 1.5 miles (2.4 km) southwest of Terlton, just north of the Creek−Pawnee County border. The tornado moved east-northeast as it passed by Terlton, missing the town from a direct hit, which previously was hit by one of two other deadly F4 tornadoes that struck the region exactly 7 years prior, on April 26 and 29, 1984. Northeast of the small city and west of OK 48, the tornado remained weak at F0 intensity, causing mainly light tree damage across Pawnee County.

Crossing over OK 48, the tornado intensified further to F1 to F2 strength as it inflicted significant amounts of damage to structures and powerlines, around 0.5 miles (0.80 km) south of the Cimarron Turnpike. The tornado at this point, had a width of 0.125 miles (0.201 km) across. Moving away further away from the highway, the tornado rapidly intensified in both width and intensity, reaching a width of nearly 1 mile (1,800 yd; 1.6 km) and attaining F4 intensity on the turnpike. The now violent tornado swept off several motorists off the road, killing one man as the tornado overturned his car. Nearby, five other people sustained injuries but survived.

At 8:30 p.m. CDT (01:30 UTC) the tornado made its way into Westport, narrowing in width to 400 yards (370 m) wide and striking the Keystone Airpark, maintaining significant intensity as it caused damage to four hangars at that location. Seven aircraft were destroyed, including two that were deposited into nearby trees. The airport's fire station was leveled, with one fire truck that was moved by the tornado beyond the runway and flung into a wooded area 0.25 miles (0.40 km) away. A mile ahead to the east, the storm then entered the Ridgemont Estates area, with violent intensity. The tornado inflicted major F4 damage to houses and the nearby woods. Within Westport, the tornado impacted approximately 94 homes. Of the 94 residential properties that were impacted, 54 were completely demolished, with 8 suffering substantial amounts of destruction, while 32 homes had minor damage. Some 5 mobile homes were impacted as well, alongside several other structures, and approximately 70 vehicles. The community center within Westport also was damaged in the process as the tornado swept through. Despite the impact, the tornado claimed no casualties in the area.

The tornado then crossed Keystone Lake, and into Osage County around 14 minutes later at 8:44 p.m. CDT (01:44 UTC). The tornado reportedly lifted off the ground for a brief time, before consolidating in the vicinity of New Prue and a half-mile southwest of the John Zink Scout Ranch. The tornado afterwards impacted the scout ranch, destroying a lodge where several girl scouts took shelter. None of the scouts themselves were harmed during their encounter with the tornado. Every tree in the storm's path were snapped or uprooted as the track continued northeast, to the extreme southern point of Skiatook Lake. Along the lake, the tornado damaged a marina, where a few boats that were docked were impacted. The tornado persisted and at 9:15 p.m. CDT (02:15 UTC) struck a propane company on OK 20, a mile and a half west of Skiatook. The powerful twister then moved into a subdivision of homes a mile northwest of Skiatook, at this point harboring F3 level winds. Here, the tornado caused destruction to less than 100 houses, as 32 were destroyed and 11 sustained major levels of damage. An estimated 45 homes received minor damage caused by the tornado. The path for a short time, continued further to the northeast until the tornado dissipated at 9:27 p.m. CDT (02:27 UTC). The tornado ended just west of the Osage−Tulsa County border.

The Westport tornado was the largest tornado of the entire outbreak by size, with a maximum width of less than a mile, or 1,700 yards (0.97 mi; 1,600 m) wide when the storm was at the Cimarron Turnpike, along a track 32 miles (51 km) long. It was one of several violent tornadoes to occur during the outbreak, attaining an F4 rating. One man was killed while 24 others were injured, making it one of the more impactful tornadoes of the outbreak. The storm inflicted around $3 million (1991 USD) in damages across its over hour long track. This was the last violent (F4/EF4+) tornado to occur in Osage County, until one deadly EF4 tornado struck the city of Barnsdall over 34 years later, on May 6, 2024.

=== Oologah, Oklahoma ===
Oologah, Oklahoma
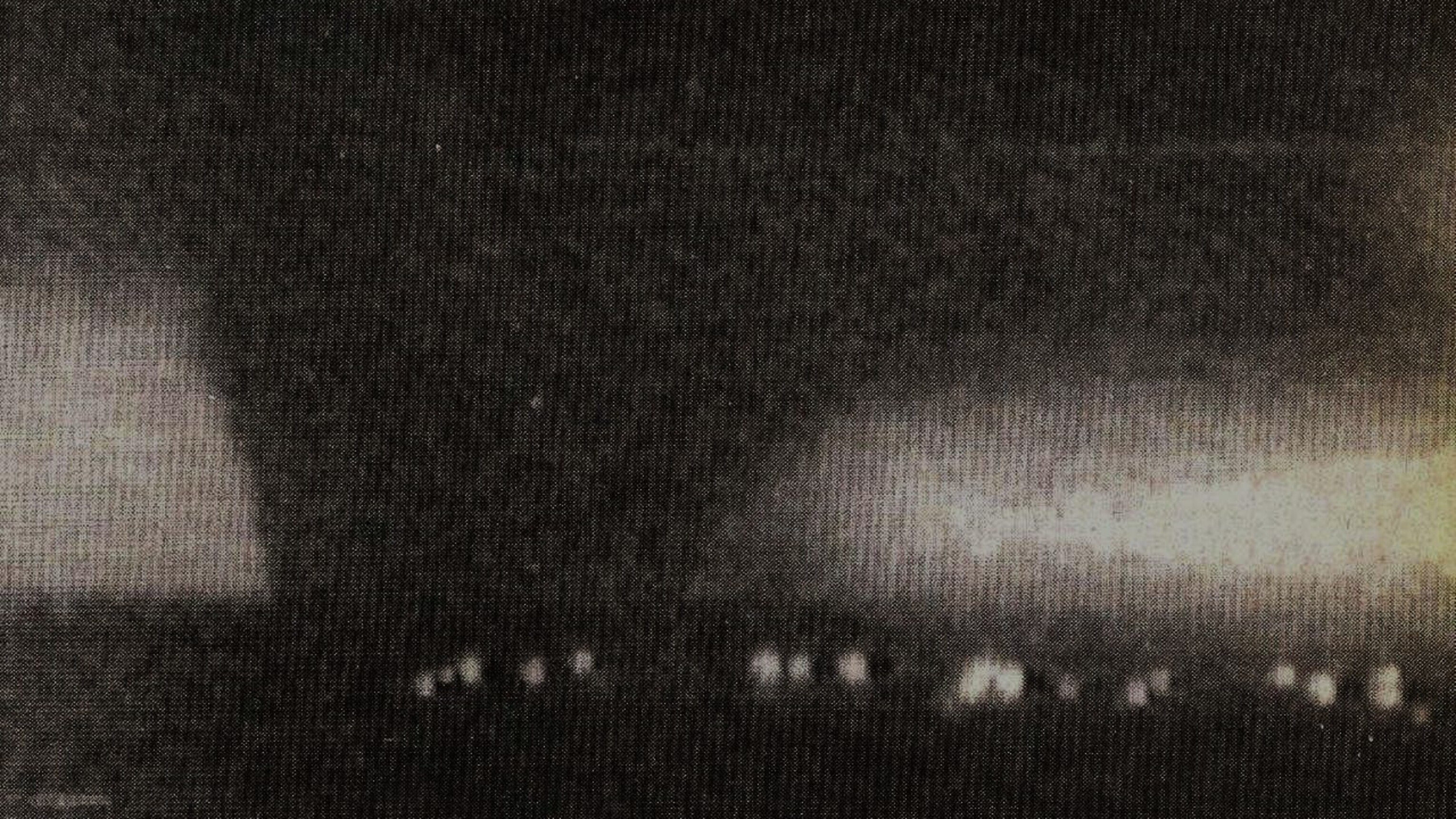
- The nocturnal tornado in Oologah as seen from a power plant security camera.

Meteorological history
- Formed: April 26, 1991, 9:45 p.m. CDT (UTC−05:00)
- Dissipated: April 26, 1991, 9:55 p.m. CDT (UTC−05:00)
- Duration: 10 minutes

F4 tornado
- on the Fujita scale
- Highest winds: 207–260 mph (333–418 km/h)

Overall effects
- Casualties: 22 injuries
- Damage: $15,000,000 ($35,460,000 in 2025 USD)

The supercell which previously produced the Westport tornado cycled, and at 9:45 p.m. CDT (02:45 UTC) produced another violent tornado in Rogers County, Oklahoma; just 1 mile (1.6 km) west of the outskirts of Oologah.

The circulation that developed into this tornado, began southeast of the four-way intersection connecting both South 4090 and East 390 Roads, just on the northwestern part of Oologah. The tornado right after moving northeast, entered the proper city limits, rapidly becoming destructive and causing widespread damage to a subdivision north of downtown.

Around five dozen homes, and 16 trailers were destroyed as the violent tornado went through. The tornado then went further and devastated an area containing sixteen apartment complex buildings and 30 barns on the north side of Oologah. The tornado afterwards then hit the Oologah School Complex, inflicting significant structural damage to K-12 buildings located on the grounds of the complex. Around 22 people were injured during the tornado, though no deaths occurred. The storm left a path around this time that was up to around 0.75 miles (1,320 yd; 1.21 km) wide as it was causing F4 damage in town.

The devastating tornado then exited the north side of Oologah, remaining on the ground for a few minutes as it headed northeast towards Oologah Lake. The tornado would move through Will Rogers State Park and continued on its trajectory, until dissipating at 9:55 p.m. CDT (02:55 UTC) on the western bank of the lake. The Oologah tornado, while not a long-lasting tornado, was the costliest and most destructive event to take place in Oklahoma during the outbreak. Along a track 4 miles (6.4 km) long and 1,300 yards (0.74 mi; 1,200 m) wide, the tornado during its 10-minute lifespan racked up monetary losses upwards of $15 million (1991 USD). Of that amount, approximately $12 million in damages was inflicted to the Oologah K-12 complex.

Beside tornadic events, the parent supercell also brought in damaging winds caused by powerful downbursts, that occurred on the southern flank of the tornado's track. These non-tornadic winds damaged structures in a consistent "starburst" pattern 5 miles (8.0 km) long, from southwest of Oologah to the city itself. Within the community, downburst winds blew trees down and inflicted roof damage. Some houses and mobile homes 1.5 miles (2.4 km) to the southwest, experienced heavier levels of damage. Large transmission towers which supported high tension wiring from the nearby Public Service Company of Oklahoma power station, were collapsed. All the towers within a mile-long stretch were blown down toward the east-southeast.

== Aftermath ==
=== Regional impact and response ===
Outbreak death toll
State	Total	County	County total
Kansas	19	Butler	13
Kansas	19	Cowley	1
Kansas	19	Elk	1
Kansas	19	Sedgwick	4
Oklahoma	2	Pawnee	1
Oklahoma	2	Washington	1
Totals	21		
All deaths were tornado-related

In the wake of the tornado outbreak, Kansas state governor Joan Finney requested that U.S. President George H.W. Bush supply Sedgwick, Butler, and Cowley Counties with federal disaster aid, a move that the president later approved. Under the $2.6 million program, the Federal Emergency Management Agency (FEMA) paid 75 percent of the cost for disaster cleanup, while the local government paid 15 percent, and the state paid the remaining 10 percent. Oklahoma state governor David Walters likewise requested federal assistance for six counties in his state. American Red Cross and civil defense officials scoured devastated homes and rendered aid to about 370 families affected by the storms. After two Oklahoma counties were not granted disaster assistance, local officials in Garfield and Washington Counties criticized FEMA's decision. The organization responded by noting that additional counties could be added to the list in the future but that damage in those counties was marginal for a presidential declaration. Two days later, federal assistance was made available to both counties.

In the Oologah–Talala school district of Oklahoma, which was all but devastated during the tornado outbreak, the Oklahoma State Department of Education voted to forgive the remaining 23 days of classes, the largest number of instructional days forgiven in a single school year on record at the time. Individual student conferences were held at a local church. About 170 construction workers worked double shifts to repair the school grounds, which were tentatively set to reopen on August 12. Of the district's 24 buses, 15 were repaired in the weeks following the tornado outbreak, while nine were rendered inoperable. The school district reopened on August 15.

=== The Next-Generation Radar era ===
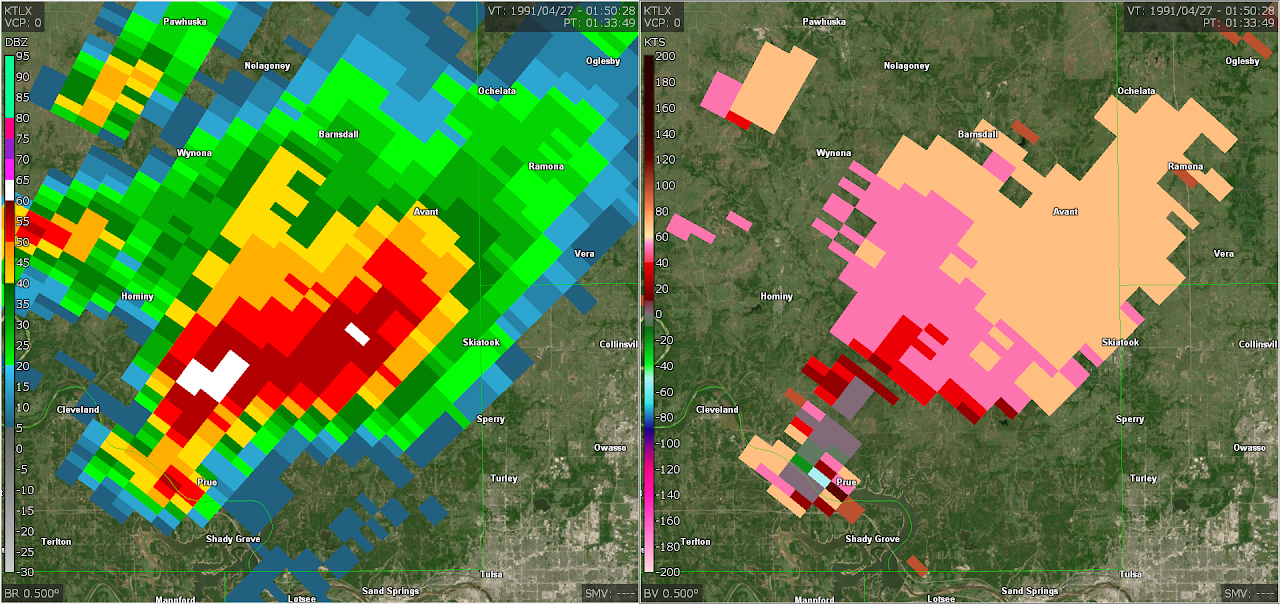
Weather Surveillance Radar-1988 Doppler/Next-Generation Radar scan of the Westport, Oklahoma F4 tornado.

The 1991 outbreak occurred during a period of modernization for the National Weather Service and helped highlight the value of weather radar imagery for detecting tornadoes. In April 1991, the WSR-88D NEXRAD radar in Norman, Oklahoma, was the only radar of its kind with Doppler capabilities, and even then it had not been cleared for use in day-to-day operations. In Oklahoma, the higher resolution radar displayed important storm-scale characteristics such as mesocyclones, some of which were seen over 125 miles (200 km) away in Kansas. For comparison, the outdated radars in that state, though closer, did not depict significant features indicative of an ongoing tornado. Instead, forecasters in Kansas were forced to rely on reports from the public and storm chasers. In an internal assessment of the event, the National Weather Service concluded that "The NWS should continue to implement the Next Generation Radar (NEXRAD) network across the Nation. This event illustrates the usefulness of the WSR-88D velocity fields and better azimuthal resolution reflectivity data." The implementation of these radars have improved tornado lead times in modern years.

=== In popular media ===
The outbreak was featured in two different documentaries: The Enemy Wind, a documentary produced by The Weather Channel, and Cyclone!, a documentary produced and distributed by National Geographic under its National Geographic Home Video series.

== See also ==
- Tornadoes of 1991
- March 1990 Central United States tornado outbreak
- List of North American tornadoes and tornado outbreaks
- List of Storm Prediction Center high risk days
- Mobile radar observation of tornadoes
  - List of notable observations
