= 1991 Andover tornado =

F5 tornado in 1991

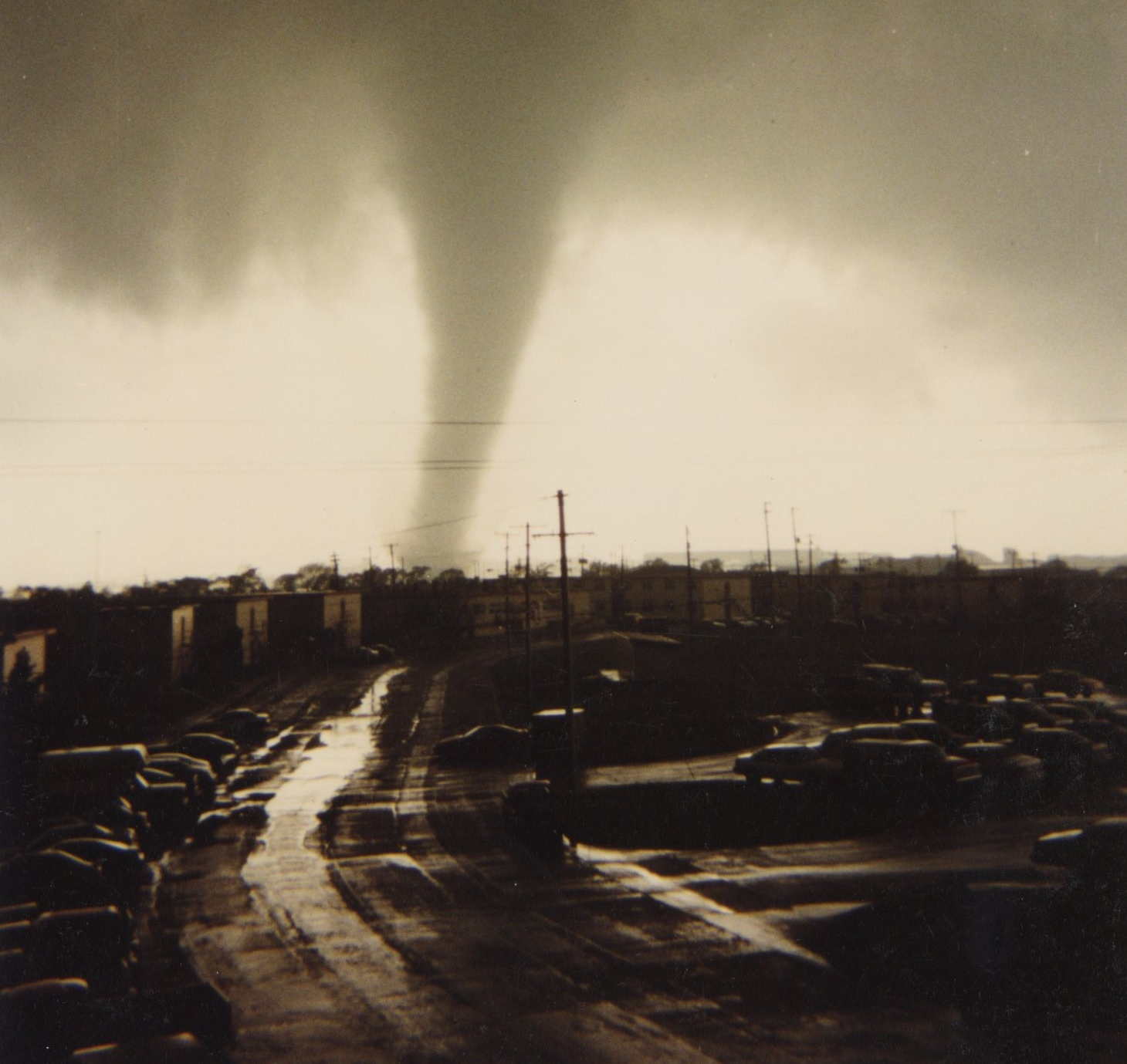
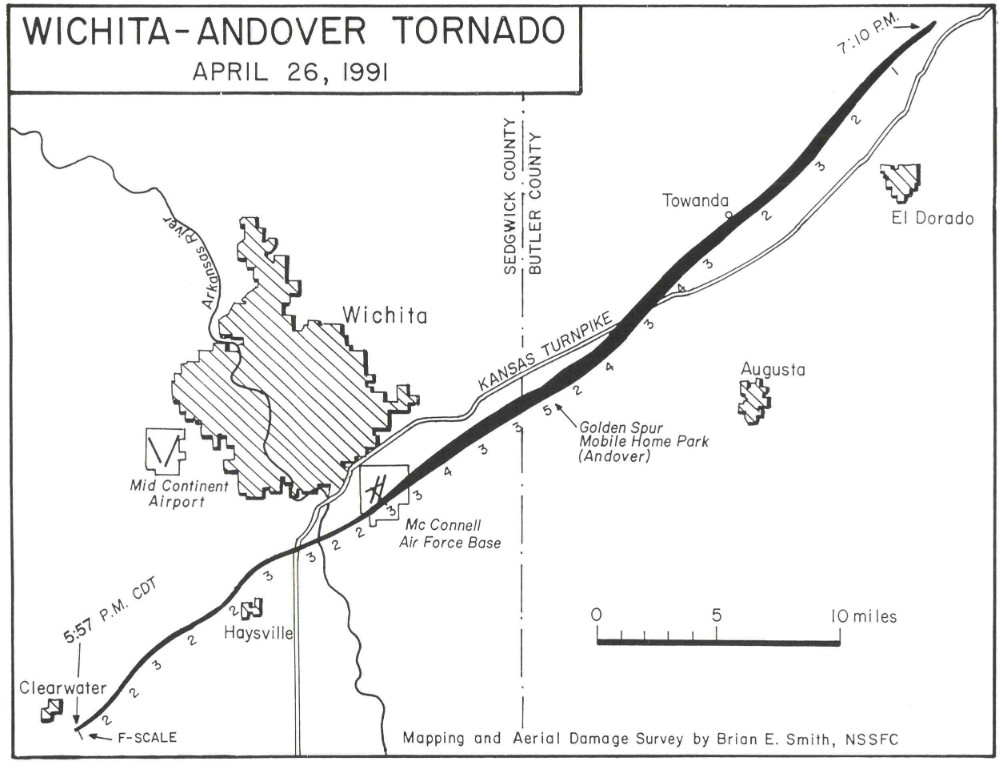
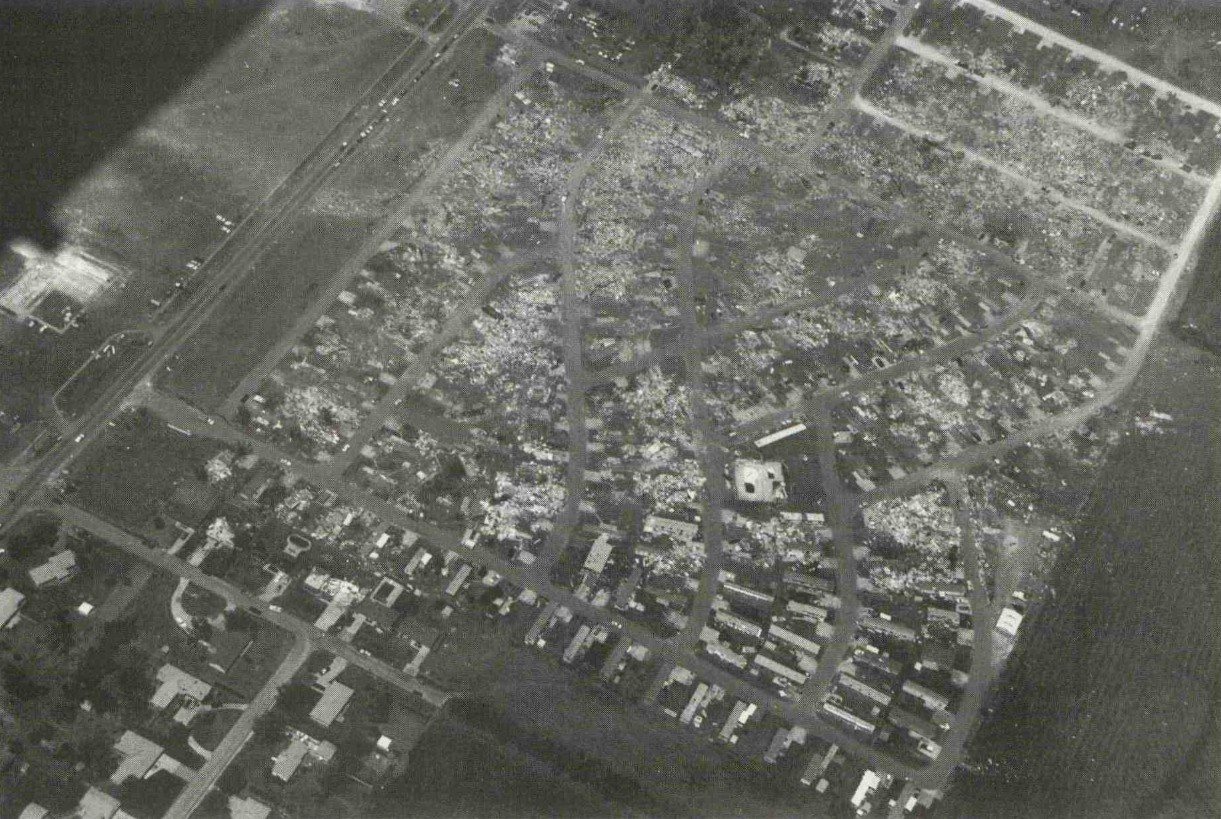
- Clockwise from top: The tornado approaching McConnell Air Force Base at F3 intensity; An aerial photo of the Golden Spurr mobile home park after the tornado; A map showing the track of the tornado and its intensity along it.

Meteorological history
- Formed: April 26, 1991, 5:49 p.m. CDT (UTC−05:00)
- Dissipated: April 26, 1991, 7:14 p.m. CDT (UTC−05:00)
- Duration: 1 hour and 25 minutes

F5 tornado
- on the Fujita scale
- Highest winds: 261 mph (420 km/h)

Overall effects
- Fatalities: 17 (deadliest in 1991)
- Injuries: 225
- Damage: ~$300 million (1991 USD) (second-costliest of the 1990s)
- Part of the 1991 Great Plains tornado outbreak and Tornadoes of 1991

In the afternoon of April 26, 1991, a large and destructive tornado moved through areas southeast of Wichita, located in the state of Kansas. The tornado killed seventeen, injured over two hundred others, and left an estimated $300 million worth of damages in its wake.

The tornado first touched down near Clearwater, moving northeast while retaining F0 and F1 intensity. The tornado rapidly intensified as it approached Haysville, reaching F3 intensity as it directly impacted the town. After leaving Haysville in ruins, the tornado struck several residential subdivisions in eastern Wichita, where four people were killed. The tornado then tracked across the McConnell Air Force Base, becoming violent shortly before hitting the tarmac. At this location, the tornado narrowly avoided striking ten Rockwell B-1 Lancers, two of which were equipped with nuclear warheads. The tornado then strengthened, reaching F5 intensity for the first time as it entered Andover. A mobile home park located in the town was obliterated, and thirteen people were killed; 165 more were injured as the park was torn apart in winds that were greater than 260 miles per hour (420 km/h). The tornado continued to heavily damage Andover before beginning to weaken after leaving the town. The tornado then struck an oil field, lofting a large oil tank over 0.8 miles (1.3 km) away. A short time later, the tornado dissipated, tracking a total of 46 miles (74 km) over a period spanning almost an hour and a half.

The tornado killed 17 people and produced damage that was rated as F5 by National Weather Service.

== Meteorological synopsis ==
Radar animation of supercell thunderstorms across Kansas and Oklahoma

On April 25, 1991, the National Weather Service issued a warning of an impending weather system, noting that computer models were "indicating this to be a very significant severe weather producer with tornadoes occurring across the Central/Southern Plains." On the morning of April 26, the organization delineated a High risk of severe weather across the Great Plains. A southeast-tilted trough existed across the Southwestern United States that morning, and a distinct jet streak, or a region of enhanced winds at the base of the trough, on the order of 75–85 kn (85–100 mph; 140–155 km/h) was progressing northeast toward the Plains. Through the morning, an 850 mb or approximately 5,000 ft (1,525 m) low-level jet of up to 60 kn (70 mph; 110 km/h) overspread regions from south-central Kansas northward into eastern Nebraska. A surface low-pressure area existed over southwestern Nebraska, supporting a dry line southward into Texas and a warm front southeastward across eastern sections of Kansas and Oklahoma.

In the unstable atmosphere between those two boundaries, surface dewpoints rose above 60 °F (15 °C). Abundant sunshine contributed to destabilization as lifted indices topped -12 from central Oklahoma into central Kansas and convective available potential energy reached in excess of 4,000 J/kg. A minimal capping inversion existed across Oklahoma even during the morning l, and tornado-producing storms first developed across western Oklahoma around sunrise. These storms weakened as they moved northeast into Kansas. Back to the west, the dryline progressed rapidly eastward but began to slow precipitously during the afternoon. Attempts at thunderstorm development along this feature initially failed. At 17:10 UTC (12:20 p.m. CDT), the National Weather Service issued a particularly dangerous situation tornado watch, warning of the potential for multiple strong to violent tornadoes.

Despite early failure at convective initiation, supercell thunderstorms rapidly erupted along the dryline during the afternoon as the jet streak propagated into the Great Plains, resulting in a regional outbreak of tornadoes stretching from Texas to Iowa. Violent tornadoes were concentrated in southern Kansas and Oklahoma, although tornadoes were also observed in Iowa, Texas, and Nebraska.

== Tornado summary ==
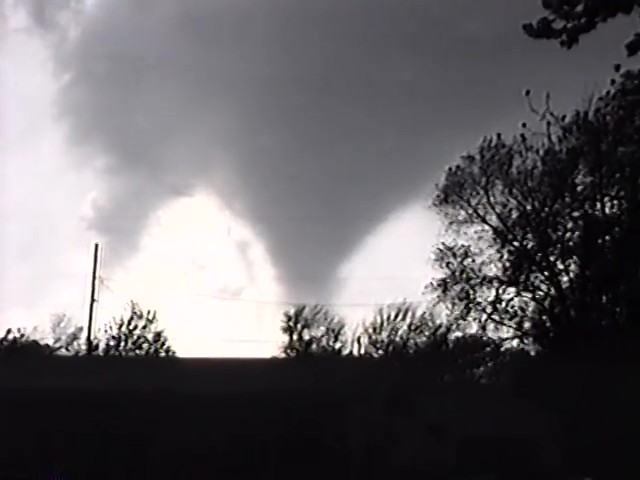
The tornado as it approached Haysville at F2-F3 intensity

=== Clearwater–Haysville–Southern Wichita ===
At 5:49 p.m. CDT, the tornado touched down south-southeast of Clearwater and quickly intensified to F2-F3 intensity as it moved northeast. The tornado maintained a path width of 200-300 ft as it remained over rural Sedgewick County. Around 1.5 miles from touchdown, the tornado was observed to be producing multiple vorticies. At 6:05 p.m., the National Weather Service issued a statement, urging residents of Haysville, Derby, and Mulvane to seek shelter from the approaching tornado.

At 6:18 p.m., the tornado struck Haysville at F2 intensity, causing 15 homes within a 4 block radius to sustain significant damage, with an additional 63 homes in Haysville suffering some form of damage from the tornado. Damage to homes included lost roof structures and collapsed walls. No one in Haysville was killed but a few people were injured.

The tornado further intensified as it left Haysville, where the tornado then flattened the Cox Produce Farm at F3 intensity. The tornado destroyed a further 28 homes in the area before striking a mobile home park at 57th and South Broadway streets. The tornado caused significant damage to 30 more homes before crossing the Kansas turnpike. The tornado then struck the River Oaks trailer court after crossing South Hydraulic Ave, where more than 100 mobile homes are damaged or destroyed. The tornado then struck the Oaklawn subdivision at F2 intensity as the Wichita Fire Department was actively trying to shut off to homes in the subdivision. At least two homes in Oaklawn were leveled by the tornado.

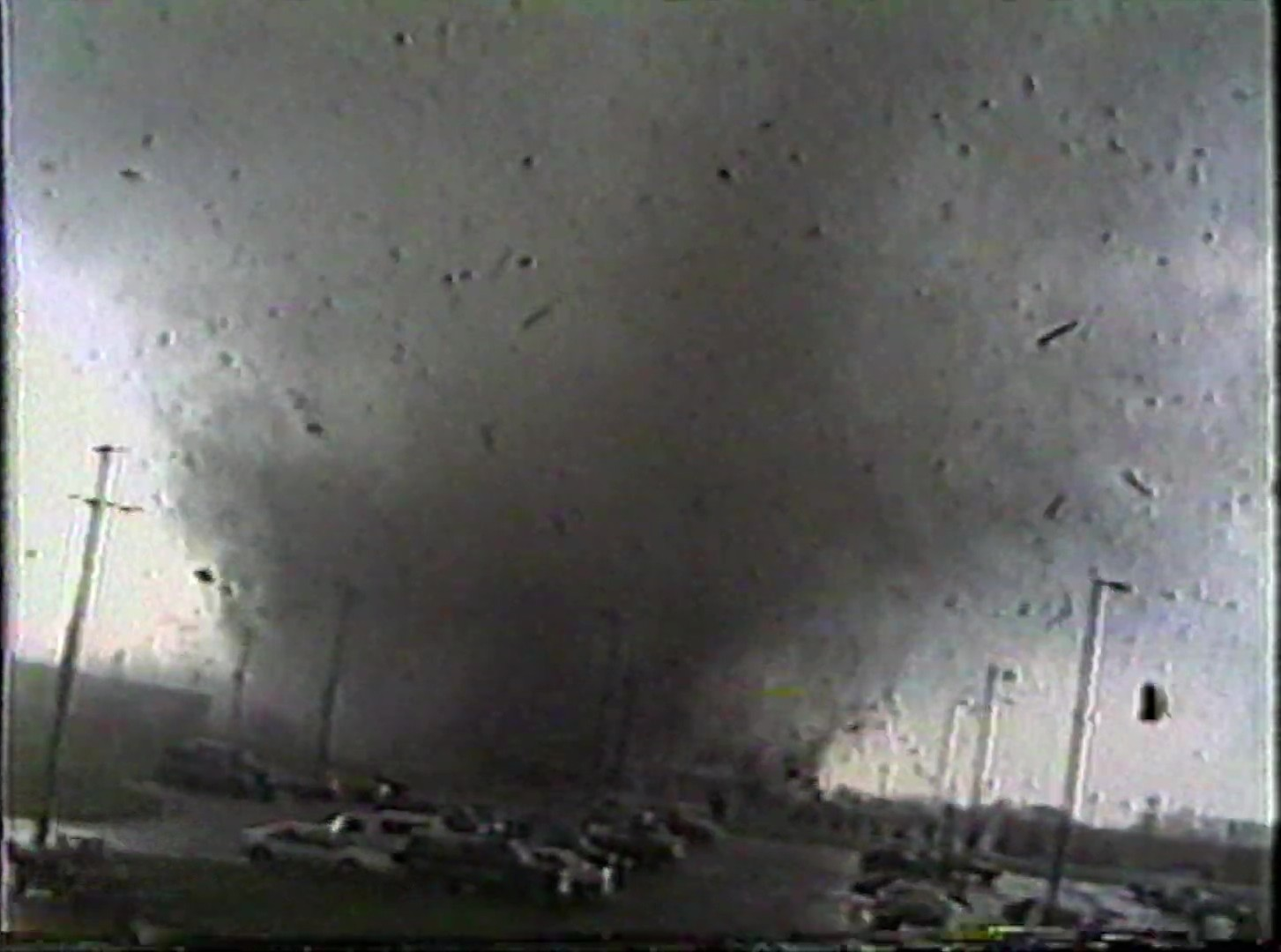
A frame of a famous video showing the tornado as it crossed over McConnell Air Force Base at F3 intensity.

=== McConnell Air Force Base ===
The tornado intensified to F3 strength as it began to cross over McConnell Air Force Base at 6:25 p.m.. The base was already on alert and had their civil defense siren blaring as the tornado struck. A building belonging to the Boeing Aircraft Company had its roof damaged just west of the main runways. The tornado narrowly missed a lineup of 10 B-1B bombers by around 1,000 ft to the south. Each of the B-1B bombers were worth around $280 million (1991 USD), and 2 were equipped with nuclear warheads, which would have caused toxic and radioactive materials to be released across the Air Force Base and the tornadoes path had they been struck.

Nine major facilities on the base were damaged or destroyed in the south portion of the base, including the base's hospital, officers club, and gymnasium. The tornado also struck several apartment-like housing facilities on the eastern portions of the base, with roof removal and second story wall collapses being prevalent. The Wineteer Elementary School right next to McConnell sustained significant F2 level damage to the building.

Due to the early warnings from forecasters as well as the preparedness of the base, no fatalities occurred, however at least 16 people were still injured on McConnell AFB. The total losses on the base reached $62 million (1991 USD).

A police dashboard camera video of the tornado at peak F5 intensity as it produced F5 level damage and approached the Golden Spur Mobile Home Park

=== Greenwich Heights–Springdale–Andover ===
After leaving McConnell Air Force Base, the tornado widened to 500-600 ft and intensified to F4 intensity as it struck the Greenwich Heights subdivision in eastern Wichita. At the same time, the National Weather Service issued a tornado warning for Andover and several surrounding communities. In Greenwich Heights, 4 fatalities occurred as several homes were leveled, with some being swept clean down to their foundations. The tornado then struck the Springdale subdivision, maintaining F4 intensity as well-built homes were leveled. Between McConnell AFB and Andover, more than 100 homes were damaged or destroyed.

Despite being warned of a damaging tornado approaching, the only tornado siren located in Andover failed to sound. As a result, multiple police officers drove through neighborhoods, including the Golden Spur Mobile Home Park, warning residents to seek shelter.

The tornado struck a subdivision just west of Golden Spur, where the tornado produced F5 level damage. Several homes along Lioba Dr, Chapel Dr, West 1st St, and Koob Ln were blown off of their foundations, and debris were scattered across the neighboring fields. Then at 6:40 p.m., the tornado struck the Golden Spur Mobile Home Park at peak F5 intensity, where at least 205 mobile homes were destroyed, with most being left only as their twisted frames. 333-336 residents were in the park during the tornado, 146 evacuated before the tornado struck, 149 sought refuge in the community storm shelter, and 39 people remained in their homes. No injuries or fatalities were reported with the residents who fled or sheltered in the storm shelter. Of the 39 people who remained, 9 sustained minor injuries, 17 were hospitalized, and 13 were killed by the tornado.

One vehicle from the mobile home park was thrown up to three quarters of a mile away to the northeast of the park.

=== Towanda–El Dorado ===
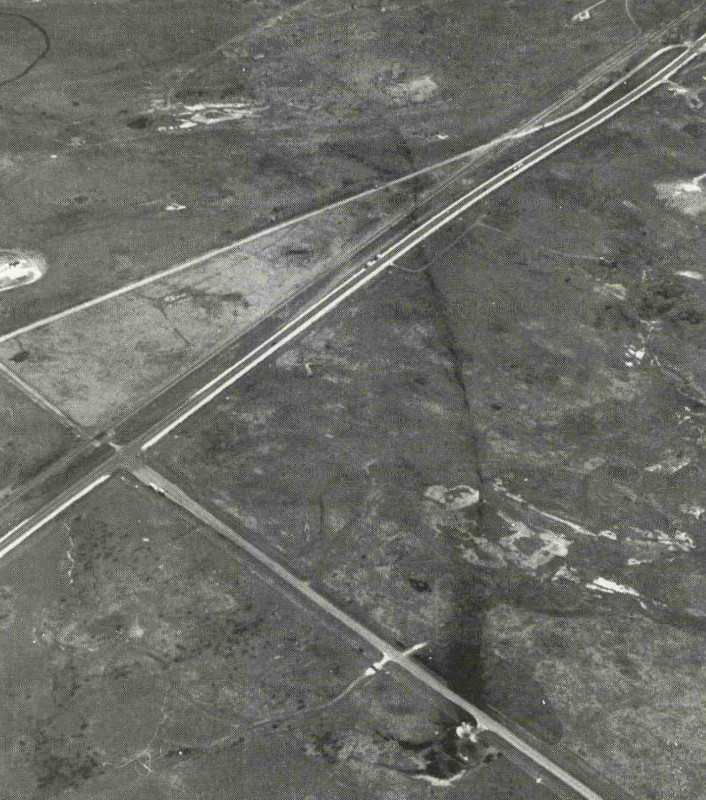
The oil trail left behind by a tank that was picked up and thrown 0.8 miles by the tornado as it tracked west of El Dorado

After leaving Andover, the tornado continued to the northeast into more rural areas, producing F3-F4 level damage. Three miles northeast of Andover, the tornado reached its peak width of 0.4 miles (2,000 ft) wide. The tornado re-intensified to F4 intensity as it crossed over the Kansas Turnpike south of Towanda, where in the fields 1 mile south of town, the tornado produced "spectacular suction vorticies". At 7:10 p.m., the tornado passed within 0.5 miles of Towanda as it passed to the southeast at F2-F3 intensity. Farms and homes in this area were heavily damaged or destroyed, with one being completely leveled and one of the horses had to be rescued from a swimming pool.

The tornado remained at F2-F3 intensity as it tracked over open fields west of El Dorado. In a field 4 miles west of the town, the tornado struck an oil tank that was full at the time. The tank was picked up and thrown at least 0.8 miles northeast before either being coming to a rest, or being destroyed. The tornado also destroyed 2 more oil tanks in the region as well.

The tornado weakened further to F1 intensity, and damage became spotty as the tornado passed north of El Dorado. The tornado soon dissipated 5 miles north of town.

The parent supercell then produced an F2 tornado on El Dorado Lake, which tracked northeastward, paralleling the Kansas Turnpike and impacting areas near Cassoday.

== Aftermath ==
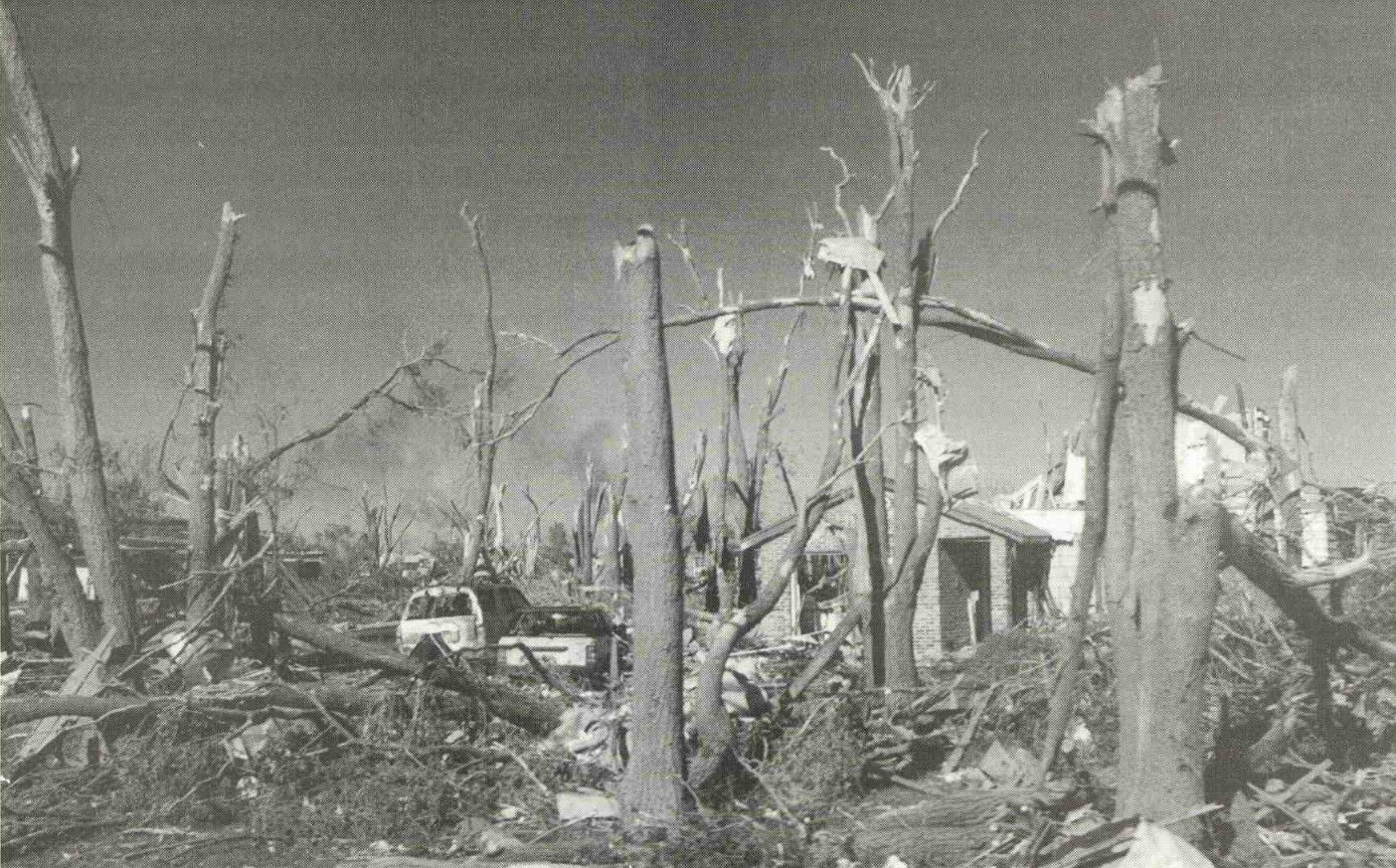
Snapped trees in Greenwich Heights, where the tornado produced F3-F4 damage.

Andover and surrounding areas were heavily damaged by the tornado, which carved a 46 miles (74 km) path through Sedgwick and Butler counties over a duration of one hour and twenty-five minutes. In Andover, the tornado directly impacted a mobile trailer park that had 244 homes in it; after the tornado only 39 of these homes could be recovered. Along the tornado's path through Andover, 102 housing units were destroyed. Hundreds of people were injured. Due to heavy damage, the Federal Emergency Management Agency (FEMA) designated much of the mobile home park and other areas as a federal disaster area.

=== Damage ===
F5 damage to a home in southern Andover.

The tornado produced heavy damage along its track, including significant damage to residential areas and a swath of F5 damage in a mobile trailer park located in Andover. In a National Weather Service post-event document released in December 1991, the curators noted that "the mobile home devastation was some of the worst that this surveyor has ever seen". Most of the mobile homes located in the park were destroyed, many of which were swept away or were obliterated with only their metal frames still intact.

Near El Dorado, the tornado lofted a full oil tank 0.8 miles (1.3 km); the oil tank was never recovered, and two more tanks were obliterated by the tornado as it moved through the area.

=== Nuclear warhead close-call ===
As the tornado moved past the McConnell Air Force Base, it narrowly avoided striking ten B-1B bombers, two of which were actively armed with nuclear warheads as the tornado passed by. Each of these bombers were worth an estimated $280 million (equivalent to $662 million in 2024).

=== Fatalities ===
Seventeen people were killed by the tornado, the majority of which were located in the Golden Spur Mobile Home Park. Four deaths occurred in Sedgwick County, and the thirteen others were all living or residing in the park at the time the tornado hit. 200 people who lived at the park took refuge in an underground tornado shelter prior to the tornado hitting the area, and it is likely that many more people would have died had that shelter not existed. 225 people were further injured by the tornado, many located in mobile homes or other structures that were completely destroyed by the tornado.

== See also ==
- 1992 Chandler–Lake Wilson tornado, another F5 tornado that would strike Minnesota a year later
- 1999 Bridge Creek–Moore tornado, the costliest tornado of the 1990s
- Nuclear close calls, incidents that nearly resulted in nuclear explosion, but did not.

== Notes and references ==
=== Sources ===
- Mosbacher, Robert A.; Knauss, John A.; Friday, Elbert W.; Damage Survey Team, NOAA (December 1991). "Wichita/Andover, Kansas, Tornado, April 26, 1991" (PDF). National Weather Service.
- Moore, Cody (2016). "Infamous Andover tornado outbreak - April 26, 1991". University of Louisville.
- Jen, Narramore (April 26, 2019). "The Wichita-Andover, KS F5 tornado - April 26, 1991". Tornado Talk.
- Fischer, Henry W.; Schaeffer, Susan; Trowbridge, Marna L. (January 1992). "The impact of media blame assignation on the EOC response to disaster: A case study of the response to the April 26, 1991, Andover (Kansas) Tornado". University of South Florida.
