= Terlton, Oklahoma =

- Town
- Location of Terlton, Oklahoma
- Coordinates: 36°11′15″N 96°29′31″W
- Country: United States
- State: Oklahoma
- County: Pawnee

Area
  - Total: 0.16 sq mi (0.41 km^{2})
  - Land: 0.16 sq mi (0.41 km^{2})
  - Water: 0 sq mi (0.00 km^{2})
- Elevation: 778 ft (237 m)

Population (2020)
  - Total: 77
  - Density: 486.5/sq mi (187.85/km^{2})
- Time zone: UTC-6 (Central (CST))
  - Summer (DST): UTC-5 (CDT)
- ZIP code: 74081
- Area codes: 539/918
- FIPS code: 40-72850
- GNIS feature ID: 2413375

Terlton is a town in Pawnee County, Oklahoma, United States. It is located one-half mile south of US 412/US 64 on Terlton Road and County Road E0570. The population was 77 at the time of the 2020 Census.

== History ==
The community started forming not long after the Cherokee Outlet opening on September 16, 1893. A post office was established November 30, 1894, and town was named Terlton for a member of the first territorial legislature, Ira N. Terrell. The Arkansas Valley and Western Railway (later the St. Louis and San Francisco Railway) built through town in the 1902-1903 timeframe, and Terlton developed into a trade center for the local agricultural industry. Oil was discovered in the vicinity about 1914, and oil-related industries like pipelines, tank farms and refining supported the town into the 1930s. In more recent years, Terlton has become a commuter town whose residents work in other locations and commute back to Terlton to live.

On Thursday April 26, 1984, a large nighttime F4 tornado struck the small town, killing three people and injuring over 30. This happened the same night as a tornado killed eight and injured nearly 100 in Morris, Oklahoma in Okmulgee County, 60 miles (97 km) to the southeast.

In 1985 an explosion at the Aerlex Corp. fireworks plant in town killed 21 people, about one-quarter of the community at that time. A short-film documentary, “Terlton,” debuted in 2019, documenting how the town has dealt with the tragedy.

Terlton was one of the filming sites for principal photography on Season One of the FX comedy series Reservation Dogs from filmmaker Sterlin Harjo, which concerns four Native American teens in rural Oklahoma.

== Geography ==
According to the United States Census Bureau, the town has a total area of 0.2 square miles (0.52 km^{2}), all land.

== Demographics ==
Historical population
Census	Pop.	Note	%±
1930	234		—
1940	245		4.7%
1950	122		−50.2%
1960	90		−26.2%
1970	111		23.3%
1980	155		39.6%
1990	121		−21.9%
2000	85		−29.8%
2010	106		24.7%
2020	77		−27.4%
U.S. Decennial Census

=== 2020 census ===
As of the 2020 census, Terlton had a population of 77. The median age was 44.7 years. 20.8% of residents were under the age of 18 and 22.1% of residents were 65 years of age or older. For every 100 females there were 92.5 males, and for every 100 females age 18 and over there were 103.3 males age 18 and over.

0.0% of residents lived in urban areas, while 100.0% lived in rural areas.

There were 30 households in Terlton, of which 56.7% had children under the age of 18 living in them. Of all households, 43.3% were married-couple households, 26.7% were households with a male householder and no spouse or partner present, and 20.0% were households with a female householder and no spouse or partner present. About 26.7% of all households were made up of individuals and 10.0% had someone living alone who was 65 years of age or older.

There were 39 housing units, of which 23.1% were vacant. The homeowner vacancy rate was 0.0% and the rental vacancy rate was 28.6%.

Racial composition as of the 2020 census
Race	Number	Percent
White	62	80.5%
Black or African American	0	0.0%
American Indian and Alaska Native	3	3.9%
Asian	0	0.0%
Native Hawaiian and Other Pacific Islander	0	0.0%
Some other race	2	2.6%
Two or more races	10	13.0%
Hispanic or Latino (of any race)	3	3.9%

=== 2000 census ===
As of the census of 2000, there were 85 people, 30 households, and 21 families residing in the town. The population density was 344.3 inhabitants per square mile (132.9/km^{2}). There were 37 housing units at an average density of 149.9 per square mile (57.9/km^{2}). The racial makeup of the town was 97.65% White, 1.18% Native American, and 1.18% from two or more races. Hispanic or Latino of any race were 2.35% of the population.

There were 30 households, out of which 53.3% had children under the age of 18 living with them, 60.0% were married couples living together, 13.3% had a female householder with no husband present, and 26.7% were non-families. 26.7% of all households were made up of individuals, and 10.0% had someone living alone who was 65 years of age or older. The average household size was 2.83 and the average family size was 3.50.

In the town, the population was spread out, with 41.2% under the age of 18, 8.2% from 18 to 24, 28.2% from 25 to 44, 17.6% from 45 to 64, and 4.7% who were 65 years of age or older. The median age was 26 years. For every 100 females, there were 97.7 males. For every 100 females age 18 and over, there were 92.3 males.

The median income for a household in the town was $22,917, and the median income for a family was $30,536. Males had a median income of $31,458 versus $20,000 for females. The per capita income for the town was $7,862. There were 17.4% of families and 15.1% of the population living below the poverty line, including no under eighteens and 25.0% of those over 64.

== Education ==
It is in the Cleveland Public Schools school district.
