= Westport, Oklahoma =

- Town
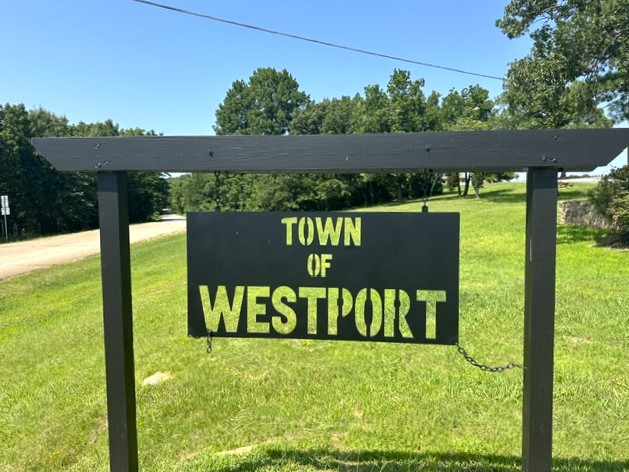
- Town of Westport sign in July of 2026

- Location of Westport, Oklahoma
- Coordinates: 36°11′39″N 96°20′11″W
- Country: United States
- State: Oklahoma
- County: Pawnee

Area
  - Total: 8.66 sq mi (22.44 km^{2})
  - Land: 4.36 sq mi (11.29 km^{2})
  - Water: 4.31 sq mi (11.15 km^{2})
- Elevation: 764 ft (233 m)

Population (2020)
  - Total: 448
  - Density: 103/sq mi (39.7/km^{2})
- Time zone: UTC-6 (Central (CST))
  - Summer (DST): UTC-5 (CDT)
- ZIP code: 74020
- Area codes: 539/918
- FIPS code: 40-80250
- GNIS feature ID: 2413474

Westport is a town in Pawnee County, Oklahoma, United States. The population was 448 as of the 2020 Census, a 50.3% increase over the figure of 298 at the 2010 census, which was itself a gain of 12.9% over the figure of 264 reported in 2000.

== History ==
The city is much newer than most towns in northeast Oklahoma. It was incorporated in the mid 1960s, after completion of Lake Keystone. Most of the residences were built between 1960 and 1979. Its first Federal census reported 146 residents in 1970. The census population previously peaked at 325 in 1990, then dropped to 264 in 2000, perhaps because of major damage inflicted by an F4 tornado that occurred as part of a major tornado outbreak. Both subsequent censuses have reported gains. Over 96 percent of the employed residents commuted to work in Stillwater or Tulsa.

== Geography ==
According to the United States Census Bureau, the town has a total area of 8.4 square miles (22 km^{2}), of which 4.0 square miles (10 km^{2}) is land and 4.5 square miles (12 km^{2}) (52.78%) is water.

== Demographics ==
Historical population
Census	Pop.	Note	%±
1970	146		—
1980	265		81.5%
1990	326		23.0%
2000	264		−19.0%
2010	298		12.9%
2020	448		50.3%
U.S. Decennial Census

=== 2020 census ===
As of the 2020 census, Westport had a population of 448. The median age was 47.7 years. 18.5% of residents were under the age of 18 and 25.0% of residents were 65 years of age or older. For every 100 females there were 98.2 males, and for every 100 females age 18 and over there were 97.3 males age 18 and over.

0.0% of residents lived in urban areas, while 100.0% lived in rural areas.

There were 186 households in Westport, of which 31.7% had children under the age of 18 living in them. Of all households, 58.1% were married-couple households, 14.5% were households with a male householder and no spouse or partner present, and 23.1% were households with a female householder and no spouse or partner present. About 23.6% of all households were made up of individuals and 9.7% had someone living alone who was 65 years of age or older.

There were 218 housing units, of which 14.7% were vacant. The homeowner vacancy rate was 1.8% and the rental vacancy rate was 0.0%.

Racial composition as of the 2020 census
Race	Number	Percent
White	380	84.8%
Black or African American	1	0.2%
American Indian and Alaska Native	23	5.1%
Asian	1	0.2%
Native Hawaiian and Other Pacific Islander	0	0.0%
Some other race	1	0.2%
Two or more races	42	9.4%
Hispanic or Latino (of any race)	6	1.3%

=== 2000 census ===
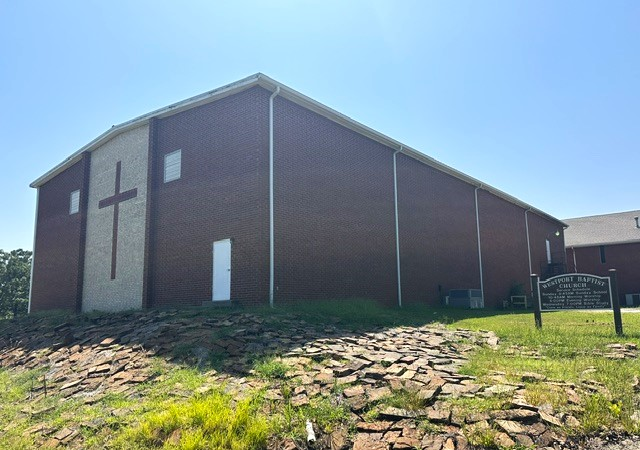
Westport Baptist Church, 7-2026

As of the census of 2000, there were 264 people, 99 households, and 82 families residing in the town. The population density was 66.1 inhabitants per square mile (25.5/km^{2}). There were 109 housing units at an average density of 27.3 per square mile (10.5/km^{2}). The racial makeup of the town was 87.88% White, 0.76% African American, 3.03% Native American, 0.76% Asian, and 7.58% from two or more races. Hispanic or Latino of any race were 1.89% of the population.

There were 99 households, out of which 29.3% had children under the age of 18 living with them, 80.8% were married couples living together, 2.0% had a female householder with no husband present, and 16.2% were non-families. 12.1% of all households were made up of individuals, and 6.1% had someone living alone who was 65 years of age or older. The average household size was 2.67 and the average family size was 2.86.

In the town, the population was spread out, with 22.0% under the age of 18, 8.7% from 18 to 24, 20.8% from 25 to 44, 36.4% from 45 to 64, and 12.1% who were 65 years of age or older. The median age was 44 years. For every 100 females, there were 91.3 males. For every 100 females age 18 and over, there were 92.5 males.

The median income for a household in the town was $54,250, and the median income for a family was $64,375. Males had a median income of $36,667 versus $32,083 for females. The per capita income for the town was $23,345. About 4.3% of families and 6.8% of the population were below the poverty line, including none of those under the age of eighteen and 15.6% of those 65 or over.

== Education ==
Most of the municipality is in the Cleveland Public Schools school district. Pieces are in the Mannford Public Schools school district and the Keystone Public School school district.
