= National Register of Historic Places listings in Garfield County, Oklahoma =

Location of Garfield County in Oklahoma

This is a list of the National Register of Historic Places listings in Garfield County, Oklahoma.

This is intended to be a complete list of the properties and districts on the National Register of Historic Places in Garfield County, Oklahoma, United States. The locations of National Register properties and districts for which the latitude and longitude coordinates are included below, may be seen in a map.

There are 36 properties and districts listed on the National Register in the county.

This National Park Service list is complete through NPS recent listings posted August 28, 2026.

== Current listings ==
	Name on the Register	Image	Date listed	Location	City or town	Description
1	Babe's Package Store	Babe's Package Store	September 8, 2017 (#100001589)	220 S. 3rd. 36°23′47″N 97°52′29″W	Enid	
2	Bank of Drummond		October 5, 2023 (#100009399)	402 Main St. 36°18′00″N 98°02′12″W	Drummond	
3	Bank of Hunter		June 22, 1984 (#84003014)	Cherokee and Main Sts. 36°33′50″N 97°39′40″W	Hunter	Demolished in 2009 following a roof collapse; last used as a bank in 1991
4	Eugene S. Briggs Auditorium	Eugene S. Briggs Auditorium	September 8, 2017 (#100001590)	2450 E. Maine; 36°23′44″N 97°50′35″W	Enid	
5	Broadway Tower	Broadway Tower	November 14, 1985 (#85002789)	114 E. Broadway St. 36°23′48″N 97°52′38″W	Enid	Enid's tallest building, a 1931 Art Deco structure
6	Carrier Congregational Church	Carrier Congregational Church	June 14, 2016 (#16000370)	204 N. 5th St. 36°28′38″N 98°01′22″W	Carrier	
7	H. H. Champlin House	H. H. Champlin House	January 21, 1993 (#92001833)	612 S. Tyler; 36°23′25″N 97°53′36″W	Enid	1939 Tudor Revival house in the Kisner Heights addition
8	Cherokee Terrace Apartments	Cherokee Terrace Apartments	December 18, 2013 (#13000939)	619 E. Maine St. 36°23′42″N 97°52′10″W	Enid	
9	Clay Hall	Clay Hall	June 20, 2012 (#12000346)	311-325 Lakeview Dr. 36°23′36″N 97°50′50″W	Enid	
10	Covington Jail		October 30, 2024 (#100010778)	514 W. Main St. 36°18′21″N 97°35′32″W	Covington	
11	T.T. Eason Mansion	T.T. Eason Mansion	March 24, 1987 (#87000417)	1305 W. Broadway; 36°23′47″N 97°53′38″W	Enid	Home to oilman T.T. Eason and located in the Waverley Historic District
12	Enid Armory	Enid Armory	September 8, 1988 (#88001370)	600 E. Elm; 36°24′N 97°52′W	Enid	
13	Enid Cemetery and Calvary Catholic Cemetery	Enid Cemetery and Calvary Catholic Cemetery	March 21, 1996 (#96000305)	200 block of W. Willow Ave. 36°25′18″N 97°52′47″W	Enid	Burials include H.H. Champlin, the Frantz brothers, James Yancy Callahan, and Houstin James, father of Marquis James
14	Enid Downtown Historic District	Enid Downtown Historic District	December 12, 2007 (#07001265)	Roughly bounded by Maple Ave., 2nd St., Cherokee Ave., and Adams St. 36°23′48″N 97°52′48″W	Enid	Encompasses the original 1893 town plat and portions of the Jonesville and Weatherly additions; includes the county courthouse, First National Bank, Broadway Tower, and Enid Masonic Temple. A boundary increase was approved on July 15, 2019.
15	Enid High School Observatory	Enid High School Observatory	March 15, 2018 (#100002216)	611 W. Wabash Ave. 36°23′20″N 97°53′09″W	Enid	
16	Enid Terminal Grain Elevators Historic District	Enid Terminal Grain Elevators Historic District	April 20, 2009 (#09000239)	Near E. Willow Rd., N. 16th St., N. 10th St., and N. Van Buren St. 36°25′12″N 97°51′17″W	Enid	Consists of eight terminal grain elevators constructed between 1925 and 1954
17	Fuksa Portion of the Chisholm Trail Roadbed		September 8, 2015 (#15000578)	Address Restricted	Bison vicinity	
18	John and Mary Fuksa Farm		December 8, 2015 (#15000867)	1228 E0580 Rd. 36°10′27″N 97°53′37″W	Bison	
19	Garfield County Courthouse	Garfield County Courthouse	August 23, 1984 (#84003018)	W. Broadway; 36°23′49″N 97°52′44″W	Enid	Art Deco courthouse completed in 1936 to replace a building destroyed by fire
20	Harrison School	Harrison School	June 12, 2017 (#100001073)	212 W. Birch Ave. 36°24′34″N 97°52′51″W	Enid	
21	R. E. Hoy No. 1 Oil Well		September 26, 1986 (#86002357)	Off U.S. Route 64; 36°21′24″N 97°34′22″W	Covington	First oil well drilled in Oklahoma under a geologist's instruction and the beginning of the Covington-Garber field
22	Jackson School	Jackson School	July 19, 1989 (#89000848)	415 E. Illinois; 36°23′07″N 97°49′42″W	Enid	One of three Mission/Spanish Colonial Revival structures in Enid; operated as an elementary school from 1936 to 1969.
23	H.L. Kaufman House		December 12, 1985 (#85003339)	1708 W. Maine; 36°23′44″N 97°53′56″W	Enid	Built for Herbert Lyons Kaufman, a Jewish Enid merchant who owned the downtown Kaufman Style Shop; demolished in 2005
24	Kenwood Historic District	Kenwood Historic District	December 6, 2004 (#04001328)	Bounded by Oak St., Maple, Washington, and Madison; 36°24′03″N 97°53′00″W	Enid	Encompasses 160 acres (0.65 km^{2}) of housing created between 1895 and 1915; majority of houses are American Foursquares
25	Kimmell Barn	Kimmell Barn	January 30, 1984 (#84003021)	Northeast of Covington; 36°21′43″N 97°32′21″W	Covington	Sandstone bank barn constructed in 1906 in a German style
26	Robert R. and Minnie L. Kisner House	Robert R. and Minnie L. Kisner House	December 8, 2015 (#15000870)	1111 Wynona Ave. 36°23′19″N 97°53′33″W	Enid	
27	Lamerton House	Lamerton House	June 20, 1997 (#97000613)	1420 W. Indian Dr. 36°23′12″N 97°53′41″W	Enid	Tudor Revival house designed in 1928 by John Duncan Forsyth of Tulsa
28	Liberty Federal Savings and Loan Association Building		December 7, 2021 (#100007233)	401 West Broadway Ave. 36°23′48″N 97°52′59″W	Enid	
29	Marshall Hall	Marshall Hall	December 8, 2015 (#15000868)	100 S. University Ave. 36°23′51″N 97°50′41″W	Enid	On the campus of Northern Oklahoma College
30	McCristy-Knox Mansion	McCristy-Knox Mansion	March 24, 1987 (#87000418)	1323 W. Broadway; 36°23′47″N 97°53′40″W	Enid	Built in 1909 and home to mill owner Joseph McChristy, oilman Charles Knox, and Michael Hedges; located within the Waverley Historic District
31	Public Library of Enid and Garfield County	Public Library of Enid and Garfield County	December 8, 2015 (#15000869)	120 W. Maine St. 36°23′45″N 97°52′45″W	Enid	
32	Rock Island Depot	Rock Island Depot	July 18, 1979 (#79003639)	200 Owen K. Garriott Boulevard; 36°23′25″N 97°52′37″W	Enid	Built in 1928, 3 miles (4.8 km) south of the original location; dispute over depot location prompted the Enid-Pond Creek Railroad War
33	Santa Fe Freight Depot	Santa Fe Freight Depot	December 8, 2015 (#15000871)	702 N. Washington Ave. 36°24′14″N 97°52′55″W	Enid	Houses the Railroad Museum of Oklahoma.
34	Security National Bank	Security National Bank	September 8, 2017 (#100001591)	201 W. Broadway; 36°23′48″N 97°52′49″W	Enid	
35	Waverley Historic District	Waverley Historic District	December 6, 2006 (#06001110)	Roughly bounded by W. Broadway Ave., N. and S. Tyler Sts., S. Harrison St., W. Oklahoma St., and N. and S. Buchanan Sts. 36°23′48″N 97°53′44″W	Enid	Platted between 1902 and 1907; consists of 275 buildings, primarily residential, including the T.T. Eason Mansion and the McChristy-Knox Mansion
36	Booker T. Washington School		August 23, 2024 (#100010777)	801 Pastor Alfred Baldwin Jr. Way; 36°23′20″N 97°52′13″W	Enid	

== See also ==
- List of National Historic Landmarks in Oklahoma
- National Register of Historic Places listings in Oklahoma
