= Champlin Refining Company =

Defunct oil company founded in Oklahoma, United States

- Type: public
- Industry: Petroleum
- Founded: 1916; 110 years ago
- Defunct: 1986; 40 years ago
- Fate: Merged into Union Pacific Resources Company
- Headquarters: Enid, Oklahoma,
- Key people: H.H. Champlin (founder)
- Products: Fuels, lubricants

The Champlin Refining Company, originally the Champlin Oil Company, was an oil company based in Enid, Oklahoma.

== History ==
In 1916, oil was discovered at Garber Field. Enid banker H.H. Champlin bought the mineral rights from George Beggs, a farmer who resided in the area. Champlin's wife Ary had encouraged him to do so. He purchased a small refinery from Victor Bolene, and built a pipeline between it and Garber Field. In 1920, he purchased the Goodwell Oil Company which consisted of several bulk plants and service stations. During his lifetime, the Champlin Oil Company expanded to operate service stations and wholesale outlets in twenty midwestern states and drilling and production operations in Oklahoma, Texas, Colorado, and New Mexico. By Mr. Champlin's death in 1944, the company employed over 800 people in Enid.

Following nine years of continued family ownership, the company went public in 1953.

It had several owners:

- 1954: Purchased by the Chicago Corporation for $55,000,000. This parent company changed its name to Champlin Refining Company in 1956.
- 1964: The Celanese Company purchased the company.
- 1970: The company was sold to Union Pacific Corporation and was kept as a wholly owned subsidiary.
- 1984: The Retail business of Champlin was purchased by American Petrofina, after Champlin closed the refinery.
- around 1986, Union Pacific Corporation and Champlin Petroleum Company sold the Corpus Christi Refinery. The Champlin trade name was part of the deal. Champlin's name was changed to Union Pacific Resources Company (UPRC).
- During late 1990s, Union Pacific Corporation spun off the Union Pacific Resources Company.
- 2000: Anadarko Petroleum acquired Union Pacific Resources.
