= Enid Cemetery =

United States historic place in Oklahoma

- Enid Cemetery and Calvary Catholic Cemetery
- U.S. National Register of Historic Places
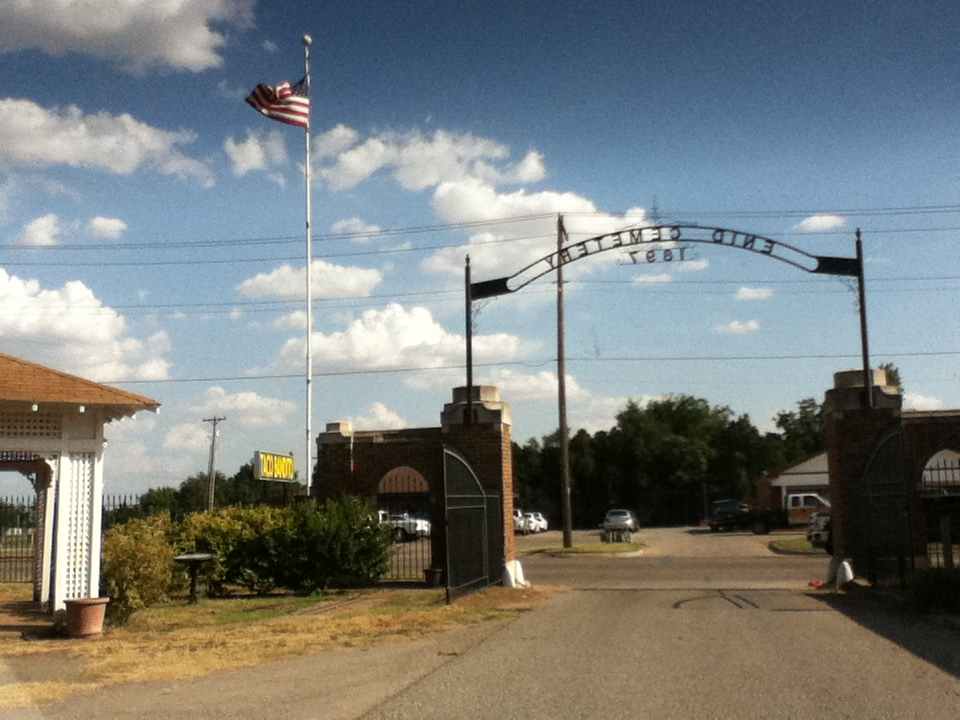
- A view exiting the Enid Cemetery.

- Location within Oklahoma Location within the United States
- Location: 200 block of W. Willow Ave; Enid, Oklahoma
- Coordinates: 36°25′18″N 97°52′47″W
- Built: 1898
- Architectural style: Mission Revival, Neo-Classical
- NRHP reference No.: 96000305
- Added to NRHP: 1996

The Enid Cemetery is a cemetery in Enid, Oklahoma. Together with the Calvary Catholic Cemetery, it has been listed on the National Register of Historic Places since 1996. Opened in the 1890s, the two cemeteries were designed in the rural cemetery style. Only a portion of the Enid Cemetery contributes to the historical significance: the Original (1898), First (1918), Second (1920), and Evergreen (1923) additions. Together these encompass a 967 by 1,318-foot (402 m) area historical section.

== History ==
Enid's earliest graves were located on the Hymen and Cora Anderson farm land, following the death of their one-year-old son Lee Stuart in 1897. Lee Stuart's grave was joined by those of an elderly man, Peter J. Bradley, and a young black child named Johnson a few weeks later. Anderson deeded 15 acres (61,000 m^{2}) of his land to the city in 1898 for use as a cemetery. In April 1898, a 10.5-acre (42,000 m^{2}) section of the Anderson land was deeded to Enid's St. Francis Xavier congregation led by Bishop Theophile Meerschaert. In 1913, the Enid Cemetery Association bought 10 more acres from Zachary Taylor which would become the First and Second Additions. In 1929, the Enid Cemetery Association expanded the Calvary land by 2 additional acres. The Calvary Catholic Cemetery contains a mausoleum built in 1904 for Ruth Sara Kennedy from white marble in the Neo-Classical Revival style.

The Enid Cemetery contains a white Georgia marble Art Deco, Neo-Classical Revival styled mausoleum built in 1921 by the Economy Mausoleum Company, a red brick Mission Revival style tool shed from 1927, and an Art Deco gate, reading Enid Cemetery 1897.

At least 430 original homesteaders from the Land Run of 1893 are buried here, including:

- Mary Giles, a clerk at the Enid land office.
- James T. Douthitt, an original homesteader, who was shot by his wife, Dollie in 1904. Later, Dollie Douthitt also wounded several people during a courthouse shooting spree.
- Fredrick and Susan Dresser, original homesteaders who lived inside a dug-out creek bank, unable to afford construction of a house.

== Sections ==
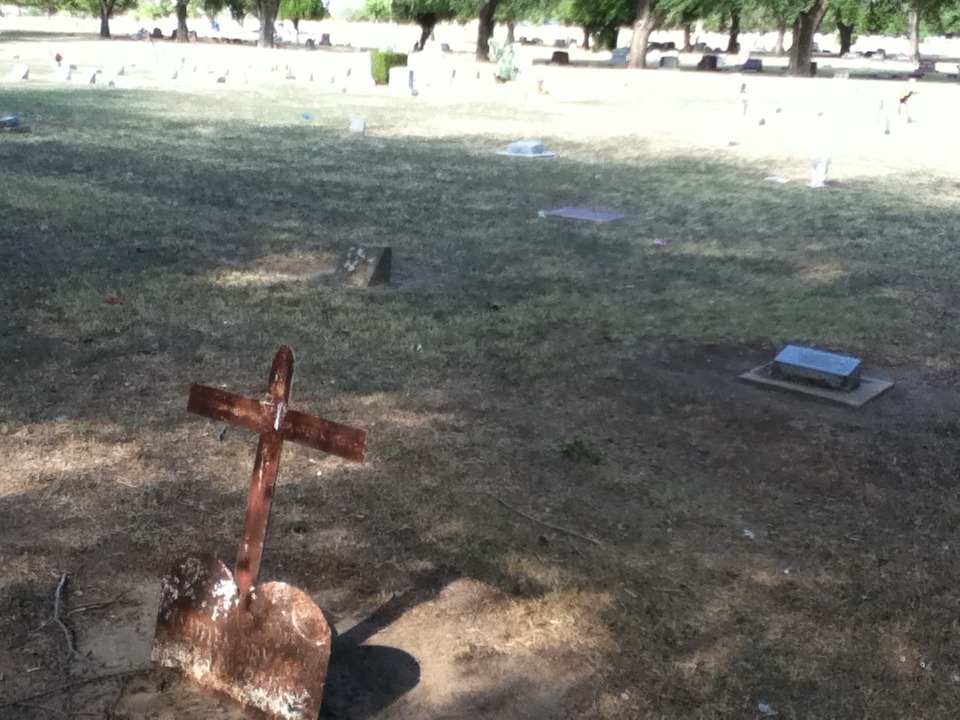
Graves in Potter's Field, where black people were buried during segregation, and the poorer citizens were buried, often in unmarked graves.

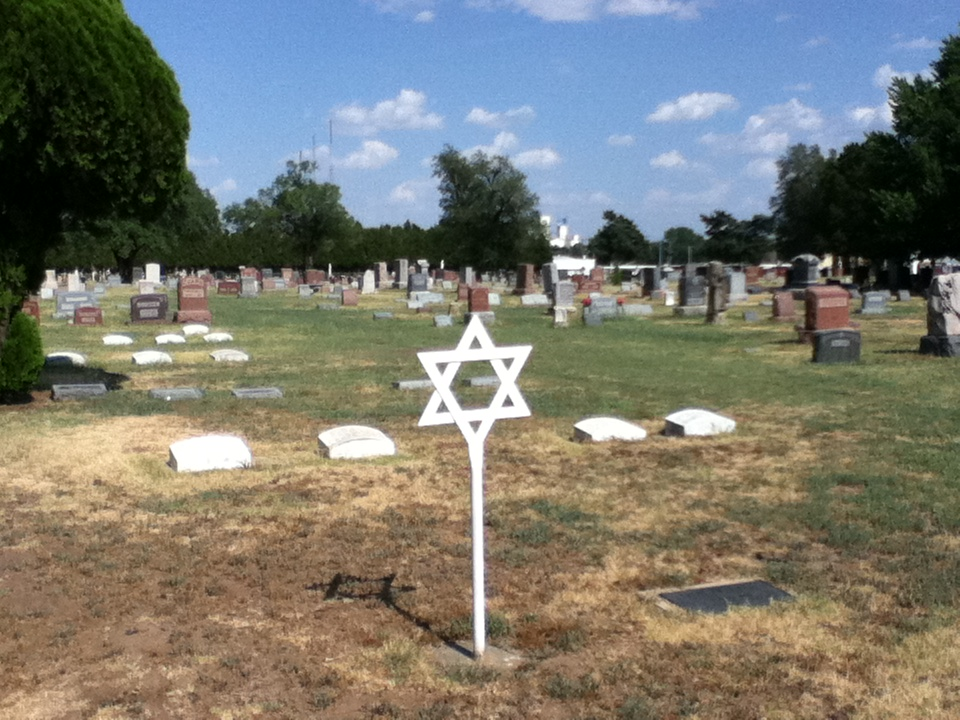
A magen david is mounted on a metal pole near the graves of Enid's Jewish citizens who chose to be buried close to one another, forming a Jewish section in the Enid Cemetery.

Black people were interred in Potter's Field during segregation, and had a separate entrance to the cemetery. The plots in this section were the least expensive, and many of the graves are unmarked. Local legend holds that Boston Corbett, who shot the assassin John Wilkes Booth is buried in one of these unmarked graves. Corbett was known to have peddled medicine in Enid for W.W. Garrit and Company of Topeka. More famous to the Enid area, is a corpse that never received a burial—that of David E. George, a drifter, who claimed to be Booth himself, and committed suicide in Enid's Grand Hotel in 1903. His body, ultimately claimed by his lawyer, Finis L. Bates, went on a nationwide tour for over 50 years before ultimately disappearing.

The Jewish section of the Enid Cemetery contains the graves of many early Enid merchants, including Herbert L. Kaufman, Milton Newman, Marinus Marcus Godschalk, and Abraham Herzberg, all of whom owned businesses in Enid's downtown. Herbert Kaufman's house was listed on the National Register of Historic Places, and he operated Kaufman's Style Shop. Marinus Godschalk founded Enid's first clothing store with Joseph Meiberg called Meiberg and Godschalk. Milton Newman ran Enid's branch of Newman Mercantile. Abraham Herzberg founded Herzberg's Department Store and his house is a contributing property to the Waverley Historic District.

In the American Legion section, veterans from the Spanish–American War, the American Civil War, World War I, and World War II are laid to rest, often with bronze insignias representing the battles in which they fought. The Irvin McDowell Circle of the Grand Army of the Republic built a Civil War Memorial in 1917 and the United Commercial Travelers built a World War I Memorial in 1920. Grave markers also include insignias representing membership in the Masons, International Order of the Odd Fellows, the Woodmen of America, and the Grand Army of the Republic.

== Contributing historical objects ==
Potter's Field, the Jewish section, and the Champlin family plot are all contributing sections of the cemetery. The 1921 Neo-Classical Revival and Art Deco style white marble Mausoleum, the 1927 red-brown brick Mission Revival style tool shed, 1917 Red brick office building, 1914 Gazebo, 1929 Art Deco gate, and the Elm and cedar trees planted in 1923 are contributing objects. Several contributing objects are memorials to military service such as the American Legion plot with forty-eight graves of veterans, Union Veterans section of fourteen graves, World War I memorial to Garfield County veterans who died in service, and 1917 Ladies of the Grand Army of the Republic Civil War monument to the unknown soldier. The Kennedy Mausoleum and open-air altar in the Calvary Catholic Cemetery.

Several grave markers also contribute to the historic significance of the cemetery: William F. Svarik (1909) in the Catholic cemetery, W.C. Conley (1889–1921) in Potter's Field, William Mason (1909–1936) and M.J. Adler (1867–1919) in the Jewish section, Lt. Commander Robert L. Strickler, Martha J Camden (1852–1926), Aviation Cadet John Willard Nivison (1922–1943), Allen B. Crandall, Opal Young (1899–1903), Lee Stuart Anderson (1896–1897), Frank James T. Douthitt (1904–1923), and the Mill family in the Enid Cemetery.

== Notable graves ==
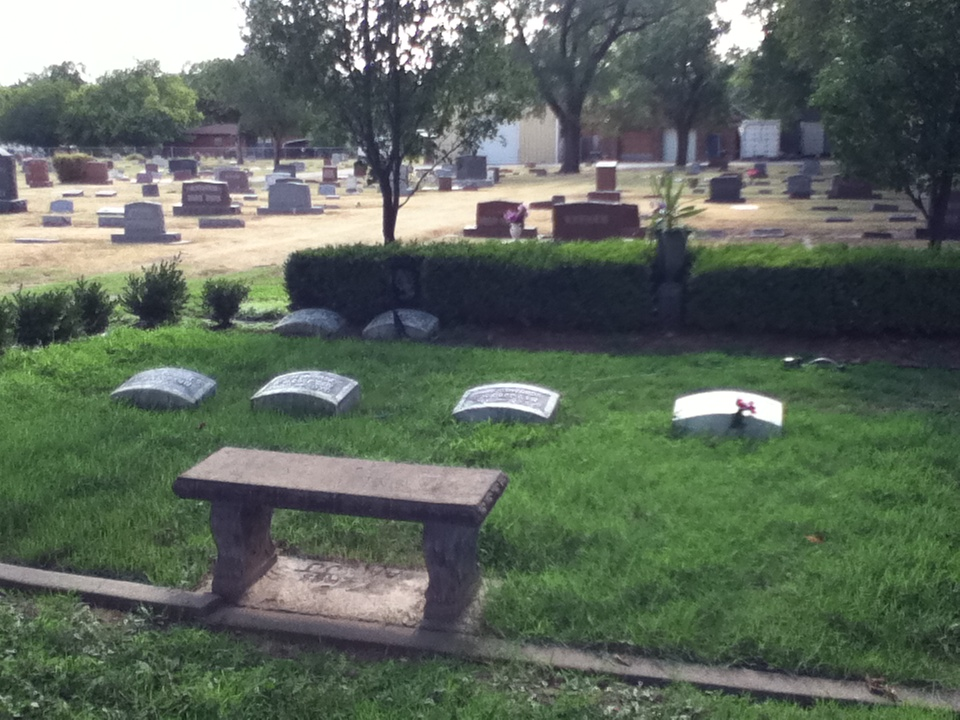
The Champlin family plot.

Notable among those interred are:

- H.H. Champlin, founder of Champlin Refinery and the First National Bank of Enid.
- W.O. Cromwell, Attorney General of Oklahoma Territory and advisor to Governor William H. Murray
- The Frantz Brothers, local businessmen who helped establish the Denver, Enid and Gulf Railroad.
- Houstin James, father of author Marquis James.
- Fred C. Gensman, founder of Gensman Hardware Store, a downtown staple on the square for almost eighty years, President of the Enid Cemetery Association.
- Jack H. Pellow, stonecutter who worked on Grant's tomb, founder of Pellow Monument Works in 1911 which provides headstones for local burials.
- James Yancy Callahan, Oklahoma Territorial Delegate to the U.S. House of Representatives
- Robert M. Blair, Civil War Congressional Medal of Honor Recipient
