= Ed Long (politician) =

American politician and businessman

Member of the Oklahoma Senate from the 19th district
- In office 1988–1996
- Preceded by: Norman A. Lamb
- Succeeded by: Robert Milacek

Edwin Eugene Long (September 4, 1934 – October 12, 2017) was an American politician and businessman.

Long was born in Garber, Oklahoma and graduated from Garber High School. He then received his bachelor's degree in agricultural education from Oklahoma State University in 1956. Long moved to Enid, Oklahoma and owned several John Deere dealerships. Long served in the Oklahoma Senate from 1988 to 1996 and was a Democrat. After his retirement, Long moved to Stillwater, Oklahoma. He died in Stillwater, Oklahoma.
