= North Central Oklahoma Cactus Botanical Garden =

Botanical garden in Covington, Oklahoma, United States

Coordinates: 36°18′22″N 97°35′22″W

- Interactive map of North Central Oklahoma Cactus Botanical Garden
- Type: Botanical garden
- Species: 1,500

North Central Oklahoma Cactus Botanical Garden is a botanical garden located at 308 West Main, Covington, Oklahoma. The garden includes over 1,500 types of rare and exotic cacti and succulents.

== See also ==
- List of botanical gardens and arboretums in the United States
