= Patrick Anderson (Oklahoma politician) =

Republican United States politician

Member of the Oklahoma Senate from the 19th district
- In office November 17, 2004 – November 22, 2016
- Preceded by: Robert Milacek
- Succeeded by: Roland Pederson

Personal details
- Born: Enid, Oklahoma, U.S.
- Party: Republican
- Website: Senator Anderson's Senate Website

Patrick Anderson is an American politician who served in the Oklahoma Senate representing the 19th district from 2004 to 2016.

== Biography ==
Patrick Anderson served in the Oklahoma Senate as a member of the Republican Party representing the 19th district from 2004 to 2016.

Anderson opposed the legalization of medical marijuana in Oklahoma.

== Election results ==
November 2, 2004, Election results for Oklahoma State Senator for District 19
Candidates	Party	Votes	%
PATRICK ANDERSON	Republican Party	19,426	67.76%
JIM STATES	Democratic Party	9,244	32.24%
