= Garber, Oklahoma =

- City
- Location in Garfield County and the state of Oklahoma.
- Coordinates: 36°26′12″N 97°34′52″W
- Country: United States
- State: Oklahoma
- County: Garfield

Area
  - Total: 0.51 sq mi (1.31 km^{2})
  - Land: 0.51 sq mi (1.31 km^{2})
  - Water: 0 sq mi (0.00 km^{2})
- Elevation: 1,175 ft (358 m)

Population (2020)
  - Total: 725
  - Density: 1,431.6/sq mi (552.73/km^{2})
- Time zone: UTC-6 (Central (CST))
  - Summer (DST): UTC-5 (CDT)
- ZIP code: 73738
- Area code: 580
- FIPS code: 40-28500
- GNIS feature ID: 2410566

Garber is a city in Garfield County, Oklahoma, United States. As of the 2020 census, Garber had a population of 725. The city is named after Martin Garber, father of Milton C. Garber, former U.S. congressman, Enid mayor, newspaper editor, and judge. The land was previously part of the Cherokee Outlet, until the U.S. government declared it open to non-Indian settlement in 1893.

== History ==
The Garber family participated in the Land Run of 1893, claiming 160 acres (0.65 km^{2}) of land that would become the city of Garber. The Enid & Tonkawa Railway built a line in 1899 that ran from North Enid to Billings, near the brothers' land. In October 1899, the Garber Town Company, owned by brothers Milton C. and Burton A. Garber, platted the town. Burton Garber was part-owner of the Garber Oil Company.

Ed Long (1934-2017), Oklahoma state senator and businessman, was born in Garber.

== Geography ==
Garber is located in eastern Garfield County, 19 miles (31 km) east of Enid, the county seat. Oklahoma State Highways 15 and 74 pass together through the west side of the city, with Highway 74 leading north 18 miles (29 km) to Lamont and south 9 miles (14 km) to Covington. Highway 15 leads south and west to Enid, and north and east 15 miles (24 km) to Billings.

According to the United States Census Bureau, Garber has a total area of 0.50 square miles (1.3 km^{2}), all land.

== Demographics ==
Historical population
| Census | Pop. | Note | %± |
|---|---|---|---|
| 1910 | 382 | | — |
| 1920 | 1,446 | | 278.5% |
| 1930 | 1,356 | | −6.2% |
| 1940 | 1,086 | | −19.9% |
| 1950 | 957 | | −11.9% |
| 1960 | 905 | | −5.4% |
| 1970 | 1,101 | | 21.7% |
| 1980 | 992 | | −9.9% |
| 1990 | 959 | | −3.3% |
| 2000 | 845 | | −11.9% |
| 2010 | 822 | | −2.7% |
| 2020 | 725 | | −11.8% |

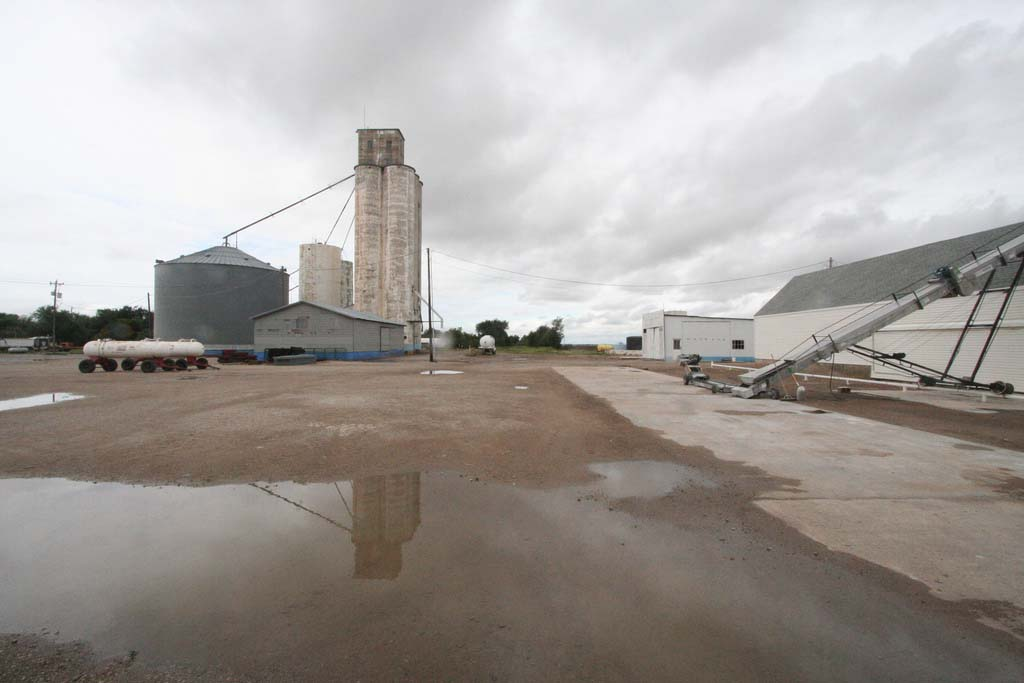
By 1905, four grain elevators served the area's prosperous wheat farmers.

=== 2020 census ===
As of the 2020 census, Garber had a population of 725. The median age was 36.5 years. 28.3% of residents were under the age of 18 and 14.9% of residents were 65 years of age or older. For every 100 females there were 100.3 males, and for every 100 females age 18 and over there were 102.3 males age 18 and over.

0% of residents lived in urban areas, while 100.0% lived in rural areas.

There were 281 households in Garber, of which 29.2% had children under the age of 18 living in them. Of all households, 44.1% were married-couple households, 22.8% were households with a male householder and no spouse or partner present, and 25.3% were households with a female householder and no spouse or partner present. About 30.2% of all households were made up of individuals and 12.1% had someone living alone who was 65 years of age or older.

There were 378 housing units, of which 25.7% were vacant. Among occupied housing units, 71.2% were owner-occupied and 28.8% were renter-occupied. The homeowner vacancy rate was 7.2% and the rental vacancy rate was 9.6%.

Racial composition as of the 2020 census
| Race | Percent |
|---|---|
| White | 84.8% |
| Black or African American | 0% |
| American Indian and Alaska Native | 2.8% |
| Asian | 0.4% |
| Native Hawaiian and Other Pacific Islander | 0.1% |
| Some other race | 0.8% |
| Two or more races | 11.0% |
| Hispanic or Latino (of any race) | 5.7% |

=== 2000 census ===
As of the 2000 census there were 845 people, 360 households, and 244 families residing in the city. The population density was 1,721.2 inhabitants per square mile (664.6/km^{2}). There were 447 housing units at an average density of 910.5 per square mile (351.5/km^{2}). The racial makeup of the city was 94.32% White, 0.24% African American, 3.20% Native American, 0.12% Asian, 0.12% from other races, and 2.01% from two or more races. Hispanic or Latino of any race were 0.24% of the population.

There were 360 households, out of which 28.3% had children under the age of 18 living with them, 53.1% were married couples living together, 10.8% had a female householder with no husband present, and 32.2% were non-families. 31.1% of all households were made up of individuals, and 16.7% had someone living alone who was 65 years of age or older. The average household size was 2.35 and the average family size was 2.93.

In the city, the population was spread out, with 25.8% under the age of 18, 7.8% from 18 to 24, 23.7% from 25 to 44, 23.2% from 45 to 64, and 19.5% who were 65 years of age or older. The median age was 39 years. For every 100 females, there were 92.5 males. For every 100 females age 18 and over, there were 88.9 males.

The median income for a household in the city was $25,000, and the median income for a family was $32,778. Males had a median income of $27,417 versus $18,750 for females. The per capita income for the city was $13,284. About 8.5% of families and 12.4% of the population were below the poverty line, including 19.5% of those under age 18 and 13.5% of those age 65 or over.

== Economy ==
Agriculture, oil, and cattle are Garber's primary industries. Petroleum drilling began as early as 1904-05. The Garber Oil and Gas Company (partly owned by Burton A. Garber) installed Garber's first gas well in 1905. The Garber Field was opened in 1916 when the Hoy well came in at two hundred barrels per day. Peak production came in November 1925, and by 1940 a well in Section 18, T22N, R3W still held a state record for initial production, 27,000 barrels per day (4,300 m^{3}/d). Booms happened again in 1925 and 1927, continuing through the 1930s. Three refineries operated by 1929. By 1920 the boom had grown Garber to an unofficial population count of 2,200 (the U.S. Census registered 1,446).

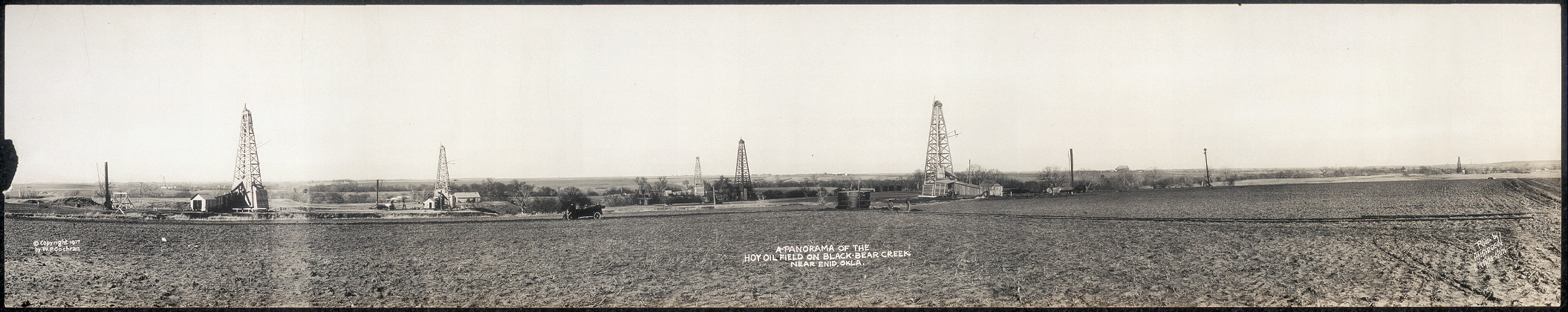
Hoy oil field, 1917

== Education ==
Its school district is Garber Public Schools.
