= Robert Milacek =

American politician (1942–2010)

Member of the Oklahoma Senate from the 19th district
- In office November 1996 – November 2004
- Preceded by: Ed Long
- Succeeded by: Patrick Anderson

Member of the Oklahoma House of Representatives from the 39th district
- In office November 1976 – November 1982
- Preceded by: Lynn Thornhill
- Succeeded by: Steven Boeckman

Personal details
- Born: January 17, 1942 Enid, Oklahoma, U.S.
- Died: March 31, 2010 (aged 68) Enid, Oklahoma, U.S.
- Party: Republican
- Education: Panhandle State University; Phillips University

Robert Milacek (January 17, 1942 – March 31, 2010) was an American politician who served in the Oklahoma Senate representing the 19th district from 1996 to 2004 and the Oklahoma House of Representatives representing the 39th district from 1976 to 1982.

== Biography ==
Robert Milacek was born on January 17, 1942, in Enid, Oklahoma, to Charles V. Milacek and Anna Semrad. He graduated from Waukomis High School in 1960, Panhandle State University in 1965, and Phillips University. He married Linda Petersen on January 25, 1964, and the couple had three children. He taught for Owasso Public Schools and in Waukomis, Oklahoma.

Milacek was served in the Oklahoma House of Representatives as a member of the Republican Party representing the 39th district from 1976 to 1982. He was preceded in office by Lynn Thornhill and succeeded by Steven Boeckman. He was later elected to the Oklahoma Senate representing the 19th district from 1996 to 2004. He was preceded in office by Ed Long and succeeded by Patrick Anderson. He did not seek reelection in 2004. He died on March 31, 2010, in Enid, Oklahoma.
