= Railroad Museum of Oklahoma =

Railroad museum in Enid, Oklahoma, United States

Coordinates: 36°24′14″N 97°52′55″W

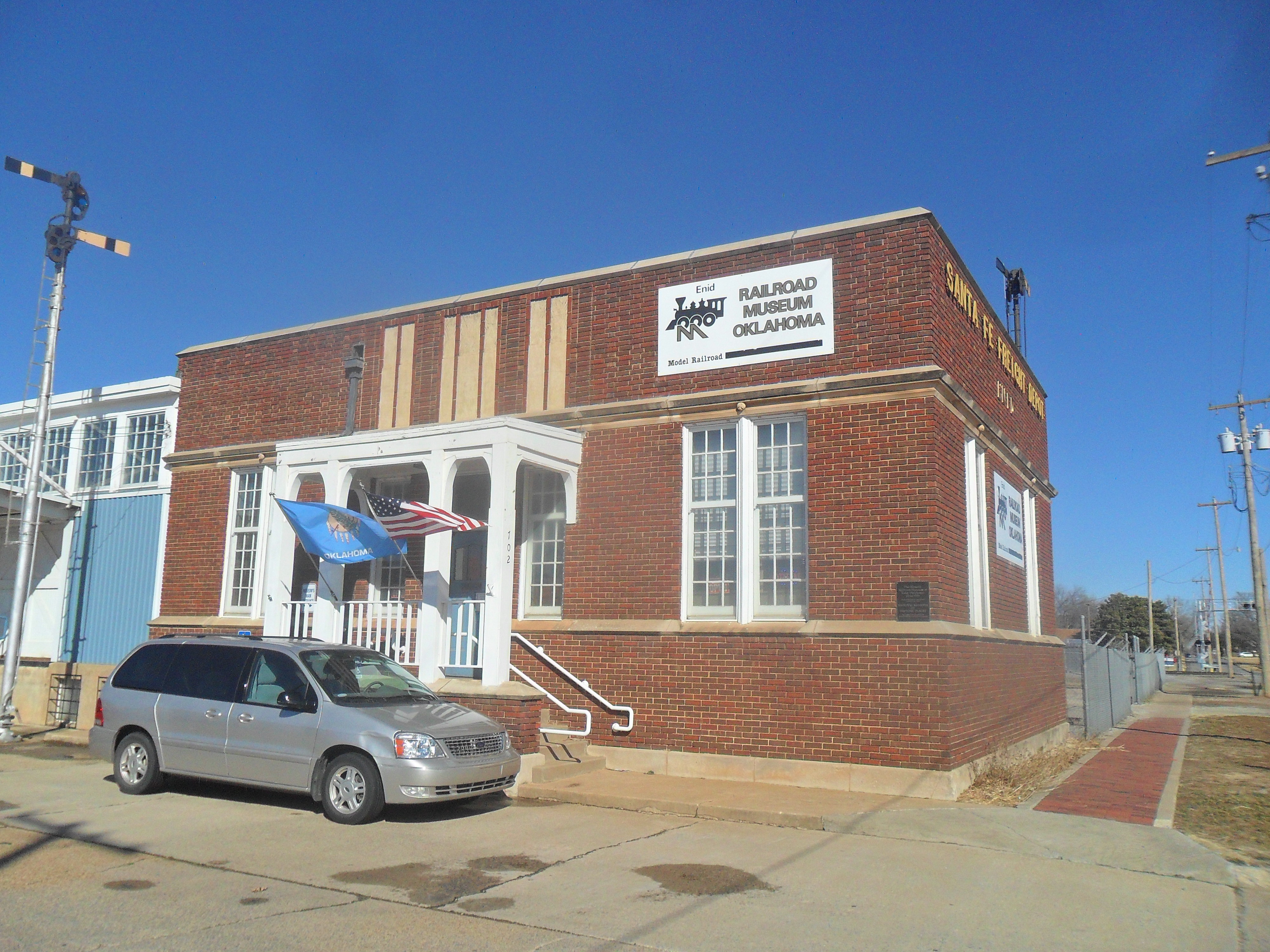
- Established: April 27, 1989
- Location: 702 N Washington St, Enid, Oklahoma
- Director: Frank W. Campbell

The Railroad Museum of Oklahoma is a railroad museum located in the former Atchison, Topeka and Santa Fe Railway freight depot in Enid, Oklahoma. The museum began in 1977 and is a non-profit operated by the Enid chapter of the National Railway Historical Society. The freight depot was listed on the National Register of Historic Places in 2015.

The museum's collection includes two rooms of operating HO and N-gauge model railroads, a reference library, dining car china, and other railroad artifacts. Engines and rolling stock in its collection include the Frisco 1519 steam locomotive, an operational 50-ton G.E. switcher locomotive, nine authentic cabooses, five different kinds of boxcars, twelve different types of freight cars, two types of flatcars, a three-dome tank car, a railway post office car, and a former Amtrak lounge car that is now used as a dining car. The museum also leads bi-annual trips utilizing its cabooses from historical Enid area rail service.

The museum is built next to a freight yard.

== Rolling stock (partial) ==
- Frisco 1519
- ATSF 999567
- Union Pacific 25323
- M-K-T (Katy) 132
- Burlington Northern 12433 and 12181
- Army medical service car 89526
- Missouri Pacific caboose 13724

== See also ==
- Enid City Railway
- Blackwell, Enid and Southwestern Railway
- Enid and Anadarko Railway
- Enid and Tonkawa Railway
- Enid Central Railway
- Denver, Enid and Gulf Railroad
- Enid-Pond Creek Railroad War
- National Register of Historic Places listings in Garfield County, Oklahoma
