= The Life of Andrew Jackson (James book) =

1930s two-volume biography

Andrew Jackson: The Border Captain (1933) and Andrew Jackson: Portrait of a President (1937), written by Marquis James and published by Bobbs-Merrill, are two volumes of a two-part biography of seventh United States president Andrew Jackson. The Border Captain leaves off in 1821, and Portrait of a President covers from 1822 (age 55) until Jackson's death in 1845. The two-volume biography shared the Pulitzer Prize for Biography in 1938. The two volumes were published in 1938 as one 1080-page volume under the title The Life of Andrew Jackson.

== The Border Captain (1933) ==
Andrew Jackson: The Border Captain
- Author: Marquis James
- Language: English
- Genre: Biography
- Published: 1933
- Publisher: Bobbs-Merrill
- OCLC: 1417870
- Dewey Decimal: 973.56092 B
- LC Class: E382 .J26

The New York Times review described James's rendition of young Jackson as a prosperous sort of frontiersman, and reported "that while some facts make it hard to believe that the first marriage, contracted before Rachel had been divorced from her first husband, was an entirely innocent mistake, [James'] other and stronger facts prove that it was." The New Yorker reviewer commented about The Border Captain that "our attention is kept almost too firmly focussed on the man alone, and indeed there are times—as in the sections dealing with the Burr conspiracy and with the activities leading up to the War of 1812—when, through omitting a larger consideration of the background of events, Mr. James seems to leave his central figure gesturing against vacancy. But this is a small matter when set against the excellence of the book as a whole."

== Portrait of a President (1937) ==
Andrew Jackson: Portrait of a President
- Author: Marquis James
- Language: English
- Genre: Biography
- Published: 1937
- Publisher: Bobbs-Merrill
- OCLC: 1065860
- Dewey Decimal: 973.56092 B
- LC Class: E382 .J27

James characterized Jackson as a man of "fewer personal ambitions than any man excepting Washington" and traced his career as an arc from "frontier conservative" to "national liberal". One reviewer characterized it as a staunchly Jacksonian book that "does not hesitate to take sides with Old Hickory. [James] explicitly absolves Jackson and his bank policy from responsibility for the panic of 1837. He has only admiration for the firm and even belligerent stand taken by Jackson toward France when that country failed to make payment in cash that had been pledged in an agreement for spoliation claims arising out of the Napoleonic period." The book, while nominally about Jackson's political career, includes extensive detail on Jackson's personal life (as was James' standard biographical style), specifically on his late life "his battle against ill health, debts incurred by impecunious kinsfolk, and unhappy consequences of his oft ill-deserved but steadfast devotion and unwavering loyalty to family and friends".

The book was viewed as a refutation of the scholarship of Thomas Abernethy, who characterized as Jackson more or less corrupt. An academic review published in 1938 found it adequate, if not flattering, in matters personal, as well in examining "amazing breadth and keenness of mind with which the old man grasped what was going on" in regard to the American ambition to acquire Texas, but lacking in coverage of more convoluted issues such as the Maysville Road bill veto and Henry Clay's land distribution bill, the Tennessee opposition to Jackson including Hugh Lawson White and Whig leader John Bell, the Webster-Ashburton treaty, Jackson's "exposition of democratic principles written upon the occasion of the Dorr Rebellion in Rhode Island; and his caustic denunciation of the defeat by the Senate of Henry Wheaton's Zollverein treaty".

The Atlantic reviewer, U.S. senator Bennett Champ Clark, noted that James was "guilty of such minor mistakes as his persistent reference to Charles Dickinson, who was killed by Jackson, as John Dickinson". The Atlantic was also skeptical of James' framing of the 1824 presidential election, namely that "Mr. James adopts the conventional theory of a blunt old soldier forced into an unfamiliar contest as the tool of certain designing political friends whose machinations he was unable to resist. This view ignores certain most important facts. While it is true that Jackson had spoken longingly of retirement after his military and Floridan adventures and that Mrs. Jackson undoubtedly wished him to remain at home, the expressions of each were not dissimilar to those which both had been indulging for years and which Jackson continued to use for years after her death."

== Legacy ==
In 1986, historian Donald B. Cole wrote that James' two-volume biography of Jackson, though Pulitzer Prize-winning, failed to supersede biographies by James Parton and John Spencer Bassett because James was "content to portray Jackson as a man on horseback."

== Sources ==
- Cole, Donald B. (September 1985). "Honoring Andrew Jackson Before All Other Living Men". Reviews in American History. 13 (3). Baltimore, Maryland: The Johns Hopkins University Press: 359–366. doi:10.2307/2702090. ISSN 0048-7511. JSTOR 2702090.
