= Waverley Historic District (Enid, Oklahoma) =

Historic district in Oklahoma, United States

- U.S. National Register of Historic Places
- U.S. Historic district
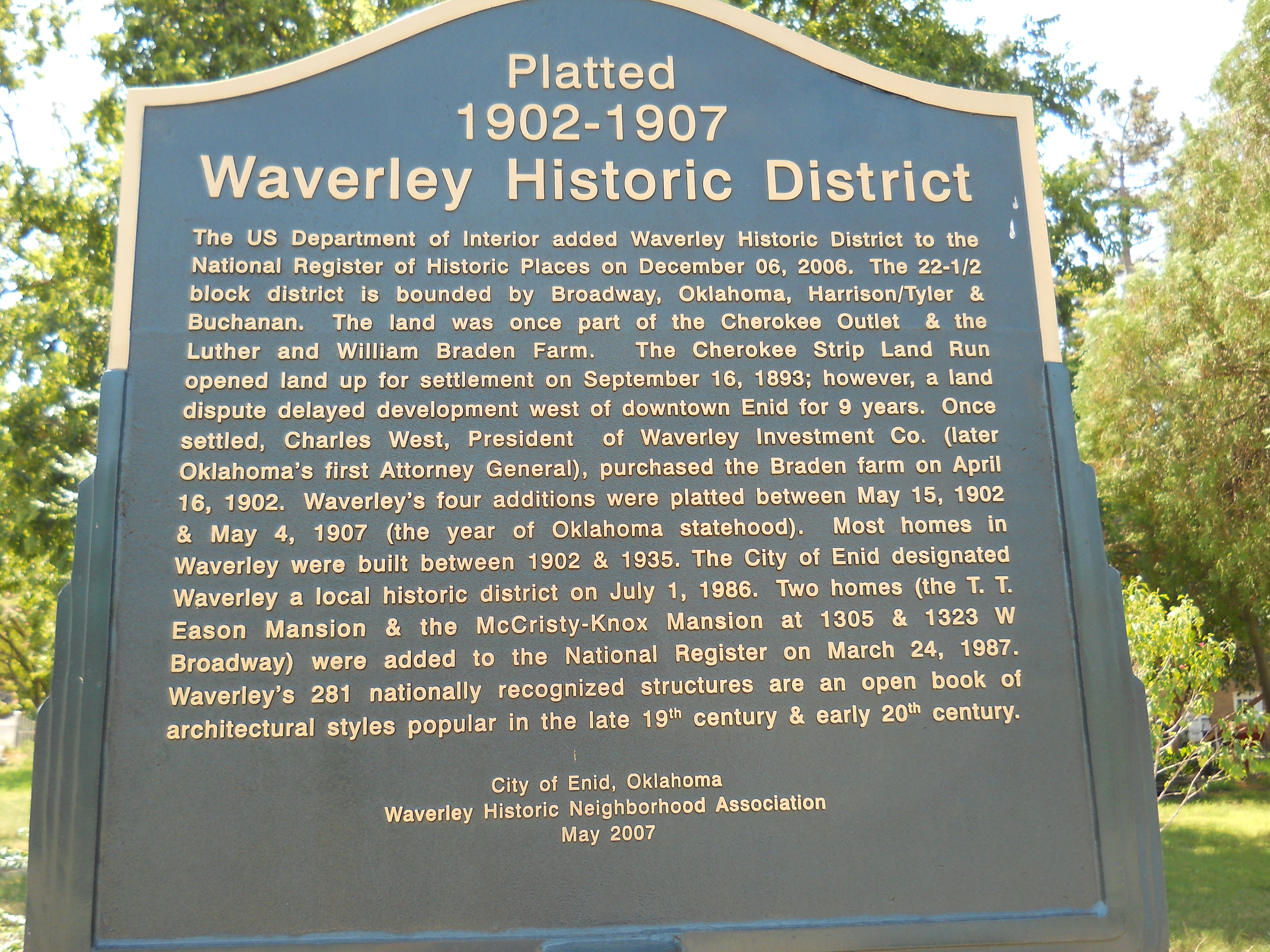

- Location within Oklahoma
- Location: Bounded by W. Broadway Avenue, N. and S. Tyler Street, S. Harrison Street, W. Oklahoma Street, and N. and S. Buchanan Streets, Enid, Oklahoma
- Coordinates: 36°23′48″N 97°53′44″W
- Architect: R.W. Shaw, A.A. Crowell
- Architectural style: Queen Anne cottages, Folk Victorian houses, Colonial Revival houses, Craftsman Bungalow and Prairie School Foursquare Houses, Tudor Revival, Neoclassical, Italian Renaissance, and Spanish Eclectic
- NRHP reference No.: 06001110
- Added to NRHP: 2006

- T.T Eason Mansion
- U.S. National Register of Historic Places
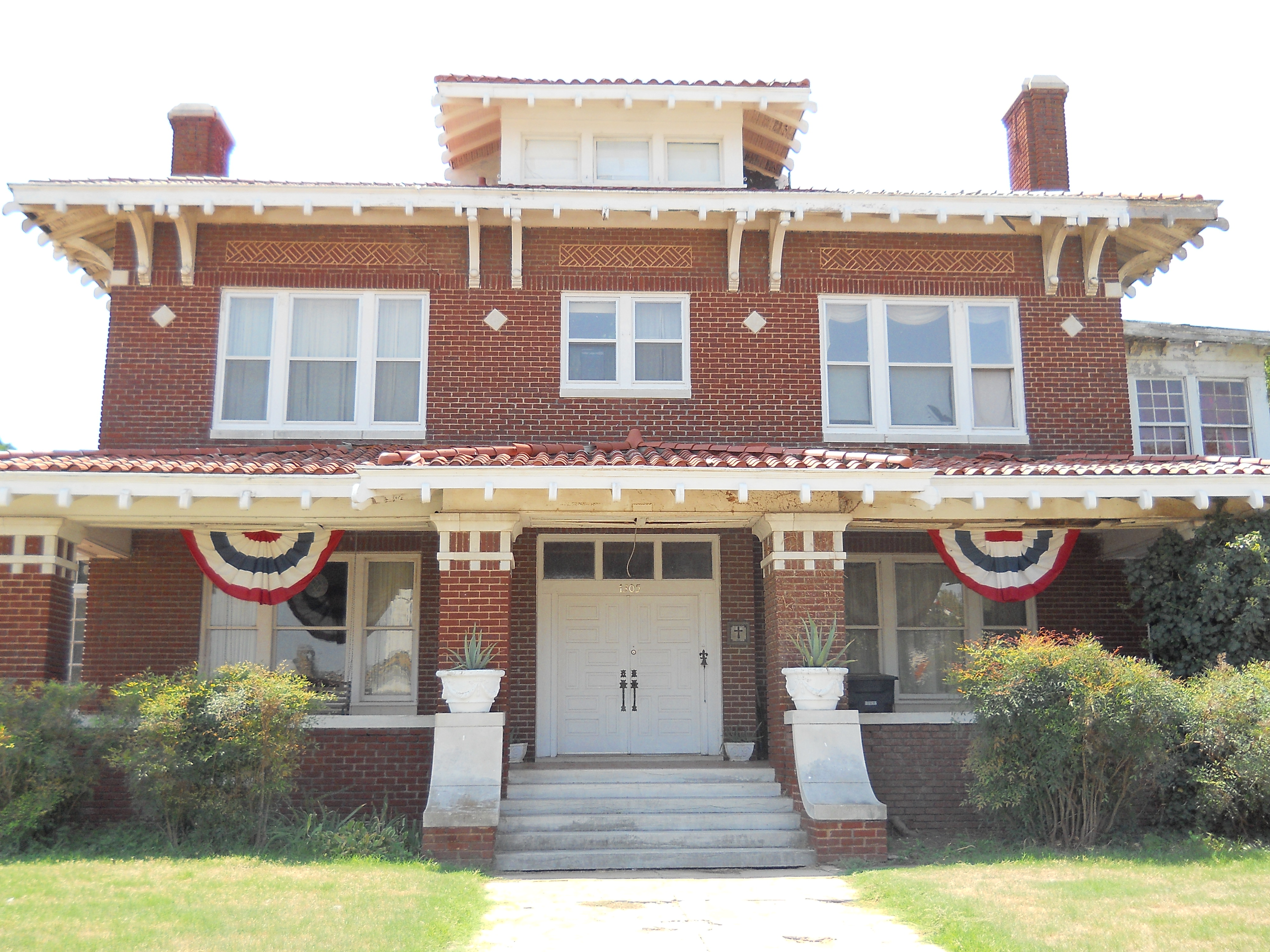
- Location: 1305 West Broadway, Enid, Oklahoma
- Built: 1916
- Architectural style: Prairie Box
- NRHP reference No.: 87000417
- Added to NRHP: 1987

- McChristy-Knox-Hedges Mansion
- U.S. National Register of Historic Places
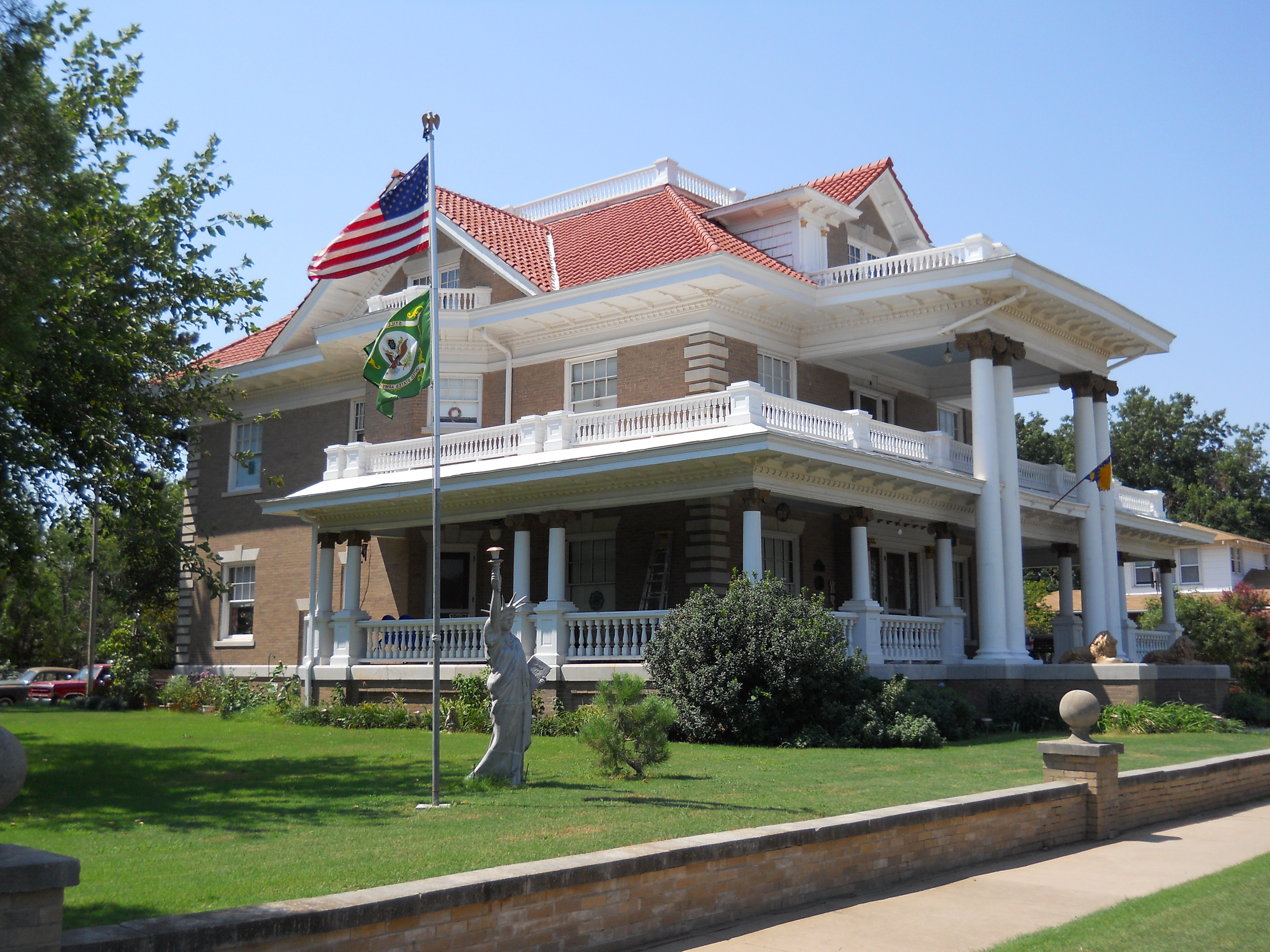
- Location: 1323 West Broadway, Enid, Oklahoma
- Built: 1909
- Architect: R.W. Shaw
- Architectural style: Neoclassical
- NRHP reference No.: 87000418
- Added to NRHP: 1987

The Waverley Historic District is located in Enid, Oklahoma, and has been listed on the National Register of Historic Places (NRHP) since 2006. It consists of four Waverley additions. The William and Luther Braden farm was the first parcel of land to be platted by the Waverley Development Company in May 1902. Subsequent additions were platted in 1905, 1906, and 1907. The District has 275 buildings built between 1895 and 1935. Architectural styles in the district include Queen Anne cottages, Folk Victorian houses, Colonial Revival houses, Craftsman Bungalow and Prairie School Foursquare Houses. There are also a few Tudor Revival, Neoclassical, Italian Renaissance, and Spanish Eclectic homes.

The T. T. Eason Mansion (36°23′47″N 97°53′38″W) and the McCristy-Knox Mansion (36°23′47″N 97°53′40″W) are also located within the district, and were both owned by wealthy oilmen. Both of these mansions were listed on the NRHP in 1987. T.T. Eason of Eason Oil Company purchased his house following original owner John W. Graham's death. Graham had the Prairie Box style house constructed in 1916, and Eason lived in it from 1923 to 1935. Charles E. Knox, who owned a refinery in Covington, Oklahoma, purchased his mansion from Joseph McCristy, president of the Enid Mill and Grain Company. The mansion was built in 1909 in the Neo-Classical style and designed by R.W. Shaw. Knox also owned another site listed on the National Register of Historic Places, the Knox Building. Musician Michael Hedges also lived in the house with his family.
