= Marquis James =

American historian (1891–1955)

Marquis James (August 29, 1891 – November 19, 1955) was an American author and journalist, twice awarded the Pulitzer Prize for his works The Raven: A Biography of Sam Houston and The Life of Andrew Jackson.

== Early life and education ==
Marquis James was born on August 29, 1891, in Springfield, Missouri, the fifth child and only son of Houstin James (December 18, 1844, Pike Co., Ohio – August 18, 1908, Enid, Oklahoma), a lawyer, and Rachel Leo Marquis (July 14, 1848, Jay Co., Indiana – May 22, 1930, Enid, Oklahoma), a schoolteacher (daughter of Dr. James Marquis and Mary Cosner). Houstin, a Civil War veteran, participated in both the Land Rush of 1889 and the Land Run of 1893. While unsuccessful in 1889, Houstin successfully staked a claim southeast of Enid, Oklahoma in the 1893 run and moved his family there. Marquis James was educated at East Hill School and Central, and graduated Enid High School in 1910. He attended one year of college at Oklahoma Christian University (later Phillips University).

== Career ==
During high school Marquis James helped found the Quill, Enid's student newspaper. He became a reporter for Enid Events at 14. James worked for many of the local papers including Wave Democrat, Enid Morning News, and the Enid Daily Eagle. He also sent Enid related articles to the Wichita Eagle and The Oklahoman. Following high school he worked at various newspapers across the country, including as a rewrite editor for the New York Tribune in 1916.

From 1916 to 1918, Marquis James appeared with short stories and serials in the Chicago Ledger.

James served as an Army captain in the First World War, in France from 1917 to 1919. Following his military service, he became National Director of Publicity for the American Legion and worked on the staff at the American Legion Monthly from 1923 to 1932. James also contributed work to The New Yorker, occasionally using the pseudonym "Quid".

== Personal life and death ==
James married fellow reporter Bessie Williams Rowland in 1914. The two collaborated on children's books based on James' Pulitzer Prize–winning biographies. They had one daughter, Cynthia. After 38 years of marriage, James and Rowland divorced in 1952. James married Jacqueline Mary Parsons in 1954. Marquis James died suddenly at the age of sixty-four of a cerebral hemorrhage on November 19, 1955. He was working on a biography of Booker T. Washington at the time of his death. The Public Library of Enid and Garfield County dedicated the Marquis James room to him in 1964 which contains artifacts relating to James' life and career; in 2016 the library was designated a National Literary Landmark in his honor.

== Bibliography ==
=== Books ===
- James, Marquis (1923). A history of the American Legion. New York: W. Green.
- — (1929). The Raven : a biography of Sam Houston. Indianapolis: Bobbs-Merrill.
- — (1933). Andrew Jackson : the border captain. Indianapolis: Bobbs-Merrill.
- — (1926). They had their hour. Indianapolis: Bobbs-Merrill.
- — (1937). Andrew Jackson : portrait of a president. Indianapolis: Bobbs-Merrill.
- — (1937). The life of Andrew Jackson. Indianapolis: Bobbs-Merrill.
- — (1939). Mr. Garner of Texas. Indianapolis: Bobbs-Merrill.
- Alfred I. DuPont, The Family Rebel (1941)
- Biography of a Business, 1792-1942 (1943)
- The Cherokee Strip: A Tale of an Oklahoma Boyhood (1945)
- The Metropolitan Life: A Study in Business Growth (1947)
- Merchant Adventurer: The Story of W.R. Grace (completed 1948, published 1993)
- The Texaco Story, The First Fifty Years: 1902-1952 (1953)
- Biography of a Bank: The Story of Bank of America, with his wife Bessie R. James (1954)

=== Articles ===
- Quid (February 21, 1925). "Washington notes". The New Yorker. Vol. 1, no. 1. p. 24.
- — (February 28, 1925). "Princess Alice". Profiles. The New Yorker. Vol. 1, no. 2. pp. 9–10. Profile of Alice Roosevelt Longworth.
- — (February 28, 1925). "Washington notes". The New Yorker. Vol. 1, no. 2. p. 28.
- — (March 7, 1925). "Washington notes". The New Yorker. Vol. 1, no. 3. p. 31.
- M. J. (March 21, 1925). "$10—CASH—$5!". The New Yorker. Vol. 1, no. 5. p. 20.
- Quid (March 21, 1925). "Points West". New York, Etc. The New Yorker. Vol. 1, no. 5. p. 23.
- — (March 28, 1925). "Points West". New York, Etc. The New Yorker. Vol. 1, no. 6. p. 23.
- — (April 4, 1925). "A gentleman with two cauliflower ears". Profiles. The New Yorker. Vol. 1, no. 7. pp. 9–10. Profile of John H. Craige.
- — (April 4, 1925). "Washington". New York, Etc. The New Yorker. Vol. 1, no. 7. pp. 24–25.
- M. J. (April 11, 1925). "The great open spaces". New York, Etc. The New Yorker. Vol. 1, no. 8. p. 24.
- Quid (April 18, 1925). "This week's award". The New Yorker. Topic: Mayor John Hylan.
- — (July 11, 1925). "Dayton, Tennessee". The New Yorker. Topic: Scopes Trial.
- — (July 18, 1925). "Swampscott correspondence". The New Yorker.
- — (August 29, 1925). "A Life Briefly Extolled". The New Yorker.
- — (September 12, 1925). "Essence of the campaign". The New Yorker.
- — (December 5, 1925). "Lawndale's fast set". The New Yorker.
- — (February 6, 1926). "Lawndale's winter sports". The New Yorker.
- — (December 3, 1938). "That was New York". The New Yorker. Topics: Astor Place Riot, Edward Z. C. Judson
- — (May 27, 1950). "Amplification". The New Yorker. Topics: Casey Jones, railroads, folklore.
