= Public Library of Enid and Garfield County =

American public library

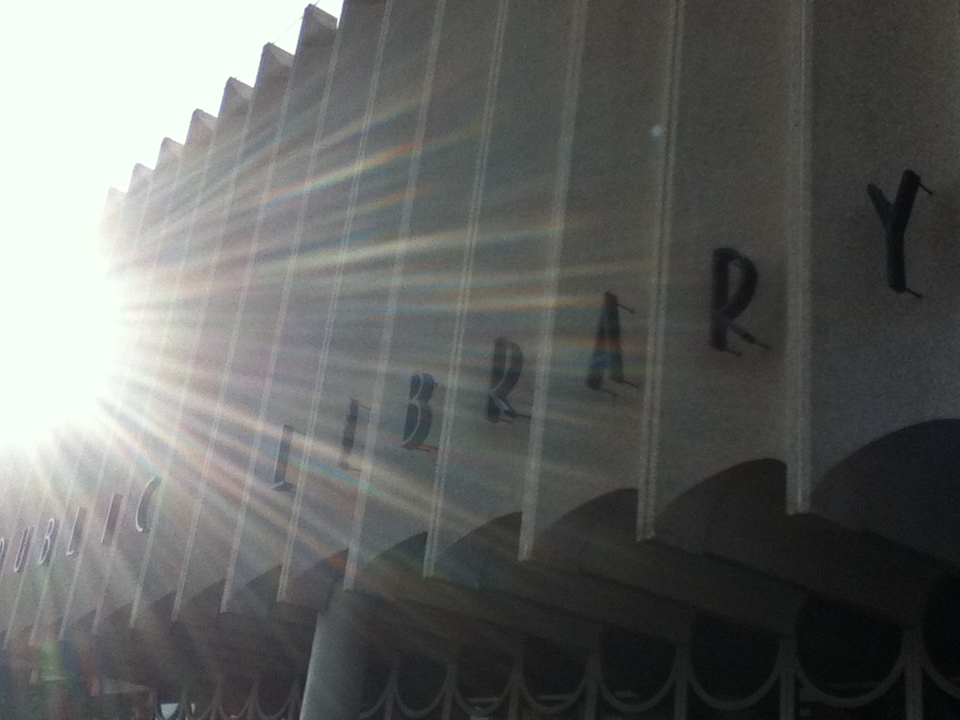
- Sun shines outside of the Public Library of Enid and Garfield County.
- 36°23′45″N 97°52′45″W
- Location: 120 W Maine Ave, Enid, Oklahoma 73701
- Established: 1899

Other information
- Website: City of Enid Oklahoma: Library

The Public Library of Enid and Garfield County, is a public library located in Enid, Oklahoma, the county seat of Garfield County, Oklahoma.

== History ==
The library began as a one-room library in the Patrick and Bray building on the downtown square sponsored by the Enid Study Club in late 1900. In 1905, the city of Enid acquired the library. In May 1909 Enid received a $25,000 grant from the Andrew Carnegie Foundation to build a Carnegie library. The Enid Carnegie Library was a Mission Revival style building designed by A. A. Crowell and built by DC Bass and Sons Construction. The Enid Library merged with the Garfield County Library in 1960. By the late 1950s the library system had outgrown the Carnegie library, storing 60,000 books in a facility that was built to hold 20,000 books, and the building itself was falling into desrepair as the oldest government building in the city. It was located at 402 N. Independence, and was in operation from October 8, 1910 until October 18, 1964, when a new mid-century modern style building was opened at 120 W. Maine, the library's current location. Following years of vacancy, the Carnegie library was demolished in 1972, and is now a vacant lot. In 2010, the library underwent renovations modeled after the San Jose Public Library System. The library building was listed on the National Register of Historic Places in 2015. The Enid and Garfield Library made national headlines in 2022 when the library board enacted a policy that banned displays about gender and sexuality, and as result meetings of a local romance book club.

== Gallery ==
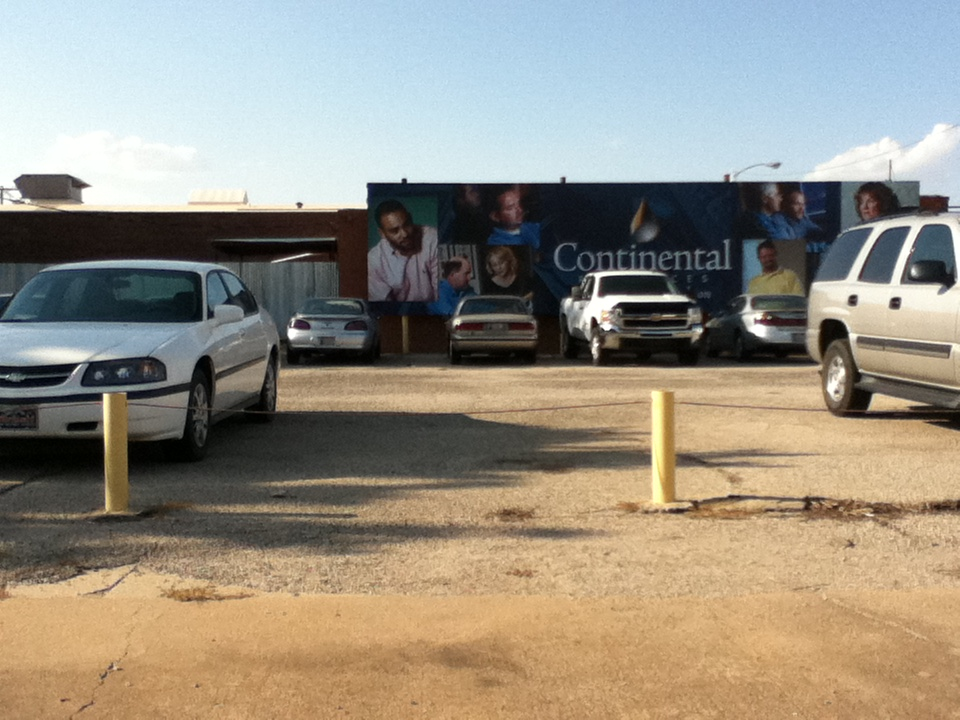
402 N. Independence, former location of Enid's Carnegie Library.

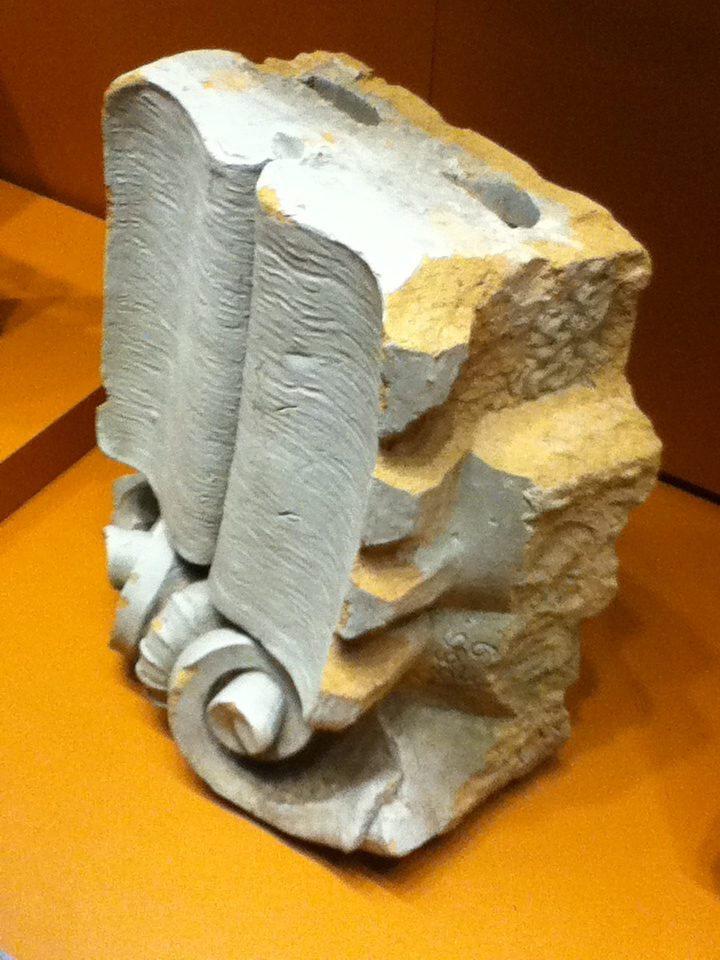
A piece of Enid's Carnegie Library sits on display in the Cherokee Strip Regional Heritage Center

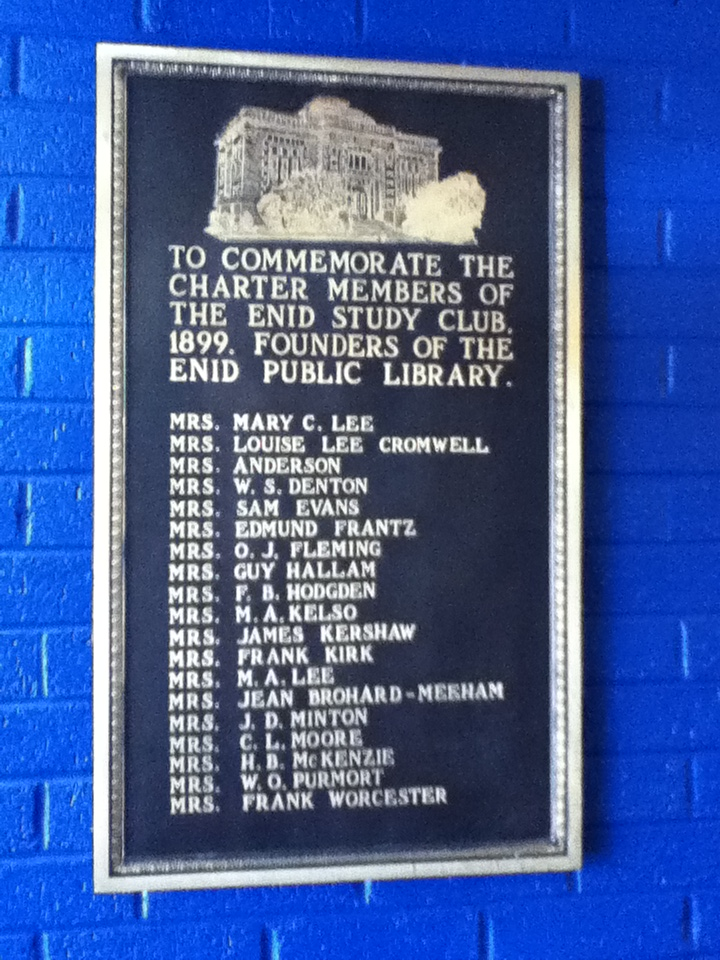
The members of the Enid Study Club, the women who founded the library in 1899.

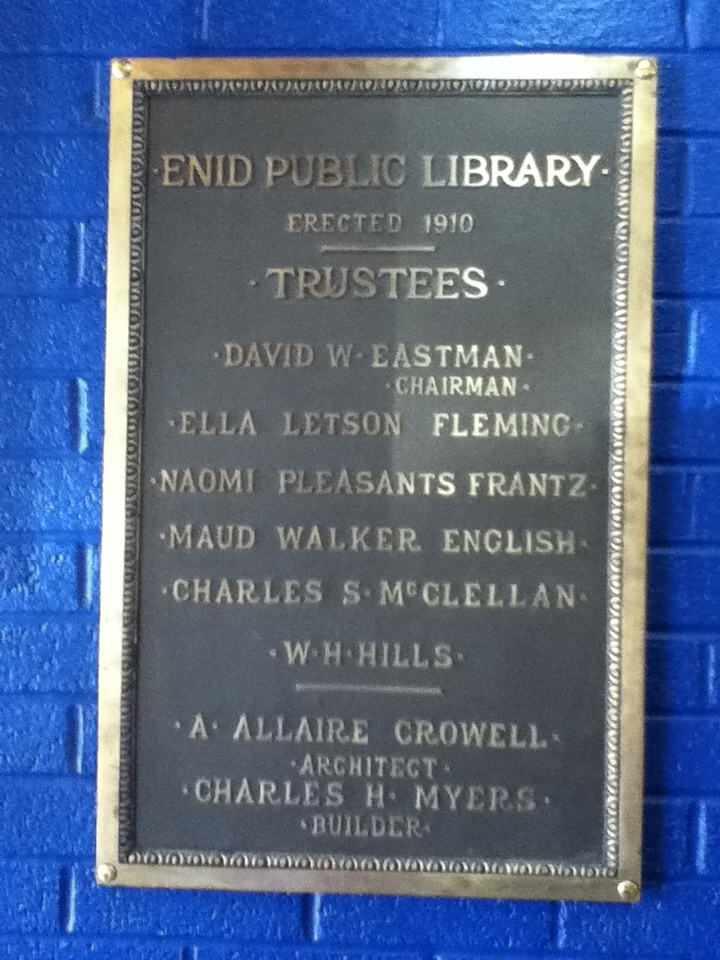
Plaque from 1910 details the architects, trustees of the library.

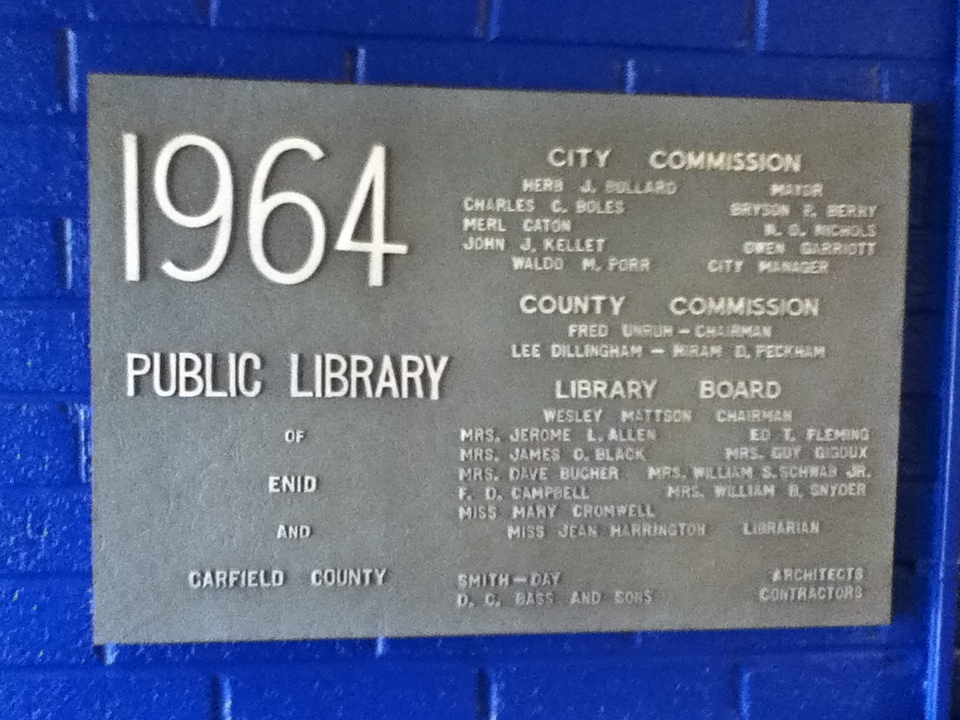
Plaque from 1964 details those involved in creating the new building.

== See also ==
- National Register of Historic Places listings in Garfield County, Oklahoma
- List of Carnegie libraries in Oklahoma
