= Clay Hall =

- U.S. National Register of Historic Places
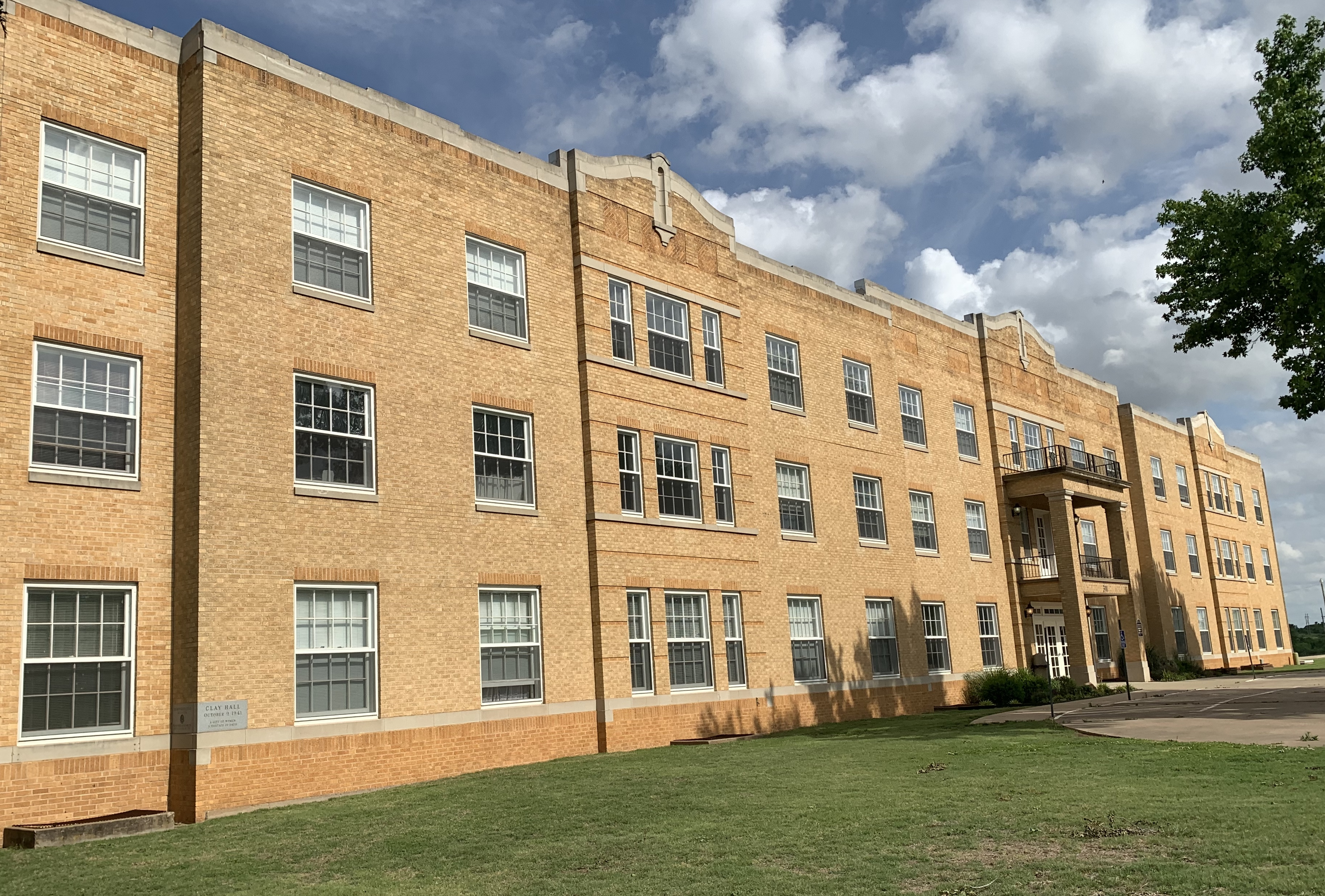

- Location within Oklahoma Location within the United States
- Location: 300 Lakeview Dr. Enid, Oklahoma
- Coordinates: 36°23′32.928″N 97°50′48.077″W
- Built: 1941
- Architect: R.W. Shaw
- Architectural style: Mission Revival
- NRHP reference No.: 12000346
- Added to NRHP: June 20, 2012

Clay Hall is a mid-twentieth century women's dormitory located on the campus of Northern Oklahoma College in Enid, Oklahoma that has been listed on the National Register of Historic Places since 2012. Architect Roy W. Shaw designed it for Phillips University in 1941. The building was named after Robert Henry Clay, the husband of Sadie Clay, who had given a $25,000 donation to the project.

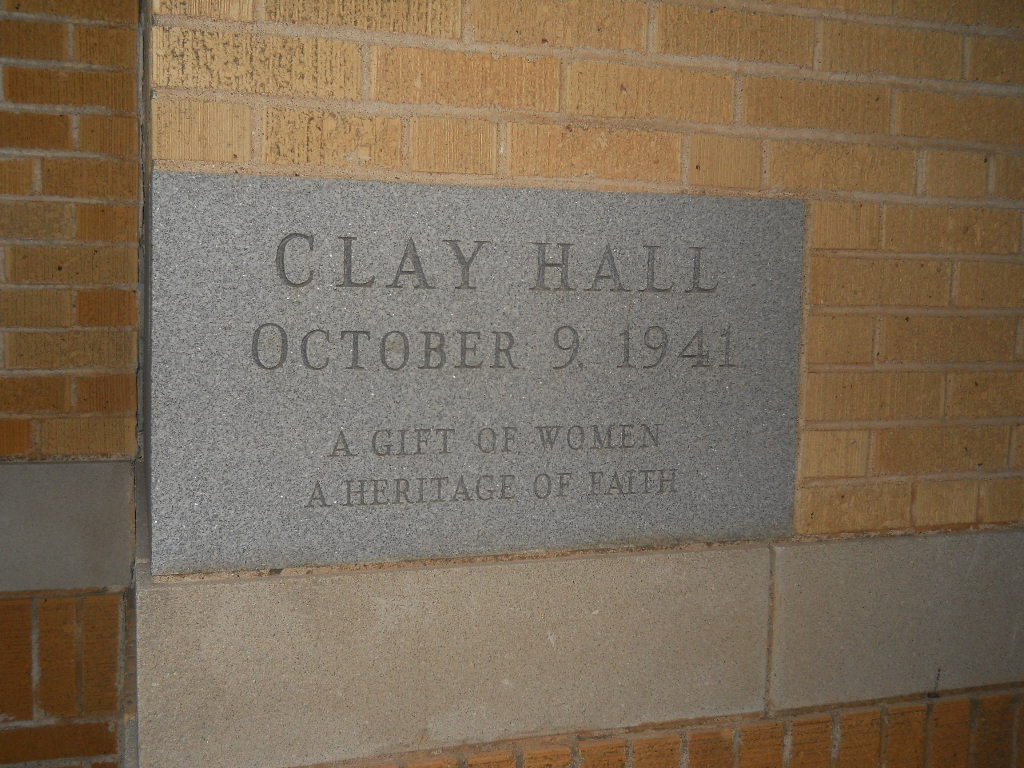
Clay Hall Dormitory Cornerstone

A cornerstone ceremony was held on October 9, 1941. Mefford construction had completed the exterior by 1942, and the interior was completed in 1946, having been delayed by the onset of World War II. The dormitory cost $175,000 to build, and the University held a dedication ceremony on October 11, 1946. In 1951 and 1959, a north and a south wing were added to the building in order to accommodate an expanding student population. These additional wings increased Clay Hall's residential space from 150 women to 258, and its building size to 59,000 square feet. Phillips University's enrollment peaked in the 1970s, and the dormitory closed briefly in 1985, was reopened in 1986, and then permanently shut down in 1987. Clay Hall is the oldest dormitory on the campus. Its predecessor, Athenian Hall, was demolished in 1952, and a men's dormitory, Earl Butts Hall, was completed in 1955.
