= Covington, Oklahoma =

- Town
- Location in Garfield County and the state of Oklahoma
- Coordinates: 36°18′27″N 97°35′11″W
- Country: United States
- State: Oklahoma
- County: Garfield

Area
  - Total: 0.50 sq mi (1.30 km^{2})
  - Land: 0.50 sq mi (1.30 km^{2})
  - Water: 0 sq mi (0.00 km^{2})
- Elevation: 1,145 ft (349 m)

Population (2020)
  - Total: 472
  - Density: 938.3/sq mi (362.29/km^{2})
- Time zone: UTC-6 (Central (CST))
  - Summer (DST): UTC-5 (CDT)
- ZIP code: 73730
- Area code: 580
- FIPS code: 40-17700
- GNIS feature ID: 2412378
- Website: covington.municipalimpact.com

Covington is a town in Garfield County, Oklahoma, United States. The population was 477 at the 2020 census.

== Geography ==
Covington is located in southeastern Garfield County. Oklahoma State Highway 74 passes through the center of town as First Street, leading north 9 miles (14 km) to Garber and south 63 miles (101 km) to Oklahoma City. Enid, the Garfield County seat, is 23 miles (37 km) to the northwest via OK 74 and U.S. Route 412. Oklahoma State Highway 164 leads southeast, then east 18 miles (29 km) to Perry.

According to the United States Census Bureau, Covington has a total area of 0.42 square miles (1.1 km^{2}), all land.

== Demographics ==
Historical population
Census	Pop.	Note	%±
1910	183		—
1920	1,283		601.1%
1930	927		−27.7%
2000	553		—
2010	527		−4.7%
2020	472		−10.4%
2020

=== 2020 census ===
As of the 2020 census, Covington had a population of 472. The median age was 40.2 years. 28.0% of residents were under the age of 18 and 16.1% of residents were 65 years of age or older. For every 100 females there were 101.7 males, and for every 100 females age 18 and over there were 92.1 males age 18 and over.

0.0% of residents lived in urban areas, while 100.0% lived in rural areas.

There were 187 households in Covington, of which 34.2% had children under the age of 18 living in them. Of all households, 43.9% were married-couple households, 17.6% were households with a male householder and no spouse or partner present, and 31.6% were households with a female householder and no spouse or partner present. About 27.2% of all households were made up of individuals and 11.8% had someone living alone who was 65 years of age or older.

There were 221 housing units, of which 15.4% were vacant. The homeowner vacancy rate was 0.0% and the rental vacancy rate was 6.3%.

Racial composition as of the 2020 census
Race	Number	Percent
White	414	87.7%
Black or African American	0	0.0%
American Indian and Alaska Native	19	4.0%
Asian	1	0.2%
Native Hawaiian and Other Pacific Islander	0	0.0%
Some other race	2	0.4%
Two or more races	36	7.6%
Hispanic or Latino (of any race)	22	4.7%

=== 2000 census ===
As of the census of 2000, there were 553 people, 224 households, and 159 families residing in the town. The population density was 1,373.1 inhabitants per square mile (530.2/km^{2}). There were 259 housing units at an average density of 643.1 per square mile (248.3/km^{2}). The racial makeup of the town was 93.49% White, 3.98% Native American, 0.18% Pacific Islander, 0.18% from other races, and 2.17% from two or more races. Hispanic or Latino of any race were 1.27% of the population.

There were 224 households, out of which 36.6% had children under the age of 18 living with them, 53.6% were married couples living together, 13.8% had a female householder with no husband present, and 29.0% were non-families. 27.7% of all households were made up of individuals, and 16.1% had someone living alone who was 65 years of age or older. The average household size was 2.47 and the average family size was 3.01.

In the town, the population was spread out, with 28.4% under the age of 18, 7.6% from 18 to 24, 29.8% from 25 to 44, 17.4% from 45 to 64, and 16.8% who were 65 years of age or older. The median age was 36 years. For every 100 females, there were 93.4 males. For every 100 females age 18 and over, there were 87.7 males.

The median income for a household in the town was $26,979, and the median income for a family was $32,222. Males had a median income of $30,625 versus $13,594 for females. The per capita income for the town was $12,788. About 10.5% of families and 13.4% of the population were below the poverty line, including 19.2% of those under age 18 and 6.7% of those age 65 or over.

== Education ==
Its school district is Covington-Douglas Public Schools.

== Points of interest ==
- North Central Oklahoma Cactus Botanical Garden
- R. E. Hoy No. 1 Oil Well
