= H. H. Champlin House =

Historic house in Oklahoma, United States

- H.H. Champlin House
- U.S. National Register of Historic Places
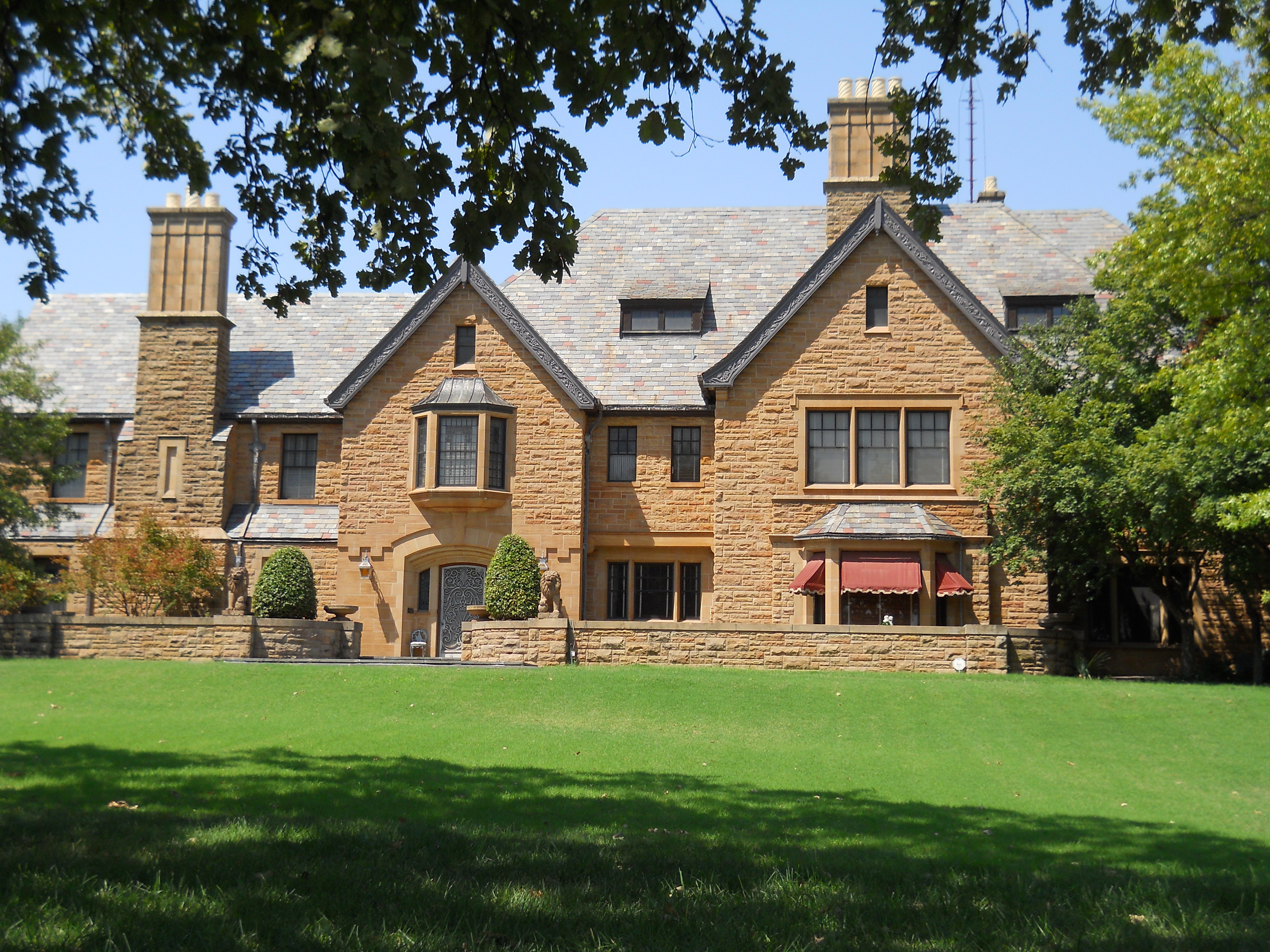

- Location within Oklahoma Location within the United States
- Location: 612 S. Tyler, Enid, Oklahoma
- Coordinates: 36°23′25″N 97°53′36″W
- Area: 3 acres (1.2 ha)
- Built: 1939
- Architect: Roy Shaw, Norris Wheeler, D.C. Bass
- Architectural style: Tudor Revival
- NRHP reference No.: 92001833
- Added to NRHP: January 21, 1993

The H.H. Champlin House is a two-and-one half-story sandstone building designed in the Tudor Revival style. The house, completed in 1939, is located at 612 S. Tyler in Enid, Oklahoma. It is located within the Kisner Heights addition to the city of Enid, developed from farmland formerly owned by R.H. Kisner. Architects Roy Shaw and Norris Wheeler designed the house. The D.C. Bass Company constructed the main house with walls of Briar Hill sandstone and Vermont slate roofing and terrace. A variety of windows were custom made for the house by Kawneer Company of Niles, Michigan. Jacoby Art Glass Company of St. Louis, Missouri, created art glass insets for the Tudor arch windows, featuring scenes from Oklahoma history. The property also includes a carport and greenhouse. The property is currently owned by Enid businessman and attorney James Sears Bryant.

== H.H. Champlin ==
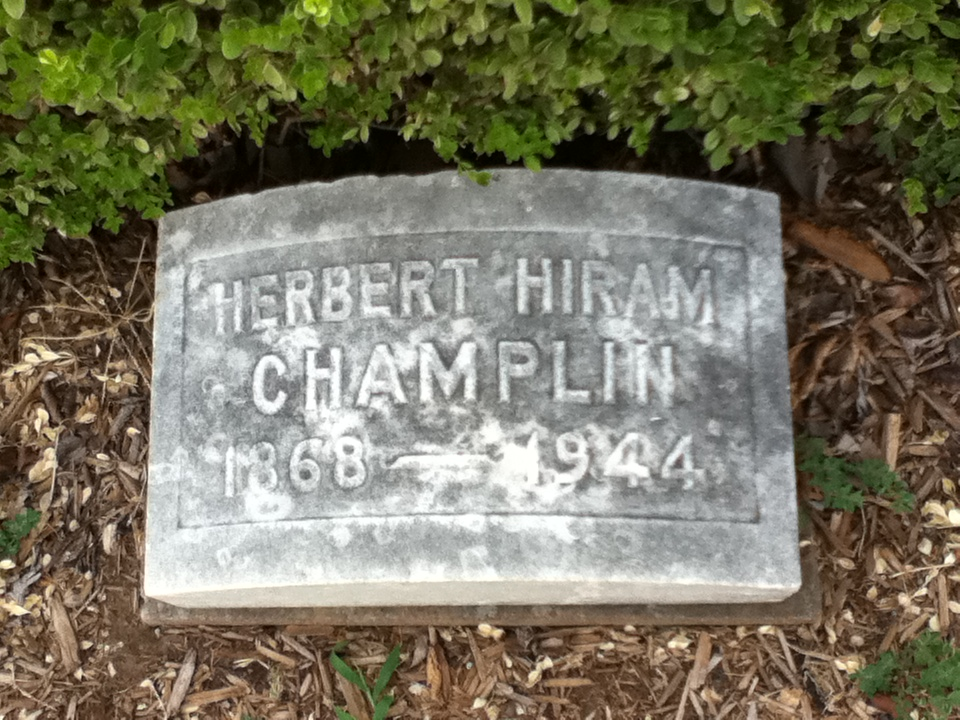
Grave of H.H. Champlin Sr in Enid Cemetery

Herbert Hiram Champlin was born to Charles Augustus Champlin and Alice Pickard on February 18, 1868, in Winnebago County, Illinois. He was the oldest of six sons, and one daughter who died at the age of three years. C.A. Champlin served in the Union Army in the Civil War, along with his two brothers Bradford and Joel, who died in the war. H.H. Champlin's family moved to McPherson County, Kansas, where his father soon died. H.H. Champlin graduated from McPherson High School, and then attended Friends University and Hill's Business College. Champlin married Ary Delight Noble on November 14, 1895. They had four children. Herbert H. Champlin died on April 30, 1944.

== First National Bank of Enid ==
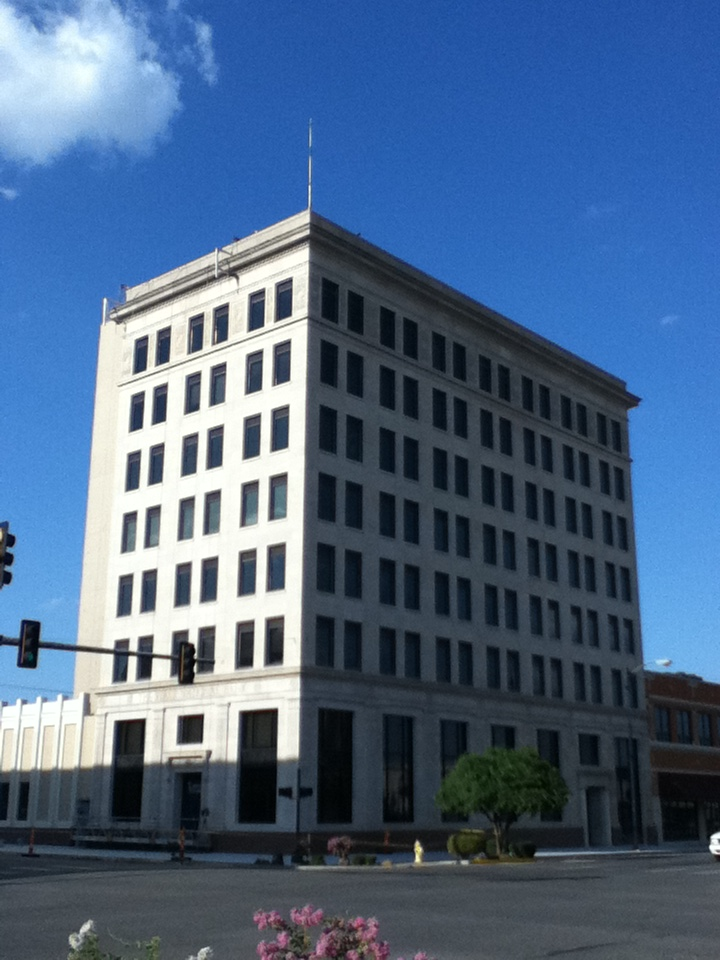
Enid's First National bank is the only bank in American history to have been closed by the military.

Champlin participated in the land run of 1893, investing in the Enid State Guaranty Bank. Champlin became ill and returned to Kansas. Upon recovery returned to operate a lumber yard with operations in Enid, Hobart, Kingfisher and Lawton. Charley and Sherman Goltry had taken control of the Bank during Champlin's absence, and Champlin repurchased the bank from them. During the wave of bank closings in March 1933, Governor William H. Murray ordered all banks in the State of Oklahoma to close. Champlin refused and continued to operate the bank which was financially sound. In response, the governor called out the National Guard. Captain Stephen J. England led eighteen militia men into town to close the bank, earning the First National Bank of Enid the distinction of the only bank ever to be closed by the military in American history. Although it survived the depression, the bank was among several banks in Enid that closed in the 1980s as a result of a bad economy.

== Champlin Oil Company ==
In 1916, oil was discovered at Garber Field. Champlin bought the mineral rights from George Beggs, a farmer who resided in the area. During Champlin's lifetime, the Champlin Oil Company expanded to operate service stations and wholesale outlets in twenty midwestern states and drilling and production operations in Oklahoma, Texas, Colorado, and New Mexico. By Mr. Champlin's death in 1944, the company employed over 800 people in Enid. Following nine years of continued family ownership, the company went public in 1953. The retail business was purchased by American Petrofina, and the refinery closed, in 1984.
