= R. E. Hoy No. 1 Oil Well =

- Hoy, R. E., No. 1 Oil Well
- U.S. National Register of Historic Places
- Location within Oklahoma Location within the United States
- Nearest city: Covington, Oklahoma
- Coordinates: 36°21′24″N 97°34′22″W
- Area: less than one acre
- Built: 1916
- Architect: Sinclair, Harry
- NRHP reference No.: 86002357
- Added to NRHP: September 26, 1986

The R.E. Hoy No. 1 Oil Well was constructed by the Sinclair Oil & Refining Corporation in September 1916. It has been listed on the National Register of Historic Places since 1986. Milton C. Garber and his brother Bert Garber hired geologist Dorsey Hager to determine potential drilling locations on their properties. The Garber brothers contracted Harry F. Sinclair to construct a well on R. E. Hoy's farm (NE corner, Section 25, T22N, R4W, Garfield County). The well was drilled at a depth of 1,130–56 feet. At 4:00 AM on September 10, the oil began to flow, starting out at 90 to 100 barrels per day (16 m^{3}/d). The Hoy sand was the first successful sand of the Garber-Covington oil field, and the first well to be drilled with the advice of a geologist. From 1916 to 1940 the well utilized primary production, adding secondary methods of gas injection (1941 to 1948) and waterflooding (since 1948). At the time of nomination, the Hoy well was producing 4 barrels per day (0.64 m^{3}/d), and had been in operation for 69 years.

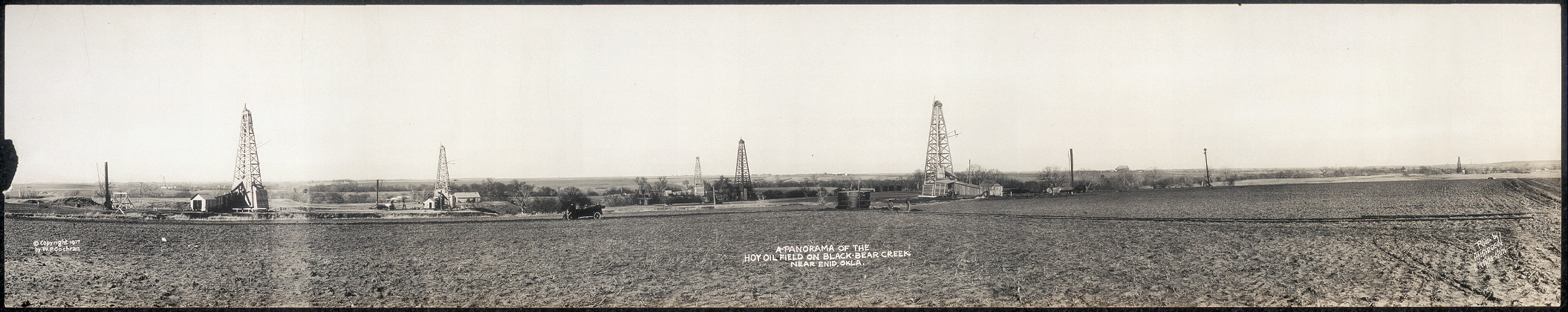
Panoramic view of the Hoy oil field in 1917.
